= 2011 Irish Classic =

Irish Classic
Tournament information
- Dates: 29–30 October 2011
- Venue: Celbridge Snooker Club
- City: Kildare
- Country: Ireland
- Organisation: RIBSA
- Format: Non-ranking event
- Highest break: (Republic of Ireland) Ken Doherty (120)

Final
- Champion: (Republic of Ireland) Fergal O'Brien
- Runner-up: (Republic of Ireland) Ken Doherty
- Score: 5–2

The 2011 Irish Classic was a professional non-ranking snooker tournament that took place between 29 and 30 October 2011 at the Celbridge Snooker Club in Kildare, Ireland. The event was sponsored by Lucan Racing.

Fergal O'Brien won in the final 5–2 against Ken Doherty, who made three century breaks (120, 107, 104) during the tournament.

== Main draw ==
Quarter-finals; Best of 7 frames		Semi-finals; Best of 9 frames		Final; Best of 9 frames
(Republic of Ireland) Fergal O'Brien	4
(Republic of Ireland) David Hogan	2	(Republic of Ireland) Fergal O'Brien	5
(Republic of Ireland) David Morris	4	(Republic of Ireland) David Morris	1
(Republic of Ireland) Joe Delaney	1			(Republic of Ireland) Fergal O'Brien	5
(Northern Ireland) Joe Swail	4			(Republic of Ireland) Ken Doherty	2
(Republic of Ireland) Rodney Goggins	1	(Northern Ireland) Joe Swail	1
(Republic of Ireland) Ken Doherty	4	(Republic of Ireland) Ken Doherty	5
(Northern Ireland) Patrick Wallace	1
