= 2008 Irish Classic =

Irish Classic
Tournament information
- Dates: 2–3 August 2008
- Venue: Celbridge Snooker Club
- City: Kildare
- Country: Ireland
- Organisation: RIBSA
- Format: Non-ranking event

Final
- Champion: (Republic of Ireland) Ken Doherty
- Runner-up: (Republic of Ireland) Fergal O'Brien
- Score: 5–2

The 2008 Irish Classic (often known as the 2008 Lucan Racing Irish Classic for sponsorship and promotion purposes) was a professional non-ranking snooker tournament that took place on 2 and 3 August 2008 at the Celbridge Snooker Club in Kildare, Ireland.

Ken Doherty won in the final 5–2 against Fergal O'Brien.

== Main draw ==
Quarter-finals; Best of 9 frames		Semi-finals; Best of 9 frames		Final; Best of 9 frames
(Northern Ireland) Joe Swail	5
(Republic of Ireland) David Morris	3	(Northern Ireland) Joe Swail	3
(Republic of Ireland) Fergal O'Brien	5	(Republic of Ireland) Fergal O'Brien	5
(Northern Ireland) Patrick Wallace	2			(Republic of Ireland) Fergal O'Brien	2
(Republic of Ireland) Joe Delaney	5			(Republic of Ireland) Ken Doherty	5
(Republic of Ireland) Rodney Goggins	4	(Republic of Ireland) Joe Delaney	3
(Republic of Ireland) Ken Doherty	5	(Republic of Ireland) Ken Doherty	5
(Republic of Ireland) Michael Judge	4
