= 2007 Irish Classic =

Irish Classic
Tournament information
- Dates: 18–19 August 2007
- Venue: Raphael's Snooker Club
- City: Dublin
- Country: Ireland
- Organisation: RIBSA
- Format: Non-ranking event
- Highest break: (England) Stuart Bingham (147)

Final
- Champion: (Republic of Ireland) David Morris
- Runner-up: (Republic of Ireland) Fergal O'Brien
- Score: 5–3

The 2007 Irish Classic (often known as the 2007 Lucan Racing Irish Classic for sponsorship and promotion purposes) was a professional non-ranking snooker tournament that took place between 18 and 19 August 2007 at the Raphael's Snooker Club in Dublin, Ireland.

David Morris won in the final 5–3 against Fergal O'Brien.

== Prize fund ==
The breakdown of prize money for this year is shown below:

- Winner: €1,000
- Runner-up: €500
- Semi-final: €300
- Quarter-final €150
- Highest break: €200

== Main draw ==
Quarter-finals; Best of 9 frames		Semi-finals; Best of 9 frames		Final; Best of 9 frames
(Northern Ireland) Joe Swail	2
(England) Stuart Bingham	4	(England) Stuart Bingham	3
(Republic of Ireland) Fergal O'Brien	4	(Republic of Ireland) Fergal O'Brien	5
(Republic of Ireland) Joe Delaney	0			(Republic of Ireland) Fergal O'Brien	3
(Republic of Ireland) Michael Judge	1			(Republic of Ireland) David Morris	5
(Northern Ireland) Patrick Wallace	4	(Northern Ireland) Patrick Wallace	3
(Republic of Ireland) David Morris	4	(Republic of Ireland) David Morris	5
(Republic of Ireland) Rodney Goggins	2

== Century breaks ==
- 147 – Stuart Bingham
- 100 – Fergal O'Brien
