= 2009 Irish Classic =

Irish Classic
Tournament information
- Dates: 24–26 July 2009
- Venue: Celbridge Snooker Club
- City: Kildare
- Country: Ireland
- Organisation: RIBSA
- Format: Non-ranking event
- Highest break: (Republic of Ireland) Fergal O'Brien (132)

Final
- Champion: (Northern Ireland) Joe Swail
- Runner-up: (Republic of Ireland) Fergal O'Brien
- Score: 5–0

The 2009 Irish Classic (often known as the 2009 Lucan Racing Irish Classic for sponsorship and promotion purposes) was a professional non-ranking snooker tournament that took place between 24 and 26 July 2009 at the Celbridge Snooker Club in Kildare, Ireland.

Joe Swail won in the final 5–0 against Fergal O'Brien.

== Round-robin stage ==
=== Group one ===
Table

POS	Player	MP	MW	FW	FL	FD	PTS
1	(Republic of Ireland) Fergal O'Brien	3	2	13	8	+5	2
2	(Northern Ireland) Joe Swail	3	2	13	8	+5	2
3	(Republic of Ireland) Ken Doherty	3	2	12	10	+2	2
4	(Republic of Ireland) David Morris	3	0	3	15	−12	0

Results:

- Fergal O'Brien 3–5 Ken Doherty
- Fergal O'Brien 5–0 David Morris
- Joe Swail 5–2 Ken Doherty
- David Morris 1–5 Joe Swail
- David Morris 2–5 Ken Doherty
- Fergal O'Brien 5–3 Joe Swail

=== Group two ===
Table Table

POS	Player	MP	MW	FW	FL	FD	PTS
1	(Republic of Ireland) Brendan O'Donoghue	3	3	15	8	+7	3
2	(Republic of Ireland) Michael Judge	3	2	14	11	+3	2
3	(Republic of Ireland) Joe Delaney	3	1	8	14	−6	1
4	(Northern Ireland) Patrick Wallace	3	0	11	15	−4	0

Results:

- Michael Judge 4–5 Brendan O'Donoghue
- Joe Delaney 3–5 Michael Judge
- Patrick Wallace 4–5 Brendan O'Donoghue
- Joe Delaney 0–5 Brendan O'Donoghue
- Michael Judge 5–3 Patrick Wallace
- Joe Delaney 5–4 Patrick Wallace

== Knock-out stage ==
Semi-finals; Best of 9 frames
(Republic of Ireland) Fergal O'Brien	5
(Republic of Ireland) Michael Judge	2
(Republic of Ireland) Brendan O'Donoghue	1
(Northern Ireland) Joe Swail	5

Final; Best of 9 frames
(Republic of Ireland) Fergal O'Brien	0
(Northern Ireland) Joe Swail	5

== Century breaks ==
- 132, 113 – Fergal O'Brien
- 118, 108, 104 – Joe Swail
- 115 – Brendan O'Donoghue
- 106 – Ken Doherty
