= Gerard Greene =

Northern Irish snooker player

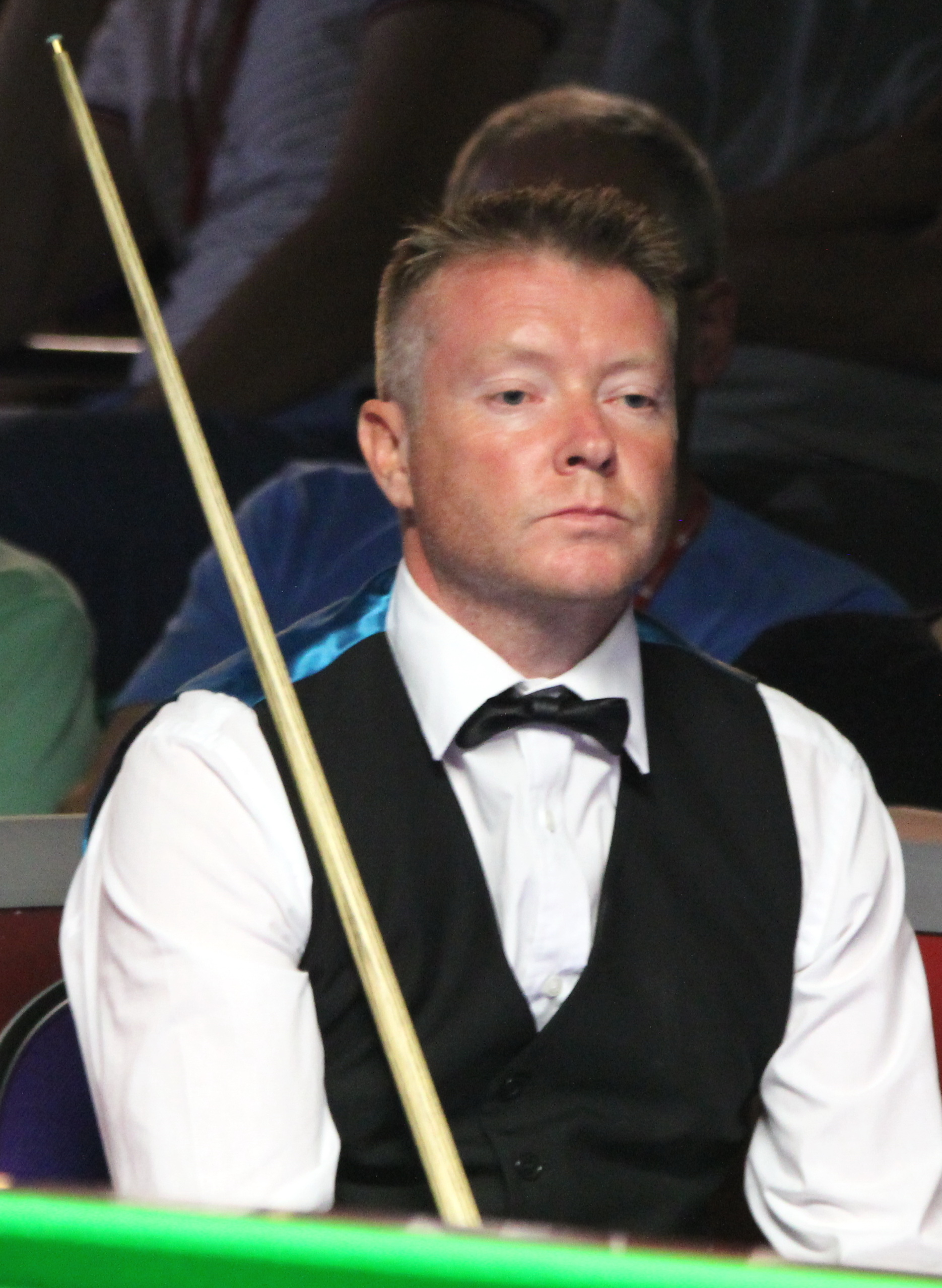
- Greene at the 2016 Paul Hunter Classic

Personal information
- Nickname: GG
- Born: 12 November 1973 (age 52) Chatham, Kent, England

Sport
- Country: Northern Ireland
- Sport: Snooker
- Professional: 1993–2016, 2017–2023
- Highest ranking: 26 (04/05)
- Century breaks: 121
- Best ranking finish: Runner-up (x1)
Medal record
Men's snooker
Representing Great Britain
World Games
Gold medal – first place	2005 Duisburg	Individual

Gerard Eamonn Greene (born 12 November 1973 in Chatham, Kent) is a Northern Irish former professional snooker player. He represents Northern Ireland in international events, as his parents are from Belfast.

Greene has enjoyed moderate success in his career, reaching his highest ranking, 26th, for the 2004–05 season, and has reached one ranking final, at the 2014 Players Championship Grand Final, where he lost 4–0 to Barry Hawkins. Alongside this, Greene reached a ranking semi-final, at the 2007 Grand Prix, losing to the eventual champion Marco Fu, and five quarter-finals.

Representing Northern Ireland with teammate Mark Allen, he reached the final of the 2011 World Cup, where they lost to China.

Greene has qualified for the World Championship five times without winning a match at the Crucible Theatre, although he twice drew the defending champion – John Higgins in 1999, and Peter Ebdon in 2003. He was ranked within the world's top 64 players from 1997 until he fell off the main tour, losing his professional status, in 2016. He rejoined the tour but fell off the main tour at the end of the 2023 World Championship.

== Career ==
=== Early career ===
Greene turned pro and joined the professional ranks in 1993/94 at the age of 20. In 1995/96 he got to the latter stages of three events and was up 38 places to 72nd in the World Rankings. In 1997 he got to his first ranking Quarter-final in the UK Championship by beating Ian Brumby 6–5 in the first round, Steve Davis 6–2 in the second round, Andy Hicks 9–6 in the third round, and Gary Ponting 9–6 in the last 16, taking him to the Quarter-finals where he lost 6–9 to Ronnie O'Sullivan.

=== 2003/2004 ===
He started the 2003/04 season in superb form reaching the British Open quarter final and the last 32 of the UK Championship beating Joe Swail 9–4 in the first round, then losing 9–7 to Matthew Stevens. He also reached the last 32 of the LG Cup. He was briefly provisionally in the top 16 but then suffered a mid season slump. Things picked up a little later in the campaign and he was assured of a place in the top 32 for the first time at number 26, and overtook Swail to become the number one player from Northern Ireland.

=== 2004/2005 ===
He then had some problems with his cue and his form suffered during the 2004/5 season when he failed in all but two of the ranking events, and despite reaching the Irish Masters quarter final he found himself back down to 38th in the rankings.

=== 2006/2007 ===
He returned to the top 32 after 2006/2007, the highlight being a run to the last 16 of the Northern Ireland Trophy.

=== 2007/2008 ===
He reached his first ranking semi-final at the 2007 Grand Prix. Greene came through Group B which included Ronnie O'Sullivan, Steve Davis, Dominic Dale and qualifiers Tom Ford and Mark Joyce. He beat Davis and Dale 4–0, Ford 4–3 and Joyce 4–2, his only defeat coming at the hands of Ronnie O'Sullivan, 4–2. He defeated qualifier Ricky Walden 5–0 in the last 16 with breaks of 101 and 91. In his quarter-final he faced Joe Perry, who he defeated 5–3 with breaks of 68, 57, 123 and rounding of the match with a 53. Eventual champion Marco Fu edged him out 6–5 in the semi-final. For a while before this tournament, he had no snooker club to practice in.

Showing his best form for years, he also reached the Quarter-final of the 2007 Northern Ireland Trophy, beating Liang Wenbo (5–2) in the first round. Then he beat former World Champions Mark Williams (5–3) and Ken Doherty (5–1) on the way. His run ended in the hands of Mark Allen, who he lost to 5–3. He lost form in 2008 however, failing to qualify for the World Championship after a 2–10 defeat to journeyman Mark Davis.

=== 2008/2009 ===
Greene's 2008/2009 season was solid but unspectacular. He won his opening match in six of the season's eight tournaments, but only went further in two of them. Crucially, he qualified for the World Championship by defeating Liu Song and Ken Doherty (gaining revenge for a defeat Doherty inflicted on him in the Northern Ireland Trophy). He was beaten 10–5 by Ali Carter in the first round.

=== 2009/2010 ===
Greene qualified for five of the six ranking events during the 2009–10 season, but once there lost in the wildcard round of the Shanghai Masters to Li Yan and in the first round of the other four. He finished the year ranked world number 28.

=== 2010/2011 ===
Greene began the 2010–11 season brightly by reaching the semi-finals of the second Players Tour Championship event. He defeated Anthony McGill in the last 16 and Ricky Walden in the quarter-finals, before losing 1–4 to Barry Pinches. He played in all 12 of these minor-ranking events and reached the last 16 on three occasions, which helped him finish 25th on the Order of Merit to qualify for the Finals, where he was defeated 2–4 by Matthew Stevens in the first round. He qualified for two other ranking events, the Welsh Open and China Open, but lost in the first round on both occasions to finish the season ranked world number 32.

=== 2011/2012 ===
Greene could not qualify for a single ranking event during the 2011–12 season. He also did not fare well in the Players Tour Championship events as he took part in all 12 of them but only advanced to the last 16 once to finish 57th on the PTC Order of Merit and 42nd in the world rankings.

=== 2012/2013 ===
Greene could not feature in the main draw of a ranking event until the Welsh Open in February. He beat David Grace and Ali Carter to qualify, but was then whitewashed 0–4 by Sam Baird in the first round. He had a very poor season in the PTC events to finish 89th on the Order of Merit. Green's slide down the world rankings during recent years continued as he finished 56th, a drop of 14 places from the start of the season.

=== 2013/2014 ===
Greene beat Martin O'Donnell 5–3 to qualify for the first ranking event of the 2013–14 season, the Wuxi Classic. At the venue he saw off Michael Wasley 5–1, before losing 5–2 to David Morris in the second round. Greene reached his first final after 20 years as a professional at the minor-ranking Paul Hunter Classic in August. He won four matches to reach the quarter-finals where he beat Joe Swail 4–1, then held his nerve against Ali Carter to win 4–3 after leading 3–0. In the final he faced Ronnie O'Sullivan and was defeated 4–0 in 44 minutes. He secured the highest break in the qualifying rounds of the International Championships, a break of 142 in a 6–5 defeat to Thepchaiya Un-Nooh. At the Ruhr Open Greene made the highest break of his professional career, a 144 in a 4–0 first round win over Germany's Phil Barnes. Greene went on to beat Nigel Bond 4–2 and then lost 4–2 to Anthony Hamilton in the last 32. His season seemed to be heading for an anti-climax as he could not win more than one match in any event until he played in the PTC Finals. His aforementioned final saw him finish 17th on the Order of Merit to qualify and he then defeated Ricky Walden 4–1 and came from 3–0 down against Anthony Hamilton to triumph 4–3. The wins kept on coming for Greene as he knocked out number one seed Mark Allen 4–2 and Marco Fu 4–2 to play in his first ranking event final. After his semi-final match with Fu, Greene stated that the week had made him feel like a professional snooker player for the first time in two years as he had been playing well against the top players. He played practice partner Barry Hawkins in the final and did not pot a ball in the first two frames and went on to be beaten 4–0, but the £38,000 runner-up's cheque is the biggest of his career to date. It also helped him climb 12 spots in the rankings to end the season as the world number 44.

=== 2014/2015 ===
Greene got off to a slow start in the 2014–15 season by failing to qualify for the first four ranking events. He won his first match in a ranking event at the UK Championship defeating Vinnie Calabrese 6–2. Greene made a break of 139 in his second round match against Matthew Stevens but lost 6–3. Greene won his first qualifying match for the German Masters but then lost in the final qualifying round to Li Hang. At the Welsh Open, Greene won his first match defeating Daniel Wells, but then suffered a whitewash at the hands of in form Liang Wenbo in the second round. Greene enjoyed his best run of the season in a ranking event at the Indian Open in reaching the Last 32. He defeated Ahmed Saif 4–0 in qualifying, and at the venue defeated Matthew Stevens 4–2, but was then edged out in the last 32 by Jamie Jones 4–3. Greene beat the in form Chris Wakelin 5–1 to qualify for the China Open, but was then beaten 5–2 by practice partner Barry Hawkins at the main venue. Greene participated in all 6 of the Players Tour Championship events, with his best performance a run to the last 32, defeating Neil Robertson along the way. He lost his first match only once in these events, but was only able to advance beyond the last 64 on one occasion, to finish 56th in the order of merit. At the World Championship, Greene beat Elliot Slessor 10–4 in the first qualifying round, but lost in the second qualifying round 10–6 to Mitchell Mann. Greene finished the season ranked in 40th place, from a position of 44 at the start of the season.

=== 2015/2016 ===
A 5–0 thrashing of David Morris saw Greene qualify for the Australian Goldfields Open, but he was the victim of a 5–0 defeat in the first round to Michael Holt. He was eliminated 6–5 in a scrappy match at the second round stage of the UK Championship against David Gilbert. Greene then lost seven of his last nine matches to finish the season as the world number 66, just outside of the top 64 who keep their places. He entered Q School, but only won two matches over the two events played to confirm his relegation from the tour.

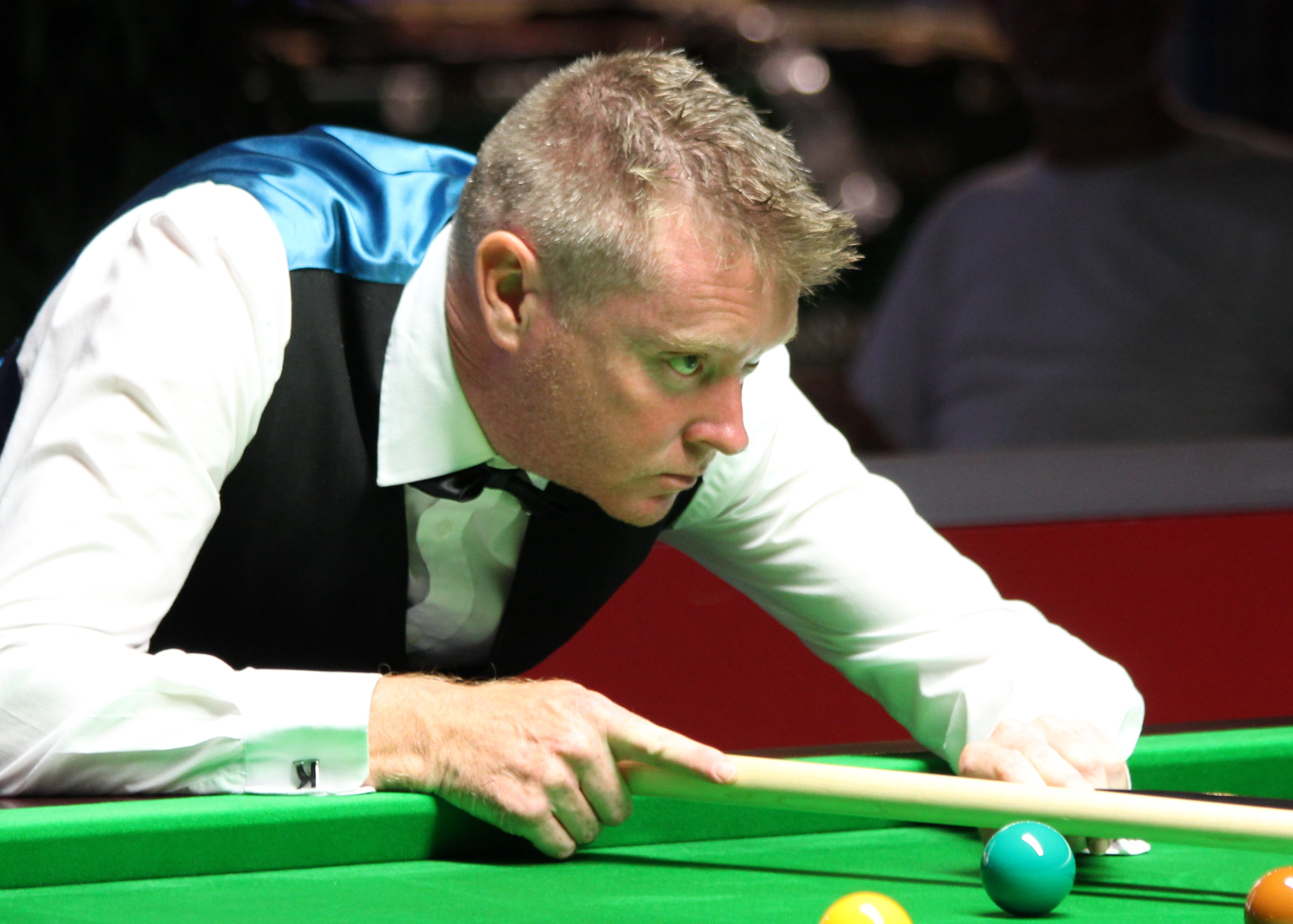
2016 Paul Hunter Classic

=== 2016/2017 ===
Greene qualified for the Paul Hunter Classic and beat Hatem Yassin 4–0, Stuart Bingham 4–3 and Michael Georgiou 4–1, before being thrashed 4–0 by Jamie Jones in the fourth round. He was defeated 4–3 by Stephen Maguire in the opening round of the Gibraltar Open and 10–6 by Fergal O'Brien in the first round of World Championship qualifying.

=== 2017/2018 ===
Greene played in the EBSA Play-off and saw off Ian Glover 4–2 and Steven Hallworth 4–1 to be awarded a two-year tour card.

== Performance and rankings timeline ==
Tournament	1993/ 94	1994/ 95	1995/ 96	1996/ 97	1997/ 98	1998/ 99	1999/ 00	2000/ 01	2001/ 02	2002/ 03	2003/ 04	2004/ 05	2005/ 06	2006/ 07	2007/ 08	2008/ 09	2009/ 10	2010/ 11	2011/ 12	2012/ 13	2013/ 14	2014/ 15	2015/ 16	2016/ 17	2017/ 18	2018/ 19	2019/ 20	2020/ 21	2021/ 22	2022/ 23	2024/ 25
Ranking	(Note: New players don't have a ranking)	169	110	72	62	59	41	58	63	63	38	26	37	38	32	33	32	28	32	42	56	44	40	(Note: He was an amateur)		68	(Note: Players qualified through Q School started the season without ranking points)	73	(Note: Players qualified One Year Ranking List started the season without ranking points)	79	
Ranking tournaments
Championship League	Tournament Not Held														Non-Ranking Event													RR	2R	RR	RR
Xi'an Grand Prix	Tournament Not Held																														
Saudi Arabia Masters	Tournament Not Held																														
English Open	Tournament Not Held																							A	2R	1R	1R	1R	1R	LQ	
British Open	LQ	LQ	LQ	2R	LQ	LQ	LQ	LQ	LQ	1R	QF	1R	Tournament Not Held																1R	1R	
Wuhan Open	Tournament Not Held																														
Northern Ireland Open	Tournament Not Held																							A	1R	2R	1R	1R	LQ	1R	
International Championship	Tournament Not Held																			LQ	LQ	LQ	LQ	A	LQ	LQ	LQ	Not Held			
UK Championship	LQ	LQ	1R	LQ	QF	1R	LQ	3R	LQ	1R	2R	1R	2R	2R	LQ	LQ	1R	LQ	LQ	LQ	1R	2R	2R	A	1R	1R	1R	2R	2R	LQ	
Shoot Out	Tournament Not Held																	Non-Ranking Event						A	4R	1R	1R	4R	1R	2R	2R
Scottish Open (Note: The event was called the International Open (1993/1994–1996/1997) and Players Championship (2003/2004))	LQ	LQ	LQ	LQ	2R	LQ	LQ	LQ	LQ	LQ	2R	Tournament Not Held								MR	Not Held			A	3R	2R	1R	1R	LQ	LQ	
German Masters (Note: The event was called the German Open (1995/1996–1997/1998))	Not Held		LQ	LQ	LQ	NR	Tournament Not Held											LQ	LQ	LQ	1R	LQ	LQ	A	LQ	LQ	1R	LQ	LQ	LQ	
Welsh Open	2R	LQ	2R	LQ	1R	2R	LQ	LQ	LQ	LQ	LQ	1R	LQ	2R	1R	LQ	LQ	1R	LQ	1R	2R	2R	1R	A	3R	1R	4R	2R	LQ	LQ	
World Open (Note: The event was called the Grand Prix (1993/1994–2000/2001 and 2004/2005–2009/2010) and the LG Cup (2001/2002–2003/2004))	2R	LQ	LQ	2R	1R	1R	1R	LQ	LQ	QF	2R	1R	3R	RR	SF	LQ	1R	LQ	LQ	LQ	1R	Not Held		A	LQ	LQ	LQ	Not Held			
World Grand Prix	Tournament Not Held																					NR	DNQ	DNQ	DNQ	DNQ	DNQ	DNQ	DNQ	DNQ	
Players Championship (Note: The event was called the Players Tour Championship Grand Final (2010/2011–2015/2016))	Tournament Not Held																	1R	DNQ	DNQ	F	DNQ	DNQ	DNQ	DNQ	DNQ	DNQ	DNQ	DNQ	DNQ	
Tour Championship	Tournament Not Held																									DNQ	DNQ	DNQ	DNQ	DNQ	
World Championship	LQ	LQ	LQ	LQ	LQ	1R	LQ	LQ	LQ	1R	LQ	1R	LQ	LQ	LQ	1R	1R	LQ	LQ	LQ	LQ	LQ	LQ	LQ	LQ	LQ	LQ	LQ	LQ	LQ	
Non-ranking tournaments
The Masters	LQ	LQ	LQ	LQ	LQ	LQ	LQ	LQ	LQ	LQ	LQ	A	LQ	LQ	LQ	LQ	LQ	A	A	A	A	A	A	A	A	A	A	A	A	A	
Championship League	Tournament Not Held														RR	A	A	A	A	A	A	A	A	A	A	A	RR	A	A	A	
World Seniors Championship	Tournament Not Held																	A	A	A	A	LQ	LQ	A	A	A	A	A	A	QF	
Former ranking tournaments
Asian Classic (Note: The event was called the Dubai Classic (1993/1994–1994/1995) and the Thailand Classic (1995/1996))	LQ	LQ	LQ	LQ	Tournament Not Held																										
Malta Grand Prix	NH	Non-Ranking Event					LQ	NR	Tournament Not Held																						
Thailand Masters (Note: The event was called the Thailand Open (1993/1994–1996/1997))	LQ	LQ	LQ	LQ	LQ	LQ	LQ	LQ	LQ	NR	Not Held			NR	Tournament Not Held																
Irish Masters	Non-Ranking Event									1R	LQ	QF	NH	NR	Tournament Not Held																
Northern Ireland Trophy	Tournament Not Held												NR	3R	QF	1R	Tournament Not Held														
Bahrain Championship	Tournament Not Held															LQ	Tournament Not Held														
Wuxi Classic (Note: The event was called the Jiangsu Classic (2008/2009–2009/2010))	Tournament Not Held															Non-Ranking Event				LQ	2R	LQ	Tournament Not Held								
Australian Goldfields Open (Note: The event was called the Australian Open (1994/1995–1995/1996) and the Australian Masters (1995/1996))	NH	Non-Ranking		Tournament Not Held															LQ	LQ	LQ	LQ	1R	Tournament Not Held							
Shanghai Masters	Tournament Not Held														LQ	LQ	1R	LQ	LQ	LQ	LQ	LQ	LQ	A	2R	Non-Ranking		Not Held			NR
Paul Hunter Classic (Note: The event was called the Grand Prix Fürth (2004/2005) and the Fürth German Open (2005/2006–2006/2007))	Tournament Not Held											Pro-am Event						Minor-Ranking Event						4R	1R	2R	NR	Tournament Not Held			
Indian Open	Tournament Not Held																				1R	2R	NH	A	2R	1R	Tournament Not Held				
China Open (Note: The event was called the China International (1997/1998–1998/1999))	Tournament Not Held				NR	LQ	LQ	LQ	LQ	Not Held		WR	LQ	LQ	LQ	1R	1R	1R	LQ	LQ	LQ	1R	1R	A	LQ	2R	Tournament Not Held				
Riga Masters (Note: The event was called the Riga Open (2014/2015–2015/2016))	Tournament Not Held																					Minor-Rank		A	1R	1R	1R	Tournament Not Held			
China Championship	Tournament Not Held																							NR	LQ	1R	LQ	Tournament Not Held			
WST Pro Series	Tournament Not Held																											RR	Not Held		
Turkish Masters	Tournament Not Held																												LQ	Not Held	
Gibraltar Open	Tournament Not Held																						MR	1R	1R	1R	1R	1R	1R	Not Held	
European Masters (Note: The event was called the European Open (1993/1994–1996/1997 and 2001/2002–2003/2004), the Irish Open (1998/1999) and the Malta Cup (2004/2005–2007/2008))	LQ	LQ	LQ	LQ	NH	1R	Not Held		LQ	2R	LQ	LQ	2R	LQ	NR	Tournament Not Held								A	2R	LQ	LQ	1R	LQ	LQ	NH
WST Classic	Tournament Not Held																													1R	NH
Former non-ranking tournaments
Poland Masters	Not Held		W	Tournament Not Held																											
Malta Grand Prix	NH	1R	A	A	A	A	R	A	Tournament Not Held																						
Irish Open	Tournament Not Held									SF	Tournament Not Held																				
Irish Masters	A	A	A	A	A	A	A	A	A	Ranking Event			NH	RR	Tournament Not Held																
Irish Professional Championship	Tournament Not Held												SF	QF	SF	Tournament Not Held															
Shoot Out	Tournament Not Held																	1R	3R	2R	1R	1R	1R	Ranking Event							
Six-red World Championship (Note: The event was called the Six-red Snooker International (2008/2009) and the Six-red World Grand Prix (2009/2010))	Tournament Not Held															A	A	A	NH	A	A	A	A	A	A	A	A	Not Held		LQ	NH

Performance Table Legend
LQ	lost in the qualifying draw	#R	lost in the early rounds of the tournament (WR = Wildcard round, RR = Round robin)	QF	lost in the quarter-finals
SF	lost in the semi-finals	F	lost in the final	W	won the tournament
DNQ	did not qualify for the tournament	A	did not participate in the tournament	WD	withdrew from the tournament

NH / Not Held	means an event was not held.
NR / Non-Ranking Event	means an event is/was no longer a ranking event.
R / Ranking Event	means an event is/was a ranking event.
MR / Minor-Ranking Event	means an event is/was a minor-ranking event.
PA / Pro-am Event	means an event is/was a pro-am event.

== Career finals ==
=== Ranking finals: 1 ===
Outcome	No.	Year	Championship	Opponent in the final	Score
Runner-up	1.	2014	Players Tour Championship Finals	(England) Barry Hawkins	0–4

=== Minor-ranking finals: 1 ===
Outcome	No.	Year	Championship	Opponent in the final	Score
Runner-up	1.	2013	Paul Hunter Classic	(England) Ronnie O'Sullivan	0–4

=== Non-ranking finals: 2 (2 titles) ===
Outcome	No.	Year	Championship	Opponent in the final	Score
Winner	1.	1996	Poland Masters	(Northern Ireland) Patrick Wallace	6–5
Winner	2.	2005	World Games	(China) Ding Junhui	4–3

=== Team finals: 1 ===
Outcome	No.	Year	Championship	Team/partner	Opponent(s) in the final	Score
Runner-up	1.	2011	World Cup	Northern Ireland	China	2–4

=== Seniors finals: 6 (4 titles) ===
Outcome	No.	Year	Championship	Opponent in the final	Score
Winner	1.	2025	Seniors Tour – Event 3	(England) Jamie Curtis-Barrett	4–2
Winner	2.	2025	Seniors Tour – Event 4	(England) Alfie Burden	4–3
Runner-up	1.	2025	Seniors Tour – Event 5	(England) Daniel Ward	2–4
Winner	3.	2026	Seniors Tour – Event 6	(England) Stuart Watson	4–0
Winner	4.	2026	Seniors Tour – Event 7	(England) Daniel Stott	4–1
Runner-up	2.	2026	Seniors Tour – Event 8	(Jersey) Aaron Canavan	2–4
