= 2005 Irish Professional Championship =

Irish Professional Championship
Tournament information
- Dates: 22–26 October 2005
- Venue: Spawell Sport & Leisure Complex
- City: Templeogue
- Country: Ireland
- Format: Non-Ranking event
- Total prize fund: €11,500
- Winner's share: €5,000
- Highest break: (Northern Ireland) Joe Swail (142)

Final
- Champion: (Northern Ireland) Joe Swail
- Runner-up: (Republic of Ireland) Ken Doherty
- Score: 9–7

The 2005 Irish Professional Championship was a professional invitational snooker tournament, which took place between 22 and 26 October 2005. The tournament was held at the Spawell Sport & Leisure Complex in Templeogue, and featured twenty-four exclusively Irish and Northern Irish players.

The qualifying round, last-16, quarter-final and semi-final matches were played over the best of nine frames, and the final over the best of seventeen. Joe Swail won the event, beating Ken Doherty 9–7 in the final.

== Results ==
=== Main draw ===
Last 16; Best of 9 frames
(Northern Ireland) Joe Swail	5
(Republic of Ireland) David Morris	0
(Republic of Ireland) Martin McCrudden	5
(Northern Ireland) Patrick Wallace	3
(Northern Ireland) Gerard Greene	5
(Republic of Ireland) Robert Murphy	2
(Republic of Ireland) Joe Delaney	5
(Republic of Ireland) Garry Hardiman	4
(Republic of Ireland) Ken Doherty	5
(Republic of Ireland) Colm Gilcreest	2
(Republic of Ireland) Leo Fernandez	5
(Northern Ireland) Colin Bingham	3
(Republic of Ireland) Fergal O'Brien	5
(Northern Ireland) Robert McCullough	0
(Republic of Ireland) Michael Judge	5
(Northern Ireland) Joe Meara	3

Quarter-finals; Best of 9 frames
(Northern Ireland) Joe Swail	5
(Republic of Ireland) Martin McCrudden	0
(Northern Ireland) Gerard Greene	5
(Republic of Ireland) Joe Delaney	3
(Republic of Ireland) Ken Doherty	5
(Republic of Ireland) Leo Fernandez	3
(Republic of Ireland) Fergal O'Brien	5
(Republic of Ireland) Michael Judge	2

Semi-finals; Best of 9 frames
(Northern Ireland) Joe Swail	5
(Northern Ireland) Gerard Greene	3
(Republic of Ireland) Ken Doherty	5
(Republic of Ireland) Fergal O'Brien	4

Final; Best of 17 frames
(Northern Ireland) Joe Swail	9
(Republic of Ireland) Ken Doherty	7

=== Qualifying ===
Last 24 (Best of 9 frames)

- (Republic of Ireland) David Morris 5–0 Mark Allen (Northern Ireland)
- (Republic of Ireland) Martin McCrudden 5–3 Tom Gleeson (Republic of Ireland)
- (Republic of Ireland) Robert Murphy 5–1 John Connors (Republic of Ireland)
- (Republic of Ireland) Garry Hardiman 5–2 Alex Higgins (Northern Ireland)
- (Republic of Ireland) Colm Gilcreest 5–4 Brendan O'Donoghue (Republic of Ireland)
- (Northern Ireland) Colin Bingham 5–3 Rodney Goggins (Republic of Ireland)
- (Northern Ireland) Robert McCullough 5–3 James Moore (Republic of Ireland)
- (Northern Ireland) Joe Meara 5–1 Nigel Power (Republic of Ireland)

== Century breaks ==
- 142, 129, 114, 102 – Joe Swail
- 124 – Ken Doherty
- 105 – Fergal O'Brien
