= 2002 Irish Masters =

Irish Masters
Tournament information
- Dates: 19–24 March 2002
- Venue: Citywest Hotel
- City: Saggart, Dublin
- Country: Ireland
- Organisation: WPBSA
- Format: Non-Ranking event
- Total prize fund: €251,000
- Winner's share: €100,000
- Highest break: John Higgins (SCO) (140)

Final
- Champion: John Higgins (SCO)
- Runner-up: Peter Ebdon (ENG)
- Score: 10–3

The 2002 Irish Masters (known as the 2002 Citywest Irish Masters for sponsorship reasons) was a professional invitational snooker tournament which was held at the Citywest Hotel in Saggart, Dublin, from 19 to 24 March. It was the 25th edition of the Irish Masters and the fourth and final World Professional Billiards and Snooker Association (WPBSA) invitational event of the 2001–02 season; it followed the third invitational event, the 2002 Masters, held in February. The tournament was co-sponsored by the Citywest hotel group and the Department of Health and Children and broadcast by RTÉ.

Third-ranked John Higgins won the competition, defeating the world number seven Peter Ebdon ten frames to three (10–3) in the final. It was Higgins' second Irish Masters victory, his fourth in a tournament that season and the 24th of his career. In the semi-finals Higgins defeated Matthew Stevens 6–5 and Ebdon won 6–3 over Ken Doherty. Higgins produced the tournament's highest break of 140 in the eighth frame of his semi-final match against Stevens to earn €5,000 and a further €100,000 for winning the event.

== Background ==
Founded in 1978 by the Benson & Hedges tobacco company as the Republic of Ireland's major snooker event, the Irish Masters originated as a snooker challenge match and became an elimination tournament. The 2002 competition was the 25th edition of the competition, and the fourth and final World Professional Billiards and Snooker Association (WPBSA) invitational event of the 2001–02 season. As an invitational event, it did not carry world ranking points. It featured a 12-player main draw held at the Citywest Hotel in Saggart, Dublin, from 19 to 24 March, and was co-sponsored by the hotel group Citywest and the Department of Health and Children. It had a prize fund of €251,000, and the host broadcaster was RTÉ.

A total of 12 players competed in the Irish Masters: the top eleven players in the world rankings, and a wild card entry, the world number sixteen, Fergal O'Brien. Each of the 12 players were seeded, with the first seed being Ronnie O'Sullivan, the 2001 Irish Masters winner, and the reigning UK and world champion. Steve Davis, the eight-time Irish Masters winner, missed the event for the first time since the 1986 tournament because he fell to 21st in the world rankings and was not given a wild card. The maximum number of frames played in a match increased from 11 in the first round, the quarter-finals and the semi-finals to the best-of-19 frames final on 24 March.

=== Prize money ===
The breakdown of prize money for the 2002 tournament is listed below.

- Winner: €100,000
- Runner-up: €38,000
- Semi-final (×2): €19,000
- Quarter-final (×4): €10,000
- First-round (×4): €7,500
- Highest break (×1): €5,000
- Total: €251,000

== Tournament summary ==
=== Round 1 ===
The first round of the tournament was held from 19 to 20 March as best-of-11 frame matches. World number eight Stephen Lee defeated the reigning Masters champion Paul Hunter 6–4 in their third meeting of the season. The match was equalled at 3–3 and then 4–4 before Lee compiled breaks of 72 and 88 to go through to the quarter-finals. Lee said he had worked to improve his technique and was pleased with it. World number seven Peter Ebdon won 6–2 against world championship semi-finalist Joe Swail. Ebdon compiled breaks of 120 and 81 to move clear of Swail and win the match—this after Swail had missed a red ball that would have allowed him to win the fifth frame. Both players agreed that Swail's error was the game's turning point.

Matthew Stevens won 6–5 over Jimmy White, who made his 20th successive appearance in the Irish Masters. Ahead 3–1, Stevens fell 4–3 behind White at the mid-session interval after he produced breaks of 106 and 102 and a clearance of 65 to the black ball. White missed a red to win the match while on a break of 62 and Stevens made a 58 clearance to the pink ball. Stevens missed the black and White potted it to force a final frame, which Stevens won 75–14. Stephen Hendry, the seven-time world champion, took a 6–2 victory over O'Brien. Leading 2–1 with a break of 74, O'Brien was tied when Hendry produced a 112 break. Hendry then made breaks of 98 and 100 en route to his win as O'Brien accumulated 41 points in that time.

=== Quarter-finals ===
The four best-of-11 frame quarter-finals took place from 21 to 22 March with the first-round winners playing one of the top four seeds. Ebdon was the first player through to the semi-finals when he defeated world number one Mark Williams 6–4. He took a 5–2 lead from breaks of 110, 77 and 113 along with a 93 clearance. Williams reduced the deficit to 5–4 before a miss on the black in the tenth frame allowed Ebdon to win the match. Ken Doherty played Lee in the second quarter-final. Lee achieved the match's top break of 90 as he drew the score at 2–2 and forced a re-spotted black after Doherty was out of position on the pink. Lee missed his target and Doherty took frame five before it went to 4–3 after Doherty incurred five fouls from being snookered on the green ball in the seventh. Lee took two of the following three frames to claim a 6–4 victory.

The third quarter-final was played between Hendry and John Higgins, the world number three. Breaks of 72, 131 and 96 gave Higgins a 3–1 lead before Hendry compiled a 64 run and a 137 total clearance to tie at 3–3. Higgins increased his lead to 5–3 with breaks of 54, 67 and 43 until Hendry made it 5–4 with a break of 65. He took a 6–4 win after tactical play in frame ten. Stevens defeated O'Sullivan 6–2 to claim the fourth semi-final spot. His victory saw him produce breaks of 68, 66 and 120 and accumulate 358 points without reply as O'Sullivan's best contributions were breaks of 103 and 88. At the post-match press conference, O'Sullivan gave monosyllabic answers to questions and stated the result was not the consequence of him fracturing his right hand in a game of association football the week before.

=== Semi-finals ===
Both semi-finals were held as best-of-11 frames on 23 March. Doherty and Ebdon played in the first match, which lasted more than four hours. The match was tied at 3–3, as Ebdon made breaks of 104, 84 and 62 and missed the final red ball in frame seven while trying to achieve a maximum break. After the mid-session interval, Doherty accumulated a total of 73 points as he was unable to respond to Ebdon who won 6–3. Ebdon commented afterwards that the match was untidy and he could not make high breaks. He said he was happy to reach the final because the Irish Masters was one of his favourite competitions since he had won it in 1995. Doherty said his technique was sub-par, and the match disappointed himself and the spectators: "It was hard to get into it and when you’re not playing well you lose control of the cue ball and make all sort of mistakes.”

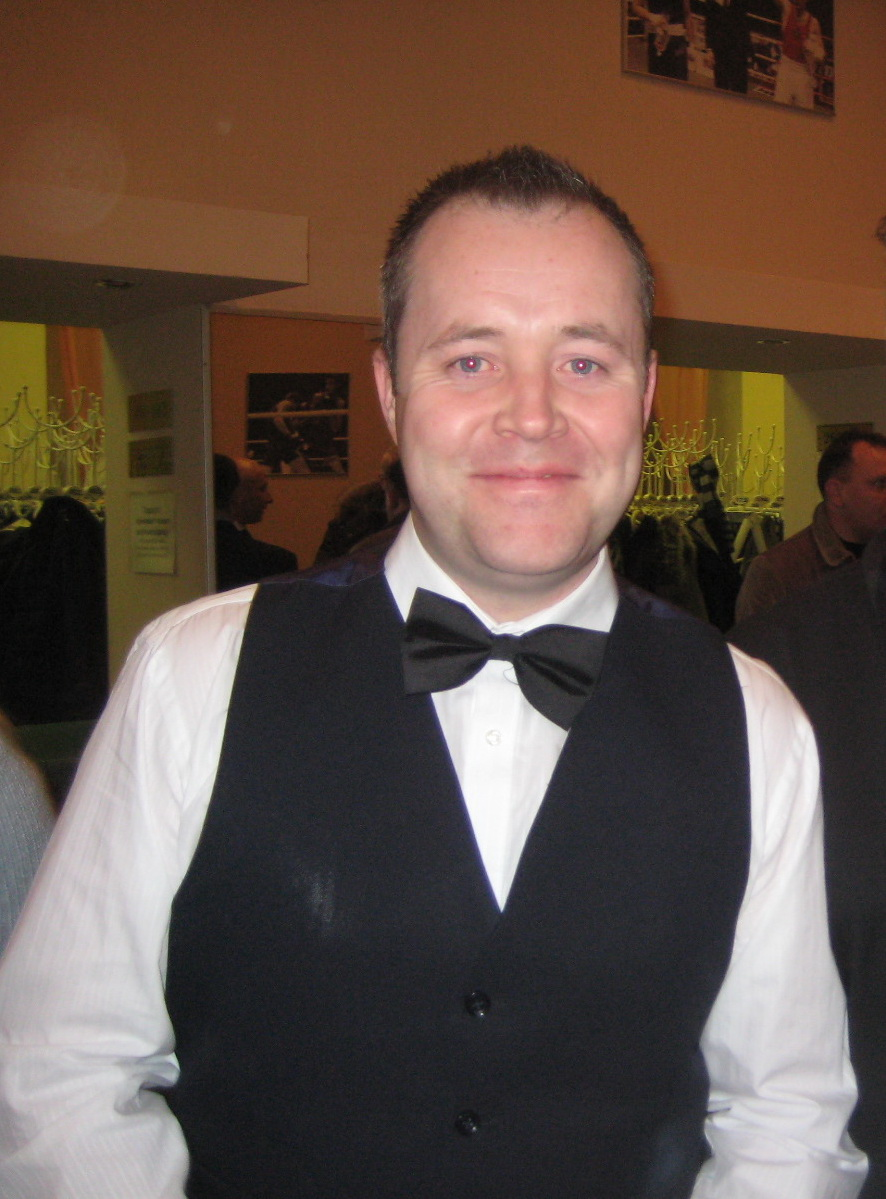
John Higgins (pictured in 2008), who won his second Irish Masters title

The other semi-final was contested by Higgins and Stevens. Stevens took a 3–0 lead before he had a cling on the brown ball and allowed Higgins to win five frames in succession including a total clearance of 140 in frame eight, the tournament's highest break. Stevens equalled the score at 5–5 to force a final frame; Higgins won it with a break of 42 for a 6–5 victory. Higgins said he was fortunate to have qualified for the final because he noted that Stevens would have led 4–0 had he not made an error early in the match: "It was very unlucky but it was up to me to take advantage and I managed to do that, despite letting it slip at 5–3."

=== Final ===
The final between Ebdon and Higgins on 24 March was contested over two sessions as a best-of-19 frames match. It marked Higgins' 38th professional tournament final; going into the match, Ebdon had won 8 of his 13 previous meetings against Higgins. The first session saw Higgins move into a 7–2 lead from breaks of 91, 109, 78 and two clearances of 55 and 62 to the brown ball. After the match resumed play, Higgins took the first frame of the evening session before Ebdon won frame 11 with a break of 64 to trail 3–8. Higgins then claimed the next two frames to win the game 10–3 and the tournament. It was the Higgins' second Irish Masters win; he won 9–4 against Hendry in the 2000 tournament. Higgins won his fourth title of the season after the Champions Cup, the Scottish Masters and the British Open, and the 24th of his career.

Higgins earned €100,000 for winning the competition and another €5,000 for making the highest break of 140 over Stevens in the semi-finals. He said he was delighted to win the tournament for a second time, and said the victory would make him confident for the 2002 World Championship because he had a poor form over the prior months: "Winning there isn't easy when you're not sure of your game but this is a real boost for me'." Ebdon said of his defeat: "John is one of the finest match-players the game has ever seen and I was never going to beat him playing like that. I've got a very good record against him but it counts for nothing if you don't play well enough. It's a shame I couldn't make more of a match of it but I've beaten some good players this week so I can take the positives." He added: "I was outclassed."

== Main draw ==
Players in bold denote match winners.

Round 1 Best of 11 frames
5	**Stephen Hendry** (SCO)	**6**
12	Fergal O'Brien (IRL)	2
6	**Matthew Stevens** (WAL)	**6**
11	Jimmy White (ENG)	5
7	**Peter Ebdon** (ENG)	**6**
10	Joe Swail (NIR)	2
8	**Stephen Lee** (ENG)	**6**
9	Paul Hunter (ENG)	4

Quarter-finals; Best of 11 frames
3	(Scotland) **John Higgins**	**6**
5	(Scotland) Stephen Hendry	4
6	(Wales) **Matthew Stevens**	**6**
1	(England) Ronnie O'Sullivan	2
7	(England) **Peter Ebdon**	**6**
2	(Wales) Mark Williams	4
4	(Republic of Ireland) **Ken Doherty**	**6**
8	(England) Stephen Lee	4

Semi-finals; Best of 11 frames
3	(Scotland) **John Higgins**	**6**
6	(Wales) Matthew Stevens	5
7	(England) **Peter Ebdon**	**6**
4	(Republic of Ireland) Ken Doherty	3

Final; Best of 19 frames
3	(Scotland) **John Higgins**	**10**
7	(England) Peter Ebdon	3

== Final ==
The bold text denotes each of the winning frame scores and the winning entrant. Breaks over 50 are shown in brackets.

Final: Best of 19 frames. Citywest Hotel, Dublin, Republic of Ireland, 24 March 2002.
**John Higgins**; Scotland	**10**–3	Peter Ebdon; England
Afternoon: **91** (**91**)–39, **61**–14, 46–**71**, **63**–2, **133**–4 (**109**), 56 (56)–**66** (**55**), **69** (**69**)–62 (62), **78** (**78**)–0, **61** (**55**)–30; Evening: **87**–18, 19–**94** (**64**), **79** (**79**)–0, **78**–39
**109**	Highest break	79
**1**	Century breaks	0
**7**	50+ breaks	3

== Century breaks ==
There were a total of 14 century breaks made by 6 different players during the tournament. The highest break of 140 was achieved by Higgins in the 8th frame of his semi-final match with Stevens.

- 140, 131, 109 – John Higgins
- 137, 112, 100 – Stephen Hendry
- 120, 113, 110, 104 – Peter Ebdon
- 120 – Matthew Stevens
- 106, 102 – Jimmy White
- 103 – Ronnie O'Sullivan
