= 1993 Irish Professional Championship =

Irish Professional Championship
Tournament information
- Dates: 16–20 May 1993
- Venue: Jury's Hotel
- City: Cork
- Country: Ireland
- Format: Non-ranking event
- Total prize fund: £16,500
- Winner's share: £5,000

Final
- Champion: (Republic of Ireland) Ken Doherty
- Runner-up: (Republic of Ireland) Stephen Murphy
- Score: 9–2

The 1993 Murphys Irish Professional Championship was a professional invitational snooker tournament, which took place between 16 and 20 May 1993 at Jury's Hotel in Cork, Ireland.

Ken Doherty won the title by beating Stephen Murphy 9–2 in the final.

== Main draw ==
Last 16; Best of 9 frames
(Republic of Ireland) Ken Doherty	5
(Northern Ireland) Dylan Leary	0
(Republic of Ireland) Eugene Hughes	5
(Republic of Ireland) Paddy Browne	4
(Northern Ireland) Jason Prince	5
(Republic of Ireland) Stephen O'Connor	1
(Northern Ireland) Alex Higgins	5
(Republic of Ireland) Jimmy Long	3
(Republic of Ireland) Stephen Murphy	5
(Republic of Ireland) Joe Delaney	2
(Northern Ireland) Joe Swail	5
(Republic of Ireland) Michael Judge	3
(Northern Ireland) Martin O'Neill	5
(Republic of Ireland) Fergal O'Brien	1
(Northern Ireland) Jack McLaughlin	5
(Northern Ireland) Dermot McGlinchey	1

Quarter-finals; Best of 9 frames
(Republic of Ireland) Ken Doherty	5
(Republic of Ireland) Eugene Hughes	0
(Northern Ireland) Jason Prince	5
(Northern Ireland) Alex Higgins	2
(Republic of Ireland) Stephen Murphy	5
(Northern Ireland) Joe Swail	4
(Northern Ireland) Martin O'Neill	5
(Northern Ireland) Jack McLaughlin	4

Semi-finals; Best of 11 frames
(Republic of Ireland) Ken Doherty	6
(Northern Ireland) Jason Prince	3
(Republic of Ireland) Stephen Murphy	6
(Northern Ireland) Martin O'Neill	1

Final; Best of 17 frames
(Republic of Ireland) Ken Doherty	9
(Republic of Ireland) Stephen Murphy	2
