= Leo Fernandez =

Irish snooker player (born 1976)

Personal information
- Born: 5 July 1976 (age 50) County Limerick, Ireland

Sport
- Country: Ireland
- Sport: Snooker
- Professional: 1995–1997, 1998–2001, 2002–2006, 2007/2008, 2016–2018
- Highest ranking: 67 (2004–05)
- Best ranking finish: Last 16 (x1)

Leo Fernandez (born 5 July 1976 in Limerick) is an Irish former professional snooker player.

== Snooker career ==
Fernandez's best ranking event progress was reaching the last 16 of the 2003 Welsh Open, defeating opponents including fellow Irishman Fergal O'Brien and Mark King. He qualified for the 1999 World Championship but drew Ronnie O'Sullivan and lost 10–3. He also reached the final qualifying round in 2004, losing 10–8 to Dominic Dale. He was Jamie Burnett's opponent in 2004 UK Championship qualifying when Burnett scored a 148 break, the first ever break in excess of 147 in a professional match.

As an amateur, Fernandez reached the final of English Amateur Championship in 2010, losing to Jack Lisowski, playing in the tournament again in 2011 and winning the title, victorious 10–6 in the final over John Whitty. He entered the 2015 Q School and made it to the final round of the first event before losing 4–1 to Rhys Clark. In October 2015, Fernandez played in the Asian Tour, and reached quarter-finals of the Haining Open before losing 4–1 to world number 11 Ricky Walden. This need being enough for Fernandez to qualify the main tour, however Fernandez was suspended from the sport of snooker for a period of 15 months following corruption charges and would not be eligible to participate in snooker events before 27 August 2017.

In November 2017, Fernandez beat the world number three player Ding Junhui in the UK Championship coming from 5-1 behind to defeat the two-time former UK Champion 6–5 at the York Barbican.

== Personal life ==
Fernandez was born in Limerick, Ireland, but lives in Kendal England.

== Match fixing ban ==
Fernandez was given a 15-month ban by the World Professional Billiards and Snooker Association (WPBSA) in July 2016 for admitting to a breach of their corruption rules.

After suspicious betting was placed on who would commit the first foul in the first frame, Fernandez admitted to playing that shot intentionally in order to aid those who had placed the bets in question. He was banned from 27 May 2016 to 27 August 2017, while he was fined €2,000 and made to assist the WPBSA in its anti-corruption education work.

== Performance and rankings timeline ==
Tournament	1995/ 96	1996/ 97	1997/ 98	1998/ 99	1999/ 00	2000/ 01	2001/ 02	2002/ 03	2003/ 04	2004/ 05	2005/ 06	2007/ 08	2010/ 11	2011/ 12	2013/ 14	2015/ 16	2016/ 17	2017/ 18	2018/ 19	2019/ 20	2020/ 21	2021/ 22
Ranking (Note: From the 2010/2011 season it shows the ranking at the beginning of the season)	(Note: New players on the Main Tour don't have a ranking)	214	(Note: He was not on the Main Tour)	155	81	71			72	67	74		(Note: He was an amateur)					(Note: He was suspended from the start of the previous season for 15 months and began this season without ranking points)				
Ranking tournaments
Championship League	Tournament Not Held											Non-Ranking Event									RR	RR
British Open	LQ	LQ	A	LQ	2R	LQ	A	LQ	WD	LQ	Tournament Not Held											A
Northern Ireland Open	Tournament Not Held																A	1R	A	A	A	A
English Open	Tournament Not Held																A	1R	A	A	A	A
UK Championship	LQ	LQ	A	LQ	LQ	LQ	A	1R	LQ	LQ	LQ	LQ	A	A	A	1R	A	2R	A	A	1R	A
Scottish Open (Note: The event was called the International Open (1995/1996–1996/1997) and the Players Championship (2003/2004))	LQ	LQ	A	2R	LQ	LQ	A	LQ	LQ	Tournament Not Held							A	1R	A	A	A	A
World Grand Prix	Tournament Not Held															DNQ	DNQ	DNQ	DNQ	DNQ	DNQ	DNQ
Shoot-Out	Tournament Not Held												Non-Ranking Event				A	1R	A	A	2R	2R
German Masters (Note: The event was called the German Open (1995/1996–1997/1998))	LQ	LQ	A	NR	Tournament Not Held								A	A	A	A	A	LQ	A	A	LQ	A
Players Championship (Note: The event was called the Players Tour Championship Grand Finals (2010/2011–2012/2013) and the Players Championship Grand Final (2013/2014–2015/2016))	Tournament Not Held												DNQ	DNQ	DNQ	DNQ	DNQ	DNQ	DNQ	DNQ	DNQ	DNQ
European Masters (Note: The event was called the European Open (1995/1996-1996/1997 & 2001/2002-2003/2004), Irish Open (1998/1999) Malta Cup (2004/2005–2007/2008))	1R	LQ	NH	LQ	Not Held		A	LQ	LQ	LQ	LQ	NR	Tournament Not Held				A	A	A	A	A	A
Welsh Open	LQ	LQ	A	LQ	LQ	LQ	A	2R	LQ	LQ	LQ	LQ	A	A	A	2R	A	1R	A	A	A	A
Turkish Masters	Tournament Not Held																					A
Gibraltar Open	Tournament Not Held															MR	A	1R	1R	LQ	2R	1R
Tour Championship	Tournament Not Held																		DNQ	DNQ	DNQ	DNQ
World Championship	LQ	LQ	LQ	1R	LQ	LQ	LQ	LQ	LQ	LQ	LQ	LQ	A	A	A	LQ	A	LQ	A	A	LQ	A
Non-ranking tournaments
The Masters	LQ	LQ	LQ	LQ	LQ	LQ	A	LQ	LQ	A	LQ	LQ	A	A	A	A	A	A	A	A	A	A
Former ranking tournaments
Asian Classic (Note: The event was called the Thailand Classic (1995/1996))	LQ	LQ	Tournament Not Held																			
Malta Grand Prix	Non-Ranking Event				LQ	NR	Tournament Not Held															
Thailand Masters (Note: The event was called the Thailand Open (1995/1996–1996/1997))	LQ	LQ	A	LQ	LQ	LQ	A	NR	Tournament Not Held			NR	Tournament Not Held									
Irish Masters	Non-Ranking Event							LQ	LQ	LQ	NH	Tournament Not Held										
Northern Ireland Trophy	Tournament Not Held										NR	LQ	Tournament Not Held									
Australian Goldfields Open (Note: The event was called the Australian Masters (1995/1996))	NR	Tournament Not Held												A	A	LQ	Tournament Not Held					
Shanghai Masters	Tournament Not Held											LQ	A	A	A	LQ	A	LQ	Non-Ranking		Not Held	
Paul Hunter Classic (Note: The event was called the Grand Prix Fürth (2004/2005) and the Fürth German Open (2005/2006–2006/2007))	Tournament Not Held									Pro-am Event			Minor-Ranking Event				A	A	A	NR	Not Held	
Indian Open	Tournament Not Held														A	NH	WD	A	LQ	Tournament Not Held		
China Open (Note: The event was called the China International (1997/1998–1998/1999))	Not Held		NR	LQ	LQ	LQ	A	Not Held		LQ	LQ	LQ	A	A	A	LQ	A	LQ	A	Tournament Not Held		
Riga Masters (Note: The event was called the Riga Open (2014/2015–2015/2016))	Tournament Not Held															MR	WD	A	A	A	Not Held	
International Championship	Tournament Not Held														A	LQ	A	LQ	A	A	Not Held	
China Championship	Tournament Not Held																NR	A	A	A	Not Held	
World Open (Note: The event was called the Grand Prix (1995/1996–2000/2001 and 2004/2005–2009/2010), the LG Cup (2001/2002–2003/2004) and the Haikou World Open (2011/2012–2013/2014))	LQ	LQ	A	LQ	1R	LQ	A	LQ	LQ	2R	LQ	LQ	A	A	A	NH	WD	A	A	A	Not Held	
WST Pro Series	Tournament Not Held																				RR	NH
Former Non-ranking tournaments
Irish Professional Championship	Tournament Not Held										QF	1R	Tournament Not Held									

Performance Table Legend
LQ	lost in the qualifying draw	#R	lost in the early rounds of the tournament (WR = Wildcard round, RR = Round robin)	QF	lost in the quarter-finals
SF	lost in the semi-finals	F	lost in the final	W	won the tournament
DNQ	did not qualify for the tournament	A	did not participate in the tournament	WD	withdrew from the tournament

NH / Not Held	means an event was not held
NR / Non-Ranking Event	means an event is/was no longer a ranking event
R / Ranking Event	means an event is/was a ranking event
MR / Minor-Ranking Event	means an event is/was a minor-ranking event
PA / Pro-am Event	means an event is/was a pro-am event

== Career finals ==
=== Non-ranking finals: 2 (1 title) ===
Outcome	No.	Year	Championship	Opponent in the final	Score
Runner-up	1.	2001	WPBSA Open Tour – Event 2	(England) Brian Morgan	2–5
Winner	1.	2001	Challenge Tour – Event 2	(Wales) Ryan Day	6–3

=== Pro-am finals: 4 (3 titles) ===
Outcome	No.	Year	Championship	Opponent in the final	Score
Winner	1.	2007	Pontins Spring Open	(Wales) Daniel Wells	5–2
Winner	2.	2007	Pontins Pro-Am - Event 2	(Wales) Dominic Dale	4–2
Runner-up	1.	2008	Pontins Autumn Open	(England) Craig Steadman	0–5
Winner	3.	2011	Pontins Spring Open (2)	(England) Sydney Wilson	5–1

=== Amateur finals: 5 (3 titles) ===
Outcome	No.	Year	Championship	Opponent in the final	Score
Winner	1.	2003	English Open	(England) Craig Butler	8–7
Winner	2.	2006	PIOS – Event 3	(Wales) Lee Walker	6–5
Runner-up	1.	2010	English Amateur Championship	(England) Jack Lisowski	2–9
Winner	3.	2011	English Amateur Championship	(England) John Whitty	10–6
Runner-up	2.	2023	English Amateur Championship (2)	(England) Paul Deaville	2–6

=== Seniors finals: 1 (1 title) ===
Outcome	No.	Year	Championship	Opponent in the final	Score
Winner	1.	2019	World Seniors Tour Finals	(England) James O'Sullivan	4–2
