= 2010 Irish Classic =

Irish Classic
Tournament information
- Dates: 24–25 July 2010
- Venue: Celbridge Snooker Club
- City: Kildare
- Country: Ireland
- Organisation: RIBSA
- Format: Non-ranking event

Final
- Champion: (Republic of Ireland) Fergal O'Brien
- Runner-up: (Republic of Ireland) Michael Judge
- Score: 5–1

The 2010 Irish Classic (often known as the 2010 Lucan Racing Irish Classic for sponsorship and promotion purposes) was a professional non-ranking snooker tournament that took place between 24 and 25 July 2010 at the Celbridge Snooker Club in Kildare, Ireland.

Fergal O'Brien won in the final 5–1 against Michael Judge.

== Main draw ==
Quarter-finals; Best of 9 frames		Semi-finals; Best of 9 frames		Final; Best of 9 frames
(Republic of Ireland) Fergal O'Brien	5
(Republic of Ireland) Rodney Goggins	3	(Republic of Ireland) Fergal O'Brien	5
(Republic of Ireland) Joe Delaney	5	(Republic of Ireland) Joe Delaney	3
(Republic of Ireland) Robert Murphy	1			(Republic of Ireland) Fergal O'Brien	5
(Republic of Ireland) Michael Judge	5			(Republic of Ireland) Michael Judge	1
(Republic of Ireland) Martin McCrudden	4	(Republic of Ireland) Michael Judge	5
(Republic of Ireland) Colm Gilcreest	5	(Republic of Ireland) Colm Gilcreest	3
(Republic of Ireland) David Morris	4
