= 2007 Irish Professional Championship =

Irish Professional Championship
Tournament information
- Dates: 25–30 September 2007
- Venue: Red Cow Exhibition Centre
- City: Dublin
- Country: Ireland
- Format: Non-Ranking event
- Total prize fund: €16,500
- Winner's share: €8,000
- Highest break: 115 (Ken Doherty)

Final
- Champion: (Republic of Ireland) Ken Doherty
- Runner-up: (Republic of Ireland) Fergal O'Brien
- Score: 9–2

The 2007 Irish Professional Championship was a professional invitational snooker tournament which took place in September 2007. The tournament was held at the Red Cow Exhibition Centre in Dublin, and featured sixteen players exclusively from the Republic of Ireland and Northern Ireland.

The last-16 and quarter-final matches were played over the best of nine frames, the semi-finals best of eleven and the final best of seventeen.

Two-time world champion and six-time Irish Professional champion Alex Higgins, now aged 58, entered the tournament for the third year in succession; his first-round loss to Fergal O'Brien would be the final competitive match he played before his death in 2010.

Ken Doherty won the event, beating O'Brien 9–2 in the final.

== Main draw ==
Last 16; Best of 9 frames
(Republic of Ireland) Fergal O'Brien	5
(Northern Ireland) Alex Higgins	0
(Northern Ireland) Mark Allen	5
(Republic of Ireland) Gary Hardiman	4
(Republic of Ireland) Joe Delaney	5
(Republic of Ireland) Eamonn Kelly	1
(Northern Ireland) Joe Swail	5
(Republic of Ireland) Colm Gilcreest	1
(Northern Ireland) Gerard Greene	5
(Republic of Ireland) Leo Fernandez	3
(Republic of Ireland) Michael Judge	5
(Republic of Ireland) Dessie Sheehan	1
(Republic of Ireland) Vincent Muldoon	5
(Republic of Ireland) David Morris	2
(Republic of Ireland) Ken Doherty	5
(Northern Ireland) Patrick Wallace	0

Quarter-finals; Best of 9 frames
(Republic of Ireland) Fergal O'Brien	5
(Northern Ireland) Mark Allen	4
(Republic of Ireland) Joe Delaney	5
(Northern Ireland) Joe Swail	0
(Northern Ireland) Gerard Greene	5
(Republic of Ireland) Michael Judge	2
(Republic of Ireland) Vincent Muldoon	0
(Republic of Ireland) Ken Doherty	5

Semi-finals; Best of 11 frames
(Republic of Ireland) Fergal O'Brien	6
(Republic of Ireland) Joe Delaney	5
(Northern Ireland) Gerard Greene	2
(Republic of Ireland) Ken Doherty	6

Final; Best of 17 frames
(Republic of Ireland) Fergal O'Brien	2
(Republic of Ireland) Ken Doherty	9

== Final ==
Final: Best of 17 frames. Red Cow Exhibition Centre, Dublin, Republic of Ireland, 30 September 2007.
Ken Doherty (Republic of Ireland)	9–2	Fergal O'Brien (Republic of Ireland)
69(66)–0, 16–106(61), 76–47, 71–41, 66–76, 70(50)–1, 75–31, 73–1 (no score for three frames)
111	Highest break	61
1	Century breaks	0
3	50+ breaks	1

== Century breaks ==
- 115, 111 – Ken Doherty
- 107 – Joe Delaney
- 106 – David Morris
