= Irish Classic =

Tournament information
- Venue: Celbridge Snooker Club
- Location: Kildare
- Country: Ireland
- Established: 2007
- Organisation(s): RIBSA
- Format: Non-ranking event
- Final year: 2011
- Final champion: (Republic of Ireland) Fergal O'Brien

The Irish Classic was an invitational professional snooker tournament for players from the Republic of Ireland and Northern Ireland.

== History ==
The event was first held in the 2007/2008 season in Dublin, Republic of Ireland, and was organised by Fergal O'Brien. The event was last held at the Celbridge Snooker Club, Kildare, Republic of Ireland in 2011.

== Winners ==
Year	Winner	Runner-up	Final score	Season
2007	(Republic of Ireland) David Morris	(Republic of Ireland) Fergal O'Brien	5–3	2007/08
2008	(Republic of Ireland) Ken Doherty	(Republic of Ireland) Fergal O'Brien	5–2	2008/09
2009	(Northern Ireland) Joe Swail	(Republic of Ireland) Fergal O'Brien	5–0	2009/10
2010	(Republic of Ireland) Fergal O'Brien	(Republic of Ireland) Michael Judge	5–1	2010/11
2011	(Republic of Ireland) Fergal O'Brien	(Republic of Ireland) Ken Doherty	5–2	2011/12
