= 2003 Irish Open =

Tournament information
- Dates: 20–22 February 2003
- Venue: Millennium Forum
- City: Derry
- Country: Northern Ireland
- Organisation: NIBSA
- Format: Non-ranking event
- Winner's share: £5,000

Final
- Champion: Joe Swail (NIR)
- Runner-up: Fergal O'Brien (IRL)
- Score: 10–3

The 2003 Irish Open was an invitational non-ranking snooker tournament held in Derry, Northern Ireland in February 2003. The tournament was open to players from Northern Ireland and the Republic of Ireland. Joe Swail won the event, defeating Fergal O'Brien 10–3 in the final, earning £5,000 in prize money.

== Main draw ==
First round Best of 9 frames
Joe Swail (NIR)	5
Robert Murphy (IRL)	1
Darren Dornan (NIR)	5
Alex Higgins (NIR)	1
Gerard Greene (NIR)	5
Sean Dorrian (NIR)	0
Patrick Wallace (NIR)	5
Declan Hughes (NIR)	2
Fergal O'Brien (IRL)	5
Simon Cooke (NIR)	0
Colm Gilcreest (IRL)	5
John Sutton (IRL)	3
Jason Prince (NIR)	5
Paul King (NIR)	3
Michael Judge (IRL)	5
Gary Hardiman (IRL)	4

Quarter-finals; Best of 11 frames
Joe Swail (NIR)	6
Darren Dornan (NIR)	1
Gerard Greene (NIR)	6
Patrick Wallace (NIR)	4
Fergal O'Brien (IRL)	6
Colm Gilcreest (IRL)	0
Jason Prince (NIR)	6
Michael Judge (IRL)	3

Semi-finals; Best of 11 frames
Joe Swail (NIR)	6
Gerard Greene (NIR)	4
Fergal O'Brien (IRL)	6
Jason Prince (NIR)	2

Final; Best of 19 frames
Joe Swail (NIR)	10
Fergal O'Brien (IRL)	3
