= Michael Judge =

Irish snooker player (born 1975)

Personal information
- Born: 12 June 1975 (age 51) Dublin, Ireland

Sport
- Country: Ireland
- Sport: Snooker
- Professional: 1992–2011, 2021–2023
- Highest ranking: 24 (2002/03)
- Best ranking finish: Semi-final (x1)

Michael Judge (born 12 June 1975) is a former professional snooker player from Ireland. His best performance in a ranking event came in the 2004 Grand Prix, in which he reached the semi-finals. He reached his highest ranking, 24th, for the 2002–03 season.

== Career ==
Judge qualified for the World Championship three times; his best performance came in the 2001 tournament, in which he knocked Jimmy White out in qualifying and John Parrott in the first round, before being knocked out by fellow Dubliner Ken Doherty. A year later, he lost to eventual champion Peter Ebdon in the first round.

In 2006–07 he had something of a return to form, climbing 10 places in the rankings to 34th, after five successive falls from his career high of 24th, aided by a last 16 run in the Welsh Open. He then reached the last 16 of the Grand Prix early in the 2007–08 season, and repeated this at the Welsh Open in Newport, by beating Nigel Bond and Graeme Dott, both 5–4, before succumbing to a 5–2 defeat by Stephen Lee. He did enough in the rest of the season to return to the top 32 of the rankings. However, he slipped straight back out the following season after two last sixteen runs were tempered by six first round defeats. In January 2010 he qualified for the Welsh Open, losing to John Higgins in the first round proper. He quit after the following season, but returned to the sport a year later and went on to win the Irish Amateur Championship in 2013, beating Robert Redmond 8–5 in the final. He won it again in 2018 and entered the 2018 Q School in a bid to win back his place on the professional snooker tour. He reached the fifth round in events 2 and 3 but failed to regain a place on the main tour.

== Performance and rankings timeline ==
Tournament	1992/ 93	1993/ 94	1994/ 95	1995/ 96	1996/ 97	1997/ 98	1998/ 99	1999/ 00	2000/ 01	2001/ 02	2002/ 03	2003/ 04	2004/ 05	2005/ 06	2006/ 07	2007/ 08	2008/ 09	2009/ 10	2010/ 11	2011/ 12	2018/ 19	2021/ 22	2022/ 23
Ranking (Note: From the 2010/2011 season it shows the ranking at the beginning of the season.)	(Note: New players on the Main Tour don't have a ranking)	262	171	100	71	56	58	67	46	28	24	37	42	43	43	34	30	36	52	(Note: He was an amateur)		(Note: Players qualified through Q School started the season without ranking points)	87
Ranking tournaments
Championship League	Tournament Not Held															Non-Ranking Event						RR	2R
European Masters (Note: The event was called the European Open (1992/1993–1996/1997 and 2001/2002–2003/2004), the Irish Open (1998/1999) and the Malta Cup (2004/2005–2007/2008))	LQ	LQ	LQ	LQ	LQ	NH	LQ	Not Held		2R	LQ	LQ	LQ	LQ	1R	NR	Tournament Not Held				A	LQ	1R
British Open	LQ	LQ	1R	LQ	QF	1R	2R	1R	LQ	1R	2R	2R	LQ	Tournament Not Held								1R	LQ
Northern Ireland Open	Tournament Not Held																				A	LQ	LQ
UK Championship	LQ	LQ	1R	LQ	LQ	LQ	LQ	2R	3R	2R	1R	LQ	LQ	1R	1R	LQ	LQ	LQ	LQ	A	A	1R	LQ
Scottish Open (Note: The event was called the International Open (1992/1993–1996/1997) and the Players Championship (2003/2004))	LQ	LQ	LQ	2R	1R	1R	LQ	LQ	1R	3R	1R	LQ	Tournament Not Held								A	1R	LQ
English Open	Tournament Not Held																				1R	LQ	LQ
World Grand Prix	Tournament Not Held																				DNQ	DNQ	DNQ
Shoot Out	Tournament Not Held																		Non-Rank		1R	1R	1R
German Masters (Note: The event was called the German Open (1995/1996–1997/1998))	Not Held			LQ	LQ	LQ	NR	Tournament Not Held											WD	A	A	LQ	LQ
Welsh Open	LQ	LQ	LQ	LQ	LQ	2R	1R	LQ	LQ	LQ	LQ	2R	LQ	LQ	3R	3R	2R	1R	LQ	A	A	LQ	LQ
Players Championship (Note: The event was called the Players Tour Championship Grand Final (2010/2011–2011/2012))	Tournament Not Held																		DNQ	DNQ	DNQ	DNQ	DNQ
WST Classic	Tournament Not Held																						1R
Tour Championship	Tournament Not Held																				DNQ	DNQ	DNQ
World Championship	LQ	LQ	LQ	LQ	LQ	LQ	LQ	LQ	2R	1R	LQ	LQ	LQ	LQ	LQ	1R	LQ	LQ	LQ	A	LQ	LQ	LQ
Non-ranking tournaments
The Masters	LQ	LQ	LQ	LQ	LQ	LQ	LQ	LQ	LQ	LQ	LQ	LQ	A	LQ	LQ	LQ	A	A	A	A	A	A	A
Six-red World Championship (Note: The event was called the Six-red Snooker International (2008/2009) and the Six-red World Grand Prix (2009/2010))	Tournament Not Held																A	A	A	NH	A	NH	LQ
Former ranking tournaments
Dubai Classic (Note: The event was called the Thailand Classic (1995/1996) and the Asian Classic (1996/1997))	LQ	LQ	LQ	LQ	LQ	Tournament Not Held																	
Malta Grand Prix	Not Held		Non-Ranking Event					LQ	NR	Tournament Not Held													
Thailand Masters (Note: The event was called the Asian Open (1992/1993) and the Thailand Open (1993/1994–1996/1997))	LQ	LQ	LQ	LQ	LQ	LQ	LQ	1R	2R	LQ	NR	Not Held			NR	Tournament Not Held							
Irish Masters	Non-Ranking Event										LQ	LQ	2R	NH	NR	Tournament Not Held							
Northern Ireland Trophy	Tournament Not Held													NR	1R	1R	1R	Tournament Not Held					
Bahrain Championship	Tournament Not Held																2R	Tournament Not Held					
Shanghai Masters	Tournament Not Held															WR	LQ	LQ	LQ	A	NR	Not Held	
Riga Masters	Tournament Not Held																				LQ	Not Held	
World Open (Note: The event was called the Grand Prix (1992/1993–2000/2001 and 2004/2005–2009/2010) and the LG Cup (2001/2002–2003/2004))	LQ	LQ	LQ	LQ	LQ	1R	1R	1R	LQ	1R	2R	1R	SF	2R	RR	1R	LQ	LQ	LQ	A	A	Not Held	
China Open (Note: The event was called the China International (1997/1998–1998/1999))	Tournament Not Held					NR	LQ	LQ	LQ	LQ	Not Held		LQ	LQ	LQ	LQ	LQ	LQ	LQ	A	A	Not Held	
Turkish Masters	Tournament Not Held																					LQ	NH
Gibraltar Open	Tournament Not Held																				A	WD	NH
Former non-ranking tournaments
Irish Open	Tournament Not Held										QF	Tournament Not Held											
Irish Classic	Tournament Not Held															QF	QF	SF	F	A	Not Held		
Shoot Out	Tournament Not Held																		1R	A	Ranking Event		

NH / Not Held	event was not held.
NR / Non-Ranking Event	event is/was no longer a ranking event.
R / Ranking Event	event is/was a ranking event.

== Career finals ==
=== Non-ranking finals: 2 ===
Outcome	No.	Year	Championship	Opponent in the final	Score
Runner-up	1.	2006	Irish Professional Championship	(Republic of Ireland) Ken Doherty	4–9
Runner-up	1.	2010	Irish Classic	(Republic of Ireland) Fergal O'Brien	1–5

=== Amateur finals: 5 (2 titles) ===
Outcome	No.	Year	Championship	Opponent in the final	Score
Winner	1.	2013	Irish Amateur Championship	(Republic of Ireland) Robert Redmond	8–5
Runner-up	1.	2013	IBSF World 6-Reds Snooker Championship	(Wales) Duane Jones	4–6
Runner-up	2.	2014	Irish Amateur Championship	(Republic of Ireland) Martin McCrudden	3–7
Runner-up	3.	2017	European Snooker Open	(Wales) Darren Morgan	1–4
Winner	2.	2018	Irish Amateur Championship (2)	(Republic of Ireland) Rodney Goggins	6–5

=== Seniors finals: 1 (1 title) ===
Outcome	No.	Year	Championship	Opponent in the final	Score
Winner	1.	2019	UK Seniors Championship	(England) Jimmy White	4–2
