= Joe Swail =

Northern Irish snooker player

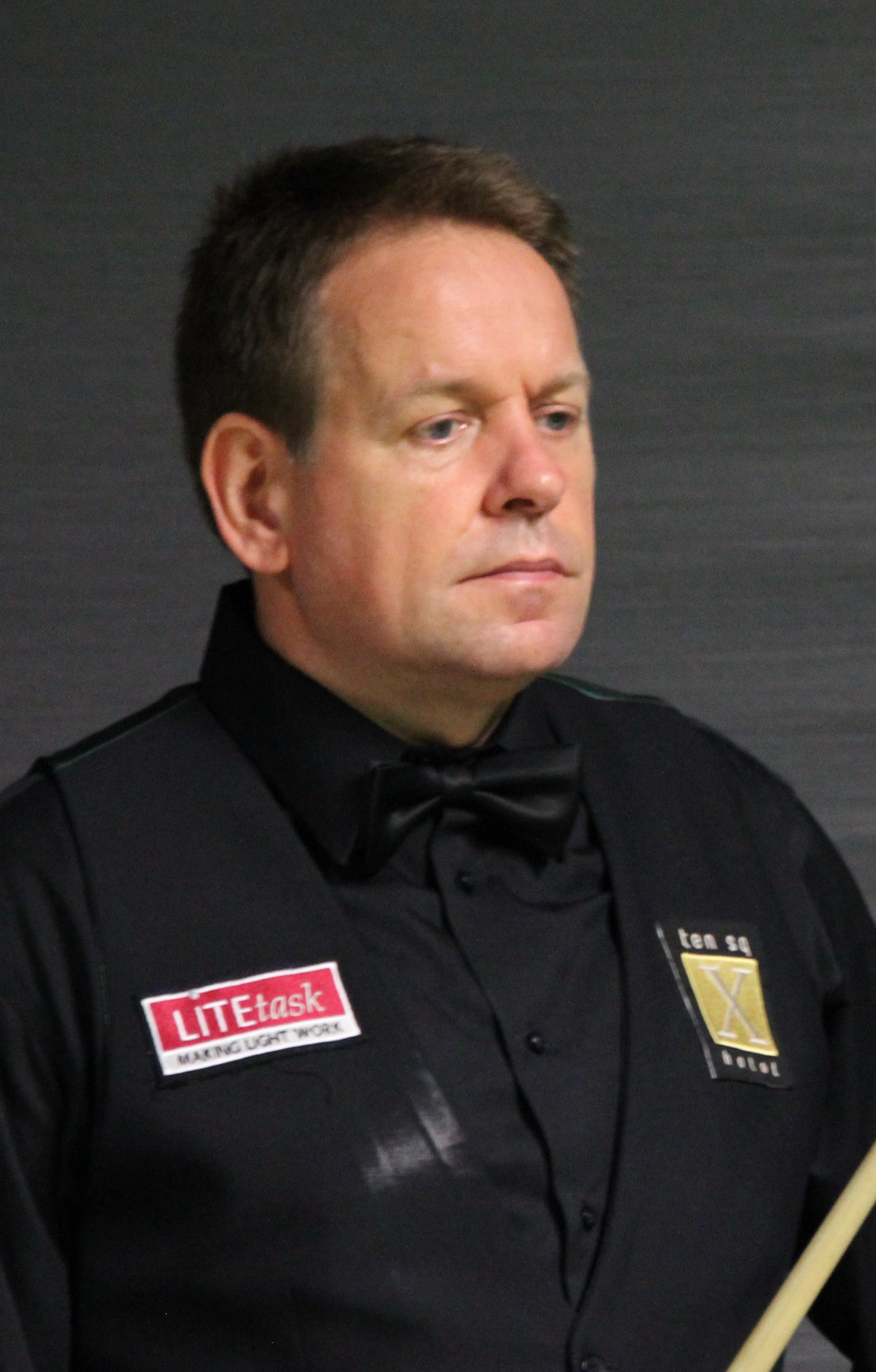
- Swail at the 2016 Paul Hunter Classic

Personal information
- Nickname: The Outlaw
- Born: 29 August 1969 (age 57)

Sport
- Country: Northern Ireland
- Sport: Snooker
- Professional: 1991–2012, 2013–2019
- Highest ranking: 10 (2001/02)
- Century breaks: 124
- Best ranking finish: Runner-up (x1)

Tournament wins
- Minor-ranking: 1

Joe Swail (born 29 August 1969) is a Northern Irish former professional snooker player from Belfast. He retired in May 2019 after being relegated from the tour. He has reached ten major ranking semi-finals, including the 2000 and 2001 World Championships but only one final. Swail is renowned for playing well at the Crucible Theatre, having reached the last 16 on four further occasions. He is also a former English amateur champion and Northern Ireland amateur runner-up, and has captained Northern Ireland internationally. He was Irish champion in 1992 and 2005.

== Career ==
Swail has had a very mixed history in the rankings. He took just two seasons to reach the Top 32, and three to reach the top sixteen, but only remained there for one season, before sliding out of the Top 32 after winning just two matches in 1997–98. His 2000 Crucible achievement made him the second player (after Rex Williams) to return to the Top 16 in the rankings after dropping out of the Top 32 in between. He climbed to No. 10 after his 2001 semi-final, but dropped to 16–27–30–40 in the next few years, finishing with a nightmare season in 2004–05. He then bounced back with an impressive and consistent showing in 2005–06 that brought him back into the Top 32. He came close to the Top 16 in 2006/2007, finishing one place short at 17 despite beating Mark Williams in round 1 of the 2007 World Championships from 0–4 down He came from 7–9 behind to beat Judd Trump 10–9 in qualifying for the 2008 World Championship. Swail scored a comprehensive 10–4 victory over Stephen Lee in the first round at the Crucible, before a 12–13 defeat by Liang Wenbo in the second round, after a trademark comeback from 8–12 down, due to a bad miss on the brown in the decider. This caused him to again miss the top 16, finishing the season in 20th place.

He started 2008–09 poorly, with four successive first-round defeats. His first victory of the season was against Liang Wenbo in qualifying for the 2008 UK Snooker Championship. He then reached his first ever ranking final in his 18-year professional career at the 2009 Welsh Open. Swail led the match 5–2, but never won another frame, losing 9–5 to Ali Carter.

After finishing 69th the end of the 2011–12 season, outside of the top 64 that retain their professional status, Swail dropped of the tour after 21 years as a professional.

As an amateur, Swail played in many of the Players Tour Championship events. At the Paul Hunter Classic, Swail defeated players such as Jimmy White, Shaun Murphy and Barry Hawkins en route to the final, doubling the black ball in a final frame decider against Hawkins. In the final, he was defeated 1–4 by Mark Selby. This not only booked his place on the tour for the following season, but also qualified him for the PTC Finals in Galway, Ireland, where he defeated Stephen Maguire 4–3, despite being 0–3 down. He lost 0–4 in the Last 16 to fellow Northern Irishman Mark Allen. At the 2013 World Snooker Championship, Swail entered the pre-qualifying rounds for amateur players, he won 3 of these matches, as well as his Last 96 and Last 80 matches against Pankaj Advani, and Adam Duffy respectively. He lost his Last 64 match against Mark Joyce 7–10, picking up £4,600 for his efforts.

After regaining his professional status due to his performances in the previous season's PTC events, Swail was able to play in ranking events during the season. He lost in the Last 96 of the Wuxi Classic, 2–5 to Ken Doherty, in the qualifiers for the Australian Open, he beat Darren Cook 5–2, before losing 4–5 in the Last 96 to Pankaj Advani.

== Playing style ==
Swail is known for his very unorthodox way of cueing up. Instead of keeping his cue-arm vertical as most players do, Swail cues up with his arm bent at least 45 degrees outwards, and his elbow towards his back. Although it appears to be extremely difficult to actually pot balls when cueing like that it has worked for Swail and provides him with an abundance of cue power.

== Personal life ==
Swail is congenitally hearing-impaired, and his brother Liam is completely deaf. He has told the BBC that he regards this as an advantage for snooker, as he is less likely to be distracted by crowd and other background noise. Swail's nickname, "the Outlaw", is a pun on his name "Joe Swail" and The Outlaw Josey Wales, the 1976 film. He has a son, Joe Jr. and supports Liverpool F.C.

== Performance and rankings timeline ==
Tournament	1990/ 91	1991/ 92	1992/ 93	1993/ 94	1994/ 95	1995/ 96	1996/ 97	1997/ 98	1998/ 99	1999/ 00	2000/ 01	2001/ 02	2002/ 03	2003/ 04	2004/ 05	2005/ 06	2006/ 07	2007/ 08	2008/ 09	2009/ 10	2010/ 11	2011/ 12	2012/ 13	2013/ 14	2014/ 15	2015/ 16	2016/ 17	2017/ 18	2018/ 19
Ranking (Note: From the 2010/2011 season it shows the ranking at the beginning of the season.)	(Note: He was an amateur.)	(Note: New players on the Main Tour don't have a ranking.)	53	25	12	19	17	22	36	28	16	10	16	27	30	40	30	17	20	22	39	54	(Note: He was not on the Main Tour.)	(Note: New players on the Main Tour don't have a ranking.)	72	64	53	(Note: Players qualified through Q School started the season without prize money ranking points.)	91
Ranking tournaments
Riga Masters (Note: The event was called the Riga Open (2014/2015–2015/2016))	Tournament Not Held																								MR		1R	A	2R
World Open (Note: The event was called the Grand Prix (1991/1992–2000/2001 and 2004/2005–2009/2010) and the LG Cup (2001/2002–2003/2004))	A	LQ	1R	1R	SF	QF	1R	1R	1R	2R	2R	SF	2R	1R	2R	3R	RR	QF	LQ	LQ	LQ	LQ	A	LQ	Not Held		LQ	LQ	LQ
Paul Hunter Classic (Note: The event was called the Grand Prix Fürth (2004/2005) and the Fürth German Open (2005/2006–2006/2007))	Tournament Not Held														Pro-am Event						Minor-Ranking Event						2R	3R	2R
China Championship	Tournament Not Held																										NR	LQ	LQ
European Masters (Note: The event was called the European Open (1991/1992–1996/1997 and 2001/2002–2003/2004), Irish Open (1998/1999) and the Malta Cup (2004/2005–2007/2008))	A	LQ	QF	LQ	1R	SF	1R	NH	LQ	Not Held		1R	2R	2R	1R	1R	LQ	NR	Tournament Not Held								LQ	1R	LQ
English Open	Tournament Not Held																										3R	2R	1R
International Championship	Tournament Not Held																						A	LQ	3R	LQ	LQ	LQ	LQ
Northern Ireland Open	Tournament Not Held																										1R	1R	3R
UK Championship	A	LQ	QF	1R	3R	1R	2R	1R	2R	3R	2R	2R	2R	1R	1R	2R	2R	1R	1R	LQ	LQ	LQ	A	1R	1R	4R	1R	1R	2R
Scottish Open (Note: The event was called the International Open (1992/1993–1996/1997) and the Players Championship (2003/2004))	Not Held		LQ	QF	1R	2R	3R	1R	1R	1R	QF	2R	QF	1R	Tournament Not Held								MR	Not Held			3R	2R	2R
German Masters (Note: The event was called the German Open (1995/1996–1997/1998))	Tournament Not Held					1R	LQ	LQ	NR	Tournament Not Held											QF	LQ	A	LQ	LQ	LQ	LQ	LQ	LQ
World Grand Prix	Tournament Not Held																								NR	DNQ	DNQ	DNQ	DNQ
Welsh Open	A	LQ	SF	3R	QF	1R	2R	1R	SF	2R	QF	QF	2R	2R	2R	3R	2R	1R	F	LQ	LQ	LQ	A	1R	1R	2R	1R	A	2R
Shoot-Out	Tournament Not Held																				Non-Ranking Event						3R	2R	2R
Indian Open	Tournament Not Held																							LQ	2R	NH	2R	LQ	2R
Players Championship (Note: The event was called the Players Tour Championship Grand Finals (2010/2011–2012/2013) and the Players Championship Grand Final (2013/2014–2015/2016))	Tournament Not Held																				DNQ	DNQ	2R	DNQ	DNQ	DNQ	DNQ	DNQ	DNQ
Gibraltar Open	Tournament Not Held																									MR	1R	WD	2R
Tour Championship	Tournament Not Held																												DNQ
China Open (Note: The event was called the China International (1997/1998–1998/1999))	Tournament Not Held							NR	1R	1R	1R	1R	Not Held		LQ	QF	2R	1R	LQ	LQ	LQ	LQ	A	LQ	LQ	LQ	LQ	LQ	LQ
World Championship	A	LQ	1R	LQ	2R	LQ	LQ	1R	LQ	SF	SF	1R	1R	2R	LQ	1R	2R	2R	1R	LQ	LQ	LQ	LQ	LQ	LQ	LQ	LQ	LQ	LQ
Non-ranking tournaments
The Masters	A	LQ	LQ	LQ	1R	LQ	A	LQ	LQ	LQ	WR	1R	WR	LQ	A	LQ	LQ	LQ	LQ	LQ	A	A	A	A	A	A	A	A	A
Championship League	Tournament Not Held																	RR	RR	RR	A	A	A	A	A	A	A	A	A
World Seniors Championship	NH	A	Tournament Not Held																			LQ	A	A	A	LQ	A	A	A
Former ranking tournaments
Classic	LQ	LQ	Tournament Not Held																										
Strachan Open (Note: The event was called the Strachan Challenge (1992/1993–1993/1994))	NH	2R	MR	NR	Tournament Not Held																								
Dubai Classic (Note: The event was called the Thailand Classic in 1995/1996 and the Asian Classic in 1996/1997)	LQ	LQ	1R	1R	1R	QF	LQ	Tournament Not Held																					
Malta Grand Prix	Tournament Not Held				Non-ranking					1R	NR	Tournament Not Held																	
Thailand Masters (Note: The event was called the Asian Open (1991/1992–1992/1993) and the Thailand Open (1993/1994–1996/1997))	LQ	SF	3R	QF	1R	2R	LQ	1R	2R	1R	2R	2R	NR	Not Held			NR	Tournament Not Held											
British Open	LQ	LQ	2R	2R	1R	2R	1R	2R	1R	SF	2R	3R	2R	3R	1R	Tournament Not Held													
Irish Masters	Non-Ranking Event												1R	LQ	LQ	NH	NR	Tournament Not Held											
Northern Ireland Trophy	Tournament Not Held															NR	1R	2R	1R	Tournament Not Held									
Bahrain Championship	Tournament Not Held																		LQ	Tournament Not Held									
Wuxi Classic (Note: The event was called the Jiangsu Classic (2008/2009–2009/2010))	Tournament Not held																		Non-Ranking Event				A	LQ	LQ	Tournament Not Held			
Australian Goldfields Open (Note: The event was called the Australian Open (1994/1995) and Australian Masters (1995/1996))	Tournament Not Held				NR		Tournament Not Held															LQ	A	LQ	LQ	LQ	Not Held		
Shanghai Masters	Tournament Not Held																	LQ	LQ	1R	LQ	LQ	A	LQ	1R	LQ	LQ	LQ	NR
Former non-ranking tournaments
World Masters	1R	Tournament Not Held																											
Kent Cup	W	NH	A	Tournament Not Held																									
King's Cup	W	NH	A	A	A	Tournament Not Held																							
Charity Challenge	Tournament Not Held				1R	A	A	A	A	A	A	A	Tournament Not Held																
Belgian Masters	A	A	A	Not Held		QF	Tournament Not Held																						
Pontins Professional	A	A	A	A	A	A	QF	A	A	A	Tournament Not Held																		
Malta Grand Prix	Tournament Not Held				SF	A	QF	A	A	R	RR	Tournament Not Held																	
Irish Masters	A	A	A	A	SF	SF	A	A	A	A	A	1R	Ranking Event			NH	QF	Tournament Not Held											
Scottish Masters	A	A	A	A	A	A	A	A	A	A	LQ	LQ	LQ	Tournament Not Held															
Irish Open	Tournament Not Held												W	Tournament Not Held															
Northern Ireland Trophy	Tournament Not Held															QF	Ranking Event			Tournament Not Held									
Irish Professional Championship	NH	W	QF	Tournament Not Held												W	QF	QF	Tournament Not Held										
Malta Cup	Ranking Event							Tournament Not Held				Ranking Event						RR	Tournament Not Held								Ranking		
Irish Classic	Tournament Not Held																	QF	SF	W	A	SF	Tournament Not Held						
Six-red World Championship (Note: The event was called the Six-red Snooker International (2008/2009) and the Six-red World Grand Prix (2009/2010))	Tournament Not Held																		2R	A	2R	NH	A	A	A	2R	A	A	A
Shoot-Out	Tournament Not Held																				1R	1R	A	A	1R	SF	Ranking		

Performance Table Legend
LQ	lost in the qualifying draw	#R	lost in the early rounds of the tournament (WR = Wildcard round, RR = Round robin)	QF	lost in the quarter-finals
SF	lost in the semi-finals	F	lost in the final	W	won the tournament
DNQ	did not qualify for the tournament	A	did not participate in the tournament	WD	withdrew from the tournament
DQ	disqualified from the tournament				

NH / Not Held	event was not held.
NR / Non-Ranking Event	event is/was no longer a ranking event.
R / Ranking Event	event is/was a ranking event.
MR / Minor-Ranking Event	event is/was a minor-ranking event.

== Career finals ==
=== Ranking finals: 1 ===
Outcome	No.	Year	Championship	Opponent in the final	Score
Runner-up	1.	2009	Welsh Open	(England) Ali Carter	5–9

=== Minor-ranking finals: 2 (1 title) ===
Outcome	No.	Year	Championship	Opponent in the final	Score
Winner	1.	1992	Strachan Challenge - Event 1	(Netherlands) Stefan Mazrocis	9–4
Runner-up	1.	2012	Paul Hunter Classic	(England) Mark Selby	1–4

=== Non-ranking finals: 7 (7 titles) ===
Outcome	No.	Year	Championship	Opponent in the final	Score
Winner	1.	1990	King's Cup	(Thailand) James Wattana	8–4
Winner	2.	1991	Kent Cup	(Scotland) Marcus Campbell	5–0
Winner	3.	1992	Irish Professional Championship	(Northern Ireland) Jason Prince	9–1
Winner	4.	1998	UK Tour - Event 2	(England) Alfie Burden	6–1
Winner	5.	2003	Irish Open	(Republic of Ireland) Fergal O'Brien	10–3
Winner	6.	2005	Irish Professional Championship (2)	(Republic of Ireland) Ken Doherty	9–7
Winner	7.	2009	Irish Classic	(Republic of Ireland) Fergal O'Brien	5–0

=== Pro-am finals: 12 (5 titles) ===
Outcome	No.	Year	Championship	Opponent in the final	Score
Runner-up	1.	1990	Pontins Autumn Open	(England) Anthony Hamilton	1–5
Runner-up	2.	2003	Barry McNamee Memorial Trophy	(Republic of Ireland) Ken Doherty	5–6
Winner	1.	2005	Pontins Autumn Open	(England) Dave Harold	5–3
Winner	2.	2006	Barry McNamee Memorial Trophy	(Northern Ireland) Jordan Brown	6–1
Runner-up	3.	2007	Barry McNamee Memorial Trophy (2)	(Northern Ireland) Mark Allen	1–3
Runner-up	4.	2008	Dutch Open	(England) Stuart Bingham	3–6
Runner-up	5.	2009	Barry McNamee Memorial Trophy (3)	(Northern Ireland) Jordan Brown	1–3
Runner-up	6.	2011	Barry McNamee Memorial Trophy (4)	(Northern Ireland) Patrick Wallace	2–3
Winner	3.	2014	Barry McNamee Memorial Trophy (2)	(Republic of Ireland) Michael Judge	3–0
Winner	4.	2015	Barry McNamee Memorial Trophy (3)	(Northern Ireland) Patrick Wallace	3–0
Winner	5.	2017	Barry McNamee Memorial Trophy (4)	(Republic of Ireland) Rodney Goggins	3–2
Runner-up	7.	2018	PMK Invitational Pro-Am	(Scotland) Graeme Dott	0–4

=== Amateur finals: 4 (2 titles) ===
Outcome	No.	Year	Championship	Opponent in the final	Score
Runner-up	1.	1988	Northern Ireland Amateur Championship	(Northern Ireland) Paul Doran	7–10
Winner	1.	1988	British Under-19 Amateur Championship	(England) Anton Bishop	3–0
Winner	2.	1990	English Amateur Championship	(Scotland) Alan McManus	13–11
Runner-up	2.	1991	Northern Ireland Amateur Championship (2)	(Northern Ireland) Michael Duffy	9–10
