= 1995 Irish Masters =

Irish Masters
Tournament information
- Dates: 21–26 March 1995
- Venue: Goffs
- City: Kill
- Country: Ireland
- Organisation: WPBSA
- Format: Non-Ranking event
- Total prize fund: £200,000
- Winner's share: £70,000
- Highest break: Dave Harold (ENG) (138)

Final
- Champion: (England) Peter Ebdon
- Runner-up: (Scotland) Stephen Hendry
- Score: 9–8

The 1995 Irish Masters was the twenty-first edition of the professional invitational snooker tournament, which took place from 21 to 26 March 1995. The tournament was played at Goffs in Kill, County Kildare, and featured twelve professional players.

Peter Ebdon won the title for the first time, beating Stephen Hendry 9–8 in the final.

== Main draw ==
Round 1 Best of 9 frames
(England) Peter Ebdon	5
(Wales) Darren Morgan	4
(England) John Parrott	5
(England) Ronnie O'Sullivan	2
(Republic of Ireland) Ken Doherty	5
(England) Dave Harold	3
(Northern Ireland) Joe Swail	5
(Scotland) Alan McManus	1

Quarter-finals; Best of 9 frames
(England) Peter Ebdon	5
(England) Steve Davis	4
(England) John Parrott	5
(England) Jimmy White	4
(Scotland) Stephen Hendry	5
(Republic of Ireland) Ken Doherty	4
(Northern Ireland) Joe Swail	5
(Thailand) James Wattana	3

Semi-finals; Best of 11 frames
(England) Peter Ebdon	6
(England) John Parrott	3
(Scotland) Stephen Hendry	6
(Northern Ireland) Joe Swail	3

Final; Best of 17 frames
(England) Peter Ebdon	9
(Scotland) Stephen Hendry	8
