= Fergal O'Brien =

Irish retired snooker player (born 1972)

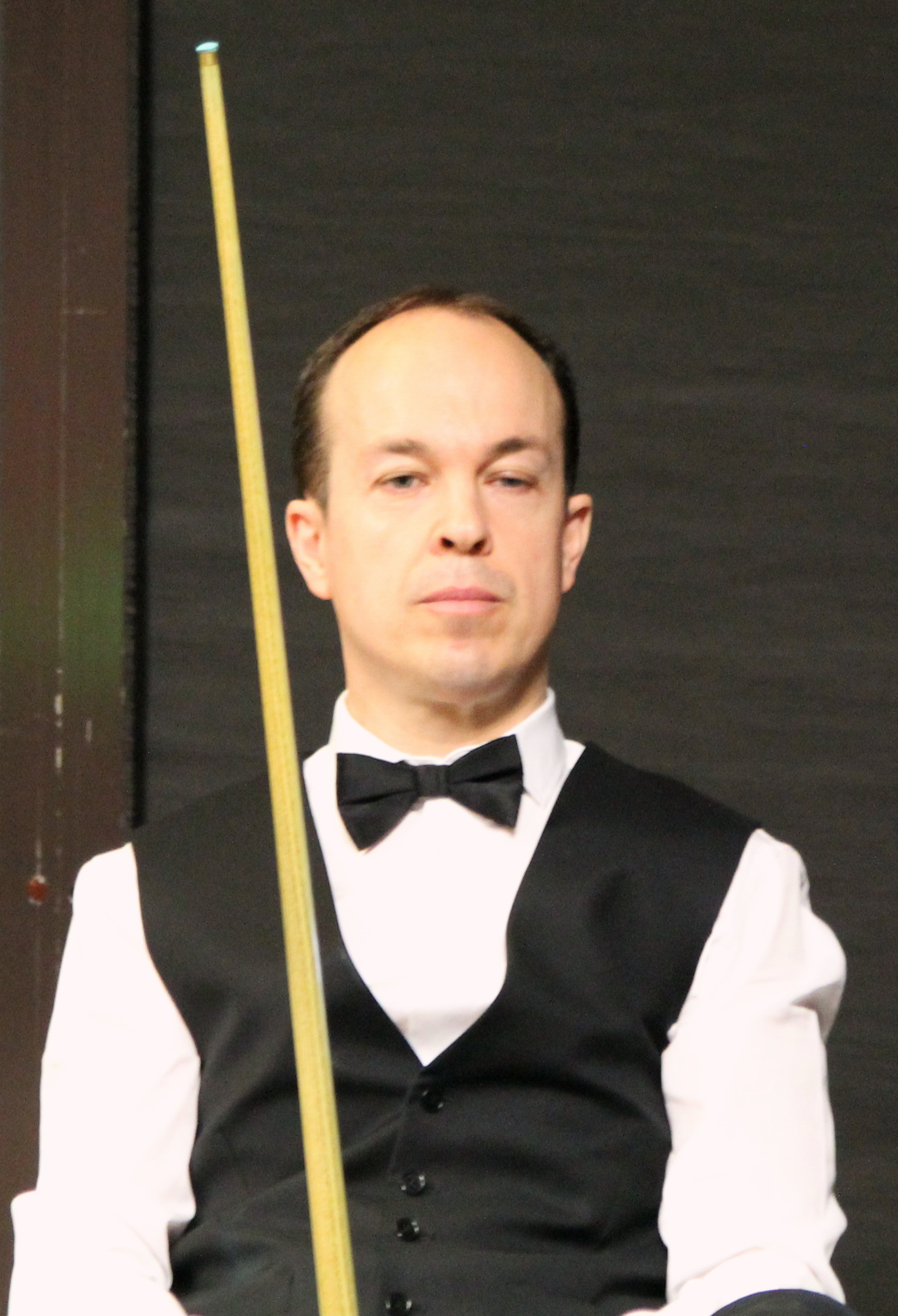
- O'Brien at the 2016 Paul Hunter Classic

Personal information
- Nickname: Fearless Fergal
- Born: 8 March 1972 (age 54) County Dublin, Ireland

Sport
- Country: Ireland
- Sport: Snooker
- Professional: 1991–2024
- Highest ranking: 9 (2000/01)
- Maximum breaks: 1
- Century breaks: 240

Tournament wins
- Ranking: 1

Fergal O'Brien (born 8 March 1972) is an Irish retired professional snooker player who competed on the World Snooker Tour from 1991 to 2024. He won one ranking title during his career, defeating Anthony Hamilton 9–7 in the final of the 1999 British Open. He was runner-up at the 2001 Masters, where he lost the final 9–10 to Paul Hunter. His best performance at the World Snooker Championship was reaching the quarter-finals of the 2000 event, where he lost 5–13 to eventual champion Mark Williams. He reached his highest world ranking of ninth in the 2000–01 season, but spent only three seasons of his 33-year career ranked inside the top 16. He retired from professional competition at the end of the 2023–24 season, intending to remain active in the sport as a coach and a commentator for Eurosport.

== Career ==
O'Brien is the only player to score a century in their first frame at the World Championships in the Crucible, which he achieved against Alan McManus in 1994 (though he lost the match 10–7 and did not qualify again until 1998). His greatest achievement was winning the British Open in 1999, beating Anthony Hamilton 9–7 in the final. Hamilton opened with two centuries, but O'Brien won five frames on the final black to defeat the Nottingham man.

O'Brien also came close to winning the Masters title in 2001. After beating Mark Williams, Ken Doherty and Dave Harold, he lost in the final to Paul Hunter after leading 7–3. He has reached one further ranking final, and three semi-finals

O'Brien peaked at No. 9 in the rankings following his sole title, but nosedived after this. He narrowly retained his top 16 place for the 2001/2002 season, but dropped out a year later – and then out of the top 32 a year later. Three further falls down the rankings left him at No. 45, before beginning to recover.

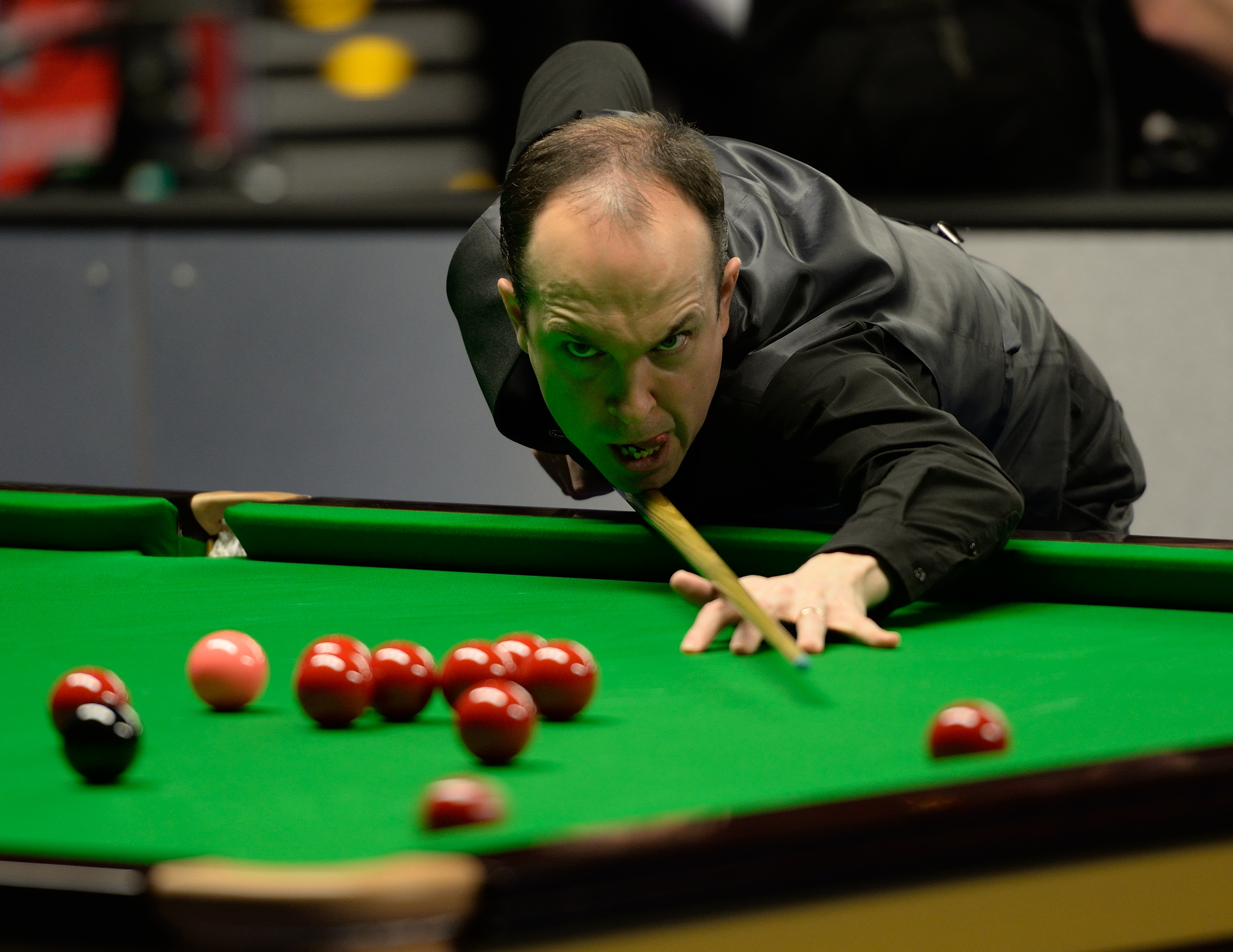
Fergal O'Brien at 2015 German Masters

O'Brien started the 2007–08 campaign in Shanghai where he had beaten Paul Davies and Barry Hawkins in qualifying rounds, however, he lost to Steve Davis in the first round. O'Brien also qualified for the Grand Prix but lost four of his group matches to finish 5th in his group ahead of only Graeme Dott.

After qualifying for the main draw of the 2007 Northern Ireland Trophy by beating Barry Pinches in a deciding frame, O'Brien went on to beat Dave Harold in the first round of the main draw. Victories over John Higgins (in a decider), Barry Hawkins and Ronnie O'Sullivan, before he reached the second ranking-event final of his career by beating Mark Allen by 6 frames to 3. He lost the final to Stephen Maguire, 5–9. This run helped him return to the top 32 of the Snooker world rankings 2007/2008, but the early part of the 2008–09 season proved disappointing, O'Brien not reaching the last sixteen of any of the first four tournaments.

He qualified for the Players Tour Championship 2011/2012 – Finals held in Galway but lost his Last 24 match 0–4 to Joe Perry.

On 12 April 2017, O’Brien qualified for the 2017 World Snooker Championship after a record-breaking victory in the final qualifying round match against David Gilbert. The final frame set the record for the longest frame of the modern era, lasting 123 minutes and 41 seconds.

== Performance and rankings timeline ==
Tourname	1991/ 92	1992/ 93	1993/ 94	1994/ 95	1995/ 96	1996/ 97	1997/ 98	1998/ 99	1999/ 00	2000/ 01	2001/ 02	2002/ 03	2003/ 04	2004/ 05	2005/ 06	2006/ 07	2007/ 08	2008/ 09	2009/ 10	2010/ 11	2011/ 12	2012/ 13	2013/ 14	2014/ 15	2015/ 16	2016/ 17	2017/ 18	2018/ 19	2019/ 20	2020/ 21	2021/ 22	2022/ 23	2023/ 24
Ranking (Note: From the 2010/2011 season it shows the ranking at the beginning of the season)	(Note: New players on the Main Tour don't have a ranking)	192	100	42	38	36	23	20	11	9	16	23	33	41	44	46	37	24	31	47	37	34	36	31	27	40	45	51	63	(Note: Players qualified One Year Ranking List started the season without ranking points)	76	(Note: Players qualified through Q School started the season without ranking points)	94
Ranking tournaments
Championship League	Tournament Not Held																Non-Ranking Event													RR	2R	RR	RR
European Masters (Note: The event was called the European Open (1991/1992–1996/1997 and 2001/2002–2003/2004), the Irish Open (1998/1999) and the Malta Cup (2004/2005–2007/2008))	LQ	LQ	2R	LQ	LQ	LQ	NH	LQ	Not Held		2R	LQ	1R	LQ	LQ	2R	NR	Tournament Not Held								LQ	LQ	2R	1R	1R	1R	A	A
British Open	LQ	LQ	LQ	LQ	3R	1R	1R	W	3R	2R	3R	3R	3R	LQ	Tournament Not Held																1R	LQ	3R
English Open	Tournament Not Held																									3R	1R	1R	3R	1R	2R	LQ	1R
Wuhan Open	Tournament Not Held																																A
Northern Ireland Open	Tournament Not Held																									3R	1R	1R	3R	2R	1R	LQ	LQ
International Championship	Tournament Not Held																					1R	3R	2R	2R	1R	LQ	LQ	LQ	Not Held			A
UK Championship	LQ	1R	1R	3R	LQ	LQ	1R	QF	1R	QF	2R	1R	3R	LQ	LQ	LQ	LQ	LQ	LQ	LQ	LQ	1R	3R	1R	2R	3R	1R	1R	1R	1R	1R	LQ	LQ
Shoot Out	Tournament Not Held																			Non-Ranking Event						4R	2R	1R	1R	A	1R	3R	A
Scottish Open (Note: The event was called the International Open (1992/1993–1996/1997) and the Players Championship (2003/2004))	NH	2R	LQ	LQ	2R	LQ	SF	3R	3R	2R	2R	1R	LQ	Tournament Not Held								MR	Not Held			2R	1R	1R	1R	1R	3R	LQ	LQ
World Grand Prix	Tournament Not Held																							NR	DNQ	DNQ	DNQ	DNQ	DNQ	DNQ	DNQ	DNQ	DNQ
German Masters (Note: The event was called the German Open (1995/1996–1997/1998))	Tournament Not Held				LQ	LQ	LQ	NR	Tournament Not Held											LQ	LQ	LQ	1R	1R	1R	LQ	1R	1R	LQ	2R	LQ	LQ	A
Welsh Open	LQ	LQ	3R	3R	2R	QF	3R	3R	QF	2R	QF	LQ	LQ	LQ	1R	LQ	LQ	1R	1R	LQ	1R	1R	2R	1R	3R	3R	1R	1R	1R	1R	2R	LQ	LQ
Players Championship (Note: The event was called the Players Tour Championship Grand Finals (2010/2011–2015/2016))	Tournament Not Held																			DNQ	1R	DNQ	2R	DNQ	DNQ	DNQ	DNQ	DNQ	DNQ	DNQ	DNQ	DNQ	DNQ
World Open (Note: The event was called the Grand Prix (1991/1992–2000/2001 and 2004/2005–2009/2010), the LG Cup (2001/2002–2003/2004) and the Haikou World Open (2011/2012–2013/2014))	LQ	LQ	LQ	LQ	QF	2R	1R	2R	2R	3R	2R	3R	LQ	1R	2R	RR	RR	LQ	LQ	1R	LQ	LQ	LQ	Not Held		1R	LQ	3R	2R	Not Held			A
Tour Championship	Tournament Not Held																											DNQ	DNQ	DNQ	DNQ	DNQ	DNQ
World Championship	LQ	LQ	1R	LQ	LQ	LQ	2R	1R	QF	1R	1R	LQ	LQ	1R	LQ	2R	LQ	LQ	1R	LQ	LQ	LQ	LQ	LQ	LQ	1R	LQ	LQ	LQ	LQ	LQ	LQ	LQ
Non-ranking tournaments
The Masters	LQ	LQ	LQ	LQ	LQ	LQ	LQ	LQ	1R	F	QF	LQ	LQ	A	LQ	LQ	LQ	LQ	LQ	A	A	A	A	A	A	A	A	A	A	A	A	A	A
Championship League	Tournament Not Held																RR	A	A	A	A	A	A	RR	RR	A	A	A	A	A	A	A	A
World Seniors Championship	A	Tournament Not Held																		A	A	A	A	F	1R	A	A	NH	A	A	A	A	A
Former ranking tournaments
Classic	LQ	Tournament Not Held																															
Strachan Open (Note: The event was called the Strachan Challenge (1992/1993–1993/1994))	LQ	MR	NR	Tournament Not Held																													
Asian Classic (Note: The event was called the Dubai Classic (1991/1992–1994/1995) and the Thailand Classic (1995/1996))	LQ	LQ	LQ	LQ	1R	1R	Tournament Not Held																										
Malta Grand Prix	Not Held			Non-Ranking Event					2R	NR	Tournament Not Held																						
Thailand Masters (Note: The event was called the Asian Open (1991/1992–1992/1993) and the Thailand Open (1993/1994–1996/1997))	LQ	3R	LQ	LQ	LQ	QF	2R	LQ	1R	2R	QF	NR	Not Held			NR	Tournament Not Held																
Irish Masters	Non-Ranking Event											LQ	LQ	LQ	NH	NR	Tournament Not Held																
Northern Ireland Trophy	Tournament Not Held														NR	LQ	F	1R	Tournament Not Held														
Bahrain Championship	Tournament Not Held																	LQ	Tournament Not Held														
Wuxi Classic (Note: The event was called the Jiangsu Classic (2008/2009–2009/2010))	Tournament Not Held																	Non-Ranking Event				2R	1R	1R	Tournament Not Held								
Australian Goldfields Open (Note: The event was called the Australian Open (1994/1995–1995/1996) and the Australian Masters (1995/1996))	Not Held			Non-Ranking		Tournament Not Held															LQ	LQ	2R	2R	2R	Tournament Not Held							
Shanghai Masters	Tournament Not Held																1R	1R	LQ	LQ	2R	WR	LQ	QF	LQ	LQ	2R	Non-Ranking		Not Held			NR
Paul Hunter Classic (Note: The event was called the Grand Prix Fürth (2004/2005) and the Fürth German Open (2005/2006–2006/2007))	Tournament Not Held													Pro-am Event						Minor-Ranking Event						2R	2R	2R	NR	Tournament Not Held			
Indian Open	Tournament Not Held																						2R	1R	NH	LQ	2R	1R	Tournament Not Held				
China Open (Note: The event was called the China International (1997/1998–1998/1999))	Tournament Not Held						NR	LQ	LQ	1R	1R	Not Held		LQ	LQ	LQ	1R	1R	1R	LQ	WR	LQ	2R	1R	LQ	1R	2R	LQ	Tournament Not Held				
Riga Masters (Note: The event was called the Riga Open (2014/2015–2015/2016))	Tournament Not Held																							MR		2R	LQ	1R	LQ	Tournament Not Held			
China Championship	Tournament Not Held																									NR	QF	2R	LQ	Tournament Not Held			
WST Pro Series	Tournament Not Held																													2R	Not Held		
Turkish Masters	Tournament Not Held																														LQ	Not Held	
Gibraltar Open	Tournament Not Held																								MR	1R	1R	2R	4R	1R	1R	Not Held	
WST Classic	Tournament Not Held																															1R	NH
Former non-ranking tournaments
Finnish Masters	Tournament Not Held				SF	Tournament Not Held																											
China Masters	Tournament Not Held				SF	Tournament Not Held																											
Pakistan Masters	Tournament Not Held				SF	Tournament Not Held																											
Malta Grand Prix	Not Held			A	A	A	A	A	R	SF	Tournament Not Held																						
Champions Cup (Note: The event was called the Charity Challenge (1994/1995–1998/1999))	Not Held			A	A	A	A	A	RR	A	A	Tournament Not Held																					
Scottish Masters	A	A	A	A	A	A	A	A	1R	1R	LQ	LQ	Tournament Not Held																				
Irish Open	Tournament Not Held											F	Tournament Not Held																				
Irish Masters	A	A	SF	A	A	A	QF	A	1R	1R	1R	Ranking Event			NH	SF	Tournament Not Held																
Irish Professional Championship	SF	1R	Tournament Not Held												SF	QF	F	Tournament Not Held															
Irish Classic	Tournament Not Held																F	F	F	W	W	Tournament Not Held											
Shoot Out	Tournament Not Held																			3R	2R	1R	1R	1R	A	Ranking Event							

Performance Table Legend
LQ	lost in the qualifying draw	#R	lost in the early rounds of the tournament (WR = Wildcard round, RR = Round robin)	QF	lost in the quarter-finals
SF	lost in the semi-finals	F	lost in the final	W	won the tournament
DNQ	did not qualify for the tournament	A	did not participate in the tournament	WD	withdrew from the tournament
DQ	disqualified from the tournament				

NH / Not Held	event was not held.
NR / Non-Ranking Event	event is/was no longer a ranking event.
R / Ranking Event	event is/was a ranking event.
MR / Minor-Ranking Event	event is/was a minor-ranking event.

== Career finals ==
=== Ranking finals: 2 (1 title) ===
Outcome	No.	Year	Championship	Opponent in the final	Score
Winner	1.	1999	British Open	(England) Anthony Hamilton	9–7
Runner-up	1.	2007	Northern Ireland Trophy	(Scotland) Stephen Maguire	5–9

=== Minor-ranking finals: 1 ===
Outcome	No.	Year	Championship	Opponent in the final	Score
Runner-up	1	2014	Gdynia Open	(England) Shaun Murphy	1–4

=== Non-ranking finals: 8 (2 titles) ===
Legend
The Masters (0–1)
Other (2–5)

Outcome	No.	Year	Championship	Opponent in the final	Score
Runner-up	1.	2001	The Masters	(England) Paul Hunter	9–10
Runner-up	2.	2003	Irish Open	(Northern Ireland) Joe Swail	3–10
Runner-up	3.	2007	Irish Professional Championship	(Republic of Ireland) Ken Doherty	2–9
Runner-up	4.	2007	Irish Classic	(Republic of Ireland) David Morris	3–5
Runner-up	5.	2008	Irish Classic (2)	(Republic of Ireland) Ken Doherty	2–5
Runner-up	6.	2009	Irish Classic (3)	(Northern Ireland) Joe Swail	0–5
Winner	1.	2010	Irish Classic	(Republic of Ireland) Michael Judge	5–1
Winner	2.	2011	Irish Classic (2)	(Republic of Ireland) Ken Doherty	5–2

=== Team finals: 1 ===
Outcome	No.	Year	Championship	Team	Opponent(s) in the final	Score
Runner-up	1.	1996	World Cup	Ireland	Scotland	7–10

=== Seniors finals: 1 ===
Outcome	No.	Year	Championship	Opponent in the final	Score
Runner-up	1.	2015	World Seniors Championship	(Wales) Mark Williams	1–2
