= Patrick Wallace =

Northern Irish snooker player

Personal information
- Born: 20 September 1969 (age 57)

Sport
- Country: Northern Ireland
- Sport: Snooker
- Professional: 1994–1997, 1998–2006, 2007–2011
- Highest ranking: 34 (2001/02)
- Best ranking finish: Quarter-final (x1)

Patrick Wallace (born 20 September 1969) is a former professional snooker player from Dungannon in Northern Ireland. During his career, which lasted seventeen years from 1994 to 2011, he won one non-ranking title and was a quarter-finalist in the 2001 World Championship.

He attained his highest world ranking, 34th, for the 2001–02 season, but dropped off the main tour several times, latterly in 2011. Thereafter Wallace retired as a professional and resumed his career at amateur level for a number of years. His nine wins in the Northern Ireland Amateur Championship are a record.

== Career ==
=== Amateur ===
After winning the N. Ireland Championship in 1993, Wallace reached the semi-finals of the World Amateur Snooker Championship in Pakistan in December. He led eventual champion Tai Pichit 7–4 before losing 8–7.

=== Professional ===
Wallace turned professional in 1994 and reached the last 32 of the Benson & Hedges Championship, where he lost 1–5 to Rod Lawler. He won four qualifying round matches to appear in the last 128 at the 1995 International Open, but there his progress was halted by a 2–5 defeat to Yasin Merchant of India.

In his second season on the main tour, he improved his personal best performance, recording five victories in the 1995 Grand prix before losing 3–5 in the last 96 to Mark King. He was invited to participate in the 1996 Malta Masters, a sixteen-man event, where he won his first match 4–3 against Tony Drago, but Martin Dziewialtowski beat him 4–1 in their quarter-final.

Wallace did not progress in the following season, dropping from the tour in 1997. However, he beat Shaun Murphy 6–4 in the final of Event 4 of the UK Tour in 1998 to secure his immediate return, and at the 1999 Welsh Open, he recorded a last-16 finish for the first time in his career. Wallace beat Mark Miller, Wayne Brown, Quinten Hann, Ken Doherty, and Tony Chappel, and held James Wattana to 2–2 before losing 2–5.

This performance was sufficient for Wallace's ranking to rise from 150th to 84th in time for the 1999–2000 season, and although that season heralded no great results, his run to the final qualifying round of the 2000 World Championship - where eventual quarter-finalist Dominic Dale beat him 10–8 - saw him enter the top 64 for the first time, finishing at 59th.

The 2000/2001 season was also largely quiet for Wallace, a last-48 showing in the UK Championship, where he again lost to Dale, his best until that season's World Championship. Entering at the last-96 stage, he beat Nick Walker 10–2 and Simon Bedford 10–9 to reach the final qualifying round. Wallace trailed Joe Perry 0–2 but recovered to win convincingly, 10–4, and thus reached the final stages at the Crucible Theatre for the first time. At the Crucible, he was drawn against Alan McManus and, against expectations, Wallace prevailed 10–2; he then won his next match 13–5 against Mark King to reach the quarter-finals. Drawn to play his friend and fellow countryman Joe Swail, this match proved a tighter affair; Wallace led 6–2 and 7–4 but could not prevent an 11–13 loss. Assured of £36,500 in prize money, he went into the 2001/2002 season ranked 34th, his highest-ever position.

The season did not reflect his impressive result at the World Championship, as he could not progress beyond the last 48 in any of the eleven tournaments he entered, and 2002–03 was no better; although he again came within one win of reaching the Crucible, Ali Carter beat him 10–8, and his ranking for the 2003/2004 season dropped to 50th.

In the years that followed, Wallace struggled for results, his ranking eventually falling to 74th in the 2005/2006 season, and accordingly he was relegated from the tour again in 2006. He won the Northern Ireland Amateur Championship for the third time in 2007, defeating Joe Meara 10–5 in the final, and received a wildcard to compete again on the main tour as the Northern Ireland nomination; however, he could not recapture the stellar form he showed in 2001, and from this point until his latest relegation from the tour in 2011, he never broke back into the top 64. He remains the only player ever to have reached the quarter-finals of the World Championship in their only appearance at the televised stages.

After retiring in 2011, Wallace participated in the qualifying rounds for the 2012 World Snooker Championship. He defeated John Parrott 5–0 in the first preliminary qualifying round before beating Joe Delaney 5–2 in the second preliminary round; however, he was defeated in the second qualifying round 10–9 by Yu Delu.

=== Amateur ===
Since retiring as a professional Wallace has continued as an amateur, and has won the Northern Ireland Championship a record nine times; he had been holding the title between 2012 and 2016.

In 2016 Wallace received an invitation as a wildcard to the 2016 Northern Ireland Open, where he lost in the first round 2–4 to Michael Georgiou. Having qualified for the 2018 World Seniors Championship, he came within one frame of winning the title, overcoming Simon Dent 3–0, Rhydian Richards 3–1 and Jonathan Bagley 3–2, but surrendered a 3–1 lead against fellow qualifier Aaron Canavan in the final to lose 3–4.

== Outside snooker ==
Wallace is an accountancy graduate from Queen's University Belfast (1992). He captained the Queen's team to the British Universities title at Leeds in 1992.

== Performance and rankings timeline ==
Tournament	1994/ 95	1995/ 96	1996/ 97	1997/ 98	1998/ 99	1999/ 00	2000/ 01	2001/ 02	2002/ 03	2003/ 04	2004/ 05	2005/ 06	2007/ 08	2008/ 09	2009/ 10	2010/ 11	2011/ 12	2012/ 13	2016/ 17	2018/ 19	2019/ 20	2020/ 21
Ranking (Note: From the 2010/2011 season it shows the ranking at the beginning of the season.)	(Note: New players on the Main Tour don't have a ranking.)	285	194	(Note: He was not on the Main Tour.)	150	84	59	34	36	50	39	50		69	73	68	(Note: He was an amateur.)					
Ranking tournaments
European Masters (Note: The event was called the European Open (1994/1995–1996/1997 & 2001/2002–2003/2004), Irish Open (1998/1999) and Malta Cup (2004/2005–2007/2008))	LQ	LQ	LQ	NH	LQ	Not Held		LQ	LQ	LQ	LQ	LQ	NR	Tournament Not Held					A	A	A	A
Northern Ireland Open	Tournament Not Held																		1R	1R	1R	2R
UK Championship	LQ	LQ	LQ	A	2R	LQ	1R	LQ	LQ	LQ	LQ	LQ	LQ	LQ	LQ	1R	A	A	A	A	A	A
Scottish Open (Note: The event was called the International Open (1994/1995–1997/1998) and the Players Championship (2003/2004))	LQ	LQ	LQ	A	LQ	LQ	LQ	LQ	2R	LQ	Tournament Not Held							MR	A	A	A	A
German Masters (Note: The event was called the German Open (1995/1996–1997/1998))	NH	LQ	LQ	A	NR	Tournament Not Held										LQ	A	A	A	A	A	A
Welsh Open	LQ	LQ	LQ	A	3R	LQ	LQ	LQ	LQ	1R	LQ	1R	LQ	LQ	LQ	LQ	A	A	A	A	A	A
Players Championship (Note: The event was called the Players Tour Championship Grand Finals (2010/2011–2012/2013) and the Players Championship Grand Final (2013/2014–2015/2016))	Tournament Not Held															DNQ	DNQ	DNQ	DNQ	DNQ	DNQ	DNQ
World Championship	LQ	LQ	LQ	LQ	LQ	LQ	QF	LQ	LQ	LQ	LQ	LQ	LQ	LQ	LQ	LQ	LQ	LQ	WD	A	A	A
Non-ranking tournaments
The Masters	LQ	LQ	LQ	LQ	LQ	LQ	LQ	LQ	LQ	LQ	A	LQ	A	A	A	A	A	A	A	A	A	A
Former ranking tournaments
Dubai Classic (Note: The event was called the Thailand Classic (1995/1996) and the Asian Classic (1996/1997))	LQ	LQ	LQ	Tournament Not Held																		
Malta Grand Prix	Non-Ranking Event					LQ	NR	Tournament Not Held														
Thailand Masters (Note: The event was called the Thailand Open (1994/1995–1996/1997))	LQ	LQ	LQ	LQ	LQ	LQ	1R	LQ	NR	Tournament Not Held			NR	Tournament Not Held								
British Open	LQ	LQ	LQ	LQ	LQ	LQ	LQ	1R	LQ	1R	LQ	Tournament Not Held										
Irish Masters	Non-Ranking Event								LQ	1R	LQ	NH	NR	Tournament Not Held								
Northern Ireland Trophy	Tournament Not Held											NR	LQ	LQ	Tournament Not Held							
Bahrain Championship	Tournament Not Held													LQ	Tournament Not Held							
Shanghai Masters	Tournament Not Held												LQ	LQ	LQ	LQ	A	A	A	Non-Ranking		NH
China Open (Note: The event was called the China International (1997/1998–1998/1999))	Tournament Not Held			NR	LQ	LQ	LQ	LQ	Not Held		LQ	LQ	LQ	LQ	LQ	LQ	A	A	A	A	Not Held	
World Open (Note: The event was called the Grand Prix (1994/1995–2000/2001 and 2004/2005–2009/2010), the LG Cup (2001/2002–2003/2004) and the Haikou World Open (2011/2012–2013/2014))	LQ	LQ	LQ	A	1R	LQ	2R	1R	3R	2R	1R	LQ	LQ	LQ	LQ	LQ	A	A	A	A	A	NH
Former non-ranking tournaments
Belgian Masters	A	QF	Tournament Not Held																			
Malta Masters	NH	QF	Tournament Not Held																			
Poland Masters	NH	F	Tournament Not Held																			
Scottish Masters	A	A	A	A	A	A	A	1R	A	Tournament Not Held												
Irish Open	Tournament Not Held								QF	Tournament Not Held												
Irish Professional Championship	Tournament Not Held											1R	1R	Tournament Not Held								

Performance Table Legend
LQ	lost in the qualifying draw	#R	lost in the early rounds of the tournament (WR = Wildcard round, RR = Round robin)	QF	lost in the quarter-finals
SF	lost in the semi-finals	F	lost in the final	W	won the tournament
DNQ	did not qualify for the tournament	A	did not participate in the tournament	WD	withdrew from the tournament

NH / Not Held	means an event was not held.
NR / Non-Ranking Event	means an event is/was no longer a ranking event.
R / Ranking Event	means an event is/was a ranking event.
MR / Minor-Ranking Event	means an event is/was a minor-ranking event.
PA / Pro-am Event	means an event is/was a pro-am event.

== Career finals ==
=== Non-ranking finals: 2 (1 title) ===
Outcome	No.	Year	Championship	Opponent in the final	Score
Runner-up	1.	1996	Poland Masters	(Northern Ireland) Gerard Greene	5–6
Winner	1.	1998	UK Tour – Event 4	(England) Shaun Murphy	6–4

=== Amateur finals: 9 (8 titles) ===
Outcome	No.	Year	Championship	Opponent in the final	Score
Winner	1.	1993	Northern Ireland Amateur Championship	(Northern Ireland) Kieran Erwin	10–8
Winner	2.	2000	Northern Ireland Amateur Championship	(Northern Ireland) Barry McNamee	10–2
Winner	3.	2007	Northern Ireland Amateur Championship	(Northern Ireland) Joe Meara	10–5
Winner	4.	2012	Northern Ireland Amateur Championship	(Northern Ireland) Dermot McGlinchey	10–4
Winner	5.	2013	Northern Ireland Amateur Championship	(Northern Ireland) Jordan Brown	10–4
Winner	6.	2014	Northern Ireland Amateur Championship	(Northern Ireland) Raymond McAllister	10–4
Winner	7.	2015	Northern Ireland Amateur Championship	(Northern Ireland) Jordan Brown	10–2
Winner	8.	2016	Northern Ireland Amateur Championship	(Northern Ireland) Jordan Brown	10–8
Runner-up	1.	2018	Northern Ireland Amateur Championship	(Northern Ireland) Jordan Brown	5–10

=== Seniors finals: 1 ===
Outcome	No.	Year	Championship	Opponent in the final	Score
Runner-up	1.	2018	World Seniors Championship	(Jersey) Aaron Canavan	3–4
