= 2001–02 snooker season =

Details
- Duration: 11 August 2001 – 12 May 2002
- Tournaments: 21 (9 ranking events)

Triple Crown winners
- UK Championship: (England) Ronnie O'Sullivan
- Masters: (England) Paul Hunter
- World Championship: (England) Peter Ebdon

The 2001–02 snooker season was a series of snooker tournaments played between 11 August 2001 and 12 May 2002. The following table outlines the results for ranking events and the invitational events.

== Calendar ==
=== World Snooker Tour ===
Start	Finish	Country	Tournament name	Venue	City	Winner	Runner-up	Score	Ref.
11 Aug	19 Aug	ENG	Champions Cup	Brighton Centre	Brighton	(Scotland) John Higgins	(Wales) Mark Williams	7–4	
18 Sep	23 Sep	SCO	Scottish Masters	Thistle Hotels	Glasgow	(Scotland) John Higgins	(England) Ronnie O'Sullivan	9–6	
29 Sep	7 Oct	ENG	British Open	Telewest Arena	Newcastle	(Scotland) John Higgins	(Scotland) Graeme Dott	9–6	
13 Oct	21 Oct	ENG	LG Cup	Guild Hall	Preston	(England) Stephen Lee	(England) Peter Ebdon	9–4	
4 Nov	15 Nov	ENG	Benson & Hedges Championship	Towers Snooker Club	Mansfield	(Wales) Ryan Day	(Scotland) Hugh Abernethy	9–5	
23 Nov	1 Dec	MLT	European Open	Mediterranean Conference Centre	Valletta	(Scotland) Stephen Hendry	(England) Joe Perry	9–2	
3 Dec	16 Dec	ENG	UK Championship	Barbican Centre	York	(England) Ronnie O'Sullivan	(Republic of Ireland) Ken Doherty	10–1	
23 Jan	27 Jan	WAL	Welsh Open	Cardiff International Arena	Cardiff	(England) Paul Hunter	(Republic of Ireland) Ken Doherty	9–7	
3 Feb	10 Feb	ENG	Masters	Wembley Conference Centre	London	(England) Paul Hunter	(Wales) Mark Williams	10–9	
24 Feb	3 Mar	CHN	China Open	International Gymnastics Centre	Shanghai	(Wales) Mark Williams	(England) Anthony Hamilton	9–8	
4 Mar	10 Mar	THA	Thailand Masters	Merchant Court Hotel	Bangkok	(Wales) Mark Williams	(England) Stephen Lee	9–4	
19 Mar	24 Mar	IRL	Irish Masters	Citywest Hotel	Dublin	(Scotland) John Higgins	(England) Peter Ebdon	10–3	
6 Apr	14 Apr	SCO	Scottish Open	A.E.C.C.	Aberdeen	(England) Stephen Lee	(England) David Gray	9–2	
20 Apr	6 May	ENG	World Snooker Championship	Crucible Theatre	Sheffield	(England) Peter Ebdon	(Scotland) Stephen Hendry	18–17	
5 Jan	12 May	SCO	Premier League	Rothes Halls	Glenrothes	(England) Ronnie O'Sullivan	(Scotland) John Higgins	9–4	

Ranking event
Non-ranking event

=== Challenge Tour ===
Start	Finish	Country	Tournament name	Venue	City	Winner	Runner-up	Score	Ref.
8 Oct	14 Oct	ENG	Challenge Tour 1	Manhattan Club and Snooker Centre	Harrogate	(Wales) James Reynolds	(England) Steve Judd	6–5	
3 Dec	9 Dec	ENG	Challenge Tour 2	Jesters Snooker Club	Swindon	(Republic of Ireland) Leo Fernandez	(Wales) Ryan Day	6–3	
7 Jan	13 Jan	ENG	Challenge Tour 3	Manhattan Club and Snooker Centre	Harrogate	(England) Lee Spick	(Republic of Ireland) Joe Delaney	6–3	
4 Mar	10 Mar	ENG	Challenge Tour 4	Jesters Snooker Club	Swindon	(England) David Gilbert	(Wales) Ryan Day	6–3	

=== Other events ===
Start	Finish	Country	Tournament name	Venue	City	Winner	Runner-up	Score	Ref.
22 Aug	26 Aug	JPN	World Games	Selion Plaza	Akita	(Belgium) Bjorn Haneveer	(Philippines) Marlon Manalo	4–3	
31 Oct	4 Nov	AUT	Austrian Open	Snooker Cafe Pot Black	Wels	(Netherlands) Stefan Mazrocis	(England) Lee Richardson	5–3	
31 Oct	4 Nov	AUT	Austrian Open	Casino Linz	Linz	(Netherlands) Stefan Mazrocis	(England) Lee Richardson	5–3	

== Official rankings ==
The top 16 of the world rankings, these players automatically played in the final rounds of the world ranking events and were invited for the Masters.

No.	Ch.	Player	Points 1999/00	Points 2000/01	Total
1	Steady	(Wales) Mark Williams	31655	21735	53390
2	▲	(England) Ronnie O'Sullivan	20200	25399	45599
3	▼	(Scotland) John Higgins	21690	22034	43724
4	▲	(Republic of Ireland) Ken Doherty	16260	22079	38339
5	▼	(Scotland) Stephen Hendry	18125	17478	35603
6	Steady	(Wales) Matthew Stevens	18005	14879	32884
7	▲	(England) Peter Ebdon	11885	20777	32662
8	▼	(England) Stephen Lee	15980	13944	29924
9	▲	(England) Paul Hunter	10075	15809	25884
10	▲	(Northern Ireland) Joe Swail	12755	12117	24872
11	▲	(England) Jimmy White	11575	12009	23584
12	▼	(Scotland) Alan McManus	9750	12190	21940
13	▲	(England) Mark King	9980	11895	21875
14	▲	(Scotland) Graeme Dott	10367	11397	21764
15	▼	(England) Dave Harold	11852	9578	21430
16	▼	(Republic of Ireland) Fergal O'Brien	11035	10096	21131
