= Joe Delaney (snooker player) =

Irish snooker player (born 1972)

Personal information
- Born: 4 August 1972 (age 54)

Sport
- Country: Ireland
- Sport: Snooker
- Professional: 1991–2001, 2003–2011
- Highest ranking: 58 (2007/2008)
- Best ranking finish: Last 32 (x2)

Joseph Delaney (born 4 August 1972 in Dublin, Ireland), better known as Joe Delaney, is an Irish former professional snooker player.

== Career ==
Born in 1972, Delaney turned professional in 1991. He endured several barren seasons on the tour before losing his place in 1997, but re-qualified during the 1997/1998 season, notably reaching the last 48 stage of the 1998 World Championship. There, he beat seven opponents, including Michael Holt, Munraj Pal, Jamie Burnett and Gary Ponting, before losing 7–10 to Dave Harold.

In his first season back on the tour, Delaney won the majority of his matches, but progressed only to the last 96 at a ranking event – the 1998 Grand Prix, where the declining Steve James beat him 5–2.

Having competed for another several seasons as an amateur, Delaney reached the final of a Challenge Tour event in 2003, defeating Paul McPhillips and Joe Jogia alongside five others, before losing 3–6 to Lee Spick. This performance was not enough for him to re-qualify, but the following season heralded runs to the last 16 at another Challenge Tour event – losing 1–5 to Cypriot Mehmet Husnu – and the fifth qualifying round at the 2003 World Championship, where Gary Hardiman beat him 5–3. These results did earn Delaney a place on the main tour for the 2003/2004 season.

The following three seasons were without any significant progress, but Delaney enjoyed better form in 2006/2007. He reached the last 48 at the 2006 UK Championship, defeating Andrew Higginson 9–5 and fellow Irishman Fergal O'Brien 9–7 before losing to Northern Ireland's Joe Swail, also 9–7. The 2007 Welsh Open, in which Higginson would reach the final as an amateur, heralded a 5–3 victory over Spick and a 5–4 defeat of Marcus Campbell, but Delaney lost in the last 48, 0–5 to Stuart Bingham.

Earlier in the season, he had played in the 2006 Irish Professional Championship, beating fifty-seven-year-old Alex Higgins 5–2 before losing in the quarter-finals to a resurgent Ken Doherty; the former would be Higgins's penultimate competitive match.

At the 2007 World Championship, Delaney defeated Ian Preece 10–7, having trailed 1–5, Barry Pinches 10–9 from 6–9 behind, and Alan McManus by the same scoreline to reach the main stages at the Crucible Theatre for the first time in his career. In his last-32 match against Matthew Stevens, Delaney came to trail 0–5, and eventually lost 2–10.

At the 2007 Grand Prix, Delaney progressed from his qualifying group – recording victories over Issara Kachaiwong, David Gilbert, David Gray, 4–0 over Pinches and a 4–3 defeat of Spick – but lost all five of his group matches.

The 2008/2009 season saw Delaney reach the last 64 in four tournaments – beating Spick 5–0 in the Northern Ireland Trophy after Spick had conceded having fallen ill, and again in the Welsh Open, 5–3, before a 1–5 defeat to Gerard Greene in the latter. At that season's World Championship, he lost 1–10 to Judd Trump.

By the end of the 2009/2010 season, Delaney's form had slipped, although he recorded a 10–0 whitewash over Sam Baird in qualifying for the 2010 World Championship; in his next match, he recovered from 0–8 down against Adrian Gunnell to trail only 7–9, leading the seventeenth frame by fifty-six points before Gunnell made a break of 64 to prevail 10–7.

With the introduction of Players Tour Championship events in 2010, Delaney played in fourteen tournaments that season, notably beating Patrick Einsle, Rory McLeod, Greene and Li Yan before exiting at the last-32 stage at the 2010 Shanghai Masters, 3–5 to Mark King.

2010/2011 brought no more success, however, and Delaney finished his season with a 4–10 World Championship qualifying defeat to Jogia. Ranked 81st at its conclusion, he dropped off the tour once more, aged 38.

As an amateur, he came within one win of returning to the tour in 2012 in one of the Q-School events, but lost his quarter-final match 0–4 to Rod Lawler.

== Personal life ==
Alongside his father and brother, Delaney runs a furniture business which makes seating for restaurants, nightclubs and cinemas.

== Performance and rankings timeline ==
| Tournament | 1991/ 92 | 1992/ 93 | 1993/ 94 | 1994/ 95 | 1995/ 96 | 1996/ 97 | 1997/ 98 | 1998/ 99 | 1999/ 00 | 2000/ 01 | 2001/ 02 | 2002/ 03 | 2003/ 04 | 2004/ 05 | 2005/ 06 | 2006/ 07 | 2007/ 08 | 2008/ 09 | 2009/ 10 | 2010/ 11 | 2011/ 12 | 2012/ 13 | 2013/ 14 |
|---|---|---|---|---|---|---|---|---|---|---|---|---|---|---|---|---|---|---|---|---|---|---|---|
| Ranking (Note: It shows the ranking at the beginning of the season) | (Note: New players on the Main Tour don't have a ranking) | 137 | 181 | 186 | 166 | 148 | 137 | 109 | 131 | 141 | (Note: He was an amateur) | | | 79 | 73 | 63 | 58 | 61 | 63 | 61 | | | |
Ranking tournaments
| Shanghai Masters | Tournament Not Held | | | | | | | | | | | | | | | | LQ | LQ | LQ | 1R | A | A | A |
| UK Championship | 1R | LQ | LQ | LQ | LQ | LQ | A | LQ | A | LQ | A | A | 1R | LQ | LQ | 1R | LQ | LQ | LQ | LQ | A | A | A |
| German Masters (Note: The event was called the German Open (1995/1996–1997/1998)) | Tournament Not Held | | | | LQ | LQ | A | NR | Tournament Not Held | | | | | | | | | | | LQ | A | A | A |
| Welsh Open | LQ | LQ | 1R | LQ | LQ | LQ | A | LQ | A | LQ | A | A | LQ | LQ | LQ | 1R | 1R | LQ | LQ | LQ | A | A | A |
| World Open (Note: The event was called the Grand Prix (1991/1992–2000/2001 and 2004/2005–2009/2010) and the LG Cup (2001/2002–2003/2004)) | LQ | LQ | LQ | LQ | LQ | LQ | A | LQ | A | LQ | A | A | LQ | LQ | LQ | LQ | RR | LQ | LQ | LQ | A | A | A |
| Players Championship Grand Final | Tournament Not Held | | | | | | | | | | | | | | | | | | | DNQ | DNQ | DNQ | DNQ |
| China Open (Note: The event was called the China International (1997/1998–1998/1999)) | Tournament Not Held | | | | | | NR | LQ | A | LQ | A | Not Held | | LQ | LQ | LQ | LQ | LQ | LQ | LQ | A | A | A |
| World Championship | LQ | LQ | LQ | LQ | LQ | LQ | LQ | LQ | LQ | LQ | LQ | LQ | LQ | LQ | LQ | 1R | LQ | LQ | LQ | LQ | LQ | A | A |
Non-ranking tournaments
| The Masters | A | LQ | LQ | A | A | A | WD | WD | A | A | A | A | A | A | A | A | LQ | A | A | A | A | A | A |
Former ranking tournaments
| Classic | LQ | Tournament Not Held | | | | | | | | | | | | | | | | | | | | | |
| Strachan Open (Note: The event was called the Strachan Challenge (1992/1993–1993/1994)) | LQ | MR | NR | Tournament Not Held | | | | | | | | | | | | | | | | | | | |
| Asian Classic (Note: The event was called the Dubai Classic (1991/1992-1994/1995) and the Thailand Classic (1995/1996)) | LQ | LQ | LQ | LQ | LQ | LQ | Tournament Not Held | | | | | | | | | | | | | | | | |
| Thailand Masters (Note: The event was called the Asian Open (1991/1992–1992/1993) and the Thailand Open (1993/1994–1996/1997)) | WD | LQ | LQ | LQ | LQ | LQ | A | LQ | A | LQ | A | NR | Not Held | | | NR | Tournament Not Held | | | | | | |
| Scottish Open (Note: The event was called the International Open (1992/1993–1996/1997) and the Players Championship (2003/2004)) | NH | LQ | LQ | LQ | LQ | LQ | A | LQ | A | LQ | A | A | LQ | Tournament Not Held | | | | | | | | MR | NH |
| British Open | LQ | LQ | LQ | LQ | LQ | LQ | A | LQ | A | LQ | A | A | LQ | LQ | Tournament Not Held | | | | | | | | |
| Irish Masters | Non-Ranking Event | | | | | | | | | | | A | LQ | LQ | NH | NR | Tournament Not Held | | | | | | |
| Malta Cup (Note: The event was called the European Open (1991/1992–1996/1997 and 2001/2002–2003/2004) and the Irish Open (1998/1999)) | LQ | LQ | LQ | LQ | LQ | LQ | NH | LQ | Not Held | | A | A | LQ | LQ | LQ | LQ | NR | Tournament Not Held | | | | | |
| Northern Ireland Trophy | Tournament Not Held | | | | | | | | | | | | | | NR | LQ | LQ | LQ | Tournament Not Held | | | | |
| Bahrain Championship | Tournament Not Held | | | | | | | | | | | | | | | | | LQ | Tournament Not Held | | | | |
Former non-ranking tournaments
| Strachan Challenge | R | MR | WD | Tournament Not Held | | | | | | | | | | | | | | | | | | | |
| Irish Professional Championship | LQ | 1R | Tournament Not Held | | | | | | | | | | | | QF | QF | SF | Tournament Not Held | | | | | |

Performance Table Legend
| LQ | lost in the qualifying draw | #R | lost in the early rounds of the tournament (WR = Wildcard round, RR = Round robin) | QF | lost in the quarter-finals |
| SF | lost in the semi-finals | F | lost in the final | W | won the tournament |
| DNQ | did not qualify for the tournament | A | did not participate in the tournament | WD | withdrew from the tournament |
| DQ | disqualified from the tournament | | | | |

| NH / Not Held | event was not held. |
| NR / Non-Ranking Event | event is/was no longer a ranking event. |
| R / Ranking Event | event is/was a ranking event. |
| MR / Minor-Ranking Event | event is/was a minor-ranking event. |

== Career finals ==
=== Non-ranking finals: 1 ===
| Outcome | No. | Year | Championship | Opponent in the final | Score |
|---|---|---|---|---|---|
| Runner-up | 1. | 2002 | Challenge Tour – Event 3 | (England) Lee Spick | 3–6 |
