= 2010 World Snooker Championship =

Professional snooker tournament

2010 Betfred.com World Snooker Championship
Tournament information
- Dates: 17 April – 3 May 2010
- Venue: Crucible Theatre
- City: Sheffield
- Country: England
- Organisation: WPBSA
- Format: Ranking event
- Total prize fund: £1,111,000
- Winner's share: £250,000
- Highest break: Graeme Dott (SCO) (146); Mark Allen (NIR) (146)

Final
- Champion: Neil Robertson (AUS)
- Runner-up: Graeme Dott (SCO)
- Score: 18–13

The 2010 World Snooker Championship (officially the 2010 Betfred.com World Snooker Championship) was a professional snooker tournament that took place between 17 April and 3 May 2010 at the Crucible Theatre in Sheffield, England. The final ranking event of the 2009–10 snooker season, it was the 34th year that the World Snooker Championship had been held at the Crucible. The event was organised by the World Professional Billiards and Snooker Association and had a total prize fund of £1,111,000, with £250,000 going to the winner of the event. The tournament was sponsored by sports betting company Betfred.

John Higgins was the defending champion, but lost in the second round 11–13 to Steve Davis. Neil Robertson won the event after a 18–13 win over Graeme Dott in the final. In winning the event, Robertson was the second player from outside of the British Isles to win the event in the modern era of snooker, and the first Australian to win the event since the disputed 1952 World Snooker Championship which contained only Australian and New Zealand players. There were 60 century breaks made during the event, the highest being a 146 made by both Dott and Mark Allen.

== Background ==
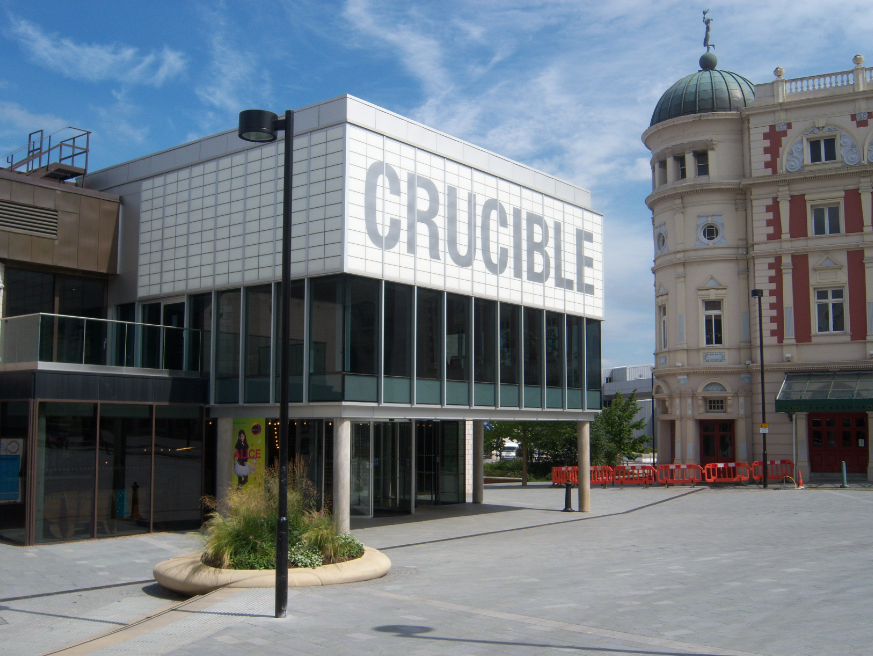
For the 34th consecutive year, the main stage of the tournament was held at the Crucible Theatre (pictured) in Sheffield, England.

The inaugural 1927 World Snooker Championship, then known as the Professional Championship of Snooker, took place at various venues in England between November 1926 and May 1927. Joe Davis won the final—held at Camkin's Hall in Birmingham from 9 to 12 May 1927—and went on to win the tournament 15 consecutive times before retiring undefeated after the 1946 edition (no tournaments were held from 1941 to 1945 because of World War II). The tournament went into abeyance after only two players contested the 1952 edition, due to a dispute between the Professional Billiards Players' Association (PBPA) and the Billiards Association and Control Council (BACC). The PBPA established an alternative tournament, the World Professional Match-play Championship, of which the six editions held between 1952 and 1957 are retroactively regarded as legitimate continuations of the World Snooker Championship. However, due to waning public interest in snooker during the post-war era, that tournament was also discontinued, and the world title was uncontested between 1958 and 1963.

Then-professional player Rex Williams was instrumental in reviving the World Snooker Championship on a challenge basis in 1964. John Pulman, winner of the 1957 World Professional Match-play Championship, defended the world title across seven challenge matches between 1964 and 1968. The World Snooker Championship reverted to an annual knockout tournament for the 1969 edition, marking the beginning of the championship's "modern era". The 1977 edition was the first staged at the Crucible Theatre in Sheffield, where it has remained since. The most successful players in the modern era was Stephen Hendry, having won the title seven times. Hendry was also the tournament's youngest winner, having captured his first title at the 1990 event, aged 21 years and 106 days. Ray Reardon became the oldest winner when he secured his sixth title at the 1978 event, aged 45 years and 203 days.

The 2010 event was organised by the World Professional Billiards and Snooker Association. John Higgins was the defending champion, having defeated Shaun Murphy 18–9 in the previous year's final. The event was sponsored by sports betting company Betfred, who extended their sponsorship of the event for a further four years.

=== Format ===
The 2010 World Snooker Championship took place from 17 April to 3 May 2010 in Sheffield, England. The tournament was the last of six ranking events in the 2009–10 snooker season on the World Snooker Tour. It featured a 32-player main draw that was held at the Crucible Theatre, as well as a qualifying draw that was played at the World Snooker Academy in Sheffield from 26 February to 9 March. This was the 34th consecutive year that the tournament had been staged at the Crucible. The main stages of the event were broadcast by the BBC in the United Kingdom.

The top 16 players in the latest world rankings automatically qualified for the main draw as seeded players. (Note: In the event of the defending champion being ranked outside the top 16, he would replace the player ranked world number 16 as an automatic qualifier.) Higgins was seeded first overall as the defending champion, and the remaining 15 seeds were allocated based on the latest world rankings. The number of frames required to win a match increased throughout the tournament. The first round consisted of best-of-19-frames matches, with the final match being played over a maximum of 35 frames. All 16 non-seeded spots in the main draw were filled with players from the qualifying rounds. The draw for the televised stage of the World Championship was made on 11 March 2010.

=== Prize fund ===
The breakdown of prize money for the event is shown below:

- Winner: £250,000
- Runner-up: £125,000
- Semi-final: £52,000
- Quarter-final: £24,050
- Last 16: £16,000
- Last 32: £12,000
- Last 48: £8,200
- Last 64: £4,600
- Stage one highest break: £1,000
- Stage two highest break: £10,000
- Stage one maximum break: £5,000
- Stage two maximum break: £147,000
- Total: £1,111,000

== Summary ==
=== First round ===
The first round was played between 17 and 22 April as the best of 19 frames held over two sessions. The defending champion, John Higgins, trailed Barry Hawkins 4‍–‍5 at the end of the first session, but he went on to secure his progress into the second round with breaks of 63, 121, 67 and 114 for a 10‍–‍6 victory. "I was a total bag of nerves early on. I knew it was going to happen because that's how I felt on the two previous occasions I've come back here as the champion," Higgins said afterwards. There were two debutants at the Crucible on this edition: Tom Ford and Zhang Anda. Ford faced Mark Allen, who took the first seven frames before Ford replied with a 107 break. Allen then almost completed a maximum break in the ninth frame: he potted fifteen red balls with fifteen blacks, but he lost position on the yellow and, even though he potted it, he then missed the following green to end the break on 122. Allen, who would have earned £157,000 for the 147, went on to secure a 10‍–‍4 win. An 18-year-old Zhang met Stephen Hendry, who built a 4‍–‍0 lead at the start of the match. Hendry's lead was halved at 7‍–‍5 and then Zhang won four on the trot to go within one of victory at 9‍–‍7. Zhang had a chance to claim victory, but he missed a black off its spot when he was on a 25 break and Hendry won two consecutive frames to force a decider, which he won. "At 9‍–‍7 I was preparing my retirement speech," Hendry commented. Mark Selby, winner of the 2010 Masters during the season, built a one-frame lead against Ken Doherty with breaks of 103 and 106. He then went on to win 10‍–‍4, recording an 81 break in the last frame as part of a failed maximum attempt. Selby said he was "chuffed to bits" after progressing into the second round with his defeat of Doherty, world champion in 1997.

Four of the sixteen seeded players lost their first-round matches: Marco Fu, Mark King, Peter Ebdon and Ryan Day. Martin Gould trailed Fu 6‍–‍8 despite recording two centuries, but he forced a decider and took it with a 90 break. King met six-time world champion Steve Davis, who was 52 years old and was playing at the Crucible for a record-extending 30th time. Steve Davis won four frames in a row to go 8‍–‍6 ahead and clinched victory in the decider. He became the oldest player since Eddie Charlton in 1989 to win a match in the final stage of the World Championship. "What a feeling. The last frame was torture. It was good to actually win a match here at the Crucible after a few dismal performances here over the past few years, and hold myself together," Steve Davis said. Ebdon, the 2002 champion, faced Graeme Dott, who had defeated him in the 2006 final. Dott won 10‍–‍5, leaving Ebdon out of the top 16 for the following season for the first time since 1994. Day, who had made it to the quarter-finals both in 2008 and 2009, faced Mark Davis. Mark Davis ended the first session ahead at 5‍–‍4 and won the second by the same score to seal a 10‍–‍8 victory. "I have to evaluate on a poor season. There weren't that many events and I didn't really get into any rhythm," Day said.

Joe Perry won over Michael Holt 10‍–‍4. Mark Williams, world champion both in 2000 and 2003 and winner of the 2010 China Open during the season, beat Marcus Campbell 10‍–‍5. "It was a struggle. I'm over the moon with the result but not the performance. The first round is a twitchy one," Williams admitted after the win. Ali Carter, a runner-up in 2008, defeated Jamie Cope 10‍–‍9. "I'm going to see a sports psychologist in the summer. I think it's the only thing that's going to make any difference," Cope said afterwards. Ronnie O'Sullivan made century breaks of 100 and 108 in consecutive frames to lead Liang Wenbo 7‍–‍2 and 9‍–‍3, only one away from victory, but Liang compiled breaks of 61, 103 and 127 to win four frames on the trot and reduce the deficit. O'Sullivan then claimed victory with a 10‍–‍7 result aided by a 73 break.

Neil Robertson, winner of the 2009 Grand Prix during the season, built a 5‍–‍1 lead against Fergal O'Brien and got a fluke to conclude the first session 6‍–‍3 ahead. Robertson went on to win 10‍–‍5. The match featured a frame that lasted 69 minutes, with the players taking 20 minutes to pot the yellow when only the colours remained on the table. "I felt like I was trying to get chewing gum off a carpet. [Fergal O'Brien]'s very measured, he's got tons of experience and he's not the kind of player to hand you chances on a plate. It wasn't slow play. The safety was really good," Robertson said. Before the tournament began, Ding Junhui was deemed by Clive Everton, writing for The Guardian, as an "authentic title contender", after he had played three ranking finals during the season and won the 2009 UK Championship. Ding went 8‍–‍1 in front of Stuart Pettman with breaks of 77, 88, 120 and 95. Ding took two more frames to win 10‍–‍1. The 2005 world champion, Shaun Murphy, built a 8‍–‍1 lead against Gerard Greene. Greene reduced the deficit from 2‍–‍9 to 7‍–‍9, making breaks of 67, 65 and 92 in the process. In the fourteenth frame, when only the pink and black balls were left on the table, Murphy managed to lay snookers, get 30 points in penalties and take the frame on the pink. Murphy won 10‍–‍7. Stephen Lee constructed a 127 break in the first session of his match against Stephen Maguire, but he ended it 3‍–‍6 behind. Maguire, world number two and a semi-finalist at the Crucible in 2007, secured victory with a 10‍–‍4 result. "I think I've under-achieved in my career so far, but I'm trying different things to try to win more tournaments," Maguire stated.

=== Second round ===
The second round of the event was played as the best of 25 frames, held over three sessions, between 22 and 26 April. Steve Davis compiled breaks of 53, 48, 72, 102 and 53 as he took an early advantage of 6‍–‍2 against Higgins. Going into the last session, Steve Davis led 9‍–‍7, with Higgins making a series of mistakes. Higgins had a chance to level the scores at 12-all and force a decider, but he missed a pot. With only four colours remaining on the table, Steve Davis potted the brown with a double and later on secured victory with blue and pink. "Obviously winning the event is massive but in terms of individual performances and pride of performance it's got to be so much up there," Steve Davis said. He ranked the victory as almost the best of his career, only second to his triumph over O'Sullivan in the final of the 1997 Masters. At 52, he became the oldest player to reach the quarter-finals of the World Championship since Eddie Charlton in 1983. Days later, ahead of the start of the final of the tournament, it was announced that Higgins had been suspended by the World Professional Billiards and Snooker Association following a News of the World story alleging that he had agreed to lose frames in future tournaments in return for £261,000. Mark Davis was playing in the second round of the World Championship only for the second time: he had succumbed to Ebdon in 1995. He faced Allen, who potted six reds en route to a maximum break in the sixth frame. He lost position and had to play the pink instead of the black, which allowed him to record the first 146 break in the history of the Crucible. Allen won the match 13‍–‍5 with further century breaks of 132 and 101.

Dott compiled breaks of 94, 110 and 99 as he took a six-frame lead against Maguire at 7‍–‍1. Dott made further breaks of 130 and 127 the next day to extend the lead to 11‍–‍1. Maguire took five of the following six frames, but Dott produced a 49 break to win 13‍–‍6. "If I get to the semi-finals, I am back in the top 16, but I would rather win the title," Dott said afterwards. Robertson trailed Gould 0‍–‍6 during the first session and 5‍–‍11 overnight, but he won five frames on the trot at the resumption the following day to reduce the deficit to only one. Robertson produced breaks of 64 and 112 as he forced a deciding frame. Dott was in first in the decider with a 40 break, but Robertson stole the frame with a 52 of his own and claimed victory. "To do that, with the Crucible to yourself, is one of the best feelings of my career," Robertson said, and he claimed that he had taken inspiration from Murphy's comeback from 7‍–‍12 behind against Matthew Stevens in the quarter-finals of the 2007 edition. "The wheels came off at 150mph into a brick wall. I really don't know what happened," Gould lamented.

Perry recovered from 6‍–‍10 down against Carter to go 11‍–‍10 in front. Carter then compiled breaks of 104 and 82 and wrapped up victory in the next frame with a 13‍–‍11 result. "Wanting to win so badly makes you lose. You get in your own way. It's only when you get older that you realise that," Carter said. O'Sullivan and Williams were levelled at 8-all at the end of the second session. From 9‍–‍9, O'Sullivan took a two-frame lead with breaks of 104 and 75 and, although Williams replied with a 115, O'Sullivan produced two more century breaks to advance into the quarter-finals. "I had to give every shot thought and something clicked. I've thrown two or three world titles away so I can't afford to get too confident," O'Sullivan said. "I don't think there's a player in the game who can make snooker look so easy. You've got to take your hat off to him," Williams acknowledged.

Hendry led Selby 4‍–‍2 and was 75 points in front in the sixth frame, but Selby stole it after laying two snookers and taking advantage of a free ball. Selby then produced breaks of 96, 117 and 99 on his way to a 13‍–‍5 victory. "When you've been used to success it's hard to take a performance like that," Hendry lamented. Murphy was two frames behind on four occasions, but he managed to level every time against Ding. Ding then went 10‍–‍9 ahead aided by a 137 break, but Murphy won three frames on the trot and ended the match with a total clearance of 128 points.

=== Quarter-finals ===
The quarter-finals of the event were played as the best of 25 frames, held over three sessions, between 27 and 28 April. Steve Davis reached the quarter-finals of the World Championship for the first time since 2005 and was received with a standing ovation ahead of his meeting with Robertson. The opening frame of the match, in which Davis's pace was regarded by Clive Everton as "funereal", lasted half an hour. Robertson took a 7‍–‍1 lead at the end of the first session, with Davis only able to produce a highest break of 29. In the second, Davis made a 128 break, but Robertson had the chance to win the match. However, he missed match ball, which would have secured him a 13‍–‍2 victory with a session to spare, and allowed Davis to take two frames and trail 4‍–‍12. Robertson sealed victory the following day with a 13‍–‍5 result. "I feel 10 years younger. I've had such great receptions from the crowd, I've thoroughly enjoyed myself and I didn't want it to stop. I've climbed a mountain to reach the quarter-final," Davis said afterwards.

O'Sullivan faced Selby, who had defeated him in the decider of the Masters during the season. In the opening frame, which lasted 42 minutes, O'Sullivan got a snooker that allowed him to extract 24 penalty points from his opponent. Selby produced breaks of 84 and 45 to go 2‍–‍1 in front, but O'Sullivan, who was not punished for his mistakes, took the lead again in the fifth. Selby took the seventh frame on the final black ball and O'Sullivan ended the first session with an 81 break for a 4‍–‍4. Runs of 92, 89, 86, 117 and 52 allowed Selby to win five of the six frames played in the afternoon and raced to a 9‍–‍5 lead. O'Sullivan managed to edge closer at 7‍–‍9 and 9‍–‍11, but Selby clinched victory with a 13‍–‍11 result. "For the majority of the match I didn't score but I managed to revert to plan B and grind out frames. Sometimes it's not all about big breaks," Selby commented after the match. "I can't keep coming here moaning and trying to understand what's going on in my little world. I haven't felt fully comfortable or confident for 17 or 18 years," O'Sullivan lamented.

Allen, a semi-finalist in the previous edition, won the first four frames of the duel with Dott. Dott then won three on the trot, but Allen replied with a century break to go 5‍–‍3 in front. Allen's lead remained the same at 7‍–‍5, but Dott went on to produce breaks of 116, 85 and 67 to take the lead at 8‍–‍7. The second session ended at 8‍–‍8 thanks to a 67 break by Allen. Dott fell two frames behind at 10‍–‍12, with Allen only one away from victory with three more to play. Dott recovered and won three on the spin to seal victory. "Graeme [Dott] played three perfect frames to win," Allen admitted. "I didn't think my safety was good enough to cope with Mark's long potting. The only thing wrong with how I'm playing is that I'm just a bit careless," Dott said.

Murphy, who met Carter, was playing in the quarter-finals of the World Championship for a fifth time in six years. He led 5‍–‍3 after the first day. Murphy opened a four-frame gap at 8‍–‍4, but Carter recovered with breaks of 87, 73 and 64 and levelled the match again. Carter recorded a 122 break to go ahead at the resumption, but Murphy was in front at 12‍–‍11. Carter then forced a decider with a break of 59. In the decider, Murphy was in first with a 40 break, but he missed a pink ball and allowed Carter to clear the colours and win 13‍–‍12.

=== Semi-finals ===
The semi-finals of the event were played as the best of 25 frames, held over four sessions, between 29 April and 1 May. Robertson faced Carter, who had had a late finish in the semi-final. Clive Everton wrote that Carter had needed a "prodigious mental effort" to win the decider against Murphy in the quarter-finals. A break of 91 allowed Robertson to take a 2‍–‍0 lead, which was increased when he won the third frame after needing the snooker. A 124 break followed as Robertson went 5‍–‍0 in front. Carter secured his first frame in the sixth, but Robertson replied with the following one. Carter compiled breaks of 38 and 69 to end the first day of play with a four-frame deficit. After the resumption, Robertson produced a 140 break and he also won the following one potting a re-spotted black to edge 8‍–‍2 in front. Carter then replied with breaks of 76 and 81 to halve the deficit, but Robertson recovered with runs of 59 and 104 for a 10‍–‍6 at the end of the session. The match resumed with the players each winning one frame. Robertson then fluked position on a black and he went on to clear the table with a 116 break. Aided by breaks of 78, 31 and 51, Robertson extended his lead to a seven-frame cushion at 14‍–‍7. Although Carter won two frames on the trot, he then went in-off the green ball in the following one, the last of the session, and Robertson took it, now only two away from victory with nine to play. Resuming at 15‍–‍9 for the final session, Carter won two consecutive frames and also had a chance in the following one thanks to a fluke on a red, but Robertson got in and moved within one of victory. Carter edged closer at 12‍–‍16, but Robertson won the match 17‍–‍12. "This is a proud moment because I'm representing my country. This will do a lot for snooker there and I hope that what I've done pleases them down under," Robertson said. Robertson became the first player from outside the United Kingdom and Ireland to reach the final of the World Championship since Cliff Thorburn in 1983 and the first finalist from Australia since Eddie Charlton in 1975. "After losing the second frame to go 2-0 down my head totally went. I could have smashed the place up—I was that angry—but I was feeling very tired," Carter admitted.

In his meeting with Selby, Dott won the first frame with a break of 79, but he missed a green ball when he was on a 53 break in the second and he allowed Selby to steal it. Further breaks of 70, 50 and 93 powered Dott into a 5‍–‍2 lead. The last frame of the first session saw Selby manufacture a 142 break to reduce the deficit. At the resumption, as Dott went three in front once again, he produced a 146 break, tying Allen's second-round 146 as the highest break of the tournament. In the fifteenth frame, Selby made a break of 51 before he missed a red ball into a middle pocket, which allowed Dott to take a 9‍–‍6 advantage. He followed with a run of 86 in the last of the session to end four ahead. Selby reduced the deficit to only one in the third session, but Dott replied with three on the spin to lead 14‍–‍10, three away from victory. In the last session, Selby made breaks of 79 and 83 as he won the first three frames. After a passage of play that was monopolized by safety play, Dott replied with a 67 break. Dott went on to win 17‍–‍14. "I feel relieved more than anything. I had loads of doubts. I have the utmost respect for Mark and I was really struggling with my rhythm," Dott said. Apart from the semi-finals, he considered he was playing better than in 2006, when he had lifted the trophy. "Every time I made a mistake he punished me—he probably deserved to win," Selby lamented.

=== Final ===
The final was played as a best-of-35-frames, held over four sessions, on 2 and 3 May, between Robertson and Dott. Robertson was contesting his first World Championship final, while Dott had been a runner-up to O'Sullivan in 2004 and had won in 2006 against Ebdon. It marked the first sime since 2003 that no English player appeared in the final. Referee Eirian Williams officiated the match, the fourth time he was in charge of a world final after 2001, 2005 and 2007. Dott began the final with a break of 80 and led 3‍–‍1. Robertson completed two consecutive clearances to take the fifth and sixth frames on the final black ball and level at 3‍–‍3. Dott won back-to-back frames to go 5‍–‍3 ahead at the conclusion of the first session. In the second, Robertson compiled breaks of 61 and 90 to win two frames in half-an-hour. He then laid a snooker he needed to tie the eleventh frame and won it on the re-spotted black to lead Dott 6‍–‍5. Robertson also stole the following frame with a run of 79 and won another one for a 8‍–‍5 advantage. Dott, who had lost five frames on the bounce, won back-to-back frames, but Robertson took the last of the day for a 9‍–‍7 lead after two sessions.

On the next day, Robertson manufactured breaks of 79 and 82 to edge 11‍–‍8 in front. It was taking both players longer than usual to play each shot. "Since both players were engaged in the most important match of their lives, it was not surprising that extra care and more thought than usual was devoted to many shots," Clive Everton wrote in his report. Dott won the twentieth frame and Robertson replied with the following one. A century break of 112 in the last of the afternoon allowed Robertson to end the session ahead, at 12‍–‍10. Dott halved the deficit with a 57 break and was also only one behind at 12‍–‍13. Robertson made two breaks of 55 and another one of 53 as he went on to win 18‍–‍13 and claim a maiden world title. The final session featured frames that lasted 44 and 47 minutes, which were regarded by The Guardian as bordering on the "tedious". The final ended at 12:54 a.m., exactly as late as the 2007 final, which held the record for the latest finish. "It was a scrappy game. I don't think anyone could say we tried to play negatively, we were both trying to perform," Dott said.

Robertson became the first Australian to win the title in the modern era and only the second ever after Horace Lindrum, who won the controversial 1952 championship. He also became the first player from outside the United Kingdom and Ireland to win the title since Canada's Cliff Thorburn in 1980 and the first non-British player to win the title since Ireland's Ken Doherty in 1997. Robertson hoped his win would help lift the low profile of snooker in his home country. "It would have been a big blow if I had lost in the final. I had all that pressure to contend with but hopefully this is the start of something and we can have an event there now," Robertson said.

== Main draw ==
Shown below are the results for each round. The numbers in parentheses beside some of the players are their seeding ranks (each championship has 16 seeds and 16 qualifiers).

First round Best of 19 frames
17 April
(Scotland) John Higgins (1)	10
(England) Barry Hawkins	6
19 & 20 April
(England) Mark King (16)	9
(England) Steve Davis	10
20 & 21 April
(Australia) Neil Robertson (9)	10
(Republic of Ireland) Fergal O'Brien	5
18 & 19 April
(Hong Kong) Marco Fu (8)	9
(England) Martin Gould	10
18 & 19 April
(England) Ali Carter (5)	10
(England) Jamie Cope	4
17 & 18 April
(England) Joe Perry (12)	10
(England) Michael Holt	4
20 & 21 April
(China) Ding Junhui (13)	10
(England) Stuart Pettman	1
21 & 22 April
(England) Shaun Murphy (4)	10
(Northern Ireland) Gerard Greene	7
21 & 22 April
(Scotland) Stephen Maguire (3)	10
(England) Stephen Lee	4
20 & 21 April
(England) Peter Ebdon (14)	5
(Scotland) Graeme Dott	10
17 & 18 April
(Northern Ireland) Mark Allen (11)	10
(England) Tom Ford	4
20 & 21 April
(Wales) Ryan Day (6)	8
(England) Mark Davis	10
17 & 18 April
(England) Mark Selby (7)	10
(Republic of Ireland) Ken Doherty	4
17 & 18 April
(Scotland) Stephen Hendry (10)	10
(China) Zhang Anda	9
19 April
(Wales) Mark Williams (15)	10
(Scotland) Marcus Campbell	5
19 & 20 April
(England) Ronnie O'Sullivan (2)	10
(China) Liang Wenbo	7

Second round Best of 25 frames
22, 23 & 24 April
(Scotland) John Higgins (1)	11
(England) Steve Davis	13
23 & 24 April
(Australia) Neil Robertson (9)	13
(England) Martin Gould	12
24, 25 & 26 April
(England) Ali Carter (5)	13
(England) Joe Perry (12)	11
25 & 26 April
(China) Ding Junhui (13)	10
(England) Shaun Murphy (4)	13
23 & 24 April
(Scotland) Stephen Maguire (3)	6
(Scotland) Graeme Dott	13
22 & 23 April
(Northern Ireland) Mark Allen (11)	13
(England) Mark Davis	5
25 & 26 April
(England) Mark Selby (7)	13
(Scotland) Stephen Hendry (10)	5
24, 25 & 26 April
(Wales) Mark Williams (15)	10
(England) Ronnie O'Sullivan (2)	13

Quarter-finals; Best of 25 frames
27 & 28 April
(England) Steve Davis	5
(Australia) Neil Robertson (9)	13
27 & 28 April
(England) Ali Carter (5)	13
(England) Shaun Murphy (4)	12
27 & 28 April
(Scotland) Graeme Dott	13
(Northern Ireland) Mark Allen (11)	12
27 & 28 April
(England) Mark Selby (7)	13
(England) Ronnie O'Sullivan (2)	11

Semi-finals; Best of 33 frames
29, 30 April & 1 May
(Australia) Neil Robertson (9)	17
(England) Ali Carter (5)	12
29, 30 April & 1 May
(Scotland) Graeme Dott	17
(England) Mark Selby (7)	14

Final; Best of 35 frames
2 & 3 May
(Australia) Neil Robertson (9)	18
(Scotland) Graeme Dott	13

=== Final: frame scores ===
Final (Best of 35 frames) Crucible Theatre, Sheffield, 2 & 3 May 2010. Referee: Eirian Williams.
Neil Robertson (9)
Australia
18–13
Graeme Dott
Scotland
10–87, 65–55, 1–93, 35–62, 68–56, 62–56, 24–73, 47–74, 66–5, 90–6, 79–72, 79–53, 52–11, 4–71, 27–70, 113–23, 23–87, 69–56, 82–1, 31–66, 89–12, 2–116, 12–81, 116–13, 36–72, 69–15, 63–49, 53–78, 74–23, 58–10, 94–1
Century breaks: 1 (Dott 1)

Highest break by Robertson: 90
Highest break by Dott: 112

10–87, 65–55, 1–93, 35–62, 68–56, 62–56, 24–73, 47–74, 66–5, 90–6, 79–72, 79–53, 52–11, 4–71, 27–70, 113–23, 23–87, 69–56, 82–1, 31–66, 89–12, 2–116, 12–81, 116–13, 36–72, 69–15, 63–49, 53–78, 74–23, 58–10, 94–1
(Australia) Neil Robertson wins the 2010 Betfred.com World Snooker Championship

== Qualification ==
=== Preliminary qualifying ===
The preliminary qualifying rounds for the tournament took place on 26 February 2010 at the English Institute of Sport in Sheffield. (WPBSA members not on The Tour.)

Round 1

(England) Les Dodd	5–0	(England) Philip Minchin
(England) Paul Wykes	5–1	(England) David Taylor
(India) David Singh	5–2	(England) Colin Mitchell
(England) Ali Bassiri	1–5	(England) Neil Selman
(England) Barry West	w/o–w/d	(England) Christopher Flight
(England) Del Smith	5–2	(England) Phil Seaton
(England) Bill Oliver	1–5	(England) Nic Barrow
(England) Stephen Ormerod	5–4	(England) Paul Cavney

Round 2

(England) Les Dodd	2–5	(England) Paul Wykes
(India) David Singh	5–3	(England) Neil Selman
(England) Barry West	1–5	(England) Del Smith
(England) Nic Barrow	5–0	(England) Stephen Ormerod

=== Qualifying ===
The first four qualifying rounds for the tournament took place between 27 February and 5 March at the English Institute of Sport in Sheffield. The final round took place between 7 and 9 March at the same venue.

Round 1

(Thailand) James Wattana	10–6	(England) Paul Wykes
(Wales) Michael White	10–4	(India) David Singh
(Northern Ireland) Jordan Brown	10–7	(England) Del Smith
(Republic of Ireland) Brendan O'Donoghue	10–8	(England) Nic Barrow

Rounds 2–5

Round 2 Best of 19 frames
(England) Lee Page	6
(Thailand) James Wattana	10
(England) Matthew Selt	10
(Thailand) Thepchaiya Un-Nooh	8
(England) Stephen Rowlings	6
(England) Sam Baird	10
(England) Lee Spick	8
(England) Joe Jogia	10
(Thailand) Noppadol Sangnil	10
(Wales) Michael White	9
(Belgium) Bjorn Haneveer	10
(Northern Ireland) Jordan Brown	9
(Northern Ireland) Patrick Wallace	7
(Scotland) Mark Boyle	10
(China) Li Hang	9
(Republic of Ireland) David Hogan	10
(China) Xiao Guodong	9
(Malta) Tony Drago	10
(England) Chris Norbury	4
(China) Mei Xiwen	10
(England) Craig Steadman	4
(China) Zhang Anda	10
(England) Matthew Couch	8
(Republic of Ireland) Brendan O'Donoghue	10
(England) Ben Woollaston	10
(England) Andrew Norman	5
(Thailand) Atthasit Mahitthi	4
(England) Jimmy Robertson	10
(England) Simon Bedford	10
(Wales) Ian Preece	4
(Wales) Daniel Wells	7
(England) David Gray	10

Round 3 Best of 19 frames
(England) Peter Lines	8
(Thailand) James Wattana	10
(England) Barry Pinches	10
(England) Matthew Selt	8
(Republic of Ireland) Joe Delaney	10
(England) Sam Baird	0
(Wales) Paul Davies	10
(England) Joe Jogia	7
(England) Rod Lawler	10
(Thailand) Noppadol Sangnil	7
(England) Dave Gilbert	6
(Belgium) Bjorn Haneveer	10
(England) Jimmy White	10
(Scotland) Mark Boyle	8
(England) Tom Ford	10
(Republic of Ireland) David Hogan	3
(China) Liu Song	7
(Malta) Tony Drago	10
(Republic of Ireland) David Morris	10
(China) Mei Xiwen	8
(England) John Parrott	6
(China) Zhang Anda	10
(China) Jin Long	10
(Republic of Ireland) Brendan O'Donoghue	6
(England) David Roe	10
(England) Ben Woollaston	9
(England) Mark Joyce	10
(England) Jimmy Robertson	9
(England) Robert Milkins	10
(England) Simon Bedford	6
(England) Andy Hicks	7
(England) David Gray	10

Round 4 Best of 19 frames
(Scotland) Marcus Campbell	10
(Thailand) James Wattana	5
(England) Mark Davis	10
(England) Barry Pinches	7
(England) Adrian Gunnell	10
(Republic of Ireland) Joe Delaney	7
(Scotland) Alan McManus	10
(Wales) Paul Davies	9
(Wales) Dominic Dale	5
(England) Rod Lawler	10
(England) Martin Gould	10
(Belgium) Bjorn Haneveer	8
(Republic of Ireland) Ken Doherty	10
(England) Jimmy White	3
(England) Anthony Hamilton	6
(England) Tom Ford	10
(England) Ian McCulloch	10
(Malta) Tony Drago	6
(Scotland) Jamie Burnett	6
(Republic of Ireland) David Morris	10
(England) Andrew Higginson	8
(China) Zhang Anda	10
(England) Rory McLeod	10
(China) Jin Long	3
(England) Stuart Pettman	10
(England) David Roe	6
(Republic of Ireland) Michael Judge	8
(England) Mark Joyce	10
(England) Mike Dunn	10
(England) Robert Milkins	8
(England) Jimmy Michie	10
(England) David Gray	2

Round 5 Best of 19 frames
(Wales) Matthew Stevens	9
(Scotland) Marcus Campbell	10
(England) Dave Harold	7
(England) Mark Davis	10
(England) Steve Davis	10
(England) Adrian Gunnell	4
(Republic of Ireland) Fergal O'Brien	10
(Scotland) Alan McManus	4
(China) Liang Wenbo	10
(England) Rod Lawler	2
(England) Nigel Bond	4
(England) Martin Gould	10
(Northern Ireland) Joe Swail	1
(Republic of Ireland) Ken Doherty	10
(England) Judd Trump	3
(England) Tom Ford	10
(England) Barry Hawkins	10
(England) Ian McCulloch	7
(England) Michael Holt	10
(Republic of Ireland) David Morris	6
(England) Ricky Walden	8
(China) Zhang Anda	10
(Northern Ireland) Gerard Greene	10
(England) Rory McLeod	9
(England) Stuart Bingham	2
(England) Stuart Pettman	10
(England) Jamie Cope	10
(England) Mark Joyce	5
(England) Stephen Lee	10
(England) Mike Dunn	2
(Scotland) Graeme Dott	10
(England) Jimmy Michie	5

== Century breaks ==
=== Televised stage centuries ===
There were 60 centuries in the televised stage of the World Championship.

- 146, 131, 122, 101, 100 – Mark Allen
- 146, 130, 127, 116, 115, 112, 110, 105 – Graeme Dott
- 142, 117, 108, 106, 104, 103 – Mark Selby
- 140, 124, 116, 112, 107, 106, 104 – Neil Robertson
- 137, 120, 103 – Ding Junhui
- 128, 108, 100 – Shaun Murphy
- 128, 102 – Steve Davis
- 127, 103 – Liang Wenbo
- 127 – Stephen Lee
- 122, 104, 100 – Ali Carter
- 121, 115, 114, 106 – John Higgins
- 121 – Stephen Hendry
- 120, 114 – Stephen Maguire
- 117, 111, 108, 106, 104, 100 – Ronnie O'Sullivan
- 116, 103, 102 – Martin Gould
- 115 – Mark Williams
- 112 – Michael Holt
- 112 – Marco Fu
- 107 – Tom Ford

=== Qualifying stage centuries ===
There were 50 century breaks in the qualifying stage of the World Championship.

- 140 – James Wattana
- 139, 100 – Mark Joyce
- 138, 133, 121, 101 – Bjorn Haneveer
- 137, 104 – Matthew Stevens
- 137, 103 – Jimmy White
- 134, 114, 113, 103, 101 – Zhang Anda
- 134 – David Gray
- 133 – Barry Hawkins
- 132, 121 – Rod Lawler
- 132, 120, 100 – Tom Ford
- 131, 126, 105 – Michael White
- 131, 104 – Chris Norbury
- 129, 114 – Martin Gould
- 129 – Nigel Bond
- 128, 113, 104 – Adrian Gunnell
- 116, 103 – Brendan O'Donoghue
- 116, 100 – Mark Davis
- 115, 103 – Craig Steadman
- 108 – Jamie Cope
- 107 – Tony Drago
- 105 – Joe Jogia
- 104 – Matthew Couch
- 103 – Sam Baird
- 103 – Anthony Hamilton
- 102 – Xiao Guodong
- 101 – Jimmy Robertson
- 101 – Alan McManus
- 100 – Li Hang
