= 2009 Shanghai Masters =

Roewe Shanghai Masters
Tournament information
- Dates: 7–13 September 2009
- Venue: Shanghai Grand Stage
- City: Shanghai
- Country: China
- Organisation: WPBSA
- Format: Ranking event
- Total prize fund: £300,000
- Winner's share: £55,000
- Highest break: Shaun Murphy (ENG) (133)

Final
- Champion: Ronnie O'Sullivan (ENG)
- Runner-up: Liang Wenbo (CHN)
- Score: 10–5

The 2009 Roewe Shanghai Masters was a professional ranking snooker tournament that took place between 7–13 September 2009 at the Shanghai Grand Stage in Shanghai, China. It was the third edition of the tournament since it was first held in 2007.

Ronnie O'Sullivan won in the final 10–5 against Liang Wenbo.

== Prize fund ==
The breakdown of prize money for this year is shown below:

- Winner: £55,000
- Runner-up: £28,000
- Semi-final: £14,000
- Quarter-final: £7,525
- Last 16: £5,370
- Last 32: £3,640
- Last 48: £2,050
- Last 64: £1,400
- Stage one highest break: £500
- Stage two highest break: £2,000
- Total: £300,000

== Wildcard round ==
These matches were played in Shanghai on September 7.

Match		Score	
WC1	Marcus Campbell (SCO)	5–1	Tang Jun (CHN)
WC2	Andrew Higginson (ENG)	1–5	Tian Pengfei (CHN)
WC3	Ken Doherty (IRL)	5–0	Aditya Mehta (IND)
WC4	Graeme Dott (SCO)	5–3	Mohammed Shehab (UAE)
WC5	Nigel Bond (ENG)	5–4	Yu Delu (CHN)
WC6	Gerard Greene (NIR)	4–5	Li Yan (CHN)
WC7	Matthew Selt (ENG)	5–0	Shi Hanqing (CHN)

== Main draw ==
Last 32; Best of 9 frames
1	(England) Ricky Walden	5
(England) Mark King	1
11	(Scotland) Stephen Hendry	5
(Scotland) Marcus Campbell	4
15	(England) Peter Ebdon	1
(China) Liang Wenbo	5
6	(England) Ali Carter	5
(China) Tian Pengfei	3
5	(England) Shaun Murphy	5
(England) Michael Holt	1
13	(England) Joe Perry	4
(England) Jamie Cope	5
10	(Australia) Neil Robertson	4
(Republic of Ireland) Ken Doherty	5
4	(Scotland) Stephen Maguire (Note: Maguire withdrew due to a shoulder injury (internal bleeding in muscle))	w/d
(England) Barry Hawkins	w/o
3	(England) Ronnie O'Sullivan	5
(Scotland) Graeme Dott	0
9	(Hong Kong) Marco Fu	5
(England) Nigel Bond	4
14	(China) Ding Junhui	5
(England) Stephen Lee	2
8	(England) Mark Selby	3
(England) Stuart Bingham	5
7	(Wales) Ryan Day	5
(China) Li Yan	3
12	(Northern Ireland) Mark Allen	2
(Wales) Matthew Stevens	5
16	(Wales) Mark Williams	5
(Northern Ireland) Joe Swail	3
2	(Scotland) John Higgins	5
(England) Matthew Selt	2

Last 16; Best of 9 frames
1	(England) Ricky Walden	5
11	(Scotland) Stephen Hendry	1
(China) Liang Wenbo	5
6	(England) Ali Carter	0
5	(England) Shaun Murphy	5
(England) Jamie Cope	0
(Republic of Ireland) Ken Doherty	5
(England) Barry Hawkins	4
3	(England) Ronnie O'Sullivan	5
9	(Hong Kong) Marco Fu	2
14	(China) Ding Junhui	5
(England) Stuart Bingham	2
7	(Wales) Ryan Day	5
(Wales) Matthew Stevens	1
16	(Wales) Mark Williams	1
2	(Scotland) John Higgins	5

Quarter-finals; Best of 9 frames
1	(England) Ricky Walden	3
(China) Liang Wenbo	5
5	(England) Shaun Murphy	5
(Republic of Ireland) Ken Doherty	0
3	(England) Ronnie O'Sullivan	5
14	(China) Ding Junhui	3
7	(Wales) Ryan Day	1
2	(Scotland) John Higgins	5

Semi-finals; Best of 11 frames
(China) Liang Wenbo	6
5	(England) Shaun Murphy	5
3	(England) Ronnie O'Sullivan	6
2	(Scotland) John Higgins	1

Final; Best of 19 frames
(China) Liang Wenbo	5
3	(England) Ronnie O'Sullivan	10

== Final ==
Final: Best of 19 frames. Referee: Eirian Williams. Shanghai Grand Stage, Shanghai, China, 13 September 2009.
Liang Wenbo; China	5–10	Ronnie O'Sullivan (3); England
Afternoon: 2–70 (70), 59–66, 53–78, 67–27, 0–87 (80), 81–0 (81), 7–75 (75), 31–99 (91), 89–0 (89); Evening: 63–9, 0–109 (109), 62–51, 26–85 (56), 43–77 (69), 0–71 (71)
81	Highest break	109
0	Century breaks	1
2	50+ breaks	8

== Qualifying ==
These matches took place between 3 and 6 August 2009 at the Pontin's Centre, Prestatyn, Wales.

Round 1 Best of 9 frames
(Wales) Daniel Wells	5
(Wales) Ian Preece	3
(China) Li Hang (Note: Withdrew because of visa-problems.)	w/d
(Malta) Tony Drago	w/o
(England) Chris Norbury	2
(Republic of Ireland) Brendan O'Donoghue	5
(Belgium) Bjorn Haneveer	5
(England) David Gray	1
(Thailand) Atthasit Mahitthi	3
(England) Joe Jogia	5
(England) Craig Steadman	5
(China) Zhang Anda	2
(China) Xiao Guodong	5
(Thailand) Thepchaiya Un-Nooh	4
(England) Simon Bedford	5
(Republic of Ireland) David Hogan	3
(England) Stephen Rowlings	2
(England) Jimmy Robertson	5
(England) Matthew Couch	w/o
(China) Mei Xiwen	w/d
(England) Lee Spick	5
(England) Andrew Norman	1
(England) Lee Page	2
(Wales) Michael White	5
(England) Ben Woollaston	5
(England) Sam Baird	4
(Northern Ireland) Patrick Wallace	5
(Northern Ireland) Jordan Brown	4
(Thailand) Noppadol Sangnil	5
(Thailand) James Wattana	2
(England) Matthew Selt	5
(Scotland) Mark Boyle	2

Round 2 Best of 9 frames
(Republic of Ireland) Joe Delaney	5
(Wales) Daniel Wells	3
(Republic of Ireland) David Morris	4
(Malta) Tony Drago	5
(England) David Gilbert	5
(Republic of Ireland) Brendan O'Donoghue	2
(England) Jimmy White	5
(Belgium) Bjorn Haneveer	0
(England) Mark Joyce	2
(England) Joe Jogia	5
(England) Robert Milkins	5
(England) Craig Steadman	1
(England) Rod Lawler	5
(China) Xiao Guodong	4
(China) Liu Song	0
(England) Simon Bedford	5
(England) Barry Pinches	4
(England) Jimmy Robertson	5
(China) Jin Long	4
(England) Matthew Couch	5
(England) Tom Ford	2
(England) Lee Spick	5
(England) John Parrott	0
(Wales) Michael White	5
(England) Peter Lines	5
(England) Ben Woollaston	3
(Wales) Paul Davies	3
(Northern Ireland) Patrick Wallace	5
(England) David Roe	3
(Thailand) Noppadol Sangnil	5
(England) Andy Hicks	4
(England) Matthew Selt	5

Round 3 Best of 9 frames
(England) Stuart Pettman	5
(Republic of Ireland) Joe Delaney	2
(Scotland) Marcus Campbell	5
(Malta) Tony Drago	4
(Scotland) Alan McManus	0
(England) David Gilbert	5
(England) Andrew Higginson	5
(England) Jimmy White	2
(Scotland) Jamie Burnett	5
(England) Joe Jogia	4
(England) Anthony Hamilton	5
(England) Robert Milkins	4
(Republic of Ireland) Ken Doherty	5
(England) Rod Lawler	2
(England) Ian McCulloch	1
(England) Simon Bedford	5
(England) Mike Dunn	0
(England) Jimmy Robertson	5
(Wales) Dominic Dale	5
(England) Matthew Couch	2
(Republic of Ireland) Michael Judge	1
(England) Lee Spick	5
(England) Mark Davis	5
(Wales) Michael White	3
(England) Martin Gould	5
(England) Peter Lines	0
(England) Rory McLeod	3
(Northern Ireland) Patrick Wallace	5
(England) Adrian Gunnell	5
(Thailand) Noppadol Sangnil	2
(England) Jimmy Michie	1
(England) Matthew Selt	5

Round 4 Best of 9 frames
(England) Mark King	5
(England) Stuart Pettman	4
(England) Judd Trump	2
(Scotland) Marcus Campbell	5
(China) Liang Wenbo (Note: Match was held over and played in Shanghai.)	5
(England) David Gilbert	2
(England) Dave Harold	2
(England) Andrew Higginson	5
(England) Michael Holt	5
(Scotland) Jamie Burnett	4
(England) Jamie Cope	5
(England) Anthony Hamilton	0
(Republic of Ireland) Fergal O'Brien	4
(Republic of Ireland) Ken Doherty	5
(England) Barry Hawkins	5
(England) Simon Bedford	1
(Scotland) Graeme Dott	5
(England) Jimmy Robertson	4
(England) Nigel Bond	5
(Wales) Dominic Dale	4
(England) Stephen Lee	5
(England) Lee Spick	3
(England) Stuart Bingham	5
(England) Mark Davis	2
(Northern Ireland) Gerard Greene	5
(England) Martin Gould	3
(Wales) Matthew Stevens	5
(Northern Ireland) Patrick Wallace	1
(Northern Ireland) Joe Swail	5
(England) Adrian Gunnell	1
(England) Steve Davis	4
(England) Matthew Selt	5

== Century breaks ==
=== Qualifying stage centuries ===
- 138 – Dominic Dale
- 135 – Gerard Greene
- 129, 120 – Jordan Brown
- 127 – Martin Gould
- 126 – Mark Davis
- 118, 113, 102 – Xiao Guodong
- 115 – Patrick Wallace
- 114, 101 – Andrew Higginson
- 113 – Graeme Dott
- 112 – Robert Milkins
- 110, 103 – Lee Spick
- 108 – Rod Lawler
- 105 – Bjorn Haneveer
- 105 – Matthew Selt
- 105 – Judd Trump
- 100 – Tony Drago

=== Televised stage centuries ===
- 133, 123, 106 – Shaun Murphy
- 132, 101 – Ding Junhui
- 129 – Ken Doherty
- 128, 104 – Matthew Selt
- 122, 103 – Ricky Walden
- 120, 118 – Matthew Stevens
- 118, 102 – Liang Wenbo
- 111 – Ryan Day
- 110, 101 – Tian Pengfei
- 109, 101, 101 – Ronnie O'Sullivan
- 102 – Graeme Dott
- 101 – Mark Williams
- 101 – Stuart Bingham
