= 2009 UK Championship =

2009 Pukka Pies UK Championship

Tournament information
- Dates: 5–13 December 2009
- Venue: Telford International Centre
- City: Telford
- Country: England
- Organisation: WPBSA
- Format: Ranking event
- Total prize fund: £625,000
- Winner's share: £100,000
- Highest break: Mark Selby (ENG) (141); Stephen Lee (ENG) (141)

Final
- Champion: Ding Junhui (CHN)
- Runner-up: John Higgins (SCO)
- Score: 10–8

The 2009 UK Championship (officially the 2009 Pukka Pies UK Championship) was a professional ranking snooker tournament that took place between 5–13 December 2009 at the Telford International Centre in Telford, England.

This was the first time that the UK Championship was sponsored by Pukka Pies. Shaun Murphy was the defending champion but he lost 3–9 to Ding Junhui in the Last 16. Ding won the tournament for his second UK title, beating John Higgins 10–8 in the final.

== Prize fund ==
The breakdown of prize money for this year is shown below:

Winner: £100,000
Runner-up: £46,000
Semi-final: £23,250
Quarter-final: £16,450
Last 16: £12,050
Last 32: £8,750
Last 48: £5,500
Last 64: £2,300

Stage one highest break: £500
Stage two highest break: £5,000

Stage one maximum break: £1,000
Stage two maximum break: £25,000

Total: £625,000

== Main draw ==
Last 32; Best of 17 frames
1	Shaun Murphy (ENG)	9
Gerard Greene (NIR)	5
13	Ding Junhui (CHN)	9
Mike Dunn (ENG)	5
11	Mark Allen (NIR)	8
Stephen Lee (ENG)	9
5	Ali Carter (ENG)	9
Rory McLeod (ENG)	7
8	Marco Fu (HKG)	3
Peter Lines (ENG)	9
15	Mark Williams (WAL)	9*
Graeme Dott (SCO)	2
12	Joe Perry (ENG)	4
Stuart Bingham (ENG)	9
4	Stephen Maguire (SCO)	9
Michael Holt (ENG)	6
3	Ronnie O'Sullivan (ENG)	9
Matthew Stevens (WAL)	3
14	Peter Ebdon (ENG)	9
Judd Trump (ENG)	4
10	Stephen Hendry (SCO)	9
Steve Davis (ENG)	6
7	Mark Selby (ENG)	9
Jamie Cope (ENG)	8
6	Ryan Day (WAL)	3
Liang Wenbo (CHN)	9
16	Mark King (ENG)	9
Anthony Hamilton (ENG)	2
9	Neil Robertson (AUS)	9
Tom Ford (ENG)	3
2	John Higgins (SCO)	9
Ricky Walden (ENG)	7

Last 16; Best of 17 frames
1	(England) Shaun Murphy	3
13	(China) Ding Junhui	9
(England) Stephen Lee	5
5	(England) Ali Carter	9
(England) Peter Lines	9
15	(Wales) Mark Williams	8
(England) Stuart Bingham	3
4	(Scotland) Stephen Maguire	9
3	(England) Ronnie O'Sullivan	9
14	(England) Peter Ebdon	3
10	(Scotland) Stephen Hendry	5
7	(England) Mark Selby	9
(China) Liang Wenbo	9
16	(England) Mark King	2
9	(Australia) Neil Robertson	8
2	(Scotland) John Higgins	9

Quarter-finals; Best of 17 frames
13	(China) Ding Junhui	9
5	(England) Ali Carter	8
(England) Peter Lines	5
4	(Scotland) Stephen Maguire	9
3	(England) Ronnie O'Sullivan	9
7	(England) Mark Selby	3
(China) Liang Wenbo	2
2	(Scotland) John Higgins	9

Semi-finals; Best of 17 frames
13	(China) Ding Junhui	9
4	(Scotland) Stephen Maguire	5
3	(England) Ronnie O'Sullivan	8
2	(Scotland) John Higgins	9

Final; Best of 19 frames
13	(China) Ding Junhui	10
2	(Scotland) John Higgins	8

* Dott withdrew due to illness.

== Final ==
Final: Best of 19 frames. Referee: Eirian Williams. Telford International Centre, Telford, England, 13 December 2009.
Ding Junhui (13); China	10–8	John Higgins (2); Scotland
Afternoon: 93–11 (81), 43–75 (67), 101–27 (69), 32–77 (67), 78–4 (63), 51–62, 65–49, 0–96 (80); Evening: 58–22, 21–67, 78–12 (50), 12–99 (91), 5–68, 75–5 (74), 64–58, 62–49, 18–115 (115), 84–36 (75)
81	Highest break	115
0	Century breaks	1
6	50+ breaks	5

== Qualifying ==
These matches were held between 23 and 30 November 2009 at the Pontin's Centre, Prestatyn, Wales.

Round 1 Best of 17 frames
Chris Norbury (ENG)	3
Thepchaiya Un-Nooh (THA)	9
Lee Spick (ENG)	5
Jordan Brown (NIR)	9
Lee Page (ENG)	4
James Wattana (THA)	9
Matthew Selt (ENG)	9
David Gray (ENG)	7
Xiao Guodong (CHN)	9
Zhang Anda (CHN)	5
Craig Steadman (ENG)	9
Andrew Norman (ENG)	5
Ben Woollaston (ENG)	9
Ian Preece (WAL)	4
Patrick Wallace (NIR)	9
Mark Boyle (SCO)	0
Atthasit Mahitthi (THA)	9
Mei Xiwen (CHN)	3
Li Hang (CHN)	7
Tony Drago (MLT)	9
Bjorn Haneveer (BEL)	4
Sam Baird (ENG)	9
Matthew Couch (ENG)	9
Brendan O'Donoghue (IRL)	7
Daniel Wells (WAL)	8
Michael White (WAL)	9
Stephen Rowlings (ENG)	8
Jimmy Robertson (ENG)	9
Noppadol Sangnil (THA)	8
David Hogan (IRL)	9
Simon Bedford (ENG)	9
Joe Jogia (ENG)	0

Round 2 Best of 17 frames
Rod Lawler (ENG)	7
(Thailand) Thepchaiya Un-Nooh	9
Andy Hicks (ENG)	9
(Northern Ireland) Jordan Brown	4
Robert Milkins (ENG)	9
(Thailand) James Wattana	5
David Roe (ENG)	4
(England) Matthew Selt	9
Peter Lines (ENG)	9
(China) Xiao Guodong	8
Barry Pinches (ENG)	7
(England) Craig Steadman	9
Jimmy White (ENG)	w/d
(England) Ben Woollaston	w/o
John Parrott (ENG)	9
(Northern Ireland) Patrick Wallace	8
Liu Song (CHN)	4
(Thailand) Atthasit Mahitthi	9
David Gilbert (ENG)	5
(Malta) Tony Drago	9
Joe Delaney (IRL)	9
(England) Sam Baird	8
Mark Joyce (ENG)	9
(England) Matthew Couch	4
Jin Long (CHN)	6
(Wales) Michael White	9
Paul Davies (WAL)	6
(England) Jimmy Robertson	9
Tom Ford (ENG)	9
(Republic of Ireland) David Hogan	7
David Morris (IRL)	3
(England) Simon Bedford	9

Round 3 Best of 17 frames
Alan McManus (SCO)	6
(Thailand) Thepchaiya Un-Nooh	9
Mike Dunn (ENG)	9
(England) Andy Hicks	6
Martin Gould (ENG)	5
(England) Robert Milkins	9
Rory McLeod (ENG)	9
(England) Matthew Selt	3
Ian McCulloch (ENG)	6
(England) Peter Lines	9
Marcus Campbell (SCO)	8
(England) Craig Steadman	9
Jimmy Michie (ENG)	9
(England) Ben Woollaston	7
Dominic Dale (WAL)	9
(England) John Parrott	6
Adrian Gunnell (ENG)	9
(Thailand) Atthasit Mahitthi	3
Mark Davis (ENG)	9
(Malta) Tony Drago	7
Michael Judge (IRL)	9
(Republic of Ireland) Joe Delaney	5
Ken Doherty (IRL)	9
(England) Mark Joyce	6
Jamie Burnett (SCO)	8
(Wales) Michael White	9
Anthony Hamilton (ENG)	9
(England) Jimmy Robertson	4
Stuart Pettman (ENG)	5
(England) Tom Ford	9
Andrew Higginson (ENG)	9
(England) Simon Bedford	6

Round 4 Best of 17 frames
Gerard Greene (NIR)	9
(Thailand) Thepchaiya Un-Nooh	5
Joe Swail (NIR)	2
(England) Mike Dunn	9
Stephen Lee (ENG)	9
(England) Robert Milkins	7
Fergal O'Brien (IRL)	7
(England) Rory McLeod	9
Nigel Bond (ENG)	6
(England) Peter Lines	9
Graeme Dott (SCO)	9
(England) Craig Steadman	5
Stuart Bingham (ENG)	9
(England) Jimmy Michie	2
Michael Holt (ENG)	9
(Wales) Dominic Dale	4
Matthew Stevens (WAL)	9
(England) Adrian Gunnell	1
Judd Trump (ENG)	9
(England) Mark Davis	7
Steve Davis (ENG)	9
(Republic of Ireland) Michael Judge	7
Jamie Cope (ENG)	9
(Republic of Ireland) Ken Doherty	6
Liang Wenbo (CHN)	9
(Wales) Michael White	4
Dave Harold (ENG)	5
(England) Anthony Hamilton	9
Barry Hawkins (ENG)	5
(England) Tom Ford	9
Ricky Walden (ENG)	9
(England) Andrew Higginson	6

== Century breaks ==
=== Televised stage centuries ===
- 141, 136, 132, 115, 102, 101 – Mark Selby
- 141, 103 – Stephen Lee
- 137, 127, 119, 100 – Neil Robertson
- 134, 118, 116, 114, 110, 104 – Ronnie O'Sullivan
- 134, 114, 113 – Ding Junhui
- 130, 115, 112, 108 – Stephen Hendry
- 129, 127, 116, 115, 115, 110, 109 – John Higgins
- 125 – Ryan Day
- 124, 102 – Ali Carter
- 124 – Liang Wenbo
- 121, 112, 104, 100 – Mark Allen
- 119, 101 – Shaun Murphy
- 114 – Peter Lines
- 108, 103 – Stephen Maguire
- 104 – Marco Fu
- 101 – Matthew Stevens
- 100 – Jamie Cope

=== Qualifying stage centuries ===
- 143, 125, 110, 104 – Tom Ford
- 141 – Stuart Bingham
- 138, 101 – Thepchaiya Un-Nooh
- 135, 115 – Jimmy Robertson
- 134 – Brendan O'Donoghue
- 129, 110 – Stephen Lee
- 128 – David Gilbert
- 127, 108 – Simon Bedford
- 127, 103 – Liang Wenbo
- 122 – Mark Joyce
- 120 – Anthony Hamilton
- 114, 113, 105, 101, 100 – Peter Lines
- 113, 100 – Tony Drago
- 111 – Lee Spick
- 111 – Robert Milkins
- 111 – Rod Lawler
- 108 – David Gray
- 107 – Matthew Stevens
- 106 – Matthew Couch
- 104, 102 – Rory McLeod
- 104, 100 – Craig Steadman
- 103 – Mark Davis
- 102 – Xiao Guodong
- 100 – David Morris
- 100 – Dominic Dale
- 100 – Andrew Higginson
