= 2009–10 snooker season =

Details
- Duration: 16 May 2009 – 8 May 2010
- Tournaments: 38 (6 ranking events)

Triple Crown winners
- UK Championship: (China) Ding Junhui
- Masters: (England) Mark Selby
- World Championship: (Australia) Neil Robertson

The 2009–10 snooker season was a series of snooker tournaments played between 16 May 2009 and 8 May 2010. There were six ranking events, two less than in the previous season. The Bahrain Championship was not held again, and the Northern Ireland Trophy was removed from the calendar too. The Jiangsu Classic was held for the first time.

== New professional players ==
Countries

- Belgium
- China
- England
- Ireland
- Malta
- Northern Ireland
- Scotland
- Thailand
- Wales

Note: new means in these case, that these players were not on the 2008/2009 professional Main Tour.

International champions:

1. IBSF World Snooker Championship winner: (Thailand) Thepchaiya Un-Nooh
2. EBSA European Snooker Championships winner: (Republic of Ireland) David Hogan
3. EBSA International Play Off winner: (Malta) Tony Drago
4. ACBS Asian Snooker Championship winner: (Thailand) James Wattana
5. ACBS Asian Under-21 Snooker Championship winner: (China) Zhang Anda

NGB nominations

6. English nomination 1: (Note: Jimmy Roberson qualified by topping the Pro Ticket Tour rankings.) (England) Jimmy Roberson
7. English nomination 2: (Note: Sam Baird qualified by winning the Pro Ticket Tour Play Offs.) (England) Sam Baird
8. Welsh nomination: (Note: Michael White qualified by topping the Welsh rankings.) (Wales) Michael White
9. Scottish nomination: (Note: Mark Boyle qualified by topping the Scottish rankings.) (Scotland) Mark Boyle
10. Irish nomination: (Note: Brendan O'Donoghue qualified by topping the Irish rankings.) (Republic of Ireland) Brendan O'Donoghue
11. Northern Irish nomination: (Note: Jordan Brown qualified by topping the Northern Irish rankings.) (Northern Ireland) Jordan Brown
12. ACBS Asian Nomination: (China) Mei Xiwen

From PIOS Tour

13. (China) Xiao Guodong
14. (England) Lee Page
15. (Belgium) Bjorn Haneveer
16. (England) Stephen Rowlings
17. (England) Ben Woollaston
18. (Thailand) Noppadol Sangnil
19. (England) Craig Steadman
20. (England) Chris Norbury

WPBSA Wildcard

21. (England) Joe Jogia (Note: Joe Jogia could not take his place via the PIOS Tour, as he was not a member of his national governing body.)

== Calendar ==
The following table outlines the results and dates for all the ranking and major invitational events.

=== World Snooker Tour ===
Start	Finish	Country	Tournament name	Venue	City	Winner	Runner-up	Score	Ref.
4 Jun	7 Jun	CHN	Jiangsu Classic	Wuxi City Sports Park Stadium	Wuxi	(Northern Ireland) Mark Allen	(China) Ding Junhui	6–0	
7 Jul	12 Jul	THA	Six-red World Grand Prix	Montien Riverside Hotel	Bangkok	(England) Jimmy White	(England) Barry Hawkins	8–6	
28 Jul	30 Jul	ENG	Pro Challenge Series – Event 1	Northern Snooker Centre	Leeds	(Scotland) Stephen Maguire	(Scotland) Alan McManus	5–2	
31 Aug	1 Sep	WAL	Pro Challenge Series – Event 2	Pontin's	Prestatyn	(Republic of Ireland) Ken Doherty	(England) Martin Gould	6–2	
7 Sep	13 Sep	CHN	Shanghai Masters	Shanghai Grand Stage	Shanghai	(England) Ronnie O'Sullivan	(China) Liang Wenbo	10–5	
3 Oct	11 Oct	SCO	Grand Prix	Kelvin Hall	Glasgow	(Australia) Neil Robertson	(China) Ding Junhui	9–4	
26 Oct	29 Oct	WAL	Masters Qualifying Event	Pontin's	Prestatyn	(England) Rory McLeod	(England) Andrew Higginson	6–1	
9 Nov	11 Nov	ENG	Pro Challenge Series – Event 3	Willie Thorne Snooker Centre	Leicester	(England) Robert Milkins	(England) Joe Jogia	5–3	
3 Sep	29 Nov	ENG	Premier League	Potters Leisure Resort	Hopton-on-Sea	(England) Shaun Murphy	(England) Ronnie O'Sullivan	7–3	
5 Dec	13 Dec	ENG	UK Championship	Telford International Centre	Telford	(China) Ding Junhui	(Scotland) John Higgins	10–8	
10 Jan	17 Jan	ENG	Masters	Wembley Arena	London	(England) Mark Selby	(England) Ronnie O'Sullivan	10–9	
25 Jan	31 Jan	WAL	Welsh Open	Newport Centre	Newport	(Scotland) John Higgins	(England) Ali Carter	9–4	
16 Feb	18 Feb	ENG	Pro Challenge Series – Event 5	George Scott Snooker Club	Liverpool	(England) Barry Hawkins	(England) Michael Holt	5–1	
4 Jan	25 Mar	ENG	Championship League	Crondon Park Golf Club	Stock	(Hong Kong) Marco Fu	(Northern Ireland) Mark Allen	3–2	
29 Mar	4 Apr	CHN	China Open	Beijing University Students Gymnasium	Beijing	(Wales) Mark Williams	(China) Ding Junhui	10–6	
17 Apr	3 May	ENG	World Snooker Championship	Crucible Theatre	Sheffield	(Australia) Neil Robertson	(Scotland) Graeme Dott	18–13	

Ranking event
Non-ranking event

=== World Ladies Billiards and Snooker Association ===
Start	Finish	Country	Tournament name	Venue	City	Winner	Runner-up	Score	Ref.
12 Sep	12 Sep	ENG	Wytech Masters	North East Derbyshire Snooker Centre	Chesterfield	(England) Reanne Evans	(England) Maria Catalano	3–0	
13 Sep	13 Sep	ENG	UK Ladies Championship	North East Derbyshire Snooker Centre	Chesterfield	(England) Reanne Evans	(England) Maria Catalano	3–0	
10 Oct	10 Oct	ENG	East Anglian Championship	Cambridge Snooker Centre	Cambridge	(England) Reanne Evans	(England) Emma Bonney	3–0	
14 Nov	14 Nov	ENG	British Open	Newmarket Snooker & Bowl	Newmarket	(England) Reanne Evans	(England) Katie Henrick	3–1	
6 Feb	6 Feb	ENG	South Coast Classic	Q Ball Snooker Club	Eastbourne	(England) Reanne Evans	(England) Maria Catalano	3–1	
6 Mar	6 Mar	ENG	Connie Gough Memorial	Stadium Snooker Club	Birmingham	(England) Reanne Evans	(England) Maria Catalano	3–1	
3 Apr	7 Apr	ENG	World Ladies Championship	Cambridge Snooker Centre	Cambridge	(England) Reanne Evans	(England) Maria Catalano	5–1	

=== Pontin's International Open Series ===
Start	Finish	Country	Tournament name	Venue	City	Winner	Runner-up	Score	Ref.
22 Jun	26 Jun	WAL	PIOS I	Pontin's	Prestatyn	(England) Jack Lisowski	(England) Liam Highfield	6–5	
27 Jul	31 Jul	WAL	PIOS II	Pontin's	Prestatyn	(England) Liam Highfield	(England) Neal Jones	6–2	
23 Aug	28 Aug	WAL	PIOS III	Pontin's	Prestatyn	(England) Paul Davison	(England) Kyren Wilson	6–4	
19 Oct	23 Oct	WAL	PIOS IV	Pontin's	Prestatyn	(Wales) Jamie Jones	(Wales) Jak Jones	6–0	
7 Dec	11 Dec	WAL	PIOS V	Pontin's	Prestatyn	(Scotland) Anthony McGill	(England) Farakh Ajaib	6–0	
28 Feb	5 Mar	WAL	PIOS VI	Pontin's	Prestatyn	(England) Kyren Wilson	(England) Liam Highfield	6–4	
11 Apr	16 Apr	WAL	PIOS VII	Pontin's	Prestatyn	(England) Paul Davison	(England) Justin Astley	6–2	
4 May	8 May	WAL	PIOS VIII	Pontin's	Prestatyn	(England) Jack Lisowski	(England) Justin Astley	6–1	

=== Other events ===
Start	Finish	Country	Tournament name	Venue	City	Winner	Runner-up	Score	Ref.
16 May	17 May	IRL	World Series of Snooker Killarney	INEC	Killarney	(England) Shaun Murphy	(England) Jimmy White	5–1	
7 Jul	12 Jul	CHN	Beijing International Challenge	Beijing University Students Gymnasium	Beijing	(China) Liang Wenbo	(Scotland) Stephen Maguire	7–6	
13 Jul	17 Jul	HKG	General Cup	General Snooker Club	Hong Kong	(England) Ricky Walden	(China) Liang Wenbo	6–2	
22 Jul	26 Jul	ENG	Paul Hunter English Open	Northern Snooker Centre	Leeds	(England) Stuart Bingham	(England) Simon Bedford	6–0	
22 Jul	26 Jul	TWN	World Games	Chung Cheng Martial Arts Stadium	Kaohsiung	(United Kingdom) Nigel Bond	(United Kingdom) David Grace	3–0	
24 Jul	26 Jul	IRL	Irish Classic	Celbridge Snooker Club	Kildare	(Northern Ireland) Joe Swail	(Republic of Ireland) Fergal O'Brien	5–0	
13 Aug	16 Aug	GER	Paul Hunter Classic	Stadthall	Fürth	(England) Shaun Murphy	(England) Jimmy White	4–0	
17 Oct	18 Oct	CZE	World Series of Snooker Prague	Aréna Sparta Podvinný Mlýn	Prague	(England) Jimmy White	(Scotland) Graeme Dott	5–3	
31 Oct	1 Nov	SCO	Legends of Snooker	Rothes Halls	Glenrothes	(Scotland) Stephen Hendry	(Republic of Ireland) Ken Doherty	5–3	
31 Oct	7 Nov	VIE	Asian Indoor Games	Phan Đình Phùng Gymnasium	Ho Chi Minh City	(China) Jin Long	(Afghanistan) Nader Khan Sultani	4–0	
14 Nov	15 Nov	WAL	Pontin's Pro Am Series	Pontin's	Prestatyn	(England) Stuart Bingham	(Republic of Ireland) Ken Doherty	3–1	
15 Dec	18 Dec	IRL	Six-red World Championship	INEC	Killarney	(England) Mark Davis	(Wales) Mark Williams	6–3	
19 Dec	20 Dec	NED	Dutch Open	De Dieze	's-Hertogenbosch	(Belgium) Bjorn Haneveer	(England) Matthew Couch	6–3	
12 Feb	14 Feb	FIN	Finnish Snooker Challenge	Turku Sports Club	Turku	(Wales) Mark Williams	(Finland) Robin Hull	6–1	

== Official rankings ==
The top 16 of the world rankings, these players automatically played in the final rounds of the world ranking events and were invited for the Masters.

No.	Ch.	Player	Points 2007/08	Points 2008/09	Total
1	Steady	(England) Ronnie O'Sullivan	29700	23875	53575
2	Steady	(Scotland) Stephen Maguire	25975	22075	48050
3	Steady	(England) Shaun Murphy	23700	23475	47175
4	▲	(Scotland) John Higgins	14825	31000	45825
5	▲	(England) Ali Carter	18425	24100	42525
6	▲	(Wales) Ryan Day	19425	21250	40675
7	▼	(England) Mark Selby	20050	17925	37975
8	▲	(Hong Kong) Marco Fu	18075	19275	37350
9	▲	(Australia) Neil Robertson	12400	22825	35225
10	▼	(Scotland) Stephen Hendry	16900	16225	33125
11	▲	(Northern Ireland) Mark Allen	15075	17800	32875
12	Steady	(England) Joe Perry	18250	14625	32875
13	▼	(China) Ding Junhui	15869	13775	29644
14	▼	(England) Peter Ebdon	14975	14425	29400
15	▲	(Wales) Mark Williams	15100	14219	29319
16	▼	(England) Mark King	13675	14625	28300

== World ranking points ==
No.	Ch	Player	Points 08/09	SM	GP	UK	WO	CO	WSC	Points 09/10	Total
1	▲3	(Scotland) John Higgins	31000	4480	4480	6400	5000	2660	3800	26820	57820
2	▲7	(Australia) Neil Robertson	22825	980	7000	3040	1900	2660	10000	25580	48405
3	▼2	(England) Ronnie O'Sullivan	23875	7000	2660	5120	3200	980	5000	23960	47835
4	▲1	(England) Ali Carter	24100	2660	980	4000	4000	4480	6400	22520	46620
5	▲8	(China) Ding Junhui	13775	3500	5600	8000	700	5600	3800	27200	40975
6	▼4	(Scotland) Stephen Maguire	22075	980	2660	5120	3200	2660	3800	18420	40495
7	▼4	(England) Shaun Murphy	23475	4480	980	3040	700	980	5000	15180	38655
8	▲7	(Wales) Mark Williams	14219	2660	4480	3040	2500	7000	3800	23480	37699
9	▼2	(England) Mark Selby	17925	980	980	4000	2500	2660	6400	17520	35445
10	▲1	(Northern Ireland) Mark Allen	17800	980	3500	1120	2500	4480	5000	17580	35380
11	▼1	(Scotland) Stephen Hendry	16225	2660	2660	3040	1900	3500	3800	17560	33785
12	▼6	(Wales) Ryan Day	21250	3500	980	1120	2500	2660	1400	12160	33410
13	▲15	(Scotland) Graeme Dott	14025	1960	805	2240	1900	1960	8000	16865	30890
14	▼6	(Hong Kong) Marco Fu	19275	2660	980	1120	700	3500	1400	10360	29635
15	▲1	(England) Mark King	14625	1960	2660	3040	1900	3500	1400	14460	29085
16	▲10	(China) Liang Wenbo	12325	5600	1960	4000	575	805	2800	15740	28065

== Points distribution ==
2009/2010 Points distribution for world ranking events.

Tournament	Round →	L96	L80	L64	L48	L32	L16	QF	SF	F	W
Shanghai Masters	Unseeded loser	560	910	1260	1610	1960	2660	3500	4480	5600	7000
Shanghai Masters	Seeded loser	280	455	630	805	980	–	–	–	–	–
Grand Prix	Unseeded loser	560	910	1260	1610	1960	2660	3500	4480	5600	7000
Grand Prix	Seeded loser	280	455	630	805	980	–	–	–	–	–
UK Championship	Unseeded loser	640	1040	1440	1840	2240	3040	4000	5120	6400	8000
UK Championship	Seeded loser	320	520	720	920	1120	–	–	–	–	–
Welsh Open	Unseeded loser	400	650	900	1150	1400	1900	2500	3200	4000	5000
Welsh Open	Seeded loser	200	325	450	575	700	–	–	–	–	–
China Open	Unseeded loser	560	910	1260	1610	1960	2660	3500	4480	5600	7000
China Open	Seeded loser	280	455	630	805	980	–	–	–	–	–
World Championship	Unseeded loser	800	1300	1800	2300	2800	3800	5000	6400	8000	10000
World Championship	Seeded loser	400	650	900	1150	1400	–	–	–	–	–
