= Irish Amateur Championship (snooker) =

Tournament information
- Venue: Ivy Room
- Location: Carlow
- Country: Ireland
- Established: 1927; 99 years ago
- Organisation(s): Snooker & Billiards Ireland (formerly RIBSA)
- Format: Amateur event
- Recent edition: 2025
- Current champion: (Republic of Ireland) David Morris

The Irish Amateur Championship (occasionally known as the Irish National Championship) is an annual snooker competition played in Ireland and is the highest ranking amateur event in Ireland.

== History ==
The competition was first established back in 1927 which was won by T.H. Fayrey. Many former champions have gone on to play on the world tour such as Colm Gilcreest, David Morris, Vincent Muldoon, Brendan O'Donoghue, Rodney Goggins and, most notably, twice winner Ken Doherty. He went on to become the only former Irish champion to win the World Snooker Championship in 1997, when he ended Stephen Hendry's run of five consecutive wins.

Brendan O'Donoghue is the most successful player in the tournament's history, having won the competition a record seven times in the modern era. The reigning champion is David Morris, who defeated O'Donoghue 7–1 in the 2025 final to win the national title for the fifth time in his career.

== Winners ==
Year	Winner	Runner-up	Final score
1931	(Republic of Ireland) J. Ayres		
1932: Not contested
1933	(Republic of Ireland) Seumas Fenning		
1934: Not contested
1935	(Republic of Ireland) Seumas Fenning		
1936: Not contested
1937	(Republic of Ireland) P. J. O'Connor		
1938–1939: Not contested
1940	(Republic of Ireland) Pete Merrigan		
1941: Not contested
1942	(Republic of Ireland) P. J. O'Connor		
1943: Not contested
1944	(Republic of Ireland) Seumas Fenning		
1945–1946: Not contested
1947	(Republic of Ireland) Charlie Downey		
1948	(Republic of Ireland) Pete Merrigan		
1949	(Republic of Ireland) Seumas Fenning		
1950–1951: Not contested
1952	(Republic of Ireland) W. Brown		
1953	(Republic of Ireland) S. Brooks		
1954	(Republic of Ireland) Seumas Fenning		
1955	(Republic of Ireland) Seumas Fenning		
1956	(Republic of Ireland) W. Brown		
1957	(Republic of Ireland) J. Connolly		
1958	(Republic of Ireland) G. Gibson		
1959–1960: Not contested
1961	(Republic of Ireland) W. Brown		
1962	(Republic of Ireland) J. Weber		
1963	(Republic of Ireland) J. Rogers		
1964	(Republic of Ireland) J. Rogers		
1965	(Republic of Ireland) W. Fields		
1966	(Republic of Ireland) G. Hanway		
1967	(Republic of Ireland) Paddy Morgan	(Republic of Ireland) Billy Kelly	
1968	(Republic of Ireland) G. Hanway		
1969	(Republic of Ireland) D. Dally		
1970	(Republic of Ireland) Dessie Sheehan		
1971	(Republic of Ireland) Dessie Sheehan		
1972	(Republic of Ireland) J. Rogers		
1973	(Republic of Ireland) F. Murphy		
1974	(Republic of Ireland) P. Burke		
1975	(Republic of Ireland) F. Nathan		
1976	(Republic of Ireland) P. Burke		
1977	(Republic of Ireland) J. Clusker		
1978	(Republic of Ireland) Eugene Hughes		
1979	(Republic of Ireland) Eugene Hughes		
1980	(Republic of Ireland) Dessie Sheehan		
1981	(Republic of Ireland) A. Kearney		
1982	(Republic of Ireland) Paddy Browne		
1983	(Republic of Ireland) J. Long		
1984	(Republic of Ireland) Paul Ennis		
1985	(Republic of Ireland) Gay Burns	(Republic of Ireland) Ken Doherty	11–6
1986	(Republic of Ireland) Gay Burns	(Republic of Ireland) Damien McKiernan	8–3
1987	(Republic of Ireland) Ken Doherty	(Republic of Ireland) Richard Nolan	8–7
1988	(Republic of Ireland) John Buckley	(Republic of Ireland) Stephen Murphy	8–7
1989	(Republic of Ireland) Ken Doherty	(Republic of Ireland) Anthony O'Connor	8–5
1990	(Republic of Ireland) Stephen O'Connor	(Republic of Ireland) Richie McHugh	8–7
1991	(Republic of Ireland) Jason Watson	(Republic of Ireland) Joe Canny	8–5
1992	(Republic of Ireland) Jason Watson	(Republic of Ireland) Douglas Hogan	8–3
1993	(Republic of Ireland) Colm Gilcreest	(Republic of Ireland) Jason Watson	8–7
1994	(Republic of Ireland) Mick Kane	(Republic of Ireland) Tom Gleeson	8–4
1995	(Republic of Ireland) Tom Gleeson	(Republic of Ireland) Paul Ennis	8–5
1996	(Republic of Ireland) Joe Canny	(Republic of Ireland) Shay Clinton	8–1
1997	(Republic of Ireland) TJ Dowling	(Republic of Ireland) Garry Hardiman	8–6
1998	(Republic of Ireland) TJ Dowling	(Republic of Ireland) Douglas Hogan	8–3
1999	(Republic of Ireland) Joe Canny	(Republic of Ireland) Stanley Murphy	8–3
2000	(Republic of Ireland) Rodney Goggins	(Republic of Ireland) Garry Hardiman	8–7
2001	(Republic of Ireland) Martin McCrudden	(Republic of Ireland) Brendan O'Donoghue	8–5
2002	(Republic of Ireland) Jason Watson	(Republic of Ireland) Tom Gleeson	8–2
2003	(Republic of Ireland) Brendan O'Donoghue	(Republic of Ireland) Martin McCrudden	8–5
2004	(Republic of Ireland) David Morris	(Republic of Ireland) Rodney Goggins	8–4
2005	(Republic of Ireland) David Morris	(Republic of Ireland) Brendan O'Donoghue	8–2
2006	(Republic of Ireland) David Morris	(Republic of Ireland) Brendan O'Donoghue	8–2
2007	(Republic of Ireland) Vincent Muldoon	(Republic of Ireland) John Torpey	8–2
2008	(Republic of Ireland) Vincent Muldoon	(Republic of Ireland) Garry Hardiman	8–4
2009	(Republic of Ireland) Martin McCrudden	(Republic of Ireland) David Hogan	8–6
2010	(Republic of Ireland) Martin McCrudden	(Republic of Ireland) Vincent Muldoon	8–6
2011	(Republic of Ireland) Jason Devaney	(Republic of Ireland) David Hogan	8–6
2012	(Republic of Ireland) Vincent Muldoon	(Republic of Ireland) Martin McCrudden	10–5
2013	(Republic of Ireland) Michael Judge	(Republic of Ireland) Robert Redmond	8–5
2014	(Republic of Ireland) Martin McCrudden	(Republic of Ireland) Michael Judge	7–3
2015	(Republic of Ireland) Brendan O'Donoghue	(Republic of Ireland) Robert Murphy	7–2
2016	(Republic of Ireland) TJ Dowling	(Republic of Ireland) Jonathan Williams	7–3
2017	(Republic of Ireland) Brendan O'Donoghue	(Republic of Ireland) Rodney Goggins	7–3
2018	(Republic of Ireland) Michael Judge	(Republic of Ireland) Rodney Goggins	6–5
2019	(Republic of Ireland) David Morris	(Republic of Ireland) Josh Boileau	7–3
2020	Tournament Not Held		
2021	(Republic of Ireland) Brendan O'Donoghue	(Republic of Ireland) David Morris	6–5
2022	(Republic of Ireland) Brendan O'Donoghue	(Republic of Ireland) Ryan Cronin	7–4
2023	(Republic of Ireland) Brendan O'Donoghue	(Republic of Ireland) Ross Bulman	7–5
2024	(Republic of Ireland) Brendan O'Donoghue	(Republic of Ireland) Ross Bulman	7–5
2025	(Republic of Ireland) David Morris	(Republic of Ireland) Brendan O'Donoghue	7–1
