= 2006 Irish Professional Championship =

Irish Professional Championship
Tournament information
- Dates: 9–11 October 2006
- Venue: Spawell Sport & Leisure Complex
- City: Templeogue
- Country: Ireland
- Format: Non-Ranking event
- Winner's share: €7,000
- Highest break: (Republic of Ireland) Ken Doherty (140)

Final
- Champion: (Republic of Ireland) Ken Doherty
- Runner-up: (Republic of Ireland) Michael Judge
- Score: 9–4

The 2006 Irish Professional Championship was a professional invitational snooker tournament which took place in October 2006. The tournament was held at the Spawell Sport & Leisure Complex in Templeogue, and featured sixteen players exclusively from the Republic of Ireland and Northern Ireland.

The last-16 and quarter-final matches were played over the best of nine frames, the semi-finals best of eleven and the final best of seventeen. Ken Doherty won the event, beating Michael Judge 9–4 in the final.

== Main draw ==
Last 16; Best of 9 frames
(Republic of Ireland) Ken Doherty	5
(Republic of Ireland) Robert Murphy	0
(Republic of Ireland) Joe Delaney	5
(Northern Ireland) Alex Higgins	2
(Northern Ireland) Mark Allen	5
(Republic of Ireland) Gary Hardiman	1
(Northern Ireland) Gerard Greene	5
(Republic of Ireland) Brendan O'Donoghue	0
(Republic of Ireland) Michael Judge	5
(Republic of Ireland) Nigel Power	1
(Republic of Ireland) Fergal O'Brien	5
(Northern Ireland) Dermot McGlinchey	2
(Republic of Ireland) David Morris	5
(Republic of Ireland) Colm Gilcreest	3
(Northern Ireland) Joe Swail	5
(Republic of Ireland) Martin McCrudden	2

Quarter-finals; Best of 9 frames
(Republic of Ireland) Ken Doherty	5
(Republic of Ireland) Joe Delaney	4
(Northern Ireland) Mark Allen	5
(Northern Ireland) Gerard Greene	3
(Republic of Ireland) Michael Judge	5
(Republic of Ireland) Fergal O'Brien	1
(Republic of Ireland) David Morris	5
(Northern Ireland) Joe Swail	4

Semi-finals; Best of 11 frames
(Republic of Ireland) Ken Doherty	6
(Northern Ireland) Mark Allen	2
(Republic of Ireland) Michael Judge	6
(Republic of Ireland) David Morris	1

Final; Best of 17 frames
(Republic of Ireland) Ken Doherty	9
(Republic of Ireland) Michael Judge	4

== Century breaks ==
- 140, 131, 116 – Ken Doherty
- 132 – David Morris
- 129 – Joe Delaney
- 105 – Michael Judge
- 104 – Fergal O'Brien
