= 2009 World Championships =

2009 World Championships may refer to:

- Alpine skiing: Alpine World Ski Championships 2009
- Aquatics: 2009 World Aquatics Championships
- Athletics: 2009 World Championships in Athletics
  - Cross-country running: 2009 IAAF World Cross Country Championships
  - Half marathon: 2009 IAAF World Half Marathon Championships
- Badminton: 2009 BWF World Championships
- Boxing: 2009 World Amateur Boxing Championships
- Curling:
  - 2009 Ford World Men's Curling Championship
  - 2009 World Women's Curling Championship
- Darts:
  - 2009 BDO World Darts Championship
  - 2009 PDC World Darts Championship
- Fencing: 2009 World Fencing Championships
- Figure skating: 2009 World Figure Skating Championships
- Gymnastics
  - Artistic Gymnastics 2009 World Artistic Gymnastics Championships
  - Rhythmic Gymnastics 2009 World Rhythmic Gymnastics Championships
- Freestyle skiing: FIS Freestyle World Ski Championships 2009
- Handball:
  - 2009 World Men's Handball Championship
  - 2009 World Women's Handball Championship
- Ice hockey:
  - 2009 Men's World Ice Hockey Championships
  - 2009 Women's World Ice Hockey Championships
- Nordic skiing: FIS Nordic World Ski Championships 2009
- Speed skating
  - Allround: 2009 World Allround Speed Skating Championships
  - Sprint: 2009 World Sprint Speed Skating Championships
  - Single distances: 2009 World Single Distance Speed Skating Championships
- Six-red snooker: 2009 Six-red World Championship
- Snooker: 2009 World Snooker Championship
- Table tennis: 2009 World Table Tennis Championships

== See also ==
- 2009 World Cup (disambiguation)
- 2009 Continental Championships (disambiguation)
- 2009 World Junior Championships (disambiguation)
