= 2009 Six-red World Championship =

Six-red World Championship

Tournament information
- Dates: 14–18 December 2009
- Venue: INEC
- City: Killarney
- Country: Ireland
- Winner's share: €10,000
- Highest break: 78

Final
- Champion: (England) Mark Davis
- Runner-up: (Wales) Mark Williams
- Score: 6–3

The 2009 Six-red World Championship (styled the 888sport.com 6Red World Championship, among other spellings, for sponsorship and marketing purposes) was a six-red snooker tournament that took place between 14 and 18 December 2009 at the INEC in Killarney, Ireland. The tournament was sponsored by online bookmaker 888sport.

The field of 118 players were divided into twenty groups of five and three groups of six. Twenty-eight competitors were on the 2009/2010 professional Main Tour. During the tournament Michael White compiled the fastest 75 maximum break in the group stage with 2 minutes and 28 seconds.

Mark Davis won in the final 6–3 against Mark Williams.

== Group stage ==
Group A

POS	Player	MP	MW	FW	FL	FD	PTS
1	(Brazil) Igor Figueiredo	4	3	14	4	+10	3
2	(England) Ricky Walden	4	3	15	7	+8	3
3	(Northern Ireland) Declan Brennan	4	3	12	9	+3	3
4	(Republic of Ireland) Martin Divilly	4	1	6	14	−8	1
5	(Republic of Ireland) Kevin Bowman	4	0	3	16	−13	0

- Declan Brennan 4–1 Martin Divilly
- Igor Figerideo 4–0 Kevin Bowman
- Ricky Walden 4–0 Kevin Bowman
- Ricky Walden 3–4 Declan Brennan
- Igor Figueiredo 4–0 Martin Divilly
- Martin Divilly 4–2 Kevin Bowman
- Igor Figueiredo 4–0 Declan Brennan
- Ricky Walden 4–1 Martin Divilly
- Declan Brennan 4–1 Kevin Bowman
- Ricky Walden 4–2 Igor Figueiredo

Group B

POS	Player	MP	MW	FW	FL	FD	PTS
1	(India) Aditya Mehta	4	4	16	6	+8	4
2	(England) Reanne Evans	4	3	14	8	+6	3
3	(Scotland) John Higgins	4	2	14	10	+4	2
4	(Northern Ireland) Aaron Doran	4	1	7	15	−8	1
5	(Republic of Ireland) James Corbett	4	0	4	16	−12	0

- Reanne Evans 4–1 Aaron Doran
- Aditya Mehta 4–0 James Corbett
- John Higgins 4–1 James Corbett
- Reanne Evans 4–3 John Higgins
- Aditya Mehta 4–1 Aaron Doran
- Reanne Evans 4–0 James Corbett
- Aaron Doran 1–4 John Higgins
- Aditya Mehta 4–2 Reanne Evans
- John Higgins 3–4 Aditya Mehta
- Aaron Doran 4–3 James Corbett

Group C

POS	Player	MP	MW	FW	FL	FD	PTS
1	(Wales) Jamie Jones	4	4	16	3	+13	4
2	(Republic of Ireland) David Morris	4	3	12	7	+5	3
3	(Republic of Ireland) John Torpey	4	2	11	10	+1	2
4	(Republic of Ireland) Daniel Dempsey	4	1	7	12	−5	1
5	(Egypt) Adel Omar Meawad	4	0	2	16	−14	0

- John Torpey 4–2 Daniel Dempsey
- Jamie Jones 4–2 Adel Omar Meawad
- Jamie Jones 4–0 Daniel Dempsey
- David Morris 4–2 John Torpey
- David Morris 4–0 Adel Omar Meawad
- Jamie Jones 4–1 John Torpey
- David Morris 4–1 Daniel Dempsey
- John Torpey 4–0 Adel Omar Meawad
- Jamie Jones 4–0 David Morris
- Daniel Dempsey 4–0 Adel Omar Meawad

Group D

POS	Player	MP	MW	FW	FL	FD	PTS
1	(Wales) Ryan Day	5	5	20	4	+16	5
2	(Wales) Gareth Allen	5	4	17	6	+11	4
3	(Republic of Ireland) Mario Fernandez	5	3	14	9	+4	3
4	(Republic of Ireland) Robbie Walker	5	2	10	12	−2	2
5	(Republic of Ireland) Gavin Stokes	5	1	6	16	−10	1
6	(England) John Coxes	5	0	0	20	−20	0

- Gareth Allen 4–0 John Coxes
- Mario Fernandez 4–0 Gavin Stokes
- Ryan Day 4–1 Robbie Walker
- Mario Fernandez 4–0 John Coxes
- Ryan Day 4–1 Gareth Allen
- Mario Fernandez 4–1 Robbie Walker
- Ryan Day 4–1 Gavin Stokes
- Ryan Day 4–0 John Coxes
- Gareth Allen 4–1 Gavin Stokes
- Gavin Stokes 4–0 John Coxes
- Gareth Allen 4–0 Robbie Walker
- Ryan Day 4–1 Mario Fernandez
- Robbie Walker 4–0 Gavin Stokes
- Gareth Allen 4–1 Mario Fernandez

Group E

POS	Player	MP	MW	FW	FL	FD	PTS
1	(England) Liam Highfield	4	3	14	7	+7	3
2	(Hong Kong) Marco Fu	4	3	13	8	+5	3
3	(United Arab Emirates) Eissa Al Sayed	4	3	13	12	+1	3
4	(Republic of Ireland) Clinton Franey	4	1	10	14	−4	1
5	(Republic of Ireland) Michael Bumster	4	0	7	16	−9	0

- Clinton Franey 4–2 Michael Bumster
- Liam Highfield 2–4 Eissa Al Sayed
- Marco Fu 4–1 Clinton Franey
- Esissa Al Sayed 4–0 Michael Bumster
- Marco Fu 1–4 Liam Highfield
- Liam Highfield 4–0 Michael Bumster
- Eissa al Sayed 4–3 Clinton Franey
- Marco Fu 4–2 Michael Bumster
- Marco Fu 4–1 Eissa Al Sayed
- Liam Highfield 4–2 Clinton Franey

Group F

POS	Player	MP	MW	FW	FL	FD	PTS
1	(Scotland) Stephen Hendry	4	4	16	5	+11	4
2	(India) Lucky Vatnani	4	3	15	8	+7	3
3	(Brazil) Itaro Santos	4	2	13	10	+3	2
4	(Republic of Ireland) Shea Brereton	4	1	7	12	−5	1
5	(Republic of Ireland) Patrick Lally	4	0	0	16	−16	0

- Itaro Santos 4–0 Patrick Lally
- Shea Brereton 0–4 Stephen Hendry
- Lucky Vatnani 4–3 Itaro Santos
- Stephen Hendry 4–3 Lucky Vatnani
- Shea Brereton 4–0 Patrick Lally
- Lucky Vatnani 4–0 Patrick Lally
- Itaro Santos 4–2 Shea Brereton
- Stephen Hendry 4–0 Patrick Lally
- Stephen Hendry 4–2 Itaro Santos
- Lucky Vatnani 4–1 Shea Brereton

Group G

POS	Player	MP	MW	FW	FL	FD	PTS
1	(England) Mark Joyce	4	4	16	4	+12	4
2	(United Arab Emirates) Mohammed Shehab	4	3	14	7	+7	3
3	(Pakistan) Muhammad Atiq	4	2	13	8	+5	2
4	(Republic of Ireland) Raymond McHugh	4	1	4	12	−8	1
5	(Republic of Ireland) Sean MacMonagle	4	0	0	16	−16	0

- Mohamed Shehab 4–0 Sean McGonagle
- Mark Joyce 4–2 Muhammed Atiq
- Sean McGonagle 0–4 Raymond McHugh
- Mark Joyce 4–2 Mohammed Shehab
- Muhammed Atiq 4–0 Raymond McHugh
- Muhammed Atiq 4–0 Sean McGonagle
- Mohammed Shehab 4–0 Raymond McHugh
- Mark Joyce 4–0 Sean McGonagle
- Mohammed Shehab 4–3 Muhammed Atiq
- Mark Joyce 4–0 Raymond McHugh

Group H

POS	Player	MP	MW	FW	FL	FD	PTS
1	(England) Joe Perry	4	4	16	3	+13	4
2	(Republic of Ireland) Robert Murphy	4	3	12	6	+6	3
3	(United Arab Emirates) Mohammed Al Joker	4	2	13	9	+4	2
4	(England) Oliver Brown	4	1	5	12	−7	1
5	(Republic of Ireland) Kevin O'Leary	4	0	0	16	−16	0

- Joe Perry 4–0 Oliver Brown
- Robert Murphy 4–0 Kevin O'Leary
- Oliver Brown 4–0 Kevin O'Leary
- Joe Perry 4–3 Mohammed Al Joker
- Mohammed Al Joker 2–4 Robert Murphy
- Mohammed Al Joker 4–0 Kevin O'Leary
- Joe Perry 4–0 Robert Murphy
- Mohammed Al Joker 4–1 Oliver Brown
- Joe Perry 4–0 Kevin O'Leary
- Oliver Brown 0–4 Robert Murphy

Group I

POS	Player	MP	MW	FW	FL	FD	PTS
1	(England) Mark King	5	5	20	2	+18	5
2	(Wales) Andrew Pagett	5	4	18	6	+12	4
3	(England) Mike Hallett	5	3	13	11	+2	3
4	(Republic of Ireland) Darren Merza	5	2	11	12	−1	2
5	(Republic of Ireland) David Foran	5	1	5	16	−11	1
6	(Republic of Ireland) Alan Cleary	5	0	0	20	−20	0

- Andrew Pagett 4–0 David Foran
- Mark King 4–0 Alan Cleary
- Mark King 4–0 David Foran
- Andrew Pagett 4–1 Darren Merza
- Mark King 4–0 Mike Hallett
- Mike Hallett 4–2 Darren Merza
- David Foran 4–0 Alan Cleary
- Darren Merza 4–0 Alan Cleary
- Andrew Pagett 4–1 Mike Hallett
- Andrew Pagett 4–0 Alan Cleary
- Darren Merza 4–0 David Foran
- Mike Hallett 4–1 David Foran
- Mark King 4–0 Darren Merza
- Mike Hallett 4–0 Alan Cleary
- Mark King 4–2 Andrew Pagett

Group J

POS	Player	MP	MW	FW	FL	FD	PTS
1	(Wales) Mark Williams	4	4	16	6	+10	4
2	(Republic of Ireland) Leo Fernandez	4	3	12	6	+6	3
3	(England) Ian Glover	4	2	14	12	+2	2
4	(Republic of Ireland) Joe Corrigan	4	1	12	15	−3	1
5	(Republic of Ireland) Dane Mulpeter	4	0	5	16	−11	0

- Leo Fernandez 4–0 Dane Mulpeter
- Ian Glover 4–3 Joe Corrigan
- Mark Williams 4–1 Dane Mulpeter
- Mark Williams 4–3 Ian Glover
- Leo Fernandez 4–3 Joe Corrigan
- Mark Williams 4–2 Joe Corrigan
- Ian Glover 4–1 Dane Mulpeter
- Joe Corrigan 4–3 Dane Mulpeter
- Mark Williams 4–0 Leo Fernandez
- Leo Fernandez 4–3 Ian Glover

Group L

POS	Player	MP	MW	FW	FL	FD	PTS
1	(England) Barry Hawkins	4	4	16	4	+12	4
2	(Republic of Ireland) Vincent Muldoon	4	3	14	8	+6	3
3	(Northern Ireland) Michael Smyth	4	2	9	14	−5	2
4	(Republic of Ireland) Brendan Thomas	4	1	9	13	−4	1
5	(England) Paul Mount	4	0	7	16	−9	0

- Vincent Muldoon 4–1 Paul Mount
- Michael Smyth 4–3 Brendan Thomas
- Barry Hawkins 4–2 Paul Mount
- Barry Hawkins 4–0 Michael Smyth
- Vincent Muldoon 4–2 Brendan Thomas
- Barry Hawkins 4–0 Brendan Thomas
- Michael Smyth 4–3 Paul Mount
- Vincent Muldoon 4–1 Michael Smyth
- Brendan Thomas 4–1 Paul Mount
- Barry Hawkins 4–2 Vincent Muldoon

Group M

POS	Player	MP	MW	FW	FL	FD	PTS
1	(England) Jamie Cope	4	4	16	1	+15	4
2	(England) Adam Duffy	4	3	13	6	+7	3
3	(England) Philip Wildman	4	2	10	9	+1	2
4	(Republic of Ireland) Damien Long	4	1	5	15	+10	1
5	(Republic of Ireland) David Cassidy	4	0	3	16	−13	0

- David Cassidy 3–4 Damien Long
- Adam Duffy 4–3 Philip Wildman
- David Cassidy 0–4 Jamie Cope
- Philip Wildman 4–1 Damien Long
- Jamie Cope 4–1 Adam Duffy
- Adam Duffy 4–0 Damian Long
- Philip Wildman 4–0 David Cassidy
- Jamie Cope 4–0 Damien Long
- Adam Duffy 4–0 David Cassidy
- Jamie Cope 4–0 Philip Wildman

Group N

POS	Player	MP	MW	FW	FL	FD	PTS
1	(Republic of Ireland) Stephen Sherry	4	3	14	6	+8	3
2	(England) Dave Harold	4	3	14	6	+8	3
3	(England) Mitchell Mann	4	3	13	7	+6	3
4	(Republic of Ireland) Joseph McClaren	4	1	6	13	−7	1
5	(Republic of Ireland) Chris Kilcoyle	4	0	1	16	−15	0

- Mitchell Mann 4–0 Chris Kilcoyle
- Stephen Sherry 4–2 Dave Harold
- Mitchell Mann 4–1 Joseph McClaren
- Joseph McClaren 1–4 Dave Harold
- Chris Kilcoyne 0–4 Stephen Sherry
- Mitchell Mann 4–2 Stephen Sherry
- Joseph McClaren 4–1 Chris Kilcoyle
- Dave Harold 4–0 Chris Kilcoyle
- Joseph McClaren 0–4 Stephen Sherry
- Dave Harold 4–1 Mitchell Mann

Group P

POS	Player	MP	MW	FW	FL	FD	PTS
1	(England) Stuart Bingham	4	4	16	6	+10	4
2	(Republic of Ireland) Brendan O'Donoghue	4	3	15	7	+8	3
3	(England) Neil Craycraft	4	2	11	9	+2	2
4	(Republic of Ireland) James Fennessy	4	1	7	12	−5	1
5	(Pakistan) Mohammed Siddiq	4	0	1	16	−15	0

- Neil Craycraft 4–1 Muhammed Siddiq
- James Fennessy 2–4 Stuart Bingham
- Stuart Bingham 4–3 Brendan O'Donoghue
- Brendan O'Donoghue 4–2 Neil Craycraft
- Brendan O'Donoghue 4–0 Muhammed Siddiq
- Neil Craycraft 4–0 James Fennessy
- Stuart Bingham 4–1 Neil Craycraft
- Brendan O'Donoghue 4–1 James Fennessy
- Stuart Bingham 4–0 Muhammed Siddiq
- Muhammed Siddiq 0–4 James Fennessy

Group Q

POS	Player	MP	MW	FW	FL	FD	PTS
1	(Northern Ireland) Joe Swail	4	4	16	5	+11	4
2	(Wales) Michael White	4	2	14	10	+4	2
3	(Scotland) John Rea	4	2	11	9	+2	2
4	(Republic of Ireland) Philip Burke	4	2	10	13	−3	2
5	(Republic of Ireland) Ernie McMullan	4	0	2	16	−14	0

- John Rea 4–1 Philip Burke
- Joe Swail 4–2 Ernie McMullen
- Michael White 3–4 Philip Burke
- Michael White 4–0 Ernie McMullan
- Joe Swail 4–2 John Rea
- Philip Burke 4–2 Ernie McMullen
- Michael White 4–2 John Rea
- John Rea 4–0 Ernie McMullen
- Joe Swail 4–1 Philip Burke
- Joe Swail 4–3 Michael White

Group R

POS	Player	MP	MW	FW	FL	FD	PTS
1	(England) Michael Holt	4	4	16	3	+13	4
2	(Republic of Ireland) David Hogan	4	3	15	9	+6	3
3	(England) Alex O'Donoghue	4	2	9	8	+1	2
4	(Northern Ireland) Alex Higgins	4	1	6	12	−6	1
5	(Scotland) Jim Stewart	4	0	2	16	−14	0

- David Hogan 4–2 Jim Stewart
- Alex Higgins 0–4 Alex O'Donoghue
- Michael Holt 4–0 Jim Stewart
- Michael Holt 4–0 Alex Higgins
- David Hogan 4–1 Alex O'Donoghue
- Michael Holt 4–0 Alex O'Donoghue
- Alex Higgins 4–0 Jim Stewart
- David Hogan 4–2 Alex Higgins
- Alex O'Donoghue 4–0 Jim Stewart
- Michael Holt 4–3 David Hogan

Group S

POS	Player	MP	MW	FW	FL	FD	PTS
1	(England) Stephen Lee	4	4	16	4	+12	4
2	(England) Michael Wasley	4	3	14	7	+7	3
3	(Republic of Ireland) Anthony O'Connor	4	2	10	13	−3	2
4	(Republic of Ireland) Karl Ellis	4	1	8	12	−4	1
5	(Northern Ireland) Hugh Murdock	4	0	4	16	−12	0

- Anthony O'Connor 4–2 Karl Ellis
- Stephen Lee 4–2 Michael Wasley
- Anthony O'Connor 4–3 Hugh Murdock
- Michael Wasley 4–0 Hugh Murdock
- Stephen Lee 4–1 Karl Ellis
- Anthony O'Connor 2–4 Michael Wasley
- Stephen Lee 4–1 Hugh Murdock
- Michael Wasley 4–1 Karl Ellis
- Hugh Murdock 0–4 Karl Ellis
- Stephen Lee 4–0 Anthony O'Connor

Group T

POS	Player	MP	MW	FW	FL	FD	PTS
1	(Wales) Matthew Stevens	4	4	16	6	+10	4
2	(Republic of Ireland) Philip Browne	4	3	14	9	+5	3
3	(Northern Ireland) Darren Dornan	5	2	11	10	+1	2
4	(Scotland) Marc Davis	5	1	12	15	−3	1
5	(Republic of Ireland) Gary Walsh	5	0	3	16	−13	0

- Darren Dornan 4–0 Gary Walsh
- Marc Davis 3–4 Philip Browne
- Darren Dornan 2–4 Philip Browne
- Matthew Stevens 4–3 Marc Davis
- Matthew Stevens 4–0 Gary Walsh
- Matthew Stevens 4–2 Philip Browne
- Marc Davis 4–3 Gary Walsh
- Philip Browne 4–0 Gary Walsh
- Matthew Stevens 4–1 Darren Dornan
- Darren Dornan 4–2 Marc Davis

Group V

POS	Player	MP	MW	FW	FL	FD	PTS
1	(England) Robert Milkins	4	4	16	3	+13	4
2	(England) Nigel Bond	4	3	14	4	+10	3
3	(Belgium) Peter Bullen	4	2	9	10	−1	2
4	(England) Gennaro Delvecchio	4	1	6	15	−9	1
5	(Republic of Ireland) Ray Power	4	0	3	16	−13	0

- Peter Bullen 4–0 Ray Power
- Nigel Bond 4–0 Gennaro Delvecchio
- Robert Milkins 4–1 Peter Bullen
- Nigel Bond 2–4 Robert Milkins
- Gennaro Delvecchio 4–3 Ray Power
- Peter Bullen 4–2 Gennaro Delvecchio
- Robert Milkins 4–0 Ray Power
- Nigel Bond 4–0 Ray Power
- Nigel Bond 4–0 Peter Bullen
- Robert Milkins 4–0 Gennaro Delvecchio

Group W

POS	Player	MP	MW	FW	FL	FD	PTS
1	(England) Barry Pinches	4	4	16	4	+12	4
2	(Republic of Ireland) Jason Waters	4	3	13	5	+8	3
3	(Scotland) Ross Higgins	4	1	8	13	−5	1
4	(Republic of Ireland) Shane O'Mahoney	4	1	9	15	−6	1
5	(Republic of Ireland) Brendan Murphy	4	0	7	16	−9	0

- Shane O'Mahoney 3–4 Ross Higgins
- Jason Waters 1–4 Barry Pinches
- Barry Pinches 4–2 Shane O'Mahoney
- Jason Waters 4–1 Brendan Murphy
- Jason Waters 4–0 Ross Higgins
- Shane O'Mahoney 4–3 Brendan Murphy
- Barry Pinches 4–0 Ross Higgins
- Jason Waters 4–0 Shane O'Mahoney
- Ross Higgins 4–2 Brendan Murphy
- Barry Pinches 4–1 Brendan Murphy

Group X

POS	Player	MP	MW	FW	FL	FD	PTS
1	(England) Mark Davis	4	4	16	4	+12	4
2	(Northern Ireland) Gerard Greene	4	3	15	9	+6	3
3	(Republic of Ireland) Richie Flynn	4	1	9	13	−4	1
4	(England) Greg Batten	4	1	9	14	−5	1
5	(Republic of Ireland) Joe Charles	4	1	6	15	−9	1

- Richie Flynn 2–4 Gerard Greene
- Greg Batten 4–2 Joe Charles
- Richie Flynn 3–4 Joe Charles
- Gerard Greene 3–4 Mark Davis
- Mark Davis 4–1 Greg Batten
- Mark Davis 4–0 Joe Charles
- Mark Davis 4–0 Richie Flynn
- Gerard Greene 4–3 Greg Batten
- Mark Davis 4–3 Gerard Greene
- Richie Flynn 4–1 Greg Batten

Group Y

POS	Player	MP	MW	FW	FL	FD	PTS
1	(Scotland) Marcus Campbell	4	4	16	1	+15	4
2	(Northern Ireland) Kieran McMahon	4	3	13	5	+8	3
3	(England) Kieran O'Leary	4	2	9	10	−1	2
4	(Republic of Ireland) John Lynch	4	1	6	12	−6	1
5	(Republic of Ireland) Imran Faood	4	0	0	16	−16	0

- Kieran McMahon 4–1 Kieran O'Leary
- John Lynch 4–0 Imran Faood
- Marcus Campbell 4–0 Imran Faood
- Marcus Campbell 4–1 Kieran McMahon
- John Lynch 2–4 Kieran O'Leary
- Kieran McMahon 4–0 John Lynch
- Kieran O'Leary 0–4 Marcus Campbell
- Kieran McMahon 4–0 Imran Faood
- Marcus Campbell 4–0 John Lynch
- Kieran O'Leary 4–0 Imran Faood

Group Z

POS	Player	MP	MW	FW	FL	FD	PTS
1	(Republic of Ireland) Ken Doherty	5	5	20	3	+17	5
2	(Republic of Ireland) Leonard Shanahan	5	4	16	9	+7	4
3	(Republic of Ireland) John McBride	5	2	14	13	+1	2
4	(Israel) Shachar Ruberg	5	2	10	12	−2	2
5	(England) Lewis Miles	5	2	11	16	−5	2
6	(England) Lee Gorton	5	0	2	20	−18	0

- Shachur Ruberg 4–0 Lewis Miles
- Ken Doherty 4–1 John McBride
- Leonard Shanahan 4–0 Lee Gorton
- Ken Doherty 4–0 Lee Gorton
- Leonard Shanahan 4–2 John McBride
- Shachur Ruberg 0–4 John McBride
- Ken Doherty 4–0 Shachaur Ruberg
- Leonard Shanahan 4–1 Lewis Miles
- Lewis Miles 4–1 Lee Gorton
- Ken Doherty 4–0 Leonard Shanahan
- John McBride 4–1 Lee Gorton
- Ken Doherty 4–2 Lewis Miles
- Leonard Shanahan 4–2 Shachur Ruberg
- Lewis Miles 4–3 John McBride
- Shachur Ruberg 4–0 Lee Gorton

== Knock-out stage ==
=== Top half ===
==== Section 1 ====
Preliminary Round; Best of 9 frames
(England) Neil Craycraft	5
(Republic of Ireland) John Torpey	2

Last 64; Best of 9 frames
(Scotland) Marcus Campbell	5
(England) Neil Craycraft	0
(United Arab Emirates) Mohammed Shehab	2
(Scotland) Stephen Hendry	5
(Northern Ireland) Gerard Greene	4
(England) Barry Hawkins	5
(Scotland) John Rea	0
(England) Stephen Lee	5

Last 32; Best of 9 frames
(Scotland) Marcus Campbell	5
(Scotland) Stephen Hendry	2
(England) Barry Hawkins	5
(England) Stephen Lee	4

Last 16; Best of 9 frames
(Scotland) Marcus Campbell	2
(England) Barry Hawkins	5

==== Section 2 ====
Preliminary Round; Best of 9 frames
(Belgium) Peter Bullen	5
(Republic of Ireland) Richie Flynn	2

Last 64; Best of 9 frames
(Northern Ireland) Kieran McMahon	3
(England) Reanne Evans	5
(Republic of Ireland) Leonard Shanahan	2
(Wales) Andrew Pagett	5
(Northern Ireland) Declan Brennan	1
(Wales) Ryan Day	5
(Belgium) Peter Bullen	2
(England) Joe Perry	5

Last 32; Best of 9 frames
(England) Reanne Evans	2
(Wales) Andrew Pagett	5
(Wales) Ryan Day	5
(England) Joe Perry	2

Last 16; Best of 9 frames
(Wales) Andrew Pagett	1
(Wales) Ryan Day	5

==== Section 3 ====
Preliminary Round; Best of 9 frames
(England) Mike Hallett	3
(England) Philip Wildman	5

Last 64; Best of 9 frames
(England) Michael Holt	1
(England) Philip Wildman	5
(Pakistan) Muhammad Atiq	2
(Republic of Ireland) Jason Waters	5
(Wales) Michael White	4
(England) Liam Highfield	5
(Republic of Ireland) John McBride	0
(Wales) Mark Williams	5

Last 32; Best of 9 frames
(England) Philip Wildman	0
(Republic of Ireland) Jason Waters	5
(England) Liam Highfield	2
(Wales) Mark Williams	5

Last 16; Best of 9 frames
(Republic of Ireland) Jason Waters	1
(Wales) Mark Williams	5

==== Section 4 ====
Preliminary Round; Best of 9 frames
(Republic of Ireland) Darren Merza	5
(Scotland) Ross Higgins	2

Last 64; Best of 9 frames
(Republic of Ireland) David Morris	2
(India) Aditya Mehta	5
(England) Mitchell Mann	2
(Wales) Matthew Stevens	5
(England) Adam Duffy	5
(England) Dave Harold	3
(Republic of Ireland) Darren Merza	0
(Republic of Ireland) Ken Doherty	5

Last 32; Best of 9 frames
(India) Aditya Mehta	5
(Wales) Matthew Stevens	2
(England) Adam Duffy	5
(Republic of Ireland) Ken Doherty	4

Last 16; Best of 9 frames
(India) Aditya Mehta	2
(England) Adam Duffy	5

=== Bottom half ===
==== Section 5 ====
Preliminary Round; Best of 9 frames
(Northern Ireland) Darren Dornan	5
(Republic of Ireland) Robbie Walker	3

Last 64; Best of 9 frames
(England) Mark King	'5
(Northern Ireland) Darren Dornan	1
(Republic of Ireland) Robert Murphy	1
(India) Lucky Vatnani	5
(Hong Kong) Marco Fu	4
(England) Ricky Walden	5
(England) Ian Glover	5
(Republic of Ireland) Brendan O'Donoghue	0

Last 32; Best of 9 frames
(England) Mark King	5
(India) Lucky Vatnani	3
(England) Ricky Walden	4
(England) Ian Glover	5

Last 16; Best of 9 frames
(England) Mark King	5
(England) Ian Glover	0

==== Section 6 ====
Preliminary Round; Best of 9 frames
(United Arab Emirates) Eissa Al Sayed	2
(England) Alex O'Donoghue	5

Last 64; Best of 9 frames
(Republic of Ireland) Vincent Muldoon	5
(Wales) Gareth Allen	3
(Republic of Ireland) Leo Fernandez	3
(England) Nigel Bond	5
(Scotland) John Higgins	5
(Republic of Ireland) Stephen Sherry	1
(England) Alex O'Donoghue	2
(England) Robert Milkins	5

Last 32; Best of 9 frames
(Republic of Ireland) Vincent Muldoon	3
(England) Nigel Bond	5
(Scotland) John Higgins	5
(England) Robert Milkins	2

Last 16; Best of 9 frames
(England) Nigel Bond	2
(Scotland) John Higgins	5

==== Section 7 ====
Preliminary Round; Best of 9 frames
(Israel) Shachar Ruberg	5
(Northern Ireland) Michael Smyth	2

Last 64; Best of 9 frames
(Wales) Jamie Jones	5
(Israel) Shachar Ruberg	2
(Republic of Ireland) Mario Fernandez	5
(England) Stuart Bingham	4
(United Arab Emirates) Mohammed Al Joker	0
(Northern Ireland) Joe Swail	5
(England) Oliver Brown	2
(Brazil) Igor Figueiredo	5

Last 32; Best of 9 frames
(Wales) Jamie Jones	2
(Republic of Ireland) Mario Fernandez	5
(Northern Ireland) Joe Swail	5
(Brazil) Igor Figueiredo	0

Last 16; Best of 9 frames
(Republic of Ireland) Mario Fernandez	3
(Northern Ireland) Joe Swail	5

==== Section 8 ====
Preliminary Round; Best of 9 frames
(Republic of Ireland) Anthony O'Connor	5
(England) Kieran O'Leary	2

Last 64; Best of 9 frames
(Brazil) Itaro Santos	5
(England) Barry Pinches	3
(England) Mark Joyce	5
(Republic of Ireland) David Hogan	1
(England) Mark Davis	5
(England) Michael Wasley	0
(Republic of Ireland) Anthony O'Connor	1
(England) Jamie Cope	5

Last 32; Best of 9 frames
(Brazil) Itaro Santos	2
(England) Mark Joyce	5
(England) Mark Davis	5
(England) Jamie Cope	2

Last 16; Best of 9 frames
(England) Mark Joyce	3
(England) Mark Davis	5

=== Finals ===
Quarter-finals; Best of 9 frames
(England) Barry Hawkins	5
(Wales) Ryan Day	2
(Wales) Mark Williams	5
(England) Adam Duffy	4
(England) Mark King	5
(Scotland) John Higgins	1
(Northern Ireland) Joe Swail	1
(England) Mark Davis	5

Semi-finals; Best of 9 frames
(England) Barry Hawkins	1
(Wales) Mark Williams	5
(England) Mark King	3
(England) Mark Davis	5

Final; Best of 11 frames
(Wales) Mark Williams	3
(England) Mark Davis	6

== Notable breaks ==
=== Maximum breaks ===
(Note: a maximum break in six-reds is 75 points.)

- Michael White (2 minutes 28 seconds)^{[a]}
- Mark King (3 minutes 12 seconds)
- David Morris (3 minutes 25 seconds)
- Ken Doherty (3 minutes 28 seconds)
- John Higgins (3 minutes 38 seconds)
- Mark Joyce (4 minutes 44 seconds)
- Barry Pinches (4 minutes 53 seconds)

=== Seven-red clearances ===
- 78 points Ricky Walden
- 76 points Robert Milkins (4 minutes 18 seconds)
- 75 points Mark King (3 minutes 12 seconds)

== Notes ==
- ^{a} Michael White compiled the fastest maximum break in six-red snooker, it took 2 minutes and 28 seconds.
