= 2009 World Junior Championships =

2009 World Junior Championships may refer to:

- Figure skating: 2009 World Junior Figure Skating Championships
- Ice hockey: 2009 World Junior Ice Hockey Championships
- Ringette: 2009 World Junior Ringette Championships
- Motorcycle speedway:
  - 2009 Individual Speedway Junior World Championship
  - 2009 Team Speedway Junior World Championship

== See also ==
- 2009 World Cup (disambiguation)
- 2009 Continental Championships (disambiguation)
- 2009 World Championships (disambiguation)
