= Rodney Goggins =

Irish snooker player

Personal information
- Born: 25 March 1978 (age 48) Wexford, Ireland

Sport
- Country: Ireland
- Sport: Snooker
- Professional: 2004/2005, 2007–2009
- Highest ranking: 70 (2008/2009)
- Best ranking finish: Last 64 (x3)

Rodney Goggins (born 25 March 1978) is an Irish former professional snooker player from County Wexford. He competed on the main tour between 2004 and 2009.

== Career ==
At the age of 21, Goggins won the International Billiards and Snooker Federation World Under-21 Championship in 1999, when he beat Rolf de Jong of the Netherlands 11–4 in the final in Egypt.

Two last-32 finishes in qualifying events during the 2003–2004 season earned Goggins a place on the professional main tour for 2004–2005. That season, his best performance was a run to the last 64 at the 2005 Irish Masters, where he beat Shokat Ali and Bjorn Haneveer, both 5–2, before losing by the same scoreline to Dave Harold. Goggins finished the season ranked 90th, and lost his place on tour.

Having finished first in the Irish senior rankings for 2006–2007, Goggins returned to the professional game in 2007. That season brought progress to the last 64 at the 2007 UK Championship, with victories over Alex Davies and Judd Trump before a 3–9 defeat to David Gray. In the 2008 World Championship, he beat Ian Barry Stark and Lee Spick, but lost 4–10 to Trump at the last-80 stage.

Goggins' fortunes did not improve the following season; again, the last 64 at the UK Championship was his best performance, being defeated 3–9 by Gerard Greene. He concluded the season ranked 70th, a career-highest, but as only the top 64 automatically retained their places on tour, he was relegated as a result.

In 2018 he was runner up to Michael Judge in the Irish Amateur Championships.

== Performance and rankings timeline ==
Tournament	2003/ 04	2004/ 05	2005/ 06	2007/ 08	2008/ 09	2012/ 13	2022/ 23
Ranking (Note: It shows the ranking at the beginning of the season)	(Note: He was an amateur)	(Note: New players on the Main Tour don't have a ranking)			70		
Ranking tournaments
European Masters (Note: The event was called the European Open (2003/2004) and the Malta Cup (2004/2005-2005/2006 and 2007/2008))	A	LQ	A	NR	Not Held		A
British Open	A	LQ	Tournament Not Held				A
UK Championship	A	LQ	A	LQ	LQ	A	A
World Grand Prix	Tournament Not Held						DNQ
Welsh Open	A	LQ	A	LQ	LQ	A	A
Players Championship (Note: The event was called the Players Tour Championship Grand Final (2012/2013))	Tournament Not Held					DNQ	DNQ
Tour Championship	Tournament Not Held						DNQ
World Championship	LQ	LQ	A	LQ	LQ	A	A
Non-ranking tournaments
Six-red World Championship (Note: The event was called the Six-red Snooker International (2008/2009))	Tournament Not Held				A	2R	LQ
Former ranking tournaments
Irish Masters	A	LQ	Tournament Not Held				
Northern Ireland Trophy	Not Held		NR	LQ	LQ	Not Held	
Bahrain Championship	Tournament Not Held				LQ	Not Held	
Shanghai Masters	Tournament Not Held			LQ	LQ	A	NH
World Open (Note: The event was called the LG Cup (2003/2004) and the Grand Prix (2004/2005-2005/2006 and 2007/2008-2008/2009))	A	LQ	A	LQ	LQ	A	NH
China Open	NH	LQ	A	LQ	LQ	A	NH
Former non-ranking tournaments
Merseyside Professional Championship	A	1R	Tournament Not Held				
Irish Professional Championship	Not Held		LQ	A	Not Held		

Performance Table Legend
LQ	lost in the qualifying draw	#R	lost in the early rounds of the tournament (WR = Wildcard round, RR = Round robin)	QF	lost in the quarter-finals
SF	lost in the semi-finals	F	lost in the final	W	won the tournament
DNQ	did not qualify for the tournament	A	did not participate in the tournament	WD	withdrew from the tournament

NH / Not Held	event was not held.
NR / Non-Ranking Event	event is/was no longer a ranking event.
R / Ranking Event	event is/was a ranking event.
MR / Minor-Ranking Event	means an event is/was a minor-ranking event.
PA / Pro-am Event	means an event is/was a pro-am event.

== Career finals ==
=== Pro-am finals: 1 ===
Outcome	No.	Year	Championship	Opponent in the final	Score
Runner-up	1.	1999	Pontins Autumn Open	(Northern Ireland) Sean O'Neill	1–5

=== Amateur finals: 12 (7 titles) ===
Outcome	No.	Year	Championship	Opponent in the final	Score
Winner	1.	1995	Irish Under-19 Championship	(Republic of Ireland) Martin McCrudden	3–1
Winner	2.	1995	All-Ireland Under-19 Championship	(England) Barry Hughes	4–2
Winner	3.	1999	World Under-21 Championship	(Netherlands) Rolf de Jong	11–4
Winner	4.	2000	Irish Amateur Championship	(Republic of Ireland) Gary Hardiman	8–7
Runner-up	1.	2004	Irish Amateur Championship	(Republic of Ireland) David Morris	4–8
Runner-up	2.	2007	European Championship	(Belgium) Kevin Van Hove	2–7
Runner-up	3.	2017	Irish Amateur Championship (2)	(Republic of Ireland) Brendan O'Donoghue	3–7
Winner	5.	2018	Irish Masters Championship	(Republic of Ireland) John Farrell	5–1
Runner-up	4.	2018	Irish Amateur Championship (3)	(Republic of Ireland) Michael Judge	5–6
Runner-up	5.	2019	Irish Masters Championship	(Republic of Ireland) Michael Judge	4–5
Winner	6.	2022	Irish Amateur Tour - Event 1	(Republic of Ireland) David Cassidy	4–0
Winner	7.	2023	Irish Masters Championship (2)	(Republic of Ireland) Frank Sarsfield	5–0
