= 2009 World Cup =

2009 World Cup may refer to:

- 2009 Alpine Skiing World Cup
- 2009 ICC World Twenty20
- 2009 Women's Cricket World Cup
- 2009 World Cup (men's golf)
- Chess World Cup 2009
- Football (soccer):
  - Youth: 2009 FIFA U-20 World Cup
  - Junior: 2009 FIFA U-17 World Cup
  - Club: 2009 FIFA Club World Cup
  - Beach soccer: 2009 FIFA Beach Soccer World Cup

== See also ==
- 2009 Continental Championships (disambiguation)
- 2009 World Championships (disambiguation)
- 2009 World Junior Championships (disambiguation)
- 2009 ICC World Cup Qualifier, cricket tournament
