= 2009 Continental Championships =

2009 Continental Championships may refer to:

== Asian Championships ==
- Football (soccer): AFC Champions League 2009
- Multisport: 2009 Asian Indoor Games
- Multisport: 2009 Asian Youth Games
- Athletics: 2009 Asian Championships in Athletics
- Swimming: 2009 Asian Swimming Championships, held November 25–28, 2009 in Foshan, China

== European Championships ==
- Athletics: 2009 European Indoor Championships in Athletics
- Basketball: EuroBasket 2009
- Figure Skating: 2009 European Figure Skating Championships
- Football (soccer): UEFA Champions League 2008-09
- Football (soccer): UEFA Cup 2008-09
- Football (soccer): 2009 UEFA Women's Championship
- Football (soccer): 2009 UEFA European Under-17 Football Championship
- Football (soccer): UEFA Women's Cup 2008-09
- Volleyball: Men's CEV Champions League 2008-09
- Volleyball: Women's CEV Champions League 2008-09

== Oceanian Championships ==
- Football (soccer): OFC Champions League 2008-09

== Pan American Championships / North American Championships ==
- Football (soccer): CONCACAF Champions League 2008-09
- Football (soccer): 2009 CONCACAF Gold Cup

== South American Championships ==
- Football: 2009 South American Youth Championship
- Athletics: 2009 South American Championships in Athletics

== See also ==
- 2009 World Championships (disambiguation)
- 2009 World Junior Championships (disambiguation)
- 2009 World Cup (disambiguation)
- Continental championship (disambiguation)
