= Noppadol Sangnil =

Thai snooker player (born 1977)

Personal information
- Born: July 9, 1977 (age 49)

Sport
- Country: Thailand
- Sport: Snooker
- Professional: 2001/2002, 2009/2010
- Highest ranking: 84 (2009/2010)

Medal record

Representing Thailand

Men's snooker

Southeast Asian Games
Silver medal – second place	2007 Korat	Singles
Gold medal – first place	2007 Korat	Team

Men's Rotation

Southeast Asian Games
Silver medal – second place	1999 Bandar Seri Begawan	Doubles

Noppadol Sangnil (Thai: นพดล แสงนิล; born July 9, 1977) is a Thai former professional snooker player. He first entered the professional tour for the 2001–02 season, but dropped off at the end of the year.

In 2003, he received a grant from King of Thailand, Bhumibol Adulyadej, that enabled him to compete on the 2003-2004 Challenge Tour, for which he had qualified through the Asian qualifying school.

He returned to the main tour for 2009–10, after placing seventh in the finishing seventh in the 2008/09 Pontin's International Open Series rankings.

As of 2016, Noppadol Sangnil was a restaurateur.

== Career finals ==
=== Pro-am finals: 1 ===
Outcome	No.	Year	Championship	Opponent in the final	Score
Runner-up	1.	2007	Southeast Asian Games	(Malaysia) Moh Keen Hoo	1–4

=== Amateur finals: 3 (1 title) ===
Outcome	No.	Year	Championship	Opponent in the final	Score
Runner-up	1.	2000	Asian Amateur Championship	(Philippines) Marlon Manalo	6–8
Runner-up	2.	2008	PIOS – Event 2	(China) Xiao Guodong	5–6
Winner	1.	2010	Thailand Amateur Championship	(Thailand) Supoj Saenla	5–3
