= Brendan O'Donoghue =

Irish snooker player (born 1982)

Personal information
- Born: 15 December 1982 (age 43)

Sport
- Country: Ireland
- Sport: Snooker
- Professional: 2009/2010
- Highest ranking: 87 (May 2010)

Brendan O'Donoghue (born 15 December 1982) is an Irish former professional snooker player.

== Career ==
O'Donoghue statrted playing snooker when he was 5, and started playing in junior tournaments two years later. He won various titles at Under-4 to Under-21 levels, and later won the Irish senior championships in 2003.

He became the Irish nominee as a professional tour player for the 2009–10 season after he topped the Irish national standings. During his stint as a professional he continued to work full-time in a shop. After returning to play as an amateur, he won the Irish Senior title in 2015 and 2017, and each year from 2021 to 2024.

== Performance and rankings timeline ==
Tournament	2004/ 05	2005/ 06	2006/ 07	2009/ 10	2015/ 16
Ranking (Note: It shows the ranking at the beginning of the season.)	(Note: He was an amateur.)			(Note: New players on the Main Tour don't have a ranking.)	
Ranking tournaments
Shanghai Masters	Tournament Not Held			LQ	A
UK Championship	A	A	A	LQ	A
Welsh Open	A	A	A	LQ	A
World Grand Prix	Tournament Not Held				DNQ
Players Tour Championship Finals	Tournament Not Held				DNQ
China Open	A	A	A	LQ	A
World Championship	LQ	A	A	LQ	LQ
Non-ranking tournaments
Six-red World Championship (Note: The event was called the Six-red World Grand Prix (2009/2010))	Tournament Not Held			2R	A
The Masters	A	A	A	LQ	A
Former ranking tournaments
World Open (Note: The event was called the Grand Prix (2004/2005-2006/2007 and 2009/2010))	A	A	A	LQ	NH
Former non-ranking tournaments
Irish Professional Championship	NH	LQ	1R	Not Held	

Performance Table Legend
LQ	lost in the qualifying draw	#R	lost in the early rounds of the tournament (WR = Wildcard round, RR = Round robin)	QF	lost in the quarter-finals
SF	lost in the semi-finals	F	lost in the final	W	won the tournament
DNQ	did not qualify for the tournament	A	did not participate in the tournament	WD	withdrew from the tournament

NH / Not Held	event was not held.
NR / Non-Ranking Event	event is/was no longer a ranking event.
R / Ranking Event	event is/was a ranking event.
MR / Minor-Ranking Event	means an event is/was a minor-ranking event.
PA / Pro-am Event	means an event is/was a pro-am event.

== Career finals ==
=== Team finals: 4 (1 title) ===
Outcome	No.	Year	Championship	Team/Partner	Opponent(s) in the final	Score
Runner-up	1.	2005	European Team Snooker Championships	Ireland; Martin McCrudden; Robert Murphy	Malta; Alex Borg; Joe Grech; Simon Zammit	6–11
Winner	1.	2008	European Team Snooker Championships	Ireland; David Hogan; Martin McCrudden	England; Andy Lee; David Grace; Craig Steadman	10–4
Runner-up	2.	2009	European Team Snooker Championships	Ireland 1 Martin McCrudden; David Hogan	Wales; Peter Roscoe; Elfed Evans; Lee Walker	9–10
Runner-up	3.	2016	European Team Snooker Championships	Ireland 3 Ryan Cronin	Malta; Alex Borg; Brian Cini	3–5

=== Pro-am finals: 2 (1 title) ===
Outcome	No.	Year	Championship	Opponent in the final	Score
Runner-up	1.	2002	Pontins Autumn Open	(Wales) Tim English	4–5
Winner	1.	2005	Ivy Rooms Easter Pro Am	(Republic of Ireland) Gary Hardiman	5–2

=== Amateur finals: 12 (7 titles) ===
Outcome	No.	Year	Championship	Opponent in the final	Score
Runner-up	1.	2001	Irish Amateur Championship	(Republic of Ireland) Martin McCrudden	5–8
Winner	1.	2003	Irish Amateur Championship	(Republic of Ireland) Martin McCrudden	8–5
Runner-up	2.	2005	Irish Amateur Championship (2)	(Republic of Ireland) David Morris	2–8
Runner-up	3.	2006	Irish Amateur Championship (3)	(Republic of Ireland) David Morris	2–8
Runner-up	4.	2012	EBSA European Snooker Championship	(Scotland) Scott Donaldson	3–7
Winner	2.	2015	Irish Amateur Championship (2)	(Republic of Ireland) Robert Murphy	7–2
Winner	3.	2017	Irish Amateur Championship (3)	(Republic of Ireland) Rodney Goggins	7–3
Winner	4.	2021	Irish Amateur Championship (4)	(Republic of Ireland) David Morris	6–5
Winner	5.	2022	Irish Amateur Championship (5)	(Republic of Ireland) Ryan Cronin	7–4
Winner	6.	2023	Irish Amateur Championship (6)	(Republic of Ireland) Ross Bulman	7–5
Winner	7.	2024	Irish Amateur Championship (7)	(Republic of Ireland) Ross Bulman	7–5
Runner-up	5.	2025	Irish Amateur Championship (4)	(Republic of Ireland) David Morris	1–7
