= Eirian Williams =

Welsh snooker referee and police officer

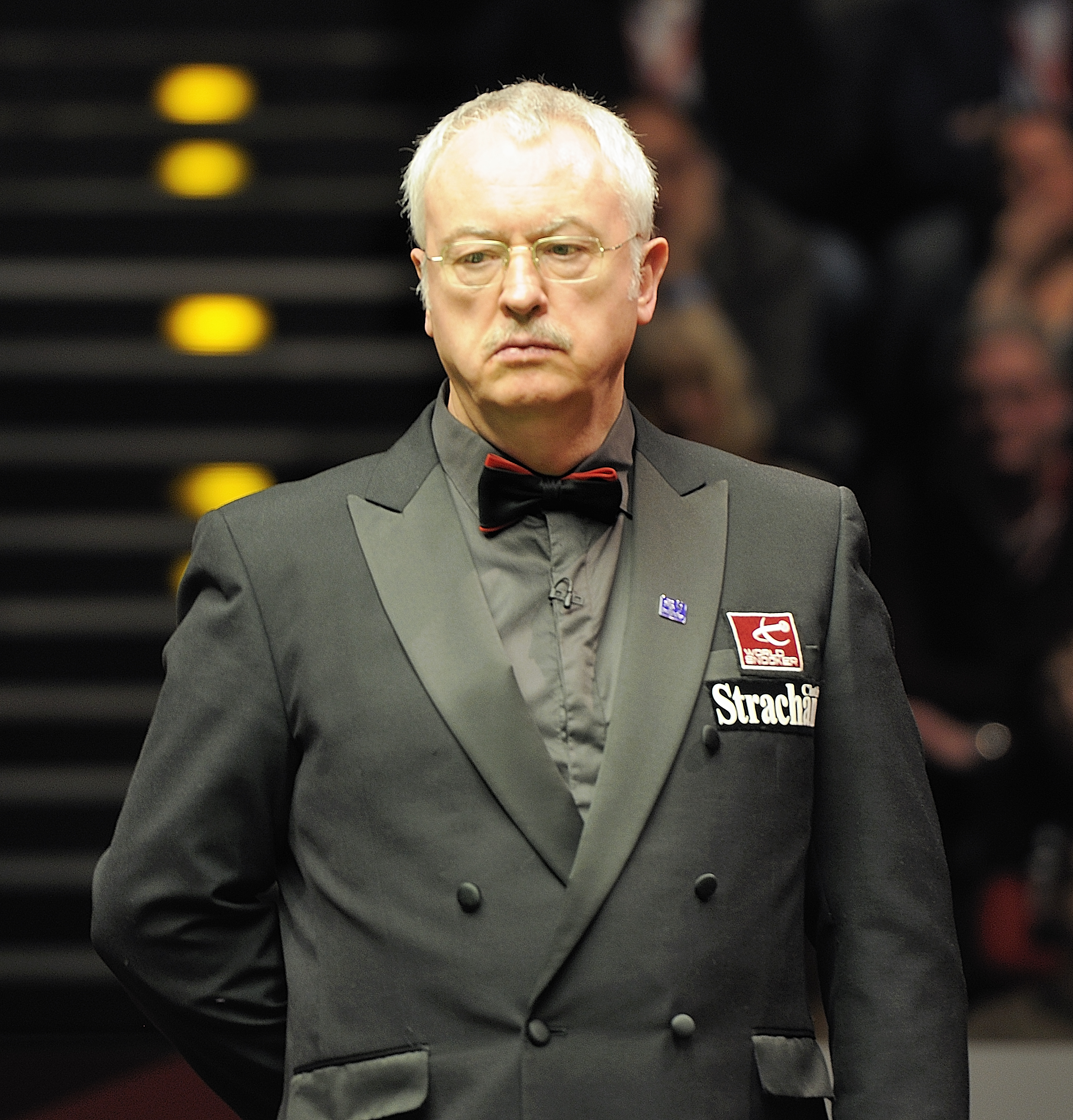
- Eirian Williams at the 2014 German Masters

Personal information
- Born: 3 September 1955 (age 71) Llanelli, Wales

Sport
- Country: Wales
- Sport: Snooker
- Professional: 1991–2014

Eirian Williams (born 3 September 1955) is a former professional snooker referee. He was formerly a police officer with the Dyfed-Powys Police in the Welsh towns of Llanelli, Llandeilo and Ammanford.

== Early life ==
Williams lived in Cynheidre and was a police officer for 18 years, working from Llanelli. He retired from Dyfed-Powys Police to become a professional snooker referee.

== Refereeing career ==
Williams attained the Class C Snooker Referees accreditation in 1981 and within five years, was the Senior Welsh Referee in the Home International Series. By 1991, his Refereeing Classification had twice been upgraded and he now held the Class 1 (formerly A) certificate. In 1991, the Professional tour, run by the World Professional Billiards and Snooker Association (WPBSA) opened the Professional game to an unlimited number of players thus requiring more Referees to officiate at the subsequent extra matches. He was invited to join the Professional Referees Association and became one of a significant number of new Referees from around the globe to give their services to the Professional game. Following his retirement from the Police Service, he undertook several jobs to subsidise his income while he climbed his way up the Professional Refereeing ladder. By 1993, he had been appointed as a Referee Examiner with the Welsh Referees Association. He became a Tutor with the European Billiards and Snooker Association.

He refereed his first World Ranking final in January 1998 at the Regal Welsh tournament in Newport, Monmouthshire where the late Paul Hunter won his first Ranking event title, defeating John Higgins by 9 frames to 5. He has since refereed many more Ranking finals including the Seniors Championship, Welsh Open Championship, Australian Goldfields Open, German Masters, UK Championship, Irish Masters, Wembley Masters, Malta Cup, China Masters, China Open, Thailand Open, British Open, Grand Prix, Bahrain Snooker Championship, World Open and four World Championship Finals at the Crucible Theatre, Sheffield in 2001, 2005, 2007 and 2010.

In November 2014, his retirement from the professional circuit was announced.
