= David Morris (snooker player) =

Irish snooker player (born 1988)

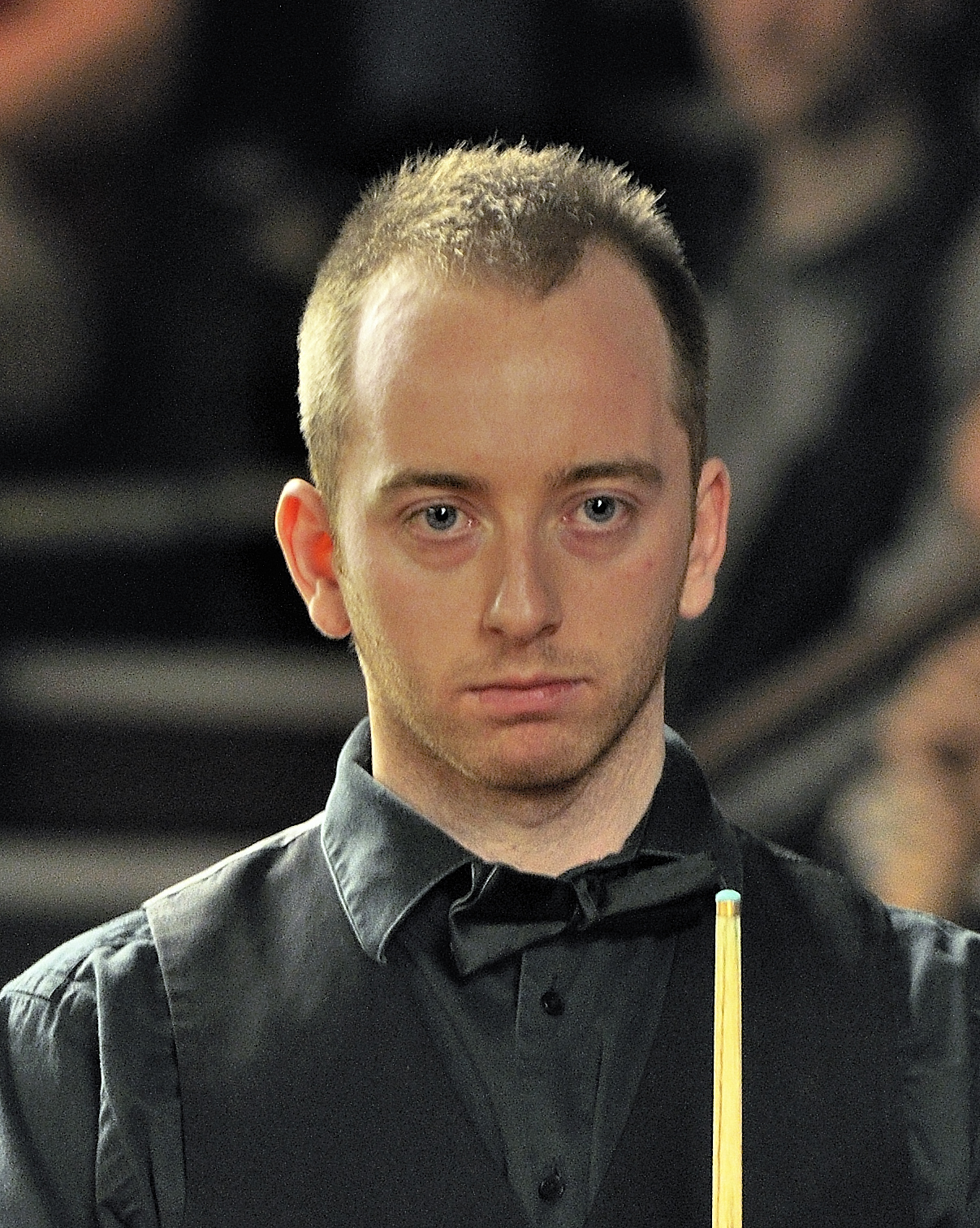
- David Morris at the 2014 German Masters

Personal information
- Nickname: The Wolf of Walkin Street
- Born: 27 November 1988 (age 37) Kilkenny, County Kilkenny

Sport
- Country: Ireland
- Sport: Snooker
- Professional: 2006–2012, 2013–2016
- Highest ranking: 51 (March–May 2015)
- Best ranking finish: Quarter-final (x1)

David Morris (born 27 November 1988 in Kilkenny) is an Irish former professional snooker player. In the 2015-2016 he was ranked as Ireland's number 3 player, after Fergal O'Brien and Ken Doherty.

== Career ==
=== Early career ===
Aged 16, he reached the quarter finals of the U21 World Snooker Championships. He has been Irish champion at every level, winning the overall National championship every year from 2004 to 2006 (becoming the youngest ever winner in 2004). For 2006–07 he made his debut on the main tour, reaching the last 64 in two tournaments.

His best run in the 2007–2008 season was to the last 48 of the UK Championships, where he lost to Dave Harold (who also defeated him in qualifying for the previous year's Welsh Open). His only opening-round defeat that year was to Supoj Saenla in the World Championship, but despite this setback in the highest ranking-point event of the season he did enough to reach the top 64 of the rankings. He also won the Lucan Racing Irish Classic, an event staged by Fergal O'Brien featuring 8 (mostly Irish) professionals – Morris beat O'Brien 5–3 in the final.

In qualifying for the 2008/2009 Bahrain Championship Morris defeated countryman Rodney Goggins and Adrian Gunnell to reach the final qualifying round, where he lost 0–5 to Michael Holt, scoring just 10 points in the process (the lowest in a match of five or more frames since 1992)

=== 2010/2011 ===
He made an important breakthrough at the World Open by beating Robert Milkins 3–1 and Ben Woollaston 3–0 to qualify for the televised stages of an event for the first time. However, he was drawn against the current world champion Neil Robertson losing 3–1.

=== 2011/2012 ===
Morris left his best run of results in the ranking events until the last tournament of the season, the World Championship. He beat Kacper Filipiak, Mark Joyce and Alan McManus before losing to Barry Hawkins 4–10 in the final qualifying round. He played in 11 of the 12 PTC events throughout the season, with his best finish coming in Event 9 where he reached the last 16. He was placed 66 on the PTC Order of Merit and finished the season ranked world number 71, outside of the top 64 who automatically retain their places on the tour for the 2012–13 season.

=== 2012/2013 ===
Morris entered qualifying for the 2013 World Championship but lost 1–5 to Joe Swail in the second preliminary round. He played in the 2013 Q School to try and win a place back on the snooker tour and missed the final black for a 147 in his first match of the second event. Morris won through to the final round of that event but lost 0–4 to Ross Muir. He also reached the final round in the last event and this time succeeded by defeating Gareth Green 4–1 to earn a spot for the 2013–14 season.

=== 2013/2014 ===
Morris began the 2013–14 season by qualifying for the 2013 Wuxi Classic, where he reached the quarter-finals in a ranking event for the first time in his career. He beat Gary Wilson 5–4, Gerard Greene 5–2 and survived a tense 37-minute final frame decider to see off Ali Carter 5–4. He faced Matthew Stevens in the quarters and led 2–1 early on, but then did not score a point in the next three frames and went on to lose 5–2. Morris also had a very good run at the UK Championship with successes over Jamie Cope, 2002 world champion Peter Ebdon and Mitchell Travis, before losing 6–1 in the last 16 to Stuart Bingham. Morris was beaten in the first round of four more ranking events before the end of the season.

=== 2014/2015 ===
In the 2014–15 season, Morris qualified for the Wuxi Classic and the International Championship but lost in the first round of both tournaments. For the second successive year he reached the fourth round of the UK Championship, defeating Li Hang 6–4 in the first round before beating reigning world champion and world number one Mark Selby 6–4 in the second round, a victory that was described as the most significant win of his career to date. He went on to defeat David Gilbert 6–2 in the last 32, but lost 3–6 to Stephen Maguire in the last 16. Morris beat Joe O'Connor 4–0 at the Welsh Open, but lost by a reversal of this scoreline in the second round against Neil Robertson. He qualified for the Indian Open and the China Open, losing 4–0 to Graeme Dott in the second round of the former and 5–1 to Stephen Maguire in the first round of the latter. Morris ended the season at a career-high 51st in the world rankings.

=== 2015/2016 ===
After being knocked out in the third qualifying round of both the Australian Goldfields Open and Shanghai Masters, Morris could only win three more matches during the rest of the season. This meant he dropped off the tour as he finished the year 69th, outside the top 64 in the world rankings. Morris did not enter Q School.

== Performance and rankings timeline ==
| Tournament | 2006/ 07 | 2007/ 08 | 2008/ 09 | 2009/ 10 | 2010/ 11 | 2011/ 12 | 2012/ 13 | 2013/ 14 | 2014/ 15 | 2015/ 16 |
|---|---|---|---|---|---|---|---|---|---|---|
| Ranking (Note: From the 2010/2011 season it shows the ranking at the beginning of the season.) | (Note: New players on the Main Tour don't have a ranking.) | 71 | 64 | 58 | 59 | 80 | (Note: He was an amateur.) | (Note: New players on the Main Tour don't have a ranking.) | 71 | 51 |
Ranking tournaments
| Australian Goldfields Open | Not Held | | | | | LQ | A | LQ | WD | LQ |
| Shanghai Masters | NH | LQ | LQ | LQ | LQ | LQ | A | LQ | LQ | LQ |
| International Championship | Not Held | | | | | | A | LQ | 1R | LQ |
| UK Championship | LQ | LQ | LQ | LQ | LQ | LQ | A | 4R | 4R | 1R |
| German Masters | Not Held | | | | LQ | LQ | A | 1R | LQ | LQ |
| Welsh Open | LQ | LQ | LQ | LQ | LQ | LQ | A | 1R | 2R | 1R |
| World Grand Prix (Note: The event was called the Grand Prix (2006/2007–2009/2010)) | LQ | LQ | LQ | LQ | 1R | LQ | A | 1R | NR | LQ |
| Players Championship Grand Final (Note: The event was called the Players Tour Championship Grand Finals (2010/2011–2012/2013)) | Not Held | | | | DNQ | DNQ | A | DNQ | DNQ | DNQ |
| China Open | LQ | LQ | LQ | LQ | LQ | LQ | A | 1R | 1R | LQ |
| World Championship | LQ | LQ | LQ | LQ | LQ | LQ | LQ | LQ | LQ | LQ |
Non-ranking tournaments
| The Masters | LQ | A | A | A | A | A | A | A | A | A |
| Shoot-Out | Not Held | | | | 1R | A | A | A | 3R | 3R |
Former ranking tournaments
| Malta Cup | LQ | NR | Not held | | | | | | | |
| Northern Ireland Trophy | LQ | LQ | LQ | Not held | | | | | | |
| Bahrain Championship | Not held | | LQ | Not held | | | | | | |
| Wuxi Classic (Note: The event was called the Jiangsu Classic (2008/2009–2009/2010)) | Not Held | | Non-Ranking | | | | A | QF | 1R | NH |
| Indian Open | Not Held | | | | | | | 1R | 2R | NH |
Former non-ranking tournaments
| Irish Masters | RR | Not held | | | | | | | | |
| Irish Classic | NH | W | QF | RR | QF | SF | Tournament Not Held | | | |

Performance Table Legend
| LQ | lost in the qualifying draw | #R | lost in the early rounds of the tournament (WR = Wildcard round, RR = Round robin) | QF | lost in the quarter-finals |
| SF | lost in the semi-finals | F | lost in the final | W | won the tournament |
| DNQ | did not qualify for the tournament | A | did not participate in the tournament | WD | withdrew from the tournament |

| NH / Not Held | means an event was not held. |
| NR / Non-Ranking Event | means an event is/was no longer a ranking event. |
| R / Ranking Event | means an event is/was a ranking event. |
| MR / Minor-Ranking Event | means an event is/was a minor-ranking event. |

== Career finals ==
=== Non-ranking finals: 1 (1 title) ===
| Outcome | No. | Year | Championship | Opponent in the final | Score |
|---|---|---|---|---|---|
| Winner | 1. | 2007 | Irish Classic | (Republic of Ireland) Fergal O'Brien | 5–3 |

=== Amateur finals: 7 (5 titles) ===
| Outcome | No. | Year | Championship | Opponent in the final | Score |
|---|---|---|---|---|---|
| Winner | 1. | 2004 | Irish Amateur Championship | (Republic of Ireland) Rodney Goggins | 8–4 |
| Winner | 2. | 2005 | Irish Amateur Championship (2) | (Republic of Ireland) Brendan O'Donoghue | 8–2 |
| Winner | 3. | 2006 | Irish Amateur Championship (3) | (Republic of Ireland) Brendan O'Donoghue | 8–2 |
| Winner | 4. | 2019 | Irish Amateur Championship (4) | (Republic of Ireland) Josh Boileau | 7–3 |
| Runner-up | 1. | 2021 | Irish Amateur Championship | (Republic of Ireland) Brendan O'Donoghue | 5–6 |
| Runner-up | 2. | 2025 | U.S. Snooker Masters | (United States) Renat Denkha | 4–5 |
| Winner | 5. | 2025 | Irish Amateur Championship (5) | (Republic of Ireland) Brendan O'Donoghue | 7–1 |
