= David Hogan (snooker player) =

Irish snooker player

Personal information
- Born: 7 May 1988 (age 38)

Sport
- Country: Ireland
- Sport: Snooker
- Professional: 2009/2010, 2011/2012
- Highest ranking: 87 (September 2011)

David Hogan (born 7 May 1988) is an Irish former professional snooker player currently residing in Borrisokane, County Tipperary. He first entered the professional tour for the 2009–10 season, by winning the 2009 EBSA European Championship but dropped off the same season. He regained a place for the 2011–12 season by finishing top of the Irish rankings. Hogan could only win two matches on his return to the tour. He played in 11 of the 12 minor-ranking Players Tour Championship events throughout the season and following his participation in the last one in December, he did not enter another tournament. He finished the season outside the top 64 who retain their places for the 2012–13 season and therefore dropped off the main tour again. Hogan has not played in a professional event since.

== Performance and rankings timeline ==
Tournament	2009/ 10	2011/ 12
Ranking (Note: It shows the ranking at the beginning of the season.)	(Note: New players on the Main Tour don't have a ranking.)	
Ranking tournaments
Australian Goldfields Open	NH	LQ
Shanghai Masters	LQ	LQ
UK Championship	LQ	LQ
German Masters	NH	LQ
Welsh Open	LQ	A
Grand Prix	LQ	A
Players Tour Championship Finals	NH	DNQ
China Open	LQ	A
World Championship	LQ	A
Non-ranking tournaments
The Masters	LQ	A

Performance Table Legend
LQ	lost in the qualifying draw	#R	lost in the early rounds of the tournament (WR = Wildcard round, RR = Round robin)	QF	lost in the quarter-finals
SF	lost in the semi-finals	F	lost in the final	W	won the tournament
DNQ	did not qualify for the tournament	A	did not participate in the tournament	WD	withdrew from the tournament

NH / Not Held	event was not held.
NR / Non-Ranking Event	event is/was no longer a ranking event.
R / Ranking Event	event is/was a ranking event.
MR / Minor-Ranking Event	means an event is/was a minor-ranking event.
PA / Pro-am Event	means an event is/was a pro-am event.
