= Players Tour Championship 2011/2012 – Event 3 =

Players Tour Championship 2011/2012 Event 3
Tournament information
- Dates: 17–21 August 2011
- Venue: World Snooker Academy
- City: Sheffield
- Country: England
- Organisation: World Snooker
- Format: Minor-ranking event
- Total prize fund: £50,000
- Winner's share: £10,000
- Highest break: Jamie Cope (ENG) (142)

Final
- Champion: Ben Woollaston (ENG)
- Runner-up: Graeme Dott (SCO)
- Score: 4–2

The Players Tour Championship 2011/2012 – Event 3 was a professional minor-ranking snooker tournament that took place between 17 and 21 August 2011 at the World Snooker Academy in Sheffield, England.

Ben Woollaston won his first professional title by defeating Graeme Dott 4–2 in the final.

== Prize fund and ranking points ==
The breakdown of prize money and ranking points of the event is shown below:

	Prize fund	Ranking points^{1}
Winner	£10,000	2,000
Runner-up	£5,000	1,600
Semi-finalist	£2,500	1,280
Quarter-finalist	£1,500	1,000
Last 16	£1,000	760
Last 32	£600	560
Last 64	£200	360
Total	£50,000	–

- ^{1} Only professional players can earn ranking points.

== Main draw ==
=== Preliminary rounds ===
==== Round 1 ====
Best of 7 frames

(England) Jason Tart	2–4	(England) Sean O'Sullivan

==== Round 2 ====
Best of 7 frames

(England) Martin Ball	3–4	(England) Michael Wasley
(Wales) Callum Lloyd	w/o–w/d	(England) Nick Pearce
(Wales) Gareth Allen	4–2	(England) Hammad Miah
(England) Rogelio Esteiro	0–4	(England) Allan Taylor
(England) Danny Brindle	0–4	(England) Reanne Evans
(England) Neal Jones	4–0	(England) James Frith
(England) Farakh Ajaib	4–1	(Wales) Andrew Rogers
(England) Mitchell Mann	4–3	(England) Ian Glover
(England) Joel Walker	4–1	(Belgium) Hans Blanckaert
(England) Dean Reynolds	2–4	(England) Lewis Mayes
(Wales) Jak Jones	w/o–w/d	(Republic of Ireland) Joe Delaney
(England) Nick Jennings	4–3	(England) Antony Parsons
(England) Gareth Green	4–2	(England) Rock Hui
(England) Jamie Walker	4–0	(England) Bash Maqsood
(Canada) Brent Kolbeck	w/d–w/o	(Pakistan) Shahram Changezi
(England) Brian Robertson	2–4	(England) Phil O'Kane
(Germany) Lasse Münstermann	w/d–w/o	(England) Stephen Craigie
(England) Andy Lee	w/d–w/o	(China) Chen Zhe
(Wales) Kishan Hirani	4–3	(England) James Murdoch
(England) David Gray	4–2	(England) Sean O'Sullivan
(England) Christopher Keogan	4–1	(England) Charlie Walters
(England) Lee Farebrother	0–4	(England) Craig Steadman
(England) Clark Lillyman	2–4	(England) Steve Ventham
(Republic of Ireland) Michael Judge	w/o–w/d	(England) Richard Barrett
(England) Shaun Wilkes	1–4	(England) James McGouran
(Wales) Daniel Woodward	0–4	(England) Declan Bristow
(England) Gary Wilson	4–0	(England) Jamie Curtis-Barrett
(Republic of Ireland) Leo Fernandez	4–1	(England) Mitchell Travis

(England) Kristian Willetts	1–4	(England) Shane Castle
(England) Robbie Williams	4–1	(Wales) Alex Taubman
(England) Michael Wild	4–2	(England) Callum Downing
(England) Sanderson Lam	2–4	(Scotland) Marc Davis
(England) Les Dodd	0–4	(England) Tony Knowles
(England) Ben Harrison	4–2	(England) Ryan Causton
(England) Liam Monk	4–1	(Poland) Grzegorz Biernadski
(England) Steve Judd	2–4	(China) Zhang Anda
(Scotland) Sean James Riach	4–3	(England) Steve Martin
(England) Ian Burns	4–2	(England) Brian Morgan
(England) John Woods	0–4	(Wales) Stephen Ellis
(Wales) Duane Jones	4–1	(England) Justin Astley
(England) Jamie O'Neill	4–2	(England) George Marter
(England) Chris Norbury	4–0	(Republic of Ireland) Dessie Sheehan
(England) Lewis Frampton	0–4	(England) Robert Tickner
(England) Saqib Nasir	4–0	(England) James Silverwood
(England) Jordan Rimmer	2–4	(England) John Whitty
(England) Sam Harvey	4–0	(England) Damian Wilks
(England) Sydney Wilson	2–4	(England) Martin O'Donnell
(England) Brian Cox	2–4	(England) Mike Hallett
(England) Matthew Day	4–0	(England) Sachin Plaha
(England) Lee Page	4–1	(England) Oliver Lines
(England) James Cahill	4–2	(England) Jake Nicholson
(England) James Hill	4–2	(England) Andrew Milliard
(England) Ashley Wright	4–2	(England) Jack Culligan
(England) Ricky Norris	2–4	(England) Kyren Wilson
(England) Scott Bell	4–3	(England) Ian Stark
(Republic of Ireland) Douglas Hogan	4–0	(England) Oliver Brown

==== Round 3 ====
Best of 7 frames

(England) Michael Wasley	4–2	(Wales) Callum Lloyd
(Wales) Gareth Allen	1–4	(England) Allan Taylor
(England) Reanne Evans	1–4	(England) Neal Jones
(England) Farakh Ajaib	2–4	(England) Mitchell Mann
(England) Joel Walker	4–3	(England) Lewis Mayes
(Wales) Jak Jones	2–4	(England) Nick Jennings
(England) Gareth Green	4–3	(England) Jamie Walker
(Pakistan) Shahram Changezi	4–2	(England) Phil O'Kane
(England) Stephen Craigie	4–1	(China) Chen Zhe
(Wales) Kishan Hirani	4–2	(England) David Gray
(England) Christopher Keogan	3–4	(England) Craig Steadman
(England) Steve Ventham	1–4	(Republic of Ireland) Michael Judge
(England) James McGouran	4–1	(England) Declan Bristow
(England) Gary Wilson	4–0	(Republic of Ireland) Leo Fernandez

(England) Shane Castle	1–4	(England) Robbie Williams
(England) Michael Wild	0–4	(Scotland) Marc Davis
(England) Tony Knowles	0–4	(England) Ben Harrison
(England) Liam Monk	0–4	(China) Zhang Anda
(Scotland) Sean James Riach	1–4	(England) Ian Burns
(Wales) Stephen Ellis	4–3	(Wales) Duane Jones
(England) Jamie O'Neill	4–0	(England) Chris Norbury
(England) Robert Tickner	0–4	(England) Saqib Nasir
(England) John Whitty	2–4	(England) Sam Harvey
(England) Martin O'Donnell	4–0	(England) Mike Hallett
(England) Matthew Day	3–4	(England) Lee Page
(England) James Cahill	3–4	(England) James Hill
(England) Ashley Wright	0–4	(England) Kyren Wilson
(England) Scott Bell	1–4	(Republic of Ireland) Douglas Hogan

=== Main rounds ===
==== Top half ====
===== Section 1 =====
Last 128; Best of 7 frames
(Wales) Mark Williams	0
(Republic of Ireland) Michael Judge	4
(England) Andrew Higginson	4
(England) Nick Jennings	0
(England) Rod Lawler	1
(England) Ben Woollaston	4
(Northern Ireland) Gerard Greene	2
(Norway) Kurt Maflin	4
(England) Jack Lisowski	w/o
(Belgium) Bjorn Haneveer	w/d
(England) Jamie Cope	4
(England) Robbie Williams	3
(Republic of Ireland) Ken Doherty	4
(England) Martin O'Donnell	1
(England) Barry Pinches	2
(England) Jamie O'Neill	4

Last 64; Best of 7 frames
(Republic of Ireland) Michael Judge	3
(England) Andrew Higginson	4
(England) Ben Woollaston	4
(Norway) Kurt Maflin	3
(England) Jack Lisowski	3
(England) Jamie Cope	4
(Republic of Ireland) Ken Doherty	4
(England) Jamie O'Neill	1

Last 32; Best of 7 frames
(England) Andrew Higginson	2
(England) Ben Woollaston	4
(England) Jamie Cope	2
(Republic of Ireland) Ken Doherty	4

Last 16; Best of 7 frames
(England) Ben Woollaston	4
(Republic of Ireland) Ken Doherty	0

===== Section 2 =====
Last 128; Best of 7 frames
(Hong Kong) Marco Fu	4
(Thailand) James Wattana	2
(England) Anthony Hamilton	w/o
(India) Lucky Vatnani	w/d
(Scotland) Alan McManus	4
(England) Matthew Couch	0
(England) Stuart Bingham	4
(Poland) Kacper Filipiak	0
(England) Ali Carter	4
(England) Stephen Craigie	2
(Australia) Neil Robertson	4
(Scotland) Scott MacKenzie	1
(England) Peter Lines	3
(Wales) Michael White	4
(England) Joe Jogia	4
(China) Li Yan	3

Last 64; Best of 7 frames
(Hong Kong) Marco Fu	4
(England) Anthony Hamilton	1
(Scotland) Alan McManus	4
(England) Stuart Bingham	0
(England) Ali Carter	3
(Australia) Neil Robertson	4
(Wales) Michael White	0
(England) Joe Jogia	4

Last 32; Best of 7 frames
(Hong Kong) Marco Fu	2
(Scotland) Alan McManus	4
(Australia) Neil Robertson	2
(England) Joe Jogia	4

Last 16; Best of 7 frames
(Scotland) Alan McManus	4
(England) Joe Jogia	1

===== Section 3 =====
Last 128; Best of 7 frames
(Northern Ireland) Joe Swail	0
(Thailand) Passakorn Suwannawat	4
(England) Ricky Walden	4
(China) Zhang Anda	2
(England) Steve Davis	4
(Wales) Daniel Wells	1
(England) Michael Holt	4
(England) Gareth Green	1
(England) Rory McLeod	2
(England) Adam Duffy	4
(Wales) Matthew Stevens	4
(England) Sam Baird	3
(Scotland) Anthony McGill	4
(Wales) Andrew Pagett	0
(England) Mark King	3
(China) Tian Pengfei	4

Last 64; Best of 7 frames
(Thailand) Passakorn Suwannawat	4
(England) Ricky Walden	0
(England) Steve Davis	1
(England) Michael Holt	4
(England) Adam Duffy	2
(Wales) Matthew Stevens	4
(Scotland) Anthony McGill	4
(China) Tian Pengfei	3

Last 32; Best of 7 frames
(Thailand) Passakorn Suwannawat	2
(England) Michael Holt	4
(Wales) Matthew Stevens	2
(Scotland) Anthony McGill	4

Last 16; Best of 7 frames
(England) Michael Holt	1
(Scotland) Anthony McGill	4

===== Section 4 =====
Last 128; Best of 7 frames
(England) Robert Milkins	0
(England) Paul Davison	4
(Scotland) Stephen Maguire	4
(England) Allan Taylor	1
(China) Liu Chuang	2
(England) David Grace	4
(England) Shaun Murphy	1
(England) Kyren Wilson	4
(Northern Ireland) Mark Allen	4
(England) Ian Burns	2
(Wales) Dominic Dale	4
(England) Saqib Nasir	2
(China) Ding Junhui	4
(England) Joel Walker	0
(England) Stephen Lee	4
(England) Ben Harrison	3

Last 64; Best of 7 frames
(England) Paul Davison	0
(Scotland) Stephen Maguire	4
(England) David Grace	4
(England) Kyren Wilson	2
(Northern Ireland) Mark Allen	4
(Wales) Dominic Dale	2
(China) Ding Junhui	1
(England) Stephen Lee	4

Last 32; Best of 7 frames
(Scotland) Stephen Maguire	4
(England) David Grace	1
(Northern Ireland) Mark Allen	2
(England) Stephen Lee	4

Last 16; Best of 7 frames
(Scotland) Stephen Maguire	1
(England) Stephen Lee	4

==== Bottom half ====
===== Section 5 =====
Last 128; Best of 7 frames
(England) Mark Selby	4
(Belgium) Luca Brecel	0
(Wales) Ryan Day	w/o
(Finland) Robin Hull	w/d
(England) Peter Ebdon	1
(England) Gary Wilson	4
(England) Nigel Bond	4
(Scotland) Marc Davis	2
(England) Tom Ford	3
(England) Sam Craigie	4
(Scotland) Marcus Campbell	4
(Republic of Ireland) David Hogan	2
(England) Mark Joyce	1
(Republic of Ireland) David Morris	4
(Scotland) Jamie Burnett	4
(England) Adam Wicheard	3

Last 64; Best of 7 frames
(England) Mark Selby	4
(Wales) Ryan Day	1
(England) Gary Wilson	4
(England) Nigel Bond	1
(England) Sam Craigie	0
(Scotland) Marcus Campbell	4
(Republic of Ireland) David Morris	4
(Scotland) Jamie Burnett	3

Last 32; Best of 7 frames
(England) Mark Selby	4
(England) Gary Wilson	2
(Scotland) Marcus Campbell	4
(Republic of Ireland) David Morris	2

Last 16; Best of 7 frames
(England) Mark Selby	2
(Scotland) Marcus Campbell	4

===== Section 6 =====
Last 128; Best of 7 frames
(Malta) Tony Drago	4
(England) Michael Wasley	2
(England) Martin Gould	4
(Thailand) Dechawat Poomjaeng	0
(Republic of Ireland) Fergal O'Brien	1
(England) Craig Steadman	4
(England) Barry Hawkins	4
(India) Aditya Mehta	0
(England) Judd Trump	4
(England) Sam Harvey	0
(England) Adrian Gunnell	2
(Pakistan) Shahram Changezi	4
(China) Xiao Guodong	4
(England) Neal Jones	2
(England) Dave Harold	4
(Wales) Stephen Ellis	0

Last 64; Best of 7 frames
(Malta) Tony Drago	4
(England) Martin Gould	3
(England) Craig Steadman	2
(England) Barry Hawkins	4
(England) Judd Trump	4
(Pakistan) Shahram Changezi	1
(China) Xiao Guodong	4
(England) Dave Harold	2

Last 32; Best of 7 frames
(Malta) Tony Drago	2
(England) Barry Hawkins	4
(England) Judd Trump	0
(China) Xiao Guodong	4

Last 16; Best of 7 frames
(England) Barry Hawkins	4
(China) Xiao Guodong	1

===== Section 7 =====
Last 128; Best of 7 frames
(England) Matthew Selt	4
(China) Cao Yupeng	0
(England) Alfie Burden	4
(England) David Birley	0
(China) Liang Wenbo	4
(England) James Hill	0
(England) Mark Davis	4
(England) Stuart Carrington	1
(England) Jimmy Robertson	4
(England) Lee Page	0
(Wales) Jamie Jones	4
(China) Yu Delu	3
(England) Andy Hicks	4
(Republic of Ireland) Douglas Hogan	0
(England) Ian McCulloch	4
(Northern Ireland) Joe Meara	0

Last 64; Best of 7 frames
(England) Matthew Selt	4
(England) Alfie Burden	2
(China) Liang Wenbo	2
(England) Mark Davis	4
(England) Jimmy Robertson	1
(Wales) Jamie Jones	4
(England) Andy Hicks	4
(England) Ian McCulloch	3

Last 32; Best of 7 frames
(England) Matthew Selt	4
(England) Mark Davis	0
(Wales) Jamie Jones	4
(England) Andy Hicks	1

Last 16; Best of 7 frames
(England) Matthew Selt	3
(Wales) Jamie Jones	4

===== Section 8 =====
Last 128; Best of 7 frames
(Scotland) Graeme Dott	4
(England) James Welsh	1
(England) Ronnie O'Sullivan	4
(England) David Gilbert	1
(China) Liu Song	0
(England) Andrew Norman	4
(Scotland) Stephen Hendry	4
(England) Liam Highfield	0
(England) Jimmy White	4
(England) Simon Bedford	0
(England) Mike Dunn	4
(Wales) Kishan Hirani	1
(England) Joe Perry	4
(England) James McGouran	3
(Scotland) John Higgins	4
(England) Mitchell Mann	3

Last 64; Best of 7 frames
(Scotland) Graeme Dott	4
(England) Ronnie O'Sullivan	1
(England) Andrew Norman	2
(Scotland) Stephen Hendry	4
(England) Jimmy White	4
(England) Mike Dunn	1
(England) Joe Perry	1
(Scotland) John Higgins	4

Last 32; Best of 7 frames
(Scotland) Graeme Dott	4
(Scotland) Stephen Hendry	0
(England) Jimmy White	1
(Scotland) John Higgins	4

Last 16; Best of 7 frames
(Scotland) Graeme Dott	4
(Scotland) John Higgins	2

==== Finals ====
Quarter-finals; Best of 7 frames		Semi-finals; Best of 7 frames		Final; Best of 7 frames
(England) Ben Woollaston	4
(Scotland) Alan McManus	3	(England) Ben Woollaston	4
(Scotland) Anthony McGill	4	(Scotland) Anthony McGill	0
(England) Stephen Lee	2			(England) Ben Woollaston	4
(Scotland) Marcus Campbell	0			(Scotland) Graeme Dott	2
(England) Barry Hawkins	4	(England) Barry Hawkins	1
(Wales) Jamie Jones	0	(Scotland) Graeme Dott	4
(Scotland) Graeme Dott	4

== Century breaks ==
Only from last 128 onwards.

- 142, 105 – Jamie Cope
- 141 – Marco Fu
- 139 – David Grace
- 137 – Kyren Wilson
- 136, 116, 112, 101 – Graeme Dott
- 136 – Alan McManus
- 135, 129 – Martin Gould
- 132, 121 – Anthony McGill
- 132 – Li Yan
- 132 – Judd Trump
- 131, 106 – Andrew Higginson
- 131, 103 – Kurt Maflin
- 131 – Jimmy White
- 131 – John Higgins
- 128, 112, 100 – Neil Robertson
- 127, 107, 102 – Stephen Lee
- 125 – Stephen Hendry
- 124 – Stuart Bingham
- 123 – Adam Duffy
- 121, 105 – Matthew Stevens
- 118, 111 – Andy Hicks
- 117, 108 – Barry Hawkins
- 113 – Mark Selby
- 112 – Paul Davison
- 112 – Jamie Jones
- 111, 108 – Michael Holt
- 108, 107, 105 – Matthew Selt
- 106 – Ken Doherty
- 105 – Tony Drago
- 104 – Michael White
- 104 – Steve Davis
- 103 – Ben Woollaston
- 102 – Joe Jogia
- 101 – Tom Ford
- 100 – Fergal O'Brien
