= Players Tour Championship 2011/2012 – Event 5 =

Players Tour Championship 2011/2012 Event 5
Tournament information
- Dates: 21–25 September 2011
- Venue: World Snooker Academy
- City: Sheffield
- Country: England
- Organisation: World Snooker
- Format: Minor-ranking event
- Total prize fund: £50,000
- Winner's share: £10,000
- Highest break: David Gilbert (ENG) (141)

Final
- Champion: Andrew Higginson (ENG)
- Runner-up: John Higgins (SCO)
- Score: 4–1

The Players Tour Championship 2011/2012 – Event 5 was a professional minor-ranking snooker tournament that took place between 21 and 25 September 2011 at the World Snooker Academy in Sheffield, England.

Andrew Higginson won his first professional title by defeating John Higgins 4–1 in the final.

== Prize fund and ranking points ==
The breakdown of prize money and ranking points of the event is shown below:

	Prize fund	Ranking points^{1}
Winner	£10,000	2,000
Runner-up	£5,000	1,600
Semi-finalist	£2,500	1,280
Quarter-finalist	£1,500	1,000
Last 16	£1,000	760
Last 32	£600	560
Last 64	£200	360
Total	£50,000	–

- ^{1} Only professional players can earn ranking points.

== Main draw ==
=== Preliminary rounds ===
==== Round 1 ====
Best of 7 frames

(England) Sam Harvey	4–2	(England) Shane Castle
(England) Phil O'Kane	0–4	(England) Sydney Wilson
(England) David Gray	4–2	(England) Michael Wild
(England) Joel Walker	4–3	(England) Shaun Wilkes
(England) Marc Harman	1–4	(England) James Murdoch
(England) Bash Maqsood	3–4	(England) Mike Hallett
(England) Jonathan Birch	4–1	(England) Clark Lillyman
(England) Rogelio Esteiro	0–4	(England) Antony Parsons
(England) Matthew Day	3–4	(England) Martin O'Donnell
(Scotland) Michael Leslie	w/o–w/d	(England) Terry Challenger
(China) Chen Zhe	4–3	(England) Alex Davies
(Thailand) Thanawat Thirapongpaiboon	4–2	(England) Martin Ball
(Wales) Kishan Hirani	4–3	(England) Steve Ventham
(Wales) Duane Jones	4–1	(England) Ian Stark
(England) John Whitty	4–0	(England) Kashif Khan
(England) Jamie Curtis-Barrett	1–4	(England) Stephen Craigie
(England) Stephen John Barton	0–4	(England) Ben Harrison
(England) James Silverwood	w/d–w/o	(England) Justin Astley
(England) Jamie Green	0–4	(England) Chris Norbury
(Wales) Gareth Allen	2–4	(England) Les Dodd
(England) Zak Surety	4–2	(Republic of Ireland) Dessie Sheehan
(England) Robert Tickner	1–4	(England) James Hill
(England) Robert James	4–1	(India) David Singh

(England) Jordan Winbourne	4–1	(Wales) Ross Jones
(England) Jamie O'Neill	4–0	(Pakistan) Hasan Khan
(Northern Ireland) Patrick Wallace	4–1	(England) James Cahill
(England) Alan Edmonds	2–4	(Scotland) Eden Sharav
(England) Saqib Nasir	2–4	(Scotland) Marc Davis
(England) Michael Wasley	4–1	(Wales) Jamie Clarke
(England) Sachin Plaha	3–4	(England) Nico Elton
(England) Mitchell Travis	4–3	(England) Oliver Lines
(Belgium) Hans Blanckaert	4–1	(England) Oliver Brown
(England) Kyren Wilson	4–0	(England) Ashley Carty
(Republic of Ireland) John Sutton	4–0	(Canada) Brent Kolbeck
(Wales) Richard King	3–4	(England) Tom Maxfield
(England) James Brown	2–4	(England) Lee Page
(China) Zhang Anda	4–2	(Wales) Alex Taubman
(England) Brian Morgan	1–4	(England) Allan Taylor
(England) Lee Farebrother	4–3	(England) David Birley
(England) Danny Brindle	1–4	(England) Nick Jennings
(Republic of Ireland) Douglas Hogan	4–1	(England) Nikolas Charalambous
(England) Mitchell Mann	w/o–w/d	(England) Tony Knowles
(England) Elliot Slessor	3–4	(Pakistan) Najmur Khan
(England) Liam Monk	1–4	(England) Ian Glover
(Pakistan) Omer Butt	1–4	(England) Sean Hopkin
(England) George Marter	2–4	(England) Ricky Norris

==== Round 2 ====
Best of 7 frames

(England) Sam Harvey	4–2	(England) Sydney Wilson
(England) David Gray	4–3	(England) Joel Walker
(England) James Murdoch	1–4	(England) Mike Hallett
(England) Ian Burns	4–0	(England) Jonathan Birch
(England) Jake Nicholson	3–4	(England) Antony Parsons
(England) Martin O'Donnell	4–0	(Scotland) Michael Leslie
(China) Chen Zhe	1–4	(Thailand) Thanawat Thirapongpaiboon
(England) Ryan Causton	0–4	(Wales) Kishan Hirani
(Wales) Duane Jones	4–3	(England) John Whitty
(England) Stephen Craigie	4–0	(England) Ben Harrison
(England) Justin Astley	2–4	(England) Chris Norbury
(England) Les Dodd	4–2	(England) Zak Surety
(Wales) Jak Jones	4–3	(England) James Hill
(England) Robert James	4–3	(England) Jordan Winbourne

(England) Jamie O'Neill	1–4	(Northern Ireland) Patrick Wallace
(Scotland) Eden Sharav	4–2	(Scotland) Marc Davis
(England) Michael Wasley	4–0	(England) Nico Elton
(England) Reanne Evans	2–4	(England) Mitchell Travis
(Belgium) Hans Blanckaert	2–4	(England) Kyren Wilson
(England) Andrew Milliard	2–4	(Republic of Ireland) John Sutton
(England) James McGouran	4–1	(England) Tom Maxfield
(England) Lee Page	0–4	(China) Zhang Anda
(England) Allan Taylor	4–1	(England) Lee Farebrother
(England) Nick Jennings	3–4	(Republic of Ireland) Douglas Hogan
(England) Mitchell Mann	4–1	(Pakistan) Najmur Khan
(England) Ashley Wright	4–3	(England) Ian Glover
(England) Sean O’Sullivan	4–2	(England) Sean Hopkin
(England) Christopher Keogan	4–1	(England) Ricky Norris

=== Main rounds ===
==== Top half ====
===== Section 1 =====
Last 128; Best of 7 frames
(England) Ronnie O'Sullivan	4
(Wales) Mark Williams	1
(England) Peter Lines	4
(England) Sam Harvey	1
(England) Andy Hicks	2
(England) Jack Lisowski	4
(England) Mark Davis	0
(England) Andrew Norman	4
(China) Ding Junhui	4
(England) David Gray	3
(England) David Gilbert	4
(England) Mike Hallett	1
(England) Sam Craigie	4
(China) Cao Yupeng	1
(Thailand) James Wattana	2
(England) Ian Burns	4

Last 64; Best of 7 frames
(England) Ronnie O'Sullivan	2
(England) Peter Lines	4
(England) Jack Lisowski	4
(England) Andrew Norman	3
(China) Ding Junhui	3
(England) David Gilbert	4
(England) Sam Craigie	1
(England) Ian Burns	4

Last 32; Best of 7 frames
(England) Peter Lines	3
(England) Jack Lisowski	4
(England) David Gilbert	4
(England) Ian Burns	1

Last 16; Best of 7 frames
(England) Jack Lisowski	4
(England) David Gilbert	3

===== Section 2 =====
Last 128; Best of 7 frames
(Thailand) Passakorn Suwannawat	4
(England) Paul Davison	3
(England) Robbie Williams	w/o
(India) Lucky Vatnani	w/d
(England) Jamie Cope	0
(England) Antony Parsons	4
(Scotland) Jamie Burnett	4
(England) Martin O'Donnell	1
(England) Mark Joyce	1
(Thailand) Thanawat Thirapongpaiboon	4
(England) Gary Wilson	3
(England) Shaun Murphy	4
(England) Simon Bedford	4
(England) Barry Pinches	3
(Scotland) Stephen Hendry	3
(England) Anthony Hamilton	4

Last 64; Best of 7 frames
(Thailand) Passakorn Suwannawat	3
(England) Robbie Williams	4
(England) Antony Parsons	0
(Scotland) Jamie Burnett	4
(Thailand) Thanawat Thirapongpaiboon	3
(England) Shaun Murphy	4
(England) Simon Bedford	0
(England) Anthony Hamilton	4

Last 32; Best of 7 frames
(England) Robbie Williams	2
(Scotland) Jamie Burnett	4
(England) Shaun Murphy	2
(England) Anthony Hamilton	4

Last 16; Best of 7 frames
(Scotland) Jamie Burnett	4
(England) Anthony Hamilton	2

===== Section 3 =====
Last 128; Best of 7 frames
(England) Joe Perry	4
(Wales) Kishan Hirani	0
(Scotland) Stephen Maguire	2
(England) Peter Ebdon	4
(England) Mike Dunn	3
(Northern Ireland) Gerard Greene	4
(England) Ricky Walden	4
(Wales) Duane Jones	0
(Scotland) Graeme Dott	4
(England) Stephen Craigie	0
(England) Joe Jogia	w/o
(Finland) Robin Hull	w/d
(England) Dave Harold	4
(England) Chris Norbury	3
(England) Stephen Lee	4
(England) Adam Wicheard	1

Last 64; Best of 7 frames
(England) Joe Perry	4
(England) Peter Ebdon	0
(Northern Ireland) Gerard Greene	1
(England) Ricky Walden	4
(Scotland) Graeme Dott	4
(England) Joe Jogia	3
(England) Dave Harold	4
(England) Stephen Lee	3

Last 32; Best of 7 frames
(England) Joe Perry	4
(England) Ricky Walden	3
(Scotland) Graeme Dott	0
(England) Dave Harold	4

Last 16; Best of 7 frames
(England) Joe Perry	2
(England) Dave Harold	4

===== Section 4 =====
Last 128; Best of 7 frames
(Scotland) Marcus Campbell	1
(England) Ian McCulloch	4
(England) Nigel Bond	4
(England) Les Dodd	0
(England) Tom Ford	4
(Republic of Ireland) David Hogan	2
(England) Jimmy Robertson	4
(Wales) Jak Jones	2
(China) Xiao Guodong	4
(England) Robert James	1
(England) Andrew Higginson	4
(Northern Ireland) Joe Meara	0
(England) Ben Woollaston	4
(Northern Ireland) Patrick Wallace	0
(China) Yu Delu	2
(China) Liu Song	4

Last 64; Best of 7 frames
(England) Ian McCulloch	4
(England) Nigel Bond	1
(England) Tom Ford	4
(England) Jimmy Robertson	3
(China) Xiao Guodong	0
(England) Andrew Higginson	4
(England) Ben Woollaston	4
(China) Liu Song	0

Last 32; Best of 7 frames
(England) Ian McCulloch	4
(England) Tom Ford	2
(England) Andrew Higginson	4
(England) Ben Woollaston	1

Last 16; Best of 7 frames
(England) Ian McCulloch	0
(England) Andrew Higginson	4

==== Bottom half ====
===== Section 5 =====
Last 128; Best of 7 frames
(England) Judd Trump	4
(Hong Kong) Marco Fu	2
(England) Mark King	4
(England) Adrian Gunnell	1
(Malta) Tony Drago	1
(China) Liu Chuang	4
(China) Li Yan	4
(Poland) Kacper Filipiak	0
(England) Craig Steadman	2
(Scotland) Scott MacKenzie	4
(Wales) Dominic Dale	3
(Northern Ireland) Joe Swail	4
(England) Ali Carter	0
(India) Aditya Mehta	4
(Australia) Neil Robertson	4
(Scotland) Eden Sharav	0

Last 64; Best of 7 frames
(England) Judd Trump	4
(England) Mark King	1
(China) Liu Chuang	3
(China) Li Yan	4
(Scotland) Scott MacKenzie	4
(Northern Ireland) Joe Swail	1
(India) Aditya Mehta	3
(Australia) Neil Robertson	4

Last 32; Best of 7 frames
(England) Judd Trump	1
(China) Li Yan	4
(Scotland) Scott MacKenzie	2
(Australia) Neil Robertson	4

Last 16; Best of 7 frames
(China) Li Yan	3
(Australia) Neil Robertson	4

===== Section 6 =====
Last 128; Best of 7 frames
(Scotland) John Higgins	4
(England) David Grace	0
(Republic of Ireland) Ken Doherty	2
(England) Michael Wasley	4
(England) Liam Highfield	3
(England) Mitchell Travis	4
(Scotland) Alan McManus	4
(England) Alfie Burden	2
(Northern Ireland) Mark Allen	4
(China) Tian Pengfei	3
(England) Rory McLeod	2
(England) Rod Lawler	4
(Wales) Matthew Stevens	1
(England) Kyren Wilson	4
(Wales) Ryan Day	4
(Norway) Kurt Maflin	0

Last 64; Best of 7 frames
(Scotland) John Higgins	4
(England) Michael Wasley	2
(England) Mitchell Travis	0
(Scotland) Alan McManus	4
(Northern Ireland) Mark Allen	2
(England) Rod Lawler	4
(England) Kyren Wilson	1
(Wales) Ryan Day	4

Last 32; Best of 7 frames
(Scotland) John Higgins	4
(Scotland) Alan McManus	1
(England) Rod Lawler	0
(Wales) Ryan Day	4

Last 16; Best of 7 frames
(Scotland) John Higgins	4
(Wales) Ryan Day	2

===== Section 7 =====
Last 128; Best of 7 frames
(Wales) Michael White	4
(Republic of Ireland) John Sutton	3
(Scotland) Anthony McGill	4
(England) James McGouran	1
(Thailand) Dechawat Poomjaeng	4
(Wales) Daniel Wells	3
(England) Sam Baird	4
(China) Zhang Anda	3
(Republic of Ireland) Fergal O'Brien	4
(England) Allan Taylor	1
(England) Stuart Bingham	4
(England) Stuart Carrington	0
(England) Barry Hawkins	4
(Republic of Ireland) Douglas Hogan	1
(England) Matthew Selt	3
(China) Liang Wenbo	4

Last 64; Best of 7 frames
(Wales) Michael White	4
(Scotland) Anthony McGill	2
(Thailand) Dechawat Poomjaeng	4
(England) Sam Baird	2
(Republic of Ireland) Fergal O'Brien	1
(England) Stuart Bingham	4
(England) Barry Hawkins	4
(China) Liang Wenbo	2

Last 32; Best of 7 frames
(Wales) Michael White	4
(Thailand) Dechawat Poomjaeng	1
(England) Stuart Bingham	3
(England) Barry Hawkins	4

Last 16; Best of 7 frames
(Wales) Michael White	3
(England) Barry Hawkins	4

===== Section 8 =====
Last 128; Best of 7 frames
(England) Jimmy White	4
(Wales) Andrew Pagett	2
(Wales) Jamie Jones	2
(England) Matthew Couch	4
(Belgium) Luca Brecel	4
(England) Mitchell Mann	1
(England) Martin Gould	4
(England) Ashley Wright	2
(England) Steve Davis	4
(England) Sean O’Sullivan	1
(England) Adam Duffy	4
(Republic of Ireland) David Morris	3
(England) Michael Holt	4
(England) Christopher Keogan	1
(England) Mark Selby	2
(England) Robert Milkins	4

Last 64; Best of 7 frames
(England) Jimmy White	4
(England) Matthew Couch	3
(Belgium) Luca Brecel	1
(England) Martin Gould	4
(England) Steve Davis	4
(England) Adam Duffy	0
(England) Michael Holt	4
(England) Robert Milkins	2

Last 32; Best of 7 frames
(England) Jimmy White	0
(England) Martin Gould	4
(England) Steve Davis	1
(England) Michael Holt	4

Last 16; Best of 7 frames
(England) Martin Gould	1
(England) Michael Holt	4

==== Finals ====
Quarter-finals; Best of 7 frames		Semi-finals; Best of 7 frames		Final; Best of 7 frames
(England) Jack Lisowski	4
(Scotland) Jamie Burnett	3	(England) Jack Lisowski	1
(England) Dave Harold	2	(England) Andrew Higginson	4
(England) Andrew Higginson	4			(England) Andrew Higginson	4
(Australia) Neil Robertson	1			(Scotland) John Higgins	1
(Scotland) John Higgins	4	(Scotland) John Higgins	4
(England) Barry Hawkins	4	(England) Barry Hawkins	1
(England) Michael Holt	2

== Century breaks ==
Only from last 128 onwards.

- 141, 105 – David Gilbert
- 138, 128, 112, 107 – Neil Robertson
- 137 – Liu Song
- 137 – Dave Harold
- 135, 129 – Mark King
- 133, 115, 107 – Barry Hawkins
- 132, 108 – Michael Holt
- 132 – Michael White
- 128, 112 – Martin Gould
- 126, 113 – Jimmy Robertson
- 125, 100 – Ryan Day
- 125 – Shaun Murphy
- 125 – Anthony McGill
- 117, 105 – Graeme Dott
- 117 – Andrew Higginson
- 115, 102 – Robert Milkins
- 114 – Thanawat Thirapongpaiboon
- 114 – Liu Chuang
- 113 – Robbie Williams
- 113 – John Sutton
- 110, 102 – Ken Doherty
- 110 – Jamie Burnett
- 108 – Paul Davison
- 106, 100 – Tom Ford
- 106 – Matthew Selt
- 105, 105, 103 – John Higgins
- 105 – Ding Junhui
- 104 – Rory McLeod
- 103 – Judd Trump
- 102 – Ricky Walden
- 102 – Sam Baird
- 101 – Barry Pinches
- 101 – Alan McManus
- 100 – Gerard Greene
