= 2012 International Championship =

Tournament information
- Dates: 28 October – 4 November 2012
- Venue: Sichuan International Tennis Center
- City: Chengdu
- Country: China
- Organisation: World Snooker
- Format: Ranking event
- Total prize fund: £600,000
- Winner's share: £125,000
- Highest break: Neil Robertson (AUS) (142)

Final
- Champion: Judd Trump (ENG)
- Runner-up: Neil Robertson (AUS)
- Score: 10–8

The 2012 International Championship was a professional ranking snooker tournament that took place between 28 October and 4 November 2012 at the Sichuan International Tennis Center in Chengdu, China. It was the fourth ranking event of the 2012/2013 season. It was named as the "first overseas 'major'", as the tournament had the same level of ranking points as the UK Championship.

Judd Trump won the third ranking title of his career by defeating Neil Robertson 10–8 in the final. Trump also became the world number one as a result of reaching the final.

== Prize fund ==
The breakdown of prize money for this year is shown below:

- Winner: £125,000
- Runner-up: £62,500
- Semi-final: £30,000
- Quarter-final: £17,500
- Last 16: £12,000
- Last 32: £7,000
- Last 48: £3,000
- Last 64: £1,500
- Non-televised highest break: £500
- Televised highest break: £2,000
- Total: £600,000

== Wildcard round ==
These matches were played in Chengdu on 28 and 29 October 2012.

Match		Score	
WC1	Michael White (WAL)	5–6	Lyu Haotian (CHN)
WC2	Ken Doherty (IRL)	5–6	Zhao Xintong (CHN)
WC3	Pankaj Advani (IND)	w/d–w/o	Zhou Yuelong (CHN)
WC4	Fergal O'Brien (IRL)	6–3	Chen Feilong (CHN)
WC5	Aditya Mehta (IND)	6–5	Zhu Yinghui (CHN)
WC6	Cao Yupeng (CHN)	6–5	Wang Yuchen (CHN)
WC7	Jamie Burnett (SCO)	6–0	Niu Zhuang (CHN)
WC8	Barry Pinches (ENG)	5–6	Lu Ning (CHN)

== Main draw ==
Last 32; Best of 11 frames
1	(England) Ronnie O'Sullivan	w/d
(China) Lyu Haotian	w/o
15	(Scotland) Graeme Dott	3
(Wales) Dominic Dale	6
12	(Wales) Matthew Stevens	6
(China) Zhao Xintong	5
7	(Australia) Neil Robertson	6
(Wales) Ryan Day	3
6	(England) Shaun Murphy	6
(England) Andrew Higginson	0
10	(China) Ding Junhui	6
(China) Zhou Yuelong	1
16	(England) Martin Gould	5
(Hong Kong) Marco Fu	6
4	(Wales) Mark Williams	4
(England) Mark Davis	6
3	(England) Judd Trump	6
(Republic of Ireland) Fergal O'Brien	3
13	(England) Stuart Bingham	4
(India) Aditya Mehta	6
14	(Northern Ireland) Mark Allen	6
(England) Robert Milkins	2
8	(Scotland) John Higgins	3
(China) Cao Yupeng	6
5	(Scotland) Stephen Maguire	6
(Scotland) Jamie Burnett	3
9	(England) Stephen Lee	w/d
(England) Peter Ebdon	w/o
11	(England) Ricky Walden	6
(China) Lu Ning	4
2	(England) Mark Selby	6
(England) Ali Carter	3

Last 16; Best of 11 frames
(China) Lyu Haotian	6
(Wales) Dominic Dale	5
12	(Wales) Matthew Stevens	2
7	(Australia) Neil Robertson	6
6	(England) Shaun Murphy	6
10	(China) Ding Junhui	4
(Hong Kong) Marco Fu	6
(England) Mark Davis	4
3	(England) Judd Trump	6
(India) Aditya Mehta	0
14	(Northern Ireland) Mark Allen	6
(China) Cao Yupeng	2
5	(Scotland) Stephen Maguire	1
(England) Peter Ebdon	6
11	(England) Ricky Walden	6
2	(England) Mark Selby	3

Quarter-finals; Best of 11 frames
(China) Lyu Haotian	2
7	(Australia) Neil Robertson	6
6	(England) Shaun Murphy	6
(Hong Kong) Marco Fu	4
3	(England) Judd Trump	6
14	(Northern Ireland) Mark Allen	5
(England) Peter Ebdon	6
11	(England) Ricky Walden	0

Semi-finals; Best of 17 frames
7	(Australia) Neil Robertson	9
6	(England) Shaun Murphy	5
3	(England) Judd Trump	9
(England) Peter Ebdon	1

Final; Best of 19 frames
7	(Australia) Neil Robertson	8
3	(England) Judd Trump	10

== Final ==
Final: Best of 19 frames. Referee: Leo Scullion. Sichuan International Tennis Center, Chengdu, China, 4 November 2012.
Neil Robertson (7); Australia	8–10	Judd Trump (3); England
Afternoon: 21–72 (61), 41–84, 99–25 (77), 83–14 (68), 82–20 (59), 92–0 (51), 0–102 (67), 59–67, 73–23 (50); Evening: 12–70 (65), 17–68, 71–37 (68), 88–42 (88), 88–1 (73), 13–66, 0–96 (96), 3–119 (119), 12–95
88	Highest break	119
0	Century breaks	1
8	50+ breaks	5

== Qualifying ==
These matches took place between 19 and 22 August 2012 at the World Snooker Academy in Sheffield, England.

Round 1 Best of 11 frames
(Thailand) Thanawat Thirapongpaiboon	4
(Thailand) Thepchaiya Un-Nooh	6
(England) Paul Davison	6
(Scotland) Fraser Patrick	4
(England) Michael Wasley	6
(England) Jamie O'Neill	4
(Belgium) Luca Brecel	w/o
(Egypt) Mohamed Khairy	w/d
(England) Sam Baird	6
(Australia) Ben Judge	1
(India) Pankaj Advani	6
(England) Craig Steadman	1
(China) Li Yan	5
(China) Zhang Anda	6
(Norway) Kurt Maflin	6
(Wales) Gareth Allen	5
(England) Robbie Williams	6
(Scotland) Scott Donaldson	3
(India) Aditya Mehta	6
(Scotland) Michael Leslie	3
(Malta) Tony Drago	3
(England) Liam Highfield	6
(China) Tian Pengfei	6
(England) Joel Walker	3
(England) Ian Burns	6
(England) Sean O'Sullivan	4
(China) Chen Zhe	1
(England) Martin O'Donnell	6
(Thailand) Passakorn Suwannawat	2
(Wales) Daniel Wells	6
(Thailand) Dechawat Poomjaeng	6
(England) David Grace	3

Round 2 Best of 11 frames
(Thailand) James Wattana	5
(Thailand) Thepchaiya Un-Nooh	6
(England) Peter Lines	5
(England) Paul Davison	6
(China) Liu Chuang	6
(England) Michael Wasley	4
(England) Jimmy Robertson	2
(Belgium) Luca Brecel	6
(England) David Gilbert	6
(England) Sam Baird	2
(England) Steve Davis	5
(India) Pankaj Advani	6
(England) Alfie Burden	6
(China) Zhang Anda	3
(England) Rod Lawler	5
(Norway) Kurt Maflin	6
(England) Andy Hicks	4
(England) Robbie Williams	6
(England) Mike Dunn	3
(India) Aditya Mehta	6
(England) Adam Duffy	6
(England) Liam Highfield	5
(China) Cao Yupeng	6
(China) Tian Pengfei	5
(China) Yu Delu	6
(England) Ian Burns	3
(Scotland) Anthony McGill	6
(England) Martin O'Donnell	4
(England) Barry Pinches	6
(Wales) Daniel Wells	2
(England) Mark Joyce	6
(Thailand) Dechawat Poomjaeng	4

Round 3 Best of 11 frames
(Wales) Michael White	6
(Thailand) Thepchaiya Un-Nooh	2
(England) Ben Woollaston	3
(England) Paul Davison	6
(Wales) Jamie Jones	2
(China) Liu Chuang	6
(England) Anthony Hamilton	6
(Belgium) Luca Brecel	3
(England) Rory McLeod	3
(England) David Gilbert	6
(Scotland) Alan McManus	3
(India) Pankaj Advani	6
(Northern Ireland) Gerard Greene	5
(England) Alfie Burden	6
(England) Jack Lisowski	2
(Norway) Kurt Maflin	6
(England) Mark King	6
(England) Robbie Williams	3
(England) Jimmy White	5
(India) Aditya Mehta	6
(China) Liang Wenbo	6
(England) Adam Duffy	4
(England) Matthew Selt	3
(China) Cao Yupeng	6
(Scotland) Jamie Burnett	6
(China) Yu Delu	3
(England) Nigel Bond	6
(Scotland) Anthony McGill	0
(China) Xiao Guodong	5
(England) Barry Pinches	6
(England) Dave Harold	6
(England) Mark Joyce	4

Round 4 Best of 11 frames
(England) Barry Hawkins	5
(Wales) Michael White	6
(Wales) Dominic Dale	6
(England) Paul Davison	3
(Republic of Ireland) Ken Doherty	6
(China) Liu Chuang	3
(Wales) Ryan Day	6
(England) Anthony Hamilton	3
(England) Andrew Higginson	6
(England) David Gilbert	3
(England) Michael Holt	4
(India) Pankaj Advani	6
(Hong Kong) Marco Fu	6
(England) Alfie Burden	3
(England) Mark Davis	6
(Norway) Kurt Maflin	2
(Republic of Ireland) Fergal O'Brien	6
(England) Mark King	3
(England) Jamie Cope	4
(India) Aditya Mehta	6
(England) Robert Milkins	6
(China) Liang Wenbo	1
(England) Tom Ford	3
(China) Cao Yupeng	6
(Scotland) Marcus Campbell	3
(Scotland) Jamie Burnett	6
(England) Peter Ebdon	6
(England) Nigel Bond	5
(England) Joe Perry	5
(England) Barry Pinches	6
(England) Ali Carter	6
(England) Dave Harold	3

== Century breaks ==
=== Qualifying stage centuries ===
- 143, 108 – Andrew Higginson
- 136 – Dominic Dale
- 134, 102 – David Gilbert
- 132 – Barry Hawkins
- 130, 121 – Aditya Mehta
- 129 – Tian Pengfei
- 125 – Barry Pinches
- 123 – Dechawat Poomjaeng
- 121 – Daniel Wells
- 120, 114 – Anthony McGill
- 119 – Jamie Burnett
- 119 – Marco Fu
- 117, 115, 113, 105 – Pankaj Advani
- 117 – Li Yan
- 113 – Scott Donaldson
- 112 – Andy Hicks
- 109 – Ian Burns
- 108 – Passakorn Suwannawat
- 104 – Rod Lawler
- 104 – Zhang Anda
- 103 – Paul Davison
- 102, 102 – Michael White
- 101 – Liam Highfield
- 101 – Jamie Jones

=== Televised stage centuries ===
- 142, 137, 118, 115, 100 – Neil Robertson
- 138 – Mark Davis
- 134 – Lu Ning
- 132 – Robert Milkins
- 129, 108, 103 – Shaun Murphy
- 129 – Aditya Mehta
- 128, 103 – Ding Junhui
- 124, 121, 104 – Mark Allen
- 119, 118, 107 – Judd Trump
- 118, 102 – Stephen Maguire
- 113 – Ricky Walden
- 111 – Zhao Xintong
- 110 – Cao Yupeng
- 108 – Dominic Dale
- 106 – Peter Ebdon
