= Players Tour Championship 2011/2012 – Event 8 =

Players Tour Championship 2011/2012 Event 8
Tournament information
- Dates: 20–23 October 2011
- Venue: Killarney Convention Centre
- City: Killarney
- Country: Ireland
- Organisation: World Snooker
- Format: Minor-ranking event
- Total prize fund: €50,000
- Winner's share: €10,000
- Highest break: Ryan Day (WAL) (142)

Final
- Champion: Neil Robertson (AUS)
- Runner-up: Judd Trump (ENG)
- Score: 4–1

The Players Tour Championship 2011/2012 – Event 8 (also known as the 2011 Alex Higgins International Trophy) was a professional minor-ranking snooker tournament that took place between 20 and 23 October 2011 at the Killarney Convention Centre in Killarney, Ireland.

Neil Robertson won the ninth professional title of his career by defeating Judd Trump 4–1 in the final.

== Prize fund and ranking points ==
The breakdown of prize money and ranking points of the event is shown below:

	Prize fund	Ranking points^{1}
Winner	€10,000	2,000
Runner-up	€5,000	1,600
Semi-finalist	€2,500	1,280
Quarter-finalist	€1,500	1,000
Last 16	€1,000	760
Last 32	€600	560
Last 64	€200	360
Total	€50,000	–

- ^{1} Only professional players can earn ranking points.

== Main draw ==
=== Preliminary rounds ===
==== Round 1 ====
Best of 7 frames

(England) Ashley Wright	4–0	(Republic of Ireland) Alan Cleary
(Northern Ireland) Alastair Wilson	4–2	(Republic of Ireland) Daniel O’Regan
(Republic of Ireland) John Torpey	4–1	(England) Ricky Norris
(Republic of Ireland) Tom O'Driscoll	w/o–w/d	(Republic of Ireland) Patrick O'Rourke
(Republic of Ireland) David Foran	0–4	(Republic of Ireland) Ray Power
(Republic of Ireland) Philip Browne	4–3	(Republic of Ireland) Paddy Murphy
(Northern Ireland) Gerard McAuley	4–2	(Northern Ireland) Gary Crawford
(Republic of Ireland) Daniel Kirby	0–4	(Northern Ireland) Keith Sheldrick
(Republic of Ireland) Colm Gilcreest	4–1	(Republic of Ireland) David Cassidy
(Republic of Ireland) Derek O'Neill	w/o–w/d	(Northern Ireland) Jonathan Nelson
(Republic of Ireland) John Sutton	4–0	(England) Phil O'Kane
(Republic of Ireland) Daniel Dempsey	w/o–w/d	(England) David Gray
(England) Jamie Walker	4–2	(Republic of Ireland) Mark Tuite
(Republic of Ireland) Josh Boileau	4–3	(Northern Ireland) Patrick Wallace
(England) Jonathan Birch	2–4	(Republic of Ireland) Robert Redmond
(Republic of Ireland) Clinton Franey	4–2	(England) Martin O'Donnell
(Republic of Ireland) Thomas Dowling	w/d–w/o	(Republic of Ireland) Michael Mullen
(Republic of Ireland) Karl Fitzpatrick	w/o–w/d	(Scotland) Jonathan Fulcher
(Republic of Ireland) Anthony Cronin	w/o–w/d	(Belgium) Hans Blanckaert
(Northern Ireland) Declan Brennan	2–4	(Republic of Ireland) Jonathan Friel
(Republic of Ireland) John Friel	2–4	(Republic of Ireland) Ryan Cronin
(Republic of Ireland) Anthony O'Connor	0–4	(England) Allan Taylor
(England) Sydney Wilson	w/d–w/o	(Republic of Ireland) Douglas Hogan

(Northern Ireland) Jordan Brown	4–3	(China) Chen Zhe
(England) Mike Hallett	w/o–w/d	(Pakistan) Najmur Khan
(Republic of Ireland) Paul Ennis	w/o–w/d	(Northern Ireland) Paul Currie
(Northern Ireland) Kieran McMahon	4–0	(Republic of Ireland) Robbie Walker
(England) Nick Jennings	w/o–w/d	(Republic of Ireland) Frank Sarsfield
(Republic of Ireland) Robert Murphy	w/o–w/d	(England) Tony Knowles
(England) Martin Ball	1–4	(China) Zhang Anda
(Republic of Ireland) Nicky Ryan	4–2	(Republic of Ireland) Sean McMonagle
(Republic of Ireland) J.P. Kelly	4–2	(Republic of Ireland) Aiden O'Sullivan
(India) David Singh	4–1	(Republic of Ireland) Derry O'Sullivan
(England) Ryan Causton	4–1	(Republic of Ireland) Karl Busteed
(England) Alex Davies	4–2	(England) Matthew Day
(England) Liam Monk	w/d–w/o	(Republic of Ireland) Joe Delaney
(Republic of Ireland) Greg Casey	2–4	(England) Jamie O' Neill
(Thailand) Thanawat Thirapongpaiboon	3–4	(Northern Ireland) Julian Logue
(Republic of Ireland) Philip Arnold	4–1	(Republic of Ireland) Benny O'Brien
(England) Jonathan Williams	4–3	(England) Mitchell Travis
(Republic of Ireland) Stephen Byrne	2–4	(Wales) Alex Taubman
(Republic of Ireland) Chris Hannigan	2–4	(Northern Ireland) Brian Milne
(England) Ben Harrison	4–0	(Republic of Ireland) Kevin O'Leary
(Republic of Ireland) Connell Doherty	w/d–w/o	(England) Stephen Craigie
(England) James Welsh	w/d–w/o	(England) Mitchell Mann

==== Round 2 ====
Best of 7 frames

(England) Reanne Evans	3–4	(England) Ashley Wright
(England) Ian Burns	4–1	(Northern Ireland) Alastair Wilson
(Republic of Ireland) John Torpey	4–2	(Republic of Ireland) Tom O'Driscoll
(England) Michael Wasley	4–0	(Republic of Ireland) Ray Power
(Republic of Ireland) Philip Browne	4–3	(Northern Ireland) Gerard McAuley
(Northern Ireland) Keith Sheldrick	4–2	(Republic of Ireland) Colm Gilcreest
(Republic of Ireland) Derek O'Neill	0–4	(Republic of Ireland) John Sutton
(Wales) Gareth Allen	4–1	(Republic of Ireland) Daniel Dempsey
(England) Jamie Walker	4–2	(Republic of Ireland) Josh Boileau
(Scotland) Eden Sharav	w/d–w/o	(Republic of Ireland) Robert Redmond
(Republic of Ireland) Clinton Franey	4–0	(Republic of Ireland) Michael Mullen
(England) Gary Wilson	4–1	(Republic of Ireland) Karl Fitzpatrick
(Republic of Ireland) Dessie Sheehan	3–4	(Republic of Ireland) Anthony Cronin
(Republic of Ireland) Jonathan Friel	0–4	(Republic of Ireland) Ryan Cronin
(England) Robbie Williams	4–1	(England) Allan Taylor
(Republic of Ireland) Douglas Hogan	3–4	(Northern Ireland) Jordan Brown

(England) Les Dodd	w/d–w/o	(England) Mike Hallett
(England) Oliver Brown	4–1	(Republic of Ireland) Paul Ennis
(Northern Ireland) Kieran McMahon	2–4	(England) Nick Jennings
(England) Sean O'Sullivan	w/o–w/d	(Republic of Ireland) Robert Murphy
(Wales) Jak Jones	w/d–w/o	(China) Zhang Anda
(Republic of Ireland) Nicky Ryan	1–4	(Republic of Ireland) J.P. Kelly
(England) Sam Harvey	4–2	(India) David Singh
(England) Ryan Causton	2–4	(England) Alex Davies
(England) Kyren Wilson	4–2	(Republic of Ireland) Joe Delaney
(England) Chris Norbury	0–4	(England) Jamie O' Neill
(Northern Ireland) Julian Logue	4–3	(Republic of Ireland) Philip Arnold
(Republic of Ireland) Ray Whelan	0–4	(England) Jonathan Williams
(Wales) Alex Taubman	4–0	(Northern Ireland) Brian Milne
(England) Craig Steadman	4–3	(England) Ben Harrison
(England) Bash Maqsood	0–4	(England) Stephen Craigie
(England) Shane Castle	w/d–w/o	(England) Mitchell Mann

=== Main rounds ===
==== Top half ====
===== Section 1 =====
Last 128; Best of 7 frames
(England) Ronnie O'Sullivan	4
(India) Aditya Mehta	0
(China) Xiao Guodong	4
(England) Peter Ebdon	3
(England) Sam Craigie	3
(Northern Ireland) Gerard Greene	4
(Republic of Ireland) Fergal O'Brien	4
(Wales) Daniel Wells	3
(Scotland) Marcus Campbell	0
(England) Ashley Wright	4
(Thailand) Passakorn Suwannawat	4
(England) Barry Pinches	3
(Scotland) John Higgins	4
(England) Ian Burns	1
(England) Nigel Bond	w/o
(England) Ian McCulloch	w/d

Last 64; Best of 7 frames
(England) Ronnie O'Sullivan	1
(China) Xiao Guodong	4
(Northern Ireland) Gerard Greene	4
(Republic of Ireland) Fergal O'Brien	3
(England) Ashley Wright	4
(Thailand) Passakorn Suwannawat	1
(Scotland) John Higgins	4
(England) Nigel Bond	2

Last 32; Best of 7 frames
(China) Xiao Guodong	2
(Northern Ireland) Gerard Greene	4
(England) Ashley Wright	2
(Scotland) John Higgins	4

Last 16; Best of 7 frames
(Northern Ireland) Gerard Greene	2
(Scotland) John Higgins	4

===== Section 2 =====
Last 128; Best of 7 frames
(Wales) Ryan Day	4
(Republic of Ireland) John Torpey	2
(England) Simon Bedford	3
(China) Liu Song	4
(Thailand) James Wattana	4
(Wales) Mark Williams	2
(England) Mark Joyce	4
(England) Michael Wasley	0
(Northern Ireland) Mark Allen	4
(England) Paul Davison	0
(England) Mike Dunn	w/o
(England) Anthony Hamilton	w/d
(England) Peter Lines	3
(Republic of Ireland) Philip Browne	4
(England) David Gilbert	4
(Northern Ireland) Keith Sheldrick	2

Last 64; Best of 7 frames
(Wales) Ryan Day	4
(China) Liu Song	1
(Thailand) James Wattana	2
(England) Mark Joyce	4
(Northern Ireland) Mark Allen	4
(England) Mike Dunn	0
(Republic of Ireland) Philip Browne	0
(England) David Gilbert	4

Last 32; Best of 7 frames
(Wales) Ryan Day	4
(England) Mark Joyce	0
(Northern Ireland) Mark Allen	4
(England) David Gilbert	1

Last 16; Best of 7 frames
(Wales) Ryan Day	3
(Northern Ireland) Mark Allen	4

===== Section 3 =====
Last 128; Best of 7 frames
(Scotland) Jamie Burnett	4
(Republic of Ireland) John Sutton	1
(England) Martin Gould	4
(Wales) Gareth Allen	1
(Wales) Matthew Stevens	4
(England) Jamie Walker	0
(Wales) Jamie Jones	4
(Republic of Ireland) Robert Redmond	0
(Malta) Tony Drago	4
(Republic of Ireland) Clinton Franey	1
(Australia) Neil Robertson	4
(England) Gary Wilson	1
(England) Joe Perry	4
(Republic of Ireland) Anthony Cronin	0
(England) Joe Jogia	4
(Northern Ireland) Joe Swail	1

Last 64; Best of 7 frames
(Scotland) Jamie Burnett	2
(England) Martin Gould	4
(Wales) Matthew Stevens	2
(Wales) Jamie Jones	4
(Malta) Tony Drago	1
(Australia) Neil Robertson	4
(England) Joe Perry	0
(England) Joe Jogia	4

Last 32; Best of 7 frames
(England) Martin Gould	4
(Wales) Jamie Jones	0
(Australia) Neil Robertson	4
(England) Joe Jogia	0

Last 16; Best of 7 frames
(England) Martin Gould	0
(Australia) Neil Robertson	4

===== Section 4 =====
Last 128; Best of 7 frames
(Wales) Dominic Dale	4
(China) Cao Yupeng	3
(Scotland) Stephen Maguire	4
(Republic of Ireland) Ryan Cronin	2
(Scotland) Stephen Hendry	4
(England) Robbie Williams	2
(Thailand) Dechawat Poomjaeng	4
(Northern Ireland) Jordan Brown	3
(England) Tom Ford	4
(China) Liu Chuang	3
(England) Jamie Cope	4
(England) Mike Hallett	3
(England) Ben Woollaston	4
(China) Liang Wenbo	2
(England) Liam Highfield	4
(England) Rod Lawler	1

Last 64; Best of 7 frames
(Wales) Dominic Dale	2
(Scotland) Stephen Maguire	4
(Scotland) Stephen Hendry	1
(Thailand) Dechawat Poomjaeng	4
(England) Tom Ford	4
(England) Jamie Cope	2
(England) Ben Woollaston	4
(England) Liam Highfield	3

Last 32; Best of 7 frames
(Scotland) Stephen Maguire	2
(Thailand) Dechawat Poomjaeng	4
(England) Tom Ford	3
(England) Ben Woollaston	4

Last 16; Best of 7 frames
(Thailand) Dechawat Poomjaeng	1
(England) Ben Woollaston	4

==== Bottom half ====
===== Section 5 =====
Last 128; Best of 7 frames
(England) Judd Trump	4
(England) Adam Wicheard	3
(Wales) Andrew Pagett	3
(England) Andrew Norman	4
(Hong Kong) Marco Fu	4
(England) Oliver Brown	0
(Wales) Michael White	4
(England) Matthew Couch	1
(Belgium) Luca Brecel	4
(England) Nick Jennings	1
(Scotland) Anthony McGill	4
(England) Sean O'Sullivan	1
(England) Stephen Lee	4
(China) Zhang Anda	0
(England) Sam Baird	4
(Republic of Ireland) J.P. Kelly	0

Last 64; Best of 7 frames
(England) Judd Trump	4
(England) Andrew Norman	2
(Hong Kong) Marco Fu	4
(Wales) Michael White	2
(Belgium) Luca Brecel	4
(Scotland) Anthony McGill	2
(England) Stephen Lee	4
(England) Sam Baird	0

Last 32; Best of 7 frames
(England) Judd Trump	4
(Hong Kong) Marco Fu	0
(Belgium) Luca Brecel	2
(England) Stephen Lee	4

Last 16; Best of 7 frames
(England) Judd Trump	4
(England) Stephen Lee	0

===== Section 6 =====
Last 128; Best of 7 frames
(Republic of Ireland) David Morris	1
(England) Sam Harvey	4
(England) Steve Davis	2
(England) Shaun Murphy	4
(Scotland) Alan McManus	w/o
(Finland) Robin Hull	w/d
(England) Dave Harold	4
(England) Alex Davies	0
(England) Rory McLeod	4
(England) Kyren Wilson	2
(England) Mark King	4
(Scotland) Scott MacKenzie	3
(Republic of Ireland) Ken Doherty	4
(Northern Ireland) Joe Meara	3
(England) Ali Carter	w/o
(England) Adrian Gunnell	w/d

Last 64; Best of 7 frames
(England) Sam Harvey	1
(England) Shaun Murphy	4
(Scotland) Alan McManus	4
(England) Dave Harold	2
(England) Rory McLeod	4
(England) Mark King	3
(Republic of Ireland) Ken Doherty	4
(England) Ali Carter	3

Last 32; Best of 7 frames
(England) Shaun Murphy	1
(Scotland) Alan McManus	4
(England) Rory McLeod	3
(Republic of Ireland) Ken Doherty	4

Last 16; Best of 7 frames
(Scotland) Alan McManus	4
(Republic of Ireland) Ken Doherty	1

===== Section 7 =====
Last 128; Best of 7 frames
(China) Yu Delu	4
(England) Jack Lisowski	0
(England) Andy Hicks	4
(England) David Grace	2
(England) Adam Duffy	4
(England) Robert Milkins	1
(China) Li Yan	4
(England) Jamie O' Neill	1
(England) Ricky Walden	4
(Northern Ireland) Julian Logue	1
(England) Matthew Selt	4
(England) Jonathan Williams	3
(England) Jimmy White	4
(Republic of Ireland) David Hogan	2
(England) Stuart Bingham	4
(Wales) Alex Taubman	0

Last 64; Best of 7 frames
(China) Yu Delu	4
(England) Andy Hicks	2
(England) Adam Duffy	4
(China) Li Yan	3
(England) Ricky Walden	4
(England) Matthew Selt	2
(England) Jimmy White	1
(England) Stuart Bingham	4

Last 32; Best of 7 frames
(China) Yu Delu	4
(England) Adam Duffy	2
(England) Ricky Walden	1
(England) Stuart Bingham	4

Last 16; Best of 7 frames
(China) Yu Delu	1
(England) Stuart Bingham	4

===== Section 8 =====
Last 128; Best of 7 frames
(England) Barry Hawkins	4
(England) Craig Steadman	1
(Norway) Kurt Maflin	4
(England) Stuart Carrington	2
(England) Michael Holt	1
(England) Stephen Craigie	4
(England) Andrew Higginson	w/o
(India) Lucky Vatnani	w/d
(England) Mark Davis	4
(England) Mitchell Mann	1
(England) Jimmy Robertson	4
(China) Tian Pengfei	0
(Scotland) Graeme Dott	4
(Poland) Kacper Filipiak	0
(England) Mark Selby	4
(England) Alfie Burden	1

Last 64; Best of 7 frames
(England) Barry Hawkins	4
(Norway) Kurt Maflin	0
(England) Stephen Craigie	0
(England) Andrew Higginson	4
(England) Mark Davis	2
(England) Jimmy Robertson	4
(Scotland) Graeme Dott	0
(England) Mark Selby	4

Last 32; Best of 7 frames
(England) Barry Hawkins	4
(England) Andrew Higginson	2
(England) Jimmy Robertson	3
(England) Mark Selby	4

Last 16; Best of 7 frames
(England) Barry Hawkins	1
(England) Mark Selby	4

==== Finals ====
Quarter-finals; Best of 7 frames		Semi-finals; Best of 7 frames		Final; Best of 7 frames
(Scotland) John Higgins	3
(Northern Ireland) Mark Allen	4	(Northern Ireland) Mark Allen	3
(Australia) Neil Robertson	4	(Australia) Neil Robertson	4
(England) Ben Woollaston	0			(Australia) Neil Robertson	4
(England) Judd Trump	4			(England) Judd Trump	1
(Scotland) Alan McManus	2	(England) Judd Trump	4
(England) Stuart Bingham	3	(England) Mark Selby	1
(England) Mark Selby	4

== Century breaks ==
Only from last 128 onwards.

- 142, 131 – Ryan Day
- 138, 135, 112 – Judd Trump
- 137, 112, 109, 109, 100 – Neil Robertson
- 137, 108, 103 – Mark Selby
- 135, 109 – Stuart Bingham
- 132, 110, 100 – Martin Gould
- 132 – Simon Bedford
- 130 – Liu Song
- 128 – Liang Wenbo
- 125, 110, 107, 107 – Ricky Walden
- 125 – Ken Doherty
- 123 – Ali Carter
- 117 – Mark Joyce
- 107 – John Higgins
- 105 – Shaun Murphy
- 105 – Marco Fu
- 102 – Dave Harold
- 101 – Stephen Lee
- 100 – David Hogan
- 100 – Li Yan
