= Cue sports at the 2010 Asian Games – Men's snooker singles =

Cue sports events

Men's snooker singles at the 2010 Asian Games
- Venue: Asian Games Town Gymnasium
- Dates: 18–20 November 2010
- Competitors: 43 from 22 nations

Medalists
gold medal	Marco Fu	Hong Kong
silver medal	Ding Junhui	China
bronze medal	Dechawat Poomjaeng	Thailand
bronze medal	Aditya Mehta	India

The men's snooker singles tournament at the 2010 Asian Games in Guangzhou took place from 18 November to 20 November at Asian Games Town Gymnasium.

== Schedule ==
All times are China Standard Time (UTC+08:00)

Date	Time	Event
Thursday, 18 November 2010	10:00	Preliminary
Thursday, 18 November 2010	13:00	Last 32
Friday, 19 November 2010	13:00	Last 16
Friday, 19 November 2010	19:30	Quarterfinals
Saturday, 20 November 2010	13:00	Semifinals
Saturday, 20 November 2010	16:00	Final

== Results ==
Legend

- WO — Won by walkover

=== Finals ===
Semifinals			Final
1	Ding Junhui (CHN)	4
	Dechawat Poomjaeng (THA)	3	1	Ding Junhui (CHN)	2
	Aditya Mehta (IND)	1		Marco Fu (HKG)	4
	Marco Fu (HKG)	4

=== Top half ===
==== Section 1 ====
Preliminary
Mohamad Ali Berjaoui (LIB)	2
Lee Po-hsien (TPE)	4
Fung Kwok Wai (HKG)	4
Firas Kamel (IRQ)	2
Moh Keen Hoo (MAS)	2
Khurram Hussain Agha (PAK)	4

Last 32
1	Ding Junhui (CHN)	4
Lee Po-hsien (TPE)	0
Pankaj Advani (IND)	4
Ahmed Saif (QAT)	3
Marvin Lim (SIN)	0
Fung Kwok Wai (HKG)	4
Khurram Hussain Agha (PAK)	4
Meqdad Taqi (IOC)	0

Last 16
1	Ding Junhui (CHN)	4
Pankaj Advani (IND)	1
Fung Kwok Wai (HKG)	4
Khurram Hussain Agha (PAK)	1

Quarterfinals
1	Ding Junhui (CHN)	4
Fung Kwok Wai (HKG)	0

==== Section 2 ====
Preliminary
Omar Al-Ajlani (KSA)	0
Tüvshinjargalyn Khash-Ochir (MGL)	4
Hwang Chul-ho (KOR)	0
Dechawat Poomjaeng (THA)	4

Last 32
Karam Fatima (SYR)	4
Tüvshinjargalyn Khash-Ochir (MGL)	3
Saleh Mohammad (AFG)	4
Benjamin Guevarra (PHI)	3
Hossein Vafaei (IRI)	4
Lương Chí Dũng (VIE)	0
Dechawat Poomjaeng (THA)	4
4	Mohammed Shehab (UAE)	2

Last 16
Karam Fatima (SYR)	1
Saleh Mohammad (AFG)	4
Hossein Vafaei (IRI)	1
Dechawat Poomjaeng (THA)	4

Quarterfinals
Saleh Mohammad (AFG)	1
Dechawat Poomjaeng (THA)	4

=== Bottom half ===
==== Section 3 ====
Preliminary
Ali Al-Obaidly (QAT)	0
Wu Yu-lun (TPE)	4
Baek Min-hu (KOR)	WO
Ali Jalil (IRQ)
Mohammed Al-Jokar (UAE)	4
Abdullah Al-Kandari (IOC)	3

Last 32
3	Ratchapol Pu-ob-orm (THA)	3
Wu Yu-lun (TPE)	4
Mazen Berjaoui (LIB)	0
Aditya Mehta (IND)	4
Thor Chuan Leong (MAS)	4
Baek Min-hu (KOR)	1
Mohammed Al-Jokar (UAE)	3
Ang Boon Chin (SIN)	4

Last 16
Wu Yu-lun (TPE)	2
Aditya Mehta (IND)	4
Thor Chuan Leong (MAS)	2
Ang Boon Chin (SIN)	4

Quarterfinals
Aditya Mehta (IND)	4
Ang Boon Chin (SIN)	3

==== Section 4 ====
Preliminary
Marlon Manalo (PHI)	1
Marco Fu (HKG)	4
Mohammad Rais Senzahi (AFG)	4
Kubanychbek Sagyndykov (KGZ)	0
Omar Al-Kojah (SYR)	4
Đỗ Hoàng Quân (VIE)	2

Last 32
Soheil Vahedi (IRI)	0
Marco Fu (HKG)	4
Mohammad Rais Senzahi (AFG)	1
Muhammad Sajjad (PAK)	4
Baldandorjiin Batsükh (MGL)	3
Ahmed Aseeri (KSA)	4
Omar Al-Kojah (SYR)	1
2	Liang Wenbo (CHN)	4

Last 16
Marco Fu (HKG)	4
Muhammad Sajjad (PAK)	0
Ahmed Aseeri (KSA)	0
2	Liang Wenbo (CHN)	4

Quarterfinals
Marco Fu (HKG)	4
2	Liang Wenbo (CHN)	1
