= European Tour 2014/2015 – Event 2 =

European Tour 2014/2015 Event 2

Tournament information
- Dates: 20–24 August 2014
- Venue: Stadthalle
- City: Fürth
- Country: Germany
- Organisation: World Snooker
- Format: Minor-ranking event
- Total prize fund: €126,877
- Winner's share: €25,000
- Highest break: Aditya Mehta (IND) (147)

Final
- Champion: Mark Allen (NIR)
- Runner-up: Judd Trump (ENG)
- Score: 4–2

The European Tour 2014/2015 – Event 2 (also known as the 2014 Arcaden Paul Hunter Classic) was a professional minor-ranking snooker tournament that took place between 20 and 24 August 2014 in Fürth, Germany.

Aditya Mehta made the 106th official maximum break during his last 32 match against Stephen Maguire. Mehta became the first Indian player to compile an official 147.

Ronnie O'Sullivan was the defending champion, but he lost 2–4 against Tian Pengfei in the last 16.

Mark Allen won his seventh professional title by defeating Judd Trump 4–2 in the final.

== Prize fund ==
The breakdown of prize money of the event is shown below:

	Prize fund
Winner	€25,000
Runner-up	€12,000
Semi-finalist	€6,000
Quarter-finalist	€4,000
Last 16	€2,300
Last 32	€1,200
Last 64	€700
Maximum break	€1,877
Total	€126,877

== Main draw ==
=== Preliminary rounds ===
==== Round 1 ====
Best of 7 frames

(Republic of Ireland) Josh Boileau	4–1	(Malta) Brian Cini
(England) Luke Garland	4–0	(Netherlands) Jerom Meeus
(Northern Ireland) Billy Brown	3–4	(Belgium) Wan Chooi Tan
(Germany) Ali Masoudi Alavi	0–4	(Wales) Duane Jones
(Wales) Kishan Hirani	4–0	(Germany) Thomas Kiesewetter
(Germany) Anton Woywod	0–4	(England) Reanne Evans
(Germany) Jan Leichs	0–4	(England) Kobi Mates
(Scotland) Eden Sharav	4–0	(England) Adam Bobat
(Germany) Norbert Hofheinz	0–4	(England) Ryan Causton
(England) Chris Jones	1–4	(Wales) Daniel Wells
(England) Matthew Glasby	0–4	(England) Adam Duffy
(Austria) Gerry Egger	0–4	(Germany) Luca Kaufmann
(Croatia) Sanjin Kusan	0–4	(France) Stephane Ochoiski
(Belgium) Hans Blanckaert	4–1	(Germany) Fabian Tost
(Netherlands) Kevin Chan	1–4	(England) Mitchell Travis
(England) Zack Richardson	w/o–n/s	(Portugal) Filipe Cardoso
(England) Ashley Carty	4–0	(Germany) Matthias Porn
(England) Simon Dent	4–0	(Netherlands) Manon Melief
(Belgium) Jurian Heusdens	4–3	(Belgium) Kristof Vermeiren
(Republic of Ireland) Thomas Dowling	4–1	(Belgium) Steve Lambrechts
(Germany) Carl Rosenberger	w/o–w/d	(Germany) Nils Hartung

(Wales) Jack Bradford	4–0	(Germany) Stefan Gerst
(England) Christopher Keogan	4–1	(Belgium) Jeff Jacobs
(Germany) Nicole Breitenstein	0–4	(Wales) Gareth Allen
(England) Joe Steele	4–2	(Germany) Simon Lichtenberg
(England) Michael Williams	4–0	(Austria) Rick Kraaijeveld
(England) Sydney Wilson	3–4	(England) Paul Davison
(Germany) Vyacheslav Nikiforov	3–4	(Germany) Stefan Schenk
(Israel) Shachar Ruberg	0–4	(Republic of Ireland) John Sutton
(Austria) Andreas Ploner	4–0	(Germany) Ralf Günzel
(Germany) Ralph Müller	0–4	(England) Martin O'Donnell
(Belgium) Thomas Broeckx	0–4	(Scotland) Marc Davis
(Netherlands) Raymon Fabrie	2–4	(Northern Ireland) Jordan Brown
(Germany) Diana Schuler	0–4	(Scotland) Michael Collumb
(England) William Lemons	4–0	(England) Jayson Wholey
(Pakistan) Umar Ali Shaikh	0–4	(Scotland) Ross Higgins
(Belgium) Tomasz Skalski	4–1	(Austria) Manuel Pomwenger
(Scotland) Mark Owens	1–4	(Wales) Jamie Clarke
(Wales) Ben Jones	4–2	(England) Matthew Day
(Wales) Alex Taubman	4–0	(Germany) Robert Drahn
(Romania) Corina Maracine	0–4	(Scotland) Dylan Craig

==== Round 2 ====
Best of 7 frames

(Belgium) Wendy Jans	0–4	(Republic of Ireland) Josh Boileau
(England) Luke Garland	4–3	(Belgium) Wan Chooi Tan
(Germany) Daniel Schneider	0–4	(Wales) Duane Jones
(Germany) Phil Barnes	0–4	(Wales) Kishan Hirani
(Thailand) Prasit Buttakham	1–4	(England) Reanne Evans
(England) Sanderson Lam	4–0	(England) Kobi Mates
(Turkey) Ali Kirim	0–4	(Scotland) Eden Sharav
(Germany) Lukas Kleckers	2–4	(England) Ryan Causton
(England) Joe O'Connor	4–3	(Wales) Daniel Wells
(England) Jamie Bodle	1–4	(England) Adam Duffy
(Germany) Luca Kaufmann	4–1	(France) Stephane Ochoiski
(Germany) Andreas Hartung	2–4	(Belgium) Hans Blanckaert
(England) Oliver Brown	2–4	(England) Mitchell Travis
(Northern Ireland) Declan Brennan	2–4	(England) Zack Richardson
(England) Sean O'Sullivan	3–4	(England) Ashley Carty
(England) Jeff Cundy	4–1	(England) Simon Dent
(Belgium) Jurian Heusdens	0–4	(Republic of Ireland) Thomas Dowling

(England) Saqib Nasir	4–0	(Germany) Carl Rosenberger
(England) Sam Harvey	2–4	(Wales) Jack Bradford
(Germany) Gerhard Engelschalk	0–4	(England) Christopher Keogan
(Germany) Bernd Strnad	0–4	(Wales) Gareth Allen
(Germany) Sascha Lippe	4–0	(England) Joe Steele
(Austria) Benjamin Buser	0–4	(England) Michael Williams
(England) Paul Davison	4–0	(Germany) Stefan Schenk
(Republic of Ireland) John Sutton	2–4	(Austria) Andreas Ploner
(Germany) Sebastian Thron	0–4	(England) Martin O'Donnell
(Germany) Patrick Einsle	3–4	(Scotland) Marc Davis
(Northern Ireland) Jordan Brown	3–4	(Scotland) Michael Collumb
(England) Jamie O'Neill	w/d–w/o	(England) William Lemons
(Austria) Markus Pfistermüller	1–4	(Scotland) Ross Higgins
(Belgium) Tomasz Skalski	2–4	(Wales) Jamie Clarke
(England) Ashley Hugill	1–4	(Wales) Ben Jones
(Scotland) Rhys Clark	3–4	(Wales) Alex Taubman
(England) Matthew Hulatt	0–4	(Scotland) Dylan Craig

==== Round 3 ====
Best of 7 frames

(Republic of Ireland) Josh Boileau	2–4	(England) Luke Garland
(Wales) Duane Jones	3–4	(Wales) Kishan Hirani
(England) Reanne Evans	0–4	(England) Sanderson Lam
(Scotland) Eden Sharav	4–2	(England) Ryan Causton
(England) Joe O'Connor	1–4	(England) Adam Duffy
(Germany) Luca Kaufmann	2–4	(Belgium) Hans Blanckaert
(England) Mitchell Travis	4–0	(England) Zack Richardson
(England) Ashley Carty	0–4	(England) Jeff Cundy
(Republic of Ireland) Thomas Dowling	4–2	(England) Saqib Nasir

(Wales) Jack Bradford	4–2	(England) Christopher Keogan
(Wales) Gareth Allen	4–3	(Germany) Sascha Lippe
(England) Michael Williams	1–4	(England) Paul Davison
(Austria) Andreas Ploner	3–4	(England) Martin O'Donnell
(Scotland) Marc Davis	3–4	(Scotland) Michael Collumb
(England) William Lemons	4–1	(Scotland) Ross Higgins
(Wales) Jamie Clarke	4–1	(Wales) Ben Jones
(Wales) Alex Taubman	4–1	(Scotland) Dylan Craig

=== Main rounds ===
==== Top half ====
===== Section 1 =====
Last 128; Best of 7 frames
(England) Mark Selby	4
(Switzerland) Alexander Ursenbacher	0
(Wales) Dominic Dale	4
(England) Oliver Lines	1
(England) Shaun Murphy	4
(England) Luke Garland	1
(England) Mark Joyce	4
(China) Lu Ning	0
(Wales) Jak Jones	4
(Wales) Kishan Hirani	3
(England) Liam Highfield	4
(China) Cao Xinlong	0
(England) Andrew Higginson	2
(China) Liang Wenbo	4
(England) Mark Davis	4
(England) Sanderson Lam	0

Last 64; Best of 7 frames
(England) Mark Selby	4
(Wales) Dominic Dale	0
(England) Shaun Murphy	4
(England) Mark Joyce	1
(Wales) Jak Jones	2
(England) Liam Highfield	4
(China) Liang Wenbo	4
(England) Mark Davis	3

Last 32; Best of 7 frames
(England) Mark Selby	4
(England) Shaun Murphy	3
(England) Liam Highfield	2
(China) Liang Wenbo	4

Last 16; Best of 7 frames
(England) Mark Selby	4
(China) Liang Wenbo	1

===== Section 2 =====
Last 128; Best of 7 frames
(England) Chris Wakelin	4
(Scotland) Eden Sharav	1
(England) Michael Wasley	4
(England) David Grace	1
(England) Allan Taylor	4
(England) Tom Ford	2
(England) Ricky Walden	4
(Wales) Andrew Pagett	2
(Wales) Ryan Day	3
(England) Adam Duffy	4
(Northern Ireland) Gerard Greene	4
(England) Peter Lines	2
(Republic of Ireland) Fergal O'Brien	4
(Republic of Ireland) David Morris	2
(Hong Kong) Marco Fu	4
(Belgium) Hans Blanckaert	0

Last 64; Best of 7 frames
(England) Chris Wakelin	4
(England) Michael Wasley	2
(England) Allan Taylor	1
(England) Ricky Walden	4
(England) Adam Duffy	4
(Northern Ireland) Gerard Greene	3
(Republic of Ireland) Fergal O'Brien	4
(Hong Kong) Marco Fu	2

Last 32; Best of 7 frames
(England) Chris Wakelin	3
(England) Ricky Walden	4
(England) Adam Duffy	0
(Republic of Ireland) Fergal O'Brien	4

Last 16; Best of 7 frames
(England) Ricky Walden	4
(Republic of Ireland) Fergal O'Brien	2

===== Section 3 =====
Last 128; Best of 7 frames
(England) Judd Trump	w/o
(China) Zhou Yuelong	w/d
(England) Anthony Hamilton	4
(England) Steven Hallworth	2
(Malta) Tony Drago	4
(England) Lee Page	0
(England) Nigel Bond	0
(England) Mitchell Travis	4
(England) Jimmy White	4
(Qatar) Ahmed Saif	0
(Scotland) Stephen Maguire	4
(England) Hammad Miah	1
(Thailand) Thepchaiya Un-Nooh	4
(Australia) Steve Mifsud	0
(India) Aditya Mehta	4
(England) Jeff Cundy	3

Last 64; Best of 7 frames
(England) Judd Trump	4
(England) Anthony Hamilton	0
(Malta) Tony Drago	1
(England) Mitchell Travis	4
(England) Jimmy White	1
(Scotland) Stephen Maguire	4
(Thailand) Thepchaiya Un-Nooh	3
(India) Aditya Mehta	4

Last 32; Best of 7 frames
(England) Judd Trump	4
(England) Mitchell Travis	3
(Scotland) Stephen Maguire	4
(India) Aditya Mehta	2

Last 16; Best of 7 frames
(England) Judd Trump	4
(Scotland) Stephen Maguire	2

===== Section 4 =====
Last 128; Best of 7 frames
(England) Matthew Selt	4
(England) Alfie Burden	1
(England) Michael Georgiou	3
(China) Tian Pengfei	4
(England) Chris Melling	4
(China) Cao Yupeng	2
(England) Mike Dunn	4
(England) Ian Burns	1
(Thailand) Noppon Saengkham	0
(England) Ronnie O'Sullivan	4
(England) Robbie Williams	4
(Republic of Ireland) Thomas Dowling	1
(Scotland) Michael Leslie	4
(Wales) Jack Bradford	2
(England) Barry Hawkins	4
(Wales) Gareth Allen	1

Last 64; Best of 7 frames
(England) Matthew Selt	1
(China) Tian Pengfei	4
(England) Chris Melling	0
(England) Mike Dunn	4
(England) Ronnie O'Sullivan	4
(England) Robbie Williams	0
(Scotland) Michael Leslie	2
(England) Barry Hawkins	4

Last 32; Best of 7 frames
(China) Tian Pengfei	4
(England) Mike Dunn	3
(England) Ronnie O'Sullivan	4
(England) Barry Hawkins	1

Last 16; Best of 7 frames
(China) Tian Pengfei	4
(England) Ronnie O'Sullivan	2

==== Bottom half ====
===== Section 5 =====
Last 128; Best of 7 frames
(Scotland) Anthony McGill	4
(England) Mitchell Mann	1
(England) David Gilbert	4
(England) Craig Steadman	2
(Australia) Neil Robertson	4
(England) Elliot Slessor	3
(England) Jimmy Robertson	4
(Australia) Vinnie Calabrese	3
(England) Kyren Wilson	3
(England) Paul Davison	4
(Thailand) Dechawat Poomjaeng	4
(China) Lu Chenwei	2
(England) Jack Lisowski	4
(England) Stuart Carrington	2
(Scotland) Graeme Dott	4
(England) Martin O'Donnell	1

Last 64; Best of 7 frames
(Scotland) Anthony McGill	4
(England) David Gilbert	2
(Australia) Neil Robertson	4
(England) Jimmy Robertson	0
(England) Paul Davison	3
(Thailand) Dechawat Poomjaeng	4
(England) Jack Lisowski	3
(Scotland) Graeme Dott	4

Last 32; Best of 7 frames
(Scotland) Anthony McGill	3
(Australia) Neil Robertson	4
(Thailand) Dechawat Poomjaeng	4
(Scotland) Graeme Dott	1

Last 16; Best of 7 frames
(Australia) Neil Robertson	2
(Thailand) Dechawat Poomjaeng	4

===== Section 6 =====
Last 128; Best of 7 frames
(Wales) Mark Williams	3
(England) Rod Lawler	4
(England) Sam Baird	4
(China) Yu Delu	1
(England) James Cahill	4
(England) Dave Harold	1
(Scotland) John Higgins	4
(England) Zak Surety	2
(England) Mark King	4
(Scotland) Michael Collumb	2
(Wales) Jamie Jones	4
(China) Lyu Haotian	1
(Scotland) Ross Muir	3
(Wales) Matthew Stevens	4
(England) Stuart Bingham	0
(Scotland) Fraser Patrick	4

Last 64; Best of 7 frames
(England) Rod Lawler	4
(England) Sam Baird	2
(England) James Cahill	4
(Scotland) John Higgins	2
(England) Mark King	1
(Wales) Jamie Jones	4
(Wales) Matthew Stevens	3
(Scotland) Fraser Patrick	4

Last 32; Best of 7 frames
(England) Rod Lawler	4
(England) James Cahill	3
(Wales) Jamie Jones	1
(Scotland) Fraser Patrick	4

Last 16; Best of 7 frames
(England) Rod Lawler	4
(Scotland) Fraser Patrick	0

===== Section 7 =====
Last 128; Best of 7 frames
(Scotland) Alan McManus	4
(England) William Lemons	1
(England) Gary Wilson	4
(England) Steve Davis	2
(Norway) Kurt Maflin	0
(China) Li Hang	4
(Northern Ireland) Joe Swail	2
(Scotland) Scott Donaldson	4
(England) Michael Holt	0
(China) Xiao Guodong	4
(England) Alex Davies	0
(England) Joel Walker	4
(England) Jamie Cope	4
(England) Barry Pinches	3
(England) Ben Woollaston	2
(Wales) Jamie Clarke	4

Last 64; Best of 7 frames
(Scotland) Alan McManus	4
(England) Gary Wilson	2
(China) Li Hang	3
(Scotland) Scott Donaldson	4
(China) Xiao Guodong	4
(England) Joel Walker	0
(England) Jamie Cope	4
(Wales) Jamie Clarke	2

Last 32; Best of 7 frames
(Scotland) Alan McManus	4
(Scotland) Scott Donaldson	1
(China) Xiao Guodong	4
(England) Jamie Cope	3

Last 16; Best of 7 frames
(Scotland) Alan McManus	4
(China) Xiao Guodong	2

===== Section 8 =====
Last 128; Best of 7 frames
(England) Robert Milkins	4
(England) Chris Norbury	1
(England) John Astley	1
(Wales) Alex Taubman	4
(England) Martin Gould	4
(England) Ryan Clark	0
(Wales) Michael White	w/o
(Scotland) Marcus Campbell	w/d
(England) Ian Glover	0
(Thailand) Ratchayothin Yotharuck	4
(Belgium) Luca Brecel	w/o
(Republic of Ireland) Ken Doherty	w/d
(England) Rory McLeod	1
(Malta) Alex Borg	4
(Northern Ireland) Mark Allen	4
(Wales) Lee Walker	1

Last 64; Best of 7 frames
(England) Robert Milkins	4
(Wales) Alex Taubman	0
(England) Martin Gould	1
(Wales) Michael White	4
(Thailand) Ratchayothin Yotharuck	0
(Belgium) Luca Brecel	4
(Malta) Alex Borg	1
(Northern Ireland) Mark Allen	4

Last 32; Best of 7 frames
(England) Robert Milkins	4
(Wales) Michael White	3
(Belgium) Luca Brecel	2
(Northern Ireland) Mark Allen	4

Last 16; Best of 7 frames
(England) Robert Milkins	1
(Northern Ireland) Mark Allen	4

==== Finals ====
Quarter-finals; Best of 7 frames		Semi-finals; Best of 7 frames		Final; Best of 7 frames
(England) Mark Selby	3
(England) Ricky Walden	4	(England) Ricky Walden	1
(England) Judd Trump	4	(England) Judd Trump	4
(China) Tian Pengfei	3			(England) Judd Trump	2
(Thailand) Dechawat Poomjaeng	2			(Northern Ireland) Mark Allen	4
(England) Rod Lawler	4	(England) Rod Lawler	3
(Scotland) Alan McManus	3	(Northern Ireland) Mark Allen	4
(Northern Ireland) Mark Allen	4

== Century breaks ==
- 147 – Aditya Mehta
- 143, 111, 108, 106, 104 – Judd Trump
- 141, 132, 107 – Stephen Maguire
- 139, 102 – Mark Allen
- 132 – Paul Davison
- 131, 113 – Ricky Walden
- 130 – Mark Joyce
- 129, 101 – Li Hang
- 124, 106, 102 – Anthony McGill
- 123 – Xiao Guodong
- 122 – Neil Robertson
- 121, 107 – Mark Selby
- 121 – Andrew Higginson
- 120, 112 – Tian Pengfei
- 118 – David Gilbert
- 116 – Jimmy White
- 114, 105, 101 – Ronnie O'Sullivan
- 114 – Marco Fu
- 109 – Robert Milkins
- 108 – Martin O'Donnell
- 105 – Reanne Evans
- 104 – Martin Gould
- 103 – Daniel Wells
- 102 – Jamie Cope
- 101 – Graeme Dott
- 100 – Mike Dunn
