= Snooker at the 2013 World Games – men's singles =

Snooker men's singles at the 2013 World Games
- Venue: Unidad Deportiva Alberto Galindo, Cali, Colombia
- Dates: 26–30 July 2013
- Competitors: 16 from 11 nations

Medalists
gold medal	(India) Aditya Mehta
silver medal	(China) Liang Wenbo
bronze medal	(Thailand) Dechawat Poomjaeng

The men's singles snooker competition at the 2013 World Games took place from 26 to 30 July at the Unidad Deportiva Alberto Galindo in Cali, Colombia.

== Bracket ==
Round of 16
(Republic of Ireland) Brendan O'Donoghue	2
(United Kingdom) Joe Perry	3
(Guatemala) Luis Lemus	0
(India) Aditya Mehta	3
(Brazil) Pedro Rolim Bohm	0
(Thailand) Dechawat Poomjaeng	3
(United States) Ajeya Prabhakar	1
(India) Pankaj Advani	3
(South Africa) Peter Francisco	2
(United Kingdom) Nigel Bond	3
(Thailand) Noppon Saengkham	1
(China) Liang Wenbo	3
(China) Lyu Haotian	3
(Iran) Hossein Vafaei	0
(Malta) Alex Borg	1
(Brazil) Igor Figueiredo	3

Quarter-finals
(United Kingdom) Joe Perry	2
(India) Aditya Mehta	3
(Thailand) Dechawat Poomjaeng	3
(India) Pankaj Advani	1
(United Kingdom) Nigel Bond	0
(China) Liang Wenbo	3
(China) Lyu Haotian	1
(Brazil) Igor Figueiredo	3

Semi-finals
(India) Aditya Mehta	3
(Thailand) Dechawat Poomjaeng	1
(China) Liang Wenbo	3
(Brazil) Igor Figueiredo	0

Final
(India) Aditya Mehta	3
(China) Liang Wenbo	0
Third place
(Thailand) Dechawat Poomjaeng	3
(Brazil) Igor Figueiredo	2
