= Cue sports at the 2013 World Games =

Event class at the 2013 world games

The cue sports competition at the 2013 World Games, including three-cushion billiards, nine-ball (a pool discipline) and snooker, took place from July 26 to 30 at the Unidad Deportiva Alberto Galindo in Cali, Colombia.

== Medal table ==
Rank	Nation	Gold	Silver	Bronze	Total
1	Chinese Taipei (TPE)	1	1	0	2
2	Great Britain (GBR)	1	0	1	2
3	India (IND)	1	0	0	1
3	Italy (ITA)	1	0	0	1
5	Belgium (BEL)	0	1	0	1
5	China (CHN)	0	1	0	1
5	South Korea (KOR)	0	1	0	1
8	Netherlands (NLD)	0	0	1	1
8	Philippines (PHI)	0	0	1	1
8	Thailand (THA)	0	0	1	1
Totals (10 entries)		4	4	4	12

== Medals summary ==
Event	Gold	Silver	Bronze
Three-cushion billiards – men's singles	Marco Zanetti (ITA)	Eddy Merckx (BEL)	Glenn Hofman (NED)
Nine-ball – men's singles	Darren Appleton (GBR)	Chang Jung-lin (TPE)	Dennis Orcollo (PHI)
Nine-ball – women's singles	Chou Chieh-yu (TPE)	Kim Ga-young (KOR)	Kelly Fisher (GBR)
Snooker – men's singles	Aditya Mehta (IND)	Liang Wenbo (CHN)	Dechawat Poomjaeng (THA)
