= Dechawat Poomjaeng =

Thai snooker player (born 1978)

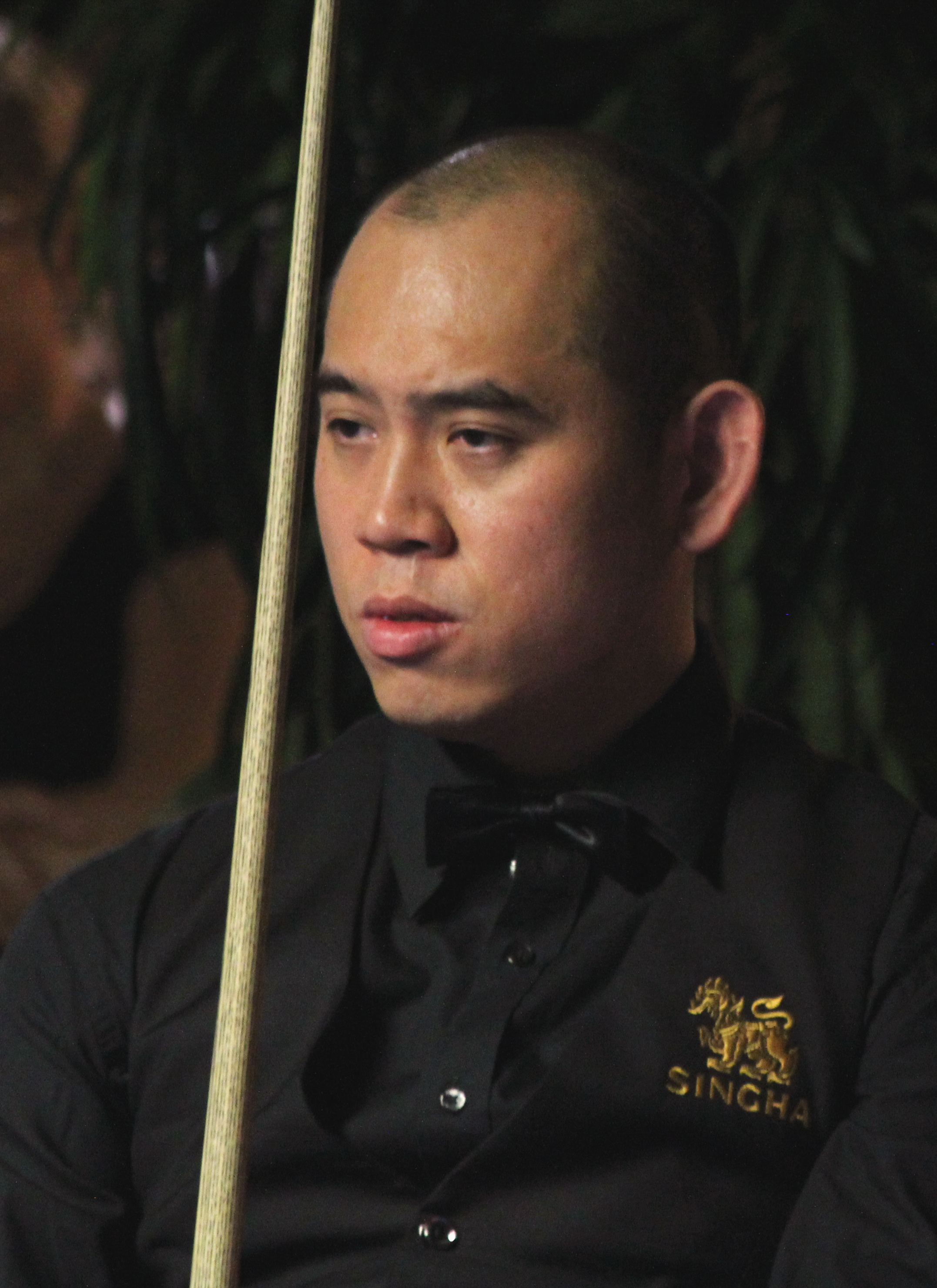
- Paul Hunter Classic 2016

Personal information
- Nickname: Mr. Poombastic
- Born: July 11, 1978 (age 48) Bangkok, Thailand

Sport
- Country: Thailand
- Sport: Snooker
- Professional: 2011–2017, 2022–2024
- Highest ranking: 37 (March–April 2015)
- Maximum breaks: 1 (2014 German Masters)
- Best ranking finish: Last 16 (x3)
Medal record
Men's snooker
Representing Thailand
Asian Games
Bronze medal – third place	2010 Guangzhou	Singles
World Games
Bronze medal – third place	2013 Cali	Singles

Dechawat Poomjaeng (Thai: เดชาวัต พุ่มแจ้ง Dechāwạt Phùmcæ̂ng, born July 11, 1978) is a Thai former professional snooker player.

== Career ==
=== Early career ===
He won the 2010 IBSF World Snooker Championship in Damascus, Syria, defeating India's Pankaj Advani 10–7 in the final. This earned him a place on the professional Main Tour for the 2011–12 season.

=== Debut season ===
Due to being a new player on the tour and therefore unranked he would need to win four qualifying matches to reach the ranking event main draws. He came closest to doing this in the World Open when he beat Andrew Pagett and Liu Song, before losing to Michael Holt 4–5.

Poomjaeng played all 12 of the minor-ranking Players Tour Championship events throughout the season, with his best finish coming in Event 8 where he beat seven-time world champion Stephen Hendry and Stephen Maguire to reach the last 16, but succumbed 1–4 to Ben Woollaston. Poomjaeng finished the season ranked world number 82, comfortably outside the top 64 who retain their places for the 2012–13 season. However, his final placing of 57th on the PTC Order of Merit was good enough to earn him a spot for next season.

=== 2012/2013 season ===
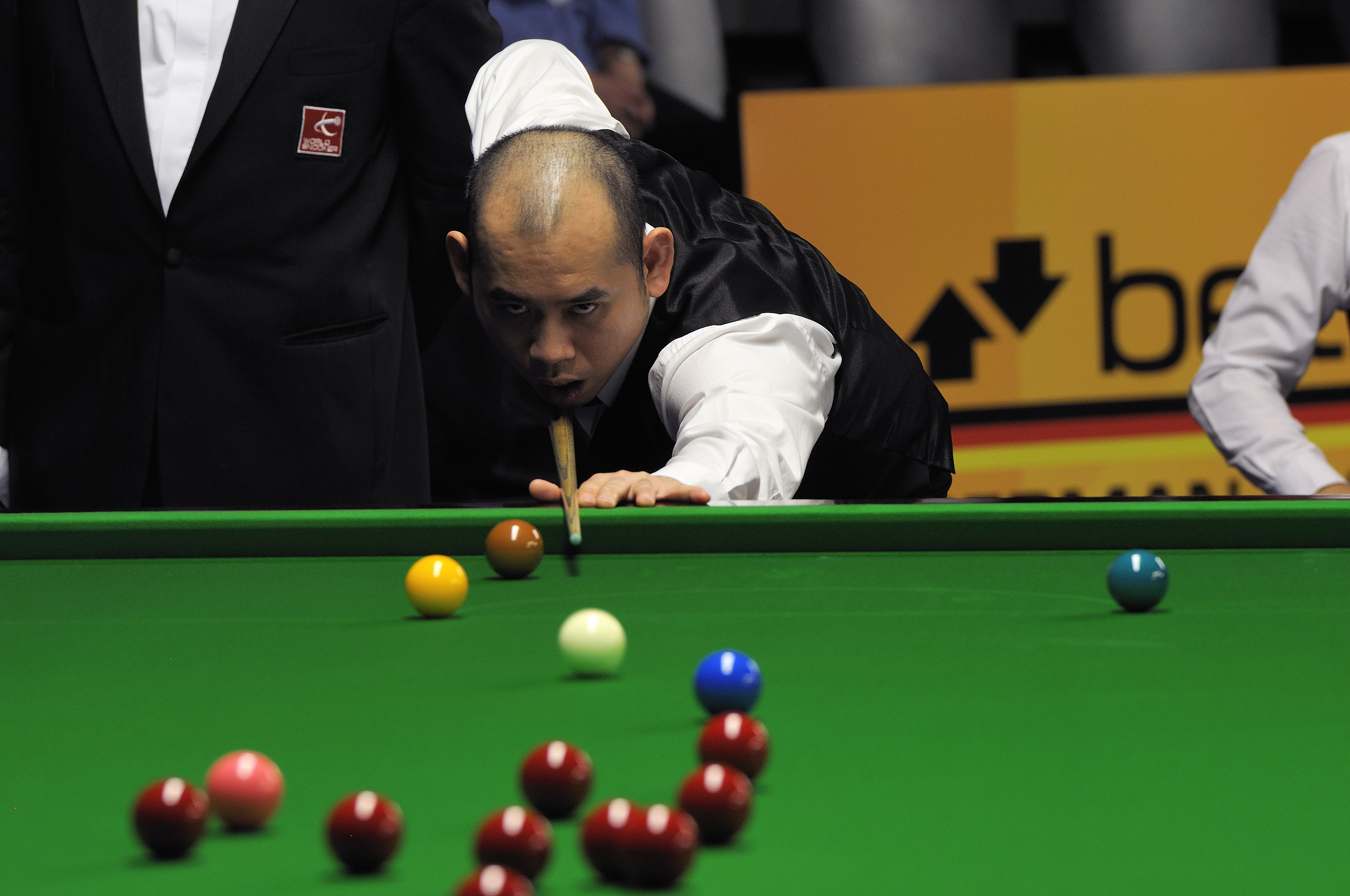
Poomjaeng at the 2013 German Masters

The 2012–13 season saw Poomjaeng qualify for the main draw of a ranking event for the first time. This came in the 2013 German Masters, by defeating Yu Delu and Fergal O'Brien. He lost 2–5 to Barry Hawkins in the first round in Berlin. Poomjaeng continued his form by winning four matches to reach the China Open. Once at the venue in Beijing, he saw off Zhu Yinghui 5–2 in the wildcard round, but then lost 3–5 to Mark Davis in the first round. In the Players Tour Championship events this season Poomjaeng's best results were last 16 defeats in the First and Fourth events, losing to Alan McManus and Mark Joyce respectively. He was ranked 42nd on the PTC Order of Merit. Poomjaeng beat Michael Leslie 10–4, Liu Chuang 10–9, Anthony Hamilton 10–4 and Jamie Cope 10–3 to qualify for the World Championship for the first time. He faced sixth seed Stephen Maguire in the first round and produced a huge shock with the world number 70 Poomjaeng winning 10–9, with a composed 63 break in the final frame. The crowd warmed to Poomjaeng as he walked to the wrong table at the start of play and animatedly expressed his emotions throughout the match, including applauding his own safety shot. He played Michael White in the second round and lost the fourth frame without a ball having been potted due to missing the reds three times. The rules of snooker state that if a red can be seen full ball and is missed on three consecutive shots, the frame is conceded. Poomjaeng lost the session 1–7 and went on to be defeated 3–13. Poomjaeng finished the season ranked world number 67.

=== 2013/2014 season ===
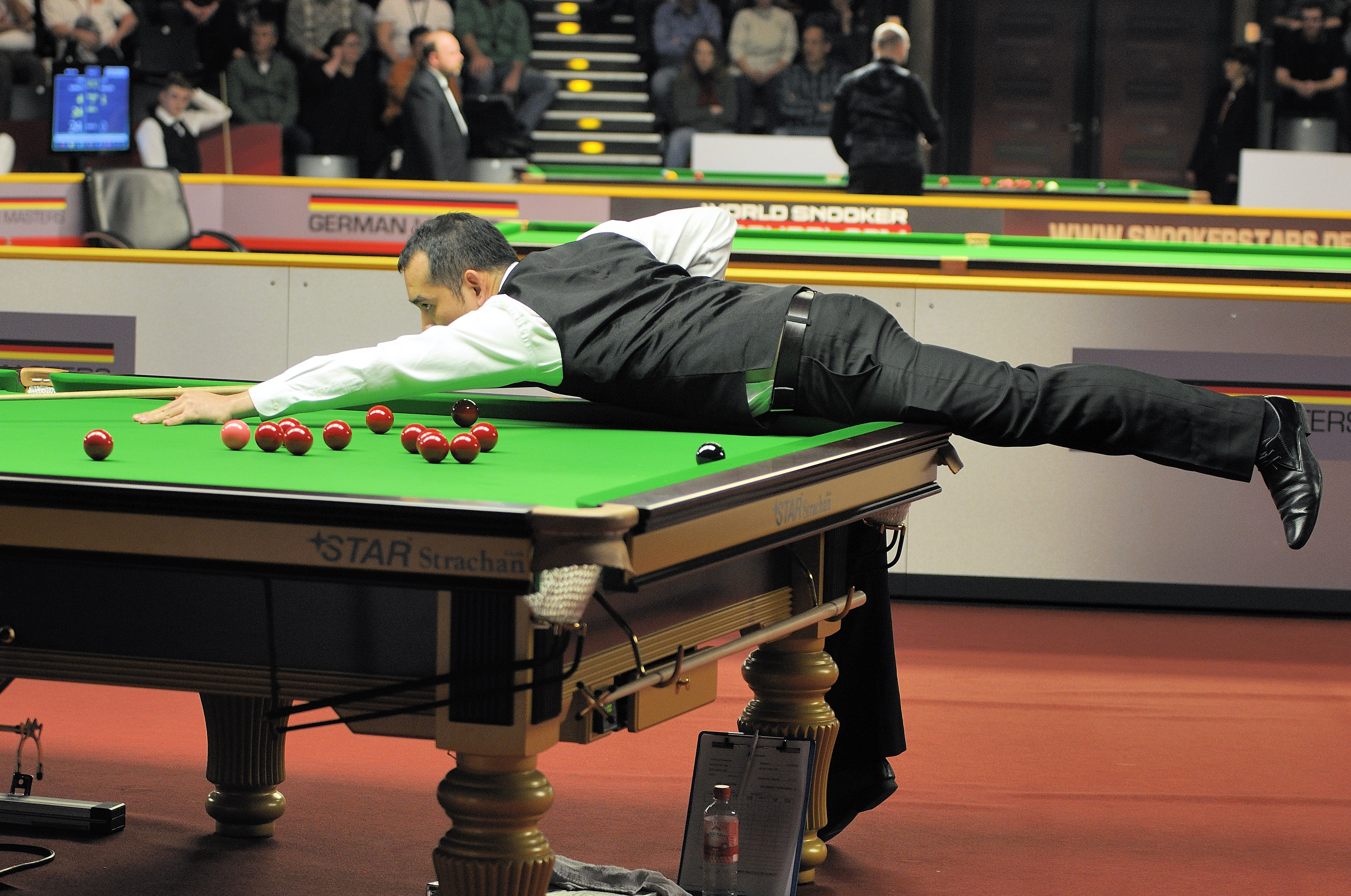
Poomjaeng at the 2014 German Masters

In his opening match of the season, Poomjaeng defeated Darren Cook 5–1 to qualify for the 2013 Wuxi Classic in China where he beat Dominic Dale 5–1 in the first round, before losing by a reverse of this scoreline to John Higgins. Poomjaeng then won three matches to qualify for the Australian Goldfields Open, but lost 5–1 to Barry Hawkins in the first round. Poomjaeng won the bronze medal at the World Games thanks to a 3–2 victory over Brazil's Igor Figueiredo. He lost in the last 32 of the Indian Open to Liang Wenbo and at the UK Championship, lost 6–0 in the second round to world number four Judd Trump, having defeated fellow Thai player Thepchaiya Un-Nooh 6–5 in the opening round. Poomjaeng eliminated defending champion Ali Carter 5–4 in the opening round of the German Masters, after having trailed 4–2, but was then beaten in a deciding frame by Xiao Guodong in the second round. His fourth exit in the last 32 of a ranking event this season came at the China Open as Shaun Murphy whitewashed him 5–0. Poomjaeng saw off Zhang Anda and Craig Steadman to stand one match away from playing in the World Championship for the second year in a row, but from 4–2 ahead he lost eight of the last nine frames against 1997 champion Ken Doherty to miss out. He rose 20 spots to be ranked world number 47 at the end of the season.

=== 2014/2015 season ===
At the Paul Hunter Classic, Poomjaeng won three matches and then defeated Neil Robertson 4–2 to reach the quarter-finals where he lost 4–2 to Rod Lawler. This result would later help him finish 32nd on the Order of Merit. Poomjaeng's first appearance at a ranking event this season was at the International Championship, but he was beaten 6–2 by Mark Davis in the first round. At the UK Championship he recorded wins over Andrew Norman and Michael Holt, before Marco Fu knocked him out 6–3 in the third round. Fu also eliminated Poomjaeng in the second round of the Welsh Open this time 4–2. Poomjaeng won three frames in a row from 3–1 down against Robertson in the first round of the China Open with the match eventually going into a deciding frame. Poomjaeng took it on the final black and then whitewashed Jack Lisowski 5–0 to play in the last 16 of a ranking event for the only time this season, where he lost 5–1 against Gary Wilson.

=== 2015/2016 season ===
Poomjaeng was narrowly beaten 6–5 by Michael White in the first round of the International Championship. He defeated Chris Melling 6–4 and Ryan Day 6–2 at the UK Championship and recovered from 5–0 down against Mark Joyce to win 6–5 and reach the fourth round. He potted just 13 points in the first five frames against Mark Selby and there was no comeback this time as he lost 6–1. A pair of 4–1 victories over Craig Steadman and Robert Milkins saw Poomjaeng reach the third round of the Welsh Open, where he was beaten 4–3 by Yu Delu. Poomjaeng lost 5–4 to Ryan Day in the first round of the China Open, but saw off Eden Sharav 10–4 and Robin Hull 10–5 to reach the final qualifying round for the World Championship. He fell just short of playing at the Crucible again as he lost 10–9 to Mitchell Mann.

=== 2016/2017 season ===
Poomjaeng had an extremely poor 2016–17 season. He did not get past the last 64 of a single event and was on a losing run of 11 matches until he beat Chen Zhe 10–7 in World Championship qualifying. Poomjaeng lost 10–4 to Graeme Dott in the next round and finished 70th in the rankings having started the season 45th. He did not enter Q School and has therefore been relegated from the snooker tour.

He entered Q School in 2018 and lost in the final round of the first event to Sam Craigie and then lost again in the final round of the second event to Zhao Xintong

=== 2022/2023 season ===
Poomjaeng returned to the tour through Q School Asia-Oceania Event 2.

=== 2023/2024 season ===
On 30 October 2023, he announced he will not return to the tour during his existing two-year tour card for personal reasons.

== Personal life ==
During his time as a professional, Poomjaeng was based at the Star Academy in Sheffield and shared a house with four other Thai players, including former world number three James Wattana, whom Poomjaeng has described as "a big brother".
His elder brother is Suchakree "Kwan" Poomjaeng, who has played on the professional snooker tour in the past.

== Performance and rankings timeline ==
Tournament	2011/ 12	2012/ 13	2013/ 14	2014/ 15	2015/ 16	2016/ 17	2018/ 19	2022/ 23	2023/ 24
Ranking (Note: Shows the ranking at the beginning of the season.)	(Note: New players on the Main Tour don't have a ranking)	(Note: Players qualified through Players Tour Championship Order of Merit started the season without ranking points)	67	47	43	45	(Note: He was an amateur)		86
Ranking tournaments
Championship League	Non-Ranking Event							A	A
European Masters	Tournament Not Held					LQ	LQ	A	A
British Open	Tournament Not Held							A	A
English Open	Tournament Not Held					1R	A	1R	A
Wuhan Open	Tournament Not Held								A
Northern Ireland Open	Tournament Not Held					1R	A	A	A
International Championship	NH	LQ	LQ	1R	1R	LQ	A	NH	A
UK Championship	LQ	LQ	2R	3R	4R	1R	1R	LQ	A
Shoot Out	Non-Ranking Event					1R	A	4R	A
Scottish Open	NH	MR	Not Held			1R	1R	A	A
World Grand Prix	Not Held			NR	DNQ	DNQ	DNQ	DNQ	DNQ
German Masters	LQ	1R	2R	LQ	LQ	LQ	LQ	LQ	A
Welsh Open	WD	LQ	2R	2R	3R	1R	A	LQ	A
Players Championship (Note: The event was called the Players Tour Championship Grand Final (2011/2012–2015/2016))	DNQ	DNQ	DNQ	DNQ	DNQ	DNQ	DNQ	DNQ	DNQ
World Open	LQ	LQ	LQ	Not Held		LQ	LQ	NH	A
Tour Championship	Tournament Not Held						DNQ	DNQ	DNQ
World Championship	LQ	2R	LQ	LQ	LQ	LQ	A	LQ	A
Former ranking tournaments
Wuxi Classic	NR	LQ	2R	WD	Tournament Not Held				
Australian Goldfields Open	LQ	LQ	1R	WD	A	Tournament Not Held			
Shanghai Masters	LQ	LQ	LQ	LQ	LQ	LQ	NR	NH	NR
Riga Masters (Note: The event was called the Riga Open (2014/2015–2015/2016))	Not Held			MR		1R	LQ	Not Held	
Paul Hunter Classic	Minor-Ranking Event					2R	WD	Not Held	
Indian Open	Not Held		2R	2R	NH	1R	LQ	Not Held	
China Open	A	1R	2R	3R	1R	LQ	A	Not Held	
WST Classic	Tournament Not Held							1R	NH
Former non-ranking tournaments
Shoot Out	A	A	1R	1R	1R	Ranking Event			
Six-red World Championship	NH	2R	2R	3R	A	A	A	2R	NH

Performance Table Legend
LQ	lost in the qualifying draw	#R	lost in the early rounds of the tournament (WR = Wildcard round, RR = Round robin)	QF	lost in the quarter-finals
SF	lost in the semi-finals	F	lost in the final	W	won the tournament
DNQ	did not qualify for the tournament	A	did not participate in the tournament	WD	withdrew from the tournament

NH / Not Held	means an event was not held.
NR / Non-Ranking Event	means an event is/was no longer a ranking event.
R / Ranking Event	means an event is/was a ranking event.
MR / Minor-Ranking Event	means an event is/was a minor-ranking event.

== Career finals ==
=== Amateur finals: 1 (1 title) ===
Outcome	No.	Year	Championship	Opponent in the final	Score
Winner	1.	2010	World Amateur Championship	(India) Pankaj Advani	10–7
