= Aditya Mehta =

Indian snooker player (born 1985)

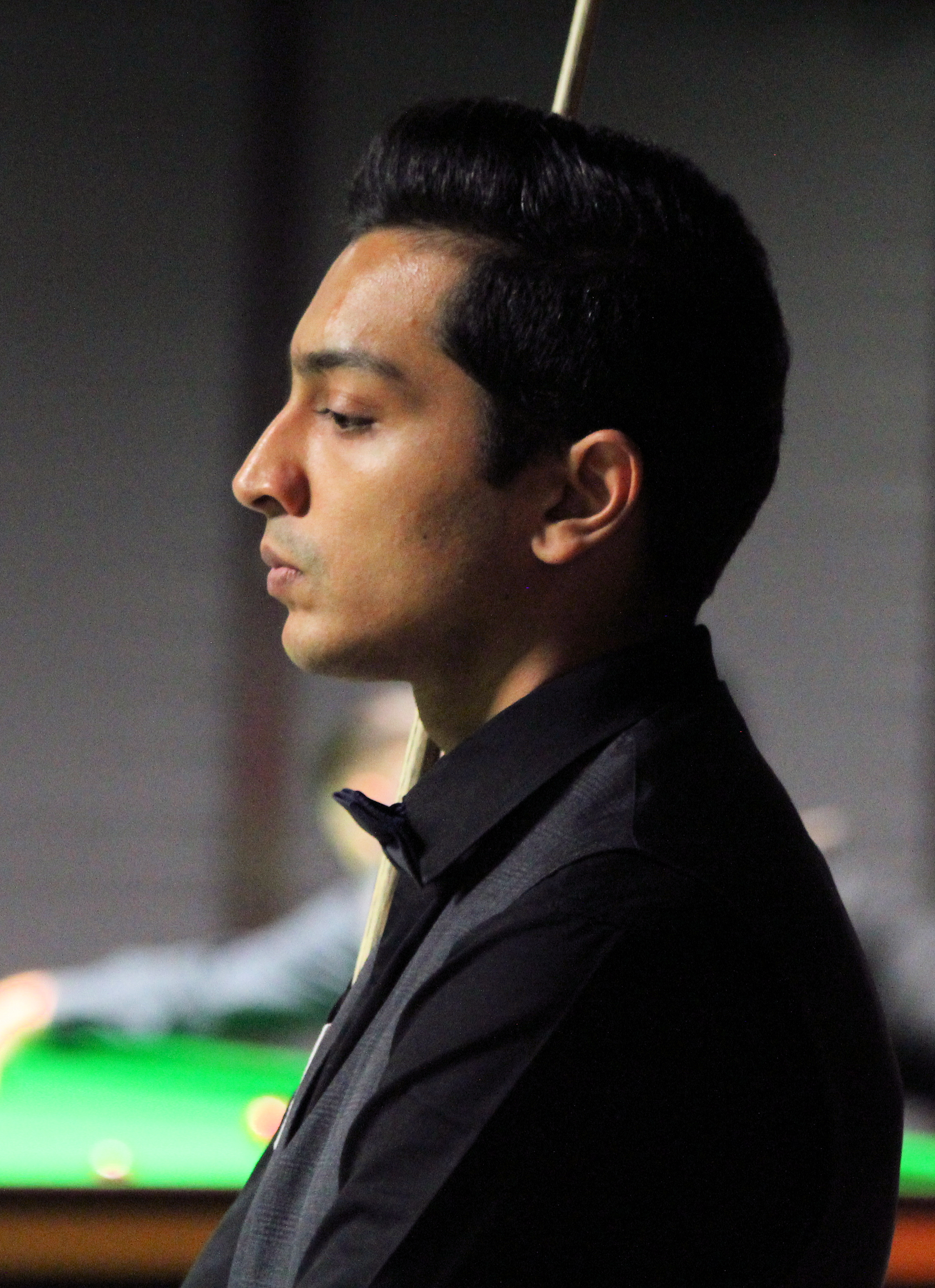
- Mehta at the 2017 Paul Hunter Classic

Personal information
- Nickname: The Star of India
- Born: 31 October 1985 (age 41) Mumbai, India

Sport
- Country: India
- Sport: Snooker
- Professional: 2008/2009, 2011–2018
- Highest ranking: 49 (May–June, August–November 2014, February–March 2015)
- Maximum breaks: 1
- Best ranking finish: Runner-up (x1)
Medal record
Men's snooker
Representing India
World Games
Gold medal – first place	2013 Cali	Singles
Asian Games
Bronze medal – third place	2006 Doha	Team
Bronze medal – third place	2010 Guangzhou	Singles
Silver medal – second place	2010 Guangzhou	Team
Asian Indoor Games
Gold medal – first place	2009 Ho Chi Minh City	Team
Representing Independent Olympic Athletes
Asian Indoor and Martial Arts Games
Bronze medal – third place	2013 Incheon	Singles
Silver medal – second place	2013 Incheon	Team

Aditya Mehta (born 31 October 1985) is an Indian former professional snooker player. He participated on the World Snooker Tour for the 2007–08 season, and between 2011 and 2018. He reached a highest world ranking of 49. Mehta participated in the final of a ranking event for the first time at the 2013 Indian Open where he played Ding Junhui, but lost 0–5.

Mehta has several medals at the Asian and World Games. He won the gold at the men's event at the 2013 World Games, and the team event at the 2009 Asian Games. Mehta compiled a total of 41 century breaks whilst on tour, the highest of which was at the 2014 Paul Hunter Classic where he made his first ever maximum break in competition.

== Career ==
=== Early career ===
Mehta was born on 31 October 1985 in Mumbai, Maharashtra, India and studied at Don Bosco High School, Matunga. He began his career by playing Challenge Tour from 2004. He was nominated for a Main Tour place for the 2008–09 season by the Asian Confederation of Billiard Sports after he finished as runner-up at the 2008 ACBS Asian Snooker Championship. He was the first Indian to play on the Main Tour since Yasin Merchant did in the 1990s. He was unable to retain his place on the Tour at the end of the season having not qualified for a single event but regained a place for the 2011–12 season after being awarded the Asian nominated place. Aditya won both a bronze and silver medal in singles and team events at the 2010 Asian Games held in Guangzhou, China.

=== 2011–2012 season: Asian champion ===
In the 2011–2012 season, as a new player on tour, Mehta would need to win four qualifying matches to reach the main stages of all ranking events. At the second event of the season, the Shanghai Masters, Mehta defeated Stuart Carrington 5–0, Rod Lawler and Jamie Jones both 5–4, before losing to former world number six Ryan Day 2–5. He played in 10 of the 12 Players Tour Championship events this season, with his best result coming in ninth event where he beat two-time World Snooker Championship runner-up Matthew Stevens 4–3 in the last 16, but then lost to Martin Gould 1–4 in the quarter-finals. In April, Mehta won the 2012 Asian Snooker Championship with a 7–5 victory over compatriot Pankaj Advani. He finished the snooker season ranked world number 80 and therefore out of the top 64 who retain their places for the next season. However, as he won the Asian championship he earned a spot on the tour for the following season.

=== 2012–2013 season: First ranking appearance ===
Mehta started the 2012–13 season at the Wuxi Classic. He beat Sam Baird 5–3, James Wattana and Jimmy White both 5–1, but then lost out to Jamie Cope 4–5 in the final qualifying round. He also lost in the final qualifying round for the Shanghai Masters following a 3–5 defeat to Mark King.

Mehta reached the main stage of a ranking event for the first time in his career in August, by qualifying for the International Championship. He overcame Michael Leslie and Mike Dunn, both 6–3 and then came back from 3–5 behind to beat Jimmy White 6–5. In the last qualifying round he defeated Jamie Cope 6–4 to seal his place at the event in Chengdu, China. At the event he defeated Zhu Yinghui in the wildcard round, before winning 6–4 against Stuart Bingham to reach the last 16 where he played world number two Judd Trump. In his first televised match in a ranking tournament Mehta was whitewashed 0–6 by Trump. However, his run in the tournament matched the best performance by an Indian player in a ranking event set by Yasin Merchant over two decades earlier. Mehta did not qualify for another event this season with his year ending in the second round of World Championship qualifying, following a 9–10 loss to Alan McManus. He finished the season ranked world number 73.

After the season ended, Mehta took part in the 2013 Asian Indoor and Martial Arts Games competing as an independent athlete. He reached the final of the team snooker event, alongside Kamal Chawla and Brijesh Damani, where they lost 2–3 to the Chinese team. He also won a bronze medal in the singles, reaching the semifinals before losing 2–4 to Ding Junhui.

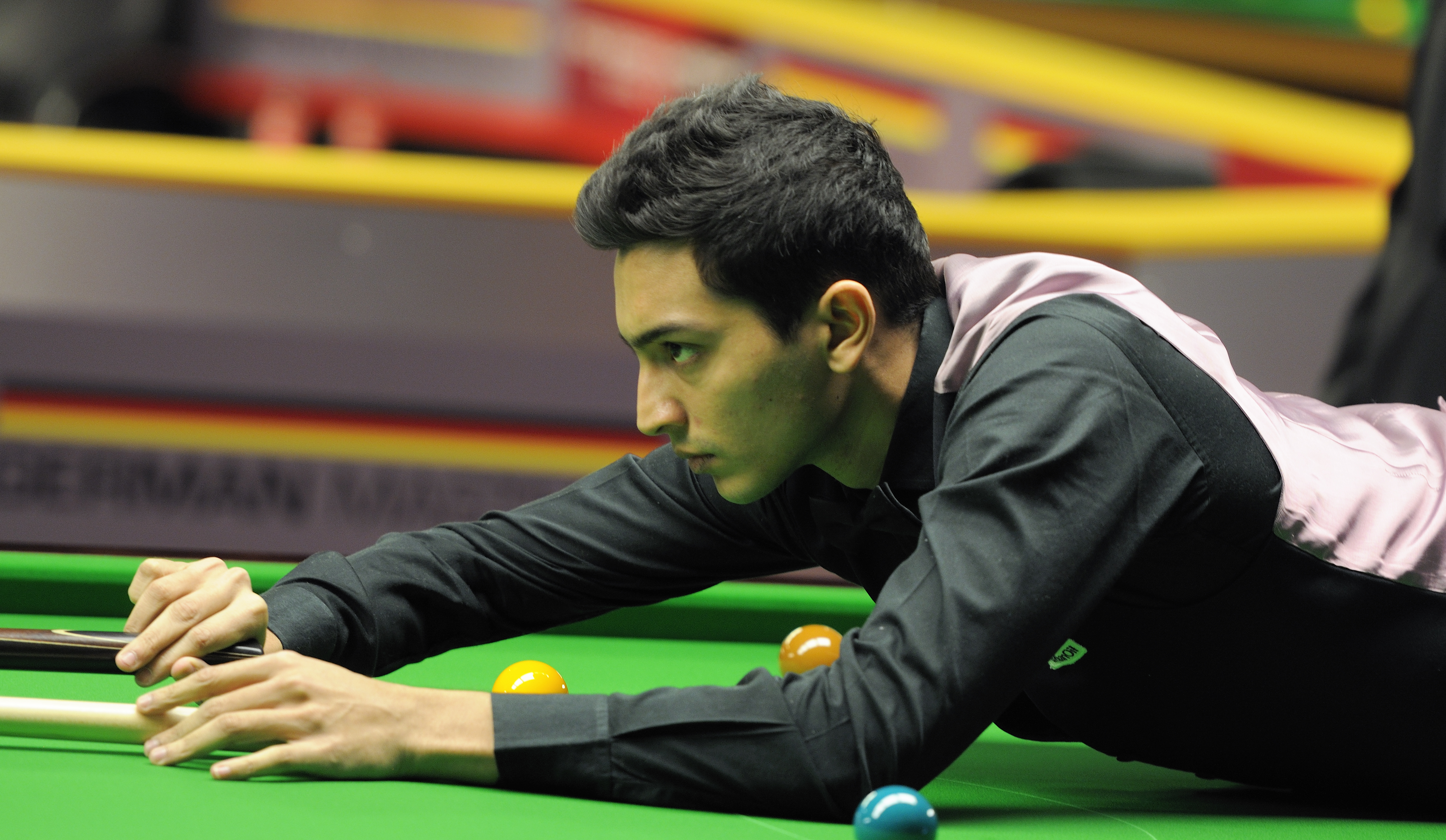
Mehta at the 2014 German Masters

=== 2013–2014 season: Ranking event finalist ===
In July 2013, Mehta won the singles event at the World Games by beating Liang Wenbo 3–0. The 2013–14 season saw the introduction of the Indian Open, the first ranking event held in India. Mehta reached the event for it by defeating Xiao Guodong 4–2 in qualifying. In the first round of the event held he made a break of 127 in the deciding frame against Peter Ebdon to win 4–3 and then beat Hammad Miah 4–1 to reach the last 16 for the second time in his career. Mehta defeated two-time world champion Mark Williams 4–2 to face compatriot Pankaj Advani. Mehta defeated Advani to reach the semi-finals. He then me Stephen Maguire who he defeated on a deciding frame 4–3 to reach the final. In his first ranking event final, Mehta played Ding Junhui, but was unable to win a frame, losing 0–5. As the tournament runner-up, Mehta won £25,000. A month later he was beaten in the quarter-finals of the minor-ranking Antwerp Open 4–0 by Jack Lisowski and finished 29th on the Order of Merit, just outside the top 25 who reached the PTC finals. Mehta's was unable to advance beyond the first round of a ranking event for the remainder of the season. He increased his ranking by 24 places during the season to end it as the world number 49, retaining his place on Tour.

=== 2014–2015 season: Maximum break ===
Mehta did not come through the qualifying rounds of the first three ranking events of the 2014–15 season, before beating James Wattana 6–3 to play in the International Championship where he was whitewashed 6–0 by Michael White in the first round. Mehta made his first maximum break in his second round loss against Stephen Maguire at the 2014 Paul Hunter Classic PTC event.

At the 2014 UK Championship he defeated Alex Davies 6–4, before losing 6–1 to Judd Trump in the second round. He reached the last 32 of a ranking event for the first time this year by defeating Sydney Wilson 4–0 and world number five Barry Hawkins 4–2 at the Welsh Open, but Alan McManus beat Mehta 0–4. At the 2015 Indian Open, Mehta held a 3–0 lead over Mark King and missed a shot on match-ball to win 4–1. Instead, King levelled at 3–3 and Mehta took the deciding frame to play world number eight Ricky Walden in the second round. Mehta was defeated 4–2 and stated that the difference between the 50 world ranking positions was "obvious in the match". His only match before the end of the season was a 10–7 loss to Jak Jones in the opening round of World Championship qualifying.

=== 2015–2016 season: Neck injury ===
Mehta qualified for the 2015 International Championship, but lost in the wildcard round 6–4 to local amateur player Wang Yuchen. Before the 2015 UK Championship he stated that a neck injury sustained in 2014 had been affecting his practice hours and confidence in his game. Mehta defeated Sam Baird 6–5 at the UK Championship, before losing 6–2 to Neil Robertson in the second round. In February 2016, in order to recover from his neck injury he pulled out of the remaining events for the season. At the end of the season, he gained a two-year pass to retain his place on tour after finishing 53rd on the European Order of Merit.

=== 2016–2017 season ===
Mehta qualified again for the 2016 International Championship by beating Jack Lisowski 6–4 and then eliminated Ryan Day 6–2. At the event he lost 6–3 to Joe Perry. He was defeated 4–3 after having been 3–0 ahead of Anthony McGill in the second round of the Northern Ireland Open. He also got to the second round of the Scottish Open before losing 4–2 to Noppon Saengkham. Mehta won 5–2 over Barry Hawkins in qualifying for the China Open and he won three frames to tie his first round match with Li Hang at 4–4, but lost the deciding frame. Mehta finished the season ranked 80th in the world.

=== 2017–18 season: Return to amateur status ===
At the 2017 China Championship, Mehta lost in the opening round to Ali Carter 5–4. At the third ranking event of the season, the Riga Masters, Mehta defeated Rory McLeod 4–2, before losing to Jamie Cope by the same scoreline in the second round. The English Open was Mehta's best performance since the 2015 Indian Open. Mehta defeated Sam Craigie 4–0, Ian Preece 4–2 and Chen Zifan 4–1 to reach the last 16 of a ranking event for the third time. Mehta played Neil Robertson, who he lost 4–1 to.

At the 2017 UK Championship, Mehta defeated Sam Baird in the opening round on a deciding frame 6–5, but lost in the second round to Luca Brecel 6–3. Mehta reached the second round of the Welsh Open defeating Martin O'Donnell, before losing to Mark Williams. Mehta's final ranking appearance of the season was at the Gibraltar Open, where he reached the third round. He defeated Brian Ochoiski and Kurt Dunham before losing to Tian Pengfei. His final match of the season was in the first round of qualifying for the 2018 World Snooker Championship, where he lost 8–10 to Zhao Xintong. Mehta finished the season outside of the top-64 in the world rankings, and did not retain his place on the World Snooker Tour. After returning to being an amateur player, Mehta played less due to his neck issues. However, in 2019 alongside Pankaj Advani the pair won the IBSF World Team Snooker Championship, defeating the Thai team 3–1.

== Personal life ==
He is a brand ambassador of snooker website rkgsnooker.com where he writes regular blog posts and columns. He practises with Alfie Burden and Anthony Hamilton in London. He is sometimes referred to as "The Sun of Indian Snooker".

== Performance and rankings timeline ==
Tournament	2004/ 05	2008/ 09	2009/ 10	2010/ 11	2011/ 12	2012/ 13	2013/ 14	2014/ 15	2015/ 16	2016/ 17	2017/ 18
Ranking (Note: From the 2010–11 season it shows the ranking at the beginning of the season.)	(Note: He was not on the Main Tour.)	(Note: New players do not have a ranking.)	(Note: He was an amateur.)			(Note: Players qualified through Indian nomination started the season without ranking points.)	73	49	54	(Note: Players qualified through European Tour Order of Merit started the season without prize money ranking points.)	78
Ranking tournaments
Riga Masters (Note: The event was called the Riga Open (2014–15 to 2015–16))	Tournament Not Held							Minor-Rank.		A	LQ
China Championship	Tournament Not Held									NR	1R
Paul Hunter Classic (Note: The event was called the Grand Prix Fürth (2004–05))	Pro-am Event			Minor-Ranking Event						A	2R
Indian Open	Not Held						F	2R	NH	LQ	LQ
World Open (Note: The event was called the Grand Prix (2004–05 to 2009–10), the World Open (2010–11) and the Haikou World Open (2011–12 to 2013–14))	A	LQ	A	A	LQ	LQ	1R	Not Held		A	LQ
European Masters	Tournament Not Held									LQ	2R
English Open	Tournament Not Held									1R	4R
International Championship	Not Held					2R	1R	1R	WR	2R	LQ
Shanghai Masters	NH	LQ	WR	A	LQ	LQ	LQ	LQ	LQ	LQ	LQ
Northern Ireland Open	Tournament Not Held									2R	1R
UK Championship	A	LQ	A	A	LQ	LQ	1R	2R	2R	1R	2R
Scottish Open	Tournament Not Held					MR	Not Held			2R	1R
German Masters	Not Held			A	LQ	LQ	1R	LQ	LQ	LQ	LQ
Shoot-Out	Not Held			Non-Ranking Event						1R	A
World Grand Prix	Tournament Not Held							NR	DNQ	DNQ	DNQ
Welsh Open	A	LQ	A	A	LQ	LQ	1R	3R	A	1R	2R
Gibraltar Open	Tournament Not Held								MR	1R	3R
Players Championship (Note: The event was called the Players Tour Championship Grand Finals (2010–11 to 2012–13))	Not Held			DNQ	DNQ	DNQ	DNQ	DNQ	DNQ	DNQ	DNQ
China Open	A	LQ	A	A	LQ	LQ	1R	LQ	A	1R	LQ
World Championship	LQ	LQ	A	A	LQ	LQ	LQ	LQ	A	LQ	LQ
Former ranking tournaments
Northern Ireland Trophy	NH	LQ	Tournament Not Held								
Bahrain Championship	NH	LQ	Tournament Not Held								
Wuxi Classic (Note: The event was called the Jiangsu Classic (2008–09 to 2009–10))	NH	Non-Ranking				LQ	LQ	LQ	Not Held		
Australian Goldfields Open	Not Held				LQ	LQ	LQ	LQ	LQ	Not Held	
Former non-ranking tournaments
General Cup (Note: The event was called the General Cup International (2004/2005–2011/2012))	RR	NH	A	NH	A	A	A	A	A	Not Held	
Six-red World Championship (Note: The event was called the Six-red Snooker International (2008–09) and the Six-red World Grand Prix (2009–10))	NH	3R	2R	A	NH	3R	A	A	A	A	A
Shoot-Out	Not Held			A	A	1R	1R	2R	WD	Ranking	

Performance Table Legend
LQ	lost in the qualifying draw	#R	lost in the early rounds of the tournament (WR = Wildcard round, RR = Round robin)	QF	lost in the quarter-finals
SF	lost in the semi-finals	F	lost in the final	W	won the tournament
DNQ	did not qualify for the tournament	A	did not participate in the tournament	WD	withdrew from the tournament

NH / Not Held	means an event was not held.
NR / Non-Ranking Event	means an event is/was no longer a ranking event.
R / Ranking Event	means an event is/was a ranking event.
MR / Minor-Ranking Event	means an event is/was a minor-ranking event.

== Career finals ==
=== Ranking finals: 1 ===
Outcome	No.	Year	Championship	Opponent in the final	Score
Runner-up	1.	2013	Indian Open	(China) Ding Junhui	0–5

=== Non-ranking finals: 1 (1 title) ===
Outcome	No.	Year	Championship	Opponent in the final	Score
Winner	1.	2013	World Games	(China) Liang Wenbo	3–0

=== Pro-am finals: 1 (1 title) ===
Outcome	No.	Year	Championship	Opponent in the final	Score
Winner	1.	2019	CCI Open	(India) Pankaj Advani	7–3

=== Amateur finals: 3 (1 title) ===
Outcome	No.	Year	Championship	Opponent in the final	Score
Runner-up	1.	2008	ACBS Asian Snooker Championship	(China) Jin Long	3–7
Runner-up	2.	2011	ACBS Asian Snooker Championship (2)	(Thailand) Passakorn Suwannawat	2–6
Winner	1.	2012	ACBS Asian Snooker Championship	(India) Pankaj Advani	7–5
