= Players Tour Championship 2011/2012 =

Series of snooker tournaments

The Players Tour Championship 2011/2012 was a series of snooker tournaments which started on 18 June 2011 and ended on 18 March 2012 with events held in England and Europe. European events were no longer called Euro Players Tour Championship (EPTC) and were included alongside other PTC events. The twelve regular events were minor-ranking events, which were concluded with the Finals.

== Schedule ==
Date (Note: Dates use the month day format)			Tournament Name	Venue	City	Winner	Runner–up	Score	References
06–18	06–22	ENG	Players Tour Championship – Event 1	World Snooker Academy	Sheffield	(England) Ronnie O'Sullivan	(England) Joe Perry	4–0	
08–06	08–10	ENG	Players Tour Championship – Event 2	South West Snooker Academy	Gloucester	(England) Judd Trump	(China) Ding Junhui	4–0	
08–17	08–21	ENG	Players Tour Championship – Event 3	World Snooker Academy	Sheffield	(England) Ben Woollaston	(Scotland) Graeme Dott	4–2	
08–25	08–28	GER	Players Tour Championship – Event 4 (Note: Event also known as the 2011 Paul Hunter Classic.)	Stadthalle	Fürth	(England) Mark Selby	(England) Mark Davis	4–0	
09–21	09–25	ENG	Players Tour Championship – Event 5	World Snooker Academy	Sheffield	(England) Andrew Higginson	(Scotland) John Higgins	4–1	
09–29	10–02	POL	Players Tour Championship – Event 6 (Note: Event also known as the 2011 Warsaw Classic.)	Arena Ursynów	Warsaw	(Australia) Neil Robertson	(England) Ricky Walden	4–1	
10–05	10–09	ENG	Players Tour Championship – Event 7 (Note: Event also known as the 2011 Kay Suzanne Memorial Trophy.)	South West Snooker Academy	Gloucester	(England) Ronnie O'Sullivan	(Wales) Matthew Stevens	4–2	
10–20	10–23	IRL	Players Tour Championship – Event 8 (Note: Event also known as the 2011 Alex Higgins International Trophy.)	Killarney Convention Centre	Killarney	(Australia) Neil Robertson	(England) Judd Trump	4–1	
11–10	11–13	BEL	Players Tour Championship – Event 9 (Note: Event also known as the 2011 Antwerp Open.)	Lotto Arena	Antwerp	(England) Judd Trump	(England) Ronnie O'Sullivan	4–3	
11–27	11–30	ENG	Players Tour Championship – Event 10	World Snooker Academy	Sheffield	(England) Michael Holt	(Wales) Dominic Dale	4–2	
12–17	12–19	ENG	Players Tour Championship – Event 11	English Institute of Sport	Sheffield	(England) Tom Ford	(England) Martin Gould	4–3	
12–15	12–16	ENG	Players Tour Championship – Event 12 (Note: Event also known as the 2012 FFB Snooker Open and the 2012 Arcaden Shopping Open.)	World Snooker Academy	Sheffield	(Scotland) Stephen Maguire	(England) Joe Perry	4–2	
01–06	01–08	GER	Players Tour Championship – Event 12	Event Forum	Fürstenfeldbruck	(Scotland) Stephen Maguire	(England) Joe Perry	4–2	
03–14	03–18	IRL	Players Tour Championship – Finals (Note: Event also known as the 2012 Players Tour Championship Grand Finals.)	Bailey Allen Hall	Galway	(England) Stephen Lee	(Australia) Neil Robertson	4–0	

== Order of Merit ==
Rank	Player	Total Points	Events Played		
Rank	Player	Total Points	UK	Europe	Total
1.	(England) Judd Trump	30,400	6	5	11
2.	(England) Ronnie O'Sullivan	29,600	6	3	9
3.	(Australia) Neil Robertson	28,100	5	5	10
4.	(England) Michael Holt	17,500	6	6	12
5.	(England) Mark Selby	17,100	6	4	10
6.	(Scotland) Graeme Dott	16,700	6	5	11
7.	(England) Andrew Higginson	16,700	6	6	12
8.	(Scotland) Stephen Maguire	16,200	6	5	11
9.	(England) Ben Woollaston	15,500	6	6	12
10.	(England) Martin Gould	14,600	6	6	12
11.	(England) Joe Perry	14,300	6	6	12
12.	(England) Tom Ford	14,000	6	6	12
13.	(Scotland) John Higgins	13,100	6	5	11
14.	(England) Stephen Lee	11,800	6	6	12
15.	(England) Ricky Walden	11,600	6	6	12
16.	(England) Mark Davis	10,500	6	6	12
17.	(Wales) Matthew Stevens	9,600	6	6	12
18.	(China) Xiao Guodong	9,100	6	6	12
19.	(Republic of Ireland) Fergal O'Brien	8,000	6	6	12
20.	(Wales) Dominic Dale	7,600	6	6	12
21.	(England) Barry Hawkins	7,600	6	6	12
22.	(China) Ding Junhui	7,600	4	3	7
23.	(Wales) Jamie Jones	7,300	6	6	12
24.	(England) Jack Lisowski	7,100	6	6	12

== Finals ==
The Finals of the Players Tour Championship 2011/2012 took place between 14–18 March 2012 at the Bailey Allen Hall in Galway, Ireland. It was contested by the top 24 players of the Order of Merit, who had played in at least 6 events (3 in the UK and 3 in Europe).

Final: Best of 7 frames. Referee: Paul Collier. Bailey Allen Hall, Galway, Ireland, 18 March 2012.
Stephen Lee (14); England	4–0	Neil Robertson (3); Australia
65–48, 62–23 (52), 63–25, 73–66 (Lee 66)
66	Highest break	35
0	Century breaks	0
2	50+ breaks	0
