= Passakorn Suwannawat =

Thai snooker player (born 1986)

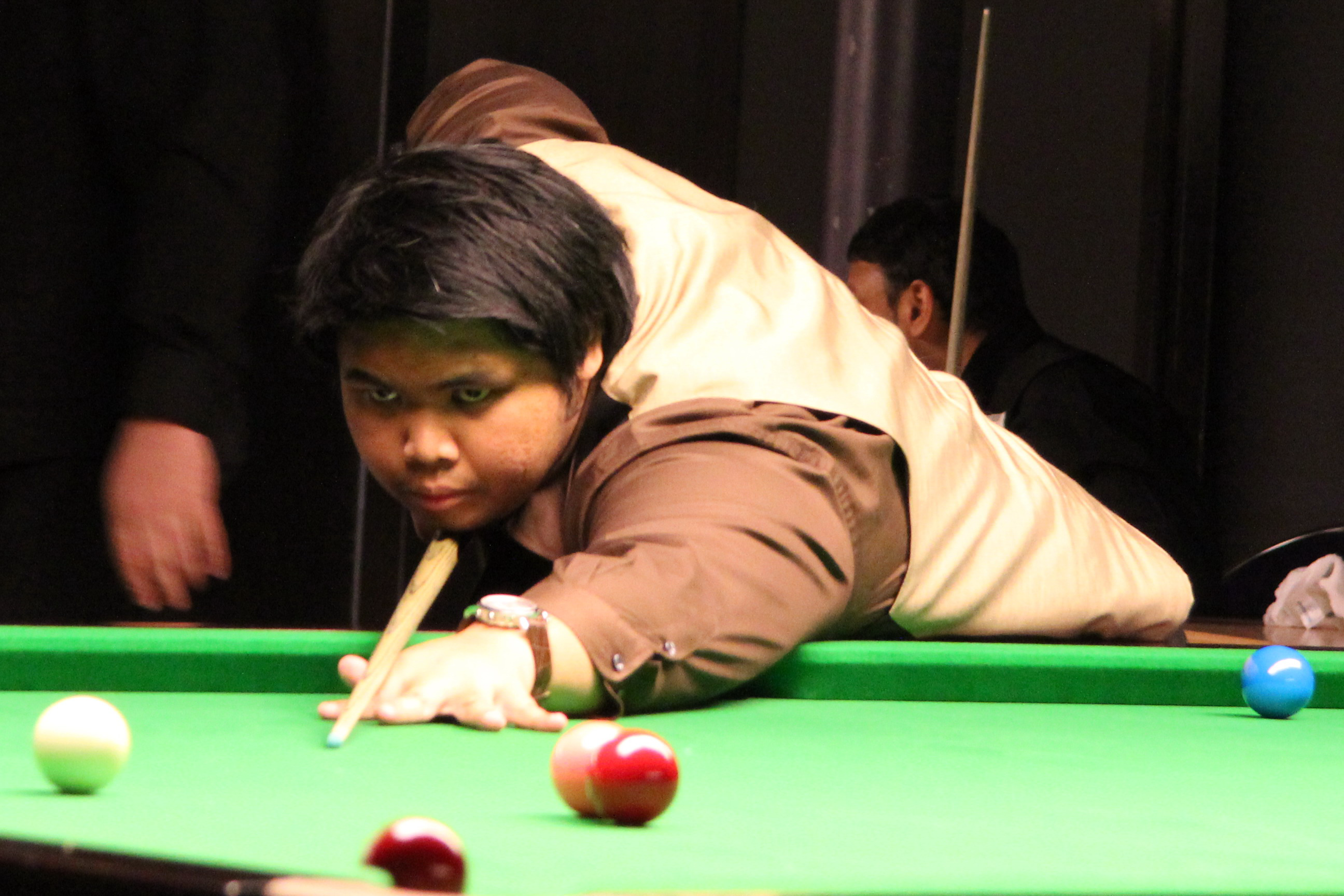
- Paul Hunter Classic 2011

Personal information
- Born: 1 May 1986 (age 40) Nakhon Pathom, Thailand

Sport
- Country: Thailand
- Sport: Snooker
- Professional: 2006–2007, 2011–2014
- Highest ranking: 68 (December 2011)
Medal record
Men's Snooker
Southeast Asian Games
Bronze medal – third place	2021 Hanoi	Individual

Passakorn Suwannawat (Thai: ภาสกร สุวรรณวัฒน์, RTGS: Phatsakon Suwannawat; born 1 May 1986, Nakhon Pathom, Thailand) is a former Thai professional snooker player.

== Career ==
=== Early career ===
Suwannawat first turned professional in the 2006–07 season by winning the 2006 ACBS Asian Under-21 Snooker Championship. He dropped off the main tour after just one season.

Suwannawat reached the final of the 2007 IBSF World Snooker Championship, losing to compatriot Atthasit Mahitthi.

=== 2011/2012 ===
He returned to the main tour in the 2011–12 season after winning the 2011 ACBS Asian Snooker Championship. Due to being a new player on the tour and therefore unranked he would need to win four qualifying matches to reach the ranking event main draws. He came closest to doing this in the Shanghai Masters where he defeated Adam Duffy, Jimmy Robertson and six-time world champion Steve Davis, before losing in the final round 1–5 to Stephen Lee.

Suwannawat played in 11 of the 12 PTC events throughout the season, with his best finish coming in Event 4 where he beat former world champions Mark Williams and Ken Doherty to reach the quarter-finals before losing to Neil Robertson. This performance largely contributed to him being placed 54 on the PTC Order of Merit, outside of the top 24 who qualified for the Finals. However, his results were good enough to earn him a place on the main tour for the 2012–13 season. Suwannawat finished the season ranked number 74 in the world.

=== 2012/2013 ===
Suwannawat began the season in the Wuxi Classic Qualifiers. He defeated Michael Wasley and Ben Woollaston, but then lost to Joe Perry in the final qualifying round. After this Suwannawat lost 17 matches in a row and had to wait until February in qualifying for the Welsh Open where he beat Jamie Jones 4–1, before losing to Marco Fu by the same scoreline. Suwannawat's season ended when he was beaten 6–10 by Zhang Anda in the first round of World Championship Qualifying. He dropped 18 places during the campaign to finish it ranked world number 92.

=== 2013/2014 ===
Suwannawat did not enter qualifying for the first two ranking events of the season and after he lost 5–4 in the Shanghai Masters qualifiers to Mohamed Khairy, it was announced by World Snooker that the match was being investigated due to unusual betting patterns. In January 2014, World Snooker stated that its investigation had been completed and the player had no case to answer. Suwannawat only participated in three more events after this, losing his first round match in all of them to be relegated from the tour.

== Performance and rankings timeline ==
Tournament	2006/ 07	2010/ 11	2011/ 12	2012/ 13	2013/ 14	2017/ 18
Ranking (Note: From the 2010/2011 season it shows the ranking at the beginning of the season.)	(Note: New players on the Main Tour don't have a ranking.)	(Note: He was an amateur.)		(Note: Players qualified through Players Tour Championship Order of Merit started the season without ranking points.)	92	
Ranking tournaments
Indian Open	Not Held				LQ	A
World Open (Note: The event was called the Grand Prix (2006/2007))	LQ	A	LQ	LQ	A	A
International Championship	Not Held			LQ	A	A
UK Championship	LQ	A	LQ	LQ	A	A
German Masters	NH	A	LQ	LQ	A	A
Welsh Open	LQ	A	LQ	LQ	A	A
Players Championship (Note: The event was called the Players Tour Championship Grand Finals (2010/2011–2015/2016))	NH	DNQ	DNQ	DNQ	DNQ	DNQ
China Open	LQ	A	LQ	LQ	A	A
World Championship	LQ	A	LQ	LQ	A	A
Non-ranking tournaments
Six-red World Championship	NH	3R	NH	RR	RR	RR
The Masters	LQ	A	A	A	A	A
Former ranking tournaments
Wuxi Classic	NH	Non-Ranking		LQ	A	NH
Australian Goldfields Open	Not Held		LQ	LQ	A	NH
Shanghai Masters	NH	WR	LQ	LQ	LQ	NH

Performance Table Legend
LQ	lost in the qualifying draw	#R	lost in the early rounds of the tournament (WR = Wildcard round, RR = Round robin)	QF	lost in the quarter-finals
SF	lost in the semi-finals	F	lost in the final	W	won the tournament
DNQ	did not qualify for the tournament	A	did not participate in the tournament	WD	withdrew from the tournament

NH / Not Held	means an event was not held.
NR / Non-Ranking Event	means an event is/was no longer a ranking event.
R / Ranking Event	means an event is/was a ranking event.
MR / Minor-Ranking Event	means an event is/was a minor-ranking event.

== Career finals ==
=== Amateur finals: 3 (2 titles) ===
Outcome	No.	Year	Championship	Opponent in the final	Score
Winner	1.	2006	Asian Under-21 Championship	(Thailand) Kobkit Palajin	6–4
Runner-up	1.	2007	World Amateur Championship	(Thailand) Atthasit Mahitthi	7–11
Winner	2.	2011	Asian Snooker Championship	(India) Aditya Mehta	6–2
