= Mario Geudens =

Belgian snooker player (born 1975)

Personal information
- Born: 13 May 1975 (age 51) Antwerp, Belgium

Sport
- Country: Belgium
- Sport: Snooker
- Professional: 1993–1997, 1998–2000
- Highest ranking: 98 (1998–99)

Mario Geudens (born 13 May 1975) is a Belgian former professional snooker player. He played on the main tour over six seasons between 1993 and 2000, being ranked inside the top 100 for the 1998/1999 season.

As an amateur, Geudens has won the Belgian Amateur Championship twice, in 1999 and 2009, and was runner-up in that event in 1992.

== Career ==
Born in 1975, Geudens turned professional in 1993, aged seventeen. He entered nine tournaments during his début season, his best performance coming in the 1994 World Championship, where he reached the fifth qualifying round; he lost there 10–4 to Chris Small.

In qualifying for the 1995 World Championship, Geudens reached the last 96 in a ranking event for the first time, beating Joe Canny and Simon Morris, both 5–2, Joe Grech 10–7, and Karl Payne 10–5, but lost at this stage 6–10 to Nick Terry.

He again reached the last 96 in the 1996 International Open, where he lost 2–5 to Mark Davis, but, after losing 7–10 to Paul Hunter in qualifying for the 1997 World Championship, Geudens finished the 1996/1997 season ranked 217th, and was relegated from the main tour.

Rejoining the tour for the 1998–99 season and beginning it ranked within the top 100 for the first time, at 98th, Geudens produced the two best performances of his career at the British Open and the World Championship. In the former, he beat John Whitty and Nick Pearce to reach the last 64, where Terry Murphy eliminated him 5–1; in the latter, he lost at the same stage 6–10 to Michael Judge.

At the 1999 Grand Prix, Geudens again recorded a last-64 finish, losing 4–5 to Anthony Hamilton, but he won only one more match throughout the 1999–2000 season and, being ranked 110th at its conclusion, was therefore relegated from the tour again.

Geudens returned to amateur snooker following the loss of his professional status; he had won the 1999 Belgian Amateur Championship by beating Bjorn Haneveer 7–5 in the final - although both were professionals at the time - and was victorious again in the 2009 edition of the event, beating Kevin Van Hove 7–3.

In 2010, he received a wildcard entry into the 2010 World Open, where he was drawn against fellow amateur Jason Devaney in the first round. Having beaten Devaney 3–2, he faced Scottish teenager Anthony McGill in the last 96; he took the first frame, but could not prevent McGill from winning 3–1.
