= Players Tour Championship 2011/2012 – Event 2 =

Players Tour Championship 2011/2012 Event 2
Tournament information
- Dates: 6–10 August 2011
- Venue: South West Snooker Academy
- City: Gloucester
- Country: England
- Organisation: World Snooker
- Format: Minor-ranking event
- Total prize fund: £50,000
- Winner's share: £10,000
- Highest break: Judd Trump (ENG) (141)

Final
- Champion: Judd Trump (ENG)
- Runner-up: Ding Junhui (CHN)
- Score: 4–0

The Players Tour Championship 2011/2012 – Event 2 was a professional minor-ranking snooker tournament that took place between 6–10 August 2011 at the South West Snooker Academy in Gloucester, England.

Judd Trump won in the final 4–0 against Ding Junhui.

== Prize fund and ranking points ==
The breakdown of prize money and ranking points of the event is shown below:

	Prize fund	Ranking points^{1}
Winner	£10,000	2,000
Runner-up	£5,000	1,600
Semi-finalist	£2,500	1,280
Quarter-finalist	£1,500	1,000
Last 16	£1,000	760
Last 32	£600	560
Last 64	£200	360
Total	£50,000	–

- ^{1} Only professional players can earn ranking points.

== Main draw ==
=== Preliminary rounds ===
==== Round 1 ====
Best of 7 frames

(England) Callum Downing	4–1	(England) Steve Ventham
(England) Ross Summers	w/o–w/d	(Canada) Brent Kolbeck
(England) Farakh Ajaib	3–4	(England) Michael Wild
(England) Nick Pearce	w/d–w/o	(England) John Woods
(England) Craig Steadman	4–0	(England) Ian Stark
(Wales) Andrew Rogers	4–0	(England) Ricky Hong Chin
(England) Reanne Evans	4–1	(Republic of Ireland) Michael Judge
(England) Andy Lee	w/d–w/o	(England) Matthew Day
(England) Jake Nicholson	4–1	(England) Jack Bradford
(England) Rock Hui	0–4	(Wales) Jak Jones
(England) Jim Buck	2–4	(Scotland) Marc Davis
(England) Ben Harrison	4–0	(England) James Cahill
(England) Saqib Nasir	4–0	(England) James Hill
(England) Sydney Wilson	4–1	(England) David Bailey
(England) Mitchell Mann	3–4	(England) Zak Surety
(England) Oliver Brown	w/o–w/d	(England) James Silverwood
(Wales) Duane Jones	4–2	(England) Steve Judd
(England) Lee Farebrother	4–1	(England) Darren Bond
(England) George Marter	4–3	(China) Zhang Anda
(England) James McGouran	4–2	(Belgium) Hans Blanckaert
(England) Phil O'Kane	2–4	(Republic of Ireland) Douglas Hogan
(England) Bash Maqsood	0–4	(England) David Gray
(England) James Welsh	3–4	(England) Stephen Craigie
(England) Joel Walker	4–3	(Wales) Stephen Ellise
(Scotland) Jonathan Fulcher	0–4	(England) Kyren Wilson
(Poland) Adam Stefanow	4–0	(Wales) Daniel Woodward

(England) Chris Norbury	4–2	(England) Liam Monk
(England) Damian Wilks	0–4	(England) Ian Glover
(England) Ryan Causton	0–4	(England) Gary Wilson
(England) Les Dodd	0–4	(Northern Ireland) Patrick Wallace
(England) Lewis Mayes	1–4	(England) Shane Castle
(England) Sean O'Sullivan	1–4	(Pakistan) Shahram Changezi
(England) Jamie O'Neill	4–3	(England) Danny Brindle
(England) Rogelio Esteiro	w/d–w/o	(England) Brian Cox
(Poland) Grzegorz Biernadski	1–4	(China) Chen Zhe
(England) Brian Robertson	2–4	(England) John Whitty
(England) Robert Tickner	0–4	(Wales) Callum Lloyd
(Germany) Lasse Münstermann	w/d–w/o	(England) Robbie Williams
(England) Antony Parsons	4–0	(England) James Frith
(England) Jack Culligan	1–4	(England) Justin Astley
(Republic of Ireland) Joe Delaney	4–0	(England) Sachin Plaha
(England) Allan Taylor	4–1	(England) Del Smith
(England) Hammad Miah	2–4	(Wales) Gareth Allen
(England) Jamie Curtis-Barrett	w/o–w/d	(England) Charlie Walters
(England) Gareth Green	4–2	(England) Brian Morgan
(England) Tony Knowles	2–4	(England) Nick Jennings
(England) Ashley Wright	4–1	(England) Andrew Milliard
(England) Sam Harvey	4–2	(England) Ricky Norris
(Wales) Kishan Hirani	1–4	(England) Billy Joe Castle
(England) Sanderson Lam	1–4	(England) Lee Page
(England) Jamie Walker	2–4	(Wales) Alex Taubman

==== Round 2 ====
Best of 7 frames

(England) Lewis Frampton	1–4	(England) Callum Downing
(England) Ross Summers	2–4	(England) Michael Wild
(England) John Woods	0–4	(England) Craig Steadman
(Wales) Andrew Rogers	1–4	(England) Reanne Evans
(Scotland) Sean James Riach	w/d–w/o	(England) Matthew Day
(England) Jake Nicholson	1–4	(Wales) Jak Jones
(Scotland) Marc Davis	0–4	(England) Ben Harrison
(England) Mitchell Travis	3–4	(England) Saqib Nasir
(England) David Birley	4–2	(England) Sydney Wilson
(England) Zak Surety	3–4	(England) Oliver Brown
(Wales) Duane Jones	4–0	(England) Lee Farebrother
(England) George Marter	1–4	(England) James McGouran
(England) Declan Bristow	1–4	(Republic of Ireland) Douglas Hogan
(England) David Gray	1–4	(England) Stephen Craigie
(England) Oliver Lines	2–4	(England) Joel Walker
(England) Kyren Wilson	4–1	(Poland) Adam Stefanow

(England) Martin Ball	2–4	(England) Chris Norbury
(England) Ian Glover	0–4	(England) Gary Wilson
(Northern Ireland) Patrick Wallace	4–0	(England) Shane Castle
(Pakistan) Shahram Changezi	1–4	(England) Jamie O'Neill
(England) Brian Cox	0–4	(China) Chen Zhe
(England) John Whitty	4–1	(Wales) Callum Lloyd
(England) Garoid O'Connor	2–4	(England) Robbie Williams
(England) Antony Parsons	0–4	(England) Justin Astley
(Republic of Ireland) Leo Fernandez	w/d–w/o	(Republic of Ireland) Joe Delaney
(England) Martin O'Donnell	2–4	(England) Allan Taylor
(Wales) Gareth Allen	2–4	(England) Jamie Curtis-Barrett
(England) Gareth Green	1–4	(England) Nick Jennings
(England) Ian Burns	2–4	(England) Ashley Wright
(England) Sam Harvey	1–4	(England) Billy Joe Castle
(England) Michael Wasley	4–1	(England) Lee Page
(England) Jordan Rimmer	3–4	(Wales) Alex Taubman

=== Main rounds ===
==== Top half ====
===== Section 1 =====
Last 128; Best of 7 frames
(Wales) Mark Williams	4
(England) Callum Downing	0
(Republic of Ireland) Ken Doherty	4
(Northern Ireland) Joe Meara	0
(England) Andy Hicks	4
(Wales) Michael White	1
(Scotland) Jamie Burnett	4
(England) Michael Wild	3
(England) Jimmy White	2
(England) Craig Steadman	4
(England) Ricky Walden	4
(China) Tian Pengfei	1
(China) Xiao Guodong	4
(England) Reanne Evans	1
(England) Rod Lawler	4
(Poland) Kacper Filipiak	1

Last 64; Best of 7 frames
(Wales) Mark Williams	3
(Republic of Ireland) Ken Doherty	4
(England) Andy Hicks	3
(Scotland) Jamie Burnett	4
(England) Craig Steadman	4
(England) Ricky Walden	3
(China) Xiao Guodong	4
(England) Rod Lawler	0

Last 32; Best of 7 frames
(Republic of Ireland) Ken Doherty	2
(Scotland) Jamie Burnett	4
(England) Craig Steadman	2
(China) Xiao Guodong	4

Last 16; Best of 7 frames
(Scotland) Jamie Burnett	1
(China) Xiao Guodong	4

===== Section 2 =====
Last 128; Best of 7 frames
(England) Jamie Cope	1
(Belgium) Luca Brecel	4
(Northern Ireland) Joe Swail	1
(England) Andrew Norman	4
(England) Martin Gould	3
(England) Ben Woollaston	4
(England) Rory McLeod	4
(England) Matthew Day	0
(England) Barry Hawkins	0
(England) Sam Craigie	4
(England) Barry Pinches	1
(Republic of Ireland) David Hogan	4
(Scotland) Alan McManus	1
(Thailand) James Wattana	4
(England) Anthony Hamilton	3
(Wales) Jak Jones	4

Last 64; Best of 7 frames
(Belgium) Luca Brecel	4
(England) Andrew Norman	0
(England) Ben Woollaston	1
(England) Rory McLeod	4
(England) Sam Craigie	4
(Republic of Ireland) David Hogan	2
(Thailand) James Wattana	2
(Wales) Jak Jones	4

Last 32; Best of 7 frames
(Belgium) Luca Brecel	3
(England) Rory McLeod	4
(England) Sam Craigie	1
(Wales) Jak Jones	4

Last 16; Best of 7 frames
(England) Rory McLeod	4
(Wales) Jak Jones	3

===== Section 3 =====
Last 128; Best of 7 frames
(England) Dave Harold	4
(England) Ben Harrison	0
(England) Nigel Bond	4
(England) Saqib Nasir	1
(Northern Ireland) Gerard Greene	4
(England) David Birley	0
(England) Steve Davis	4
(Scotland) Scott Mackenzie	1
(Wales) Ryan Day	4
(England) Oliver Brown	0
(England) Mike Dunn	4
(England) David Gilbert	3
(England) Mark King	w/d
(England) Simon Bedford	w/o
(England) Michael Holt	1
(China) Li Yan	4

Last 64; Best of 7 frames
(England) Dave Harold	4
(England) Nigel Bond	2
(Northern Ireland) Gerard Greene	1
(England) Steve Davis	4
(Wales) Ryan Day	4
(England) Mike Dunn	1
(England) Simon Bedford	4
(China) Li Yan	0

Last 32; Best of 7 frames
(England) Dave Harold	4
(England) Steve Davis	0
(Wales) Ryan Day	4
(England) Simon Bedford	1

Last 16; Best of 7 frames
(England) Dave Harold	2
(Wales) Ryan Day	4

===== Section 4 =====
Last 128; Best of 7 frames
(China) Liu Chuang	2
(Wales) Duane Jones	4
(Scotland) Graeme Dott	4
(Norway) Kurt Maflin	2
(England) Robert Milkins	4
(England) James McGouran	1
(England) Tom Ford	4
(Republic of Ireland) Douglas Hogan	1
(Scotland) Marcus Campbell	4
(England) Stephen Craigie	1
(England) Stephen Lee	4
(England) Joel Walker	1
(China) Ding Junhui	4
(Wales) Daniel Wells	1
(England) Peter Ebdon	2
(England) Kyren Wilson	4

Last 64; Best of 7 frames
(Wales) Duane Jones	0
(Scotland) Graeme Dott	4
(England) Robert Milkins	2
(England) Tom Ford	4
(Scotland) Marcus Campbell	4
(England) Stephen Lee	2
(China) Ding Junhui	4
(England) Kyren Wilson	2

Last 32; Best of 7 frames
(Scotland) Graeme Dott	4
(England) Tom Ford	3
(Scotland) Marcus Campbell	2
(China) Ding Junhui	4

Last 16; Best of 7 frames
(Scotland) Graeme Dott	3
(China) Ding Junhui	4

==== Bottom half ====
===== Section 5 =====
Last 128; Best of 7 frames
(England) Mark Selby	4
(England) Chris Norbury	0
(England) Shaun Murphy	4
(England) Paul Davison	1
(Hong Kong) Marco Fu	2
(England) Gary Wilson	4
(England) Mark Joyce	3
(England) Adam Duffy	4
(China) Liang Wenbo	4
(China) Cao Yupeng	1
(England) Jimmy Robertson	3
(Northern Ireland) Patrick Wallace	4
(England) Joe Jogia	4
(England) Stuart Carrington	3
(England) Matthew Selt	3
(China) Yu Delu	4

Last 64; Best of 7 frames
(England) Mark Selby	4
(England) Shaun Murphy	0
(England) Gary Wilson	2
(England) Adam Duffy	4
(China) Liang Wenbo	1
(Northern Ireland) Patrick Wallace	4
(England) Joe Jogia	2
(China) Yu Delu	4

Last 32; Best of 7 frames
(England) Mark Selby	0
(England) Adam Duffy	4
(Northern Ireland) Patrick Wallace	3
(China) Yu Delu	4

Last 16; Best of 7 frames
(England) Adam Duffy	3
(China) Yu Delu	4

===== Section 6 =====
Last 128; Best of 7 frames
(Scotland) Anthony McGill	4
(England) Adam Wicheard	0
(England) Andrew Higginson	4
(England) Jamie O'Neill	1
(Australia) Neil Robertson	4
(China) Chen Zhe	0
(Wales) Dominic Dale	2
(England) John Whitty	4
(England) Mark Davis	4
(England) Robbie Williams	1
(England) Peter Lines	w/o
(Finland) Robin Hull	w/d
(England) Judd Trump	4
(England) Justin Astley	2
(Northern Ireland) Mark Allen	4
(Republic of Ireland) Joe Delaney	2

Last 64; Best of 7 frames
(Scotland) Anthony McGill	4
(England) Andrew Higginson	1
(Australia) Neil Robertson	4
(England) John Whitty	1
(England) Mark Davis	4
(England) Peter Lines	2
(England) Judd Trump	4
(Northern Ireland) Mark Allen	2

Last 32; Best of 7 frames
(Scotland) Anthony McGill	0
(Australia) Neil Robertson	4
(England) Mark Davis	2
(England) Judd Trump	4

Last 16; Best of 7 frames
(Australia) Neil Robertson	3
(England) Judd Trump	4

===== Section 7 =====
Last 128; Best of 7 frames
(Wales) Jamie Jones	1
(England) Liam Highfield	4
(England) Adrian Gunnell	4
(Wales) Andrew Pagett	1
(China) Liu Song	3
(England) Sam Baird	4
(England) Stuart Bingham	4
(England) Allan Taylor	0
(England) Jack Lisowski	1
(Republic of Ireland) David Morris	4
(Wales) Matthew Stevens	4
(England) Jamie Curtis-Barrett	3
(England) Ronnie O'Sullivan	4
(England) Nick Jennings	1
(Scotland) Stephen Hendry	4
(England) Ashley Wright	0

Last 64; Best of 7 frames
(England) Liam Highfield	4
(England) Adrian Gunnell	1
(England) Sam Baird	4
(England) Stuart Bingham	1
(Republic of Ireland) David Morris	3
(Wales) Matthew Stevens	4
(England) Ronnie O'Sullivan	4
(Scotland) Stephen Hendry	1

Last 32; Best of 7 frames
(England) Liam Highfield	4
(England) Sam Baird	2
(Wales) Matthew Stevens	3
(England) Ronnie O'Sullivan	4

Last 16; Best of 7 frames
(England) Liam Highfield	3
(England) Ronnie O'Sullivan	4

===== Section 8 =====
Last 128; Best of 7 frames
(England) Joe Perry	w/o
(Belgium) Bjorn Haneveer	w/d
(Malta) Tony Drago	4
(Thailand) Dechawat Poomjaeng	3
(England) Ian McCulloch	3
(Thailand) Passakorn Suwannawat	4
(Republic of Ireland) Fergal O'Brien	4
(England) Billy Joe Castle	0
(England) Alfie Burden	4
(England) Michael Wasley	1
(England) Ali Carter	4
(England) David Grace	2
(Scotland) Stephen Maguire	4
(Wales) Alex Taubman	1
(Scotland) John Higgins	4
(England) Matthew Couch	2

Last 64; Best of 7 frames
(England) Joe Perry	2
(Malta) Tony Drago	4
(Thailand) Passakorn Suwannawat	1
(Republic of Ireland) Fergal O'Brien	4
(England) Alfie Burden	2
(England) Ali Carter	4
(Scotland) Stephen Maguire	2
(Scotland) John Higgins	4

Last 32; Best of 7 frames
(Malta) Tony Drago	3
(Republic of Ireland) Fergal O'Brien	4
(England) Ali Carter	4
(Scotland) John Higgins	1

Last 16; Best of 7 frames
(Republic of Ireland) Fergal O'Brien	4
(England) Ali Carter	2

==== Finals ====
Quarter-finals; Best of 7 frames		Semi-finals; Best of 7 frames		Final; Best of 7 frames
(China) Xiao Guodong	4
(England) Rory McLeod	1	(China) Xiao Guodong	3
(Wales) Ryan Day	2	(China) Ding Junhui	4
(China) Ding Junhui	4			(China) Ding Junhui	0
(China) Yu Delu	1			(England) Judd Trump	4
(England) Judd Trump	4	(England) Judd Trump	4
(England) Ronnie O'Sullivan	3	(Republic of Ireland) Fergal O'Brien	0
(Republic of Ireland) Fergal O'Brien	4

== Century breaks ==
- 141, 121, 120 – Judd Trump
- 140 – James Wattana
- 140 – Barry Pinches
- 137, 135, 124 – Graeme Dott
- 137 – Dominic Dale
- 134 – Ian Burns
- 134 – Ali Carter
- 133, 106 – Adam Duffy
- 133 – Jamie O'Neill
- 129 – Ryan Day
- 128, 123 – Ding Junhui
- 125 – Matthew Stevens
- 124 – Justin Astley
- 124 – Rod Lawler
- 121, 102 – Jamie Burnett
- 118, 110 – Mark Selby
- 116 – Mike Dunn
- 113, 106 – Anthony McGill
- 112, 106 – Xiao Guodong
- 112 – David Morris
- 109, 100 – Ronnie O'Sullivan
- 107 – Liam Monk
- 107 – Neil Robertson
- 106, 100 – Kyren Wilson
- 106 – Mark Davis
- 105, 103 – Ken Doherty
- 104 – Alan McManus
- 104 – Alfie Burden
- 103 – Joe Swail
- 103 – Marco Fu
- 102 – Steve Davis
- 102 – Fergal O'Brien
- 101, 100 – Mark Allen
- 101 – Andy Hicks
- 101 – Craig Steadman
- 101 – Jimmy Robertson
- 100 – Chen Zhe
- 100 – Dave Harold
