= Steve Lemmens =

Belgian snooker player

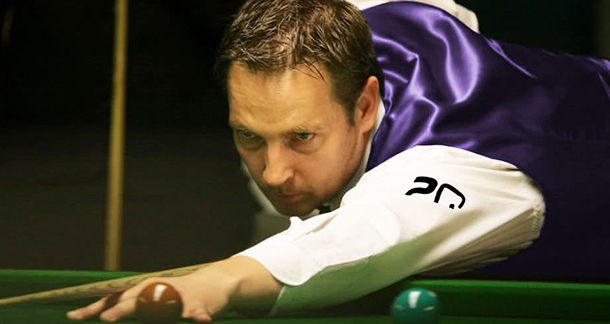

Personal information
- Born: 8 September 1972 Leuven, Flemish Brabant
- Died: 11 October 2016 (aged 44) Wezemaal, Flemish Brabant

Sport
- Country: Belgium
- Sport: Snooker
- Professional: 1991–1997
- Highest ranking: 167 (1994/1995)
- Best ranking finish: Last 32 (1993 Welsh Open)

Steve Lemmens (September 8, 1972 – October 11, 2016) was a Belgian former professional snooker player who played on the main tour between 1991 and 1995.

== Career ==
Lemmens first burst onto the snooker scene in his home country when at the age of 16 he reached the finals of the Belgian Amateur Championship, a record that would not be beaten until 2010 by Luca Brecel. Three years later in 1990 he won the Belgian Championship after defeating five-time champion Mario Lannoye 7–2 in the final, as a result Lemmens went on to represent Belgium in the 1990 World Amateur Championship where he reached the final eventually losing 11–8 to Irishman Stephen O'Connor.

Following on from this success Lemmens turned professional in 1991, in a time when the tour was a largely open affair with over 700 players allowed to compete professionally. He had several years on the tour but ultimately only managed to achieve limited success with an appearance in the last 32 of the 1993 Welsh Open being his most successful result and never having climbed higher than 167th in the world rankings. By 1997, Lemmens had fallen further in the world rankings, and dropped off of the main tour at the end of the 1996–97 snooker season.

In 1996 he once again competed in the world amateur championship reaching the semi-finals before losing to eventual winner and future world champion Stuart Bingham.

== Death ==
On 10 October 2016, at the age of 44, Lemmens died by suicide when he stood in front of a train at Wezemaal.

== Performance and rankings timeline ==
Tournaments	1990/ 91	1991/ 92	1992/ 93	1993/ 94		1994/ 95	1995/ 96	1996/ 97	2001/ 02
Rankings (Note: It shows the ranking at the beginning of the season)	(Note: He was an amateur)	(Note: New players on the Main Tour do not have a ranking)	234	171		167	216	419	
Ranking tournaments
British Open	A	LQ	LQ	LQ		LQ	A	A	WD
LG Cup (Note: The event was called the Grand Prix (1990/1991-1996/1997))	A	LQ	LQ	LQ		LQ	A	A	WD
European Open	A	LQ	LQ	LQ		LQ	A	A	WD
UK Championship	A	LQ	LQ	LQ		LQ	A	A	WD
Welsh Open	NH	LQ	2R	LQ		LQ	A	A	WD
China Open	Tournament Not Held								WD
Thailand Masters (Note: The event was called the Asian Open (1990/1991-1992/1993) and the Thailand Open (1993/1994-1996/1997))	A	LQ	LQ	LQ		LQ	A	A	WD
Scottish Open (Note: The event was called the International Open (1992/1993-1996/1997))	Not Held		LQ	LQ		LQ	A	A	WD
World Championship	A	LQ	LQ	LQ		A	A	A	WD
Non-ranking tournaments
The Masters	A	LQ	LQ	LQ		A	A	A	A
Former ranking tournaments
Classic	A	LQ	Tournament Not Held						
Strachan Open (Note: The event was called the Strachan Challenge (1992/1993-1993/1994))	NH	LQ	MR	NR		Tournament Not Held			
Asian Classic (Note: The event was called the Dubai Classic (1990/1991-1994/1995) and the Thailand Classic (1995/1996))	A	LQ	LQ	LQ		LQ	A	A	NH
Former non-ranking tournaments
World Masters	LQ	Tournament Not Held							
Belgian Challenge	NH	1R	Tournament Not Held						
Kent Cup	RR	NH	A	Tournament Not Held					
Strachan Open	NH	A	MR	LQ	LQ	Tournament Not Held			
Belgian Masters	1R	2R	1R	Not Held			A	Not Held	

Performance Table Legend
LQ	lost in the qualifying draw	#R	lost in the early rounds of the tournament (WR = Wildcard round, RR = Round robin)	QF	lost in the quarter-finals
SF	lost in the semi-finals	F	lost in the final	W	won the tournament
DNQ	did not qualify for the tournament	A	did not participate in the tournament	WD	withdrew from the tournament

NH / Not Held	means an event was not held
NR / Non-Ranking Event	means an event is/was no longer a ranking event
R / Ranking Event	means an event is/was a ranking event
MR / Minor-Ranking Event	means an event is/was a minor-ranking event

== Career finals ==
=== Amateur finals: 20 (10 titles) ===
Outcome	No.	Year	Championship	Opponent in the final	Score
Winner	1.	1987	Belgian Under-21 Championship	(Belgium) Steve Cohen	7–3
Runner-up	1.	1987	Belgian Amateur Championship	(Belgium) Mario Lannoye	0–7
Winner	2.	1988	Belgian Under-21 Championship	(Belgium) Steve Cohen	5–1
Runner-up	2.	1989	Belgian Under-21 Championship	(Belgium) Eric van der Linden	3–5
Winner	3.	1990	Belgian Under-21 Championship	(Belgium) Patrick Delsemme	5–1
Winner	4.	1990	Belgian Amateur Championship	(Belgium) Mario Lannoye	7–2
Runner-up	3.	1990	IBSF World Snooker Championship	(Republic of Ireland) Stephen O'Connor	8–11
Runner-up	4.	1991	German Open Snooker Ranking - Event 16 - 3 Stars - Münster Classic	(Netherlands) Wilfred Dijkstra	4–5
Winner	5.	1991	German Open Snooker Ranking - Event 19 - 3 Stars - Münster Open	(Belgium) Peter Bullen	5–3
Runner-up	5.	1991	German Open Snooker Ranking - Event 20 - 5 Stars - German Open	(England) Mark King	0–6
Winner	6.	1992	German Open Snooker Ranking - Event 2 - 2 Stars	(Netherlands) Rene Dikstra	3–0
Runner-up	6.	1992	German Open Snooker Ranking - Event 7 - 4 Stars - München Open	(Germany) Mike Henson	1–4
Winner	7.	1992	German Open Snooker Ranking - Event 27 - 2 Stars	(Belgium) Mario Geudens	3–1
Winner	8.	1993	German Open Snooker Ranking - Event 9 - 4 Stars - Gelsenkirchen Open	(Belgium) Peter Bullen	4–2
Runner-up	7.	1993	German Open Snooker Ranking - Event 43 - 5 Stars - German Open	(England) Stefan Mazrocis	0–4
Winner	9.	1994	Belgian Professional Championship	(Belgium) Mario Geudens	7–6
Runner-up	8.	1995	Belgian Amateur Championship	(Belgium) Patrick Delsemme	3–7
Runner-up	9.	1996	Belgian Amateur Championship	(Belgium) Bjorn Haneveer	6–7
Runner-up	10.	1997	Belgian Amateur Championship	(Belgium) Patrick Delsemme	5–7
Winner	10.	2001	Euro Tour - Event 4	(Belgium) Jim Spapen	3–0
