= 2014 EBSA European Snooker Championship =

EBSA European Snooker Championships
Tournament information
- City: Sofia
- Country: Bulgaria
- Organisation: EBSA

Final
- Champion: (England) Mitchell Mann
- Runner-up: (England) John Whitty
- Score: 7–2

The 2014 EBSA European Snooker Championships took place in Sofia, Bulgaria. It was won by eighth seed Mitchell Mann who defeated second seed John Whitty 7–2 in an all-English final. Mann had taken a 5–0 lead in the match, before Whitty won the sixth and seventh frames. For winning the tournament, Mann was rewarded with a place on the professional World Snooker Tour for the 2014–15 and 2015–16 seasons. Mann took a 5–0 lead in the final,

== Results ==
Round One
1	(Wales) Jamie Clarke	4
64	(Serbia) Sasa Stojanovic	0
33	(Belgium) Jurian Heusdens	4
32	(Austria) Paul Schopf	0
17	(Poland) Krzysztof Wróbel	4
48	(Denmark) Thomas Salling	1
49	(Czech Republic) Lukas Krenek	1
16	(Ukraine) Sergiy Isayenko	4
9	(Wales) Gareth Allen	4
56	(Iceland) Bernharð Bernharðsson	3
41	(Bulgaria) Bratislav Krastev	0
24	(Turkey) Soner Sari	4
25	(Germany) Sascha Lippe	4
40	(Israel) Maor Shalom	2
57	(Croatia) Roberto Bartol	1
8	(England) Mitchell Mann	4
5	(Wales) Alex Taubman	4
60	(Denmark) Lasse Petersen	1
37	(Wales) Duane Jones	4
28	(Wales) Ben Jones	0
21	(Germany) Roman Dietzel	4
44	(Iceland) Sigurour Kristjansson	1
53	(Finland) Jani Kananen	4
12	(Finland) Saku Veikkanen	1
13	(Republic of Ireland) Josh Boileau	4
52	(Germany) Felix Frede	1
45	(Cyprus) George Louka	1
20	(Scotland) Robert Carlisle	4
29	(Bulgaria) Georgi Velichkov	2
36	(Finland) Heikki Niva	4
61	(Czech Republic) Daniel Mily	1
4	(Austria) Andreas Ploner	4
3	(Republic of Ireland) Rodney Goggins	4
62	(Bulgaria) Cvetan Pavlov	1
35	(Northern Ireland) Raymond Fry	4
30	(Bulgaria) Nikola Kemilev	2
19	(England) Callum Downing	4
46	(Austria) Markus Pfistermüller	1
51	(Poland) Mateusz Baranowski	1
14	(Israel) Shachar Ruberg	4
11	(England) Nick Jennings	4
54	(Netherlands) Joris Maas	2
43	(Poland) Grzegorz Biernadski	4
22	(Poland) Patryk Masłowski	1
27	(Scotland) Ross Vallance	3
38	(Bulgaria) Ivailo Pekov	4
59	(Denmark) Danny Eriksen	0
6	(Scotland) Gary Thomson	4
7	(Iceland) Kristján Helgason	4
58	(Bulgaria) Spasian Spasov	1
39	(Germany) Lukas Kleckers	2
26	(Cyprus) Anthony Brabin	4
23	(Poland) Adam Stefanów	4
42	(Israel) Mor Mezrhei	3
55	(Bulgaria) Salim Otti	0
10	(Scotland) Eden Sharav	4
15	(Cyprus) Antonis Poullos	4
50	(Russia) Barseg Petrosyan	2
47	(Romania) Rares Sinca	0
18	(Republic of Ireland) Jason Devaney	4
31	(Belgium) Kevin Van Hove	4
34	(Poland) Kacper Filipiak	0
63	(Russia) Kirill Lomakin	0
2	(England) John Whitty	4

Round Two
1	(Wales) Jamie Clarke	5
33	(Belgium) Jurian Heusdens	2
17	(Poland) Krzysztof Wróbel	1
16	(Ukraine) Sergiy Isayenko	5
9	(Wales) Gareth Allen	5
24	(Turkey) Soner Sari	2
25	(Germany) Sascha Lippe	3
8	(England) Mitchell Mann	5
5	(Wales) Alex Taubman	0
37	(Wales) Duane Jones	5
21	(Germany) Roman Dietzel	5
53	(Finland) Jani Kananen	2
13	(Republic of Ireland) Josh Boileau	5
20	(Scotland) Robert Carlisle	4
36	(Finland) Heikki Niva	4
4	(Austria) Andreas Ploner	5
3	(Republic of Ireland) Rodney Goggins	5
35	(Northern Ireland) Raymond Fry	1
19	(England) Callum Downing	3
14	(Israel) Shachar Ruberg	5
11	(England) Nick Jennings	5
43	(Poland) Grzegorz Biernadski	4
38	(Bulgaria) Ivailo Pekov	5
6	(Scotland) Gary Thomson	4
7	(Iceland) Kristján Helgason	5
26	(Cyprus) Anthony Brabin	2
23	(Poland) Adam Stefanów	2
10	(Scotland) Eden Sharav	5
15	(Cyprus) Antonis Poullos	1
18	(Republic of Ireland) Jason Devaney	5
31	(Belgium) Kevin Van Hove	1
2	(England) John Whitty	5

Round Three
1	(Wales) Jamie Clarke	5
16	(Ukraine) Sergiy Isayenko	4
9	(Wales) Gareth Allen	2
8	(England) Mitchell Mann	5
37	(Wales) Duane Jones	5
21	(Germany) Roman Dietzel	2
13	(Republic of Ireland) Josh Boileau	3
4	(Austria) Andreas Ploner	5
3	(Republic of Ireland) Rodney Goggins	3
14	(Israel) Shachar Ruberg	5
11	(England) Nick Jennings	5
38	(Bulgaria) Ivailo Pekov	1
7	(Iceland) Kristján Helgason	5
10	(Scotland) Eden Sharav	2
18	(Republic of Ireland) Jason Devaney	0
2	(England) John Whitty	5

Quarter-finals
1	(Wales) Jamie Clarke	1
8	(England) Mitchell Mann	5
37	(Wales) Duane Jones	5
4	(Austria) Andreas Ploner	4
14	(Israel) Shachar Ruberg	3
11	(England) Nick Jennings	5
7	(Iceland) Kristján Helgason	0
2	(England) John Whitty	5

Semi-finals
8	(England) Mitchell Mann	6
37	(Wales) Duane Jones	4
11	(England) Nick Jennings	3
2	(England) John Whitty	6

Final
8	(England) Mitchell Mann	7
2	(England) John Whitty	2
