= John Pellew =

John Pellew may refer to:

- John Pellew (cricketer) (1882–1946), Australian cricketer
- John Pellew (snooker referee) (born 1955), Welsh snooker referee
