= 1992 Belgian Masters =

Invitational snooker tournament

Tournament information
- Dates: 28 October – 1 November 1992
- Venue: Matchroom Schijnpoort
- City: Antwerp
- Country: Belgium
- Format: Non-ranking event
- Total prize fund: £60,000
- Winner's share: £15,000
- Highest break: Stephen Hendry (SCO) (130)

Final
- Champion: James Wattana (THA)
- Runner-up: John Parrott (ENG)
- Score: 10–5

The 1992 Belgian Masters was a professional non-ranking snooker tournament that took place between 28 October and 1 November 1992 at the Matchroom Schijnpoort in Antwerp, Belgium. James Wattana won the title, defeating John Parrott 10–5 in the final, and received £15,000 prize money. Stephen Hendry compiled the highest break of the tournament, 130, during his quarter-final defeat of Gary Wilkinson.

Wattana reached the final with three deciding frame wins. He was 1–3 behind in the final, before winning four consecutive frames. Wattana later led 7–4 and 8–5, and made a century break (102) in the fifteenth frame to win the match 10–5.

== Results ==
First round

| Player | Score | Player |
|---|---|---|
| Ronnie O'Sullivan (ENG) | 4–3 | Peter Ebdon (ENG) |
| James Wattana (THA) | 4–3 | Terry Griffiths (WAL) |
| Neal Foulds (ENG) | 4–3 | Steve Davis (ENG) |
| Gary Wilkinson (ENG) | 4–3 | Steve Lemmens (BEL) |

Quarter-finals; Best-of-9 frames
(Scotland) Stephen Hendry | 5
(England) Gary Wilkinson | 3
(England) John Parrott | 5
(England) Neal Foulds | 2
(England) Jimmy White | 4
(Thailand) James Wattana | 5
(England) Mike Hallett | 3
(England) Ronnie O'Sullivan | 5

Semi-finals; Best-of-11 frames
(Scotland) Stephen Hendry | 3
(England) John Parrott | 6
(Thailand) James Wattana | 6
(England) Ronnie O'Sullivan | 5

Final; Best-of-19 frames
(England) John Parrott | 5
(Thailand) James Wattana | 10
