= 2022 Championship League (ranking) =

Snooker tournament held June and July 2022

Tournament information
- Dates: 28 June – 29 July 2022
- Venue: Morningside Arena
- City: Leicester
- Country: England
- Organisation: Matchroom Sport
- Format: Ranking event
- Total prize fund: £328,000
- Winner's share: £33,000
- Highest break: Zhao Xintong (CHN) (145)

Final
- Champion: Luca Brecel (BEL)
- Runner-up: Lu Ning (CHN)
- Score: 3–1

The 2022 Championship League was a professional ranking snooker tournament that took place from 28 June to 29 July 2022 at the Morningside Arena in Leicester, England. The event featured 128 players and was played as three rounds of round-robin groups of four, before a best-of-five final. It was the 19th edition of the Championship League and the first ranking tournament of the 2022–23 snooker season.

David Gilbert was the defending champion, having defeated Mark Allen 3–1 in the final of the previous ranking edition of the tournament. However, he was knocked out during the second group stage of this edition.

Luca Brecel won the tournament, defeating Lu Ning 3–1 to win his third ranking title and second Championship League title.

== Tournament format ==
The 2022 Championship League took place from 28 June to 29 July 2022 at the Morningside Arena in Leicester, England. 128 players took part in the event. The competition began with 32 rounds of group matches with each group consisting of four players. Two groups were played to a finish every day during four blocks, from 28 June to 1 July, from 4 to 7 July, from 11 to 14 July, and from 18 to 21 July using a two-table setup in the arena. The groups were contested using a round-robin format, with six matches played in each group. All matches in group play were played as best of four frames, with three points awarded for a win and one point for a draw. Group positions were determined by points scored, frame difference and then head-to-head results between players who were tied. Places that were still tied were then determined by the highest break made in the group.

The 32 players that topped the group tables qualified for the group winners' stage, consisting of eight groups of four players. The eight winners from the group winners' stage qualified for the two final groups, with the final taking place later on the same day. The winner took the Championship League title and a place at the 2022 Champion of Champions.

=== Prize fund ===
The breakdown of prize money for the tournament is shown below.

Stage One

- Winner: £3,000
- Runner-up: £2,000
- Third place: £1,000
- Fourth place: £0

Stage Two

- Winner: £4,000
- Runner-up: £3,000
- Third place: £2,000
- Fourth place: £1,000

Stage Three

- Winner: £6,000
- Runner-up: £4,000
- Third place: £2,000
- Fourth place: £1,000

Final

- Winner: £20,000
- Runner-up: £10,000

- Tournament total: £328,000

== Stage One ==
Stage One consisted of 32 groups, each containing four players.

=== Order of play ===
Date	Group
28 June	Group 13
28 June	Group 24
29 June	Group 4
29 June	Group 31
30 June	Group 6
30 June	Group 26
1 July	Group 10
1 July	Group 29

Date	Group
4 July	Group 1
4 July	Group 27
5 July	Group 15
5 July	Group 32
6 July	Group 9
6 July	Group 30
7 July	Group 3
7 July	Group 23

Date	Group
11 July	Group 5
11 July	Group 28
12 July	Group 21
12 July	Group 22
13 July	Group 18
13 July	Group 20
14 July	Group 17
14 July	Group 25

Date	Group
18 July	Group 11
18 July	Group 14
19 July	Group 2
19 July	Group 7
20 July	Group 16
20 July	Group 19
21 July	Group 8
21 July	Group 12

=== Group 1 ===
Group 1 was played on 4 July.

==== Matches ====
- Ronnie O'Sullivan 3–0 Farakh Ajaib
- Alexander Ursenbacher 3–1 Alfie Burden
- Alexander Ursenbacher 3–1 Farakh Ajaib
- Ronnie O'Sullivan 3–1 Alfie Burden
- Alfie Burden 2–2 Farakh Ajaib
- Ronnie O'Sullivan 3–1 Alexander Ursenbacher

==== Table ====
Pos.	Player	P	W	D	L	FW	FL	FD	HB	Pts
1	Ronnie O'Sullivan (ENG)	3	3	0	0	9	2	+7	121	9
2	Alexander Ursenbacher (SUI)	3	2	0	1	7	5	+2	105	6
3	Alfie Burden (ENG)	3	0	1	2	4	8	−4	79	1
4	Farakh Ajaib (PAK)	3	0	1	2	3	8	−5	79	1

=== Group 2 ===
Group 2 was played on 19 July.

==== Matches ====
- Judd Trump 2–2 Peng Yisong
- Jamie Clarke 3–0 Sean O'Sullivan
- Jamie Clarke 2–2 Peng Yisong
- Judd Trump 3–1 Sean O'Sullivan
- Sean O'Sullivan 3–1 Peng Yisong
- Judd Trump 2–2 Jamie Clarke

==== Table ====
Pos.	Player	P	W	D	L	FW	FL	FD	HB	Pts
1	Jamie Clarke (WAL)	3	1	2	0	7	4	+3	62	5
2	Judd Trump (ENG)	3	1	2	0	7	5	+2	76	5
3	Sean O'Sullivan (ENG)	3	1	0	2	4	7	−3	65	3
4	Peng Yisong (CHN)	3	0	2	1	5	7	−2	133	2

=== Group 3 ===
Group 3 was played on 7 July.

==== Matches ====
- Mark Selby 3–1 James Cahill
- Ben Woollaston 3–0 Zhang Jiankang
- Ben Woollaston 3–0 James Cahill
- Mark Selby 3–0 Zhang Jiankang
- Zhang Jiankang 1–3 James Cahill
- Mark Selby 1–3 Ben Woollaston

==== Table ====
Pos.	Player	P	W	D	L	FW	FL	FD	HB	Pts
1	Ben Woollaston (ENG)	3	3	0	0	9	1	+8	127	9
2	Mark Selby (ENG)	3	2	0	1	7	4	+3	113	6
3	James Cahill (ENG)	3	1	0	2	4	7	−3	70	3
4	Zhang Jiankang (CHN)	3	0	0	3	1	9	−8		0

=== Group 4 ===
Group 4 was played on 29 June.

==== Matches ====
- Zhao Xintong 3–1 Michael Holt
- Hammad Miah 2–2 Adam Duffy
- Hammad Miah 3–1 Michael Holt
- Zhao Xintong 3–0 Adam Duffy
- Adam Duffy 1–3 Michael Holt
- Zhao Xintong 3–0 Hammad Miah

==== Table ====
Pos.	Player	P	W	D	L	FW	FL	FD	HB	Pts
1	Zhao Xintong (CHN)	3	3	0	0	9	1	+8	105	9
2	Hammad Miah (ENG)	3	1	1	1	5	6	−1	57	4
3	Michael Holt (ENG)	3	1	0	2	5	7	−2	75	3
4	Adam Duffy (ENG)	3	0	1	2	3	8	−5		1

=== Group 5 ===
Group 5 was played on 11 July.

==== Matches ====
- Mark Williams 3–1 Rory McLeod
- Li Hang 3–1 Andrew Pagett
- Li Hang 2–2 Rory McLeod
- Mark Williams 3–0 Andrew Pagett
- Andrew Pagett 3–0 Rory McLeod
- Mark Williams 3–1 Li Hang

==== Table ====
Pos.	Player	P	W	D	L	FW	FL	FD	HB	Pts
1	Mark Williams (WAL)	3	3	0	0	9	2	+7	140	9
2	Li Hang (CHN)	3	1	1	1	6	6	0	111	4
3	Andrew Pagett (WAL)	3	1	0	2	4	7	−3	94	3
4	Rory McLeod (JAM)	3	0	1	2	4	8	−4	56	1

=== Group 6 ===
Group 6 was played on 30 June.

==== Matches ====
- Kyren Wilson 2–2 Luke Simmonds
- Zhang Anda 2–2 Michael Judge
- Zhang Anda 2–2 Luke Simmonds
- Kyren Wilson 2–2 Michael Judge
- Michael Judge 3–1 Luke Simmonds
- Kyren Wilson 2–2 Zhang Anda

==== Table ====
Pos.	Player	P	W	D	L	FW	FL	FD	HB	Pts
1	Michael Judge (IRL)	3	1	2	0	7	5	+2	77	5
2	Kyren Wilson (ENG)	3	0	3	0	6	6	0	98	3
3	Zhang Anda (CHN)	3	0	3	0	6	6	0	66	3
4	Luke Simmonds (ENG)	3	0	2	1	5	7	−2	65	2

=== Group 7 ===
Group 7 was played on 19 July.

==== Matches ====
- Shaun Murphy 2–2 Ben Mertens
- Liam Highfield 1–3 Xu Si
- Liam Highfield 1–3 Ben Mertens
- Shaun Murphy 3–0 Xu Si
- Xu Si 1–3 Ben Mertens
- Shaun Murphy 3–0 Liam Highfield

==== Table ====
Pos.	Player	P	W	D	L	FW	FL	FD	HB	Pts
1	Shaun Murphy (ENG)	3	2	1	0	8	2	+6	144	7
2	Ben Mertens (BEL)	3	2	1	0	8	4	+4	117	7
3	Xu Si (CHN)	3	1	0	2	4	7	−3	61	3
4	Liam Highfield (ENG)	3	0	0	3	2	9	−7	70	0

=== Group 8 ===
Group 8 was played on 21 July.

==== Matches ====
- Jack Lisowski 2–2 Julien Leclercq
- Mark Joyce 0–3 Michael White
- Mark Joyce 3–1 Julien Leclercq
- Jack Lisowski 3–1 Michael White
- Michael White 3–0 Julien Leclercq
- Jack Lisowski 1–3 Mark Joyce

==== Table ====
Pos.	Player	P	W	D	L	FW	FL	FD	HB	Pts
1	Michael White (WAL)	3	2	0	1	7	3	+4	107	6
2	Mark Joyce (ENG)	3	2	0	1	6	5	+1	65	6
3	Jack Lisowski (ENG)	3	1	1	1	6	6	0	70	4
4	Julien Leclercq (BEL)	3	0	1	2	3	8	−5	92	1

=== Group 9 ===
Group 9 was played on 6 July.

==== Matches ====
- Barry Hawkins 3–1 Ken Doherty
- Yuan Sijun 3–0 Lei Peifan
- Yuan Sijun 3–0 Ken Doherty
- Barry Hawkins 3–0 Lei Peifan
- Lei Peifan 2–2 Ken Doherty
- Barry Hawkins 0–3 Yuan Sijun

==== Table ====
Pos.	Player	P	W	D	L	FW	FL	FD	HB	Pts
1	Yuan Sijun (CHN)	3	3	0	0	9	0	+9	95	9
2	Barry Hawkins (ENG)	3	2	0	1	6	4	+2	105	6
3	Ken Doherty (IRL)	3	0	1	2	3	8	−5	52	1
4	Lei Peifan (CHN)	3	0	1	2	2	8	−6	56	1

=== Group 10 ===
Group 10 was played on 1 July.

==== Matches ====
- Luca Brecel 3–0 Zhao Jianbo
- Robbie Williams 2–2 Oliver Brown
- Robbie Williams 3–1 Zhao Jianbo
- Luca Brecel 3–1 Oliver Brown
- Oliver Brown 0–3 Zhao Jianbo
- Luca Brecel 2–2 Robbie Williams

==== Table ====
Pos.	Player	P	W	D	L	FW	FL	FD	HB	Pts
1	Luca Brecel (BEL)	3	2	1	0	8	3	+5	98	7
2	Robbie Williams (ENG)	3	1	2	0	7	5	+2	70	5
3	Zhao Jianbo (CHN)	3	1	0	2	4	6	−2	90	3
4	Oliver Brown (ENG)	3	0	1	2	3	8	−5		1

=== Group 11 ===
Group 11 was played on 18 July.

==== Matches ====
- Stuart Bingham 0–3 Peter Devlin
- Cao Yupeng 2–2 Peter Lines
- Cao Yupeng 2–2 Peter Devlin
- Stuart Bingham 3–0 Peter Lines
- Peter Lines 2–2 Peter Devlin
- Stuart Bingham 3–1 Cao Yupeng

==== Table ====
Pos.	Player	P	W	D	L	FW	FL	FD	HB	Pts
1	Stuart Bingham (ENG)	3	2	0	1	6	4	+2	69	6
2	Peter Devlin (ENG)	3	1	2	0	7	4	+3	61	5
3	Cao Yupeng (CHN)	3	0	2	1	5	7	−2	104	2
4	Peter Lines (ENG)	3	0	2	1	4	7	−3	72	2

=== Group 12 ===
Group 12 was played on 21 July.

==== Matches ====
- Mark Allen 3–0 Himanshu Jain
- Stuart Carrington 2–2 Jenson Kendrick
- Stuart Carrington 0–3 Himanshu Jain
- Mark Allen 3–1 Jenson Kendrick
- Jenson Kendrick 2–2 Himanshu Jain
- Mark Allen 3–1 Stuart Carrington

==== Table ====
Pos.	Player	P	W	D	L	FW	FL	FD	HB	Pts
1	Mark Allen (NIR)	3	3	0	0	9	2	+7	142	9
2	Himanshu Jain (IND)	3	1	1	1	5	5	0	64	4
3	Jenson Kendrick (ENG)	3	0	2	1	5	7	−2	62	2
4	Stuart Carrington (ENG)	3	0	1	2	3	8	−5	67	1

=== Group 13 ===
Group 13 was played on 28 June.

==== Matches ====
- David Grace 2–2 Ben Hancorn
- Craig Steadman 0–3 Aaron Hill
- Craig Steadman 2–2 Ben Hancorn
- David Grace 2–2 Aaron Hill
- Aaron Hill 2–2 Ben Hancorn
- David Grace 3–1 Craig Steadman

==== Table ====
Pos.	Player	P	W	D	L	FW	FL	FD	HB	Pts
1	Aaron Hill (IRL)	3	1	2	0	7	4	+3	101	5
2	David Grace (ENG)	3	1	2	0	7	5	+2	75	5
3	Ben Hancorn (ENG)	3	0	3	0	6	6	0	88	3
4	Craig Steadman (ENG)	3	0	1	2	3	8	−5	55	1

=== Group 14 ===
Group 14 was played on 18 July.

==== Matches ====
- Hossein Vafaei 3–0 Ryan Thomerson
- Tian Pengfei 3–0 Ng On-yee
- Tian Pengfei 3–1 Ryan Thomerson
- Hossein Vafaei 3–0 Ng On-yee
- Ng On-yee 1–3 Ryan Thomerson
- Hossein Vafaei 2–2 Tian Pengfei

==== Table ====
Pos.	Player	P	W	D	L	FW	FL	FD	HB	Pts
1	Hossein Vafaei (IRN)	3	2	1	0	8	2	+6	70	7
2	Tian Pengfei (CHN)	3	2	1	0	8	3	+5	103	7
3	Ryan Thomerson (AUS)	3	1	0	2	4	7	−3	99	3
4	Ng On-yee (HKG)	3	0	0	3	1	9	−8	94	0

=== Group 15 ===
Group 15 was played on 5 July.

==== Matches ====
- Ricky Walden 3–1 Andy Lee
- Jackson Page 1–3 Gerard Greene
- Jackson Page 3–1 Andy Lee
- Ricky Walden 2–2 Gerard Greene
- Gerard Greene 1–3 Andy Lee
- Ricky Walden 3–1 Jackson Page

==== Table ====
Pos.	Player	P	W	D	L	FW	FL	FD	HB	Pts
1	Ricky Walden (ENG)	3	2	1	0	8	4	+4	106	7
2	Gerard Greene (NIR)	3	1	1	1	6	6	0	65	4
3	Jackson Page (WAL)	3	1	0	2	5	7	−2	130	3
4	Andy Lee (HKG)	3	1	0	2	5	7	−2	125	3

=== Group 16 ===
Group 16 was played on 20 July.

==== Matches ====
- David Gilbert 3–0 Florian Nüßle
- Joe O'Connor 3–1 Zak Surety
- Joe O'Connor 1–3 Florian Nüßle
- David Gilbert 3–0 Zak Surety
- Zak Surety 0–3 Florian Nüßle
- David Gilbert 2–2 Joe O'Connor

==== Table ====
Pos.	Player	P	W	D	L	FW	FL	FD	HB	Pts
1	David Gilbert (ENG)	3	2	1	0	8	2	+6	100	7
2	Florian Nüßle (AUT)	3	2	0	1	6	4	+2	61	6
3	Joe O'Connor (ENG)	3	1	1	1	6	6	0	111	4
4	Zak Surety (ENG)	3	0	0	3	1	9	−8	55	0

=== Group 17 ===
Group 17 was played on 14 July.

==== Matches ====
- Ali Carter 3–0 Robbie McGuigan
- Wu Yize 3–1 Louis Heathcote
- Wu Yize 2–2 Robbie McGuigan
- Ali Carter 3–0 Louis Heathcote
- Louis Heathcote 2–2 Robbie McGuigan
- Ali Carter 2–2 Wu Yize

==== Table ====
Pos.	Player	P	W	D	L	FW	FL	FD	HB	Pts
1	Ali Carter (ENG)	3	2	1	0	8	2	+6	70	7
2	Wu Yize (CHN)	3	1	2	0	7	5	+2	120	5
3	Robbie McGuigan (NIR)	3	0	2	1	4	7	−3	88	2
4	Louis Heathcote (ENG)	3	0	1	2	3	8	−5	113	1

=== Group 18 ===
Group 18 was played on 13 July.

==== Matches ====
- Matthew Selt 2–2 Daniel Wells
- Dominic Dale 3–1 Duane Jones
- Dominic Dale 1–3 Daniel Wells
- Matthew Selt 2–2 Duane Jones
- Duane Jones 0–3 Daniel Wells
- Matthew Selt 2–2 Dominic Dale

==== Table ====
Pos.	Player	P	W	D	L	FW	FL	FD	HB	Pts
1	Daniel Wells (WAL)	3	2	1	0	8	3	+5	80	7
2	Dominic Dale (WAL)	3	1	1	1	6	6	0	88	4
3	Matthew Selt (ENG)	3	0	3	0	6	6	0	141	3
4	Duane Jones (WAL)	3	0	1	2	3	8	−5	80	1

=== Group 19 ===
Group 19 was played on 20 July.

==== Matches ====
- Jordan Brown 2–2 Ross Muir
- Mark Davis 2–2 Ross Muir
- Jordan Brown 3–1 Mark Davis
- Jordan Brown 3–0 Ross Muir
- Mark Davis 3–1 Ross Muir
- Jordan Brown 3–1 Mark Davis

==== Table ====
Pos.	Player	P	W	D	L	FW	FL	FD	HB	Pts
1	Jordan Brown (NIR)	4	3	1	0	11	4	+7	115	10
2	Mark Davis (ENG)	4	1	1	2	7	9	−2	104	4
3	Ross Muir (SCO)	4	0	2	2	5	10	−5	94	2

Jimmy White withdrew from the group due to travel issues.

=== Group 20 ===
Group 20 was played on 13 July.

==== Matches ====
- Zhou Yuelong 2–2 Fergal O'Brien
- Mark King 0–3 Chang Bingyu
- Mark King 3–1 Fergal O'Brien
- Zhou Yuelong 3–0 Chang Bingyu
- Chang Bingyu 3–0 Fergal O'Brien
- Zhou Yuelong 2–2 Mark King

==== Table ====
Pos.	Player	P	W	D	L	FW	FL	FD	HB	Pts
1	Chang Bingyu (CHN)	3	2	0	1	6	3	+3	108	6
2	Zhou Yuelong (CHN)	3	1	2	0	7	4	+3	135	5
3	Mark King (ENG)	3	1	1	1	5	6	−1	58	4
4	Fergal O'Brien (IRL)	3	0	1	2	3	8	−5	59	1

=== Group 21 ===
Group 21 was played on 12 July.

==== Matches ====
- Stephen Maguire 2–2 Si Jiahui
- Matthew Stevens 2–2 Mitchell Mann
- Matthew Stevens 1–3 Si Jiahui
- Stephen Maguire 2–2 Mitchell Mann
- Mitchell Mann 2–2 Si Jiahui
- Stephen Maguire 3–0 Matthew Stevens

==== Table ====
Pos.	Player	P	W	D	L	FW	FL	FD	HB	Pts
1	Stephen Maguire (SCO)	3	1	2	0	7	4	+3	87	5
2	Si Jiahui (CHN)	3	1	2	0	7	5	+2	93	5
3	Mitchell Mann (ENG)	3	0	3	0	6	6	0	80	3
4	Matthew Stevens (WAL)	3	0	1	2	3	8	−5	81	1

=== Group 22 ===
Group 22 was played on 12 July.

==== Matches ====
- Jimmy Robertson 3–0 Ian Martin
- Thepchaiya Un-Nooh 2–2 Marco Fu
- Thepchaiya Un-Nooh 3–1 Ian Martin
- Jimmy Robertson 2–2 Marco Fu
- Marco Fu 0–3 Ian Martin
- Jimmy Robertson 2–2 Thepchaiya Un-Nooh

==== Table ====
Pos.	Player	P	W	D	L	FW	FL	FD	HB	Pts
1	Jimmy Robertson (ENG)	3	1	2	0	7	4	+3	133	5
2	Thepchaiya Un-Nooh (THA)	3	1	2	0	7	5	+2	118	5
3	Ian Martin (ENG)	3	1	0	2	4	6	−2		3
4	Marco Fu (HKG)	3	0	2	1	4	7	−3	95	2

=== Group 23 ===
Group 23 was played on 7 July.

==== Matches ====
- Joe Perry 2–2 Andrew Higginson
- Elliot Slessor 3–1 Lukas Kleckers
- Elliot Slessor 2–2 Andrew Higginson
- Joe Perry 3–0 Lukas Kleckers
- Lukas Kleckers 0–3 Andrew Higginson
- Joe Perry 1–3 Elliot Slessor

==== Table ====
Pos.	Player	P	W	D	L	FW	FL	FD	HB	Pts
1	Elliot Slessor (ENG)	3	2	1	0	8	4	+4	79	7
2	Andrew Higginson (ENG)	3	1	2	0	7	4	+3	95	5
3	Joe Perry (ENG)	3	1	1	1	6	5	+1	117	4
4	Lukas Kleckers (GER)	3	0	0	3	1	9	−8		0

=== Group 24 ===
Group 24 was played on 28 June.

==== Matches ====
- Robert Milkins 3–0 Sanderson Lam
- Andy Hicks 3–1 Allan Taylor
- Andy Hicks 3–1 Sanderson Lam
- Robert Milkins 3–1 Allan Taylor
- Allan Taylor 1–3 Sanderson Lam
- Robert Milkins 2–2 Andy Hicks

==== Table ====
Pos.	Player	P	W	D	L	FW	FL	FD	HB	Pts
1	Robert Milkins (ENG)	3	2	1	0	8	3	+5	78	7
2	Andy Hicks (ENG)	3	2	1	0	8	4	+4	93	7
3	Sanderson Lam (ENG)	3	1	0	2	4	7	−3	100	3
4	Allan Taylor (ENG)	3	0	0	3	3	9	−6	54	0

=== Group 25 ===
Group 25 was played on 14 July.

==== Matches ====
- Ryan Day 2–2 Dylan Emery
- Pang Junxu 3–1 Reanne Evans
- Pang Junxu 3–1 Dylan Emery
- Ryan Day 3–0 Reanne Evans
- Reanne Evans 2–2 Dylan Emery
- Ryan Day 2–2 Pang Junxu

==== Table ====
Pos.	Player	P	W	D	L	FW	FL	FD	HB	Pts
1	Pang Junxu (CHN)	3	2	1	0	8	4	+4	137	7
2	Ryan Day (WAL)	3	1	2	0	7	4	+3	125	5
3	Dylan Emery (WAL)	3	0	2	1	5	7	−2	103	2
4	Reanne Evans (ENG)	3	0	1	2	3	8	−5	55	1

=== Group 26 ===
Group 26 was played on 30 June.

==== Matches ====
- Tom Ford 1–3 Anton Kazakov
- Chris Wakelin 3–1 Ian Burns
- Chris Wakelin 3–0 Anton Kazakov
- Tom Ford 2–2 Ian Burns
- Ian Burns 3–1 Anton Kazakov
- Tom Ford 3–0 Chris Wakelin

==== Table ====
Pos.	Player	P	W	D	L	FW	FL	FD	HB	Pts
1	Chris Wakelin (ENG)	3	2	0	1	6	4	+2	77	6
2	Tom Ford (ENG)	3	1	1	1	6	5	+1	76	4
3	Ian Burns (ENG)	3	1	1	1	6	6	0	131	4
4	Anton Kazakov (UKR)	3	1	0	2	4	7	−3	57	3

=== Group 27 ===
Group 27 was played on 4 July.

==== Matches ====
- Jamie Jones 3–1 Andres Petrov
- Sam Craigie 2–2 David Lilley
- Sam Craigie 2–2 Andres Petrov
- Jamie Jones 3–0 David Lilley
- David Lilley 3–0 Andres Petrov
- Jamie Jones 2–2 Sam Craigie

==== Table ====
Pos.	Player	P	W	D	L	FW	FL	FD	HB	Pts
1	Jamie Jones (WAL)	3	2	1	0	8	3	+5	134	7
2	David Lilley (ENG)	3	1	1	1	5	5	0	138	4
3	Sam Craigie (ENG)	3	0	3	0	6	6	0	71	3
4	Andres Petrov (EST)	3	0	1	2	3	8	−5		1

=== Group 28 ===
Group 28 was played on 11 July.

==== Matches ====
- Gary Wilson 3–0 Harvey Chandler
- Jak Jones 2–2 Barry Pinches
- Jak Jones 3–0 Harvey Chandler
- Gary Wilson 2–2 Barry Pinches
- Barry Pinches 2–2 Harvey Chandler
- Gary Wilson 3–0 Jak Jones

==== Table ====
Pos.	Player	P	W	D	L	FW	FL	FD	HB	Pts
1	Gary Wilson (ENG)	3	2	1	0	8	2	+6	115	7
2	Jak Jones (WAL)	3	1	1	1	5	5	0	133	4
3	Barry Pinches (ENG)	3	0	3	0	6	6	0	61	3
4	Harvey Chandler (ENG)	3	0	1	2	2	8	−6		1

=== Group 29 ===
Group 29 was played on 1 July.

==== Matches ====
- Lu Ning 3–1 John Astley
- Oliver Lines 0–3 Chen Zifan
- Oliver Lines 0–3 John Astley
- Lu Ning 3–0 Chen Zifan
- Chen Zifan 2–2 John Astley
- Lu Ning 3–1 Oliver Lines

==== Table ====
Pos.	Player	P	W	D	L	FW	FL	FD	HB	Pts
1	Lu Ning (CHN)	3	3	0	0	9	2	+7	135	9
2	John Astley (ENG)	3	1	1	1	6	5	+1	60	4
3	Chen Zifan (CHN)	3	1	1	1	5	5	0	75	4
4	Oliver Lines (ENG)	3	0	0	3	1	9	−8	56	0

=== Group 30 ===
Group 30 was played on 6 July.

==== Matches ====
- Graeme Dott 3–1 Haydon Pinhey
- Lyu Haotian 2–2 Fraser Patrick
- Lyu Haotian 3–1 Haydon Pinhey
- Graeme Dott 1–3 Fraser Patrick
- Fraser Patrick 0–3 Haydon Pinhey
- Graeme Dott 0–3 Lyu Haotian

==== Table ====
Pos.	Player	P	W	D	L	FW	FL	FD	HB	Pts
1	Lyu Haotian (CHN)	3	2	1	0	8	3	+5	135	7
2	Fraser Patrick (SCO)	3	1	1	1	5	6	−1	101	4
3	Haydon Pinhey (ENG)	3	1	0	2	5	6	−1	100	3
4	Graeme Dott (SCO)	3	1	0	2	4	7	−3	72	3

=== Group 31 ===
Group 31 was played on 29 June.

==== Matches ====
- Noppon Saengkham 3–0 Steven Hallworth
- Anthony Hamilton 2–2 Ashley Hugill
- Anthony Hamilton 3–0 Steven Hallworth
- Noppon Saengkham 3–1 Ashley Hugill
- Ashley Hugill 2–2 Steven Hallworth
- Noppon Saengkham 1–3 Anthony Hamilton

==== Table ====
Pos.	Player	P	W	D	L	FW	FL	FD	HB	Pts
1	Anthony Hamilton (ENG)	3	2	1	0	8	3	+5	130	7
2	Noppon Saengkham (THA)	3	2	0	1	7	4	+3	90	6
3	Ashley Hugill (ENG)	3	0	2	1	5	7	−2	65	2
4	Steven Hallworth (ENG)	3	0	1	2	2	8	−6	96	1

=== Group 32 ===
Group 32 was played on 5 July.

==== Matches ====
- Xiao Guodong 3–1 Rod Lawler
- Scott Donaldson 2–2 Nutcharut Wongharuthai
- Scott Donaldson 2–2 Rod Lawler
- Xiao Guodong 3–1 Nutcharut Wongharuthai
- Nutcharut Wongharuthai 1–3 Rod Lawler
- Xiao Guodong 3–1 Scott Donaldson

==== Table ====
Pos.	Player	P	W	D	L	FW	FL	FD	HB	Pts
1	Xiao Guodong (CHN)	3	3	0	0	9	3	+6	112	9
2	Rod Lawler (ENG)	3	1	1	1	6	6	0	62	4
3	Scott Donaldson (SCO)	3	0	2	1	5	7	−2	97	2
4	Nutcharut Wongharuthai (THA)	3	0	1	2	4	8	−4	54	1

== Stage Two ==
Stage Two consisted of eight groups, each containing four players.

=== Order of play ===
Date	Group
25 July	Group E
25 July	Group F
26 July	Group C
26 July	Group H

Date	Group
27 July	Group A
27 July	Group D
28 July	Group B
28 July	Group G

=== Group A ===
Group A was played on 27 July.

==== Matches ====
- Ronnie O'Sullivan 0–3 Yuan Sijun
- Ali Carter 1–3 Pang Junxu
- Ali Carter 2–2 Yuan Sijun
- Ronnie O'Sullivan 1–3 Pang Junxu
- Pang Junxu 2–2 Yuan Sijun
- Ronnie O'Sullivan 3–0 Ali Carter

==== Table ====
Pos.	Player	P	W	D	L	FW	FL	FD	HB	Pts
1	Pang Junxu (CHN)	3	2	1	0	8	4	+4	104	7
2	Yuan Sijun (CHN)	3	1	2	0	7	4	+3	74	5
3	Ronnie O'Sullivan (ENG)	3	1	0	2	4	6	−2	127	3
4	Ali Carter (ENG)	3	0	1	2	3	8	−5	80	1

=== Group B ===
Group B was played on 28 July.

==== Matches ====
- Luca Brecel 2–2 Daniel Wells
- Chris Wakelin 3–0 Jamie Clarke
- Chris Wakelin 2–2 Daniel Wells
- Luca Brecel 3–0 Jamie Clarke
- Jamie Clarke 0–3 Daniel Wells
- Luca Brecel 3–0 Chris Wakelin

==== Table ====
Pos.	Player	P	W	D	L	FW	FL	FD	HB	Pts
1	Luca Brecel (BEL)	3	2	1	0	8	2	+6	114	7
2	Daniel Wells (WAL)	3	1	2	0	7	4	+3	79	5
3	Chris Wakelin (ENG)	3	1	1	1	5	5	0	139	4
4	Jamie Clarke (WAL)	3	0	0	3	0	9	−9	52	0

=== Group C ===
Group C was played on 26 July.

==== Matches ====
- Stuart Bingham 3–0 Ben Woollaston
- Jordan Brown 2–2 Jamie Jones
- Jordan Brown 1–3 Ben Woollaston
- Stuart Bingham 3–1 Jamie Jones
- Jamie Jones 3–0 Ben Woollaston
- Stuart Bingham 2–2 Jordan Brown

==== Table ====
Pos.	Player	P	W	D	L	FW	FL	FD	HB	Pts
1	Stuart Bingham (ENG)	3	2	1	0	8	3	+5	120	7
2	Jamie Jones (WAL)	3	1	1	1	6	5	+1	130	4
3	Ben Woollaston (ENG)	3	1	0	2	3	7	−4	100	3
4	Jordan Brown (NIR)	3	0	2	1	5	7	−2	117	2

=== Group D ===
Group D was played on 27 July.

==== Matches ====
- Zhao Xintong 3–0 Chang Bingyu
- Mark Allen 0–3 Gary Wilson
- Mark Allen 3–1 Chang Bingyu
- Zhao Xintong 3–0 Gary Wilson
- Gary Wilson 3–1 Chang Bingyu
- Zhao Xintong 2–2 Mark Allen

==== Table ====
Pos.	Player	P	W	D	L	FW	FL	FD	HB	Pts
1	Zhao Xintong (CHN)	3	2	1	0	8	2	+6	145	7
2	Gary Wilson (ENG)	3	2	0	1	6	4	+2	115	6
3	Mark Allen (NIR)	3	1	1	1	5	6	−1	104	4
4	Chang Bingyu (CHN)	3	0	0	3	2	9	−7	136	0

=== Group E ===
Group E was played on 25 July.

==== Matches ====
- Mark Williams 3–0 Aaron Hill
- Stephen Maguire 1–3 Lu Ning
- Stephen Maguire 3–0 Aaron Hill
- Mark Williams 0–3 Lu Ning
- Lu Ning 2–2 Aaron Hill
- Mark Williams 0–3 Stephen Maguire

==== Table ====
Pos.	Player	P	W	D	L	FW	FL	FD	HB	Pts
1	Lu Ning (CHN)	3	2	1	0	8	3	+5	129	7
2	Stephen Maguire (SCO)	3	2	0	1	7	3	+4	73	6
3	Mark Williams (WAL)	3	1	0	2	3	6	−3	133	3
4	Aaron Hill (IRL)	3	0	1	2	2	8	−6	73	1

=== Group F ===
Group F was played on 25 July.

==== Matches ====
- Hossein Vafaei 3–0 Michael Judge
- Jimmy Robertson 2–2 Lyu Haotian
- Jimmy Robertson 2–2 Michael Judge
- Hossein Vafaei 0–3 Lyu Haotian
- Lyu Haotian 3–1 Michael Judge
- Hossein Vafaei 2–2 Jimmy Robertson

==== Table ====
Pos.	Player	P	W	D	L	FW	FL	FD	HB	Pts
1	Lyu Haotian (CHN)	3	2	1	0	8	3	+5	79	7
2	Hossein Vafaei (IRN)	3	1	1	1	5	5	0	124	4
3	Jimmy Robertson (ENG)	3	0	3	0	6	6	0	87	3
4	Michael Judge (IRL)	3	0	1	2	3	8	−5	76	1

=== Group G ===
Group G was played on 28 July.

==== Matches ====
- Shaun Murphy 3–1 Elliot Slessor
- Ricky Walden 2–2 Anthony Hamilton
- Ricky Walden 3–0 Elliot Slessor
- Shaun Murphy 3–1 Anthony Hamilton
- Anthony Hamilton 3–0 Elliot Slessor
- Shaun Murphy 1–3 Ricky Walden

==== Table ====
Pos.	Player	P	W	D	L	FW	FL	FD	HB	Pts
1	Ricky Walden (ENG)	3	2	1	0	8	3	+5	135	7
2	Shaun Murphy (ENG)	3	2	0	1	7	5	+2	112	6
3	Anthony Hamilton (ENG)	3	1	1	1	6	5	+1	116	4
4	Elliot Slessor (ENG)	3	0	0	3	1	9	−8	53	0

=== Group H ===
Group H was played on 26 July.

==== Matches ====
- David Gilbert 1–3 Michael White
- Robert Milkins 2–2 Xiao Guodong
- Robert Milkins 0–3 Michael White
- David Gilbert 1–3 Xiao Guodong
- Xiao Guodong 3–1 Michael White
- David Gilbert 2–2 Robert Milkins

==== Table ====
Pos.	Player	P	W	D	L	FW	FL	FD	HB	Pts
1	Xiao Guodong (CHN)	3	2	1	0	8	4	+4	127	7
2	Michael White (WAL)	3	2	0	1	7	4	+3	131	6
3	Robert Milkins (ENG)	3	0	2	1	4	7	−3	75	2
4	David Gilbert (ENG)	3	0	1	2	4	8	−4	102	1

== Stage Three ==
Stage Three consisted of two groups, each containing four players.

=== Winners' group 1 ===
Winners' group 1 was played on 29 July.

==== Winners' group 1 matches ====
- Stuart Bingham 2–2 Pang Junxu
- Ricky Walden 2–2 Lu Ning
- Ricky Walden 2–2 Pang Junxu
- Stuart Bingham 1–3 Lu Ning
- Lu Ning 3–1 Pang Junxu
- Stuart Bingham 2–2 Ricky Walden

==== Winners' group 1 table ====
Pos.	Player	P	W	D	L	FW	FL	FD	HB	Pts
1	Lu Ning (CHN)	3	2	1	0	8	4	+5	139	7
2	Ricky Walden (ENG)	3	0	3	0	6	6	0	130	3
3	Stuart Bingham (ENG)	3	0	2	1	5	7	−2	131	2
4	Pang Junxu (CHN)	3	0	2	1	5	7	−2	107	2

=== Winners' group 2 ===
Winners' group 2 was played on 29 July.

==== Winners' group 2 matches ====
- Zhao Xintong 3–0 Lyu Haotian
- Luca Brecel 1–3 Xiao Guodong
- Luca Brecel 3–0 Lyu Haotian
- Zhao Xintong 3–1 Xiao Guodong
- Xiao Guodong 3–0 Lyu Haotian
- Zhao Xintong 0–3 Luca Brecel

==== Winners' group 2 table ====
Pos.	Player	P	W	D	L	FW	FL	FD	HB	Pts
1	Luca Brecel (BEL)	3	2	0	1	7	3	+4	108	6
2	Xiao Guodong (CHN)	3	2	0	1	7	4	+3	111	6
3	Zhao Xintong (CHN)	3	2	0	1	6	4	+2	138	6
4	Lyu Haotian (CHN)	3	0	0	3	0	9	−9		0

== Final ==
Final: Best of 5 frames. Referee: John Pellew; Morningside Arena, Leicester, England, 29 July 2022.
Lu Ning; China	1–3	Luca Brecel; Belgium
Frame scores: 67–68, 73–0, 15–72, 0–125 (100)
73	Highest break	100
0	Century breaks	1

== Century breaks ==
A total of 106 century breaks were made during the tournament.

- 145, 138, 125, 123, 105, 105, 101, 101 – Zhao Xintong
- 144, 112, 109, 103, 100 – Shaun Murphy
- 142, 104 – Mark Allen
- 141, 106 – Matthew Selt
- 140, 133 – Mark Williams
- 139, 135, 129 – Lu Ning
- 139, 108 – Chris Wakelin
- 138 – David Lilley
- 137, 136, 108, 107, 104 – Pang Junxu
- 136, 108 – Chang Bingyu
- 135, 132, 106 – Zhou Yuelong
- 135, 130, 106 – Ricky Walden
- 135 – Lyu Haotian
- 134, 130, 102 – Jamie Jones
- 133 – Jak Jones
- 133 – Peng Yisong
- 133 – Jimmy Robertson
- 131, 130, 108, 107 – Michael White
- 131, 120 – Stuart Bingham
- 131, 111 – Ian Burns
- 130, 116, 114, 106 – Anthony Hamilton
- 130 – Jackson Page
- 127, 121 – Ronnie O'Sullivan
- 127, 112, 111, 103, 103, 101 – Xiao Guodong
- 127, 100 – Ben Woollaston
- 125 – Ryan Day
- 125 – Andy Lee
- 124, 123, 117 – Hossein Vafaei
- 120, 101 – Wu Yize
- 118 – Thepchaiya Un-Nooh
- 117, 115, 111, 108, 100 – Jordan Brown
- 117 – Ben Mertens
- 117 – Joe Perry
- 115, 115 – Gary Wilson
- 114, 108, 100 – Luca Brecel
- 113 – Louis Heathcote
- 113 – Mark Selby
- 111, 100 – Li Hang
- 111 – Joe O'Connor
- 105, 102 – Alexander Ursenbacher
- 105 – Barry Hawkins
- 104 – Cao Yupeng
- 104 – Mark Davis
- 103 – Dylan Emery
- 103 – Tian Pengfei
- 102, 100 – David Gilbert
- 101 – Aaron Hill
- 101 – Fraser Patrick
- 100 – Sanderson Lam
- 100 – Haydon Pinhey
