= 1991 Belgian Masters =

Invitational snooker tournament

Tournament information
- Dates: 17–21 September 1991
- City: Antwerp
- Country: Belgium
- Format: Non-ranking event
- Total prize fund: £75,000
- Winner's share: £30,000

Final
- Champion: Mike Hallett (ENG)
- Runner-up: Neal Foulds (ENG)
- Score: 9–7

The 1991 Belgian Masters (also referred to as the 1991 Humo Belgian Masters for the purposes of sponsorship) was a professional non-ranking snooker tournament that took place between 17 and 21 September 1991 in Antwerp, Belgium. Mike Hallett won the title, defeating Neal Foulds 9–7 in the final. Hallett was awarded £30,000 prize money as winner, with Foulds receiving £15,000 as runner-up, and losing semi-finalists getting £10,000 each.

== Results ==
Players in bold denote match winners.

**First round** Best-of-5 frames
**Steve Lemmens (BEL)**	**3**
Bart van Ginneken (BEL)	0
**Alain de Cock (BEL)**	**3**
Mario Lennoye (BEL)	1
**Yvan van Velthoven (BEL)**	**3**
Patrick Delsemme (BEL)	2
**Peter Blomme (BEL)**	**3**
Eric van der Linden (BEL)	1

**Second round** Best-of-5 frames
**Martin Clark (ENG)**	**3**
Steve Lemmens (BEL)	1
**Neal Foulds (ENG)**	**3**
Alain de Cock (BEL)	0
**Steve James (ENG)**	**3**
Yvan van Velthoven (BEL)	0
**Mike Hallett (ENG)**	**3**
Peter Blomme (BEL)	0

**Quarter-finals**; Best-of-7 frames
**(England) John Parrott**	**4**
(England) Martin Clark	0
**(England) Neal Foulds**	**4**
(England) Gary Wilkinson	1
**(England) Jimmy White**	**4**
(England) Steve James	1
**(England) Mike Hallett**	**4**
(England) Steve Davis	3

**Semi-finals**; Best-of-11 frames
(England) John Parrott	5
**(England) Neal Foulds**	**6**
(England) Jimmy White	5
**(England) Mike Hallett**	**6**

**Final**; Best-of-17 frames
(England) Neal Foulds	7
**(England) Mike Hallett**	**9**
