= Belgian Masters =

Tournament information
- Country: Belgium
- Established: 1990
- Organisation(s): WPBSA
- Format: Non-ranking event
- Final year: 1995
- Final champion: (Wales) Matthew Stevens

The Belgian Masters was a non-ranking snooker tournament staged between 1990 and 1992, then revived for a single event in December 1995. John Parrott won the inaugural tournament in 1990, with Mike Hallett winning the 1991 edition and James Wattana victorious in 1992. Matthew Stevens won the final tournament, which was revived for one year, in December 1995.

== Winners ==
Year	Winner	Runner-up	Final score	Season
1990	(England) John Parrott	(England) Jimmy White	9–6	1990/91
1991	(England) Mike Hallett	(England) Neal Foulds	9–7	1991/92
1992	(Thailand) James Wattana	(England) John Parrott	10–5	1992/93
1995	(Wales) Matthew Stevens	(Belgium) Patrick Delsemme	7–1	1995/96
