= Belgian Amateur Championship (snooker) =

Tournament information
- Country: Belgium
- Established: 1984
- Organisation(s): Belgium Billiards and Snooker Association
- Format: Amateur event
- Recent edition: 2026
- Current champion: Kevin Hanssens

The Belgian Amateur Championship is an annual snooker competition played in the Belgium and is the highest ranking amateur event in the Belgium.

The competition was established in 1984, and was won by Mario Lannoye who would go on to win six of the first eight championships. In 2026, Kevin Hanssens broke a three-way tie with Mario Lannoye and Bjorn Haneveer for most wins when he won his seventh title. Luca Brecel became the youngest winner in the history of championship in 2010 at the age of 14 years.

The championship is currently held by Kevin Hanssens who defeated Jesse Schelfhaut 6–1 in the final of the 2026 championship.

== Winners ==
Year	Winner	Runner-up	Final score	City
1984	Mario Lannoye	George Dennef	5–0	Ostend
1985	Mario Lannoye	Peter De Waele	7–1	Middelkerke
1986	Yvan Van Velthoven	Mario Lannoye	7–6	Leuven
1987	Mario Lannoye	Steve Lemmens	7–0	Zele
1988	Mario Lannoye	Yvan Van Velthoven	7–6	Antwerp
1989	Mario Lannoye	Yvan Van Velthoven	7–2	Antwerp
1990	Steve Lemmens	Mario Lannoye	7–2	Antwerp
1991	Mario Lannoye	Peter Blomme	6–1	Antwerp
1992	Yvan Van Velthoven	Mario Geudens	7–5	Antwerp
1993	Danny Lathouwers	Stefan Van Der Borght	7–2	Antwerp
1994	Yvan Van Velthoven	Danny Lathouwers	7–3	Antwerp
1995	Patrick Delsemme	Steve Lemmens	7–3	Antwerp
1996	Bjorn Haneveer	Steve Lemmens	7–6	Antwerp
1997	Patrick Delsemme	Steve Lemmens	7–5	Antwerp
1998	Bjorn Haneveer	Mario Geudens	7–3	Antwerp
1999	Mario Geudens	Bjorn Haneveer	7–5	Antwerp
2000	Bjorn Haneveer	Alain De Cock	7–1	Antwerp
2001	Bjorn Haneveer	Mario Geudens	7–3	Geraardsbergen
2002	Jim Spapen	Mario Geudens	7–4	Geraardsbergen
2003	Nico Devlies	Peter Bullen	7–1	Duffel
2004	Kevin Van Hove	Jim Spapen	7–1	Duffel
2005	Bjorn Haneveer	Nico Devlies	7–4	Duffel
2006	Jim Spapen	Yvan Van Velthoven	7–6	Alken
2007	Bjorn Haneveer	Patrick Delsemme	7–6	Alken
2008	Danny Lathouwers	Kevin Van Hove	7–2	Alken
2009	Mario Geudens	Kevin Van Hove	7–3	Duffel
2010	Luca Brecel	Bjorn Haneveer	7–4	Mol
2011	Peter Bullen	Bjorn Haneveer	7–3	Duffel
2012	Yvan Van Velthoven	Kevin Van Hove	7–6	Gander
2013	Luca Brecel	Yvan Van Velthoven	7–1	Lanklaar
2014	Luca Brecel	Yvan Van Velthoven	7–5	Dilsen-Stokkem
2015	Peter Bullen	Tomasz Skalski	7–5	Sint-Truiden
2016	Kevin Hanssens	Peter Bullen	7–3	Sint-Truiden
2017	Jeff Jacobs	Kevin Van Hove	7–4	Sint-Truiden
2018	Kevin Van Hove	Julien Leclercq	7–5	Sint-Truiden
2019	Kevin Hanssens	Kristof Vermeiren	7–2	Hasselt
2020	Tournament Not Held			
2021	Tournament Not Held			
2022	Kevin Hanssens	Wesley Pelgrims	7–5	Lochristi
2023	Kevin Hanssens	Sybren Sokolowski	7–0	Lochristi
2024	Kevin Hanssens	Wesley Pelgrims	7–4	Lochristi
2025	Kevin Hanssens	Wesley Pelgrims	5–2	Glabbeek
2026	Kevin Hanssens	Jesse Schelfhaut	6–1	Zele

== Stats ==
=== Finalists ===
Rank	Name	Winner	Runner-up	Finals
1	Kevin Hanssens	7	0	7
2	Bjorn Haneveer	6	3	9
3	Mario Lannoye	6	2	8
4	Yvan Van Velthoven	4	5	9
5	Luca Brecel	3	0	3
6	Mario Geudens	2	4	6
6	Kevin Van Hove	2	4	6
8	Peter Bullen	2	2	4
9	Patrick Delsemme	2	1	3
9	Danny Lathouwers	2	1	3
9	Jim Spapen	2	1	3
12	Steve Lemmens	1	4	5
13	Nico Devlies	1	1	2
14	Jeff Jacobs	1	0	1
15	Wesley Pelgrims	0	3	3
16	Tomasz Skalski	0	1	1
16	Alain De Cock	0	1	1
16	Stefan Van Der Borght	0	1	1
16	Peter Blomme	0	1	1
16	Peter De Waele	0	1	1
16	George Dennef	0	1	1
16	Julien Leclercq	0	1	1
16	Jesse Schelfhaut	0	1	1
16	Sybren Sokolowski	0	1	1
16	Kristof Vermeiren	0	1	1
