= 1990 Belgian Masters =

Snooker tournament, held September 1990 in Antwerp

Belgian Masters
Tournament information
- Dates: September 1990
- Venue: Sporthal Schijnpoort
- City: Antwerp
- Country: Belgium
- Format: Non-ranking event
- Winner's share: £30,000
- Highest break: John Parrott (120)

Final
- Champion: (England) John Parrott
- Runner-up: (England) Jimmy White
- Score: 9–6

The 1990 Belgian Masters was an invitational snooker tournament played at the Sporthal Schijnpoort in Antwerp in September 1990. John Parrott won the title by beating Jimmy White 9–6 in the final. The final was televised live in Belgium. White won the first frame of the final with a break of 104. Parrott made the highest break of the competition, 120, in the thirteenth frame of the final, and won four of the last five frames to claim victory at 9–6.

== Prize Fund ==
The event was sponsored by HUMO and prize money was awarded as follows:

- Winner: £30,000
- Runner-up £15,000
- Semi-finals: £10,000
- Quarter-finals £1,500
- Highest break: £4,000

== Main draw ==
First round Best of 9 frames
(Wales) Doug Mountjoy	3
(Belgium) P. Delsemme	1
(Wales) Terry Griffiths	3
(Belgium) D. Lathouwers	0
(England) Dean Reynolds	3
(Belgium) S. Lemmens	2
(England) Mike Hallett	3
(Belgium) M. Lannoye	2

Quarter-finals; Best of 9 frames
(Scotland) Stephen Hendry	5
(Wales) Doug Mountjoy	2
(England) John Parrott	5
(Wales) Terry Griffiths	1
(England) Jimmy White	5
(England) Dean Reynolds	0
(England) Steve Davis	5
(England) Mike Hallett	1

Semi-finals; Best of 9 frames
(Scotland) Stephen Hendry	3
(England) John Parrott	5
(England) Jimmy White	5
(England) Steve Davis	4

Final; Best of 17 frames
(England) John Parrott	9
(England) Jimmy White	6
