= John Pellew (snooker referee) =

Welsh snooker referee (born 1955)

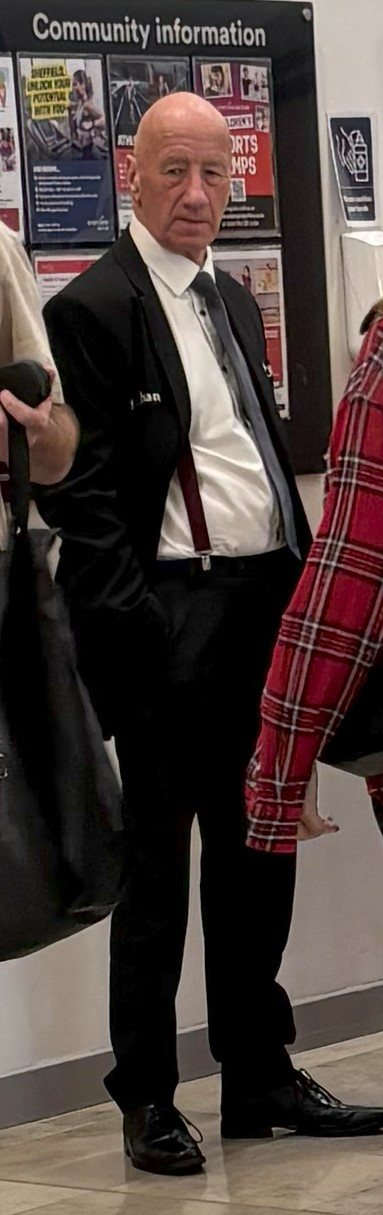
- Pellew in 2025

Personal information
- Born: 30 January 1955 (age 71) Llanelli, Wales

Sport
- Country: Wales
- Sport: Snooker
- Professional: 2005–present

John Pellew (born 30 January 1955) is a Welsh snooker referee from Llanelli.

== Career ==
Pellew has been an active snooker player since he was 15 years old, with a highest break of 68. He became a Grade III referee in 2002, and Grade II in 2004. He has been working as a professional referee since 2005. He has officiated at six maximum breaks in professional tournaments, and three ranking tournament finals.

== List of finals ==
=== Ranking tournaments ===
- 2022 Championship League
- 2023 Welsh Open
- 2025 Championship League

=== Amateur tournaments ===
- Welsh Amateur Championship
- 2022 World Women's Snooker Championship

== See also ==
- List of snooker referees
