= Bjorn Haneveer =

Belgian snooker player

Personal information
- Born: 4 September 1976 (age 50)

Sport
- Country: Belgium
- Sport: Snooker
- Professional: 1993–1997, 1998–2006, 2009–2011
- Highest ranking: 53 (2004/05)
- Best ranking finish: Last 16 (x2)
Medal record
Men's snooker
Representing Belgium
World Games
Gold medal – first place	2001 Akita	Individual
Bronze medal – third place	2005 Duisburg	Individual

Bjorn Haneveer (born 4 September 1976) is a Belgian former professional snooker player.

== Career ==
Haneveer is a six-time Belgian snooker champion (last title won in May 2007 vs Patrick Delsemme) He reached the final of the EBSA European Snooker Championship in three consecutive years, defeating David Bell in the 1999 final and Kurt Maflin in 2001, while in 2000 he lost to Craig Butler.

Haneveer won the snooker gold medal at the sixth World Games held in Akita, Japan, in 2001, and took the bronze medal at the seventh World Games held in Germany in 2005. He made maximum breaks of 147 at the Belgian Championships in 1996 and 2001, and at the European Championships in 2003.

He was a Main Tour professional for many years. Haneveer announced on in November 2011 that he would retire from professional snooker after the PTC 9 tournament, due to excessive expenses.

== Career finals ==
=== Non-ranking finals: 1 (1 title) ===
Outcome	No.	Year	Championship	Opponent in the final	Score
Winner	1.	2001	World Games	(Philippines) Marlon Manalo	4–3

=== Pro-am finals: 12 (7 titles) ===
Outcome	No.	Year	Championship	Opponent in the final	Score
Winner	1.	2003	Swiss Open	(England) Ian McCulloch	5–4
Winner	2.	2004	Dutch Open	(Netherlands) Lennon Starkey	6–1
Winner	3.	2005	Dutch Open (2)	(England) Michael Holt	6–1
Winner	4.	2009	3 Kings Open	(Republic of Ireland) Richard McHugh	5–4
Winner	5.	2009	Dutch Open (3)	(England) Matthew Couch	6–3
Runner-up	1.	2010	Vienna Snooker Open	(England) Stephen Lee	4–5
Runner-up	2.	2010	Dutch Open	(England) Barry Pinches	3–6
Runner-up	3.	2012	3 Kings Open	(Malta) Tony Drago	3–5
Winner	6.	2012	Dutch Open (4)	(Netherlands) Gerrit bij de Leij	7–3
Runner-up	4.	2013	Dutch Open (2)	(Belgium) Luca Brecel	3–5
Runner-up	5.	2017	3 Kings Open (2)	(Switzerland) Alexander Ursenbacher	1–5
Winner	7.	2017	Belgium Snooker Open	(Belgium) Ben Mertens	6–5

=== Amateur finals: 15 (10 titles) ===
Outcome	No.	Year	Championship	Opponent in the final	Score
Winner	1.	1996	Belgian Amateur Championship	(Belgium) Steve Lemmens	7–6
Runner-up	1.	1997	IBSF World Under-21 Championship	(Hong Kong) Marco Fu	7–11
Winner	2.	1998	Belgian Amateur Championship (2)	(Belgium) Mario Geudens	7–3
Runner-up	2.	1999	Belgian Amateur Championship	(Belgium) Mario Geudens	5–7
Winner	3.	1999	EBSA European Snooker Championship	(Wales) David Bell	7–0
Winner	4.	2000	Belgian Amateur Championship (3)	(Belgium) Alain De Cock	7–1
Runner-up	3.	2000	EBSA European Snooker Championship	(England) Craig Butler	3–7
Winner	5.	2001	Belgian Amateur Championship (4)	(Belgium) Mario Geudens	7–3
Winner	6.	2001	EBSA European Snooker Championship (2)	(England) Kurt Maflin	7–6
Winner	7.	2005	Belgian Amateur Championship (5)	(Belgium) Nico Devlies	7–4
Winner	8.	2007	Belgian Amateur Championship (6)	(Belgium) Patrick Delsemme	7–6
Winner	9.	2007	PIOS – Event 7	(England) Craig Steadman	6–2
Winner	10.	2008	PIOS – Event 1	(England) Andrew Atkinson	6–2
Runner-up	4.	2010	Belgian Amateur Championship (2)	(Belgium) Luca Brecel	4–7
Runner-up	5.	2011	Belgian Amateur Championship (3)	(Belgium) Peter Bullen	3–7
