= Luca Brecel =

Belgian professional snooker player

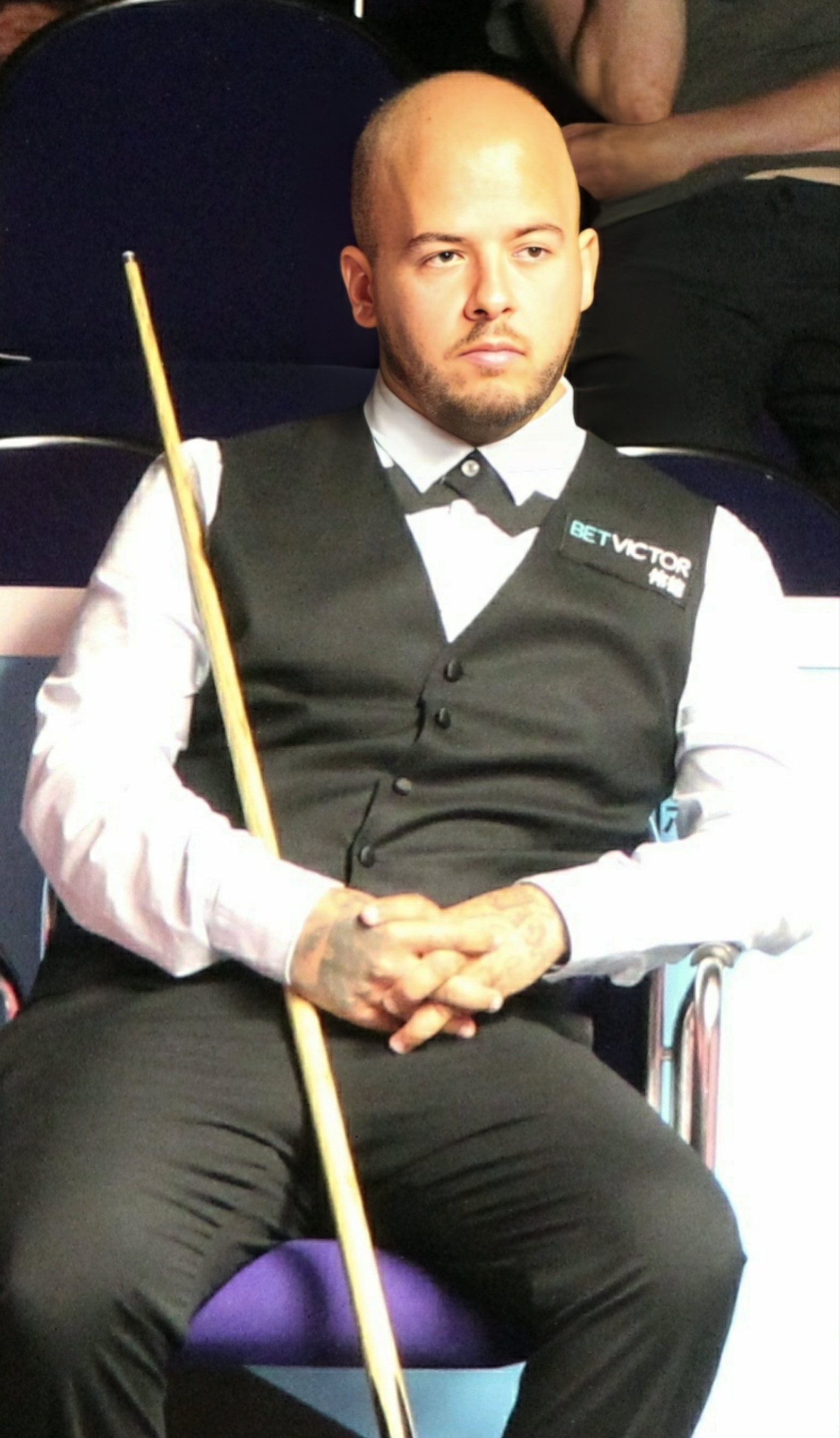
- Brecel in 2022

Personal information
- Nickname: The Belgian Bullet
- Born: 8 March 1995 (age 31) Dilsen-Stokkem, Belgium

Sport
- Country: Belgium
- Sport: Snooker
- Professional: 2011–present
- Highest ranking: 2 (May 2023)
- Current ranking: 39 (as of 7 November 2026)
- Maximum breaks: 1
- Century breaks: 234 (as of 19 November 2026)

Tournament wins
- Ranking: 4
- World Championship: 2023

Luca Brecel (Dutch pronunciation: [ˈlukaː breːˈsɛl]; born 8 March 1995) is a Belgian professional snooker player. A four-time ranking event winner, Brecel is a former World Snooker Champion, having won the 2023 event by defeating four-time champion Mark Selby in the final. Brecel trailed Si Jiahui 5–14 in the semi-final, but recovered to win 17–15. This comeback from nine frames behind is the biggest deficit ever overturned in the history of the World Championship at the Crucible Theatre. He became the first player from mainland Europe to win the World Championship.

He was also the first player from mainland Europe to win a ranking event when he won the 2017 China Championship, and then went on to win other ranking events: the 2021 Scottish Open and 2022 Championship League. He is the youngest player to compete in the World Snooker Championship making his debut in 2012, aged 17 years and 45 days losing to Stephen Maguire in the first round.

Brecel won the 2009 European Under-19 title at the age of 14, and turned professional in 2011. He reached the top 16 in the world rankings in 2017, and reached his first Triple Crown final at the 2021 UK Championship, but lost 5–10 to Zhao Xintong. A week later, he defeated John Higgins 9–5 to win the 2021 Scottish Open.

Since winning his world title in 2023, Brecel's form has declined. Withdrawing from multiple events in the subsequent seasons citing physical health reasons and having reached only one ranking event semi-final, his world ranking had fallen to 43 by the end of 2025.

== Early life and amateur career ==
Luca Brecel was born in 1995 in Dilsen-Stokkem, Belgium. His father Carlo was a "hail hunter", following storms to work repairing the damage from them, and his mother Mirella was a homemaker. Brecel began playing snooker when he was nine, having played pool with his father during a family holiday. The family lived in Maasmechelen, where Brecel started receiving coaching from Danny Moermans, and later moved to a property where they installed a snooker table he could use. He began being homeschooled, allowing him more time to practice snooker. He scored his first competitive century break at 12.

In April 2009, Brecel became the youngest European Under-19 champion, at 14 years of age, in a 6–5 victory against Michael Wasley in Saint Petersburg. The victory would have earned him a place on the professional snooker tour, except that the minimum age to join the tour was 16. In the Grand Final of the World Series of Snooker in Portugal in May, Brecel beat six-time World Championship runner-up Jimmy White 4–3 and 1997 world champion Ken Doherty 5–3. He lost 4–5 to 2006 world champion Graeme Dott in the quarter-finals. In August 2009, he beat Joe Perry, then world number 12, at the Paul Hunter Classic. Around this time, Brecel's family relocated to a larger home in Maasmechelen so they could fit a full-size practice table.

In January 2010, Brecel beat seven-time world champion Stephen Hendry 4–1 in an exhibition game in Bruges. In May of that year, Brecel beat professional compatriot Bjorn Haneveer 7–4 to become Belgian senior champion. His break of 136 was the highest of the tournament. Brecel was one of eight players who participated in the new Power Snooker tournament at the indigO2 in October 2010, alongside then reigning world champion Neil Robertson, Ding Junhui, Mark Selby, Ali Carter, Shaun Murphy, Jimmy White, and Ronnie O'Sullivan. Brecel was defeated by eventual winner O'Sullivan in the first round. In December 2010, Brecel was named Belgian Sportsman of the Year in the Promising Talent category.

== Professional career ==
=== Early professional years (2011–2015) ===
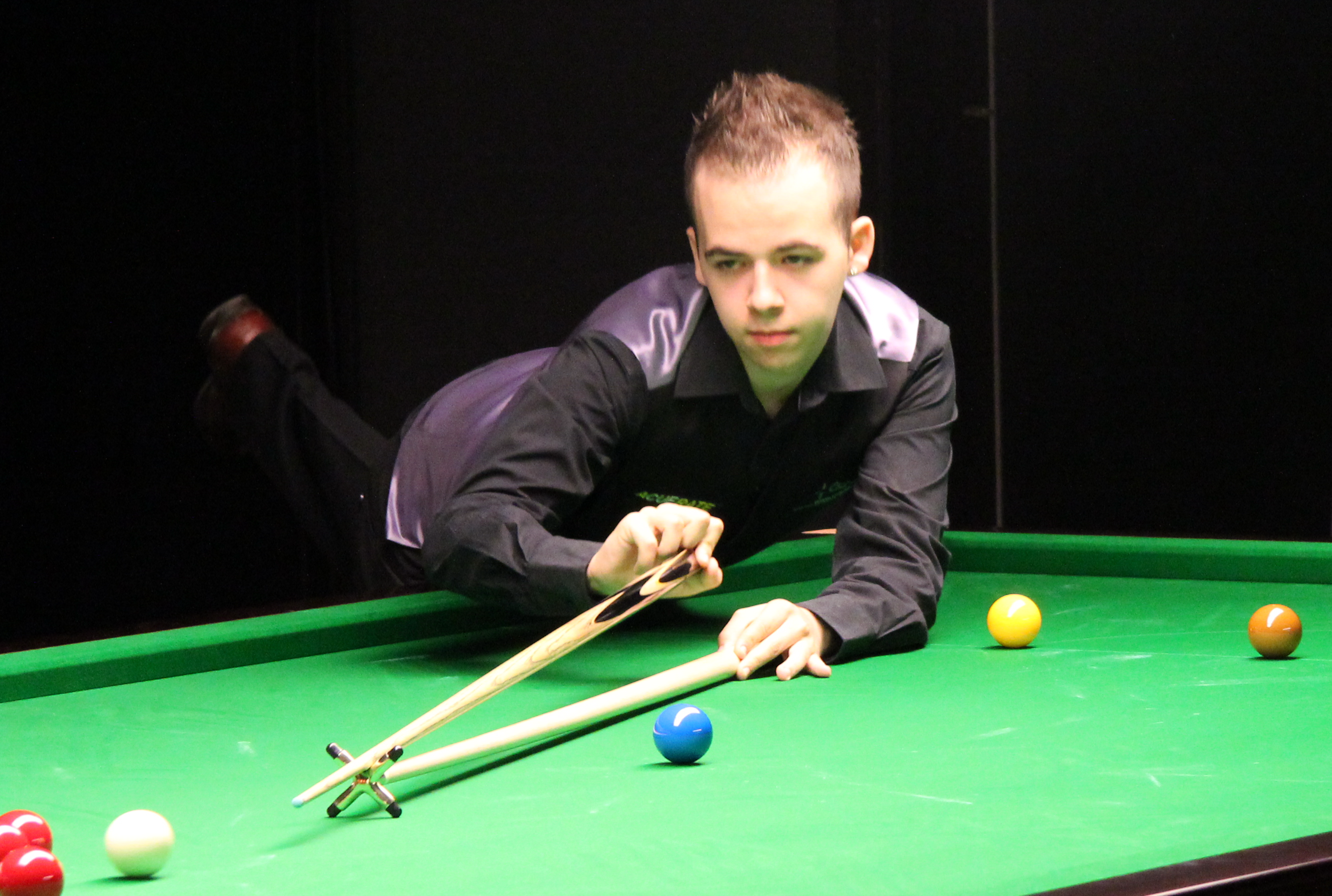
Brecel in 2011

In May 2011, Brecel received a wild card for the main tour of the professional 2011–12 season. Brecel turned professional in the following month, beating Anthony Hamilton in his first official professional match. By August, he was ranked number 87 on the snooker world rankings. In January 2012, Brecel made his first maximum break in an amateur tournament. Brecel played in all 12 of the minor-ranking Players Tour Championship finishing 69th on the Order of Merit.

Aged 17, Brecel became the youngest ever player to qualify for the World Snooker Championship at the 2012 event, after he defeated Ian McCulloch, Barry Pinches, Michael Holt and Mark King to qualify. In doing so he broke the record of Stephen Hendry from 1986, who was almost two months older than Brecel. This was his first ranking event main draw, but he lost 5–10 in the first round against Stephen Maguire.

Although finishing the season outside the top 64 in the world rankings who automatically retain their places on the snooker tour, Brecel received a two-year wildcard, along with Tony Drago. Barry Hearn, the chairman of World Snooker said the decision was made as it would be a "loss to the sport" if Brecel did not feature. Brecel was awarded the Rookie of the Year Award at the World Snooker Annual Award Ceremony.

In July 2012, Brecel made his second maximum break in an amateur tournament. In qualifying for the first ranking event of the season, the 2012 Wuxi Classic, Brecel reached the third qualifying round but lost 5–4 to Jamie Burnett making three century breaks.

At the first PTC event of 2012, Brecel defeated Graeme Dott and Ken Doherty on his way to the last 16, where he met Judd Trump, who beat him 4–1. He finished 51st on the PTC Order of Merit.

Brecel qualified for the 2012 UK Championship after coming through four rounds of qualifying. He beat Scott Donaldson 6–5, Peter Lines 6–4, Liu Chuang 6–3 and Peter Ebdon 6–1, making five century breaks in the process, to reach the main draw of a ranking event for the second time. He won his first match in a ranking event by beating Ricky Walden 6–5 in the first round. He followed this up with a 6–4 win over Mark King, despite trailing 0–3. He was eventually defeated 6–5 in the quarter-final by Shaun Murphy, having missed a pink which would have given him an opportunity to win on the final black in each of the last two frames.

Following this success, Brecel failed to win any other qualifying match for the rest of the season. He was beaten 6–10 by amateur Fraser Patrick in the first round of World Championship qualifying. He ended his second year as a professional ranked world number 72.

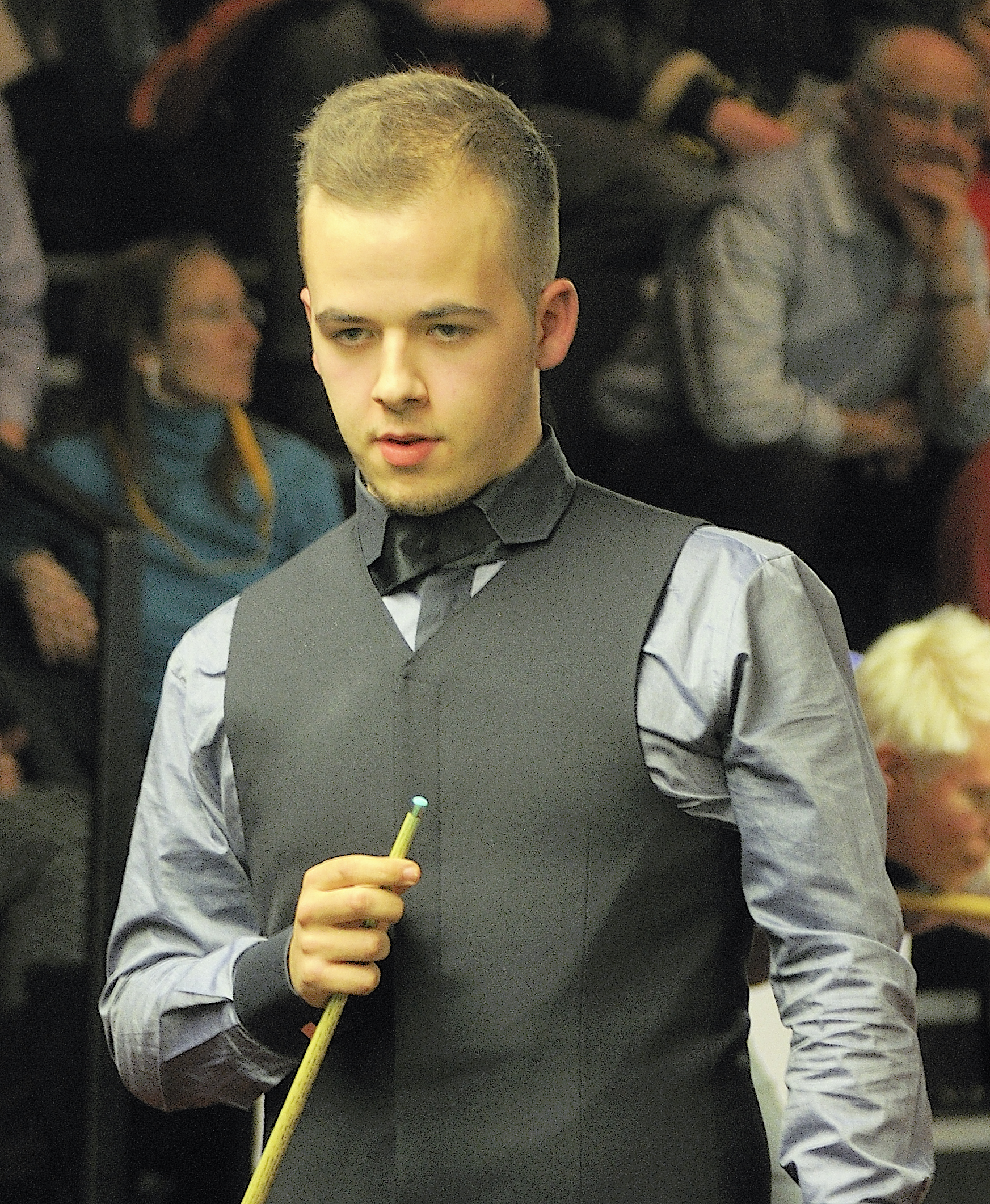
Luca Brecel at the 2014 German Masters

Brecel lost in the qualifying rounds for the first five ranking events of the 2013–14 season, but received automatic entry into the first round of the UK Championship as all 128 players on the tour were admitted. He began the event defeating Mike Dunn 6–4, but then lost 5–6 to Stephen Maguire, despite having held a 5–2 lead. Brecel qualified for the next ranking event, the German Masters, by defeating James Wattana 5–3, but was eliminated by Joe Perry 2–5 in the opening round. His best result of the year came at the penultimate ranking event of the season, the China Open where he reached the second round thanks to the withdrawal of Mark Allen. Brecel then beat Dominic Dale 5–1 in the last 16, but missed out on his second career quarter-final as he lost 2–5 against Graeme Dott. In the minor-ranking European Tour events played throughout the season, Brecel advanced to the quarter-finals of the Ruhr Open by defeating Stuart Bingham 4–1, but was then beaten by Robbie Williams in a deciding frame by 73 points to 72. He finished 39th on the European Order of Merit and inside the top 64 in the world ranking for the first time, at number 63.

The first ranking event Brecel qualified for in the 2014–15 season was the Australian Goldfields Open where he was defeated by Matthew Stevens 3–5 in the opening round. He was whitewashed 0–6 by Mark Allen in the second round of the 2014 UK Championship. At the 2015 Welsh Open he defeated world number 15 Robert Milkins 4–0 in the opening round, Tian Pengfei 4–1 and Oliver Brown 4–0. In the second match he made a break of 140, the highest in his professional career and ultimately the highest in the tournament. He went on to beat reigning world champion and world number one Mark Selby in the fourth round after a deciding frame, 4–3, to reach the quarter-finals. There, Brecel met Ricky Walden, ranked number 9 at the time. Brecel lost the first three frames, but won the next five, to reach the first ranking semi-final of his professional career. In the semi-final, he lost to John Higgins 4–6. A pair of quarter-final exits in the European Tour events saw Brecel finish 16th on the Order of Merit, to make his debut in the Grand Final, where he lost 0–4 to Judd Trump in the opening round. Brecel moved up 19 places in the rankings to finish 44th in the world.

=== First ranking event win (2015–2019) ===
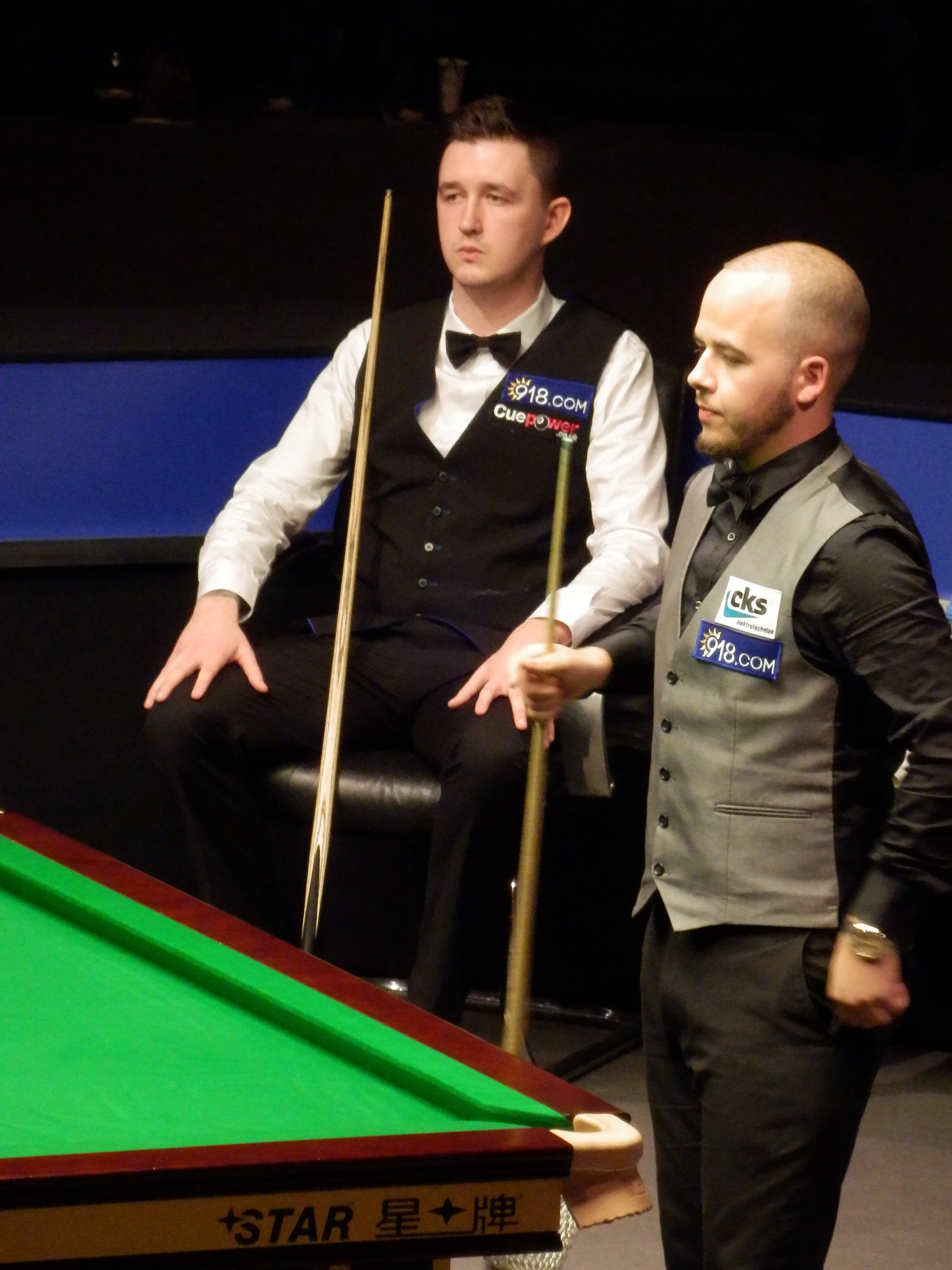
Brecel (right) playing Kyren Wilson at the 2016 German Masters.

After failing to qualify for the 2015 Australian Goldfields Open and exiting both the 2015 Shanghai Masters and 2015 International Championship in the first round, Brecel then beat Hossein Vafaei 6–1, Anthony McGill 6–4 and Robin Hull 6–2 to reach the fourth round of the 2015 UK Championship. He subsequently lost to Matthew Selt 4–6 after being 3–1 up in the interval. After beating Zhao Xintong 5–2 and Kurt Maflin 5–3 he reached his first quarter-final of the season soon afterwards at the German Masters, where he recovered from 2–4 down to defeat Mark Joyce 5–4, closing the match with a 102 break. Brecel then won a scrappy game 6–3 in the semi-finals against Kyren Wilson to become only the second European player from outside the UK and Ireland, after Tony Drago, to play in a ranking event final, and the first from Belgium. In the final, Brecel lost 9–5 to Martin Gould, but targeted a top 20 world ranking before the end of the season. He lost in the final of the 2016 Snooker Shoot-Out to Robin Hull. Brecel was beaten in the fourth round of the 2016 Welsh Open (snooker) 2–4 by Ding Junhui and, after losing in the first round of three successive ranking events and failing to qualify for the 2016 World Snooker Championship, he finished the year at 30th in the world, at the time the highest he finished a campaign.

Brecel did not get past the first round of any of the first seven ranking events he entered in the 2016–17 season, before he restricted Shaun Murphy to eight points and defeated him 4–0 in the opening round of the Northern Ireland Open. He then beat Jamie Cope 4–2, before losing 1–4 to Michael White. At the UK Championship, Brecel whitewashed Aditya Mehta 6–0 and then overcame Sam Craigie 6–5, Yu Delu 6–1 and Stephen Maguire 6–3 to play Murphy in the quarter-finals of the event for the second time. Murphy won the quarter-final 6–1. Brecel qualified for the World Championship for the second time at the 2017 World Snooker Championship and raced in to a 7–1 lead over Marco Fu in the first round, before losing 9–10.

Brecel won his first ranking title, the 2017 China Championship in August 2017. He defeated Jimmy Robertson, Marco Fu, and Mike Dunn, before defeating Ronnie O'Sullivan 5–4 in the quarter-finals after being 1–4 down. He then defeated Li Hang 6–5 in the semi-finals, before defeating Shaun Murphy 10–5 in the final. His victory propelled him into the top 16 of the rankings for the first time. A month later, at the World Open, Brecel confirmed his status as a top 16 player with a semi-final finish, winning three consecutive rounds in deciding frames, before losing to eventual winner Ding Junhui 6–4.

Having won the China Championship, Brecel was invited to the 2017 Champion of Champions invitational tournament. He completed a whitewash of Judd Trump 4–0 in the first round and defeated reigning world champion Mark Selby 6–4. In the semi-final, he suffered a 6–4 defeat to Shaun Murphy, who went on to win the tournament.

At the 2018 Northern Ireland Open, Brecel lost in the last 16 to the eventual winner Judd Trump. He also reached the last 16 in the 2019 Snooker Shoot Out and the semi-finals of the non-ranking 2018 Six-red World Championship and the 2019 China Open. At the 2019 World Snooker Championship, he lost 10–9 in the first round to Gary Wilson, with the deciding frame lasting a record 79 minutes. He finished this season again as world number 19.

=== Ranking titles and world champion (2020–present) ===
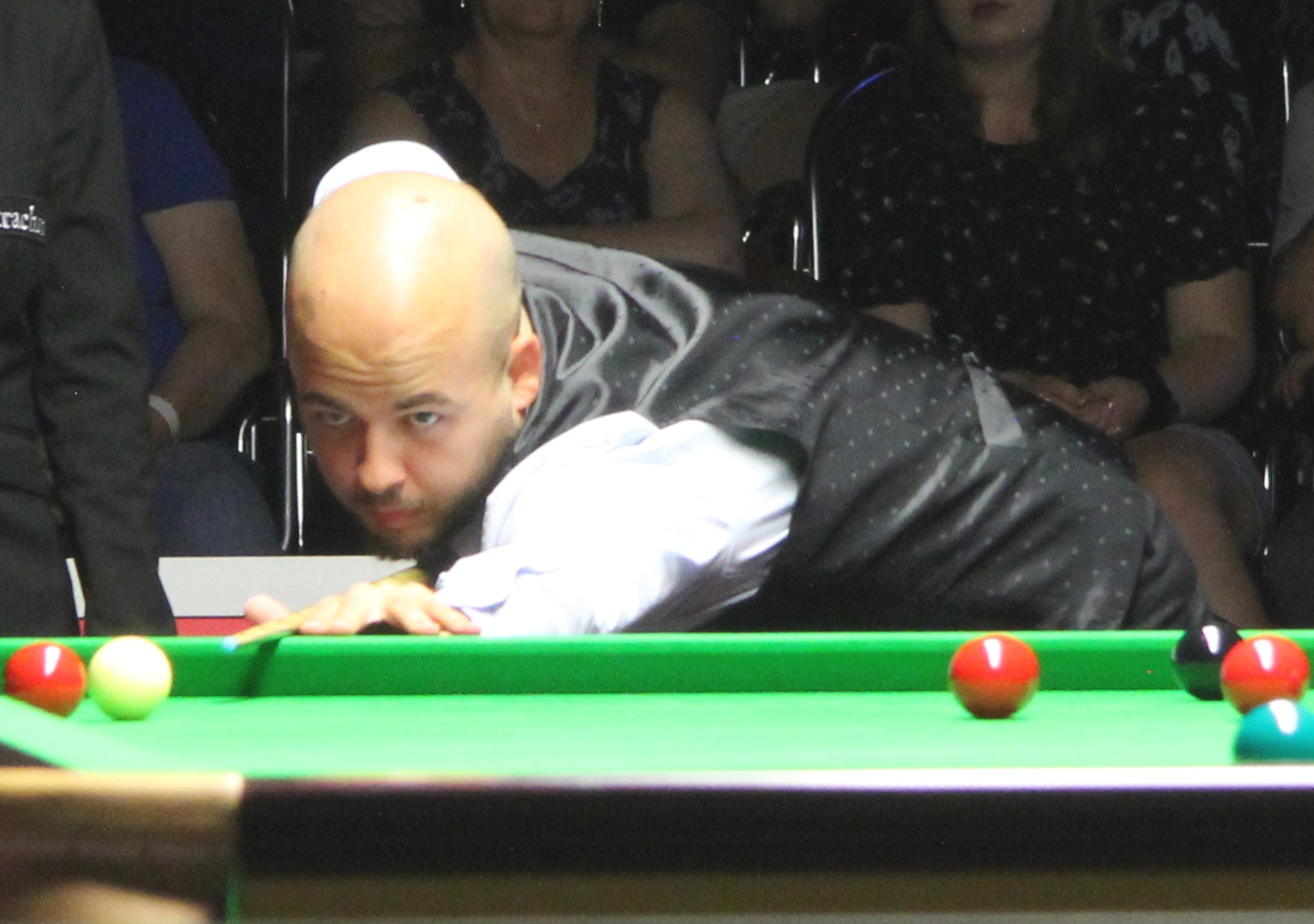
Brecel at the 2022 European Masters

Brecel's best result in a ranking tournament in the 2019-20 snooker season was an appearance in the last 16 of the Welsh Open, in which he lost 4–3 to John Higgins. During this season he dropped out of the top 32. In June 2020, he won the non-ranking Championship League, beating Stuart Bingham in the final group and drawing against Ryan Day and Ben Woollaston.

Brecel reached the quarter-finals of the 2021 English Open in which he lost 5–1 to Ronnie O'Sullivan. Brecel reached the final of the 2021 UK Championship. This made him the first player from continental Europe to appear in the final of a Triple Crown event. On his way to the final, Brecel completed a whitewash of Stephen Maguire and beat Kyren Wilson 6–4 in the semi-final, with four centuries during the match. In the final he lost 10–5 to Zhao Xintong. As runner-up, Brecel moved up the world rankings from 40th to 18th. In the following week he won his second ranking event, the Scottish Open. He defeated Higgins in the final 9‍–‍5.

During the 2022–23 season, Brecel won his third ranking title at the 2022 Championship League, and also made it to the final of the 2022 English Open.

At the 2023 World Snooker Championship, he was finally able to win his first match at the tournament, after five failed attempts. In the last-sixteen stage, he defeated three-time winner Mark Williams. In his quarter-final match, he faced the defending champion Ronnie O'Sullivan. He trailed O'Sullivan 6–10 after the first two sessions, but won all seven frames played in the final session to win the match 13–10. O'Sullivan subsequently said he would like to see Brecel go on to win the tournament. In the semi-final he trailed Si Jiahui 5–14 early in the third session, before Brecel won eleven consecutive frames to take a 16–14 lead, and won the match 17–15. In the final, he faced four-time champion Mark Selby. Brecel took a 6–2 lead after the first session, before having his lead cut to 9–8 in the second. He then won six of the eight frames in the third session to lead 15–10. In the fourth session, Selby reduced the deficit to 16–15, but Brecel won the next two frames to win the match 18–15. In winning the World Championship, Brecel was the first player from continental Europe to do so, and the first player not from Australia, Canada, Ireland or the United Kingdom to win the championship.

He did not have great success in the 2023–2024 season: his best ranking-tournament result being a quarter-final in the Welsh Open, and only twice otherwise did he reach the last 16 of a ranking tournament. He fared better in two non-ranking tournaments, reaching the final of the Shanghai Masters, and the inaugural World Masters of Snooker in Riyadh, losing to O'Sullivan in both occasions: but went on to lose in the first round at the Crucible against qualifier David Gilbert, losing four frames in a row from a 9–6 lead to lose the match 10–9.

== Style of play ==
Brecel's style of play has been described as "very aggressive, very attacking" and "all-out attacking". His swashbuckling and flamboyant style of play has received praise and drawn comparisons with Alex Higgins and Ronnie O'Sullivan.

== Performance and rankings timeline ==
Tournament	2008/ 09	2010/ 11	2011/ 12	2012/ 13	2013/ 14	2014/ 15	2015/ 16	2016/ 17	2017/ 18	2018/ 19	2019/ 20		2020/ 21	2021/ 22	2022/ 23	2023/ 24	2024/ 25	2025/ 26	2026/ 27
Ranking (Note: It shows the ranking at the beginning of the season)	(Note: He was an amateur)		(Note: New players on the Main Tour do not have a ranking)	(Note: Players qualified through European nomination started the season without ranking points)	72	63	44	30	27	15	15		38	39	12	2	4	39	44
Ranking tournaments
Championship League	Non-Ranking Event												RR	RR	W	A	A	WD	2R
China Open	A	A	LQ	LQ	3R	LQ	1R	LQ	1R	SF	Tournament Not Held								LQ
Wuhan Open	Tournament Not Held															WD	LQ	WD	LQ
British Open	Tournament Not Held													3R	LQ	LQ	3R	WD	LQ
English Open	Tournament Not Held							1R	2R	2R	1R		2R	QF	F	3R	2R	QF	LQ
Shenzhen Open (Note: The event was called the Xi'an Grand Prix (2024/2025–2025/2026))	Tournament Not Held																WD	WD	LQ
Northern Ireland Open	Tournament Not Held							3R	WD	4R	3R		3R	2R	3R	A	2R	1R	2R
International Championship	Not Held			LQ	LQ	LQ	1R	1R	2R	LQ	2R		Not Held			1R	LQ	LQ	WD
UK Championship	A	A	LQ	QF	2R	2R	4R	QF	3R	3R	1R		2R	F	2R	2R	1R	LQ	
Shoot Out	Non-Ranking Event							3R	3R	4R	1R		1R	2R	1R	A	A	3R	
Scottish Open	Not Held			MR	Not Held			1R	A	3R	1R		2R	W	LQ	2R	QF	WD	
German Masters	NH	WR	LQ	LQ	1R	LQ	F	LQ	LQ	LQ	2R		2R	2R	2R	LQ	2R	LQ	
Welsh Open	A	A	LQ	LQ	1R	SF	4R	1R	2R	1R	4R		1R	LQ	3R	QF	SF	1R	
World Grand Prix	Tournament Not Held					NR	1R	DNQ	1R	DNQ	DNQ		DNQ	2R	2R	DNQ	DNQ	DNQ	
Players Championship (Note: The event was called the Players Tour Championship Grand Final (2010/2011–2015/2016))	NH	DNQ	DNQ	DNQ	DNQ	1R	1R	DNQ	1R	DNQ	DNQ		DNQ	1R	QF	DNQ	DNQ	DNQ	
World Open (Note: The event was called the Grand Prix (2008/2009))	A	LQ	LQ	LQ	LQ	Not Held		1R	SF	2R	1R		Not Held			2R	WD	2R	
Tour Championship	Tournament Not Held									DNQ	DNQ		DNQ	SF	DNQ	DNQ	DNQ	DNQ	
World Championship	A	A	1R	LQ	LQ	LQ	LQ	1R	1R	1R	LQ		LQ	1R	W	1R	QF	LQ	
Non-ranking tournaments
Shanghai Masters	Ranking Event									1R	A		Not Held			F	2R	A	A
Champion of Champions	Tournament Not Held				A	A	A	A	SF	1R	A		1R	A	1R	1R	1R	A	
Riyadh Season Championship (Note: The event was called the World Masters of Snooker (2023/2024))	Tournament Not Held															F	F	A	
The Masters	A	A	A	A	A	A	A	A	1R	QF	A		A	A	1R	1R	QF	A	
Championship League	A	A	A	A	A	A	A	A	RR	WD	RR	W	A	A	WD	A	A	A	
Former ranking tournaments
Wuxi Classic (Note: The event was called the Jiangsu Classic (2008/2009))	NH	Non-Ranking		LQ	LQ	LQ	Tournament Not Held												
Australian Goldfields Open	Not Held		LQ	LQ	LQ	1R	LQ	Tournament Not Held											
Shanghai Masters	A	A	LQ	LQ	LQ	LQ	1R	LQ	QF	Non-Ranking			Not Held			Non-Ranking Event			
Paul Hunter Classic	PA	Minor-Ranking Event						1R	2R	3R	NR		Tournament Not Held						
Indian Open	Tournament Not Held				LQ	2R	NH	WD	1R	3R	Tournament Not Held								
Riga Masters (Note: The event was called the Riga Open (2014/2015–2015/2016))	Tournament Not Held					Minor-Ranking		1R	2R	1R	1R		Tournament Not Held						
China Championship	Tournament Not Held							NR	W	1R	3R		Tournament Not Held						
WST Pro Series	Tournament Not Held												2R	Tournament Not Held					
Turkish Masters	Tournament Not Held													2R	Tournament Not Held				
Gibraltar Open	Tournament Not Held						MR	3R	1R	1R	3R		2R	3R	Tournament Not Held				
WST Classic	Tournament Not Held														1R	Tournament Not Held			
European Masters	Tournament Not Held							1R	3R	3R	1R		3R	2R	1R	3R	Not Held		
Saudi Arabia Masters	Tournament Not Held																5R	WD	NH
Former non-ranking tournaments
World Series Grand Final	QF	Tournament Not Held																	
Power Snooker	NH	QF	A	Tournament Not Held															
World Grand Prix	Tournament Not Held					1R	Ranking Event												
Shoot Out	NH	A	A	A	1R	2R	F	Ranking Event											
Romanian Masters	Tournament Not Held								1R	Tournament Not Held									
Paul Hunter Classic	PA	Minor-Ranking Event						Ranking Event			SF		Tournament Not Held						
Six-red World Championship (Note: The event was called the Six-red Snooker International (2008/2009))	A	A	NH	A	A	A	A	QF	WD	SF	RR		Not Held		WD	Tournament Not Held			

Performance Table Legend
LQ	lost in the qualifying draw	#R	lost in the early rounds of the tournament (WR = Wildcard round, RR = Round robin)	QF	lost in the quarter-finals
SF	lost in the semi-finals	F	lost in the final	W	won the tournament
DNQ	did not qualify for the tournament	A	did not participate in the tournament	WD	withdrew from the tournament

NH / Not Held	means an event was not held.
NR / Non-Ranking Event	means an event is/was no longer a ranking event.
R / Ranking Event	means an event is/was a ranking event.
MR / Minor-Ranking Event	means an event is/was a minor-ranking event.
PA / Pro-am Event	means an event is/was a pro-am event.

== Career finals ==
=== Ranking finals: 7 (4 titles) ===
Legend
World Championship (1–0)
UK Championship (0–1)
Other (3–2)

Outcome	No.	Year	Championship	Opponent in the final	Score	Ref.
Runner-up	1.	2016	German Masters	Martin Gould (ENG)	5–9	
Winner	1.	2017	China Championship	Shaun Murphy (ENG)	10–5	
Runner-up	2.	2021	UK Championship	Zhao Xintong (CHN)	5–10	
Winner	2.	2021	Scottish Open	John Higgins (SCO)	9–5	
Winner	3.	2022	Championship League	Lu Ning (CHN)	3–1	
Runner-up	3.	2022	English Open	Mark Selby (ENG)	6–9	
Winner	4.	2023	World Snooker Championship	Mark Selby (ENG)	18–15	

=== Non-ranking finals: 5 (1 title) ===
Outcome	No.	Year	Championship	Opponent in the final	Score	Ref.
Runner-up	1.	2016	Snooker Shoot Out	Robin Hull (FIN)	0–1	
Winner	1.	2020	Championship League Invitational	Ben Woollaston (ENG)	Round-Robin	
Runner-up	2.	2023	Shanghai Masters	Ronnie O'Sullivan (ENG)	9–11	
Runner-up	3.	2024	World Masters of Snooker	Ronnie O'Sullivan (ENG)	2–5	
Runner-up	4.	2024	Riyadh Season Snooker Championship	Mark Allen (NIR)	1–5	

=== Pro-am finals: 6 (5 titles) ===
Outcome	No.	Year	Championship	Opponent in the final	Score	Ref.
Winner	1.	2013	Dutch Open	Bjorn Haneveer (BEL)	5–3	
Winner	2.	2014	3 Kings Open	Tony Drago (MLT)	5–4	
Runner-up	1.	2015	3 Kings Open	Tony Drago (MLT)	4–5	
Winner	3.	2018	Golden Q Cup	Michael Georgiou (CYP)	5–1	
Winner	4.	2020	3 Kings Open (2)	Alexander Ursenbacher (SUI)	5–2	
Winner	5.	2020	Italian Snooker Open	Sybren Sokolowski (BEL)	4–1	

=== Team finals (1 title) ===
Outcome	No.	Year	Championship	Team/partner	Opponent in the final	Score	Ref.
Winner	1.	2024	World Mixed Doubles	Reanne Evans (ENG)	Mark Selby (ENG); Rebecca Kenna (ENG)	4–2	

=== Amateur titles ===
Outcome	No.	Year	Championship	Opponent in the final	Score	Ref.
Winner	1.	2007	Belgian Under-16 Championship	Jurian Heusdens (BEL)	4–2	
Winner	2.	2008	Belgian Under-16 Championship	Glenn Dossche (BEL)	4–0	
Winner	3.	2009	Belgian Under-16 Championship	Kenny Saynave (BEL)	4–0	
Winner	4.	2010	Belgian Under-16 Championship	Glenn Dossche (BEL)	4–0	
Winner	5.	2009	European Under-19 Championship	Michael Wasley (ENG)	6–5	
Winner	6.	2010	Belgian Amateur Championship	Bjorn Haneveer (BEL)	7–4	
Winner	7.	2010	European Amateur Championship	Roy Stolk (NED)	7–4	
Winner	8.	2013	Belgian Amateur Championship	Yvan Van Velthoven (BEL)	7–1	
Winner	9.	2014	Belgian Amateur Championship	Yvan Van Velthoven (BEL)	7–5	
