= Kevin Van Hove =

Belgian snooker player

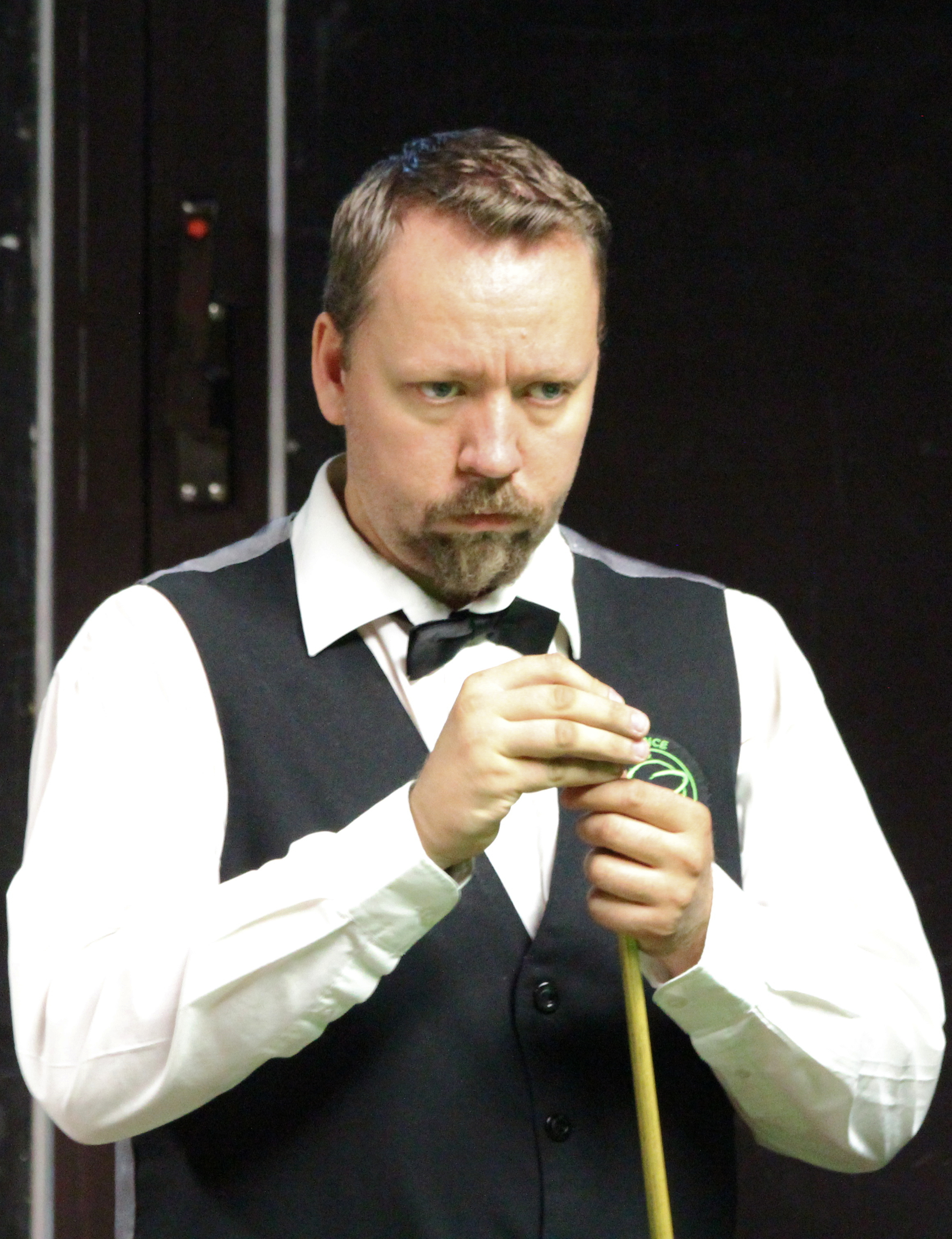
- Paul Hunter Classic 2018

Personal information
- Born: 15 October 1983 (age 43) Merksem, Belgium

Sport
- Country: Belgium
- Sport: Snooker
- Professional: 2007/2008
- Highest ranking: 95 (2007–08)

Kevin Van Hove-Speltincx (born 15 October 1983) is a Belgium former professional snooker player. He is the former European Snooker Champion.

== Career ==
In 2004, Van Hove entered the Belgian Amateur Championship, defeating Jim Spapen 7–1 in the final to win the championship for the first time.

In 2007 at the EBSA European Snooker Championship, he managed to advance to the final in which he defeated Rodney Goggins 7–2. He then also prevailed at the EBSA International Play-Off and secured a place on the Main Tour for the 2007/2008 snooker season. However he only recorded two victories over Kurt Maflin and Drew Henry, and returned to amateur status at the end of the season.

== Performance and rankings timeline ==
Tournament	2004/ 05	2007/ 08	2018/ 19
Ranking (Note: It shows the ranking at the beginning of the season.)	(Note: He was an amateur.)	(Note: New players on the Main Tour don't have a ranking.)	
Ranking tournaments
Riga Masters	Not Held		A
World Open (Note: The event was called the Grand Prix (2004/2005 and 2007/2008))	A	LQ	A
Paul Hunter Classic (Note: The event was called the Grand Prix Fürth (2004/2005))	Pro-Am		1R
Indian Open	Not Held		A
China Championship	Not Held		A
European Masters	Not Held		A
English Open	Not Held		A
International Championship	Not Held		A
Northern Ireland Open	Not Held		A
UK Championship	A	LQ	A
Scottish Open	Not Held		A
German Masters	Not Held		A
World Grand Prix	Not Held		DNQ
Welsh Open	A	LQ	A
Shoot-Out	Not Held		A
Players Championship	Not Held		DNQ
Gibraltar Open	Not Held		1R
Tour Championship	Not Held		DNQ
China Open	A	LQ	A
World Championship	LQ	LQ	A
Former ranking tournaments
Northern Ireland Trophy	NH	LQ	NH
Shanghai Masters	NH	LQ	NR

Performance Table Legend
LQ	lost in the qualifying draw	#R	lost in the early rounds of the tournament (WR = Wildcard round, RR = Round robin)	QF	lost in the quarter-finals
SF	lost in the semi-finals	F	lost in the final	W	won the tournament
DNQ	did not qualify for the tournament	A	did not participate in the tournament	WD	withdrew from the tournament

NH / Not Held	means an event was not held.
NR / Non-Ranking Event	means an event is/was no longer a ranking event.
R / Ranking Event	means an event is/was a ranking event.
MR / Minor-Ranking Event	means an event is/was a minor-ranking event.

== Career finals ==
=== Amateur finals: 8 (4 titles) ===
Outcome	No.	Year	Championship	Opponent in the final	Score
Winner	1.	2004	Belgian Amateur Championship	(Belgium) Jim Spapen	7–1
Winner	2.	2007	EBSA Euro Play-Offs	(Israel) Roey Fernandez	4–1
Winner	3.	2007	EBSA European Snooker Championship	(Republic of Ireland) Rodney Goggins	7–2
Runner-up	1.	2008	Belgian Amateur Championship	(Belgium) Danny Lathouwers	2–7
Runner-up	2.	2009	Belgian Amateur Championship (2)	(Belgium) Mario Geudens	3–7
Runner-up	3.	2012	Belgian Amateur Championship (3)	(Belgium) Yvan Van Velthoven	6–7
Runner-up	4.	2017	Belgian Amateur Championship (4)	(Belgium) Jeff Jacobs	4–7
Winner	4.	2018	Belgian Amateur Championship (2)	(Belgium) Julien Leclercq	7–5
