= John Whitty (snooker player) =

English snooker player

Personal information
- Born: 7 November 1977 (age 48) Liverpool, England

Sport
- Country: England
- Sport: Snooker
- Professional: 1995–1997, 1998–2000
- Highest ranking: 118 (1998/1999)

John Whitty (born 7 November 1977) is an English former professional snooker player.

== Career ==
John Whitty began his snooker career in the 1995–96 snooker season, when the professional tour was still open to all players. In his first tournament, the Thailand Classic, he survived three qualifying rounds. In the Grand Prix he beat, among others, Hugh Abernethy, Steve Judd and Jamie Woodman. He reached the round of the last 96th. At the World Cup, he made it to the best of 19 laps, losing 6–10 to Barry Pinches. The following year, although he reached higher qualifying rounds, under the last 128 but he did not compete at any tournament. He did not get beyond rank 222 in the world ranking list.

In the 1997–98 snooker season, the field of players was split into Main Tour and UK Tour. He had to go to the WPBSA Qualifying School. His best result was the group semifinals in the fourth tournament, which was not enough. Instead of big tournaments, he played UK Tour tournaments this year. His best result was the quarterfinals in tournament 4. In 1998/99 he returned to the Main Tour and had his greatest success in the UK Championship. He defeated Darren Clarke and top-64 player Nick Pearce, reaching the main tournament in Bournemouth. There he lost the first round match against Andy Hicks 6–9. At the China International, he reached the round of 96 and two more times the 134. This brought him to number 118 in the world rankings. With that he fell back on the UK tour and after another year lost his professional status.

He gave up the Challenge Tour to re-qualification in 2000 after a defeat. In 2001–02 snooker season he played all four tournaments, but once the 32 round was his best result. In the Benson & Hedges Championship, a professional tournament open to amateurs, he reached the round of 32. He starred in the British Amateur Championship, where he lost the final of the southern group. The Challenge Tour 2002/03 was not better than the year before and in 2003–04 snooker season he won only twice in the 4 tournaments. Then he gave up his professional ambitions.

In 2010 he played as an amateur again at the English championship. This time he defeated Jeff Cundy with 8–7 in the regional final and then lost the final against Leo Fernandez, 6–10. He took part again in the new year, reaching the Main Tour Players Tour Championship (PTC) and entered two tournaments in Sheffield, the main professional round. He managed to qualify for the World Open 2010. All games were against professional players, but he lost. Only the following year he defeated the Welshman Dominic Dale at the second PTC tournament and moved into the round of 64. In 2012–13 snooker season he was twice in a PTC main tournament, at the Munich Open 2013, for the first time outside England. In the same year, Whitty got an invitation to the 6-Red World Championship. With only 2 wins from 5 games, he survived the group stage and lost in the round of 32 against Robert Milkins. It was his final main tour appearance.

In 2012 he played for the first time Amateur Europe Championship and reached the round of 32. The following year he made it to the semifinals, where he lost to Robin Hull. In 2014 he reached the final, but Mitchell Mann denied him the title with a 2–7 defeat. In 2015, he made it again among the 32. At the Amateur World Championship he competed twice, once he was there in the last 32nd

John Whitty is a friend and training partner of Rod Lawler.
