= Players Tour Championship 2011/2012 – Event 4 =

Players Tour Championship 2011/2012 Event 4
Tournament information
- Dates: 25–28 August 2011
- Venue: Stadthalle
- City: Fürth
- Country: Germany
- Organisation: World Snooker
- Format: Minor-ranking event
- Total prize fund: €52,260
- Winner's share: €10,000
- Highest break: Ronnie O'Sullivan (ENG) (147)

Final
- Champion: Mark Selby (ENG)
- Runner-up: Mark Davis (ENG)
- Score: 4–0

The Players Tour Championship 2011/2012 – Event 4 (also known as the 2011 Paul Hunter Classic) was a professional minor-ranking snooker tournament that took place between 25 and 28 August 2011 in Fürth, Germany. Some of the preliminary round matches were held in Nürnberg. It was the first PTC event outside of the Grand Finals to be broadcast on television, as one table was screened on Eurosport.

Ronnie O'Sullivan made the 78th official maximum break during his last 32 match against Adam Duffy. This was O'Sullivan's 11th record 147 break.

Judd Trump was the defending champion, but he lost 3–4 in the last 32 against Andrew Higginson.

Mark Selby won in the final 4–0 against Mark Davis.

== Prize fund and ranking points ==
The breakdown of prize money and ranking points of the event is shown below:

	Prize fund	Ranking points^{1}
Winner	€10,000	2,000
Runner-up	€5,000	1,600
Semi-finalist	€2,500	1,280
Quarter-finalist	€1,500	1,000
Last 16	€1,000	760
Last 32	€600	560
Last 64	€200	360
Maximum break	€2,260	–
Total	€52,260	–

- ^{1} Only professional players can earn ranking points.

== Main draw ==
=== Preliminary rounds ===
==== Round 1 ====
Best of 7 frames

(Germany) Hendrik Henschke	2–4	(Germany) Roland Hanisch
(China) Chen Zhe	4–0	(Germany) Norbert Eckstein
(Germany) Norbert Hofheinz	4–2	(Germany) Stephanus Klitzke
(Germany) Hendrik Glax	0–4	(Turkey) Soner Sari
(England) Christopher Henry	4–0	(Germany) Andreas Hartung
(Wales) Stephen Ellis	3–4	(New Zealand) Chris McBreen
(Austria) Baghi Ebrahim	4–1	(Germany) Pavel Leyk
(England) Reanne Evans	1–4	(Germany) Phil Barnes
(Pakistan) Sharam Changezi	w/d–w/o	(Germany) Julian Treiber
(England) Allan Taylor	4–0	(Germany) Dirk Hochheim

(England) Ben Harrison	4–0	(Netherlands) Laurin Winters
(Germany) Julian Gärtner	4–0	(Germany) Bernd Strnad
(Germany) Thomas Cesal	1–4	(Croatia) Sanjin Kusan
(Republic of Ireland) Douglas Hogan	4–2	(England) James Cahill
(Germany) Thomas Valentin	4–0	(Germany) Oliver Metzger
(Germany) Wilhelm Braunwald	1–4	(Germany) Jörg Petersen
(Wales) Alex Taubman	2–4	(England) Ian Glover
(Germany) Ronny Buchholz	1–4	(England) Zen Beechey
(England) David Gray	w/d–w/o	(Germany) Mirko Groß
(Germany) Diana Schuler	0–4	(England) Kyren Wilson

==== Round 2 ====
Best of 7 frames

(Germany) Stefan Gerst	4–3	(Germany) Roland Hanisch
(England) Sanderson Lam	4–2	(England) Shane Castle
(England) Liam Monk	4–0	(Germany) Ralf Günzel
(England) Michael Wasley	4–0	(Austria) Paul Schopf
(Serbia) Zafir Dilji	0–4	(China) Chen Zhe
(Germany) Christian Pesch	0–4	(Germany) Norbert Hofheinz
(Netherlands) Gerrit bij de Leij	4–2	(Turkey) Soner Sari
(Sri Lanka) Naresh Samarawickrama	0–4	(England) Steve Judd
(England) Ricky Norris	2–4	(England) Lee Page
(Netherlands) Ron Florax	1–4	(Austria) Andreas Ploner
(Germany) Ole Steiner	0–4	(England) Christopher Henry
(Wales) Kishan Hirani	4–1	(New Zealand) Chris McBreen
(England) Chris Norbury	4–0	(Austria) Baghi Ebrahim
(Germany) Jörg Schneidewindt	w/d–w/o	(Germany) Rüdiger Fehrmann
(Belgium) Tomasz Skalski	3–4	(Germany) Phil Barnes
(England) Tony Knowles	w/d–w/o	(Germany) Lasse Münstermann
(Germany) Klaus Wuscher	1–4	(Belgium) Hans Blanckaert
(Germany) Gerhard Engelschalk	w/o–w/d	(England) Charlie Walters
(Germany) Ronni Beniesch	2–4	(Germany) Julian Treiber
(Germany) Stefan Joachim	w/o–w/d	(England) Andrew Milliard
(Turkey) Özyurt Aksoy	1–4	(England) Allan Taylor
(Austria) Felix Pleschek	0–4	(England) Ben Harrison
(Germany) Michael Betzinger	w/o–w/d	(England) Robert Valiant
(England) Mitchell Travis	4–0	(Netherlands) Mario Wehrmann
(Wales) Gareth Allen	4–1	(Germany) Julian Gärtner
(England) Mitchell Mann	2–4	(Republic of Ireland) Joe Delaney
(England) Sean O'Sullivan	4–1	(England) Oliver Brown
(Austria) Markus Pfistermüller	1–4	(Austria) Markus Stocker
(Switzerland) Alexander Ursenbacher	4–2	(Croatia) Sanjin Kusan
(England) Sam Harvey	4–0	(Germany) Jan Leichs
(England) Andy Lee	0–4	(Germany) Andreas Pesch
(England) Phil O’Kane	4–0	(Germany) Stefan Merkel

(England) Brian Cox	4–0	(Germany) Harald Kloss
(Germany) Anja Vucicevic	3–4	(Germany) Oliver Kremp
(England) Craig Steadman	4–0	(Germany) Rita Jakisch
(Wales) Jak Jones	w/o–w/d	(Germany) Hans-Jürgen Bins
(Netherlands) Maurice Le Duc	4–0	(Germany) Anne-Kathrin Hirsch
(England) Ashley Wright	4–0	(Republic of Ireland) Douglas Hogan
(Germany) Christof Biniarsch	w/o–w/d	(England) Steve Ventham
(Austria) Patrick Rossmann	w/o–w/d	(England) Ryan Causton
(Republic of Ireland) Michael Judge	w/d–w/o	(England) Ian Burns
(Republic of Ireland) Leo Fernandez	w/d–w/o	(Germany) Robert Sax
(Canada) Brent Kolbeck	w/d–w/o	(England) Declan Bristow
(Netherlands) Rogier van der Kamp	0–4	(England) Jamie Walker
(Scotland) Marc Davis	4–0	(Germany) Thomas Valentin
(England) Stephen Craigie	4–0	(Germany) Rüdiger Nickel
(England) Gary Wilson	4–1	(Germany) Thomas Wacker
(England) Lee Farebrother	w/d–w/o	(Germany) Jörg Petersen
(Scotland) Jonathan Fulcher	0–4	(England) Jamie O'Neill
(Germany) Martin Rösler	0–4	(England) Ian Glover
(Germany) Christian Ozim	4–0	(Germany) Ralph Enax
(England) James Welsh	4–1	(England) Zen Beechey
(Switzerland) Angelo Losi	1–4	(Netherlands) Xander van Rossum
(Germany) Frank Schröder	1–4	(England) Martin O'Donnell
(England) Nick Jennings	4–0	(Germany) Bernd Friedrich
(England) Nick Pearce	w/d–w/o	(Croatia) Stevo Vucicevic
(France) Stéphane Ochoïski	1–4	(England) (England) Robbie Williams
(Germany) Patrick Einsle	4–0	(Germany) Mirko Groß
(Germany) Robert Drahn	0–4	(England) Michael Wild
(Austria) Michael Peyr	0–4	(China) Zhang Anda
(Germany) Nicole Breitenstein	0–4	(Germany) Jörg Vortkort
(Germany) Lothar Kempgens	0–4	(Turkey) Ali Kirim
(Netherlands) Florian Moederscheim	2–4	(England) Kyren Wilson
(England) Saqib Nasir	w/d–w/o	(England) Sydney Wilson

==== Round 3 ====
Best of 7 frames

(Germany) Stefan Gerst	1–4	(England) Sanderson Lam
(England) Liam Monk	4–1	(England) Michael Wasley
(China) Chen Zhe	4–0	(Germany) Norbert Hofheinz
(Netherlands) Gerrit bij de Leij	0–4	(England) Steve Judd
(England) Lee Page	4–1	(Austria) Andreas Ploner
(England) Christopher Henry	0–4	(Wales) Kishan Hirani
(England) Chris Norbury	4–0	(Germany) Rüdiger Fehrmann
(Germany) Phil Barnes	4–3	(Germany) Lasse Münstermann
(Belgium) Hans Blanckaert	4–1	(Germany) Gerhard Engelschalk
(Germany) Julian Treiber	0–4	(Germany) Stefan Joachim
(England) Allan Taylor	2–4	(England) Ben Harrison
(Germany) Michael Betzinger	0–4	(England) Mitchell Travis
(Wales) Gareth Allen	2–4	(Republic of Ireland) Joe Delaney
(England) Sean O'Sullivan	4–0	(Austria) Markus Stocker
(Switzerland) Alexander Ursenbacher	0–4	(England) Sam Harvey
(Germany) Andreas Pesch	0–4	(England) Phil O’Kane

(England) Brian Cox	4–0	(Germany) Oliver Kremp
(England) Craig Steadman	4–3	(Wales) Jak Jones
(Netherlands) Maurice Le Duc	1–4	(England) Ashley Wright
(Germany) Christof Biniarsch	4–1	(Austria) Patrick Rossmann
(England) Ian Burns	4–0	(Germany) Robert Sax
(England) Declan Bristow	1–4	(England) Jamie Walker
(Scotland) Marc Davis	1–4	(England) Stephen Craigie
(England) Gary Wilson	4–0	(Germany) Jörg Petersen
(England) Jamie O'Neill	4–2	(England) Ian Glover
(Germany) Christian Ozim	1–4	(England) James Welsh
(Netherlands) Xander van Rossum	0–4	(England) Martin O'Donnell
(England) Nick Jennings	4–0	(Croatia) Stevo Vucicevic
(England) Robbie Williams	4–0	(Germany) Patrick Einsle
(England) Michael Wild	0–4	(China) Zhang Anda
(Germany) Jörg Vortkort	3–4	(Turkey) Ali Kirim
(England) Kyren Wilson	w/o–w/d	(England) Sydney Wilson

=== Main rounds ===
==== Top half ====
===== Section 1 =====
Last 128; Best of 7 frames
(Wales) Mark Williams	4
(England) Sanderson Lam	0
(Northern Ireland) Gerard Greene	1
(Thailand) Passakorn Suwannawat	4
(Republic of Ireland) Ken Doherty	4
(England) Liam Monk	0
(China) Liu Song	4
(China) Chen Zhe	1
(England) Mike Dunn	4
(Poland) Kacper Filipiak	1
(England) Liam Highfield	w/d
(England) Ben Woollaston	w/o
(Wales) Jamie Jones	4
(China) Cao Yupeng	2
(England) Jack Lisowski	4
(England) Steve Judd	1

Last 64; Best of 7 frames
(Wales) Mark Williams	1
(Thailand) Passakorn Suwannawat	4
(Republic of Ireland) Ken Doherty	4
(China) Liu Song	2
(England) Mike Dunn	2
(England) Ben Woollaston	4
(Wales) Jamie Jones	4
(England) Jack Lisowski	3

Last 32; Best of 7 frames
(Thailand) Passakorn Suwannawat	4
(Republic of Ireland) Ken Doherty	2
(England) Ben Woollaston	1
(Wales) Jamie Jones	4

Last 16; Best of 7 frames
(Thailand) Passakorn Suwannawat	4
(Wales) Jamie Jones	2

===== Section 2 =====
Last 128; Best of 7 frames
(England) Mark Joyce	4
(England) Lee Page	2
(England) Barry Pinches	0
(China) Tian Pengfei	4
(England) Mark King	4
(Wales) Kishan Hirani	2
(Wales) Matthew Stevens	4
(England) Paul Davison	1
(Australia) Neil Robertson	4
(England) Chris Norbury	0
(Malta) Tony Drago	w/d
(Republic of Ireland) David Hogan	w/o
(England) Peter Lines	4
(England) David Gilbert	3
(England) Ali Carter	w/d
(England) Andrew Norman	w/o

Last 64; Best of 7 frames
(England) Mark Joyce	4
(China) Tian Pengfei	2
(England) Mark King	4
(Wales) Matthew Stevens	1
(Australia) Neil Robertson	4
(Republic of Ireland) David Hogan	2
(England) Peter Lines	4
(England) Andrew Norman	2

Last 32; Best of 7 frames
(England) Mark Joyce	4
(England) Mark King	3
(Australia) Neil Robertson	4
(England) Peter Lines	1

Last 16; Best of 7 frames
(England) Mark Joyce	2
(Australia) Neil Robertson	4

===== Section 3 =====
Last 128; Best of 7 frames
(England) Jimmy White	4
(Norway) Kurt Maflin	0
(England) Mark Davis	w/o
(Belgium) Bjorn Haneveer	w/d
(Hong Kong) Marco Fu	3
(England) Sam Baird	4
(England) Jamie Cope	4
(Germany) Phil Barnes	2
(England) Adrian Gunnell	4
(Belgium) Hans Blanckaert	0
(England) Matthew Selt	4
(England) David Grace	3
(England) Joe Perry	4
(Germany) Stefan Joachim	0
(Wales) Dominic Dale	4
(Republic of Ireland) David Morris	1

Last 64; Best of 7 frames
(England) Jimmy White	2
(England) Mark Davis	4
(England) Sam Baird	2
(England) Jamie Cope	4
(England) Adrian Gunnell	0
(England) Matthew Selt	4
(England) Joe Perry	3
(Wales) Dominic Dale	4

Last 32; Best of 7 frames
(England) Mark Davis	4
(England) Jamie Cope	2
(England) Matthew Selt	4
(Wales) Dominic Dale	2

Last 16; Best of 7 frames
(England) Mark Davis	4
(England) Matthew Selt	2

===== Section 4 =====
Last 128; Best of 7 frames
(England) Shaun Murphy	w/o
(India) Lucky Vatnani	w/d
(China) Liang Wenbo	w/d
(Wales) Michael White	w/o
(England) Martin Gould	4
(England) Ben Harrison	1
(England) Nigel Bond	2
(Thailand) Dechawat Poomjaeng	4
(England) Rod Lawler	4
(England) Mitchell Travis	1
(Republic of Ireland) Fergal O'Brien	4
(Republic of Ireland) Joe Delaney	3
(China) Ding Junhui	4
(England) Sean O'Sullivan	1
(Scotland) Marcus Campbell	4
(Scotland) Scott MacKenzie	2

Last 64; Best of 7 frames
(England) Shaun Murphy	3
(Wales) Michael White	4
(England) Martin Gould	4
(Thailand) Dechawat Poomjaeng	1
(England) Rod Lawler	1
(Republic of Ireland) Fergal O'Brien	4
(China) Ding Junhui	4
(Scotland) Marcus Campbell	1

Last 32; Best of 7 frames
(Wales) Michael White	4
(England) Martin Gould	1
(Republic of Ireland) Fergal O'Brien	4
(China) Ding Junhui	3

Last 16; Best of 7 frames
(Wales) Michael White	2
(Republic of Ireland) Fergal O'Brien	4

==== Bottom half ====
===== Section 5 =====
Last 128; Best of 7 frames
(England) Mark Selby	4
(England) Sam Harvey	0
(England) Rory McLeod	4
(England) Phil O’Kane	2
(England) Barry Hawkins	4
(England) Brian Cox	0
(England) Ian McCulloch	3
(England) Craig Steadman	4
(England) Peter Ebdon	3
(Thailand) James Wattana	4
(England) Judd Trump	4
(England) Ashley Wright	0
(China) Liu Chuang	w/o
(Northern Ireland) Joe Meara	w/d
(England) Andrew Higginson	4
(England) Adam Wicheard	1

Last 64; Best of 7 frames
(England) Mark Selby	4
(England) Rory McLeod	0
(England) Barry Hawkins	1
(England) Craig Steadman	4
(Thailand) James Wattana	1
(England) Judd Trump	4
(China) Liu Chuang	2
(England) Andrew Higginson	4

Last 32; Best of 7 frames
(England) Mark Selby	4
(England) Craig Steadman	0
(England) Judd Trump	3
(England) Andrew Higginson	4

Last 16; Best of 7 frames
(England) Mark Selby	4
(England) Andrew Higginson	0

===== Section 6 =====
Last 128; Best of 7 frames
(Northern Ireland) Mark Allen	4
(Germany) Christof Biniarsch	0
(England) Joe Jogia	4
(Wales) Daniel Wells	2
(Wales) Ryan Day	1
(India) Aditya Mehta	4
(England) Stuart Bingham	w/d
(England) Simon Bedford	w/o
(England) Stephen Lee	4
(England) Ian Burns	0
(Scotland) Alan McManus	2
(England) Jamie Walker	4
(England) Ricky Walden	4
(England) Stuart Carrington	2
(England) Alfie Burden	3
(England) Stephen Craigie	4

Last 64; Best of 7 frames
(Northern Ireland) Mark Allen	2
(England) Joe Jogia	4
(India) Aditya Mehta	4
(England) Simon Bedford	0
(England) Stephen Lee	4
(England) Jamie Walker	1
(England) Ricky Walden	4
(England) Stephen Craigie	2

Last 32; Best of 7 frames
(England) Joe Jogia	4
(India) Aditya Mehta	3
(England) Stephen Lee	4
(England) Ricky Walden	0

Last 16; Best of 7 frames
(England) Joe Jogia	1
(England) Stephen Lee	4

===== Section 7 =====
Last 128; Best of 7 frames
(England) Steve Davis	4
(England) Gary Wilson	0
(England) Dave Harold	0
(England) Jamie O'Neill	4
(Scotland) Graeme Dott	w/d
(England) James Welsh	w/o
(England) Tom Ford	2
(China) Yu Delu	4
(Wales) Andrew Pagett	4
(Belgium) Luca Brecel	2
(England) Robert Milkins	4
(England) Martin O'Donnell	1
(England) Jimmy Robertson	4
(England) Nick Jennings	1
(England) Matthew Couch	0
(England) Robbie Williams	4

Last 64; Best of 7 frames
(England) Steve Davis	4
(England) Jamie O'Neill	3
(England) James Welsh	1
(China) Yu Delu	4
(Wales) Andrew Pagett	4
(England) Robert Milkins	2
(England) Jimmy Robertson	4
(England) Robbie Williams	2

Last 32; Best of 7 frames
(England) Steve Davis	2
(China) Yu Delu	4
(Wales) Andrew Pagett	2
(England) Jimmy Robertson	4

Last 16; Best of 7 frames
(China) Yu Delu	4
(England) Jimmy Robertson	2

===== Section 8 =====
Last 128; Best of 7 frames
(England) Anthony Hamilton	2
(England) Adam Duffy	4
(Northern Ireland) Joe Swail	4
(China) Zhang Anda	3
(England) Ronnie O'Sullivan	4
(Turkey) Ali Kirim	0
(Scotland) Anthony McGill	4
(England) Kyren Wilson	2
(China) Xiao Guodong	4
(England) Bash Maqsood	1
(England) Michael Holt	3
(China) Li Yan	4
(Scotland) Stephen Hendry	w/o
(Finland) Robin Hull	w/d
(Scotland) John Higgins	4
(England) Sam Craigie	1

Last 64; Best of 7 frames
(England) Adam Duffy	4
(Northern Ireland) Joe Swail	0
(England) Ronnie O'Sullivan	4
(Scotland) Anthony McGill	1
(China) Xiao Guodong	0
(China) Li Yan	4
(Scotland) Stephen Hendry	0
(Scotland) John Higgins	4

Last 32; Best of 7 frames
(England) Adam Duffy	0
(England) Ronnie O'Sullivan	4
(China) Li Yan	4
(Scotland) John Higgins	3

Last 16; Best of 7 frames
(England) Ronnie O'Sullivan	4
(China) Li Yan	2

==== Finals ====
Quarter-finals; Best of 7 frames		Semi-finals; Best of 7 frames		Final; Best of 7 frames
(Thailand) Passakorn Suwannawat	1
(Australia) Neil Robertson	4	(Australia) Neil Robertson	2
(England) Mark Davis	4	(England) Mark Davis	4
(Republic of Ireland) Fergal O'Brien	0			(England) Mark Davis	0
(England) Mark Selby	4			(England) Mark Selby	4
(England) Stephen Lee	1	(England) Mark Selby	4
(China) Yu Delu	3	(England) Ronnie O'Sullivan	3
(England) Ronnie O'Sullivan	4

== Century breaks ==
Only from last 128 onwards.

- 147, 107, 103, 102 – Ronnie O'Sullivan
- 142, 124 – John Higgins
- 139, 103 – Ding Junhui
- 135 – Mark Davis
- 135 – Liu Song
- 134, 117, 102 – Neil Robertson
- 131, 106 – Steve Davis
- 129, 105, 102 – Jimmy Robertson
- 129 – Jamie Cope
- 126, 119 – Mark Selby
- 121 – Adam Duffy
- 120 – Jimmy White
- 112, 108, 100 – Yu Delu
- 111 – Andrew Higginson
- 110 – Zhang Anda
- 109 – David Gilbert
- 108 – Robbie Williams
- 105 – Marcus Campbell
- 104 – Shaun Murphy
- 104 – Matthew Stevens
- 103 – Sam Craigie
- 103 – Fergal O'Brien
- 102 – Alfie Burden
- 102 – Mike Dunn
- 102 – Mark King
- 101 – Sam Baird
