= 2011 World Cup (snooker) =

World Cup

Tournament information
- Dates: 11–17 July 2011
- Venue: Bangkok Convention Centre
- City: Bangkok
- Country: Thailand
- Organisation: WPBSA
- Format: Non-ranking team event
- Total prize fund: $700,000
- Winner's share: $200,000
- Highest break: 139

Final
- Champion: China; Ding Junhui; Liang Wenbo
- Runner-up: Northern Ireland; Mark Allen; Gerard Greene
- Score: 4–2

The 2011 PTT-EGAT World Cup was a professional non-ranking team snooker tournament that took place from 11 to 17 July 2011 at the Bangkok Convention Centre in Bangkok, Thailand. It was the 13th edition of the event, and it was televised live by Eurosport.

The tournament was last held 1996 in Thailand, where Scotland consisting of Stephen Hendry, John Higgins and Alan McManus defeated Ireland, represented by Ken Doherty, Fergal O'Brien and Michael Judge, 10–7 in the final.

Ding Junhui and Liang Wenbo won the first title for China by defeating Northern Ireland, represented by Mark Allen and Gerard Greene, 4–2 in the final.

== Prize fund ==
- Winner: $200,000
- Runner-Up: $100,000
- Semi-final: $60,000
- Quarter-final: $30,000
- Third in group: $15,000
- Fourth in group: $12,500
- Fifth in group: $7,500
- Highest break, round robin stage: $5,000
- Highest break, knock-out stage: $15,000
- Total: $700,000

== Format ==
Twenty teams of two players each participated in the tournament. The top eight nations were seeded. As the host nation, Thailand was represented by two teams. The teams were drawn into four groups of five. The top two teams in each group have gone through to the quarter-finals. Each match included singles and doubles frames.

=== Round robin stage ===
Each match consisted of five frames and all frames were played. Each player played one frame against each player in the other team plus one doubles frame.

Frames were played in following order:

1. Singles (Player 1 vs. Player 1)
2. Singles (Player 2 vs. Player 2)
3. Doubles (alternate visits)
4. Reverse singles (Player 1 vs. Player 2)
5. Reverse singles (Player 2 vs. Player 1)

One point was awarded in the group for every frame won. If two teams were tied on the same number of points following the group stage then the winner of the match between those two teams was ranked higher in the group. Players were not permitted to play consecutive frames in singles matches.

=== Knock-out stage ===
Matches were played over the best of 7 frames with a singles frame to determine winner if match was tied at 3 frames each. Players were not permitted to play consecutive frames in singles matches.

Frames were played in following order:

1. Singles (Player 1 vs. Player 1)
2. Singles (Player 2 vs. Player 2)
3. Doubles (alternate visits)
4. Reverse singles (Player 1 vs. Player 2)
5. Reverse singles (Player 2 vs. Player 1)
6. Doubles (alternate visits)
7. Singles (players nominated by captain).

== Teams and seeding ==
Rank	Country	Player 1	Player 2
1	Wales	Mark Williams	Matthew Stevens
2	Scotland	John Higgins	Stephen Maguire
3	England	Mark Selby	Ali Carter
4	China	Ding Junhui	Liang Wenbo
5	Australia	Neil Robertson	Steve Mifsud
6	Northern Ireland	Mark Allen	Gerard Greene
7	Hong Kong	Marco Fu	Fung Kwok Wai
8	Republic of Ireland	Ken Doherty	Fergal O'Brien
	Thailand A	James Wattana	Dechawat Poomjaeng
	Thailand B	Passakorn Suwannawat	Thepchaiya Un-Nooh
	Germany	Patrick Einsle	Lasse Münstermann
	Brazil	Fabio Luersen	Noel Rodrigues
	Belgium	Bjorn Haneveer	Luca Brecel
	Pakistan	Sahid Aftab	Muhammad Sajjad
	India	Aditya Mehta	Pankaj Advani
	Afghanistan	Mohammad Rais Senzahi	Saleh Mohammad
	United Arab Emirates	Mohammed Shehab	Mohammed Al Joaker
	Poland	Kacper Filipiak	Krzysztof Wróbel
	Malta	Tony Drago	Alex Borg
	Egypt	Wael Talat	Yasser El-Sherbini

== Round robin stage ==
=== Group A ===
POS	Seed	Team	MP	MW	ML	FW	FL	PTS
1	1	Wales	4	4	0	14	6	14
2	8	Republic of Ireland	4	2	2	11	9	11
3		Pakistan	4	2	2	10	10	10
4		Germany	4	1	3	9	11	9
5		Egypt	4	1	3	6	14	6

11 July 2011
Pakistan	3–2	Republic of Ireland	Egypt	3–2	Germany
Muhammad Sajjad	1–111	Ken Doherty	Yasser El-Sherbini	57–27	Lasse Münstermann
Sahid Aftab	79–17	Fergal O'Brien	Wael Talat	31–76	Patrick Einsle
Muhammad Sajjad/Sahid Aftab	63–49	Ken Doherty/Fergal O'Brien	Yasser El-Sherbini/Wael Talat	73–18	Lasse Münstermann/Patrick Einsle
Sahid Aftab	63–14	Ken Doherty	Wael Talat	26–77	Lasse Münstermann
Muhammad Sajjad	6–119	Fergal O'Brien	Yasser El-Sherbini	60–28	Patrick Einsle

12 July 2011
Pakistan	2–3	Germany	Wales	5–0	Egypt
Sahid Aftab	15–69	Patrick Einsle	Mark Williams	60–48	Yasser El-Sherbini
Muhammad Sajjad	43–66	Lasse Münstermann	Matthew Stevens	82–14	Wael Talat
Sahid Aftab/Muhammad Sajjad	69–20	Patrick Einsle/Lasse Münstermann	Mark Williams/Matthew Stevens	97–9	Yasser El-Sherbini/Wael Talat
Sahid Aftab	28–63	Lasse Münstermann	Mark Williams	73–47	Wael Talat
Muhammad Sajjad	63–47	Patrick Einsle	Matthew Stevens	67–41	Yasser El-Sherbini

13 July 2011
Egypt	1–4	Republic of Ireland	Wales	3–2	Germany
Wael Talat	43–34	Ken Doherty	Mark Williams	56–43	Patrick Einsle
Yasser El-Sherbini	31–54	Fergal O'Brien	Matthew Stevens	21–74	Lasse Münstermann
Wael Talat/Yasser El-Sherbini	42–70	Ken Doherty/Fergal O'Brien	Mark Williams/Matthew Stevens	90–0	Patrick Einsle/Lasse Münstermann
Wael Talat	43–68	Fergal O'Brien	Mark Williams	74–0	Lasse Münstermann
Yasser El-Sherbini	13–55	Ken Doherty	Matthew Stevens	14–58	Patrick Einsle

14 July 2011
Wales	3–2	Pakistan	Germany	2–3	Republic of Ireland
Mark Williams	81–21	Sahid Aftab	Patrick Einsle	60–24	Ken Doherty
Matthew Stevens	87–0	Muhammad Sajjad	Lasse Münstermann	1–79	Fergal O'Brien
Mark Williams/Matthew Stevens	74–37	Sahid Aftab/Muhammad Sajjad	Patrick Einsle/Lasse Münstermann	38–64	Ken Doherty/Fergal O'Brien
Mark Williams	53–66	Muhammad Sajjad	Patrick Einsle	61–21	Fergal O'Brien
Matthew Stevens	15–61	Sahid Aftab	Lasse Münstermann	45–74	Ken Doherty

15 July 2011
Egypt	2–3	Pakistan	Wales	3–2	Republic of Ireland
Wael Talat	65–30	Sahid Aftab	Mark Williams	76–49	Ken Doherty
Yasser El-Sherbini	10–57	Muhammad Sajjad	Matthew Stevens	77–56	Fergal O'Brien
Wael Talat/Yasser El-Sherbini	67–35	Sahid Aftab/Muhammad Sajjad	Mark Williams/Matthew Stevens	4–58	Ken Doherty/Fergal O'Brien
Wael Talat	48–79	Muhammad Sajjad	Mark Williams	75–23	Fergal O'Brien
Yasser El-Sherbini	22–72	Sahid Aftab	Matthew Stevens	6–62	Ken Doherty

=== Group B ===
POS	Seed	Team	MP	MW	ML	FW	FL	PTS
1	4	China	4	4	0	13	7	13
2	5	Australia	4	3	1	13	7	13
3		Malta	4	2	2	12	8	12
4		Thailand A	4	1	3	8	12	8
5		United Arab Emirates	4	0	4	4	16	4

11 July 2011
Thailand A	1–4	Australia	China	3–2	Malta
James Wattana	27–67	Neil Robertson	Ding Junhui	61–64	Tony Drago
Dechawat Poomjaeng	71–1	Steve Mifsud	Liang Wenbo	80–1	Alex Borg
James Wattana/Dechawat Poomjaeng	22–71	Neil Robertson/Steve Mifsud	Ding Junhui/Liang Wenbo	88–26	Tony Drago/Alex Borg
James Wattana	53–81	Steve Mifsud	Liang Wenbo	2–65	Tony Drago
Dechawat Poomjaeng	60–79	Neil Robertson	Ding Junhui	120–8	Alex Borg

12 July 2011
Malta	2–3	Australia	Thailand A	4–1	United Arab Emirates
Tony Drago	67–43	Neil Robertson	James Wattana	79–48	Mohammed Shehab
Alex Borg	53–77	Steve Mifsud	Dechawat Poomjaeng	77–24	Mohammed Al Joaker
Tony Drago/Alex Borg	60–10	Neil Robertson/Steve Mifsud	James Wattana/Dechawat Poomjaeng	6–101	Mohammed Shehab/Mohammed Al Joaker
Tony Drago	0–132	Steve Mifsud	James Wattana	81–25	Mohammed Al Joaker
Alex Borg	7–63	Neil Robertson	Dechawat Poomjaeng	70–21	Mohammed Shehab

13 July 2011
Thailand A	2–3	Malta	China	3–2	United Arab Emirates
James Wattana	55–44	Tony Drago	Ding Junhui	15–63	Mohammed Shehab
Dechawat Poomjaeng	24–66	Alex Borg	Liang Wenbo	64–18	Mohammed Al Joaker
James Wattana/Dechawat Poomjaeng	27–66	Tony Drago/Alex Borg	Ding Junhui/Liang Wenbo	49–78	Mohammed Shehab/Mohammed Al Joaker
James Wattana	51–67	Alex Borg	Ding Junhui	100–1	Mohammed Al Joaker
Dechawat Poomjaeng	66–59	Tony Drago	Liang Wenbo	78–43	Mohammed Shehab

14 July 2011
United Arab Emirates	0–5	Malta	China	3–2	Australia
Mohammed Shehab	0–112	Tony Drago	Ding Junhui	55–64	Neil Robertson
Mohammed Al Joaker	26–65	Alex Borg	Liang Wenbo	75–31	Steve Mifsud
Mohammed Shehab/Mohammed Al Joaker	25–63	Tony Drago/Alex Borg	Ding Junhui/Liang Wenbo	75–21	Neil Robertson/Steve Mifsud
Mohammed Shehab	32–80	Alex Borg	Ding Junhui	75–18	Steve Mifsud
Mohammed Al Joaker	13–106	Tony Drago	Liang Wenbo	42–74	Neil Robertson

15 July 2011
United Arab Emirates	1–4	Australia	Thailand A	1–4	China
Mohammed Shehab	1–66	Neil Robertson	James Wattana	27–62	Ding Junhui
Mohammed Al Joaker	0–88	Steve Mifsud	Dechawat Poomjaeng	29–72	Liang Wenbo
Mohammed Shehab/Mohammed Al Joaker	1–77	Neil Robertson/Steve Mifsud	James Wattana/Dechawat Poomjaeng	77–21	Ding Junhui/Liang Wenbo
Mohammed Shehab	78–49	Steve Mifsud	Dechawat Poomjaeng	1–71	Liang Wenbo
Mohammed Al Joaker	45–63	Neil Robertson	James Wattana	0–95	Ding Junhui

=== Group C ===
POS	Seed	Team	MP	MW	ML	FW	FL	PTS
1	3	England	4	4	0	14	6	14
2	6	Northern Ireland	4	3	1	13	7	13
3		India	4	2	2	9	11	9
4		Belgium	4	0	4	8	12	8
5		Brazil	4	1	3	6	14	6

11 July 2011
Brazil	3–2	Belgium	India	1–4	Northern Ireland
Noel Rodrigues	86–25	Bjorn Haneveer	Pankaj Advani	25–96	Gerard Greene
Fabio Luersen	55–46	Luca Brecel	Aditya Mehta	0–108	Mark Allen
Noel Rodrigues/Fabio Luersen	27–61	Bjorn Haneveer/Luca Brecel	Pankaj Advani/Aditya Mehta	44–64	Gerard Greene/Mark Allen
Fabio Luersen	62–26	Bjorn Haneveer	Pankaj Advani	52–77	Mark Allen
Noel Rodrigues	8–59	Luca Brecel	Aditya Mehta	71–32	Gerard Greene

12 July 2011
India	3–2	Belgium	England	4–1	Brazil
Pankaj Advani	33–94	Luca Brecel	Mark Selby	59–45	Fabio Luersen
Aditya Mehta	64–4	Bjorn Haneveer	Ali Carter	90–0	Noel Rodrigues
Pankaj Advani/Aditya Mehta	65–66	Luca Brecel/Bjorn Haneveer	Mark Selby/Ali Carter	54–91	Fabio Luersen/Noel Rodrigues
Aditya Mehta	74–43	Luca Brecel	Mark Selby	124–0	Noel Rodrigues
Pankaj Advani	64–58	Bjorn Haneveer	Ali Carter	69–7	Fabio Luersen

13 July 2011
Brazil	1–4	Northern Ireland	England	3–2	Belgium
Fabio Luersen	1–75	Mark Allen	Mark Selby	79–7	Bjorn Haneveer
Noel Rodrigues	33–65	Gerard Greene	Ali Carter	4–69	Luca Brecel
Fabio Luersen/Noel Rodrigues	1–67	Mark Allen/Gerard Greene	Mark Selby/Ali Carter	78–0	Bjorn Haneveer/Luca Brecel
Fabio Luersen	27–71	Gerard Greene	Mark Selby	102–28	Luca Brecel
Noel Rodrigues	82–13	Mark Allen	Ali Carter	6–67	Bjorn Haneveer

14 July 2011
Belgium	2–3	Northern Ireland	England	4–1	India
Bjorn Haneveer	0–96	Mark Allen	Mark Selby	79–25	Aditya Mehta
Luca Brecel	20–53	Gerard Greene	Ali Carter	70–18	Pankaj Advani
Bjorn Haneveer/Luca Brecel	66–14	Mark Allen/Gerard Greene	Mark Selby/Ali Carter	49–70	Aditya Mehta/Pankaj Advani
Bjorn Haneveer	12–69	Gerard Greene	Mark Selby	76–4	Pankaj Advani
Luca Brecel	128–1	Mark Allen	Ali Carter	57–5	Aditya Mehta

15 July 2011
Brazil	1–4	India	England	3–2	Northern Ireland
Fabio Luersen	29–70	Aditya Mehta	Mark Selby	70–13	Mark Allen
Noel Rodrigues	52–62	Pankaj Advani	Ali Carter	10–60	Gerard Greene
Fabio Luersen/Noel Rodrigues	0–87	Aditya Mehta/Pankaj Advani	Mark Selby/Ali Carter	13–110	Mark Allen/Gerard Greene
Fabio Luersen	68–78	Pankaj Advani	Mark Selby	119–0	Gerard Greene
Noel Rodrigues	97–29	Aditya Mehta	Ali Carter	64–14	Mark Allen

=== Group D ===
POS	Seed	Team	MP	MW	ML	FW	FL	PTS
1	2	Scotland	4	4	0	13	7	13
2	7	Hong Kong	4	2	2	11	9	11
3		Thailand B	4	2	2	10	10	10
4		Afghanistan	4	1	3	9	11	9
5		Poland	4	1	3	7	13	7

11 July 2011
Thailand B	3–2	Afghanistan	Hong Kong	2–3	Poland
Thepchaiya Un-Nooh	112–5	Mohammad Rais Senzahi	Marco Fu	43–61	Kacper Filipiak
Passakorn Suwannawat	0–78	Saleh Mohammad	Fung Kwok Wai	61–75	Krzysztof Wróbel
Thepchaiya Un-Nooh/Passakorn Suwannawat	57–48	Mohammad Rais Senzahi/Saleh Mohammad	Marco Fu/Fung Kwok Wai	37–80	Kacper Filipiak/Krzysztof Wróbel
Passakorn Suwannawat	40–88	Mohammad Rais Senzahi	Fung Kwok Wai	84–8	Kacper Filipiak
Thepchaiya Un-Nooh	82–37	Saleh Mohammad	Marco Fu	60–29	Krzysztof Wróbel

12 July 2011
Scotland	3–2	Poland	Afghanistan	2–3	Hong Kong
John Higgins	3–76	Kacper Filipiak	Mohammad Rais Senzahi	72–45	Marco Fu
Stephen Maguire	75–31	Krzysztof Wróbel	Saleh Mohammad	43–80	Fung Kwok Wai
John Higgins/Stephen Maguire	59–47	Kacper Filipiak/Krzysztof Wróbel	Mohammad Rais Senzahi/Saleh Mohammad	63–66	Marco Fu/Fung Kwok Wai
John Higgins	66–18	Krzysztof Wróbel	Mohammad Rais Senzahi	66–12	Fung Kwok Wai
Stephen Maguire	36–70	Kacper Filipiak	Saleh Mohammad	0–75	Marco Fu

13 July 2011
Scotland	4–1	Afghanistan	Thailand B	1–4	Hong Kong
John Higgins	80–16	Mohammad Rais Senzahi	Passakorn Suwannawat	78–38	Marco Fu
Stephen Maguire	74–0	Saleh Mohammad	Thepchaiya Un-Nooh	15–61	Fung Kwok Wai
John Higgins/Stephen Maguire	66–45	Mohammad Rais Senzahi/Saleh Mohammad	Passakorn Suwannawat/Thepchaiya Un-Nooh	57–66	Marco Fu/Fung Kwok Wai
John Higgins	14–82	Saleh Mohammad	Passakorn Suwannawat	46–79	Fung Kwok Wai
Stephen Maguire	53–51	Mohammad Rais Senzahi	Thepchaiya Un-Nooh	27–64	Marco Fu

14 July 2011
Poland	1–4	Afghanistan	Scotland	3–2	Thailand B
Kacper Filipiak	80–19	Mohammad Rais Senzahi	John Higgins	47–93	Passakorn Suwannawat
Krzysztof Wróbel	24–92	Saleh Mohammad	Stephen Maguire	100–3	Thepchaiya Un-Nooh
Kacper Filipiak/Krzysztof Wróbel	25–66	Mohammad Rais Senzahi/Saleh Mohammad	John Higgins/Stephen Maguire	0–109	Passakorn Suwannawat/Thepchaiya Un-Nooh
Kacper Filipiak	7–58	Saleh Mohammad	John Higgins	61–20	Thepchaiya Un-Nooh
Krzysztof Wróbel	52–74	Mohammad Rais Senzahi	Stephen Maguire	86–0	Passakorn Suwannawat

15 July 2011
Thailand B	4–1	Poland	Scotland	3–2	Hong Kong
Passakorn Suwannawat	139–0	Kacper Filipiak	John Higgins	72–18	Marco Fu
Thepchaiya Un-Nooh	66–13	Krzysztof Wróbel	Stephen Maguire	129–4	Fung Kwok Wai
Thepchaiya Un-Nooh/Passakorn Suwannawat	1–51	Kacper Filipiak/Krzysztof Wróbel	John Higgins/Stephen Maguire	4–99	Marco Fu/Fung Kwok Wai
Passakorn Suwannawat	68–10	Krzysztof Wróbel	John Higgins	93–9	Fung Kwok Wai
Thepchaiya Un-Nooh	82–21	Kacper Filipiak	Stephen Maguire	17–63	Marco Fu

== Knock-out stage ==
Quarter-finals; Best of 7 frames
A1	Wales	4
B2	Australia	2
B1	China	4
A2	Republic of Ireland	1
C1	England	3
D2	Hong Kong	4
D1	Scotland	3
C2	Northern Ireland	4

Semi-finals; Best of 7 frames
A1	Wales	1
B1	China	4
D2	Hong Kong	3
C2	Northern Ireland	4

Final; Best of 7 frames
B1	China	4
C2	Northern Ireland	2

=== Quarter-finals ===
16 July 2011
Wales	4–2	Australia	China	4–1	Republic of Ireland
Mark Williams	96–10	Neil Robertson	Ding Junhui	81–40	Ken Doherty
Matthew Stevens	65–51	Steve Mifsud	Liang Wenbo	92–65	Fergal O'Brien
Mark Williams/Matthew Stevens	42–64	Neil Robertson/Steve Mifsud	Ding Junhui/Liang Wenbo	8–76	Ken Doherty/Fergal O'Brien
Mark Williams	75–7	Steve Mifsud	Ding Junhui	76–17	Fergal O'Brien
Matthew Stevens	25–61	Neil Robertson	Liang Wenbo	70–8	Ken Doherty
Mark Williams/Matthew Stevens	77–39	Steve Mifsud/Neil Robertson

England	3–4	Hong Kong	Scotland	3–4	Northern Ireland
Mark Selby	17–71	Marco Fu	John Higgins	50–60	Mark Allen
Ali Carter	57–22	Fung Kwok Wai	Stephen Maguire	0–75	Gerard Greene
Mark Selby/Ali Carter	25–64	Marco Fu/Fung Kwok Wai	John Higgins/Stephen Maguire	77–24	Mark Allen/Gerard Greene
Mark Selby	70–34	Fung Kwok Wai	John Higgins	85–0	Gerard Greene
Ali Carter	74–20	Marco Fu	Stephen Maguire	0–140	Mark Allen
Mark Selby/Ali Carter	69–82	Fung Kwok Wai/Marco Fu	John Higgins/Stephen Maguire	69–63	Gerard Greene/Mark Allen
Mark Selby	2–75	Marco Fu	John Higgins	27–86	Mark Allen

=== Semi-finals ===
17 July 2011
Wales	1–4	China	Hong Kong	3–4	Northern Ireland
Mark Williams	78–85	Ding Junhui	Marco Fu	9–73	Mark Allen
Matthew Stevens	96–25	Liang Wenbo	Fung Kwok Wai	8–74	Gerard Greene
Mark Williams/Matthew Stevens	6–100	Ding Junhui/Liang Wenbo	Marco Fu/Fung Kwok Wai	63–26	Mark Allen/Gerard Greene
Mark Williams	50–64	Liang Wenbo	Marco Fu	0–88	Gerard Greene
Matthew Stevens	21–77	Ding Junhui	Fung Kwok Wai	80–0	Mark Allen
			Marco Fu/Fung Kwok Wai	70–43	Gerard Greene/Mark Allen
			Marco Fu	0–102	Mark Allen

=== Final ===
17 July 2011
China	4–2	Northern Ireland
Ding Junhui	121–1	Mark Allen
Liang Wenbo	77–0	Gerard Greene
Ding Junhui/Liang Wenbo	77–36	Mark Allen/Gerard Greene
Ding Junhui	18–109	Gerard Greene
Liang Wenbo	55–69	Mark Allen
Ding Junhui/Liang Wenbo	89–0	Gerard Greene/Mark Allen

== Century breaks ==
There were 12 century breaks in the tournament.

- Thailand B – 139 Passakorn Suwannawat
- Northern Ireland – 128, 108 Mark Allen, 109 Gerard Greene, – 110 (Mark Allen & Gerard Greene) Doubles Frame alternate shots
- Scotland – 125 Stephen Maguire
- China – 120 Ding Junhui
- Ireland – 111 Ken Doherty, 101 Fergal O'Brien
- England – 102 Mark Selby
- Malta – 100 Tony Drago
- Belgium – 100 Luca Brecel
