= Itaro Santos =

German-Brazilian snooker player (born 1985)

Personal information
- Born: 28 July 1985 (age 41) Recife, Pernambuco

Sport
- Country: Brazil
- Sport: Snooker
- Professional: 2015–2017
- Highest ranking: 92 (May 2016)

Itaro Santos (born 28 July 1985) is a German-born Brazilian snooker player. Itaro is based at the Legends Snooker Academy in Leytonstone, England, United Kingdom.

== Career ==
Since 2004, Santos has also competed for Germany, as his native Brazil was not then a member of the IBSF. He is a two-time German Amateur Championship and together with Lasse Münstermann and Sascha Lippe competed as part of Team Germany at the European Team Snooker Championship of 2007. Through a wildcard Santos has also competed in the finals of the World Series of Snooker 2008/09. However he only managed to finish third in his group and failed to qualify for the next round.

Santos won the 2015 Pan American Championship to earn a two-year card for the snooker tour beginning with the 2015–16 season. He only played four matches in the 2015/2016 season, losing all of them. Santos also lost all 12 of his matches in the 2016–17 season, though he was 3–1 ahead of world number six Shaun Murphy at the UK Championship, but was beaten 6–3. He has now dropped off the tour.

== Performance and rankings timeline ==
Tournament	2002/ 03	2004/ 05	2008/ 09	2012/ 13	2014/ 15	2015/ 16	2016/ 17	2018/ 19
Ranking (Note: It shows the ranking at the beginning of the season)	(Note: He was an amateur)					(Note: New players on the Main Tour don't have a ranking)	92	
Ranking tournaments
Riga Masters (Note: The event was also called the Riga Open (2014/2015-2015/2016))	Tournament Not Held				Minor-Ranking		LQ	A
World Open (Note: The event was also called the LG Cup (2002/2003) and the Grand Prix (2004/2005, 2008/2009))	A	A	A	A	Not Held		LQ	A
Paul Hunter Classic (Note: The event was also called the Grand Prix Fürth (2004/2005))	NH	Pro-am Event		Minor-Ranking Event			A	1R
English Open	Tournament Not Held						1R	A
Northern Ireland Open	Tournament Not Held						1R	A
UK Championship	A	A	A	A	A	1R	1R	A
Scottish Open	A	Not Held		MR	Not Held		1R	A
German Masters	Tournament Not Held			A	A	LQ	LQ	A
World Grand Prix	Tournament Not Held				NR	DNQ	DNQ	DNQ
Welsh Open	A	A	A	A	A	1R	1R	A
Shoot Out	Tournament Not Held			Non-Ranking Event			1R	A
Indian Open	Tournament Not Held				A	NH	LQ	A
Players Championship (Note: The event was also called the Players Tour Championship Final (2012/2013, 2014/2015-2015/2016))	Tournament Not Held			DNQ	DNQ	DNQ	DNQ	DNQ
Gibraltar Open	Tournament Not Held					MR	WD	A
Tour Championship	Tournament Not Held							DNQ
China Open	NH	A	A	A	A	LQ	LQ	A
World Championship	LQ	LQ	A	A	LQ	A	LQ	A
Former ranking tournaments
Australian Goldfields Open	Tournament Not Held			A	A	A	Not Held	
Shanghai Masters	Not Held		A	A	A	A	LQ	NR
Former non-ranking tournaments
World Series Grand Final	Not Held		RR	Tournament Not Held				

Performance Table Legend
LQ	lost in the qualifying draw	#R	lost in the early rounds of the tournament (WR = Wildcard round, RR = Round robin)	QF	lost in the quarter-finals
SF	lost in the semi-finals	F	lost in the final	W	won the tournament
DNQ	did not qualify for the tournament	A	did not participate in the tournament	WD	withdrew from the tournament

NH / Not Held	means an event was not held.
NR / Non-Ranking Event	means an event is/was no longer a ranking event.
R / Ranking Event	means an event is/was a ranking event.
MR / Minor-Ranking Event	means an event is/was a minor-ranking event.
PA / Pro-am Event	means an event is/was a pro-am event.

== Tournament wins ==
=== Amateur ===
Outcome	No.	Year	Championship	Opponent in the final	Score
Winner	1.	2005	German Amateur Championship	(Germany) Lasse Münstermann	4–0
Runner-up	1.	2006	German Amateur Championship	(Germany) Lasse Münstermann	Unknown
Winner	2.	2008	German Amateur Championship	(Germany) Christian Gabriel	4–0
Runner-up	2.	2009	German Amateur Championship	(Germany) Patrick Einsle	2–4
Winner	1.	2015	Pan American Championship	(Brazil) Thadeu Nobres	6–0
