= Snooker at the 2005 World Games – men's singles =

Snooker men's singles at the 2005 World Games
- Venue: Saalbau Bottrop, Duisburg, Germany
- Dates: 20–24 July 2005
- Competitors: 16 from 11 nations

Medalists
gold medal	(United Kingdom) Gerard Greene
silver medal	(China) Ding Junhui
bronze medal	(Belgium) Bjorn Haneveer

The men's singles snooker competition at the 2005 World Games took place from 20 to 24 July 2005 at the Saalbau Bottrop in Duisburg, Germany.

== Last 16 ==
Bjorn Haneveer (Belgium)	3–0	(United Kingdom) Robert Stephen
Gavin Pantall (United Kingdom)	3–0	(South Africa) Abdul Mutalieb Allie
Gerard Greene (United Kingdom)	3–1	(Germany) Patrick Einsle
Tony Drago (Malta)	0–3	(Singapore) Keith E Boon Aun
Neil Robertson (Australia)	1–3	(Germany) Lasse Münstermann
Ding Junhui (China)	3–0	(United Arab Emirates) Eissa Al Hosani
Mark Allen (United Kingdom)	3–1	(Egypt) Hesham Abd El Salam
Michael Holt (United Kingdom)	3–0	(Brazil) Miguel Costa Filho

== Last 8 ==
Quarter-finals
(Belgium) Bjorn Haneveer	3
(United Kingdom) Gavin Pantall	2
(United Kingdom) Gerard Greene	3
(Singapore) Keith E Boon Aun	0
(Germany) Lasse Münstermann	0
(China) Ding Junhui	3
(United Kingdom) Mark Allen	3
(United Kingdom) Michael Holt	0

Semi-finals
(Belgium) Bjorn Haneveer	2
(United Kingdom) Gerard Greene	4
(China) Ding Junhui	4
(United Kingdom) Mark Allen	1

Gold medal match
(United Kingdom) Gerard Greene	4
(China) Ding Junhui	3
Bronze medal match
(Belgium) Bjorn Haneveer	4
(United Kingdom) Mark Allen	0
