= Simon Lichtenberg =

German snooker player

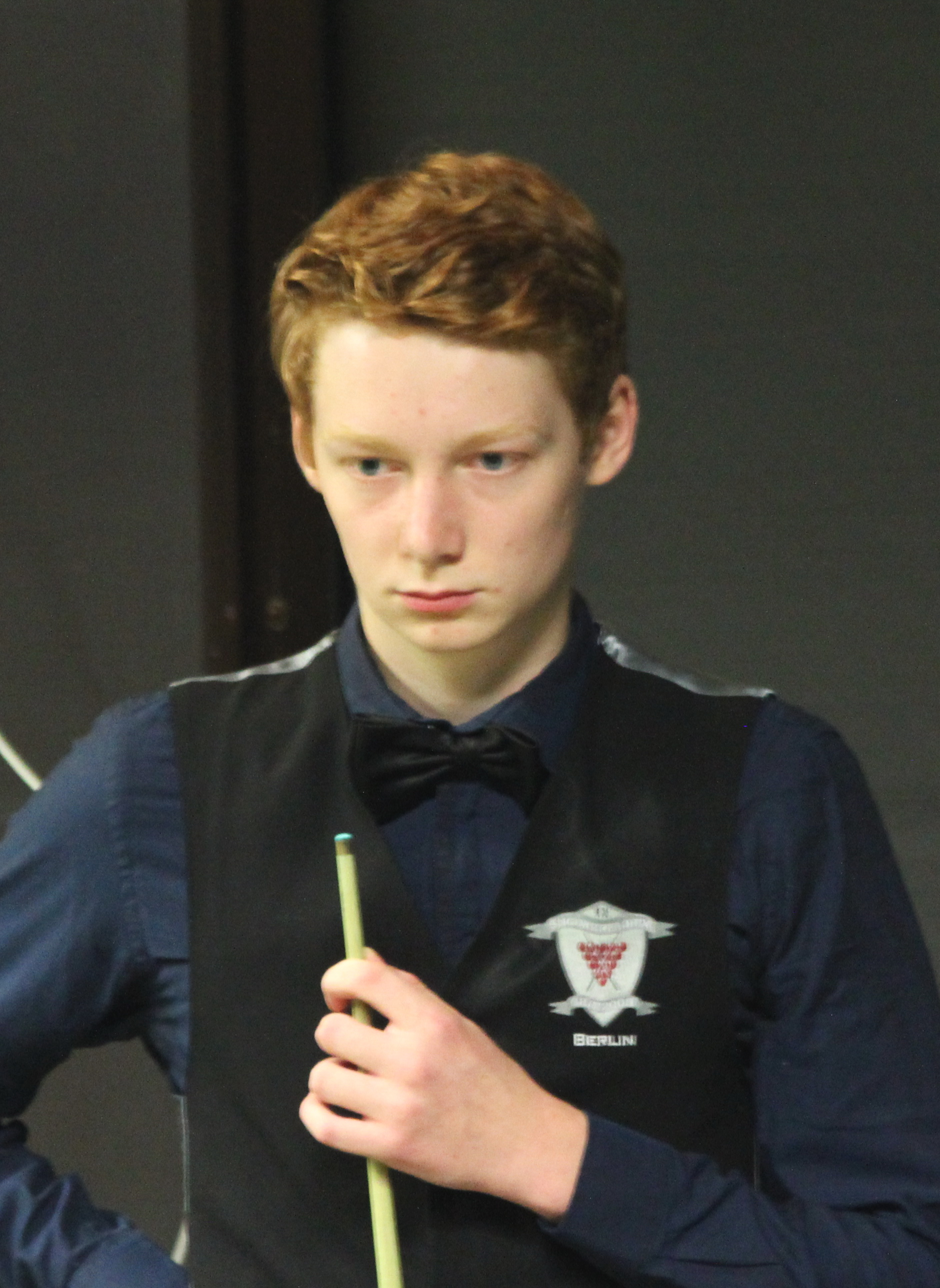
- Paul Hunter Classic 2016

Personal information
- Born: 15 December 1997 (age 28) Berlin, Germany

Sport
- Country: Germany
- Sport: Snooker
- Professional: 2018–2022
- Highest ranking: 72 (August 2021)

Simon Lichtenberg (born 15 December 1997) is a German former professional snooker player.

== Career ==
From Berlin, the son of British-German parents, Lichtenberg captained the league team of the Snookerfabrik (snooker factory) in Berlin. He was the German amateur champion in 2016 as he defeated 2014 winner Roman Dietzel in the final, by a 4-2 margin. He then won the EBSA European Under-21 Snooker Championships in 2018 in Sofia, Bulgaria, registering wins over top seed Brian Ochoiski in the semi-final, and a 6-3 win in the final against Welshman Tyler Rees. In doing so, he became Germany’s first champion in a major international amateur tournament. Following this win, he was awarded a two-year card for the professional snooker tour from the 2018–19 season onwards to become the second German on the tour that season after Lukas Kleckers.

He defeated Ryan Day at the 2020 Welsh Open for a big upset win in February 2020. Despite that, he lost his tour card at the end of the 2020 season after failing to make the top 64 in the world rankings, but he regained it in the first Q School event by beating Kishan Hirani, Stephen Craigie and Dean Young, before defeating Irishman Leo Fernandez 4–1 in the final round. He reached the last-64 of the 2020 English Open in Milton Keynes in October 2020, with a 4-3 win over experienced player Anthony Hamilton. He reached the last-64 of the 2020 UK Championship with a win over Scottish professional Scott Donaldson who was ranked 86 places higher. He reached the last-64 of the 2021 Snooker Shoot Out held in Milton Keynes in February 2021, with a win over Rebecca Kenna.

He competed at the IBSF World Championships in October 2024.

== Performance and rankings timeline ==
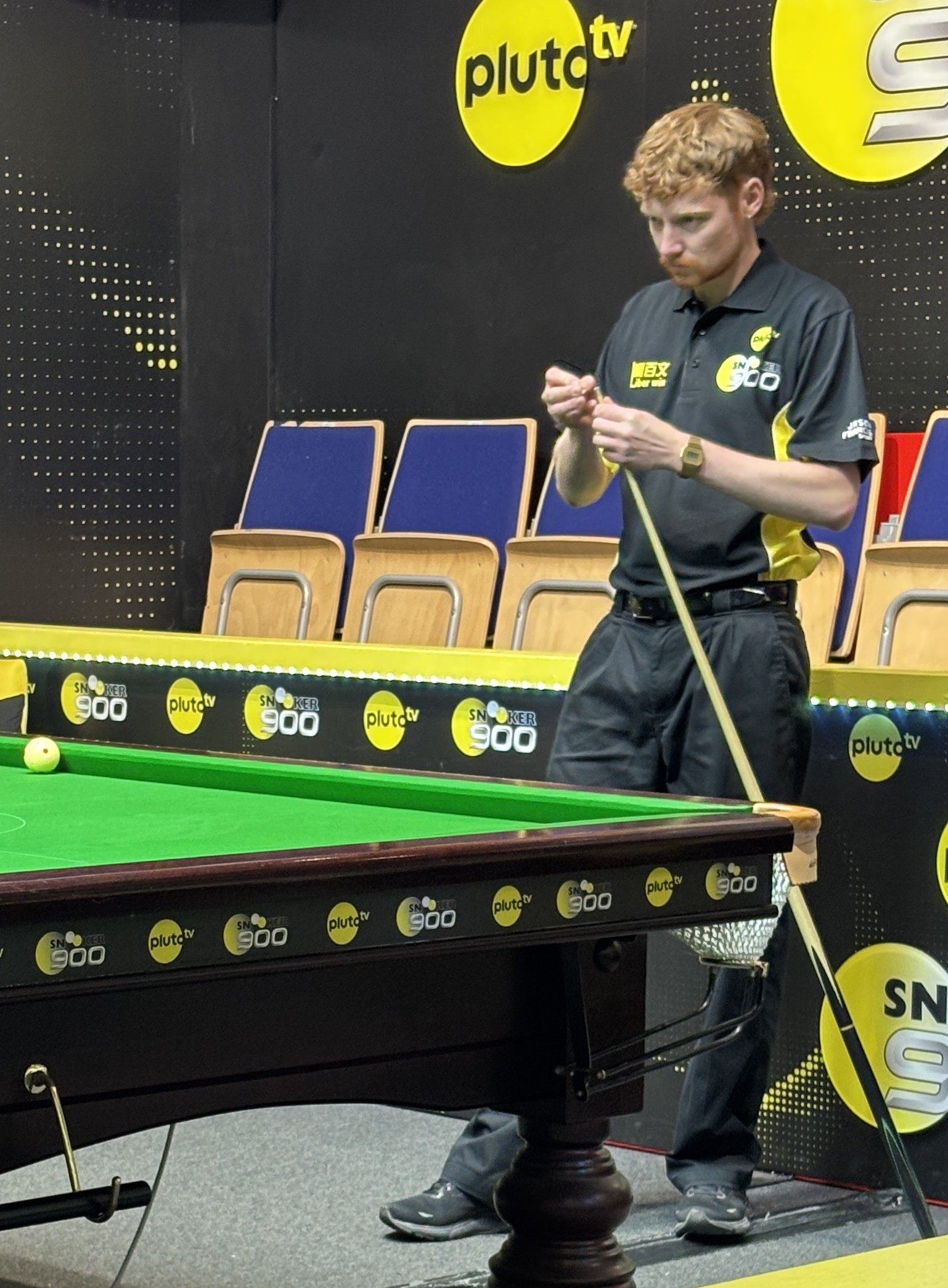
Lichtenberg in 2026

Tournament	2016/ 17	2017/ 18	2018/ 19	2019/ 20	2020/ 21	2021/ 22
Ranking (Note: It shows the ranking at the beginning of the season.)	(Note: He was an amateur.)		(Note: New players on the Main Tour don't have a ranking.)	93	(Note: Players qualified through Q School started the season without ranking points.)	71
Ranking tournaments
Championship League	Tournament Not Held				RR	RR
British Open	Tournament Not Held					1R
Northern Ireland Open	A	A	1R	1R	1R	1R
English Open	A	A	1R	1R	2R	LQ
UK Championship	A	A	1R	1R	2R	1R
Scottish Open	A	A	1R	1R	1R	LQ
World Grand Prix	DNQ	DNQ	DNQ	DNQ	DNQ	DNQ
Shoot-Out	A	A	1R	1R	2R	2R
German Masters	A	A	LQ	LQ	LQ	LQ
Players Championship	DNQ	DNQ	DNQ	DNQ	DNQ	DNQ
European Masters	A	A	LQ	LQ	2R	LQ
Welsh Open	A	A	1R	2R	2R	LQ
Turkish Masters	Tournament Not Held					1R
Gibraltar Open	LQ	2R	1R	1R	1R	WD
Tour Championship	Not Held		DNQ	DNQ	DNQ	DNQ
World Championship	A	A	LQ	LQ	LQ	LQ
Former ranking tournaments
Paul Hunter Classic	1R	LQ	2R	NR	Not Held	
Indian Open	A	A	LQ	Tournament Not Held		
China Open	A	A	LQ	Tournament Not Held		
Riga Masters	A	A	LQ	LQ	Not Held	
International Championship	A	A	LQ	LQ	Not Held	
China Championship	NR	A	LQ	LQ	Not Held	
World Open	A	A	1R	LQ	Not Held	
WST Pro Series	Tournament Not Held				RR	NH
Former non-ranking tournaments
Haining Open	A	A	1R	A	Not Held	

Performance Table Legend
LQ	lost in the qualifying draw	#R	lost in the early rounds of the tournament (WR = Wildcard round, RR = Round robin)	QF	lost in the quarter-finals
SF	lost in the semi-finals	F	lost in the final	W	won the tournament
DNQ	did not qualify for the tournament	A	did not participate in the tournament	WD	withdrew from the tournament

NH / Not Held	means an event was not held.
NR / Non-Ranking Event	means an event is/was no longer a ranking event.
R / Ranking Event	means an event is/was a ranking event.
MR / Minor-Ranking Event	means an event is/was a minor-ranking event.

== Career finals ==
=== Amateur finals: 11 (7 titles) ===
Outcome	No.	Year	Championship	Opponent in the final	Score
Runner-up	1.	2015	German Grand Prix - Event 1	(Germany) Lukas Kleckers	0–4
Runner-up	2.	2016	German Grand Prix - Event 1	(Austria) Andreas Ploner	1–3
Winner	1.	2016	German Grand Prix - Event 3	(Germany) Roman Dietzel	3–2
Runner-up	3.	2016	German Grand Prix - Event 4	(Netherlands) Roy Stolk	1–3
Winner	2.	2016	German Amateur Championship	(Germany) Roman Dietzel	4–2
Runner-up	4.	2017	German Grand Prix - Event 2	(Germany) Jan Eisenstein	1–3
Winner	3.	2017	German Grand Prix - Event 5	(Syria) Omar Alkojah	3–1
Winner	4.	2017	German 6-red Championship	(Germany) Christoph Gawlytta	5–1
Winner	5.	2018	EBSA European Under-21 Snooker Championships	(Wales) Tyler Rees	6–3
Winner	6.	2018	German Grand Prix - Event 4	(Germany) Jörn Hannes-Hühn	3–0
Winner	7.	2019	German Grand Prix - Event 4	(Germany) Richard Wienold	3–1
