= European Tour 2015/2016 – Event 2 =

European Tour 2015/2016 Event 2
Tournament information
- Dates: 26–30 August 2015
- Venue: Stadthalle
- City: Fürth
- Country: Germany
- Organisation: World Snooker
- Format: Minor-ranking event
- Total prize fund: €125,000
- Winner's share: €25,000
- Highest break: Dechawat Poomjaeng (THA) (142)

Final
- Champion: Ali Carter (ENG)
- Runner-up: Shaun Murphy (ENG)
- Score: 4–3

The European Tour 2015/2016 – Event 2 (also known as the 2015 Paul Hunter Classic) was a professional minor-ranking snooker tournament that took place between 26 and 30 August 2015 in Fürth, Germany.

Mark Allen was the defending champion, but he lost 3–4 to Sanderson Lam in the round of 128.

Ali Carter won his seventh professional title, beating Shaun Murphy 4–3 in the final.

== Prize fund ==
The breakdown of prize money of the event is shown below:

	Prize fund
Winner	€25,000
Runner-up	€12,000
Semi-finalist	€6,000
Quarter-finalist	€4,000
Last 16	€2,300
Last 32	€1,200
Last 64	€700
Total	€125,000

== Main draw ==
=== Preliminary rounds ===
==== Round 1 ====
Best of 7 frames

(Scotland) Michael Collumb	4–0	(Germany) Rolf Mahr
(Wales) Ben Jones	4–0	(Austria) Benjamin Buser
(England) Freddie Blunden	0–4	(England) Adam Longley
(Germany) Stefan Gerst	w/d–w/o	(England) Adam King
(Germany) Luca Kaufmann	4–0	(Republic of Ireland) Daniel O'Regan
(Germany) Robert Drahn	0–4	(Malta) Brian Cini
(Belgium) Jeff Jacobs	4–0	(Belgium) Gery De Mol
(England) Sam Thistlewhite	4–0	(Germany) Richard Wienold
(Germany) Paul Liebstreich	2–4	(England) Scott Lyons
(Netherlands) Manon Melief	0–4	(Germany) Daniel Schneider
(England) Mark Vincent	w/d–w/o	(England) Ryan Causton
(England) Christopher Keogan	4–2	(Austria) Manuel Pomwenger
(Republic of Ireland) Charlie Sweeney	4–2	(Germany) Kilian Baur-Pantoulier
(Switzerland) Alexander Ursenbacher	4–0	(Germany) Stefan Caspers
(Israel) Dana Amir	0–4	(Austria) Gerry Egger
(Germany) Robin Otto	3–4	(England) Joshua Cooper
(Germany) Sascha Breuer	1–4	(England) Saqib Nasir
(England) Aaron Cook	0–4	(Malta) Alex Borg
(Poland) Kacper Filipiak	4–1	(Germany) Loris Lehmann
(Germany) Patrick Einsle	4–0	(Austria) Rick Kraaijeveld
(Germany) Thomas Blang	0–4	(Republic of Ireland) Tony Corrigan
(England) Chris Norbury	4–1	(Belgium) Tomasz Skalski
(Wales) Jack Bradford	w/d–w/o	(England) Nick Jennings
(Germany) Jürgen Kesseler	2–4	(England) Charlie Walters
(Wales) Jamie Clarke	4–1	(Austria) Andreas Ploner
(Netherlands) Kevin Chan	4–0	(England) Imran Nisar
(England) Adam Edge	4–0	(Germany) Felix Frede
(Germany) Ralph Müller	0–4	(England) Sam Craigie

(England) Ashley Carty	4–0	(Germany) Stefan Schneider
(England) Joe O'Connor	4–0	(Israel) Shachar Ruberg
(England) Thomas Barton	4–2	(Germany) Matthais Porn
(Switzerland) Dennis Furrer	4–2	(Wales) Chris Lloyd
(England) Luke Garland	4–0	(Romania) Corina Maracine
(England) Oliver Brown	2–4	(Scotland) Marc J Davis
(Germany) Simon Lichtenberg	4–0	(Germany) Miro Popovic
(Republic of Ireland) Josh Boileau	4–0	(Germany) Michael Schnabel
(Germany) Markus Fisher	0–4	(Republic of Ireland) Andrew Doherty
(Germany) Thomas Hein	4–1	(England) Matthew Hudson
(England) Adam Duffy	4–1	(Belgium) Hans Blanckaert
(England) Phil O'Kane	4–0	(Germany) Tanja Ender
(Belgium) Steve Lambrechts	0–4	(England) Julian Mills
(Germany) Ronny Pawlitza	0–4	(Poland) Mateusz Baranowski
(France) Stephane Ochoiski	4–1	(Germany) Sascha Lippe
(Germany) Carl Rosenberger	1–4	(Northern Ireland) Conor McCormack
(Germany) Stefan Dohr	0–4	(England) Brandon Sargeant
(Belgium) Wan Chooi Tan	4–1	(Germany) Thomas Kiesewetter
(Netherlands) Laurin Winters	1–4	(Switzerland) Marvin Losi
(Germany) Thomas Frank	w/o–w/d	(Denmark) Ejler Hame
(Germany) Markus Hertle	1–4	(Austria) Paul Schopf
(Belgium) Jurian Heusdens	2–4	(Wales) Thomas Rees
(Germany) Michael Heeger	4–1	(Germany) Pedro Chacon
(Germany) Ralf Günzel	w/o–w/d	(Germany) Norbert Hofheinz
(Germany) Oktay Yildiz	1–4	(England) Ashley Hugill
(England) Robbie Purdham	0–4	(Germany) Lukas Kleckers
(England) Matthew Glasby	0–4	(England) Michael Williams

==== Round 2 ====
Best of 7 frames

(Germany) Stefan Schenk	0–4	(Scotland) Michael Collumb
(Belgium) Ben Mertens	0–4	(Wales) Ben Jones
(England) Adam Longley	4–3	(England) Adamn King
(Germany) Luca Kaufmann	0–4	(Malta) Brian Cini
(Wales) Kishan Hirani	4–0	(Belgium) Jeff Jacobs
(England) Zack Richardson	3–4	(England) Sam Thistlewhite
(England) Scott Lyons	2–4	(Germany) Daniel Schneider
(Wales) Callum Lloyd	0–4	(England) Ryan Causton
(England) Christopher Keogan	4–0	(Republic of Ireland) Charlie Sweeney
(Turkey) Soner Sari	2–4	(Switzerland) Alexander Ursenbacher
(England) Joe Steele	4–1	(Austria) Gerry Egger
(Germany) Sebastian Stein	0–4	(England) Joshua Cooper
(England) Saqib Nasir	0–4	(Malta) Alex Borg
(Belgium) Phuntsok Jaegers	0–4	(Poland) Kacper Filipiak
(Germany) Diana Schuler	0–4	(Germany) Patrick Einsle
(Republic of Ireland) Tony Corrigan	1–4	(England) Chris Norbury
(Wales) Alex Taubman	4–0	(England) Nick Jennings
(England) Damian Wilks	3–4	(England) Charlie Walters
(Wales) Jamie Clarke	4–0	(Netherlands) Kevin Chan
(England) Adam Edge	1–4	(England) Sam Craigie

(England) Ashley Carty	4–1	(England) Joe O'Connor
(Switzerland) Tom Zimmermann	0–4	(England) Thomas Barton
(Germany) Peter Brehm	1–4	(Switzerland) Dennis Furrer
(England) Nico Elton	4–3	(England) Luke Garland
(Scotland) Marc J Davis	4–0	(Germany) Simon Lichtenberg
(Republic of Ireland) Josh Boileau	4–1	(Republic of Ireland) Andrew Doherty
(England) Richard Beckham	4–0	(Germany) Thomas Hein
(England) Jamie Bodle	2–4	(England) Adam Duffy
(Germany) Heiko Mutz	0–4	(England) Phil O'Kane
(England) Julian Mills	1–4	(Poland) Mateusz Baranowski
(Sweden) Ron Florax	0–4	(France) Stephane Ochoiski
(India) Vamsikrishna Yanamandra	0–4	(Northern Ireland) Conor McCormack
(England) Elliot Slessor	4–0	(England) Brandon Sargeant
(Belgium) Wan Chooi Tan	4–2	(Switzerland) Marvin Losi
(Germany) Andreas Hartung	4–1	(Germany) Thomas Frank
(Austria) Paul Schopf	3–4	(Wales) Thomas Rees
(Germany) Anton Woywod	0–4	(Germany) Michael Heeger
(England) Jake Nicholson	4–0	(Germany) Ralf Günzel
(England) Ashley Hugill	4–3	(Germany) Lukas Kleckers
(England) Michael Williams	4–0	(Republic of Ireland) Dessie Sheehan

==== Round 3 ====
Best of 7 frames

(Scotland) Michael Collumb	3–4	(Wales) Ben Jones
(England) Adam Longley	1–4	(Malta) Brian Cini
(Wales) Kishan Hirani	2–4	(England) Sam Thistlewhite
(Germany) Daniel Schneider	1–4	(England) Ryan Causton
(England) Christopher Keogan	4–2	(Switzerland) Alexander Ursenbacher
(England) Joe Steele	3–4	(England) Joshua Cooper
(Malta) Alex Borg	3–4	(Poland) Kacper Filipiak
(Germany) Patrick Einsle	4–1	(England) Chris Norbury
(Wales) Alex Taubman	4–3	(England) Charlie Walters
(Wales) Jamie Clarke	1–4	(England) Sam Craigie

(England) Ashley Carty	4–2	(England) Thomas Barton
(Switzerland) Dennis Furrer	0–4	(England) Nico Elton
(Scotland) Marc J Davis	4–3	(Republic of Ireland) Josh Boileau
(England) Richard Beckham	4–1	(England) Adam Duffy
(England) Phil O'Kane	2–4	(Poland) Mateusz Baranowski
(France) Stephane Ochoiski	4–3	(Northern Ireland) Conor McCormack
(England) Elliot Slessor	4–1	(Belgium) Wan Chooi Tan
(Germany) Andreas Hartung	0–4	(Wales) Thomas Rees
(Germany) Michael Heeger	0–4	(England) Jake Nicholson
(England) Ashley Hugill	4–1	(England) Michael Williams

=== Main rounds ===
==== Top half ====
===== Section 1 =====
Last 128; Best of 7 frames
(England) Barry Hawkins	4
(China) Zhang Yong	2
(England) Kyren Wilson	4
(Wales) Ben Jones	0
(England) Gary Wilson	3
(England) Anthony Hamilton	4
(England) Stuart Bingham	3
(Scotland) John Higgins	4
(England) Mark King	4
(Malta) Brian Cini	0
(Wales) Jamie Jones	4
(England) Sam Thistlewhite	1
(Wales) Lee Walker	4
(England) Sydney Wilson	3
(England) Rory McLeod	3
(Norway) Kurt Maflin	4

Last 64; Best of 7 frames
(England) Barry Hawkins	3
(England) Kyren Wilson	4
(England) Anthony Hamilton	0
(Scotland) John Higgins	4
(England) Mark King	4
(Wales) Jamie Jones	0
(Wales) Lee Walker	4
(Norway) Kurt Maflin	3

Last 32; Best of 7 frames
(England) Kyren Wilson	4
(Scotland) John Higgins	1
(England) Mark King	4
(Wales) Lee Walker	0

Last 16; Best of 7 frames
(England) Kyren Wilson	1
(England) Mark King	4

===== Section 2 =====
Last 128; Best of 7 frames
(Northern Ireland) Mark Allen	3
(England) Sanderson Lam	4
(England) Ian Burns	4
(England) Ryan Causton	3
(Wales) Duane Jones	4
(England) Steven Hallworth	3
(England) Martin O'Donnell	4
(Thailand) Thanawat Tirapongpaiboon	2
(England) Peter Lines	1
(England) Rod Lawler	4
(England) Jack Lisowski	4
(China) Lü Chenwei	1
(Malaysia) Thor Chuan Leong	4
(England) Christopher Keogan	1
(China) Liang Wenbo	4
(Thailand) Noppon Saengkham	1

Last 64; Best of 7 frames
(England) Sanderson Lam	0
(England) Ian Burns	4
(Wales) Duane Jones	3
(England) Martin O'Donnell	4
(England) Rod Lawler	4
(England) Jack Lisowski	3
(Malaysia) Thor Chuan Leong	4
(China) Liang Wenbo	0

Last 32; Best of 7 frames
(England) Ian Burns	4
(England) Martin O'Donnell	2
(England) Rod Lawler	1
(Malaysia) Thor Chuan Leong	4

Last 16; Best of 7 frames
(England) Ian Burns	4
(Malaysia) Thor Chuan Leong	3

===== Section 3 =====
Last 128; Best of 7 frames
(Scotland) Alan McManus	4
(England) Joshua Cooper	0
(England) Mark Davis	4
(England) Paul Davison	3
(Scotland) Eden Sharav	2
(England) Mitchell Mann	4
(England) David Gilbert	4
(Poland) Kacper Filipiak	0
(England) Mike Dunn	4
(Scotland) Ross Muir	1
(Malta) Tony Drago	2
(England) Stuart Carrington	4
(Wales) Matthew Stevens	4
(Germany) Patrick Einsle	1
(Wales) Michael White	w/o
(England) Chris Melling	w/d

Last 64; Best of 7 frames
(Scotland) Alan McManus	2
(England) Mark Davis	4
(England) Mitchell Mann	1
(England) David Gilbert	4
(England) Mike Dunn	2
(England) Stuart Carrington	4
(Wales) Matthew Stevens	4
(Wales) Michael White	1

Last 32; Best of 7 frames
(England) Mark Davis	4
(England) David Gilbert	2
(England) Stuart Carrington	4
(Wales) Matthew Stevens	1

Last 16; Best of 7 frames
(England) Mark Davis	3
(England) Stuart Carrington	4

===== Section 4 =====
Last 128; Best of 7 frames
(England) Shaun Murphy	4
(England) Barry Pinches	0
(England) Zak Surety	4
(China) Zhang Anda	0
(England) Craig Steadman	2
(Scotland) Fraser Patrick	4
(Belgium) Luca Brecel	4
(Wales) Gareth Allen	3
(England) Peter Ebdon	4
(Scotland) Rhys Clark	0
(England) Alfie Burden	4
(Wales) Alex Taubman	0
(England) Robbie Williams	4
(England) Sam Craigie	0
(England) Ben Woollaston	3
(Scotland) Jamie Burnett	4

Last 64; Best of 7 frames
(England) Shaun Murphy	4
(England) Zak Surety	0
(Scotland) Fraser Patrick	1
(Belgium) Luca Brecel	4
(England) Peter Ebdon	2
(England) Alfie Burden	4
(England) Robbie Williams	4
(Scotland) Jamie Burnett	3

Last 32; Best of 7 frames
(England) Shaun Murphy	4
(Belgium) Luca Brecel	2
(England) Alfie Burden	2
(England) Robbie Williams	4

Last 16; Best of 7 frames
(England) Shaun Murphy	4
(England) Robbie Williams	1

==== Bottom half ====
===== Section 5 =====
Last 128; Best of 7 frames
(Scotland) Graeme Dott	w/o
(Australia) Vinnie Calabrese	w/d
(Wales) Dominic Dale	4
(China) Yu Delu	1
(England) Jamie Cope	4
(England) Ashley Carty	3
(England) Robert Milkins	2
(England) Nico Elton	4
(Scotland) Anthony McGill	0
(Wales) Daniel Wells	4
(Republic of Ireland) Fergal O'Brien	0
(China) Xiao Guodong	4
(England) Joe Perry	4
(England) Michael Wasley	0
(England) Judd Trump	4
(Scotland) Marc J Davis	2

Last 64; Best of 7 frames
(Scotland) Graeme Dott	4
(Wales) Dominic Dale	0
(England) Jamie Cope	4
(England) Nico Elton	2
(Wales) Daniel Wells	4
(China) Xiao Guodong	0
(England) Joe Perry	2
(England) Judd Trump	4

Last 32; Best of 7 frames
(Scotland) Graeme Dott	3
(England) Jamie Cope	4
(Wales) Daniel Wells	1
(England) Judd Trump	4

Last 16; Best of 7 frames
(England) Jamie Cope	3
(England) Judd Trump	4

===== Section 6 =====
Last 128; Best of 7 frames
(Republic of Ireland) Ken Doherty	3
(China) Tian Pengfei	4
(England) Michael Georgiou	2
(China) Zhou Yuelong	4
(Scotland) Michael Leslie	1
(Northern Ireland) Joe Swail	4
(England) Sean O'Sullivan	4
(England) Allan Taylor	0
(England) Michael Holt	4
(England) Richard Beckham	0
(Finland) Robin Hull	w/d
(Poland) Mateusz Baranowski	w/o
(England) Andrew Higginson	4
(England) Sam Baird	2
(England) Matthew Selt	4
(China) Lu Ning	3

Last 64; Best of 7 frames
(China) Tian Pengfei	4
(China) Zhou Yuelong	3
(Northern Ireland) Joe Swail	0
(England) Sean O'Sullivan	4
(England) Michael Holt	4
(Poland) Mateusz Baranowski	1
(England) Andrew Higginson	4
(England) Matthew Selt	1

Last 32; Best of 7 frames
(China) Tian Pengfei	2
(England) Sean O'Sullivan	4
(England) Michael Holt	4
(England) Andrew Higginson	2

Last 16; Best of 7 frames
(England) Sean O'Sullivan	0
(England) Michael Holt	4

===== Section 7 =====
Last 128; Best of 7 frames
(Wales) Ryan Day	4
(England) Liam Highfield	2
(Republic of Ireland) David Morris	1
(Hong Kong) Marco Fu	4
(Northern Ireland) Gerard Greene	0
(England) Jimmy Robertson	4
(Scotland) Stephen Maguire	4
(France) Stephane Ochoiski	1
(England) Ali Carter	4
(England) Elliot Slessor	0
(India) Aditya Mehta	4
(England) Ian Glover	2
(England) Jason Weston	w/d
(China) Cao Yupeng	w/o
(England) Oliver Lines	1
(China) Li Hang	4

Last 64; Best of 7 frames
(Wales) Ryan Day	2
(Hong Kong) Marco Fu	4
(England) Jimmy Robertson	4
(Scotland) Stephen Maguire	3
(England) Ali Carter	4
(India) Aditya Mehta	1
(China) Cao Yupeng	0
(China) Li Hang	4

Last 32; Best of 7 frames
(Hong Kong) Marco Fu	2
(England) Jimmy Robertson	4
(England) Ali Carter	4
(China) Li Hang	0

Last 16; Best of 7 frames
(England) Jimmy Robertson	2
(England) Ali Carter	4

===== Section 8 =====
Last 128; Best of 7 frames
(Wales) Mark Williams	4
(Wales) Thomas Rees	0
(England) Chris Wakelin	4
(England) David Grace	1
(England) Joel Walker	w/o
(Iran) Hossein Vafaei	w/d
(England) Ricky Walden	3
(Thailand) Dechawat Poomjaeng	4
(England) Mark Selby	4
(England) Jake Nicholson	1
(Scotland) Scott Donaldson	4
(England) Ashley Hugill	1
(Isle of Man) Darryl Hill	0
(England) Martin Gould	4
(England) Tom Ford	2
(England) James Cahill	4

Last 64; Best of 7 frames
(Wales) Mark Williams	4
(England) Chris Wakelin	2
(England) Joel Walker	1
(Thailand) Dechawat Poomjaeng	4
(England) Mark Selby	2
(Scotland) Scott Donaldson	4
(England) Martin Gould	4
(England) James Cahill	1

Last 32; Best of 7 frames
(Wales) Mark Williams	4
(Thailand) Dechawat Poomjaeng	2
(Scotland) Scott Donaldson	4
(England) Martin Gould	2

Last 16; Best of 7 frames
(Wales) Mark Williams	4
(Scotland) Scott Donaldson	1

==== Finals ====
Quarter-finals; Best of 7 frames		Semi-finals; Best of 7 frames		Final; Best of 7 frames
(England) Mark King	4
(England) Ian Burns	0	(England) Mark King	3
(England) Stuart Carrington	2	(England) Shaun Murphy	4
(England) Shaun Murphy	4			(England) Shaun Murphy	3
(England) Judd Trump	1			(England) Ali Carter	4
(England) Michael Holt	4	(England) Michael Holt	2
(England) Ali Carter	4	(England) Ali Carter	4
(Wales) Mark Williams	2

== Century breaks ==
- 142 – Dechawat Poomjaeng
- 140 – Liang Wenbo
- 136 – Michael Williams
- 131 – Kurt Maflin
- 130, 106, 102 – Judd Trump
- 130 – Stuart Carrington
- 129, 111 – Ashley Carty
- 128 – Peter Ebdon
- 126 – Josh Boileau
- 125, 110 – John Higgins
- 125 – Ashley Hugill
- 124 – Brian Cini
- 123, 123 – Mark King
- 123 – Shaun Murphy
- 122 – Kyren Wilson
- 117, 115 – David Gilbert
- 114 – Jamie Cope
- 112, 105 – Ali Carter
- 110 – Elliot Slessor
- 110 – Chris Norbury
- 108, 107 – Patrick Einsle
- 105 – Ben Woollaston
- 105 – Rod Lawler
- 105 – Mark Williams
- 103 – Ian Burns
- 102 – Dominic Dale
- 100 – Sean O'Sullivan
