= Lukas Kleckers =

German snooker player

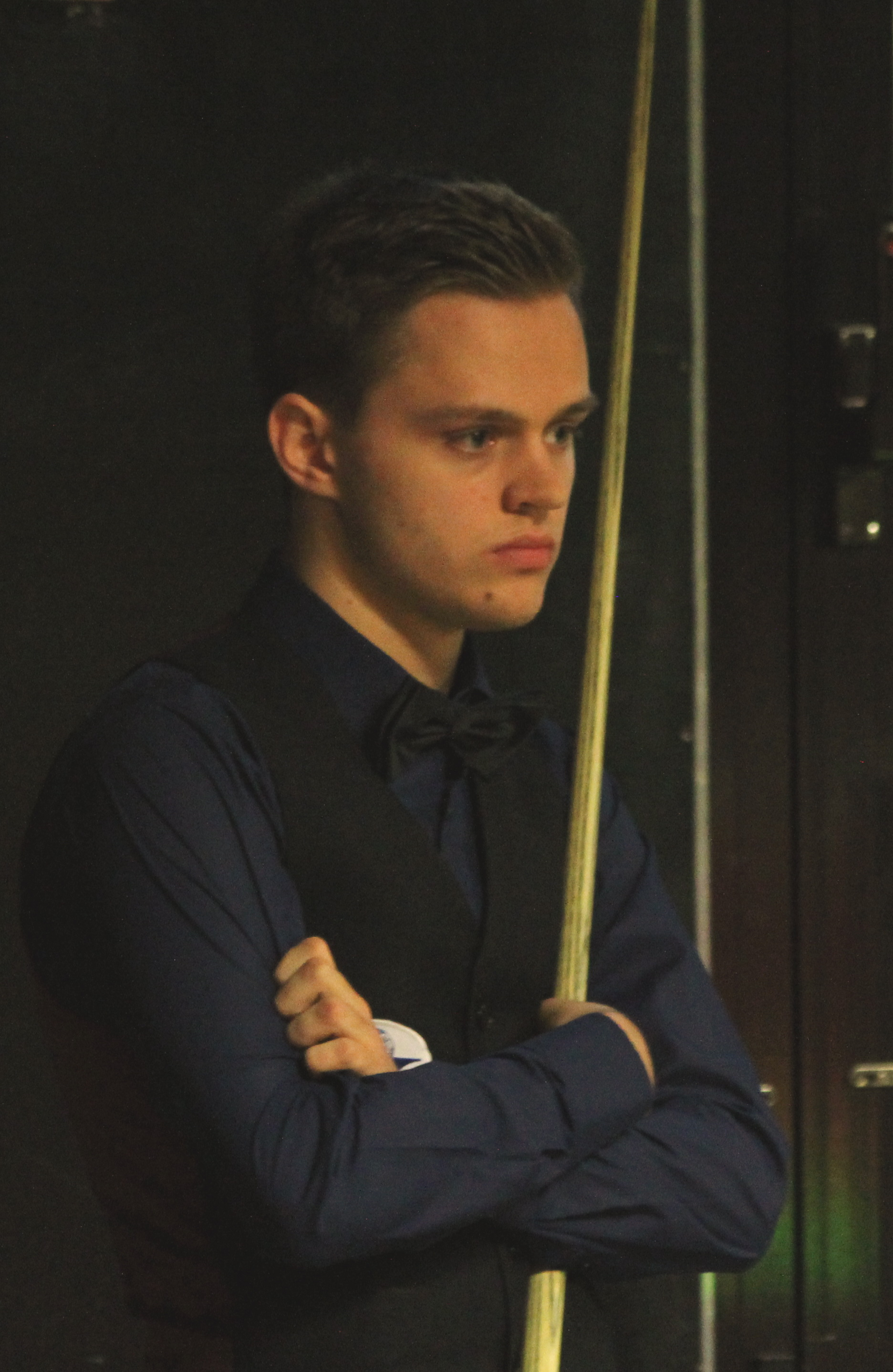
- Paul Hunter Classic 2017

Personal information
- Nickname: The Ruhr-potter
- Born: 18 May 1996 (age 30) Essen, North Rhine

Sport
- Country: Germany
- Sport: Snooker
- Professional: 2017–2019, 2020–2024
- Highest ranking: 76 (August 2021)
- Best ranking finish: Quarter-finals (2023 WST Classic)

Lukas Kleckers (born 18 May 1996 in Essen, North Rhine-Westphalia) is a German former professional snooker player and current commentator on snooker coverage for Eurosport.

== Career ==
Lukas Kleckers first drew attention in 2013 when, at the age of 17, he captured the highest ranking and most prestigious amateur event in Germany by defeating Roman Dietzel 4–2 in the final of the German Amateur Championship. In the next few years he twice played in the qualifying rounds for the World Championship, losing 10–6 to Noppon Saengkham in 2015 and 10–7 to Rory McLeod in 2016. At the 2015 Riga Open he won a match in a European Tour event for the first time by beating Anthony Hamilton 4–0, before losing 4–0 to Stephen Maguire.

Kleckers came through the 2017 Q School by winning six matches including victories over former professionals Adrian Rosa and Martin O'Donnell to earn a two-year card on the World Snooker Tour for the 2017–18 and 2018–19 seasons.

Since falling off the tour after the 2023–24 season, he has worked as a commentator and pundit on snooker coverage for Eurosport.

He also plays team snooker for BC Oberhausen 1 in Germany, a front-runner in the German top-tier Snooker-Bundesliga.

== Performance and rankings timeline ==
Tournament	2014/ 15	2015/ 16	2016/ 17	2017/ 18	2018/ 19	2019/ 20	2020/ 21	2021/ 22	2022/ 23	2023/ 24
Ranking (Note: It shows the ranking at the beginning of the season)	(Note: He was an amateur)			(Note: New players on the Main Tour do not have a ranking)	96		(Note: Players qualified through Challenge Tour began the season without ranking points)	80	(Note: Players qualified through Q School began the season without ranking points)	77
Ranking tournaments
Championship League	Non-Ranking Event						RR	RR	RR	RR
European Masters	Not Held		A	LQ	LQ	LQ	2R	LQ	1R	LQ
British Open	Tournament Not Held							4R	1R	LQ
English Open	Not Held		A	1R	2R	A	1R	LQ	LQ	1R
Wuhan Open	Tournament Not Held									LQ
Northern Ireland Open	Not Held		A	1R	1R	A	3R	LQ	LQ	1R
International Championship	A	A	A	LQ	LQ	A	Not Held			LQ
UK Championship	A	A	A	1R	1R	A	1R	1R	LQ	LQ
Shoot Out	Non-Ranking		A	1R	3R	1R	1R	3R	3R	2R
Scottish Open	Not Held		A	1R	1R	A	1R	LQ	LQ	1R
World Grand Prix	NR	DNQ	DNQ	DNQ	DNQ	DNQ	DNQ	DNQ	DNQ	DNQ
German Masters	A	A	A	LQ	LQ	LQ	LQ	LQ	LQ	LQ
Welsh Open	A	A	A	1R	3R	A	1R	1R	LQ	LQ
Players Championship	DNQ	DNQ	DNQ	DNQ	DNQ	DNQ	DNQ	DNQ	DNQ	DNQ
World Open	Not Held		A	LQ	LQ	A	Not Held			1R
Tour Championship	Tournament Not Held				DNQ	DNQ	DNQ	DNQ	DNQ	DNQ
World Championship	LQ	LQ	A	LQ	LQ	LQ	LQ	LQ	LQ	LQ
Former ranking tournaments
Shanghai Masters	A	A	A	LQ	Non-Ranking		Not Held			NR
Paul Hunter Classic	MR		WD	1R	2R	NR	Tournament Not Held			
Indian Open	A	NH	A	LQ	LQ	Tournament Not Held				
China Open	A	A	A	LQ	LQ	Tournament Not Held				
Riga Masters (Note: The event was called the Riga Open (2014/2015–2015/2016))	MR		A	2R	2R	2R	Tournament Not Held			
China Championship	Not Held		NR	LQ	LQ	A	Tournament Not Held			
WST Pro Series	Tournament Not Held						RR	Not Held		
Turkish Masters	Tournament Not Held							1R	Not Held	
Gibraltar Open	NH	MR	A	1R	1R	A	1R	1R	Not Held	
WST Classic	Tournament Not Held								QF	NH
Former non-ranking tournaments
Haining Open	MR		A	A	2R	A	NH	A	Not Held	
Six-red World Championship	A	A	2R	A	A	A	Not Held		LQ	NH

Performance Table Legend
LQ	lost in the qualifying draw	#R	lost in the early rounds of the tournament (WR = Wildcard round, RR = Round robin)	QF	lost in the quarter-finals
SF	lost in the semi-finals	F	lost in the final	W	won the tournament
DNQ	did not qualify for the tournament	A	did not participate in the tournament	WD	withdrew from the tournament

NH / Not Held	means an event was not held.
NR / Non-Ranking Event	means an event is/was no longer a ranking event.
R / Ranking Event	means an event is/was a ranking event.
MR / Minor-Ranking Event	means an event is/was a minor-ranking event.

== Career finals ==
=== Pro-am finals: 2 (1 title) ===
Outcome	No.	Year	Championship	Opponent in the final	Score
Winner	1.	2018	3 Kings Open	(Austria) Andreas Ploner	5–1
Runner-up	1.	2023	Vienna Snooker Open	(Austria) Florian Nüßle	0–5

=== Amateur finals: 15 (11 titles) ===
Outcome	No.	Year	Championship	Opponent in the final	Score
Runner-up	1.	2011	German Grand Prix - Final	(New Zealand) Chris Mcbreen	2–3
Winner	1.	2013	German Grand Prix - Event 3	(Germany) Roman Dietzel	4–2
Winner	2.	2013	German Championship	(Germany) Roman Dietzel	4–2
Winner	3.	2014	German Grand Prix - Event 1	(Germany) Sascha Lippe	4–3
Winner	4.	2014	German Grand Prix - Event 3	(Germany) Jan Eisenstein	3–1
Runner-up	2.	2014	German Grand Prix - Event 6	(Germany) Roman Dietzel	2–4
Winner	5.	2015	German Grand Prix - Event 1	(Germany) Simon Lichtenberg	4–0
Runner-up	3.	2015	German Grand Prix - Event 2	(Denmark) Rune Kampe	1–3
Winner	6.	2016	German Grand Prix - Event 2	(Austria) Andreas Ploner	3–2
Runner-up	4.	2016	European 6-Reds Championship	(Poland) Mateusz Baranowski	3–4
Winner	7.	2016	German 6-red Championship	(Germany) Robin Otto	4–0
Winner	8.	2019	German 6-red Championship	(Germany) Sascha Breuer	4–2
Winner	9.	2019	German Grand Prix - Event 1	(France) Brian Ochoiski	3–1
Winner	10.	2019	German Championship	(Germany) Robin Otto	4–0
Winner	11.	2020	Challenge Tour – Event 8	(Wales) Tyler Rees	3–1
