= German Amateur Championship (snooker) =

Tournament information
- Country: Germany
- Established: 1997; 29 years ago
- Organisation(s): German Billiard Union
- Format: Amateur event
- Recent edition: 2021
- Current champion: (Germany) Alexander Widau

The German Amateur Championship is an annual snooker competition played in the Germany and is the highest ranking amateur event in Germany.

The competition was established in 1997. Lasse Münstermann and Patrick Einsle are the most successful champions in the tournaments history having both won the competition 3 times. Since 2005 the tournament has been held in Bad Wildungen. The championship is currently held by Alexander Widau.

== Winners ==
Year	Winner	Runner-up	Final score	City
1995	(Germany) Sascha Diemer	(Germany) Michael Heeger	4-0	Hanover
1996	Unknown			
1997	(Germany) Thomas Hein	(Germany) Marcus West	4-3	Unknown
1998	(Germany) Marcus West	(Germany) Thomas Hein	4-0	Duisburg
1999	(Germany) Mike Henson	(Germany) Sascha Diemer	5-0	Unknown
2000	(Germany) Mike Henson	(Germany) Kurt Stock	4–1	Unknown
2001	(Germany) Sascha Diemer	(Germany) Lasse Münstermann	4–2	Bad Wildungen
2002	(Germany) Mike Henson	(Germany) Sascha Lippe	4–3	Unknown
2003	(Germany) Lasse Münstermann	(Germany) Kurt Stock	4–2	Bad Wildungen
2004	(Germany) Lasse Münstermann	(Germany) Sascha Lippe	4–0	Bad Wildungen
2005	(Germany) Itaro Santos	(Germany) Lasse Münstermann	4–0	Bad Wildungen
2006	(Germany) Lasse Münstermann	(Germany) Itaro Santos	4–3	Unknown
2007	(Germany) Sascha Lippe	(Germany) Michael Heeger	4–2	Bad Wildungen
2008	(Germany) Itaro Santos	(Germany) Christian Gabriel	4–0	Bad Wildungen
2009	(Germany) Patrick Einsle	(Germany) Itaro Santos	4–2	Bad Wildungen
2010	(Germany) Stefan Kasper	(Germany) Sascha Lippe	4–1	Bad Wildungen
2011	(Germany) Patrick Einsle	(Germany) Stefan Kasper	4–3	Bad Wildungen
2012	(Germany) Patrick Einsle	(Germany) Roman Dietzel	4–2	Bad Wildungen
2013	(Germany) Lukas Kleckers	(Germany) Roman Dietzel	4–2	Bad Wildungen
2014	(Germany) Roman Dietzel	(Germany) Sascha Breuer	4–2	Bad Wildungen
2015	(Germany) Sascha Lippe	(Germany) Patrick Einsle	4–3	Bad Wildungen
2016	(Germany) Simon Lichtenberg	(Germany) Roman Dietzel	4–2	Bad Wildungen
2017	(Germany) Richard Wienold	(Germany) Roman Dietzel	4–2	Bad Wildungen
2018	(Germany) Michael Schnabel	(Germany) Daniel Sciborski	4–1	Bad Wildungen
2019	(Germany) Lukas Kleckers	(Germany) Robin Otto	4–0	Bad Wildungen
2021	(Germany) Alexander Widau	(Turkey) Soner Sari	4–2	Bad Wildungen
2022	(Germany) Richard Wienold	(Germany) Umut Dikme	4–1	Bad Wildungen
2023	(Germany) Richard Wienold	(Germany) Alexander Widau	4–0	Bad Wildungen
2024	(Germany) Umut Dikme	(Germany) Simon Lichtenberg	4–3	Bad Wildungen
2025	(Germany) Simon Lichtenberg	(Germany) Joel Fandrei	4–3	Bad Wildungen
2026				Bad Wildungen

== Stats ==
=== Finalists ===
Rank	Name	Nationality	Winner	Runner-up	Finals
1	Lasse Münstermann	Germany	3	2	5
2	Patrick Einsle	Germany	3	1	4
3	Sascha Lippe	Germany	2	3	4
4	Itaro Santos	Germany	2	2	4
5	Marcus West	Germany	2	1	3
6	Mike Henson	Germany	2	0	2
6	Lukas Kleckers	Germany	2	0	2
6	Richard Wienold	Germany	2	0	2
9	Roman Dietzel	Germany	1	3	4
10	Thomas Hein	Germany	1	1	2
10	Stefan Kasper	Germany	1	1	2
10	Alexander Widau	Germany	1	1	2
10	Simon Lichtenberg	Germany	1	1	2
14	Sascha Diemer	Germany	1	0	1
14	Umut Dikme	Germany	1	0	1
14	Michael Schnabel	Germany	1	0	1
17	Kurt Stock	Germany	0	3	3
18	Michael Heeger	Germany	0	1	1
18	Christian Gabriel	Germany	0	1	1
18	Sascha Breuer	Germany	0	1	1
18	Daniel Sciborski	Germany	0	1	1
18	Robin Otto	Germany	0	1	1
18	Joel Fandrei	Germany	0	1	1
18	Soner Sari	(Turkey) Türkiye	0	1	1
