= Snooker-Bundesliga =

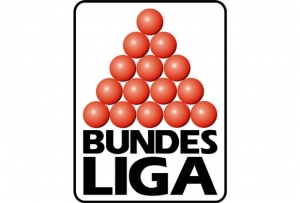

Tournament information
- Country: Germany
- Established: 1998
- Organisation(s): DBU
- Format: Pro-am team event
- Current champion: 1. SC Mayen-Koblenz

The Snooker-Bundesliga (German: 1. Bundesliga Snooker) is the highest level of the league system for team snooker in Germany, organised by the German Billiards Union. Created in 1998, the league features eight teams of five players representing their region against other such teams. Being the top of the domestic snooker pyramid, three teams are relegated each season to the 2nd Bundesliga.

A matchday consists of eight snooker matches in best-of-five format.

== Winners ==
With a total of seven German championship titles, the Billard Sportverein Wuppertal 1929 (BSV Wuppertal for short), which was known as BBF Wuppertal (Barmer Billardfreunde Wuppertal) until 2011, is the record champion.

- 1999: PSV Duisburg
- 2000: 1st SC Breakers Rüsselsheim
- 2001: PSC Kaufbeuren
- 2002: PSC Kaufbeuren
- 2003: BBF Wuppertal
- 2004: BSC Füssen
- 2005: PSC Kaufbeuren
- 2006: 1. Berliner SV
- 2007: 1st SC Breakers Rüsselsheim
- 2008: BBF Wuppertal
- 2009: BBF Wuppertal
- 2010: BBF Wuppertal
- 2011: BBF Wuppertal
- 2012: BBF Wuppertal
- 2013: BSV Wuppertal 1929 (previously BBF Wuppertal)
- 2014: BC Stuttgart 1891
- 2015: 1st DSC Hannover
- 2016: SC 147 Essen
- 2017: BC Stuttgart 1891
- 2018: 1. SC Mayen-Koblenz
- 2019: 1. SC Mayen-Koblenz
- 2020: TSG Heilbronn
- 2021: not held due to the COVID-19 pandemic
- 2022: TSG Heilbronn
- 2023: 1. SC Mayen-Koblenz
- 2024: 1. SC Mayen-Koblenz
- 2025: 1. SC Mayen-Koblenz

== Players ==
Former and current notable players within the tournament include:

- Nigel Bond (ENG)
- Ken Doherty (IRL)
- Lukas Kleckers (GER)
- Julien Leclercq (BEL)
