= 2018 Paul Hunter Classic =

Paul Hunter Classic

Tournament information
- Dates: 22–26 August 2018
- Venue: Stadthalle
- City: Fürth
- Country: Germany
- Organisation: World Snooker
- Format: Ranking event
- Total prize fund: £100,000
- Winner's share: £20,000
- Highest break: Michael Georgiou (CYP) (147); Jamie Jones (WAL) (147)

Final
- Champion: Kyren Wilson (ENG)
- Runner-up: Peter Ebdon (ENG)
- Score: 4–2

Location in Germany

The 2018 Paul Hunter Classic was a professional ranking snooker tournament that took place in August 2018 at the Stadthalle in Fürth, Germany. It was the third ranking event of the 2018/2019 season. The tournament is named in honour of former snooker professional, Paul Hunter.

Michael White was the defending champion; however he lost 1–4 to Zhang Anda in the last 32.

Kyren Wilson won his second ranking tournament, beating Peter Ebdon 4–2 in the final after Ebdon had taken a two-frame lead. Ebdon reached his 18th ranking final at the age of 47 a day before his birthday. It was his first ranking final since 2012. He was the oldest player to reach a ranking event final since 48-year-old Steve Davis reached the final of the 2005 UK Championship.

Michael Georgiou made the 140th official maximum break in the third frame of his last 128 match against Umut Dikme. It was Georgiou's first professional maximum break. Later on the same day Jamie Jones made the 141st official maximum break in the third frame of his last 64 match against Lee Walker. It was also Jones' first professional maximum break.

13 year old amateur Ben Mertens made his debut at a professional ranking tournament with a 4–1 win over Adam Stefanow. He then exited the tournament in the second round.

== Prize fund ==
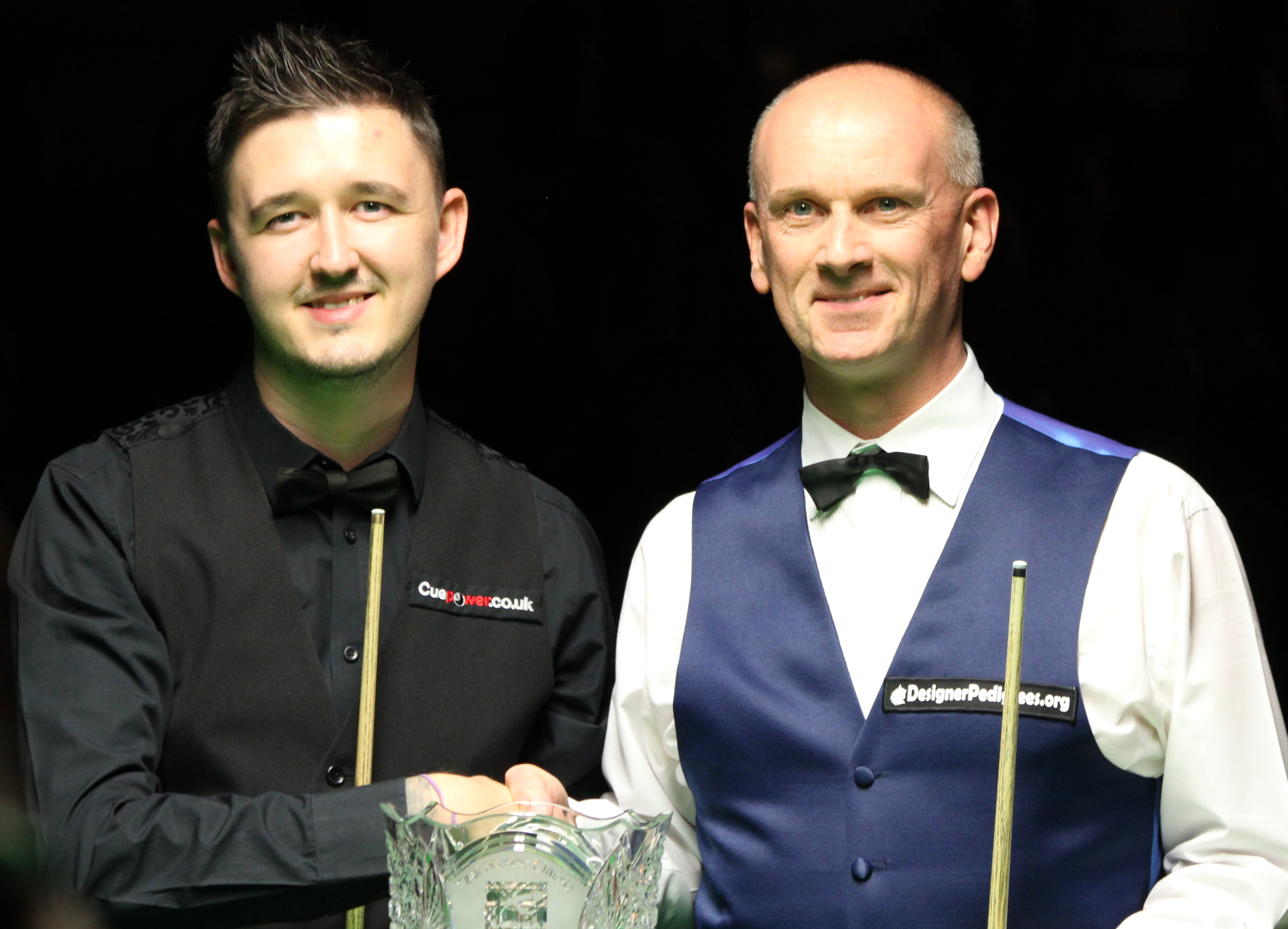
Finalists

The breakdown of prize money for this year is shown below:

- Winner: £20,000
- Runner up: £10,000
- Semifinals: £4,500
- Quarterfinals: £3,000
- Last 16: £1,725
- Last 32: £1,000
- Last 64: £600
- Total: £100,000

The "rolling 147 prize" for a maximum break stood at £20,000, and was split by both Michael Georgiou, in the last 128 round against Umut Dikme, and Jamie Jones in his last 64 match against Lee Walker. This was both players' first maximum break.

== Main rounds ==
Played from 24 to 26 August 2018. All matches were the best of 7 frames.

=== Top half ===
==== Section 1 ====
Last 128; Best of 7 frames
(Wales) Michael White | 4
(Malaysia) Thor Chuan Leong | 2
(England) Rory McLeod | 0
(England) Allan Taylor | 4
(China) Zhang Anda | 4
(England) George Pragnall | 3
(Wales) Dominic Dale | 4
(Brazil) Itaro Santos | 0
(England) Mark Joyce | 4
(England) Michael Wild | 3
(England) Sean O'Sullivan | 0
(Malta) Brian Cini | 4
(Switzerland) Alexander Ursenbacher | 4
(England) Barry Pinches | 0
(China) Fan Zhengyi | w/d
(England) Harvey Chandler | w/o

Last 64; Best of 7 frames
(Wales) Michael White | 4
(England) Allan Taylor | 2
(China) Zhang Anda | 4
(Wales) Dominic Dale | 2
(England) Mark Joyce | 4
(Malta) Brian Cini | 2
(Switzerland) Alexander Ursenbacher | 1
(England) Harvey Chandler | 4

Last 32; Best of 7 frames
(Wales) Michael White | 1
(China) Zhang Anda | 4
(England) Mark Joyce | 0
(England) Harvey Chandler | 4

Last 16; Best of 7 frames
(China) Zhang Anda | 4
(England) Harvey Chandler | 0

==== Section 2 ====
Last 128; Best of 7 frames
(England) Sam Baird | 4
(Belgium) Kevin Van Hove | 2
(Hong Kong) Andy Lee | 3
(England) Reggie Edwards | 4
(England) Ian Burns | 4
(England) Oliver Brown | 0
(China) Zhou Yuelong | 0
(Wales) Jackson Page | 4
(China) Niu Zhuang | 4
(England) James Cahill | 1
(Scotland) Scott Donaldson | 4
(England) Sam Craigie | 2
(Scotland) Ross Muir | 4
(Germany) Patrick Einsle | 1
(England) Tom Ford | 4
(England) Luke Pinches | 0

Last 64; Best of 7 frames
(England) Sam Baird | 4
(England) Reggie Edwards | 0
(England) Ian Burns | 1
(Wales) Jackson Page | 4
(China) Niu Zhuang | 3
(Scotland) Scott Donaldson | 4
(Scotland) Ross Muir | 2
(England) Tom Ford | 4

Last 32; Best of 7 frames
(England) Sam Baird | 3
(Wales) Jackson Page | 4
(Scotland) Scott Donaldson | 4
(England) Tom Ford | 3

Last 16; Best of 7 frames
(Wales) Jackson Page | 2
(Scotland) Scott Donaldson | 4

==== Section 3 ====
Last 128; Best of 7 frames
(England) Mark King | 4
(England) Martin O'Donnell | 3
(England) Stuart Carrington | w/d
(Wales) Jack Bradford | w/o
(England) Peter Ebdon | 4
(Wales) Ben Jones | 0
(Egypt) Basem Eltahhan | 2
(Austria) Andreas Ploner | 4
(England) Ben Woollaston | 4
(Wales) Alex Taubman | 2
(Thailand) Thepchaiya Un-Nooh | 4
(Norway) Christopher Watts | 0
(Cyprus) Michael Georgiou | 4
(Germany) Umut Dikme | 2
(England) Elliot Slessor | 3
(China) Zhang Yong | 4

Last 64; Best of 7 frames
(England) Mark King | 4
(Wales) Jack Bradford | 2
(England) Peter Ebdon | 4
(Austria) Andreas Ploner | 0
(England) Ben Woollaston | 1
(Thailand) Thepchaiya Un-Nooh | 4
(Cyprus) Michael Georgiou | 3
(China) Zhang Yong | 4

Last 32; Best of 7 frames
(England) Mark King | 2
(England) Peter Ebdon | 4
(Thailand) Thepchaiya Un-Nooh | 4
(China) Zhang Yong | 2

Last 16; Best of 7 frames
(England) Peter Ebdon | 4
(Thailand) Thepchaiya Un-Nooh | 0

==== Section 4 ====
Last 128; Best of 7 frames
(England) Craig Steadman | 4
(England) Oliver Lines | 1
(Wales) Kishan Hirani | 4
(Wales) Jamie Clarke | 3
(Wales) Lee Walker | 4
(France) Regis D'Anna | 0
(Wales) Jamie Jones | 4
(England) Nigel Bond | 0
(England) Chris Wakelin | 4
(England) Luke Simmonds | 1
(Germany) Stefan Joachim | 0
(Malta) Aaron Busuttil | 4
(China) Chen Zifan | 4
(Malta) Duncan Bezzina | 0
(Belgium) Luca Brecel | 4
(England) Curtis Daher | 0

Last 64; Best of 7 frames
(England) Craig Steadman | 4
(Wales) Kishan Hirani | 0
(Wales) Lee Walker | 4
(Wales) Jamie Jones | 2
(England) Chris Wakelin | 4
(Malta) Aaron Busuttil | 2
(China) Chen Zifan | 1
(Belgium) Luca Brecel | 4

Last 32; Best of 7 frames
(England) Craig Steadman | 3
(Wales) Lee Walker | 4
(England) Chris Wakelin | 4
(Belgium) Luca Brecel | 2

Last 16; Best of 7 frames
(Wales) Lee Walker | 4
(England) Chris Wakelin | 2

=== Bottom half ===
==== Section 5 ====
Last 128; Best of 7 frames
(England) Kyren Wilson | 4
(China) Chen Feilong | 2
(England) Ashley Carty | 3
(England) Jake Nicholson | 4
(England) Liam Highfield | 4
(Ukraine) Sergey Isaenko | 0
(Germany) Kilian Baur-Pantoulier | 0
(England) Ryan Davies | 4
(England) Gary Wilson | 4
(England) John Astley | 2
(Northern Ireland) Jordan Brown | 4
(Malta) Philip Ciantar | 1
(England) Hammad Miah | 4
(Belgium) Jurian Heusdens | 1
(Northern Ireland) Gerard Greene | 4
(Turkey) Soner Sari | 0

Last 64; Best of 7 frames
(England) Kyren Wilson | 4
(England) Jake Nicholson | 0
(England) Liam Highfield | 4
(England) Ryan Davies | 1
(England) Gary Wilson | 0
(Northern Ireland) Jordan Brown | 4
(England) Hammad Miah | 4
(Northern Ireland) Gerard Greene | 2

Last 32; Best of 7 frames
(England) Kyren Wilson | 4
(England) Liam Highfield | 0
(Northern Ireland) Jordan Brown | 2
(England) Hammad Miah | 4

Last 16; Best of 7 frames
(England) Kyren Wilson | 4
(England) Hammad Miah | 1

==== Section 6 ====
Last 128; Best of 7 frames
(England) Matthew Selt | 4
(Switzerland) Vetter Luis | 3
(England) Joe O'Connor | 4
(Thailand) Sompol Saetang | 0
(Wales) Daniel Wells | 4
(Germany) Juergen Kesseler | 0
(England) Robert Milkins | 4
(England) Sanderson Lam | 2
(Poland) Adam Stefanow | 1
(Belgium) Ben Mertens | 4
(England) Andrew Higginson | 4
(France) Fabian Monnin | 1
(England) Billy Joe Castle | 4
(Ukraine) Iulian Boiko | 1
(China) Xiao Guodong | w/o
(China) Yuan Sijun | w/d

Last 64; Best of 7 frames
(England) Matthew Selt | 3
(England) Joe O'Connor | 4
(Wales) Daniel Wells | 4
(England) Robert Milkins | 3
(Belgium) Ben Mertens | 0
(England) Andrew Higginson | 4
(England) Billy Joe Castle | 4
(China) Xiao Guodong | 3

Last 32; Best of 7 frames
(England) Joe O'Connor | 3
(Wales) Daniel Wells | 4
(England) Andrew Higginson | 3
(England) Billy Joe Castle | 4

Last 16; Best of 7 frames
(Wales) Daniel Wells | 4
(England) Billy Joe Castle | 2

==== Section 7 ====
Last 128; Best of 7 frames
(England) Jack Lisowski | 4
(Wales) Dylan Emery | 0
(China) Zhang Jiankang | 4
(Germany) Felix Frede | 3
(China) Lu Ning | 4
(Wales) Daniel Williams | 1
(Israel) Eden Sharav | 4
(Poland) Daniel Holoyda | 1
(England) Jimmy Robertson | w/o
(Scotland) Chris Totten | w/d
(Northern Ireland) Joe Swail | 4
(England) Paul Davison | 1
(England) Rod Lawler | 4
(Austria) Florian Nüßle | 0
(Germany) Lukas Kleckers | 4
(Hong Kong) Ng On-yee | 1

Last 64; Best of 7 frames
(England) Jack Lisowski | 4
(China) Zhang Jiankang | 0
(China) Lu Ning | 4
(Israel) Eden Sharav | 0
(England) Jimmy Robertson | 4
(Northern Ireland) Joe Swail | 1
(England) Rod Lawler | 4
(Germany) Lukas Kleckers | 3

Last 32; Best of 7 frames
(England) Jack Lisowski | 4
(China) Lu Ning | 3
(England) Jimmy Robertson | 4
(England) Rod Lawler | 3

Last 16; Best of 7 frames
(England) Jack Lisowski | 4
(England) Jimmy Robertson | 0

==== Section 8 ====
Last 128; Best of 7 frames
(England) Alfie Burden | 4
(Poland) Marcin Nitschke | 3
(Germany) Simon Lichtenberg | 4
(England) Wayne Brown | 3
(England) Ashley Hugill | 1
(Wales) Andrew Pagett | 4
(England) Mark Davis | 4
(Germany) Markus Hertle | 0
(Norway) Kurt Maflin | 4
(England) David Grace | 2
(England) Peter Lines | 4
(Hong Kong) Yun Fung Tam | 1
(Thailand) Noppon Saengkham | 4
(England) Robbie Williams | 2
(England) Shaun Murphy | 2
(Republic of Ireland) Fergal O'Brien | 4

Last 64; Best of 7 frames
(England) Alfie Burden | 4
(Germany) Simon Lichtenberg | 1
(Wales) Andrew Pagett | 2
(England) Mark Davis | 4
(Norway) Kurt Maflin | 1
(England) Peter Lines | 4
(Thailand) Noppon Saengkham | 4
(Republic of Ireland) Fergal O'Brien | 1

Last 32; Best of 7 frames
(England) Alfie Burden | 2
(England) Mark Davis | 4
(England) Peter Lines | 4
(Thailand) Noppon Saengkham | 2

Last 16; Best of 7 frames
(England) Mark Davis | 2
(England) Peter Lines | 4

=== Finals ===
Quarter-finals; Best of 7 frames
(China) Zhang Anda | 3
(Scotland) Scott Donaldson | 4
(England) Peter Ebdon | 4
(Wales) Lee Walker | 1
(England) Kyren Wilson | 4
(Wales) Daniel Wells | 3
(England) Jack Lisowski | 3
(England) Peter Lines | 4

Semi-finals; Best of 7 frames
(Scotland) Scott Donaldson | 1
(England) Peter Ebdon | 4
(England) Kyren Wilson | 4
(England) Peter Lines | 3

Final; Best of 7 frames
(England) Peter Ebdon | 2
(England) Kyren Wilson | 4

== Final ==
Final: Best of 7 frames. Referee: Luise Kraatz. Stadthalle, Fürth, Germany, 26 August 2018.
| Peter Ebdon; England | 2–4 | Kyren Wilson; England |
54–20, 66–18, 49–60, 4–127 (120), 23–67, 5–125
| 66 | Highest break | 120 |
| 0 | Century breaks | 1 |

== Amateur pre-qualifying ==
These matches were played in Fürth on 22–23 August 2018. All matches were the best of 7 frames.

=== Round 1 ===
| (Germany) Julian Maschmeier | 0–4 | (England) Jamie O'Neill |
| (Germany) Nirek Kaltenborn | w/d–w/o | (Denmark) Hussam Al-Saffar |
| (England) Michael Wild | 4–1 | (Germany) Davut Dikme |
| (Belgium) Johny Moermans | 2–4 | (Poland) Antoni Kowalski |
| (England) Louis Wakelin | 2–4 | (England) Matthew Glasby |
| (Belgium) Kevin Van Hove | 4–0 | (Germany) Daniel Schneider |
| (Afghanistan) Abdullah Atmar Ghulam Jilani | 0–4 | (Poland) Mateusz Baranowski |
| (England) Callum Beresford | 4–1 | (Germany) Robin Otto |
| (England) James Cahill | 4–1 | (Wales) Conor Caniff |
| (Germany) Michael Heeger | 0–4 | (Germany) Patrick Einsle |
| (Germany) Luis Chacon | 0–4 | (England) Luke Pinches |
| (England) Michael Spooner | 0–4 | (Wales) Jack Bradford |
| (Wales) Ben Jones | 4–0 | (Czech Republic) Ján Chren |
| (Belgium) Tomasz Skalski | 3–4 | (England) Daniel Womersley |
| (Thailand) Nutcharut Wongharuthai | 4–0 | (Germany) Enes Bakirci |
| (Belgium) Gert Kempenaers | 4–1 | (Germany) Norbert Hofheinz |
| (Israel) Ron Kantor | w/o–w/d | (Wales) Tyler Rees |
| (England) Luke Simmonds | 4–0 | (Germany) Luca Kaufmann |
| (England) Dale Prime | 1–4 | (Malta) Aaron Busuttil |
| (England) Sean Maddocks | 4–1 | (Germany) Joerg Petersen |
| (Germany) Nicolai Gebhardt | 1–4 | (England) Curtis Daher |
| (Pakistan) Umar Ali Shaikh | 0–4 | (Hong Kong) Cheung Ka Wai |
| (Ukraine) Sergey Isaenko | 4–1 | (France) Stephane Ochoiski |
| (England) Ryan Davies | 4–0 | (England) Shahidul Islam |
| (Syria) Karam Fatima | 2–4 | (Malta) Philip Ciantar |
| (Hungary) Zsolt Fenyvesi | 1–4 | (Belgium) Jurian Heusdens |
| (Turkey) Soner Sari | 4–0 | (Germany) Georg Schoder |
| (Germany) Ronny Buchholz | w/d–w/o | (Switzerland) Vetter Luis |
| (Bulgaria) Boris Lazarkov | 1–4 | (Germany) Horst Bendig |
| (Belgium) Tan Wang Chooi | 3–4 | (Germany) Juergen Kesseler |
| (Belgium) Ben Mertens | 4–1 | (Switzerland) Marvin Losi |
| (Germany) Pedro Chacon | 0–4 | (France) Fabian Monnin |
| (Switzerland) Tom Zimmermann | 0–4 | (Wales) Dylan Emery |
| (England) Patrick Whelan | 4–0 | (Germany) Andreas Hartung |
| (Thailand) Dechawat Poomjaeng | w/d–w/o | (Wales) Daniel Williams |
| (Poland) Daniel Holoyda | 4–2 | (Germany) Fabian Haken |
| (England) Jamie Curtis-Barrett | 0–4 | (Austria) Florian Nüßle |
| (Hong Kong) Ng On-yee | 4–0 | (England) Paul Thompson |
| (Poland) Marcin Nitschke | 4–0 | (Germany) Christian Oehmicke |
| (Wales) Matthew Roberts | 4–1 | (Germany) Bernd Strnad |
| (Wales) Andrew Pagett | 4–0 | (Poland) Paweł Rogoza |
| (Germany) Ralf Guenzel | 1–4 | (Germany) Markus Hertle |
| (England) David Grace | 4–0 | (England) John Nicholson |
| (Hong Kong) Yun Fung Tam | 4–0 | (Scotland) Abid Manzoor |

=== Round 2 ===
| (England) George Pragnall | 4–3 | (England) Jamie O'Neill |
| (Brazil) Itaro Santos | 4–1 | (Denmark) Hussam Al-Saffar |
| (Germany) Loris Lehmann | 0–4 | (England) Michael Wild |
| (Malta) Brian Cini | 4–2 | (Poland) Antoni Kowalski |
| (England) Barry Pinches | 4–3 | (England) Matthew Glasby |
| (Finland) Heikki Niva | 3–4 | (Belgium) Kevin Van Hove |
| (England) Reggie Edwards | 4–3 | (Poland) Mateusz Baranowski |
| (England) Oliver Brown | 4–2 | (England) Callum Beresford |
| (Germany) Thomas Cesal | 0–4 | (Wales) Jackson Page |
| (England) Charlie Walters | 2–4 | (England) James Cahill |
| (England) Jenson Kendrick | 1–4 | (Germany) Patrick Einsle |
| (Belgium) Kevin Vandevoort | 3–4 | (England) Luke Pinches |
| (Poland) Bartosz Utkowski | 0–4 | (Wales) Jack Bradford |
| (Germany) Markus Fischer | 0–4 | (Wales) Ben Jones |
| (Germany) Achim Belzl | 0–4 | (Austria) Andreas Ploner |
| (Wales) Alex Taubman | 4–0 | (England) Daniel Womersley |
| (Norway) Christopher Watts | 4–1 | (Thailand) Nutcharut Wongharuthai |
| (Germany) Umut Dikme | 4–0 | (Belgium) Gert Kempenaers |
| (France) Regis D'Anna | 4–0 | (Israel) Ron Kantor |
| (Germany) Stefan Gerst | 0–4 | (England) Luke Simmonds |
| (France) Brian Ochoiski | 3–4 | (Malta) Aaron Busuttil |
| (Malta) Duncan Bezzina | 4–2 | (England) Sean Maddocks |
| (Austria) Ebrahim Baghi | 2–4 | (England) Curtis Daher |
| (England) Jake Nicholson | 4–0 | (Hong Kong) Cheung Ka Wai |
| (Germany) Carl Rosenberger | 0–4 | (Ukraine) Sergey Isaenko |
| (England) Peter Devlin | 3–4 | (England) Ryan Davies |
| (England) Phil O'Kane | w/d–w/o | (Malta) Philip Ciantar |
| (Northern Ireland) Billy Ginn | 2–4 | (Belgium) Jurian Heusdens |
| (Bosnia and Herzegovina) Mario-Željo Miloševic | 1–4 | (Turkey) Soner Sari |
| (Republic of Ireland) Paul Ludden | 0–4 | (Switzerland) Vetter Luis |
| (Thailand) Sompol Saetang | 4–0 | (Germany) Horst Bendig |
| (Germany) Smolka Dietmar | 0–4 | (Germany) Juergen Kesseler |
| (Czech Republic) Jan Matejícek | 0–4 | (Belgium) Ben Mertens |
| (England) Bhavesh Sodha | 0–4 | (France) Fabian Monnin |
| (Ukraine) Iulian Boiko | 4–2 | (England) Brandon Sargeant |
| (Republic of Ireland) Tony Corrigan | 1–4 | (Wales) Dylan Emery |
| (Germany) Felix Frede | 4–3 | (England) Patrick Whelan |
| (Germany) David Elahi | 0–4 | (Wales) Daniel Williams |
| (Germany) Tanja Ender | 0–4 | (Poland) Daniel Holoyda |
| (Germany) Richard Wienold | 0–4 | (Austria) Florian Nüßle |
| (Austria) Paul Schopf | 2–4 | (Hong Kong) Ng On-yee |
| (Turkey) Ismail Türker | 0–4 | (Poland) Marcin Nitschke |
| (England) Wayne Brown | 4–1 | (Wales) Matthew Roberts |
| (England) James Budd | 0–4 | (Wales) Andrew Pagett |
| (Germany) Thomas Blang | 0–4 | (Germany) Markus Hertle |
| (Germany) Rolf Mahr | 0–4 | (England) David Grace |
| (Germany) Tom Egger | 0–4 | (Hong Kong) Yun Fung Tam |

== Century breaks ==
=== Main rounds centuries ===
Total: 43

- 147 – Michael Georgiou
- 147 – Jamie Jones
- 144, 125, 116, 104, 101 – Chris Wakelin
- 143 – Thepchaiya Un-Nooh
- 141 – Jackson Page
- 137, 102 – Jack Lisowski
- 134, 106 – Lee Walker
- 129 – Eden Sharav
- 123, 100 – Luca Brecel
- 120, 111 – Kyren Wilson
- 115, 103 – Liam Highfield
- 113, 107 – Scott Donaldson
- 110 – Peter Ebdon
- 109, 108, 108 – Zhang Yong
- 109, 107, 101 – Mark Davis
- 108 – Gary Wilson
- 107 – Fergal O'Brien
- 106, 100 – Rod Lawler
- 106 – Shaun Murphy
- 105 – Tom Ford
- 105 – Noppon Saengkham
- 104 – Harvey Chandler
- 104 – Kurt Maflin
- 102 – Peter Lines
- 101 – Dominic Dale
- 101 – Andrew Higginson
- 101 – Jimmy Robertson
- 100 – Sam Baird

=== Amateur pre-qualifying centuries ===
Total: 6

- 131, 100 – David Grace
- 104, 100 – Dylan Emery
- 102 – Charlie Walters
- 101 – Andrew Pagett
