= 2007 Paul Hunter Classic =

Tournament information
- Dates: 23–26 August 2007
- Venue: Stadthalle
- City: Fürth
- Country: Germany
- Format: Pro–am event
- Total prize fund: €15,000
- Winner's share: €4,000
- Highest break: Mark Davis (ENG) (145)

Final
- Champion: (England) Barry Pinches
- Runner-up: (Republic of Ireland) Ken Doherty
- Score: 4–0

The 2007 Paul Hunter Classic was a pro–am snooker tournament that took place between 23 and 26 August 2007. After two years as the Fürth German Open, this was the first time the tournament was played under the name of Paul Hunter Classic, in memory of the late player Paul Hunter.

The tournament was won by Barry Pinches, who defeated Ken Doherty 4–0 in the final.

== Main draw ==
Last 32; Best of 7 frames
(England) Michael Holt	3
(Malta) Tony Drago	1
(England) Jamie Cope	3
(Republic of Ireland) Joe Delaney	0
(Wales) Lee Walker	1
(England) Matthew Selt	3
(England) Steve Davis	2
(Republic of Ireland) Fergal O'Brien	3
(Scotland) Stephen Maguire	3
(Belgium) Kevin van Hove	0
(England) Joe Perry	1
(Republic of Ireland) Michael Judge	3
(England) Barry Hawkins	3
(England) Munraj Pal	0
(Australia) Neil Robertson	0
(England) Barry Pinches	3
(Republic of Ireland) Ken Doherty	3
(England) Michael Wild	2
(Wales) Dominic Dale	2
(England) Dave Harold	3
(England) Mark Selby	3
(England) Tom Ford	1
(Northern Ireland) Joe Swail	3
(England) David Gray	2
(England) Jimmy White	3
(Wales) Phillip Williams	2
(Wales) Ryan Day	3
(England) Ricky Walden	2
(England) Mark King	0
(England) Ian McCulloch	3
(England) Shaun Murphy	3
(Germany) Patrick Einsle	0

Last 16; Best of 7 frames
(England) Michael Holt	1
(England) Jamie Cope	3
(England) Matthew Selt	1
(Republic of Ireland) Fergal O'Brien	3
(Scotland) Stephen Maguire	1
(Republic of Ireland) Michael Judge	3
(England) Barry Hawkins	1
(England) Barry Pinches	3
(Republic of Ireland) Ken Doherty	3
(England) Dave Harold	1
(England) Mark Selby	0
(Northern Ireland) Joe Swail	3
(England) Jimmy White	0
(Wales) Ryan Day	3
(England) Ian McCulloch	3
(England) Shaun Murphy	0

Quarter-finals; Best of 7 frames
(England) Jamie Cope	0
(Republic of Ireland) Fergal O'Brien	3
(Republic of Ireland) Michael Judge	0
(England) Barry Pinches	3
(Republic of Ireland) Ken Doherty	3
(Northern Ireland) Joe Swail	2
(Wales) Ryan Day	1
(England) Ian McCulloch	3

Semi-finals; Best of 7 frames
(Republic of Ireland) Fergal O'Brien	2
(England) Barry Pinches	3
(Republic of Ireland) Ken Doherty	3
(England) Ian McCulloch	2

Final; Best of 7 frames
(England) Barry Pinches	4
(Republic of Ireland) Ken Doherty	0
