= Patrick Einsle =

German snooker player (born 1987)

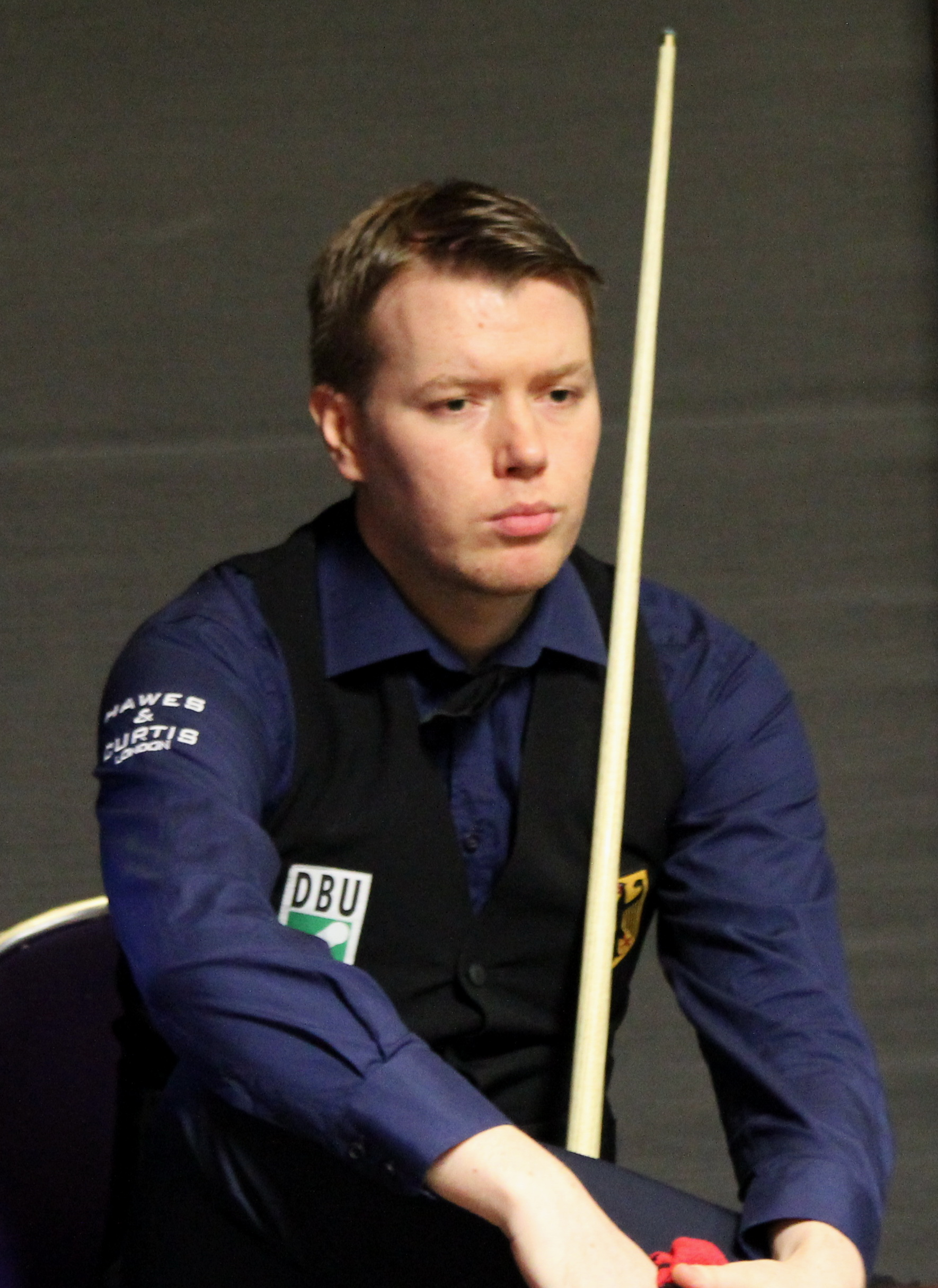
- Paul Hunter Classic 2016

Personal information
- Born: April 22, 1987 (age 39) Füssen, Bavaria

Sport
- Country: Germany
- Sport: Snooker
- Professional: 2006/2007, 2010/2011, 2013/2014
- Highest ranking: 80 (September 2010)

Patrick Einsle (born 22 April 1987 in Füssen, Bavaria) is a former German professional snooker player.

== Career ==
=== Early years ===
In 1998, at the age of 11, Einsle began to play snooker. He made his first century break at the age of 14.

He participated at the 2005 World Games in snooker, but failed in the first round 1–3 to the eventual gold medallist Gerard Greene. At the 2006 Fürth German Open Einsle won against Fergal O'Brien and Stephen Lee and lost only 2–3 in the quarter-finals to the eventual finalist Barry Hawkins.

=== 2006/2007 season ===
Einsle turned professional in 2006–07, after receiving a Main Tour wildcard from the WPBSA following the withdrawal of Paul Hunter. He dropped off the tour after the same season.

Einsle had his first qualification match on the Main Tour only three days after his appeal, he lost in the qualifying round of the Northern Ireland Trophy clearly with 0–5 against Lee Page. At the Grand Prix he survived the first two qualification rounds and was able to collect some points for the snooker world rankings. His third qualification match for the Malta, he lost with 4:5 against Mark Joyce.

In the qualifying for the Masters he lost in the first round 1–4 against Chris Norbury. He also lost in the first qualifying rounds of the UK Championship, the Welsh Open, the China Open and the World Championship, as he was defeated by 9–0 Judd Trump, 5–1 by Lee Spick, 2–5 by Andrew Higginson and 4–10 by Passakorn Suwannawat respectively. At the end he was ranked 94 of the snooker world ranking and thus lost his place on the Main Tour.

=== Amateur 2007–2010 ===
On 1 November 2009 Einsle defeated Itaro Santos, his friend and training partner, 4–2 in the final of the German Championship, held in Bad Wildungen, to win the title for the first time. During the tournament he lost only two frames.

=== 2010/2011 season ===
He was awarded another wildcard from the WPBSA for the 2010–11 Main Tour.

He achieved first success in the third event of the Players Tour Championship, when he defeated Jimmy Robertson and former world champion Peter Ebdon, before losing in round 3. In the qualifying for the Shanghai Masters he won his first qualifying match, but he lost in the second round to Irishman Joe Delaney. After the first cut-off point of the world rankings (after EPTC event 2) he was ranked 87 in the world. In the sixth event of the tour he beat Nigel Bond in the first round and was defeated by Ali Carter, at this time No. 2 in the world ranking, with just 3–4.

In December, he withdrew from the Tour for the remainder of the season.

=== 2013/2014 season ===
In April 2013 Einsle won one of the three final matches of the EBSA Qualifying Tour and thus received a two-year tour ticket for the 2013–14 and 2014–15 seasons. However, he only won two matches of his fourteen in the season at the last 128 stage of PTC events, which left him ranked 118th at the end of the season. Einsle didn't enter a single event after the Gdynia Open in February 2014 and eventually resigned from the main tour once again.

=== Return to amateur status ===
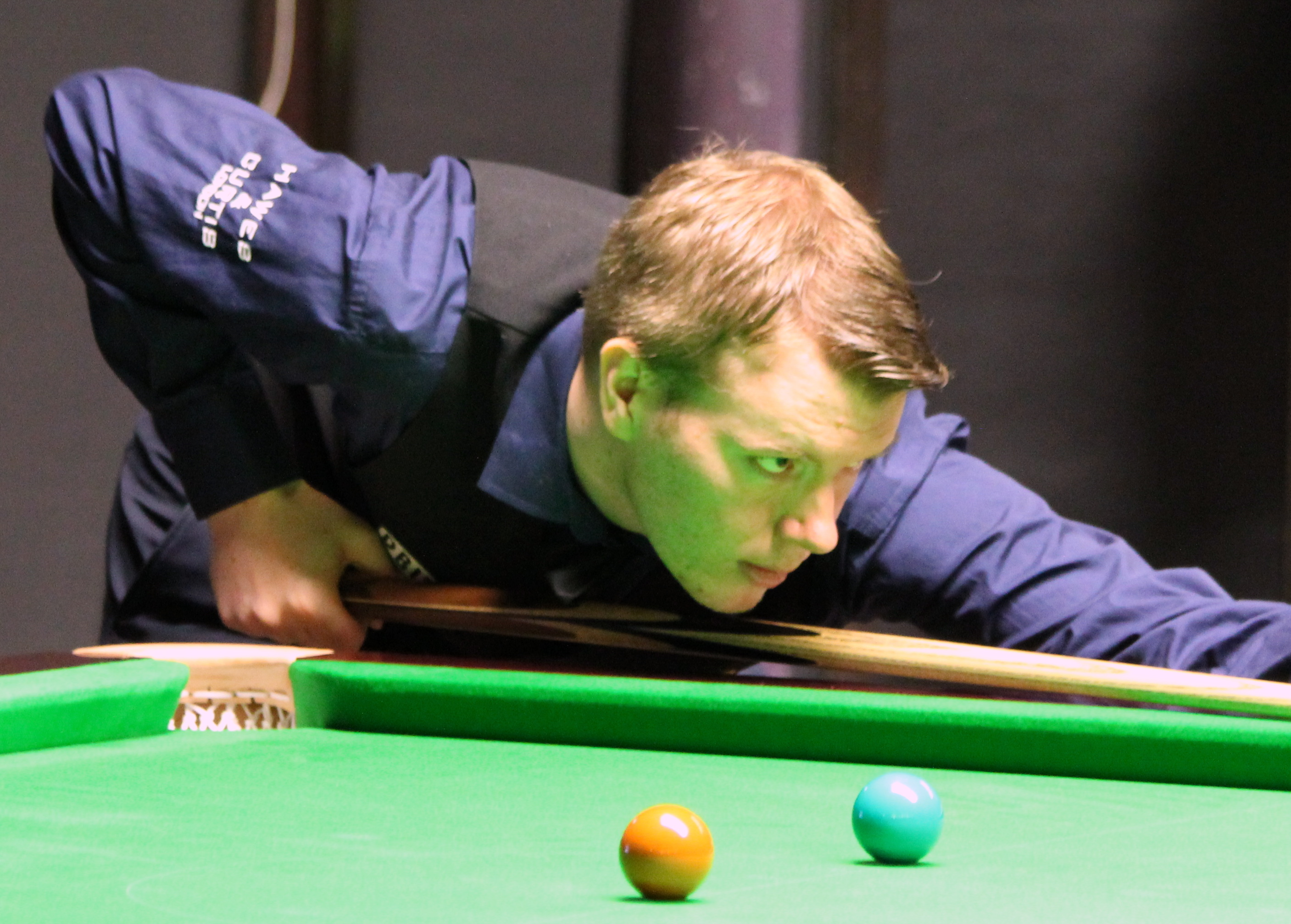
2016 Paul Hunter Classic

Since dropping off the tour Einsle plays in the Paul Hunter Classic which is held in Fürth every year. In 2014 he lost 4–3 to Marc Davis in the second qualifying round. In 2015 he won three matches to reach the main draw, but lost 4–1 to Matthew Stevens in the first round and he was knocked out by the same opponent 4–2 in the opening round a year later.

== Century breaks ==
His highest break of 146 points he scored in an U21-tournament. His highest professional break is 112.

== Performance and rankings timeline ==
Tournament	2006/ 07	2010/ 11	2011/ 12	2012/ 13	2013/ 14	2014/ 15	2015/ 16	2016/ 17	2017/ 18	2018/ 19
Ranking (Note: From the 2010/2011 season it shows the ranking at the beginning of the season.)	(Note: New players on the Main Tour don't have a ranking.)	(Note: New players on the Main Tour don't have a ranking. Since December 2010 he was an amateur.)	(Note: He was an amateur.)							
Ranking tournaments
Riga Masters (Note: The event was called the Riga Open (2014/2015–2015/2016))	Tournament Not Held					Minor-Rank.		A	A	A
World Open (Note: The event was called the Grand Prix (2006/2007))	LQ	LQ	A	A	A	Not Held		A	A	A
Paul Hunter Classic (Note: The event was called the Fürth German Open (2006/2007))	PA	Minor-Ranking Event						1R	LQ	1R
Indian Open	Not Held				LQ	A	NH	A	A	A
China Championship	Tournament Not Held							NR	A	A
European Masters	LQ	Tournament Not Held						A	A	A
English Open	Tournament Not Held							A	A	A
International Championship	Not Held			A	A	A	A	A	A	A
Northern Ireland Open	Tournament Not Held							A	A	A
UK Championship	LQ	LQ	A	A	1R	A	A	A	A	A
Scottish Open	Not Held			MR	Not Held			A	A	A
German Masters	NH	A	WR	A	A	A	A	A	A	A
World Grand Prix	Not Held					NR	DNQ	DNQ	DNQ	DNQ
Welsh Open	LQ	A	A	A	A	A	A	A	A	A
Players Championship (Note: The event was called the Players Tour Championship Grand Finals (2010/2011–2015/2016))	NH	DNQ	DNQ	DNQ	DNQ	DNQ	DNQ	DNQ	DNQ	DNQ
Gibraltar Open	Tournament Not Held						MR	A	A	A
Tour Championship	Tournament Not Held									DNQ
China Open	LQ	A	A	A	A	A	A	A	A	A
World Championship	LQ	A	A	A	A	A	A	A	A	A
Non-ranking tournaments
Six-red World Championship	NH	RR	NH	A	A	A	A	A	A	A
The Masters	LQ	A	A	A	A	A	A	A	A	A
Former ranking tournaments
Northern Ireland Trophy	LQ	Tournament Not Held								
Wuxi Classic	NH	Non-Ranking		A	LQ	A	Not Held			
Australian Goldfields Open	Not Held		A	A	LQ	A	A	Not Held		
Shanghai Masters	NH	LQ	A	A	LQ	A	A	A	A	NR

Performance Table Legend
LQ	lost in the qualifying draw	#R	lost in the early rounds of the tournament (WR = Wildcard round, RR = Round robin)	QF	lost in the quarter-finals
SF	lost in the semi-finals	F	lost in the final	W	won the tournament
DNQ	did not qualify for the tournament	A	did not participate in the tournament	WD	withdrew from the tournament

NH / Not Held	means an event was not held.
NR / Non-Ranking Event	means an event is/was no longer a ranking event.
R / Ranking Event	means an event is/was a ranking event.
MR / Minor-Ranking Event	means an event is/was a minor-ranking event.

== Career finals ==
=== Pro-am finals: 1 ===
Outcome	No.	Year	Championship	Opponent in the final	Score
Runner-up	1.	2006	Austrian Open	(England) Matthew Couch	2–6

=== Amateur finals: 4 (3 titles) ===
Outcome	No.	Year	Championship	Opponent in the final	Score
Winner	1.	2009	German Amateur Championship	(Brazil) Itaro Santos	4–2
Winner	2.	2011	German Amateur Championship (2)	(Germany) Stefan Kasper	4–3
Winner	3.	2012	German Amateur Championship (3)	(Germany) Roman Dietzel	4–2
Runner-up	1.	2015	German Amateur Championship	(Germany) Sascha Lippe	3–4
