= Paul Hunter Classic =

German snooker tournament

Tournament information
- Venue: Stadthalle
- Location: Fürth
- Country: Germany
- Established: 2004
- Organisation(s): WPBSA, Snookerstars.de
- Format: Ranking event (2016–2018); Non-ranking event (2019)
- Total prize fund: £120,000
- Final year: 2019
- Final champion: (England) Barry Hawkins

The Paul Hunter Classic was a non-ranking snooker tournament. It changed from a ranking event to a 16-man invitational event in 2019. From 2010 to 2015 it was part of the Players Tour Championship. Barry Hawkins was the champion. After losing its ranking event status, independent promoter Snookerstars.de promoted the 2019 event.

== History ==
The tournament started in 2004 as the Grand Prix Fürth and was staged in Fürth, Germany. After two years as the Fürth German Open, it was renamed the Paul Hunter Classic in 2007 in memory of the late player Paul Hunter. In 2010 it became part of the Players Tour Championship.

There have been six official maximum breaks in the history of the tournament. The first was made by Ronnie O'Sullivan in 2011 against Adam Duffy. The second was compiled by Ken Doherty in 2012 against Julian Treiber. This was Doherty's first 147. The third was made in 2014 by Aditya Mehta against Stephen Maguire. Mehta became the first Indian player to compile an official 147. The fourth was made by Thepchaiya Un-Nooh in 2016 The fifth and sixth were made by Michael Georgiou and Jamie Jones on same day in 2018.

== Winners ==
Year	Winner	Runner-up	Final score	Season
Grand Prix Fürth (pro–am)
2004	(England) Paul Hunter	(Wales) Matthew Stevens	4–2	2004/05
Fürth German Open (pro–am)
2005	(England) Mark King	(England) Michael Holt	4–2	2005/06
2006	(England) Michael Holt	(England) Barry Hawkins	4–2	2006/07
Paul Hunter Classic (pro–am)
2007	(England) Barry Pinches	(Republic of Ireland) Ken Doherty	4–0	2007/08
2008	(England) Shaun Murphy	(England) Mark Selby	4–0	2008/09
2009	(England) Shaun Murphy	(England) Jimmy White	4–0	2009/10
Paul Hunter Classic (minor-ranking)
2010	(England) Judd Trump	(England) Anthony Hamilton	4–3	2010/11
2011	(England) Mark Selby	(England) Mark Davis	4–0	2011/12
2012	(England) Mark Selby	(Northern Ireland) Joe Swail	4–1	2012/13
2013	(England) Ronnie O'Sullivan	(Northern Ireland) Gerard Greene	4–0	2013/14
2014	(Northern Ireland) Mark Allen	(England) Judd Trump	4–2	2014/15
2015	(England) Ali Carter	(England) Shaun Murphy	4–3	2015/16
Paul Hunter Classic (ranking)
2016	(England) Mark Selby	(England) Tom Ford	4–2	2016/17
2017	(Wales) Michael White	(England) Shaun Murphy	4–2	2017/18
2018	(England) Kyren Wilson	(England) Peter Ebdon	4–2	2018/19
Paul Hunter Classic (non-ranking)
2019	(England) Barry Hawkins	(England) Kyren Wilson	4–3	2019/20

== See also ==
- German Masters, ranking tournament in Berlin
- FFB Open, minor-ranking tournament in Fürstenfeldbruck
