= Lasse Münstermann =

German snooker player and pundit (born 1979)

Personal information
- Born: 6 April 1979 (age 47) Göttingen, Lower Saxony

Sport
- Country: Germany
- Sport: Snooker
- Professional: 2000/2001

Lasse Münstermann (born 6 April 1979) is a German retired snooker player and pundit. He began playing at the age of 11, and in 1994 he played in his first World Amateur Championship in Johannesburg, South Africa. For a year he trained in England at the Rushden Snooker Academy, where prominent snooker players like Peter Ebdon, James Wattana and Ding Junhui studied.

== Career ==
Münstermann is the winner of several German Championships (Team: 1995 and 2005; double: 1994 and 1997; Single: 2003, 2004 and 2006; U21: 2000). His success in the European tour gave him a place on the main tour and 2001 World Snooker Championship in the 2000–01 season, but it was short-lived. At the 2005 World Games he reached the quarter-finals. For Germany, he was part of a team with Sascha Lippe and Itaro Santos which won the European Team Snooker Championship in Ghent, Belgium, in early 2007. He qualified for the Players Tour Championship 2010/2011, which was held in Germany. He has also contributed to PAT (Playing Ability Test) Snooker along with Thomas Hein, Thomas Moser and Frank Schröder.

== Tournament wins ==
=== Amateur ===
Outcome	No.	Year	Championship	Opponent in the final	Score
Runner-up	1.	2001	German Amateur Championship	(Germany) Sascha Diemer	2–4
Winner	2.	2003	German Amateur Championship	(Germany) Kurt Stock	4–2
Winner	3.	2004	German Amateur Championship	(Germany) Sascha Lippe	4–0
Runner-up	4.	2005	German Amateur Championship	(Brazil) Itaro Santos	0–4
Winner	5.	2006	German Amateur Championship	(Brazil) Itaro Santos	4–3
