= 2026 Q School =

Snooker tournaments

Tournament information
- Dates: 13–31 May 2026
- Venue: Leicester Arena; Kiatthada Billiards & Snooker Club
- City: Leicester; Bangkok
- Country: England; Thailand
- Organisation: World Snooker Tour; Billiard Sports Association of Thailand
- Format: Qualifying School
- Qualifiers: 12 via the 4 events

The 2026 Q School was a series of four snooker tournaments held at the start of the 2026–27 snooker season. An event for amateur players, it served as a qualification event for a place on the professional World Snooker Tour for the following two seasons. The events took place in May 2026 at the Leicester Arena in Leicester, England and at the Kiatthada Billiards and Snooker Club in Bangkok, Thailand, with a total of 12 players qualifying via the four tournaments. The two events held in England were organised by the World Snooker Tour, and those in Thailand were organised by the Billiard Sports Association of Thailand.

== Format ==
The 2026 Q School consisted of four events, two held in the UK and two "Asia-Oceania" events held in Thailand. Eight places on the main tour were available via the two UK events, and a further four places were available via the two Asia-Oceania events. The Asia-Oceania events were only open to citizens of those continents. Any player was allowed to enter the UK events, but players could not enter both the Asia-Oceania and UK events. All matches were the best of seven frames.

== Event 1 ==
The first 2026 Q School event was held from 20 to 25 May 2026 at the Leicester Arena in Leicester, England. Cheung Ka Wai, Phil O'Kane, Sean O'Sullivan and Liam Davies qualified. The results of the four final matches are given below.

- Cheung Ka Wai (HKG) 4–1 Jack Bradford (WAL)
- Phil O'Kane (ENG) 4–1 Jamie O'Neill (ENG)
- Sean O'Sullivan (ENG) 4–2 Joshua Thomond (ENG)
- Liam Davies (WAL) 4–2 Dean Young (SCO)

== Event 2 ==
The second 2026 Q School event was held from 26 to 31 May 2026 at the Leicester Arena in Leicester, England. Andrew Higginson, Gong Chenzhi, Stuart Carrington and Mitchell Mann qualified. The results of the four final matches are given below.

- Andrew Higginson (ENG) 4–1 Yaron Bodor (ISR)
- Gong Chenzhi (CHN) 4–2 Brian Ochoiski (FRA)
- Stuart Carrington (ENG) 4–1 Mark Joyce (ENG)
- Mitchell Mann (ENG) 4–2 Allan Taylor (ENG)

== Asia-Oceania event 1 ==
The first 2026 Asia-Oceania Q School event was held from 14 to 18 May 2026 at the Kiatthada Academy & Snooker Club in Bangkok, Thailand. Thanawat Tirapongpaiboon and Deng Haohui qualified. The results of the two final matches are given below.

- Thanawat Tirapongpaiboon (THA) 4–1 Bai Langning (CHN)
- Deng Haohui (CHN) 4–1 Amir Sarkhosh (IRN)

== Asia-Oceania event 2 ==
The second 2026 Asia-Oceania Q School event was held from 20 to 24 May 2026 at the Kiatthada Academy & Snooker Club in Bangkok, Thailand. Huang Jiahao and Liu Yang qualified. The results of the two final matches are given below.

- Huang Jiahao (CHN) 4–2 Liang Xiaolong (CHN)
- Liu Yang (CHN) 4–2 Chen Ruifu (CHN)

== Q School Order of Merit ==
A Q School Order of Merit was produced for players who failed to gain a place on the main tour. The Order of Merit will be used to top up fields for the 2026–27 snooker season where an event fails to attract the required number of entries. The rankings in the Order of Merit were based on the number of frames won in the two UK Q School events. Players who received a bye into the second round were awarded four points for round one. Where players were equal, those who won the most frames in the first event were ranked higher. Other tie-breaker criteria are used if players are still tied.

The leading players in the UK Q School Order of Merit are given below.

Rank	Player	Event 1	Event 2	Total
1	Joshua Thomond (ENG)	22	14	36
2	Duane Jones (WAL)	11	24	35
3	Nattanapong Chaikul (THA)	19	14	33
4	Allan Taylor (ENG)	11	12	33
5	Patrick Whelan (ENG)	16	15	31
6	Mark Joyce (ENG)	10	21	31
7	Daniel Womersley (ENG)	15	15	30
8	Robert Milkins (ENG)	11	19	30
9	Dean Young (SCO)	22	7	29
10	Jack Bradford (WAL)	21	8	29
