= Q School (snooker) =

Snooker qualifying tournament

Tournament information
- Location: Leicester; Bangkok
- Country: England; Thailand
- Established: 2011; 2022 (Asia-Oceania)
- Organisation(s): World Snooker Tour
- Format: Qualifying school for the Main Tour and Q Tour
- Recent edition: 2026

The Q School is an amateur snooker competition which serves as the qualification school for the World Snooker Tour.

== Overview ==
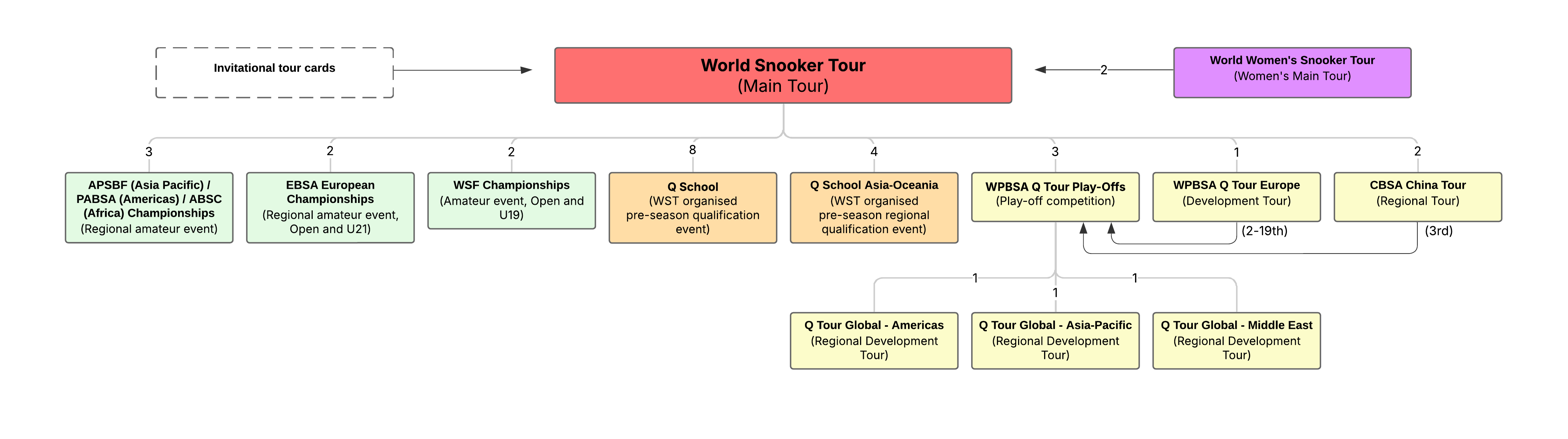
Pathways to enter the main tour, including Q School; note that the graph omits the qualification path to Q Tour Europe

Q School was established in 2011 as an attempt to streamline the qualification process and is held annually before the start of the professional season, where amateurs and ex-professionals who dropped out of the top 64 in world rankings in previous seasons can compete for a two-year tour card to play on the Main Tour. It replaced the amateur tournament International Open Series, the former second-tier snooker series organised by the English Association of Snooker and Billiards (EASB).

Players pay a fixed entry fee to enter the play-off events, and there is no prize money. Winners of quarter-finals will be joining the World Snooker Main Tour, whilst the top 32 players of Q School Europe along with other junior players and Asia-Oceania qualifiers will be invited for the second-tier WPBSA Q Tour.

A Q School Order of Merit is produced for players who failed to gain a place on the main tour every year to top up under-subscribed tournaments on the main tour. The rankings in the Order of Merit were based on the number of frames won in the two UK Q School events.

In 2022, a Q School branch in Bangkok was established for entrants from the Asia-Oceania region. Two qualifying places were awarded to the winners whilst discontinuing qualification through Order of Merit in Q School Europe.

== Qualifiers ==
For each event, the players who qualified for the World Snooker Tour are listed.

Year	Location	Entries	Event	End date	Qualifier 1	Qualifier 2	Qualifier 3	Qualifier 4	Ref.
2011	Sheffield	124	Event 1	16 May	(England) Andrew Norman	(England) David Grace	(England) Adam Wicheard	(Finland) Robin Hull	
2011	Sheffield	124	Event 2	22 May	(China) Li Yan	(Republic of Ireland) David Morris	(England) Simon Bedford	(China) Tian Pengfei	
2011	Sheffield	124	Event 3	28 May	(Norway) Kurt Maflin	(England) Stuart Carrington	(England) Adam Duffy	(England) David Gilbert	
2012	Sheffield	115	Event 1	17 May	(England) Martin O'Donnell	(England) Sam Baird	(England) Ian Burns	(China) Chen Zhe	
2012	Sheffield	115	Event 2	23 May	(Wales) Daniel Wells	(England) Jamie O'Neill	(England) Sean O'Sullivan	(England) Paul Davison	
2012	Sheffield	115	Event 3	29 May	(England) Rod Lawler	(England) Michael Wasley	(England) Joel Walker	(England) Robbie Williams	
2013	Sheffield	110	Event 1	14 May	(England) Elliot Slessor	(England) Alex Davies	(England) Lee Page	(England) Hammad Miah	
2013	Sheffield	110	Event 2	18 May	(Qatar) Ahmed Saif	(Scotland) Ross Muir	(England) Ryan Clark	(Switzerland) Alexander Ursenbacher	
2013	Sheffield	110	Event 3	22 May	(Republic of Ireland) David Morris	(England) Lee Spick	(England) Chris Wakelin	(Scotland) Fraser Patrick	
2014	Gloucester	145	Event 1	15 May	(England) Craig Steadman	(England) Chris Melling	(China) Zhang Anda	(China) Tian Pengfei	
2014	Gloucester	145	Event 2	21 May	(England) Liam Highfield	(England) Michael Georgiou	(Wales) Lee Walker	(Scotland) Michael Leslie	
2015	Burton- upon-Trent	166	Event 1	19 May	(England) Sydney Wilson	(Wales) Daniel Wells	(Scotland) Eden Sharav	(Scotland) Rhys Clark	
2015	Burton- upon-Trent	166	Event 2	25 May	(England) Jason Weston	(Wales) Gareth Allen	(Wales) Duane Jones	(England) Paul Davison	
2016	Burton- upon-Trent	182	Event 1	16 May	(China) Fang Xiongman	(England) Christopher Keogan	(China) Cao Yupeng	(China) Chen Zhe	
2016	Burton- upon-Trent	182	Event 2	22 May	(Cyprus) Michael Georgiou	(England) John Astley	(Malta) Alex Borg	(Wales) David John	
2016	Burton- upon-Trent	182	Order of Merit		(England) Craig Steadman	(England) Jamie Curtis-Barrett	(Wales) Ian Preece	(England) Adam Duffy	
2017	Preston	206	Event 1	14 May	(Germany) Lukas Kleckers	(England) Allan Taylor	(England) Billy Joe Castle	(England) Ashley Hugill	
2017	Preston	206	Event 2	20 May	(Wales) Duane Jones	(England) Sanderson Lam	(England) Paul Davison	(China) Chen Zifan	
2017	Preston	206	Order of Merit		(China) Zhang Yong	(England) Sean O'Sullivan	(Northern Ireland) Joe Swail	(England) Martin O'Donnell	
2018	Burton- upon-Trent	202	Event 1	19 May	(Wales) Jak Jones	(England) Sam Baird	(England) Hammad Miah	(England) Sam Craigie	
2018	Burton- upon-Trent	202	Event 2	25 May	(Northern Ireland) Jordan Brown	(England) Craig Steadman	(China) Lu Ning	(China) Zhao Xintong	
2018	Burton- upon-Trent	202	Event 3	31 May	(Malaysia) Thor Chuan Leong	(Wales) Kishan Hirani	(Hong Kong) Andy Lee	(England) Ashley Carty	
2019	Wigan	218	Event 1	23 May	(China) Xu Si	(England) David Lilley	(England) Jamie O'Neill	(Iran) Soheil Vahedi	
2019	Wigan	218	Event 2	29 May	(China) Chen Zifan	(England) Riley Parsons	(England) Louis Heathcote	(Scotland) Fraser Patrick	
2019	Wigan	218	Event 3	4 June	(England) Barry Pinches	(Malta) Alex Borg	(Switzerland) Alexander Ursenbacher	(England) Andy Hicks	
2019	Wigan	218	Order of Merit		(China) Si Jiahui	(England) Billy Castle	(England) Peter Lines	(China) Lei Peifan	
2020	Sheffield	172	Event 1	7 August	(Wales) Lee Walker	(England) Peter Devlin	(Germany) Simon Lichtenberg	(China) Fan Zhengyi	
2020	Sheffield	172	Event 2	8 August	(Wales) Jamie Jones	(England) Zak Surety	(England) Oliver Lines	(England) Ben Hancorn	
2020	Sheffield	172	Event 3	9 August	(Jamaica) Rory McLeod	(England) Jamie Wilson	(England) Farakh Ajaib	(England) Steven Hallworth	
2021	Sheffield	196	Event 1	1 June	(England) Peter Lines	(Scotland) Fraser Patrick	(Wales) Jackson Page	(China) Yuan Sijun	
2021	Sheffield	196	Event 2	7 June	(England) Barry Pinches	(England) Craig Steadman	(Republic of Ireland) Michael Judge	(England) Alfie Burden	
2021	Sheffield	196	Event 3	13 June	(England) Ian Burns	(China) Lei Peifan	(Scotland) Dean Young	(Wales) Duane Jones	
2021	Sheffield	196	Order of Merit		(England) Hammad Miah	(England) Mitchell Mann	–	–	
2022	Sheffield	173	Event 1	21 May	(England) Rod Lawler	(Hong Kong) Andy Lee	(Republic of Ireland) Fergal O'Brien	(China) Bai Langning	
2022	Sheffield	173	Event 2	27 May	(England) Adam Duffy	(Republic of Ireland) Aaron Hill	(England) Zak Surety	(England) Sanderson Lam	
2022	Sheffield	173	Event 3	2 June	(England) James Cahill	(England) John Astley	(England) Jenson Kendrick	(Germany) Lukas Kleckers	
2023	Leicester	208	Event 1	31 May	(Switzerland) Alexander Ursenbacher	(England) Andrew Higginson	(England) Liam Pullen	(Wales) Andrew Pagett	
2023	Leicester	208	Event 2	6 June	(Scotland) Dean Young	(England) Louis Heathcote	(England) Stuart Carrington	(England) Alfie Burden	
2024	Leicester	167	Event 1	26 May	(Latvia) Artemijs Zizins	(England) Allan Taylor	(England) Haydon Pinhey	(Hong Kong) Wang Yuchen	
2024	Leicester	167	Event 2	1 June	(Poland) Antoni Kowalski	(Scotland) Chris Totten	(Pakistan) Farakh Ajaib	(England) Mitchell Mann	
2025	Leicester	171	Event 1	26 May	(England) Liam Pullen	(England) Oliver Brown	(Switzerland) Alexander Ursenbacher	(Poland) Mateusz Baranowski	
2025	Leicester	171	Event 2	1 June	(England) David Grace	(England) Ian Burns	(Northern Ireland) Fergal Quinn	(England) Connor Benzey	
2026	Leicester	156	Event 1	25 May	(Hong Kong) Cheung Ka Wai	(England) Phil O'Kane	(England) Sean O'Sullivan	(Wales) Liam Davies	
2026	Leicester	156	Event 2	31 May	(England) Andrew Higginson	(China) Gong Chenzhi	(England) Stuart Carrington	(England) Mitchell Mann	

=== Asia-Oceania Q School ===
Year	Location	Entries	Event	End date	Qualifier 1	Qualifier 2	Ref.
2022	Bangkok	70	Asia & Oceania Event 1	5 June	(Pakistan) Muhammad Asif	~~(Thailand) Thanawat Thirapongpaiboon~~ (Pakistan) Asjad Iqbal	
2022	Bangkok	70	Asia & Oceania Event 2	11 June	(Thailand) Dechawat Poomjaeng	(India) Himanshu Jain	
2023	Bangkok	99	Asia & Oceania Event 1	6 June	(Malaysia) Thor Chuan Leong	(Thailand) Manasawin Phetmalaikul	
2023	Bangkok	99	Asia & Oceania Event 2	12 June	(India) Ishpreet Singh Chadha	(China) He Guoqiang	
2024	Bangkok	99	Asia & Oceania Event 1	27 May	(Malaysia) Lim Kok Leong	(Thailand) Sunny Akani	
2024	Bangkok	99	Asia & Oceania Event 2	2 June	(Pakistan) Haris Tahir	(India) Kreishh Gurbaxani	
2025	Bangkok	86	Asia & Oceania Event 1	18 May	(Thailand) Chatchapong Nasa	(China) Liu Wenwei	
2025	Bangkok	86	Asia & Oceania Event 2	24 May	(China) Xu Yichen	(China) Zhao Hanyang	
2026	Bangkok	63	Asia & Oceania Event 1	18 May	(Thailand) Thanawat Thirapongpaiboon	(China) Deng Haohui	
2026	Bangkok	63	Asia & Oceania Event 2	24 May	(China) Huang Jiahao	(China) Liu Yang	

== Statistics ==
=== Players ===
- Craig Steadman and Alexander Ursenbacher have qualified from Q School on a record 4 occasions. Stuart Carrington, Paul Davison, Fraser Patrick, Duane Jones and Ian Burns have qualified through the event on three occasions.
- Michael Georgiou, Jordan Brown, David Gilbert, Fan Zhengyi, Fergal O'Brien and Zhao Xintong are the six Q-School qualifiers to win a ranking event. Zhao is the only one to have won multiple ranking events. O'Brien, Brown and Gilbert had been professionals before qualifying through Q School.
- The youngest qualifier through Q School was Lei Peifan at 15, while Peter Lines was the oldest, qualifying at 51 in 2021.

=== Order of Merit ===
- Over the last three seasons from 2023 to 2025, the third-ranked player from the Q School Order of Merit were able to play in an average of 9 ranking tournaments as a top-up, half of the total amount of ranking events (18) in a typical main tour season; the eighth-ranked averaged 6 rankings tournaments; and the twelfth-ranked or below only 2, namely the Championship League and the Snooker Shoot Out, which suffered a high withdrawal rate from the main tour players due to the nature of such events.
  - A minimum of 35 frames combined from the two Q School events were needed to secure a top-three finish from the Order of Merit rankings, 29 frames for a top-eight finish and 28 frames for a top-twelve finish.
- Alfie Burden is the most successful top-up player in terms of tournament finish by winning the 2025 Shoot Out as the 20th-ranked, and the lowest-ranked to be invited, from the 2025 Q School Order of Merit.
