= 2025 Q School =

Snooker tournaments

Tournament information
- Dates: 13 May – 1 June 2025
- Venue: Leicester Arena; BSAT Academy
- City: Leicester; Bangkok
- Country: England; Thailand
- Organisation: World Snooker Tour; Billiard Sports Association of Thailand
- Format: Qualifying School
- Qualifiers: 12 via the 4 events

The 2025 Q School was a series of four snooker tournaments held at the start of the 2025–26 snooker season. An event for amateur players, it served as a qualification event for a place on the professional World Snooker Tour for the following two seasons. The events took place in May and June 2025 at the Leicester Arena in Leicester, England and also at the BSAT Academy in Bangkok, Thailand with a total 12 players qualifying via the four tournaments. The two events held in England were organised by the World Snooker Tour, whilst those in Thailand were organised by the Billiard Sports Association of Thailand.

== Format ==
The 2025 Q School consisted of four events, two held in the UK and two "Asia-Oceania" events held in Thailand. The two UK events had 171 entries competing for eight places on the main tour, while the two Asia-Oceania events had 86 players competing for a further four places. The Asia-Oceania events were only open to citizens of those continents. Any player was allowed to enter the UK events, but players could not enter both the Asia-Oceania and UK events. All matches were the best of seven frames.

== Event 1 ==
The first 2025 Q School event was held from 21 to 26 May 2025 at the Mattioli Arena in Leicester, England. Liam Pullen, Oliver Brown, Alexander Ursenbacher and Mateusz Baranowski qualified. The results of the four final matches are given below.

- Liam Pullen (ENG) 4–2 Umut Dikme (GER)
- Oliver Brown (ENG) 4–1 Craig Steadman (ENG)
- Alexander Ursenbacher (SWI) 4–1 Ryan Davies (ENG)
- Mateusz Baranowski (POL) 4–2 Patrick Whelan (ENG)

== Event 2 ==
The second 2025 Q School event was held from 27 May to 1 June 2025 at the Mattioli Arena in Leicester, England. David Grace, Ian Burns, Fergal Quinn and Connor Benzey qualified. The results of the four final matches are given below.

- David Grace (ENG) 4–0 Jack Borwick (SCO)
- Ian Burns (ENG) 4–1 Andrew Pagett (WAL)
- Fergal Quinn (NIR) 4–1 Dean Young (SCO)
- Connor Benzey (ENG) 4–2 Rodion Judin (LAT)

== Asia-Oceania event 1 ==
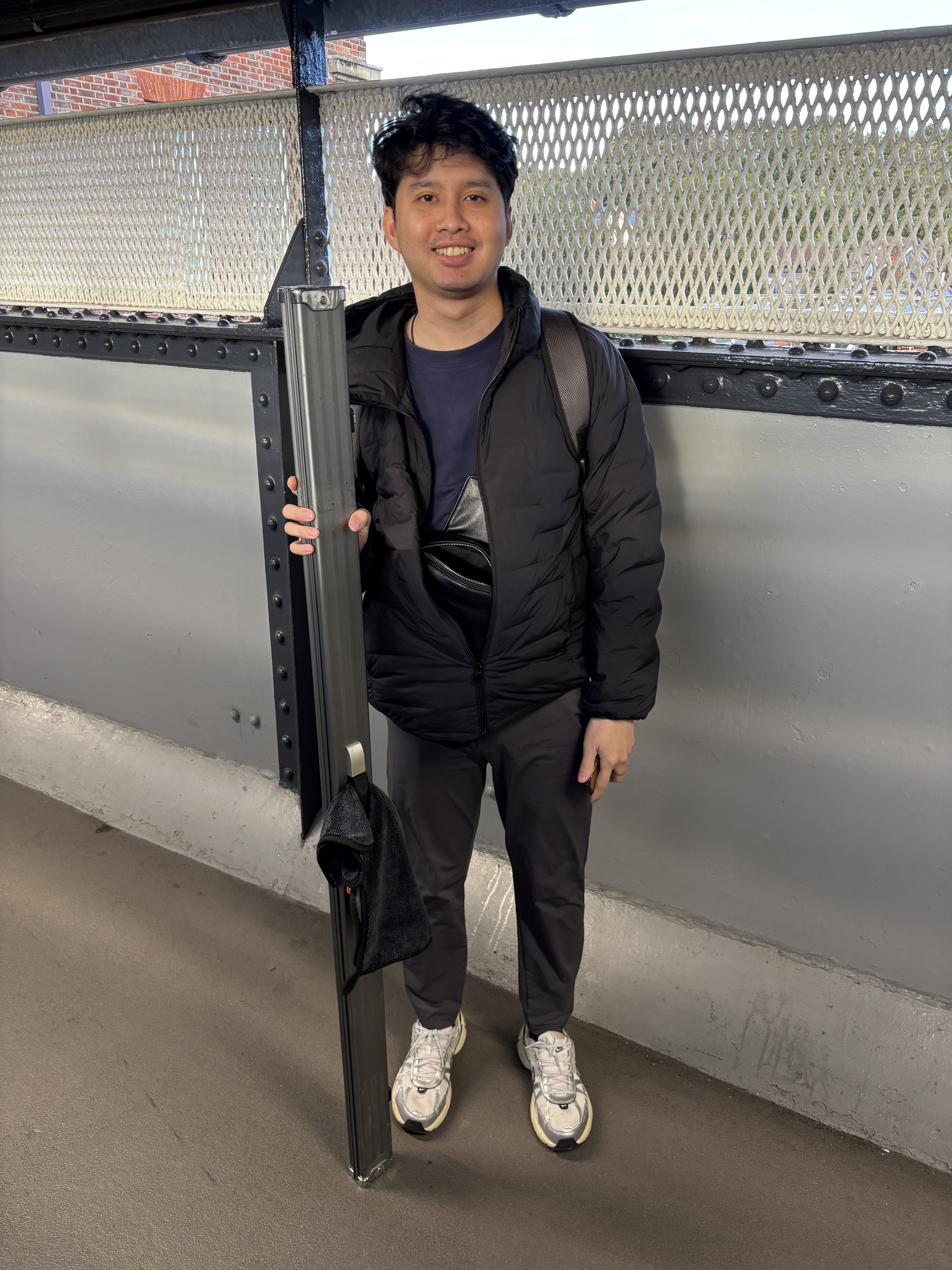
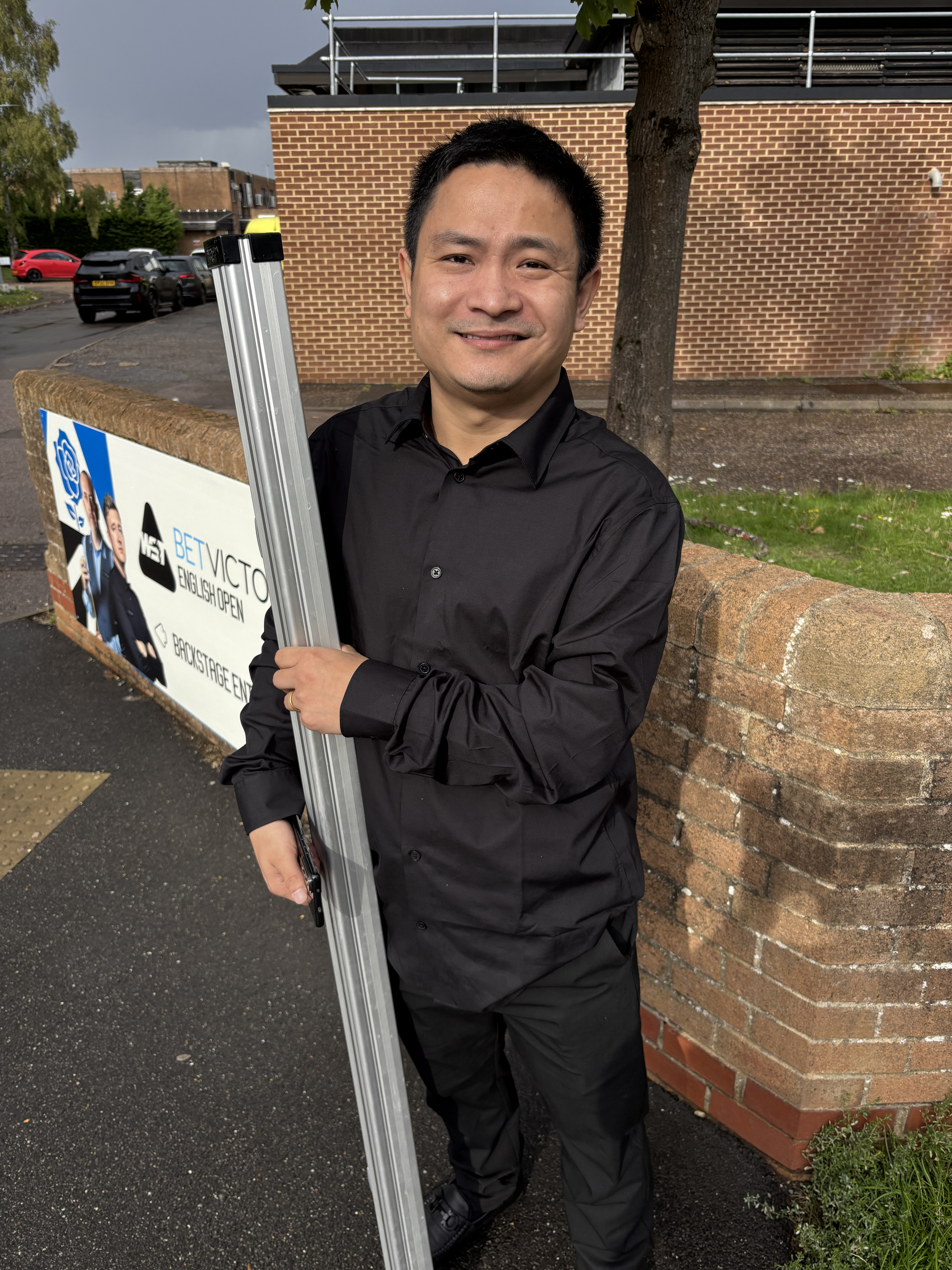
Chatchapong Nasa (left) and Xu Yichen

The first 2025 Asia-Oceania Q School event was held from 13 to 18 May 2025 at the BSAT Academy in Bangkok, Thailand. Chatchapong Nasa and Liu Wenwei qualified. The results of the two final matches are given below.

- Chatchapong Nasa (THA) 4–0 Liu Linhao (CHN)
- Liu Wenwei (CHN) 4–3 Luo Zetao (CHN)

== Asia-Oceania event 2 ==
The second 2025 Asia-Oceania Q School event was held from 19 to 24 May 2025 at the BSAT Academy in Bangkok, Thailand. Xu Yichen and Zhao Hanyang qualified. The results of the two final matches are given below.

- Xu Yichen (CHN) 4–3 Babar Masih (PAK)
- Zhao Hanyang (CHN) 4–1 Narongdat Takantong (THA)

== Q School Order of Merit ==
A Q School Order of Merit was produced for players who failed to gain a place on the main tour. The Order of Merit will be used to top up fields for the 2025–26 snooker season where an event fails to attract the required number of entries. The rankings in the Order of Merit were based on the number of frames won in the two UK Q School events. Players who received a bye into the second round were awarded four points for round one. Where players were equal, those who won the most frames in the first event were ranked higher. Other tie-breaker criteria are used if players are still tied.

The leading players in the UK Q School Order of Merit are given below.

Rank	Player	Event 1	Event 2	Total
1	(Germany) Umut Dikme	22	19	41
2	(England) Patrick Whelan	22	14	36
3	(England) Ashley Hugill	17	18	35
4	(England) Ryan Davies	21	13	34
5	(England) Stuart Carrington	19	15	34
6	(England) Mark Lloyd	18	14	32
7	(Scotland) Dean Young	11	21	32
8	(England) Ashley Carty	14	17	31
9	(England) Daniel Womersley	19	11	30
10	(Wales) Andrew Pagett	9	21	30
