= 2021 Q School =

Snooker tournaments

Tournament information
- Dates: 27 May – 13 June 2021
- Venue: Ponds Forge International Sports Centre
- City: Sheffield
- Country: England
- Format: Qualifying School
- Qualifiers: 14 via the 3 events and Order of Merit

The 2021 Q School was a series of three snooker tournaments held at the start of the 2021–22 snooker season. An event for amateur players, it served as a qualification event for a place on the professional World Snooker Tour for the following two seasons. The events took place in May and June 2021 at the Ponds Forge International Sports Centre in Sheffield, England with a total 14 players qualifying via the three tournaments and the Order of Merit.

== Format ==
The 2021 Q School consisted of three events. The three events had 196 entries competing for 14 places on the main tour. Four players qualified from each of the three events, with a further two places available from the Q Tour Order of Merit. All matches were the best of seven frames.

== Event 1 ==
The first 2021 Q School event was held from 27 May to 1 June 2021. Peter Lines, Fraser Patrick, Jackson Page and Yuan Sijun qualified. The results of the four final matches are given below.

- Peter Lines (ENG) 4–2 Ian Burns (ENG)
- Fraser Patrick (SCO) 4–1 Bai Langning (CHN)
- Jackson Page (WAL) 4–1 Michael Georgiou (CYP)
- Yuan Sijun (CHN) 4–2 Mitchell Mann (ENG)

== Event 2 ==
The second 2021 Q School event was held from 2 to 7 June 2021. Barry Pinches, Craig Steadman, Michael Judge and Alfie Burden qualified. The results of the four final matches are given below.

- Barry Pinches (ENG) 4–3 Sanderson Lam (ENG)
- Craig Steadman (ENG) 4–3 Hammad Miah (ENG)
- Michael Judge (IRL) 4–0 Kuldesh Johal (ENG)
- Alfie Burden (ENG) 4–1 Michael Collumb (SCO)

== Event 3 ==
The third 2021 Q School event was held from 8 to 13 June 2021. Ian Burns, Lei Peifan, Dean Young and Duane Jones qualified. The results of the four final matches are given below.

- Ian Burns (ENG) 4–1 Mark Lloyd (ENG)
- Lei Peifan (CHN) 4–2 Billy Castle (ENG)
- Dean Young (SCO) 4–1 Haydon Pinhey (ENG)
- Duane Jones (WAL) 4–3 Si Jiahui (CHN)

== Q School Order of Merit ==
A Q School Order of Merit was produced for players who failed to gain a place on the main tour directly through the three events. Two places on the main tour were given to the leading two players in the Order of Merit, Hammad Miah and Mitchell Mann. The Order of Merit was used to top up fields for the 2021–22 snooker season where an event failed to attract the required number of entries. The rankings in the Order of Merit were based on the number of frames won in the three Q School events. Players who received a bye into the second round were awarded four points for round one. Where players were equal, those who won the most frames in the first event were ranked higher and, if still equal, the player with most frames in event two.

In addition 48 players were seeded in the 2021–22 Q Tour events based on their position in the 2021 Q School Order of Merit. These were the top 40 ranked players not currently on the main tour and a further eight under-21 players outside this top 40.

The leading players in the Q School Order of Merit are given below, those with Q in brackets being awarded places on the main tour.

Rank	Player	Event 1	Event 2	Event 3	Total
1	(England) Hammad Miah (Q)	15	23	15	53
2	(England) Mitchell Mann (Q)	22	11	17	50
3	(England) Sanderson Lam	9	23	17	49
4	(Cyprus) Michael Georgiou	21	13	13	47
5	(China) Si Jiahui	15	7	23	45
6	(Iran) Soheil Vahedi	14	15	15	44
7	(Wales) Michael White	12	13	18	43
8	(England) David Lilley	19	9	14	42
9	(Scotland) Ross Muir	15	17	10	42
10	(England) John Astley	10	18	14	42

== Two-season performance of qualifiers ==
The following table shows the rankings of the 14 qualifiers from the 2021 Q School, at the end of the 2022–23 snooker season, the end of their two guaranteed seasons on the tour, together with their tour status for the 2023–24 snooker season. Players in the top-64 of the rankings retained their place on the tour while those outside the top-64 lost their place unless they qualified under a different category. Because a number of players in the top-64 were suspended the cut-off to retain a place was extended to the top-68.

Player	End of 2022–23 season		Status for 2023–24 season
Player	Money	Ranking	Status for 2023–24 season
Peter Lines (ENG)	45,500	73	Amateur
Fraser Patrick (SCO)	28,500	89	Amateur
Jackson Page (WAL)	92,000	48	Retained place on tour
Yuan Sijun (CHN)	88,500	52	Retained place on tour
Barry Pinches (ENG)	31,000	84	Amateur
Craig Steadman (ENG)	27,500	90	Amateur
Michael Judge (IRL)	17,500	102	Amateur
Alfie Burden (ENG)	23,500	99	Qualified through the 2023 Q School
Ian Burns (ENG)	42,000	74	Qualified through the one-year list
Lei Peifan (CHN)	33,500	81	Amateur
Dean Young (SCO)	16,000	103	Qualified through the 2023 Q School
Duane Jones (WAL)	30,500	85	Amateur
Hammad Miah (ENG)	55,500	69	Qualified through the one-year list
Mitchell Mann (ENG)	40,000	76	Amateur
