= Bai Langning =

Chinese snooker player (born 2002)

Personal information
- Born: 17 April 2002 (age 24) Songyuan, Jilin, China

Sport
- Country: China
- Sport: Snooker
- Professional: 2019–2021, 2022/2023
- Highest ranking: 94 (September 2020)
- Best ranking finish: Last 8 (2021 Championship League)

Bai Langning (Chinese: 白朗宁; pinyin: Bái Lǎngníng, born 17 April 2002) is a Chinese former professional snooker player who, in 2023, received a ban of two years and eight months from professional competition after committing match-fixing offences.

In December 2022, Bai was suspended from the professional tour amid a match-fixing investigation. In January 2023, the WPBSA charged him with being concerned in fixing a match. Following an independent disciplinary tribunal, Bai was banned from professional competition until 6 August 2025. Investigators revealed that prior to the match-fixing he had accrued debts of £15,000.

== Career ==
=== Early career ===
Bai Langning was born in Jilin, and started playing snooker at the age of 7. After showing great talent at a young age, he moved to Shenzhen in 2015 and was coached by Roger Leighton at the Wiraka Academy, joining students Luo Honghao, Fan Zhengyi, Chen Zifan, Chang Bingyu, and Wu Yize, who all went on to become professional players. Leighton described Bai's style as 'like a young Judd Trump'.

In September 2018, Bai Langning won a CBSA tour event in Foshan, beating Au Chi-wai in the final. He attributed this win to his improved safety play, and commented that his next goal was to become a professional player.

In 2019, Bai Langning was awarded a two-year professional tour card, finishing second on the CBSA China Tour amateur rankings, behind Chang Bingyu. The pair moved to Darlington in the UK, as part of the Q House Academy managed by Chusak Phetmalaikul.

=== 2019/20 season ===
Bai's professional career started slowly, with only two wins against Jimmy White and James Cahill, an amateur. In the Shoot-out, Bai made a 72 break, but his opponent Daniel Wells managed to equalise the score. The frame was decided by a blue ball shoot-out, which Bai fluked, but such flukes were, unfortunately, not permitted in this format.

With the COVID-19 outbreak, Bai returned to China, and did not return for the resumption of the season. He finished the season ranked 121.

=== 2020/21 season ===
The start of the professional season was delayed by the ongoing pandemic, but Bai decided not to return to the UK on the advice of his parents.

The only snooker tournament to be held in China during the 2020–21 season was the China City Teams event in December, in Xi'an. Only two current professional players were able to attend (Mei Xiwen also stayed in China for family reasons). Bai played for the Guangzhou team, alongside former professional Fang Xiongman and CBSA Academy graduate Huang Jiahao. Guangzhou won the tournament, beating Xinjiang in the final.

In March 2021, Bai Langning returned to the UK to play in the World Championship. He defeated Allan Taylor, Alan McManus, and Ben Woollaston to reach the final qualifying round. There, he led Martin Gould 5–2 before the experienced Gould took control, winning the last eight frames. This loss meant he was relegated from the tour, ranked 102.

In an attempt to regain his tour card, Bai Langning entered the 2021 Q School. In the first event, Bai lost to Fraser Patrick in the last round. Subsequent losses to Sydney Wilson and Mitchell Mann in the other two events meant that Bai did not qualify for the 2021–22 tour. However, his total of 41 frames meant that he finished ninth on the amateur top-up list. With only 122 professionals, this would ensure invitations to most tournaments during the season.

=== 2021/22 season ===
In the opening ranking event of the season, the 2021 Championship League, Bai reached the last 8 stage. He lost two matches and drew the other in the round-robin group.

== Personal life ==
When in the UK, Bai Langning lives in Darlington and practices at the Q House Snooker Academy, coached by Mike Dunn.

== Performance and rankings timeline ==
Tournament	2014/ 15	2016/ 17	2017/ 18	2018/ 19	2019/ 20	2020/ 21	2021/ 22	2022/ 23
Ranking (Note: It shows the ranking at the beginning of the season)	(Note: He was an amateur)				(Note: New players on the Main Tour don't have a ranking)	93		
Ranking tournaments
Championship League	Non-Ranking Event					A	3R	A
European Masters	NH	A	A	A	LQ	A	LQ	WD
British Open	Tournament Not Held						2R	LQ
Northern Ireland Open	NH	A	A	A	1R	A	LQ	WD
UK Championship	A	A	A	A	1R	A	1R	LQ
Scottish Open	NH	A	A	A	1R	A	LQ	LQ
English Open	NH	A	A	A	2R	A	LQ	LQ
World Grand Prix	NR	DNQ	DNQ	DNQ	DNQ	DNQ	DNQ	DNQ
Shoot Out	NR	A	A	A	1R	A	1R	A
German Masters	A	A	A	A	LQ	A	A	LQ
Welsh Open	A	A	A	A	1R	A	A	A
Players Championship (Note: The event was called the Players Tour Championship Grand Final (2014/2015))	DNQ	DNQ	DNQ	DNQ	DNQ	DNQ	DNQ	DNQ
Tour Championship	Tournament Not Held			DNQ	DNQ	DNQ	DNQ	DNQ
World Championship	A	A	A	A	A	LQ	LQ	A
Former ranking tournaments
China Open	A	A	A	LQ	Tournament Not Held			
International Championship	A	A	A	LQ	LQ	Tournament Not Held		
China Championship	NH	NR	A	LQ	LQ	Tournament Not Held		
World Open	NH	A	A	LQ	LQ	Tournament Not Held		
Turkish Masters	Tournament Not Held						LQ	NH
Gibraltar Open	NH	A	A	A	1R	A	A	NH
Former non-ranking tournaments
Haining Open	MR	3R	2R	A	A	NH	A	NH

Performance Table Legend
LQ	lost in the qualifying draw	#R	lost in the early rounds of the tournament (WR = Wildcard round, RR = Round robin)	QF	lost in the quarter-finals
SF	lost in the semi-finals	F	lost in the final	W	won the tournament
DNQ	did not qualify for the tournament	A	did not participate in the tournament	WD	withdrew from the tournament

NH / Not Held	means an event was not held.
NR / Non-Ranking Event	means an event is/was no longer a ranking event.
R / Ranking Event	means an event is/was a ranking event.
MR / Minor-Ranking Event	means an event is/was a minor-ranking event.
