= 2024 Q School =

Snooker tournaments

Tournament information
- Dates: 21 May – 2 June 2024
- Venue: Leicester Arena; BSAT Academy
- City: Leicester; Bangkok
- Country: England; Thailand
- Organisation: World Snooker Tour; Billiard Sports Association of Thailand
- Format: Qualifying School
- Qualifiers: 12 via the 4 events

The 2024 Q School was a series of four snooker tournaments held at the start of the 2024–25 snooker season. An event for amateur players, it served as a qualification event for a place on the professional World Snooker Tour for the following two seasons. The events took place in May and June 2024 at the Leicester Arena in Leicester, England and also at the BSAT Academy in Bangkok, Thailand with a total 12 players qualifying via the four tournaments. The two events held in England were organised by the World Snooker Tour, whilst those in Thailand were organised by the Billiard Sports Association of Thailand.

The series was shown live on Facebook and YouTube, the first time the Q School had been streamed.

== Format ==
The 2024 Q School consisted of four events, two held in the UK and two "Asia-Oceania" events held in Thailand. The two UK events had 167 entries competing for eight places on the main tour, while the two Asia-Oceania events had 99 players competing for a further four places. The Asia-Oceania events were only open to citizens of those continents. Any player was allowed to enter the UK events, but players could not enter both the Asia-Oceania and UK events. All matches were the best of seven frames.

== Event 1 ==
The first 2024 Q School event was held from 21 to 26 May 2024 at the Morningside Arena in Leicester, England. Artemijs Zizins, Allan Taylor, Haydon Pinhey and Wang Yuchen qualified. The results of the four final matches are given below.

- Artemijs Zizins (LVA) 4–2 Kayden Brierley (ENG)
- Allan Taylor (ENG) 4–3 Chris Totten (SCO)
- Haydon Pinhey (ENG) 4–2 Gerard Greene (NIR)
- Wang Yuchen (HKG) 4–3 Dylan Emery (WAL)

== Event 2 ==
The second 2024 Q School event was held from 27 May to 1 June 2024 at the Morningside Arena in Leicester, England. Antoni Kowalski, Chris Totten, Farakh Ajaib and Mitchell Mann qualified. The results of the four final matches are given below.

- Antoni Kowalski (POL) 4–1 Simon Blackwell (ENG)
- Chris Totten (SCO) 4–2 Lewis Ullah (ENG)
- Farakh Ajaib (PAK) 4–1 Iulian Boiko (UKR)
- Mitchell Mann (ENG) 4–2 Joshua Thomond (ENG)

== Asia-Oceania event 1 ==
The first 2024 Asia-Oceania Q School event was held from 22 to 27 May 2024 at the BSAT Academy in Bangkok, Thailand. Lim Kok Leong and Sunny Akani qualified. The results of the two final matches are given below.

- Lim Kok Leong (MAS) 4–3 Gao Yang (CHN)
- Sunny Akani (THA) 4–2 Ali Gharahgozlou (IRN)

== Asia-Oceania event 2 ==
The second 2024 Asia-Oceania Q School event was held from 28 May to 2 June 2024 at the BSAT Academy in Bangkok, Thailand. Haris Tahir and Kreishh Gurbaxani qualified. The results of the two final matches are given below.

- Haris Tahir (PAK) 4–2 Lan Yuhao (CHN)
- Kreishh Gurbaxani (IND) 4–2 Muhammad Naseem Akhtar (PAK)

== Q School Order of Merit ==
A Q School Order of Merit was produced for players who failed to gain a place on the main tour. The Order of Merit was used to top up fields for the 2024–25 snooker season where an event fails to attract the required number of entries. The rankings in the Order of Merit were based on the number of frames won in the two UK Q School events. Players who received a bye into the second round were awarded four points for round one. Where players were equal, those who won the most frames in the first event were ranked higher. Other tie-breaker criteria were used if players are still tied. Dylan Emery led the Order of Merit.

The leading players in the UK Q School Order of Merit are given below.

| Rank | Player | Event 1 | Event 2 | Total |
|---|---|---|---|---|
| 1 | (Wales) Dylan Emery | 23 | 18 | 41 |
| 2 | (England) Simon Blackwell | 19 | 21 | 40 |
| 3 | (Ukraine) Iulian Boiko | 14 | 21 | 35 |
| 4 | (England) Joshua Thomond | 12 | 22 | 34 |
| 5 | (England) Paul Deaville | 19 | 14 | 33 |
| 6 | (England) Daniel Womersley | 19 | 13 | 32 |
| 7 | (Ukraine) Anton Kazakov | 17 | 15 | 32 |
| 8 | (England) Joshua Cooper | 19 | 12 | 31 |
| 9 | (Austria) Florian Nüßle | 19 | 11 | 30 |
| 10 | (England) Mark Joyce | 18 | 12 | 30 |
