= Q School =

Q School may refer to:

- Qualifying school, a qualifying tournament held by many professional golf tours
- Q School (snooker), an amateur qualifying competition for the World Snooker Tour
- PDC Qualifying Schools, two qualifying tournaments held simultaneously for the PDC Pro Tour
