= Phil O'Kane =

English snooker player (born 1992)

Personal information
- Born: 25 September 1992 (age 34)

Sport
- Country: England
- Sport: Snooker
- Professional: 2026–present
- Highest ranking: 112 (14 September 2026)
- Current ranking: 120 (as of 7 November 2026)

Phil O'Kane (born 25 September 1992) is an English professional snooker player. He won a two-year card for the World Snooker Tour from the 2026–27 season.

== Career ==
From Sidcup, O'Kane is a member of Spots and Stripes in Redhill, Surrey but started playing cue sports with his father, Danny, at the New Eltham Social Club. He combined his amateur snooker career with working as a lift engineer. In May 2026, he entered Q School for the fourteenth time, having first entered Q School as a teenager in 2011. Recording wins over Zachary Richardson, Daniel Womersley and former professionals Jeff Cundy and Jamie O'Neill in event one, he won a two-year card on the World Snooker Tour from the 2026–27 snooker season.

O'Kane's practice partner is Sean O'Sullivan, a fellow player on the main tour. O'Kane and O'Sullivan both qualified for the main tour on the same day at the 2026 Q School.

O'Kane had his first match win as a professional in June 2026 with a defeat of Chatchapong Nasa of Thailand in the first qualifying round of the 2026 Wuhan Open.

== Performance and rankings timeline ==
Tournament	2011/ 12	2012/ 13	2013/ 14	2016/ 17	2017/ 18	2018/ 19	2020/ 21	2021/ 22	2022/ 23	2026/ 27
Ranking (Note: It shows the ranking at the beginning of the season)	(Note: He was an amateur)									(Note: Players qualified through the Q School started the season without ranking points)
Ranking tournaments
Championship League	Non-Ranking Event						A	A	A	RR
China Open	A	A	A	A	A	A	Not Held			LQ
Wuhan Open	Tournament Not Held									LQ
British Open	Tournament Not Held							A	A	1R
English Open	Not Held			A	A	A	A	A	A	LQ
Shenzhen Open	Tournament Not Held									LQ
Northern Ireland Open	Not Held			A	A	A	A	A	A	LQ
International Championship	NH	A	A	A	A	A	Not Held			LQ
UK Championship	A	A	A	A	A	A	A	A	A	LQ
Shoot Out	Non-Ranking			A	A	A	1R	A	A	
Scottish Open	NH	MR	NH	A	A	A	A	A	A	
German Masters	A	A	A	A	A	A	A	A	A	LQ
Welsh Open	A	A	A	A	A	A	A	A	A	
World Grand Prix	Not Held			DNQ	DNQ	DNQ	DNQ	DNQ	DNQ	
Players Championship	DNQ	DNQ	DNQ	DNQ	DNQ	DNQ	DNQ	DNQ	DNQ	
World Open	A	A	A	A	A	A	Not Held			
Tour Championship	Tournament Not Held				DNQ	DNQ	DNQ	DNQ	DNQ	
World Championship	A	A	A	A	A	A	A	A	A	
Former ranking tournaments
Wuxi Classic	NR	A	LQ	Tournament Not Held						
Australian Goldfields Open	A	A	LQ	Tournament Not Held						
Paul Hunter Classic	Minor-Ranking			LQ	A	WD	Tournament Not Held			
Gibraltar Open	Not Held			1R	LQ	A	A	WD	Not Held	
Former non-ranking tournaments
Six-red World Championship	NH	A	A	A	A	A	Not Held		LQ	NH

Performance Table Legend
LQ	lost in the qualifying draw	#R	lost in the early rounds of the tournament (WR = Wildcard round, RR = Round robin)	QF	lost in the quarter-finals
SF	lost in the semi-finals	F	lost in the final	W	won the tournament
DNQ	did not qualify for the tournament	A	did not participate in the tournament	WD	withdrew from the tournament

NH / Not Held	means an event was not held
NR / Non-Ranking Event	means an event is/was no longer a ranking event
R / Ranking Event	means an event is/was a ranking event
MR / Minor-Ranking Event	means an event is/was a minor-ranking event

== Career finals ==
=== Amateur finals: 3 (1 title) ===
Outcome	No.	Year	Championship	Opponent in the final	Score
Winner	1.	2023	EPSB Open Series - Hurricane - Event 2	(England) Nathan Jones	3–2
Runner-up	1.	2024	EPSB Open Series - Cueball - Event 3	(England) Hayden Staniland	2–3
Runner-up	2.	2024	EPSB Open Series - Cueball - Event 4	(England) Ian Martin	2–3
