= Fergal Quinn (snooker player) =

Northern Irish snooker player (born 2000)

Personal information
- Nickname: Fearless
- Born: 11 March 2000 (age 26)

Sport
- Country: Northern Ireland
- Sport: Snooker
- Professional: 2025–present
- Highest ranking: 90 (July 2026)
- Current ranking: 110 (as of 26 October 2026)
- Best ranking finish: Last 112 (2025 Saudi Arabia Snooker Masters)

Fergal Quinn (born 11 March 2000) is a Northern Irish professional snooker player from County Tyrone. He has earned a two-year card on the World Snooker Tour starting with the 2025–26 snooker season.

== Early life ==
From Coalisland, County Tyrone, Quinn started playing snooker as an eight year-old. His father was a keen amateur snooker player who played against future World Snooker Champion Ken Doherty in competition.

== Career ==
Quinn was entered into the draw at the 2023 Championship League held at the Morningside Arena in Leicester, England from 26 June 2023. In his opening match he recorded a win over world number 18 Hossein Vafaei, before missing out on a place in the next stage against Martin O'Donnell.

He entered Q School in May 2024, where in the first event he was edged out 4-3 by Dylan Emery. He was a top-up player competing as an amateur at the 2024 Championship League in Leicester in June 2024.

He reached the semi-final of the WSF Championship in January 2025 where he faced Gao Yang of China, losing 4-2. For this performance, he was awarded a place into the qualifying rounds for the 2025 World Snooker Championship, where he lost in the first round 10-9 to Liam Graham. He reached the final round of the second event at Q School in May 2025 by defeating former professional Ashley Carty, before facing another former professional in Dean Young. A 4-1 win over Young earned a two-year card on the World Snooker Tour, starting with the 2025–26 snooker season.

=== 2025-26 season ===
He made his professional debut at the Wuhan Open, where he lost in the first round 5-0 against world number 46 Thepchaiya Un-Nooh. He recorded his first frames in a 4-2 defeat to Gao Yang in the 2025 British Open qualifying round in June 2025. He was drawn in the round-robin stage of the 2025 Championship League against Matthew Selt, Scott Donaldson and Umut Dikme of Germany. He defeated countryman Robbie McGuigan 4-3 in the first qualifying round of the 2025 Northern Ireland Open. In April 2026, he recorded a 10-4 win over Egyptian Hatem Yassen in the first round of qualifying for the 2026 World Snooker Championship, before losing in the second round to Long Zehuang.

== Personal life ==
When based at the Q House academy in Darlington he shared a flat with fellow snooker player Hossein Vafaei.

== Performance and rankings timeline ==
Tournament	2017/ 18	2020/ 21	2022/ 23	2023/ 24	2024/ 25	2025/ 26	2026/ 27
Ranking (Note: It shows the ranking at the beginning of the season)	(Note: He was an amateur)					(Note: New players on the Main Tour don't have a ranking)	90
Ranking tournaments
Championship League	NR	A	A	RR	RR	RR	RR
China Open	A	Tournament Not Held					LQ
Wuhan Open	Not Held			A	A	LQ	LQ
British Open	Not Held		A	A	A	LQ	LQ
English Open	A	A	A	A	A	LQ	LQ
Shenzhen Open (Note: The event was called the Xi'an Grand Prix (2024/2025–2025/2026))	Tournament Not Held				A	LQ	LQ
Northern Ireland Open	A	A	A	A	A	LQ	LQ
International Championship	A	Not Held		A	A	LQ	LQ
UK Championship	A	A	A	A	A	LQ	
Shoot Out	A	1R	A	A	A	1R	
Scottish Open	A	A	A	A	A	LQ	
German Masters	A	A	A	A	A	LQ	
Welsh Open	A	A	A	A	A	LQ	
World Grand Prix	DNQ	DNQ	DNQ	DNQ	DNQ	DNQ	
Players Championship	DNQ	DNQ	DNQ	DNQ	DNQ	DNQ	
World Open	A	Not Held		A	A	LQ	
Tour Championship	NH	DNQ	DNQ	DNQ	DNQ	DNQ	
World Championship	A	LQ	A	A	LQ	LQ	
Former ranking tournaments
Gibraltar Open	LQ	A	Tournament Not Held				
Saudi Arabia Masters	Tournament Not Held				A	2R	NH
Former non-ranking tournaments
Six-red World Championship	A	NH	LQ	Tournament Not Held			

Performance Table Legend
LQ	lost in the qualifying draw	#R	lost in the early rounds of the tournament (WR = Wildcard round, RR = Round robin)	QF	lost in the quarter-finals
SF	lost in the semi-finals	F	lost in the final	W	won the tournament
DNQ	did not qualify for the tournament	A	did not participate in the tournament	WD	withdrew from the tournament

NH / Not Held	means an event was not held.
NR / Non-Ranking Event	means an event is/was no longer a ranking event.
R / Ranking Event	means an event is/was a ranking event.
MR / Minor-Ranking Event	means an event is/was a minor-ranking event.

== Career finals ==
=== Amateur finals: 1 (1 title) ===
Outcome	No.	Year	Championship	Opponent in the final	Score
Winner	1.	2020	Northern Ireland Under-21 Championship	(Northern Ireland) Robbie McGuigan	5–4
