= 2016 Q School =

Snooker tournaments

Tournament information
- Dates: 11–22 May 2016
- Venue: Meadowside Centre
- City: Burton-upon-Trent
- Country: England
- Format: Qualifying School
- Qualifiers: 12 via the 2 events and Order of Merit

The 2016 Q School was a series of two snooker tournaments held at the start of the 2016–17 snooker season. An event for amateur players, it served as a qualification event for a place on the professional World Snooker Tour for the following two seasons. The events took place in May 2016 at the Meadowside Centre in Burton-upon-Trent, England with a total 12 players qualifying via the two tournaments and the Order of Merit.

== Format ==
The 2016 Q School consisted of two events. The two events had 182 entries competing for 12 places on the main tour, four players qualifying from each of the two events, with a further four places available from the Q Tour Order of Merit. All matches were the best of seven frames.

== Event 1 ==
The first 2016 Q School event was held from 11 to 16 May 2016. Fang Xiongman, Christopher Keogan, Cao Yupeng and Chen Zhe qualified. The results of the four final matches are given below.

- Fang Xiongman (CHN) 4–3 Daniel Womersley (ENG)
- Christopher Keogan (ENG) 4–0 Marc Davis (SCO)
- Cao Yupeng (CHN) 4–0 Joe Roberts (ENG)
- Chen Zhe (CHN) 4–1 David Lilley (ENG)

== Event 2 ==
The second 2016 Q School event was held from 17 to 22 May 2016. Michael Georgiou, John Astley, Alex Borg and David John qualified. The results of the four final matches are given below.

- Michael Georgiou (CYP) 4–1 Craig Steadman (ENG)
- John Astley (ENG) 4–0 Peter Lines (ENG)
- Alex Borg (MLT) 4–2 Alexander Ursenbacher (SWI)
- David John (WAL) 4–1 Zak Surety (ENG)

== Q School Order of Merit ==
A Q School Order of Merit was produced for players who didn't qualify automatically from the two events. Four places on the main tour were given to the leading four players in the Order of Merit, Craig Steadman, Jamie Curtis-Barrett, Ian Preece and Adam Duffy. The Order of Merit was also used to top up fields for the 2016–17 snooker season where an event failed to attract the required number of entries. The rankings in the Order of Merit were based on the number of frames won in the two Q School events. Players who received a bye into the second round were awarded four points for round one. Where players were equal, those who won the most frames in the first event were ranked higher.

The leading players in the Q School Order of Merit are given below, those with Q in brackets were awarded places on the main tour.

Rank	Player	Event 1	Event 2	Total
1	(England) Craig Steadman (Q)	17	21	38
2	(England) Jamie Curtis-Barrett (Q)	19	17	36
3	(Wales) Ian Preece (Q)	18	17	35
4	(England) Adam Duffy (Q)	18	16	34
5	(Poland) Adam Stefanow	19	13	32
6	(England) Andy Hicks	13	19	32
7	(England) Brandon Sargeant	15	15	30
8	(England) Peter Lines	10	20	30
9	(England) Zak Surety	9	21	30
10	(England) Daniel Womersley	23	6	29

== Two-season performance of qualifiers ==
The following table shows the rankings of the 12 qualifiers from the 2016 Q School, at the end of the 2017–18 snooker season, the end of their two guaranteed seasons on the tour, together with their tour status for the 2018–19 snooker season. Players in the top-64 of the rankings retained their place on the tour while those outside the top-64 lost their place unless they qualified under a different category.

Player	End of 2017–18 season		Status for 2018–19 season
Player	Money	Ranking	Status for 2018–19 season
Fang Xiongman (CHN)	32,150	90	Amateur
Christopher Keogan (ENG)	8,550	119	Amateur
Cao Yupeng (CHN)	132,525	38	Retained place on tour
Chen Zhe (CHN)	17,500	106	Amateur
Michael Georgiou (CYP)	107.737	49	Retained place on tour
John Astley (ENG)	81,725	66	Qualified through the one-year list
Alex Borg (MLT)	18,100	103	Amateur
David John (WAL)	2,337	128	Amateur
Craig Steadman (ENG)	32,550	89	Qualified through the 2018 Q School
Jamie Curtis-Barrett (ENG)	11,100	115	Amateur
Ian Preece (WAL)	39,100	84	Amateur
Adam Duffy (ENG)	33,362	87	Amateur
