= 2023 Q School =

Snooker tournaments

Tournament information
- Dates: 26 May – 12 June 2023
- Venue: Leicester Arena; BSAT Academy
- City: Leicester; Bangkok
- Country: England; Thailand
- Organisation: World Snooker Tour; Billiard Sports Association of Thailand
- Format: Qualifying School
- Qualifiers: 12 via the 4 events

The 2023 Q School was a series of four snooker tournaments held at the start of the 2023–24 snooker season. An event for amateur players, it served as a qualification event for a place on the professional World Snooker Tour for the following two seasons. The events took place in May and June 2023 at the Leicester Arena in Leicester, England, and also at the BSAT Academy in Bangkok, Thailand, with a total 12 players qualifying via the four tournaments. The two events held in England were organised by the World Snooker Tour, while those in Thailand were organised by the Billiard Sports Association of Thailand.

== Format ==
The 2023 Q School consisted of four events, two held in the UK and two "Asia-Oceania" events held in Thailand. The two UK events had 208 entries competing for eight places on the main tour, while the two Asia-Oceania events had 99 players competing for a further four places. The Asia-Oceania events were only open to citizens of those continents. Any player was allowed to enter the UK events, but players could not enter both the Asia-Oceania and UK events. All matches were the best of seven frames.

== Event 1 ==
The first 2023 Q School event was held from 26 to 31 May 2023 at the Morningside Arena in Leicester, England. Alexander Ursenbacher, Andrew Higginson, Andrew Pagett and Liam Pullen qualified. The results of the four final matches are given below.

- Alexander Ursenbacher (SUI) 4–3 Barry Pinches (ENG)
- Andrew Higginson (ENG) 4–0 Haydon Pinhey (ENG)
- Liam Pullen (ENG) 4–0 Alex Taubman (WAL)
- Andrew Pagett (WAL) 4–2 Iulian Boiko (UKR)

== Event 2 ==
The second 2023 Q School event was held from 1 to 6 June 2023 at the Morningside Arena in Leicester, England. Dean Young, Louis Heathcote, Stuart Carrington and Alfie Burden qualified. The results of the four final matches are given below.

- Dean Young (SCO) 4–3 Florian Nüßle (AUT)
- Louis Heathcote (ENG) 4–3 Ryan Davies (ENG)
- Stuart Carrington (ENG) 4–0 Rory McLeod (JAM)
- Alfie Burden (ENG) 4–3 Iulian Boiko (UKR)

== Asia-Oceania event 1 ==
The first 2023 Asia-Oceania Q School event was held from 1 to 6 June 2023 at the BSAT Academy in Bangkok, Thailand. Thor Chuan Leong and Manasawin Phetmalaikul qualified. The results of the two final matches are given below.

- Thor Chuan Leong (MAS) 4–1 Lei Peifan (CHN)
- Manasawin Phetmalaikul (THA) 4–1 Cheung Ka Wai (HKG)

== Asia-Oceania event 2 ==
The second 2023 Asia-Oceania Q School event was held from 7 to 12 June 2023 at the BSAT Academy in Bangkok, Thailand. Ishpreet Singh Chadha and He Guoqiang qualified. The results of the two final matches are given below.

- Ishpreet Singh Chadha (IND) 4–0 Chau Hon Man (HKG)
- He Guoqiang (CHN) 4–3 Wang Yuchen (CHN)

== Q School Order of Merit ==
A Q School Order of Merit was produced for players who failed to gain a place on the main tour. The Order of Merit was used to top up fields for the 2023–24 snooker season where an event failed to attract the required number of entries. The rankings in the Order of Merit were based on the number of frames won in the two UK Q School events. Players who received a bye into the second round were awarded four points for round one. Where players were equal, those who won the most frames in the first event were ranked higher. Other tie-breaker criteria were used if players were still tied. Iulian Boiko led the Order of Merit.

In addition 48 players were seeded in the 2023–24 Q Tour UK/Europe events based on their position in the 2023 Q School Orders of Merit. These were the top 32 eligible players from the 2023 UK Q School Order of Merit, the top eight from the 2023 Asia-Oceania Q School Order of Merit, and the eight highest ranked junior players on the 2023 UK Q School Order of Merit, not already qualified.

The leading players in the UK Q School Order of Merit are given below.

| Rank | Player | Event 1 | Event 2 | Total |
|---|---|---|---|---|
| 1 | (Ukraine) Iulian Boiko | 22 | 23 | 45 |
| 2 | (England) Haydon Pinhey | 20 | 17 | 37 |
| 3 | (England) Sydney Wilson | 18 | 18 | 36 |
| 4 | (Wales) Duane Jones | 15 | 18 | 33 |
| 5 | (Wales) Alfie Davies | 15 | 18 | 33 |
| 6 | (England) Barry Pinches | 23 | 8 | 31 |
| 7 | (Jamaica) Rory McLeod | 10 | 20 | 30 |
| 8 | (England) Steven Hallworth | 18 | 11 | 29 |
| 9 | (England) Simon Bedford | 13 | 16 | 29 |
| 10 | (Austria) Florian Nüßle | 6 | 23 | 29 |
