= 2022 Snooker Shoot Out =

Snooker tournament

2022 BetVictor Snooker Shoot Out

Tournament information
- Dates: 20–23 January 2022
- Venue: Morningside Arena
- City: Leicester
- Country: England
- Organisation: World Snooker Tour
- Format: Ranking event
- Total prize fund: £171,000
- Winner's share: £50,000
- Highest break: Hossein Vafaei (IRN) (123)

Final
- Champion: Hossein Vafaei (IRN)
- Runner-up: Mark Williams (WAL)
- Score: 71–0 (one frame)

The 2022 Snooker Shoot Out (officially the 2022 BetVictor Snooker Shoot Out) was a professional ranking snooker tournament that took place from 20 to 23 January 2022 at the Morningside Arena in Leicester, England. It was the eighth ranking event of the 2021–22 snooker season, played under a variation of the standard rules of snooker. The event was the fourth of eight events sponsored by BetVictor, making up the 2022 European Series.

Ryan Day was the defending champion, having defeated Mark Selby 67–24 in the 2021 final, but he was defeated in the first round by Jak Jones.

Hossein Vafaei won the first professional title of his career, beating Mark Williams 71–0 in the final.

== Tournament format ==
The tournament was played using a variation of the traditional snooker rules. The draw was randomised before each round. All matches were played over a single frame, each of which lasted up to 10 minutes. The event featured a variable shot clock; shots played in the first five minutes were allowed 15 seconds while the final five had a 10-second timer. All foul shots awarded the opponent a ball in hand. Unlike traditional snooker, if a ball did not hit a cushion on every shot, it was a foul. Rather than a coin toss, a lag was used to choose which player breaks. In the event of a draw, each player received a shot at the blue ball. This is known as a "blue ball shootout". The player who potted the ball with the cue ball from inside the D and the blue ball on its spot with the opponent missing won the match.

=== Prize fund ===
The total prize fund for the event was £171,000 with the winner receiving £50,000. The breakdown of prize money is shown below:

- Winner: £50,000
- Runner-up: £20,000
- Semi-final: £8,000
- Quarter-final: £4,000
- Last 16: £2,000
- Last 32: £1,000
- Last 64: £500
- Last 128: £250 (prize money at this stage did not count towards the world rankings)
- Highest break: £5,000
- Total: £171,000

== Tournament draw ==
All times in Greenwich Mean Time. Times for quarter-finals, semi-finals and final are approximate. Players in bold denote match winners.

=== Round 1 ===
==== 20 January – 13:00 ====
- Ryan Day (WAL) 23–**50** **Jak Jones** (WAL)
- **Allan Taylor** (ENG) **103**–3 Liam Davies (WAL)
- Jimmy Robertson (ENG) 15–**21** **Simon Blackwell** (ENG)
- Dylan Emery (WAL) 45–**48** **Simon Lichtenberg** (GER)
- Lu Ning (CHN) 27–**53** **Stan Moody** (ENG)
- **Ali Carter** (ENG) **81**–0 Matthew Stevens (WAL)
- **Craig Steadman** (ENG) **44**–19 Gerard Greene (NIR)
- Pang Junxu (CHN) 20–**39** **Cao Yupeng** (CHN)
- James Cahill (ENG) 16–**64** **Jackson Page** (WAL)
- Martin Gould (ENG) 3–**49** **Nigel Bond** (ENG)
- Dominic Dale (WAL) 32–**36** **Oliver Lines** (ENG)
- Jamie O'Neill (ENG) 40–**46** **Liang Wenbo** (CHN)
- **Gao Yang** (CHN) **64**–35 Jamie Wilson (ENG)
- John Astley (ENG) 14–**71** **Ian Burns** (ENG)
- Haydon Pinhey (ENG) 33–**35** **Farakh Ajaib** (PAK)
- Chang Bingyu (CHN) 50–**51** **Shaun Murphy** (ENG)

==== 20 January – 19:00 ====
- **Mark Selby** (ENG) **43**–38 Li Hang (CHN)
- **Paul Deaville** (ENG) **59**–50 Chen Zifan (CHN)
- Michael Judge (IRL) 22–**29** **Mark Lloyd** (ENG)
- Fraser Patrick (SCO) 6–**64** **Andrew Higginson** (ENG)
- Sunny Akani (THA) 24–**29** **David Gilbert** (ENG)
- **Ross Bulman** (IRL) **75**–1 Martin O'Donnell (ENG)
- **Aaron Hill** (IRL) **50**–8 Lee Walker (WAL)
- Stuart Carrington (ENG) 1–**59** **Mark Williams** (WAL)
- Lyu Haotian (CHN) 32–**89** **Dean Young** (SCO)
- Ricky Walden (ENG) 27–**54** **Zak Surety** (ENG)
- **Leo Fernandez** (IRL) **38**–1 Fergal O'Brien (IRL)
- Ben Woollaston (ENG) 7–**89** **Jack Lisowski** (ENG)
- **Peter Lines** (ENG) **38**–33 Joe O'Connor (ENG)
- **Lei Peifan** (CHN) **40**–22 Alfie Burden (ENG)
- Reanne Evans (ENG) 1–**100** **Fan Zhengyi** (CHN)
- Rod Lawler (ENG) 3–**52** **Elliot Slessor** (ENG)

==== 21 January – 13:00 ====
- Ashley Carty (ENG) 4–**74** **Mark Allen** (NIR)
- **Barry Pinches** (ENG) **55**–1 Ross Muir (SCO)
- Iulian Boiko (UKR) 1–**67** **Robbie Williams** (ENG)
- **Tian Pengfei** (CHN) **47**–7 Rebecca Kenna (ENG)
- **Stuart Bingham** (ENG) **90**–0 Mark Davis (ENG)
- Noppon Saengkham (THA) 45–**69** **Daniel Womersley** (ENG)
- **Mitchell Mann** (ENG) **32**–21 Xiao Guodong (CHN)
- Thepchaiya Un-Nooh (THA) 33–**49** **Kuldesh Johal** (ENG)
- Ryan Davies (ENG) 21–**27** **Barry Hawkins** (ENG)
- **Michael Georgiou** (CYP) **93**–30 Si Jiahui (CHN)
- **Duane Jones** (WAL) **47**–39 Xu Si (CHN)
- **Mark Joyce** (ENG) **78**–61 Yan Bingtao (CHN)
- Zhang Jiankang (CHN) 17–**66** **Zhang Anda** (CHN)
- **Jamie Clarke** (WAL) **38**–10 Ben Hancorn (ENG)
- **Andrew Pagett** (WAL) **35**–17 Liam Graham (SCO)
- Jimmy White (ENG) 5–**56** **Sanderson Lam** (ENG)

==== 21 January – 19:00 ====
- **Luca Brecel** (BEL) **40**–20 Joe Perry (ENG)
- **Chris Wakelin** (ENG) **37**–2 Michael White (WAL)
- Scott Donaldson (SCO) 24–**27** **David Lilley** (ENG)
- **Hossein Vafaei** (IRN) **124**–7 Peter Devlin (ENG)
- **Yuan Sijun** (CHN) **31**–26 (Note: Yuan Sijun defeated Tom Ford in a sudden death blue ball shootout after the match finished level at 21–21.) Tom Ford (ENG)
- **Billy Castle** (ENG) **61**–23 Sean Maddocks (ENG)
- **Anthony Hamilton** (ENG) **82**–0 Robert Milkins (ENG)
- **Jordan Brown** (NIR) **48**–20 Jamie Jones (WAL)
- **Mark King** (ENG) **38**–24 Graeme Dott (SCO)
- **Lukas Kleckers** (GER) **67**–1 Louis Heathcote (ENG)
- Robbie McGuigan (NIR) 21–**64** **Liam Highfield** (ENG)
- Zhou Yuelong (CHN) 1–**49** **Steven Hallworth** (ENG)
- Bai Langning (CHN) 26–**32** **Ken Doherty** (IRL)
- Andy Hicks (ENG) 23–**76** **Gary Wilson** (ENG)
- **Matthew Selt** (ENG) **66**–36 Ashley Hugill (ENG)
- **Michael Holt** (ENG) **58**–27 Zhao Xintong (CHN)

=== Round 2 ===
==== 22 January – 13:00 ====
- Barry Hawkins (ENG) 20–**36** **Ali Carter** (ENG)
- Fan Zhengyi (CHN) 23–**64** **Duane Jones** (WAL)
- Gary Wilson (ENG) 33–**56** **Kuldesh Johal** (ENG)
- **Liang Wenbo** (CHN) **67**–18 Zak Surety (ENG)
- Shaun Murphy (ENG) 31–**55** **Ian Burns** (ENG)
- **Liam Highfield** (ENG) **39**–16 Craig Steadman (ENG)
- Mark Joyce (ENG) 12–**20** **Jamie Clarke** (WAL)
- **Michael Georgiou** (CYP) **61**–25 Farakh Ajaib (PAK)
- Mark Lloyd (ENG) 22–**43** **Mark Allen** (NIR)
- **Oliver Lines** (ENG) **11**–2 Stan Moody (ENG)
- Zhang Anda (CHN) 17–**29** **Matthew Selt** (ENG)
- Barry Pinches (ENG) 36–**86** **Hossein Vafaei** (IRN)
- **Simon Blackwell** (ENG) **54**–35 Luca Brecel (BEL)
- Paul Deaville (ENG) 14–**40** **Jak Jones** (WAL)
- **Aaron Hill** (IRL) **27**–26 Jackson Page (WAL)
- **Mark Williams** (WAL) **50**–26 Mark King (ENG)

==== 22 January – 19:00 ====
- Elliot Slessor (ENG) 26–**77** **Mark Selby** (ENG)
- **Nigel Bond** (ENG) **29**–18 Peter Lines (ENG)
- **Lukas Kleckers** (GER) **17**–12 (Note: Lukas Kleckers defeated Tian Pengfei in a sudden death blue ball shootout after the match finished level at 12–12.) Tian Pengfei (CHN)
- **Dean Young** (SCO) **76**–5 Yuan Sijun (CHN)
- **Stuart Bingham** (ENG) **42**–9 Lei Peifan (CHN)
- **Mitchell Mann** (ENG) **38**–33 Jordan Brown (NIR)
- Cao Yupeng (CHN) 26–**57** **Allan Taylor** (ENG)
- Gao Yang (CHN) 1–**53** **Steven Hallworth** (ENG)
- **Ken Doherty** (IRL) **27**–9 David Gilbert (ENG)
- **Billy Castle** (ENG) **70**–8 Andrew Pagett (WAL)
- Anthony Hamilton (ENG) 23–**43** **Chris Wakelin** (ENG)
- Leo Fernandez (IRL) 16–**57** **Daniel Womersley** (ENG)
- **Michael Holt** (ENG) **37**–30 Simon Lichtenberg (GER)
- **Sanderson Lam** (ENG) **30**–5 Ross Bulman (IRL)
- David Lilley (ENG) 0–**32** **Andrew Higginson** (ENG)
- Jack Lisowski (ENG) 18–**68** **Robbie Williams** (ENG)

=== Round 3 ===
==== 23 January – 13:00 ====
- Jak Jones (WAL) 22–**63** **Mark Allen** (NIR)
- Ian Burns (ENG) 17–**36** **Mitchell Mann** (ENG)
- Simon Blackwell (ENG) 23–**29** **Andrew Higginson** (ENG)
- Aaron Hill (IRL) 4–**89** **Mark Williams** (WAL)
- Allan Taylor (ENG) 1–**63** **Hossein Vafaei** (IRN)
- **Dean Young** (SCO) **92**–1 Michael Holt (ENG)
- Liam Highfield (ENG) 27–**48** **Daniel Womersley** (ENG)
- **Matthew Selt** (ENG) **46**–3 Ali Carter (ENG)
- **Oliver Lines** (ENG) **63**–47 Stuart Bingham (ENG)
- Duane Jones (WAL) 22–**54** **Steven Hallworth** (ENG)
- Lukas Kleckers (GER) 20–**30** **Billy Castle** (ENG)
- **Michael Georgiou** (CYP) **70**–15 Kuldesh Johal (ENG)
- Ken Doherty (IRL) 50–**52** **Chris Wakelin** (ENG)
- Nigel Bond (ENG) 7–**32** **Jamie Clarke** (WAL)
- **Liang Wenbo** (CHN) **37**–35 Sanderson Lam (ENG)
- **Robbie Williams** (ENG) **57**–1 Mark Selby (ENG)

=== Round 4 ===
==== 23 January – 19:00 ====
- **Mark Williams** (WAL) **57**–1 Matthew Selt (ENG)
- Oliver Lines (ENG) 28–**56** **Liang Wenbo** (CHN)
- **Jamie Clarke** (WAL) **44**–36 Mitchell Mann (ENG)
- **Hossein Vafaei** (IRN) **50**–17 Michael Georgiou (CYP)
- Steven Hallworth (ENG) 21–**46** **Daniel Womersley** (ENG)
- **Robbie Williams** (ENG) **39**–14 Andrew Higginson (ENG)
- **Billy Castle** (ENG) **42**–16 Dean Young (SCO)
- Chris Wakelin (ENG) 6–**79** **Mark Allen** (NIR)

=== Quarter-finals ===
==== 23 January – 21:00 ====
- **Mark Williams** (WAL) **97**–0 Jamie Clarke (WAL)
- **Liang Wenbo** (CHN) **49**–21 Mark Allen (NIR)
- **Hossein Vafaei** (IRN) **71**–3 Daniel Womersley (ENG)
- **Robbie Williams** (ENG) **69**–0 Billy Castle (ENG)

=== Semi-finals ===
==== 23 January – 22:15 ====
- **Mark Williams** (WAL) **124**–1 Robbie Williams (ENG)
- **Hossein Vafaei** (IRN) **92**–48 Liang Wenbo (CHN)

=== Final ===
Final: 1 frame. Referee: Tatiana Woollaston; Morningside Arena, Leicester, England, 23 January 2022 – 22:45
Mark Williams; Wales	0–**71**	**Hossein Vafaei**; Iran

== Century breaks ==
Total: 2

- 123 – Hossein Vafaei
- 103 – Allan Taylor
