= Huang Jiahao =

Chinese snooker player

Personal information
- Born: 17 August 1995 (age 31) Yiwu, Zhejiang, China

Sport
- Country: China
- Sport: Snooker
- Professional: 2024–present
- Highest ranking: 83 (November 2025)
- Current ranking: 97 (as of 7 November 2026)
- Best ranking finish: Quarter-final (2024 Shoot Out)

Huang Jiahao (Chinese: 黄佳浩, born 17 August 1995) is a Chinese snooker player. In 2024, he won a place on the World Snooker Tour from the 2024–25 snooker season.

== Career ==
Prior to turning professional, he was granted a number of wildcard appearances at international snooker tournaments in his native China. At the 2014 Shanghai Masters he played former World Champion Ken Doherty and lost 5-3. He was beaten by Oliver Lines at the 2014 International Championship in Chengdu. He reached the last 64 at the 2015 Xuzhou Open where he lost to eventual winner Joe Perry. He defeated Hammad Miah in the wildcard round at the 2016 World Open to reach the main draw in Yushan County, where he lost to compatriot Zhou Yuelong. He reached the last 16 of the 2016 Haining Open, recording wins over Tian Pengfei and Kurt Maflin before losing to Martin Gould.

Competing domestically, he was a member of The Guangdong team alongside Fang Xiongman and Bai Langning that won the 2020 CBSA Cup, beating Xinjiang in the final. He was runner-up at the Haining Open in 2021. In the final he was defeated by compatriot He Guoqiang. He represented Yushan at the China Snooker Team Tournament in July 2022, alongside Bai Langning and Xing Zihao.

He reached the last 16 of CBSA Tour event, the Huangguoshu Open, in Anshun in August 2023, where he was beaten by Kyren Wilson.

=== Pro career ===
Through his performances on the CBSA China Tour he earnt a place on the World Snooker Tour from the 2024–25 snooker season. In June 2024, he made his precessional debut at the 2024 Championship League in Leicester. In December 2024, he reached the quarter final of the 2024 Snooker Shoot Out his run including a win over David Gilbert, before being defeated by eventual winner Tom Ford.

In June 2025, in the first round of qualifying for the 2025 Wuhan Open, he was defeated by former world champion John Higgins. He was drawn in the round-robin stage of the 2025 Championship League against Ali Carter and Welsh pair Jack Bradford and Liam Davies. He defeated Jimmy White 4-2 in the first qualifying round of the 2025 Northern Ireland Open.

After dropping off the tour at the end of the 2025-26 season, he entered Asia Oceania Q School in May 2026 in Thailand, and won a new two-year card, reaching the final round of event two with a win over fellow former professional Ma Hailong, before he defeated compatriot Liang Xiaolong 4-2 in the final round.

In September 2026, he trailed Jimmy Robertson 5-3 before being ultimately winning 6-5 to qualify for the main draw at the 2026 International Championship, and defeated Liu Hongyu to reach the main draw at the 2026 Northern Ireland Open.

== Performance and rankings timeline ==
Tournament	2012/ 13	2013/ 14	2014/ 15	2015/ 16	2016/ 17	2017/ 18	2018/ 19	2019/ 20	2021/ 22	2024/ 25	2025/ 26	2026/ 27
Ranking (Note: It shows the ranking at the beginning of the season)	(Note: He was an amateur)									(Note: New players don't have a ranking)	87	(Note: Players qualified through Q School started the season without ranking points)
Ranking tournaments
Championship League	Non-Ranking Event								A	RR	RR	RR
China Open	A	A	A	A	A	A	A	Tournament Not Held				LQ
Wuhan Open	Tournament Not Held									LQ	LQ	LQ
British Open	Tournament Not Held								A	LQ	LQ	LQ
English Open	Tournament Not Held				A	A	A	A	A	LQ	LQ	LQ
Shenzhen Open (Note: The event was called the Xi'an Grand Prix (2024/2025–2025/2026))	Tournament Not Held									LQ	1R	LQ
Northern Ireland Open	Tournament Not Held				A	A	A	A	A	LQ	LQ	1R
International Championship	Not Held		WR	A	A	A	A	A	NH	LQ	1R	1R
UK Championship	A	A	A	A	A	A	A	A	A	LQ	LQ	LQ
Shoot Out	Non-Ranking Event				A	A	A	A	A	QF	1R	
Scottish Open	MR	Not Held			A	A	A	A	A	LQ	LQ	LQ
German Masters	A	A	A	A	A	A	A	A	A	LQ	LQ	LQ
Welsh Open	A	A	A	A	A	A	A	A	A	WD	LQ	
World Grand Prix	Not Held		NR	DNQ	DNQ	DNQ	DNQ	DNQ	DNQ	DNQ	DNQ	
Players Championship (Note: The event was called the Players Tour Championship Grand Final (2012/2013–2015/2016))	DNQ	DNQ	DNQ	DNQ	DNQ	DNQ	DNQ	DNQ	DNQ	DNQ	DNQ	
World Open	A	A	Not Held		1R	A	A	A	NH	LQ	LQ	
Tour Championship	Tournament Not Held						DNQ	DNQ	DNQ	DNQ	DNQ	
World Championship	A	A	A	A	A	A	A	A	A	LQ	LQ	
Former ranking tournaments
Shanghai Masters	Not Held		WR	A	A	A	Non-Ranking		NH	Non-Ranking Event		
Saudi Arabia Masters	Tournament Not Held									2R	3R	NH
Former non-ranking tournaments
Haining Open	Not Held		MR		4R	1R	1R	1R	F	Not Held		

Performance Table Legend
LQ	lost in the qualifying draw	#R	lost in the early rounds of the tournament (WR = Wildcard round, RR = Round robin)	QF	lost in the quarter-finals
SF	lost in the semi-finals	F	lost in the final	W	won the tournament
DNQ	did not qualify for the tournament	A	did not participate in the tournament	WD	withdrew from the tournament

NH / Not Held	means an event was not held
NR / Non-Ranking Event	means an event is/was no longer a ranking event
R / Ranking Event	means an event is/was a ranking event
MR / Minor-Ranking Event	means an event is/was a minor-ranking event

== Career finals ==
=== Non-ranking finals: 1 ===
Outcome	No.	Year	Championship	Opponent in the final	Score
Runner-up	1.	2021	Haining Open	(China) He Guoqiang	0–5
