= Dean Young (snooker player) =

Scottish snooker player

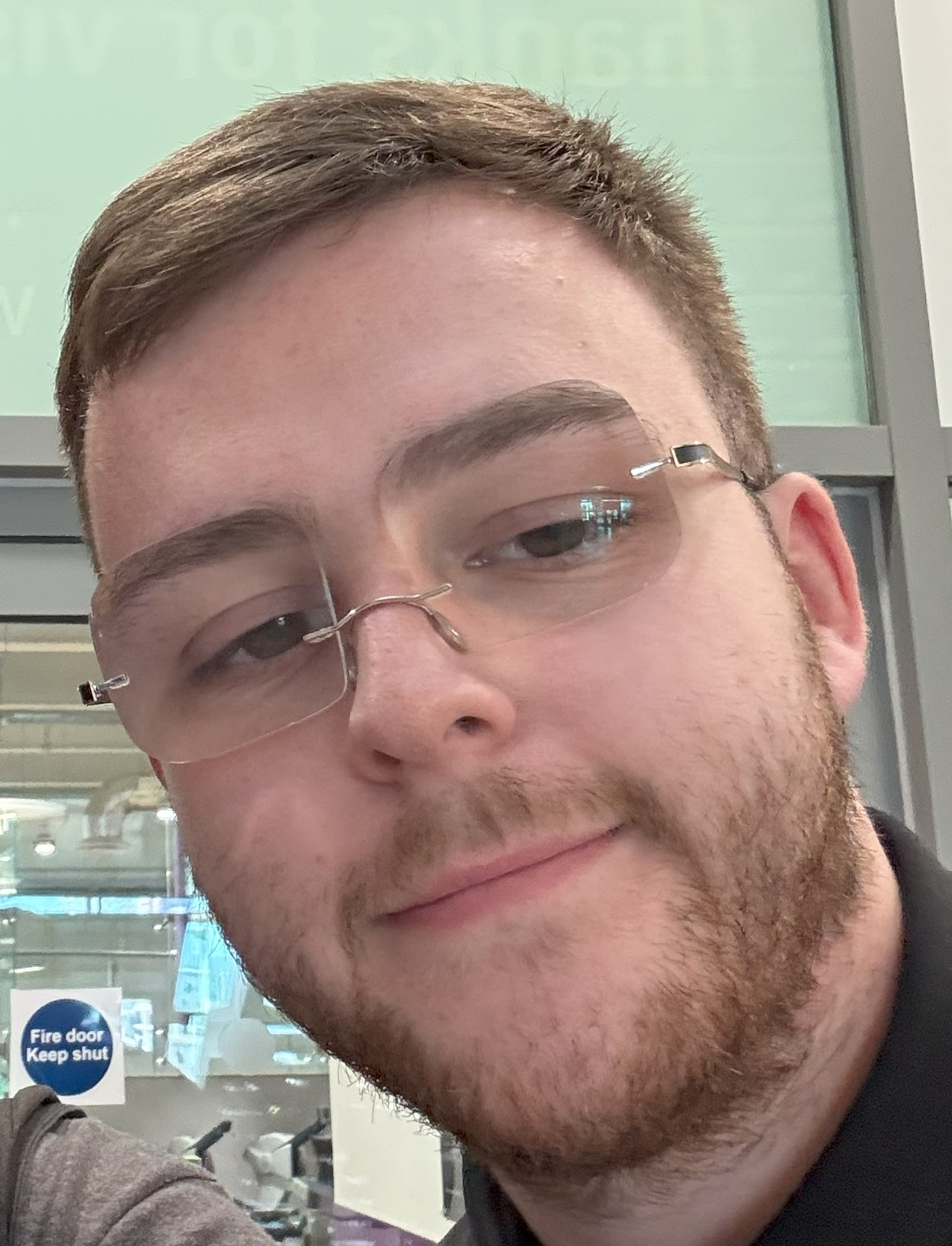
- Young in 2025

Personal information
- Born: 7 January 2002 (age 24)

Sport
- Country: Scotland
- Sport: Snooker
- Professional: 2021–2025
- Highest ranking: 87 (August 2024)
- Best ranking finish: Last 16 (2022 Shoot Out)

Dean Young (born 7 January 2002) is a Scottish former professional snooker player.

== Early life ==
He is from Edinburgh, Scotland, and attended Firrhill High School. He began playing snooker at the age of seven years-old. He is based at the Locarno Snooker Club in Edinburgh.

== Career ==
He won the U-21 Scotland National Snooker Championship in 2018 and 2019 defeating Aaron Graham on both occasions. In June 2021, Young came through event 3 of the 2021 Q School defeating Florian Nüßle and Mitchell Mann amongst others, before beating Haydon Pinhey 4–1 in the final round to earn a two-year card on the World Snooker Tour for the 2021–2022 and 2022–2023 seasons. He was the only rookie from that year's Q-School. He reached round four (round-of-16) at the 2022 Snooker Shoot Out.

After completing two years on the tour, he qualified for a two-year card again in June 2023, at Q School. He described the completion of his first two years as his “apprenticeship”.

He started the 2023-24 season in July 2023 at the 2023 Championship League held at the Morningside Arena in Leicester, England. In the round-robin group stage he earned credible draws against top-50 ranked players Jak Jones and Jamie Jones. In December 2023, he reached the third round of the 2023 Snooker Shoot Out with wins over David Grace and Hong Kong teenager Shaun Liu, before losing to two-time former World Championship runner-up Ali Carter.

He reached the last-32 of the 2024 Scottish Open in December 2024, held in his home city of Edinburgh. He was drawn against Polish teenager Michal Szubarczyk in the first round of qualifying for the 2025 World Snooker Championship in April 2025, winning 10-8 before facing Stan Moody.

He dropped off the World Snooker Tour after the 2024-25 season. He reached the final round of Q School in May 2025 but was denied an immediate return after a defeat to Fergal Quinn. After his performances at Q School he was ranked seventh in the 2025 Q School Order of Merit.

Entered as a top-up player, Young was drawn in the round-robin stage of the 2025 Championship League against Pang Junxu, Jiang Jun and Oliver Lines, recording a 3-1 win over Jiang Jun. Having entered Q School in May 2026, Young reached the final round of event one before losing 4–2 to fellow former-professional Liam Davies.

Competing in the 2026 Championship League in June, Young topped his round-robin group, going undefeated against Reanne Evans, Thepchaiya Un-Nooh and Louis Heathcote. In the second phase the following month, he again went unbeaten, drawing against Xu Si, Jackson Page and Elliot Slessor, with Slessor topping the group with two wins.

== Performance and rankings timeline ==
Tournament	2019/ 20	2020/ 21	2021/ 22	2022/ 23	2023/ 24	2024/ 25	2025/ 26
Ranking (Note: It shows the ranking at the beginning of the season)	(Note: He was an amateur)		(Note: New players on the Main Tour don't have a ranking)	88	(Note: Players qualified through the Q School started the season without ranking points)	90	
Ranking tournaments
Championship League	NR	A	RR	A	RR	RR	RR
Saudi Arabia Masters	Tournament Not Held					2R	A
Wuhan Open	Tournament Not Held				LQ	LQ	A
English Open	A	A	LQ	LQ	LQ	LQ	A
British Open	Not Held		1R	1R	LQ	LQ	A
Xi'an Grand Prix	Tournament Not Held					1R	A
Northern Ireland Open	A	A	LQ	LQ	1R	LQ	A
International Championship	A	Not Held			LQ	1R	A
UK Championship	A	A	1R	LQ	LQ	LQ	A
Shoot Out	3R	1R	4R	2R	3R	1R	1R
Scottish Open	A	A	LQ	LQ	LQ	2R	
German Masters	A	A	LQ	LQ	LQ	LQ	
World Grand Prix	DNQ	DNQ	DNQ	DNQ	DNQ	DNQ	
Players Championship	DNQ	DNQ	DNQ	DNQ	DNQ	DNQ	
Welsh Open	A	A	LQ	1R	WD	LQ	
World Open	A	Not Held			WD	LQ	
Tour Championship	DNQ	DNQ	DNQ	DNQ	DNQ	DNQ	
World Championship	LQ	LQ	LQ	LQ	LQ	LQ	
Former ranking tournaments
WST Pro Series	NH	RR	Tournament Not Held				
Turkish Masters	Not Held		LQ	Tournament Not Held			
Gibraltar Open	A	A	WD	Tournament Not Held			
WST Classic	Not Held			1R	Not Held		
European Masters	A	A	LQ	LQ	LQ	Not Held	
Former non-ranking tournaments
Six-red World Championship	A	Not Held		LQ	Not Held		

Performance Table Legend
LQ	lost in the qualifying draw	#R	lost in the early rounds of the tournament (WR = Wildcard round, RR = Round robin)	QF	lost in the quarter-finals
SF	lost in the semi-finals	F	lost in the final	W	won the tournament
DNQ	did not qualify for the tournament	A	did not participate in the tournament	WD	withdrew from the tournament

NH / Not Held	means an event was not held.
NR / Non-Ranking Event	means an event is/was no longer a ranking event.
R / Ranking Event	means an event is/was a ranking event.
MR / Minor-Ranking Event	means an event is/was a minor-ranking event.

== Career finals ==
=== Amateur finals: 2 (1 title) ===
Outcome	No.	Year	Championship	Opponent in the final	Score
Winner	1.	2019	Challenge Tour – Event 7	(Wales) Andrew Pagett	3–1
Runner-up	1.	2026	Scottish Amateur Championship	(Scotland) Rhys Clark	3–7
