= 2018 Q School =

Snooker tournaments

Tournament information
- Dates: 14–31 May 2018
- Venue: Meadowside Leisure Centre
- City: Burton-upon-Trent
- Country: England
- Format: Qualifying School
- Qualifiers: 12 via the 3 events

The 2018 Q School was a series of three snooker tournaments held at the start of the 2018–19 snooker season. An event for amateur players, it served as a qualification event for a place on the professional World Snooker Tour for the following two seasons. The events took place in May 2018 at the Meadowside Leisure Centre in Burton-upon-Trent, England with a total 12 players qualifying via the three tournaments.

== Format ==
The 2018 Q School consisted of three events. The three events had 202 entries competing for 12 places on the main tour, four players qualifying from each of the three events. All matches were the best of seven frames.

== Event 1 ==
The first 2018 Q School event was held from 14 to 19 May 2018. Jak Jones, Sam Baird, Hammad Miah and Sam Craigie qualified. All four players who qualified had previously lost their professional status after the 2018 World Snooker Championship. In one match, Barry Pinches played his son Luke. The results of the four final matches are given below.

- Jak Jones (WAL) 4–2 Jordan Brown (ENG)
- Sam Baird (ENG) 4–2 Hu Hao (CHN)
- Hammad Miah (ENG) 4–0 Luke Simmonds (ENG)
- Sam Craigie (ENG) 4–0 Dechawat Poomjaeng (THA)

== Event 2 ==
The second 2018 Q School event was held from 20 to 25 May 2018. Jordan Brown, Craig Steadman, Lu Ning and Zhao Xintong qualified. The results of the four final matches are given below.

- Jordan Brown (NIR) 4–1 Jamie Cope (ENG)
- Craig Steadman (ENG) 4–0 Adam Duffy (ENG)
- Lu Ning (CHN) 4–2 Mitchell Mann (ENG)
- Zhao Xintong (CHN) 4–1 Dechawat Poomjaeng (THA)

== Event 3 ==
The third 2018 Q School event was held from 26 to 31 May 2018. Thor Chuan Leong, Kishan Hirani, Andy Lee and Ashley Carty qualified. The results of the four final matches are given below.

- Thor Chuan Leong (MYS) 4–1 Fang Xiongman (CHN)
- Kishan Hirani (WAL) 4–2 Simon Bedford (ENG)
- Andy Lee (HKG) 4–2 Kuldesh Johal (ENG)
- Ashley Carty (ENG) 4–2 Himanshu Dinesh Jain (IND)

== Q School Order of Merit ==
A Q School Order of Merit was produced for players who failed to gain a place on the main tour. The Order of Merit was used to top up fields for the 2018–19 snooker season where an event failed to attract the required number of entries. The rankings in the Order of Merit were based on the number of frames won in the three Q School events. Players who received a bye into the second round were awarded four points for round one. Where players were equal, those who won the most frames in the first event were ranked higher and, if still equal, the player with most frames in event two.

The Order of Merit was used to give priority places for the new Challenge Tour which was played during the 2018–19 snooker season.

The leading players in the Q School Order of Merit are given below.

Rank	Player	Event 1	Event 2	Event 3	Total
1	(England) David Lilley	18	19	19	56
2	(Thailand) Dechawat Poomjaeng	20	21	14	55
3	(England) James Cahill	17	17	19	53
4	(England) Adam Duffy	18	20	14	52
5	(England) Luke Simmonds	20	14	11	45
6	(England) Jamie Cope	9	21	15	45
7	(China) Fang Xiongman	11	10	21	42
8	(England) Farakh Ajaib	9	14	19	42
9	(England) Andy Hicks	7	16	18	41
10	(Republic of Ireland) Michael Judge	6	18	16	40

== Two-season performance of qualifiers ==
The following table shows the rankings of the 12 qualifiers from the 2018 Q School, at the end of the 2019–20 snooker season, the end of their two guaranteed seasons on the tour, together with their tour status for the 2020–21 snooker season. Players in the top-64 of the rankings retained their place on the tour while those outside the top-64 lost their place unless they qualified under a different category.

Player	End of 2019–20 season		Status for 2020–21 season
Player	Money	Ranking	Status for 2020–21 season
Jak Jones (WAL)	82,750	67	Qualified through the one-year list
Sam Baird (ENG)	62,750	73	Amateur
Hammad Miah (ENG)	23,475	97	Amateur
Sam Craigie (ENG)	95,500	58	Retained place on tour
Jordan Brown (NIR)	73,000	69	Qualified through the one-year list
Craig Steadman (ENG)	55,500	75	Amateur
Lu Ning (CHN)	110,250	51	Retained place on tour
Zhao Xintong (CHN)	177,250	29	Retained place on tour
Thor Chuan Leong (MYS)	22,000	98	Amateur
Kishan Hirani (WAL)	25,350	88	Amateur
Andy Lee (HKG)	16,500	104	Amateur
Ashley Carty (ENG)	49,750	77	Qualified as Crucible qualifier
