= Haydon Pinhey =

English snooker player

Personal information
- Born: 30 July 1996 (age 30) Plymouth, Devon

Sport
- Country: England
- Sport: Snooker
- Professional: 2024–2026
- Highest ranking: 80 (July 2025)
- Best ranking finish: Last 32 (x3)

Haydon Pinhey (born 30 July 1996) is an English former professional snooker player from Devon. He has earned a two-year card on the World Snooker Tour starting with the 2024–25 snooker season.

== Early life ==
From Plymouth, Devon. Pinhey attended Sir John Hunt Community Sports College and worked at the Plaza Snooker Club on the Barbican of his home town. Currently Pinhey works and plays for the Legends Lounge within St Budeaux.

== Career ==
He made his television debut at the 2021 Snooker Shoot Out.

=== 2021/2022 ===
Pinhey played in a number of professional events during the 2021-22 World Snooker Tour season, featuring in the Championship League, the Turkish Masters, the Gibraltar Open and the Snooker Shootout. He reached the final round of the third qualifying school event.

=== 2022/2023 ===
In July 2022 Pinhey got the biggest win of his career when he beat world number 21 Matthew Selt to qualify for the European Masters. Further success came at the 2023 Snooker Shoot Out where he reached the last 64.

At the 2023 WST Classic Pinhey secured the biggest win of his career when he beat top-ten ranked and future World Champion Luca Brecel on his way to the last 32. Pinhey secured a good win over Duane Jones at the 2023 Q School as he sought a place on the main tour after losing in the final round for three consecutive years of Q school between 2020 and 2022. Unfortunately for Pinhey, it was fourth consecutive year of being one match away from earning a tour card from Q School as he was defeated by former top-20 player Andrew Higginson. However, his performances were good enough to place Pinhey second in the Q School order of merit, from which top of places are taken for ranking events during the 2023-24 World Snooker Tour.

=== 2023/2024 ===
Pinhey was entered into the draw for the 2023 Championship League held at the Morningside Arena in Leicester, England from 26 June 2023. His results included a draw against Mohamed Ibrahim, and a defeat to Si Jiahui. He qualified for the 2024 German Masters in Berlin with a win over the experienced Rod Lawler. In the first round of qualifying for the 2024 World Snooker Championship he defeated Hammad Miah 10-2. In May 2024, he entered European 2024 Q School and in the first event recorded victory over former professional Anton Kazakov of Ukraine, and beat veteran professional Gerard Greene in the final round to win a two-year assured place on the World Snooker Tour starting from the 2024-25 snooker season.

=== 2024/25 ===
He defeated Stephen Maguire 6-2 at the International Championship on 1 October 2024. In February 2025, he reached the last-64 of the 2025 Welsh Open where he was beaten by former world champion Mark Selby. He was defeated by former world champion Ken Doherty in qualifying for the 2025 World Championships.

=== 2025/26 ===
He started the 2025-26 season in June 2025 in the qualifying round for the Wuhan Open with a creditable 5-1 win over established professional Martin O'Donnell. He was drawn in the round-robin stage of the 2025 Championship League against Barry Hawkins, Haris Tahir and John Astley, topping the group with a 3-0 win over Hawkins. Competing at the 2025 Scottish Open in October 2025, he recorded a 4-0 win over women's world number one Mink Nutcharut. In April 2026, Pinhey was relegated from the main tour after a 10-5 defeat to Jamie Clarke in the first round of qualifying for the 2026 World Snooker Championship. After dropping off the tour following the conclusion of the 2025-26 season, he entered Q School and defeated Riley Powell in event one.

== Personal life ==
Pinhey is a father of two children.

== Performance and rankings timeline ==
Tournament	2020/ 21	2021/ 22	2022/ 23	2023/ 24	2024/ 25	2025/ 26	2026/ 27
Ranking (Note: It shows the ranking at the beginning of the season)	(Note: He was an amateur)				(Note: New players don't have a ranking)	81	
Ranking tournaments
Championship League	RR	RR	RR	RR	RR	2R	RR
China Open	Tournament Not Held						
Wuhan Open	Not Held			A	LQ	1R	
British Open	NH	A	A	A	LQ	LQ	
English Open	A	A	A	A	LQ	LQ	
Shenzhen Open (Note: The event was called the Xi'an Grand Prix (2024/2025–2025/2026))	Tournament Not Held				LQ	LQ	
Northern Ireland Open	A	A	A	A	LQ	LQ	
International Championship	Not Held			A	1R	LQ	
UK Championship	A	A	A	A	LQ	LQ	
Shoot Out	3R	1R	2R	1R	3R	1R	
Scottish Open	A	A	A	A	LQ	LQ	
German Masters	A	A	A	1R	LQ	LQ	
Welsh Open	A	A	A	LQ	1R	LQ	
World Grand Prix	DNQ	DNQ	DNQ	DNQ	DNQ	DNQ	
Players Championship	DNQ	DNQ	DNQ	DNQ	DNQ	DNQ	
World Open	Not Held			A	LQ	LQ	
Tour Championship	DNQ	DNQ	DNQ	DNQ	DNQ	DNQ	
World Championship	A	A	LQ	LQ	LQ	LQ	
Former ranking tournaments
WST Pro Series	RR	Tournament Not Held					
Turkish Masters	NH	LQ	Tournament Not Held				
Gibraltar Open	1R	1R	Tournament Not Held				
WST Classic	Not Held		3R	Tournament Not Held			
European Masters	A	A	1R	LQ	Not Held		
Saudi Arabia Masters	Tournament Not Held				3R	2R	NH

Performance Table Legend
LQ	lost in the qualifying draw	#R	lost in the early rounds of the tournament (WR = Wildcard round, RR = Round robin)	QF	lost in the quarter-finals
SF	lost in the semi-finals	F	lost in the final	W	won the tournament
DNQ	did not qualify for the tournament	A	did not participate in the tournament	WD	withdrew from the tournament

NH / Not Held	means an event was not held.
NR / Non-Ranking Event	means an event is/was no longer a ranking event.
R / Ranking Event	means an event is/was a ranking event.
MR / Minor-Ranking Event	means an event is/was a minor-ranking event.
