= Fang Xiongman =

Chinese snooker player

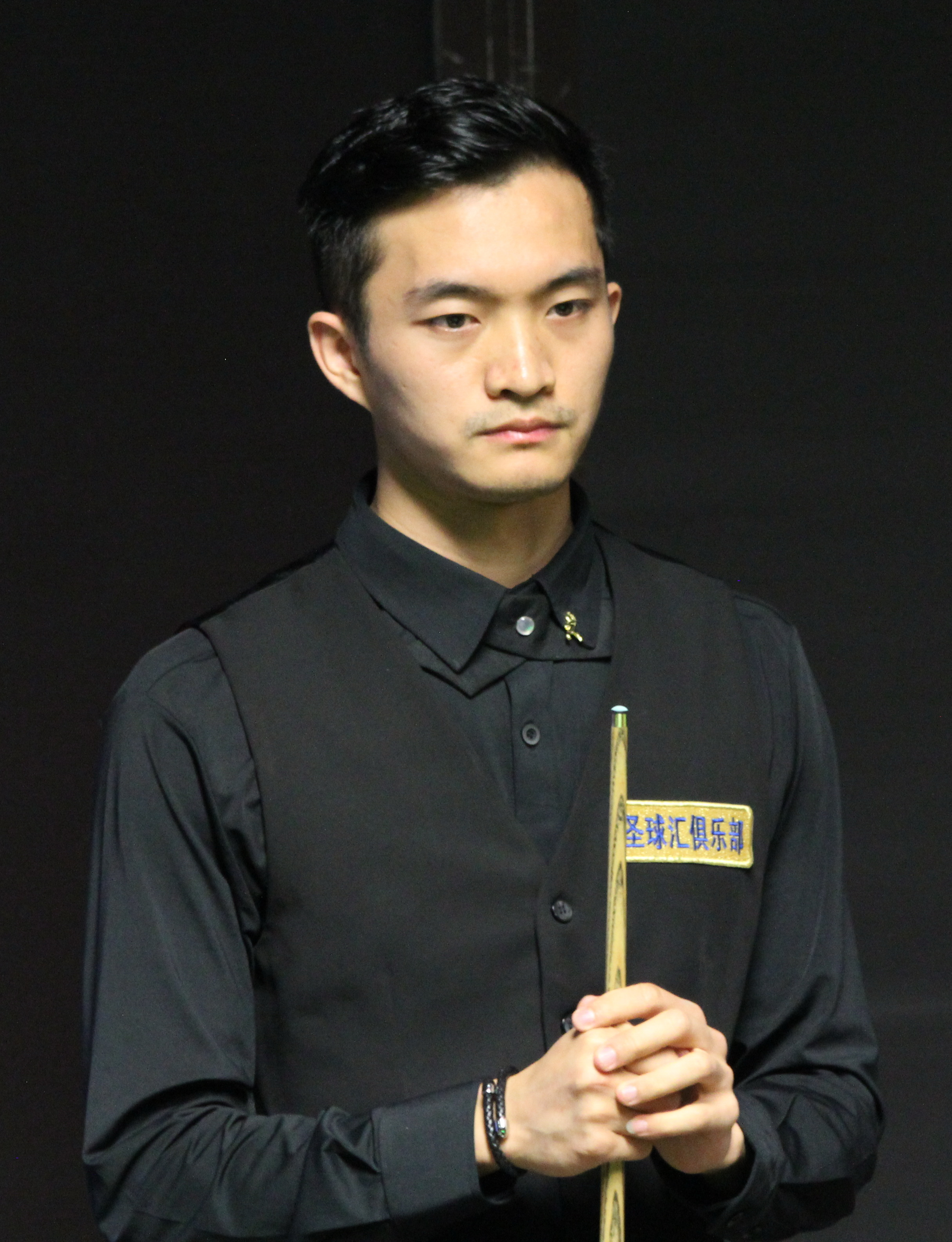
- Paul Hunter Classic 2017

Personal information
- Born: 9 April 1993 (age 33) Baise, Guangxi, China

Sport
- Country: China
- Sport: Snooker
- Professional: 2016–2018
- Highest ranking: 82 (June 2017)
- Best ranking finish: Last 16 (x1)

Fang Xiongman (Chinese: 方雄慢; pinyin: Fāng Xióngmàn, born 9 April 1993) is a Chinese former professional snooker player.

== Career ==
Fang began competing at professional events in 2012, which included Asian Tour events as well as wildcard rounds of ranking tournaments. His most notable win as an amateur came at the 2015 Shanghai Masters, where he defeated Jamie Jones 5–1 in the wildcard round, but went on to get eliminated 5–2 by Stuart Bingham in the last 32.

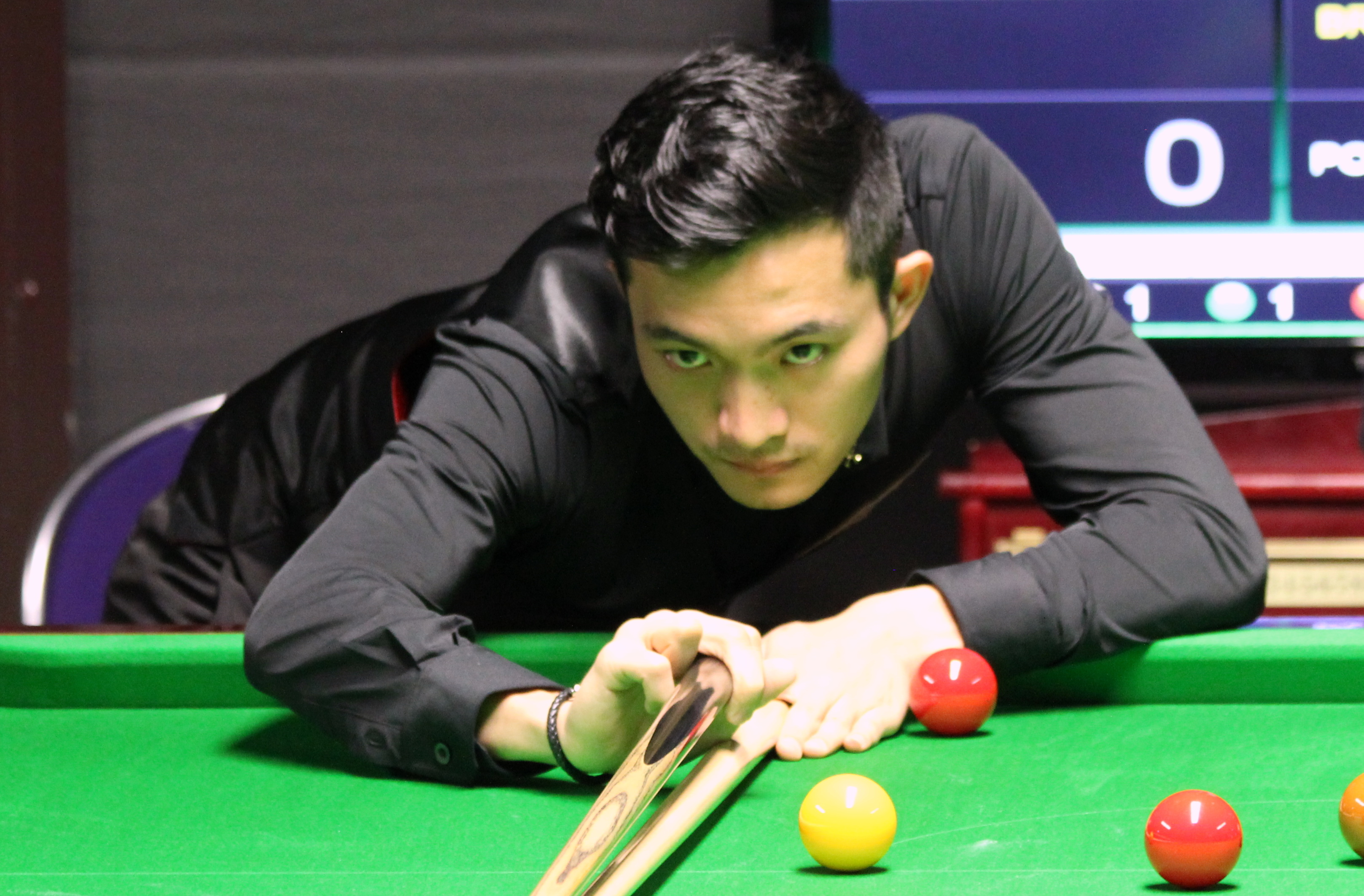
2017 Paul Hunter Classic

In 2016, Fang managed to receive a two-year tour card for the 2016–17 and 2017–18 seasons after qualifying through 2016 Q School, beating Daniel Womersley 4–3 in the final round of the first event. The Riga Masters was the first ranking event of the year and he qualified for it by overcoming Stephen Maguire 4–2, before losing in the opening round 4–3 to Andy Hicks. Fang's first win of his career at the venue stage of a ranking was a 4–2 success over Martin O'Donnell at the Scottish Open. He exited the tournament 4–0 to Mark Allen in the second round.

He dropped off the tour at the end of the 2017/18 season and did not succeed in winning back a place through the 2018 Q School.

== Performance and rankings timeline ==
Tournament	2012/ 13	2013/ 14	2014/ 15	2015/ 16	2016/ 17	2017/ 18	2018/ 19	2019/ 20
Ranking (Note: It shows the ranking at the beginning of the season.)	(Note: He was an amateur.)				(Note: New players on the Main Tour don't have a ranking.)	80		
Ranking tournaments
Riga Masters (Note: The event was called the Riga Open (2014/2015–2015/2016))	Not Held		Minor-Rank.		1R	LQ	A	A
International Championship	A	A	A	WR	LQ	LQ	A	A
China Championship	Tournament Not Held				NR	LQ	A	A
English Open	Tournament Not Held				A	2R	A	A
World Open	A	A	Not Held		LQ	LQ	A	A
Northern Ireland Open	Tournament Not Held				1R	2R	A	A
UK Championship	A	A	A	A	1R	1R	A	A
Scottish Open	Tournament Not Held				2R	2R	A	A
European Masters	Tournament Not Held				LQ	1R	A	A
German Masters	A	A	A	A	LQ	LQ	A	A
World Grand Prix	Not Held		NR	DNQ	DNQ	DNQ	DNQ	DNQ
Welsh Open	A	A	A	A	1R	3R	A	A
Shoot-Out	Non-Ranking Event				2R	1R	A	A
Players Championship (Note: The event was called the Player Tour Championship Grand Finals (2012/2013) and the Players Championship Grand Final (2013/2014−2015/2016))	DNQ	DNQ	DNQ	DNQ	DNQ	DNQ	DNQ	DNQ
Gibraltar Open	Tournament Not Held			MR	2R	4R	A	A
Tour Championship	Tournament Not Held						DNQ	DNQ
World Championship	A	A	A	A	LQ	LQ	A	A
Non-ranking tournaments
Haining Open	Not Held		MR		A	A	1R	1R
Former ranking tournaments
Shanghai Masters	A	WR	A	1R	LQ	LQ	NR	
Paul Hunter Classic	Minor-Ranking Event				A	2R	A	NR
Indian Open	NH	A	A	NH	WR	LQ	A	NH
China Open	A	A	A	A	LQ	LQ	A	NH

Performance Table Legend
LQ	lost in the qualifying draw	#R	lost in the early rounds of the tournament (WR = Wildcard round, RR = Round robin)	QF	lost in the quarter-finals
SF	lost in the semi-finals	F	lost in the final	W	won the tournament
DNQ	did not qualify for the tournament	A	did not participate in the tournament	WD	withdrew from the tournament

NH / Not Held	means an event was not held.
NR / Non-Ranking Event	means an event is/was no longer a ranking event.
R / Ranking Event	means an event is/was a ranking event.
MR / Minor-Ranking Event	means an event is/was a minor-ranking event.
