= Mitchell Mann =

English snooker player (born 1991)

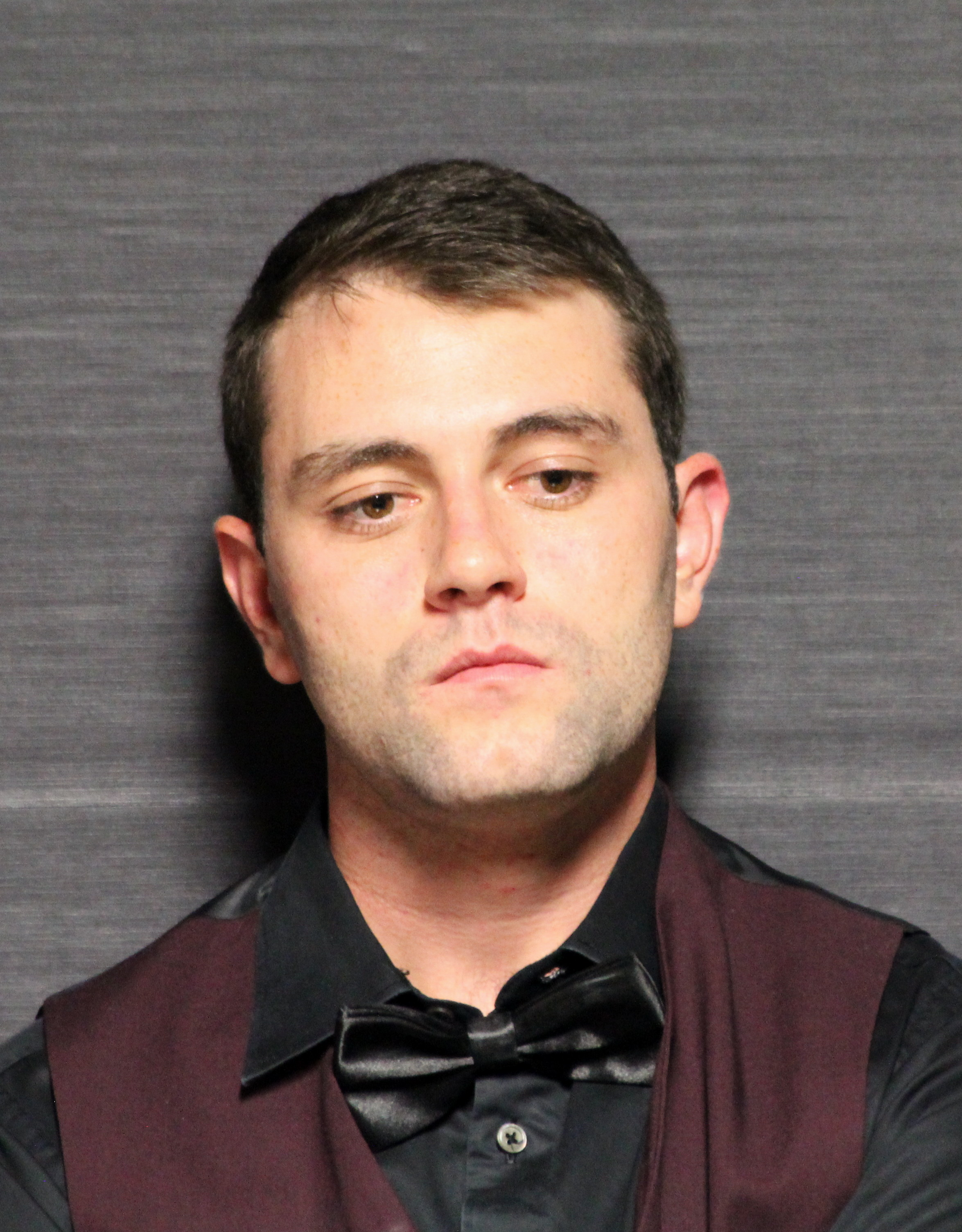
- Paul Hunter Classic 2016

Personal information
- Born: 26 December 1991 (age 34) Birmingham, England

Sport
- Country: England
- Sport: Snooker
- Professional: 2014–2018, 2019–2023, 2024–present
- Highest ranking: 70 (May 2016)
- Current ranking: 90 (as of 7 November 2026)
- Best ranking finish: Semi-final (2017 Paul Hunter Classic)

Mitchell Dennis Mann (born 26 December 1991) is an English professional snooker player.

== Career ==
=== Junior ===
Mann first played snooker aged 9, after being forced to quit football after a diagnosis of Legg–Calvé–Perthes syndrome, a rare disease which rots the hip bone in young boys. The main highlight of his junior career was winning the Junior Pot Black in 2007, beating Jack Lisowski 76–23 in the final.

=== Amateur ===
In 2007–08, Mann at aged 15 began to play in the secondary International Open Series tour with eight places on the professional snooker tour on offer to the top eight in the end of season Order of Merit. In 2008–09, Mann was ranked 11th in the Order of Merit and 46th in 2009–10.

For 2010–11, the PIOS was dropped and replaced by the pro-am Players Tour Championship and an end-of season Q School became the new pro ticket events. In the PTC events, Mann managed several wins against professional players Liang Wenbo, Michael White, Dave Harold and Shaun Murphy notable casualties. He also qualified for main qualifying stages of the 2010 World Open professional ranking tournament through the Landywood Snooker Centre tournament, losing 0–3 to Ben Woollaston in round 1.

Mann was also a regular competitor in the Q School events, where several two-year tour cards were on offer to semi-finalists in each event. Mann came close the third event of the 2012 Q School to winning a tour place, lost a deciding frame to Robbie Williams. This performance however, enabled Mann to be a top up player for 2012 Australian Goldfields Open professional ranking event, where he reached the third round last 64 stage. He also played in the 2013 event via the same method, but lost 5–1 to Stuart Carrington in first round last 128 stage.

=== Professional ===
Mann won a two-year card on the professional World Snooker Tour for the 2014–15 and 2015–16 seasons in June 2014 after winning the 2014 EBSA European Snooker Championships, beating John Whitty 7–2 in the final. He missed the first two ranking tournaments of 2014–15 season as this win came after the qualifying rounds of those events. He picked up his first win on the tour by edging experienced player Peter Lines 6–5 in qualifying for the International Championship. He came through a wildcard round match 6–1 against Niu Zhuang and then made a 142 break during a 6–5 win over Wang Zepeng. In Mann's deepest run in a ranking event to date he lost 6–4 to Michael White in the last 32. He was knocked out in the first round of both the UK Championship and Welsh Open. Mann saw off Alfie Burden 10–4 in World Championship qualifying and won three frames in a row, after Gerard Greene had come from 4–0 down to trail 7–6, to beat him 10–6. He required one more win to reach the biggest tournament in snooker, but lost 10–6 to Alan McManus. Mann was the world number 88 at the end of his first season on tour.

Mann defeated Zhou Yuelong 4–2 at the Welsh Open and then narrowly lost 4–3 to Shaun Murphy. At the final European Tour event, the Gdynia Open, Mann eliminated Sanderson Lam 4–3, Rhys Clark 4–3 (having been 3–0 down) and Jack Lisowski 4–2 to reach the last 16 where he lost 4–1 to Marco Fu. This performance helped him finish 45th on the Order of Merit to earn a new two-year place on the snooker tour. He qualified for the China Open, but was whitewashed 5–0 by Rory McLeod in the first round. By beating Kishan Hirani 10–7 and Matthew Selt 10–9, Mann was one win away from playing in the World Championship and he did so by edging out Dechawat Poomjaeng 10–9. The world number 74 Mann was the lowest ranked player in the event and the only debutant and he went 2–1 up early on against Mark Allen, before struggling with his technique to lose 10–3.

After winning just two of his 11 matches before the 2016 UK Championship, Mann described his 6–3 first round victory over Kyren Wilson as a massive relief. He then beat Sam Baird 6–2, before falling 6–3 to Zhang Anda in the third round. At the Scottish Open he eliminated Baird 4–2 and Anthony McGill 4–1, but then lost 4–1 to Sean O'Sullivan. Mann reached the last 32 of an event for the third time this season when he overcame Michael Holt 4–1 and O'Sullivan 4–2 at the Welsh Open and he was defeated 4–2 by Kurt Maflin. Having dropped off the tour at the end of the 2017/18 season he entered the 2018 Q School. However, he lost in the first round of the first event to former professional Michael Judge. He then lost in the subsequent q school events, thus ensuring that he will have to wait another year before attempting to regain professional status.

On 3 May 2019, it was announced by World Snooker that Mann would receive a two-year tour card to return to the professional tour for the two seasons 2019–20 season and 2020/21. In June 2021 he secured a spot on the 21-22 and 22–23 seasons via the 2021 Q School Order of Merit.

== Performance and rankings timeline ==
| Tournament | 2010/ 11 | 2011/ 12 | 2012/ 13 | 2013/ 14 | 2014/ 15 | 2015/ 16 | 2016/ 17 | 2017/ 18 | 2018/ 19 | 2019/ 20 | 2020/ 21 | 2021/ 22 | 2022/ 23 | 2024/ 25 | 2025/ 26 | 2026/ 27 |
|---|---|---|---|---|---|---|---|---|---|---|---|---|---|---|---|---|
| Ranking (Note: It shows the ranking at the beginning of the season) | (Note: He was an amateur) | | | | (Note: New players don't have a ranking) | 88 | (Note: Players qualified through European Tour Order of Merit started the season without prize money ranking points) | 75 | | | 73 | (Note: Players qualified through Q School started the season without prize money ranking points) | 72 | | 86 | |
Ranking tournaments
| Championship League | Non-Ranking Event | | | | | | | | | | RR | RR | RR | RR | RR | RR |
| China Open | A | A | A | A | LQ | 1R | LQ | LQ | A | Tournament Not Held | | | | | | LQ |
| Wuhan Open | Tournament Not Held | | | | | | | | | | | | | LQ | LQ | LQ |
| British Open | Tournament Not Held | | | | | | | | | | | 1R | 1R | LQ | QF | 1R |
| English Open | Tournament Not Held | | | | | | 1R | 2R | A | 1R | 1R | LQ | LQ | LQ | LQ | LQ |
| Shenzhen Open (Note: The event was called the Xi'an Grand Prix (2024/2025–2025/2026)) | Tournament Not Held | | | | | | | | | | | | | LQ | LQ | LQ |
| Northern Ireland Open | Tournament Not Held | | | | | | 2R | 1R | A | 2R | 1R | QF | LQ | LQ | LQ | LQ |
| International Championship | Not Held | | A | A | 2R | LQ | LQ | LQ | A | LQ | Not Held | | | LQ | 1R | 2R |
| UK Championship | A | A | A | A | 1R | 1R | 3R | 2R | A | 1R | 1R | 1R | LQ | LQ | LQ | |
| Shoot Out | Non-Ranking Event | | | | | | 1R | 1R | 2R | 1R | 2R | 4R | 1R | 1R | 3R | |
| Scottish Open | Not Held | | MR | Not Held | | | 3R | 2R | A | 1R | 1R | 1R | 1R | LQ | LQ | LQ |
| German Masters | A | A | A | A | LQ | LQ | LQ | LQ | A | 2R | LQ | LQ | LQ | LQ | LQ | LQ |
| Welsh Open | A | A | A | A | 1R | 2R | 3R | 1R | A | 2R | 1R | 2R | 1R | LQ | 1R | |
| World Grand Prix | Tournament Not Held | | | | NR | DNQ | DNQ | DNQ | DNQ | DNQ | DNQ | DNQ | DNQ | DNQ | DNQ | |
| Players Championship (Note: The event was called the Players Tour Championship Grand Final (2010/2011–2015/2016)) | DNQ | DNQ | DNQ | DNQ | DNQ | DNQ | DNQ | DNQ | DNQ | DNQ | DNQ | DNQ | DNQ | DNQ | DNQ | |
| World Open | LQ | A | A | A | Not Held | | LQ | LQ | A | LQ | Not Held | | | LQ | LQ | |
| Tour Championship | Tournament Not Held | | | | | | | | DNQ | DNQ | DNQ | DNQ | DNQ | DNQ | DNQ | |
| World Championship | A | A | A | A | LQ | 1R | LQ | LQ | LQ | LQ | LQ | LQ | LQ | LQ | LQ | |
Non-ranking tournaments
| Championship League | A | A | A | A | A | A | A | A | A | RR | A | A | A | A | A | |
Former ranking tournaments
| Australian Goldfields Open | A | A | LQ | LQ | A | LQ | Tournament Not Held | | | | | | | | | |
| Shanghai Masters | A | A | A | A | LQ | LQ | LQ | 1R | Non-Ranking | | Not Held | | | Non-Ranking Event | | |
| Paul Hunter Classic | Minor-Ranking Event | | | | | | 1R | SF | A | NR | Tournament Not Held | | | | | |
| Indian Open | Not Held | | | A | LQ | NH | 1R | LQ | LQ | Tournament Not Held | | | | | | |
| Riga Masters (Note: The event was called the Riga Open (2014/2015–2015/2016)) | Tournament Not Held | | | | Minor-Ranking | | LQ | LQ | WD | LQ | Tournament Not Held | | | | | |
| China Championship | Tournament Not Held | | | | | | NR | LQ | A | 2R | Tournament Not Held | | | | | |
| WST Pro Series | Tournament Not Held | | | | | | | | | | RR | Tournament Not Held | | | | |
| Turkish Masters | Tournament Not Held | | | | | | | | | | | LQ | Tournament Not Held | | | |
| Gibraltar Open | Tournament Not Held | | | | | MR | 2R | 2R | A | 1R | 3R | 2R | Tournament Not Held | | | |
| European Masters | Tournament Not Held | | | | | | LQ | 1R | A | LQ | 1R | 2R | 1R | Not Held | | |
| WST Classic | Tournament Not Held | | | | | | | | | | | | 1R | Not Held | | |
| Saudi Arabia Masters | Tournament Not Held | | | | | | | | | | | | | 1R | 1R | NH |
Former non-ranking tournaments
| Six-red World Championship | A | NH | A | A | A | A | A | A | A | A | Not Held | | LQ | Not Held | | |

Performance Table Legend
| LQ | lost in the qualifying draw | #R | lost in the early rounds of the tournament (WR = Wildcard round, RR = Round robin) | QF | lost in the quarter-finals |
| SF | lost in the semi-finals | F | lost in the final | W | won the tournament |
| DNQ | did not qualify for the tournament | A | did not participate in the tournament | WD | withdrew from the tournament |

| NH / Not Held | means an event was not held. |
| NR / Non-Ranking Event | means an event is/was no longer a ranking event. |
| R / Ranking Event | means an event is/was a ranking event. |
| MR / Minor-Ranking Event | means an event is/was a minor-ranking event. |

== Career finals ==
=== Pro-am finals: 1 ===
| Outcome | No. | Year | Championship | Opponent in the final | Score |
|---|---|---|---|---|---|
| Runner-up | 1. | 2009 | Pontins Pro-Am - Event 1 | (England) Andrew Norman | 2–5 |

=== Amateur finals: 4 (3 titles) ===
| Outcome | No. | Year | Championship | Opponent in the final | Score |
|---|---|---|---|---|---|
| Winner | 1. | 2007 | Junior Pot Black | (England) Jack Lisowski | 1–0 |
| Winner | 2. | 2014 | European Snooker Championship | (England) John Whitty | 7–2 |
| Runner-up | 1. | 2018 | Challenge Tour – Event 2 | (England) David Grace | 0–3 |
| Winner | 3. | 2018 | Challenge Tour – Event 4 | (Wales) Dylan Emery | 3–0 |
