= Leicester Arena =

Event venue in England

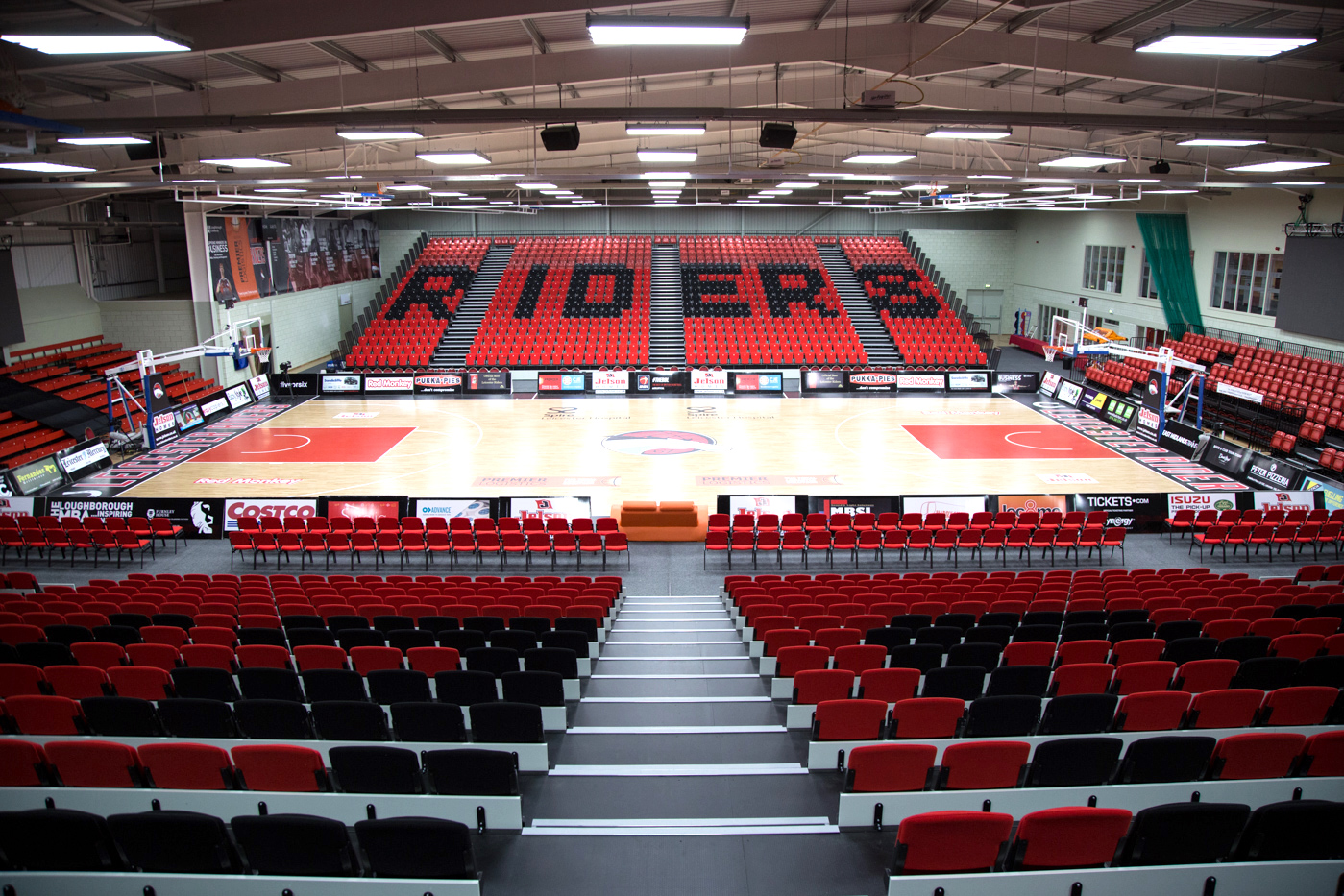
- Leicester Arena, home to the Leicester Riders.
- Interactive map of Leicester Arena
- Location: Leicester, United Kingdom
- Coordinates: 52.64389°N 1.13097°W
- Owner: Leicester Riders Foundation
- Operator: LCSA Limited
- Capacity: Concerts: 3,000; Basketball: 2,400

Construction
- Opened: January 2016

Tenant
- Leicester Riders (2016–present)

The Leicester Arena (officially known as the Mattioli Arena due to sponsorship reasons) is a multi-purpose sports arena located in Leicester, England.

The arena has a seating capacity for 3,000 spectators and its main tenants are the Leicester Riders of the British Basketball League, whilst regularly hosting darts and snooker competitions.

From 2018 to 2024, the arena was known as Morningside Arena.

== Background ==
The £4.8 million arena, which is owned by the Leicester Riders Foundation, was officially opened in January 2016. It is used as the home venue for the basketball team Leicester Riders, as well as the wheelchair basketball team the Leicester Cobras. It is also used by the students of Leicester College as well as by the local community. It hosted its first game on 30 January 2016, in a quarter-final match between Leicester Riders and Surrey Scorchers in the British Basketball League Trophy, won by the Riders 77–60.

In 2018 Morningside Pharmaceuticals agreed to take the naming rights of the venue for three years, rebranding the arena as Morningside Arena.

The venue hosted the 2019 Champions League of Darts and the 2021 British Open in snooker.

On 9 February 2024, the arena was rebranded as Mattioli Arena following a naming agreement with the Ian & Clare Mattioli Charitable Trust.

== International basketball matches ==
Date	Competition	Home team	Result	Away team	Ref.
24 November 2017	2019 FIBA World Cup Qualifier	Great Britain	92–95 (ot)	Greece	

== Other major sports events ==
Date	Competition	Winner(s)	Ref.
19–20 October 2019	2019 Champions League of Darts	Michael van Gerwen (NED)	
16–22 August 2021	2021 British Open Snooker	Mark Williams (WAL)	
3–9 October 2021	2021 World Grand Prix Darts	Jonny Clayton (WAL)	
20–23 January 2022	2022 Snooker Shoot Out	Hossein Vafaei (IRN)	
25–28 January 2023	2023 Snooker Shoot Out	Chris Wakelin (ENG)	
19 December 2022 – 2 March 2023	2023 Championship League Snooker	John Higgins (SCO)	
16–22 March 2023	2023 WST Classic Snooker	Mark Selby (ENG)	
