= Snooker world rankings =

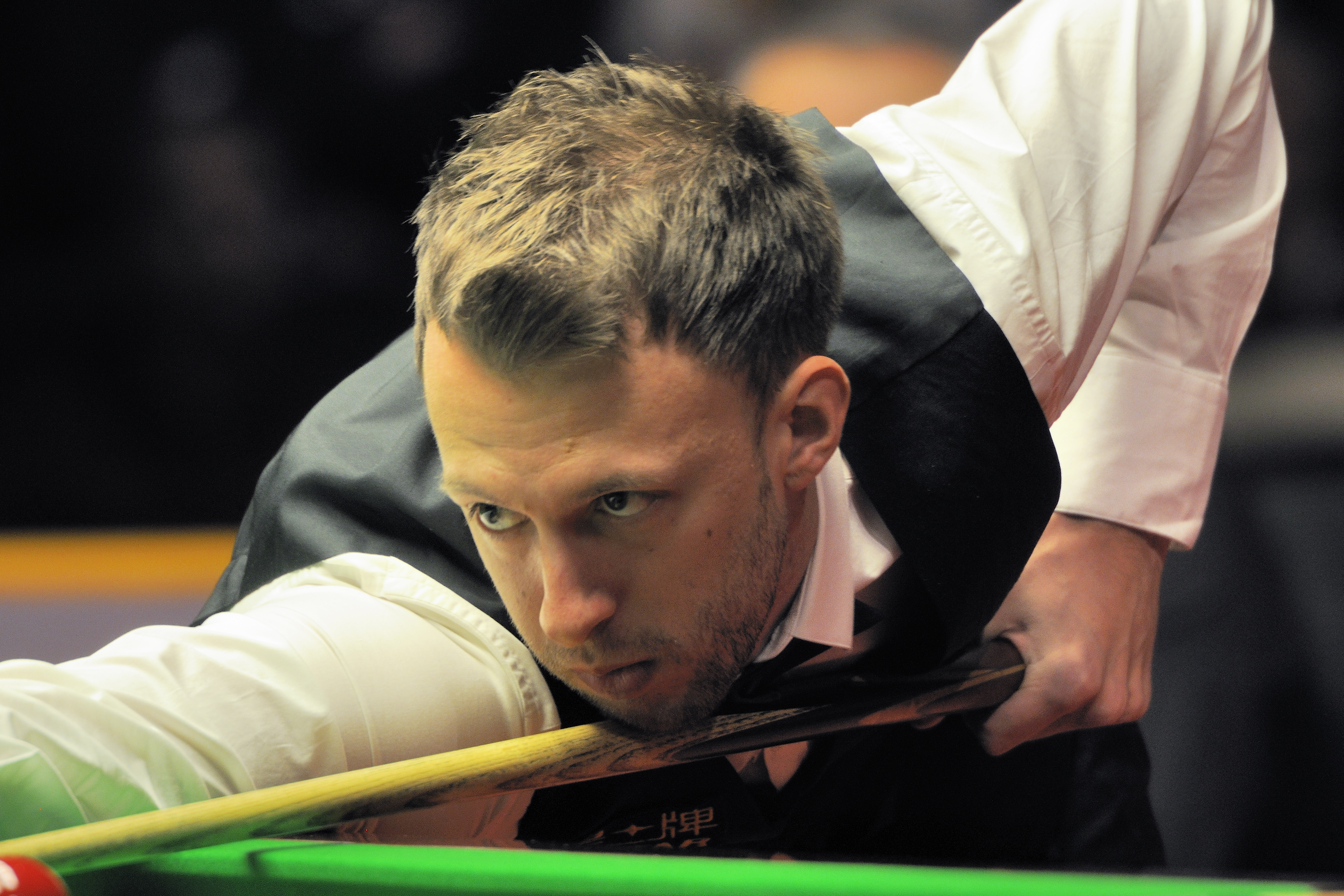
Judd Trump was the 2025-26 season's world number one in snooker

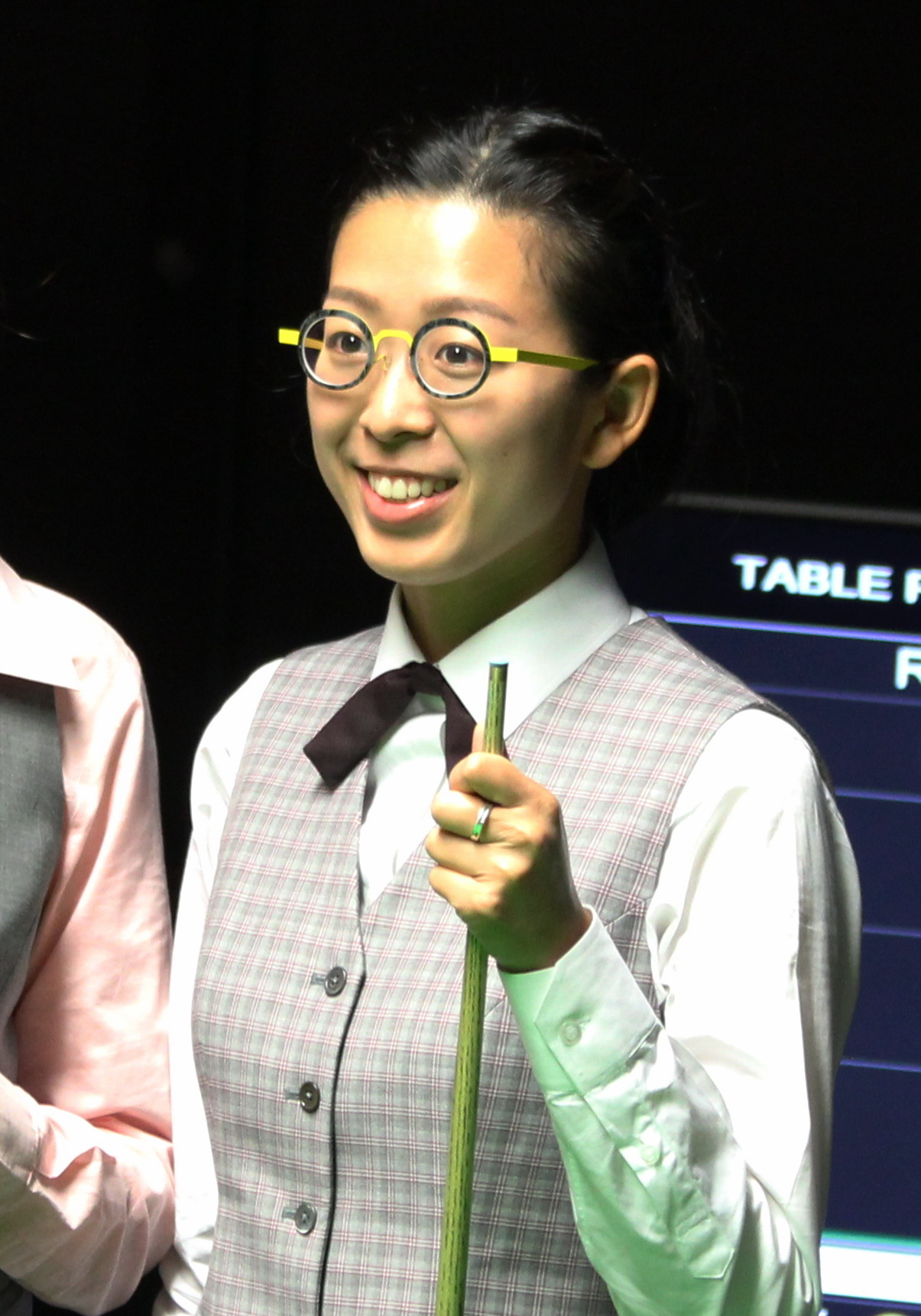
Ng On-yee was the 2025-26 season's women's world number one in snooker

The snooker world rankings are the official system of ranking professional snooker players to determine their qualification and seeding for events on the World Snooker Tour and other tournaments, as well as their future professional status on the tour.

Introduced in the 1976–77 season, world rankings are maintained by the sport's governing body, the World Professional Billiards and Snooker Association (WPBSA); Each player's world ranking is based on their performances, in terms of cumulative prize money earned in designated ranking tournaments over the preceding two years. Every professional member of the WPBSA is assigned a ranking disregarding their activeness on the circuit. The current number one in the world rankings is Zhao Xintong, who replaced Judd Trump on 30 August 2026.

Other forms of World Snooker rankings include the one-year list, which only calculates the current season's earnings to date to qualify for the Players Series events; the World Women's Snooker (WWS) has its own women's only rankings; the pre-season qualifying event Q School also produces a Q School Order of Merit rankings after each edition to decide the order of players topping up the main tour events when undersubscription of players occurs.

== Overview ==
Tournament players are decided by their ranking to determine their stage of entering into different events, with some involving qualification matches; Whilst lower-ranked players have to go through the early and untelevised rounds of the tournament, the top 16 ranked players automatically qualify for the final stages of tournaments such as the World Championship and the Masters. Therefore, there is typically a lot of interest in which players are likely to maintain or acquire "top 16 status", as well as the world number one in snooker. Conversely, players whose rank is below 64 at the end of the season are deemed relegated, being unable to retain professional status in the following year by ranking position.

=== Seedings and cut-off ===
Tournament seedings vary from tournament to tournament, but the defending champion is usually allocated the top seed followed by the reigning world champion and the remaining seeds are taken from a "seeding list". The introduction of the rolling rankings in 2010 facilitated updates to the seeding list throughout the season. Various "cut-off" points are selected at convenient stages during the season where the rankings are "frozen" and used as seedings for the following tournaments until the next revision.

=== Points distribution ===
Since the transition of world rankings from point-based tariffs set by the governing body to a prize money list for the 2014–15 season, different events of the same tournament series usually maintain a similar level of prize money. The Triple Crown and specifically the World Championship earn the player most points for rankings, whilst invitational event gains do not count into the rankings. The follow table shows the prize money from the round of 32 of the ranking events held during the 2026–27 season.

Prize money distribution of ranking events held during the 2026–27 season
Events	W	F	SF	QF	R16	R32
World Championship	500,000	200,000	100,000	50,000	30,000	20,000
UK Championship	312,000	125,000	62,500	31,250	18,750	12,500
China Open	250,000	100,000	50,000	25,000	15,000	10,000
Shenzhen Open	177,000	76,000	34,500	22,350	12,500	8,250
International Championship and World Open	175,000	75,000	33,000	22,000	14,000	9,000
Wuhan Open	175,000	75,000	33,000	22,000	12,000	8,000
British Open	100,000	45,000	20,000	12,000	9,000	6,000
Home Nations Series events	100,000	45,000	21,000	13,200	9,000	5,400
German Masters	100,000	45,000	21,000	13,200	9,000	5,400
Shoot Out	50,000	22,000	12,000	6,000	3,000	1,500

== History ==
Prior to the introduction of the world rankings, the previous year's winner and runner-up were allocated the top seedings in the World Championship, held annually. As more tournaments were added to the calendar and more players joined the circuit in the 1970s, it became increasingly necessary to seed the tournaments, precipitating the "Order of Merit" for the 1975–76 season. The system was very basic, with seedings based on the results of the last three World Championships with the winner awarded five points, the runner-up four, semi-finalists three, and so on down to one point for players who lost in the last 16. The world rankings, introduced in the following year, used the same allocation. The ranking point allocation was later revised slightly with winners of all bar the World Champion receiving six points, runners-up five, down to one point for the last 32; the World Championship more or less stayed as it was with ten points for the winner, incrementally reduced by two points for each preceding round, but now awarded one point for the last 32 in line with the other tournaments. In addition to ranking points, merit and frame points were also awarded which were used as a tie-break when players were on equal ranking points. By the 1982–83 season, the Professional Players Tournament and International Open were awarded ranking status and the World Championship awarded double points; the Classic carried ranking points from the 1983–84 season, the UK Championship and British Open from 1984–85. The revised system was now based on only the two previous seasons, and updated annually after the World Championship.

When the game went open for the 1991–92 season, the ranking point allocations, devised by the WPBSA chairman on the back of a cigarette pack, were altered by several factors to accommodate the influx of new players. The tie-break system was dropped but players remain awarded incrementally more points for each successive round; should a seeded player lose their first match, they would receive only half the points allocated to the non-seeded losers in that round. The World Championship continued to award more points than the other events, but under the "open era" the points allocation often varied between events; the UK Championship traditionally had the second-highest tariff until the abolishment of the ranking points schedule.

Before the introduction of live rankings from the 2009–10 season, rankings were updated once annually following the World Snooker Championship. The seedings for tournaments—with the exception of the top two seeds—followed the official season rankings. "Provisional rankings", which had no official status in the game, were therefore being utilised to give an indication of a player's form based on the combination of ranking points accumulated in the previous season and the current season thus far.

A weighted rankings points system was abolished from the 2014–15 snooker season, with the current ranking system based entirely on the prize money earned from ranking tournaments.

== Season rankings ==
=== World Snooker Tour ===
Johnstone's Paint WPBSA world rankings by the end of 2025-26 season
No.	Player	Points	Move
1	Judd Trump (ENG)	1,655,550	Steady
2	Neil Robertson (AUS)	1,210,550	▲1
3	Zhao Xintong (CHN)	1,176,550	▲8
4	Wu Yize (CHN)	1,120,900	▲16
5	John Higgins (SCO)	968,350	▼1
6	Shaun Murphy (ENG)	956,800	▲8
7	Mark Williams (WAL)	903,400	▼4
8	Kyren Wilson (ENG)	897,100	▼6
9	Mark Selby (ENG)	849,350	▼2
10	Barry Hawkins (ENG)	685,350	▼1
11	Xiao Guodong (CHN)	658,900	▲2
12	Mark Allen (NIR)	587,750	▼2
13	Chris Wakelin (ENG)	584,200	▲3
14	Ronnie O'Sullivan (ENG)	551,250	▼9
15	Ding Junhui (CHN)	464,850	▼9
16	Si Jiahui (CHN)	439,400	▼1

=== World Women's Snooker Tour ===
World Women's Snooker rankings by the end of 2025-26 season
No.	Player	Points	Move
1	Ng On-yee (HKG)	69,500	▲1
2	Bai Yulu (CHN)	67,750	▲1
3	Mink Nutcharut (THA)	65,375	▼2
4	Reanne Evans (ENG)	38,875	Steady
5	Narucha Phoemphul (THA)	27,625	▲6
6	Rebecca Kenna (ENG)	25,250	▼1
7	Panchaya Channoi (THA)	20,500	▲57
8	Anupama Ramachandran (IND)	18,875	▼2
9	Tessa Davidson (ENG)	13,250	▼1
10	Man Yan So (HKG)	12,125	▲5
11	Baipat Siripaporn (THA)	11,500	▼2
12	Ploychompoo Laokiatphong (THA)	11,000	▲81
13	Narantuya Bayarsaikhan (MNG)	10,750	▼1
14	Yee Ting Cheung (HKG)	6,200	Steady
15	Anna Prisjažņuka (LAT)	5,250	New
16	Amee Kamani (IND)	5,000	▼6

== See also ==
- List of snooker ranking tournaments
- List of world number one snooker players
