= 2022 Northern Ireland Open =

Snooker tournament

2022 BetVictor Northern Ireland Open
Tournament information
- Dates: 16–23 October 2022
- Venue: Waterfront Hall
- City: Belfast
- Country: Northern Ireland
- Organisation: World Snooker Tour
- Format: Ranking event
- Total prize fund: £427,000
- Winner's share: £80,000
- Highest break: Lu Ning (CHN) (141)

Final
- Champion: Mark Allen (NIR)
- Runner-up: Zhou Yuelong (CHN)
- Score: 9–4

The 2022 Northern Ireland Open (officially the 2022 BetVictor Northern Ireland Open) was a professional snooker tournament that took place from 16 to 23 October 2022 at the Waterfront Hall in Belfast, Northern Ireland. Organised by the World Snooker Tour, it was the fourth ranking event of the 2022–23 season, the first tournament in the Home Nations Series, and the third tournament in the BetVictor Series. It was the seventh edition of the Northern Ireland Open since the event was first staged in 2016. The tournament was broadcast on Quest and Eurosport domestically. The winner received £80,000 from a total prize purse of £427,000.

Mark Allen was the defending champion, having defeated John Higgins 9–8 in the final of the previous year's event. He successfully defended his title, winning eight consecutive frames in the final to defeat Zhou Yuelong 9–4. The win gave Allen the seventh ranking title of his career and qualified him for the following month's Champion of Champions invitational event.

Lu Ning made the tournament's highest break of 141 in his last-64 match against Hammad Miah.

== Format ==
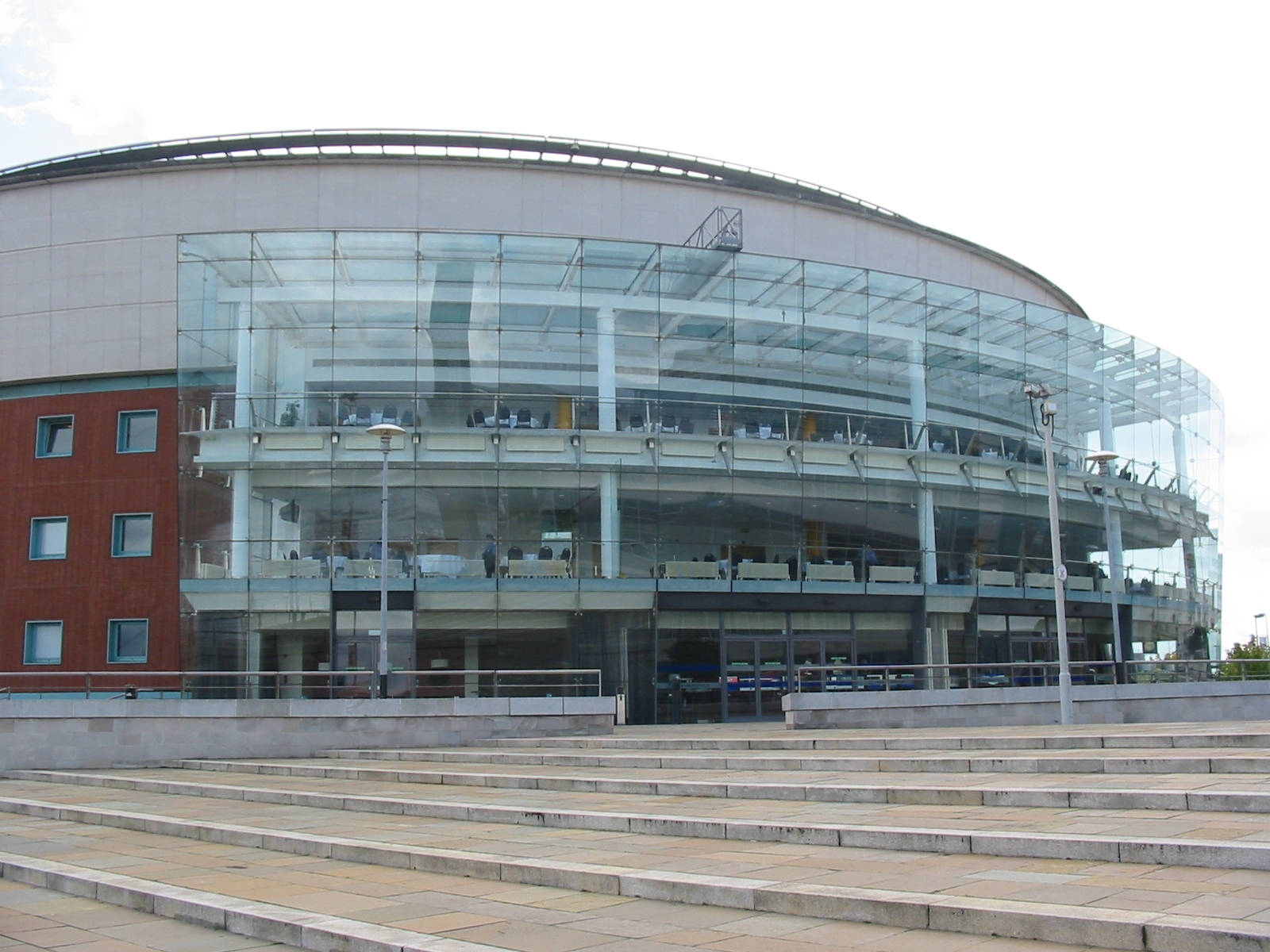
The event took place at the Waterfront Hall in Belfast.

The Northern Ireland Open was first played in 2016. The 2022 event was the seventh consecutive edition of the tournament. It was the first event in the season's Home Nations Series, the third event in the BetVictor Series, and the fourth world ranking tournament of the 2022–23 snooker season. It was staged from 16 to 23 October 2022 at the Waterfront Hall in Belfast, Northern Ireland. Qualifiers were played from 23 to 28 August 2022 at the Robin Park Leisure Centre in Wigan, England, although qualifiers featuring the top 16 seeds were held over and played at the Waterfront Hall.

The defending champion was Northern Irish player Mark Allen, who had won the previous year's event by defeating Scottish player John Higgins 9–8 in the final. All matches were played as the best of seven frames until the quarter-finals, which were played as the best of nine frames. The semi-finals were the best of 11 and the final best of 17 frames. Betting company BetVictor sponsored the event, which was broadcast on Quest in the United Kingdom; on Eurosport in the United Kingdom, Europe, India, Bangladesh, Bhutan, Maldives, Nepal, Pakistan and Sri Lanka; on Liaoning TV, Superstar online, Migu, Youku and Huya.com in China; on SportsCast in Indonesia; on TAP in the Philippines; on True Sport in Thailand; on Sports Cast in Taiwan; on Astro SuperSport in Malaysia; on DAZN in Canada; and by Matchroom Sport in all other territories.

=== Prize fund ===
The event featured a prize fund of £427,000, of which the winner received £80,000. The breakdown of prize money for this event is shown below:

- Winner: £80,000
- Runner-up: £35,000
- Semi-final: £17,500
- Quarter-final: £11,000
- Last 16: £7,500
- Last 32: £4,500
- Last 64: £3,000
- Highest break: £5,000
- Total: £427,000

== Summary ==
=== Qualification round ===
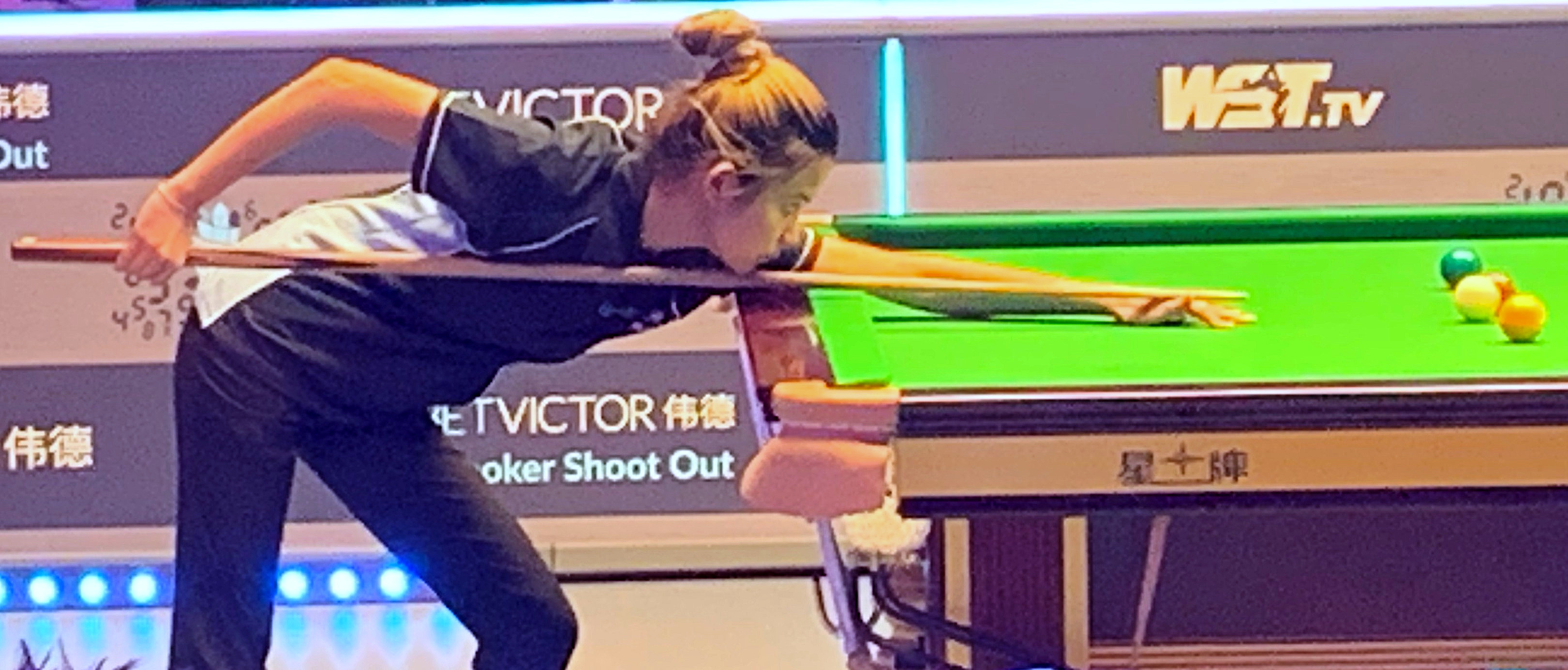
Thai player Mink Nutcharut won her first match on the professional tour in the qualifying round.

The qualifying round featured 128 players, with most matches played from 23 to 28 August 2022 at the Robin Park Leisure Centre in Wigan. Stephen Hendry withdrew from the qualifiers and was replaced in the draw by Zhao Jianbo. The reigning women's world champion Mink Nutcharut secured her first win on the professional tour as she defeated Mitchell Mann 4–2. The previous season's European Masters champion Fan Zhengyi won his first professional match in six months as he completed a whitewash over Ashley Hugill. Craig Steadman recovered from 2–3 behind to defeat Graeme Dott 4–3, while Northern Ireland's Jordan Brown whitewashed Andrew Pagett. Having recently turned 60, Jimmy White made a 132 break in the deciding frame to defeat Yuan Sijun 4–3 and win his second qualifying match of the season.

Matches featuring the top-16 seeds were held over and played at the Waterfront Hall on 16 and 17 October. Defending champion Allen made two centuries as he defeated Chang Bingyu 4–1, while the reigning world champion and world number one Ronnie O'Sullivan whitewashed Lukas Kleckers. Three-time champion Judd Trump won four consecutive frames to defeat Rod Lawler 4–1. Shaun Murphy whitewashed Xu Si, while Neil Robertson made breaks of 85, 120, and 55 as he whitewashed Fraser Patrick. Mark Selby defeated Reanne Evans 4–2, while the previous year's runner-up Higgins defeated Fergal O'Brien by the same score, winning two frames on the final black. Three top-16 seeds failed to reach the round of 64: seventh seed Zhao Xintong lost 1–4 to Lyu Haotian, 16th seed Ricky Walden lost by the same score to Xiao Guodong, and 12th seed Jack Lisowski lost 2–4 to Li Hang, despite making a 127 break in the fourth frame.

=== Early rounds ===
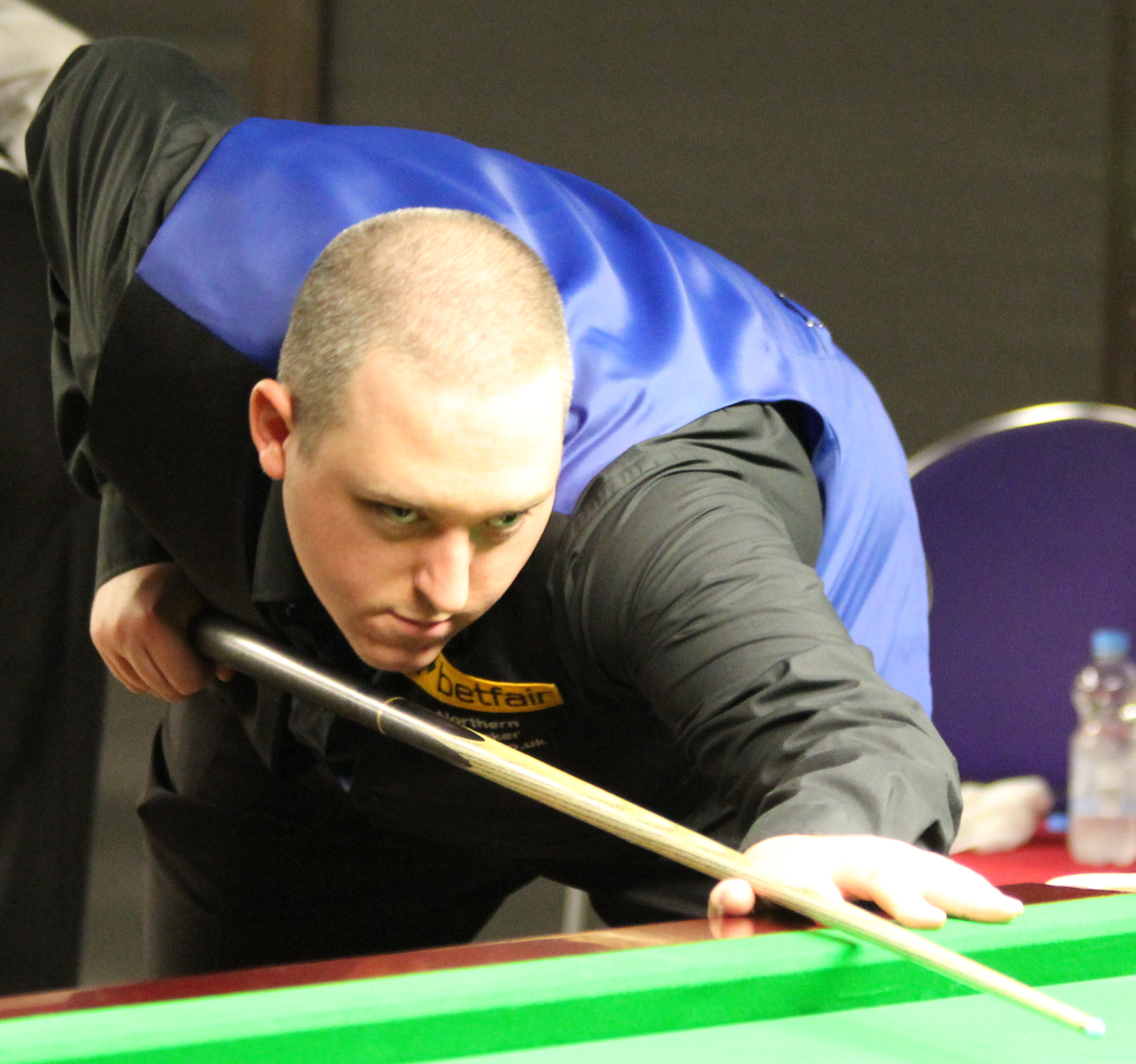
World number 49 David Grace (pictured) defeated the world number one Ronnie O'Sullivan in the round of 64.

The round of 64 was played from 17 to 19 October. The top two players in the world rankings exited the tournament at this stage. O'Sullivan won the first two frames against world number 49 David Grace, but Grace took the next three with breaks of 57, 94, and 64, helped by a fluke in the fifth frame. O'Sullivan won the sixth frame after Grace missed a black off the spot to tie the scores at 3–3, but Grace made a 51 break in the decider and then clinched the match 4–3 after O'Sullivan went in-off. O'Sullivan commented afterwards that he no longer had "passion and desire" for snooker and that it had "become like an emotionless-type job". World number two Trump suffered a 1–4 defeat to world number 95 Aaron Hill, who had lost his tour card after the 2022 World Snooker Championship but regained his professional status through Q School. World number 108 David Lilley whitewashed the number 14 seed Stuart Bingham.

Allen made breaks including 102, 85, and 92 as he whitewashed Chen Zifan in the round of 64. Neil Robertson defeated Fan, Selby defeated Sam Craigie, Mark Williams made a 139 break as he defeated Alexander Ursenbacher, and Brown defeated Thepchaiya Un-Nooh, all by 4–2 scorelines. Polish referee Monika Sulkowska was criticised for calling a foul against Craigie when he played a safety shot off the yellow ball in the fourth frame. Sulkowska stated that the cue ball had not hit the yellow, although replays showed the balls making contact. Luca Brecel whitewashed Jimmy White, who received a warning during the fourth frame for "gesticulating" after appearing to stick his finger up at referee Ben Williams. Speaking in commentary, Ronnie O'Sullivan said he believed the warning was "uncalled for". Ding Junhui lost in a deciding frame to Michael White. Jackson Page took a 3–2 lead over Higgins and made a 64 break in the sixth frame, but Higgins responded with a 69 clearance to tie the scores and then made a 124 break in the decider to win 4–3. Higgins praised Page afterwards, calling him a "great talent". Ninth seed Kyren Wilson also fell 2–3 behind against Sean O’Sullivan but recovered to win the match in a deciding frame.

The round of 32 was played on 19 and 20 October. Sixth seed Higgins lost 1–4 to Robert Milkins, who took a 3–1 lead by winning the fourth frame on a respotted black before clinching the match with a 63 break in the fifth. Murphy, the 11th seed, lost 2–4 to Zhou Yuelong, while the 15th seed and 2017 runner-up Yan Bingtao lost in a deciding frame to Anthony McGill. Neil Robertson defeated John Astley 4–1, while Li whitewashed Brown, Williams beat Jimmy Robertson 4–2, and Xiao defeated Hossein Vafaei in a decider. Allen lost the first two frames against world number 105 Andy Lee but won the next three to lead 3–2. Lee tied the scores with a 91 break in frame six but missed a key pot on the black in the decider, allowing Allen to clinch a 4–3 win. Michael White defeated 13th seed Barry Hawkins 4–2. David Gilbert made two centuries as he defeated Lilley, while Stephen Maguire defeated Kyren Wilson, and Tom Ford defeated Hill, all by 4–1 scorelines.

The round of 16 was played on 20 October. Selby and Michael White were tied at 2–2, but Selby produced a 132 break in the fifth frame and clinched a 4–2 win in the sixth. Williams made a 111 break in the first frame of his match against Maguire, who tied the scores with a 90 clearance in the second. Williams won the third frame, but Maguire produced back-to-back centuries of 123 and 107 to take a 3–2 lead. However, Williams won the last two frames with breaks of 77 and 69 to clinch a 4–3 win. Gilbert also defeated Ford 4–3, making a highest break of 132. Five other matches in the round of 16 ended in 4–0 whitewash victories for Neil Robertson over Li, Allen over Xiao, Zhou over Milkins, McGill over Tian Pengfei, and Lyu over 10th seed Brecel.

=== Quarter-finals ===
The quarter-finals were played on 21 October as the best of nine frames. Facing Selby, Neil Robertson took the first frame with a 73 break, but Selby won the next two, making a 95 break in the third. Robertson made a 97 in the fourth to tie the scores at 2–2 at the mid-session interval. Robertson won the fifth frame with an 84 break and made a break of 63 in the sixth. Selby had an opportunity to steal the sixth frame with a clearance but opted to lay a snooker on the final red due to the difficulty of gaining position on the black. However, Robertson escaped from the snooker, won the frame, and made breaks of 73 and 53 in the seventh to clinch a 5–2 victory. It was Robertson's sixth consecutive win over Selby.

Facing Allen, Williams won the first two frames with breaks of 62 and 70. Allen then won four frames in a row to take a 4–2 lead, with Williams scoring just 11 points in those frames. However, Williams won two 30-minute frames to tie the scores at 4–4 and take the match to a deciding frame. Allen led in the decider, but Williams had a chance to steal the frame with a clearance. However, he missed a shot on the black along the top cushion, allowing Allen to win the frame and match. Allen stated afterwards that he was having flashbacks to the 2018 China Open, when Williams had come from 60 points behind to defeat him in a deciding frame, but said he was fortunate to have had the support of his home crowd.

In the other quarter-finals, Zhou faced Gilbert while McGill faced Lyu. Gilbert made breaks of 84, 71, 60, and 55 as he moved into a 4–2 lead. However, he missed several opportunities to close out the match, and Zhou made breaks of 63 and 54 to draw level at 4–4. Zhou made a 130 break in the decider to win 5–4 and reach the fifth ranking semi-final of his career. McGill made breaks of 56, 95, 85, and 112 as he established a 4–3 lead. Lyu almost managed to take the match to a decider, as McGill required two snookers in the eighth frame. However, McGill secured the required points from snookers and won the frame for a 5–3 victory.

=== Semi-finals ===
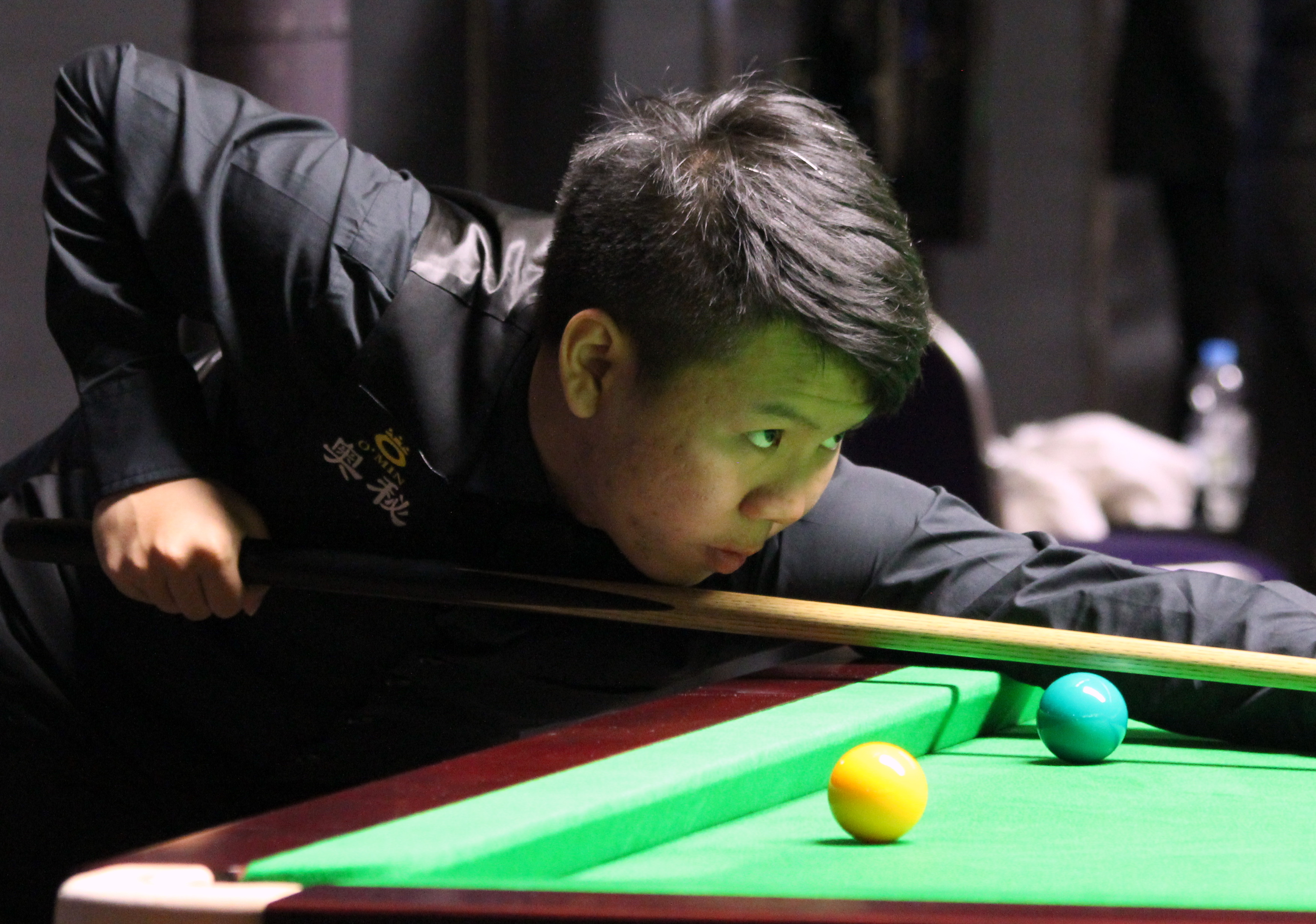
Chinese player Zhou Yuelong reached the third ranking final of his professional career.

The semi-finals were played on 22 October as the best of 11 frames. Allen faced Neil Robertson and took a 3–1 lead at the mid-session interval, making a 100 break in the fourth frame. After the interval, Allen made a second consecutive century of 136 to move 4–1 ahead. Robertson won the sixth frame with a 68 break, but Allen responded with a 60 break to win the seventh. In the eighth frame, Allen came from behind to clear the colours and force a respotted black. After a lengthy safety duel on the black ball, Allen made a long pot into the yellow pocket to win the match 6–2 and reach his second consecutive Northern Ireland Open final as well as a second consecutive ranking final, having been runner-up to Ryan Day at the 2022 British Open three weeks previously. "It was special winning the last frame the way I did as the atmosphere in those last few shots was phenomenal", Allen stated afterwards.

In the other semi-final, Zhou faced McGill. The first four frames were shared, with Zhou making a 100 break in the second frame. After the mid-session interval, Zhou made a 132 break to move into a 3–2 lead. However, McGill responded with a 73 break in the sixth after Zhou missed a red and made a 101 break in the seventh to move 4–3 ahead. Zhou won the eighth frame and snookered McGill at the beginning of the ninth, making a 127 break after McGill left a red available. Trailing 4–5, McGill had the chance to force a decider in the tenth but missed a shot on the blue. Zhou made a 110 break, clinched a 6–4 victory, and reached the third ranking final of his career. In all, the match featured five century breaks, four from Zhou and one from McGill. "If I win [the tournament], I will be happy to have made my dream come true", said Zhou, who added "It is important to not get under pressure, this is no good. You have to not think about the trophy and just play".

=== Final ===
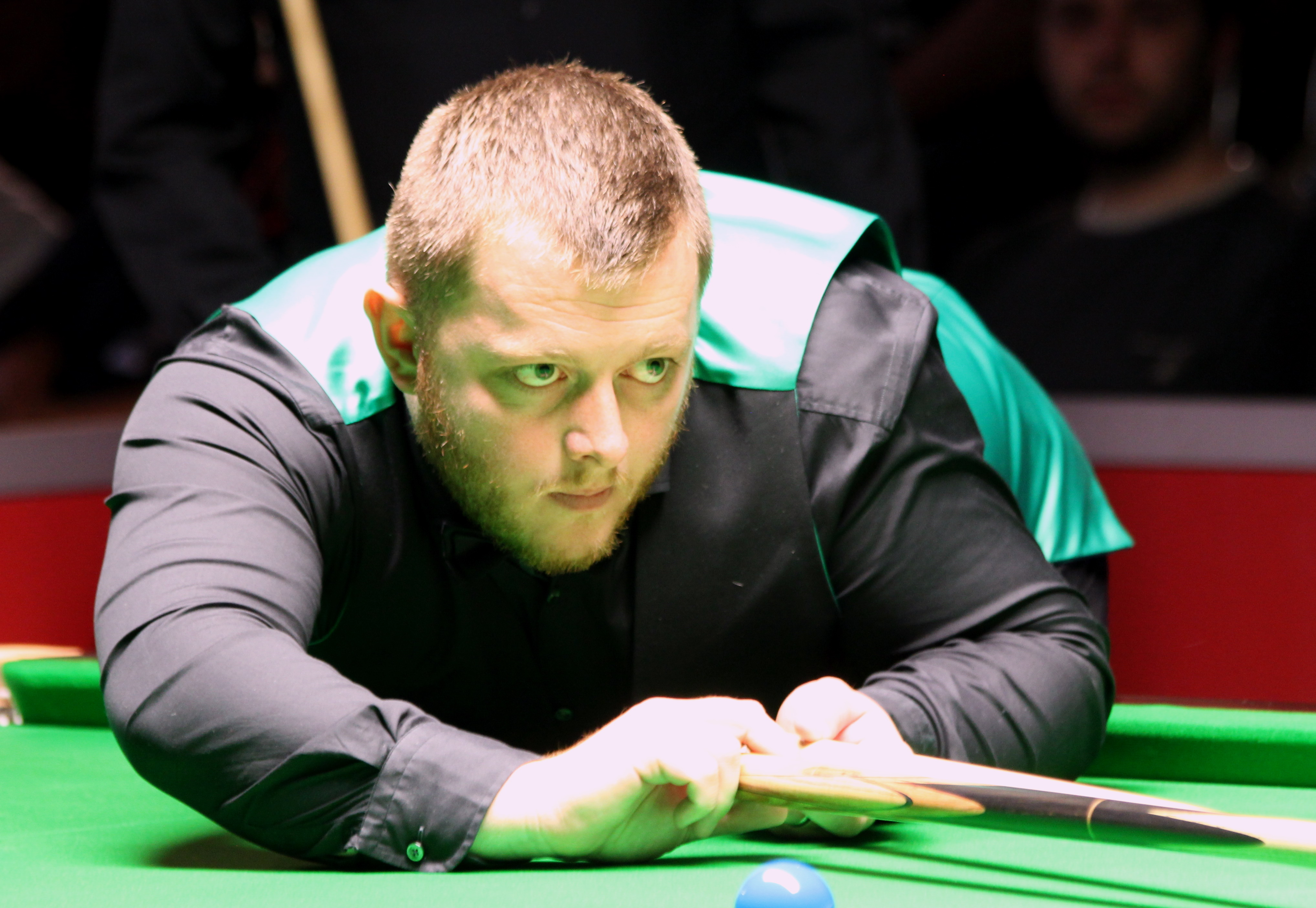
Northern Irish player Mark Allen won his second consecutive Northern Ireland Open title.

The final was played on 23 October as the best of 17 frames, held over two sessions, between world number 10 Allen and world number 23 Zhou. In the afternoon session, Allen won the first frame with a 57 break, but Zhou made breaks including 56 and 135 as he won the next four frames. In frame four, Zhou ran out of position and was warned by referee Leo Scullion after he spent more than two minutes considering his options for a safety shot. Jimmy White and Ronnie O'Sullivan criticised the warning in commentary, noting that other players had spent significantly longer over shots without the referee intervening. They cited a previous incident involving Scullion at the 2019 event, when Selby spent over six minutes on a shot without being warned. From 1–4 behind, Allen made breaks including 68 and 55 as he won the last three frames of the session to tie the scores at 4–4.

In the evening session, Allen made breaks of 53, 85, 50, and 51 to move 8–4 ahead before making a 109 clearance to win his eighth consecutive frame and clinch the title with a 9–4 victory. "You know how proud a Northern Irishman I am and how much I want to do well here for the fans. To win two years in a row is something. I just didn't think this day was ever going to happen", Allen commented afterwards. In addition to winning the seventh ranking title of his career, Allen secured the last remaining place at the following month's Champion of Champions invitational event. Zhou's defeat meant that he had lost all three of the ranking finals he had reached, having previously been runner-up at the January 2020 European Masters and the 2020 Snooker Shoot Out.

== Main draw ==
The results from the event are shown below. Seeded players have their seedings in brackets. Players highlighted in bold denote match winners.

=== Top half ===
**Last 64**; Best of 7 frames
**Mark Allen (NIR) (1)**	**4**
Chen Zifan (CHN)	0
**Andy Lee (HKG)**	**4**
Dylan Emery (WAL)	3
**Xiao Guodong (CHN)**	**4**
Mink Nutcharut (THA)	0
**Hossein Vafaei (IRN) (17)**	**4**
Craig Steadman (ENG)	1
Zak Surety (ENG)	3
**Stephen Maguire (SCO) (24)**	**4**
Sean O'Sullivan (ENG)	3
**Kyren Wilson (ENG) (9)**	**4**
Andy Hicks (ENG)	1
**Jimmy Robertson (ENG) (25)**	**4**
Alexander Ursenbacher (SUI)	2
**Mark Williams (WAL) (8)**	**4**
**Neil Robertson (AUS) (5)**	**4**
Fan Zhengyi (CHN)	2
Ben Woollaston (ENG)	3
**John Astley (ENG)**	**4**
**Li Hang (CHN)**	**4**
Si Jiahui (CHN)	0
**Jordan Brown (NIR) (21)**	**4**
Thepchaiya Un-Nooh (THA)	2
**Michael White (WAL)**	**4**
Ding Junhui (CHN)	3
Louis Heathcote (ENG)	0
**Barry Hawkins (ENG) (13)**	**4**
**Hammad Miah (ENG)**	**4**
Lu Ning (CHN) (29)	1
Sam Craigie (ENG)	2
**Mark Selby (ENG) (4)**	**4**

**Last 32**; Best of 7 frames
**(Northern Ireland) Mark Allen (1)**	**4**
(Hong Kong) Andy Lee	3
**(China) Xiao Guodong**	**4**
(Iran) Hossein Vafaei (17)	3
**(Scotland) Stephen Maguire (24)**	**4**
(England) Kyren Wilson (9)	1
(England) Jimmy Robertson (25)	2
**(Wales) Mark Williams (8)**	**4**
**(Australia) Neil Robertson (5)**	**4**
(England) John Astley	1
**(China) Li Hang**	**4**
(Northern Ireland) Jordan Brown (21)	0
**(Wales) Michael White**	**4**
(England) Barry Hawkins (13)	2
(England) Hammad Miah	2
**(England) Mark Selby (4)**	**4**

**Last 16**; Best of 7 frames
**(Northern Ireland) Mark Allen (1)**	**4**
(China) Xiao Guodong	0
(Scotland) Stephen Maguire (24)	3
**(Wales) Mark Williams (8)**	**4**
**(Australia) Neil Robertson (5)**	**4**
(China) Li Hang	0
(Wales) Michael White	2
**(England) Mark Selby (4)**	**4**

**Quarter-finals**; Best of 9 frames
**(Northern Ireland) Mark Allen (1)**	**5**
(Wales) Mark Williams (8)	4
**(Australia) Neil Robertson (5)**	**5**
(England) Mark Selby (4)	2

**Semi-finals**; Best of 11 frames
**(Northern Ireland) Mark Allen (1)**	**6**
(Australia) Neil Robertson (5)	2

=== Bottom half ===
**Last 64**; Best of 7 frames
Judd Trump (ENG) (3)	1
**Aaron Hill (IRL)**	**4**
**Tom Ford (ENG) (30)**	**4**
Scott Donaldson (SCO)	0
Stuart Bingham (ENG) (14)	0
**David Lilley (ENG)**	**4**
**David Gilbert (ENG) (19)**	**4**
Noppon Saengkham (THA)	1
Dominic Dale (WAL)	2
**Zhou Yuelong (CHN) (22)**	**4**
Jamie Clarke (WAL)	1
**Shaun Murphy (ENG) (11)**	**4**
Gerard Greene (NIR)	1
**Robert Milkins (ENG) (27)**	**4**
Jackson Page (WAL)	3
**John Higgins (SCO) (6)**	**4**
**Lyu Haotian (CHN)**	**4**
Mark King (ENG)	2
Joe Perry (ENG) (26)	0
**Daniel Wells (WAL)**	**4**
**Luca Brecel (BEL) (10)**	**4**
Jimmy White (ENG)	0
Matthew Selt (ENG) (23)	0
**Pang Junxu (CHN)**	**4**
Julien Leclercq (BEL)	1
**Anthony McGill (SCO) (18)**	**4**
Elliot Slessor (ENG)	0
**Yan Bingtao (CHN) (15)**	**4**
**Tian Pengfei (CHN)**	**4**
Martin Gould (ENG) (31)	3
**David Grace (ENG)**	**4**
Ronnie O'Sullivan (ENG) (2)	3

**Last 32**; Best of 7 frames
(Republic of Ireland) Aaron Hill	1
**(England) Tom Ford (30)**	**4**
(England) David Lilley	1
**(England) David Gilbert (19)**	**4**
**(China) Zhou Yuelong (22)**	**4**
(England) Shaun Murphy (11)	2
**(England) Robert Milkins (27)**	**4**
(Scotland) John Higgins (6)	1
**(China) Lyu Haotian**	**4**
(Wales) Daniel Wells	3
**(Belgium) Luca Brecel (10)**	**4**
(China) Pang Junxu	3
**(Scotland) Anthony McGill (18)**	**4**
(China) Yan Bingtao (15)	3
**(China) Tian Pengfei**	**4**
(England) David Grace	2

**Last 16**; Best of 7 frames
(England) Tom Ford (30)	3
**(England) David Gilbert (19)**	**4**
**(China) Zhou Yuelong (22)**	**4**
(England) Robert Milkins (27)	0
**(China) Lyu Haotian**	**4**
(Belgium) Luca Brecel (10)	0
**(Scotland) Anthony McGill (18)**	**4**
(China) Tian Pengfei	0

**Quarter-finals**; Best of 9 frames
(England) David Gilbert (19)	4
**(China) Zhou Yuelong (22)**	**5**
(China) Lyu Haotian	3
**(Scotland) Anthony McGill (18)**	**5**

**Semi-finals**; Best of 11 frames
**(China) Zhou Yuelong (22)**	**6**
(Scotland) Anthony McGill (18)	4

=== Final ===
Final: Best of 17 frames. Referee: Leo Scullion; Waterfront Hall, Belfast, Northern Ireland, 23 October 2022.
**Mark Allen** (1); Northern Ireland	**9**–4	Zhou Yuelong (22); China
Afternoon: **73**–1, 0–**89**, 0–**135** (135), 44–**84**, 36–**72**, **73**–24, **76**–1, **78**–3; Evening: **85**–40, **85**–0, **68**–8, **76**–33, **132**–0 (109)
109	Highest break	**135**
1	Century breaks	1

== Qualifying ==
Qualification for the tournament took place from 23 to 28 August 2022 at the Robin Park Leisure Centre in Wigan, England. Qualifying matches were played as the best of 7 frames. Players highlighted in bold denote match winners.

=== Wildcard Round ===
- Joel Connolly (NIR) 0–**4** **Robbie McGuigan** (NIR) (Note: Match held over and played in Belfast.)

=== Qualifying ===
- **Chen Zifan** (CHN) **4**–1 Ng On-yee (HKG)
- Jamie Jones (32) (WAL) 1–**4** **Andy Lee** (HKG)
- **Dylan Emery** (WAL) **4**–1 Cao Yupeng (CHN)
- Mitchell Mann (ENG) 2–**4** **Mink Nutcharut** (THA)
- **Hossein Vafaei (17)** (IRN) **4**–0 Mark Davis (ENG)
- Graeme Dott (SCO) 3–**4** **Craig Steadman** (ENG)
- **Zak Surety** (ENG) **4**–1 Himanshu Jain (IND)
- **Stephen Maguire (24)** (SCO) **4**–2 Oliver Brown (ENG)
- **Sean O'Sullivan** (ENG) **4**–1 Jamie O'Neill (ENG)
- **Andy Hicks** (ENG) **4**–1 Zhang Anda (CHN)
- **Jimmy Robertson (25)** (ENG) **4**–3 Gary Wilson (ENG)
- Mark Joyce (ENG) 0–**4** **Alexander Ursenbacher** (SUI)
- **Fan Zhengyi** (CHN) **4**–0 Ashley Hugill (ENG)
- Ryan Day (28) (WAL) 1–**4** **Ben Woollaston** (ENG)
- Wu Yize (CHN) 3–**4** **John Astley** (ENG)
- **Si Jiahui** (CHN) **4**–3 Anton Kazakov (UKR)
- **Jordan Brown (21)** (NIR) **4**–0 Andrew Pagett (WAL)
- Chris Wakelin (ENG) 2–**4** **Thepchaiya Un-Nooh** (THA)
- **Michael White** (WAL) **4**–2 Liam Highfield (ENG)
- Ali Carter (20) (ENG) 1–**4** **Ding Junhui** (CHN)
- **Louis Heathcote** (ENG) **4**–2 Dean Young (SCO)
- James Cahill (ENG) 2–**4** **Hammad Miah** (ENG)
- **Lu Ning (29)** (CHN) **4**–3 Jak Jones (WAL)
- Ryan Thomerson (AUS) 3–**4** **Sam Craigie** (ENG)
- **Aaron Hill** (IRL) **4**–0 Zhao Jianbo (CHN)
- **Tom Ford (30)** (ENG) **4**–1 Sanderson Lam (ENG)
- **Scott Donaldson** (SCO) **4**–1 Alfie Burden (ENG)
- **David Lilley** (ENG) **4**–3 Andres Petrov (EST)
- **David Gilbert (19)** (ENG) **4**–3 Ross Muir (SCO)
- **Noppon Saengkham** (THA) **4**–0 Ben Mertens (BEL)
- **Dominic Dale** (WAL) **4**–0 Rebecca Kenna (ENG)
- **Jamie Clarke** (WAL) **4**–2 Marco Fu (HKG)
- **Gerard Greene** (NIR) **4**–2 Barry Pinches (ENG)
- **Robert Milkins (27)** (ENG) **4**–1 Jenson Kendrick (ENG)
- Robbie Williams (ENG) 2–**4** **Jackson Page** (WAL)
- Oliver Lines (ENG) 3–**4** **Mark King** (ENG)
- **Joe Perry (26)** (ENG) **4**–3 Matthew Stevens (WAL)
- Adam Duffy (ENG) 0–**4** **Daniel Wells** (WAL)
- Yuan Sijun (CHN) 3–**4** **Jimmy White** (ENG)
- **Matthew Selt (23)** (ENG) **4**–1 Duane Jones (WAL)
- Steven Hallworth (ENG) 2–**4** **Pang Junxu** (CHN)
- Stuart Carrington (ENG) 1–**4** **Julien Leclercq** (BEL)
- **Anthony McGill (18)** (SCO) **4**–1 Peng Yisong (CHN)
- **Elliot Slessor** (ENG) **4**–2 Zhang Jiankang (CHN)
- Ian Burns (ENG) 0–**4** **Tian Pengfei** (CHN)
- **Martin Gould (31)** (ENG) **4**–0 Michael Judge (IRL)
- **David Grace** (ENG) **4**–2 Lei Peifan (CHN)

=== Held-over Matches: Round One ===
Matches involving the top 16 players — including the defending champion — alongside a wildcard match involving local players, were held over and played at the Waterfront Hall. Zhou Yuelong's match was also held over as he faced the winner of the wildcard match.

- **Mark Allen (1)** (NIR) **4**–1 Chang Bingyu (CHN)
- Ricky Walden (16) (ENG) 1–**4** **Xiao Guodong** (CHN)
- **Kyren Wilson (9)** (ENG) **4**–0 Ken Doherty (IRL)
- **Mark Williams (8)** (WAL) **4**–2 Peter Lines (ENG)
- **Neil Robertson (5)** (AUS) **4**–0 Fraser Patrick (SCO)
- Jack Lisowski (12) (ENG) 2–**4** **Li Hang** (CHN)
- **Barry Hawkins (13)** (ENG) **w/o**–w/d Farakh Ajaib (PAK)
- **Mark Selby (4)** (ENG) **4**–2 Reanne Evans (ENG)

- **Judd Trump (3)** (ENG) **4**–1 Rod Lawler (ENG)
- **Stuart Bingham (14)** (ENG) **4**–1 Allan Taylor (ENG)
- **Zhou Yuelong (22)** (CHN) **4**–1 Robbie McGuigan (NIR)
- **Shaun Murphy (11)** (ENG) **4**–0 Xu Si (CHN)
- **John Higgins (6)** (SCO) **4**–2 Fergal O'Brien (IRL)
- **Luca Brecel (10)** (BEL) **4**–0 Joe O'Connor (ENG)
- Zhao Xintong (7) (CHN) 1–**4** **Lyu Haotian** (CHN)
- **Yan Bingtao (15)** (CHN) **4**–2 Liang Wenbo (CHN)
- **Ronnie O'Sullivan (2)** (ENG) **4**–0 Lukas Kleckers (GER)

== Century breaks ==
=== Main stage centuries ===
During the event 69 century breaks were made.

- 141 – Lu Ning
- 139, 128, 111 – Mark Williams
- 139 – Gerard Greene
- 138, 103 – Yan Bingtao
- 136, 123, 109, 108, 102, 100 – Mark Allen
- 135, 132, 130, 130, 127, 121, 110, 100 – Zhou Yuelong
- 135, 120, 114, 107, 102 – Neil Robertson
- 134, 132, 132, 103 – David Gilbert
- 134, 123, 104 – Lyu Haotian
- 133, 132, 113, 112, 105, 101 – Anthony McGill
- 132 – Mark Selby
- 128 – Jackson Page
- 127 – Martin Gould
- 127 – Jack Lisowski
- 127 – Pang Junxu
- 126 – Kyren Wilson
- 124 – John Higgins
- 123, 107, 107, 102 – Stephen Maguire
- 118 – Alexander Ursenbacher
- 115 – David Grace
- 114, 109 – Judd Trump
- 111, 106 – Luca Brecel
- 111 – Sam Craigie
- 111 – Ding Junhui
- 110, 100 – Tom Ford
- 110 – Stuart Bingham
- 108 – Jimmy Robertson
- 106, 100 – Barry Hawkins
- 102 – Fan Zhengyi
- 101, 100 – Xiao Guodong
- 101 – Craig Steadman
- 100 – Ben Woollaston

=== Qualifying stage centuries ===
During the qualification round, 15 century breaks were made. The highest was a 138 made by Maguire.

- 138 – Stephen Maguire
- 136 – Stuart Carrington
- 134 – Si Jiahui
- 134 – Hossein Vafaei
- 132 – Jimmy White
- 125, 104 – David Gilbert
- 118 – Robert Milkins
- 115 – Dean Young
- 112 – Jak Jones
- 110 – Ryan Day
- 107 – Jackson Page
- 102 – Craig Steadman
- 102 – Ben Woollaston
- 101 – Louis Heathcote
