= EBSA European Under-18 Snooker Championship =

The EBSA European Under-18 Snooker Championships is an amateur junior snooker tournament. The event series is sanctioned by the European Billiards and Snooker Association and started from 2016.

The inaugural tournament was won by Tyler Rees who defeated fellow countryman Jackson Page 5–2 in the final. The winner of the tournament is awarded with a place in the qualifying rounds of the World Snooker Championship. The 2017 tournament was won by the 2016 runner-up and 2016 World Under-18 Snooker Champion Page who defeated the number 8 seed Amir Nardeia 5–3 in the final.

== Winners ==
=== Men's ===
Year	Venue	Winner	Runner-up	Score	Ref
2016	Wrocław, Poland	(Wales) Tyler Rees	(Wales) Jackson Page	5–2	
2017	Nicosia, Cyprus	(Wales) Jackson Page	(Israel) Amir Nardeia	5–3	
2018	Sofia, Bulgaria	(Wales) Jackson Page	(Austria) Florian Nüßle	5–3	
2019	Eilat, Israel	(Republic of Ireland) Aaron Hill	(Wales) Dylan Emery	4–3	
2020	Albufeira, Portugal	(Republic of Ireland) Aaron Hill	(England) Sean Maddocks	4–1	
2021	Albufeira, Portugal	(Belgium) Ben Mertens	(Belgium) Julien Leclercq	4–3	
2022	Shengjin, Albania	(Wales) Liam Davies	(Republic of Ireland) Leone Crowley	4–1	
2023	St. Paul's Bay, Malta	(Hungary) Bulcsú Révész	(England) Liam Pullen	4–3	
2024	Sarajevo, Bosnia Herzegovina	(Hungary) Bulcsú Révész	(Moldova) Vladislav Gradinari	4–0	
2025	Antalya, Turkey	(Poland) Michał Szubarczyk	(England) Ethan Llewellyn	4–1	
2026	Gandia, Spain	(Poland) Michał Szubarczyk	(Moldova) Vladislav Gradinari	4–0	

== Statistics ==
=== Champions by country ===
Country	Titles	Players	First title	Last title	By player (Titles)
Wales	4	3	2016	2022	Jackson Page (2)
Wales	4	3	2016	2022	Tyler Rees (1)
Wales	4	3	2016	2022	Liam Davies (1)
Ireland	2	1	2019	2020	Aaron Hill (2)
Hungary	2	1	2023	2024	Bulcsú Révész (2)
Belgium	1	1	2021	2021	Ben Mertens (1)

== See also ==
- EBSA European Snooker Championship
- EBSA European Under-21 Snooker Championships
- IBSF World Under-18 Snooker Championship
- World Snooker Tour
