= 2016 IBSF World Under-18 Snooker Championship =

IBSF World Under-18 Snooker Championship
Tournament information
- Dates: 16–20 August 2016
- City: Mol
- Country: Belgium
- Organisation: IBSF
- Highest break: (Wales) Jackson Page (129)

Final
- Champion: (Wales) Jackson Page
- Runner-up: (Hong Kong) Yun Fung Tam
- Score: 5–4

The 2016 IBSF World Under-18 Snooker Championship was an amateur snooker tournament that took place from 16 August to 20 August 2016 in Mol, Belgium It was the 2nd edition of the IBSF World Under-18 Snooker Championship.

The tournament was won by number 30 seed Jackson Page who defeated the number 1 seed Yun Fung Tam 5–4 in a final frame decider.

== Results ==
=== Round 1 ===
Best of 7 frames

33	(Republic of Ireland) Noel Landers	0–4	32	(Romania) Tudor Popescu
17	(Poland) Karol Lelek	4–0	48	(Romania) Matei Rosca
49	(Poland) Felix Vidler	4–2	16	(Japan) Keishin Kamihashi
41	(Belgium) Brent Geentjens	0–4	24	(Poland) Daniel Holoyda
25	(Russia) Mikhail Terekhov	2–4	40	(England) Adam Morrey
37	(Austria) Florian Nüßle	4–1	28	(Republic of Ireland) Shane Hourihane
21	(Scotland) Chris Totten	4–3	44	(Republic of Ireland) Sean Devenney
53	(Republic of Ireland) Eamon Harkin	0–4	12	(Israel) Amir Nardeia
13	(England) Chae Ross	0–4	52	(Thailand) Narongdat Takantong
45	(Belgium) Sybren Sokolowski	0–4	20	(Albania) Eklent Kaçi
29	(India) Digvijay Kadian	4–2	36	(Kyrgyzstan) Mukhamed Karimberdi Uulu

35	(Republic of Ireland) Ross Bulman	2–4	30	(Wales) Jackson Page
19	(India) Sparsh Pherwani	4–2	46	(Romania) Maxim Ene
51	(Hong Kong) Ming Tung Chan	4–2	14	(England) Callum Costello
11	(Wales) Dylan Emery	4–0	54	(Wales) Lewis Sinclair
43	(Russia) Ivan Kakovsky	3–4	22	(Finland) Patrik Tiihonen
27	(Republic of Ireland) Darragh Cusack	1–4	38	(Czech Republic) Ales Herout
39	(Scotland) Dean Young	1–4	26	(New Zealand) Louis Chand
23	(England) Riley Parsons	4–2	42	(England) Jack Harris
15	(Belgium) Amedeo Durnez	1–4	50	(England) Connor Rollo
47	(Poland) Michał Kotiuk	4–3	18	(Republic of Ireland) Fergal Quinn
31	(India) Mehul Saini	3–4	34	(Poland) Mihai Vladu

Round 2 Best of 7 frames
1	(Hong Kong) Y.F. Tam	4
32	(Romania) T. Popescu	0
17	(Poland) K. Lelek	4
49	(Poland) F. Vidler	1
9	(Thailand) P. Kimsuk	4
24	(Poland) D. Holoyda	0
40	(England) A. Morrey	0
8	(Republic of Ireland) C. Sweeney	4
5	(Hong Kong) K.W. Cheung	4
37	(Austria) F. Nüßle	3
21	(Scotland) C. Totten	4
12	(Israel) A. Nardeia	2
52	(Thailand) N. Takantong	2
20	(Albania) E. Kaçi	4
29	(India) D. Kadian	1
4	(England) L. Gillen	4
3	(England) M. Lloyd	2
30	(Wales) J. Page	4
19	(India) S. Pherwani	0
51	(Hong Kong) M.T. Chan	4
11	(Wales) D. Emery	4
22	(Finland) P. Tiihonen	1
38	(Czech Republic) A. Herout	1
6	(India) S. Suryanarayanan	4
7	(Hong Kong) Y.K. Chang	0
26	(New Zealand) L. Chand	4
23	(England) R. Parsons	1
10	(Wales) T. Rees	4
50	(England) C. Rollo	4
47	(Poland) M. Kotiuk	0
34	(Romania) M. Vladu	4
2	(France) N. Vincent	2

Round 3 Best of 7 frames
1	(Hong Kong) Y.F. Tam	4
17	(Poland) K. Lelek	0
9	(Thailand) P. Kimsuk	0
8	(Republic of Ireland) C. Sweeney	4
5	(Hong Kong) K.W. Cheung	3
21	(Scotland) C. Totten	4
20	(Albania) E. Kaçi	3
4	(England) L. Gillen	4
30	(Wales) J. Page	4
51	(Hong Kong) M.T. Chan	0
11	(Wales) D. Emery	1
6	(India) S. Suryanarayanan	4
26	(New Zealand) L. Chand	2
10	(Wales) T. Rees	4
50	(England) C. Rollo	1
34	(Romania) M. Vladu	4

Quarter-Finals; Best of 7 frames
1	(Hong Kong) Y.F. Tam	4
8	(Republic of Ireland) C. Sweeney	2
21	(Scotland) C. Totten	4
4	(England) L. Gillen	0
30	(Wales) J. Page	4
6	(India) S. Suryanarayanan	3
10	(Wales) T. Rees	2
34	(Romania) M. Vladu	4

Semi-Finals; Best of 7 frames
1	(Hong Kong) Y.F. Tam	4
21	(Scotland) C. Totten	2
30	(Wales) J. Page	4
34	(Romania) M. Vladu	1

Final; Best of 9 frames
1	(Hong Kong) Y.F. Tam	4
30	(Wales) J. Page	5
