= Jackson Page =

Welsh snooker player (born 2001)

Personal information
- Nickname: Action
- Born: 8 August 2001 (age 25) Ebbw Vale, Blaenau Gwent

Sport
- Country: Wales
- Sport: Snooker
- Professional: 2019–present
- Highest ranking: 32 (March 2026)
- Current ranking: 38 (as of 7 November 2026)
- Maximum breaks: 2
- Best ranking finish: Runner-up (2024 Championship League)

Jackson Page (born 8 August 2001) is a Welsh professional snooker player from Ebbw Vale, Blaenau Gwent. As an amateur, he was European U-21 champion, Under-18 World Snooker Champion, and Under-18 European Snooker Champion. He turned professional in the 2019–20 snooker season and made his Crucible debut at the 2022 World Snooker Championship, losing 3–13 in the last 16 to his mentor and practice partner Mark Williams. He reached his first ranking final at the 2024 Championship League but lost 1–3 to Ali Carter. While playing Allan Taylor in the 2025 World Championship qualifiers, he became the first player to make two maximum breaks in the same match.

== Career ==
In February 2016, Page entered the 2016 EBSA European Under-18 Snooker Championship as the number 13 seed and advanced to the final where he was defeated 2–5 by fellow countryman Tyler Rees. Later that year, Page competed in the 2016 IBSF World Under-18 Snooker Championship where he again advanced to the final and defeated the number 1 seed Yun Fung Tam 5–4.

At the age of 15, Page was awarded a wildcard to the 2017 Welsh Open. In the first round, he beat Jason Weston 4–3 on a re-spotted black. In the second round, he defeated John Astley by the same scoreline to reach the round of 32, before losing 0–4 to Judd Trump. In the qualifiers for the 2017 World Championship he was edged out 9–10 on the final pink by Martin O'Donnell in the first round.

Page turned professional in 2019 after winning the EBSA European Under-21 Snooker Championships in Israel. His best results from his first two seasons on the tour were reaching the last 16 of the September 2020 European Masters, where he was whitewashed 0–5 by Trump, and the last 32 of the 2020 Scottish Open, where he lost 1–4 to his mentor and practice partner Mark Williams. He was relegated from the main professional tour after losing 5–6 to Kacper Filipiak in the 2021 World Championship qualifiers. However, he quickly regained his professional standing, defeating Michael Georgiou at the 2021 Q School to win another two-year tour card. He reached the last 16 of the 2021 Northern Ireland Open, but lost 3–4 to Ricky Walden despite having led 3–2.

In the 2022 World Snooker Championship qualifying rounds, Page won four matches, defeating opponents including Joe Perry and David Grace, to reach the main stage of the tournament. He made his Crucible debut against former world finalist Barry Hawkins and won his first-round match 10–7, making back-to-back total clearances of 128 and 135 in the final two frames. In the second round, Page again faced Williams, but lost the first seven frames and went on to a 3–13 defeat, losing the match with a session to spare. Williams made six centuries in the match.

In April 2025, Page became the first player to make two maximum breaks in the same match, during his win over Allan Taylor in the qualifiers for the 2025 World Championship. He won a £147,000 bonus on offer that season for making two maximums across the Triple Crown events and the Saudi Arabia Snooker Masters.

== Performance and rankings timeline ==
Tournament	2016/ 17	2017/ 18	2018/ 19	2019/ 20	2020/ 21	2021/ 22	2022/ 23	2023/ 24	2024/ 25	2025/ 26	2026/ 27
Ranking (Note: It shows the ranking at the beginning of the season.)	(Note: He was an amateur)			(Note: New players on the Main Tour don't have a ranking)	72	(Note: Players qualified through Q School started the season without ranking points)	66	46	45	36	35
Ranking tournaments
Championship League	Non-Ranking Event				RR	RR	RR	RR	F	RR	2R
China Open	A	A	A	Tournament Not Held							1R
Wuhan Open	Tournament Not Held							1R	2R	2R	1R
British Open	Tournament Not Held					1R	LQ	LQ	LQ	1R	2R
English Open	A	A	A	1R	1R	LQ	LQ	1R	1R	QF	1R
Shenzhen Open (Note: The event was called the Xi'an Grand Prix (2024/2025–2025/2026))	Tournament Not Held								LQ	1R	1R
Northern Ireland Open	A	1R	A	2R	2R	3R	1R	1R	LQ	2R	LQ
International Championship	A	LQ	A	LQ	Not Held			1R	QF	LQ	1R
UK Championship	A	1R	A	1R	1R	1R	LQ	LQ	1R	LQ	
Shoot Out	A	A	A	1R	1R	2R	2R	2R	2R	QF	
Scottish Open	A	1R	A	1R	3R	2R	LQ	1R	2R	1R	
German Masters	A	LQ	A	LQ	LQ	LQ	LQ	LQ	1R	LQ	LQ
Welsh Open	3R	2R	1R	1R	1R	LQ	1R	LQ	QF	3R	
World Grand Prix	DNQ	DNQ	DNQ	DNQ	DNQ	DNQ	DNQ	DNQ	1R	DNQ	
Players Championship	DNQ	DNQ	DNQ	DNQ	DNQ	DNQ	DNQ	DNQ	DNQ	DNQ	
World Open	A	LQ	A	1R	Not Held			SF	1R	2R	
Tour Championship	Not Held		DNQ	DNQ	DNQ	DNQ	DNQ	DNQ	DNQ	DNQ	
World Championship	LQ	LQ	LQ	LQ	LQ	2R	LQ	1R	LQ	LQ	
Non-ranking tournaments
Championship League	A	A	A	RR	A	A	A	A	RR	RR	
Former ranking tournaments
Indian Open	A	1R	A	Tournament Not Held							
Paul Hunter Classic	A	LQ	4R	NR	Tournament Not Held						
Riga Masters	A	1R	A	1R	Tournament Not Held						
China Championship	NR	A	A	LQ	Tournament Not Held						
WST Pro Series	Tournament Not Held				RR	Tournament Not Held					
Turkish Masters	Tournament Not Held					2R	Tournament Not Held				
Gibraltar Open	A	1R	LQ	2R	1R	2R	Tournament Not Held				
WST Classic	Tournament Not Held						4R	Tournament Not Held			
European Masters	A	LQ	A	2R	4R	1R	2R	1R	Not Held		
Saudi Arabia Masters	Tournament Not Held								3R	3R	NH
Former non-ranking tournaments
Six-red World Championship	A	A	A	A	Not Held		LQ	Tournament Not Held			
Haining Open	A	A	A	3R	NH	A	A	Tournament Not Held			

Performance Table Legend
LQ	lost in the qualifying draw	#R	lost in the early rounds of the tournament (WR = Wildcard round, RR = Round robin)	QF	lost in the quarter-finals
SF	lost in the semi-finals	F	lost in the final	W	won the tournament
DNQ	did not qualify for the tournament	A	did not participate in the tournament	WD	withdrew from the tournament

NH / Not Held	means an event was not held.
NR / Non-Ranking Event	means an event is/was no longer a ranking event.
R / Ranking Event	means an event is/was a ranking event.
MR / Minor-Ranking Event	means an event is/was a minor-ranking event.

== Career finals ==
=== Ranking finals: 1 ===
Outcome	No.	Year	Championship	Opponent in the final	Score
Runner-up	1.	2024	Championship League	(England) Ali Carter	1–3

=== Amateur finals: 8 (5 titles) ===
Outcome	No.	Year	Championship	Opponent in the final	Score
Runner-up	1.	2016	European Under-18 Championship	(Wales) Tyler Rees	2–5
Winner	1.	2016	World Under-18 Championship	(Hong Kong) Yun Fung Tam	5–4
Winner	2.	2017	European Under-18 Championship	(Israel) Amir Nardeia	5–3
Runner-up	2.	2017	European Under-21 Championship	(Switzerland) Alexander Ursenbacher	4–6
Winner	3.	2018	European Under-18 Championship (2)	(Austria) Florian Nüßle	5–3
Winner	4.	2018	Welsh Amateur Championship	(Wales) Ian Sargeant	8–1
Runner-up	3.	2018	Challenge Tour – Event 3	(England) Barry Pinches	2–3
Winner	5.	2019	European Under-21 Championship	(Republic of Ireland) Ross Bulman	5–1
