= Louis Heathcote =

English snooker player

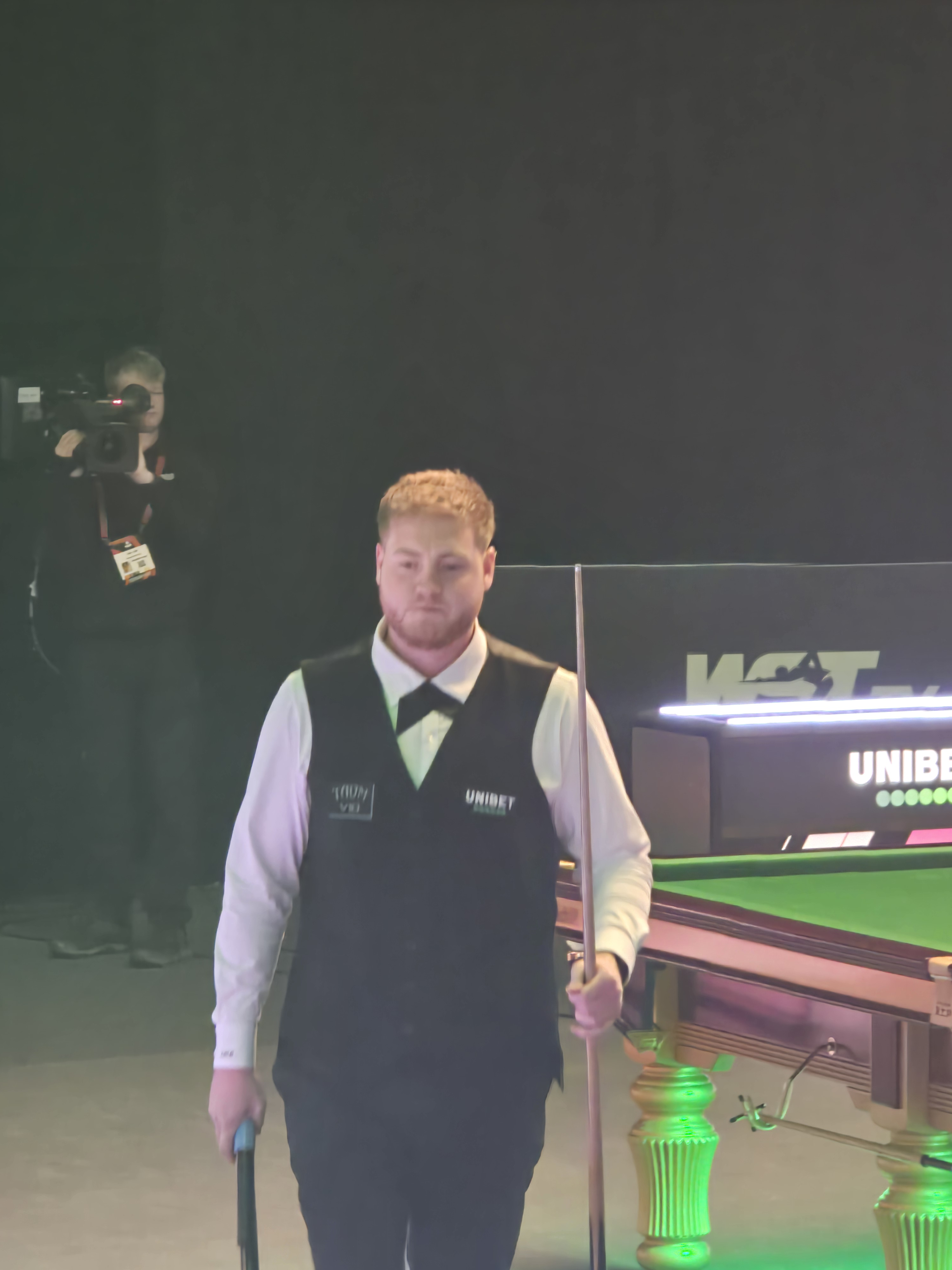
- Heathcote at the 2025 British Open

Personal information
- Born: 3 July 1997 (age 29) Leicester, England

Sport
- Country: England
- Sport: Snooker
- Professional: 2019–present
- Highest ranking: 66 (May 2021)
- Current ranking: 68 (as of 7 November 2026)
- Best ranking finish: Quarter-final (x3)

Louis Heathcote (born 3 July 1997) is an English professional snooker player.

== Career ==
In May 2019, Heathcote came through Q-School - Event 2 by winning six matches to earn a two-year card on the World Snooker Tour for the 2019–20 and 2020–21 seasons.

== Performance and rankings timeline ==
Tournament	2016/ 17	2017/ 18	2019/ 20	2020/ 21	2021/ 22	2022/ 23	2023/ 24	2024/ 25	2025/ 26	2026/ 27
Ranking (Note: It shows the ranking at the beginning of the season)	(Note: He was an amateur)		(Note: New players don't have a ranking)	67	(Note: Players qualified One Year Ranking List started the season without ranking points)	78	(Note: Players qualified through the Q School started the season without ranking points)	71		67
Ranking tournaments
Championship League	Non-Ranking Event			RR	RR	RR	RR	RR	RR	RR
China Open	A	A	Tournament Not Held							LQ
Wuhan Open	Tournament Not Held						LQ	1R	1R	LQ
British Open	Tournament Not Held				2R	LQ	LQ	LQ	QF	LQ
English Open	A	A	3R	1R	LQ	1R	1R	LQ	1R	1R
Shenzhen Open (Note: The event was called the Xi'an Grand Prix (2024/2025–2025/2026))	Tournament Not Held							LQ	2R	LQ
Northern Ireland Open	A	A	1R	2R	2R	1R	LQ	QF	1R	2R
International Championship	LQ	A	1R	Not Held			LQ	LQ	1R	1R
UK Championship	A	A	2R	1R	1R	LQ	LQ	LQ	LQ	LQ
Shoot Out	1R	A	1R	QF	1R	2R	2R	2R	1R	
Scottish Open	A	A	2R	2R	LQ	LQ	LQ	LQ	LQ	LQ
German Masters	A	A	LQ	1R	LQ	2R	1R	LQ	LQ	
Welsh Open	A	A	2R	1R	LQ	1R	LQ	LQ	1R	
World Grand Prix	DNQ	DNQ	DNQ	DNQ	DNQ	DNQ	DNQ	DNQ	DNQ	
Players Championship	DNQ	DNQ	DNQ	DNQ	DNQ	DNQ	DNQ	DNQ	DNQ	
World Open	A	A	LQ	Not Held			1R	2R	LQ	
Tour Championship	Not Held		DNQ	DNQ	DNQ	DNQ	DNQ	DNQ	DNQ	
World Championship	A	A	LQ	LQ	LQ	LQ	LQ	LQ	LQ	
Non-ranking tournaments
Championship League	A	A	RR	A	A	A	A	A	A	
Former ranking tournaments
Indian Open	LQ	A	Tournament Not Held							
Paul Hunter Classic	LQ	1R	NR	Tournament Not Held						
Riga Masters	LQ	A	WD	Tournament Not Held						
China Championship	NR	A	LQ	Tournament Not Held						
WST Pro Series	Not Held			2R	Tournament Not Held					
Turkish Masters	Tournament Not Held				LQ	Tournament Not Held				
Gibraltar Open	LQ	1R	2R	1R	3R	Tournament Not Held				
WST Classic	Tournament Not Held					1R	Tournament Not Held			
European Masters	LQ	A	LQ	1R	1R	LQ	1R	Not Held		
Saudi Arabia Masters	Tournament Not Held							3R	4R	NH
Former non-ranking tournaments
Six-red World Championship	A	A	A	Not Held		LQ	Tournament Not Held			

Performance Table Legend
LQ	lost in the qualifying draw	#R	lost in the early rounds of the tournament (WR = Wildcard round, RR = Round robin)	QF	lost in the quarter-finals
SF	lost in the semi-finals	F	lost in the final	W	won the tournament
DNQ	did not qualify for the tournament	A	did not participate in the tournament	WD	withdrew from the tournament

NH / Not Held	means an event was not held.
NR / Non-Ranking Event	means an event is/was no longer a ranking event.
R / Ranking Event	means an event is/was a ranking event.
MR / Minor-Ranking Event	means an event is/was a minor-ranking event.

== Career finals ==
=== Amateur finals: 1 ===
Outcome	No.	Year	Championship	Opponent in the final	Score
Runner-up	1.	2015	European Under-21 Snooker Championship	(Isle of Man) Darryl Hill	3–6
