= 2021 Northern Ireland Open =

Snooker tournament

2021 BetVictor Northern Ireland Open
Tournament information
- Dates: 9–17 October 2021
- Venue: Waterfront Hall
- City: Belfast
- Country: Northern Ireland
- Organisation: World Snooker Tour
- Format: Ranking event
- Total prize fund: £405,000
- Winner's share: £70,000
- Highest break: Mark Allen (NIR) (147)

Final
- Champion: Mark Allen (NIR)
- Runner-up: John Higgins (SCO)
- Score: 9–8

The 2021 Northern Ireland Open (officially the 2021 BetVictor Northern Ireland Open) was a professional ranking snooker tournament that took place from 9 to 17 October 2021 at the Waterfront Hall in Belfast, Northern Ireland. It was the third ranking event of the 2021–22 season and the first tournament in both the Home Nations Series and the European Series. It was the sixth edition of the Northern Ireland Open.

Qualifying for the tournament took place from 23 to 27 August 2021 at the Morningside Arena in Leicester, England, although matches involving the top 16 players, and three other matches featuring Northern Irish players, were held over and played at the Waterfront Hall. All of the top 16 players participated except for world number 9 Ding Junhui. Mark Allen made a maximum break in his held over qualifying match against Si Jiahui.

The defending champion was Judd Trump, who defeated Ronnie O'Sullivan in the 2018, 2019 and 2020 finals by a scoreline of 9–7 each time. Trump lost 3–5 in the quarter-finals to Allen, having led 3–0.

Allen faced John Higgins in the final, which was tied at 4–4 after the afternoon session. Higgins moved 8–6 ahead in the evening session, but Allen won the last three frames for a 9–8 victory. It was Allen's first Northern Ireland Open title, his second Home Nations win, and the sixth ranking title of his professional career.

== Format ==
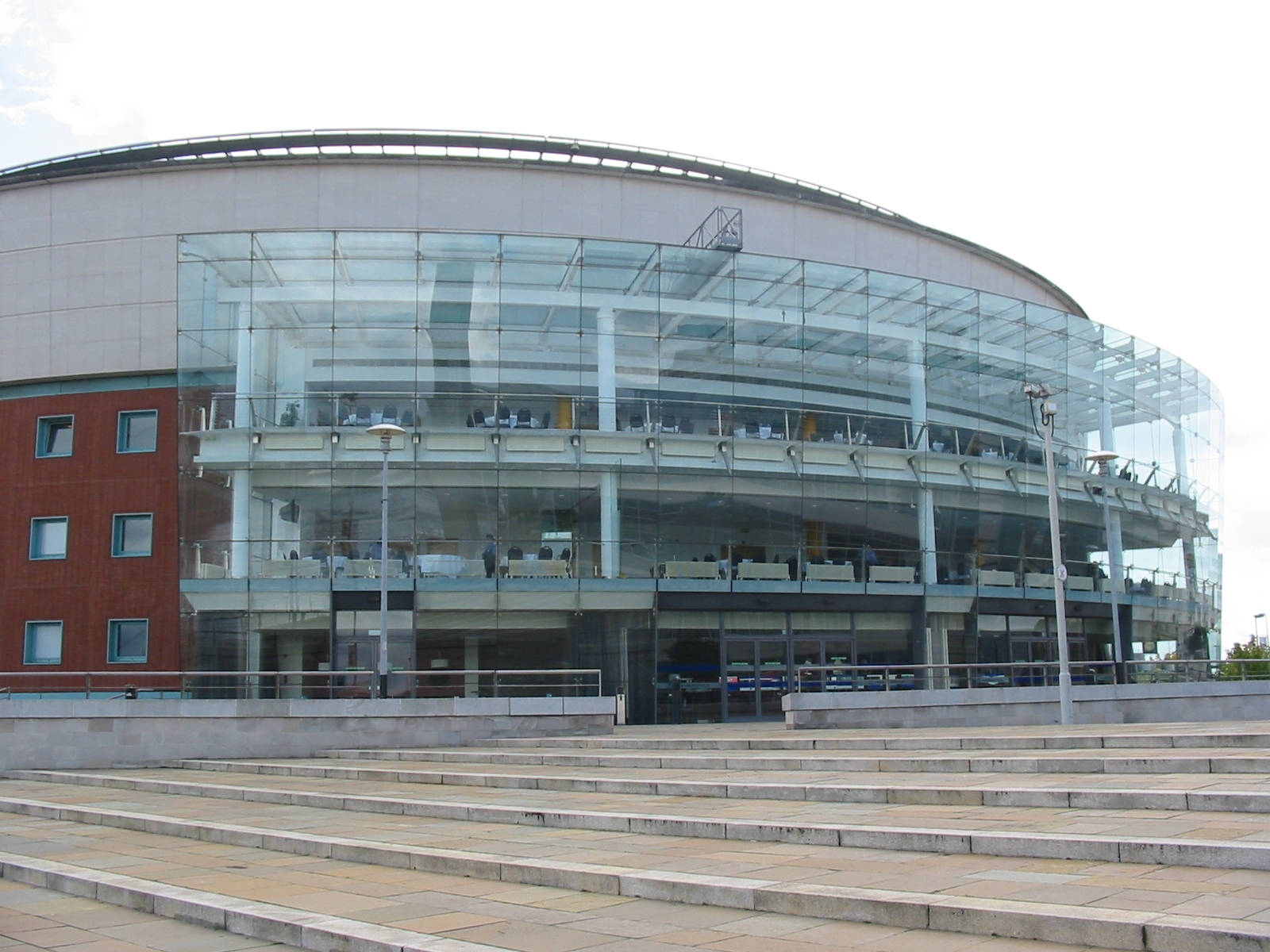
The event took place at the Waterfront Hall in Belfast.

The Northern Ireland Open was first played in 2016, and was won by Mark King. The 2021 event was the first of four Home Nations Series events, and the third world ranking tournament of the 2019–20 snooker season. The event took place from 9 to 17 October 2021 at the Waterfront Hall in Belfast, Northern Ireland. The event followed the British Open, and preceded the English Open.

The defending champion was Judd Trump, who defeated Ronnie O'Sullivan in the 2018, 2019 and 2020 finals by a scoreline of 9–7 each time. All matches were played as the best of 7 frames in the first four rounds, at which point the number increased: 9 in the quarter-finals; 11 in the semi-finals; and the best of 19 frames in the final. Sports betting company BetVictor sponsored the event, which was broadcast in Europe by Eurosport; CCTV, Rigour, Liaoning TV in China; NowTV in Hong Kong; Astro SuperSports in Malaysia and Brunei; True Vision in Thailand; Sky Sports in New Zealand and Matchroom Sport in all other territories.

=== Prize fund ===
The breakdown of prize money for this event is shown below:

- Winner: £70,000
- Runner-up: £30,000
- Semi-final: £20,000
- Quarter-final: £10,000
- Last 16: £7,500
- Last 32: £4,000
- Last 64: £3,000
- Highest break: £5,000
- Total: £405,000

== Main draw ==
The results from the event are shown below. Seeded players have their seedings in brackets. Players highlighted in bold denote match winners.

=== Top half ===
**Last 64**; Best of 7 frames
**Judd Trump (ENG) (1)**	**4**
Gao Yang (CHN)	0
**Lu Ning (CHN)**	**w/o**
Jamie O'Neill (ENG)	w/d
**Jimmy Robertson (ENG)**	**4**
Sunny Akani (THA)	3
**James Cahill (ENG)**	**4**
Fergal O'Brien (IRL)	0
Simon Lichtenberg (GER)	3
**Matthew Stevens (WAL)**	**4**
Peter Devlin (ENG)	2
**Mark Allen (NIR) (9)**	**4**
**Liam Highfield (ENG)**	**4**
Ryan Day (WAL) (25)	1
Hammad Miah (ENG)	3
**Stephen Maguire (SCO) (8)**	**4**
**Shaun Murphy (ENG) (5)**	**4**
Allan Taylor (ENG)	3
Chris Wakelin (ENG)	2
**Tian Pengfei (CHN)**	**4**
**Stuart Bingham (ENG) (12)**	**4**
Sam Craigie (ENG)	2
Tom Ford (ENG) (21)	w/d
**Ashley Carty (ENG)**	**w/o**
**Jackson Page (WAL)**	**4**
Noppon Saengkham (THA)	3
Fan Zhengyi (CHN)	2
**Jack Lisowski (ENG) (13)**	**4**
Martin O'Donnell (ENG)	3
**Ricky Walden (ENG) (29)**	**4**
Xu Si (CHN)	0
**Neil Robertson (AUS) (4)**	**4**

**Last 32**; Best of 7 frames
**(England) Judd Trump (1)**	**4**
(China) Lu Ning	2
**(England) Jimmy Robertson**	**4**
(England) James Cahill	0
(Wales) Matthew Stevens	1
**(Northern Ireland) Mark Allen (9)**	**4**
(England) Liam Highfield	2
**(Scotland) Stephen Maguire (8)**	**4**
**(England) Shaun Murphy (5)**	**4**
(China) Tian Pengfei	3
**(England) Stuart Bingham (12)**	**4**
(England) Ashley Carty	3
**(Wales) Jackson Page**	**4**
(England) Jack Lisowski (13)	0
**(England) Ricky Walden (29)**	**4**
(Australia) Neil Robertson (4)	1

**Last 16**; Best of 7 frames
**(England) Judd Trump (1)**	**4**
(England) Jimmy Robertson	3
**(Northern Ireland) Mark Allen (9)**	**4**
(Scotland) Stephen Maguire (8)	3
**(England) Shaun Murphy (5)**	**4**
(England) Stuart Bingham (12)	1
(Wales) Jackson Page	3
**(England) Ricky Walden (29)**	**4**

**Quarter-finals**; Best of 9 frames
(England) Judd Trump (1)	3
**(Northern Ireland) Mark Allen (9)**	**5**
(England) Shaun Murphy (5)	4
**(England) Ricky Walden (29)**	**5**

**Semi-finals**; Best of 11 frames
**(Northern Ireland) Mark Allen (9)**	**6**
(England) Ricky Walden (29)	3

=== Bottom half ===
**Last 64**; Best of 7 frames
**Ronnie O'Sullivan (ENG) (3)**	**4**
Andy Hicks (ENG)	1
Yuan Sijun (CHN)	2
**Alfie Burden (ENG)**	**4**
**Yan Bingtao (CHN) (14)**	**4**
Duane Jones (WAL)	3
**Oliver Lines (ENG)**	**4**
Ben Woollaston (ENG)	0
**Lyu Haotian (CHN)**	**4**
Ali Carter (ENG) (22)	2
**Mark King (ENG)**	**4**
Barry Hawkins (ENG) (11)	0
**Mitchell Mann (ENG)**	**4**
Xiao Guodong (CHN) (27)	2
Robert Milkins (ENG)	1
**Kyren Wilson (ENG) (6)**	**4**
**John Higgins (SCO) (7)**	**4**
Farakh Ajaib (PAK)	2
Liang Wenbo (CHN) (26)	2
**Luca Brecel (BEL)**	**4**
**Mark Williams (WAL) (10)**	**4**
Elliot Slessor (ENG)	3
Martin Gould (ENG) (23)	2
**Jak Jones (WAL)**	**4**
David Grace (ENG)	0
**David Gilbert (ENG) (18)**	**4**
**Louis Heathcote (ENG)**	**4**
Lee Walker (WAL)	3
Rory McLeod (JAM)	0
**Gary Wilson (ENG) (31)**	**4**
Cao Yupeng (CHN)	3
**Mark Selby (ENG) (2)**	**4**

**Last 32**; Best of 7 frames
**(England) Ronnie O'Sullivan (3)**	**4**
(England) Alfie Burden	1
**(China) Yan Bingtao (14)**	**4**
(England) Oliver Lines	0
**(China) Lyu Haotian**	**4**
(England) Mark King	1
**(England) Mitchell Mann**	**4**
(England) Kyren Wilson (6)	2
**(Scotland) John Higgins (7)**	**4**
(Belgium) Luca Brecel	2
**(Wales) Mark Williams (10)**	**4**
(Wales) Jak Jones	2
**(England) David Gilbert (18)**	**4**
(England) Louis Heathcote	2
(England) Gary Wilson (31)	1
**(England) Mark Selby (2)**	**4**

**Last 16**; Best of 7 frames
(England) Ronnie O'Sullivan (3)	3
**(China) Yan Bingtao (14)**	**4**
(China) Lyu Haotian	1
**(England) Mitchell Mann**	**4**
**(Scotland) John Higgins (7)**	**4**
(Wales) Mark Williams (10)	3
**(England) David Gilbert (18)**	**4**
(England) Mark Selby (2)	2

**Quarter-finals**; Best of 9 frames
**(China) Yan Bingtao (14)**	**5**
(England) Mitchell Mann	0
**(Scotland) John Higgins (7)**	**5**
(England) David Gilbert (18)	3

**Semi-finals**; Best of 11 frames
(China) Yan Bingtao (14)	2
**(Scotland) John Higgins (7)**	**6**

=== Final ===
Final: Best of 17 frames. Referee: Olivier Marteel; Waterfront Hall, Belfast, Northern Ireland, 17 October 2021.
**Mark Allen** (9); Northern Ireland	**9**–8	John Higgins (7); Scotland
Afternoon: **78**–21, **82**–1, 0–**123** (123), **70**–6, 11–**68**, **70**–47, 0–**78**, 63–**64**; Evening: **76**–47, 40–**89**, **86**–0, 40–**89**, 1–**64**, 6–**144** (136), **51**–6, **80**–43, **65**–31
85	Highest break	**136**
0	Century breaks	**2**

== Qualifying ==
Qualification for the tournament took place from 23 to 27 August 2021 at the Morningside Arena in Leicester, England. Matches involving the top 16 players — including the defending champion — alongside three other matches involving local players, were held over and played at the Waterfront Hall. Graeme Dott, Anthony Hamilton, Mark Davis and Robbie McGuigan were due to take part in the event, but withdrew and were replaced by James Cahill, Dylan Emery, Mark Lloyd and Robert McCullough respectively.

An incident took place in the players lounge after the Peter Lines v Xiao Guodong match. Lines confronted Xiao in the players' lounge after the match, accused him of cheating. Lines also swore at Xiao, and challenged him to a fight, leading to security personnel removing Lines from the lounge. The incident was in relation to perceived inaccuracies in ball placement by the referee after a foul and a miss was called during a frame of their match. The incident was reported to the WPBSA and Lines was found guilty at a subsequent hearing after the tournament of; breaching the code of conduct for members of the WPBSA, bringing the WPBSA into disrepute, bringing the game of snooker into disrepute, and for engaging in conduct likely to cause an opponent to be unduly influenced so as to affect the outcome of a match or event. Lines was ordered to pay a fine and costs. Lines subsequently apologised for his conduct to Xiao.

- Judd Trump (ENG) (1) 4–1 Andrew Pagett (WAL) (Note: Match held over and played in Belfast.)
- Christopher Clifford (NIR) 0–4 Gao Yang (CHN)
- Scott Donaldson (SCO) 3–4 Lu Ning (CHN)
- Michael Judge (IRL) 2–4 Jamie O'Neill (ENG)
- Zhou Yuelong (CHN) 2–4 Jimmy Robertson (ENG)
- Gerard Greene (NIR) 2–4 Sunny Akani (THA)
- James Cahill (ENG) 4–2 Chang Bingyu (CHN)
- Zhang Anda (CHN) 2–4 Fergal O'Brien (IRL)
- Wu Yize (CHN) 2–4 Simon Lichtenberg (GER)
- Zhao Xintong (CHN) 3–4 Matthew Stevens (WAL)
- Alexander Ursenbacher (SUI) 2–4 Peter Devlin (ENG)
- Mark Allen (NIR) (9) 4–1 Si Jiahui (CHN)
- Liam Highfield (ENG) 4–1 Reanne Evans (ENG)
- Ryan Day (WAL) 4–1 Igor Figueiredo (BRA)
- Dean Young (SCO) 1–4 Hammad Miah (ENG)
- Stephen Maguire (SCO) (8) 4–2 Steven Hallworth (ENG)
- Shaun Murphy (ENG) (5) 4–2 Bai Langning (CHN)
- John Astley (ENG) 2–4 Allan Taylor (ENG)
- Michael Holt (ENG) 3–4 Chris Wakelin (ENG)
- Sean Maddocks (ENG) 3–4 Tian Pengfei (CHN)
- Stuart Bingham (ENG) 4–1 Ben Hancorn (ENG)
- Robert McCullough (NIR) 1–4 Sam Craigie (ENG)
- Tom Ford (ENG) 4–3 Zak Surety (ENG)
- Ashley Carty (ENG) 4–2 Jamie Jones (WAL)
- Lei Peifan (CHN) 3–4 Jackson Page (WAL)
- Thepchaiya Un-Nooh (THA) 3–4 Noppon Saengkham (THA)
- Fan Zhengyi (CHN) 4–2 David Lilley (ENG)
- Jack Lisowski (ENG) 4–3 Ashley Hugill (ENG)
- Martin O'Donnell (ENG) 4–2 Jamie Wilson (ENG)
- Ricky Walden (ENG) 4–1 Fraser Patrick (SCO)
- Michael Georgiou (CYP) 2–4 Xu Si (CHN)
- Neil Robertson (AUS) (4) 4–0 Barry Pinches (ENG)
- Ronnie O'Sullivan (ENG) (3) 4–0 Stuart Carrington (ENG)
- Aaron Hill (IRL) 2–4 Andy Hicks (ENG)
- Matthew Selt (ENG) 1–4 Yuan Sijun (CHN)
- Alfie Burden (ENG) 4–1 Chen Zifan (CHN)
- Yan Bingtao (CHN) 4–0 Hossein Vafaei (IRN)
- Zhang Jiankang (CHN) 3–4 Duane Jones (WAL)
- Joe Perry (ENG) 2–4 Oliver Lines (ENG)
- Lukas Kleckers (GER) 0–4 Ben Woollaston (ENG)
- Lyu Haotian (CHN) 4–2 Zhao Jianbo (CHN)
- Ali Carter (ENG) 4–1 Dylan Emery (WAL)
- Li Hang (CHN) 2–4 Mark King (ENG)
- Barry Hawkins (ENG) 4–1 Iulian Boiko (UKR)
- Sanderson Lam (ENG) 1–4 Mitchell Mann (ENG)
- Xiao Guodong (CHN) 4–3 Peter Lines (ENG)
- Robert Milkins (ENG) 4–0 Nigel Bond (ENG)
- Kyren Wilson (ENG) (6) 4–0 Jamie Clarke (WAL)
- John Higgins (SCO) (7) 4–2 Joe O'Connor (ENG)
- Andrew Higginson (ENG) 3–4 Farakh Ajaib (PAK)
- Liang Wenbo (CHN) 4–1 Pang Junxu (CHN)
- Luca Brecel (BEL) 4–0 Michael White (WAL)
- Mark Williams (WAL) 4–1 Mark Joyce (ENG)
- Ross Muir (SCO) 3–4 Elliot Slessor (ENG)
- Martin Gould (ENG) 4–2 Ken Doherty (IRL)
- Soheil Vahedi (IRN) 2–4 Jak Jones (WAL)
- Jimmy White (ENG) 0–4 David Grace (ENG)
- David Gilbert (ENG) 4–0 Ian Burns (ENG)
- Craig Steadman (ENG) 3–4 Louis Heathcote (ENG)
- Anthony McGill (SCO) 3–4 Lee Walker (WAL)
- Rory McLeod (JAM) 4–0 Dominic Dale (WAL)
- Gary Wilson (ENG) 4–0 Jordan Brown (NIR)
- Robbie Williams (ENG) 3–4 Cao Yupeng (CHN)
- Mark Selby (ENG) (2) 4–1 Mark Lloyd (ENG)

== Century breaks ==
=== Main stage centuries ===
Total: 50

- 136, 123, 121, 113, 113, 110, 105 – John Higgins
- 135 – Noppon Saengkham
- 133, 128, 101, 100 – Mark Allen
- 132, 129 – Stuart Bingham
- 129 – Ronnie O'Sullivan
- 128, 111, 101 – Gary Wilson
- 128 – Fan Zhengyi
- 127, 120 – Kyren Wilson
- 127, 115, 110, 108 – David Gilbert
- 127 – Alfie Burden
- 127 – Louis Heathcote
- 123, 106, 102 – Jimmy Robertson
- 121, 109 – Ricky Walden
- 117 – Cao Yupeng
- 115 – Oliver Lines
- 114 – Jak Jones
- 113 – Liang Wenbo
- 113 – Matthew Stevens
- 110, 106, 103, 102 – Shaun Murphy
- 110 – Mark King
- 106 – Jack Lisowski
- 106 – Tian Pengfei
- 102, 100 – Mark Williams
- 102 – Neil Robertson
- 100, 100 – Judd Trump
- 100 – Yan Bingtao

=== Qualifying stage centuries ===
Total: 29

- 147 – Mark Allen
- 137 – Jack Lisowski
- 137 – Anthony McGill
- 137 – Chris Wakelin
- 125 – Soheil Vahedi
- 122, 121 – Yan Bingtao
- 120 – Ronnie O'Sullivan
- 117, 100 – Mitchell Mann
- 117 – Oliver Lines
- 116, 108 – David Gilbert
- 113 – Joe Perry
- 112, 101 – Mark Selby
- 112 – Jak Jones
- 111 – Matthew Stevens
- 111 – Thepchaiya Un-Nooh
- 110 – Martin Gould
- 109 – Mark Williams
- 108 – Noppon Saengkham
- 107 – Craig Steadman
- 105 – Wu Yize
- 104 – James Cahill
- 104 – Duane Jones
- 104 – Liang Wenbo
- 101 – Lyu Haotian
- 100 – Tian Pengfei
