= 2021 British Open =

Snooker tournament

2021 Matchroom.live British Open

Tournament information
- Dates: 16–22 August 2021
- Venue: Morningside Arena
- City: Leicester
- Country: England
- Organisation: World Snooker Tour
- Format: Ranking event
- Total prize fund: £470,000
- Winner's share: £100,000
- Highest break: John Higgins (SCO) (147); Ali Carter (ENG) (147)

Final
- Champion: Mark Williams (WAL)
- Runner-up: Gary Wilson (ENG)
- Score: 6–4

The 2021 British Open (officially the 2021 Matchroom.live British Open) was a professional snooker event played from 16 to 22 August 2021 at the Morningside Arena, Leicester, England. It was the 2021 edition of the British Open event, and the first since the 2004 British Open. It was the second ranking event of the 2021–22 snooker season, following the 2021 Championship League and preceding the 2021 Northern Ireland Open. It was broadcast by ITV Sport in the UK, and sponsored by Matchroom Sport. The winner received £100,000 from a total prize pool of £470,000.

All rounds in the tournament were played after a random draw made under a single-elimination tournament format with no seeded players. The first four rounds, from the last 128 to the last 16, were played as best-of-five frame matches, the quarter-finals and semi-finals as best-of-seven-frame matches, and the final played as the best-of-eleven frames. John Higgins, the defending champion from 2004, lost 1–3 to Ricky Walden in the third round. Mark Williams defeated Gary Wilson 6–4 in the final to win the 24th ranking title of his career. The event featured 32 century breaks, including two maximum breaks. Higgins made his 12th maximum break in professional competition in the first frame of his first-round win over Alexander Ursenbacher, and Ali Carter made his third maximum break in the second frame of his fourth-round match against Elliot Slessor.

== Format ==
The British Open is a snooker event first held in 1980 as the British Gold Cup. The event changed names to the British Open for the 1985 event won by Silvino Francisco. The 2021 tournament was held from 16 to 22 August 2021 at the Morningside Arena in Leicester, England. It was the first British Open event in 17 years, the last being played in 2004. It was the second ranking event of the 2021–22 snooker season, following the 2021 Championship League, and preceding the Northern Ireland Open. John Higgins was the defending champion, having defeated Stephen Maguire 9–6 in the 2004 final, to win his 16th ranking title. The event was broadcast by ITV4 in the United Kingdom, Eurosport in Europe; Liaoning TV, Superstar online, Kuaishou, Migu, Youku, Zhibo.tv and Huya Live in China; Now TV in Hong Kong; Sports cast in Taiwan; True Sports in Thailand; DAZN in Canada, Astrosport in Australia and by Matchroom Sport in all other territories. Matchroom also sponsored the event.

The event featured all 128 participants from the World Snooker Tour, no seedings, and a random draw after each round. Matches were played as the best-of-five frames, until the quarter-finals and semi-finals, which were played as best-of-seven-frame matches. The final was a best-of-eleven.

=== Prize fund ===
The tournament had a total prize fund of £470,000, the winner receiving £100,000. A breakdown of prize money for this event is shown below:

- Winner: £100,000
- Runner-up: £45,000
- Semi-final: £20,000
- Quarter-final: £12,000
- Last 16: £7,000
- Last 32: £5,000
- Last 64: £3,000
- Highest break: £5,000
- Total: £470,000

== Summary ==
=== Round 1 ===
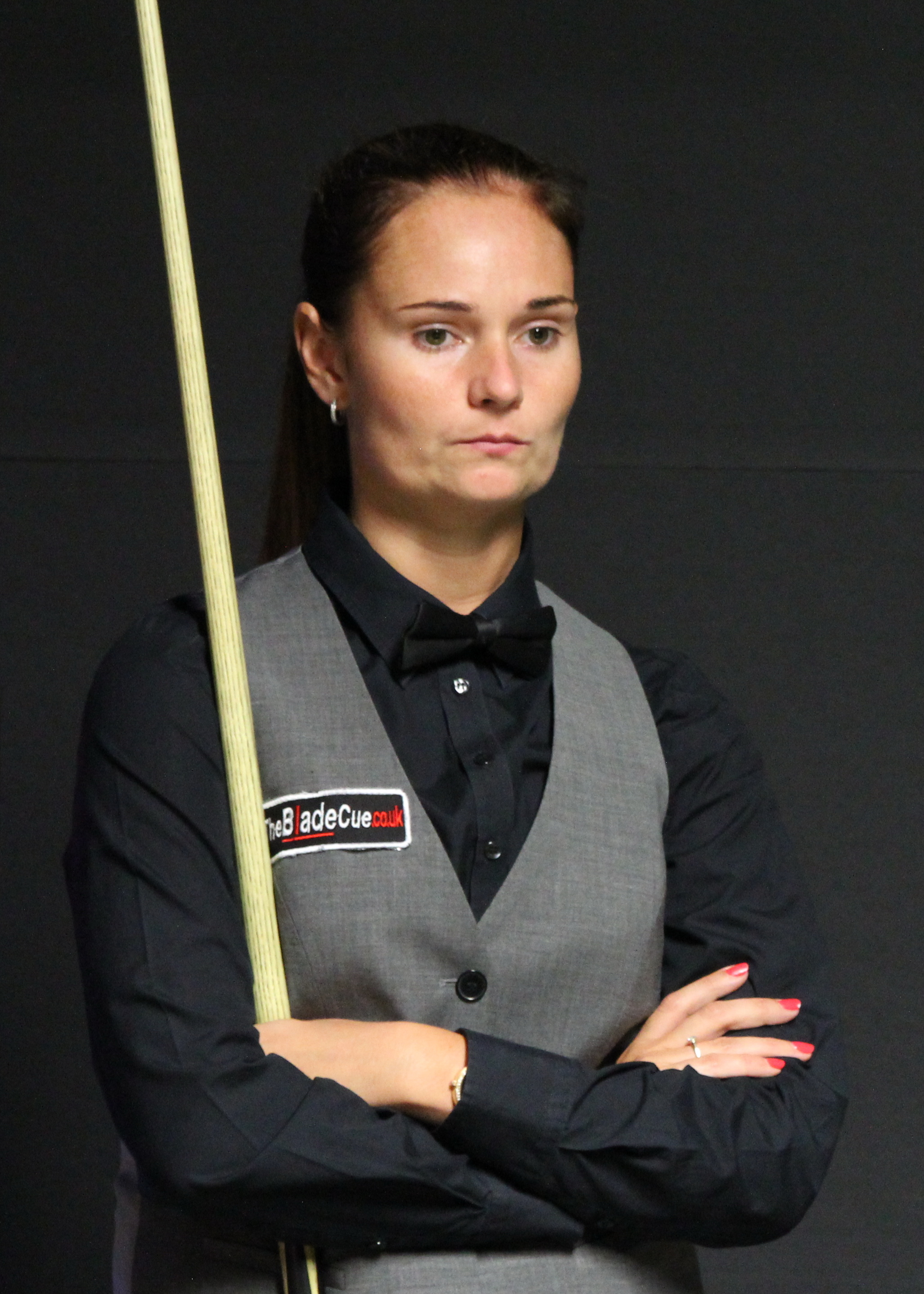
Reanne Evans met former partner Mark Allen in the first round, losing 2–3.

The first round was played from 16 to 18 August, as the best of five frames. On the first day, defending champion Higgins made his 12th competitive maximum break, in the first frame of his 3–1 win against Alexander Ursenbacher. At 46 years and 90 days, Higgins broke his own record as the oldest man to make a maximum break in competition. He had previously been the oldest player to make one after completing a maximum at the Championship League in October 2020. Higgins became the player with the second most maximum breaks, behind Ronnie O'Sullivan with 15, and now ahead of Stephen Hendry.

World number one Judd Trump trailed 1–2 to Mitchell Mann, but won 3–2. Despite making two century breaks, Kyren Wilson was defeated by Ashley Hugill 2–3. Mark Allen and Reanne Evans, who had been in a relationship between 2005 and 2008, met in the first round. The players, who had been in legal battles over child maintenance, had their first professional meeting at the event. Evans refused to shake hands with Allen before the match, and led 2–1, but missed the match ball and Allen completed a clearance to win the contest. The finalists of the 2021 World Snooker Championship, Shaun Murphy and Mark Selby met in the first round. World champion Selby won the match 3–2. Four-time winner Hendry met Chris Wakelin in the first round. Hendry won the match 3–2, his first main tournament win since rejoining the tour in 2020 after retiring in 2012. Lukas Kleckers won the final two frames against Masters champion Yan Bingtao to win 3–2.

=== Round 2 ===
The second round was played on 18 and 19 August as the best of five frames. The 1997 winner Mark Williams recovered from 0–2 behind to Dominic Dale in a 3–2 victory. Iranian player Hossein Vafaei defeated Allen 3–2, despite having never beaten him in four prior meetings. Stephen Maguire defeated Martin O'Donnell 3–2, but complained about O'Donnell's slow play, who had averaged more than 30 seconds per shot. Ali Carter described playing reigning world champion Selby as a "dream draw", and won the match 3–0. Higgins trailed Cao Yupeng 1–2, but made breaks of 95 and 96 to win the match. Higgins lost the third frame of the match after missing a shot, blaming the red ball having a stray hair on it. Hendry played Gary Wilson and lost 0–3. Neither player made a break above 50. Wilson called the performance "an embarrassment".

=== Rounds 3 and 4 ===
The third and fourth rounds were played on 20 August also as the best of five frames. Trump played Elliot Slessor losing 2–3. The loss meant that Selby would now be ranked as the world number one after the event. Slessor went on to face Carter in the fourth round. Carter made the second maximum break of the event in the second round, but only won that frame, losing 1–3. Ricky Walden completed a 3–1 win over Higgins, and then defeated Ross Muir by the same scoreline. Williams made breaks of 71 and 70 as he defeated Liam Highfield 3–0. Williams played Zhang Jiankang in the fourth round, where he was the sole player from the top 16 remaining. Zhang led 2–1 and was within four pots of winning the match, but missed a routine black ball, and eventually lost 2–3. David Gilbert, who had won his first ranking event at the preceding Championship League event, reached the quarter-finals where he drew Wilson, who had defeated Vafaei.

=== Quarter-finals ===
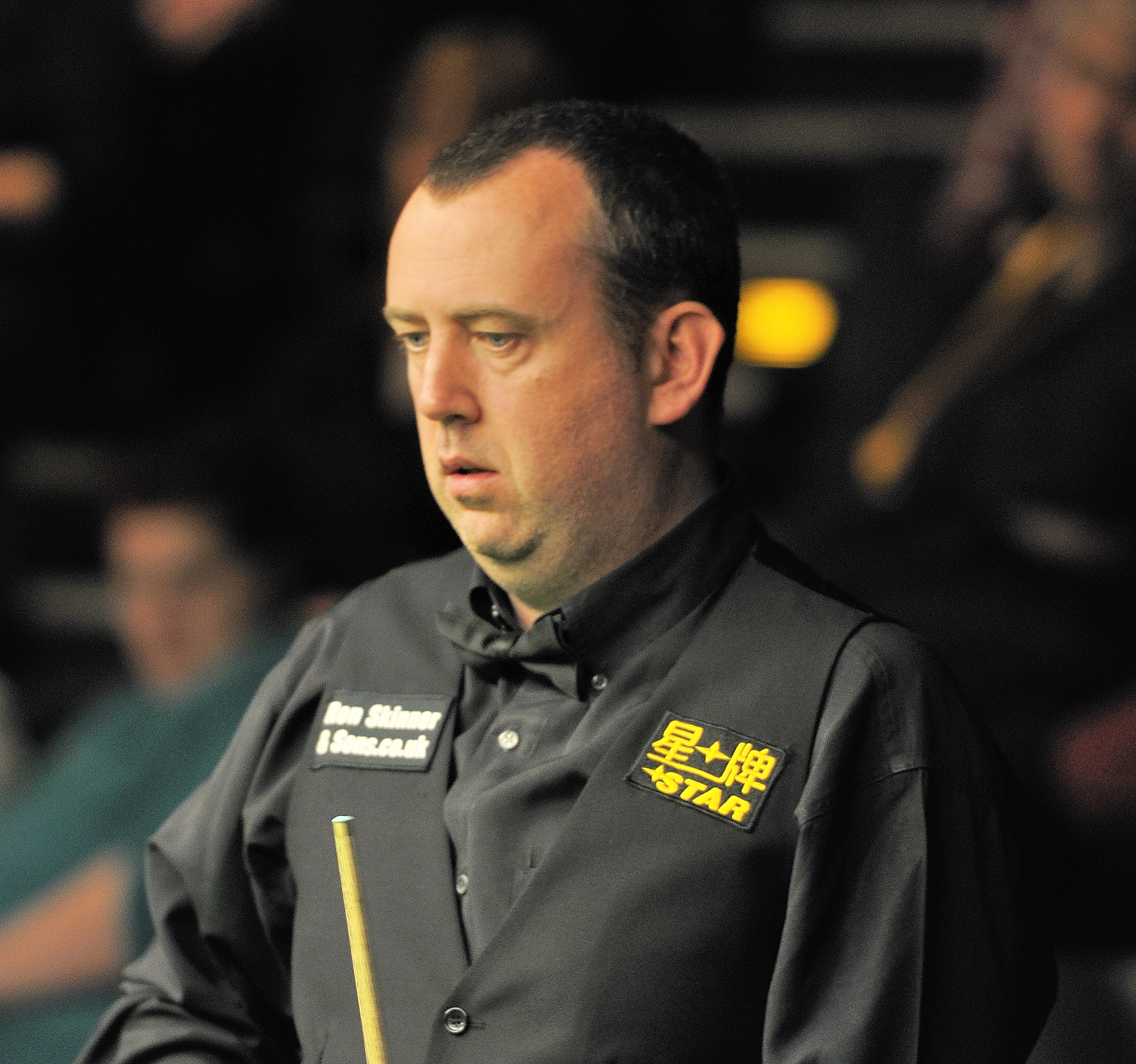
Mark Williams won the event, 24 years since he won the event previously in 1997.

The quarter-finals were played on 21 August as the best of seven frames. Gilbert played Wilson, and led both 2–0 and 3–2, but lost the match after missing a pot using a long rest. Slessor met Zhou Yuelong and won 4–3 to reach his second ranking event semi-final. Williams played Ricky Walden in the quarter-finals. Williams won 4–3 on the final black, despite Walden making four breaks over 50. Williams commented that despite the win, he "couldn't string three pots together", and that the players he had faced in the tournament had lost matches, rather than him winning them. Robertson played Lu Ning in the final quarter-final match, winning 4–2.

=== Semi-finals ===
The semi-finals were contested on 21 August as the best of seven frames. Wilson played Slessor, but trailed 0–2. He won the next three frames with breaks of 67, 68 and 100 to lead 3–2, before Slessor made a 125 break to force a deciding frame. Wilson won the frame to reach his second ranking final. Williams completed breaks of 60, 73 and 58 in a 4–1 win over Robertson.

=== Final ===
The final was played between Williams and Wilson on 22 August as the best of eleven frames. Williams won the opening frame, before Wilson tied the match in frame two. A break of 111 in frame three for Williams was his first century break of the event, before Wilson won frame four. Wilson won frame five with a break of 101 to lead the match for the first time, Williams winning back-to-back frames to lead 4–3. Wilson won frame eight to tie the match, but Williams won the next two frames to complete a 6–4 victory. This was Williams's 24th ranking event title, and his second British Open title, 24 years since he last won the event in 1997. Aged 46, Williams was the third oldest person to win a ranking event, only behind Ray Reardon in 1982 (50) and Doug Mountjoy in 1989 (46). Williams commented that he had been lucky to progress to the final, but that his performance in the final was the best he had played in the tournament. Wilson said he was "bitterly disappointed" not to win.

== Tournament draw ==
The results from the event are shown below. Players in bold denote match winners.
Note: w/d=withdrawn; w/o=walk-over

=== Round 1 ===
Round 1 matches were played as the best of five frames.

==== 16 August morning session ====
- **Rory McLeod** (JAM) **w/o**–w/d Kurt Maflin (NOR) (Note: Kurt Maflin was due to play Rory McLeod, but withdrew from the event. He was not replaced so McLeod received a walkover.)
- **Robbie Williams** (ENG) **3**–1 Sunny Akani (THA)
- Zhang Anda (CHN) 1–**3** **John Astley** (ENG)
- Steven Hallworth (ENG) 2–**3** **Joe O'Connor** (ENG)
- **Xu Si** (CHN) **3**–2 Fan Zhengyi (CHN)
- Andrew Higginson (ENG) 2–**3** **Jordan Brown** (NIR)
- **Liang Wenbo** (CHN) **3**–1 Simon Lichtenberg (GER)
- **Jak Jones** (WAL) **3**–2 Lyu Haotian (CHN)
- **Dylan Emery** (WAL) **3**–2 Gao Yang (CHN) (Note: Dylan Emery replaced Jamie O'Neill who was suspended from the event because of digressing from Covid policies.)

==== 16 August afternoon session ====
- Alexander Ursenbacher (SUI) 1–**3** **John Higgins** (SCO) (Note: John Higgins made a 147 in the first frame.)
- Yuan Sijun (CHN) 2–**3** **Louis Heathcote** (ENG)
- Ben Woollaston (ENG) 2–**3** **Hammad Miah** (ENG)
- **Chen Zifan** (CHN) **3**–0 Farakh Ajaib (PAK)
- **Mark Williams** (WAL) **3**–0 Tian Pengfei (CHN)
- Zak Surety (ENG) 0–**3** **Ken Doherty** (IRL)
- Aaron Hill (IRL) 0–**3** **Jimmy White** (ENG)
- Gerard Greene (NIR) 2–**3** **Martin O'Donnell** (ENG)

==== 16 August evening session ====
- Ashley Carty (ENG) 0–**3** **Bai Langning** (CHN)
- **David Lilley** (ENG) **3**–1 Craig Steadman (ENG)
- **Matthew Selt** (ENG) **3**–2 Thepchaiya Un-Nooh (THA)
- Mitchell Mann (ENG) 2–**3** **Judd Trump** (ENG)
- **Ian Burns** (ENG) **3**–1 Michael White (WAL)
- Stuart Carrington (ENG) 0–**3** **Liam Highfield** (ENG)
- **Zhou Yuelong** (CHN) **3**–2 Tom Ford (ENG)
- **Mark Allen** (NIR) **3**–2 Reanne Evans (ENG)

==== 17 August morning session ====
- **Dominic Dale** (WAL) **3**–0 Xiao Guodong (CHN)
- **Wu Yize** (CHN) **3**–0 Fraser Patrick (SCO)
- **Lu Ning** (CHN) **3**–1 Igor Figueiredo (BRA)
- **Lee Walker** (WAL) **3**–1 Sanderson Lam (ENG)
- Anthony McGill (SCO) 1–**3** **Zhao Jianbo** (CHN)
- **Zhang Jiankang** (CHN) **3**–1 Peter Lines (ENG)
- **Andy Hicks** (ENG) **3**–1 Chang Bingyu (CHN)
- **David Grace** (ENG) **3**–2 Mark Lloyd (ENG)

==== 17 August afternoon session ====
- **Ashley Hugill** (ENG) **3**–2 Kyren Wilson (ENG)
- **Elliot Slessor** (ENG) **3**–1 Peter Devlin (ENG)
- **Jimmy Robertson** (ENG) **3**–0 Mark Joyce (ENG)
- **Stephen Maguire** (SCO) **3**–0 Jackson Page (WAL)
- Dean Young (SCO) 0–**3** **Scott Donaldson** (SCO)
- Joe Perry (ENG) 2–**3** **Ben Hancorn** (ENG)
- Iulian Boiko (UKR) 2–**3** **Anthony Hamilton** (ENG)
- Jack Lisowski (ENG) 2–**3** **Barry Pinches** (ENG)

==== 17 August evening session ====
- Michael Judge (IRL) 1–**3** **Andrew Pagett** (WAL)
- James Cahill (ENG) 2–**3** **Ricky Walden** (ENG)
- Michael Holt (ENG) 2–**3** **Mark Davis** (ENG)
- **Mark Selby** (ENG) **3**–2 Shaun Murphy (ENG)
- **David Gilbert** (ENG) **3**–0 Matthew Stevens (WAL)
- Jamie Jones (WAL) 1–**3** **Hossein Vafaei** (IRN)
- Chris Wakelin (ENG) 2–**3** **Stephen Hendry** (SCO)
- **Ross Muir** (SCO) **3**–2 Ryan Day (WAL)

==== 18 August morning session ====
- Si Jiahui (CHN) 0–**3** **Oliver Lines** (ENG)
- Zhao Xintong (CHN) 2–**3** **Cao Yupeng** (CHN)
- **Michael Georgiou** (CYP) **3**–0 Soheil Vahedi (IRN)
- Jamie Clarke (WAL) 0–**3** **Pang Junxu** (CHN)
- **Li Hang** (CHN) **3**–0 Sam Craigie (ENG)
- **Ali Carter** (ENG) **3**–2 Lei Peifan (CHN)
- **Duane Jones** (WAL) **3**–1 Nigel Bond (ENG)

==== 18 August afternoon session ====
- Jamie Wilson (ENG) 1–**3** **Mark King** (ENG)
- Sean Maddocks (ENG) 0–**3** **Noppon Saengkham** (THA)
- Barry Hawkins (ENG) 2–**3** **Luca Brecel** (BEL)
- **Lukas Kleckers** (GER) **3**–2 Yan Bingtao (CHN)
- Fergal O'Brien (IRL) 0–**3** **Gary Wilson** (ENG)
- **Stuart Bingham** (ENG) **3**–2 Robert Milkins (ENG)
- Alfie Burden (ENG) 1–**3** **Allan Taylor** (ENG)
- Graeme Dott (SCO) 1–**3** **Martin Gould** (ENG)

=== Round 2 ===
Round 2 matches were played as the best of five frames.

==== 18 August evening session ====
- **Mark Williams** (WAL) **3**–2 Dominic Dale (WAL)
- **Liam Highfield** (ENG) **3**–2 Chen Zifan (CHN)
- Martin O'Donnell (ENG) 2–**3** **Stephen Maguire** (SCO)
- **Ben Hancorn** (ENG) **3**–2 Scott Donaldson (SCO)
- **Zhou Yuelong** (CHN) **3**–0 Andy Hicks (ENG)
- **Hossein Vafaei** (IRN) **3**–2 Mark Allen (NIR)
- David Lilley (ENG) 0–**3** **Jordan Brown** (NIR)
- Ashley Hugill (ENG) 2–**3** **Anthony Hamilton** (ENG)

==== 19 August morning session ====
- Liang Wenbo (CHN) 1–**3** **Hammad Miah** (ENG)
- **Xu Si** (CHN) **3**–0 Barry Pinches (ENG)
- Ian Burns (ENG) 0–**3** **Duane Jones** (WAL)
- Noppon Saengkham (THA) 2–**3** **Jimmy Robertson** (ENG)
- **Luca Brecel** (BEL) **3**–1 Zhao Jianbo (CHN)
- **Ricky Walden** (ENG) **3**–1 Robbie Williams (ENG)
- Mark Davis (ENG) 1–**3** **Jak Jones** (WAL)
- Rory McLeod (JAM) 0–**3** **Ross Muir** (SCO)

==== 19 August afternoon session ====
- **Elliot Slessor** (ENG) **3**–1 Wu Yize (CHN)
- **Matthew Selt** (ENG) **3**–0 Michael Georgiou (CYP)
- **David Gilbert** (ENG) **3**–1 John Astley (ENG)
- Cao Yupeng (CHN) 2–**3** **John Higgins** (SCO)
- **Oliver Lines** (ENG) **3**–0 David Grace (ENG)
- **Gary Wilson** (ENG) **3**–0 Stephen Hendry (SCO)
- **Allan Taylor** (ENG) **3**–0 Jimmy White (ENG)
- **Lee Walker** (WAL) **3**–2 Mark King (ENG)

==== 19 August evening session ====
- Li Hang (CHN) 0–**3** **Zhang Jiankang** (CHN)
- Mark Selby (ENG) 0–**3** **Ali Carter** (ENG)
- Martin Gould (ENG) 1–**3** **Lu Ning** (CHN)
- Stuart Bingham (ENG) 1–**3** **Judd Trump** (ENG)
- **Lukas Kleckers** (GER) **3**–2 Louis Heathcote (ENG)
- **Pang Junxu** (CHN) **3**–1 Bai Langning (CHN)
- **Joe O'Connor** (ENG) **3**–1 Ken Doherty (IRL)
- Dylan Emery (WAL) 2–**3** **Andrew Pagett** (WAL)

=== Round 3 ===
Round 3 matches were played as the best of five frames.

==== 20 August morning session ====
- Liam Highfield (ENG) 0–**3** **Mark Williams** (WAL)
- Matthew Selt (ENG) 1–**3** **Zhou Yuelong** (CHN)
- Allan Taylor (ENG) 1–**3** **Ross Muir** (SCO)
- Andrew Pagett (WAL) 0–**3** **David Gilbert** (ENG)
- Jak Jones (WAL) 2–**3** **Hossein Vafaei** (IRN)
- Xu Si (CHN) 0–**3** **Gary Wilson** (ENG)
- Duane Jones (WAL) 2–**3** **Jimmy Robertson** (ENG)
- **Joe O'Connor** (ENG) **3**–2 Anthony Hamilton (ENG)

==== 20 August afternoon session ====
- Ben Hancorn (ENG) 1–**3** **Lu Ning** (CHN)
- **Ricky Walden** (ENG) **3**–1 John Higgins (SCO)
- **Ali Carter** (ENG) **3**–1 Oliver Lines (ENG)
- **Lukas Kleckers** (GER) **3**–0 Lee Walker (WAL)
- **Hammad Miah** (ENG) **3**–1 Luca Brecel (BEL)
- **Stephen Maguire** (SCO) **3**–0 Jordan Brown (NIR)
- Judd Trump (ENG) 2–**3** **Elliot Slessor** (ENG)
- **Zhang Jiankang** (CHN) **3**–1 Pang Junxu (CHN)

=== Round 4 ===
Round 4 matches were played as the best of five frames.

==== 20 August evening session ====
- **Jimmy Robertson** (ENG) **3**–0 Stephen Maguire (SCO)
- **Ricky Walden** (ENG) **3**–1 Ross Muir (SCO)
- Ali Carter (ENG) 1–**3** **Elliot Slessor** (ENG) (Note: Ali Carter made a 147 in the second frame.)
- **David Gilbert** (ENG) **3**–0 Hammad Miah (ENG)
- Joe O'Connor (ENG) 2–**3** **Zhou Yuelong** (CHN)
- **Lu Ning** (CHN) **3**–0 Lukas Kleckers (GER)
- Zhang Jiankang (CHN) 2–**3** **Mark Williams** (WAL)
- Hossein Vafaei (IRN) 2–**3** **Gary Wilson** (ENG)

=== Quarter-finals ===
The quarter final matches were played as the best of seven frames.

==== 21 August afternoon session ====
- David Gilbert (ENG) 3–**4** **Gary Wilson** (ENG)
- Zhou Yuelong (CHN) 3–**4** **Elliot Slessor** (ENG)
- **Mark Williams** (WAL) **4**–3 Ricky Walden (ENG)
- Lu Ning (CHN) 2–**4** **Jimmy Robertson** (ENG)

=== Semi-finals ===
The semi final matches were played as the best of seven frames.

==== 21 August evening session ====
- **Gary Wilson** (ENG) **4**–3 Elliot Slessor (ENG)
- **Mark Williams** (WAL) **4**–1 Jimmy Robertson (ENG)

=== Final ===
The frame scores for the final are shown below. Numbers in brackets show breaks made during that frame.

Final: Best of 11 frames. Referee: Leo Scullion; Morningside Arena, Leicester, England, 22 August 2021.
Gary Wilson; England	4–**6**	**Mark Williams**; Wales
Frame Scores: 8–**82**, **72**–0, 1–**133** (111), **73**–18, **101**–0 (101), 24–**85**, 0–**81**, **73**–42, 0–**140** (115), 15–**62**
101	Highest break	**115**
1	Century breaks	**2**

== Century breaks ==
There were 32 century breaks made during the event. Both Higgins and Carter compiled maximum breaks of 147 during the event. Higgins made one in the first frame of his first-round win over Ursenbacher, while Carter's maximum was completed during the second frame of his fourth-round loss to Slessor.

- 147, 107 – Ali Carter
- 147 – John Higgins
- 135, 112 – David Gilbert
- 134 – Zhang Anda
- 133 – Yuan Sijun
- 129, 125 – Elliot Slessor
- 126 – Jimmy Robertson
- 124, 109 – Zhou Yuelong
- 121 – Hossein Vafaei
- 118, 117 – Luca Brecel
- 118 – Barry Hawkins
- 117 – Michael Holt
- 117 – Michael White
- 115, 111 – Mark Williams
- 115, 101 – Kyren Wilson
- 114, 106, 101, 100 – Gary Wilson
- 111 – Lu Ning
- 110 – Anthony McGill
- 108 – Wu Yize
- 107 – Jordan Brown
- 104 – Ian Burns
- 104 – Anthony Hamilton
