= Tyler Rees =

Welsh snooker player

Personal information
- Nickname: Marathon Man
- Born: 6 February 1999 (age 27) Llanelli, Carmarthenshire

Sport
- Country: Wales
- Sport: Snooker

Tyler Rees (born 6 February 1999 in Llanelli, Carmarthenshire) is a Welsh amateur snooker player. He was Under-18 European Snooker Champion in 2016.

== Career ==
In February 2016, Rees entered the 2016 EBSA European Under-18 Snooker Championship as the number 15 seed, he managed to advance to the final where he defeated fellow countryman Jackson Page 5–2 in the final to win the inaugural championship. As a result, Rees was awarded a place in the qualifying rounds for the 2016 World Snooker Championship. He lost 10–0 there to Jimmy Robertson. The following season Rees was awarded a wildcard entry in the 2017 Welsh Open. However he was defeated in the first round 4-1 by Jamie Jones. Rees was again awarded with a place in the qualifying rounds for the World Championship, where once again he was defeated at the first hurdle, losing 10–2 to China's Xiao Guodong.

== Performance and rankings timeline ==
Tournament	2013/ 14	2015/ 16	2016/ 17	2017/ 18	2018/ 19	2019/ 20
Ranking (Note: It shows the ranking at the beginning of the season.)	(Note: He was an amateur.)					
Ranking tournaments
Welsh Open	A	A	LQ	A	A	A
Players Championship (Note: The event was called the Players Championship Grand Final (2013/2014–2015/2016))	DNQ	DNQ	DNQ	DNQ	DNQ	DNQ
World Championship	A	LQ	LQ	LQ	A	LQ
Former ranking tournaments
Paul Hunter Classic	A	A	A	LQ	LQ	NR

Performance Table Legend
LQ	lost in the qualifying draw	#R	lost in the early rounds of the tournament (WR = Wildcard round, RR = Round robin)	QF	lost in the quarter-finals
SF	lost in the semi-finals	F	lost in the final	W	won the tournament
DNQ	did not qualify for the tournament	A	did not participate in the tournament	WD	withdrew from the tournament

NH / Not Held	means an event was not held.
NR / Non-Ranking Event	means an event is/was no longer a ranking event.
R / Ranking Event	means an event is/was a ranking event.
MR / Minor-Ranking Event	means an event is/was a minor-ranking event.

== Career finals ==
=== Amateur finals: 3 (1 title) ===
Outcome	No.	Year	Championship	Opponent in the final	Score
Winner	1.	2016	EBSA European Under-18 Snooker Championships	(Wales) Jackson Page	5–2
Runner-up	1.	2018	EBSA European Under-21 Snooker Championships	(Germany) Simon Lichtenberg	3–6
Runner-up	2.	2020	Challenge Tour - Event 8	(Germany) Lukas Kleckers	1–3
