= 2019 Northern Ireland Open =

Snooker tournament

2019 19.com Northern Ireland Open

Tournament information
- Dates: 11–17 November 2019
- Venue: Waterfront Hall
- City: Belfast
- Country: Northern Ireland
- Organisation: World Snooker
- Format: Ranking event
- Total prize fund: £405,000
- Winner's share: £70,000
- Highest break: Stuart Bingham (ENG) (147)

Final
- Champion: Judd Trump (ENG)
- Runner-up: Ronnie O'Sullivan (ENG)
- Score: 9–7

The 2019 Northern Ireland Open (officially the 2019 19.com Northern Ireland Open) was a professional snooker tournament that took place from 11 to 17 November 2019 at the Waterfront Hall in Belfast, Northern Ireland. The fourth edition of the Northern Ireland Open, it was the sixth ranking event of the 2019–20 snooker season, the second tournament of the Home Nations Series. Featuring a prize fund of £405,000, the winner received £70,000. The event was broadcast on Eurosport and Quest domestically and was sponsored by betting company 19.com.

The defending champion was Judd Trump, who had defeated Ronnie O'Sullivan 9–7 in the 2018 final. The pair both reached the final in 2019, with Trump successfully defending the title, defeating O'Sullivan by the same scoreline. Stuart Bingham scored the highest break of the tournament, compiling a maximum break in the first frame of his first round match with Lu Ning, the sixth of his career.

== Format ==
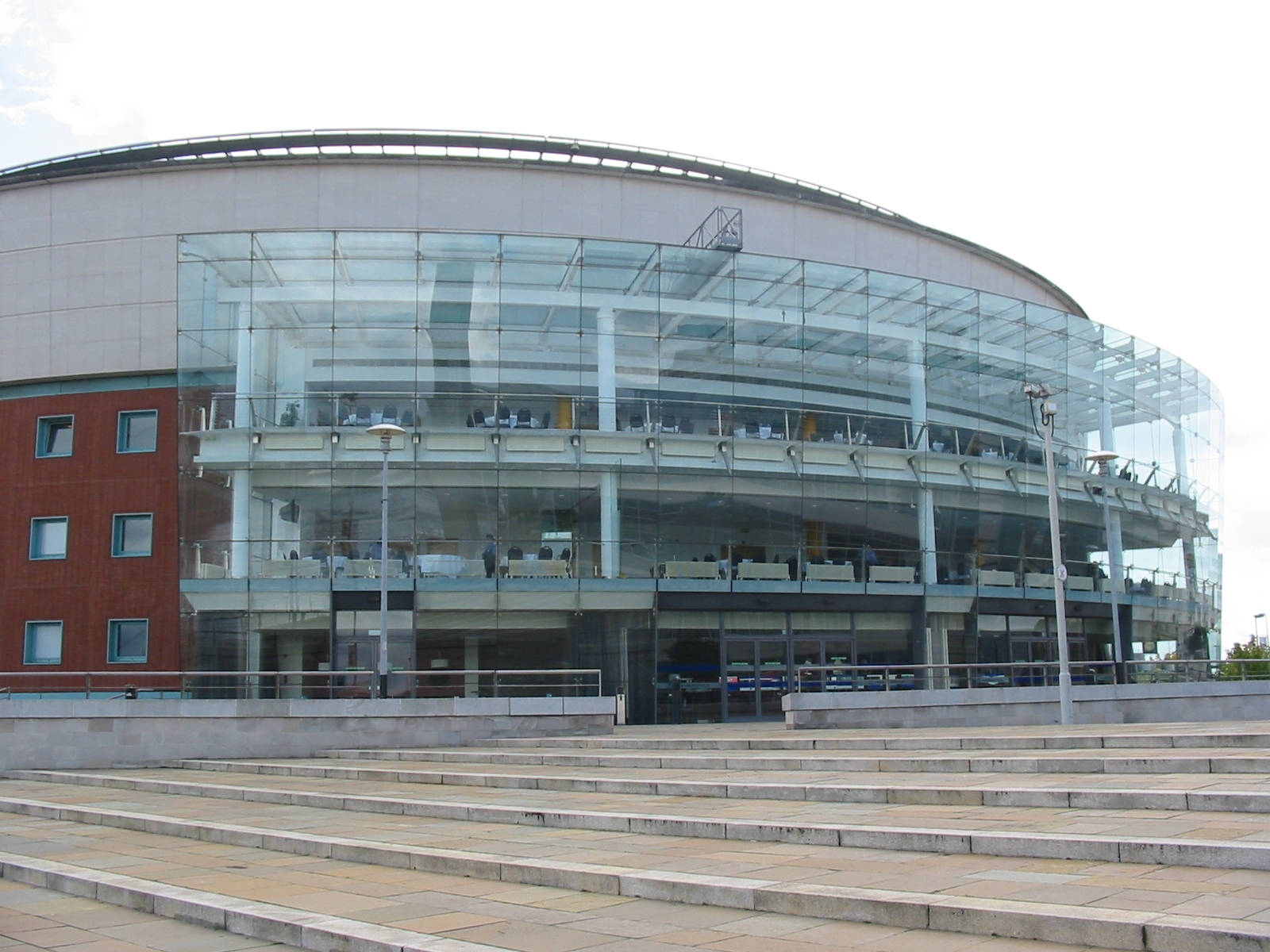
The event took place at the Waterfront Hall in Belfast.

The Northern Ireland Open was first played in 2016, and was won by Mark King. The 2019 event was the second of four Home Nations Series events, and the sixth world ranking tournament of the 2019–20 snooker season. The event took place from 11 to 17 November 2019 at the Waterfront Hall in Belfast, Northern Ireland. and followed the World Open, and preceded the UK Championship.

The defending champion was Judd Trump, who had won the 2018 event by defeating Ronnie O'Sullivan 9–7. All matches were played as the best of 7 frames in the first four rounds, at which point the number increased: 9 in the quarter-finals; 11 in the semi-finals; and the best of 19 frames in the final. Chinese sports prediction website 19.com sponsored the event, which was broadcast in Europe and Australia by Eurosport; CCTV, Superstars Online, Youku and Zhibo.tv in China; True sport in Thailand; Sky Sports in New Zealand and DAZN in Canada.

=== Prize fund ===
The breakdown of prize money for the event is shown below:

- Winner: £70,000
- Runner-up: £30,000
- Semi-final: £20,000
- Quarter-final: £10,000
- Last 16: £7,500
- Last 32: £4,000
- Last 64: £3,000
- Highest break: £5,000
- Total: £405,000

== Tournament summary ==
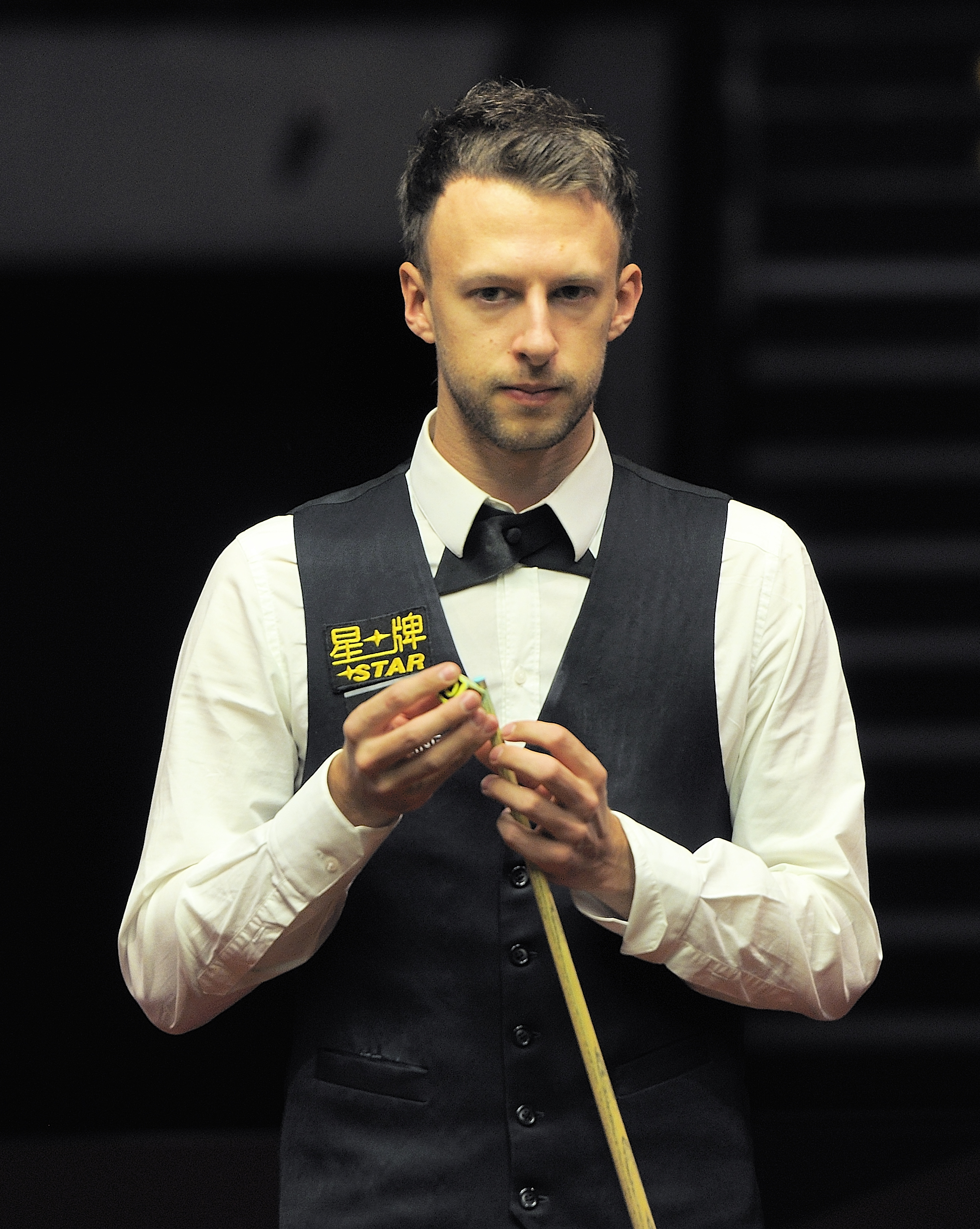
Judd Trump won the event, retaining the trophy after a 9–7 win in the final.

The first four rounds were played from 11 to 14 November as the best of seven frames. Defending champion Trump defeated James Cahill in the opening round, then beat three Chinese players Zhang Anda, Si Jiahui and Yan Bingtao, whilst unseeded player Anthony Hamilton defeated Tom Ford, Rod Lawler and eighth seed Kyren Wilson to reach the quarter-finals. Fifth seed Mark Selby defeated Xu Si, Matthew Stevens, Luca Brecel and Ken Doherty in qualifying for the quarter-finals where he would meet John Higgins as he defeated Chang Bingyu, Kacper Filipiak, Billy Joe Castle, and 2019 World Cup partner Stephen Maguire. Fourteenth seed Joe Perry defeated Zhao Xintong, Ross Bulman, Graeme Dott and Robbie Williams to play Alexander Ursenbacher in the quarter-finals, who overcame Xiao Guodong and Martin O'Donnell in the opening two rounds. In the third round, he met Stuart Bingham, who made the highest break of the event, a maximum break of 147 in the first frame of his opening round win over Lu Ning, the sixth of Bingham's career. Ursenbacher defeated Bingham 4–2, and then sixth seed Mark Allen 4–3. Seventh seed Shaun Murphy overcame Fraser Patrick, Luo Honghao, Ricky Walden and Barry Hawkins to meet Ronnie O'Sullivan, who defeated Oliver Lines, Lei Peifan, Stuart Carrington and Yuan Sijun.

The quarter-finals were played on 15 November as the best of nine frames. Trump defeated Hamilton 5–1, the same scoreline that O'Sullivan defeated Murphy, whilst Perry defeated Ursenbacher 5–3. Higgins led Selby 4–2, but led 66–0 in frame seven. Selby, however, took more than six minutes to take a single shot, more time than the fastest ever maximum break. Selby won the frame, and tied the match at 4–4, but Higgins won the deciding frame to win 5–4. The semi-finals were played as the best of 11 frames on 16 November. Higgins led Trump at 3–2 in the first, but Trump won the next four frames to progress to the final. A pot on the black ball by Trump in frame eight where he played the cue ball around the table to make a cannon was described by fellow players such as Jimmy White, Mark Allen and opponent Higgins as "one of the best shots ever played". The second semi-final was held between O'Sullivan and Perry. O'Sullivan won all of the first five frames, before winning the match 6–1.

The final was played between Trump and O'Sullivan on 17 November as the best of 17 frames, held over two sessions. Trump won the opening two frames, and led 3–1 after a break of 123 in the fourth. He also led 5–3 after the opening session, despite missing an attempt for a maximum break in frame seven. Upon the restart, O'Sullivan won frame nine, before Trump opened up a three frame lead by winning the next two. O'Sullivan won two frames in a row, to trail by a frame, but Trump made a break of 124 to lead 8–6. Making his second century break of the final, a 135, O'Sullivan won frame 15, but Trump made a break of 84 to win the match 9–7.

The win was Trump's 14th ranking event victory. After the match, Trump commented: "To defend any title is always difficult but to do it against Ronnie [O'Sullivan] is extra special...You've got to play [your best] against Ronnie otherwise you lose." O'Sullivan praised his opponent after the match, commenting that he "enjoyed watching" Trump's play. The pair would also contest the following season's event, with Trump again winning over O'Sullivan by the same scoreline.

== Main draw ==
The results from the event are shown below. Seeded players have their seedings in brackets. Players highlighted in bold denote match winners.

=== Qualifying round ===
Patrick Wallace (NIR) 4–0 Robbie McGuigan (NIR)

=== Top half ===
==== Section 1 ====
Last 128; Best of 7 frames
**Judd Trump (ENG) (1)**	**4**
James Cahill (ENG)	3
**Zhang Anda (CHN)**	**4**
Simon Lichtenberg (GER)	1
Hossein Vafaei (IRN) (32)	0
**Si Jiahui (CHN)**	**4**
**Chen Zifan (CHN)**	**4**
Patrick Wallace (NIR)	2
**Ali Carter (ENG) (16)**	**4**
Robert Milkins (ENG)	1
**Li Hang (CHN)**	**4**
Elliot Slessor (ENG)	1
**Yan Bingtao (CHN) (17)**	**4**
Andy Hicks (ENG)	2
**Marco Fu (HKG)**	**4**
Gerard Greene (NIR)	1

Last 64; Best of 7 frames
**Judd Trump (ENG) (1)**	**4**
Zhang Anda (CHN)	1
**Si Jiahui (CHN)**	**4**
Chen Zifan (CHN)	1
**Ali Carter (ENG) (16)**	**4**
Li Hang (CHN)	3
**Yan Bingtao (CHN) (17)**	**4**
Marco Fu (HKG)	1

Last 32; Best of 7 frames
**Judd Trump (ENG) (1)**	**4**
Si Jiahui (CHN)	0
Ali Carter (ENG) (16)	3
**Yan Bingtao (CHN) (17)**	**4**

Last 16; Best of 7 frames
**Judd Trump (ENG) (1)**	**4**
Yan Bingtao (CHN) (17)	0

==== Section 2 ====
Last 128; Best of 7 frames
Ashley Carty (ENG)	1
**Rod Lawler (ENG)**	**4**
Tom Ford (ENG) (24)	0
**Andrew Higginson (ENG)**	**4**
Thor Chuan Leong (MYS)	1
**Jak Jones (WAL)**	**4**
David Gilbert (ENG) (9)	3
**Anthony Hamilton (ENG)**	**4**
**Liang Wenbo (CHN)**	**4**
Kurt Maflin (NOR)	1
Lyu Haotian (CHN) (25)	1
**Tian Pengfei (CHN)**	**4**
**Peter Ebdon (ENG)**	**4**
Jimmy White (ENG)	2
**Kyren Wilson (ENG) (8)**	**4**
Alan McManus (SCO)	0

Last 64; Best of 7 frames
Rod Lawler (ENG)	2
**Andrew Higginson (ENG)**	**4**
Jak Jones (WAL)	0
**Anthony Hamilton (ENG)**	**4**
Liang Wenbo (CHN)	2
**Tian Pengfei (CHN)**	**4**
Peter Ebdon (ENG)	1
**Kyren Wilson (ENG) (8)**	**4**

Last 32; Best of 7 frames
Andrew Higginson (ENG)	3
**Anthony Hamilton (ENG)**	**4**
Tian Pengfei (CHN)	2
**Kyren Wilson (ENG) (8)**	**4**

Last 16; Best of 7 frames
**Anthony Hamilton (ENG)**	**4**
Kyren Wilson (ENG) (8)	3

==== Section 3 ====
Last 128; Best of 7 frames
**Mark Selby (ENG) (5)**	**4**
Xu Si (CHN)	2
**Matthew Stevens (WAL)**	**4**
Chris Wakelin (ENG)	1
**Matthew Selt (ENG) (28)**	**4**
Daniel Wells (WAL)	2
Adam Stefanow (POL)	0
**Luca Brecel (BEL)**	**4**
Jack Lisowski (ENG) (12)	3
**Soheil Vahedi (IRN)**	**4**
**Ken Doherty (IRL)**	**4**
Michael Georgiou (CYP)	2
**Thepchaiya Un-Nooh (THA) (21)**	**4**
Mark King (ENG)	2
Peter Lines (ENG)	1
**Mei Xiwen (CHN)**	**4**

Last 64; Best of 7 frames
**Mark Selby (ENG) (5)**	**4**
Matthew Stevens (WAL)	1
Matthew Selt (ENG) (28)	0
**Luca Brecel (BEL)**	**4**
Soheil Vahedi (IRN)	0
**Ken Doherty (IRL)**	**4**
**Thepchaiya Un-Nooh (THA) (21)**	**4**
Mei Xiwen (CHN)	2

Last 32; Best of 7 frames
**Mark Selby (ENG) (5)**	**4**
Luca Brecel (BEL)	2
**Ken Doherty (IRL)**	**4**
Thepchaiya Un-Nooh (THA) (21)	3

Last 16; Best of 7 frames
**Mark Selby (ENG) (5)**	**4**
Ken Doherty (IRL)	1

==== Section 4 ====
Last 128; Best of 7 frames
**Mitchell Mann (ENG)**	**4**
Liam Highfield (ENG)	1
Ryan Day (WAL) (20)	1
**Harvey Chandler (ENG)**	**4**
Mike Dunn (ENG)	2
**Mark Davis (ENG)**	**4**
**Stephen Maguire (SCO) (13)**	**4**
Declan Lavery (NIR)	0
**Chen Feilong (CHN)**	**4**
Kishan Hirani (WAL)	2
Noppon Saengkham (THA) (29)	3
**Billy Joe Castle (ENG)**	**4**
Riley Parsons (ENG)	3
**Kacper Filipiak (POL)**	**4**
**John Higgins (SCO) (4)**	**4**
Chang Bingyu (CHN)	2

Last 64; Best of 7 frames
Mitchell Mann (ENG)	1
**Harvey Chandler (ENG)**	**4**
Mark Davis (ENG)	2
**Stephen Maguire (SCO) (13)**	**4**
Chen Feilong (CHN)	3
**Billy Joe Castle (ENG)**	**4**
Kacper Filipiak (POL)	1
**John Higgins (SCO) (4)**	**4**

Last 32; Best of 7 frames
Harvey Chandler (ENG)	2
**Stephen Maguire (SCO) (13)**	**4**
Billy Joe Castle (ENG)	1
**John Higgins (SCO) (4)**	**4**

Last 16; Best of 7 frames
Stephen Maguire (SCO) (13)	3
**John Higgins (SCO) (4)**	**4**

=== Bottom half ===
==== Section 5 ====
Last 128; Best of 7 frames
Neil Robertson (AUS) (3)	3
**Mark Joyce (ENG)**	**4**
**Jackson Page (WAL)**	**4**
Barry Pinches (ENG)	3
Anthony McGill (SCO) (30)	1
**Robbie Williams (ENG)**	**4**
**Hammad Miah (ENG)**	**4**
Martin Gould (ENG)	1
**Joe Perry (ENG) (14)**	**4**
Zhao Xintong (CHN)	2
**Ross Bulman (IRL)**	**4**
Zhang Jiankang (CHN)	1
**Graeme Dott (SCO) (19)**	**4**
Duane Jones (WAL)	2
Bai Langning (CHN)	1
**Craig Steadman (ENG)**	**4**

Last 64; Best of 7 frames
**Mark Joyce (ENG)**	**4**
Jackson Page (WAL)	2
**Robbie Williams (ENG)**	**4**
Hammad Miah (ENG)	1
**Joe Perry (ENG) (14)**	**4**
Ross Bulman (IRL)	2
**Graeme Dott (SCO) (19)**	**4**
Craig Steadman (ENG)	1

Last 32; Best of 7 frames
Mark Joyce (ENG)	3
**Robbie Williams (ENG)**	**4**
**Joe Perry (ENG) (14)**	**4**
Graeme Dott (SCO) (19)	1

Last 16; Best of 7 frames
Robbie Williams (ENG)	1
**Joe Perry (ENG) (14)**	**4**

==== Section 6 ====
Last 128; Best of 7 frames
Lee Walker (WAL)	3
**Martin O'Donnell (ENG)**	**4**
Xiao Guodong (CHN) (22)	2
**Alexander Ursenbacher (SUI)**	**4**
**Jordan Brown (NIR)**	**4**
James Wattana (THA)	2
**Stuart Bingham (ENG) (11)**	**4**
Lu Ning (CHN)	3
**Ian Burns (ENG)**	**4**
Andy Lee (HKG)	0
**Scott Donaldson (SCO) (27)**	**4**
Alfie Burden (ENG)	1
**Jamie O'Neill (ENG)**	**4**
Sunny Akani (THA)	2
**Mark Allen (NIR) (6)**	**4**
Sam Craigie (ENG)	1

Last 64; Best of 7 frames
Martin O'Donnell (ENG)	3
**Alexander Ursenbacher (SUI)**	**4**
Jordan Brown (NIR)	1
**Stuart Bingham (ENG) (11)**	**4**
Ian Burns (ENG)	3
**Scott Donaldson (SCO) (27)**	**4**
Jamie O'Neill (ENG)	0
**Mark Allen (NIR) (6)**	**4**

Last 32; Best of 7 frames
**Alexander Ursenbacher (SUI)**	**4**
Stuart Bingham (ENG) (11)	2
Scott Donaldson (SCO) (27)	0
**Mark Allen (NIR) (6)**	**4**

Last 16; Best of 7 frames
**Alexander Ursenbacher (SUI)**	**4**
Mark Allen (NIR) (6)	3

==== Section 7 ====
Last 128; Best of 7 frames
**Shaun Murphy (ENG) (7)**	**4**
Fraser Patrick (SCO)	0
Dominic Dale (WAL)	2
**Luo Honghao (CHN)**	**4**
**Ricky Walden (ENG) (26)**	**4**
Alex Borg (MLT)	0
**Sam Baird (ENG)**	**4**
Nigel Bond (ENG)	2
**Barry Hawkins (ENG) (10)**	**4**
Eden Sharav (ISR)	3
**Michael Holt (ENG)**	**4**
Michael White (WAL)	2
**Jimmy Robertson (ENG) (23)**	**4**
Igor Figueiredo (BRA)	3
Fan Zhengyi (CHN)	2
**Fergal O'Brien (IRL)**	**4**

Last 64; Best of 7 frames
**Shaun Murphy (ENG) (7)**	**4**
Luo Honghao (CHN)	1
**Ricky Walden (ENG) (26)**	**4**
Sam Baird (ENG)	1
**Barry Hawkins (ENG) (10)**	**4**
Michael Holt (ENG)	3
Jimmy Robertson (ENG) (23)	3
**Fergal O'Brien (IRL)**	**4**

Last 32; Best of 7 frames
**Shaun Murphy (ENG) (7)**	**4**
Ricky Walden (ENG) (26)	3
**Barry Hawkins (ENG) (10)**	**4**
Fergal O'Brien (IRL)	2

Last 16; Best of 7 frames
**Shaun Murphy (ENG) (7)**	**4**
Barry Hawkins (ENG) (10)	2

==== Section 8 ====
Last 128; Best of 7 frames
Brandon Sargeant (ENG)	2
**Joe O'Connor (ENG)**	**4**
Gary Wilson (ENG) (18)	2
**Yuan Sijun (CHN)**	**4**
Jamie Clarke (WAL)	2
**Ben Woollaston (ENG)**	**4**
Ding Junhui (CHN) (15)	2
**David Lilley (ENG)**	**4**
John Astley (ENG)	1
**Stuart Carrington (ENG)**	**4**
**Zhou Yuelong (CHN) (31)**	**4**
David Grace (ENG)	0
Louis Heathcote (ENG)	2
**Lei Peifan (CHN)**	**4**
**Ronnie O'Sullivan (ENG) (2)**	**4**
Oliver Lines (ENG)	2

Last 64; Best of 7 frames
Joe O'Connor (ENG)	2
**Yuan Sijun (CHN)**	**4**
**Ben Woollaston (ENG)**	**4**
David Lilley (ENG)	2
**Stuart Carrington (ENG)**	**4**
Zhou Yuelong (CHN) (31)	0
Lei Peifan (CHN)	2
**Ronnie O'Sullivan (ENG) (2)**	**4**

Last 32; Best of 7 frames
**Yuan Sijun (CHN)**	**4**
Ben Woollaston (ENG)	3
Stuart Carrington (ENG)	1
**Ronnie O'Sullivan (ENG) (2)**	**4**

Last 16; Best of 7 frames
Yuan Sijun (CHN)	1
**Ronnie O'Sullivan (ENG) (2)**	**4**

=== Finals ===
**Quarter-finals**; Best of 9 frames
**Judd Trump (ENG) (1)**	**5**
Anthony Hamilton (ENG)	1
Mark Selby (ENG) (5)	4
**John Higgins (SCO) (4)**	**5**
**Joe Perry (ENG) (14)**	**5**
Alexander Ursenbacher (SUI)	3
Shaun Murphy (ENG) (7)	1
**Ronnie O'Sullivan (ENG) (2)**	**5**

**Semi-finals**; Best of 11 frames
**Judd Trump (ENG) (1)**	**6**
John Higgins (SCO) (5)	3
Joe Perry (ENG) (14)	1
**Ronnie O'Sullivan (ENG) (2)**	**6**

**Final**; Best of 17 frames
**Judd Trump (ENG) (1)**	**9**
Ronnie O'Sullivan (ENG) (2)	7

=== Final ===
Final: Best of 17 frames. Referee: Colin Humphries. Waterfront Hall, Belfast, Northern Ireland, 17 November 2019.
**Judd Trump (1)**; England	**9**–7	Ronnie O'Sullivan (2); England
Afternoon: **81**–6, **108**–1, 7–**126** (126), **123**–0 (123), 24–**89**, **113**–0, **88**–0, 5–**86**; Evening: 16–**75**, **123**–0 (106), **113**–0 (113), 0–**73**, 55–**76**, **129**–0 (124), 0–**135** (135), **84**–0
124	Highest break	**135**
**4**	Century breaks	2

== Century breaks ==
A total of 76 century breaks were made during the competition. The highest break was a maximum break scored by Bingham in the first frame of his opening round win over Lu Ning.

- 147 – Stuart Bingham
- 139, 132 – Zhang Anda
- 137, 114 – Mark Joyce
- 136, 134 – Matthew Stevens
- 136, 125, 124, 123, 122, 113, 111, 106, 106, 106, 105 – Judd Trump
- 136 – Zhao Xintong
- 135, 127, 126, 101 – Ronnie O'Sullivan
- 134 – Joe Perry
- 132 – Sam Baird
- 132 – Ken Doherty
- 130 – Matthew Selt
- 129, 127, 101 – Yan Bingtao
- 129, 119, 101 – Barry Hawkins
- 129 – Tian Pengfei
- 128, 113, 102 – Luca Brecel
- 126, 102 – Liang Wenbo
- 123 – Scott Donaldson
- 122, 104, 103 – Shaun Murphy
- 122 – Thor Chuan Leong
- 118, 103, 101, 101 – Mark Allen
- 118 – Yuan Sijun
- 117, 115, 112, 110 – John Higgins
- 116 – Ricky Walden
- 115, 109, 101 – Mark Selby
- 114, 101 – Robbie Williams
- 112 – Jack Lisowski
- 109 – Billy Joe Castle
- 109 – Chen Zifan
- 108 – Zhou Yuelong
- 107 – Anthony Hamilton
- 106 – Ali Carter
- 105 – Chang Bingyu
- 105 – Luo Honghao
- 105 – Mitchell Mann
- 104 – Stuart Carrington
- 103, 102 – Alexander Ursenbacher
- 102 – Ben Woollaston
- 101 – Michael White
- 100 – Graeme Dott
- 100 – Lei Peifan
- 100 – Hammad Miah
