= Vienna Snooker Open =

Snooker tournament

Tournament information
- Venue: 15 Reds Köö Wien Snooker Club
- Location: Vienna
- Country: Austria
- Established: 2010
- Organisation(s): ÖSBV
- Format: Pro–am
- Total prize fund: €10,000
- Final year: 2024
- Final champion: (Switzerland) Alexander Ursenbacher

The Vienna Snooker Open was a pro–am snooker tournament held in Vienna, Austria. The tournament was held for the first time in 2010, returned in 2012, and had been held annually until the 2024 edition where it is announced that the event is "taking a break" and was no longer held since then.

Mark King and Peter Ebdon have both won the tournament twice.

== Winners ==
Year	Winner	Runner-up	Final score	Season
2010	(England) Stephen Lee	(Belgium) Bjorn Haneveer	5–4	2010/11
2012	(England) Simon Bedford	(Wales) Jamie Jones	5–2	2011/12
2013	(England) Mark King	(England) Craig Steadman	5–0	2012/13
2014	(England) Mark King	(England) Nigel Bond	5–2	2013/14
2015	(England) Peter Ebdon	(England) Mark King	5–3	2014/15
2016	(England) Peter Ebdon	(England) Mark Davis	5–1	2015/16
2017	(England) David Grace	(England) Nigel Bond	5–2	2016/17
2018	(Cyprus) Michael Georgiou	(Scotland) Ross Muir	5–4	2017/18
2019	(England) Mark Joyce	(England) Mark King	5–4	2018/19
2023	(Austria) Florian Nüßle	(Germany) Lukas Kleckers	5–0	2022/23
2024	(Switzerland) Alexander Ursenbacher	(England) Craig Steadman	5–4	2023/24

== See also ==
- Wels Open
- Austrian Open
