= Austrian Open (snooker) =

Tournament information
- Venue: BRP-Hall
- Location: Wels
- Country: Austria
- Established: 1992
- Format: Pro–am
- Final year: 2012
- Final champion: (Wales) Mark Williams

The Austrian Open was a pro–am snooker tournament held in Wels, Austria. The tournament was first held in 1992. The last champion was Mark Williams.

== Winners ==
| Year | Winner | Runner-up | Final score | Season |
|---|---|---|---|---|
| 1992 | (Austria) Wolfgang Schramm | (Austria) Christian Innerhuber | 3–1 | 1992/93 |
| 1993 | (Germany) Mike Henson | (Thailand) Ku Anderson | (Note: Result of the final is not available.) | 1993/94 |
| 1994 | (Germany) Mike Henson | (Austria) Robert Burda | | 1994/95 |
| 1995 | (Netherlands) Stefan Mazrocis | (Germany) Mike Henson | 5–3 | 1995/96 |
| 1996 | (England) Darryn Walker | (Hungary) Zoltán Kojsza | 5–2 | 1996/97 |
| 1997 | (Scotland) Graeme Dott | (England) Matthew Couch | 7–6 | 1997/98 |
| 1999 | (England) Lee Richardson | (Switzerland) Darren Paris | 5–1 | 1999/00 |
| 2000 | (Finland) Robin Hull | (England) Matthew Couch | 5–1 | 2000/01 |
| 2001 | (Netherlands) Stefan Mazrocis | (England) Lee Richardson | 5–3 | 2001/02 |
| 2005 | (England) Mark King | (England) Lee Richardson | 5–2 | 2005/06 |
| 2006 | (England) Matthew Couch | (Germany) Patrick Einsle | 6–2 | 2006/07 |
| 2007 | (England) Tom Ford | (England) Stephen Lee | 5–4 | 2007/08 |
| 2008 | (Wales) Ryan Day | (England) Jamie Cope | 6–3 | 2008/09 |
| 2010 | (England) Judd Trump | (Australia) Neil Robertson | 6–4 | 2010/11 |
| 2012 | (Wales) Mark Williams | (England) Matthew Couch | 6–5 | 2012/13 |

== See also ==
- Wels Open
- Vienna Open
