= Wels Snooker Open =

Snooker tournament

Tournament information
- Venue: Paul Schopf Snooker Club
- Location: Wels
- Country: Austria
- Established: 2019
- Organisation(s): ÖSBV
- Format: Pro–am
- Total prize fund: €2,620
- Recent edition: 2026
- Current champion: (Austria) Florian Nüßle

The Wels Snooker Open is a pro–am snooker tournament held in Wels, Austria. The tournament was held for the first time in 2019.

Florian Nüßle is the all-time winner of the event, having won the tournament thrice.

== Winners ==
Year	Winner	Runner-up	Final score	Season
2019	(Croatia) Jan Jelenić	(Austria) Thomas Janzso	4–2	2019/20
2021	(Austria) Florian Nüßle	(Austria) Manuel Pomwenger	4–0	2021/22
2022	(Hungary) Bulcsú Révész	(Israel) Shachar Ruberg	4–1	2022/23
2023	(Israel) Shachar Ruberg	(Austria) Florian Nüßle	4–3	2023/24
2024	(Austria) Florian Nüßle	(Hungary) Nico Le Clercq	5–0	2024/25
2026	(Austria) Florian Nüßle	(Austria) Paul Schopf	4–0	2026/27

== See also ==
- Vienna Open
- Austrian Open, former pro-am event also held in Wels
