= 2021 WST Pro Series =

Tournament information
- Dates: 18 January – 21 March 2021
- Venue: Marshall Arena
- City: Milton Keynes
- Country: England
- Organisation: World Snooker Tour
- Format: Ranking event
- Total prize fund: £420,500
- Winner's share: £20,000
- Highest break: Gary Wilson (ENG) (147)

Final
- Champion: Mark Williams (WAL)
- Runner-up: Ali Carter (ENG)
- Score: Round-Robin

The 2021 WST Pro Series was a professional ranking snooker tournament, taking place from 18 January to 21 March 2021 at the Marshall Arena in Milton Keynes, England. The event featured 128 players, and was played over three stages of round-robin groups of eight players, with the Final Group winner as the tournament champion.

Seven-time World Champion, Stephen Hendry, was due to make his return to the professional snooker tour, having initially retired in 2012. However, he withdrew before the tournament began.

Gary Wilson made his third career maximum break in the second frame of his Group G match with Liam Highfield.

Mark Williams won the only edition of the event, winning the 23rd ranking title of his career on his 46th birthday, becoming the third oldest ranking event winner behind Welsh compatriots Doug Mountjoy who was 46 in 1989 and Ray Reardon who was 50 in 1982.

== Tournament format ==
There were 128 players taking part in the event. In the tournament's first stage players were divided into 16 groups of each eight players, with the top two players of each group advancing to the second group stage. The tournament draw was conducted on 8 January 2021.

The second group stage consisted of four groups, also of each eight players, with the top two players of each group advancing to the final group.

The winner of the final group were crowned as tournament champion.

All matches were played as best of three frames, and players were ranked, using the following criteria:

1. Matches won (Points scored)
2. Frame difference
3. Head-to-head match(es) (Note: If three or more players were tied, a mini group of head-to-head matches and frame differences were used.)
4. Highest break

=== Prize fund ===
The breakdown of prize money for the tournament is shown below.

First group stage

- Winner: £4,000
- Runner-up: £3,000
- 3rd Place: £2,500
- 4th Place: £2,000
- 5th Place: £1,500
- 6th Place: £1,000
- 7th Place: £500
- 8th Place: £0

Second group stage

- Winner: £10,000
- Runner-up: £7,500
- 3rd place: £5,000
- 4th place: £4,000
- 5th place: £3,000
- 6th place: £2,000
- 7th place: £1,500
- 8th place: £1,000

Final group stage

- Winner: £20,000
- Runner-up: £10,000
- 3rd place: £7,500
- 4th place: £5,000
- 5th place: £4,000
- 6th place: £3,000
- 7th place: £2,000
- 8th place: £1,000

- Tournament total: £420,500

== First group stage ==
The first group stage consisted of 16 groups, each containing eight players, with the top two of each group advancing to the second group stage.

=== Order of play ===
Date	Group
18 January	Group M
19 January	Group B
20 January	Group G
21 January	Group C
22 January	Group K
23 January	Group A
24 January	Group L
25 January	Group N

Date	Group
9 March	Group J
10 March	Group H
11 March	Group F
12 March	Group D
13 March	Group P
14 March	Group E
15 March	Group I
16 March	Group O

=== Group A ===
Group A was played on 23 January 2021. Shaun Murphy and Louis Heathcote qualified for the Second Group stage.

==== Matches ====
- Shaun Murphy 2–0 Brian Ochoiski
- Michael Holt 2–0 Fraser Patrick
- Alan McManus 2–0 Ken Doherty
- Louis Heathcote 2–1 Xu Si
- Shaun Murphy 2–1 Fraser Patrick
- Michael Holt 1–2 Ken Doherty
- Alan McManus 2–0 Xu Si
- Louis Heathcote 2–1 Brian Ochoiski
- Shaun Murphy 2–1 Ken Doherty
- Michael Holt 0–2 Xu Si
- Alan McManus 0–2 Louis Heathcote
- Fraser Patrick 0–2 Brian Ochoiski
- Shaun Murphy 2–1 Xu Si
- Michael Holt 2–1 Louis Heathcote
- Alan McManus 2–0 Brian Ochoiski
- Ken Doherty 2–0 Fraser Patrick
- Shaun Murphy 2–1 Louis Heathcote
- Michael Holt 1–2 Alan McManus
- Xu Si 2–1 Fraser Patrick
- Ken Doherty 1–2 Brian Ochoiski
- Shaun Murphy 2–1 Alan McManus
- Michael Holt 2–1 Brian Ochoiski
- Louis Heathcote 2–1 Fraser Patrick
- Xu Si 2–0 Ken Doherty
- Shaun Murphy 2–0 Michael Holt
- Alan McManus 2–1 Fraser Patrick
- Louis Heathcote 2–0 Ken Doherty
- Xu Si 2–0 Brian Ochoiski

==== Table ====
Pos.	Player	P	W	L	FW	FL	FD	Pts
1	Shaun Murphy (ENG)	7	7	0	14	5	+9	21
2	Louis Heathcote (ENG)	7	5	2	12	7	+5	15
3	Alan McManus (SCO)	7	5	2	11	6	+5	15
4	Xu Si (CHN)	7	4	3	10	7	+3	12
5	Michael Holt (ENG)	7	3	4	8	10	−2	9
6	Brian Ochoiski (FRA)	7	2	5	6	11	−5	6
7	Ken Doherty (IRL)	7	2	5	6	11	−5	6
8	Fraser Patrick (SCO)	7	0	7	4	14	−10	0

=== Group B ===
Group B was played on 19 January 2021. Kyren Wilson and Sunny Akani qualified for stage two.

==== Matches ====
- Kyren Wilson 2–1 Fan Zhengyi
- Li Hang 2–1 Dean Young
- Yuan Sijun 2–1 Kacper Filipiak
- Sunny Akani 2–1 Pang Junxu
- Kyren Wilson 2–0 Dean Young
- Li Hang 1–2 Kacper Filipiak
- Yuan Sijun 1–2 Pang Junxu
- Sunny Akani 2–0 Fan Zhengyi
- Kyren Wilson 2–0 Kacper Filipiak
- Li Hang 1–2 Pang Junxu
- Yuan Sijun 0–2 Sunny Akani
- Dean Young 0–2 Fan Zhengyi
- Kyren Wilson 2–0 Pang Junxu
- Li Hang 0–2 Sunny Akani
- Yuan Sijun 2–0 Fan Zhengyi
- Kacper Filipiak 2–1 Dean Young
- Kyren Wilson 2–0 Sunny Akani
- Li Hang 2–0 Yuan Sijun
- Pang Junxu 2–0 Dean Young
- Kacper Filipiak 1–2 Fan Zhengyi
- Kyren Wilson 1–2 Yuan Sijun
- Li Hang 2–1 Fan Zhengyi
- Sunny Akani 2–0 Dean Young
- Pang Junxu 2–0 Kacper Filipiak
- Kyren Wilson 1–2 Li Hang
- Yuan Sijun 2–0 Dean Young
- Sunny Akani 0–2 Kacper Filipiak
- Pang Junxu 2–0 Fan Zhengyi

==== Table ====
Pos.	Player	P	W	L	FW	FL	FD	Pts
1	Kyren Wilson (ENG)	7	5	2	12	5	+7	15
2	Sunny Akani (THA)	7	5	2	10	5	+5	15
3	Pang Junxu (CHN)	7	5	2	11	6	+5	15
4	Li Hang (CHN)	7	4	3	10	9	+1	12
5	Yuan Sijun (CHN)	7	4	3	9	8	+1	12
6	Kacper Filipiak (POL)	7	3	4	8	10	−2	9
7	Fan Zhengyi (CHN)	7	2	5	6	11	−5	6
8	Dean Young (SCO)	7	0	7	2	14	−12	0

Aaron Hill was initially due to take part in Group B, but he withdrew and was replaced by Dean Young.

=== Group C ===
Group C was played on 21 January 2021. Stuart Bingham and Sam Craigie qualified for the Second Group stage.

==== Matches ====
- Stuart Bingham 2–0 Jamie Curtis-Barrett
- Scott Donaldson 2–1 Billy Castle
- Sam Craigie 2–0 Ashley Carty
- Chris Wakelin 1–2 Jamie Clarke
- Stuart Bingham 2–0 Billy Castle
- Scott Donaldson 0–2 Ashley Carty
- Sam Craigie 2–0 Jamie Clarke
- Chris Wakelin 2–1 Jamie Curtis-Barrett
- Stuart Bingham 2–0 Ashley Carty
- Scott Donaldson 1–2 Jamie Clarke
- Sam Craigie 2–1 Chris Wakelin
- Billy Castle 2–1 Jamie Curtis-Barrett
- Stuart Bingham 2–0 Jamie Clarke
- Scott Donaldson 0–2 Chris Wakelin
- Sam Craigie 2–0 Jamie Curtis-Barrett
- Ashley Carty 0–2 Billy Castle
- Stuart Bingham 2–0 Chris Wakelin
- Scott Donaldson 2–0 Sam Craigie
- Jamie Clarke 2–0 Billy Castle
- Ashley Carty 2–1 Jamie Curtis-Barrett
- Stuart Bingham 2–0 Sam Craigie
- Scott Donaldson 2–0 Jamie Curtis-Barrett
- Chris Wakelin 2–1 Billy Castle
- Jamie Clarke 1–2 Ashley Carty
- Stuart Bingham 2–0 Scott Donaldson
- Sam Craigie 2–0 Billy Castle
- Chris Wakelin 2–1 Ashley Carty
- Jamie Clarke 2–0 Jamie Curtis-Barrett

==== Table ====
Pos.	Player	P	W	L	FW	FL	FD	Pts
1	Stuart Bingham (ENG)	7	7	0	14	0	+14	21
2	Sam Craigie (ENG)	7	5	2	10	5	+5	15
3	Jamie Clarke (WAL)	7	4	3	9	8	+1	12
4	Chris Wakelin (ENG)	7	4	3	10	9	+1	12
5	Scott Donaldson (SCO)	7	3	4	7	9	−2	9
6	Ashley Carty (ENG)	7	3	4	7	10	−3	9
7	Billy Castle (ENG)	7	2	5	6	11	−5	6
8	Jamie Curtis-Barrett (ENG)	7	0	7	3	14	−11	0

=== Group D ===
Group D was played on 12 March 2021. Barry Hawkins and Ricky Walden qualified for the Second Group stage.

==== Matches ====
- Barry Hawkins 2–0 Paul Davison
- Ricky Walden 2–1 Farakh Ajaib
- Jimmy Robertson 2–0 Duane Jones
- Alexander Ursenbacher 2–1 Gerard Greene
- Barry Hawkins 2–0 Farakh Ajaib
- Ricky Walden 2–1 Duane Jones
- Jimmy Robertson 0–2 Gerard Greene
- Alexander Ursenbacher 2–0 Paul Davison
- Barry Hawkins 2–0 Duane Jones
- Ricky Walden 2–0 Gerard Greene
- Jimmy Robertson 2–0 Alexander Ursenbacher
- Farakh Ajaib 2–1 Paul Davison
- Barry Hawkins 2–1 Gerard Greene
- Ricky Walden 2–1 Alexander Ursenbacher
- Jimmy Robertson 1–2 Paul Davison
- Duane Jones 1–2 Farakh Ajaib
- Barry Hawkins 2–1 Alexander Ursenbacher
- Ricky Walden 2–1 Jimmy Robertson
- Gerard Greene 2–1 Farakh Ajaib
- Duane Jones 2–0 Paul Davison
- Barry Hawkins 0–2 Jimmy Robertson
- Ricky Walden 2–0 Paul Davison
- Alexander Ursenbacher 2–0 Farakh Ajaib
- Gerard Greene 2–1 Duane Jones
- Barry Hawkins 2–1 Ricky Walden
- Jimmy Robertson 2–0 Farakh Ajaib
- Alexander Ursenbacher 0–2 Duane Jones
- Gerard Greene 1–2 Paul Davison

==== Table ====
Pos.	Player	P	W	L	FW	FL	FD	Pts
1	Barry Hawkins (ENG)	7	6	1	12	5	+7	18
2	Ricky Walden (ENG)	7	6	1	13	6	+7	18
3	Jimmy Robertson (ENG)	7	4	3	10	6	+4	12
4	Alexander Ursenbacher (SUI)	7	3	4	8	9	−1	9
5	Gerard Greene (NIR)	7	3	4	9	10	−1	9
6	Duane Jones (WAL)	7	2	5	7	10	−3	6
7	Farakh Ajaib (PAK)	7	2	5	6	12	−6	6
8	Paul Davison (ENG)	7	2	5	5	12	−7	6

=== Group E ===
Group E was played on 14 March 2021. Mark Selby and Stuart Carrington qualified for the Second Group stage.

==== Matches ====
- Mark Selby 2–0 Daniel Womersley
- Matthew Selt 1–2 Lukas Kleckers
- Joe O'Connor 0–2 Soheil Vahedi
- Stuart Carrington 2–0 Eden Sharav
- Mark Selby 2–1 Lukas Kleckers
- Matthew Selt 1–2 Soheil Vahedi
- Joe O'Connor 0–2 Eden Sharav
- Stuart Carrington 2–0 Daniel Womersley
- Mark Selby 0–2 Soheil Vahedi
- Matthew Selt 2–0 Eden Sharav
- Joe O'Connor 0–2 Stuart Carrington
- Lukas Kleckers 2–0 Daniel Womersley
- Mark Selby 2–0 Eden Sharav
- Matthew Selt 2–1 Stuart Carrington
- Joe O'Connor 2–0 Daniel Womersley
- Soheil Vahedi 2–1 Lukas Kleckers
- Mark Selby 2–0 Stuart Carrington
- Matthew Selt 2–0 Joe O'Connor
- Eden Sharav 2–0 Lukas Kleckers
- Soheil Vahedi 1–2 Daniel Womersley
- Mark Selby 2–0 Joe O'Connor
- Matthew Selt 2–0 Daniel Womersley
- Stuart Carrington 2–1 Lukas Kleckers
- Eden Sharav 1–2 Soheil Vahedi
- Mark Selby 2–1 Matthew Selt
- Joe O'Connor 2–0 Lukas Kleckers
- Stuart Carrington 2–0 Soheil Vahedi
- Eden Sharav 1–2 Daniel Womersley

==== Table ====
Pos.	Player	P	W	L	FW	FL	FD	Pts
1	Mark Selby (ENG)	7	6	1	12	4	+8	18
2	Stuart Carrington (ENG)	7	5	2	11	5	+6	15
3	Soheil Vahedi (IRN)	7	5	2	11	7	+4	15
4	Matthew Selt (ENG)	7	4	3	11	7	+4	12
5	Eden Sharav (ISR)	7	2	5	6	10	−4	6
6	Lukas Kleckers (GER)	7	2	5	7	11	−4	6
7	Joe O'Connor (ENG)	7	2	5	4	10	−6	6
8	Daniel Womersley (ENG)	7	2	5	4	12	−8	6

=== Group F ===
Group F was played on 11 March 2021. Ben Woollaston and Fergal O'Brien qualified for the Second Group stage.

==== Matches ====
- Robbie McGuigan 0–2 Fergal O'Brien
- Ben Woollaston 2–0 Riley Parsons
- Noppon Saengkham 2–0 Jordan Brown
- David Grace 0–2 Igor Figueiredo
- Robbie McGuigan 0–2 Riley Parsons
- Ben Woollaston 2–0 Jordan Brown
- Noppon Saengkham 2–0 Igor Figueiredo
- David Grace 2–1 Fergal O'Brien
- Robbie McGuigan 0–2 Jordan Brown
- Ben Woollaston 1–2 Igor Figueiredo
- Noppon Saengkham 2–1 David Grace
- Riley Parsons 2–1 Fergal O'Brien
- Robbie McGuigan 0–2 Igor Figueiredo
- Ben Woollaston 2–0 David Grace
- Noppon Saengkham 1–2 Fergal O'Brien
- Jordan Brown 2–0 Riley Parsons
- Robbie McGuigan 2–0 David Grace
- Ben Woollaston 2–0 Noppon Saengkham
- Igor Figueiredo 1–2 Riley Parsons
- Jordan Brown 1–2 Fergal O'Brien
- Robbie McGuigan 1–2 Noppon Saengkham
- Ben Woollaston 1–2 Fergal O'Brien
- David Grace 2–1 Riley Parsons
- Igor Figueiredo 2–1 Jordan Brown
- Robbie McGuigan 1–2 Ben Woollaston
- Noppon Saengkham 1–2 Riley Parsons
- David Grace 0–2 Jordan Brown
- Igor Figueiredo 0–2 Fergal O'Brien

==== Table ====
Pos.	Player	P	W	L	FW	FL	FD	Pts
1	Ben Woollaston (ENG)	7	5	2	12	5	+7	15
2	Fergal O'Brien (IRL)	7	5	2	12	7	+5	15
3	Noppon Saengkham (THA)	7	4	3	10	8	+2	12
4	Igor Figueiredo (BRA)	7	4	3	9	8	+1	12
5	Riley Parsons (ENG)	7	4	3	9	9	0	12
6	Jordan Brown (NIR)	7	3	4	8	8	0	9
7	David Grace (ENG)	7	2	5	5	12	−7	6
8	Robbie McGuigan (NIR)	7	1	6	4	12	−8	3

Mark Allen was initially due to take part in Group F, but he withdrew and was replaced by Robbie McGuigan.

=== Group G ===
Group G was played on 20 January 2021. Lu Ning and Martin O'Donnell qualified for the Second Group stage.

==== Matches ====
- Gary Wilson 0–2 John Astley
- Lu Ning 2–1 Rory McLeod
- Martin O'Donnell 2–1 Zhao Jianbo
- Liam Highfield 0–2 Jamie O'Neill
- Gary Wilson 1–2 Rory McLeod
- Lu Ning 0–2 Zhao Jianbo
- Martin O'Donnell 2–0 Jamie O'Neill
- Liam Highfield 2–0 John Astley
- Gary Wilson 2–1 Zhao Jianbo
- Lu Ning 2–1 Jamie O'Neill
- Martin O'Donnell 2–0 Liam Highfield
- Rory McLeod 1–2 John Astley
- Gary Wilson 2–1 Jamie O'Neill
- Lu Ning 2–0 Liam Highfield
- Martin O'Donnell 2–0 John Astley
- Zhao Jianbo 2–1 Rory McLeod
- Gary Wilson 1–2 Liam Highfield
- Lu Ning 2–0 Martin O'Donnell
- Jamie O'Neill 2–1 Rory McLeod
- Zhao Jianbo 0–2 John Astley
- Gary Wilson 2–1 Martin O'Donnell
- Lu Ning 2–0 John Astley
- Liam Highfield 2–0 Rory McLeod
- Jamie O'Neill 2–0 Zhao Jianbo
- Gary Wilson 2–1 Lu Ning
- Martin O'Donnell 2–0 Rory McLeod
- Liam Highfield 2–1 Zhao Jianbo
- Jamie O'Neill 2–0 John Astley

==== Table ====
Pos.	Player	P	W	L	FW	FL	FD	Pts
1	Martin O'Donnell (ENG)	7	5	2	11	5	+6	15
2	Lu Ning (CHN)	7	5	2	11	6	+5	15
3	Jamie O'Neill (ENG)	7	4	3	10	7	+3	12
4	Liam Highfield (ENG)	7	4	3	8	8	0	12
5	Gary Wilson (ENG)	7	4	3	10	10	0	12
6	John Astley (ENG)	7	3	4	6	9	−3	9
7	Zhao Jianbo (CHN)	7	2	5	7	11	−4	6
8	Rory McLeod (JAM)	7	1	6	6	13	−7	3

Stephen Hendry was initially due to take part in Group G, but he withdrew and was replaced by John Astley.

=== Group H ===
Group H was played on 10 March 2021. Ali Carter and Mark Davis qualified for the second Group stage.

==== Matches ====
- Hamim Hussain 0–2 Kuldesh Johal
- Ali Carter 2–0 Dylan Emery
- Mark Davis 2–0 Simon Lichtenberg
- Tian Pengfei 1–2 Chang Bingyu
- Hamim Hussain 1–2 Dylan Emery
- Ali Carter 2–0 Simon Lichtenberg
- Mark Davis 2–0 Chang Bingyu
- Tian Pengfei 2–1 Kuldesh Johal
- Hamim Hussain 0–2 Simon Lichtenberg
- Ali Carter 2–0 Chang Bingyu
- Mark Davis 0–2 Tian Pengfei
- Dylan Emery 2–1 Kuldesh Johal
- Hamim Hussain 1–2 Chang Bingyu
- Ali Carter 2–0 Tian Pengfei
- Mark Davis 0–2 Kuldesh Johal
- Simon Lichtenberg 2–1 Dylan Emery
- Hamim Hussain 0–2 Tian Pengfei
- Ali Carter 0–2 Mark Davis
- Chang Bingyu 2–1 Dylan Emery
- Simon Lichtenberg 2–0 Kuldesh Johal
- Hamim Hussain 0–2 Mark Davis
- Ali Carter 2–0 Kuldesh Johal
- Tian Pengfei 1–2 Dylan Emery
- Chang Bingyu 1–2 Simon Lichtenberg
- Hamim Hussain 1–2 Ali Carter
- Mark Davis 2–0 Dylan Emery
- Tian Pengfei 0–2 Simon Lichtenberg
- Chang Bingyu 2–0 Kuldesh Johal

==== Table ====
Pos.	Player	P	W	L	FW	FL	FD	Pts
1	Ali Carter (ENG)	7	6	1	12	3	+9	18
2	Mark Davis (ENG)	7	5	2	10	4	+6	15
3	Simon Lichtenberg (GER)	7	5	2	10	6	+4	15
4	Chang Bingyu (CHN)	7	4	3	9	9	0	12
5	Tian Pengfei (CHN)	7	3	4	8	9	−1	9
6	Dylan Emery (WAL)	7	3	4	8	11	−3	9
7	Kuldesh Johal (ENG)	7	2	5	6	10	−4	6
8	Hamim Hussain (ENG)	7	0	7	3	14	−11	0

Yan Bingtao and Amine Amiri were initially due to take part in Group H, but they withdrew and were replaced by Hamim Hussain and Dylan Emery respectively.

=== Group I ===
Group I was played on 15 March 2021. Ben Hancorn and Lyu Haotian qualified for the Second Group stage.

==== Matches ====
- Ronnie O'Sullivan 2–0 Jamie Wilson
- Tom Ford 2–1 Ben Hancorn
- Lyu Haotian 2–1 David Lilley
- Mark Joyce 2–0 Chen Zifan
- Ronnie O'Sullivan 1–2 Ben Hancorn
- Tom Ford 1–2 David Lilley
- Lyu Haotian 2–0 Chen Zifan
- Mark Joyce 0–2 Jamie Wilson
- Ronnie O'Sullivan 0–2 David Lilley
- Tom Ford 1–2 Chen Zifan
- Lyu Haotian 2–0 Mark Joyce
- Ben Hancorn 2–1 Jamie Wilson
- Ronnie O'Sullivan 1–2 Chen Zifan
- Tom Ford 0–2 Mark Joyce
- Lyu Haotian 2–0 Jamie Wilson
- David Lilley 0–2 Ben Hancorn
- Ronnie O'Sullivan 2–1 Mark Joyce
- Tom Ford 1–2 Lyu Haotian
- Chen Zifan 1–2 Ben Hancorn
- David Lilley 2–0 Jamie Wilson
- Ronnie O'Sullivan 0–2 Lyu Haotian
- Tom Ford 2–1 Jamie Wilson
- Mark Joyce 0–2 Ben Hancorn
- Chen Zifan 2–1 David Lilley
- Ronnie O'Sullivan 0–2 Tom Ford
- Lyu Haotian 0–2 Ben Hancorn
- Mark Joyce 2–1 David Lilley
- Chen Zifan 0–2 Jamie Wilson
- Note: Ronnie O'Sullivan was docked a frame for arriving late to his match with Mark Joyce, so trailing 0–1 before the match even started. O'Sullivan won the next two frames in 14 minutes to win 2–1.

==== Table ====
Pos.	Player	P	W	L	FW	FL	FD	Pts
1	Ben Hancorn (ENG)	7	6	1	13	5	+8	18
2	Lyu Haotian (CHN)	7	6	1	12	4	+8	18
3	David Lilley (ENG)	7	3	4	9	9	0	9
4	Tom Ford (ENG)	7	3	4	9	10	−1	9
5	Mark Joyce (ENG)	7	3	4	7	8	−2	9
6	Chen Zifan (CHN)	7	3	4	7	11	−4	9
7	Jamie Wilson (ENG)	7	2	5	6	10	−4	6
8	Ronnie O'Sullivan (ENG)	7	2	5	6	11	−5	6

=== Group J ===
Group J was played on 9 March 2021. Oliver Lines and James Cahill qualified for the Second Group stage.

==== Matches ====
- David Gilbert 2–1 Iulian Boiko
- Martin Gould 1–2 Oliver Lines
- Elliot Slessor 2–1 Peter Lines
- Ian Burns 1–2 James Cahill
- David Gilbert 1–2 Oliver Lines
- Martin Gould 1–2 Peter Lines
- Elliot Slessor 1–2 James Cahill
- Ian Burns 0–2 Iulian Boiko
- David Gilbert 2–0 Peter Lines
- Martin Gould 0–2 James Cahill
- Elliot Slessor 2–1 Ian Burns
- Oliver Lines 2–0 Iulian Boiko
- David Gilbert 1–2 James Cahill
- Martin Gould 0–2 Ian Burns
- Elliot Slessor 2–1 Iulian Boiko
- Peter Lines 0–2 Oliver Lines
- David Gilbert 0–2 Ian Burns
- Martin Gould 0–2 Elliot Slessor
- James Cahill 0–2 Oliver Lines
- Peter Lines 2–0 Iulian Boiko
- David Gilbert 2–0 Elliot Slessor
- Martin Gould 2–0 Iulian Boiko
- Ian Burns 2–0 Oliver Lines
- James Cahill 2–1 Peter Lines
- David Gilbert 2–1 Martin Gould
- Elliot Slessor 0–2 Oliver Lines
- Ian Burns 2–1 Peter Lines
- James Cahill 2–1 Iulian Boiko

==== Table ====
Pos.	Player	P	W	L	FW	FL	FD	Pts
1	Oliver Lines (ENG)	7	6	1	12	4	+8	18
2	James Cahill (ENG)	7	6	1	12	7	+5	18
3	Ian Burns (ENG)	7	4	3	10	7	+3	12
4	David Gilbert (ENG)	7	4	3	10	8	+2	12
5	Elliot Slessor (ENG)	7	4	3	9	9	0	12
6	Peter Lines (ENG)	7	2	5	7	11	−4	6
7	Martin Gould (ENG)	7	1	6	5	12	−7	3
8	Iulian Boiko (UKR)	7	1	6	5	12	−7	3

=== Group K ===
Group K was played on 22 January 2021. Zhao Xintong and Dominic Dale qualified for the Second Group stage.

==== Matches ====
- Anthony McGill 2–1 Lee Walker
- Zhao Xintong 1–2 Peter Devlin
- Mark King 0–2 Si Jiahui
- Dominic Dale 2–1 Andy Hicks
- Anthony McGill 0–2 Peter Devlin
- Zhao Xintong 2–0 Si Jiahui
- Mark King 0–2 Andy Hicks
- Dominic Dale 2–0 Lee Walker
- Anthony McGill 0–2 Si Jiahui
- Zhao Xintong 1–2 Andy Hicks
- Mark King 2–1 Dominic Dale
- Peter Devlin 1–2 Lee Walker
- Anthony McGill 2–0 Andy Hicks
- Zhao Xintong 2–0 Dominic Dale
- Mark King 2–0 Lee Walker
- Si Jiahui 2–0 Peter Devlin
- Anthony McGill 2–1 Dominic Dale
- Zhao Xintong 2–0 Mark King
- Andy Hicks 2–0 Peter Devlin
- Si Jiahui 0–2 Lee Walker
- Anthony McGill 1–2 Mark King
- Zhao Xintong 2–1 Lee Walker
- Dominic Dale 2–0 Peter Devlin
- Andy Hicks 2–1 Si Jiahui
- Anthony McGill 0–2 Zhao Xintong
- Mark King 0–2 Peter Devlin
- Dominic Dale 2–1 Si Jiahui
- Andy Hicks 1–2 Lee Walker

==== Table ====
Pos.	Player	P	W	L	FW	FL	FD	Pts
1	Zhao Xintong (CHN)	7	5	2	12	5	+7	15
2	Dominic Dale (WAL)	7	4	3	10	8	+2	12
3	Andy Hicks (ENG)	7	4	3	10	8	+2	12
4	Si Jiahui (CHN)	7	3	4	8	8	0	9
5	Lee Walker (WAL)	7	3	4	8	10	−2	9
6	Peter Devlin (ENG)	7	3	4	7	9	−2	9
7	Anthony McGill (SCO)	7	3	4	7	10	−3	9
8	Mark King (ENG)	7	3	4	6	10	−4	9

=== Group L ===
Group L was played on 24 January 2021. Luo Honghao and Zhou Yuelong qualified for the Second Group stage.

==== Matches ====
- Thepchaiya Un-Nooh 2–0 Leo Fernandez
- Zhou Yuelong 2–0 Ashley Hugill
- Anthony Hamilton 2–1 Lei be Peifan
- Luo Honghao 2–1 Mitchell Mann
- Thepchaiya Un-Nooh 2–0 Ashley Hugill
- Zhou Yuelong 2–0 Lei Peifan
- Anthofny Hamilton 2–1 Mitchell Mann
- Luo Honghao 2–1 Leo Fernandez
- Thepchaiya Un-Nooh 0–2 Lei Peifan
- Zhou Yuelong 0–2 Mitchell Mann
- Anthony Hamilton 0–2 Luo Honghao
- Ashley Hugill 1–2 Leo Fernandez
- Thepchaiya Un-Nooh 1–2 Mitchell Mann
- Zhou Yuelong 0–2 Luo Honghao
- Anthony Hamilton 0–2 Leo Fernandez
- Lei Peifan 2–1 Ashley Hugill
- Thepchaiya Un-Nooh 1–2 Luo Honghao
- Zhou Yuelong 2–1 Anthony Hamilton
- Mitchell Mann 0–2 Ashley Hugill
- Lei Peifan 2–1 Leo Fernandez
- Thepchaiya Un-Nooh 0–2 Anthony Hamilton
- Zhou Yuelong 2–0 Leo Fernandez
- Luo Honghao 0–2 Ashley Hugill
- Mitchell Mann 2–0 Lei Peifan
- Thepchaiya Un-Nooh 0–2 Zhou Yuelong
- Anthony Hamilton 0–2 Ashley Hugill
- Luo Honghao 2–0 Lei Peifan
- Mitchell Mann 1–2 Leo Fernandez

==== Table ====
Pos.	Player	P	W	L	FW	FL	FD	Pts
1	Luo Honghao (CHN)	7	6	1	12	5	+7	18
2	Zhou Yuelong (CHN)	7	5	2	10	5	+5	15
3	Ashley Hugill (ENG)	7	3	4	8	8	0	9
4	Mitchell Mann (ENG)	7	3	4	9	9	0	9
5	Leo Fernandez (IRL)	7	3	4	8	10	−2	9
6	Anthony Hamilton (ENG)	7	3	4	7	10	−3	9
7	Lei Peifan (CHN)	7	3	4	7	10	−3	9
8	Thepchaiya Un-Nooh (THA)	7	2	5	6	10	−4	6

=== Group M ===
Group M was played on 18 January 2021. Joe Perry and Xiao Guodong qualified for the Second Group stage.

==== Matches ====
- Joe Perry 2–0 Haydon Pinhey
- Xiao Guodong 2–0 Allan Taylor
- Matthew Stevens 2–0 Rod Lawler
- Daniel Wells 2–1 Jak Jones
- Joe Perry 2–0 Allan Taylor
- Xiao Guodong 2–0 Rod Lawler
- Matthew Stevens 2–0 Jak Jones
- Daniel Wells 2–0 Haydon Pinhey
- Joe Perry 1–2 Rod Lawler
- Xiao Guodong 2–0 Jak Jones
- Matthew Stevens 2–0 Daniel Wells
- Allan Taylor 2–0 Haydon Pinhey
- Joe Perry 2–1 Jak Jones
- Xiao Guodong 1–2 Daniel Wells
- Matthew Stevens 2–0 Haydon Pinhey
- Rod Lawler 0–2 Allan Taylor
- Joe Perry 2–1 Daniel Wells
- Xiao Guodong 2–0 Matthew Stevens
- Jak Jones 2–0 Allan Taylor
- Rod Lawler 2–0 Haydon Pinhey
- Joe Perry 2–1 Matthew Stevens
- Xiao Guodong 2–0 Haydon Pinhey
- Daniel Wells 2–0 Allan Taylor
- Jak Jones 2–1 Rod Lawler
- Joe Perry 2–1 Xiao Guodong
- Matthew Stevens 1–2 Allan Taylor
- Daniel Wells 0–2 Rod Lawler
- Jak Jones 2–0 Haydon Pinhey

==== Table ====
Pos.	Player	P	W	L	FW	FL	FD	Pts
1	Joe Perry (ENG)	7	6	1	13	6	+7	18
2	Xiao Guodong (CHN)	7	5	2	12	4	+8	15
3	Matthew Stevens (WAL)	7	4	3	10	6	+4	12
4	Daniel Wells (WAL)	7	4	3	9	8	+1	12
5	Jak Jones (WAL)	7	3	4	8	9	−1	9
6	Rod Lawler (ENG)	7	3	4	7	9	−2	9
7	Allan Taylor (ENG)	7	3	4	6	9	−3	9
8	Haydon Pinhey (ENG)	7	0	7	0	14	−14	0

=== Group N ===
Group N was played on 25 January 2021. Jack Lisowski and Luca Brecel qualified for the Second Group stage.

==== Matches ====
- Jack Lisowski 2–1 Michael White
- Graeme Dott 0–2 Zak Surety
- Luca Brecel 1–2 Brandon Sargeant
- Andrew Higginson 1–2 Jackson Page
- Jack Lisowski 0–2 Zak Surety
- Graeme Dott 0–2 Brandon Sargeant
- Luca Brecel 2–1 Jackson Page
- Andrew Higginson 2–1 Michael White
- Jack Lisowski 2–1 Brandon Sargeant
- Graeme Dott 0–2 Jackson Page
- Luca Brecel 1–2 Andrew Higginson
- Zak Surety 2–1 Michael White
- Jack Lisowski 2–1 Jackson Page
- Graeme Dott 0–2 Andrew Higginson
- Luca Brecel 2–1 Michael White
- Brandon Sargeant 1–2 Zak Surety
- Jack Lisowski 2–0 Andrew Higginson
- Graeme Dott 1–2 Luca Brecel
- Jackson Page 2–1 Zak Surety
- Brandon Sargeant 0–2 Michael White
- Jack Lisowski 1–2 Luca Brecel
- Graeme Dott 0–2 Michael White
- Andrew Higginson 2–1 Zak Surety
- Jackson Page 2–1 Brandon Sargeant
- Jack Lisowski 2–0 Graeme Dott
- Luca Brecel 2–0 Zak Surety
- Andrew Higginson 2–0 Brandon Sargeant
- Jackson Page 1–2 Michael White

==== Table ====
Pos.	Player	P	W	L	FW	FL	FD	Pts
1	Jack Lisowski (ENG)	7	5	2	11	7	+4	15
2	Luca Brecel (BEL)	7	5	2	12	8	+4	15
3	Andrew Higginson (ENG)	7	5	2	11	7	+4	15
4	Jackson Page (WAL)	7	4	3	11	9	+2	12
5	Zak Surety (ENG)	7	4	3	10	8	+2	12
6	Michael White (WAL)	7	3	4	10	9	+1	9
7	Brandon Sargeant (ENG)	7	2	5	7	11	−4	6
8	Graeme Dott (SCO)	7	0	7	1	14	−13	0

=== Group O ===
Group O was played on 16 March 2021. Judd Trump and Ryan Day qualified for the Second Group stage.

==== Matches ====
- Judd Trump 2–0 Sean Maddocks
- Hossein Vafaei 1–2 Steven Hallworth
- Ryan Day 1–2 Jimmy White
- Jamie Jones 2–0 Barry Pinches
- Judd Trump 2–1 Steven Hallworth
- Hossein Vafaei 1–2 Jimmy White
- Ryan Day 2–0 Barry Pinches
- Jamie Jones 2–1 Sean Maddocks
- Judd Trump 2–1 Jimmy White
- Hossein Vafaei 1–2 Barry Pinches
- Ryan Day 2–0 Jamie Jones
- Steven Hallworth 2–1 Sean Maddocks
- Judd Trump 2–0 Barry Pinches
- Hossein Vafaei 1–2 Jamie Jones
- Ryan Day 2–0 Sean Maddocks
- Jimmy White 1–2 Steven Hallworth
- Judd Trump 2–0 Jamie Jones
- Hossein Vafaei 0–2 Ryan Day
- Barry Pinches 0–2 Steven Hallworth
- Jimmy White 2–1 Sean Maddocks
- Judd Trump 2–0 Ryan Day
- Hossein Vafaei 2–0 Sean Maddocks
- Jamie Jones 2–0 Steven Hallworth
- Barry Pinches 1–2 Jimmy White
- Judd Trump 0–2 Hossein Vafaei
- Ryan Day 2–0 Steven Hallworth
- Jamie Jones 2–1 Jimmy White
- Barry Pinches 2–0 Sean Maddocks

==== Table ====
Pos.	Player	P	W	L	FW	FL	FD	Pts
1	Judd Trump (ENG)	7	6	1	12	4	+8	18
2	Ryan Day (WAL)	7	5	2	11	4	+7	15
3	Jamie Jones (WAL)	7	5	2	10	7	+3	15
4	Jimmy White (ENG)	7	4	3	11	10	+1	12
5	Steven Hallworth (ENG)	7	4	3	9	9	0	12
6	Hossein Vafaei (IRN)	7	2	5	8	10	−2	6
7	Barry Pinches (ENG)	7	2	5	5	11	−6	6
8	Sean Maddocks (ENG)	7	0	7	3	14	−11	0

=== Group P ===
Group P was played on 13 March 2021. Mark Williams and Robert Milkins qualified for the Second Group stage.

==== Matches ====
- Mark Williams 2–0 Oliver Brown
- Alex Clenshaw 0–2 Florian Nüßle
- Robert Milkins 2–1 Gao Yang
- Nigel Bond 2–1 Robbie Williams
- Mark Williams 2–0 Florian Nüßle
- Alex Clenshaw 1–2 Gao Yang
- Robert Milkins 2–0 Robbie Williams
- Nigel Bond 1–2 Oliver Brown
- Mark Williams 2–0 Gao Yang
- Alex Clenshaw 1–2 Robbie Williams
- Robert Milkins 0–2 Nigel Bond
- Florian Nüßle 0–2 Oliver Brown
- Mark Williams 2–0 Robbie Williams
- Alex Clenshaw 2–0 Nigel Bond
- Robert Milkins 2–0 Oliver Brown
- Gao Yang 2–1 Florian Nüßle
- Mark Williams 2–0 Nigel Bond
- Alex Clenshaw 0–2 Robert Milkins
- Robbie Williams 2–1 Florian Nüßle
- Gao Yang 0–2 Oliver Brown
- Mark Williams 0–2 Robert Milkins
- Alex Clenshaw 1–2 Oliver Brown
- Nigel Bond 2–0 Florian Nüßle
- Robbie Williams 2–0 Gao Yang
- Mark Williams 2–0 Alex Clenshaw
- Robert Milkins 2–0 Florian Nüßle
- Nigel Bond 2–0 Gao Yang
- Robbie Williams 2–0 Oliver Brown

==== Table ====
Pos.	Player	P	W	L	FW	FL	FD	Pts
1	Mark Williams (WAL)	7	6	1	12	2	+10	18
2	Robert Milkins (ENG)	7	6	1	12	3	+9	18
3	Nigel Bond (ENG)	7	4	3	9	7	+2	12
4	Robbie Williams (ENG)	7	4	3	9	8	+1	12
5	Oliver Brown (ENG)	7	4	3	8	8	0	12
6	Gao Yang (CHN)	7	2	5	5	12	−7	6
7	Alex Clenshaw (ENG)	7	1	6	5	12	−7	3
8	Florian Nüßle (AUT)	7	1	6	4	12	−8	3

Kurt Maflin and Alex Borg were initially due to take part in Group P, but they withdrew and were replaced by Alex Clenshaw and Florian Nüßle respectively.

== Second group stage ==
The second group stage consisted of four groups, each containing eight players, with the top two of each group advancing to the final group.

=== Order of play ===
Date	Group
17 March	Group 1
18 March	Group 2
19 March	Group 3
20 March	Group 4

=== Group 1 ===
Group 1 was played on 17 March 2021. Ali Carter and Mark Williams qualified for the Final Group Stage.

==== Matches ====
- Ben Hancorn 1–2 Sunny Akani
- Martin O'Donnell 2–0 James Cahill
- Mark Williams 2–1 Lyu Haotian
- Ali Carter 2–0 Louis Heathcote
- Ben Hancorn 2–0 James Cahill
- Martin O'Donnell 2–0 Lyu Haotian
- Mark Williams 2–1 Louis Heathcote
- Ali Carter 2–1 Sunny Akani
- Ben Hancorn 0–2 Lyu Haotian
- Martin O'Donnell 2–1 Louis Heathcote
- Mark Williams 2–0 Ali Carter
- James Cahill 2–1 Sunny Akani
- Ben Hancorn 1–2 Louis Heathcote
- Martin O'Donnell 0–2 Ali Carter
- Mark Williams 1–2 Sunny Akani
- Lyu Haotian 0–2 James Cahill
- Ben Hancorn 0–2 Ali Carter
- Martin O'Donnell 2–1 Mark Williams
- Louis Heathcote 2–1 James Cahill
- Lyu Haotian 1–2 Sunny Akani
- Ben Hancorn 0–2 Mark Williams
- Martin O'Donnell 1–2 Sunny Akani
- Ali Carter 2–0 James Cahill
- Louis Heathcote 1–2 Lyu Haotian
- Ben Hancorn 0–2 Martin O'Donnell
- Mark Williams 2–0 James Cahill
- Ali Carter 2–1 Lyu Haotian
- Louis Heathcote 0–2 Sunny Akani

==== Table ====
Pos.	Player	P	W	L	FW	FL	FD	Pts
1	Ali Carter (ENG)	7	6	1	12	4	+8	18
2	Mark Williams (WAL)	7	5	2	12	6	+6	15
3	Martin O'Donnell (ENG)	7	5	2	11	6	+5	15
4	Sunny Akani (THA)	7	5	2	12	8	+4	15
5	Lyu Haotian (CHN)	7	2	5	7	11	−4	6
6	Louis Heathcote (ENG)	7	2	5	7	12	−5	6
7	James Cahill (ENG)	7	2	5	5	11	−6	6
8	Ben Hancorn (ENG)	7	1	6	4	12	−8	3

=== Group 2 ===
Group 2 was played on 18 March 2021. Kyren Wilson and Xiao Guodong qualified for the Final Group Stage.

==== Matches ====
- Zhao Xintong 2–1 Lu Ning
- Shaun Murphy 2–1 Stuart Carrington
- Kyren Wilson 2–0 Robert Milkins
- Ben Woollaston 1–2 Xiao Guodong
- Zhao Xintong 0–2 Stuart Carrington
- Shaun Murphy 1–2 Robert Milkins
- Kyren Wilson 2–1 Xiao Guodong
- Ben Woollaston 2–1 Lu Ning
- Zhao Xintong 1–2 Robert Milkins
- Shaun Murphy 0–2 Xiao Guodong
- Kyren Wilson 1–2 Ben Woollaston
- Stuart Carrington 2–0 Lu Ning
- Zhao Xintong 0–2 Xiao Guodong
- Shaun Murphy 0–2 Ben Woollaston
- Kyren Wilson 2–0 Lu Ning
- Robert Milkins 2–1 Stuart Carrington
- Zhao Xintong 1–2 Ben Woollaston
- Shaun Murphy 0–2 Kyren Wilson
- Xiao Guodong 1–2 Stuart Carrington
- Robert Milkins 1–2 Lu Ning
- Zhao Xintong 2–1 Kyren Wilson
- Shaun Murphy 2–0 Lu Ning
- Ben Woollaston 1–2 Stuart Carrington
- Xiao Guodong 2–1 Robert Milkins
- Zhao Xintong 1–2 Shaun Murphy
- Kyren Wilson 2–1 Stuart Carrington
- Ben Woollaston 2–1 Robert Milkins
- Xiao Guodong 2–0 Lu Ning

==== Table ====
Pos.	Player	P	W	L	FW	FL	FD	Pts
1	Kyren Wilson (ENG)	7	5	2	12	6	+6	15
2	Xiao Guodong (CHN)	7	5	2	12	6	+6	15
3	Ben Woollaston (ENG)	7	5	2	12	8	+4	15
4	Stuart Carrington (ENG)	7	4	3	11	8	+3	12
5	Robert Milkins (ENG)	7	3	4	10	12	−2	9
6	Shaun Murphy (ENG)	7	3	4	7	10	−3	9
7	Zhao Xintong (CHN)	7	2	5	7	12	−5	6
8	Lu Ning (CHN)	7	1	6	4	13	−9	3

=== Group 3 ===
Group 3 was played on 19 March 2021. Sam Craigie and Jack Lisowski qualified for the final Group stage.

==== Matches ====
- Barry Hawkins 2–0 Luca Brecel
- Joe Perry 1–2 Mark Davis
- Luo Honghao 1–2 Sam Craigie
- Jack Lisowski 2–1 Fergal O'Brien
- Barry Hawkins 2–1 Mark Davis
- Joe Perry 0–2 Sam Craigie
- Luo Honghao 2–1 Fergal O'Brien
- Jack Lisowski 2–1 Luca Brecel
- Barry Hawkins 2–1 Sam Craigie
- Joe Perry 2–0 Fergal O'Brien
- Luo Honghao 1–2 Jack Lisowski
- Mark Davis 0–2 Luca Brecel
- Barry Hawkins 2–1 Fergal O'Brien
- Joe Perry 0–2 Jack Lisowski
- Luo Honghao 0–2 Luca Brecel
- Sam Craigie 0–2 Mark Davis
- Barry Hawkins 1–2 Jack Lisowski
- Joe Perry 2–1 Luo Honghao
- Fergal O'Brien 2–0 Mark Davis
- Sam Craigie 2–0 Luca Brecel
- Barry Hawkins 0–2 Luo Honghao
- Joe Perry 1–2 Luca Brecel
- Jack Lisowski 1–2 Mark Davis
- Fergal O'Brien 0–2 Sam Craigie
- Barry Hawkins 2–1 Joe Perry
- Luo Honghao 0–2 Mark Davis
- Jack Lisowski 0–2 Sam Craigie
- Fergal O'Brien 0–2 Luca Brecel

==== Table ====
Pos.	Player	P	W	L	FW	FL	FD	Pts
1	Sam Craigie (ENG)	7	5	2	11	5	+6	15
2	Jack Lisowski (ENG)	7	5	2	11	8	+3	15
3	Barry Hawkins (ENG)	7	5	2	11	8	+3	15
4	Luca Brecel (BEL)	7	4	3	9	7	+2	12
5	Mark Davis (ENG)	7	4	3	9	8	+1	12
6	Joe Perry (ENG)	7	2	5	7	11	−4	6
7	Luo Honghao (CHN)	7	2	5	7	11	−4	6
8	Fergal O'Brien (IRL)	7	1	6	5	12	−7	3

=== Group 4 ===
Group 4 was played on 20 March 2021. Judd Trump and Stuart Bingham qualified for the final Group stage.

==== Matches ====
- Stuart Bingham 2–0 Ricky Walden
- Judd Trump 0–2 Dominic Dale
- Oliver Lines 0–2 Ryan Day
- Mark Selby 1–2 Zhou Yuelong
- Stuart Bingham 2–0 Dominic Dale
- Judd Trump 2–1 Ryan Day
- Oliver Lines 2–1 Zhou Yuelong
- Mark Selby 1–2 Ricky Walden
- Stuart Bingham 0–2 Ryan Day
- Judd Trump 2–0 Zhou Yuelong
- Oliver Lines 0–2 Mark Selby
- Dominic Dale 2–1 Ricky Walden
- Stuart Bingham 2–1 Zhou Yuelong
- Judd Trump 2–0 Mark Selby
- Oliver Lines 1–2 Ricky Walden
- Ryan Day 2–0 Dominic Dale
- Stuart Bingham 2–0 Mark Selby
- Judd Trump 2–1 Oliver Lines
- Zhou Yuelong 1–2 Dominic Dale
- Ryan Day 2–1 Ricky Walden
- Stuart Bingham 2–0 Oliver Lines
- Judd Trump 2–1 Ricky Walden
- Mark Selby 2–0 Dominic Dale
- Zhou Yuelong 2–0 Ryan Day
- Stuart Bingham 1–2 Judd Trump
- Oliver Lines 1–2 Dominic Dale
- Mark Selby 2–0 Ryan Day
- Zhou Yuelong 2–1 Ricky Walden

==== Table ====
Pos.	Player	P	W	L	FW	FL	FD	Pts
1	Judd Trump (ENG)	7	6	1	12	6	+6	18
2	Stuart Bingham (ENG)	7	5	2	11	5	+6	15
3	Ryan Day (WAL)	7	4	3	9	7	+2	12
4	Dominic Dale (WAL)	7	4	3	8	9	−1	12
5	Mark Selby (ENG)	7	3	4	8	8	0	9
6	Zhou Yuelong (CHN)	7	3	4	9	10	−1	9
7	Ricky Walden (ENG)	7	2	5	8	12	−4	6
8	Oliver Lines (ENG)	7	1	6	5	13	−8	3

== Final group stage ==
The final group stage also consisted of eight players, and took place on 21 March 2021, with the group winner as the tournament champion. Mark Williams finished top and won the title, with Ali Carter finishing as runner-up and Sam Craigie in third place.

=== Matches ===
- Ali Carter 2–0 Stuart Bingham
- Kyren Wilson 2–1 Jack Lisowski
- Sam Craigie 2–0 Xiao Guodong
- Judd Trump 0–2 Mark Williams
- Ali Carter 2–0 Jack Lisowski
- Kyren Wilson 1–2 Xiao Guodong
- Sam Craigie 0–2 Mark Williams
- Judd Trump 2–0 Stuart Bingham
- Ali Carter 1–2 Xiao Guodong
- Kyren Wilson 1–2 Mark Williams
- Sam Craigie 2–0 Judd Trump
- Jack Lisowski 1–2 Stuart Bingham
- Ali Carter 1–2 Mark Williams
- Kyren Wilson 0–2 Judd Trump
- Sam Craigie 2–0 Stuart Bingham
- Xiao Guodong 2–0 Jack Lisowski
- Ali Carter 2–0 Judd Trump
- Kyren Wilson 1–2 Sam Craigie
- Mark Williams 2–0 Jack Lisowski
- Xiao Guodong 0–2 Stuart Bingham
- Ali Carter 2–1 Sam Craigie
- Kyren Wilson 0–2 Stuart Bingham
- Judd Trump 2–0 Jack Lisowski
- Mark Williams 2–1 Xiao Guodong
- Ali Carter 2–0 Kyren Wilson
- Sam Craigie 2–1 Jack Lisowski
- Judd Trump 2–0 Xiao Guodong
- Mark Williams 1–2 Stuart Bingham

=== Table ===
Pos.	Player	P	W	L	FW	FL	FD	Pts
Winner	Mark Williams (WAL)	7	6	1	13	5	+8	18
Runner-up	Ali Carter (ENG)	7	5	2	12	5	+7	15
3	Sam Craigie (ENG)	7	5	2	11	6	+5	15
4	Judd Trump (ENG)	7	4	3	8	6	+2	12
5	Stuart Bingham (ENG)	7	4	3	8	8	0	12
6	Xiao Guodong (CHN)	7	3	4	7	10	−3	9
7	Kyren Wilson (ENG)	7	1	6	5	13	−8	3
8	Jack Lisowski (ENG)	7	0	7	3	14	−11	0

Key: P = Matches played; W = Matches won; L = Matches lost; FW = Frames won; FL = Frames lost; FD = Frame difference

== Century breaks ==
A total of 146 century breaks were made during the tournament.

- 147, 106 – Gary Wilson
- 143, 133, 105, 101, 100 – Zhao Xintong
- 143, 132, 128, 115, 112, 100 – Sam Craigie
- 143, 101, 100 – Jimmy Robertson
- 142, 140, 125, 116 – Mark Selby
- 142, 135, 109 – Joe Perry
- 142, 115, 102 – Robert Milkins
- 141, 135, 130, 129, 115, 103, 101, 100 – Ali Carter
- 141 – Ronnie O'Sullivan
- 140 – Rod Lawler
- 140 – Elliot Slessor
- 140 – Jimmy White
- 138 – Mitchell Mann
- 137, 135, 103 – Ben Woollaston
- 137, 134, 124, 117 – Stuart Bingham
- 137, 120 – Stuart Carrington
- 137, 110 – Lyu Haotian
- 136, 134, 111 – Zhou Yuelong
- 136, 115, 112 – Anthony McGill
- 136, 115 – Yuan Sijun
- 136 – Anthony Hamilton
- 135, 132, 129, 126, 113, 104, 101 – Kyren Wilson
- 135 – Joe O'Connor
- 134, 133, 117, 113 – Fergal O'Brien
- 134 – Paul Davison
- 133, 131, 105 – Lu Ning
- 133 – Ashley Hugill
- 132, 117, 108, 100 – Alexander Ursenbacher
- 132, 105 – Barry Hawkins
- 129 – Ricky Walden
- 128, 121, 118, 116, 116, 101, 100 – Judd Trump
- 127, 126, 123, 104 – Xiao Guodong
- 127 – Florian Nüßle
- 126 – Tian Pengfei
- 125, 107 – Jamie Jones
- 124, 116 – Martin O'Donnell
- 122 – Nigel Bond
- 122 – Jackson Page
- 121, 116, 107, 106, 104 – Shaun Murphy
- 121 – Chen Zifan
- 120, 102 – Luca Brecel
- 120 – Oliver Lines
- 119, 100 – Igor Figueiredo
- 113, 101 – Chris Wakelin
- 113 – Louis Heathcote
- 111 – Jak Jones
- 111 – Alan McManus
- 111 – Noppon Saengkham
- 110 Brian Ochoiski
- 108, 102, 101 – Mark Williams
- 107, 105 – Michael Holt
- 107, 101 – Zhao Jianbo
- 107 – Xu Si
- 106, 103, 102 – Jack Lisowski
- 106 Dylan Emery
- 105 – Jordan Brown
- 105 – Jamie Clarke
- 104, 102 – Allan Taylor
- 103 – Kacper Filipiak
- 102 – Mark Davis
- 102 – David Gilbert
- 102 – Steven Hallworth
- 101, 100 – Ryan Day
- 101 – Andrew Higginson
- 101 – Li Hang
- 100 – Simon Lichtenberg
- 100 – Riley Parsons
