= Florian Nüßle =

Austrian snooker player

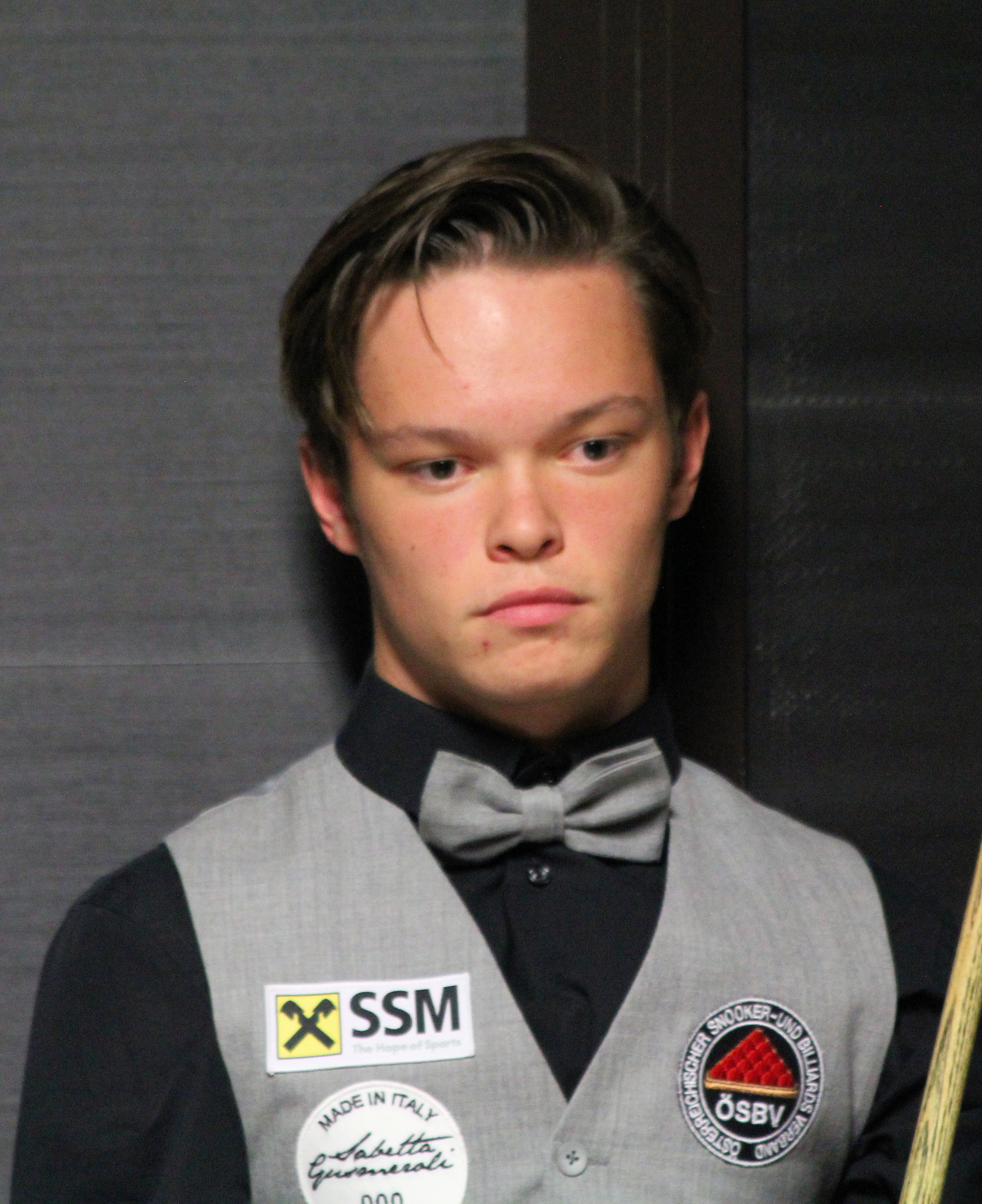
- Paul Hunter Classic 2018

Personal information
- Nickname: The Composer
- Born: 18 December 2001 (age 24) Graz, Austria

Sport
- Country: Austria
- Sport: Snooker
- Professional: 2025–present
- Highest ranking: 89 (August 2026)
- Current ranking: 94 (as of 7 November 2026)
- Best ranking finish: Quarter-final (2024 Shoot Out)

Florian Nüßle (born 18 December 2001) is an Austrian professional snooker player from Graz. In 2017, aged 16, he became his country's youngest national snooker champion. In March 2025, he won his Q Tour Playoff to gain a two-year professional tour card starting from the 2025–26 season, becoming the first professional snooker player from Austria.

== Career ==
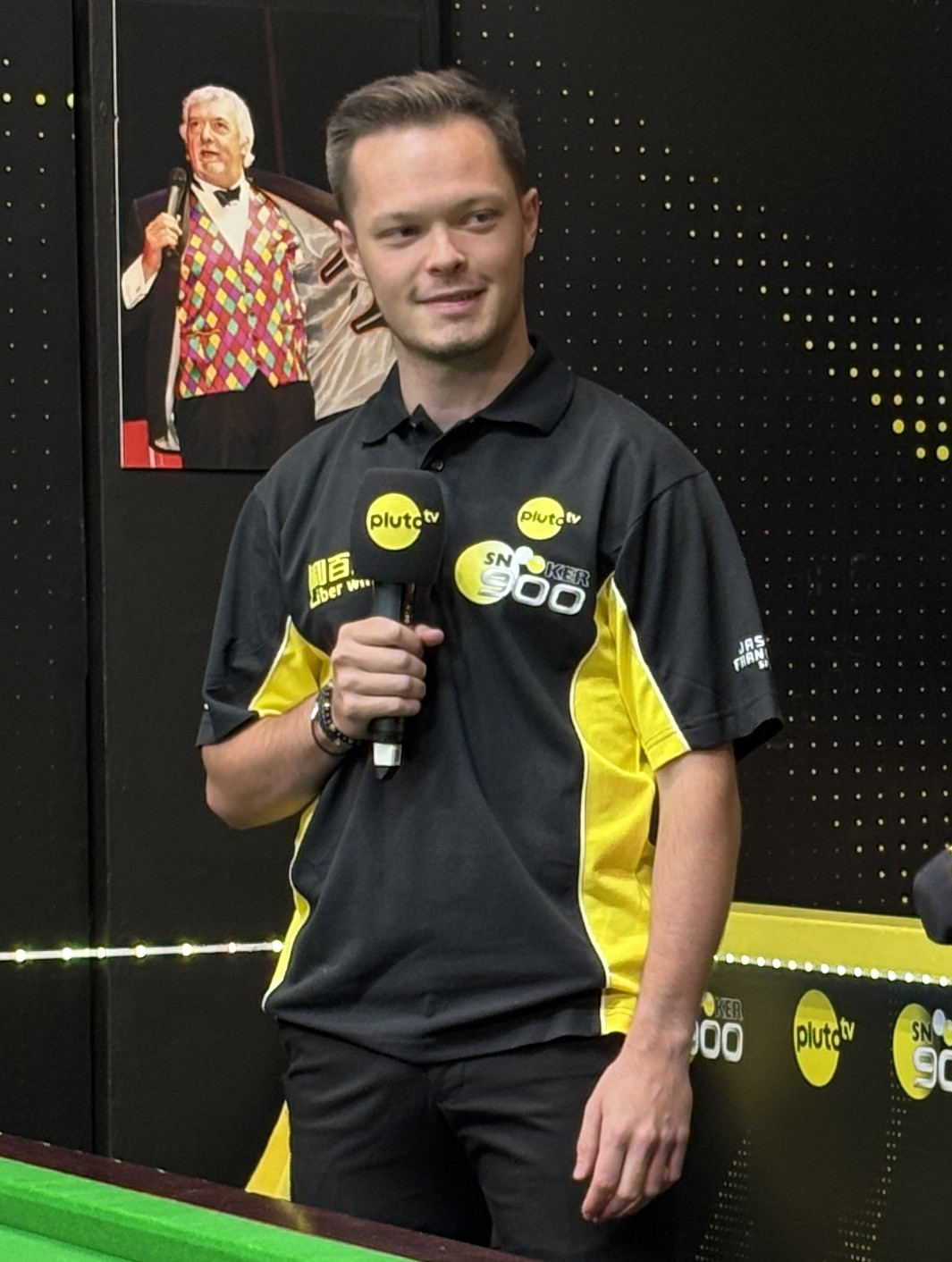
Nüßle in 2026

=== National tournaments ===
Florian Nüßle became interested in snooker as a child and played pool with a standing aid when he was five years old. He also played football in his youth for five years for SK Sturm Graz, and golf, but ultimately opted for snooker. After obtaining his secondary school certificate he went to the UK with the aim of becoming a professional player.

He first participated in the Austrian national youth championships in 2007, and won his first national title in the under–16 age group at the age of 13, defending his title in the following two years. In 2015 he won the under–21 title and defended it in the years that followed. At 16, he became the youngest player to win the national championship when he won the Austrian National Championship. He also became ranked as Austrian number one that season. In 2018 he played Andreas Ploner in the final, winning 5–2.

=== International tournaments ===
After his first national youth title, he played in the EBSA European Under-21 Snooker Championships and IBSF World Under-21 Snooker Championship. At the 2017 event, he reached the quarter-finals of the under-21 event. He also entered the IBSF World Snooker Championship that year, reaching the semi-finals losing to eventual champion Pankaj Advani 4–7. From 2017, he competed in the annual pro-am Paul Hunter Classic (PHC), an amateur tournament from the World Snooker Tour. He would defeat professional player Elliot Slessor during the 2018 event.

=== Professional career ===
In March 2025, Nüßle defeated Estonian former professional Andres Petrov 10‍–‍3 in the final of Playoff 3 of the 2024–25 Q Tour to gain a professional tour card for the 2025–26 and 2026–27 snooker seasons, becoming the first professional snooker player from Austria.

== Performance and rankings timeline ==
Tournament	2017/ 18	2018/ 19	2019/ 20	2020/ 21	2022/ 23	2023/ 24	2024/ 25	2025/ 26	2026/ 27
Ranking (Note: It shows the ranking at the beginning of the season)	(Note: He was an amateur)							(Note: New players on the Main Tour don't have a ranking)	93
Ranking tournaments
Championship League	Non-Ranking			A	RR	RR	RR	RR	RR
China Open	A	A	Tournament Not Held						LQ
Wuhan Open	Tournament Not Held					A	A	LQ	LQ
British Open	Not Held			A	A	A	A	LQ	LQ
English Open	A	A	A	A	A	A	A	LQ	1R
Shenzhen Open (Note: The event was called the Xi'an Grand Prix (2024/2025–2025/2026))	Tournament Not Held						A	LQ	LQ
Northern Ireland Open	A	A	A	A	A	A	LQ	LQ	LQ
International Championship	A	A	A	Not Held		A	A	LQ	LQ
UK Championship	A	A	A	A	A	A	LQ	LQ	LQ
Shoot Out	A	A	A	A	1R	1R	QF	2R	
Scottish Open	A	A	A	A	A	A	A	LQ	
German Masters	A	A	A	LQ	A	A	A	LQ	LQ
Welsh Open	A	A	A	A	A	A	1R	LQ	
World Grand Prix	DNQ	DNQ	DNQ	DNQ	DNQ	DNQ	DNQ	DNQ	
Players Championship	DNQ	DNQ	DNQ	DNQ	DNQ	DNQ	DNQ	DNQ	
World Open	A	A	A	Not Held		A	A	1R	
Tour Championship	NH	DNQ	DNQ	DNQ	DNQ	DNQ	DNQ	DNQ	
World Championship	A	LQ	LQ	LQ	LQ	A	LQ	LQ	
Former ranking tournaments
Paul Hunter Classic	LQ	1R	NR	Tournament Not Held					
WST Pro Series	Not Held			RR	Tournament Not Held				
European Masters	A	A	LQ	1R	LQ	A	Not Held		
Saudi Arabia Masters	Tournament Not Held						A	1R	NH
Former non-ranking tournaments
Paul Hunter Classic	Ranking		1R	Tournament Not Held					

Performance Table Legend
LQ	lost in the qualifying draw	#R	lost in the early rounds of the tournament (WR = Wildcard round, RR = Round robin)	QF	lost in the quarter-finals
SF	lost in the semi-finals	F	lost in the final	W	won the tournament
DNQ	did not qualify for the tournament	A	did not participate in the tournament	WD	withdrew from the tournament

NH / Not Held	means an event was not held.
NR / Non-Ranking Event	means an event is/was no longer a ranking event.
R / Ranking Event	means an event is/was a ranking event.
MR / Minor-Ranking Event	means an event is/was a minor-ranking event.

== Career finals ==
=== Pro-am finals: 1 (1 title) ===
Outcome	No.	Year	Championship	Opponent in the final	Score
Winner	1.	2023	Vienna Snooker Open	(Germany) Lukas Kleckers	5–0

=== Amateur finals: 21 (16 titles) ===
Outcome	No.	Year	Championship	Opponent in the final	Score
Winner	1.	2013	Austrian Under-16 Championship	(Austria) Oskar Charlesworth	3–2
Winner	2.	2016	Austrian Under-21 Championship	(Austria) Manuel Pomwenger	3–0
Winner	3.	2017	Austrian Amateur Championship	(Austria) Oskar Charlesworth	5–0
Winner	4.	2018	Austrian Amateur Championship (2)	(Austria) Andreas Ploner	5–2
Runner-up	1.	2018	EBSA European Under-18 Snooker Championships	(Wales) Jackson Page	3–5
Winner	5.	2019	Austrian Amateur Championship (3)	(Austria) Andreas Ploner	5–4
Winner	6.	2020	Austrian Amateur Championship (4)	(Austria) Jérôme Liedtke	5–0
Winner	7.	2021	Wels Open	(Austria) Manuel Pomwenger	4–0
Winner	8.	2022	Austrian Amateur Championship (5)	(Austria) Thomas Janzso	5–1
Winner	9.	2022	IBSF World Under-21 Snooker Championship	(Thailand) Taweesap Kongkitchertchoo	6–5
Runner-up	2.	2022	EBSA European Under-21 Snooker Championships	(Belgium) Ben Mertens	1–5
Winner	10.	2023	Austrian Amateur Championship (6)	(Austria) Oskar Charlesworth	5–1
Runner-up	3.	2023	Q Tour – Playoff	(England) Ashley Carty	2–5
Runner-up	4.	2023	Wels Open	(Israel) Shachar Ruberg	3–4
Winner	11.	2024	Austrian Amateur Championship (7)	(Austria) Thomas Janzso	5–2
Runner-up	5.	2024	German Grand Prix - Event 5	(Germany) Richard Wienold	2–3
Winner	12.	2024	EBSA European 6-Reds Championship	(England) Stuart Watson	5–3
Winner	13.	2024	Wels Open (2)	(Hungary) Nicolas Le Clercq	5–0
Winner	14.	2024	Italian Snooker Masters	(England) Peter Devlin	4–2
Winner	15.	2025	Austrian Amateur Championship (8)	(Austria) Lukas Stötzer	5–0
Winner	16.	2026	Wels Open (3)	(Austria) Paul Schopf	4–0
