= 2025 Saudi Arabia Snooker Masters =

Snooker tournament

Tournament information
- Dates: 8–16 August 2025
- Venue: Prince Abdullah Al-Faisal Sports City
- City: Jeddah
- Country: Saudi Arabia
- Organisation: World Snooker Tour
- Format: Ranking event
- Total prize fund: £2,302,000
- Winner's share: £500,000
- Highest break: Thepchaiya Un-Nooh (THA) (147); Ronnie O'Sullivan (ENG) (147 x2)

Final
- Champion: Neil Robertson (AUS)
- Runner-up: Ronnie O'Sullivan (ENG)
- Score: 10–9

The 2025 Saudi Arabia Snooker Masters was a professional snooker tournament that took place from 8 to 16 August 2025 at Green Halls, Prince Abdullah Al-Faisal Sports City, in Jeddah, Saudi Arabia. The second and last edition of the tournament, which had first been staged in Riyadh in 2024, it was the second ranking event of the 2025–26 snooker season, following the 2025 Championship League and preceding the 2025 Wuhan Open. It featured 144 participants, including 16 regional wildcard players. The tournament was broadcast by local channels in Saudi Arabia and by other broadcasters globally. The winner received £500,000 from a total prize fund of £2,302,000.

Judd Trump was the defending champion, having defeated Mark Williams 10–9 in the 2024 final, but he lost 3–5 to Oliver Lines in the fifth round (the last 32). Neil Robertson led Ronnie O'Sullivan 7–2 in the best-of-19-frame final. O'Sullivan took seven of the next eight frames to lead 9–8, but Robertson won the last two frames for a 10–9 victory, securing the 26th ranking title of his professional career. As in 2024, the final of the event went to a deciding frame.

The tournament produced 91 century breaks, including three maximum breaks. Thepchaiya Un-Nooh made the fifth maximum of his career in his third-round match against Jordan Brown, and O'Sullivan made the 16th and 17th maximums of his career in his semi-final match against Chris Wakelin. O'Sullivan became the second player to make two maximums in the same match, following Jackson Page at the 2025 World Championship qualifiers, and the first to make two maximums in the same session or on the same day. He won a £147,000 bonus for making two maximums across the season's four eligible tournaments and earned two-thirds of the event's £50,000 maximum break prize, with the other third going to Un-Nooh. The maximums were O'Sullivan's first in almost seven years—following his 15th official 147 at the 2018 English Open—and made him the oldest player to record an official maximum break, at the age of 49 years and 253 days. The maximums made at the event were respectively the third, fourth, and fifth of the season and the 220th, 221st, and 222nd official maximums in professional snooker history. O'Sullivan also made the 1,300th century break of his career at the tournament, while Mark Selby made his 900th career century.

== Overview ==
Organised by the World Snooker Tour and the Saudi Arabian Billiard & Snooker Federation (SABSF), the Saudi Arabia Snooker Masters was held under the supervision of the Ministry of Sport for Saudi Arabia. First staged in September 2024 in Riyadh, it was the first ranking tournament held in Saudi Arabia and was promoted as snooker's "fourth major" alongside the three Triple Crown events—the World Championship, the UK Championship and the Masters. When the tournament was launched in 2024, its prize fund of over £2 million was the second-largest after the World Championship, while its winner's prize of £500,000 was equivalent to that at the World Championship. Judd Trump won the inaugural event, where he came from 62 points behind in the deciding frame of the final to defeat Mark Williams on the last black ball. In May 2025, it was announced that the tournament would move to Jeddah, where the 2025 edition took place from 8 to 16 August 2025 at Green Halls, Prince Abdullah Al-Faisal Sports City. It was the second ranking event of the 2025–26 snooker season, following the 2025 Championship League and preceding the 2025 Wuhan Open. In April 2026, the World Snooker Tour announced that the tournament had been cancelled by mutual agreement between the Saudi Arabian Billiard & Snooker Federation and Matchroom Sport, making the 2025 edition the last to be staged.

=== Participants ===
A total of 144 players entered the tournament, including 16 regional wildcard players. The wildcards included eleven players from Saudi Arabia (Omar Alajlani, Ayman Alamri, Saud Albaker, Fahad Alghamdi, Musaad Almisfir, Abdullah Alotayyani, Ziyad Alqabbani, Abdullah Alshammari, Ahmed Aseeri, Abdulraouf Saigh, and Musab Sayegh), two from Pakistan (Adeel Aqdus and Asif Mukhtar), and one each from Bahrain, Egypt, and the United Arab Emirates (Habib Subah Humood, Hesham Shawky, and Mohammed Al Joker respectively).

Due to a fixture clash with the 2025 World Games, which took place from 7 to 17 August in Chengdu, China, the world number 13 Xiao Guodong and the reigning World Women's Champion Bai Yulu did not enter. Both players went on to win gold medals in snooker at the 2025 World Games, in the men's event and women's event respectively. On giving up the opportunity to compete in the Saudi Arabia Snooker Masters, Xiao said: "For me, national honour comes above everything else. Any time I get the chance to represent my country, I will give it my all—my only goal is the gold medal." Luca Brecel, the 2023 World Champion, withdrew from the tournament for medical reasons and his third-round opponent, Sanderson Lam, received a walkover.

=== Format ===
The tournament used a tiered format similar to the World Championship and UK Championship, with the top 16 players in the snooker world rankings, as they stood after the 2025 Championship League, being seeded through to the last 32, the fifth round of the tournament. (Note: This included Ali Carter (ranked 17th) because of the withdrawal of Xiao Guodong (ranked 13th).) The first four rounds featured all lower-ranked players as well as the invited regional wildcards and Q School top-ups. Players seeded 49 to 80 received byes into the second round, and players seeded 17 to 48 received byes into the third round.

The first three rounds were played as the best of 7 frames while the fourth and fifth rounds were the best of 9 frames. The last 16, quarter-finals and semi-finals were the best of 11 frames and the final was the best of 19 frames, played over two sessions.

=== Broadcasters ===
The tournament was broadcast by Saudi Sports Company (SSC) and Shahid domestically in Saudi Arabia. It was broadcast by TNT Sports and Discovery+ in the United Kingdom and Ireland; by Eurosport in mainland Europe; by Discovery+ in Germany, Italy, and Austria; and by HBO Max in other European territories. It was broadcast by Migu, Huya, the CBSA-WPBSA Academy WeChat channel, and the CBSA-WPBSA Academy Douyin channel in mainland China; by Now TV in Hong Kong; by TrueSports in Thailand; by Sportcast in Taiwan; and by TAP Sports in the Philippines. In all other territories, it was broadcast by WST Play.

=== Prize fund ===
The prize fund for the tournament is detailed below. In addition, during the 2025–26 snooker season, a player who made two maximum breaks across the four qualifying events—the 2025 Saudi Arabia Snooker Masters, the 2025 UK Championship (including qualifiers), the 2026 Masters, and the 2026 World Championship (including qualifiers)—would win a bonus of £147,000. The bonus could be won up to three times, including multiple times by the same player.

- Winner: £500,000
- Runner-up: £200,000
- Semi-final: £100,000
- Quarter-final: £50,000
- Last 16: £30,000
- Last 32: £20,000
- Last 48: £11,000
- Last 80: £7,000
- Last 112: £4,000
- Last 144: £2,000
- 147 break: £50,000
- Total: £2,302,000

== Summary ==
=== First round (last 144) ===
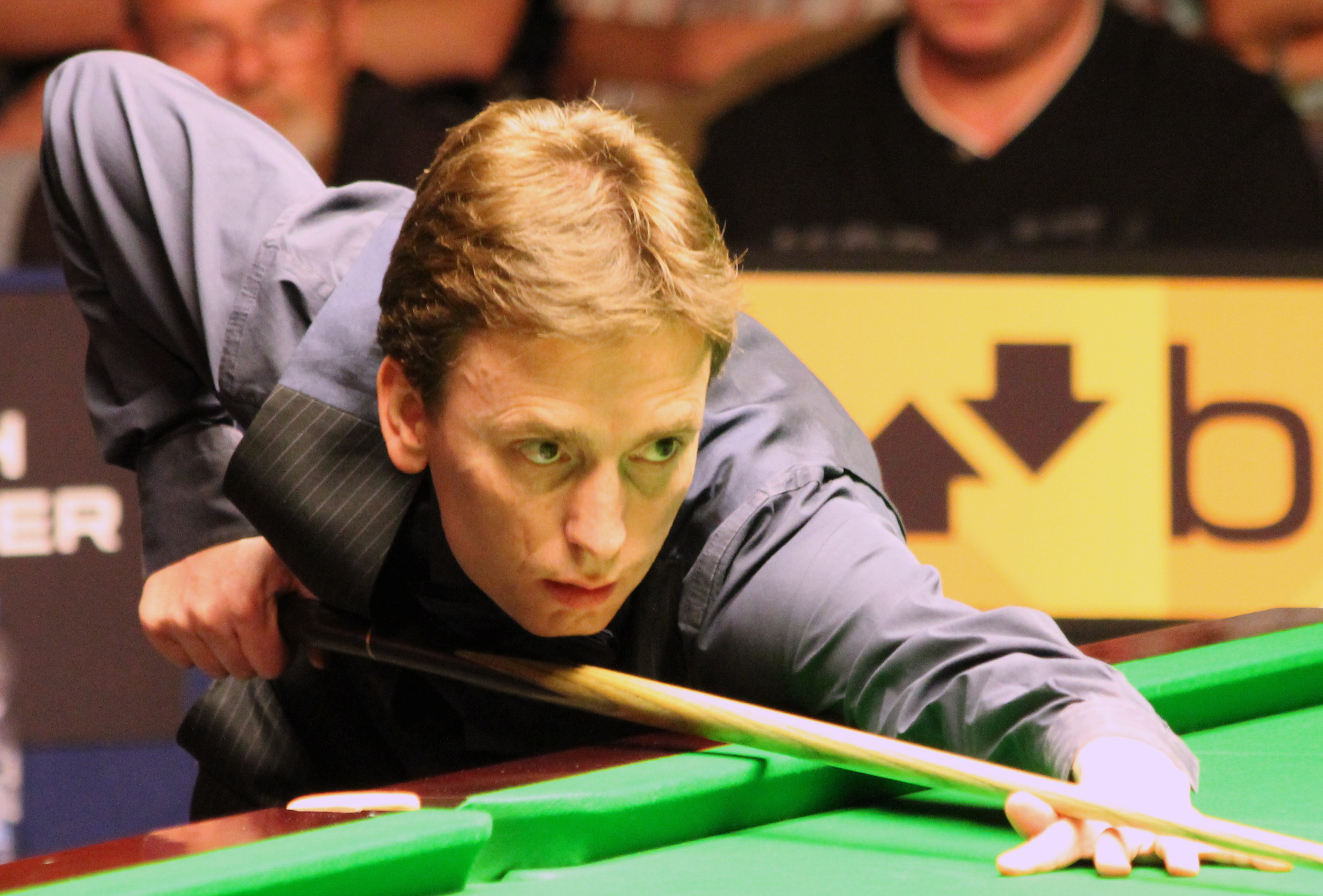
Ken Doherty (pictured in 2012) defeated fellow veteran Jimmy White 4–1 in the first round. It was their first professional meeting since the 2010 World Championship qualifiers.

The first round was scheduled to be played on 8 August as the best of seven frames. It featured the 16 regional wildcard players, amateur top-up players from the Q School Order of Merit, and players seeded 81 and below. Due to technical issues, seven first-round matches were postponed until the morning of 9 August, when they were played in an untelevised session. Veteran players Ken Doherty, aged 55, and Jimmy White, aged 63, met in professional competition for the first time since the 2010 World Championship qualifying rounds. Doherty won the match 4–1, making three half-century breaks of 96, 59, and 64. Reanne Evans, a 12-time World Women's Champion, defeated Kreishh Gurbaxani 4–2. It was her third consecutive professional victory of the season in knock-out tournaments, following her wins in the qualifying rounds of the 2025 Wuhan Open (held in June) and the 2025 British Open. Evans was the only female player to reach the second round, as Mink Nutcharut lost 1–4 to amateur player Umut Dikme and Ng On-yee lost 3–4 to Hatem Yassen.

Sahil Nayyar, who had earned a two-year tour card by winning the 2024 Pan-American Open Championship, secured his first professional victory with a 4–1 win over wildcard player Habib Subah Humood. Michał Szubarczyk, aged 14, who had recently become the youngest ever professional snooker player, also recorded his first win on the tour by defeating Ryan Davies 4–2. Dylan Emery led Florian Nüßle 3–0. Nüßle recovered to tie the scores, but Emery won the deciding frame on the colours. Steven Hallworth recorded a whitewash victory over wildcard player Omar Alajlani, Saudi Arabia's top-ranked amateur. Hesham Shawky was the only wildcard player to reach the second round, after a 4–2 win over Jiang Jun. Chang Bingyu, who had served a two-year ban for match-fixing offences, and then earned a new professional tour card by winning the 2025 Asia-Pacific Snooker Championship, defeated Marco Fu in a deciding frame. Iulian Boiko advanced with a 4–2 win over Liu Wenwei.

=== Second round (last 112) ===
The second round was played on 9 August as the best of seven frames. It featured the winners of the first round against players seeded 49 to 80. Szubarczyk made a 93 break in the fourth frame against Bulcsú Révész and went on to win the match in a deciding frame, commenting afterwards that "I need to improve my safety". Evans lost two of the first three frames against Liam Davies but then won three consecutive frames for a 4–2 victory. Stan Moody trailed Liam Highfield 2–3 but produced back-to-back centuries of 130 and 109 to win the match 4–3. The deciding frame between Hallworth and Michael Holt came down to a safety battle on the last pink ball. After a safety error from Holt, Hallworth potted the pink in a middle pocket to secure a 4–3 win.

Ben Mertens made an 87 break in the deciding frame to defeat Ross Muir. Sam Craigie, who had not competed the previous season due to injury, but had been awarded a new two-year tour card on medical grounds, made centuries of 122 and 104 as he whitewashed Mark Davis. "In practice I feel better than ever, and today was the first time I have shown that in a match," he said afterwards. Boiko made five half-centuries as he defeated Zak Surety 4–1. Doherty lost a deciding frame to Artemijs Žižins after he missed a long pot on the last red and went in-off. Julien Leclercq advanced with a 4–1 win over Dikme. Chatchapong Nasa, playing his first season on the professional tour, arrived late for his match against David Lilley, a former World Seniors Champion. Nasa was docked the first frame, but he won the match after taking the deciding frame on the colours.

=== Third round (last 80) ===
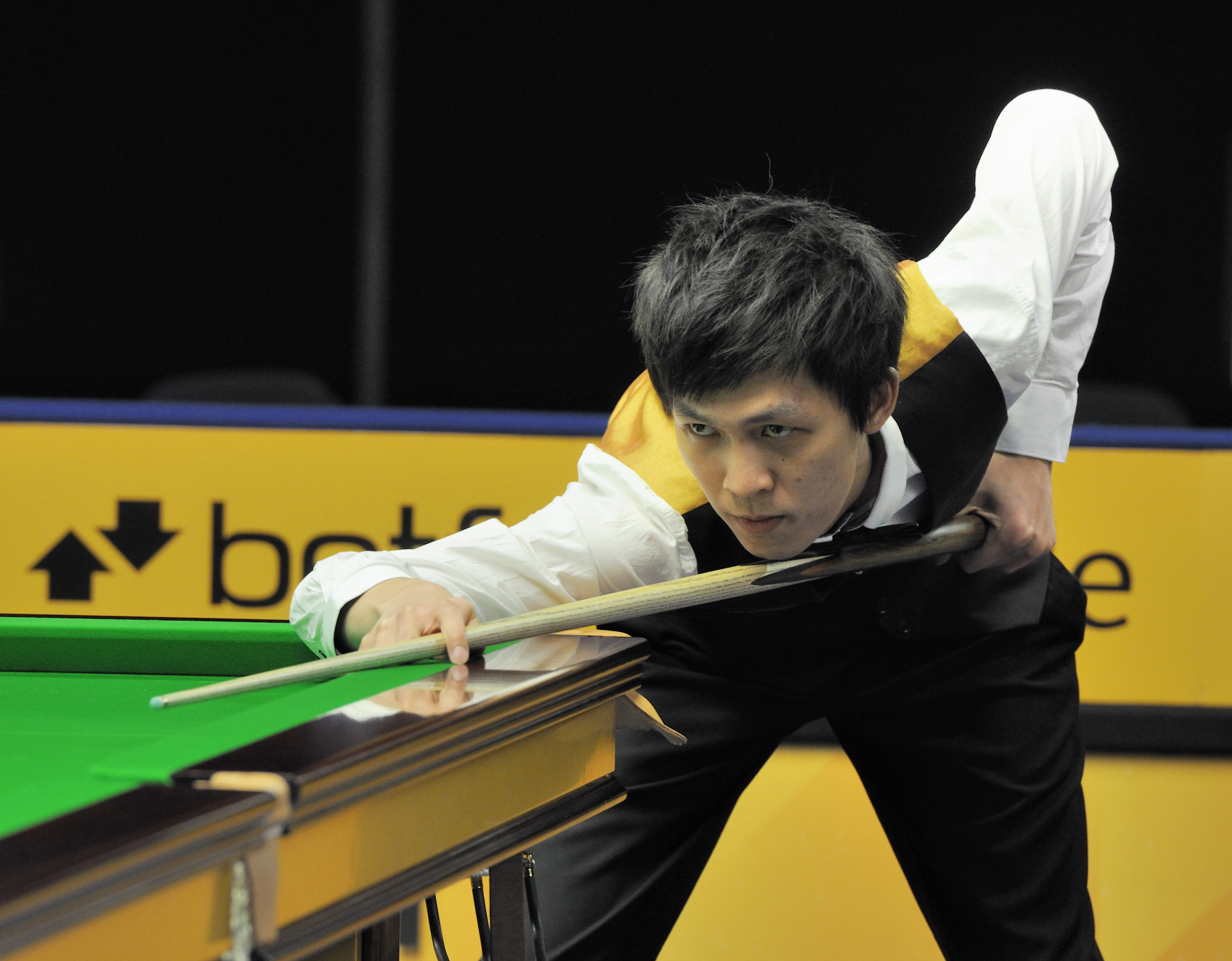
Thepchaiya Un-Nooh (pictured in 2013) made the fifth maximum break of his career. Later in the tournament, he attempted another maximum to win a £147,000 bonus but missed the 13th red.

The third round was played on 10 August as the best of seven frames. It featured the winners of the second round against players seeded 17 to 48. Thepchaiya Un-Nooh made the fifth maximum break of his career in his whitewash victory over Jordan Brown, becoming the 15th player in professional snooker history to reach the milestone of five maximums. It was the third maximum break of the season and the 220th official maximum in professional snooker history.

Jack Lisowski made breaks of 81 and 88 as he whitewashed Evans. Hallworth trailed Jimmy Robertson 0–2 and 1–3 but tied the scores at 3–3 and then won the deciding frame with a clearance on the colours. The match between Oliver Lines and Matthew Selt also went to a deciding frame, which culminated in a safety battle on the last pink. Lines secured victory by potting pink and black after Selt went in-off the pink. Stuart Bingham defeated Szubarczyk 4–1, and Moody made a 142 break as he defeated Ryan Day 4–2. Aaron Hill made a 120 break against Robert Milkins and won the match in a deciding frame. Gary Wilson also advanced after winning a decider against Gao Yang.

Hossein Vafaei made a 135 break as he defeated Leclercq 4–1. He spoke afterwards about undergoing treatment for a spinal problem that had caused pain in his neck, shoulder, and left arm for the previous seven months. "I have had physiotherapy and I am doing exercises to help but it needs time to heal," he said. Chang led Daniel Wells 3–0 and was on the verge of a whitewash victory, leading by 64 points in frame four. However, Wells won the frame with a 73 clearance and went on to tie the scores at 3–3, helped by a 131 break in the sixth. In the decider, Wells established a 63-point lead, but Chang recovered to win the frame and match on the colours. Boiko progressed by beating Jackson Page 4–2, while Louis Heathcote advanced with a whitewash win over Lei Peifan. Wu Yize defeated Ashley Hugill 4–1, and Ben Woollaston beat Nasa by the same score. Stephen Maguire, who had recently won the 2025 Championship League, came from 2–3 behind against Allan Taylor to win the match in a deciding frame.

=== Fourth round (last 48) ===
The fourth round was played on 11 August as the best of nine frames. It featured all 32 winners from the third round. Joe O'Connor, runner-up in the 2025 Championship League, made breaks of 97, 69, and 112 as he whitewashed Sanderson Lam. Maguire whitewashed Anthony McGill, making breaks of 52, 128, 81, 52, 64, and 64. Afterwards, he called the match "the best I have played this season by a mile." Woollaston lost the first two frames against Lisowski but recovered to win the match in a deciding frame. "Beating [Mark Selby] at the [2025 World Championship] gave me a lot of confidence in my safety play," said Woollaston afterwards.

Un-Nooh lost the first frame against the 2024 World Championship runner-up Jak Jones but took five consecutive frames with breaks of 57, 67, 95, 110, and 103 for a 5–1 victory. Yuan Sijun whitewashed Moody, making a highest break of 89, and Lines made a 106 century as he defeated Noppon Saengkham 5–2. Elliot Slessor recovered from 1–4 behind to defeat Lan Yuhao in a deciding frame. Wu made breaks of 73, 105, 124, 73, and 95 as he beat Matthew Stevens 5–1. Four players who started in the first round—Farakh Ajaib, Boiko, Chang, and Hallworth—advanced to the fifth round. Ajaib beat Jamie Jones 5–2, and Boiko defeated Heathcote in a deciding frame. Chang defeated David Gilbert 5–3, and Hallworth defeated Zhou Yuelong by the same score. Martin O'Donnell also progressed with a 5–3 win over Vafaei.

=== Fifth round (last 32) ===
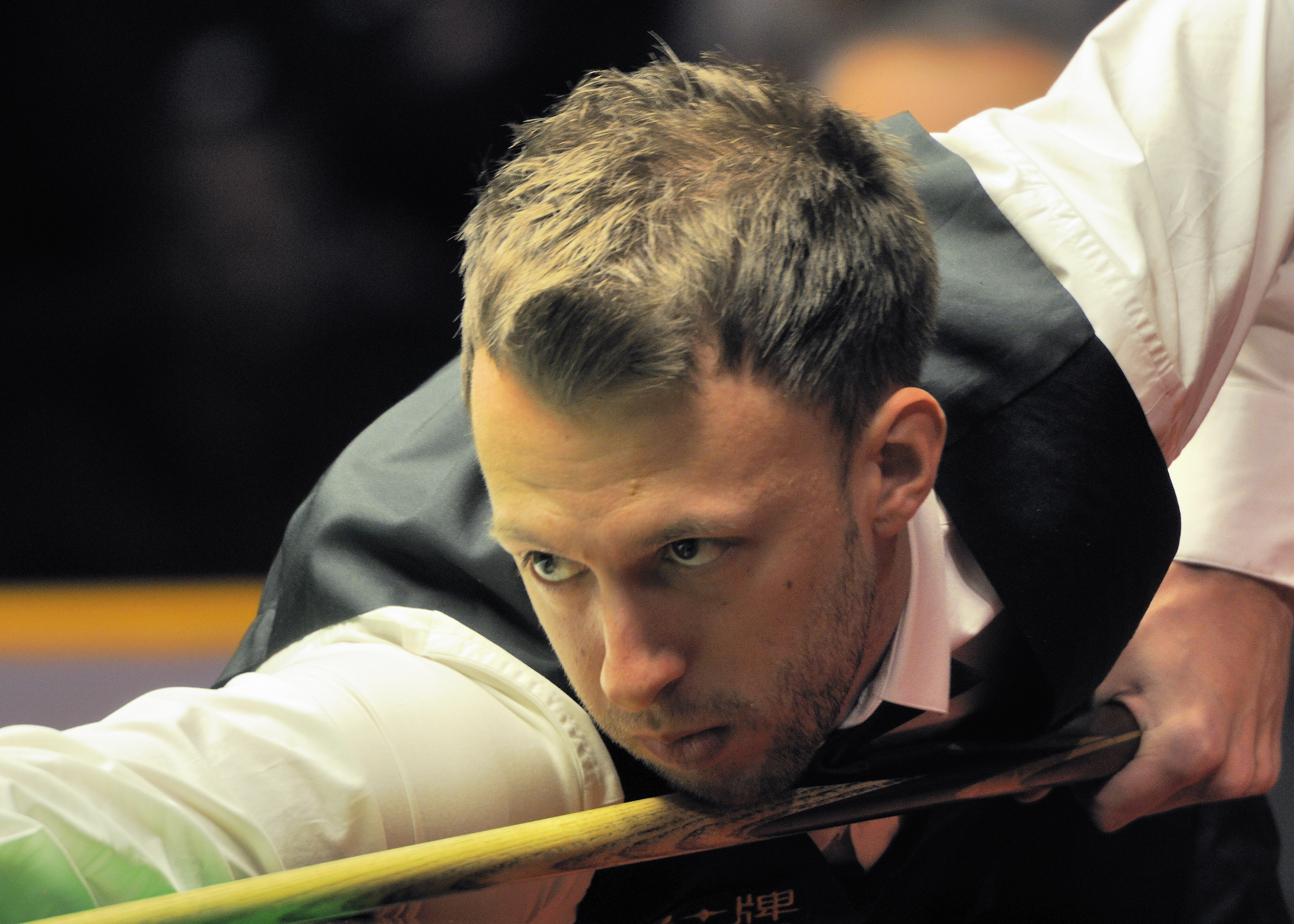
The world number one and defending champion Judd Trump (pictured in 2014) lost 3–5 to the world number 68 Oliver Lines.

The fifth round was played on 12 August as the best of nine frames. It featured the 16 winners from the fourth round against the top 16 seeds. Facing the world number 68 Lines, the world number one and defending champion Judd Trump won the first frame, but Lines then made breaks of 125, 63, and 71 as he won four consecutive frames. Trump won the next two, making a 102 century in the seventh, but Lines secured a 5–3 victory with a 100 century in frame eight. "I am really proud of the way I played today," said Lines afterwards, calling the win the best of his career. Trailing Slessor 3–4, John Higgins attempted a maximum break in frame eight but missed the 13th red. In the deciding frame, Higgins had an opportunity to make a match-winning clearance from 47 points behind, but he missed the last red while on a break of 34. Slessor went on to secure a 5–4 victory.

Shaun Murphy defeated Un-Nooh 5–1, making two centuries of 125 and 118. Un-Nooh had an opportunity to make his second maximum of the tournament in frame five, which would have won him a £147,000 bonus, but he missed the 13th red. Bingham made five half-centuries as he defeated Zhang Anda 5–2. Afterwards, he commented that his weight loss of 3.5 stone (49 pounds; 22 kilograms) that year had benefited his form, saying: "I was having trouble with my knee and back and that is better now." Neil Robertson made three centuries of 120, 114, and 106 as he defeated Woollaston 5–2. Mark Williams beat Yuan 5–3, and Selby defeated Long Zehuang by the same score. Recent 2025 Shanghai Masters runner-up Ali Carter made a 132 century in the deciding frame to beat Gary Wilson 5–4.

Playing with a new cue made by Sunny Akani, Ronnie O'Sullivan whitewashed O'Connor, making breaks of 116, 89, 53, and 90 in the last four frames. Zhao Xintong, the reigning World Champion, also recorded a whitewash win, making breaks of 92, 132, 97, 94, and 106 as he defeated Hallworth in 55 minutes. The world number two Kyren Wilson, recent winner of the 2025 Shanghai Masters, fell 2–4 behind against Boiko but made three half-century breaks to secure a 5–4 win. Chris Wakelin beat Ajaib 5–1, and Ding Junhui defeated Maguire 5–2. Si Jiahui, a semi-finalist the previous year, beat Wu 5–3, and Barry Hawkins defeated O'Donnell by the same score. From 1–3 behind against Chang, Mark Allen won three frames in a row to lead 4–3, but Chang won the last two frames for a 5–4 victory. The last remaining player in the event who started in the first round, Chang reached the last 16 of a ranking tournament for the first time.

=== Sixth round (last 16) ===
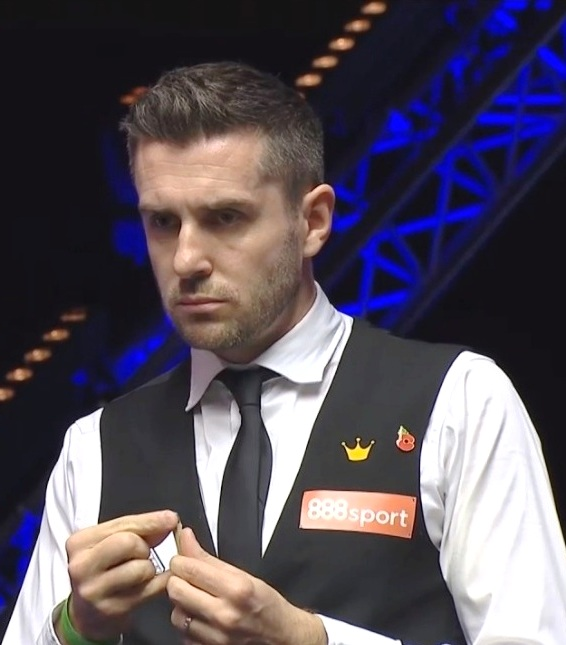
Mark Selby (pictured in 2020) made his 900th century break in professional competition, becoming the fifth player to reach that milestone.

The sixth round was played on 13 August as the best of 11 frames. In the second frame of his match against Neil Robertson, Selby made his 900th century break in professional competition, becoming the fifth player to reach that milestone. Robertson made breaks of 70 and 111 to lead 3–1 at the mid-session interval. Selby won three consecutive frames with half-century breaks to lead 4–3, but Robertson also took three frames in a row, making breaks of 83 and 137, as he secured a 6–4 win. It was the second consecutive year Robertson had eliminated Selby from the tournament. Facing Murphy, Williams won the first two frames and then recovered from 61 points behind to take the third with a 74 clearance. The next two frames were shared. Williams produced a 30 clearance to win the sixth frame on the last black and made a 102 century in the seventh to complete a 6–1 victory. During the match, Williams played some shots with his eyes closed. "Everything's a blur and I do it to see how well I am cueing," he explained after the match.

Bingham trailed Slessor 1–4 but then won four consecutive frames for a 5–4 lead. However, Slessor took frame 10 on the colours and then won the decider with a 72 break. "I missed a few chances from 4–1 so my back was against the wall," Slessor said afterwards. Carter trailed Lines 1–3 but won five consecutive frames for a 6–3 victory. "I played great after the interval, against an up-and-comer who had a good win over Judd Trump," said Carter afterwards.

Facing O'Sullivan, the world number 104 Chang made five half-century breaks as he took a 5–2 lead. O'Sullivan made a 103 century to win the eighth frame and also took the ninth. Chang had a match-winning opportunity in frame 10 but missed the penultimate red, and O'Sullivan cleared to tie the scores at 5–5. O'Sullivan won the decider with a 125 century to reach the 148th ranking quarter-final of his career. "I lost my confidence and lost my swagger and that's something you can't fake," commented O'Sullivan on his recent struggles for form. "I just don't have that enough now. I wish I could turn the clock back and appreciate it more." Wilson made five half-century breaks as he defeated Si 6–3. Wakelin won three of the first four frames against Zhao, but then lost four frames in a row to trail 3–5. However, Wakelin took the last three frames for a 6–5 victory. Hawkins also trailed Ding 3–5 but made breaks of 99 and 84 to tie the scores and then won the match in a deciding frame.

=== Quarter-finals ===
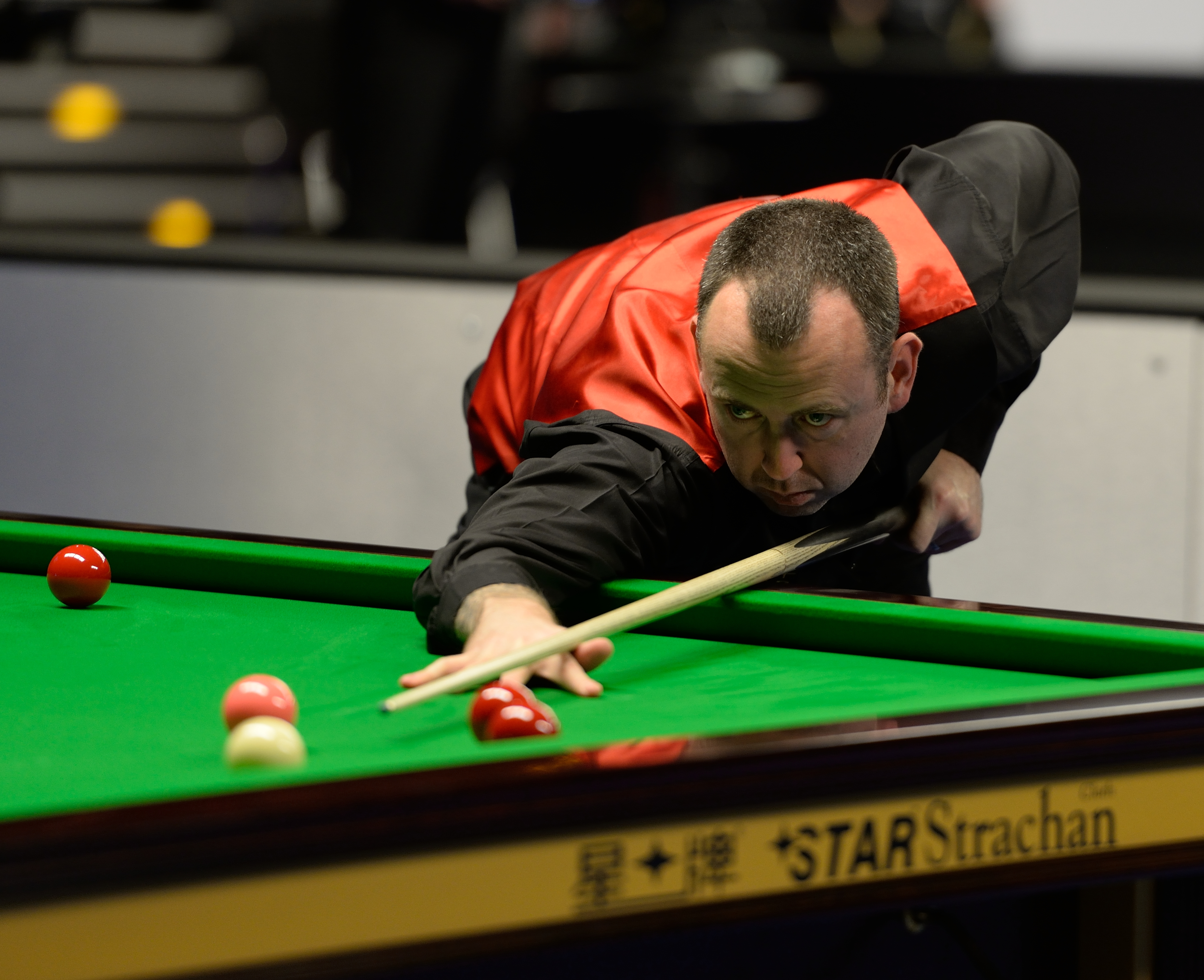
The previous year's runner-up Mark Williams (pictured in 2015) lost 5–6 to Elliot Slessor at the quarter-final stage.

The quarter-finals were played on 14 August as the best of 11 frames. Facing Williams, Slessor made breaks including 62, 130, and 70 as he moved 5–2 ahead. Williams won frame eight with a 74 break. Slessor had a match-winning chance in the ninth but missed a red while on a break of 60, and Williams recovered to take the frame on the last black. Williams made a 51 break in the tenth frame to tie the scores at 5–5. The decider came down to the colours. After Williams went in-off while playing a safety shot, Slessor potted yellow, green, and brown to win a fourth consecutive match in a deciding frame, following his 5–4 victories over Lan and Higgins and his 6–5 win over Bingham. He reached the fifth ranking semi-final of his career. "It's definitely a match I would have lost from that position three or four months ago," commented Slessor afterwards.

Playing Carter, Robertson made a 139 century as he took a 4–2 lead. Carter won frame seven with an 80 break and came from 46 points behind to take the eighth on the last black, tying the scores at 4–4. However, Robertson won the ninth with a 71 break and also took the tenth for a 6–4 victory, securing his 54th ranking semi-final appearance. Robertson afterwards attributed his improved for to his work with a psychologist and with fellow professional player Joe Perry. "I felt it was a matter of time before things would turn around," he said.

O'Sullivan lost the first frame against Wilson but made breaks of 88 and 116 as he took a 2–1 lead. Wilson responded with breaks of 75 and 67 to move 3–2 ahead, but O'Sullivan tied the scores at 3–3 after Wilson missed the penultimate red in frame six. Wilson produced half-centuries of 69 and 80 to lead 5–3, but O'Sullivan made back-to-back centuries of 110 and 118 to tie the scores. After Wilson missed a pot on the pink in the decider, O'Sullivan made a 46 break and went on to secure the frame, reaching his 95th ranking semi-final. "It was a tough match. I had to rely on [Wilson] to make a few mistakes," said O'Sullivan afterwards. In his match against Hawkins, Wakelin made four half-centuries as he took a 4–1 lead, but Hawkins tied the scores at 4–4 and 5–5. Wakelin made a 55 break in the decider and went on to secure victory, reaching his fifth ranking semi-final. "It was very difficult. [Hawkins] is one of the toughest players on the tour, so I'm thrilled to come through 6–5," said Wakelin afterwards.

=== Semi-finals ===
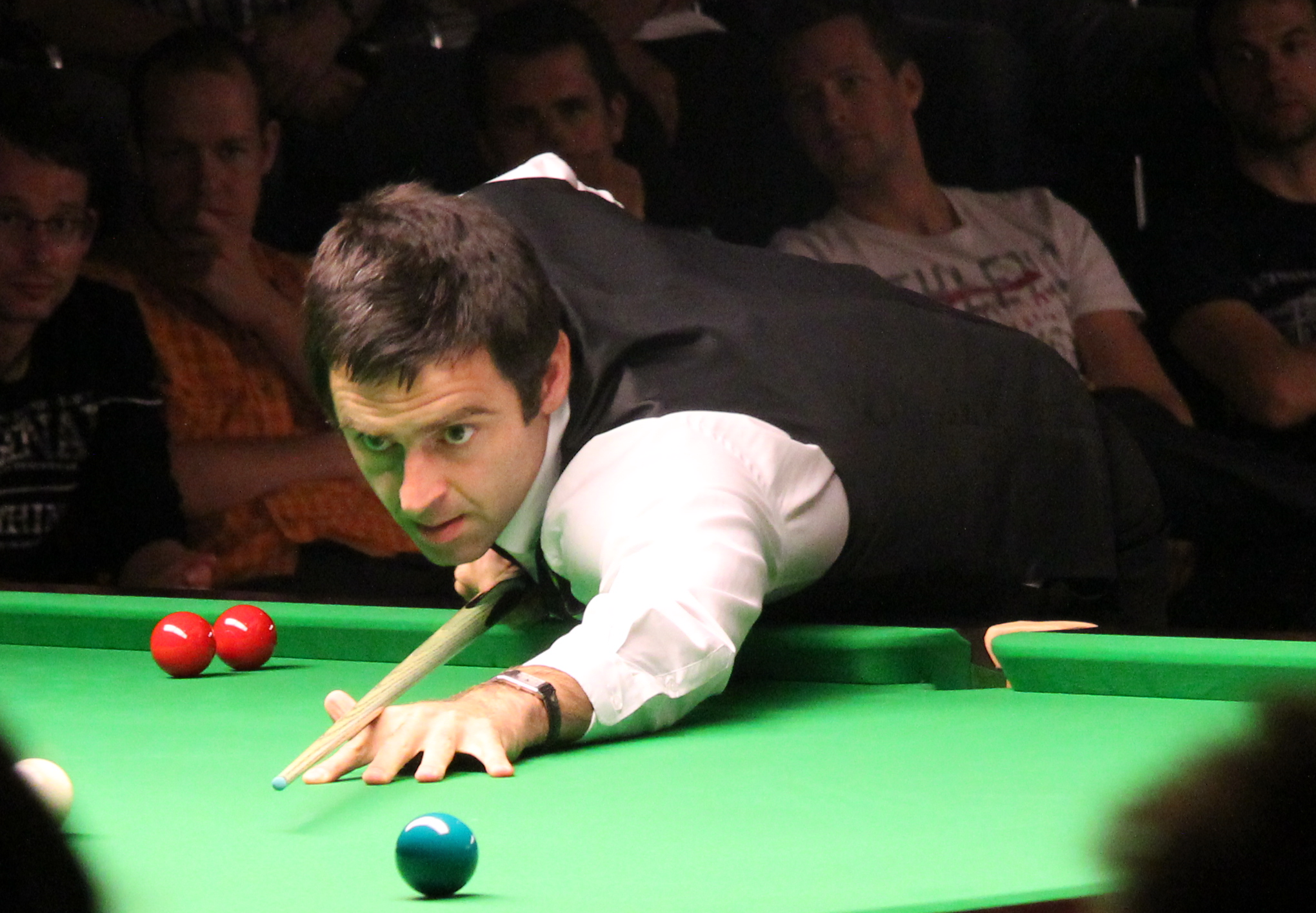
Ronnie O'Sullivan (pictured in 2011) made two maximum breaks in the same match, the 16th and 17th of his career, and won a £147,000 bonus. He became the oldest player to make an official maximum.

The semi-finals were played on 15 August as the best of 11 frames. Facing Slessor in the first semi-final, Robertson won the first two frames. Slessor took the third with a 92 break, but Robertson responded with a 93 break in the fourth to move 3–1 in front at the mid-session interval. Robertson also took frame five, extending his lead to 4–1, but Slessor won frame six and established a 31-point lead in frame seven before he lost position. With two reds remaining, Slessor left a scoring opportunity while escaping from a snooker, and Robertson won the frame to move 5–2 ahead. Slessor took frame eight with a 64 break, but Robertson made a 93 break in the ninth to secure a 6–3 victory. "The start was crucial today. I could see [Slessor] was a bit nervous and I was able to use my experience," said Robertson afterwards. "The clearance to go 5–2 ahead was the killer blow. After that I was just looking for one chance." Defeat for Slessor meant that he had lost all five ranking semi-finals he had contested. Despite winning his largest ever prize of £100,000 and advancing from 29th to 23rd in the world rankings, he said he was "devastated" and stated: "It makes me question whether I will ever be a winner."

Facing Wakelin in the second semi-final, O'Sullivan made a maximum break in the opening frame, the 16th of his professional career and his first in almost seven years, following his 15th official 147 at the 2018 English Open. O'Sullivan then made another total clearance of 142 to win the second frame. Wakelin won frame three with a 70 break, but O'Sullivan took frame four, also with a 70 break, to lead 3–1 at the mid-session interval. Wakelin won the fifth frame with a 125 century and also took the sixth to tie the scores at 3–3. In frame seven, O'Sullivan made his second maximum break of the match and the 17th of his career. He became the second player, after Page in the 2025 World Championship qualifiers, to make two maximums in the same match and the first player to make two maximums in the same session or on the same day. O'Sullivan's maximums were the fourth and fifth of the season and the 221st and 222nd official maximums in professional competition. Aged 49 years and 253 days, he became the oldest player to record an official maximum. O'Sullivan won two-thirds of the tournament's £50,000 maximum break prize—the other third going to Un-Nooh for his maximum in the third round—plus a £147,000 bonus for making two maximums across that season's four eligible tournaments, for a total of £180,333. O'Sullivan took the eighth frame with breaks of 67 and 50 before completing a 6–3 victory with a 134 break, his fourth century of the match.

"It's crazy really, I have never played that well in a match before," said O'Sullivan. "I felt that focus last night against [Wilson] and I tried to take the same attitude into tonight." Wakelin, like Slessor, earned his biggest ever prize of £100,000 and advanced from 16th to 13th in the world rankings following the event. He said afterwards: "I was just dominated from the first ball. [O'Sullivan] was incredible." Tatiana Woollaston, who refereed the match, said she had been "incredibly lucky and privileged" to have officiated O'Sullivan's maximum breaks, adding that she and Wakelin had "shared a few glances at the table in appreciation of what we were witnessing." Other players praised O'Sullivan's achievement on social media.

=== Final ===
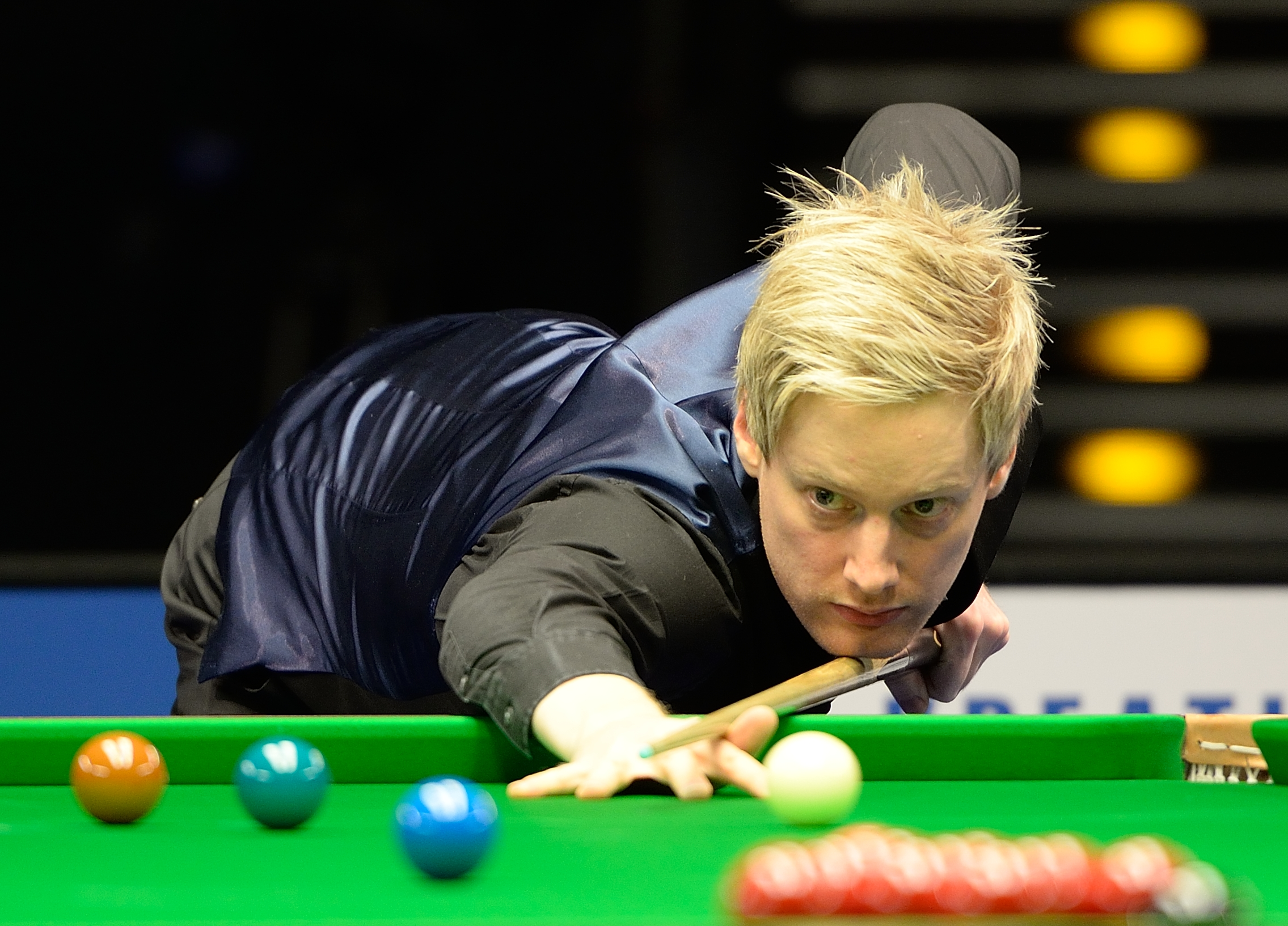
Neil Robertson (pictured in 2015) defeated Ronnie O'Sullivan 10–9 in the final to claim his 26th ranking title and advance from eighth to third in the world rankings.

The final was played on 16 August as the best of 19 frames, held over two sessions, between the world number five O'Sullivan and the world number eight Robertson. O'Sullivan contested his 65th ranking final, while Robertson played in his 39th. O'Sullivan had won 19 of their 31 previous meetings. Julian Bell, who had officiated on the World Snooker Tour since 2018, refereed his first ranking event final. Robertson won the opening frame with a 76 break. O'Sullivan took the second with a 92 break, but Robertson responded with breaks of 108 and 81 to lead 3–1 at the mid-session interval. O'Sullivan won frame five with a 67 break, but Robertson took the sixth with breaks of 41 and 34. In the seventh frame, Robertson made a 39 break after a safety error from O'Sullivan; he later made a plant and compiled a frame-winning break of 40. In the eighth, O'Sullivan was on a break of 24 when he missed a cut on the blue to the middle pocket. Robertson took the frame with a 61 break to end the first session with a 6–2 lead.

When play resumed, Robertson took frame nine with a 97 break to lead by five at 7–2, but O'Sullivan won the 10th with a 139 total clearance, the 1,300th century break of his professional career, and then made breaks of 97, 89, 57, and 80 to tie the scores at 7–7. Robertson made a 75 break in the 15th to regain the lead at 8–7. O'Sullivan won the 16th frame on the colours after laying a snooker on the brown and also took the 17th with a 64 break for a 9–8 advantage. Having lost seven of the last eight frames, Robertson made a 101 century in frame 18 to tie the scores at 9–9, meaning that the final of the event went to a deciding frame for a second consecutive year. O'Sullivan made a 31 break in the decider but failed to split the pack; he subsequently made a safety error, and Robertson won the frame and tournament with an 87 clearance. It was Robertson's 26th career ranking title. His winner's prize of £500,000 took him from eighth to third in the world rankings, while O'Sullivan as runner-up received £200,000 and advanced from fifth to fourth in the rankings. "This surpasses winning the World Championship," said Robertson afterwards. "I have had to answer a lot of questions like whether I can still beat someone like [O'Sullivan] in a final of this magnitude." O'Sullivan commented: "[Robertson] deserved to win. He was the better player. I just tried to hang on to him and make a game of it."

== Final rounds ==
The draw for the final rounds is shown below. Numbers in parentheses after the players' names denote the players' seeding. Players in bold denote match winners.

**Round 5 (Last 32)**; Best of 9 frames
Judd Trump (ENG) (1)	3
**Oliver Lines (ENG) (64)**	**5**
**Ali Carter (ENG) (16)**	**5**
Gary Wilson (ENG) (17)	4
**Neil Robertson (AUS) (9)**	**5**
Ben Woollaston (ENG) (41)	2
**Mark Selby (ENG) (8)**	**5**
Long Zehuang (CHN) (57)	3
John Higgins (SCO) (5)	4
**Elliot Slessor (ENG) (28)**	**5**
Zhang Anda (CHN) (12)	2
**Stuart Bingham (ENG) (21)**	**5**
**Shaun Murphy (ENG) (13)**	**5**
Thepchaiya Un-Nooh (THA) (45)	1
**Mark Williams (WAL) (4)**	**5**
Yuan Sijun (CHN) (29)	3
**Kyren Wilson (ENG) (3)**	**5**
Iulian Boiko (UKR) (104)	4
**Si Jiahui (CHN) (14)**	**5**
Wu Yize (CHN) (19)	3
Mark Allen (NIR) (11)	4
**Chang Bingyu (CHN) (114)**	**5**
**Ronnie O'Sullivan (ENG) (6)**	**5**
Joe O'Connor (ENG) (27)	0
**Ding Junhui (CHN) (7)**	**5**
Stephen Maguire (SCO) (26)	2
**Barry Hawkins (ENG) (10)**	**5**
Martin O'Donnell (ENG) (42)	3
**Chris Wakelin (ENG) (15)**	**5**
Farakh Ajaib (PAK) (82)	1
**Zhao Xintong (CHN) (2)**	**5**
Steven Hallworth (ENG) (100)	0

**Round 6 (Last 16)**; Best of 11 frames
(England) Oliver Lines (64)	3
**(England) Ali Carter (16)**	**6**
**(Australia) Neil Robertson (9)**	**6**
(England) Mark Selby (8)	4
**(England) Elliot Slessor (28)**	**6**
(England) Stuart Bingham (21)	5
(England) Shaun Murphy (13)	1
**(Wales) Mark Williams (4)**	**6**
**(England) Kyren Wilson (3)**	**6**
(China) Si Jiahui (14)	3
(China) Chang Bingyu (114)	5
**(England) Ronnie O'Sullivan (6)**	**6**
(China) Ding Junhui (7)	5
**(England) Barry Hawkins (10)**	**6**
**(England) Chris Wakelin (15)**	**6**
(China) Zhao Xintong (2)	5

**Quarter-finals**; Best of 11 frames
(England) Ali Carter (16)	4
**(Australia) Neil Robertson (9)**	**6**
**(England) Elliot Slessor (28)**	**6**
(Wales) Mark Williams (4)	5
(England) Kyren Wilson (3)	5
**(England) Ronnie O'Sullivan (6)**	**6**
(England) Barry Hawkins (10)	5
**(England) Chris Wakelin (15)**	**6**

**Semi-finals**; Best of 11 frames
**(Australia) Neil Robertson (9)**	**6**
(England) Elliot Slessor (28)	3
**(England) Ronnie O'Sullivan (6)**	**6**
(England) Chris Wakelin (15)	3

**Final**; Best of 19 frames
**(Australia) Neil Robertson (9)**	**10**
(England) Ronnie O'Sullivan (6)	9

== Early rounds ==
The results of the early rounds are shown below. Numbers in parentheses after the players' names denote the players' seeding, an "a" indicates amateur players who were not on the main World Snooker Tour. Players in bold denote match winners.

**Round 1 (Last 144)**; Best of 7 frames
Florian Nüßle (AUT) (103)	3
**Dylan Emery (WAL) (105)**	**4**
**Liam Pullen (ENG) (108)**	**4**
Ahmed Aseeri (KSA) (a)	1
Robbie McGuigan (NIR) (81)	1
**Gao Yang (CHN) (117)**	**4**
**Leone Crowley (IRL) (109)**	**4**
Ziyad Alqabbani (KSA) (a)	2
**Chatchapong Nasa (THA) (119)**	**4**
Fahad Alghamdi (KSA) (a)	0
Kreishh Gurbaxani (IND) (87)	2
**Reanne Evans (ENG) (98)**	**4**
**Zhao Hanyang (CHN) (112)**	**4**
Musab Sayegh (KSA) (a)	0
**Jonas Luz (BRA) (88)**	**4**
Musaad Almisfir (KSA) (a)	3
**Ross Muir (SCO) (101)**	**4**
Abdulraouf Saigh (KSA) (a)	0
Mateusz Baranowski (POL) (110)	1
**Lan Yuhao (CHN) (123)**	**4**
**Michał Szubarczyk (POL) (121)**	**4**
Ryan Davies (ENG) (a)	2
**Sam Craigie (ENG) (96)**	**4**
Xu Yichen (CHN) (115)	2
**Sahil Nayyar (CAN) (122)**	**4**
Habib Subah Humood (BHR) (a)	1
**Huang Jiahao (CHN) (84)**	**4**
Abdullah Alshammari (KSA) (a)	1
**Liam Highfield (ENG) (93)**	**4**
Mohammed Al Joker (UAE) (a)	0
Jiang Jun (CHN) (107)	2
**Hesham Shawky (EGY) (a)**	**4**
**Louis Heathcote (ENG) (102)**	**4**
Ayman Alamri (KSA) (a)	0
**Iulian Boiko (UKR) (104)**	**4**
Liu Wenwei (CHN) (120)	2
Mitchell Mann (ENG) (83)	1
**Ashley Hugill (ENG) (a)**	**4**
Ian Burns (ENG) (95)	2
**David Grace (ENG) (94)**	**4**
**Chang Bingyu (CHN) (114)**	**4**
Marco Fu (HKG) (91)	3
**Ken Doherty (IRL) (85)**	**4**
Jimmy White (ENG) (92)	1
**Connor Benzey (ENG) (118)**	**4**
Adeel Aqdus (PAK) (a)	0
**Hatem Yassen (EGY) (89)**	**4**
Ng On-yee (HKG) (113)	3
**Mohammed Shehab (UAE) (90)**	**4**
Abdullah Alotayyani (KSA) (a)	2
**Oliver Brown (ENG) (97)**	**4**
Patrick Whelan (ENG) (a)	2
Mink Nutcharut (THA) (86)	1
**Umut Dikme (GER) (a)**	**4**
Yao Pengcheng (CHN) (111)	3
**Alexander Ursenbacher (SUI) (99)**	**4**
**Fergal Quinn (NIR) (116)**	**4**
Mahmoud El Hareedy (EGY) (124)	2
**Farakh Ajaib (PAK) (82)**	**4**
Saud Albaker (KSA) (a)	0
**Steven Hallworth (ENG) (100)**	**4**
Omar Alajlani (KSA) (a)	0
**Liam Graham (SCO) (106)**	**4**
Asif Mukhtar (PAK) (a)	0

**Round 2 (Last 112)**; Best of 7 frames
**Gong Chenzhi (CHN) (65)**	**4**
Dylan Emery (WAL) (105)	2
**Oliver Lines (ENG) (64)**	**4**
Liam Pullen (ENG) (108)	1
Chris Totten (SCO) (80)	0
**Gao Yang (CHN) (117)**	**4**
**Aaron Hill (IRL) (49)**	**4**
Leone Crowley (IRL) (109)	1
David Lilley (ENG) (56)	3
**Chatchapong Nasa (THA) (119)**	**4**
Liam Davies (WAL) (73)	2
**Reanne Evans (ENG) (98)**	**4**
**Long Zehuang (CHN) (57)**	**4**
Zhao Hanyang (CHN) (112)	3
**Amir Sarkhosh (IRN) (72)**	**4**
Jonas Luz (BRA) (88)	0
**Ben Mertens (BEL) (69)**	**4**
Ross Muir (SCO) (101)	3
Ishpreet Singh Chadha (IND) (60)	1
**Lan Yuhao (CHN) (123)**	**4**
Bulcsú Révész (HUN) (76)	3
**Michał Szubarczyk (POL) (121)**	**4**
Mark Davis (ENG) (53)	0
**Sam Craigie (ENG) (96)**	**4**
**Jordan Brown (NIR) (52)**	**4**
Sahil Nayyar (CAN) (122)	1
Cheung Ka Wai (HKG) (77)	1
**Huang Jiahao (CHN) (84)**	**4**
**Stan Moody (ENG) (61)**	**4**
Liam Highfield (ENG) (93)	3
**Antoni Kowalski (POL) (68)**	**4**
Hesham Shawky (EGY) (a)	2
Sunny Akani (THA) (67)	0
**Louis Heathcote (ENG) (102)**	**4**
Zak Surety (ENG) (62)	1
**Iulian Boiko (UKR) (104)**	**4**
Haydon Pinhey (ENG) (78)	0
**Ashley Hugill (ENG) (a)**	**4**
**Matthew Stevens (WAL) (51)**	**4**
David Grace (ENG) (94)	1
Scott Donaldson (SCO) (54)	3
**Chang Bingyu (CHN) (114)**	**4**
**Artemijs Žižins (LAT) (75)**	**4**
Ken Doherty (IRL) (85)	3
**Sanderson Lam (ENG) (59)**	**4**
Connor Benzey (ENG) (118)	0
**Wang Yuchen (HKG) (70)**	**4**
Hatem Yassen (EGY) (89)	0
**Allan Taylor (ENG) (71)**	**4**
Mohammed Shehab (UAE) (90)	3
**Anthony McGill (SCO) (58)**	**4**
Oliver Brown (ENG) (97)	1
**Julien Leclercq (BEL) (74)**	**4**
Umut Dikme (GER) (a)	1
**Liu Hongyu (CHN) (55)**	**4**
Alexander Ursenbacher (SUI) (99)	1
**Jamie Jones (WAL) (50)**	**4**
Fergal Quinn (NIR) (116)	2
Haris Tahir (PAK) (79)	0
**Farakh Ajaib (PAK) (82)**	**4**
Michael Holt (ENG) (63)	3
**Steven Hallworth (ENG) (100)**	**4**
**Duane Jones (WAL) (66)**	**4**
Liam Graham (SCO) (106)	0

**Round 3 (Last 80)**; Best of 7 frames
**Noppon Saengkham (THA) (32)**	**4**
Gong Chenzhi (CHN) (65)	3
Matthew Selt (ENG) (33)	3
**Oliver Lines (ENG) (64)**	**4**
**Gary Wilson (ENG) (17)**	**4**
Gao Yang (CHN) (117)	3
Robert Milkins (ENG) (48)	3
**Aaron Hill (IRL) (49)**	**4**
**Ben Woollaston (ENG) (41)**	**4**
Chatchapong Nasa (THA) (119)	1
**Jack Lisowski (ENG) (24)**	**4**
Reanne Evans (ENG) (98)	0
Xu Si (CHN) (40)	0
**Long Zehuang (CHN) (57)**	**4**
**Pang Junxu (CHN) (25)**	**4**
Amir Sarkhosh (IRN) (72)	2
**Elliot Slessor (ENG) (28)**	**4**
Ben Mertens (BEL) (69)	1
Lyu Haotian (CHN) (37)	0
**Lan Yuhao (CHN) (123)**	**4**
**Stuart Bingham (ENG) (21)**	**4**
Michał Szubarczyk (POL) (121)	1
He Guoqiang (CHN) (44)	1
**Sam Craigie (ENG) (96)**	**4**
**Thepchaiya Un-Nooh (THA) (45)**	**4**
Jordan Brown (NIR) (52)	0
**Jak Jones (WAL) (20)**	**4**
Huang Jiahao (CHN) (84)	1
Ryan Day (WAL) (36)	2
**Stan Moody (ENG) (61)**	**4**
**Yuan Sijun (CHN) (29)**	**4**
Antoni Kowalski (POL) (68)	1
Lei Peifan (CHN) (30)	0
**Louis Heathcote (ENG) (102)**	**4**
Jackson Page (WAL) (35)	2
**Iulian Boiko (UKR) (104)**	**4**
**Wu Yize (CHN) (19)**	**4**
Ashley Hugill (ENG) (a)	1
Robbie Williams (ENG) (46)	1
**Matthew Stevens (WAL) (51)**	**4**
Daniel Wells (WAL) (43)	3
**Chang Bingyu (CHN) (114)**	**4**
**David Gilbert (ENG) (22)**	**4**
Artemijs Žižins (LAT) (75)	2
Luca Brecel (BEL) (38) (Note: Luca Brecel withdrew for medical reasons and so Sanderson Lam received a walkover.)	w/d
**Sanderson Lam** (ENG) (59)	**w/o**
**Joe O'Connor (ENG) (27)**	**4**
Wang Yuchen (HKG) (70)	3
**Stephen Maguire (SCO) (26)**	**4**
Allan Taylor (ENG) (71)	3
Ricky Walden (ENG) (39)	2
**Anthony McGill (SCO) (58)**	**4**
**Hossein Vafaei (IRN) (23)**	**4**
Julien Leclercq (BEL) (74)	1
**Martin O'Donnell (ENG) (42)**	**4**
Liu Hongyu (CHN) (55)	3
Fan Zhengyi (CHN) (47)	3
**Jamie Jones (WAL) (50)**	**4**
Tom Ford (ENG) (18)	2
**Farakh Ajaib (PAK) (82)**	**4**
Jimmy Robertson (ENG) (34)	3
**Steven Hallworth (ENG) (100)**	**4**
**Zhou Yuelong (CHN) (31)**	**4**
Duane Jones (WAL) (66)	1

**Round 4 (Last 48)**; Best of 9 frames
Noppon Saengkham (THA) (32)	2
**Oliver Lines (ENG) (64)**	**5**
**Gary Wilson (ENG) (17)**	**5**
Aaron Hill (IRL) (49)	2
**Ben Woollaston (ENG) (41)**	**5**
Jack Lisowski (ENG) (24)	4
**Long Zehuang (CHN) (57)**	**5**
Pang Junxu (CHN) (25)	3
**Elliot Slessor (ENG) (28)**	**5**
Lan Yuhao (CHN) (123)	4
**Stuart Bingham (ENG) (21)**	**5**
Sam Craigie (ENG) (96)	4
**Thepchaiya Un-Nooh (THA) (45)**	**5**
Jak Jones (WAL) (20)	1
Stan Moody (ENG) (61)	0
**Yuan Sijun (CHN) (29)**	**5**
Louis Heathcote (ENG) (102)	4
**Iulian Boiko (UKR) (104)**	**5**
**Wu Yize (CHN) (19)**	**5**
Matthew Stevens (WAL) (51)	1
**Chang Bingyu (CHN) (114)**	**5**
David Gilbert (ENG) (22)	3
Sanderson Lam (ENG) (59)	0
**Joe O'Connor (ENG) (27)**	**5**
**Stephen Maguire (SCO) (26)**	**5**
Anthony McGill (SCO) (58)	0
Hossein Vafaei (IRN) (23)	3
**Martin O'Donnell (ENG) (42)**	**5**
Jamie Jones (WAL) (50)	2
**Farakh Ajaib (PAK) (82)**	**5**
**Steven Hallworth (ENG) (100)**	**5**
Zhou Yuelong (CHN) (31)	3

Note: w/d=withdrawn; w/o=walkover

== Final: frame scores ==
Final: Best of 19 frames. Referee: Julian Bell; Prince Abdullah Al-Faisal Sports City, Jeddah, Saudi Arabia, 16 August 2025
Neil Robertson (9); Australia	10–9	Ronnie O'Sullivan (6); England
Afternoon: 105–0, 0–92, 108–4 (108), 81–0, 5–75, 75–7, 80–8, 61–24; Evening: 97–40, 0–139 (139), 1–97, 0–89, 1–104, 40–80, 75–0, 46–62, 31–85, 101–16 (101), 91–39
(frame 3) 108	Highest break	139 (frame 10)
2	Century breaks	1

== Century breaks ==
A total of 91 century breaks were made during the tournament.

- 147, 147, 142, 139, 134, 125, 118, 116, 116, 110, 103 – Ronnie O'Sullivan
- 147, 110, 103 – Thepchaiya Un-Nooh
- 142, 130, 109 – Stan Moody
- 139, 137, 120, 114, 111, 108, 106, 101 – Neil Robertson
- 137 – Jak Jones
- 135 – Hossein Vafaei
- 132, 116 – Ali Carter
- 132, 106 – Zhao Xintong
- 131, 103 – Farakh Ajaib
- 131 – Long Zehuang
- 131 – Daniel Wells
- 130, 101 – Elliot Slessor
- 129, 128, 101 – Stephen Maguire
- 129 – Florian Nüßle
- 128, 119, 100 – Chang Bingyu
- 128 – Si Jiahui
- 127, 101 – Yuan Sijun
- 127 – Ricky Walden
- 125, 118 – Shaun Murphy
- 125, 116, 106, 100 – Oliver Lines
- 125, 106, 102 – Chris Wakelin
- 124, 105, 105 – Wu Yize
- 123 – Sanderson Lam
- 122, 104 – Sam Craigie
- 122 – Liam Highfield
- 120 – Aaron Hill
- 119 – Martin O'Donnell
- 119 – Mark Selby
- 116 – Liu Hongyu
- 114, 104 – Louis Heathcote
- 113 – Ian Burns
- 113 – Ding Junhui
- 112, 107 – Joe O'Connor
- 112, 103 – Steven Hallworth
- 111, 108 – Anthony McGill
- 109 – Ben Mertens
- 106 – Jiang Jun
- 104 – Chatchapong Nasa
- 103 – Hatem Yassen
- 102 – Mark Allen
- 102 – Gao Yang
- 102 – Judd Trump
- 102 – Mark Williams
- 100 – Jordan Brown
- 100 – Dylan Emery
- 100 – Barry Hawkins
- 100 – Matthew Stevens
- 100 – Alexander Ursenbacher
