= 1984 UK Championship =

1984 Coral UK Championship
Tournament information
- Dates: 18 November – 2 December 1984
- Venue: Preston Guild Hall
- City: Preston
- Country: England
- Organisation: WPBSA
- Format: Ranking event
- Total prize fund: £101,000
- Winner's share: £20,000
- Highest break: Jack McLaughlin (NIR) (135)

Final
- Champion: Steve Davis (ENG)
- Runner-up: Alex Higgins (NIR)
- Score: 16–8

The 1984 UK Championship (officially the 1984 Coral UK Championship) was a ranking professional snooker tournament that took place at the Guild Hall in Preston, England, between 18 November and 2 December 1984. This was the eighth edition of the UK Championship but only the first to be granted ranking status, as it was now open to all professional overseas players as well as those from the UK. The BBC aired the event from the second round onwards with two tables for the coverage up to and including the semi-finals which would remain until 1992. The championship was sponsored by sports betting company Coral.

The defending champion was Alex Higgins who won the 1983 event after defeating Steve Davis 16–15 in the final. The pair met in the final again, with Davis winning 16–8, to win his third UK Championship title. The highest break of the tournament was a 135 made by Jack McLaughlin during the non-televised stages; the highest break of the televised stages was a 134 made by Davis. There was a total prize fund of £101,000 with the winner receiving £20,000.

The final attracted an average of 14.5 million viewers on BBC1, peaking at 15.2 million.

== Prize fund ==
The winner of the event received a total of £20,000. The breakdown of prize money for this year is shown below:

Winner:	£20,000
Highest break (TV):	£2,000
Total:	£101,800

== Main draw ==
The tournament featured 32 players. Players in bold denote match winners.

Round of 32 Best of 17 frames

(Northern Ireland) **Alex Higgins 9**–7 Tony Jones (England)

(Canada) Bill Werbeniuk 1–**9 Rex Williams** (England)

(England) **Willie Thorne 9**–7 John Parrott (England)

(Australia) **Eddie Charlton 9**–4 Silvino Francisco (South Africa)

(Canada) **Cliff Thorburn 9**–4 Jack McLaughlin (Northern Ireland)

(Wales) Terry Griffiths 6–**9 Cliff Wilson** (Wales)

(England) **David Taylor 9**–6 Murdo MacLeod (Scotland)

(Wales) **Ray Reardon 9**–2 Danny Fowler (England)

(Canada) **Kirk Stevens 9**–7 Tony Chappel (Wales)

(England) John Spencer 6–**9 Joe Johnson** (England)

(England) **Tony Knowles 9**–5 Marcel Gauvreau (Canada)

(Northern Ireland) **Dennis Taylor 9**–6 Warren King (Australia)

(England) **Jimmy White 9**–5 John Campbell (Australia)

(Wales) **Doug Mountjoy 9**–2 Mike Hallett (England)

(England) **Steve Davis 9**–1 Tommy Murphy (Northern Ireland)

(England) **Tony Meo 9**–4 Eugene Hughes (Republic of Ireland)

Round of 16
(Northern Ireland) **Alex Higgins**	**9**
(England) Rex Williams	7
(England) **Willie Thorne**	**9**
(Australia) Eddie Charlton	7
(Canada) **Cliff Thorburn**	**9**
(Wales) Cliff Wilson	3
(Wales) **Ray Reardon**	**9**
(England) David Taylor	4
(Canada) **Kirk Stevens**	**9**
(England) Joe Johnson	2
(England) **Tony Knowles**	**9**
(Northern Ireland) Dennis Taylor	2
(England) **Jimmy White**	**9**
(Wales) Doug Mountjoy	2
(England) **Steve Davis**	**9**
(England) Tony Meo	7

Quarter-finals
(Northern Ireland) **Alex Higgins**	**9**
(England) Willie Thorne	5
(Canada) **Cliff Thorburn**	**9**
(Wales) Ray Reardon	8
(Canada) **Kirk Stevens**	**9**
(England) Tony Knowles	7
(England) Jimmy White	4
(England) **Steve Davis**	**9**

Semi-finals
(Northern Ireland) **Alex Higgins**	**9**
(Canada) Cliff Thorburn	7
(Canada) Kirk Stevens	2
(England) **Steve Davis**	**9**

Final
(Northern Ireland) Alex Higgins	8
(England) **Steve Davis**	**16**

== Final ==
Final: Best of 31 frames. Referee: Jim Thorpe; The Guild Hall, Preston, England, 1 and 2 December 1984.
Steve Davis; England	16–8	Alex Higgins; Northern Ireland
First session: 116–6, 89–30, 94–23, 95–0, 72–25, 70–75, 130–10 (106); Second session: 5–83, 124–1 (120), 110–0, 24–66, 0–124 (124), 65–60, 51–79; Third session: 22–116, 28–80, 9–107, 104–8, 84–11, 123–1, 91–24; Fourth session: 110–32, 105–27, 65–40
120	Highest break	124
2	Century breaks	1

== Century breaks ==
A total of 28 century breaks were made during the tournament.

- 135 – Jack McLaughlin
- 134, 120, 108, 106 – Steve Davis
- 132, 125 – Cliff Thorburn
- 129, 124, 100 – Alex Higgins
- 121 – Eddie Sinclair
- 119, 114, 102 – Tony Chappel
- 119 – Willie Thorne
- 113, 100 – Tony Jones
- 111 – Peter Francisco
- 111 – Tony Meo
- 110 – Malcolm Bradley
- 108 – Steve Newbury
- 107 – Tony Knowles
- 105 – Jimmy White
- 102 – Eddie Charlton
- 101 – John Parrott
- 100 – Paddy Browne
- 100 – Robby Foldvari
- 100 – Cliff Wilson
