= John Parrott =

English snooker player (born 1964)

John Parrott MBE
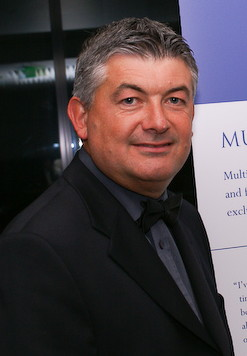
- Parrott in October 2008

Personal information
- Nicknames: The Entertainer; Mr. JP
- Born: 11 May 1964 (age 62) Liverpool, England

Sport
- Country: England
- Sport: Snooker
- Professional: 1983–2010
- Highest ranking: 2 (1989/90, 1992/93–1993/94)
- Maximum breaks: 1
- Century breaks: 221

Tournament wins
- Ranking: 9
- World Championship: 1991

John Stephen Parrott (born 11 May 1964) is an English former professional snooker player, who won the 1991 World Snooker Championship. He rose to prominence in the mid to late 1980s and remained within the top 16 of the world rankings for fourteen consecutive seasons.

He twice reached the final of the World Snooker Championship. In 1989, he lost 3‍–‍18 to Steve Davis, the heaviest defeat in a world championship final in modern times. In 1991, he beat Jimmy White 18‍–‍11 to claim his first, and only, world title. Later the same year, he defeated White again to win the 1991 UK Championship title. This made Parrott the third player ever to win both championships in the same calendar year (after Steve Davis and Stephen Hendry); he is still one of only six players to have achieved this feat. The following year, he lost to White in the final of the 1992 UK Championship. Parrott reached the final of the Masters on three occasions, losing to Hendry each time.

He reached his highest position of second in the world rankings in 1989‍–‍90, 1992‍–‍93, and 1993‍–‍94. He is one of several players to have achieved more than 200 competitive century breaks during his career, with 221. Following his playing career, Parrott became a commentator and pundit for the BBC. In addition, he was a regular team captain on the BBC quiz show A Question of Sport.

== Early life and career ==
John Parrott was born on 11 May 1964 at the Oxford Street Maternity Hospital, Liverpool. Parrott grew up with his aunt and uncle following a split between his parents when he was 4. He was a keen bowls player until the age of 12, as he was first introduced to snooker by his father. "I used to play crown green bowls with my dad but one day it was pouring with rain, so we went for a game of snooker. I was only twelve but after that I played snooker every night" Parrott said about his career starting. He lost in the final of the British Under-16s Championship in 1979 and then again in 1980. The next year, he won the 1981 Pontins Junior Championship. In 1982, he won the Pontins Open, a tournament with over 1,000 entrants. The same year, he also won the 1982 Junior Pot Black championship. He turned professional in 1983 after winning 14 tournaments in his last year as an amateur player, including the 1983 Junior Pot Black title, and finishing as runner-up in the English Amateur Championship.

== Professional career ==
=== World championship win (1983–1991) ===
Parrott turned professional in 1983, aged 19, making his televised debut as a professional during the last 16 of the 1984 Classic. In the match, he defeated Alex Higgins 5–2. He then beat Tony Knowles in the next round before losing to Steve Davis in the semi-finals on a deciding frame. Parrott qualified for the World Snooker Championship on his first attempt, losing only five frames in qualification for the 1984 World Snooker Championship. He defeated Knowles, but lost in the quarter-finals to Dennis Taylor. He finished his first professional season ranked 20th in the world. In 1987, Parrott was placed within the top 16 in the world for the first time.

At the 1988 Classic, Parrott reached his first ranking event final. Despite leading 11‍–‍10, he lost 11‍–‍13 to Davis. The following season, Parrott was runner-up in a number of professional events. He lost again to Davis in the final of the 1988 World Matchplay and second to him at the 1989 Matchroom League, to Stephen Hendry in the final of the invitational 1989 Masters and 1989 London Masters, and to Mike Hallett at the 1989 English Professional Championship. He also reached the final to play Davis at the 1989 World Snooker Championship. In the first to 18 match, Parrott trailed 2‍–‍5, but won only one more frame in the match, losing 3‍–‍18. The loss was the largest in any World Championship final. With the match finishing early, Parrott had to play an exhibition match in place of the final session. Parrott finished the season at his highest placement in the snooker world rankings, second in the world, only behind Davis.

Parrott won his first ranking title at the 1989 European Open, defeating Terry Griffiths in the final 9‍–‍8. He successfully defended his title at the 1990 event, defeating Hendry 10‍–‍6 in the final. Parrott reached the final of the 1990 Masters for a second time, losing again to Hendry. He finished the season at the 1990 World Snooker Championship losing in the semi-final 11‍–‍16 to Hendry.

Parrott reached the final of the World Championship again in 1991. Defeating Nigel Gilbert, Knowles, Griffiths and Davis, he played Jimmy White in the final. He took a 7‍–‍0 lead, winning the match 18‍–‍11. Parrott's first session was described by commentator Ted Lowe as "the finest session by one player" he had ever seen. Following the World Championship win, the following season, Parrott won the 1991 Dubai Classic over Knowles 9‍–‍3. He also won his second Triple Crown event - the 1991 UK Championship. After defeating David McDonnell, Willie Thorne, Dean Reynolds and James Wattana, he met White in the final, defeating him 16‍–‍13. He was just the third person to win hold both the UK and World Championships sequentially. Parrott finished the 1991‍–‍92 season once again second in the world rankings.

=== Later career (1992–2000) ===
In 1992, Parrott reached four major finals. He retained the Dubai Classic, defeating Hendry on a deciding frame, but lost both the UK Championship and Masters to White and Hendry, respectively. This was the last time Parrott reached the final of the Masters. Having won both the UK and World Championships, he was unable to complete the Triple Crown during his career. Parrott also reached the final of the 1992 Strachan Open losing to James Wattana. He finished the season again in second in the world rankings for the third and final time. At the 1992 World Snooker Championship, he was the first player to conduct a "whitewash" in the final stages of the World Championship at the Crucible, when he defeated Eddie Charlton 10–0 in the first round. For 27 years, he held the record for being the only player ever to achieve this, until Shaun Murphy defeated China's Luo Honghao 10–0 in the first round of the 2019 World Championship. In defence of his World Championship, Parrott reached the quarter-final, losing to Alan McManus 12–13.

The following season, Parrott won the 1994 International Open, defeating Wattana in the final. Later in 1994, he reached the final of the European Open for the third time, this time losing to Hendry. The following season, Parrott won the 1995 Thailand Classic for the third time, defeating Nigel Bond in the final. Parrott reached the final of the European Open for a fourth time, winning the 1996 European Open with a victory in the final over Peter Ebdon. Over the next two seasons, Parrott reached the final of three more rankings events. He lost the 1997 European Open, 1997 German Open finals both to John Higgins and the 1998 Thailand Masters to Hendry. This was the last ranking event final of Parrotts career. He spent 14 consecutive seasons in the top 16 of the snooker world rankings, from 1987 until 2001, 11 of which were in the top 6. He won the non-ranking 1998 German Masters event, defeating Williams in the final 6‍–‍4. Parrott captained an England team at the 2000 Nations Cup made up of O'Sullivan, Stephen Lee and White which won the event, defeating the Welsh team 6‍–‍4.

=== Retirement and legacy ===
At the 2007 World Snooker Championship he reached the last 16 of the World Championship for the first time since 2000, after victories over James Leadbetter, David Gray to qualify, he defeated Steve Davis. He lost to Shaun Murphy in the last 16 and never appeared in the final stages of the event again. Following his 6–10 defeat to young Chinese player Zhang Anda in the qualification for the 2010 event, Parrott finished outside the top 64 in the end of season rankings and was not assured a place on the main tour for the 2010‍–‍11 season. Later Parrott announced he was to retire from the professional game. Parrott finished his career with 221 century breaks.

Following his professional career, Parrott entered the 2011 World Seniors Championship, where he lost in the semi-finals to Davis. He also participated in the preliminary qualifying rounds of the 2012 World Snooker Championship as an amateur losing 0–5 to Patrick Wallace in Round one. He reached the semi-finals of the 2015 World Seniors Championship, losing to professional player Mark Williams 0‍–‍2. He reached the final of the 2017 World Seniors Championship losing 0‍–‍3 to Peter Lines. Parrott retired from the seniors tour after the 2022 World Seniors Championship, with a parade with the World Snooker Championship after the event.

Ronnie O'Sullivan wrote that he considered Parrott to be a "great match player [with] plenty of bottle" that, before the emergence of the "Class of '92", was the only player that would go "toe to toe" with Hendry. In their 2005 book Masters of the Baize, Luke Williams and Paul Gadsby described Parrott as a "solid and belligerent player, with a delightfully smooth cue action". Robert Philip of The Daily Telegraph wrote approvingly in 2007 of how Parrott had prioritised his family above playing, and speculated that had he not done so, Parrott could have won further world championships.

== Television ==
Following his playing career, Parrott became a pundit and commentator on snooker for BBC Sport. From 1996 to 2002, he was one of the team captains on the BBC quiz show A Question of Sport, alongside football player Ally McCoist. As a supporter of horse racing, he was involved in the BBC's horse racing coverage as part of the presenting team.

== Personal life ==
In 1996, Parrott was honoured with an MBE in the Queen's Birthday Honours list, for charitable services in Merseyside. In 2008, he launched John Parrott Cue Sports, an online retailer selling snooker and pool cues and some snooker collectables. This was re-branded John Parrott Sports in 2019. Parrott is a supporter of Everton F.C. and brother-in-law of former Everton player Duncan Ferguson. Parrott was made the Honorary Patron of the British Crown Green Bowling Association in 2010.

== Performance and rankings timeline ==
| Tournament | 1983/ 84 | 1984/ 85 | 1985/ 86 | 1986/ 87 | 1987/ 88 | 1988/ 89 | 1989/ 90 | 1990/ 91 | 1991/ 92 | 1992/ 93 | 1993/ 94 | 1994/ 95 | 1995/ 96 | 1996/ 97 | 1997/ 98 | 1998/ 99 | 1999/ 00 | 2000/ 01 | 2001/ 02 | 2002/ 03 | 2003/ 04 | 2004/ 05 | 2005/ 06 | 2006/ 07 | 2007/ 08 | 2008/ 09 | 2009/ 10 |
|---|---|---|---|---|---|---|---|---|---|---|---|---|---|---|---|---|---|---|---|---|---|---|---|---|---|---|---|
| Ranking (Note: From the 2010/2011 season it shows the ranking at the beginning of the season.) | (Note: New players on the Main Tour do not have a ranking.) | 20 | 18 | 17 | 13 | 7 | 2 | 3 | 4 | 2 | 2 | 5 | 4 | 4 | 6 | 6 | 5 | 10 | 22 | 18 | 30 | 31 | 29 | 42 | 39 | 39 | 53 |
Ranking tournaments
| Shanghai Masters | Tournament Not Held | | | | | | | | | | | | | | | | | | | | | | | | LQ | A | LQ |
| Grand Prix (Note: The event ran under different names as Professional Players Tournament (1983/1984) and the LG Cup (2001/2002–2003/2004)) | 2R | 2R | 1R | 2R | SF | 2R | 3R | QF | 1R | 2R | SF | 1R | 1R | SF | QF | 2R | 2R | 2R | 2R | 1R | SF | 1R | 1R | LQ | LQ | 2R | LQ |
| UK Championship | NR | 1R | 2R | SF | QF | QF | 3R | SF | W | F | SF | QF | 3R | QF | 2R | QF | 2R | 2R | 2R | 1R | 1R | QF | 1R | 1R | LQ | WD | LQ |
| Welsh Open | Tournament Not Held | | | | | | | | SF | QF | 2R | 1R | F | SF | QF | 2R | 1R | 1R | LQ | LQ | 2R | 3R | 1R | 1R | 1R | LQ | LQ |
| China Open (Note: The event ran under different name as China International (1997/1998–1998/1999)) | Tournament Not Held | | | | | | | | | | | | | | NR | QF | 1R | 2R | 1R | Not Held | | LQ | LQ | LQ | LQ | WD | LQ |
| World Championship | 2R | QF | 2R | 2R | 2R | F | SF | W | QF | QF | QF | QF | 1R | QF | QF | QF | 2R | 1R | 1R | 1R | 1R | LQ | 1R | 2R | LQ | LQ | LQ |
Non-ranking tournaments
| Premier League (Note: The event was also called the Professional Snooker League (1983/1984), Matchroom League (1986/1987-1991/1992) and European League (1992/1993-1996/1997) | A | Not Held | | A | A | F | RR | A | RR | SF | F | RR | RR | RR | A | A | A | A | A | A | A | A | A | A | A | A | A |
| The Masters | A | A | A | A | SF | F | F | QF | F | QF | 1R | 1R | QF | QF | 1R | 1R | SF | QF | A | A | A | A | LQ | A | A | A | A |
Former ranking tournaments
| Canadian Masters | Not Held | | Non-Ranking | | | QF | Tournament Not Held | | | | | | | | | | | | | | | | | | | | |
| Hong Kong Open (Note: The event also ran as the Australian Masters (1983/1984–1987/1988 & 1995/1996)) | Non-Ranking Event | | | | | NH | 2R | Not Held | | | | NR | | Tournament Not Held | | | | | | | | | | | | | |
| Classic | SF | LQ | 1R | QF | F | QF | 3R | 2R | QF | Tournament Not Held | | | | | | | | | | | | | | | | | |
| Strachan Open | Tournament Not Held | | | | | | | | F | Tournament Not Held | | | | | | | | | | | | | | | | | |
| Dubai Classic (Note: The event ran under different names such as Thailand Classic (1995/1996) and Asian Classic (1996/1997)) | Tournament Not Held | | | | | NR | SF | 2R | W | W | 2R | 1R | W | 1R | Tournament Not Held | | | | | | | | | | | | |
| German Masters (Note: The event ran under different name as German Open (1995/1996–1997/1998)) | Tournament Not Held | | | | | | | | | | | | 2R | 1R | F | NR | Tournament Not Held | | | | | | | | | | |
| Malta Grand Prix | Tournament Not Held | | | | | | | | | | | Non-Ranking Event | | | | | QF | NR | Tournament Not Held | | | | | | | | |
| Thailand Masters (Note: The event ran under different names such as Asian Open (1989/1990 to 1992/1993) and Thailand Open (1993/1994 to 1996/1997).) | Non-Ranking Event | | | | Not Held | | WD | QF | 3R | QF | 2R | 2R | QF | QF | F | SF | 1R | SF | 1R | NR | Not Held | | | NR | Not Held | | |
| Scottish Open (Note: The event ran under different names such as International Open (1983/1984 to 1984/1985, 1986/1987 to 1996/1997), Goya Matchroom Trophy (1985/1986) and Players Championship (2003/2004).) | A | LQ | QF | 1R | 3R | 1R | QF | Not Held | | 2R | W | SF | 1R | QF | 2R | 3R | 1R | 3R | 2R | 1R | 3R | Tournament Not Held | | | | | |
| British Open (Note: The event was also known as the International Masters (1983/1984).) | NR | 2R | 3R | 1R | SF | SF | 1R | 1R | 1R | 3R | 3R | SF | QF | 1R | QF | QF | 2R | 2R | 2R | 3R | 1R | 2R | Tournament Not Held | | | | |
| Irish Masters | Non-Ranking Event | | | | | | | | | | | | | | | | | | | LQ | LQ | LQ | NH | NR | Not Held | | |
| European Open (Note: The event ran under different names such as the Irish Open (1998/1999) and Malta Cup (2004/2005–2007/2008)) | Tournament Not Held | | | | | W | W | 1R | SF | 2R | SF | F | W | F | NR | SF | Not Held | | LQ | LQ | LQ | LQ | 1R | LQ | NR | Not Held | |
| Northern Ireland Trophy | Tournament Not Held | | | | | | | | | | | | | | | | | | | | | | NR | LQ | 1R | LQ | NH |
| Bahrain Championship | Tournament Not Held | | | | | | | | | | | | | | | | | | | | | | | | | LQ | NH |
Former non-ranking tournaments
| UK Championship | 1R | Tournament Not Held | | | | | | | | | | | | | | | | | | | | | | | | | |
| Canadian Masters | Not Held | | QF | A | A | R | Tournament Not Held | | | | | | | | | | | | | | | | | | | | |
| Hong Kong Open | A | A | SF | A | QF | NH | R | Not Held | | | | A | A | Tournament Not Held | | | | | | | | | | | | | |
| Fosters Professional (Note: The event also ran as the Carlsberg Challenge (1984/1985–1986/1987) and the Carling Challenge (1987/1988)) | NH | A | SF | A | A | SF | Tournament Not Held | | | | | | | | | | | | | | | | | | | | |
| Pontins Professional | A | QF | QF | SF | W | QF | A | A | A | A | A | A | A | A | A | A | A | Tournament Not Held | | | | | | | | | |
| English Professional Championship | NH | 2R | 2R | QF | 2R | F | Tournament Not Held | | | | | | | | | | | | | | | | | | | | |
| New Zealand Masters | NH | A | Not Held | | | A | QF | Tournament Not Held | | | | | | | | | | | | | | | | | | | |
| Norwich Union Grand Prix | Tournament Not Held | | | | | A | SF | W | Tournament Not Held | | | | | | | | | | | | | | | | | | |
| World Masters | Tournament Not Held | | | | | | | 2R | Tournament Not Held | | | | | | | | | | | | | | | | | | |
| London Masters | Tournament Not Held | | | | | F | F | SF | Tournament Not Held | | | | | | | | | | | | | | | | | | |
| Thailand Masters | A | RR | A | A | Not Held | | | | SF | Ranking Event | | | | | | | | | | A | Not Held | | | A | Not Held | | |
| European Challenge | Tournament Not Held | | | | | | | | QF | A | Tournament Not Held | | | | | | | | | | | | | | | | |
| Hong Kong Challenge (Note: The event was also called the Hong Kong Masters (1983/1984–1988/1989)) | A | QF | A | A | A | QF | NH | A | QF | Tournament Not Held | | | | | | | | | | | | | | | | | |
| Indian Challenge | Tournament Not Held | | | | | | | | F | Tournament Not Held | | | | | | | | | | | | | | | | | |
| Belgian Challenge | Tournament Not Held | | | | | | | | QF | Tournament Not Held | | | | | | | | | | | | | | | | | |
| Kent Classic (Note: The event was also called the Kent Cup (1986/1987–1987/1988 & 1989/1990–1990/1991)) | Not Held | | | A | W | A | A | A | NH | W | Tournament Not Held | | | | | | | | | | | | | | | | |
| Belgian Masters | Tournament Not Held | | | | | | | W | SF | F | Not Held | | A | Tournament Not Held | | | | | | | | | | | | | |
| World Matchplay | Tournament Not Held | | | | | F | F | QF | QF | QF | Tournament Not Held | | | | | | | | | | | | | | | | |
| Nescafe Extra Challenge | Tournament Not Held | | | | | | | A | NH | RR | Tournament Not Held | | | | | | | | | | | | | | | | |
| Pot Black | A | 1R | 1R | Tournament Not Held | | | | | QF | SF | 1R | Tournament Not Held | | | | | | | | | | | A | A | A | Not Held | |
| Malta Grand Prix | Tournament Not Held | | | | | | | | | | | W | A | A | A | A | R | A | Tournament Not Held | | | | | | | | |
| Red & White Challenge | Tournament Not Held | | | | | | | | | | | | F | Tournament Not Held | | | | | | | | | | | | | |
| German Masters | Tournament Not Held | | | | | | | | | | | | Ranking Event | | | W | Tournament Not Held | | | | | | | | | | |
| Champions Cup (Note: The event ran under a different name as the Charity Challenge (1994/1995–1998/1999)) | Tournament Not Held | | | | | | | | | | | QF | QF | QF | QF | 1R | RR | A | A | Tournament Not Held | | | | | | | |
| Scottish Masters | A | A | A | QF | A | NH | SF | QF | QF | QF | QF | 1R | 1R | SF | SF | QF | QF | A | A | A | Tournament Not Held | | | | | | |
| Irish Masters | A | A | A | A | A | SF | QF | F | SF | SF | QF | SF | 1R | QF | SF | 1R | SF | A | A | Ranking Event | | | A | Tournament Not Held | | | |

Performance Table Legend
| LQ | lost in the qualifying draw | #R | lost in the early rounds of the tournament (WR = Wildcard round, RR = Round robin) | QF | lost in the quarter-finals |
| SF | lost in the semi-finals | F | lost in the final | W | won the tournament |
| DNQ | did not qualify for the tournament | A | did not participate in the tournament | WD | withdrew from the tournament |

| NH / Not Held | means an event was not held. |
| NR / Non-Ranking Event | means an event is/was no longer a ranking event. |
| R / Ranking Event | means an event is/was a ranking event. |
| MR / Minor-Ranking Event | means an event is/was a minor-ranking event. |
| PA / Pro-am Event | means an event is/was a pro-am event. |

== Career finals ==
=== Ranking finals: 18 (9 titles) ===
Legend
World Championship (1–1)
UK Championship (1–1)
Other (7–7)

Ranking event finals contested by John Parrott
| Outcome | No. | Year | Championship | Opponent in the final | Score | Ref. |
|---|---|---|---|---|---|---|
| Runner-up | 1. | 1988 | The Classic | (England) Steve Davis | 11–13 | |
| Winner | 1. | 1989 | European Open | (Wales) Terry Griffiths | 9–8 | |
| Runner-up | 2. | 1989 | World Snooker Championship | (England) Steve Davis | 3–18 | |
| Winner | 2. | 1990 | European Open (2) | (Scotland) Stephen Hendry | 10–6 | |
| Winner | 3. | 1991 | World Snooker Championship | (England) Jimmy White | 18–11 | |
| Winner | 4. | 1991 | Dubai Classic | (England) Tony Knowles | 9–3 | |
| Winner | 5. | 1991 | UK Championship | (England) Jimmy White | 16–13 | |
| Runner-up | 3. | 1992 | Strachan Open | (Thailand) James Wattana | 5–9 | |
| Winner | 6. | 1992 | Dubai Classic (2) | (Scotland) Stephen Hendry | 9–8 | |
| Runner-up | 4. | 1992 | UK Championship | (England) Jimmy White | 9–16 | |
| Winner | 7. | 1994 | International Open | (Thailand) James Wattana | 9–5 | |
| Runner-up | 5. | 1994 | European Open | (Scotland) Stephen Hendry | 3–9 | |
| Winner | 8. | 1995 | Thailand Classic (3) | (England) Nigel Bond | 9–6 | |
| Runner-up | 6. | 1996 | Welsh Open | (Wales) Mark Williams | 3–9 | |
| Winner | 9. | 1996 | European Open (3) | (England) Peter Ebdon | 9–7 | |
| Runner-up | 7. | 1997 | European Open (2) | (Scotland) John Higgins | 5–9 | |
| Runner-up | 8. | 1997 | German Open | (Scotland) John Higgins | 4–9 | |
| Runner-up | 9. | 1998 | Thailand Masters | (Scotland) Stephen Hendry | 6–9 | |

=== Non-ranking finals: 23 (9 titles) ===
Legend
Legend
The Masters (0–3)
Premier League (0–2)
Other (9–9)

Non-ranking finals contested by John Parrott
| Outcome | No. | Year | Championship | Opponent in the final | Score | Ref. |
|---|---|---|---|---|---|---|
| Winner | 1. | 1982 | Zimbabwe Open | Neal Foulds (ENG) | 6–5 | |
| Winner | 2. | 1983 | Zimbabwe Open | Joe Johnson (ENG) | 7–1 | |
| Winner | 3. | 1988 | Kent Cup | Martin Clark (ENG) | 5–1 | |
| Winner | 4. | 1988 | Pontins Professional | Mike Hallett (ENG) | 9–1 | |
| Runner-up | 1. | 1988 | World Matchplay | Steve Davis (ENG) | 5–9 | |
| Runner-up | 2. | 1989 | The Masters | Stephen Hendry (SCO) | 6–9 | |
| Runner-up | 3. | 1989 | English Professional Championship | Mike Hallett (ENG) | 7–9 | |
| Runner-up | 4. | 1989 | Matchroom League | Steve Davis (ENG) | RR | |
| Runner-up | 5. | 1989 | London Masters | Stephen Hendry (SCO) | 2–4 | |
| Runner-up | 6. | 1989 | World Matchplay (2) | Jimmy White (ENG) | 9–18 | |
| Runner-up | 7. | 1990 | The Masters (2) | Stephen Hendry (SCO) | 4–9 | |
| Runner-up | 8. | 1990 | London Masters (2) | Stephen Hendry (SCO) | 2–4 | |
| Winner | 5. | 1990 | Belgian Masters | Jimmy White (ENG) | 9–6 | |
| Winner | 6. | 1990 | Norwich Union Grand Prix | Steve Davis (ENG) | 4–2 | |
| Runner-up | 9. | 1991 | Irish Masters | Steve Davis (ENG) | 5–9 | |
| Runner-up | 10. | 1991 | Indian Challenge | Stephen Hendry (SCO) | 5–9 | |
| Runner-up | 11. | 1992 | The Masters (3) | Stephen Hendry (SCO) | 4–9 | |
| Winner | 7. | 1992 | Kent Classic | Stephen Hendry (SCO) | 6–5 | |
| Runner-up | 12. | 1992 | Belgian Masters | James Wattana (THA) | 5–10 | |
| Runner-up | 13. | 1994 | European League (2) | Stephen Hendry (SCO) | 7–10 | |
| Winner | 8. | 1994 | Malta Grand Prix | Tony Drago (MLT) | 7–6 | |
| Runner-up | 14. | 1995 | Red & White Challenge | Nigel Bond (ENG) | 6–8 | |
| Winner | 9. | 1998 | German Masters | Mark Williams (WAL) | 6–4 | |

=== Team finals: 1 (1 title) ===
Team event finals contested by Parrott
| Outcome | No. | Year | Championship | Team | Opponent in the final | Score | Ref |
|---|---|---|---|---|---|---|---|
| Winner | 1. | 2000 | Nations Cup | England | Wales | 6–4 | |

=== Pro-am finals: 3 (2 titles) ===
Pro-am finals contested by John Parrott
| Outcome | No. | Year | Championship | Opponent in the final | Score | Ref. |
|---|---|---|---|---|---|---|
| Winner | 1. | 1982 | Pontins Spring Open | Ray Reardon (WAL) | 7–4 | |
| Runner-up | 1. | 1985 | Pontins Spring Open | Jim Chambers (ENG) | 6–7 | |
| Winner | 2. | 1986 | Pontins Spring Open (2) | Tony Putnam (ENG) | 7–6 | |

=== Amateur finals: 8 (3 titles) ===
Amateur snooker finals contested by John Parrott
| Outcome | No. | Year | Championship | Opponent in the final | Score | Ref. |
|---|---|---|---|---|---|---|
| Runner-up | 1. | 1979 | British Under-16 Championship | Tony Pyle (ENG) | 2–3 | |
| Runner-up | 2. | 1979 | Pontins Junior Championship | Dave Gilbert (ENG) | 1–3 | |
| Runner-up | 3. | 1980 | British Under-16 Championship (2) | Terry Whitthread (ENG) | 1–3 | |
| Winner | 1. | 1981 | Pontins Junior Championship | Don Tate (ENG) | 3–1 | |
| Runner-up | 4. | 1982 | British Under-19 Championship | Neal Foulds (ENG) | 2–3 | |
| Winner | 2. | 1982 | Junior Pot Black | John Keers (ENG) | 156–70 (Note: Final decided on aggregate score over two frames) | |
| Runner-up | 5. | 1983 | English Amateur Championship | Tony Jones (ENG) | 9–13 | |
| Winner | 3. | 1983 | Junior Pot Black (2) | Steve Ventham (ENG) | | |

=== Seniors finals: 1 ===
Seniors finals contested by John Parrott
| Outcome | No. | Year | Championship | Opponent in the final | Score | Ref. |
|---|---|---|---|---|---|---|
| Runner-up | 1. | 2017 | World Seniors Championship | Peter Lines (ENG) | 0–4 | |
