= Norwich Union Grand Prix =

Tournament information
- Venue: Various
- Location: Monte Carlo
- Country: Monaco
- Established: 1988
- Organisation(s): WPBSA
- Format: Non-ranking event
- Final year: 1990
- Final champion: (England) John Parrott

The Norwich Union Grand Prix was a non-ranking snooker tournament staged between 1988 and 1990. Matches were held at various venues across Europe with the final stage being played in Monte Carlo, Monaco. The tournaments were sponsored by Norwich Union, who had last sponsored a snooker tournament, the Norwich Union Open, fourteen years previously.

== Winners ==
Year	Winner	Runner-up	Final score	Season
1988	(England) Steve Davis	(England) Jimmy White	5–4	1988/89
1989	(England) Joe Johnson	(Scotland) Stephen Hendry	5–3	1989/90
1990	(England) John Parrott	(England) Steve Davis	4–2	1990/91
