= 1992 British Open =

1992 Pearl Assurance British Open
Tournament information
- Dates: 17–29 February 1992
- Venue: Assembly Rooms
- City: Derby
- Country: England
- Organisation: WPBSA
- Format: Ranking event
- Total prize fund: £425,000
- Winner's share: £75,000
- Highest break: James Wattana (THA) (147)

Final
- Champion: Jimmy White (ENG)
- Runner-up: James Wattana (THA)
- Score: 10–7

The 1992 British Open (officially the 1992 Pearl Assurance British Open) was a professional ranking snooker tournament, that was held from 17 to 29 February 1992 at the Assembly Rooms in Derby, England.

Jimmy White won the tournament by defeating James Wattana 10–7 in the final. The defending champion Stephen Hendry was defeated in the quarter-final by Ken Doherty.

== Main draw ==
Last 64; Best of 9 frames
(England) Jimmy White	5
(Canada) Cliff Thorburn	3
(England) Mike Hallett	5
(Australia) Robby Foldvari	0
(Wales) Darren Morgan	5
(New Zealand) Dene O'Kane	0
(South Africa) Peter Francisco	5
(England) David Taylor	3
(Wales) Terry Griffiths	5
(England) Ken Owers	1
(England) Tony Jones	5
(Wales) Tony Chappel	3
(England) Mark Johnston-Allen	5
(England) John Virgo	4
(England) Andrew Cairns	5
(Wales) Steve Newbury	1
(England) Steve Davis	5
(England) David Roe	4
(Wales) Mark Bennett	5
(Scotland) Alan McManus	4
(England) Martin Clark	5
(Australia) John Campbell	3
(England) Steve James	5
(Scotland) Drew Henry	3
(Canada) Alain Robidoux	5
(England) Mark Rowing	3
(England) Tony Knowles	5
(Northern Ireland) Jason Prince	2
(England) Joe Johnson	5
(Malta) Joe Grech	3
(England) Nigel Bond	5
(England) Stuart Reardon	1
(Thailand) James Wattana	5
(Republic of Ireland) Stephen Murphy	1
(Northern Ireland) Dennis Taylor	5
(England) Brian Morgan	3
(Malta) Tony Drago	5
(England) Robert Marshall	3
(Wales) Paul Davies	5
(Wales) Cliff Wilson	4
(Wales) Doug Mountjoy	5
(England) Paul Medati	0
(England) Willie Thorne	5
(England) Les Dodd	2
(England) Neal Foulds	w/o
(England) Terry Whitthread	w/d
(Canada) Marcel Gauvreau	5
(Canada) Bob Chaperon	3
(Republic of Ireland) Ken Doherty	5
(England) John Parrott	4
(Wales) Wayne Jones	5
(England) Rex Williams	0
(Australia) Eddie Charlton	5
(Northern Ireland) Terry Murphy	3
(England) Jason Weston	5
(England) Dean Reynolds	0
(Scotland) Stephen Hendry	5
(England) Jason Ferguson	0
(England) Danny Fowler	5
(England) Troy Shaw	4
(England) Gary Wilkinson	5
(England) Jim Chambers	4
(South Africa) Silvino Francisco	5
(England) Jason Smith	1

Last 32; Best of 9 frames
(England) Jimmy White	5
(England) Mike Hallett	3
(Wales) Darren Morgan	5
(South Africa) Peter Francisco	2
(Wales) Terry Griffiths	5
(England) Tony Jones	4
(England) Mark Johnston-Allen	5
(England) Andrew Cairns	1
(England) Steve Davis	5
(Wales) Mark Bennett	2
(England) Martin Clark	5
(England) Steve James	4
(Canada) Alain Robidoux	5
(England) Tony Knowles	3
(England) Joe Johnson	5
(England) Nigel Bond	4
(Thailand) James Wattana	5
(Northern Ireland) Dennis Taylor	1
(Malta) Tony Drago	5
(Wales) Paul Davies	1
(Wales) Doug Mountjoy	5
(England) Willie Thorne	3
(England) Neal Foulds	5
(Canada) Marcel Gauvreau	2
(Republic of Ireland) Ken Doherty	5
(Wales) Wayne Jones	4
(Australia) Eddie Charlton	5
(England) Jason Weston	1
(Scotland) Stephen Hendry	5
(England) Danny Fowler	1
(England) Gary Wilkinson	5
(South Africa) Silvino Francisco	2

Last 16; Best of 9 frames
(England) Jimmy White	5
(Wales) Darren Morgan	1
(Wales) Terry Griffiths	5
(England) Mark Johnston-Allen	4
(England) Steve Davis	5
(England) Martin Clark	0
(Canada) Alain Robidoux	5
(England) Joe Johnson	4
(Thailand) James Wattana	5
(Malta) Tony Drago	1
(Wales) Doug Mountjoy	5
(England) Neal Foulds	3
(Republic of Ireland) Ken Doherty	5
(Australia) Eddie Charlton	2
(Scotland) Stephen Hendry	5
(England) Gary Wilkinson	1

Quarter-finals; Best of 9 frames
(England) Jimmy White	5
(Wales) Terry Griffiths	3
(England) Steve Davis	5
(Canada) Alain Robidoux	3
(Thailand) James Wattana	5
(Wales) Doug Mountjoy	3
(Republic of Ireland) Ken Doherty	5
(Scotland) Stephen Hendry	2

Semi-finals; Best of 17 frames
(England) Jimmy White	9
(England) Steve Davis	8
(Thailand) James Wattana	9
(Republic of Ireland) Ken Doherty	6

Final; Best of 19 frames
(England) Jimmy White	10
(Thailand) James Wattana	7

== Final ==
Final: Best of 19 frames. Referee: Len Ganley; Assembly Rooms, Derby, England. 29 February 1992.
Jimmy White; England	10–7	James Wattana; Thailand
Afternoon: 81–38, 66–46, 87–28 (87), 71–4, 78–48, 69–55, 66–15, 3–72 (63); Evening: 6–77, 25–84 (50), 34–78 (77), 0–69, 74–41, 26–78, 29–78 (78), 113–0 (113), 67–49
113	Highest break	78
1	Century breaks	0
2	50+ breaks	4
