= 1985 Classic (snooker) =

Tournament information
- Dates: 4–13 January 1985
- Venue: Spectrum Arena
- City: Warrington
- Country: England
- Organisation: WPBSA
- Format: Ranking event
- Total prize fund: £200,000
- Winner's share: £40,000
- Highest break: Willie Thorne (ENG) (120)

Final
- Champion: Willie Thorne (ENG)
- Runner-up: Cliff Thorburn (CAN)
- Score: 13–8

The 1985 Mercantile Credit Classic was the sixth edition of the professional snooker tournament with qualifiers taking place in late 1984 and the main stages taking place from 4–13 January 1985. The tournament was played at the Spectrum Arena, Warrington, Cheshire. The event was extended from 8 days to 10, with the semi-final stage and the final both being extended to two days. Television coverage was shared by ITV and Channel 4.

Willie Thorne beat Steve Davis 9–8 in the first semi-final on the Thursday. Davis led 7–5 before Thorne won the next three frames to lead 8–7. Davis won the 16th frame to level the match but Thorne won the deciding frame after taking an early 62–0 lead. It was Thorne's first win over Davis. Thorne made a break of 120 in the fourth frame of the afternoon session, which eventually won him £4,000 for the highest break in the televised stage of the event.

In the second semi-final on the Friday, Cliff Thorburn beat Joe Johnson. Johnson won the second frame to level the match but Thornburn then ran away with the match winning 9–2.

Willie Thorne won his only ranking title beating Cliff Thorburn 13–8. The final was played in three sessions finishing on Sunday afternoon. Thorburn led 4–3 after the first session. Thorne won the first three frames in the evening session to lead 6–4 and finished the day with an 8–7 lead. There were three centuries in the session, 105 and 118 by Thorne and 100 by Thorburn. Thorburn levelled the match at 8–8 by winning the first frame on the Sunday but Thorne then won five frame in a row to win the match and the first prize of £40,000.

The final attracted an average of 12.6 million viewers on ITV, peaking at 16.2. million.

== Main draw ==
Last 16; Best of 9 frames
1	Steve Davis (ENG)	5
9	Alex Higgins (NIR)	2
5	Ray Reardon (WAL)	5
Eugene Hughes (IRL)	1
4	Kirk Stevens (CAN)	1
12	Willie Thorne (ENG)	5
Murdo MacLeod (SCO)	0
John Virgo (ENG)	5
3	Cliff Thorburn (CAN)	5
Steve Longworth (ENG)	3
8	Terry Griffiths (WAL)	5
Rex Williams (ENG)	3
7	Jimmy White (ENG)	2
Warren King (AUS)	5
Joe Johnson (ENG)	5
Cliff Wilson (WAL)	0

Quarter-finals; Best of 9 frames
1	(England) Steve Davis	5
5	(Wales) Ray Reardon	1
12	(England) Willie Thorne	5
(England) John Virgo	3
3	(Canada) Cliff Thorburn	5
8	(Wales) Terry Griffiths	4
(Australia) Warren King	1
(England) Joe Johnson	5

Semi-finals; Best of 17 frames
1	(England) Steve Davis	8
12	(England) Willie Thorne	9
3	(Canada) Cliff Thorburn	9
(England) Joe Johnson	2

Final; Best of 25 frames
12	(England) Willie Thorne	13
3	(Canada) Cliff Thorburn	8

== Final ==
Final: Best of 25 frames. Referee: John Williams. Spectrum Arena, Warrington, England, 12 & 13 January 1985.
Willie Thorne; England	13–8	Cliff Thorburn; Canada
First session: 82–0 (72), 57–81 (Thorne 52, Thorburn 77), 50–66, 92–14 (88), 29–64, 70–9, 53–66; Second session: 105–22 (105), 49–44, 62–40, 4–123 (75), 118–10 (118), 58–112 (72), 69–67 (Thorburn 66), 7–113 (100); Third session: 29–73, 75–5, 63–33, 96–24, 69–32, 66–18 (54)
118	Highest break	100
2	Century breaks	1
6	50+ breaks	5

== Qualifying ==
The last-32 round was played in Warrington in December 1984.

=== Last-32 round ===
Steve Davis (ENG)	5–0	Silvino Francisco (RSA)
Alex Higgins (NIR)	5–3	Marcel Gauvreau (CAN)
Ray Reardon (WAL)	5–3	Mike Hallett (ENG)
Tony Meo (ENG)	4–5	Eugene Hughes (IRL)
Kirk Stevens (CAN)	5–4	Paul Medati (ENG)
Willie Thorne (ENG)	5–2	Robby Foldvari (AUS)
Eddie Charlton (AUS)	1–5	Murdo MacLeod (SCO)
Bill Werbeniuk (CAN)	2–5	John Virgo (ENG)

Cliff Thorburn (CAN)	5–1	George Scott (ENG)
David Taylor (ENG)	4–5	Steve Longworth (ENG)
Terry Griffiths (WAL)	5–0	Patsy Fagan (IRL)
Dennis Taylor (NIR)	3–5	Rex Williams (ENG)
Jimmy White (ENG)	5–2	Paddy Browne (IRL)
John Spencer (ENG)	2–5	Warren King (AUS)
Tony Knowles (ENG)	1–5	Joe Johnson (ENG)
Doug Mountjoy (WAL)	4–5	Cliff Wilson (WAL)

== Century breaks ==
(Including qualifying rounds)

- 137 – Terry Griffiths
- 129 – Marcel Gauvreau
- 120, 118, 105, 100 – Willie Thorne
- 118 – Bill Werbeniuk
- 105, 100 – Cliff Thorburn
- 104, 102 – Steve Davis
- 104 – Joe Johnson
- 103 – Roger Bales
