= 2019 Seniors Masters =

The Seniors Masters
Tournament information
- Dates: 11 April 2019
- Venue: Crucible Theatre
- City: Sheffield
- Country: England
- Organisation: World Seniors Snooker
- Format: Seniors event
- Total prize fund: £12,500
- Winner's share: £7,500
- Highest break: (England) Barry Pinches (75)

Final
- Champion: (England) Joe Johnson
- Runner-up: (England) Barry Pinches
- Score: 2–1

The 2019 Seniors Masters was a senior snooker tournament, that took place on 11 April 2019 at the Crucible Theatre in Sheffield, England. It was the fourth event on the 2018/2019 World Seniors Tour.

A qualifying tournament took place from 8 to 10 March at the Northern Snooker Center in Leeds. Barry Pinches won 3–1 in the final against Aaron Canavan.

Despite losing in the final of the qualifying tournament, the reigning World Seniors Champion Aaron Canavan was assigned a place in the tournament following a withdrawal.

Cliff Thorburn won the 2018 edition, beating Johnathan Bagley 2–1 in the final. However, he lost 0–2 to Stephen Hendry in the first round of this year's edition.

1986 world champion Joe Johnson won the event, beating Barry Pinches 2–1 in the final.

== Prize fund ==
The breakdown of prize money is shown below:

- Winner: £7,500
- Runner-up: £2,500
- Semi-finals: £1,000
- Highest break: £500
- Total: £12,500

== Main draw ==
Quarter-finals; Best of 3 frames
(Canada) Cliff Thorburn (1)	0
(Scotland) Stephen Hendry	2
(Republic of Ireland) Ken Doherty (4)	0
(England) Barry Pinches	2
(England) Jimmy White (3)	1
(England) Joe Johnson	2*
(Jersey) Aaron Canavan (2)	w/o
(England) John Parrott	w/d

Semi-finals; Best of 3 frames
(Scotland) Stephen Hendry	0
(England) Barry Pinches	2
(England) Joe Johnson	2*
(Jersey) Aaron Canavan	1

Final; Best of 3 frames
(England) Barry Pinches	1
(England) Joe Johnson	2*

- All matches played with a 30-second shot clock, with players having two time-outs per match
- *Re-spotted black replaced final frame deciders

== Final ==
Final: Best of 3 frames. Referee: Michaela Tabb. Crucible Theatre, Sheffield, England, 11 April 2019.
Barry Pinches; England	1–2	Joe Johnson; England
26–60, 88–7 (72), 0–7 (re-spotted black)
72	Highest break	29
0	Century breaks	0
1	50+ breaks	0
