= New Zealand Masters (snooker) =

Tournament information
- Venue: New Zealand Parliament
- Location: Wellington
- Country: New Zealand
- Established: 1983
- Organisation(s): WPBSA
- Format: Non-ranking event
- Final year: 1989
- Final champion: (England) Willie Thorne

The New Zealand Masters was a non-ranking snooker tournament staged on four occasions between 1983 and 1989 when the British circuit was in its close season. The first event was held in 1983. The 1984 event at the Kingsgate Convention Centre in Auckland, and saw Jimmy White defeat Kirk Stevens 5–3 in the final. There was a gap of four years before the final two events were held, both in the Legislative Chamber of the New Zealand Parliament. The final of the first event in 1988 was won by Stephen Hendry, defeating Mike Hallett 6–1, while the final tournament in 1989 saw Willie Thorne defeat Joe Johnson 7–4 in the final.

== Winners ==
Year	Winner	Runner-up	Final score	Season	Venue
1983	(Canada) Bill Werbeniuk	(Wales) Doug Mountjoy	1–0	1983/84	Auckland
1984	(England) Jimmy White	(Canada) Kirk Stevens	5–3	1984/85	Auckland
1988	(Scotland) Stephen Hendry	(England) Mike Hallett	6–1	1988/89	Wellington
1989	(England) Willie Thorne	(England) Joe Johnson	7–4	1989/90	Wellington
