= 1987 Scottish Masters =

Tournament information
- Dates: 17–20 September 1987
- Venue: Hospitality Inn
- City: Glasgow
- Country: Scotland
- Organisation: WPBSA
- Format: Non-ranking event
- Total prize fund: £50,000
- Winner's share: £16,000
- Highest break: Dennis Taylor (NIR) (125)

Final
- Champion: Joe Johnson (ENG)
- Runner-up: Terry Griffiths (WAL)
- Score: 9–7

The 1987 Langs Scottish Masters was a professional non-ranking snooker tournament that took place between 17 and 20 September 1987 at the Hospitality Inn in Glasgow, Scotland.

Joe Johnson won the tournament by defeating Terry Griffiths 9–7 in the final.

== Prize fund ==
The breakdown of prize money for this year is shown below:

- Winner: £16,000
- Runner-up: £10,000
- Semi-final: £5,000
- Quarter-final: £3,125
- Highest break: £1,500
- Total: £50,000

== Tournament draw ==
Quarter-finals; Best of 9 frames
Joe Johnson (ENG)	5
Stephen Hendry (SCO)	2
Cliff Thorburn (CAN)	5
Dennis Taylor (NIR)	2
Terry Griffiths (WAL)	5
Neal Foulds (ENG)	4
Jimmy White (ENG)	5
Alex Higgins (NIR)	3

Semi-finals; Best of 11 frames
(England) Joe Johnson	6
(Canada) Cliff Thorburn	3
(Wales) Terry Griffiths	6
(England) Jimmy White	3

Final; Best of 17 Frames
(England) Joe Johnson	9
(Wales) Terry Griffiths	7
