= 1979 Canadian Open =

Canadian Open
Tournament information
- Dates: September 1979
- Venue: Canadian National Exhibition Stadium
- City: Toronto
- Country: Canada
- Organisation: WPBSA
- Format: Non-ranking event
- Winner's share: $6,000 (£2,222)

Final
- Champion: Cliff Thorburn (CAN)
- Runner-up: Terry Griffiths (WAL)
- Score: 17–16

The 1979 Canadian Open was the sixth edition of the snooker tournament the Canadian Open, which took place in September 1979.

Cliff Thorburn won the title for the fourth time, beating Terry Griffiths 17–16 in the final.

== Summary ==
The event was held at the Canadian National Exhibition Stadium and was open to any player who paid the $30 entry fee. The top eight seeds were placed into the seventh round.

Thorburn led Griffiths 10–3 in the final, before winning in the deciding frame, 17–16. Thorburn received $6,000 as winner, with Griffiths taking $2,000 as runner-up.

== Main draw ==
Results from the later rounds are shown below.

Round 6 Best of 17 frames
(Canada) Gordon Tekatch	9
(Canada) Ken Shea	5
(England) Jimmy White	9
(England) Tony Knowles	5
(Canada) Kevin Robitaille	9
(Canada) D Ireland	5
(Canada) Paul Thornley	9
(Canada) Jim Whittaker	2
(Canada) Derek Norris	9
(England) Bernard Bennett	7
(Canada) Jim Wych	9
(Canada) Mario Morra	7
(England) Joe Johnson	9
(Canada) John Bear	7
(Canada) Kari Elovaara	9
(Canada) Tom Regina	8

Round 7 Best of 17 frames
(Canada) Cliff Thorburn	9
(Canada) Gordon Tekatch	1
(England) Steve Davis	9
(England) Jimmy White	3
(Northern Ireland) Alex Higgins	9
(Canada) Kevin Robitaille	0
(Canada) Bill Werbeniuk	9
(Canada) Paul Thornley	8
(Wales) Terry Griffiths	9
(Canada) Derek Norris	6
(Canada) Jim Wych	9
(England) Tony Meo	8
(Canada) Kirk Stevens	9
(England) Joe Johnson	2
(Northern Ireland) Dennis Taylor	9
(Canada) Kari Elovaara	2

Quarter-finals; Best of 17 frames
(Canada) Cliff Thorburn	9
(England) Steve Davis	6
(Northern Ireland) Alex Higgins	9
(Canada) Bill Werbeniuk	5
(Wales) Terry Griffiths	9
(Canada) Jim Wych	2
(Canada) Kirk Stevens	9
(Northern Ireland) Dennis Taylor	3

Semi-finals; Best of 17 frames
(Canada) Cliff Thorburn	9
(Northern Ireland) Alex Higgins	6
(Wales) Terry Griffiths	9
(Canada) Kirk Stevens	8

Final; Best of 33 frames
(Canada) Cliff Thorburn	17
(Wales) Terry Griffiths	16

== Other events ==
There were two additional events run alongside the main snooker tournament.

- Women's snooker: Natalie Stelmach won the tournament by defeating Ann Johnson 4–3 in the final.
- English billiards: There were 16 entrants. Joe Johnson defeated Ian Williamson 500–284 in the final.
