= Barry Pinches =

English snooker player

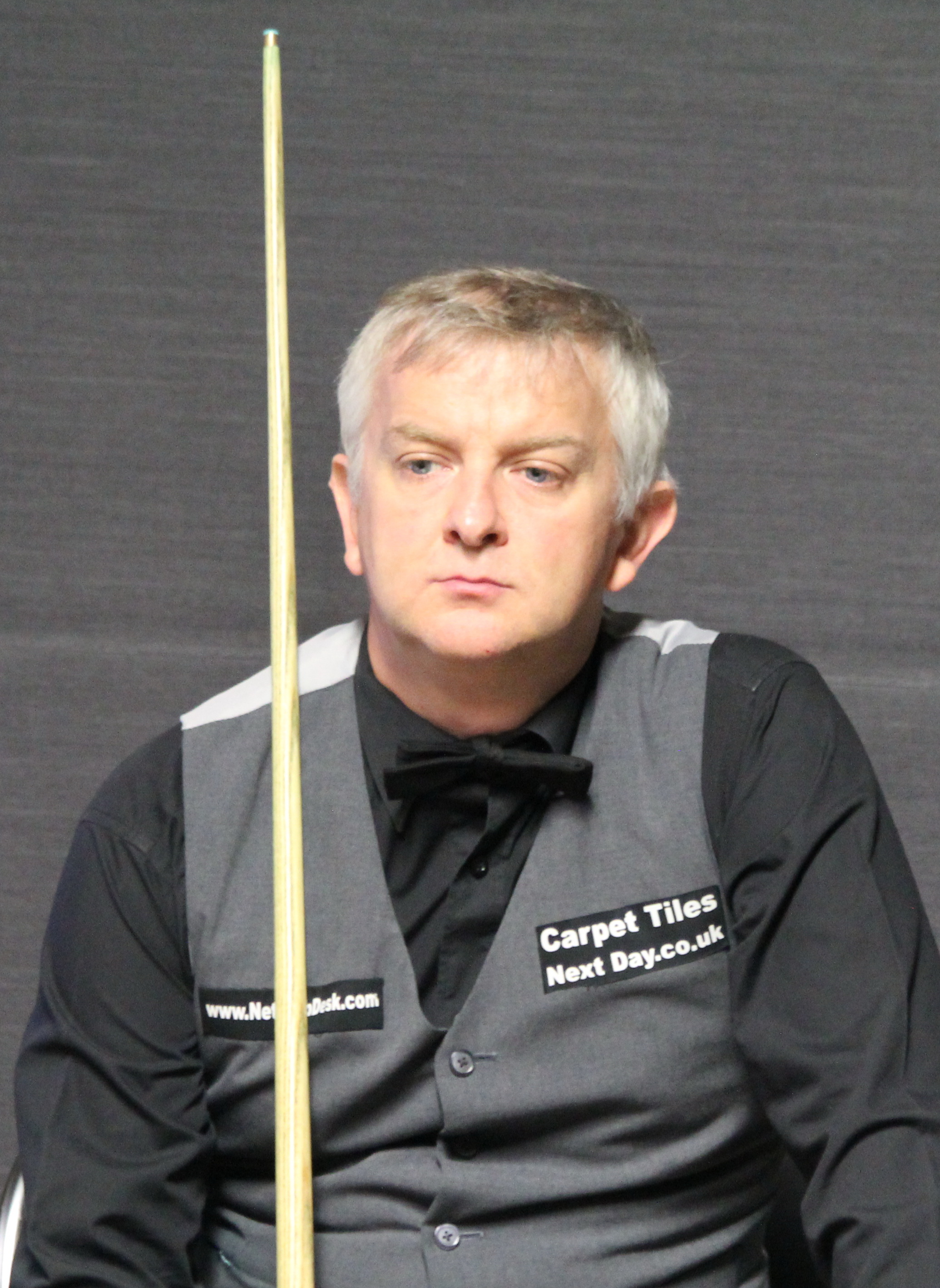
- Pinches at the 2016 Paul Hunter Classic

Personal information
- Nickname: The Canary
- Born: 13 July 1970 (age 56) Catton, Norwich, England

Sport
- Country: England
- Sport: Snooker
- Professional: 1989–1997, 1998–2016, 2019–2023
- Highest ranking: 18 (2005/2006)
- Maximum breaks: 1
- Century breaks: 161
- Best ranking finish: Quarter-final (x2)

Tournament wins
- Minor-ranking: 1

Barry Pinches (born 13 July 1970) is an English former professional snooker player, recognisable for his bright and flamboyant waistcoats, which usually feature the yellow and green colours of Norwich City F.C. He is a former top 32 player and ranking-event quarter-finalist. He has compiled over 100 century breaks in his career. He has also made one maximum break.

== Career ==
Pinches was born in Catton, Norwich on 13 July 1970. He won the English Amateur Championship in 1988, enabling him to turn professional in 1989. He was runner-up to James Wattana at the 1988 World Amateur Championship.

After a largely unsuccessful start to his career, he hit good form for a while in the 2000s. He defeated Jimmy White 10–8 in the 2004 World Championship, in a match which overran and had to be completed after other matches, then led Stephen Hendry 11–9 before losing 12–13 and has lost in the first round twice more – the 13-year gap between his first two Crucible appearances (1991–2004) is an all-time record. In his first appearance at the Crucible, in 1991 he lost 3–10 to Terry Griffiths. His best ranking tournament run to date, was in the 2003 UK Championship, where he reached the quarter-finals with victories over Marco Fu, Graeme Dott and Stephen Lee, before Stephen Hendry ended his run.

At one point he was established in the world's top 32, and provisionally 14 at one point – advancing 82–56–36–21 in the rankings over a strong sequence of seasons up to 2003–04. However, he dropped out of the top 32 two years later, and then won only one knock-out match in 2006–07, dropping to number #56. He attributed this loss of form to attempting to change his cue action. However, he won an invitational event that featured many top players, the 2007 Paul Hunter Classic that August, beating Neil Robertson and Ken Doherty en route. He also showed a return to form in the 2008 China Open by reaching the last 16, beating the defending champion, Graeme Dott 5–1 in the process, before going down by the same scoreline to Nigel Bond, who also beat him 7–10 in the final qualifying round of the 2008 World Championship. The 2008/2009 season was less successful for him however.

After reaching the final of Event 2 of the Players Tour Championship where he lost 3–4 to Mark Selby he went one better in Event 4 beating Mark Williams 4–1 and Ronnie O'Sullivan 4–3 in the semi-final and final respectively.

In the 2011–12 season Pinches narrowly missed out on a maximum 147 break at Event 2 of the Players Tour Championship in Gloucester, making it to the final black. He would later finish the season ranked world number 64, grabbing the final spot on offer through the world rankings to play in the 2012–13 season. He fell 23 places in the rankings during the season – the most of anyone on the snooker tour.

Pinches won two matches but then lost in the final round in qualifying for the first three ranking events of the season. He made it to the main draw at the next event, the 2012 International Championship, thanks to wins over Daniel Wells, Xiao Guodong and Joe Perry. He had to play in a wildcard round once at the venue in Chengdu, China, and lost 5–6 to Lu Ning. This was the furthest Pinches got in a ranking event this season, with it coming to an end when he was defeated 9–10 by Liam Highfield in the second round of World Championship Qualifying. He finished the year ranked world number 62.

Pinches qualified for the 2013 Indian Open, the fourth ranking event of the 2013–14 season with a 4–1 victory over Chris Wakelin. He almost pulled off a huge shock in the first round as he led Ding Junhui 3–2, but was beaten 4–3. Pinches also reached the main draw of the World Open and China Open but lost in the first round both times. Due to all 128 players on the tour earning a place in the first round of the Welsh Open, Pinches did not need to qualify and beat Nigel Bond 4–1, to set up a second round meeting with Ronnie O'Sullivan. Pinches stated before the match that he would stick to his percentage game with a defensive approach as he has always played the same no matter who the opponent is and he was defeated 4–1. Pinches had a consistent season in the European Tour events with his deepest runs being last 16 defeats at the Kay Suzanne Memorial Cup and Gdynia Open which saw him finish 49th on the Order of Merit. He dropped out of the top 64 in the rankings during the season as he ended it at number 76, but his European Tour results earned him a place on the tour for the 2014–15 and 2015–16 seasons as the sixth highest non-qualified player.

He edged out Peter Ebdon 5–4 to qualify for the 2014 Wuxi Classic, but lost 5–1 to Yan Bingtao in the first round. Pinches won three games to play in the final qualifying round for the Australian Goldfields Open where he lost 5–3 to Ebdon. He qualified for the International Championship and was beaten 6–2 by Robert Milkins in the opening round. Pinches' sole win in a ranking event this season came at the Welsh Open by defeating Jimmy White 4–3, but he was knocked out 4–2 by home favourite Mark Williams in the second round.-

Pinches had a very poor 2015–16 season as he only won two matches all year, both of these coming at the Haining Open. He was involved in two frames of note during the season. At the Ruhr Open, Pinches and Alan McManus set the record for the longest official snooker frame at 100 minutes and 24 seconds. The record stood until April 2017. In the final frame of his 4–1 defeat of Pinches in the first round of the Welsh Open, Ronnie O'Sullivan learned that the prize for making a 147 was £10,000 and decided after potting the 14th red to pot a pink and make a 146 instead as the prize money was not enough. Pinches dropped off the tour at the end of the season and he failed to regain his place on the main tour through the 2016 Q School. He qualified for the 2016 Paul Hunter Classic, but lost 4–3 to Cao Yupeng in the first round.

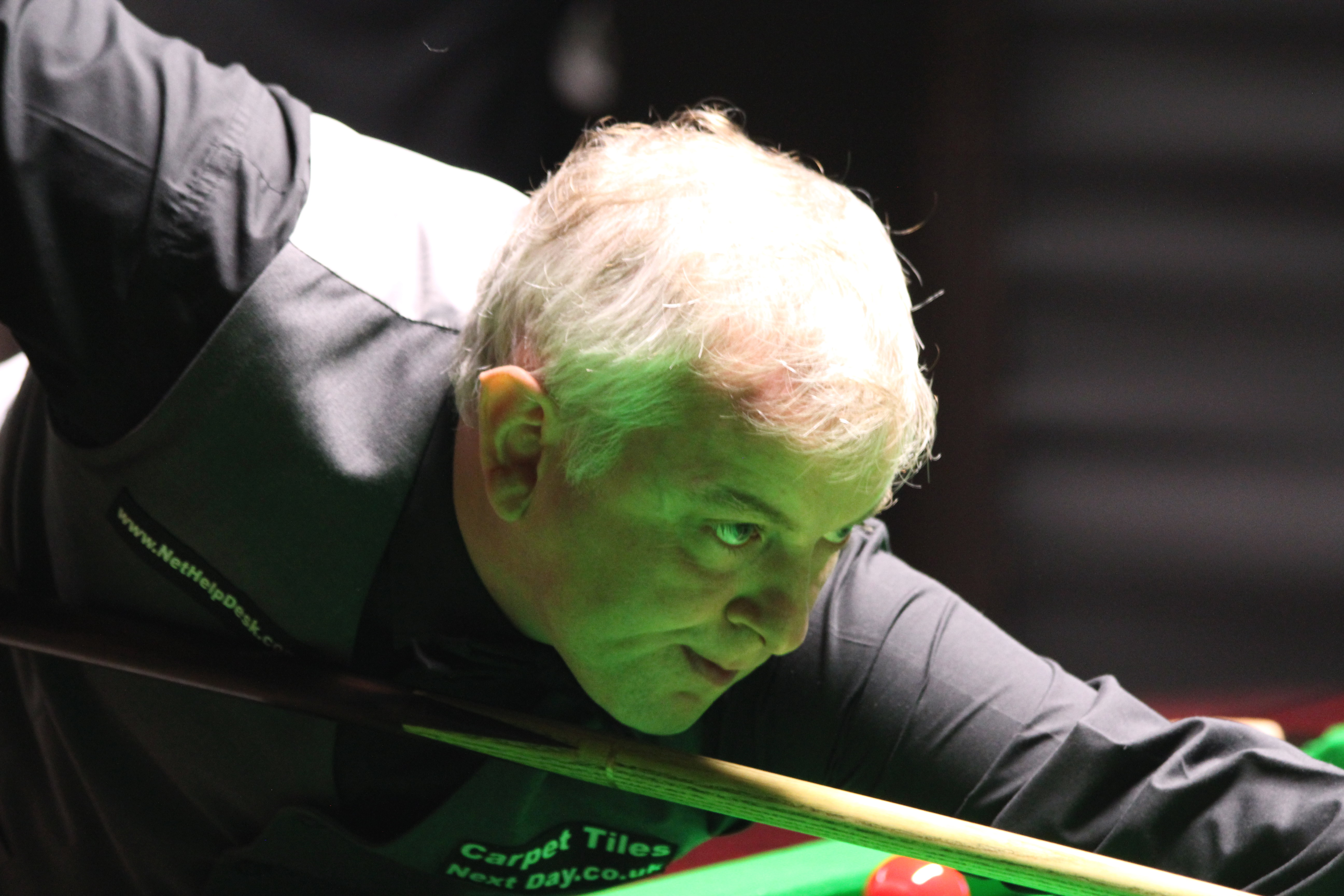
2016 Paul Hunter Classic

In the 2017 Gibraltar Open, Pinches lost in the second qualifying round; however, during the 2017–18 season, having again lost in Q-School in his attempt to re-qualify for the main tour, he qualified for that season's Paul Hunter Classic. He recovered from 1–3 behind in the first round to beat Matthew Bolton 4–3, but lost in the last 64 to fellow amateur George Pragnall by the same scoreline. On 14 October 2017 Barry entered the World Seniors Championship 1st Qualifying in Newbury for the Snooker Legends Tour. He lost 1–3 in the semi-finals to fellow amateur Matt Ford. In the frame that he won in the semi-finals he made a total clearance of 133 and won a pair of Oakley sunglasses for the highest break of the event. He entered the 2018 Q School in May in the hope of winning back his place on the main snooker tour. In the second round he was drawn against his son Luke. It was the first time a father played his son in a world snooker event since Neal Foulds played his father Geoff Foulds in 1986. Barry beat son Luke 4–1. In the following round he defeated fellow former pro Fang Xiongman.

In June 2019, Pinches came through the third event of the 2019 Q School by winning six matches to earn a two-year card on the World Snooker Tour for the 2019–2020 and 2020–21 seasons.

In June 2021, Pinches came through event 2 of the 2021 Q School by winning five matches to earn a two-year card on the World Snooker Tour for the 2021–2022 and 2022–2023 seasons.

== Performance and rankings timeline ==
Tournament	1989/ 90	1990/ 91	1991/ 92	1992/ 93	1993/ 94	1994/ 95	1995/ 96	1996/ 97	1997/ 98	1998/ 99	1999/ 00	2000/ 01	2001/ 02	2002/ 03	2003/ 04	2004/ 05	2005/ 06	2006/ 07	2007/ 08	2008/ 09	2009/ 10	2010/ 11	2011/ 12	2012/ 13	2013/ 14	2014/ 15	2015/ 16	2016/ 17	2017/ 18	2018/ 19	2019/ 20	2020/ 21	2021/ 22	2022/ 23	2023/ 24	2024/ 25
Ranking (Note: From the 2010/2011 season it shows the ranking at the beginning of the season)	(Note: New players on the Main Tour do not have a ranking)	82	73	103	109	141	132	79	(Note: He was an amateur)		113	97	82	56	36	21	18	33	56	50	52	57	41	64	62	(Note: Players qualified through European Tour Order of Merit started the season without prize money ranking points)	94				(Note: Players qualified through Q School started the season without ranking points)	75		83		
Ranking tournaments
Championship League	Tournament Not Held																		Non-Ranking Event													RR	RR	RR	2R	RR
English Open	Tournament Not Held																											A	A	A	1R	1R	LQ	LQ	A	
British Open	LQ	LQ	LQ	LQ	LQ	LQ	1R	LQ	A	LQ	LQ	LQ	LQ	1R	1R	3R	Tournament Not Held																2R	LQ	A	
Northern Ireland Open	Tournament Not Held																											A	A	A	1R	3R	LQ	LQ	1R	
International Championship	Tournament Not Held																							WR	LQ	1R	LQ	A	A	A	LQ	Not Held			A	
UK Championship	LQ	1R	LQ	LQ	LQ	LQ	1R	LQ	A	LQ	LQ	1R	LQ	1R	QF	3R	1R	1R	LQ	LQ	LQ	LQ	LQ	LQ	1R	1R	1R	A	A	A	1R	1R	1R	LQ	A	
Shoot Out	NH	NR	Tournament Not Held																			Non-Ranking Event						A	A	3R	1R	2R	2R	2R	2R	
Scottish Open (Note: The event was called the International Open (1989/1990, 1992/1993-1996/1997) and the Players Championship (2003/2004))	LQ	Not Held		LQ	LQ	LQ	1R	LQ	A	LQ	LQ	LQ	LQ	LQ	2R	Tournament Not Held								MR	Not Held			A	A	A	1R	1R	LQ	LQ	A	
German Masters (Note: The event was called the German Open (1995/1996–1997/1998))	Tournament Not Held						LQ	LQ	A	NR	Tournament Not Held											LQ	LQ	LQ	LQ	LQ	LQ	A	A	A	LQ	LQ	1R	LQ	LQ	
Welsh Open	Not Held		LQ	LQ	LQ	LQ	LQ	1R	A	LQ	LQ	LQ	1R	1R	2R	1R	1R	LQ	LQ	1R	LQ	LQ	LQ	LQ	2R	2R	1R	A	A	A	1R	1R	LQ	LQ	1R	
World Open (Note: The event was called the Grand Prix (1989/1990–2000/2001, 2004/2005–2009/2010) and the LG Cup (2001/2002–2003/2004))	LQ	LQ	LQ	LQ	1R	LQ	LQ	LQ	A	LQ	3R	LQ	LQ	LQ	1R	1R	QF	LQ	LQ	LQ	2R	LQ	LQ	LQ	1R	Not Held		A	A	A	1R	Not Held			LQ	
World Grand Prix	Tournament Not Held																									NR	DNQ	DNQ	DNQ	DNQ	DNQ	DNQ	DNQ	DNQ	DNQ	
Players Championship (Note: The event was called the Players Tour Championship Grand Final (2010/2011–2015/2016))	Tournament Not Held																					2R	DNQ	DNQ	DNQ	DNQ	DNQ	DNQ	DNQ	DNQ	DNQ	DNQ	DNQ	DNQ	DNQ	
Tour Championship	Tournament Not Held																													DNQ	DNQ	DNQ	DNQ	DNQ	DNQ	
World Championship	LQ	1R	LQ	LQ	LQ	LQ	LQ	LQ	LQ	LQ	LQ	LQ	LQ	LQ	2R	1R	LQ	LQ	LQ	LQ	LQ	LQ	LQ	LQ	LQ	LQ	LQ	A	A	A	LQ	LQ	LQ	LQ	A	
Non-ranking tournaments
The Masters	A	LQ	LQ	A	LQ	LQ	LQ	LQ	LQ	LQ	LQ	LQ	LQ	LQ	LQ	A	LQ	LQ	LQ	LQ	LQ	A	A	A	A	A	A	A	A	A	A	A	A	A	A	
World Seniors Championship	Not Held		A	Tournament Not Held																		A	A	A	A	LQ	LQ	A	1R	NH	A	QF	A	A	SF	
Former ranking tournaments
Classic	LQ	LQ	LQ	Tournament Not Held																																
Strachan Open	Not Held		LQ	MR	NR	Tournament Not Held																														
Dubai Classic (Note: The event was called the Dubai Masters (1988/1989), the Thailand Classic (1995/1996) and the Asian Classic (1996/1997))	LQ	LQ	LQ	LQ	LQ	LQ	LQ	LQ	Tournament Not Held																											
Malta Grand Prix	Tournament Not Held					Non-Ranking Event					LQ	NR	Tournament Not Held																							
Thailand Masters (Note: The event was called the Asian Open (1989/1990–1992/1993) and Thailand Open (1993/1994–1996/1997))	LQ	LQ	LQ	LQ	LQ	LQ	1R	LQ	A	LQ	LQ	LQ	1R	NR	Not Held			NR	Tournament Not Held																	
Irish Masters	Non-Ranking Event													LQ	LQ	1R	NH	NR	Tournament Not Held																	
Northern Ireland Trophy	Tournament Not Held																NR	LQ	LQ	LQ	Tournament Not Held															
Bahrain Championship	Tournament Not Held																			2R	Tournament Not Held															
Wuxi Classic (Note: The event was called the Jiangsu Classic (2008/2009–2009/2010))	Tournament Not Held																			Non-Ranking Event				LQ	LQ	1R	Tournament Not Held									
Australian Goldfields Open (Note: The event was called the Hong Kong Open (1989/1990), the Australian Open (1994/1995–1995/1996) and the Australian Masters (1995/1996))	2R	Tournament Not Held				Non-Ranking		Tournament Not Held															1R	LQ	LQ	LQ	LQ	Tournament Not Held								
Shanghai Masters	Tournament Not Held																		LQ	LQ	LQ	LQ	LQ	LQ	LQ	LQ	LQ	A	A	Non-Ranking		Not Held			Non-Ranking	
Paul Hunter Classic (Note: The event was called the Grand Prix Fürth (2004/2005) and the Fürth German Open (2005/2006–2006/2007))	Tournament Not Held															Pro-am Event						Minor-Ranking Event						1R	2R	1R	NR	Tournament Not Held				
Indian Open	Tournament Not Held																								1R	LQ	NH	A	A	A	Tournament Not Held					
China Open (Note: The event was called the China International (1997/1998–1998/1999))	Tournament Not Held								NR	LQ	LQ	LQ	LQ	Not Held		1R	LQ	LQ	LQ	LQ	LQ	LQ	LQ	LQ	1R	LQ	LQ	A	A	A	Tournament Not Held					
Riga Masters (Note: The event was called the Riga Open (2014/2015–2015/2016))	Tournament Not Held																									Minor-Rank		A	A	A	LQ	Tournament Not Held				
China Championship	Tournament Not Held																											NR	A	A	LQ	Tournament Not Held				
WST Pro Series	Tournament Not Held																															RR	Tournament Not Held			
Turkish Masters	Tournament Not Held																																LQ	Not Held		
Gibraltar Open	Tournament Not Held																										MR	LQ	1R	2R	2R	1R	1R	Not Held		
WST Classic	Tournament Not Held																																	1R	Not Held	
European Masters (Note: The event was called the European Open (1989/1990-1996/1997, 2001/2002-2003/2004), the Irish Open (1998/1999) and the Malta Cup (2004/2005–2007/2008))	1R	1R	LQ	LQ	LQ	LQ	LQ	LQ	NH	LQ	Not Held		LQ	1R	1R	1R	2R	LQ	NR	Tournament Not Held								A	A	A	LQ	1R	LQ	1R	LQ	NH
Former non-ranking tournaments
Malta Masters	Tournament Not Held						1R	Tournament Not Held																												
Shoot Out	NH	1R	Tournament Not Held																			1R	QF	1R	1R	A	A	Ranking Event								
Six-red World Championship (Note: The event was called the Six-red Snooker International (2008/2009) and the Six-red World Grand Prix (2009/2010))	Tournament Not Held																			A	A	A	NH	A	A	A	A	A	A	A	A	Not Held		LQ	Not Held	

Performance Table Legend
LQ	lost in the qualifying draw	#R	lost in the early rounds of the tournament (WR = Wildcard round, RR = Round robin)	QF	lost in the quarter-finals
SF	lost in the semi-finals	F	lost in the final	W	won the tournament
DNQ	did not qualify for the tournament	A	did not participate in the tournament	WD	withdrew from the tournament

NH / Not Held	means an event was not held.
NR / Non-Ranking Event	means an event is/was no longer a ranking event.
R / Ranking Event	means an event is/was a ranking event.
MR / Minor-Ranking Event	means an event is/was a minor-ranking event.
PA / Pro-am Event	means an event is/was a pro-am event.

== Career finals ==
=== Minor-ranking finals: 2 (1 title) ===
Outcome	No.	Year	Championship	Opponent in the final	Score
Runner-up	1.	2010	Players Tour Championship Event 2	(England) Mark Selby	3–4
Winner	1.	2010	Players Tour Championship Event 4	(England) Ronnie O'Sullivan	4–3

=== Pro-am finals: 4 (2 titles) ===
Outcome	No.	Year	Championship	Opponent in the final	Score
Runner-up	1.	1987	Pontins Spring Open	(England) Stefan Mazrocis	2–7
Winner	1.	2007	Paul Hunter Classic	(Republic of Ireland) Ken Doherty	4–0
Runner-up	2.	2007	Dutch Open	(England) Michael Holt	4–6
Winner	2.	2010	Dutch Open	(Belgium) Bjorn Haneveer	6–3

=== Amateur finals: 5 (3 titles) ===
Outcome	No.	Year	Championship	Opponent in the final	Score
Winner	1.	1986	British Under-19 Championship	(Thailand) James Wattana	3–0
Winner	2.	1988	English Amateur Championship	(England) Craig Edwards	13–6
Runner-up	1.	1988	World Amateur Championship	(Thailand) James Wattana	8–11
Runner-up	2.	1989	English Amateur Championship	(England) Nigel Bond	11–13
Winner	3.	2018	Challenge Tour – Event 3	(Wales) Jackson Page	3–2

=== Seniors finals: 1 ===
Outcome	No.	Year	Championship	Opponent in the final	Score
Runner-up	1.	2019	The Seniors Masters	(England) Joe Johnson	1–2
