= 1983 UK Championship =

1983 Coral UK Championship
Tournament information
- Dates: 18 November – 4 December 1983
- Venue: Preston Guild Hall
- City: Preston
- Country: England
- Organisation: WPBSA
- Format: Non-ranking event
- Total prize fund: £60,000
- Winner's share: £12,000
- Highest break: (England) Tony Meo (139)

Final
- Champion: (Northern Ireland) Alex Higgins
- Runner-up: (England) Steve Davis
- Score: 16–15

The 1983 UK Championship (officially the 1983 Coral UK Championship) was a professional non-ranking snooker tournament that took place at the Guild Hall in Preston, England, between 18 November and 4 December 1983. This was the seventh edition of the UK Championship, the sixth staging of the competition in Preston, and the sixth UK Championship to be sponsored by Coral. The televised stages were shown on the BBC from 26 November through to the end of the championship and with an extra day of coverage this year with the final now played on Saturday and Sunday, they started with the last remaining last 16 match between Steve Davis and Willie Thorne before showing the quarter-finals.

Alex Higgins staged a dramatic comeback, recovering from 0–7 down to beat Steve Davis 16–15 in the final, to win his only UK Championship title. The highest break of the tournament was a 139 made by Tony Meo.

== Prize fund ==
The breakdown of prize money for this year is shown below:

- Winner: £12,000
- Runner-up £6,500
- Highest break: £1,000
- Total: £60,000

== Main draw ==
Last 32 Best of 17 frames

(Wales) Terry Griffiths 9–4 Dave Martin (England)

(England) Mike Hallett 9–4 Graham Miles (England)

(England) Joe Johnson 9–6 John Virgo (England)

(England) David Taylor 9–4 Neal Foulds (England)

(England) Tony Knowles 9–5 Tony Jones (England)

(Wales) Doug Mountjoy 9–2 Mike Watterson (England)

(Northern Ireland) Alex Higgins 9–6 Murdo MacLeod (Scotland)

(England) Paul Medati 9–3 Dean Reynolds (England)

(Wales) Cliff Wilson 9–4 Rex Williams (England)

(Wales) Ray Reardon 9–7 Bob Harris (England)

(Northern Ireland) Dennis Taylor 9–6 Tommy Murphy (Northern Ireland)

(England) Jimmy White 9–1 Ian Black (Scotland)

(England) John Spencer 9–7 John Dunning (England)

(England) Tony Meo 9–7 John Parrott (England)

(England) Willie Thorne 9–5 Mark Wildman (England)

(England) Steve Davis 9–1 Geoff Foulds (England)

Round of 16
(Wales) Terry Griffiths	9
(England) Mike Hallett	5
(England) Joe Johnson	9
(England) David Taylor	3
(Northern Ireland) Alex Higgins	9
(England) Paul Medati	1
(England) Tony Knowles	9
(Wales) Doug Mountjoy	5
(England) Jimmy White	9
(Northern Ireland) Dennis Taylor	4
(Wales) Ray Reardon	9
(Wales) Cliff Wilson	4
(England) Tony Meo	9
(England) John Spencer	5
(England) Steve Davis	9
(England) Willie Thorne	3

Quarter-finals
(Wales) Terry Griffiths	9
(England) Joe Johnson	2
(Northern Ireland) Alex Higgins	9
(England) Tony Knowles	5
(England) Jimmy White	9
(Wales) Ray Reardon	4
(England) Tony Meo	4
(England) Steve Davis	9

Semi-finals
(Wales) Terry Griffiths	4
(Northern Ireland) Alex Higgins	9
(England) Jimmy White	4
(England) Steve Davis	9

Final
(Northern Ireland) Alex Higgins	16
(England) Steve Davis	15

== Final ==
Final: Best of 31 frames. Referee: Len Ganley; The Guild Hall, Preston, England, 3 and 4 December 1983.
Alex Higgins; Northern Ireland	16–15	Steve Davis; England
First session: 29–107 (78), 31–86 (84), 62–82 (82), 43–56, 25–84 (54), 14–68 (64), 12–76 (67); Second session: 109–18, 69–41, 110–12 (76), 46–68, 60–35, 76–18 (70), 73–0, 67–21; Third session: 70–29, 0–71, 21–73, 70–57, 38–79 (52), 94–0, 106–9 (62); Fourth session: 73–21, 60–72, 87–34, 86–1 (86), 32–71, 14–58, 22–64, 88–24, 77–0
86	Highest break	84
0	Century breaks	0
4	50+ breaks	7

== Century breaks ==
- 139 – Tony Meo
- 119 – Joe Johnson
- 119 – Paul Medati
- 113 – Tony Knowles
- 108 – Steve Davis
- 108 – Jimmy White
- 101 – Ray Reardon
