= Nescafe Extra Challenge =

Non-ranking snooker tournament

Nescafé Extra Challenge
Tournament information
- Location: Bangkok
- Country: Thailand
- Established: 1991
- Format: Non-ranking event
- Final year: 1993
- Final champion: (England) Ronnie O'Sullivan

The Nescafé Extra Challenge was a non-ranking snooker tournament held in Bangkok, Thailand for two editions with a year's break in between. It involved four players playing each other on a round-robin format with the winner decided on a league basis.

The first tournament was played in 1991, with Joe Johnson taking the title by winning all three of his matches. The event was not played the following season, but returned in 1993, with Ronnie O'Sullivan winning the tournament and collecting his first professional title.

== Winners ==
Year	Winner	Runner-up	Final score	Season
1991	(England) Joe Johnson	(Thailand) James Wattana	Round-Robin	1990/91
1993	(England) Ronnie O'Sullivan	(Thailand) James Wattana	Round-Robin	1992/93
