= 1997 Seniors Pot Black =

Seniors Pot Black
Tournament information
- Dates: Early 1997 (broadcast 3–14 March 1997)
- Venue: Goodwood House
- City: Chichester
- Country: England
- Organisation: WPBSA
- Format: Non-Ranking event
- Highest break: (England) Joe Johnson (57)

Final
- Champion: (England) Joe Johnson
- Runner-up: (Wales) Terry Griffiths
- Score: 2–0

The 1997 Seniors Pot Black was a one-off invitational snooker tournament of the popular series Pot Black. Recording took place during early 1997 and broadcast in March. The tournament was held at Goodwood House in Chichester, Sussex. It featured 12 veteran players in a knock-out system both aged over 40. All matches until the final were one-frame shoot-outs and the final being contested over the best of three frames.

Broadcasts were shown on teatime daily on BBC2 and the series started at 17:30 on Monday 3 March 1997. David Vine presented the programme and Ted Lowe and Clive Everton were the commentators while there were more referees in this event than previously. Alan Chamberlain and John Newton joined long time referee John Williams.

The players were all over 40 years of age. Some had retired from the game and some were still competing in tournaments. All the previous Pot Black champions aged over 40 were there including Ray Reardon, John Spencer and Eddie Charlton. Joe Johnson who never competed in any previous series of Pot Black won the title beating Terry Griffiths 2–0 to become the only champion of Seniors Pot Black.

== Main draw ==
=== Round 1 ===
| Player 1 | Score | Player 2 | Broadcast Date |
|---|---|---|---|
| (England) John Spencer | 47–74 | (Northern Ireland) Dennis Taylor | 3 March 1997 |
| (Wales) Ray Reardon | 80–46 | (England) Willie Thorne | 4 March 1997 |
| (South Africa) Perrie Mans | 30–87 | (England) Joe Johnson | 5 March 1997 |
| (England) Graham Miles | 75–26 | (England) Rex Williams | 6 March 1997 |

Quarter-finals (7-11 March 1997)
(Wales) Doug Mountjoy | 28
(Northern Ireland) Dennis Taylor | 101
(Australia) Eddie Charlton | 31
(England) Joe Johnson | 50
(Canada) Cliff Thorburn | 33
(England) Graham Miles | 63
(Wales) Terry Griffiths | 95
(Wales) Ray Reardon | 40

Semi-finals (12-13 March 1997)
(Northern Ireland) Dennis Taylor | 6
(England) Joe Johnson | 112
(England) Graham Miles | 5
(Wales) Terry Griffiths | 111

Final; Best of 3 frames (14 March 1997)
(England) Joe Johnson | 2
(Wales) Terry Griffiths | 0

== Final ==
Final: Best of 3 frames. Referee: John Williams; Goodwood House, Chichester, England, Early 1997 (Broadcast 14 March 1997).
| Joe Johnson; England | 2–0; Frame scores 85-32, 70–17 | Terry Griffiths; Wales |
