= 1990 Norwich Union Grand Prix =

Norwich Union Grand Prix
Tournament information
- Dates: October 1990
- City: Monte Carlo
- Country: Monaco
- Organisation: WPBSA
- Format: Non-ranking event
- Total prize fund: £60,000
- Winner's share: £25,000

Final
- Champion: (England) John Parrott
- Runner-up: (England) Steve Davis
- Score: 4–2

The 1990 Norwich Union Grand Prix was a professional invitational snooker tournament. The final stages took place in October 1990 in Monte Carlo, Monaco.

John Parrott won the tournament by defeating Steve Davis 4–2 in the final.

== Prize fund ==
The winner of the event received £25,000 from a total prize fund of £60,000. The breakdown of prize money for the event is shown below.

- Winner: £25,000
- Runner-up: £15,000
- Semi-finalists: £5,000
- Quarter-finalists: £2,500

== Main draw ==
Quarter-finals; Best of 7 frames
(England) John Parrott	4
(England) Jimmy White	1
(Scotland) Stephen Hendry	4
(Northern Ireland) Dennis Taylor	1
(England) Steve Davis	4
(England) Mike Hallett	1
(England) Joe Johnson	4
(Wales) Terry Griffiths	2

Semi-finals; Best of 7 frames
(England) John Parrott	4
(Scotland) Stephen Hendry	2
(England) Steve Davis	4
(England) Joe Johnson	2

Final; Best of 7 frames
(England) John Parrott	4
(England) Steve Davis	2
