= Cliff Wilson =

Welsh professional snooker player (1934–1994)

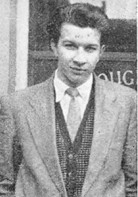
- Wilson in 1955

Personal information
- Born: 10 May 1934 Tredegar, Wales
- Died: 21 May 1994 (aged 60)

Sport
- Country: Wales
- Sport: Snooker
- Professional: 1979–1994
- Highest ranking: 16 (1988–89)
- Best ranking finish: Quarter-final (x5)

Clifford Wilson (10 May 1934 – 21 May 1994) was a Welsh professional snooker player who reached his highest ranking of 16 in 1988–89. He was the 1978 World Amateur Champion and won the 1991 World Seniors Championship. He was a successful junior player, known for his fast attacking snooker and potting ability, and won the British Under-19 Championship in 1951 and 1952. In the early 1950s both Wilson and future six-time World Professional Champion Ray Reardon lived in Tredegar, where they played a succession of money matches that attracted large enthusiastic crowds.

A combination of factors, including Reardon leaving Tredegar, led to Wilson virtually giving up the game from 1957 to 1972, but after being asked to take up a vacant place in a works team, he returned to playing and later became the 1978 World Amateur Champion, achieving his victory with an 11–5 win in the final against Joe Johnson. In 1979 Wilson turned professional, aged 45, and, still playing with an attacking style, reached several ranking tournament quarter-finals during his career. At the inaugural World Seniors Championship in 1991 he beat Eddie Charlton 5–4 in the final to take the title. He won the Welsh Amateur Championship in 1956, 1977 and 1979, and was runner-up in the Welsh Professional Championship in 1981 and 1984. He suffered from a number of health conditions, including poor eyesight, during his career, but continued to play professionally until his death in 1994, aged 60.

== Amateur years ==
Wilson was born on 10 May 1934 and grew up in Tredegar, the same town as his friend and snooker rival Ray Reardon. He learnt to play snooker in a steelworks club-room. Even as a teenager, Wilson was nearly sightless in his left eye. In 1950, aged 16, Wilson was the reigning Welsh boys snooker champion and working as a storekeeper when he reached the final of the British under-19 Championship, where he lost 2–3 to Rex Williams. In the same competition the following year, Wilson (now a steelworker) won the title, defeating Gary Owen 3–2 in the final. In 1952 he beat Owen on his way to reaching the semi-final of the English Amateur Championship, where, using a cue that had been repaired overnight and reduced in length by an inch, he lost to Charles Downey.

Having been called up into the Royal Air Force for his national service, Wilson was granted special leave to participate in the 1952 under-19 Championship. In the final he faced Owen again, this time winning 4–2. A match report of Wilson's 3–1 semi-final win against Donald Scott in the Western Mail said that he played "spectacular snooker ... he had breaks of 20, 25, 30 and 41 all at tremendous speed." In 1954, Wilson was the youngest competitor in the English Amateur Championship and lost 9–11 to Geoff Thompson in the final. He won the Welsh Amateur Championship in 1956. Snooker historian Clive Everton wrote of Wilson's early career that he was "a phenomenal potter: quick, instinctive fearless."

He played Reardon in a succession of money matches in Tredegar. In The Story of Billiards and Snooker, Everton described Wilson as being an "even more remarkable talent" than Reardon, who would go on to win the World Snooker Championship six times between 1969 and 1978. Everton went on to describe their contests, when each would attract hundreds of supporting spectators, as "modern snooker's nearest equivalent to a bare knuckle prize fight." Everton then suggests that when Reardon moved away, "the edge went from Wilson's game." Wilson's father, who had supported his son's snooker career, died at around the time that Reardon moved away, and Wilson also started having problems with his eyesight. Apart from this, snooker's popularity was on the wane during the 1950s and it was extremely difficult to join the small, closed professional circuit. Wilson gave up snooker almost completely, and continued working at the steelworks at Llanwern. From 1957 to 1972 he was retired from snooker apart from participating in a few games in 1960, which included the televised "Snooker Foursomes" in which he partnered John Price.

In 1972 he started playing again when a friend asked him to take a vacant place in a works team in the Newport League. Within two years of starting to play again, he was selected for the Wales team for the 1973–74 Home International series, losing 1–2 against D. Lenehan of Ireland and beating W. McKerron of Scotland 2–1. He was selected again in 1976–77 for the match against Ireland, beating J. Clusker 2–1. In 1977–78 Wales won the series, although Wilson lost two of his three matches, including a 1–2 defeat by 1972 and 1974 World Amateur Champion Ray Edmonds. In the 1978 series Wilson won three of his four matches, including a 3–0 win over the captain of the England team Mike Hallett. In 1977, he won his second Welsh amateur championship, following his earlier win in 1956, beating Dai Thomas 8–1 in the final.

As Welsh Champion, Wilson qualified for the 1978 World Amateur Championship in Malta. He was the only player in the three groups of the round-robin stage to win all of their matches, and then beat Maltese player Joe Grech 5–4 in the quarter-finals. Wilson built a 4–0 lead in front of a 4,000 strong audience that, according to Everton, started to deliberately distract him, as Grech levelled at 4–4 and led 37–0 in the deciding frame. Wilson eventually won the frame, and remained in the pressroom with Everton, guarded by police, until the audience left. He beat Kirk Stevens 8–2 in the semi-final and then Joe Johnson 11–5 in the final to take the title.

Following his world amateur championship win, Wilson was invited to participate in the 1979 Masters. He would have been the first amateur to play in the Masters, but withdrew due to a threatened boycott by professional players. He lost 5–8 in the southern area final of the English Amateur Championship to Jimmy White after leading 4–2. 1979 also saw him win the Welsh Amateur Championship for the third time, defeating Geoff Thomas 8–5 in the final; and take the National Pairs championship title with Steve Newbury.

== Professional career ==
Wilson turned professional in 1979 at the age of 45, and won his first match, 9–7 against John Pulman in the 1979 UK Championship, before losing 4–9 to Terry Griffiths in the following round. In his debut World Snooker Championship in 1980, he beat Frank Jonik 9–7 in qualifying and lost 6–10 to Doug Mountjoy in the first round. In the 1980–81 season, he reached the final of the 1981 Welsh Professional Championship, losing 6–9 to Reardon. He beat Roy Andrewartha and Eddie Sinclair, both 9–4, in qualifying for the 1981 World Snooker Championship and then was beaten 6–10 by David Taylor in the first round. In 1981–82 he again lost in the first round of the world championship, 5–10 to Eddie Charlton. Wilson was the runner-up at the Pontins Spring Open in consecutive years, losing 3–7 to Willie Thorne in 1980 and 2–7 to John Hargreaves in 1981.

With wins over Johnson, Mountjoy and White, Wilson reached his first ranking tournament quarter-final at the 1982 International Open, losing 4–5 to the eventual champion Tony Knowles. He next reached a ranking quarter final at the 1985 Grand Prix, with further losing quarter-final appearances at the 1986 International Open, 1987 classic, and 1989 International Open.

He broke into the top sixteen of the world rankings for one season, 1988/89, ranked 16th. This ranking entitled him to a place at the 1989 Masters, where he came back from 0-2 down to level at 2–2 against reigning World Champion and defending Masters Champion Steve Davis before Davis went on to win 5–2.

He later went on to win the first World Seniors Championship in 1991, beating Charlton 5–4 in the final after earlier victories over Mountjoy and Griffiths. Charlton had led 4–2 and needed only to pot the blue and pink for the match, but Wilson took three frames in a row to win his first professional title at the age of 57 and collect £16,000, his highest prize winnings.

He recorded wins over a number of prominent players as a professional. In January 1992 he beat Ken Doherty 5–2 in the 1992 Welsh Open before losing 1–5 to Darren Morgan. Later that year he played a young Ronnie O'Sullivan in the 1992 UK Championship, winning 9–8. Both Doherty and O'Sullivan won the respective tournaments the following year. The highest break of his career was 136 at the 1989 Grand Prix.

His popular exhibition matches were advertised with the phrase "You've never seen anything like it!" He was known as a fast, attacking, player and has been described as an "outstanding potter" both by Everton and by snooker writer Ian Morrison. In 1953, a Sports Argus match report described Wilson as having "lived up to his reputation as the finest potter in the country, one ball being hardly in the pocket before the next one was following it in." Wilson's obituary in The Times noted that in the 1950s he was seen as a "phenomenal talent" and played an attacking game that was unlike the defensive approach generally prevalent at the time, and Eurosport's Desmond Kane included him in a 2020 list of the ten "greatest long potters". Jack Karnehm in 1981 wrote that Wilson was "probably the hardest hitter of a ball on earth. His high-speed accurate potting has to be seen to be believed" and added "it is said that the last time he played a safety shot was in 1959 and that was by mistake."

== Personal life ==
He was married to Valerie Wilson, and had four sons, including twins. Towards the end of his life, Wilson suffered from a number of health problems with his back, knee and heart, eventually developing an inoperable disease of the liver and pancreas that led to his death. He continued to play professionally, recording a century break in the 1994 International Open in January 1994.

Wilson died on 21 May 1994, aged 60.

== Performance and rankings timeline ==
Tournament	1979/ 80	1980/ 81	1981/ 82	1982/ 83	1983/ 84	1984/ 85	1985/ 86	1986/ 87	1987/ 88	1988/ 89	1989/ 90	1990/ 91	1991/ 92	1992/ 93	1993/ 94
Ranking	(Note: He was an amateur.)	UR	23	26	20	23	22	23	17	16	18	28	32	33	47
Ranking tournaments
Dubai Classic (Note: The event was also called the Dubai Masters (1988/1989))	Tournament Not Held									NR	2R	1R	1R	LQ	LQ
Grand Prix (Note: The event was also called the Professional Players Tournament (1982/93–1983/1984))	Not Held			3R	3R	2R	QF	2R	3R	3R	1R	2R	2R	2R	LQ
UK Championship	Non-Ranking Event					2R	1R	1R	2R	2R	2R	2R	1R	3R	1R
European Open	Tournament Not Held									2R	1R	3R	1R	LQ	LQ
Welsh Open	Tournament Not Held												3R	LQ	LQ
International Open (Note: The event was also called the Goya Matchroom Trophy (1985/1986))	Not Held		NR	QF	LQ	LQ	3R	QF	2R	1R	QF	Not Held		1R	1R
Thailand Open (Note: The event was also called the Thailand Masters (1983/1984–1986/1987) and Asian Open (1989/1990–1992/1993))	Tournament Not Held				Non-Ranking Event				Not Held		1R	2R	1R	LQ	LQ
British Open (Note: The event was also called the British Gold Cup (1979/1980), Yamaha Organs Trophy (1980/1981) and International Masters (1981/1982–1983/1984))	Non-Ranking Event					1R	2R	3R	2R	3R	1R	1R	1R	LQ	LQ
World Championship	1R	1R	1R	1R	LQ	LQ	1R	LQ	1R	1R	1R	LQ	LQ	LQ	LQ
Non-ranking tournaments
The Masters	A	A	A	A	A	A	A	A	A	1R	A	LQ	WD	LQ	A
Pontins Professional	A	SF	A	A	QF	QF	SF	QF	A	QF	SF	QF	A	A	A
Former ranking tournaments
Canadian Masters (Note: The event was also called the Canadian Open (1979/1980–1980/1981))	NR		Tournament Not Held				Non-Ranking			2R	Tournament Not Held				
Hong Kong Open (Note: The event was also called the Australian Masters (1979/1980–1987/1988))	Non-Ranking									NH	WD	Tournament Not Held			
Classic	Non-Ranking Event				1R	2R	1R	QF	2R	2R	1R	2R	2R	Not Held	
Strachan Open	Non-Ranking Event												2R	Not Held	
Former non-ranking tournaments
International Open (Note: The event was also called the Goya Matchroom Trophy (1985/1986))	Not Held		LQ	Ranking Event								Not Held		Ranking	
Classic	A	A	A	1R	Ranking Event										
Pontins Brean Sands	Not Held			RR	Tournament Not Held										
British Open (Note: The event was also called the British Gold Cup (1979/1980), Yamaha Organs Trophy (1980/1981) and International Masters (1981/1982–1983/1984))	LQ	LQ	LQ	RR	LQ	Ranking Event									
Shoot-Out	Tournament Not Held											1R	Not Held		
Welsh Professional Championship	SF	F	SF	SF	F	SF	SF	QF	SF	QF	QF	QF	Not Held		
World Seniors Championship	Tournament Not Held												W	Not Held	

Performance Table Legend
LQ	lost in the qualifying draw	#R	lost in the early rounds of the tournament (WR = Wildcard round, RR = Round robin)	QF	lost in the quarter-finals
SF	lost in the semi-finals	F	lost in the final	W	won the tournament
DNQ	did not qualify for the tournament	A	did not participate in the tournament	WD	withdrew from the tournament

NH / Not Held	means an event was not held.
NR / Non-Ranking Event	means an event is/was no longer a ranking event.
R / Ranking Event	means an event is/was a ranking event.

== Career finals ==
=== Non-ranking finals: 2 ===
Outcome	No.	Year	Championship	Opponent in the final	Score	Ref.
Runner-up	1.	1981	Welsh Professional Championship	Ray Reardon (WAL)	6–9	
Runner-up	2.	1984	Welsh Professional Championship (2)	Doug Mountjoy (WAL)	3–9	

=== Pro-am finals: 4 (1 title) ===
Outcome	No.	Year	Championship	Opponent in the final	Score	Ref.
Winner	1.	1976	Pontins Autumn Open	Paul Medati (ENG)	7–4	
Runner-up	1.	1980	Pontins Spring Open	Willie Thorne (ENG)	3–7	
Runner-up	2.	1981	Pontins Spring Open (2)	John Hargreaves (ENG)	2–7	
Runner-up	3.	1981	William Younger Open	Joe Johnson (ENG)	7–8	

=== Amateur finals: 8 (6 titles) ===
Outcome	No.	Year	Championship	Opponent in the final	Score	Ref.
Runner-up	1.	1950	British Under-19 Championship	Rex Williams (ENG)	2–3	
Winner	1.	1951	British Under-19 Championship	Marcus Owen (WAL)	3–2	
Winner	2.	1952	British Under-19 Championship (2)	Marcus Owen (WAL)	4–2	
Runner-up	1.	1954	English Amateur Championship	Geoff Thompson (ENG)	9–11	
Winner	1.	1956	Welsh Amateur Championship	V. Wilkins (WAL)	Unknown	
Winner	2.	1977	Welsh Amateur Championship (2)	Dai Thomas (WAL)	8–1	
Winner	3.	1978	World Amateur Championship	Joe Johnson (ENG)	11–5	
Winner	4.	1979	Welsh Amateur Championship (3)	Geoff Thomas (WAL)	8–5	

=== Seniors finals: 1 (1 title) ===
Outcome	No.	Year	Championship	Opponent in the final	Score	Ref.
Winner	1.	1991	World Seniors Championship	Eddie Charlton (AUS)	5–4	
