= 1989 Norwich Union Grand Prix =

Norwich Union Grand Prix
Tournament information
- Dates: 20 May – 12 November 1989
- City: Monte Carlo
- Country: Monaco
- Organisation: WPBSA
- Format: Non-ranking event
- Total prize fund: £50,000
- Winner's share: £20,000
- Highest break: Mike Hallett (ENG) (137)

Final
- Champion: (England) Joe Johnson
- Runner-up: (Scotland) Stephen Hendry
- Score: 5–3

The 1989 Norwich Union Grand Prix was a professional invitational snooker tournament, which took place between 20 May and 12 November 1989.

The tournament comprised four qualifying rounds, which took place in Strasbourg, Lyon, Paris and Brussels, with the winner of each going through to the semi-finals of the final tournament held in Monte Carlo, Monaco. Joe Johnson won the tournament beating Stephen Hendry 5–3 in the final.

== Prize fund ==
The breakdown of prize money for this year is shown below:

- Winner: £20,000
- Runner-up: £10,000
- Semi-final: £5,000
- Quarter-final: £2,500
- Total: £50,000

== Main draw ==
Quarter-finals; Best of 9 frames
(England) Joe Johnson	5
(Wales) Doug Mountjoy	4
(England) John Parrott	5
(England) Mike Hallett	4
(Scotland) Stephen Hendry	5
(England) John Virgo	0
(England) Tony Knowles	5
(England) Martin Clark	3

Semi-finals; Best of 7 frames
(England) Joe Johnson	4
(England) John Parrott	3
(Scotland) Stephen Hendry	4
(England) Tony Knowles	0

Final; Best of 9 frames
(England) Joe Johnson	5
(Scotland) Stephen Hendry	3
