= 1989 New Zealand Masters =

New Zealand Masters
Tournament information
- Dates: 3–6 August 1989
- Venue: New Zealand Parliament
- City: Wellington
- Country: New Zealand
- Organisation: WPBSA
- Format: Non-ranking event
- Winner's share: £13,000
- Highest break: (England) Willie Thorne, 137

Final
- Champion: (England) Willie Thorne
- Runner-up: (England) Joe Johnson
- Score: 7–4

The 1989 Lion Brown New Zealand Masters was a professional invitational snooker tournament which took place in August 1989 at the Legislative Chamber of the New Zealand Parliament in Wellington, New Zealand.

Willie Thorne won the tournament beating Joe Johnson 7–4 in the final.

== Main draw ==
Quarter-finals; Best of 11 frames		Semi-finals; Best of 11 frames		Final; Best of 13 frames
(England) Willie Thorne	6
(Northern Ireland) Dennis Taylor	5	(England) Willie Thorne	6
(Scotland) Stephen Hendry	6	(Scotland) Stephen Hendry	5
(New Zealand) Dene O'Kane	3			(England) Willie Thorne	7
(England) Joe Johnson	6			(England) Joe Johnson	4
(England) Mike Hallett	5	(England) Joe Johnson	6
(England) Tony Knowles	6	(England) Tony Knowles	3
(England) John Parrott	3

- Third place match: (England) Tony Knowles 6–3 Stephen Hendry (Scotland)
