= 1991 Nescafe Extra Challenge =

Nescafé Extra Challenge
Tournament information
- Dates: March 1991
- Country: Thailand
- Format: Non-ranking event
- Winner's share: £10,500
- Highest break: Tony Drago (MLT) (142)

Final
- Champion: (England) Joe Johnson
- Runner-up: (Thailand) James Wattana
- Score: Round-Robin

The 1991 Nescafé Extra Challenge was a professional non-ranking snooker tournament that was played in Bangkok, Thailand in March 1991. The event featured four professional players - Tony Drago, Joe Johnson, Alain Robidoux and James Wattana - and was played in a round-robin format. Johnson won all three of his matches and took the title, with Wattana finishing in second place. Drago compiled the highest break of the tournament, 142.

== Results ==
If points were level then most frames won determined their positions.

POS	Player	MP	MW	ML	FW	FL	FD	PTS
Winner	(England) Joe Johnson	3	3	0	15	7	+8	6
Runner-up	(Thailand) James Wattana	3	2	1	11	9	+2	4
3	(Canada) Alain Robidoux	3	1	2	11	10	+1	2
4	(Malta) Tony Drago	3	0	3	4	15	-11	0

- (Canada) Alain Robidoux 5 – 0 (Malta) Tony Drago
- (England) Joe Johnson 5 – 1 (Thailand) James Wattana
- (England) Joe Johnson 5 – 3 (Canada) Alain Robidoux
- (Thailand) James Wattana 5 – 1 (Malta) Tony Drago
- (England) Joe Johnson 5 – 3 (Malta) Tony Drago
- (Thailand) James Wattana 5 – 3 (Canada) Alain Robidoux
