= Joe Johnson (snooker player) =

English snooker player (born 1952)

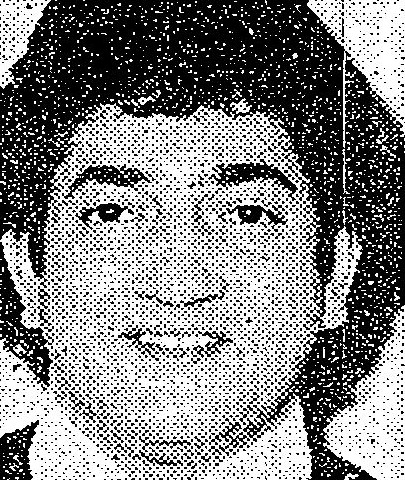
- Johnson in 1988

Personal information
- Nickname: The Shoe
- Born: 29 July 1952 (age 74) Bradford, England

Sport
- Country: England
- Sport: Snooker
- Professional: 1979–2004
- Highest ranking: 5 (1987–88)

Tournament wins
- Ranking: 1
- World Championship: 1986

Joseph Johnson (born Joseph Malik, 29 July 1952) is an English former professional snooker player and a snooker commentator for Eurosport. As an amateur, he became the British under-19 champion in 1971, defeating George Crimes in the final. He turned professional in 1979, having reached the finals of both the English Amateur Championship and the World Amateur Championship the previous year. He appeared in his first ranking final at the 1983 Professional Players Tournament, where he was runner-up to Tony Knowles, and he progressed to the semi-finals of the 1985 Classic.

With first-round losses in his two previous World Snooker Championship appearances, Johnson started off as a 150‍–‍1 outsider at the 1986 World Championship. He defeated Terry Griffiths 13‍–‍12 in the quarter-finals, Knowles 16‍–‍8 in the semi-finals, and Steve Davis 18‍–‍12 in the final to win the world title, the only ranking title of his career. As the defending champion in 1987, he defeated Stephen Hendry 13‍–‍12 in the quarter-finals and Neal Foulds 16‍–‍9 in the semi-finals, before losing 14‍–‍18 to Davis in the final. After reaching two consecutive World Championship finals, Johnson subsequently won only one match in the main stage of the competition, defeating Cliff Wilson in the first round in 1988.

His best performances in the other two Triple Crown events were a semi-final appearance at the 1987 UK Championship where he lost 4‍–‍9 to Jimmy White, and another at the 1988 Masters where he lost 3‍–‍6 to Davis. Having reached a career high of fifth place in the 1987–88 snooker world rankings, he dropped out of the world's top 16 after the 1989‍–‍90 season. Johnson made his last Crucible appearance at the 1991 World Championship, losing in the first round to Dennis Taylor. Johnson continued playing on the professional tour until 2005, when he retired at age 53 after breaking his ankle. He later competed in seniors events and won the 2019 Seniors Masters.

== Early life and amateur career ==
Joseph Malik was born on 29 July 1952, in Bradford, England. His mother's name was Margaret, and his father was engineer Malik Farooq, who was Pakistani and died in 1974. The couple separated when Joe was four years old. Margaret later married Ken Johnson, and Joe's surname was changed to Johnson. Ken encouraged his stepson to play snooker after he had become interested in the game at the age of about seven, and bought him a small table when he was 11. Johnson started playing on full-size tables four years later. Johnson became the national under-19 champion in 1971, defeating George Crimes 3‍–‍0 in the final, and was Yorkshire champion three times.

He set a record in 1978 for the highest break compiled by an amateur player, recording a 140 break at the TUC Club in Middlesbrough. The same year, after finishing second to Terry Griffiths in the English Amateur Championship, Johnson represented England at the World Amateur Snooker Championship in Malta. He reached the final, where he was defeated 5‍–‍11 by Cliff Wilson; they were level at five frames each after the first session, but Wilson won six consecutive frames for the victory. Johnson made the highest break of the tournament, a 101.

In 1979, he was accepted as a professional snooker player by the World Professional Billiards and Snooker Association along with Wilson, Tony Meo and Mike Hallett. Before taking up snooker professionally, Johnson worked as an apprentice motor mechanic and as a gasfitter.

== Professional career ==
=== Early years ===
Johnson achieved little success in his early professional career. At the 1979 Canadian Open, he was exempted until the fifth round and defeated Steve Baruda 5‍–‍4 after making a 100 break in the first frame. He defeated John Bear 9‍–‍7 in the next round but then lost 2‍–‍9 to Kirk Stevens in the last 16. Johnson won the billiards competition that was running alongside the snooker event, defeating Ian Williamson 500‍–‍284 in the final.

At the 1980 World Championship, he defeated Roy Andrewartha 9‍–‍5 in the first round of qualifying but lost his next match 6‍–‍9 to Pat Houlihan. At the 1981 World Championship, he took a 4‍–‍3 lead against Tony Meo after the first session but lost in the deciding frame.

In the 1981–82 season, Johnson progressed through several rounds of the 1981 Jameson International. After beating Jim Donnelly 5‍–‍4 and Murdo MacLeod 5‍–‍1, he received a walkover against John Pulman. He next defeated Jim Wych 5‍–‍2 but then lost 3‍–‍5 to Graham Miles in the last 24.

He began the 1981 UK Championship with a 9–1 win against Tommy Murphy, followed by a 9‍–‍3 defeat of Mike Watterson and a 9‍–‍4 win against Cliff Wilson. In the next round, he beat the former world champion John Spencer 9‍–‍5, earning himself a last-16 tie against another former world champion, Ray Reardon, to whom he lost 7‍–‍9. Johnson defeated Vic Harris 9‍–‍4 in the qualifying rounds of the 1982 World Championship and reached the last 48, where he lost 8‍–‍9 to Mike Hallett.

=== 1982–1985: Ranking event finalist ===
In the qualifying competition for the 1982 Jameson International, Johnson received a walkover against John Phillips and then faced Cliff Wilson, losing 4‍–‍5 after building a 4‍–‍2 lead. He won the first ranking points of his career in October 1982, at the Professional Players Tournament, where he followed a 5‍–‍1 win against Graham Miles with a 5‍–‍1 win against sixth-ranked Kirk Stevens and a 5‍–‍4 win against Mark Wildman in the last 16. He took the first frame of the quarter-final against John Virgo but then lost five in a row to be defeated 1‍–‍5. As one of six players outside the world's "top eight" to have progressed furthest in the tournament, Johnson was awarded a place at the 1983 Masters; however, he lost his opening match 2‍–‍5 to Cliff Thorburn. At the 1983 World Championship, he recorded a 10‍–‍0 whitewash against Paul Watchorn in the first round of qualifying but then lost 8‍–‍10 to Wilson, missing his chance to reach the main stage of the event.

For the 1983–84 season, Johnson's points from the previous season placed him 23rd in the world rankings. He defeated Dennis Hughes 5‍–‍1 in the last 48 of the 1983 International Open, before losing 2‍–‍5 to Eddie Charlton in the last 32. He began the untelevised 1983 Professional Players Tournament with a 5‍–‍3 win against Pascal Burke, also defeating Jimmy White 5‍–‍3 and Charlton 5‍–‍0. He then beat Thorburn 5‍–‍1 in the quarter-finals and Tony Meo 9‍–‍6 in the semi-finals to reach his first major final, where he faced Tony Knowles. From 1‍–‍6 down, Johnson compiled a 135 break (the highest of the tournament) and levelled the match at 8‍–‍8, but Knowles secured the deciding frame for the title.

Johnson reached the quarter-finals of the 1983 UK Championship by defeating Matt Gibson and Virgo, both 9‍–‍6, and David Taylor 9‍–‍3. In the quarter-final against Terry Griffiths, which was Johnson's first televised match as a professional, he lost the first seven frames and was defeated 2‍–‍9. At the qualifying event for the 1984 World Championship, he won his encounter with Gibson 10‍–‍3 to earn his debut in the main competition at the Crucible Theatre, where he met Dennis Taylor in the first round for a 1‍–‍10 defeat.

Ranked 19th at the start of the 1984‍–‍85 season, Johnson recorded a 3‍–‍1 quarter-final win against Mick Fisher at the 1984 Costa Del Sol Classic, but he lost 2‍–‍3 to Dennis Taylor in the semi-finals. At the 1984 International Open, after beating Mario Morra 5‍–‍0 and Charlton 5‍–‍1, he was defeated again by Taylor, losing 2‍–‍5 in the last 16. At his next ranking event, the 1984 Grand Prix, Johnson defeated Paul Medati 5‍–‍1 but lost 4‍–‍5 to Ian Williamson in the last 32. He began the 1984 UK Championship by defeating John Rea 9‍–‍6, and John Spencer by the same score in the last 32, before losing 2‍–‍9 to Stevens in the last 16. At the 1985 Mercantile Credit Classic, he defeated Ray Edmonds and Knowles to reach the last 16, where he whitewashed Wilson 5‍–‍0 to achieve his first televised match victory after three defeats in other events. He then progressed to the semi-finals after a 5‍–‍3 win against Warren King. According to Janice Hale of The Daily Telegraph, Johnson "failed to reproduce any of the fighting form which he displayed in the final of last season's Professional Players Tournament" as he lost 2‍–‍9 to Thorburn.

In 1985, Johnson competed in the main stage of the World Championship for the second time, after defeating Geoff Foulds 10‍–‍6 in qualifying. He played Bill Werbeniuk in the first round; having not won a match all season, Werbeniuk made a 143 break in the tenth frame—the third-highest break ever recorded at the championship at that time—and defeated Johnson 10‍–‍8.

=== 1986 World Champion ===
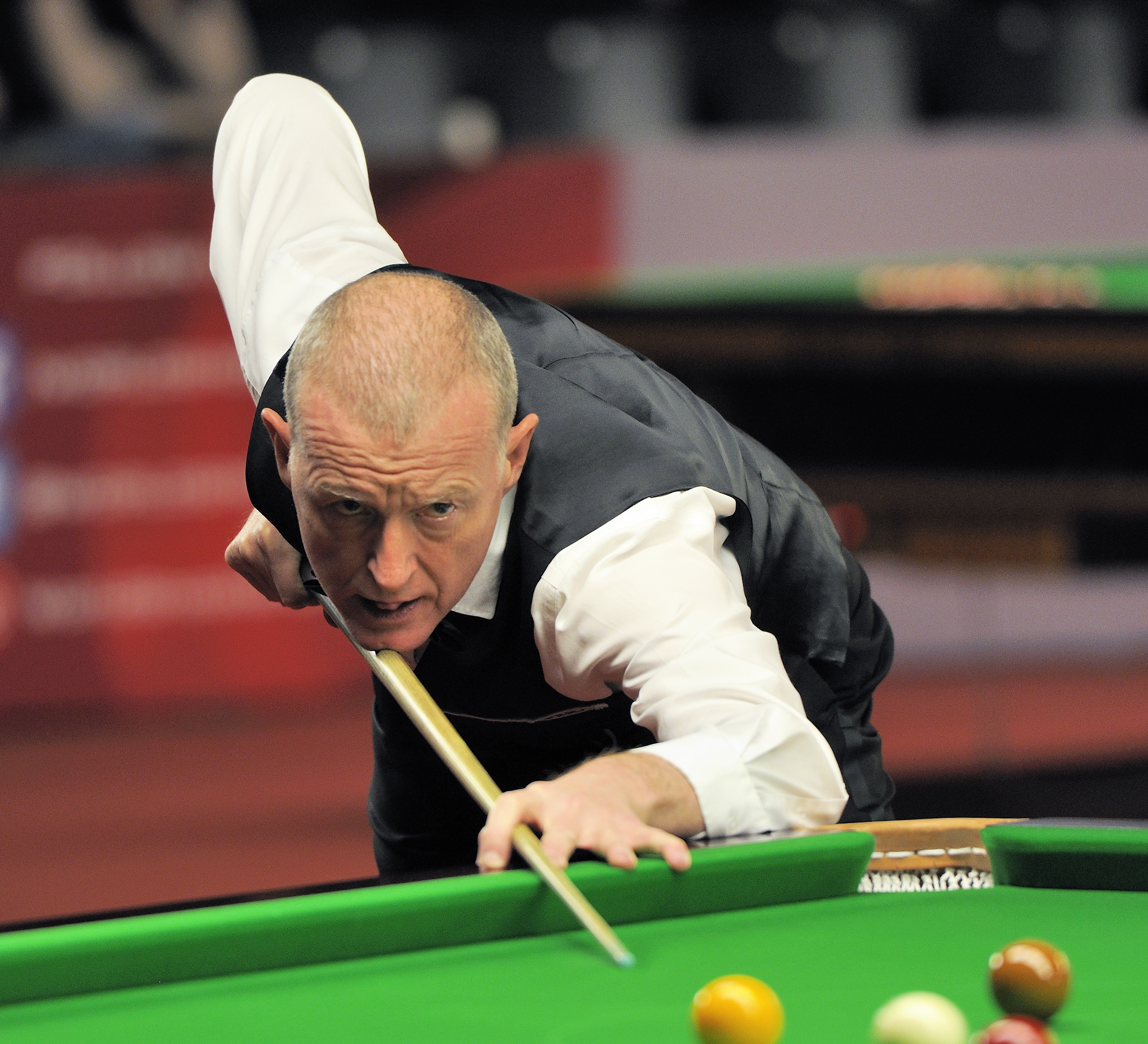
Johnson defeated three-time world champion Steve Davis (pictured in 2014) to win the 1986 World Championship.

Johnson began the 1985–86 season ranked 16th, inside the top 16 for the first time in his career. He was relatively unheralded at the start of the 1986 World Championship, having only ever won one televised match. Johnson was rated a 150‍–‍1 outsider going into the championship, his only two previous Crucible appearances having ended in first-round defeats. His best results during the season had been quarter-final finishes at the 1985 Matchroom Trophy (where he lost 3‍–‍5 to Neal Foulds) and at the 1986 Classic (where he lost 4‍–‍5 to Cliff Thorburn).

He defeated Dave Martin 10–3 in the first round, for his first win in three appearances at the main stage of the World Championship. In the second round, he took a 5‍–‍3 lead against Mike Hallett after the first session, eventually winning the match 13‍–‍6. He then met former world champion Terry Griffiths in the quarter-finals; Johnson was leading 9‍–‍7 before the final session, but Griffiths won five straight frames to lead 12‍–‍9; Johnson took the next four frames (including two century breaks) to triumph 13‍–‍12. He defeated Tony Knowles in the semi-finals, despite being in severe pain from a cyst on his back, winning the last two frames of the match for a 16‍–‍8 victory. Leading by 7‍–‍5 at the halfway point, Johnson was in so much pain that he very nearly conceded the match, and a doctor had to be called in to administer pain relief.

His opponent in the final was world number one Steve Davis, this being their first professional match against one another. Davis—who had already won the World Championship three times—was considered highly likely to win the title, as reflected in the bookmakers' odds of 2‍–‍9 for Davis and 5‍–‍1 for Johnson. Davis won three of the first four frames, compiling century breaks of 108 and 107. Johnson responded by taking the next three frames to finish the first session 4‍–‍3 ahead. Davis started the second session by winning four frames in a row to lead 7‍–‍4. Johnson won four consecutive frames after the mid-session interval, before Davis clinched the last frame of the session to leave the match level at 8‍–‍8 overnight.

On the second day of the final, Johnson wore an unusual pair of red, pink and white leather shoes, subsequently gaining the nickname "The Shoe". Resuming the match, he won another run of four frames to take a 12‍–‍8 lead. Gordon Burn wrote in his book Pocket Money (1986), "From the beginning of the third session he played an open game full of flair and daring and the length-of-the-table, long-potting which had been so characteristic of Steve Davis in the days when he was still making his name." The session concluded with Johnson ahead 13‍–‍11. In the final session of the match, the crowd appeared to favour Johnson, who had played with an attacking style throughout the tournament. After winning three of the next four frames to lead 16‍–‍12 at the interval, he added frame 29 and compiled a break of 64 in frame 30 to win the match 18‍–‍12. Claiming the world title helped to lift Johnson from 16th place in the world rankings to eighth for 1986‍–‍87.

When he was not playing in a match, Johnson was seen at the tournament wearing a T-shirt with the slogan "Bradford's Bouncing Back"—a reference to the Bradford City stadium fire a year earlier. His victory at the World Championship led to an appearance on the television show Wogan and a personal appearance accompanying pop star Cliff Richard to watch Wimbledon.

Writing in 2008, the historian Alwyn W. Turner called Johnson's defeat of Steve Davis in the final "the biggest upset that snooker had witnessed". Soon after the match, former world champions Dennis Taylor and Ray Reardon both expressed the sentiment that Johnson's win would benefit snooker because he was unfamiliar to most viewers, who would welcome a new champion. The sportswriter Peter Arnold agreed that "the public took to [Johnson] immediately" and found him relatable. In 1986, snooker was the most-covered sport on UK television, with 394 hours of broadcast time, ahead of cricket with 336 hours. A British Market Research Bureau survey that year found that 60% of respondents were interested in watching snooker on television, with athletics placed second at 46%. The 1986 world final was watched by an average of 11.4 million viewers, peaking at 15.6 million. Although he initially seemed comfortable with the attention garnered by winning the title, Johnson had difficulty dealing with the pressures of World Championship fame.

=== Post-World Championship win ===
As reigning world champion in 1986‍–‍87, Johnson had a poor season in terms of results prior to the World Championship, his best finish in a ranking tournament being the last 16 of the British Open. By his own admission, he arrived at the Crucible to defend his title with the mere hope of simply progressing past the first round. Defying expectations, however, he reached the final for the second year in a row. He narrowly defeated Eugene Hughes in the first round, their match concluding with a final-frame decider. He followed this with a 13‍–‍7 win against Murdo MacLeod and a 13‍–‍12 win against 18-year-old Stephen Hendry in the quarter-finals. He then achieved a 16‍–‍9 semi-final victory against Neal Foulds to earn a place in the final, where his opponent was once again Steve Davis.

After taking a 4–3 lead in the first session, Johnson had fallen behind 7‍–‍9 by the end of the second. Davis increased his advantage to 14‍–‍9 at the start of day two, but Johnson then took the last frame of the third session and the first three frames of the concluding session to move within one frame of his opponent, at 13‍–‍14. Johnson missed an attempted long pot early in frame 28, before Davis took the frame and the next two for an 18‍–‍14 victory. Davis said in his post-match interview, "For Joe to come to the Crucible and play as if he hadn't had the season he has had was tremendous really." Johnson praised Davis, as he had after the 1986 final, and said of his own year as champion: "It only seemed five minutes when I walked out to play Steve again in the final, but with all the personal appearances it just seemed to go on and on."

Johnson is one of only two first-time world champions to have reached the final at the Crucible the following season, the other being the 1997 champion Ken Doherty, who was runner-up in 1998. Johnson came within four frames of retaining his crown in 1987, while Doherty came within six, at 12‍–‍18, meaning that Johnson has come closer than any other player to breaking the so-called "Crucible curse" (which relates to the fact that no first-time world champion has ever successfully defended their title since the event moved to the Crucible in 1977).

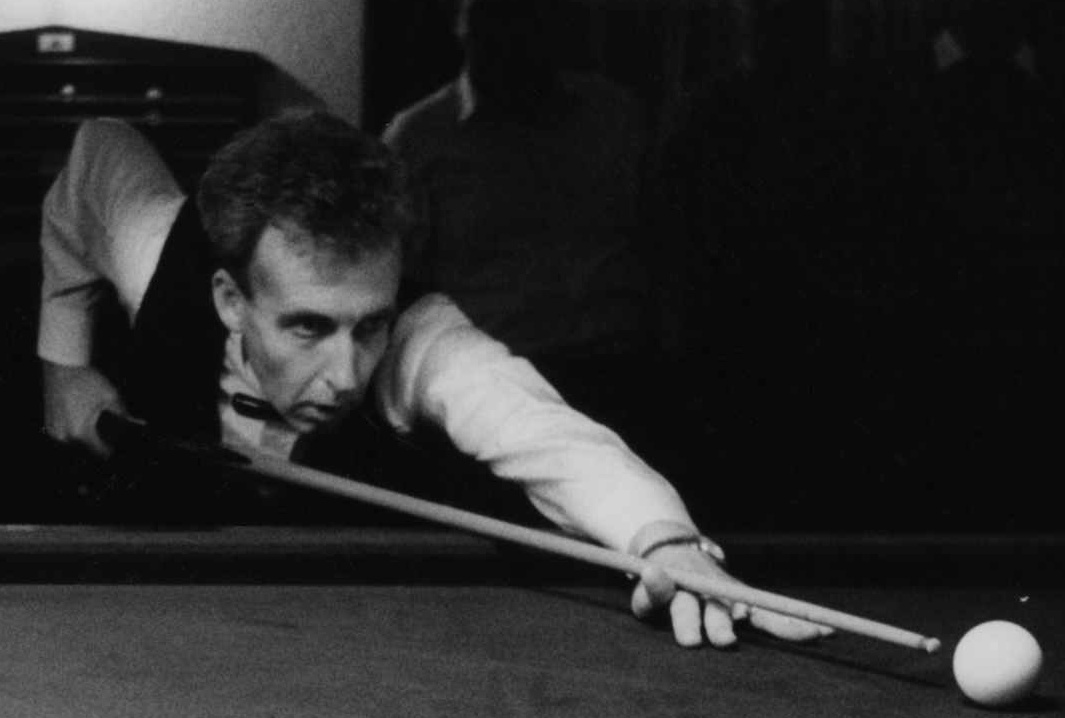
Johnson defeated Terry Griffiths (pictured in 1991) to win the 1987 Scottish Masters.

In the 1987–88 season, Johnson reached fifth place in the world rankings based on his results from the two preceding seasons, largely owing to his performances at the Crucible. In 1987, he was runner-up to Dennis Taylor in the four-player Carling Challenge, and he won the Scottish Masters by overcoming Terry Griffiths 9‍–‍7 in the final for the only other major title of his professional career. Later that year, he reached the semi-finals of the UK Championship, where he came close to achieving a maximum break against Jimmy White but missed the pink ball on 134, eventually losing the match 4‍–‍9. In January 1988, Johnson won matches against Willie Thorne and White to progress to the semi-finals of the Masters, where he was defeated 3‍–‍6 by Davis. After beating Cliff Wilson 10‍–‍7 in the first round of the 1988 World Championship, he won six straight frames to recover from 3‍–‍11 to 9‍–‍11 against Steve James in the second round, before losing the next two frames and the match.

Dropping six places to 11th in the 1988‍–‍89 season, Johnson's best showing in a ranking tournament was reaching the quarter-finals of the Fidelity International Open. He lost 5‍–‍10 to Tony Meo in the first round of the 1989 World Championship. In the 1989‍–‍90 season, he was runner-up to Thorne in the invitational New Zealand Masters. His best ranking-tournament performance was at the Rothmans Grand Prix, where he whitewashed White 5‍–‍0 in a run to the quarter-finals. Johnson won the invitational Norwich Union Grand Prix by defeating Hendry 5‍–‍3 in the final. He finished the season by losing 8‍–‍10 to Darren Morgan in the opening round of the 1990 World Championship.

=== Later career ===
Ranked 18th, Johnson began the 1990‍–‍91 season outside the top 16 for the first time in five years, and he failed to progress to the quarter-finals in any of the ranking events that season. He won the 1991 Nescafé Extra Challenge (a four-player round-robin event) with victories in all three of his matches, against Tony Drago, James Wattana and Alain Robidoux. He qualified for the 1991 World Championship but lost 6‍–‍10 to Dennis Taylor in the first round, this being his final appearance at the main stage of the championship. Despite having heart and eye problems during the 1990s, Johnson continued playing on the professional snooker circuit. After having his first heart attack in 1991, he was given medical advice to retire from the sport as the pressure of competitive matches could increase the likelihood of another attack.

In 1991, Johnson reached the quarter-finals of the Grand Prix by defeating Warren King in the last 64, Tony Jones in the last 32, and Mike Hallett in the last 16, before losing 3‍–‍5 to Nigel Bond. He was runner-up to Stephen Hendry in the 1992 European Challenge, and he narrowly missed qualifying for the 1992 World Championship when he lost 9‍–‍10 to Mick Price on the pink ball in their deciding frame.

Johnson needed only one match win to qualify for the 1993 World Championship, but he lost 6‍–‍10 to Karl Payne in the last 48. In his next five attempts to qualify for the championship, he won just one match: a 10‍–‍5 victory against Matthew Couch in 1995. Although he failed to reach the last 48 of the World Championship again after 1993, he did win three qualifying matches in 2003. He broke his ankle in a fall at home before the start of the 2003‍–‍04 season, which prevented him from competing in any events until the World Championship qualifying in February 2004. Trailing 0‍–‍9, Johnson conceded to Ian Preece in their best-of-19-frames match. He played his last professional match the following month in the qualifying rounds of the 2004 Players Championship, where he lost 3‍–‍5 to Stuart Mann. Johnson retired in 2005, aged 53, the oldest player on the professional snooker circuit at the time.

=== Seniors events ===
Johnson won the Seniors Pot Black trophy in 1997. At the 2000 World Seniors Masters (a one-frame-format event), he was knocked out in the first round by the eventual champion Willie Thorne. He promoted the revival of the World Seniors Championship in 2010, losing 0‍–‍2 to Steve Davis in his opening match. In April 2019, he won the World Seniors Masters at the Crucible by defeating Jimmy White, Aaron Canavan and Barry Pinches; all three matches were decided on a re-spotted black, used as a tiebreaker at 1‍–‍1 rather than playing a third frame. After losing 0‍–‍3 to Australian player Adrian Ridley in the first round of the 2023 World Seniors Championship, he lost 1‍–‍3 to Pinches at the same stage of the 2024 edition.

== Retrospective commentary ==
In their 2005 book about snooker world champions, Luke Williams and Paul Gadsby wrote of Johnson: "His attacking style and ability to crash in long pots [...] prefigured the tactical approach that would dominate snooker from the 1990s into the new millennium." In his 2012 book Black Farce and Cue Ball Wizards, Clive Everton wrote that Johnson "produced an unstoppable surge of inspiration [in 1986]" but "never sustained such form before and never sustained it again". Steve Davis reflected in 2015 that although Johnson was "naturally gifted" and had a "wonderful flowing style with a beautiful touch", he seemed less motivated than others, and Davis saw him as "too nice to be a relentless winner".

The snooker journalist Hector Nunns wrote in 2017 that Johnson would always be remembered for "his shot-making, his shoes, his extra-curricular singing, and his sheer joie de vivre in the match that defined his career". In his 2023 autobiography Unbreakable, Ronnie O'Sullivan recalled watching the 1986 and 1987 finals, and said that it had been clear to him that Johnson had the character and talent to win in the pressured environment of the World Championship. O'Sullivan said of Johnson: "He locked me into what the World Championship is about [...] After him I was hooked."

== Non-playing activities ==
Johnson was the subject of This is Your Life in late 1986, and he was a celebrity guest on the sports quiz A Question of Sport. In April 1987, BBC1 broadcast a 30-minute profile of Johnson, titled An Ordinary Joe, which focused on the year since his surprising World Championship victory. He made several appearances on the snooker-themed game show Big Break between 1991 and 2001. He was interviewed for an episode of the BBC Radio 5 Live show Time of My Life in 1998 and appeared on the TV quiz show Celebrity Eggheads in 2012.

He and his business partner Dave Shipley have bought three snooker clubs, and Johnson has managed snooker coaching academies. As well as coaching Shaun Murphy, he was an early influence on Paul Hunter. Johnson is a regular commentator for Eurosport. During the UK Championship in December 2013, he commented that John Higgins, who had been in poor form that season, was "searching for something that is not there" and "looking for someone or something to blame" for his own poor form. Higgins responded: "I heard before the tournament Joe Johnson was slating me. If that guy isn't the worst commentator in the world, he's in the top three."

Johnson sang in the Preston-based music band Made in Japan, who released a cover of "Everlasting Love" in October 1986. He is married to Terryll, and they have seven children. By 2017, Johnson had survived seven heart attacks.

== Performance and rankings timeline ==
Joe Johnson's world ranking positions
Season	1979/ 80	1980/ 81	1981/ 82	1982/ 83	1983/ 84	1984/ 85	1985/ 86	1986/ 87	1987/ 88	1988/ 89	1989/ 90	1990/ 91	1991/ 92	1992/ 93	1993/ 94	1994/ 95	1995/ 96	1996/ 97	1997/ 98	1998/ 99	1999/ 00	2000/ 01	2001/ 02	2002/ 03	2003/ 04	Ref.
Ranking	– (Note: New professionals do not have a world ranking.)	–	–	–	23	19	16	8	5	11	11	17	26	23	26	37	56	47	52	55	59	61	73	90	96	

Joe Johnson's performances at professional ranking tournaments
Tournament	1979/ 80	1980/ 81	1981/ 82	1982/ 83	1983/ 84	1984/ 85	1985/ 86	1986/ 87	1987/ 88	1988/ 89	1989/ 90	1990/ 91	1991/ 92	1992/ 93	1993/ 94	1994/ 95	1995/ 96	1996/ 97	1997/ 98	1998/ 99	1999/ 00	2000/ 01	2001/ 02	2002/ 03	2003/ 04	Ref.
LG Cup (Note: The event was also called the Professional Players Tournament (1982–83 to 1983–84).)	Not Held			QF	F	2R	3R	1R	2R	2R	QF	1R	QF	2R	1R	2R	2R	1R	LQ	2R	LQ	LQ	LQ	LQ	WD	
British Open (Note: The event was also called the British Gold Cup (1979‍–‍80), the Yamaha Organs Trophy (1980‍–‍81), and the International Masters (1981‍–‍82 to 1983‍–‍84).)	Non-Ranking Event					1R	2R	3R	3R	QF	2R	2R	3R	2R	2R	LQ	1R	LQ	2R	1R	1R	LQ	LQ	LQ	WD	
UK Championship	Non-Ranking Event					2R	2R	2R	SF	3R	3R	3R	1R	2R	1R	1R	LQ	3R	LQ	LQ	1R	LQ	LQ	LQ	WD	
Welsh Open	Not Held												3R	1R	1R	2R	LQ	1R	LQ	2R	1R	LQ	LQ	LQ	WD	
European Open (Note: The event also ran under the name Irish Open (1998‍–‍99).)	Not Held									3R	3R	2R	2R	3R	LQ	LQ	2R	LQ	NH	LQ	Not Held		LQ	LQ	WD	
Canadian Masters (Note: The event was also called the Canadian Open (1978‍–‍79 to 1980‍–‍81).)	NR		Not Held				Non-Ranking			1R	Not Held															
Hong Kong Open (Note: The event was also called the Australian Open (1994‍–‍95).)	Non-Ranking Event									NH	LQ	Not Held				NR	NR	Not Held								
Classic	Non-Ranking Event				1R	SF	QF	2R	2R	3R	1R	3R	1R	Not Held												
Strachan Open	Not Held												2R	Not Held												
Dubai Classic (Note: The event was also called the Dubai Masters (1988‍–‍89), the Dubai Classic (1989‍–‍90 to 1994‍–‍95), and the Thailand Classic (1995‍–‍96).)	Not Held									NR	1R	1R	QF	1R	LQ	LQ	LQ	LQ	LQ	Not Held						
German Open	Not Held																LQ	LQ	LQ	NR	Not Held					
Malta Grand Prix	Not Held															Non-Ranking Event					WD	NR	Not Held			
China Open (Note: The event also ran under the name China International (1997–98 and 1998–99).)	Not Held																		NR	LQ	LQ	LQ	LQ	Not Held		
Thailand Masters (Note: The event was also called the Thailand Masters (1983‍–‍84 to 1986‍–‍87, and 1991‍–‍92) and the Asian Open (1989‍–‍90 to 1992‍–‍93).)	Not Held				Non-Ranking Event				Not Held		2R	1R	1R	3R	LQ	LQ	LQ	LQ	LQ	LQ	LQ	LQ	LQ	NR	NH	
Irish Masters	Non-Ranking Event																							LQ	WD	
Players Championship (Note: The event was also called the Goya Matchroom Trophy (1985‍–‍86).)	Not Held		NR	LQ	1R	2R	QF	2R	1R	QF	1R	Not Held		1R	1R	LQ	2R	2R	LQ	1R	LQ	LQ	LQ	LQ	LQ	
World Championship	LQ	LQ	LQ	LQ	1R	1R	W	F	2R	1R	1R	1R	LQ	LQ	LQ	LQ	LQ	LQ	LQ	LQ	LQ	LQ	LQ	LQ	LQ	

Joe Johnson's performances at professional non-ranking tournaments
Tournament	1979/ 80	1980/ 81	1981/ 82	1982/ 83	1983/ 84	1984/ 85	1985/ 86	1986/ 87	1987/ 88	1988/ 89	1989/ 90	1990/ 91	1991/ 92	1992/ 93	1993/ 94	1994/ 95	1995/ 96	1996/ 97	1997/ 98	1998/ 99	1999/ 00	2000/ 01	2001/ 02	2002/ 03	2003/ 04	Ref.
The Masters	A	A	A	1R	A	A	1R	QF	SF	1R	QF	LQ	A	A	LQ	A	A	A	A	A	A	A	A	A	A	
Matchroom League (Note: The event was later called the Premier League.)	Not Held							A	RR (Note: Johnson finished tenth out of ten competitors.)	A	A	A	A	Not Held												
Players Championship	Not Held		2R	Ranking Event								Not Held		Ranking Event												
British Open	LQ	LQ	RR	LQ	LQ	Ranking Event																				
Bass & Golden Leisure Classic	Not Held		LQ	Not Held																						
UK Championship	1R	1R	2R	1R	QF	Ranking Event																				
Costa Del Sol Classic	Not Held					SF	Not Held																			
Australian Masters	A	A	A	A	A	A	QF	SF	QF	NH	R	Not Held				A	A	Not Held								
Scottish Masters	Not Held		A	A	A	A	A	QF	W	NH	A	A	A	A	A	A	A	A	A	A	A	A	A	Not Held		
Carling Challenge (Note: The event was also called the Carlsberg Challenge (1984‍–‍85 to 1986‍–‍87).)	Not Held					A	A	SF	F	A	Not Held															
Canadian Masters	2R	A	Not Held				A	QF	QF	R	Not Held															
Kent Cup	Not Held							A	QF	A	A	A	NH	A	Not Held											
World Matchplay	Not Held									QF	A	A	A	A	Not Held											
English Professional Championship	NH	QF	Not Held			2R	QF	SF	SF	QF	Not Held															
New Zealand Masters	Not Held					A	Not Held			SF	F	Not Held														
Irish Masters	A	A	A	A	A	A	A	QF	QF	A	1R	A	A	A	A	A	A	A	A	A	A	A	A	Ranking		
Shoot-Out	Not Held											1R	Not Held													
Nescafé Extra Challenge	Not Held											W	NH	A	Not Held											
Norwich Union Grand Prix	Not Held									A	W	SF	Not Held													
World Masters	Not Held											3R	Not Held													
Pontins Professional	A	A	A	A	A	A	A	A	A	A	QF	QF	A	A	A	A	A	A	A	A	A	Not Held				
European Challenge	Not Held												F	A	Not Held											
Strachan Challenge 1	Not Held													2R	LQ	Not Held										
Strachan Challenge 2	Not Held													LQ	LQ	Not Held										
Strachan Challenge 3	Not Held													LQ	Not Held											
Malta Grand Prix	Not Held															QF	A	A	A	A	R	A	Not Held			
Seniors Pot Black	Not Held																	W	Not Held							
World Seniors Masters	Not Held																				1R	Not Held				

Performance table legend
LQ	Lost in the qualifying draw	#R	Lost in the early rounds of the tournament (RR = Round-robin tournament)	QF	Lost in the quarter-finals
SF	Lost in the semi–finals	F	Lost in the final	W	Won the tournament
DNQ	Did not qualify for the tournament	A	Did not participate in the tournament	WD	Withdrew from the tournament

NH / Not Held	Means the event was not held.
NR / Non-Ranking Event	Means the event is/was no longer a ranking event.
R / Ranking Event	Means the event is/was a ranking event.

== Career finals ==
=== Ranking finals: 3 (1 title) ===
Ranking finals contested by Joe Johnson
Outcome	No.	Year	Championship	Opponent in the final	Score	Ref.
Runner-up	1.	1983	Professional Players Tournament	Tony Knowles (ENG)	8–9	
Winner	1.	1986	World Snooker Championship	Steve Davis (ENG)	18–12	
Runner-up	2.	1987	World Snooker Championship	Steve Davis (ENG)	14–18	

=== Non-ranking finals: 6 (3 titles) ===
Non-ranking finals contested by Joe Johnson
Outcome	No.	Year	Championship	Opponent in the final	Score	Ref.
Runner-up	1.	1987	Carling Challenge	Dennis Taylor (NIR)	5–8	
Winner	1.	1987	Scottish Masters	Terry Griffiths (WAL)	9–7	
Runner-up	2.	1989	New Zealand Masters	Willie Thorne (ENG)	4–7	
Winner	2.	1989	Norwich Union Grand Prix	Stephen Hendry (SCO)	5–3	
Winner	3.	1991	Nescafé Extra Challenge	James Wattana (THA)	Round–Robin	
Runner-up	3.	1992	European Challenge	Stephen Hendry (SCO)	0–4	

=== Pro-am finals: 1 (1 title) ===
Pro-am finals contested by Joe Johnson
Outcome	No.	Year	Championship	Opponent in the final	Score	Ref.
Winner	1.	1981	William Younger Open	Cliff Wilson (WAL)	8–7	

=== Amateur finals: 3 (1 title) ===
Amateur finals contested by Joe Johnson
Outcome	No.	Year	Championship	Opponent in the final	Score	Ref.
Winner	1.	1971	British Under-19 Championship	George Crimes (ENG)	3–0	
Runner-up	1.	1978	English Amateur Championship	Terry Griffiths (WAL)	6–13	
Runner-up	2.	1978	World Amateur Championship	Cliff Wilson (WAL)	5–11	

=== Seniors finals: 2 (2 titles) ===
Seniors finals contested by Joe Johnson
Outcome	No.	Year	Championship	Opponent in the final	Score	Ref.
Winner	1.	1997	Seniors Pot Black	Terry Griffiths (WAL)	2–0	
Winner	2.	2019	The Seniors Masters	Barry Pinches (ENG)	2–1	
