= 1989–90 snooker season =

Details
- Duration: July 1989 – May 1990
- Tournaments: 24 (10 ranking events)

Triple Crown winners
- UK Championship: (Scotland) Stephen Hendry
- Masters: (Scotland) Stephen Hendry
- World Championship: (Scotland) Stephen Hendry

The 1989–90 snooker season was a series of snooker tournaments played between July 1989 and May 1990. The following table outlines the results for ranking and the invitational events.

== New professional players ==
James Wattana, Barry Pinches, Duncan Campbell, Stephen Murphy, Andrew Cairns, Nick Dyson, Brian Morgan, Brady Gollan, Nigel Bond and Ian Brumby became professionals. All had earnt the right to play off against the lowest-10 ranked existing professionals, through the pro-ticket series. Three of the existing professionals (Greg Jenkins, Bernie Mikkelsen and Frank Jonik) opted instead for non-tournament status, which meant that Wattana, Pinches and Campbell did not need to play-off.

Play-off results
Player	Score	Player
Nick Dyson (ENG)	9–2	Dave Chalmers (ENG)
Brian Morgan (ENG)	9–0	Pascal Burke (IRL)
Nigel Bond (ENG)	9–0	Ian Black (SCO)
Stephen Murphy (IRL)	9–4	Derek Mienie (SAF)
Ian Brumbey (ENG)	9–3	Billy Kelly (IRL)
Brady Gollan (CAN)	9–2	Patsy Fagan (IRL)
Andrew Cairns (ENG)	9–4	Ian Anderson (AUS)

== Calendar ==
Date (Note: Dates use the mm-dd date format.)			Rank	Tournament name	Venue	City	Winner	Runner-up	Score	Reference
08–03	08–06	NZL	NR	New Zealand Masters	New Zealand Parliament	Wellington	(England) Willie Thorne	(England) Joe Johnson	7–4	
08–07	08–13	HKG	WR	Hong Kong Open	International Convention Centre	Hong Kong	(England) Mike Hallett	(New Zealand) Dene O'Kane	9–8	
08–17	08–27	THA	WR	Asian Open	Channel 12 Studios	Bangkok	(Scotland) Stephen Hendry	(Thailand) James Wattana	9–6	
09-02	09-03	HKG	NR	Hong Kong Gold Cup	Queen Elizabeth Stadium	Hong Kong	(England) Steve Davis	(Northern Ireland) Alex Higgins	6–3	
09–13	09–17	SCO	NR	Scottish Masters	Scottish Exhibition Centre	Glasgow	(Scotland) Stephen Hendry	(Wales) Terry Griffiths	10–1	
09–19	09–30	ENG	WR	International Open	Trentham Gardens	Stoke-on-Trent	(England) Steve Davis	(Scotland) Stephen Hendry	9–4	
10–09	10–22	ENG	WR	Grand Prix	Hexagon Theatre	Reading	(England) Steve Davis	(England) Dean Reynolds	10–0	
10–27	11–03	UAE	WR	Dubai Classic	Al Nasr Stadium	Dubai	(Scotland) Stephen Hendry	(Wales) Doug Mountjoy	9–2	
05–20	11–12	EUR	NR	Norwich Union Grand Prix	Monte Carlo	Monte Carlo	(England) Joe Johnson	(Scotland) Stephen Hendry	5–3	
11–17	12–03	ENG	WR	UK Championship	Guild Hall	Preston	(Scotland) Stephen Hendry	(England) Steve Davis	16–12	
12–07	12–16	ENG	NR	World Matchplay	Brentwood Centre	Brentwood	(England) Jimmy White	(England) John Parrott	18–9	
01–02	01–13	ENG	WR	The Classic	Norbreck Castle Hotel	Blackpool	(England) Steve James	(Australia) Warren King	10–6	
02–04	02–11	ENG	NR	The Masters	Wembley Conference Centre	London	(Scotland) Stephen Hendry	(England) John Parrott	9–4	
02–12	02–17	WAL	NR	Welsh Professional Championship	Newport Centre	Newport	(Wales) Darren Morgan	(Wales) Doug Mountjoy	9–7	
02–18	03–04	ENG	WR	British Open	Assembly Rooms	Derby	(Canada) Bob Chaperon	(Northern Ireland) Alex Higgins	10–8	
03–10	03–16	FRA	WR	European Open	Palais des Sports	Lyon	(England) John Parrott	(Scotland) Stephen Hendry	10–6	
03–15	03–18	CHN	NR	Kent Cup	Yuetan Gymnasium	Beijing	(Scotland) Marcus Campbell	(Canada) Tom Finstad	4–1	
03–21	03–24	ENG	TE	World Cup	Bournemouth International Centre	Bournemouth	Canada	Northern Ireland	9–5	
03–27	04–01	IRL	NR	Irish Masters	Goff's	Kill	(England) Steve Davis	(Northern Ireland) Dennis Taylor	9–4	
04–13	04–29	ENG	WR	World Snooker Championship	Crucible Theatre	Sheffield	(Scotland) Stephen Hendry	(England) Jimmy White	18–12	
05-07	05–09	WAL	NR	Pontins Professional	Pontins	Prestatyn	(Scotland) Stephen Hendry	(England) Mike Hallett	9–6	
10-10	05–15	ENG	NR	London Masters	Café Royal	London	(Scotland) Stephen Hendry	(England) John Parrott	4–2	
01–25	05–20	ENG	NR	Matchroom League			(England) Steve Davis	(Scotland) Stephen Hendry	(Note: No play-off was held and the title was decided on league table only.)	
01-16	06-17	EUR	NR	International League			(England) Tony Meo	(England) Jimmy White		

WR = World ranking event
NR = Non-ranking event

== Official rankings ==
The top 16 of the world rankings, these players automatically played in the final rounds of the world ranking events and were invited for the Masters.

No.	Ch.	Name
1	Steady	(England) Steve Davis
2	▲	(England) John Parrott
3	▲	(Scotland) Stephen Hendry
4	▼	(England) Jimmy White
5	Steady	(Wales) Terry Griffiths
6	▲	(England) Mike Hallett
7	▼	(Canada) Cliff Thorburn
8	▲	(Northern Ireland) Dennis Taylor
9	▲	(England) Willie Thorne
10	▲	(Wales) Doug Mountjoy
11	Steady	(England) Joe Johnson
12	▼	(England) Tony Knowles
13	▲	(England) John Virgo
14	▲	(England) Tony Meo
15	▲	(England) Dean Reynolds
16	▲	(England) Steve James
