= Marcel Gauvreau =

Canadian snooker player (born 1955)

Personal information
- Born: 9 January 1955 (age 71) Calgary, Alberta

Sport
- Country: Canada
- Sport: Snooker
- Professional: 1983–1993
- Highest ranking: 38 (1986–1987)
- Best ranking finish: Last 16 (x3)

Marcel Gauvreau (born 9 January 1955) is a Canadian former professional snooker player.

== Career ==
Gauvreau was born in 1955, and turned professional in 1983. He reached the last 32 at the World Championship at his first attempt in 1984, losing 5–10 to David Taylor, and the last 16 of the International Open the following season, where he was defeated 3–5 by Willie Thorne.

In the 1986 Classic, Gauvreau lost 2–5 in the last 16 to Jimmy White, and the next season, another run to this stage followed, this time at the 1986 International Open; here, he was beaten 2–5 by Peter Francisco.

In qualifying for the 1990 World Championship, Gauvreau trailed Jackie Rea 1–5, but recovered to 9–9; requiring several snookers in the deciding frame, he achieved them, going on to win the match 10–9. Rea retired from professional snooker after his defeat, and Gauvreau was eliminated in the next qualifying round, 5–10 by Gary Wilkinson.

Already outside the top 64 by the time of his defeat to Wilkinson, Gauvreau slipped further down the rankings in the next three years, and in 1993, ranked 86th, he lost his professional status.
