= 1990 London Masters =

London Masters
Tournament information
- Dates: 10 October 1989 – 15 May 1990
- Venue: Café Royal
- City: London
- Country: England
- Organisation: WPBSA
- Format: Non-ranking event
- Total prize fund: £75,000
- Winner's share: £30,000
- Highest break: John Parrott (ENG) (130)

Final
- Champion: (Scotland) Stephen Hendry
- Runner-up: (England) John Parrott
- Score: 4–2

The 1990 Continental Airlines London Masters was a professional invitational snooker tournament which took place from 10 October 1989 to 15 May 1990 at the Café Royal in London, England.

Stephen Hendry won the tournament beating John Parrott 4–2 in the final for the second consecutive year.

== Prize fund ==
The breakdown of prize money for this year is shown below:

- Winner: £30,000
- Runner-up: £12,500
- Semi-final: £7,500
- Quarter-final: £3,500
- Highest break: £3,500
- Total: £75,000

== Main draw ==
Best of 7 frames

Quarter-finals
(Scotland) Stephen Hendry	4
(Northern Ireland) Dennis Taylor	1
(England) Tony Meo	4
(England) Jimmy White	2
(England) John Parrott	4
(England) Mike Hallett	1
(England) Willie Thorne	4
(England) Steve Davis	3

Semi-finals
(Scotland) Stephen Hendry	4
(England) Tony Meo	1
(England) John Parrott	4
(England) Willie Thorne	2

Final
(Scotland) Stephen Hendry	4
(England) John Parrott	2
