= London Masters (snooker) =

Snooker tournament held 1989–1991

Tournament information
- Venue: Café Royal
- Location: London
- Country: England
- Established: 1989
- Organisation(s): WPBSA
- Format: Non-ranking event
- Final year: 1991
- Final champion: (England) Steve Davis

The London Masters was a non-ranking snooker tournament staged between 1989 and 1991. All three editions were held at the Café Royal in London and sponsored by Continental Airlines. Stephen Hendry won both of the first two editions of the event, defeating John Parrott twice in the final by the same score of 4–2. The final event, held in 1991 was won by Steve Davis who defeated Hendry in a whitewash 4–0.

== Prize money ==
The inaugural event in 1989 grand prize was £35,000, before increasing to £40,000 for the following two seasons. There was no prize for the highest break of the tournament.

== Winners ==
Year	Winner	Runner-up	Final score	Season
1989	(Scotland) Stephen Hendry	(England) John Parrott	4–2	1988/89
1990	(Scotland) Stephen Hendry	(England) John Parrott	4–2	1989/90
1991	(England) Steve Davis	(Scotland) Stephen Hendry	4–0	1990/91
