= 1991 London Masters =

London Masters
Tournament information
- Dates: October 1990–May 1991
- Venue: Café Royal
- City: London
- Country: England
- Organisation: WPBSA
- Format: Non-ranking event
- Winner's share: £40,000

Final
- Champion: (England) Steve Davis
- Runner-up: (Scotland) Stephen Hendry
- Score: 4–0

The 1991 Continental Airlines London Masters was a professional invitational snooker tournament, which took place from October 1990 to May 1991 at the Café Royal in London, England.

Steve Davis won the final edition of the tournament beating Stephen Hendry 4–0 in the final.

== Main draw ==
Best of 7 frames

Quarter-finals
1	(Scotland) Stephen Hendry	4
(England) Martin Clark	1
4	(England) Jimmy White	4
(England) Allison Fisher	2
3	(England) John Parrott	4
(Thailand) James Wattana	1
2	(England) Steve Davis	4
(England) Gary Wilkinson	0

Semi-finals
1	(Scotland) Stephen Hendry	4
4	(England) Jimmy White	2
3	(England) John Parrott	3
2	(England) Steve Davis	4

Final
1	(Scotland) Stephen Hendry	0
2	(England) Steve Davis	4
