= 1989 London Masters =

London Masters
Tournament information
- Dates: 22 September 1988 – 23 May 1989
- Venue: Café Royal
- City: London
- Country: England
- Organisation: WPBSA
- Format: Non-ranking event
- Total prize fund: £60,000
- Winner's share: £25,000
- Highest break: Stephen Hendry (SCO) (89)

Final
- Champion: (Scotland) Stephen Hendry
- Runner-up: (England) John Parrott
- Score: 4–2

The 1989 Continental Airlines London Masters was a professional invitational snooker tournament, which took place from 22 September 1988 to 23 May 1989 at the Café Royal in London, England.

Stephen Hendry won the tournament beating John Parrott 4–2 in the final.

== Prize fund ==
The breakdown of prize money for this year is shown below:

- Winner: £25,000
- Runner-up: £10,000
- Semi-final: £6,000
- Quarter-final: £2,500
- Highest break: £3,000
- Total: £60,000

== Main draw ==
Best of 7 frames

Quarter-finals
(Scotland) Stephen Hendry | 4
(Wales) Terry Griffiths | 0
(England) Steve Davis | 4
(England) Neal Foulds | 0
(England) John Parrott | 4
(Northern Ireland) Dennis Taylor | 2
(England) Jimmy White | 4
(Malta) Tony Drago | 1

Semi-finals
(Scotland) Stephen Hendry | 4
(England) Steve Davis | 1
(England) John Parrott | 4
(England) Jimmy White | 0

Final
(Scotland) Stephen Hendry | 4
(England) John Parrott | 2
