= 1994 European League =

Lowen Sport European League
Tournament information
- Dates: 1 January – 29 May 1994
- Country: Germany
- Organisation: Matchroom Sport
- Format: Non-ranking event
- Winner's share: £30,000

Final
- Champion: (Scotland) Stephen Hendry
- Runner-up: (England) John Parrott
- Score: 10–7

The 1994 Lowen Sport European League was a professional non-ranking snooker tournament that was played from 1 January to 29 May 1994.

Stephen Hendry won in the final 10–7 against John Parrott.

== League phase ==
Ranking		(England) PAR	(Scotland) MCM	(Scotland) HEN	(England) WHI	(England) DAV	(England) OSU	(England) FIS	(Netherlands) WEH	(Austria) BUR	(Germany) DIE	Frame W-L	Match W-D-L	Pld-Pts
1	John Parrott	x	3	5	6	5	6	7	6	5	7	50–22	8–0–1	9–8
2	Alan McManus	5	x	4	6	5	5	4	7	7	7	50–22	7–2–0	9–7
3	Stephen Hendry	3	4	x	3	7	7	6	8	7	7	52–20	6–1–2	9–6
4	Jimmy White	2	2	5	x	5	2	4	5	6	5	36–36	5–1–3	9–5
5	Steve Davis	3	3	1	3	x	5	7	5	7	7	41–31	5–0–4	9–5
6	Ronnie O'Sullivan	2	3	1	6	3	x	5	4	6	6	36–36	4–1–4	9–4
7	Allison Fisher	1	4	2	4	1	3	x	5	4	6	30–42	2–3–4	9–2
8	Mario Wehrmann	2	1	0	3	3	4	3	x	7	2	25–47	1–1–7	9–1
9	Robert Burda	3	1	1	2	1	2	4	1	x	7	22–50	1–1–7	9–1
10	Sascha Diemer	1	1	1	3	1	2	2	6	1	x	18–54	1–0–8	9–1

Top four qualified for the play-offs. If points were level then most frames won determined their positions. If two players had an identical record then the result in their match determined their positions. If that ended 4–4 then the player who got to four first was higher.

- John Parrott 5–3 Steve Davis
- Ronnie O'Sullivan 6–2 Jimmy White
- John Parrott 6–2 Ronnie O'Sullivan
- Jimmy White 5–3 Stephen Hendry
- Alan McManus 5–3 Ronnie O'Sullivan
- Stephen Hendry 7–1 Steve Davis
- Alan McManus 6–2 Jimmy White
- Steve Davis 7–1 Sascha Diemer
- John Parrott 5–3 Stephen Hendry
- Sascha Diemer 6–2 Mario Wehrmann
- John Parrott 7–1 Allison Fisher
- Alan McManus 7–1 Robert Burda
- Jimmy White 5–3 Steve Davis
- John Parrott 6–2 Jimmy White
- Alan McManus 4–4 Stephen Hendry
- John Parrott 6–2 Mario Wehrmann
- Ronnie O'Sullivan 6–2 Robert Burda
- Allison Fisher 6–2 Sascha Diemer
- Stephen Hendry 8–0 Mario Wehrmann
- Alan McManus 5–3 John Parrott
- Steve Davis 7–1 Allison Fisher
- Ronnie O'Sullivan 6–2 Sascha Diemer
- Mario Wehrmann 7–1 Robert Burda
- Stephen Hendry 6–2 Allison Fisher
- Steve Davis 5–3 Ronnie O'Sullivan
- Robert Burda 4–4 Allison Fisher
- Alan McManus 7–1 Sascha Diemer
- Jimmy White 6–2 Robert Burda
- Ronnie O'Sullivan 4–4 Mario Wehrmann
- Robert Burda 7–1 Sascha Diemer
- Alan McManus 5–3 Steve Davis
- Allison Fisher 4–4 Jimmy White
- Stephen Hendry 7–1 Sascha Diemer
- Allison Fisher 5–3 Mario Wehrmann
- Stephen Hendry 7–1 Robert Burda
- John Parrott 7–1 Sascha Diemer
- Alan McManus 7–1 Mario Wehrmann
- Ronnie O'Sullivan 5–3 Allison Fisher
- Alan McManus 4–4 Allison Fisher
- Stephen Hendry 7–1 Ronnie O'Sullivan
- John Parrott 5–3 Robert Burda
- Jimmy White 5–3 Mario Wehrmann
- Steve Davis 7–1 Robert Burda
- Jimmy White 5–3 Sascha Diemer
- Steve Davis 5–3 Mario Wehrmann

== Play-offs ==
28–29 May (Atlantis Hotel, Bingen am Rhein, Germany)

Semi-finals; Best of 11 frames
1	(England) John Parrott	6
4	(England) Jimmy White	1
2	(Scotland) Alan McManus	3
3	(Scotland) Stephen Hendry	6

Final; Best of 19 frames
1	(England) John Parrott	7
3	(Scotland) Stephen Hendry	10
