= 1993 European Challenge =

Tournament information
- Dates: 15–16 January 1993
- City: Epernay
- Country: France
- Organisation: WPBSA
- Format: Non-ranking event
- Total prize fund: £52,000
- Winner's share: £20,000

Final
- Champion: (Scotland) Stephen Hendry
- Runner-up: (Malta) Tony Drago
- Score: 5–3

The 1993 Canal Plus European Challenge was a professional non-ranking snooker tournament held by the WPBSA, which took place between 15 and 16 January 1993 in Epernay, France.

Stephen Hendry won the tournament, beating Tony Drago 5–3 in the final.

== Main draw ==
Quarter-finals; Best of 7 frames
(Malta) Tony Drago	4
(England) Jimmy White	2
(Scotland) Alan McManus	4
(England) Peter Ebdon	3
(Northern Ireland) Dennis Taylor	4
(England) Willie Thorne	1
(Scotland) Stephen Hendry	4
(France) Luc Allain	1

Semi-finals; Best of 7 frames
(Malta) Tony Drago	4
(Scotland) Alan McManus	1
(Northern Ireland) Dennis Taylor	0
(Scotland) Stephen Hendry	4

Final; Best of 9 frames
(Malta) Tony Drago	3
(Scotland) Stephen Hendry	5
