= 1992 European Challenge =

European Challenge
Tournament information
- Dates: March 1992
- Venue: Happy European Sports & Business Centre
- City: Waregem
- Country: Belgium
- Organisation: WPBSA
- Format: Non-ranking event
- Winner's share: £20,000

Final
- Champion: (Scotland) Stephen Hendry
- Runner-up: (England) Joe Johnson
- Score: 4–0

The 1992 Canal Plus European Challenge was a professional invitational snooker tournament, which took place in March 1992 at the Happy European Sports & Business Centre in Waregem, Belgium.

Stephen Hendry won the tournament beating Joe Johnson 4–0 in the final.

== Main draw ==
Quarter-finals; Best of 5 frames
(Scotland) Stephen Hendry	3
(Canada) Alain Robidoux	1
(England) Gary Wilkinson	3
(Northern Ireland) Dennis Taylor	0
(England) Joe Johnson	3
(England) Jimmy White	2
(England) Mike Hallett	3
(England) Neal Foulds	1

Semi-finals; Best of 5 frames
(Scotland) Stephen Hendry	3
(England) Gary Wilkinson	0
(England) Joe Johnson	3
(England) Mike Hallett	0

Final; Best of 7 frames
(Scotland) Stephen Hendry	4
(England) Joe Johnson	0
