= 2012 World Snooker Championship =

Professional snooker tournament

2012 Betfred.com World Snooker Championship

Tournament information
- Dates: 21 April – 7 May 2012
- Venue: Crucible Theatre
- City: Sheffield
- Country: England
- Organisation: World Snooker
- Format: Ranking event
- Total prize fund: £1,152,500
- Winner's share: £250,000
- Highest break: Stephen Hendry (SCO) (147)

Final
- Champion: Ronnie O'Sullivan (ENG)
- Runner-up: Ali Carter (ENG)
- Score: 18–11

The 2012 World Snooker Championship (officially the 2012 Betfred.com World Snooker Championship) was a professional snooker tournament that took place from 21 April to 7 May 2012 at the Crucible Theatre in Sheffield, England. It was the 36th consecutive year that the World Snooker Championship had been held at the Crucible and the last ranking event of the 2011–12 snooker season. The event was broadcast in the United Kingdom by the BBC, and in Europe by Eurosport.

Ronnie O'Sullivan won his fourth world title by defeating Ali Carter 18–11 in the final. Aged 36, O'Sullivan became the oldest world champion since 45-year-old Ray Reardon in 1978. John Higgins, the defending champion, lost 4–13 to Stephen Hendry in the second round. Hendry made the highest break during the tournament, a maximum break of 147. Hendry, seven-time winner of the event, announced his retirement from professional snooker following his defeat by Stephen Maguire in the quarter-finals.

== Overview ==
The World Snooker Championship is an annual cue sport tournament and the official world championship of the game of snooker. Invented in the late 19th century by British Army soldiers stationed in India, the sport was popular in Great Britain. In modern times it has been played worldwide, especially in East and Southeast Asian nations such as China, Hong Kong and Thailand.

In the 2012 tournament, 32 professional players competed in one-on-one snooker matches played over several frames, using a single-elimination tournament format. The 32 players were selected for the event using the snooker world rankings and a pre-tournament qualification competition. In 1927, the first world championship was won by Joe Davis. The event's final took place in Camkin's Hall, Birmingham, England. Since 1977, the event has been held at the Crucible Theatre in Sheffield, England. The event was organised by the World Professional Billiards and Snooker Association. Scotsman John Higgins was the defending champion, having defeated Judd Trump 18–15 in the previous year's final. The event was sponsored by sports betting company Betfred.

=== Format ===
The 2012 World Snooker Championship took place from 21 April to 7 May 2008 in Sheffield, England. The tournament was the last of nine ranking events in the 2011–12 snooker season on the World Snooker Tour. It featured a 32-player main draw that was held at the Crucible Theatre, as well as a qualifying draw that was played at the English Institute of Sport in Sheffield from 5 to 15 April. This was the 36th consecutive year that the tournament had been staged at the Crucible. The main stages of the event were broadcast by the BBC in the United Kingdom.

The top 16 players in the latest world rankings automatically qualified for the main draw as seeded players. (Note: In the event of the defending champion being ranked outside the top 16, he would replace the player ranked world number 16 as an automatic qualifier.) Higgins was seeded first overall as the defending champion, and the remaining 15 seeds were allocated based on the latest world rankings. The number of frames required to win a match increased throughout the tournament. The first round consisted of best-of-19-frames matches, with the final match being played over a maximum of 35 frames. All 16 non-seeded spots in the main draw were filled with players from the qualifying rounds.

=== Prize fund ===
The prize fund for the championship was divided as follows:

- Winner: £250,000
- Runner-up: £125,000
- Semi-final: £52,000
- Quarter-final: £24,050
- Last 16: £16,000
- Last 32: £12,000
- Last 48: £8,200
- Last 64: £4,600
- Stage one highest break: £1,000
- Stage two highest break: £10,000
- Stage one maximum break: £1,500
- Stage two maximum break: £40,000
- Total: £1,152,500

== Tournament summary ==
=== First round ===
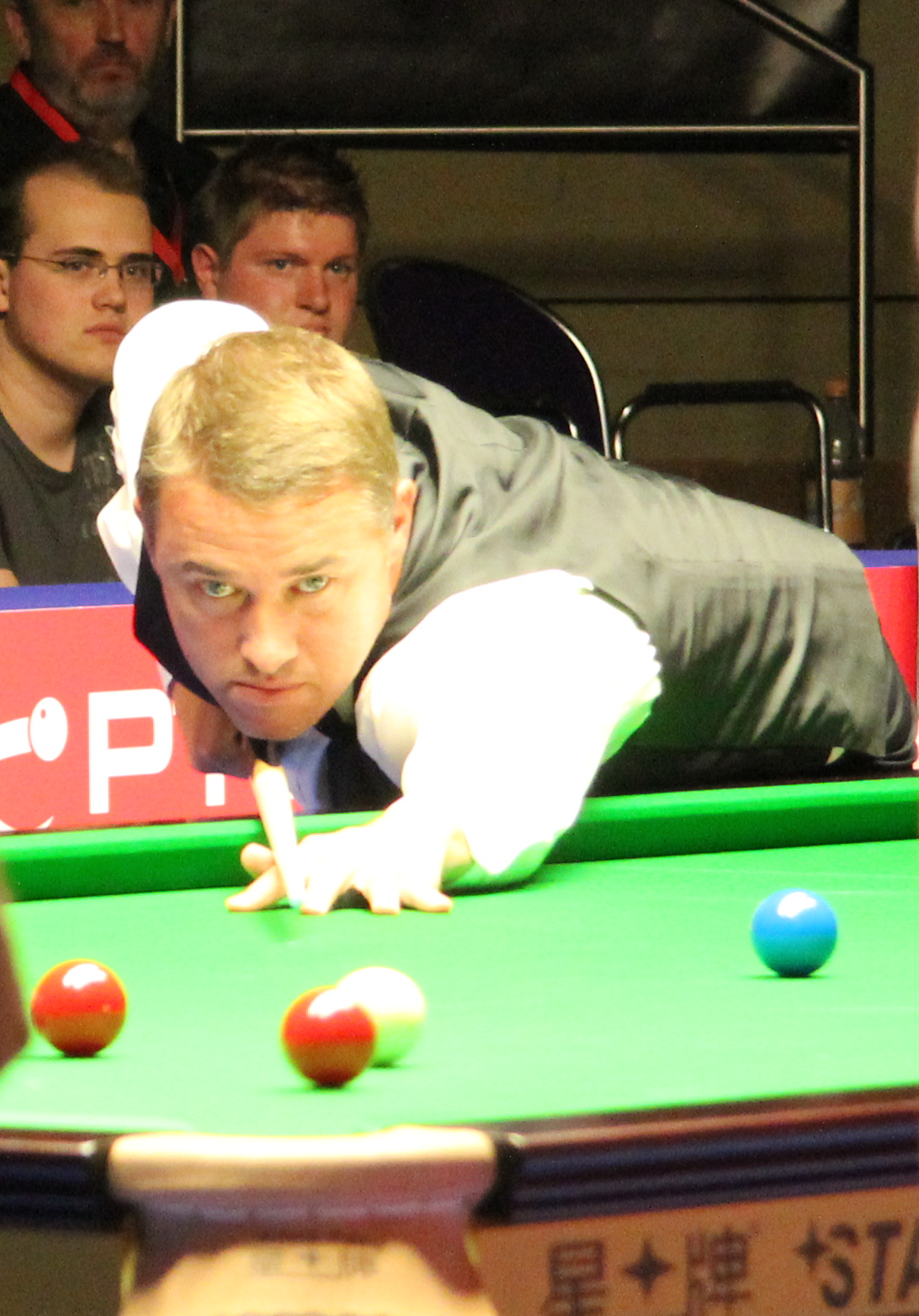
Stephen Hendry (pictured in 2011) compiled a maximum break in the opening round.

The first round was played from 21 to 26 April as the best of 19 frames held over two sessions. Three players were making their debut at the event: Jamie Jones, Cao Yupeng, and Luca Brecel. It was also the first time that both Cao and Brecel had qualified for the televised stage of a ranking event. Cao and Jones advanced to the second round by defeating Mark Allen 10–6 and Shaun Murphy 10–8 respectively, whilst Brecel lost 5–10 against Stephen Maguire. Brecel was the youngest player ever to compete at the Crucible, aged 17 years and 45 days old. He was also the first Belgian to play at the Crucible.

Mark Allen, following his first-round defeat by Cao, accused his opponent of cheating. Allen claimed that Cao had not admitted to a push shot at 5–4. However, he also conceded that the Chinese player had outplayed him during the match. World Snooker decided to start disciplinary action against Allen, who later admitted having gone too far. He was later fined a total of £11,000, and warned he would be suspended from the tour for three months if he breached the rules again in the next six months. Allen was also ordered to undergo media training.

In his match against Stuart Bingham, Stephen Hendry made the 10th maximum break to be made at the event. This was the 88th official maximum, and Hendry equalled two records held by Ronnie O'Sullivan: the most official maximum breaks in professional snooker (11) and the most at the venue (3). Hendry won the match 10–4 in a rematch of one of his greatest upset defeats, in the first round of the 2000 World Snooker Championship when Hendry was defending champion and Bingham was making his television debut. Zhu Ying became the first Chinese person to referee a match at the Crucible by officiating the match between Hendry and Bingham. Mark Williams stated on Twitter before the championship that he hated the Crucible and wished that the tournament was played in China. Williams was subsequently booed as he was announced to the crowd before his opening match, and was later fined a total of £4,000.

Ding Junhui and Ryan Day went to a deciding frame, which was won by Day. Ding said that the table conditions were not right and complained about spectators being disruptive during the match. He was later fined £250, and warned by the chairman of the Disciplinary Committee for swearing during the live press conference. In his match against Ken Doherty, Neil Robertson made three consecutive century breaks, as he completed a 10–4 victory. Andrew Higginson and David Gilbert reached the second round of the event for the first time in their respective careers. Higginson defeated Stephen Lee 10–6, and Gilbert defeated Martin Gould 10–8.

Half of the seeded players were beaten in the first round. Bingham, Graeme Dott, Murphy, Lee, Gould, Ding Junhui, Allen and Selby all lost their places in the tournament. This marked the most top 16 players to suffer defeat in the first round since 1992. There was the most Asian players in the history of the event, five.

=== Second round ===
The second round was played from 26 to 30 April, as the best of 25 frames held over three sessions. Multiple time winners Higgins and Hendry had made 45 appearances at the Crucible between them, having both had played in every tournament since 1995; but this was the only time they ever met at the Crucible. Higgins made the 500th century break of his career in his match against Hendry. Two frames later Hendry made his 775th. Hendry defeated Higgins 13–4 to reach his 19th quarter-final at the event. At that time only eight players had played at the Crucible at least that many times: Hendry, Steve Davis, Jimmy White, Terry Griffiths, John Parrott, Peter Ebdon, Willie Thorne and O'Sullivan. Ali Carter trailed Judd Trump 9–12, but won the next four frames to win 13–12. In the deciding frame Trump needed four snookers and got three, before Carter finally potted the last remaining red ball.

Crucible debutant Jones reached his first ranking event quarter-final by defeating Andrew Higginson 13–10. After the second session Jones led 10–6; before Higginson won the four opening frames of the last session to tie the score 10–10. Jones took the next three frames to win the match. He became the third Welshman into this year's quarter-finals, following Day and Matthew Stevens. Robertson led Gilbert 5–3 and 10–6 before winning 13–9. Day defeated Cao 13–7 to reach the quarter-finals for the third time. Eighth seed Maguire defeated Perry 13–7, whilst O'Sullivan defeated Williams 13–6, having won six frames in a row in the second session.

=== Quarter-finals ===
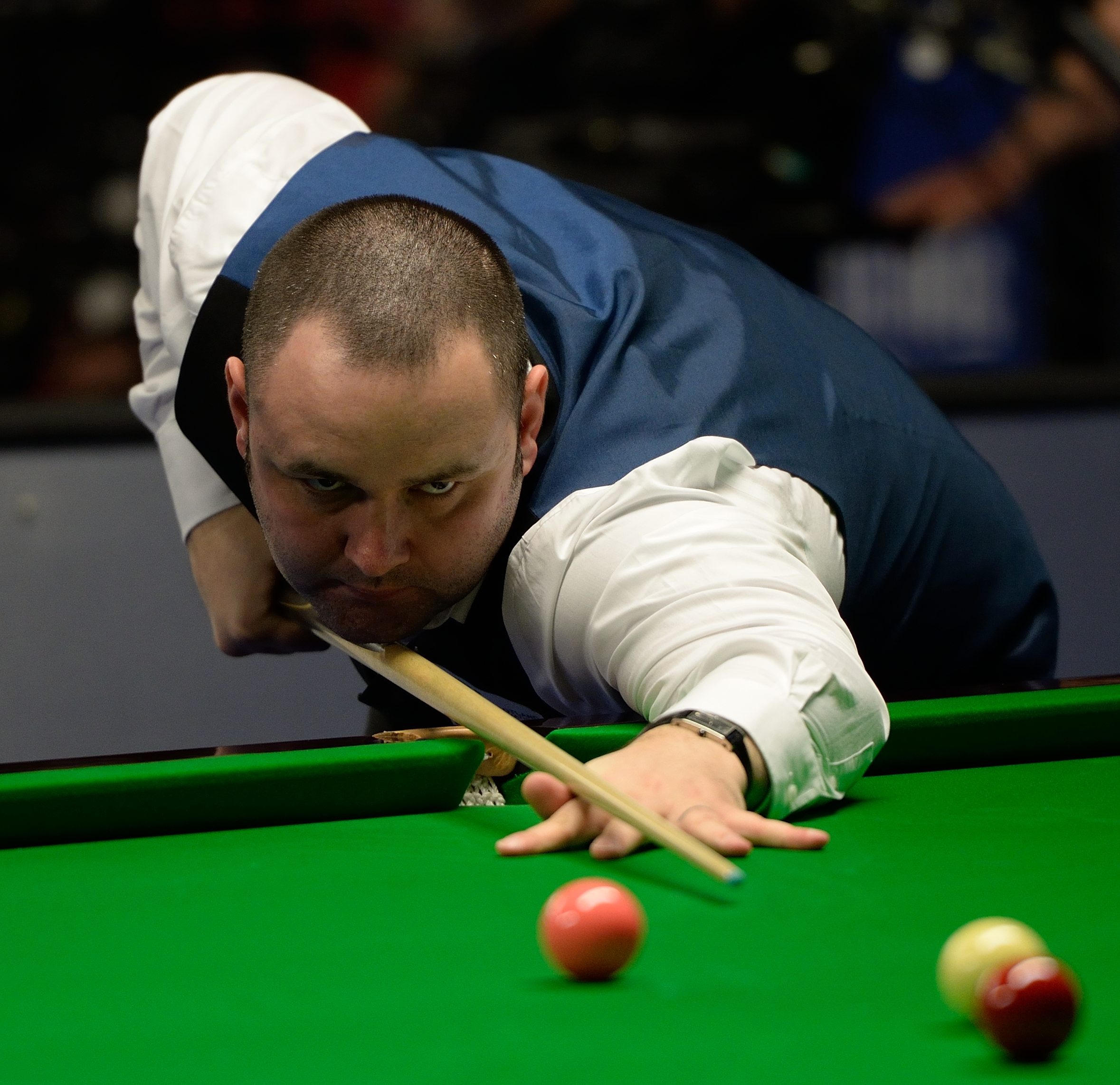
Stephen Maguire (pictured in 2015) defeated Stephen Hendry 13–2 to reach the semi-finals.

The quarter-finals were played on 1 and 2 May as the best of 25 frames, held over three sessions. Hendry was defeated by Maguire with a session to spare, 13–2. Hendry won only one of the eight frames in the opening session, with Maguire winning the first four frames of the second session. Hendry won frame 13, but Maguire won the next two frames to complete the victory. After the match Hendry announced his immediate retirement from professional snooker, citing dissatisfaction with his standard of play in recent years and difficulty balancing competitive, commercial and personal commitments. Hendry would be in retirement until 2020, when he announced he would play again on the Tour, playing his next professional event at the 2021 Gibraltar Open.

Stevens played Day, but trailed 2–5 in the first session. He won the final frame of that session, all eight frames of the second session, and won the match 13–5 after taking the first two frames of the third session. This was the first time he had reached the semi-finals since he played in the 2005 final. Carter led 2–1 before Jones tied the scores with a break of 127. However, Carter won three of the next four to lead 5–3 after the first session. Jones completed back-to-back centuries in the second session, but still trailed by two frames after the second session, with Carter winning the match 13–11. Robertson took a 5–3 lead over O'Sullivan after the first session of their match, but O'Sullivan won six straight frames to take a 9–7 lead after the second. O'Sullivan won the match 13–10, making a further two century breaks in the final session.

=== Semi-finals ===
The semi-finals were played as the best of 33 frames held over four sessions on 3, 4 and 5 May. Carter met Maguire, and led 5–3 after the first session. Maguire made a 142 break in frame 15, but still trailed after the second session by four frames. The pair shared the eight frames of the third session, with Carter leading 14–10. Carter then won three of the next five to win the match 17–12. Earlier in the season, Carter had considered retiring from the game, due to struggles with Crohn's disease. Hendry, acting as a pundit for BBC Sport, commented how Carter had "frustrated" Maguire during the match.

O'Sullivan met Stevens in the other semi-final. This was O'Sullivan's ninth world championship semi-final, and Steven's sixth. O'Sullivan led the match 5–3 after the opening session, but won six of the eight in the second to lead 11–5. The pair shared the eight frames of the third session, leaving O'Sullivan 15–9 ahead. Stevens took the first frame in the fourth session, before O'Sullivan made a break of 130 in frame 26, and won the next frame to complete a 17–10 victory. Snooker pundit John Parrott likened playing O'Sullivan to be as difficult as "hold[ing] a tiger by the tail".

=== Final ===
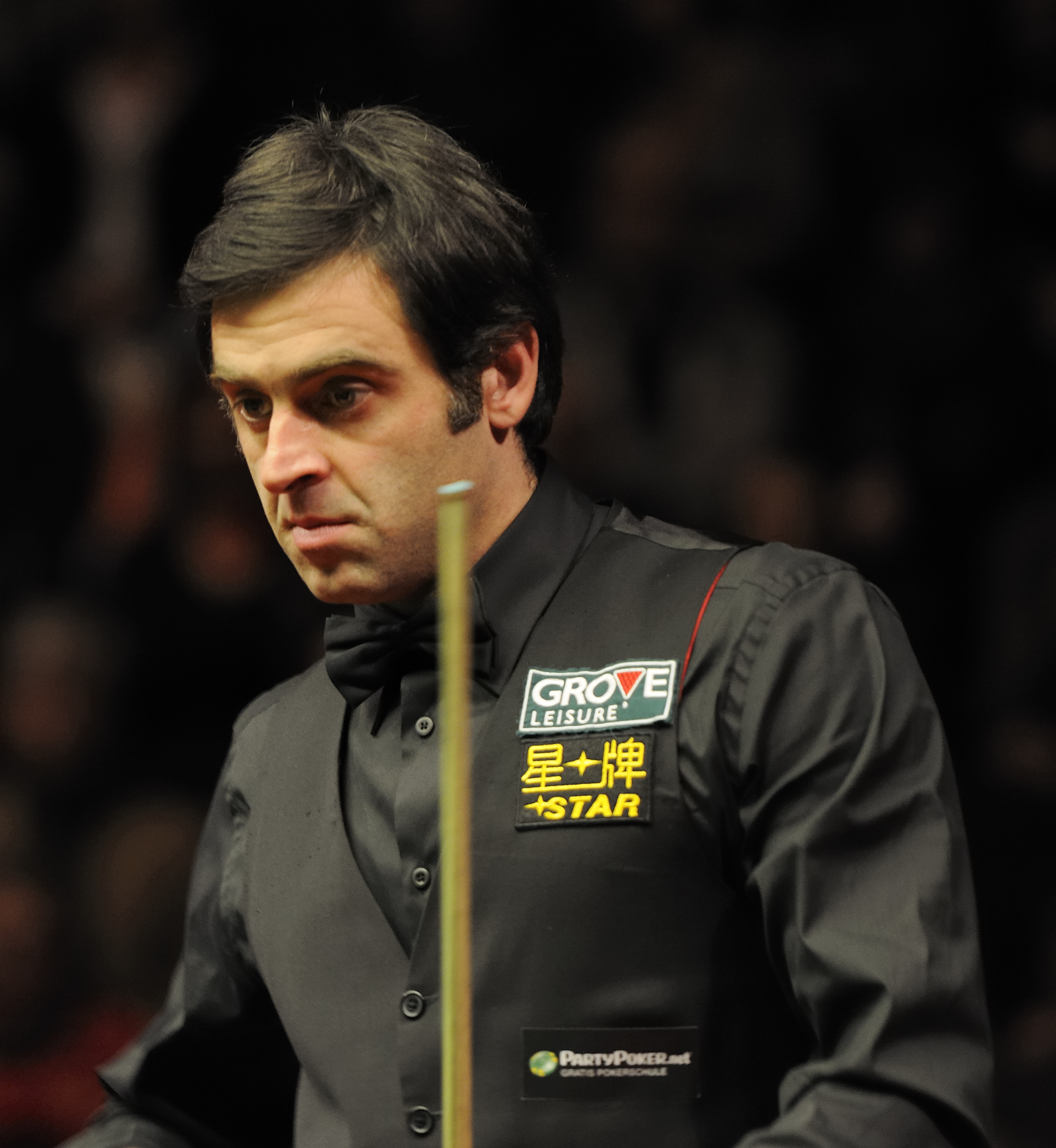
Ronnie O'Sullivan won the event, lifting the World Championship trophy for the fourth time.

The final was played on 6 and 7 May as the best of 35 frames held over four sessions between Carter and O'Sullivan. This was the second time that the pair had met in the final of the event, with O'Sullivan defeating Carter 18–8 in the 2008 final. This was O'Sullivan's fourth world championship final, having won the prior three, whilst Carter was featuring in his second. Carter had never beaten O'Sullivan in 11 previous attempts in ranking events before this match. O'Sullivan made two century breaks in the opening session, including a 141 break in the eighth frame, the highest in a world championship final to date. The previous record was 139 made by O'Sullivan in the 2001 final. The pair were tied at 3–3, but O'Sullivan won the final two frames of the session to lead 5–3. O'Sullivan won four of the next six to lead 9–5, and led 10–7 overnight. A break of 101 by O'Sullivan saw him lead 11–7 and he then won the next three frames to lead 14–7. Carter won the next three frames, including a century break, before O'Sullivan won the final frame of the session to lead 15–10. Only four frames were played in the final session, as O'Sullivan won three of them to complete a 18–11 victory.

This was O'Sullivan's fourth championship, and was the oldest person to win the event since Dennis Taylor in 1985. O'Sullivan praised the work of Steve Peters, his sports psychologist, for the victory, saying: "I wouldn't have been playing if it wasn't for Steve... I've stuck in there. I've had to face things that I didn't want to face." Carter would comment that his opponent was "the better man", but that he was disappointed to lose. This was the twelfth meeting between the pair in ranking competitions, with O'Sullivan winning all of them. Carter would eventually defeat O'Sullivan at the event in the second round of the 2018 World Snooker Championship. After the event, O'Sullivan announced he would take a six months sabbatical from the sport; however, he only played one competitive match before the following year's event, which he also won.

== Main draw ==
Shown below are the results for each round. The numbers in parentheses beside some of the players are their seeding ranks (each championship has 16 seeds and 16 qualifiers). The draw for the first round took place on 16 April 2012, one day after the qualifying, and was broadcast live by Talksport.

First round Best of 19 frames
21 April
John Higgins (SCO) (1)	10
Liang Wenbo (CHN)	9
21 & 22 April
Stuart Bingham (ENG) (16)	4
Stephen Hendry (SCO)	10
24 & 25 April
Graeme Dott (SCO) (9)	1
Joe Perry (ENG)	10
22 & 23 April
Stephen Maguire (SCO) (8)	10
Luca Brecel (BEL)	5
22 & 23 April
Shaun Murphy (ENG) (5)	8
Jamie Jones (WAL)	10
23 & 24 April
Stephen Lee (ENG) (12)	6
Andrew Higginson (ENG)	10
25 & 26 April
Ali Carter (ENG) (13)	10
Mark Davis (ENG)	2
24 & 25 April
Judd Trump (ENG) (4)	10
Dominic Dale (WAL)	7
25 & 26 April
Mark Williams (WAL) (3)	10
Liu Chuang (CHN)	6
23 & 24 April
Ronnie O'Sullivan (ENG) (14)	10
Peter Ebdon (ENG)	4
21 & 22 April
Martin Gould (ENG) (11)	8
David Gilbert (ENG)	10
21 & 22 April
Neil Robertson (AUS) (6)	10
Ken Doherty (IRL)	4
24 & 25 April
Ding Junhui (CHN) (7)	9
Ryan Day (WAL)	10
21 & 22 April
Mark Allen (NIR) (10)	6
Cao Yupeng (CHN)	10
23 April
Matthew Stevens (WAL) (15)	10
Marco Fu (HKG)	3
24 & 25 April
Mark Selby (ENG) (2)	3
Barry Hawkins (ENG)	10

Second round Best of 25 frames
27 & 28 April
(Scotland) John Higgins (1)	4
(Scotland) Stephen Hendry	13
26, 27 & 28 April
(England) Joe Perry	7
(Scotland) Stephen Maguire (8)	13
29 & 30 April
(Wales) Jamie Jones	13
(England) Andrew Higginson	10
28, 29 & 30 April
(England) Ali Carter (13)	13
(England) Judd Trump (4)	12
28, 29 & 30 April
(Wales) Mark Williams (3)	6
(England) Ronnie O'Sullivan (14)	13
26 & 27 April
(England) David Gilbert	9
(Australia) Neil Robertson (6)	13
27 & 28 April
(Wales) Ryan Day	13
(China) Cao Yupeng	7
29 & 30 April
(Wales) Matthew Stevens (15)	13
(England) Barry Hawkins	11

Quarter-finals; Best of 25 frames
1 May
(Scotland) Stephen Hendry	2
(Scotland) Stephen Maguire (8)	13
1 & 2 May
(Wales) Jamie Jones	11
(England) Ali Carter (13)	13
1 & 2 May
(England) Ronnie O'Sullivan (14)	13
(Australia) Neil Robertson (6)	10
1 & 2 May
(Wales) Ryan Day	5
(Wales) Matthew Stevens (15)	13

Semi-finals; Best of 33 frames
3, 4 & 5 May
(Scotland) Stephen Maguire (8)	12
(England) Ali Carter (13)	17
3, 4 & 5 May
(England) Ronnie O'Sullivan (14)	17
(Wales) Matthew Stevens (15)	10

Final; Best of 35 frames
6 & 7 May
(England) Ali Carter (13)	11
(England) Ronnie O'Sullivan (14)	18

Final (Best of 35 frames) Crucible Theatre, Sheffield, 6 & 7 May 2012. Referee: Michaela Tabb.
Ali Carter (13); England	11–18	Ronnie O'Sullivan (14); England
37–77, 1–121, 85–0, 58–24, 42–86, 55–2, 0–108, 0–141, 84–8, 21–73, 14–69, 62–30, 8–73, 13–60, 83–1, 34–74, 52–3, 0–101, 12–73, 48–62, 41–81, 59–9, 105–34, 62–5, 4–129, 0–92, 78–17, 0–76, 0–82	Match time: 9:08:04 (H:MM:SS); Average frame time: 18:54 (MM:SS) Century breaks: 4 (Carter 1, O'Sullivan 3); Highest break by Carter: 105; Highest break by O'Sullivan: 141	37–77, 1–121, 85–0, 58–24, 42–86, 55–2, 0–108, 0–141, 84–8, 21–73, 14–69, 62–30, 8–73, 13–60, 83–1, 34–74, 52–3, 0–101, 12–73, 48–62, 41–81, 59–9, 105–34, 62–5, 4–129, 0–92, 78–17, 0–76, 0–82
(England) Ronnie O'Sullivan wins the 2012 Betfred.com World Snooker Championship

== Qualification draw ==
=== Preliminary qualifying ===
The preliminary qualifying rounds for the tournament were for WPBSA members not on the Main Tour and took place on 5 April 2012 at the World Snooker Academy in Sheffield.

Round 1

(England) John Parrott	0–5	(Northern Ireland) Patrick Wallace
(Republic of Ireland) Joe Delaney	5–4	(England) Stephen Rowlings
(England) Philip Minchin	3–5	(England) Barry Stark
(England) Ali Bassiri	0–5	(India) David Singh
(England) Jamie O'Neill	5–4	(England) David Gray
(England) Les Dodd	0–5	(England) Justin Astley

Round 2

(Northern Ireland) Patrick Wallace	5–2	(Republic of Ireland) Joe Delaney
(England) Barry Stark	1–5	(India) David Singh
(England) Stephen Ormerod	0–5	(England) Jamie O'Neill
(England) Del Smith	2–5	(England) Justin Astley

=== Qualifying ===
The qualifying rounds 1–4 for the tournament that took place between 6 and 12 April 2012 at the English Institute of Sport in Sheffield. The final round of qualifying took place between 14 and 15 April 2012 at the same venue. Robert Milkins made the 87th official maximum break during his round four qualifying match against Xiao Guodong on 11 April 2012. This was the second maximum break of Milkins' career.

Round 1

(Brazil) Igor Figueiredo	10–5	(England) Jamie O'Neill

Rounds 2–5

Round 2 Best of 19 frames
(China) Tian Pengfei	5
(England) Adam Wicheard	10
(Northern Ireland) Joe Swail	5
(Wales) Daniel Wells	10
(England) Liam Highfield	10
(England) Matthew Couch	5
(Wales) Andrew Pagett	8
(India) Aditya Mehta	10
(China) Li Yan	10
(England) Paul Davison	4
(China) Yu Delu	10
(Northern Ireland) Patrick Wallace	9
(Norway) Kurt Maflin	2
(China) Cao Yupeng	10
(England) Andrew Norman	8
(Brazil) Igor Figueiredo	10
(England) Ian McCulloch	2
(Belgium) Luca Brecel	10
(England) Sam Craigie	9
(England) Justin Astley	10
(England) David Gilbert	10
(England) Stuart Carrington	7
(England) Rod Lawler	10
(Thailand) Dechawat Poomjaeng	8
(Republic of Ireland) David Morris	10
(Poland) Kacper Filipiak	2
(Thailand) Passakorn Suwannawat	10
(India) David Singh	5
(England) Sam Baird	8
(England) David Grace	10
(England) Adam Duffy	10
(India) Lucky Vatnani	2

Round 3 Best of 19 frames
(Scotland) Anthony McGill	10
(England) Adam Wicheard	0
(England) Ben Woollaston	10
(Wales) Daniel Wells	4
(England) Andy Hicks	10
(England) Liam Highfield	3
(China) Xiao Guodong	10
(India) Aditya Mehta	4
(Thailand) James Wattana	10
(China) Li Yan	6
(Wales) Michael White	2
(China) Yu Delu	10
(England) Dave Harold	9
(China) Cao Yupeng	10
(China) Liu Song	9
(Brazil) Igor Figueiredo	10
(England) Barry Pinches	3
(Belgium) Luca Brecel	10
(Malta) Tony Drago	7
(England) Justin Astley	10
(England) Jimmy Robertson	9
(England) David Gilbert	10
(China) Liu Chuang	10
(England) Rod Lawler	7
(England) Mark Joyce	4
(Republic of Ireland) David Morris	10
(England) Peter Lines	10
(Thailand) Passakorn Suwannawat	4
(England) Alfie Burden	10
(England) David Grace	5
(England) Adrian Gunnell	8
(England) Adam Duffy	10

Round 4 Best of 19 frames
(England) Anthony Hamilton	10
(Scotland) Anthony McGill	8
(England) Steve Davis	7
(England) Ben Woollaston	10
(Wales) Jamie Jones	10
(England) Andy Hicks	9
(England) Robert Milkins	10
(China) Xiao Guodong	4
(Northern Ireland) Gerard Greene	10
(Thailand) James Wattana	9
(England) Matthew Selt	5
(China) Yu Delu	10
(England) Nigel Bond	7
(China) Cao Yupeng	10
(England) Joe Jogia	10
(Brazil) Igor Figueiredo	7
(England) Michael Holt	9
(Belgium) Luca Brecel	10
(China) Liang Wenbo	10
(England) Justin Astley	3
(England) Mike Dunn	6
(England) David Gilbert	10
(England) Jimmy White	8
(China) Liu Chuang	10
(Scotland) Alan McManus	7
(Republic of Ireland) David Morris	10
(England) Rory McLeod	5
(England) Peter Lines	10
(England) Jack Lisowski	3
(England) Alfie Burden	10
(Scotland) Jamie Burnett	10
(England) Adam Duffy	7

Round 5 Best of 19 frames
(Republic of Ireland) Ken Doherty	10
(England) Anthony Hamilton	9
(Wales) Dominic Dale	10
(England) Ben Woollaston	3
(England) Ricky Walden	2
(Wales) Jamie Jones	10
(England) Mark Davis	10
(England) Robert Milkins	5
(Wales) Ryan Day	10
(Northern Ireland) Gerard Greene	8
(Scotland) Stephen Hendry	10
(China) Yu Delu	6
(England) Tom Ford	9
(China) Cao Yupeng	10
(Hong Kong) Marco Fu	10
(England) Joe Jogia	4
(England) Mark King	8
(Belgium) Luca Brecel	10
(Scotland) Marcus Campbell	9
(China) Liang Wenbo	10
(Republic of Ireland) Fergal O'Brien	4
(England) David Gilbert	10
(England) Jamie Cope	7
(China) Liu Chuang	10
(England) Barry Hawkins	10
(Republic of Ireland) David Morris	4
(England) Andrew Higginson	10
(England) Peter Lines	4
(England) Peter Ebdon	10
(England) Alfie Burden	0
(England) Joe Perry	10
(Scotland) Jamie Burnett	8

== Century breaks ==
=== Main stage centuries ===
A total of 71 century breaks were made during the main stage of the World Championship. For every century break that was made during the 17-day championship in Sheffield, the title sponsor, Betfred, donated £200 to World Snooker's official charity for the 2011/2012 season, Haven House Children's Hospice, with the promise of topping it up to £25,000 if 75 centuries were made. However, Betfred boss Fred Done donated the full £25,000, despite being four centuries short of the target.

- 147, 123, 100 – Stephen Hendry
- 142, 125, 117, 101, 101, 101 – Stephen Maguire
- 141, 130, 128, 117, 113, 110, 107, 104, 103, 101, 100, 100 – Ronnie O'Sullivan
- 138, 136, 135, 134, 132, 127, 101 – Jamie Jones
- 136, 109 – Martin Gould
- 134, 132, 118, 112, 105, 101 – Ali Carter
- 133, 124 – John Higgins
- 131, 108, 106, 106, 100, 100 – Neil Robertson
- 125, 113, 108 – Cao Yupeng
- 123, 122, 116, 101 – Matthew Stevens
- 121 – David Gilbert
- 120, 114 – Judd Trump
- 119, 113, 112, 110, 100 – Ryan Day
- 116 – Luca Brecel
- 115, 103 – Joe Perry
- 111 – Andrew Higginson
- 111 – Mark Williams
- 110, 102 – Stephen Lee
- 104 – Ken Doherty
- 102, 101 – Shaun Murphy
- 101 – Mark Allen
- 100 – Ding Junhui

=== Qualifying stage centuries ===
A total of 60 century breaks were made during the qualifying stage of the World Championship, the highest a maximum break made by Robert Milkins.

- 147 – Robert Milkins
- 145, 128 – Ben Woollaston
- 142, 125 – Jamie Burnett
- 140, 134 – Jamie Jones
- 140, 103 – Aditya Mehta
- 140 – Xiao Guodong
- 139, 138, 103 – Liu Chuang
- 136, 107 – Liang Wenbo
- 135, 124, 100 – David Gilbert
- 134, 112, 110 – Ken Doherty
- 134 – Sam Baird
- 129, 107 – Stephen Hendry
- 128, 102 – Anthony Hamilton
- 127, 125 – Barry Hawkins
- 123 – Adam Duffy
- 122 – Passakorn Suwannawat
- 120 – Daniel Wells
- 117 – Nigel Bond
- 116 – Andy Hicks
- 113, 102 – Jimmy Robertson
- 112, 101 – Ryan Day
- 110, 100 – Marco Fu
- 110 – Peter Lines
- 108 – Luca Brecel
- 108 – Fergal O'Brien
- 107, 103 – Jamie Cope
- 107, 102 – Tom Ford
- 106 – Anthony McGill
- 105 – David Grace
- 105 – Michael Holt
- 105 – David Morris
- 103 – Justin Astley
- 103 – Rod Lawler
- 102 – Peter Ebdon
- 102 – Andrew Pagett
- 101 – Cao Yupeng
- 101 – Adrian Gunnell
- 101 – Liam Highfield
- 100 – David Gray
