= Stephen Hendry =

Scottish snooker player (born 1969)

Stephen Hendry MBE
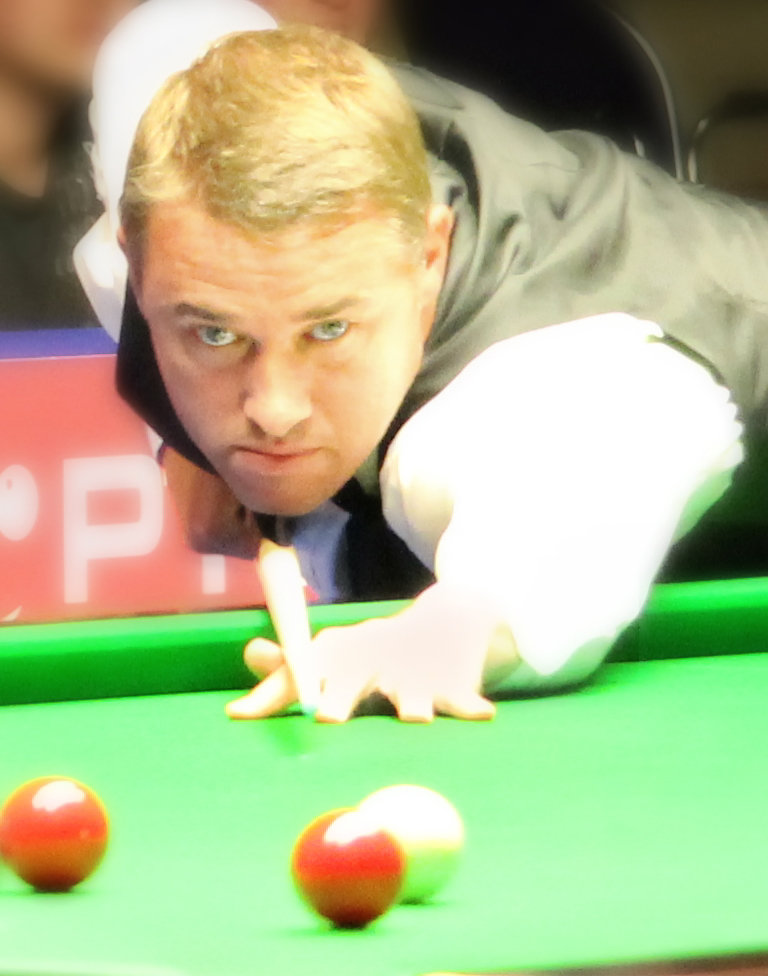
- Hendry in 2011

Personal information
- Nicknames: The King of the Crucible; the Golden Bairn
- Born: 13 January 1969 (age 57) St Leonard's, Edinburgh, Scotland

Sport
- Country: Scotland
- Sport: Snooker
- Professional: 1985–2012, 2020–2024
- Highest ranking: 1 (April 1990 – May 1998, May 2006 – May 2007)
- Maximum breaks: 11
- Century breaks: 777

Tournament wins
- Ranking: 36
- World Championship: 1990; 1992; 1993; 1994; 1995; 1996; 1999

Stephen Gordon Hendry (born 13 January 1969) is a Scottish retired professional snooker player and a current commentator and pundit. He turned professional in 1985, aged 16, and won the 1990 World Snooker Championship at the age of 21 years and 106 days, becoming the sport's youngest World Champion, a record he still holds. He won seven world titles between 1990 and 1999, setting a new modern-era record that he held outright until Ronnie O'Sullivan equalled it in 2022. He is the only player in the modern era to have won the World Championship five consecutive times.

Hendry also won the Masters six times (including a record five consecutively) and the UK Championship five times for a career total of 18 Triple Crown titles, a total exceeded only by O'Sullivan's 23. He is one of three players to have won all three Triple Crown events in a single season and the only player to have achieved the feat twice. His 36 ranking titles are second only to O'Sullivan's 41, and his nine seasons as world number one are the most by any player under the annual ranking system used until 2010. He made 11 maximum breaks in professional competition, putting him in third place behind O'Sullivan (17) and John Higgins (13). Awarded an MBE in the 1993 Birthday Honours, he was twice named the BBC Scotland Sports Personality of the Year, in 1987 and 1996.

Hendry's career declined in the 2000s, his play increasingly affected by the condition called the yips. He reached the last of his nine world finals at the 2002 World Championship but lost in a deciding frame to Peter Ebdon. He reached the last of his 57 ranking finals at the 2006 UK Championship, again losing to Ebdon. After falling out of the elite top 16 during the 2011–12 season, he retired after the 2012 World Championship, aged 43. He accepted an invitational tour card in 2020 and competed sporadically on the professional tour over four seasons, but retired again in 2024.

== Early life ==
Hendry's parents, Gordon Hendry and Irene Rixson, met as teenagers in the late 1960s while working at a woollen merchant in Edinburgh. After Irene became pregnant, she and Gordon moved into a bedroom of his grandmother's flat in St Leonard's, Edinburgh. Irene was 18 years old when she gave birth to Stephen Gordon Hendry on 13 January 1969. The family subsequently moved to Gorgie and moved again to Baberton Mains after Hendry's younger brother was born in 1972. Hendry's father was then working in the fruit and vegetable wholesale business.

By the late 1970s, Hendry's father and a business partner were running three greengrocer's shops in Inverkeithing, Dalgety Bay, and Dunfermline. The family moved to a bungalow in Dalgety Bay when Hendry was nine and lived there for the next six years, during which time he began attending Inverkeithing High School. He started playing snooker at age 12 when his parents bought him a miniature snooker table for Christmas in 1981. He soon began playing on full-sized tables at Maloco's Snooker Hall and the Classic Snooker Centre in Dunfermline, making his first century break a few months after his 13th birthday. At this time, Hendry's snooker hero was Jimmy White. He later wrote that when he saw White at an exhibition match, he felt that "The charm and skill of the man is undeniable and yet, for all my attacking play and determination to clear the table quickly, I'm beginning to realise that I don't share Jimmy's colourful personality."

When Hendry was 15, his parents separated. Due to financial difficulties caused by his father's problem gambling, they had to sell their house and business interests. Hendry's mother moved with her two sons to a council house in her hometown of Kirkliston, and Hendry began attending Queensferry High School. His father moved to a flat in nearby Broxburn and travelled frequently with Hendry to snooker tournaments around the country.

== Career ==
=== Amateur years (1982–1985) ===
Hendry's first tournament win was an under-16 "Stars of the Future" event at a Pontins holiday camp in Prestatyn, Wales, when he was 14. After winning both the Scottish and British Under-16 Championships, he made his first televised appearance in 1983 on Junior Pot Black, where he defeated Nick Pearce but lost to Steve Ventham in the semi-finals. In 1984, he became the youngest ever winner of the Scottish Amateur Championship. At the 1984 World Amateur Snooker Championship, he became the youngest player ever to participate in that championship. He placed sixth in his qualifying group of nine participants and did not qualify for the final stages. He discussed his snooker career with his father and they agreed that he would seek to turn professional as they felt, according to Hendry, that he "couldn't learn anything as an amateur ... If I wanted to learn I had to be in with the big boys."

In February 1985, his application for professional status was accepted by the World Professional Billiards and Snooker Association. Two months later, he retained the Scottish Amateur Championship. Aged 16 years, he was then the sport's youngest professional. From the age of 14 he had been managed by Ron Clover, who also managed darts player Jocky Wilson, but when he was 16 Ian Doyle and Jim Marley took over his management after paying Clover £2,000. Doyle, who was influenced by Barry Hearn's style of management, arranged for Hendry to play a series of money matches against leading players, mirroring the way that Hearn had arranged matches for Steve Davis before he turned professional.

=== Early professional years (1985–1989) ===
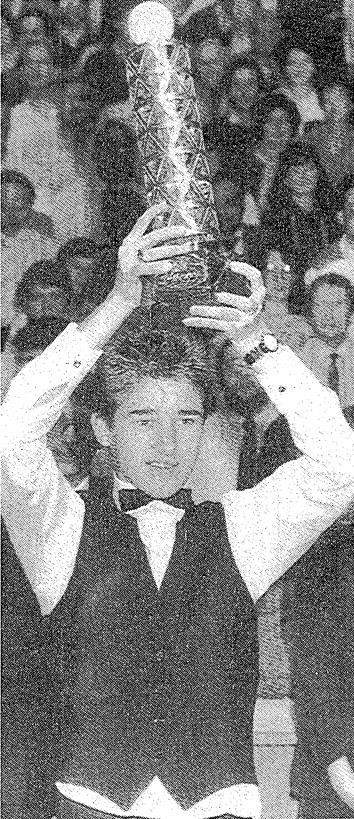
Hendry won his first world ranking title at the 1987 Grand Prix.

In his debut season as a professional, Hendry earned his first ranking point at the 1986 Classic, eliminating Dessie Sheehan, Graham Miles, and Silvino Francisco before losing 4–5 to Neal Foulds. He also won the 1986 Scottish Professional Championship, becoming the youngest player to win any national professional title. He won four qualifying matches to reach the main stage of the 1986 World Snooker Championship, losing 8–10 to Willie Thorne in the first round. Aged 17 years and 3 months, he was then the youngest player to compete at the final stages of a world championship, a record he held for 26 years until Luca Brecel made his Crucible debut in 2012, aged two months younger.

In his 2025 book Pots of Gold, snooker journalist David Hendon wrote that from the start of Hendry's professional career, it was evident that he was unlike most other professionals: "The percentage game long favoured by established professionals and taken to new levels by [Steve] Davis was jettisoned in favour of all-out attack." Davis had won the World Snooker Championship in 1981, 1983 and 1984, and had held the top position in the world rankings since the 1983–84 list. Hendry studied Davis's detachment from other players, and his professional attitude to preparation. Hendon quotes Hendry as saying: "I looked at Steve Davis and thought, 'That's where I want to be. Nothing less would be good enough.'"

After turning professional, Hendry felt that his technique would benefit from some "tweaking", and Doyle arranged for him to meet coach Frank Callan, who had previously worked with Steve Davis, Terry Griffiths, and John Parrott; this was originally envisaged as a short-term engagement, but extended over several years. Callan noticed that Hendry had a "pumping" cue action and suggested that he should have a brief pause before striking the cue ball. This helped Hendry focus, which led to improvements in his long potting. Callan also persuaded Hendry to consider more safety play; before this, Hendry's attitude, as he later described it, was "safety shots ... get in the way of what I want to do, which is pot balls."

In the 1986–87 season, Hendry and Mike Hallett reached the final of the 1986 World Doubles Championship, which they lost 3–12 to Davis and Tony Meo. Hendry reached his first ranking semi-final at the Classic but lost 3–9 to Davis. He then retained his Scottish Professional Championship title. Having won three qualifying matches to reach the main stage of the 1987 World Championship, he eliminated Thorne and Steve Longworth to progress to the quarter-finals. He lost 12–13 to defending champion Joe Johnson, despite coming from 1–8 and 8–12 behind to force a deciding frame.

Hendry defeated Hallett to win the invitational 1987 Australian Masters, and was runner-up to Davis at the 1987 Hong Kong Masters. At the 1987 Fidelity International Open, he reached the semi-finals, where he lost 1–9 to Cliff Thorburn, later describing that match as "a pasting which barely sees me out of my chair." He won his first ranking title at the 1987 Grand Prix, beating Taylor 10–7 in the final; at the time, he was the youngest winner of a ranking title. He defeated three members of the top 16 to reach the final, including Davis. In 2018, Hendry wrote that he had been analysing videos of his past matches against Davis and realised that he would benefit from playing more safety shots, which he did during his defeat of Davis. Following the final, he commented that "I learned a lot from the match against Thorburn in the Fidelity and from various matches against [Steve] Davis". Taylor remarked that Hendry was "just what the game needs."

Hendry and Hallett won the 1987 World Doubles Championship, defeating Taylor and Thorburn 12–8 in the final. Hendry captured his second ranking title at the British Open with a 13–2 victory against Hallett in the final. He also won his third consecutive Scottish Professional Championship, after which Doyle said that he would not be defending that title because "Stephen's fellow Scottish professionals are not good enough to test him." At the 1988 World Snooker Championship, Hendry lost 12–13 to White in the second round after leading 10–7. He was named the BBC Scotland Sports Personality of the Year for 1987, and reached number four in the 1988–89 snooker world rankings.

Although he failed to win a ranking title during the 1988–89 season, he was runner-up to Doug Mountjoy at the 1988 UK Championship and won the 1989 Masters on his debut, defeating John Parrott 9–6 in the final. In the 1989 Irish Masters final, he led Alex Higgins 4–0 and was later two frames ahead with three to play, but lost 8–9. He reached his first world championship semi-final in 1989 but lost 9–16 to the eventual champion Davis. He moved up a place to third in the 1989–90 rankings, behind Davis and Parrott.

=== World Champion and world number one (1989–1999) ===
The 1989–90 season saw Hendry defeat James Wattana in the final of the ranking 1989 Asian Open and beat Terry Griffiths to win the invitational 1989 Scottish Masters. He took another ranking title at the 1989 Dubai Classic. He won his first UK Championship, defeating Davis 16–12 in the final of the 1989 edition after Davis, having lost the first four frames, closed the gap to one frame at 10–11. Hendry remarked after the match that this was "The highest point in my career ... I had to prove I could beat Steve over a long distance." He added that he felt he still had a lot to learn about snooker, and in particular from playing Davis. In retaining the Masters title, defeating Parrott 9–4 in the final, he became only the second player to win the tournament in consecutive years.

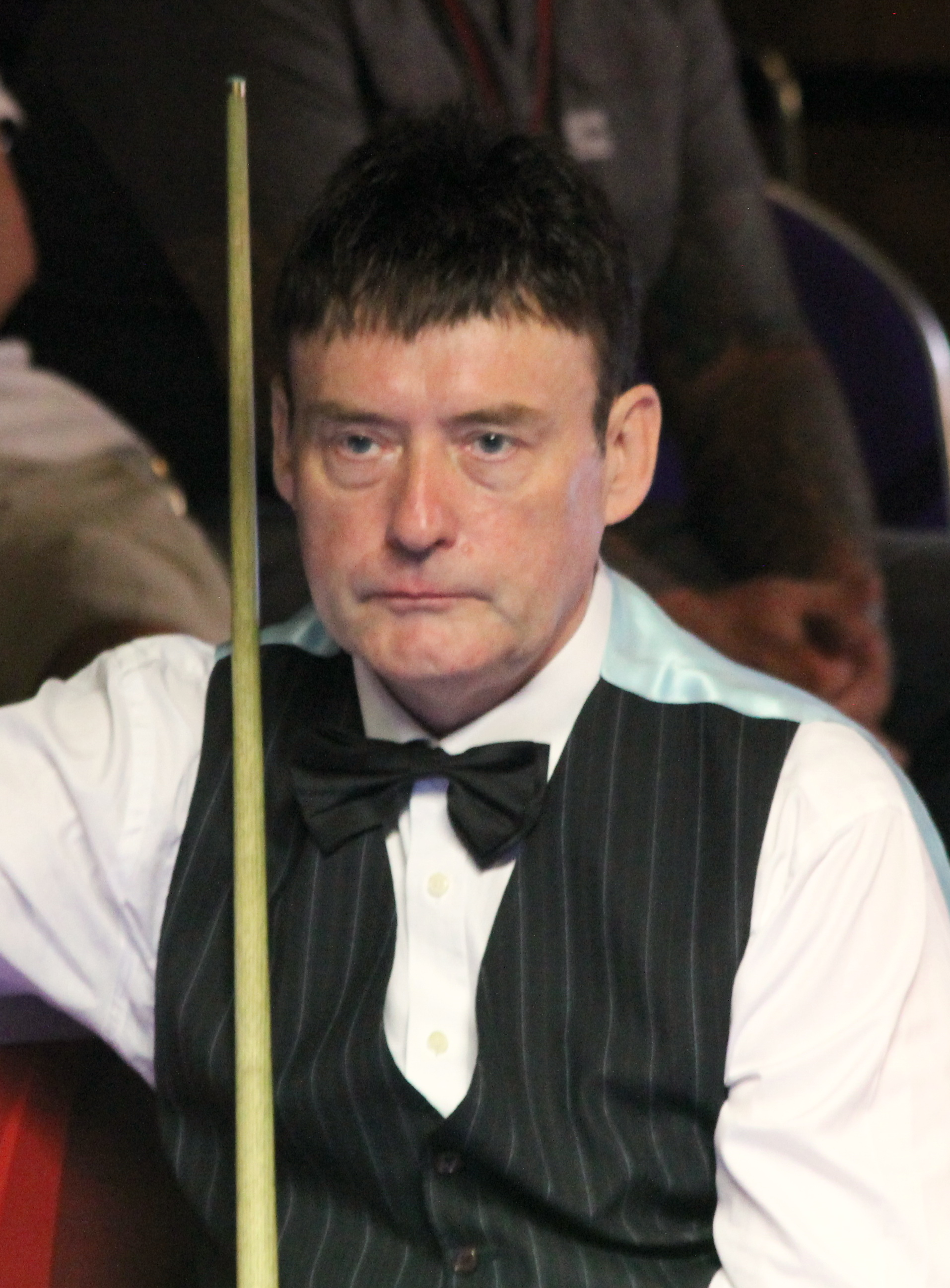
Jimmy White (pictured in 2016) lost four World Snooker Championship finals to Hendry.

He won his first world title at the 1990 tournament, beating Jimmy White 18–12 in the final. He became the second player to win all three Triple Crown events in the same season, (Note: The Triple Crown events are the World Snooker Championship, Masters and UK Championship) after Davis two seasons earlier. Aged 21 years and 106 days, he superseded Alex Higgins as the sport's youngest world champion, a record he still holds as of 2026. In the first round of the championship, he was level at 7–7 with Alain Robidoux before winning 10–7; he then beat Tony Meo in the second round and Darren Morgan in the quarter-finals. He was 0–4 and 9–11 behind against John Parrott in the semi-finals, but won seven consecutive frames for a 16–11 win. The final was described by the snooker journalist Terry Smith as "a two-day high-speed potting battle that left the sell-out crowd virtually breathless." He became world number one for the first time at the end of the season. After this, he gained the Pontins Professional and 1990 London Masters titles.

Hendry became the first player to win five ranking titles in a single season in 1990–91, and equalled Davis's record of eight tournament wins in a season. He won his second UK Championship, defeating Davis 16–15 in the final. Hendry won six of the first seven frames, but Davis recovered to lead 15–14 and was 49–0 ahead in the 30th frame. Hendry won that frame with a break of 57 and then secured the decider to win the title. He won his third Masters, defeating Hallett 9–8 in the final after trailing 0–7 and 2–8. However, he failed to retain his world title at the 1991 World Championship; he lost 11–13 to Steve James in the quarter-finals, despite having led 11–9, falling victim to the Crucible curse. During the season, he earned £694,056.58 in prize money, surpassing the record of £661,490 set by Steve Davis in 1988–89. He retained his place at the top of the world rankings with 85 points; Davis was second, with 57 points.

In the 1991–92 season, he won his fourth Masters, defeating Parrott 9–4 in the final. He won his second world title at the 1992 World Championship, where he came from 8–14 behind against White in the final to win ten consecutive frames for an 18–14 victory. He achieved his first maximum break in professional competition while playing Thorne in the Matchroom League.

During the 1992–93 season, Hendry did not win any significant titles until January 1993, when he beat Drago 5–3 in the 1993 European Challenge, eight months after his world championship victory. He won his fifth consecutive Masters, beating Wattana 9–5 in the final, and took the 1993 International Open by overcoming Davis 10–6. He won his third world title at the 1993 World Championship, defeating White 18–5 in the final with a session to spare, having lost just 25 frames in the tournament. In the 1993 Birthday Honours, Hendry was awarded an MBE for services to snooker.

In the 1993–94 season, he reached the final of the UK Championship but lost 6–10 to 17-year-old Ronnie O'Sullivan, who won his maiden ranking title at the event. Hendry reached a sixth consecutive Masters final but lost 8–9 to his compatriot Alan McManus, his first defeat at the Masters. He won his fourth world title at the 1994 World Championship, despite fracturing his left arm just below the elbow the evening before his second-round match and keeping the arm in a sling when he was not playing. He clinched an 18–17 victory in the deciding frame of the final after White missed a black off the spot. It was the last time White featured in a World Championship final, having lost all six finals he contested, four of them to Hendry. Hendry was behind Davis in the provisional rankings after the Thailand Open and British Open but having defeated Davis in the world championship semi-finals and going on to win the title, he topped the rankings for a fifth consecutive year, with 53,330 points to Davis's 52,330.

In the 1994–95 season, he won the UK Championship, defeating Ken Doherty 10–5 in the final and setting a new record for the most century breaks in a professional match, with seven. Hendry ended the season by winning the 1995 World Championship, defeating O'Sullivan 13–8 in the quarter-finals, White 16–12 in the semi-finals, and Nigel Bond 18–9 in the final to claim his fifth world title. His break of 147 in the semi-final against White was only the third maximum in the history of the championship. During the season he also won the Top Rank Classic, European Open, Charity Challenge, and the European League, which contributed to record prize money of £740,550 in a single season. This took him over £4 million in career prize money, the highest career prize money earnings ever.

Hendry again won all three Triple Crown events in the 1995–96 season: He beat Peter Ebdon 10–3 to win his fourth UK Championship, defeated O'Sullivan 10–5 to win his sixth Masters, and won 18–12 against Ebdon in the 1996 World Championship final. It was his sixth world title, equalling the modern-era record held by Ray Reardon and Steve Davis. Hendry remains the only player to win all three Triple Crown events in two different seasons. He was named the BBC Scotland Sports Personality of the Year for a second time in 1996.

In the 1996–97 season, Hendry won his fifth UK Championship, coming from 8–9 behind to defeat John Higgins 10–9 in the final. In the best-of-17 Liverpool Victoria Charity Challenge final, he led O'Sullivan 8–2 but O'Sullivan won six consecutive frames to take the match to a deciding frame. However, Hendry won the decider with a maximum break for a 9–8 victory. At the 1997 World Championship, he reached a sixth consecutive world final but lost 12–18 to Doherty, his first defeat in a world final and his first loss at the Crucible since 1991. His 29 consecutive victories at the Crucible over that period remains a record as of 2026.

He lost the 1997 UK Championship final 6–10 to O'Sullivan. In the 1998 Masters final, he led Williams 9–6, needing just one frame for victory. However, Williams took the match to a deciding frame and went on to win on a re-spotted black. Hendry won his only ranking title of the 1997–98 season, the 1998 Thailand Masters, with a 9–6 victory over Parrott. It was his 29th ranking title, a new record, surpassing the 28 ranking titles won by Steve Davis. At the 1998 World Championship, Hendry lost 4–10 to White in the first round. After eight consecutive seasons as world number one, he fell to second place in the rankings behind the new world champion John Higgins. At the end of the season, he ended his working relationship with Callan cordially.

In the 1998–99 season, he experienced a 0–9 whitewash to world number 73 Marcus Campbell in the first round of the UK Championship. It was then the heaviest professional defeat of Hendry's career, surpassing his 1–9 loss to Thorburn in the semi-finals of the 1987 International Open. Afterwards, Hendry stated that his confidence had "drained and drained" and that he would have to go "back to the drawing board" to recover his form. A couple of weeks later, he won the Malta Grand Prix, but then had consecutive quarter-final defeats by Tony Drago, a player who had never beaten him in 12 previous encounters, at the German Masters and Irish Open. He had a session with Del Hill, coach of Ronnie O'Sullivan, but did not find it helpful. John Carroll, Hendry's driver and "road manager", arranged for Callan to watch Hendry in a match, after which Hendry and Callan started working together again. Callan pointed out that Hendry was unintentionally putting side on the cue ball when striking it, which Hendry then rectified, and encouraged Hendry to practice more. Hendry lost to Drago again at the 1999 Masters, the first time that Hendry had lost in his opening match at the event. Soon afterwards, he won the Scottish Open and later that season he won the Irish Masters.

At the 1999 World Championship, he started with a 10–8 defeat of Paul Hunter, which Hendry described as a "tough match", then progressed past James Wattana and Matthew Stevens. He defeated O'Sullivan 17–13 in the semi-finals and Williams 18–11 in the final to win his seventh and last world title at age 30. Hendry held the modern-era record of seven world titles outright for the next 23 years, until O'Sullivan equalled it in 2022. After the match, Hendry said that the win was "worth more to me than the other six championships put together" and acknowledged Callan's help.

=== Later career and retirement (1999–2012) ===
In the 1999–2000 season, Hendry won the British Open, where he made the fifth 147 break of his career, which was also the first maximum made in a ranking final. He also reached the final of the 2000 Thailand Masters. However, he suffered a surprise 7–10 defeat to debutant Stuart Bingham in the first round of the 2000 World Championship. He ended the season ranked third, his lowest placing since 1989.

In 2000–01, Hendry failed to win any ranking titles for the first time since the 1988–89 season, although he was runner-up at the 2001 Thailand Masters. He dropped to fifth in the rankings. In the following season, he won the European Open and came close to an eighth world title at the 2002 World Championship, where he defeated the defending champion O'Sullivan 17–13 in the semi-finals but lost 17–18 to Ebdon in the final. This was Hendry's last appearance in a World Championship final, after featuring in nine of the thirteen finals held between 1990 and 2002. He made 16 centuries during the 2002 event, a record that stood outright for the next 20 years until Mark Williams equalled it in 2022.

Hendry won the Welsh Open in the 2002–03 season and the British Open in the 2003–04 season. Returning from the Euro-Asia Masters Challenge in September 2003, he had his cue broken in the luggage hold of his international flight, where players had been required to stow their cues since the 11 September 2001 attacks. Hendry had used the Rex Williams-branded Powerglide cue since he was 14. He reached the semi-finals of the 2004 World Championship but lost 4–17 to O'Sullivan with a session to spare. In the 2004–05 season, he was runner-up at the Welsh Open, losing 8–9 to O'Sullivan. The following month, he defeated Graeme Dott 9–7 to win the Malta Cup, his 36th and last ranking title.

Hendry regained the world number one ranking for the 2005–06 season due to his consistency in reaching the latter stages of tournaments without, by his own admission, reproducing his form of old. He commented that, "It's not the way I would have liked to get back to number one but the facts and figures don't lie." He added that he had been "in the doldrums" three years previously, but credited his coach Terry Griffiths with helping his revival. It was his ninth season as world number one, which was a record. The following season, Hendry took a 4–1 lead over O'Sullivan in the 2006 UK Championship quarter-finals, only for O'Sullivan to concede the best-of-17-frame match during the sixth frame. After O'Sullivan walked out of the arena, Hendry was awarded a 9–1 win. He came from 5–7 down in the semi-finals to defeat Dott 9–7 but lost the final 6–10 to Ebdon. It was the last time Hendry reached a ranking final. At the end of the 2007–08 season, despite not winning any tournaments, he rose two places in the rankings to sixth, and set a new record of 21 consecutive seasons in the top 16.

In the quarter-finals of the 2009 World Championship, he made a maximum break against Shaun Murphy, but lost the match 11–13. Aged 40, he was at the time the oldest player to make a maximum in a ranking tournament and the second player after O'Sullivan to make more than one 147 at the Crucible. Hendry ended the season ranked 10th, the first time he had been outside the top eight since the 1987–88 season.

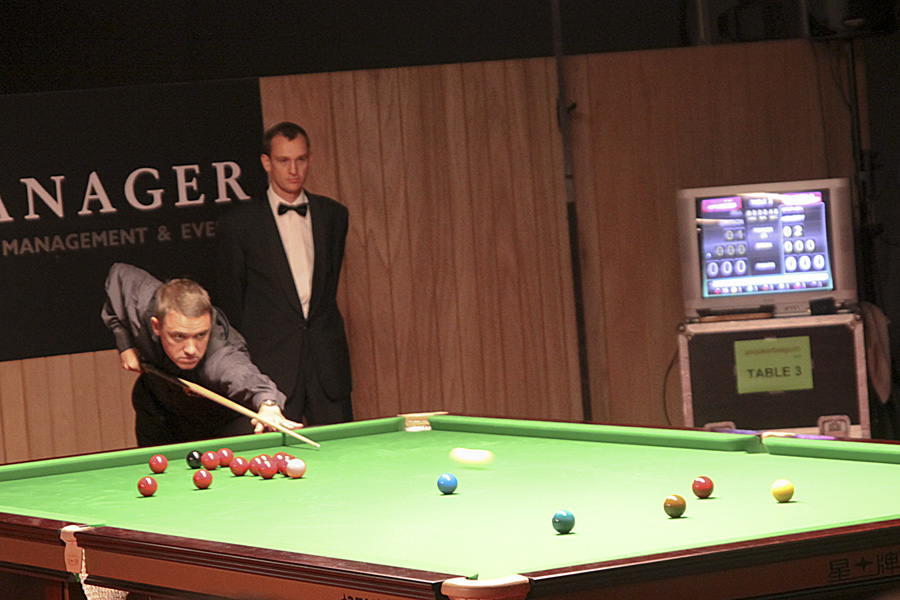
Hendry at the Brugge Open 2010

In the 2010–11 season, Hendry defeated White 9–8 in the first round of the 2010 UK Championship but lost 6–9 in the second round to Williams. Afterward, he expressed his frustration with his form and revealed that he had been suffering from "the yips" for ten years, leaving him unable to cue through the ball and causing him to miss routine shots. He made his tenth professional maximum break at the Welsh Open against Stephen Maguire but lost the match. At the 2011 World Championship, he beat Joe Perry in a first-round decider but again lost in the second round to Selby, this time by a score of 4–13. Hendry was becoming frustrated with his lack of success at tournaments, and agreed with his wife Mandy that he would continue playing for another season, and then retire if he did not achieve success. He later wrote, "Having only just turned forty it seems somewhat premature, but I don't think I can spend much longer putting up with such humiliation, match after match, tournament after tournament, season after season."

In the 2011–12 season, after losing to Robert Milkins in the first round of the Shanghai Masters, Hendry fell to 21st in the world rankings, ending his 23 years in the top 16 and meaning that he had to qualify to reach the main stages of subsequent ranking events. After losing to Maguire in the last-32 round of the 2011 UK Championship, Hendry was invited by IMG, producers of the BBC TV coverage, to commentate on the semi-finals and final. During a visit to China to play an exhibition match, he discussed the possibility of working with Chinese billiard table manufacturers Joy to promote Chinese eight-ball. Hendry was still very unhappy with his tournament results, and on his return to the UK he agreed with Mandy that he would accept the company's offer, and retire from competition after the 2012 World Championship. He missed the Masters in 2012 for the first time since his 1989 debut.

He lost 1–5 to Wattana in the German Masters qualifiers, failing to reach the final stages of a ranking tournament for the first time in 15 years. He qualified for the Welsh Open by whitewashing Kurt Maflin 4–0 and then defeated reigning Masters champion Robertson 4–1 in the first round. However, he lost 0–4 to Mark Allen in the second round. Hendry played Robertson again in the first round of the World Open but lost 3–5. Hendry defeated Yu Delu 5–1 to qualify for the China Open, where he defeated Martin Gould 5–4 in the first round, winning on the final black. He played Robertson for the third consecutive time in a ranking event but lost 3–5.

Hendry ensured he would make his 27th consecutive appearance at the main stage of the 2012 World Championship when he defeated Yu 10–6 in the qualifiers. He made a 147 in his 10–4 first-round defeat of Bingham, his third maximum break at the Crucible and the 11th of his career. He defeated the defending champion Higgins 13–4 in the second round, his first victory over Higgins in a ranking event since 2003, to reach his 19th world quarter-final. However, after losing 2–13 to Maguire in the quarter-finals, Hendry announced his retirement from professional snooker at the age of 43, citing dissatisfaction with his standard of play and difficulty balancing competitive, commercial, and personal commitments. He stated that he had decided three months earlier to retire at the end of the season. He accepted IMG's invitation to work as a pundit on the BBC during the final. He went on to become a regular commentator on the BBC.

=== Return to the professional tour and second retirement (2020–2024) ===
In August 2020, Hendry reached the semi-finals of the World Seniors Championship. The following month, citing improvements in his form and confidence, he accepted a two-year invitational tour card to the main World Snooker Tour for the 2020–21 and 2021–22 seasons. After delaying his return to competition several times during the 2020–21 season, he played his first professional match in almost nine years at the 2021 Gibraltar Open, losing 1–4 to Matthew Selt in the first round. At the 2021 World Championship, he won his first-round qualifier 6–3 against Jimmy White, but he lost 1–6 to Xu Si in the second qualifying round.

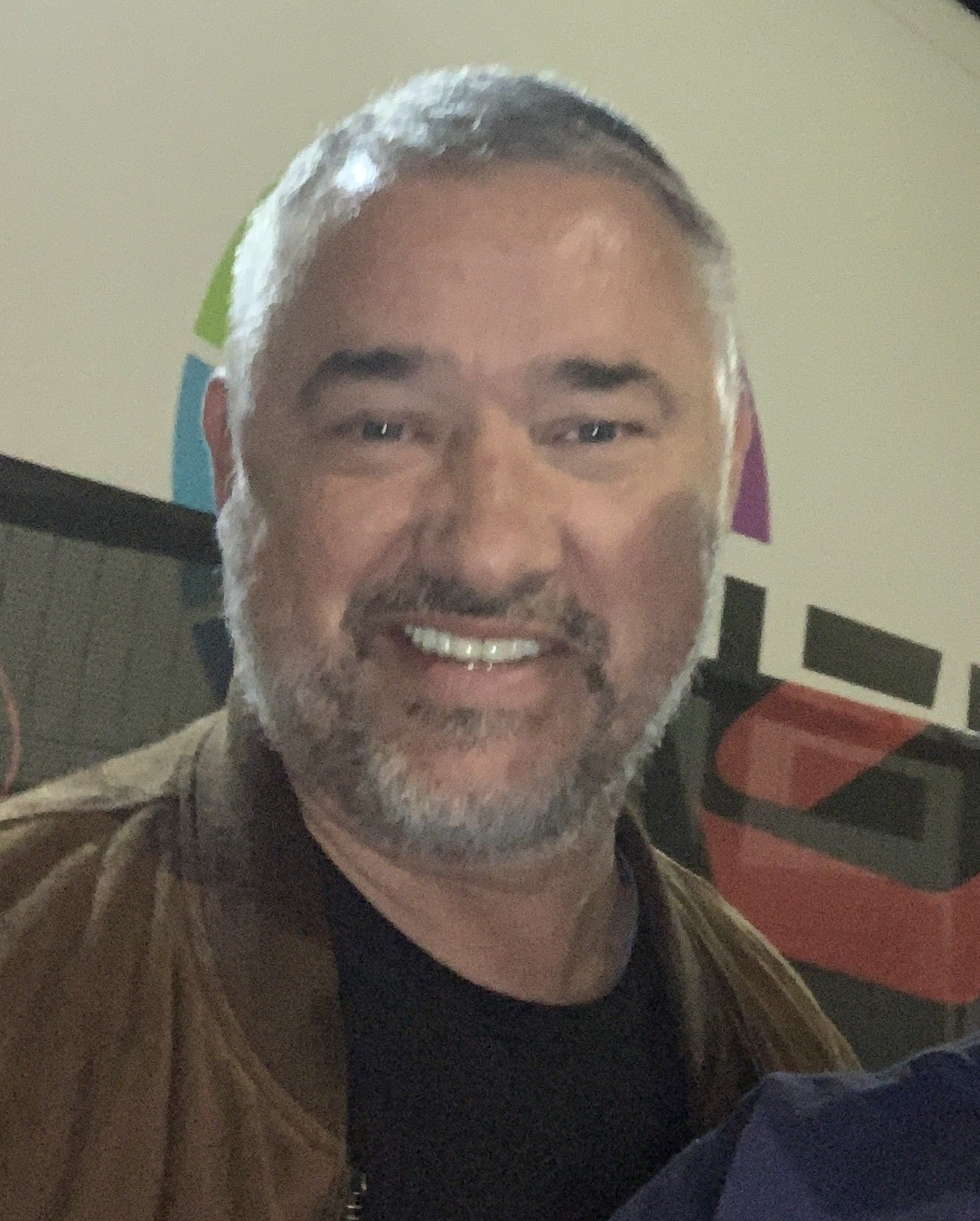
Hendry in 2024

During the 2021–22 season, Hendry competed in six ranking events between August and November but did not progress beyond the last 64 in any of them. He defeated Chris Wakelin 3–2 in the first round of the 2021 British Open, but was whitewashed 0–3 by Gary Wilson in the second round. He defeated Michael White 4–1 to qualify for the 2021 English Open, but was whitewashed 0–4 in the first round by Wakelin, scoring just 18 points in the match. He lost 0–4 to Allan Taylor in the 2021 Scottish Open qualifiers, 3–5 to Li Hang in the January 2022 European Masters qualifiers, and 2–5 to Gao Yang in the 2022 German Masters qualifiers. After a 1–6 defeat to Thepchaiya Un-Nooh in the first round of the 2021 UK Championship, he did not compete in any further professional events for the remainder of the season. He opted not to enter the 2022 World Championship qualifiers, stating that he had not been practising enough to be competitive, but confirmed that he intended to continue on the tour.

In April 2022, Hendry's invitational tour card was renewed for a further two seasons, despite complaints from some players and concerns from snooker's governing body about his limited participation on the tour. His 2022–23 season began with a 0–5 whitewash by Mark Joyce in qualifying for the 2022 European Masters and a 1–4 defeat to Zhang Anda in qualifying for the 2022 British Open. He withdrew from the 2022 Northern Ireland Open and also withdrew from the 2022 UK Championship when the qualifying schedule conflicted with his broadcasting work for ITV at the 2022 Champion of Champions. He played his third professional match of the season in the 2023 German Masters qualifiers, where he was whitewashed 0–5 by Stevens. At the 2023 World Championship, he lost 4–10 in the first qualifying round to James Cahill, his ex-wife's nephew, after which he said he still had "a very distant dream" that he would one day compete at the Crucible again.

Hendry's 2023–24 season began with a 2–4 defeat to Muhammad Asif in qualifying for the 2023 British Open. After losing 0–4 to Fergal O'Brien in qualifying for the 2023 English Open, Hendry stated in a podcast interview that he was considering retiring again, calling his performances "embarrassing" and acknowledging that he had not been practicing for events. He led Tian Pengfei 2–0 in the 2023 International Championship qualifiers but lost the match 3–6. He lost 2–4 to Stevens in qualifying for the 2023 Northern Ireland Open and lost by the same score to Ross Muir in qualifying for the 2024 Welsh Open. He opted not to enter the 2024 World Snooker Championship qualifiers, and thus finished a second consecutive season without a professional win. In June 2024, he declined the World Snooker Tour's offer to renew his invitational tour card for a further two seasons. This marked his second retirement from professional snooker. "I know the game inside out, I still know all the shots, but unfortunately the body is not performing like my brain wants it to," he stated. He had lost 17 of the 20 professional matches he played since returning to the tour, including 14 consecutive defeats.

== Legacy ==
Steve Davis was a big influence on Hendry, in terms of technique but also in the way that he behaved like a winner and did not associate with other players. Hendry, according to author Brendan Cooper, "developed his own ethos too, taking things beyond the Davisian paradigm and managing, somehow, to become a more lethal assassin." While Davis balanced break-building with safety play, Hendry disliked safety play and favoured attack; Cooper commented that Hendry "tore to pieces the old wisdom that all-out attack was too risky by demonstrating that, if you pot everything, nothing is risky." Hendry's brave, aggressive playing style and his focus were highly influential. His favourite shot was to play off the blue to break the pack of reds; while he was not the first to play this shot, he did play it earlier in a frame than others at the time did. In his own assessment, he "brought an aggression to the game and a style of going for everything, no matter how risky."

In their 2005 book Masters of the Baize, Luke Williams and Paul Gadsby rated Hendry as the greatest player of all time, writing that a significant factor in this was "playing to his maximum potential under the highest amounts of pressure". At the time of his initial retirement in 2012, Hendry was the most successful player in professional snooker history. He had earned almost £9 million in prize money, more than any other player. He held records for the most world titles in the modern era (7), the most ranking titles (36), the most Triple Crown titles (18), the most centuries in professional competition (775), and (jointly with Ronnie O'Sullivan) the most maximum breaks (11). His 36 consecutive victories in ranking events between March 1990 and January 1991 and his 29 consecutive wins at the Crucible between 1992 and 1997 also remain modern-era records. One of three players to have won all three Triple Crown events in a single season, he remains the only player to have achieved the feat twice, in the 1989–90 and 1995–96 seasons. Following his 2012 retirement, The Times snooker correspondent Hector Nunns wrote that Hendry was "widely acknowledged to be the best snooker player to lift a cue". That same year, snooker historian Clive Everton argued that the test of greatness was tournament wins, and that Hendry led Steve Davis and Ronnie O'Sullivan in terms of Triple Crown titles, although O'Sullivan was, at his best, the only player who could make snooker look "preposterously easy".

As of 2026, Ronnie O'Sullivan has equalled Hendry's record of 7 world titles, won 41 ranking titles and 23 Triple Crown titles, and made over 1,300 century breaks in professional competition. Hendry's tally of 36 ranking titles places him second in the all-time list. Hendry's nine seasons as world number one were the most by any player under the annual ranking system used until 2010, and he has spent more weeks as number one than any other player. Hendry reached a total of 777 century breaks after his post-retirement return to competition, but several other players have surpassed him in terms of career century breaks. O'Sullivan now holds the record for the most maximum breaks, with 17, while Higgins is second, with 13. O'Sullivan also now holds the record for the most career prize money, with an estimated £15 million as of 2026, with Higgins in second place, with an estimated £11 million. Sean Ingle, chief sports journalist for The Guardian, continued to make the case for Hendry as the sport's greatest player as of 2022. Hendon wrote in 2025 that "Hendry [was] for so long considered the greatest of all time, until O'Sullivan took one record after another". The snooker journalist Phil Yates regards Hendry as "the greatest pressure player of all time". Shaun Murphy admired Hendry's discipline and sought to emulate his approach; he referred to Hendry as "the ultimate pro".

After O'Sullivan equalled Hendry's seven world titles in 2022, each player paid tribute to the other, with O'Sullivan saying: "[Hendry] used to play six hours a day and didn't miss a ball. There is no one dominating the sport like he did, like Tiger Woods did". Hendry said of O'Sullivan during the 2022 World Championship: "You cannot play better snooker than that. He is just supreme in all departments". More recently, Hendry said that he was content to admit that O'Sullivan was "the greatest ... He's taken the game, in terms of winning, of dominating opponents, scoring, to a level which is incredible." He also remarked that "it's not easy seeing the records go. You've dedicated your whole life to breaking someone else's records, and all of a sudden you see someone doing it to you. Steve Davis has handled that a lot better than I have. I still get pangs of jealousy".

== Personal life ==
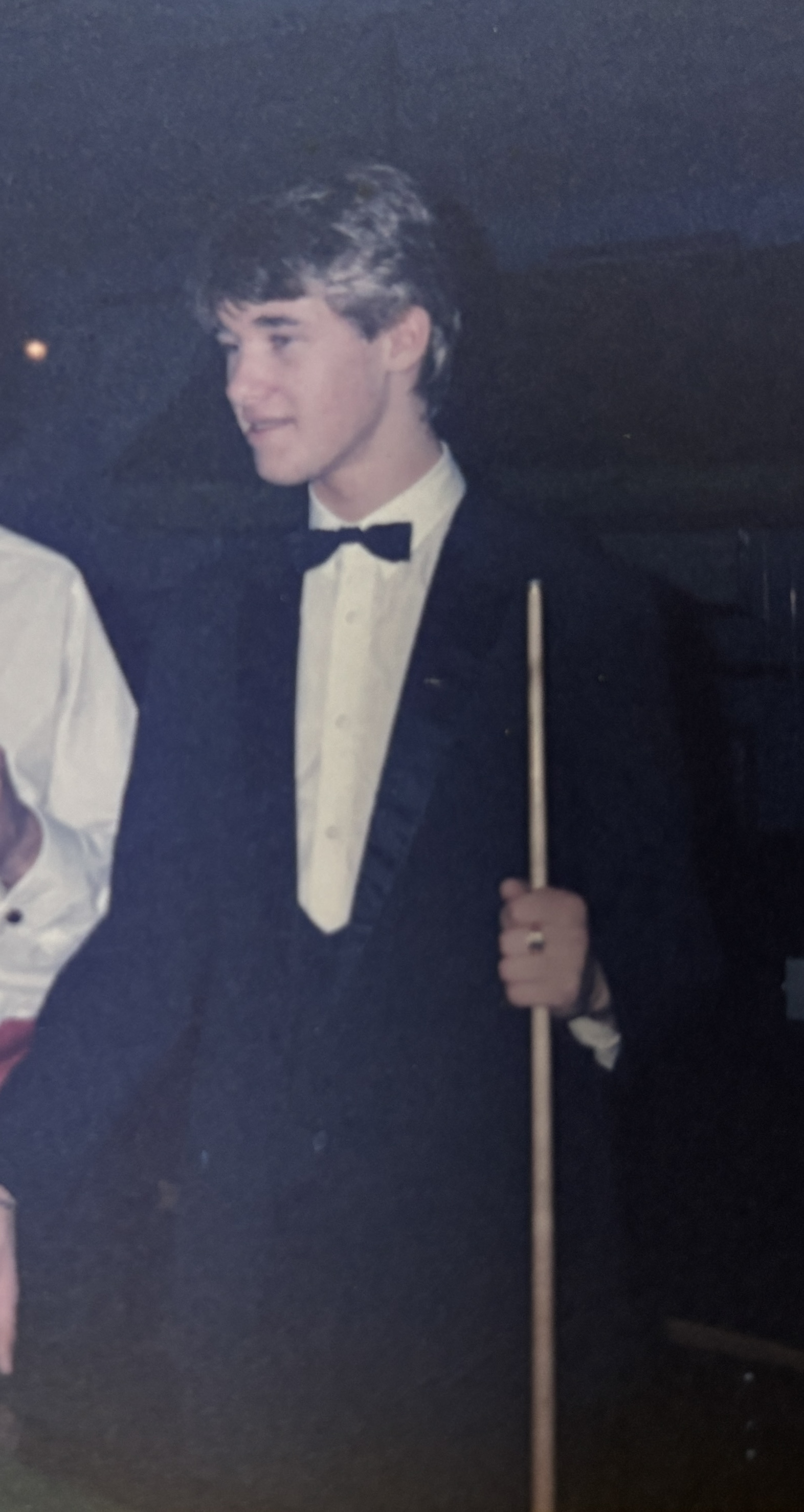
Hendry at an exhibition match in 1987

At the 1984 Pontins Open, 15-year-old Hendry met 16-year-old Amanda ("Mandy") Tart from Blackpool, whose family was accompanying her older sister, Maria (later Cahill), as she competed in the women's division. Hendry and Tart exchanged phone numbers and began pursuing a relationship over the objections of Hendry's manager, Ian Doyle, who feared that a girlfriend would distract Hendry from snooker. In 1987, Doyle blamed Tart for poor results by Hendry and barred her from attending his tournaments, although Hendry later recounted that his driver sometimes smuggled her into his hotel rooms without Doyle's knowledge.

In 1988, after further disputes relating to Tart, Doyle told Hendry he would stop managing him if the relationship continued. Hendry, who later wrote that he had feared for his career, broke up with Tart, but they reunited after his victory at the 1989 Masters and within two years were living together in Scotland. In 1990, several months after winning his first world title, Hendry was the subject of an episode of This Is Your Life, presented by Michael Aspel. Guests included Tart, his parents and other relatives, the veteran commentator Ted Lowe, and fellow professionals Alex Higgins, Cliff Thorburn, Willie Thorne, Terry Griffiths, and Jimmy White.

As Hendry's public profile grew, his home in a South Queensferry estate increasingly attracted attention from fans and sightseers. In late 1992, he received a series of menacing letters and phone calls, and a woman was charged with making threats against him. Hendry later commented that the episode made him more security-conscious. In mid-1993, he and Tart moved to a secluded 19th-century house set on ten acres of woodland in Westfield, West Lothian; Doyle told the press that Hendry had bought it "to get peace and quiet and privacy".

Hendry married Tart in Muthill, Perthshire, on 30 June 1995, shortly after winning his fifth world title. The couple then moved to Auchterarder, near the Gleneagles Hotel, where Hendry was a member of the golf club. Their first son was born in 1996. When their son was eight months old, the couple received an anonymous letter threatening an acid attack against their baby if Hendry won the 1997 World Championship. Hendry later said that the threat left him "rattled" and unable to play to his usual intensity in the final, which he lost 12–18 to Ken Doherty. Hendry and his wife later underwent several rounds of IVF in the hope of having more children. They had a stillborn son in 2003, and another son was born in 2004.

In August 2011, Glasgow Sheriff Court granted an application by HM Revenue and Customs to liquidate Stephen Hendry Snooker Ltd, the company set up to manage Hendry's tournament winnings and sponsorships; HMRC stated in court filings that the company owed more than £85,000 in unpaid tax, plus interest and penalties. At a Snooker Legends exhibition in 2013, Hendry met Lauren Thundow, an actress and children's entertainer 19 years his junior. The following year, he separated from his wife and moved to Berkshire in the south of England to live with Thundow. Saying she was "heartbroken", his wife began divorce proceedings two months later. Hendry referred to the three years between leaving his wife and finalising their divorce as "the most stressful of my life." In 2021, his ex-wife sold their former family home in Auchterarder, which she had received as part of the divorce settlement. As of January 2026, Hendry remained in a relationship with Thundow.

Hendry's father, Gordon, died of cancer in 2017, aged 68. In 2022, Hendry launched a YouTube channel, Stephen Hendry's Cue Tips, featuring instructional content, player interviews, and challenges. As of January 2026, the channel had almost half a million subscribers. Hendry has a single-figure golf handicap.

== Performance and rankings timeline ==
Tournament	1985/ 86	1986/ 87	1987/ 88	1988/ 89	1989/ 90	1990/ 91	1991/ 92	1992/ 93	1993/ 94	1994/ 95	1995/ 96	1996/ 97	1997/ 98	1998/ 99	1999/ 00	2000/ 01	2001/ 02	2002/ 03	2003/ 04		2004/ 05	2005/ 06	2006/ 07	2007/ 08	2008/ 09	2009/ 10	2010/ 11	2011/ 12	2020/ 21	2021/ 22	2022/ 23	2023/ 24	Ref.
Ranking (Note: From the 2010/2011 season it shows the ranking at the beginning of the season)	– (Note: New professionals do not have a world ranking.)	51	23	4	3	1	1	1	1	1	1	1	1	2	2	3	5	6	2		3	2	1	8	6	10	11	16	–	88	–	102	
Ranking tournaments. A dagger (†) denotes a non-ranking edition.
World Open (Note: The event was also called the Professional Players Tournament (1982–83 to 1983–84).)	LQ	QF	W	2R	3R	W	W	1R	2R	QF	W	1R	1R	QF	3R	2R	SF	3R	2R		3R	SF	RR	RR	2R	2R	3R	1R	Not Held			WD	
UK Championship	LQ	1R	1R	F	W	W	SF	QF	F	W	W	W	F	1R	SF	SF	QF	QF	F		1R	SF	F	1R	1R	2R	2R	1R	A	1R	WD	A	
Scottish Open (Note: The event was called the Matchroom Trophy (1985–86), the International Open (1986–87 to 1989–90 and 1993–93 and 1996–97) and the Players Championship (2003–04))	LQ	2R	SF	3R	F	Not Held		W	QF	1R	2R	W	3R	W	3R	2R	QF	3R	QF		Not Held								A	LQ	A	A	
Classic	2R	SF	QF	QF	2R	F	F	Not Held																									
British Open	LQ	LQ	W	3R	1R	W	QF	SF	SF	QF	3R	F	F	QF	W	QF	2R	2R	W		QF	Not Held								2R	LQ	LQ	
Australian Goldfields Open (Note: The event was called the Australian Masters (1985–86 to 198–88 and 1995–96), the Hong Kong Open (1989–90) and the Australian Open (1994–95-1995–96).)	A†	A†	W†	NH	QF	Not Held				A†	A†	Not Held																2R	Not Held				
European Masters (Note: The event also ran under the name Irish Open (1998–99) and the Malta Cup (2004–05 to 2007–08))	Not Held			3R	F	3R	3R	F	W	W	2R	QF	NH	QF	Not Held		W	F	2R		W	QF	QF	RR†	Not Held				A	LQ	LQ	A	
Dubai Classic (Note: The event was also called the Dubai Masters (1988‍–‍89), the Dubai Classic (1989‍–‍90 to 1994‍–‍95), and the Thailand Classic (1995‍–‍96).)	Not Held			A†	W	W	1R	F	W	SF	SF	2R	Not Held																				
Canadian Masters	A†			SF	Not Held																												
Thailand Masters (Note: The event was called the Asian Open (1989–90 to 1992–93) and the Thailand Open (1993–94 to 1996–97))	A†	A†	Not Held		W	W	F†	2R	3R	1R	2R	SF	SF	W	QF	F	F	QF	A†		Not Held				A†	Not Held							
Welsh Open	Not Held						W	3R	QF	QF	3R	W	1R	F	1R	QF	SF	W	QF		F	1R	2R	SF	1R	2R	2R	2R	A	A	A	LQ	
Malta Grand Prix	Not Held									W†	QF	W†	Not Held																				
German Masters (Note: The event was called the German Open (1995–96 to 1997–98))	Not Held										SF	QF	QF	QF†	Not Held												2R	LQ	A	LQ	LQ	A	
China Open (Note: The event also ran under the name China International (1997–98 and 1998–99).)	Not Held												QF†	SF	SF	SF	2R	Not Held			F	QF	1R	1R	QF	QF	2R	2R	Not Held				
Irish Masters	A	A	A	F†	QF†	QF†	W†	SF†	QF†	F†	QF†	W†	QF†	W†	F†	F†	QF†	2R	1R		QF	NH	QF†	Not Held									
Northern Ireland Trophy	Not Held																					F†	2R	2R	1R	Not Held							
Bahrain Championship	Not Held																								SF	Not Held							
Shanghai Masters	Not Held																							2R	1R	2R	1R	1R	NH		A†	A†	
Shoot Out	Not Held					1R†	Not Held																				1R†	2R†	A	A	A	A	
Gibraltar Open	Not Held																												1R	A	Not Held		
English Open	Not Held																												A	1R	A	LQ	
Northern Ireland Open	Not Held																												A	A	WD	LQ	
International Championship	Not Held																															LQ	
World Championship	1R	QF	2R	SF	W	QF	W	W	W	W	W	F	1R	W	1R	QF	F	QF	SF		QF	1R	2R	SF	QF	2R	2R	QF	LQ	A	LQ	A	
Non-ranking tournaments
The Masters	DNQ			W	W	W	W	W	F	QF	W	QF	F	1R	QF	SF	QF	F	1R		QF	1R	SF	1R	1R	1R	1R	DNQ					
Championship League	Not Held																							A	RR	RR	RR	RR	A	A	A	A	
Fosters Professional (Note: The event was also called the Carlsberg Challenge (1984–85 to 1986–87).)	A	A	SF	F	Not Held																												
New Zealand Masters	Not Held			W	SF	Not Held																											
Norwich Union Grand Prix	Not Held			A	F	SF	Not Held																										
London Masters	Not Held			W	W	F	Not Held																										
Kent Classic	NH	A	A	A	A	A	NH	F	Not Held																								
World Matchplay	Not Held			SF	SF	F	SF	QF	Not Held																								
European Challenge	Not Held						W	W	Not Held																								
Belgian Masters	Not Held					SF	A	SF	Not Held		A	Not Held																					
Pontins Professional	SF	QF	SF	A	W	A	A	QF	A	A	A	A	A	A	Not Held																		
Champions Cup (Note: The event was called the Charity Challenge (1994–95 to 1998–99))	Not Held									W	1R	W	SF	QF	W	SF	RR	Not Held															
Scottish Masters	A	QF	QF	NH	W	W	QF	QF	QF	F	W	QF	QF	SF	SF	F	QF	SF	Not Held														
Euro-Asia Masters Challenge	Not Held																		SF	RR	Not Held			RR	Not Held								
Pot Black	A	Not Held					F	A	SF	Not Held												QF	QF	SF	Not Held								
Beijing International Challenge	Not Held																									SF	RR	Not Held					
Scottish Professional Championship	W	W	W	A	Not Held																						SF	Not Held					
Wuxi Classic (Note: The event was called the Jiangsu Classic (2008–09 to 2009–10))	Not Held																								A	RR	QF	A	Not Held				
Premier League (Note: The event was called the Matchroom League (1986–87 to 1991–92) and the European League (1992–93 to 1996–97).)	NH	A	F	RR	F	W	W	A	W	W	SF	F	SF	RR	W	F	A	A	W		SF	F	RR	SF	SF	RR	A	A	Not Held				
Hong Kong Masters (Note: The event was also called the Hong Kong Challenge (1990–91 to 1991–92))	A	A	F	A	NH	SF	W	Not Held																							A	NH	

Performance table legend
LQ	lost in the qualifying draw	#R	lost in the early rounds of the tournament (RR = Round robin)	QF	lost in the quarter-finals
SF	lost in the semi–finals	F	lost in the final	W	won the tournament
DNQ	did not qualify for the tournament	A	did not participate in the tournament	WD	withdrew from the tournament

NH	event was not held.
†	non-ranking edition

The following table lists performances in non-ranking tournaments that Hendry participated in, which were only held once in his professional career:

One-off tournaments
Tournament	Season Held	Performance	Notes	Ref.
1987 Tokyo Masters	1987–88 snooker season	Quarter-finals		
1990 Centenary Challenge	1990–91 snooker season	Winner	Series of matches against Steve Davis	
1991 World Masters	1990–91 snooker season	2nd round		
1991 Indian Challenge	1991–92 snooker season	Winner		
1991 Belgian Challenge	1991–92 snooker season	Runner-up		
1994 Top Rank Classic	1994–95 snooker season	Winner	Five-player round-robin	
1998 Super Challenge	1998–99 snooker season	Runner-up	Six-player round-robin	
1998 Champions Super League	1998–99 snooker season	Winner	Six-player round-robin	
1999 Millennium Cup	1999–2000 snooker season	Semi-finals		
2004 World Champions v Asia Stars Challenge	2004–05 snooker season	Round-robin		
2008 Huangshan Cup	2007–08 snooker season	Quarter-finals		
2009 Legends of Snooker	2009–10 snooker season	Winner		
2011 Hainan Classic	2010–11 snooker season	Round-robin		
2011 Brazil Masters	2011–12 snooker season	Semi-finals		

== Career finals ==
=== Ranking finals: 57 (36 titles) ===
Legend
World Championship (7–2)
UK Championship (5–5)
Other (24–14)

Ranking finals contested by Stephen Hendry
Outcome	No.	Year	Championship	Opponent in the final	Score	Ref.
Winner	1.	1987	Grand Prix	Dennis Taylor (NIR)	10–7	
Winner	2.	1988	British Open	Mike Hallett (ENG)	13–2	
Runner-up	1.	1988	UK Championship	Doug Mountjoy (WAL)	12–16	
Winner	3.	1989	Asian Open	James Wattana (THA)	9–2	
Runner-up	2.	1989	International Open	Steve Davis (ENG)	4–9	
Winner	4.	1989	Dubai Classic	Doug Mountjoy (WAL)	9–2	
Winner	5.	1989	UK Championship	Steve Davis (ENG)	16–12	
Runner-up	3.	1990	European Open	John Parrott (ENG)	6–10	
Winner	6.	1990	World Championship	Jimmy White (ENG)	18–12	
Winner	7.	1990	Grand Prix (2)	Nigel Bond (ENG)	10–5	
Winner	8.	1990	Asian Open (2)	Dennis Taylor (NIR)	9–3	
Winner	9.	1990	Dubai Classic (2)	Steve Davis (ENG)	9–1	
Winner	10.	1990	UK Championship (2)	Steve Davis (ENG)	16–15	
Runner-up	4.	1991	The Classic	Jimmy White (ENG)	4–10	
Winner	11.	1991	British Open (2)	Gary Wilkinson (ENG)	10–9	
Winner	12.	1991	Grand Prix (3)	Steve Davis (ENG)	10–6	
Runner-up	5.	1992	The Classic (2)	Steve Davis (ENG)	8–9	
Winner	13.	1992	Welsh Open	Darren Morgan (WAL)	9–3	
Winner	14.	1992	World Championship (2)	Jimmy White (ENG)	18–14	
Runner-up	6.	1992	Dubai Classic	John Parrott (ENG)	8–9	
Runner-up	7.	1993	European Open (2)	Steve Davis (ENG)	4–10	
Winner	15.	1993	International Open	Steve Davis (ENG)	10–6	
Winner	16.	1993	World Championship (3)	Jimmy White (ENG)	18–5	
Winner	17.	1993	Dubai Classic (3)	Steve Davis (ENG)	9–3	
Runner-up	8.	1993	UK Championship (2)	Ronnie O'Sullivan (ENG)	6–10	
Winner	18.	1993	European Open	Ronnie O'Sullivan (ENG)	9–5	
Winner	19.	1994	World Championship (4)	Jimmy White (ENG)	18–17	
Winner	20.	1994	UK Championship (3)	Ken Doherty (IRL)	10–5	
Winner	21.	1994	European Open (2)	John Parrott (ENG)	9–3	
Winner	22.	1995	World Championship (5)	Nigel Bond (ENG)	18–9	
Winner	23.	1995	Grand Prix (4)	John Higgins (SCO)	9–5	
Winner	24.	1995	UK Championship (4)	Peter Ebdon (ENG)	10–3	
Winner	25.	1996	World Championship (6)	Peter Ebdon (ENG)	18–12	
Winner	26.	1996	UK Championship (5)	John Higgins (SCO)	10–9	
Winner	27.	1997	Welsh Open (2)	Mark King (ENG)	9–2	
Winner	28.	1997	International Open (2)	Tony Drago (MLT)	9–1	
Runner-up	9.	1997	British Open	Mark Williams (WAL)	2–9	
Runner-up	10.	1997	World Championship	Ken Doherty (IRL)	12–18	
Runner-up	11.	1997	UK Championship (3)	Ronnie O'Sullivan (ENG)	6–10	
Winner	29.	1998	Thailand Masters (3)	John Parrott (ENG)	9–6	
Runner-up	12.	1998	British Open (2)	John Higgins (SCO)	8–9	
Runner-up	13.	1999	Welsh Open	Mark Williams (WAL)	8–9	
Winner	30.	1999	Scottish Open (3)	Graeme Dott (SCO)	9–1	
Winner	31.	1999	World Championship (7)	Mark Williams (WAL)	18–11	
Winner	32.	1999 (Sep)	British Open (3)	Peter Ebdon (ENG)	9–5	
Runner-up	14.	2000	Thailand Masters	Mark Williams (WAL)	5–9	
Runner-up	15.	2001	Thailand Masters (2)	Ken Doherty (IRL)	3–9	
Winner	33.	2001	European Open (3)	Joe Perry (ENG)	9–2	
Runner-up	16.	2002	World Championship (2)	Peter Ebdon (ENG)	17–18	
Winner	34.	2003	Welsh Open (3)	Mark Williams (WAL)	9–5	
Runner-up	17.	2003	European Open (3)	Ronnie O'Sullivan (ENG)	6–9	
Winner	35.	2003	British Open (4)	Ronnie O'Sullivan (ENG)	9–6	
Runner-up	18.	2003	UK Championship (4)	Matthew Stevens (WAL)	8–10	
Runner-up	19.	2005	Welsh Open (2)	Ronnie O'Sullivan (ENG)	8–9	
Winner	36.	2005	Malta Cup (4)	Graeme Dott (SCO)	9–7	
Runner-up	20.	2005	China Open	Ding Junhui (CHN)	5–9	
Runner-up	21.	2006	UK Championship (5)	Peter Ebdon (ENG)	6–10	

=== Non-ranking finals: 64 (39 titles) ===
Legend
Legend
The Masters (6–3)
Premier League (6–5)
Other (27–17)

Non-ranking finals contested by Stephen Hendry
Outcome	No.	Year	Championship	Opponent in the final	Score	Ref.
Winner	1.	1986	Scottish Professional Championship	Matt Gibson (SCO)	10–5	
Winner	2.	1987	Scottish Professional Championship (2)	Jim Donnelly (SCO)	10–7	
Winner	3.	1987	Australian Masters	Mike Hallett (ENG)	371–226 pts	
Runner-up	1.	1987	Hong Kong Masters	Steve Davis (ENG)	3–9	
Winner	4.	1988	Scottish Professional Championship (3)	Murdo MacLeod (SCO)	10–4	
Runner-up	2.	1988	Matchroom League	Steve Davis (ENG)	RR	
Winner	5.	1988	New Zealand Masters	Mike Hallett (ENG)	6–1	
Runner-up	3.	1988	Fosters Professional	Mike Hallett (ENG)	5–8	
Winner	6.	1989	The Masters	John Parrott (ENG)	9–6	
Runner-up	4.	1989	Irish Masters	Alex Higgins (NIR)	8–9	
Winner	7.	1989	London Masters	John Parrott (ENG)	4–2	
Winner	8.	1989	Scottish Masters	Terry Griffiths (WAL)	10–1	
Runner-up	5.	1989	Norwich Union Grand Prix	Joe Johnson (ENG)	3–5	
Winner	9.	1990	The Masters (2)	John Parrott (ENG)	9–4	
Winner	10.	1990	Pontins Professional	Mike Hallett (ENG)	9–6	
Winner	11.	1990	London Masters (2)	John Parrott (ENG)	4–2	
Runner-up	6.	1990	Matchroom League (2)	Steve Davis (ENG)	RR	
Winner	12.	1990	Scottish Masters (2)	Terry Griffiths (WAL)	10–6	
Runner-up	7.	1990	World Matchplay	Jimmy White (ENG)	9–18	
Winner	13.	1990	Centenary Challenge	Steve Davis (ENG)	19–11 agg.	
Winner	14.	1991	The Masters (3)	Mike Hallett (ENG)	9–8	
Winner	15.	1991	Matchroom League	Steve Davis (ENG)	RR	
Runner-up	8.	1991	Pot Black	Steve Davis (ENG)	1–2	
Runner-up	9.	1991	Thailand Masters	Steve Davis (ENG)	3–6	
Winner	16.	1991	Hong Kong Challenge	James Wattana (THA)	9–1	
Winner	17.	1991	Indian Challenge	John Parrott (ENG)	9–5	
Runner-up	10.	1991	Belgian Challenge	Steve Davis (ENG)	9–10	
Runner-up	11.	1991	London Masters	Steve Davis (ENG)	0–4	
Winner	18.	1992	The Masters (4)	John Parrott (ENG)	9–4	
Winner	19.	1992	European Challenge	Joe Johnson (ENG)	4–0	
Winner	20.	1992	Irish Masters	Ken Doherty (IRL)	9–6	
Winner	21.	1992	Matchroom League (2)	Steve Davis (ENG)	9–2	
Runner-up	12.	1992	Kent Classic	John Parrott (ENG)	5–6	
Winner	22.	1993	European Challenge (2)	Tony Drago (MLT)	5–3	
Winner	23.	1993	The Masters (5)	James Wattana (THA)	9–5	
Runner-up	13.	1994	The Masters	Alan McManus (SCO)	8–9	
Winner	24.	1994	European League (3)	John Parrott (ENG)	10–7	
Winner	25.	1994	Top Rank Classic	Alan McManus (SCO)	RR	
Runner-up	14.	1994	Scottish Masters	Ken Doherty (IRL)	7–9	
Winner	26.	1995	Charity Challenge	Dennis Taylor (NIR)	9–1	
Winner	27.	1995	European League (4)	Ken Doherty (IRL)	10–2	
Runner-up	15.	1995	Irish Masters (2)	Peter Ebdon (ENG)	8–9	
Winner	28.	1995	Scottish Masters (3)	Peter Ebdon (ENG)	9–5	
Winner	29.	1996	The Masters (6)	Ronnie O'Sullivan (ENG)	10–5	
Winner	30.	1997	Charity Challenge	Ronnie O'Sullivan (ENG)	9–8	
Winner	31.	1997	Irish Masters (2)	Darren Morgan (WAL)	9–8	
Runner-up	16.	1997	European League (3)	Ronnie O'Sullivan (ENG)	8–10	
Runner-up	17.	1998	The Masters (2)	Mark Williams (WAL)	9–10	
Runner-up	18.	1998	Red Bull Super Challenge	Steve Davis (ENG)	RR	
Winner	32.	1998	Champions Super League	John Higgins (SCO)	RR	
Winner	33.	1998	Malta Grand Prix	Ken Doherty (IRL)	7–6	
Winner	34.	1999	Irish Masters (3)	Stephen Lee (ENG)	9–8	
Winner	35.	1999	Champions Cup	Mark Williams (WAL)	7–5	
Winner	36.	2000	Premier League (5)	Mark Williams (WAL)	9–5	
Runner-up	19.	2000	Irish Masters (3)	John Higgins (SCO)	4–9	
Runner-up	20.	2000	Scottish Masters (2)	Ronnie O'Sullivan (ENG)	6–9	
Winner	37.	2001	Malta Grand Prix	Mark Williams (WAL)	7–1	
Runner-up	21.	2001	Irish Masters (4)	Ronnie O'Sullivan (ENG)	8–9	
Runner-up	22.	2001	Premier League (4)	Ronnie O'Sullivan (ENG)	7–9	
Runner-up	23.	2003	The Masters (3)	Mark Williams (WAL)	4–10	
Winner	38.	2004	Premier League (6)	John Higgins (SCO)	9–6	
Runner-up	24.	2005	Northern Ireland Trophy	Matthew Stevens (WAL)	7–9	
Runner-up	25.	2005 (Dec)	Premier League (5)	Ronnie O'Sullivan (ENG)	0–6	
Winner	39.	2009	Legends of Snooker	Ken Doherty (IRL)	5–3	

=== Seniors finals: 1 (1 title) ===
Seniors finals contested by Stephen Hendry
Outcome	No.	Year	Championship	Opponent in the final	Score	Ref.
Winner	1.	2023	World Seniors Snooker 900	Jimmy White (ENG)	1–0	

=== Team finals: 8 (5 titles) ===
Team finals contested by Stephen Hendry
Outcome	No.	Year	Championship	Team/partner	Opponent(s) in the final	Score	Ref.
Runner-up	1.	1986	World Doubles Championship	Mike Hallett (ENG)	Steve Davis (ENG); Tony Meo (ENG)	3–12	
Winner	1.	1987	World Doubles Championship	Mike Hallett (ENG)	Cliff Thorburn (CAN); Dennis Taylor (NIR)	12–8	
Winner	2.	1991	World Masters Men's Doubles	Mike Hallett (ENG)	Brady Gollan (CAN); Jim Wych (CAN)	8–5	
Runner-up	2.	1991	World Mixed Doubles Championship	Stacey Hillyard (ENG)	Steve Davis (ENG); Allison Fisher (ENG)	4–5	
Winner	3.	1996	World Cup	Scotland	Ireland	10–7	
Runner-up	3.	1999	Nations Cup	Scotland	Wales	4–6	
Winner	4.	2001	Nations Cup	Scotland	Ireland	6–2	
Winner	5.	2007	Euro-Asia Team Challenge	Team Europe	Team Asia	5–3	

=== Amateur finals: 6 (6 titles) ===
Amateur finals contested by Stephen Hendry
Outcome	No.	Year	Championship	Opponent in the final	Score	Ref.
Winner	1.	1982	Pontins Star of the Future	Paul Hefford (ENG)	2–0	
Winner	2.	1983	Scottish Under-16 Championship	unknown	unknown	
Winner	3.	1983	British Junior Championship	Nick Pearce (ENG)	3–0	
Winner	4.	1984	Scottish Amateur Championship	David Sneddon (SCO)	9–8	
Winner	5.	1984	Pontins Star of the Future (2)	Anthony Logan	3–1	
Winner	6.	1985	Scottish Amateur Championship (2)	Jim McNellan (SCO)	9–6	

== Awards ==
Awards received by Stephen Hendry
Award	Year	Ref.
Member of the Order of the British Empire (MBE)	1993	
BBC Scotland Sports Personality of the Year	1987, 1996	
WPBSA Young Player of the Year	1985, 1987, 1988	
WPBSA Player of the Year	1990, 1991, 1992, 1993, 1995, 1996, 1997, 1999	
WPBSA Performance of the Year (Note: Compiling seven century breaks in the 1995 World Snooker Championship final.)	1995	
World Snooker Hall of Fame	2011	
