= 1987 Scottish Professional Championship =

Scottish Professional Championship
Tournament information
- Dates: 3–8 February 1987
- Venue: Steve Davis Club
- City: Glasgow
- Country: Scotland
- Format: Non-ranking event
- Winner's share: £4,000
- Highest break: Stephen Hendry 119

Final
- Champion: Stephen Hendry
- Runner-up: Jim Donnelly
- Score: 10–7

The 1987 People's Cars Scottish Professional Championship was a professional non-ranking snooker tournament, which took place in February 1987 in Glasgow, Scotland.

Stephen Hendry retained the title by beating Jim Donnelly 10–7 in the final.

== Main draw ==
Quarter-finals; Best of 11 Frames
Stephen Hendry	6
Bert Demarco	2
John Rea	6
Ian Black	1
Jim Donnelly	6
Murdo MacLeod	2
Eddie Sinclair	6
Matt Gibson	2

Semi-finals; Best of 11 Frames
Stephen Hendry	6
John Rea	0
Jim Donnelly	6
Eddie Sinclair	4

Final; Best of 19 Frames
Stephen Hendry	10
Jim Donnelly	7
