= European Challenge =

Tournament information
- Location: Epernay
- Country: France
- Established: 1991
- Organisation(s): WPBSA
- Format: Non-ranking event
- Final year: 1993
- Final champion: (Scotland) Stephen Hendry

The European Challenge was a non-ranking snooker tournament staged between 1991 and 1993. In its first two years it was held in Waregem, Belgium and for its third year it was held in Epernay in France. All three editions were sponsored by Canal Plus.

== Winners ==
Year	Winner	Runner-up	Final score	Season
1991	(England) Jimmy White	(England) Steve Davis	4–1	1991/92
1992	(Scotland) Stephen Hendry	(England) Joe Johnson	4–0	1991/92
1993	(Scotland) Stephen Hendry	(Malta) Tony Drago	5–3	1992/93
