= 1997 Charity Challenge =

Tournament information
- Dates: 2–5 January 1997
- Venue: International Convention Centre
- City: Birmingham
- Country: England
- Organisation: WPBSA
- Format: Non-ranking event
- Winner's share: £30,000
- Highest break: (Scotland) Stephen Hendry (147)

Final
- Champion: (Scotland) Stephen Hendry
- Runner-up: (England) Ronnie O'Sullivan
- Score: 9–8

The 1997 Liverpool Victoria Charity Challenge was the third edition of the professional invitational snooker tournament, which took place in January 1997. The tournament was played at the International Convention Centre in Birmingham, England, and featured twelve professional players.

Stephen Hendry won the title, beating Ronnie O'Sullivan 9–8 in the final. Hendry had led 8–2, O'Sullivan won 6 frames in a row to level at 8–8, before Hendry made a 147 Maximum break in the deciding frame.

== Main draw ==
Round 1 Best of 9 Frames
(England) Nigel Bond	5
(Canada) Alain Robidoux	2
(Scotland) Alan McManus	5
(Wales) Darren Morgan	1
(England) John Parrott	5
(England) Jimmy White	2
(Republic of Ireland) Ken Doherty	5
(England) Steve Davis	4

Quarter-finals; Best of 9 Frames
(Scotland) Stephen Hendry	5
(England) Nigel Bond	3
(Scotland) John Higgins	4
(Scotland) Alan McManus	5
(England) Ronnie O'Sullivan	5
(England) John Parrott	4
(England) Peter Ebdon	5
(Republic of Ireland) Ken Doherty	2

Semi-finals; Best of 11 Frames
(Scotland) Stephen Hendry	6
(Scotland) Alan McManus	5
(England) Ronnie O'Sullivan	6
(England) Peter Ebdon	1

Final; Best of 17 Frames
(Scotland) Stephen Hendry	9
(England) Ronnie O'Sullivan	8

== Final ==
Final: Best of 17 frames. International Convention Centre, Birmingham, England, 5 January 1997.
Stephen Hendry; Scotland	9–8	Ronnie O'Sullivan; England
Afternoon: 110–25 (110), 59–31, 129–0 (129), 67–46, 10–107 (100), 129–9, 136–0 (136), 23–66; Evening: 82–1, 88–0, 20–106, 1–137 (137), 16–124 (124), 37–91, 9–87, 0–72, 147–0 (147)
147	Highest break	137
4	Century breaks	3
4	50+ breaks	3
