= 1995 Charity Challenge =

Tournament information
- Dates: 4–8 January 1995
- Venue: International Convention Centre
- City: Birmingham
- Country: England
- Organisation: WPBSA
- Format: Non-ranking event

Final
- Champion: (Scotland) Stephen Hendry
- Runner-up: (Northern Ireland) Dennis Taylor
- Score: 9–1

The 1995 Liverpool Victoria Charity Challenge was the inaugural edition of the professional invitational snooker tournament, which took place in January 1995. The tournament was played at the International Convention Centre in Birmingham, England, and featured sixteen professional players.

Stephen Hendry won the title, beating Dennis Taylor 9–1 in the final.

== Main draw ==
Round 1 Best of 9 Frames
(Scotland) Stephen Hendry | 5
(Northern Ireland) Joe Swail | 2
(England) Ronnie O'Sullivan | 5
(England) David Roe | 4
(Scotland) Alan McManus | 5
(England) Nigel Bond | 3
(England) John Parrott | 5
(England) Peter Ebdon | 2
(Northern Ireland) Dennis Taylor | 5
(England) Jimmy White | 4
(England) Willie Thorne | 5
(Wales) Darren Morgan | 0
(Wales) Terry Griffiths | 5
(Republic of Ireland) Ken Doherty | 1
(England) Steve Davis | 5
(Malta) Tony Drago | 1

Quarter-finals; Best of 9 Frames
(Scotland) Stephen Hendry | 5
(England) Ronnie O'Sullivan | 3
(Scotland) Alan McManus | 5
(England) John Parrott | 1
(Northern Ireland) Dennis Taylor | 5
(England) Willie Thorne | 1
(Wales) Terry Griffiths | 5
(England) Steve Davis | 2

Semi-finals; Best of 11 Frames
(Scotland) Stephen Hendry | 6
(Scotland) Alan McManus | 5
(Northern Ireland) Dennis Taylor | 6
(Wales) Terry Griffiths | 3

Final; Best of 17 Frames
(Scotland) Stephen Hendry | 9
(Northern Ireland) Dennis Taylor | 1
