= Sascha Diemer =

German snooker player (born 1976)

Sascha Diemer (born 25 February 1976) is a German amateur snooker player and three-time German Snooker Champion. He competed in both national and international amateur events during the 1990s and 2000s.

== Career ==
Diemer began competing in the early 1990s, coached by Mike Henson. He achieved notable success on the German amateur circuit, winning his first national title in 1994 and adding two more in 1997 and 2001. Internationally, he participated in the 1999 European Championship, reaching the group stage.

Diemer was also active in team competitions, winning the German Team Championship in 1994 and competing in the 1st Bundesliga Snooker league.

== Achievements ==
- 3× German Champion (Singles: 1994, 1997, 2001)
- Last 16 – WPBSA Minor Tour
- Winner – German Team Championship (1994)
