= Hotel Café Royal =

Hotel in London, former restaurant

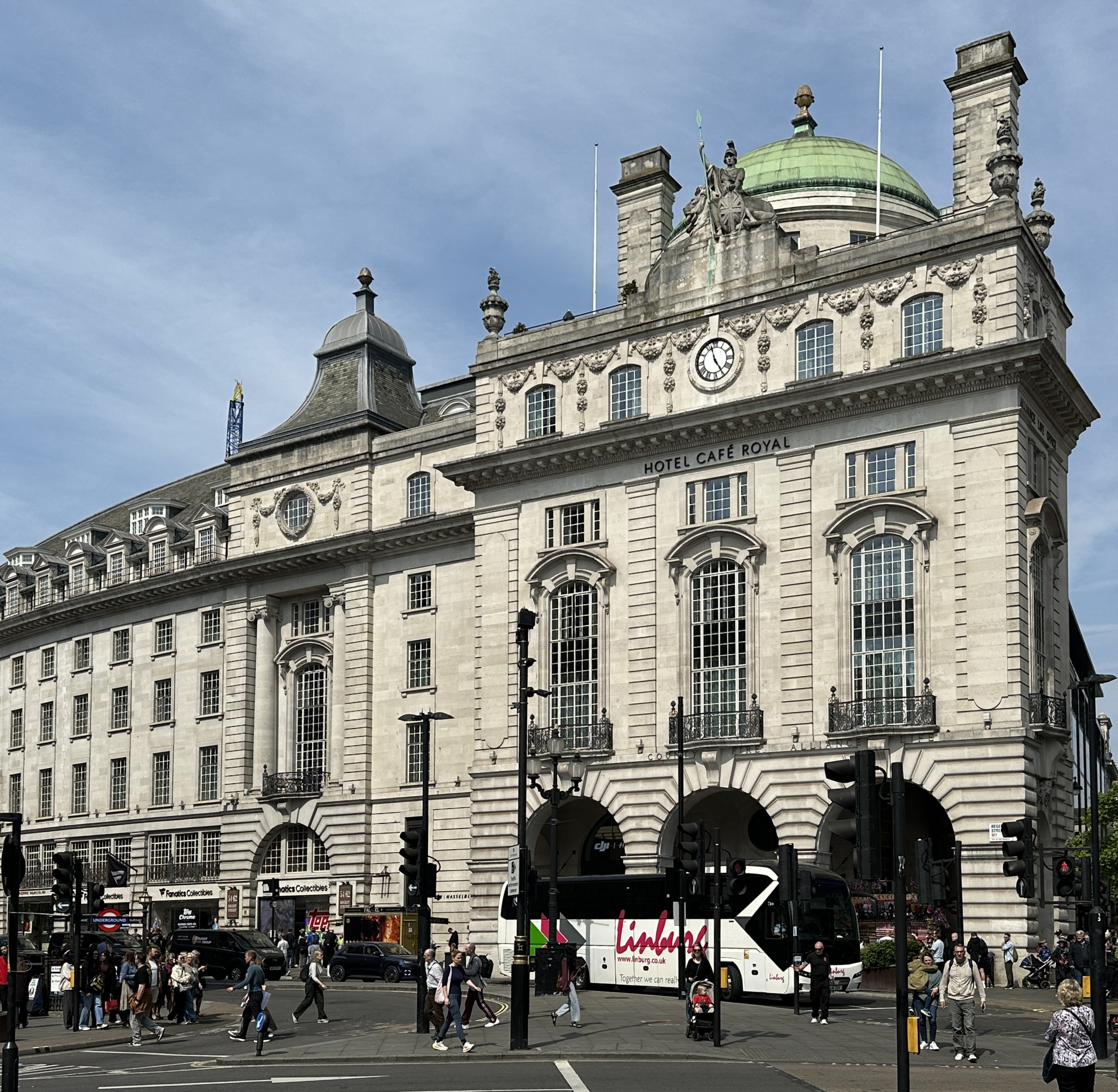
- Hotel Café Royal in 2026

- Location within Central London

General information
- Location: 68 Regent Street; London, W1
- Coordinates: 51°30′36″N 0°8′9″W
- Completed: 1865; 161 years ago
- Owner: The Set Collection

Website
- hotelcaferoyal.com

The Hotel Café Royal is a five-star hotel at 68 Regent Street in Piccadilly, London. Before its conversion in 2008–2012, it was a restaurant and meeting place known as the Café Royal.

== History ==
The establishment was originally conceived and set up in 1865 by Daniel Nicholas Thévenon, who was a French wine merchant. He had to flee France due to bankruptcy, arriving in Britain in 1863 with his wife, Célestine, and just five pounds in cash. He changed his name to Daniel Nicols and under his management—and later that of his wife—the Café Royal flourished and was considered at one point to have the greatest wine cellar in the world.

By the 1890s, the Café Royal had become the place to see and be seen at. Its patrons have included Oscar Wilde, Aleister Crowley, Virginia Woolf, D. H. Lawrence, Winston Churchill, Noël Coward, Brigitte Bardot, J. Paul Getty, Mary Teissier, Max Beerbohm, George Bernard Shaw, Jacob Epstein, Mick Jagger, Elizabeth Taylor, Muhammad Ali and Diana, Princess of Wales. The café was the scene of a famous meeting on 24 March 1895, when Frank Harris advised Oscar Wilde to drop his charge of criminal libel against the Marquess of Queensberry, father of Alfred Douglas. Wilde refused the advice, Queensberry was acquitted, and Wilde was subsequently tried, convicted and imprisoned. From 1951, the Café Royal was the home of the National Sporting Club. It was bought by David Locke in 1972. The Café Royal closed in 2008.

Prominent personalities continued to host important events through the early 21st century at the establishment. Kanye West played 20 new songs in 2014 when he DJ'ed at a private party with Frank Ocean at the Café Royal. At a private after-party for the British Fashion Awards, hosted by Kate Moss and Naomi Campbell at Café Royal, guests in attendance included Harry Styles, Cara Delevingne and Rihanna.

== Restoration and conversion ==
The Crown Estate, which owns most of Regent Street on behalf of the monarch including number 68, sold a 125-year lease to the Israeli-based Alrov Group (which operates the luxury hotel brand 'The Set Collection'). The 90 million pound deal was part of a major Regent Street regeneration project.

Café Royal closed in December 2008. The fittings and furniture were later sold at auction. The building is a grade II listed building, which protected its architecturally significant features and fixtures.

David Chipperfield Architects, with Donald Insall Associates, restored and transformed the building into a hotel with 159 rooms and historic suites, an array of dining rooms and bars, a private members club, meeting rooms, ballroom and a wellbeing spa and gym with 18-metre pool. The Grill Room provides a traditional afternoon tea service. The restoration and conversion work took a year longer than expected due to a major flood and the complexity of the restoration. It was completed in October 2012, at a cost of £200 million.

== Gallery ==
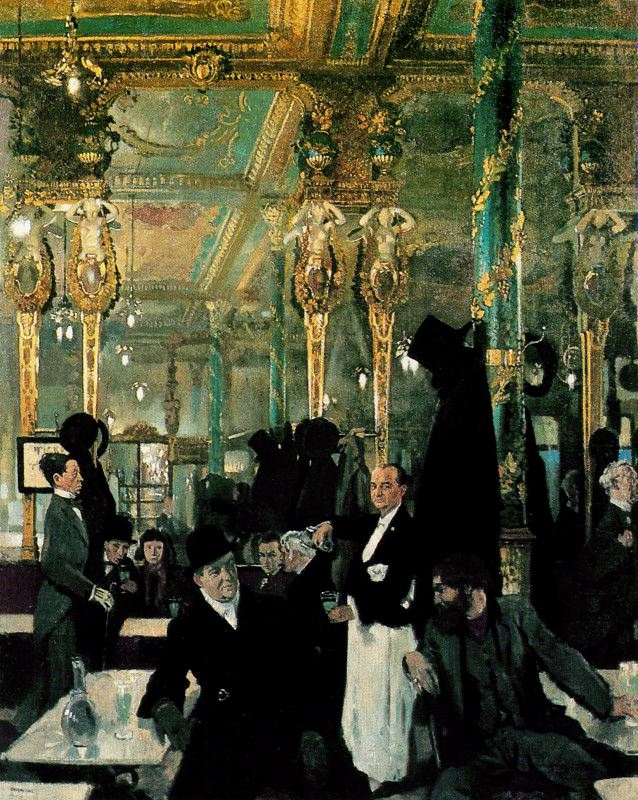
The Café Royal, London by William Orpen, 1912

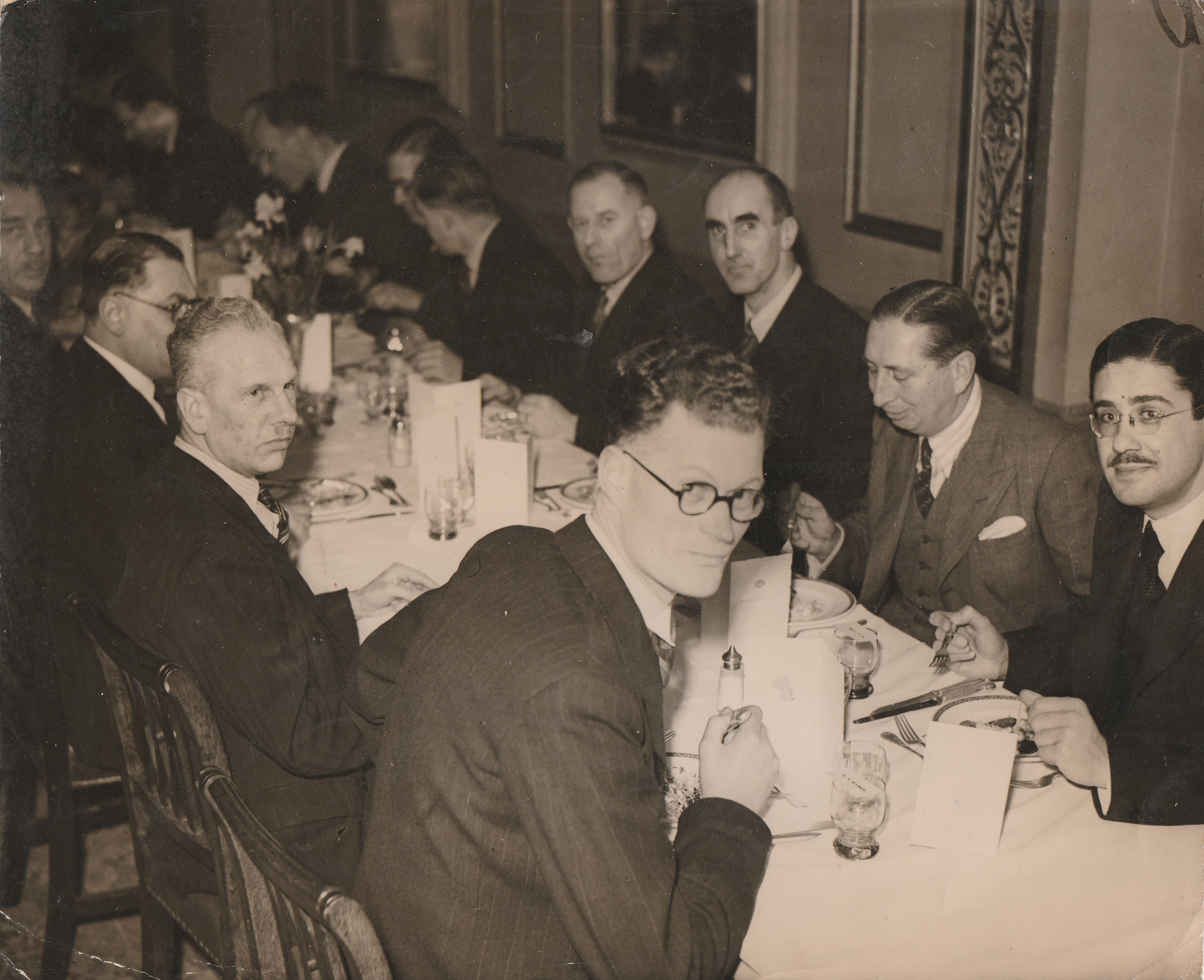
Conference at the Café Royal restaurant in 1947

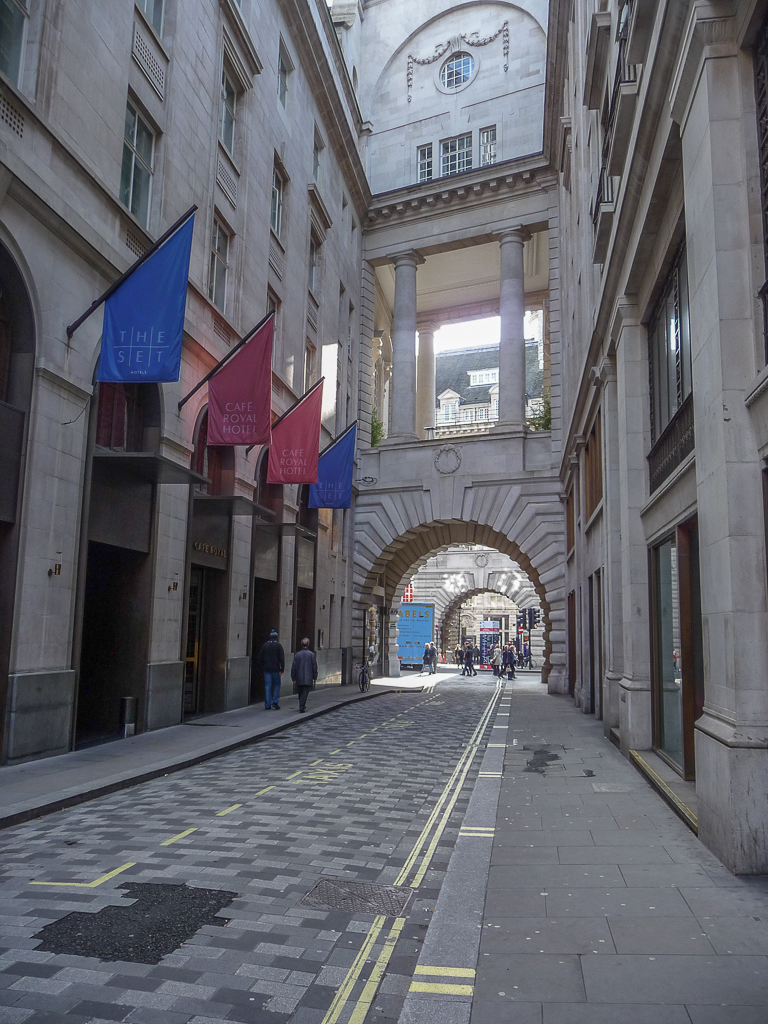
Café Royal

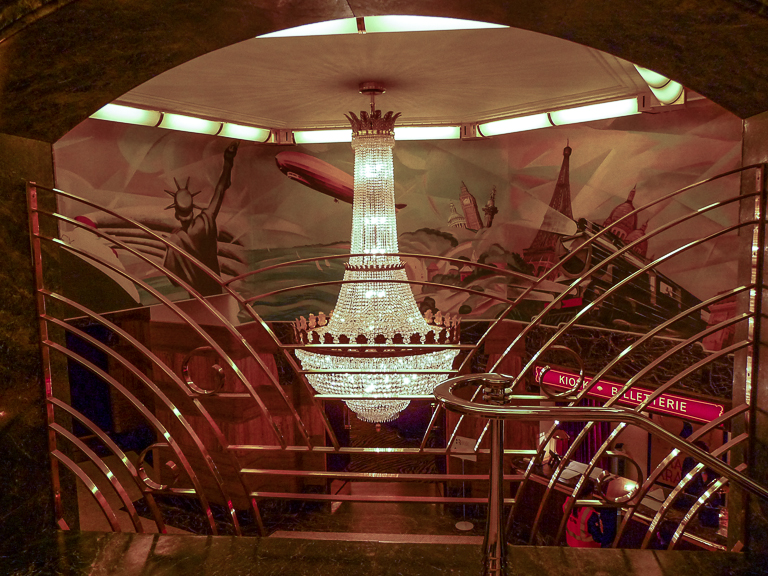
