= Oldham Civic Centre =

Municipal building in Oldham, Greater Manchester, England

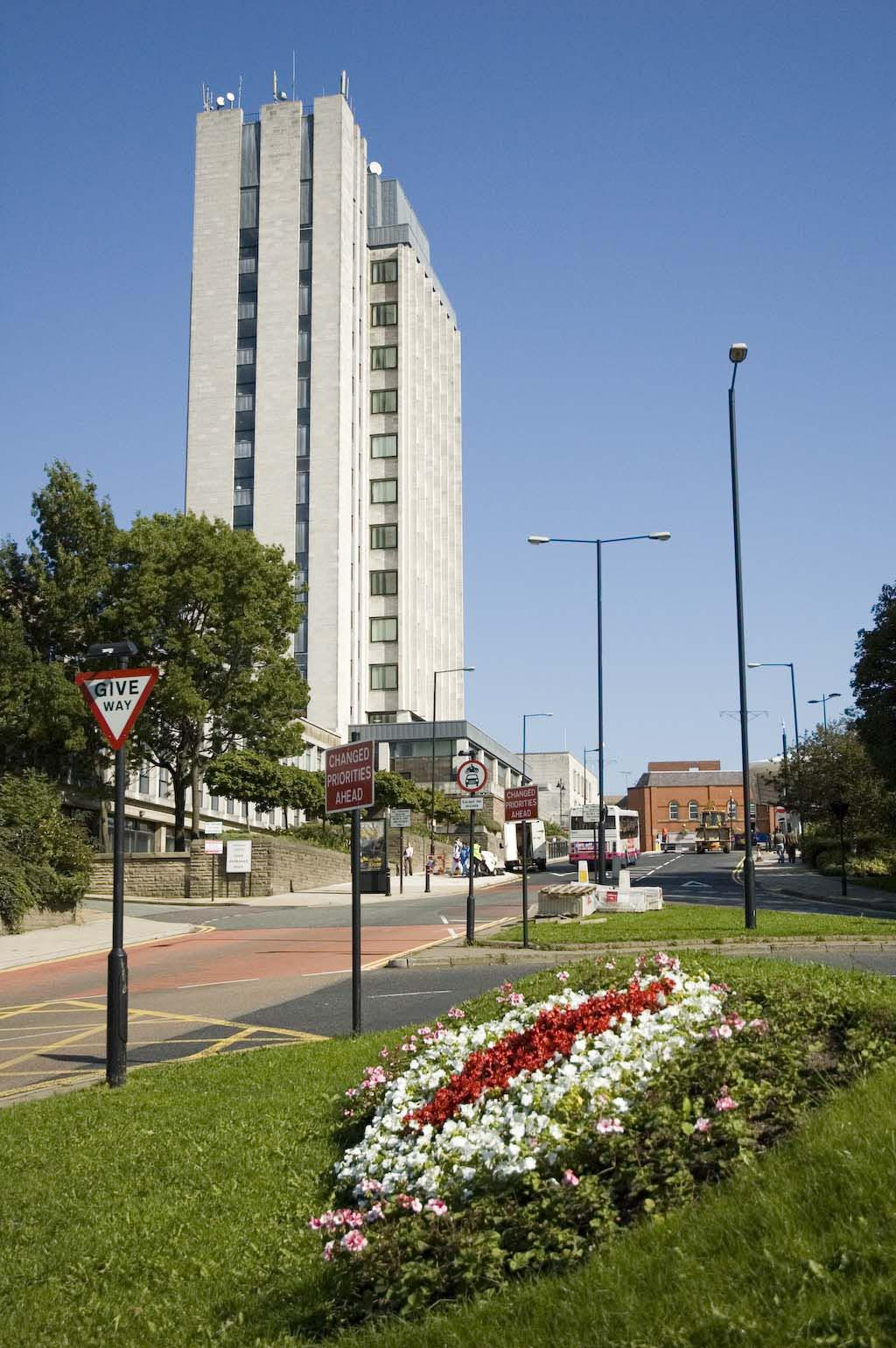
- Oldham Civic Centre

- Shown in Greater Manchester
- 53.5424°N 2.1165°W
- Location: West Street, Oldham

History
- Built: 1977

Site notes
- Architect(s): Cecil Howitt & Partners

Oldham Civic Centre is a municipal building in West Street, Oldham, England.

== History ==
The low-level western section of the Civic Centre was originally built as offices for the housing and social services departments as well as the Regional Health Authority and was completed in 1962. The facility was extended to include a 15-storey tower, designed by Cecil Howitt & Partners and built by Henry Boot so enabling the council to move out of the ageing Oldham Town Hall into the enlarged complex. The enlarged complex, which incorporated an event and conference venue known as the "Queen Elizabeth Hall" intended to commemorate the Queen's Silver Jubilee in 1977, was officially opened by Queen Elizabeth The Queen Mother on 1 March 1977.

The facility had its own Cold War nuclear bunker built to protect senior councillors, council officers, police officers, engineers, doctors and communications experts in the event of a nuclear attack. The tower in the facility, which now forms the headquarters of the Metropolitan Borough of Oldham, is 175 feet (53 metres) high. The only other structure of comparable height and scale is the Church of St Mary with St Peter at the opposite (i.e. east) end of the town centre.

In January 1982 Steve Davis became the first snooker player to achieve a televised maximum break in a match against John Spencer in the Lada Classic at the Civic Centre.

The Victoria Cross awarded during the First World War to Sergeant John Hogan, who was born in Royton, currently displayed in the Civic Centre, was presented to Oldham Council in October 1983.
