= WSC Real 08: World Snooker Championship =

2008 video game

- Developer: Blade Interactive
- Publishers: Blade Interactive, Koch Media
- Series: World Snooker Championship
- Platforms: Wii, Microsoft Windows, PlayStation 3, Xbox 360
- Release: Wii: EU: 14 November 2008; WSC Real 09: World Snooker Championship; Microsoft Windows, PlayStation 3, Xbox 360: EU: 3 April 2009; Wii: EU: 28 August 2009
- Genre: Sports
- Modes: Single-player, multiplayer

WSC Real 08: World Snooker Championship is a sports video game developed and published by Blade Interactive exclusively for Wii. It was later released for Microsoft Windows, PlayStation 3 and Xbox 360, under the name WSC Real 09: World Snooker Championship.

== Gameplay ==
The game includes new elements, which makes the game seem more realistic. Players will be able to switch into a first-person view, allowing them to walk around the table and examine any ball they wish, they can carefully watch their opponents' body language to see how they respond as the game progresses. The game includes all the tournaments and official licenses for the season.

The original Wii release was shipped with a cue attachment, which allowed the player to control the game with the Wiimote acting as a cue to play shots in game.

== Features ==
=== Players ===
- Mark Allen
- Jamie Cope
- Joe Perry
- Joe Swail
- John Higgins
- Graeme Dott
- Shaun Murphy
- Ken Doherty
- Ronnie O'Sullivan
- Peter Ebdon
- Neil Robertson
- Stephen Hendry
- Ding Junhui
- Stephen Maguire
- Mark Selby
- Mark Williams

and others..

=== Tournaments ===
- Shanghai Masters
- Pot Black
- Grand Prix
- Northern Ireland Trophy
- UK Snooker Championship
- Masters
- China Open
- Welsh Open
- World Snooker Championship

=== Commentators ===
- John Virgo
- Steve Davis
- John Parrott

== Reception ==
Official Nintendo Magazine UK gave the Wii version 89/100, saying "You won't find many better sports games on the Wii." However, The WSC Real 09 version of the game, the later release on the Xbox 360, PS3 and PC formats, did not fare quite so well, achieving an average of 70% at GameRankings.

In a review of the Xbox version, Computer and Video Games praised its realistic ball physics and challenging AI, and called it the "most authentic snooker game to date". However, the reviewer criticized its loading times, underwhelming presentation, and minor camera issues.
