= World Snooker Championship 2007 (video game) =

2007 video game

- PAL Xbox 360 box art
- Developer(s): Blade Interactive
- Publisher(s): Sega
- Series: World Snooker Championship
- Platform(s): PlayStation 2, PlayStation Portable, Xbox 360, PlayStation 3
- Release: PlayStation 2, PlayStation Portable, Xbox 360: EU: 12 January 2007; AU: 15 February 2007; PlayStation 3: PAL: 23 March 2007
- Genre(s): Sports
- Mode(s): Single-player, multiplayer

World Snooker Championship 2007 is a sports video game developed by Blade Interactive and published by Sega for PlayStation 2, PlayStation Portable, Xbox 360 and PlayStation 3.

== Development ==
The game was announced at E3 in 2006, by Sega along with other games, including Sonic Rivals and Virtua Tennis 3. The game would be announced at this time as being a PlayStation exclusive for PlayStation 2 and PlayStation Portable, and also under the release name for North America, "World Pool Championship 2007", to be released in September 2006.

However, the game was later delayed for a PlayStation 3 and Xbox 360 versions to be created. As the game of Snooker is largely not played in the Americas, the game was released featuring Pool, instead of Snooker in the game's title. However, the game had no features cut from the game's American release.

== Gameplay ==
A silhouette displays the predicted cueball finishing position.

Players can create their own character and compete against or play as professional snooker players such as: Shaun Murphy, Ronnie O'Sullivan, and John Higgins. For the first time in the series, professional Pool players are included, with players like Efren Reyes and Earl Strickland available to play against in the Pool modes.

Game modes include snooker, 8-ball, 9-ball and the returning John Virgo's trick shot. This latest edition includes improvements on the visual aids the player can turn on. The player is now able to see where the cue ball will end up after his shot, with a bigger circle of where the ball will end up being decided by how difficult the previous shot was.

The game boasted 104 top snooker players and ten official tournaments, all modeled for the 2007 season. In-game commentary is provided by John Parrott, John Virgo and Steve Davis. The game also features a brand new "Golden Cue" mode, where games can be made up of frames from different sports, such as a frame of Snooker, followed by a frame of Nine ball pool.

== Reception ==
Reception

Aggregate score
Aggregator	Score
GameRankings	(PS2) 75% (PS3) 67% (PSP) 75% (X360) 70%

Review scores
Publication	Score
Eurogamer	6/10
IGN	7.2/10
VideoGamer.com	8/10

World Snooker Championship 2007 received "mixed or average" and "generally positive" reviews, according to review aggregator GameRankings. Many of the game's reviewers commented that the game did not have "next generation" graphics, with Tom Orry from VideoGamer.com commenting that the game looked "pig ugly." IGN commented that the game may have been influenced by its PlayStation Portable release, and caused graphics for the console release to be less impressive to make porting easier.

Rob Burman of IGN also published a review of the game, for both Xbox and PS3, but stated the Xbox 360 version was superior, stating "Compared to the Xbox 360 game, this PS3 iteration has borne the brunt of the ugly stick." before scoring the game with a 7.2/10. Keza MacDonald of Eurogamer reviewed the game, but scored the game at 6/10. MacDonald stated that the game was similar to existing titles, and that there were only marginal upgrades to the previous games in the series calling it "hardly an advancement over its predecessors". MacDonald also commented "...it's snooker (and pool, and billiards) by numbers, with none of the realistic-looking players or visual authenticity or visible effort of its golf, table tennis or basketball compatriots on the Xbox 360."

World Snooker Championship 2007 reached a series high 6th in the UK game charts, on 20 January 2007. The game's success co-incidence with the Masters competition that year, won by Ronnie O'Sullivan. The game would last two weeks in the top 10, before leaving the charts in February 2007.
