= WSC Real 11: World Snooker Championship =

2011 video game

- Developer(s): Dark Energy Digital
- Publisher(s): Koch Media
- Series: World Snooker Championship
- Platform(s): PlayStation 3, Xbox 360
- Release: EU: 15 April 2011
- Genre(s): Sports
- Mode(s): Single-player, multiplayer

WSC Real 11: World Snooker Championship is a sports video game developed by Dark Energy Digital and published by Koch Media for PlayStation 3 and Xbox 360.

== Gameplay ==
Playing as Neil Robertson, playing a safety

Many features from previous games remain, with the traditional career mode allowing players to play as a rookie, and win matches on the official Snooker or Pool tours to improve their world ranking, and qualify for more prestigious tournaments, such as the Masters, the UK Championship, or the World Snooker Championship. New to 2011, a rewind game assist, allowing certain shots (once missed), to be replayed.

The player character's appearance can be modified and altered, and experience points from the main game can be used to update the player's character look and skills. The player can play both the official snooker tour and an amalgamated eight-ball pool season simultaneously.

== Reception ==
Reception

Aggregate score
| Aggregator | Score |
|---|---|
| GameRankings | (PS3) 63% (X360) 65% |

Review scores
| Publication | Score |
|---|---|
| GameSpot | 7.5/10 |
| VideoGamer.com | 6/10 |

WSC Real 11: World Snooker Championship received "mixed or average" reviews, according to review aggregator GameRankings.

GameSpot reviewed both of these versions, scoring the game at 7.5/10, calling it an "enjoyable experience, with realistic cue and ball physics and a wide selection of features and game modes." They also cited the game's new rewind system, and the game's improved graphics over past iterations.

Tom Orry from Video Gamer magazine scored the game at 6/10, saying "I'm a big snooker fan so I could play WSC Real 11 for hours, putting up with its problems, but that doesn't mean it's a good virtual version of the sport." Orry commented on the game's difficulty, stating that the game's assists either made the game "far too easy or far too difficult", before commenting that "WSC Real 11 is passable, but it's a long way from being an easy recommendation."
