= 1982 Pontins Professional =

Tournament information
- Dates: 22–28 May 1982
- Venue: Pontin's
- City: Prestatyn
- Country: Wales
- Organisation: WPBSA
- Format: Non-Ranking event
- Total prize fund: £10,500
- Winner's share: £3,500

Final
- Champion: (England) Steve Davis
- Runner-up: (Wales) Ray Reardon
- Score: 9–4

The 1982 Pontins Professional was the ninth edition of the professional invitational snooker tournament which took place between 22 and 28 May 1982 at Pontin's in Prestatyn, Wales.

The tournament featured eight professional players. The quarter-final matches were contested over the best of 11 frames, the semi-final matches over the best of 13 frames, and the final over the best of 17 frames. Reigning world snooker champion Alex Higgins lost 0–6 to Ray Reardon in the quarter-finals. Reardon made breaks of 66, 59, 54, 50, 79, 36, and 68 on his way to whitewashing Higgins.

Steve Davis won the event, beating Ray Reardon 9–4 in the final. Davis took a 4–0 lead with breaks of 53, 68, 40 and 58. Reardon won the next two frames, compiling breaks of 64 and 44 in the fifth frame, and 51 in the sixth frame. Davis extended his lead to 5–2, and then Reardon won the next two frames, reducing Davis' lead to one frame at 5–4. Davis then took the next four frames, making breaks of 45, 46, 55 and 69, to win the match.

Davis received £3,500 prize money as winner, with Reardon receiving £2,000 as runner-up. Losing semi-finalists were paid £1,000, and losing quarter-finalists received £750.

== Main draw ==
Quarter-finals; Best of 11 frames
(England) Steve Davis	6
(England) Willie Thorne	2
(Wales) Doug Mountjoy	6
(Northern Ireland) Dennis Taylor	2
(Wales) Ray Reardon	6
(Northern Ireland) Alex Higgins	0
(Wales) Terry Griffiths	6
(England) John Virgo	3

Semi-finals; Best of 13 frames
(England) Steve Davis	7
(Wales) Doug Mountjoy	3
(Wales) Ray Reardon	7
(Wales) Terry Griffiths	0

Final; Best of 17 frames
(England) Steve Davis	9
(Wales) Ray Reardon	4
