= 1983 Pot Black =

Pot Black 83
Tournament information
- Dates: 28-30 December 1982 (Broadcast 10 January – 11 April 1983)
- Venue: Pebble Mill Studios
- City: Birmingham
- Country: England
- Format: Non-Ranking event
- Winner's share: £2500
- Highest break: (Wales) Ray Reardon (91)

Final
- Champion: (England) Steve Davis
- Runner-up: (Wales) Ray Reardon
- Score: 2–0

The 1983 Pot Black was a professional invitational snooker tournament, which was held in the Pebble Mill Studios in Birmingham. 8 players were competing in 2 four player groups. The matches are one-frame shoot-outs in the group stages, 2 frame aggregate scores in the semi-finals and the best of 3 frames in the final.

Broadcasts were on BBC2 and started at 21:00 on Monday 10 January 1983 Alan Weeks presented the programme with Ted Lowe as commentator and John Williams as referee.

First time in Pot Black this year are Tony Knowles who failed to make the semi-finals and Jimmy White who managed it before losing to Steve Davis. Davis went on to win the title beating twice champion Ray Reardon 2–0 to win his second title and the fourth man to retain it.

== Main draw ==
=== Group 1 ===
Player 1	Score	Player 2	Broadcast Date
(England) Steve Davis	1–0	(Wales) Ray Reardon	10 January 1983
(Canada) Kirk Stevens	0–1	(England) Willie Thorne	17 January 1983
(England) Steve Davis	0–1	(Canada) Kirk Stevens	24 January 1983
(Wales) Ray Reardon	70–54	(England) Willie Thorne	14 February 1983
(England) Steve Davis	1–0	(England) Willie Thorne	28 February 1983
(Wales) Ray Reardon	105–9	(Canada) Kirk Stevens	14 March 1983

=== Group 2 ===
Player 1	Score	Player 2	Broadcast Date
(Northern Ireland) Alex Higgins	0–1	(England) Tony Knowles	14 January 1983
(Australia) Eddie Charlton	1–0	(England) Jimmy White	21 January 1983
(Australia) Eddie Charlton	1–0	(Northern Ireland) Alex Higgins	7 February 1983
(England) Tony Knowles	50–62	(England) Jimmy White	21 February 1983
(Northern Ireland) Alex Higgins	8–120	(England) Jimmy White	7 March 1983
(England) Tony Knowles	57-75	(Australia) Eddie Charlton	21 March 1983

=== Knockout stage ===
Semi-finals 28 March and 4 April 1983)
(England) Steve Davis	168
(England) Jimmy White	58
(Wales) Ray Reardon	1
(Australia) Eddie Charlton	0

Final (11 April 1983)
(England) Steve Davis	2
(Wales) Ray Reardon	0

Semi-Final frame scores:

Davis v White (118-13), (50-45)

== Final ==
Final: Best of 3 frames. Referee: John Williams. Pebble Mill Studios, Birmingham, England, 30 December 1982 (Broadcast 11 April 1983).
Steve Davis; England	2–0	Ray Reardon; Wales
61–60 (Reardon 60), 82–47 (50)
50	Highest break	60
0	Century breaks	0
1	50+ breaks	1
