= World Snooker Championship: Season 2007–08 =

2007 video game

World Snooker Championship: Season 2007-08
- Developer(s): Blade Interactive
- Publisher(s): Deep Silver
- Series: World Snooker Championship
- Platform(s): Nintendo DS
- Release: EU: 26 October 2007
- Genre(s): Sports
- Mode(s): Single-player, multiplayer

World Snooker Championship: Season 2007-08 is a sports video game developed by Blade Interactive and published by Deep Silver exclusively for Nintendo DS.

== Overview ==
Unlike other releases in the series, this title was released for the Nintendo DS, and would add the moniker of "Season" to the games' title. The game used the DS's dual-screen and stylus to control the game; although traditional D-pad controls are still available in game. The game featured single-player and two-player game modes in both Snooker, and Pool, however, unlike the console versions, there was no network play modes available.

The game features similar controls to the other games in the series, also featuring commentary by John Virgo. The game features a Championship, Challenge mode, Quick Play, and friendly mode.

== Reception ==
Reception

Aggregate score
Aggregator	Score
GameRankings	55%

Review scores
Publication	Score
Eurogamer	6/10
VideoGamer.com	5/10
Honest Gamers	4/10
DarkZero.co.uk	4/10
Pocket Gamer	6/10

World Snooker Championship: Season 2007-08 received "mixed or average" and "generally positive" reviews, according to review aggregator GameRankings. Handheld gaming reviewer Pocket Gamer scored the game at 6/10, saying that they enjoyed the stylus control scheme of the game, and that on the "whole the control system works well" However, they were also hesitant about the game's gameplay, saying "movement around the table is disappointingly jerky" Eurogamer were also positive regarding the game's design, saying "Its (Sic) debut on DS plays pretty much as a snooker game should," but later said that "it [was] difficult to be precise without a lot of faff"

Video Game Review website Hexus.net reviewed the game, but were confused by the game's difficulty, wrapping up their review saying "A decent snooker sim for when you’re on the move, but expect a serious challenge," and called it "too difficult". VideoGamer.com agreed that the game's AI was too difficult, calling it "unreasonable".

One of the biggest issues from critics was the lack of a network mode, that players had to "swap the DS back and forth" if playing a multiplayer game. EuroGamer humorously stating the game had "missed a trick(shot)" by not including the function. Pocket Gamer were bemused with the decision to leave out this game mode stating "It surely couldn't have been too hard to include a wireless multiplayer option or even online matches? It's a real missed opportunity." videogamer.com were also scathing about the omission "The lack of wireless multiplayer is a real killer and an oversight that is quite unforgivable for a sports title."
