= World Snooker Championship (series) =

World Snooker Championship Series
- Genre(s): Sports, Simulation
- Developer(s): Blade Interactive; Dark Energy Digital
- Publisher(s): Codemasters; Sold Out Sales & Marketing; Sega Europe; Deep Silver
- Platform(s): PC, Mac, PlayStation, PlayStation 2, Xbox, Xbox 360, Wii, Nintendo DS, PSP

The World Snooker Championship (WSC) is a series of video games based on snooker featuring licensing from the World Professional Billiards and Snooker Association. The first game in the series was released in 2001 and the last in 2011; a new licensed World Snooker game, Snooker 19, was released in 2019. The first four games were published by Codemasters and developed by Blade Interactive Software. Later games were published by Sega, Deep Silver and Koch Media.

== Overview ==
The first game was simply named "World Championship Snooker" and released in 2000. In 2004, following a change in publisher, the series was renamed World Snooker Championship to better reflect the name of the tournament body and the actual tournament.

In 2005 the box art features the snooker player Paul Hunter who died in 2006 from cancer. When the game was re-released as a budget title from Sold-Out Software, he remained on the cover and in-game, but a memorial notice is included on the back of the case ("Paul Hunter 1978 - 2006").

The 2007 version is the first to feature fully licensed pool tournaments. In previous versions, pool is a side mode that can only be played in matches against the computer or other players.

From 2008 onwards, the series was renamed WSC Real: World Snooker Championship. The branding was changed to reflect more realistic gameplay, including the ability to play in first person and view shots from any angle, and characters' lifelike emotions.

== Titles ==
Aggregate review scores
Game	GameRankings
World Championship Snooker	(PC) 68%
World Championship Snooker 2002	(PS2) 72%
World Championship Snooker 2003	(PC) 78% (PS2) 73% (Xbox) 84%
World Championship Snooker 2004	(PC) 65% (PS2) 80% (Xbox) 82%
World Snooker Championship 2005	(PC) 64% (PS2) 67% (PSP) 75% (Xbox) 74%
World Snooker Championship 2007	(PS2) 75% (PS3) 67% (PSP) 75% (X360) 70%
World Snooker Championship: Season 2007-08	(NDS) 55%
WSC Real 08: World Snooker Championship	(PC) 50% (PS3) 61% (Wii) 89% (X360) 69%
WSC Real 11: World Snooker Championship	(PS3) 63% (X360) 65%

=== World Championship Snooker ===
The first game was released in 2000 for PlayStation and later in 2001 for Microsoft Windows. The box art features Stephen Hendry, Ronnie O'Sullivan and Mark Williams.

=== World Championship Snooker 2002 ===
World Championship Snooker 2002 was released on 28 September 2001 exclusively for PlayStation 2. The second game's box art also features Williams, Hendry and Sullivan. Gameplay on WCS 2002 improves from the previous version, and "player aids", such as a cueball line, shows the direction of the shot being played.

=== World Championship Snooker 2003 ===
World Championship Snooker 2003 was released on PlayStation 2, Xbox, and Microsoft Windows. The box art features world champions Peter Ebdon, Stephen Hendry, Ronnie O'Sullivan, John Higgins, Ken Doherty and Mark Williams. The game is the first in the series to feature pool modes, with both eight-ball and nine-ball pool included.

The game includes Big Break presenter John Virgo and a version of the "John Virgo's Trick Shot" mode in-game.

=== World Championship Snooker 2004 ===
World Championship Snooker 2004 was released on Microsoft Windows, PlayStation 2 and Xbox. The box art features Stephen Hendry, Mark Williams, Steve Davis and Ronnie O'Sullivan. The 2004 edition features an expanded roster, including almost every member of the World Snooker Tour (except Jimmy White, likely due to him having his own licensed series of games), and licenses for official arenas such as the Crucible Theatre.

The game also introduced online multiplayer to the series, with players able to play single matches and tournaments. The game is the last in the series published by Codemasters.

=== World Snooker Championship 2005 ===
World Snooker Championship 2005 is the first licensed World Snooker Championship video game. The box art features Paul Hunter, Ronnie O'Sullivan and Steve Davis. This is the first game in the series with the name "World Snooker Championship". The game was published by Sega instead of Codemasters.

The game is also the first released on a handheld console, as the World Snooker Challenge 2005 on the PlayStation Portable. The game features a playable "League of Champions" mode, where famous past snooker matches can be replayed. The game includes additional modes such as bar billiards. In "free play" mode, variables such as table size can be altered.

=== World Snooker Championship 2007 ===
World Snooker Championship 2007 was released on 12 January 2007. The box art features John Higgins, Ronnie O'Sullivan and Shaun Murphy. This is the first game in the series to be released on the seventh generation of consoles, with PlayStation 3 and Xbox 360 releases. This installment also added a new mode called "Golden Cue," where custom matches can be played.

A new assist that would appear in all WSC games from this point on shows a provisional finishing position for the cue ball as a circular silhouette. This circle expands or retracts depending on the player's skill and difficulty of the shot involved.

=== World Snooker Championship: Season 2007-08 ===
World Snooker Championship: Season 2007-08 was released exclusively on Nintendo DS on 26 October 2007. The game's box art features Mark Selby and John Higgins. The game is the only release in the series for a Nintendo handheld console. The edition was panned for its lack of online play.

=== WSC Real 08: World Snooker Championship ===
WSC Real 08: World Snooker Championship was released on 14 November 2008 for the Wii. The box art features Ronnie O'Sullivan and Steve Davis. The game is controlled with the Wii Remote, and was shipped with a cue attachment. The game was released on other consoles as WSC Real 09: World Snooker Championship. It was later released simultaneously for Microsoft Windows, PlayStation 3 and Xbox 360 on 3 April 2009. The version is identical apart from the addition of some graphical improvements.

=== WSC Real 11: World Snooker Championship ===
WSC Real 11: World Snooker Championship was released on 15 April 2011 for PlayStation 3 and Xbox 360. The box art features Ronnie O'Sullivan. A gameplay function introduced in this edition is the ability to retake shots a certain number of times per game. The 2011 edition features improvements to the character creation system.
