= World Championship Snooker 2004 (video game) =

2004 video game

- Developer(s): Blade Interactive
- Publisher(s): Codemasters
- Series: World Snooker Championship
- Platform(s): PlayStation 2, Windows, Xbox
- Release: EU: 25 June 2004; AU: 2 July 2004 (Xbox); AU: 9 July 2004 (PC, PS2)
- Genre(s): Sports
- Mode(s): Single-player, multiplayer

World Championship Snooker 2004 is a sports video game developed by Blade Interactive and published by Codemasters for Windows, PlayStation 2, and Xbox.

== Overview ==
Whereas earlier titles in the series only featured major player likenesses, the game features over 128 players from the World Snooker Tour, as well as a greater number of official tournaments. Along with the regular world championships, the 2004 version features the LG Open, UK, and Masters competitions. The game also includes arena licenses, such as that of the Crucible Theatre.

== Gameplay ==
Mark Williams playing a long pot

The game features Career, Quick Play and Trickshot modes. The game also includes eight-ball, nine-ball, and blackball pool. For a series first, the game also allows players to play Snooker online, via a modem. There is also the option to create your own custom tournaments for play against the AI, or another player. In Career mode, the player starts as a new member of the World Snooker Tour, and earns ranking points by winning matches and tournaments. Similar to real life, certain competitions are only available at a certain ranking (such as The Masters), and at lower rankings the player has to qualify for tournaments such as the World Snooker Championships, and the UK Open.

A Classic Matches mode is included in the game, in which players can enter specific points of snooker matches from the past, such as the final frame of the 1985 World Championship final.

== Reception ==
Reception

Aggregate score
Aggregator	Score
GameRankings	(PC) 65% (PS2) 80% (Xbox) 82%

World Championship Snooker 2004 received "mixed or average" and "generally positive" reviews, according to review aggregator GameRankings.
