= 1986 China Masters =

China Masters
Tournament information
- Dates: September 1986
- Venue: Huangpu Stadium
- City: Shanghai
- Country: China
- Organisation: Matchroom Sport
- Format: Non-ranking event

Final
- Champion: (England) Steve Davis
- Runner-up: (Wales) Terry Griffiths
- Score: 3–0

The 1986 Camus China Masters was a professional non-ranking snooker tournament held in September 1986 in Huangpu Indoor Stadium, Shanghai, China.

Steve Davis won the tournament, defeating Terry Griffiths 3–0 in the final.

== Main draw ==
Quarter-finals; Best of 3 frames
(Wales) Terry Griffiths	2
Sung Lun Pak	1
(Northern Ireland) Dennis Taylor	2
Lim Koon Guan	0

Semi-finals; Best of 5 frames
(England) Steve Davis	3
Zung Chun Hong	0
(Wales) Terry Griffiths	3
(Northern Ireland) Dennis Taylor	2

Final; Best of 5 frames
(England) Steve Davis	3
(Wales) Terry Griffiths	0
