= Pro Pool =

2000 video game

- Developer: Blade Interactive
- Publisher: Codemasters
- Platform: Game Boy Color
- Release: NA: September 12, 2000; EU: 2000
- Genre: Sports
- Mode: Single-player

Pro Pool is a video game developed by Blade Interactive and published by Codemasters in 2000.

The game had been scheduled to be released in May 2000, but it was delayed for unknown reasons.

== Reception ==
Reception

Aggregate score
Aggregator	Score
GameRankings	75%

Review scores
Publication	Score
AllGame	3.5/5
Eurogamer	8/10
IGN	7/10

The game received favorable reviews according to the review aggregation website GameRankings.
