= World Championship Snooker 2003 (video game) =

2003 video game

- Developer: Blade Interactive
- Publisher: Codemasters
- Series: World Snooker Championship
- Platforms: PlayStation 2, Xbox, Windows
- Release: PlayStation 2, Xbox: AU: 20 June 2003; EU: 27 June 2003; Windows: EU: 28 November 2003; AU: 12 December 2003
- Genre: Sports
- Modes: Single-player, multiplayer

World Championship Snooker 2003 is a sports video game developed by Blade Interactive and published by Codemasters for PlayStation 2, Xbox, and Windows.

== Overview ==
In comparison to earlier titles, the game is not only snooker-specific. It also allows players to play eight-ball and nine-ball pool, as well as a number of minigames including Trick Shot, In My Pocket, and Against The Clock.

The game was also released with a version specifically designed to play in English pubs and bars. The game features commentary from both Dennis Taylor and (for the first time) John Virgo. John Virgo also lends his name to the unlockable trick shot mode, similar to the one seen in the snooker-based TV gameshow Big Break.

== Reception ==
Reception

Aggregate score
Aggregator	Score
GameRankings	(PC) 78% (PS2) 73% (XBOX) 84%

Review score
Publication	Score
Eurogamer	7/10

World Championship Snooker 2003 received "mixed or average" and "generally positive" reviews, according to review aggregator GameRankings. Thunderbolt Games scored the game very highly, at 90%, calling it the "game of the highest standard."

Eurogamer were less impressed with the game, scoring it 7/10, citing "WCS2003 may not look as good as it could do, or top Virtual Pool's still unbeaten control scheme for sheer genius, but it's got lots to do, [with] an unlockable John Virgo trickshot challenge (which is ace)[sic]".
