= 1983 Classic (snooker) =

The Lada Classic
Tournament information
- Dates: 9–16 January 1983
- Venue: Spectrum Arena
- City: Warrington
- Country: England
- Organisation: WPBSA
- Format: Non-Ranking event
- Total prize fund: £64,000
- Winner's share: £16,000
- Highest break: (Canada) Bill Werbeniuk (101)

Final
- Champion: (England) Steve Davis
- Runner-up: (Canada) Bill Werbeniuk
- Score: 9–5

The 1983 Lada Classic was the 4th edition of the professional invitational snooker tournament, which took place from 9–16 January 1983. The tournament was played at the Spectrum Arena, Warrington, Cheshire, and the tournament expanded from eight to sixteen professional players and ITV showed the coverage from the second day.

Steve Davis appeared in his third consecutive final and he regained the title beating Canada's Bill Werbeniuk by 9–5.

== Main draw ==
First Round; Best of 9 frames
(Wales) Terry Griffiths	1
(Wales) Doug Mountjoy	5
(Northern Ireland) Alex Higgins	4
(Canada) Bill Werbeniuk	5
(England) Tony Knowles	0
(Canada) Kirk Stevens	5
(Canada) Cliff Thorburn	5
(Wales) Cliff Wilson	3
(England) John Spencer	5
(Wales) Ray Reardon	3
(England) Jimmy White	3
(England) David Taylor	5
(Australia) Eddie Charlton	5
(England) John Virgo	2
(England) Steve Davis	5
(Northern Ireland) Dennis Taylor	2

Quarter-finals; Best of 9 frames
(Wales) Doug Mountjoy	2
(Canada) Bill Werbeniuk	5
(Canada) Kirk Stevens	5
(Canada) Cliff Thorburn	3
(England) John Spencer	5
(England) David Taylor	2
(Australia) Eddie Charlton	4
(England) Steve Davis	5

Semi-finals; Best of 9 frames
(Canada) Bill Werbeniuk	5
(Canada) Kirk Stevens	2
(England) John Spencer	4
(England) Steve Davis	5

Final; Best of 17 frames
(Canada) Bill Werbeniuk	5
(England) Steve Davis	9

== Final ==
Final: Best of 17 frames. Referee: Jim Thorpe. Spectrum Arena, Warrington, England, 16 January 1983.
Steve Davis; England	9–5	Bill Werbeniuk; Canada
15–103(76), 69–21, 63(54)–25, 17–76, 77–42, 71–13, 1–107 (63), 51–60, 68(60)–15, 0–81(81), 53–43, 59(56)–54, 65–29, 92–20
60	Highest break	81
0	Century breaks	0
3	50+ breaks	3

== Century breaks ==
101 (Canada) Bill Werbeniuk
