= World Championship Snooker (video game) =

2000 video game

- Developer(s): Blade Interactive
- Publisher(s): Codemasters
- Series: World Snooker Championship
- Platform(s): PlayStation, Windows
- Release: PlayStation: EU: 30 June 2000; Microsoft Windows: EU: 9 February 2001
- Genre(s): Sports
- Mode(s): Single-player, multiplayer

World Championship Snooker is a sports video game developed by Blade Interactive and published by Codemasters for PlayStation and Microsoft Windows.

== Overview ==
The game featured licenses and likenesses to players from within the top 32 players of the World Snooker Tour. The game allowed players to create an in-game character to play in various modes, including tournaments, on-off matches, and the official world championship. The game also featured a "Master Class" mode, that featured as an in-game tutorial and training mode.

The Master Class mode featured a list of 'lessons', that would teach the player the basics of playing, including spin, safety and also the rules of the game.

== Reception ==
Reception

Aggregate score
Aggregator	Score
GameRankings	68%

World Championship Snooker received "mixed or average" reviews, according to review aggregator GameRankings.

The game went on to become Blade Interactive's best selling boxed title in the United Kingdom.
