= 1980 Classic (1980/1981) =

Wilson's Classic
Tournament information
- Dates: 1–2 December 1980
- Venue: Blighty's
- City: Bolton
- Country: England
- Organisation: WPBSA
- Format: Non-Ranking event
- Total prize fund: £13,000
- Winner's share: £5,000
- Highest break: (Wales) Ray Reardon (76)

Final
- Champion: (England) Steve Davis
- Runner-up: (Northern Ireland) Dennis Taylor
- Score: 4–1

The 1980 Wilson's Classic (December) was the second edition of the professional invitational snooker tournament, which took place on 1 and 2 December 1980. The tournament was played at Blighty's in Farnworth, Bolton, Greater Manchester, and featured eight professional players.

Steve Davis won the tournament, beating Dennis Taylor 4–1 in the final.

Ray Reardon made the highest break of the tournament, 76, in the opening frame of the first match played.

== Main draw ==
Quarter-finals; Best of 3 frames		Semi-finals; Best of 3 frames		Final; Best of 7 frames
(England) John Spencer	0
(Wales) Ray Reardon	2	(Wales) Ray Reardon	0
(Northern Ireland) Dennis Taylor	2	(Northern Ireland) Dennis Taylor	2
(Wales) Terry Griffiths	1			(Northern Ireland) Dennis Taylor	1
(England) David Taylor	2			(England) Steve Davis	4
(Northern Ireland) Alex Higgins	0	(England) David Taylor	1
(Canada) Cliff Thorburn	0	(England) Steve Davis	2
(England) Steve Davis	2

== Final ==
Final: Best of 7 frames. Referee: Jim Thorpe. Blighty's, Farnworth, Bolton, England, 2 December 1980.
Dennis Taylor; Northern Ireland	1–4	Steve Davis; England
65 (53)–18, 5–74, 9–88, 40–62, 30–84
53	Highest break	?
0	Century breaks	0
1	50+ breaks	0
