= World Snooker Championship 2005 (video game) =

2005 video game

- Developer: Blade Interactive
- Publisher: Sega
- Series: World Snooker Championship
- Platforms: Microsoft Windows, PlayStation 2, Xbox, PlayStation Portable
- Release: Microsoft Windows, PlayStation 2, Xbox: EU: 15 April 2005; PlayStation Portable: EU: 1 September 2005
- Genre: Sports
- Modes: Single-player, multiplayer

World Snooker Championship 2005 is a sports video game developed by Blade Interactive and published by Sega for Microsoft Windows, PlayStation 2, Xbox and PlayStation Portable. It was also released as a PS2 Classic on the PlayStation Network in July 2012.

== Overview ==
The Pool mode from WSC 2005, displaying an altered sized table

This is the first game in the series to use the official World Snooker Championship moniker for the game. The game features modes similar to the previous entry in the series, with a career mode, tournament mode, and online modes, as well as quickplay and training modes. The game also features an unlockable "League of Champions" which allows you to replay past real-life events. The game features additional modes to previous releases, with options to play games such as bar billiards.

Paul Hunter was planned to feature on the game's cover, but would be diagnosed with cancer before the game's release. He would continue to play the sport until 2006, when he died from neuroendocrine tumours in the lining of his stomach. With later releases of the game by Sold-out Software, his image and likeness remained on the cover and in the game but with a tribute on the back of the box "Paul Hunter 1978 - 2006".

After meeting certain requirements, videos of real-life shots are played, showing professional players performing the same shots. In "Free Play" mode, other variables can be edited, such as number of reds on the table, and even the dimensions of the table itself.

== Reception ==
Reception

Aggregate score
Aggregator	Score
GameRankings	(PC) 64% (PS2) 67% (PSP) 75% (Xbox) 74%

Review scores
Publication	Score
Eurogamer	8/10 (PSP) 6/10
VideoGamer.com	8/10

World Snooker Championship 2005 received "mixed or average" and "generally positive" reviews, according to review aggregator GameRankings.

Eurogamer scored the console version highly with a 8/10 score, saying "it's a snooker game that gets pretty much everything spot on", but would later rate the PSP version lower at 6/10.
