= 1982 Classic (snooker) =

The Lada Classic

Tournament information
- Dates: 10–13 January 1982
- Venue: Civic Centre
- City: Oldham
- Country: England
- Organisation: WPBSA
- Format: Non-Ranking event
- Total prize fund: £15,000
- Winner's share: £5,000
- Highest break: (England) Steve Davis (147)

Final
- Champion: (Wales) Terry Griffiths
- Runner-up: (England) Steve Davis
- Score: 9–8

The 1982 Lada Classic was the 1982 edition of the professional invitational snooker tournament, which took place from 10 to 13 January 1982. The tournament was played at the Civic Centre in Oldham, Greater Manchester, and featured eight professional players.

Steve Davis made the first televised maximum 147 break in snooker history during his quarter-final match against John Spencer on Monday 11 January, winning a Lada car for his efforts. Terry Griffiths won the tournament, beating Davis 9–8 in the final.

== Main draw ==
Quarter-finals; Best of 9 frames		Semi-finals; Best of 9 frames		Final; Best of 17 frames
(England) Steve Davis	5
(England) John Spencer	2	(England) Steve Davis	5
(Wales) Ray Reardon	5	(Wales) Ray Reardon	4
(England) David Taylor	1			(England) Steve Davis	8
(Northern Ireland) Alex Higgins	5			(Wales) Terry Griffiths	9
(Northern Ireland) Dennis Taylor	1	(Northern Ireland) Alex Higgins	1
(Wales) Terry Griffiths	5	(Wales) Terry Griffiths	5
(Canada) Cliff Thorburn	1

== Final ==
Final: Best of 17 frames. Referee: Jim Thorpe. Civic Centre, Oldham, England, 13 January 1982.
Terry Griffiths; Wales	9–8	Steve Davis; England
14–101(96), 84(55)–24, 69–43, 11–79(57), 14–71, 62–31, 86(52)–39, 73–31, 86(86)–7, 57–47, 82–30, 38–80(52), 4–101(101), 37–71, 49–63, 0–132(50), 70–58
86	Highest break	101
0	Century breaks	1
3	50+ breaks	5

== Century breaks ==
147, 105, 101 (England) Steve Davis
