= Inferno Pool =

2008 video game

- Developer: Blade Interactive
- Publisher: Blade Interactive
- Platforms: iPhone, PlayStation 3 (PlayStation Network), Xbox 360 (Xbox Live Arcade)
- Release: iPhone; November 4, 2008; PlayStation 3: PAL: May 28, 2009; NA: October 28, 2009; Xbox 360; October 28, 2009
- Genre: Sports
- Modes: Single-player, multiplayer

Inferno Pool is a sports video game developed and published by Blade Interactive for iPhone in 2008, and for PlayStation 3 and Xbox 360 in 2009.

== Reception ==
Reception

Aggregate score
Aggregator	Score	
Aggregator	PS3	Xbox 360
Metacritic	66/100	62/100

Review scores
Publication	Score	
Publication	PS3	Xbox 360
IGN	5.3/10	5.3/10
PlayStation Official Magazine – UK	4/10	N/A
Official Xbox Magazine (UK)	N/A	7/10
Official Xbox Magazine (US)	N/A	7/10
Play	81%	N/A
TeamXbox	N/A	6.3/10

The PlayStation 3 and Xbox 360 versions received "mixed or average reviews" according to the review aggregation website Metacritic. Official Xbox Magazine UK gave the Xbox 360 version an average review while the game was still in development.

Since its release, the Xbox 360 version sold 3,126 units worldwide by January 2011. Sales moved up to 4,305 units by the end of 2011.
