= 1990 Centenary Challenge =

Invitational snooker tournament

Tournament information
- Dates: 16 May – 16 December 1990
- Venue: Civic Centre, Aylesbury; AECC, Aberdeen; Cafe Royal, London
- Country: United Kingdom
- Format: Invitational challenge match
- Total prize fund: £100,000
- Winner's share: £66,300

Final
- Champion: Stephen Hendry (SCO)
- Runner-up: Steve Davis (ENG)
- Score: 19–11 Aggregate Score over three matches

The 1990 Centenary Challenge was an invitational snooker challenge match played over three legs in 1990. Contested between Stephen Hendry and Steve Davis and with a prize fund of £100,000, it was snooker's richest head-to-head prize fund.

The tournament format differed from other snooker events and the players earned money for points, similar to golf's "skins" tournaments. Each point scored was worth £10, with bonuses of £250 for a break of 50 and a further £1,000 for a century break, plus an extra £1,000 for the frame winner.

It was held in three stages. The first was at the Civic Centre, Aylesbury on 16 May 1990 which was won 6–4 by Hendry, who won £15,920 of the £25,000 on offer (each player started on £12,500). The second leg was held at the AECC in Aberdeen on 23 September 1990, with Hendry again victorious 8–2 and winning £23,300. The third and final stage was played at Cafe Royal in London on 16 December 1990, which ended in a 5–5 draw, with Hendry winning 19–11 on aggregate and winning a total of £66,300.

== Results ==
1st leg: 10 frames. Civic Centre, Aylesbury, England, 16 May 1990.
| Stephen Hendry; Scotland | 6–4 | Steve Davis; England |
2nd leg: 10 frames. AECC, Aberdeen, Scotland, 23 Sep 1990.
| Stephen Hendry; Scotland | 8–2 | Steve Davis; England |
3rd leg: 10 frames. Cafe Royal, London, England, 16 Dec 1990.
| Stephen Hendry; Scotland | 5–5 | Steve Davis; England |
Final aggregate score
| Stephen Hendry; Scotland | 19–11 | Steve Davis; England |
