= World Championship Snooker 2002 (video game) =

2001 video game

- Developer(s): Blade Interactive
- Publisher(s): Codemasters
- Series: World Snooker Championship
- Platform(s): PlayStation 2
- Release: EU: 28 September 2001
- Genre(s): Sports
- Mode(s): Single-player, multiplayer

World Championship Snooker 2002 is a sports video game developed by Blade Interactive and published by Codemasters exclusively for PlayStation 2.

== Overview ==
Following on from its predecessor, graphical and textural implementations have been improved. The game offers the ability to set a "handicap" when playing against an AI opponent, or a friend, whilst also offering the ability to change the AI's difficulty level. There are aiming and potting "aids", to help the player, with a virtual line on screen displaying the line that the cueball would take

== Reception ==
Reception

Aggregate score
Aggregator	Score
GameRankings	72%

World Championship Snooker 2002 received "mixed or average" reviews, according to review aggregator GameRankings.
