= Classic (snooker) =

Snooker tournament

The Classic
Tournament information
- Venue: Morningside Arena
- Location: Leicester
- Country: England
- Established: 1980
- Organisation(s): World Professional Billiards and Snooker Association
- Format: Ranking
- Final year: 1992
- Final champion: Steve Davis

The Classic was a professional snooker tournament, which began in 1980 and ended in 1992. It was originally a non-ranking event, but became ranking in 1984. Steve Davis won the event six times and was the last champion.

== History ==
The tournament started as the Wilsons Classic in January 1980. It was an eight-man invitation event recorded by Granada Television. John Spencer defeated Alex Higgins 4–3 in the final to become the inaugural champion. The second event was held in December the same year, with Steve Davis defeating Dennis Taylor 4–1 in the final.

In 1982, the Russian automobile manufacturer Lada became the sponsor of the event and it was renamed to Lada Classic. Steve Davis made the first televised maximum break (147) in his quarter-finals match against John Spencer. Terry Griffiths won in the final 9–8 against Steve Davis. In 1983 the field was expanded to 16 players and moved to the Spectrum Arena in Warrington. Bill Werbeniuk reached the only final of his career, but lost 9–5 against Steve Davis.

In 1984, the event was granted ranking status. Steve Davis met Tony Meo in the final. Davis was level at 8 frames each with Tony Meo and only the colours were left in the deciding frame. As Meo lined up on the yellow, a spectator yelled out "Come on, Tony!". Although Meo took time to compose himself after the shout, he missed the yellow and Davis cleared the colours to win.

Mercantile Credit took over the sponsorship for the 1985 and the event was renamed Mercantile Credit Classic. Willie Thorne won the only ranking tournament of his career, by beating Cliff Thorburn 13–8 in the final. In 1986 Jimmy White won his first ranking tournament by defeating Thorburn 13–12 in the final. In 1987 the event moved to the Norbreck Castle Hotel in Blackpool, but only just the last 16 played in the final stages, as the opening rounds were played earlier in the season. Steve Davis won in the final 13–12 against Jimmy White. Davis won the event the following year, this time defeating John Parrott 13–11.

In 1989, Doug Mountjoy won his second consecutive ranking tournament, having previously won the UK Championship, by defeating Wayne Jones 13–11. The following year was a tournament of upsets, as only of four of the top sixteen players reached its seeded place. Steve James won his only ranking tournament by defeating Warren King 10–6 in the final. The tournament moved to the Bournemouth International Centre in 1991. Stephen Hendry reached the final of the tournament in 1991 and 1992, but lost 4–10 against Jimmy White and 8–9 against Steve Davis respectively. After the 1992 event, it was discontinued and replaced with the Welsh Open.

== Winners ==
Year	Winner	Runner-up	Final score	Venue	Season
The Classic (non-ranking)
1980	(England) John Spencer	(Northern Ireland) Alex Higgins	4–3	Manchester, England	1979/80
1980	(England) Steve Davis	(Northern Ireland) Dennis Taylor	4–1	Bolton, England	1980/81
1982	(Wales) Terry Griffiths	(England) Steve Davis	9–8	Oldham, England	1981/82
1983	(England) Steve Davis	(Canada) Bill Werbeniuk	9–5	Warrington, England	1982/83
The Classic (ranking)
1984	(England) Steve Davis	(England) Tony Meo	9–8	Warrington, England	1983/84
1985	(England) Willie Thorne	(Canada) Cliff Thorburn	13–8	Warrington, England	1984/85
1986	(England) Jimmy White	(Canada) Cliff Thorburn	13–12	Warrington, England	1985/86
1987	(England) Steve Davis	(England) Jimmy White	13–12	Blackpool, England	1986/87
1988	(England) Steve Davis	(England) John Parrott	13–11	Blackpool, England	1987/88
1989	(Wales) Doug Mountjoy	(Wales) Wayne Jones	13–11	Blackpool, England	1988/89
1990	(England) Steve James	(Australia) Warren King	10–6	Blackpool, England	1989/90
1991	(England) Jimmy White	(Scotland) Stephen Hendry	10–4	Bournemouth, England	1990/91
1992	(England) Steve Davis	(Scotland) Stephen Hendry	9–8	Bournemouth, England	1991/92
