= 1987 Classic (snooker) =

Tournament information
- Dates: 2–11 January 1987
- Venue: Norbreck Castle Hotel
- City: Blackpool
- Country: England
- Organisation: WPBSA
- Format: Ranking event
- Total prize fund: £250,000
- Winner's share: £50,000
- Highest break: Jimmy White (ENG) (126)

Final
- Champion: Steve Davis (ENG)
- Runner-up: Jimmy White (ENG)
- Score: 13–12

The 1987 Mercantile Credit Classic was the eighth edition of the professional snooker tournament which took place from 2–11 January 1987. The tournament was played at the Norbreck Castle Hotel, Blackpool, Lancashire. Television coverage was by ITV with weekday afternoon coverage on Channel 4.

Qualifying took place in November 1986. The leading players started at the last-64 stage and had to win two matches to reach the last-16 televised stage in January. Only five of the leading 16 seeded players reached the last-16 including defending champion Jimmy White and Steve Davis

In the first semi-final Jimmy White beat Dean Reynolds in the deciding frame after fluking a red and then making a break of 74. Steve Davis beat Stephen Hendry 9–3 in the second semi-final.

Defending champion Jimmy White made it to the final again but lost to Steve Davis in another 13–12 result. Davis won the first prize of £50,000 while White took the runners-up prize of £30,000 and another £5,000 for the high break prize for his break of 126 in the semi-finals.

The final attracted an average of 9.2 million viewers on ITV, peaking at 15.2 million.

== Main draw ==
Last 16; Best of 9 frames
1	Jimmy White (ENG)	5
Steve Duggan (ENG)	2
10	Terry Griffiths (WAL)	5
John Campbell (AUS)	3
Wayne Jones (WAL)	3
Cliff Wilson (WAL)	5
Barry West (ENG)	3
Dean Reynolds (ENG)	5
3	Steve Davis (ENG)	5
11	Tony Meo (ENG)	2
Eddie Charlton (AUS)	4
John Parrott (ENG)	5
Danny Fowler (ENG)	4
Stephen Hendry (SCO)	5
12	Silvino Francisco (RSA)	5
Peter Francisco (RSA)	1

Quarter-finals; Best of 9 frames
1	(England) Jimmy White	5
10	(Wales) Terry Griffiths	3
(Wales) Cliff Wilson	1
(England) Dean Reynolds	5
3	(England) Steve Davis	5
(England) John Parrott	4
(Scotland) Stephen Hendry	5
12	(South Africa) Silvino Francisco	0

Semi-finals; Best of 17 frames
1	(England) Jimmy White	9
(England) Dean Reynolds	8
3	(England) Steve Davis	9
(Scotland) Stephen Hendry	3

Final; Best of 25 frames
1	(England) Jimmy White	12
3	(England) Steve Davis	13

== Final ==
Final: Best of 25 frames. Referee: . Norbreck Castle Hotel, Blackpool, England, 10 & 11 January 1987.
Steve Davis; England	13–12	Jimmy White; England
First session: 52–61, 25–65, 66–36, 95–29, 74–12 (70), 56–66 (Davis 55), 65–21; Second session: 54–62, 68–66 (White 53), 6–69, 123–0 (119), 67–43, 37–71, 28–73, 69–58 (Davis 55, White 58); Third session: 73–22 (72), 7–107 (74), 72–2 (53), 7–94 (50), 71–0 (60), 36–47, 1–75 (75), 65–35, 55–80, 75–35
119	Highest break	75
1	Century breaks	0
7	50+ breaks	5

== Qualifying ==
=== Last-64 round ===
Jimmy White (ENG)	5–4	Steve Newbury (WAL)
Malcolm Bradley (ENG)	5–1	David Taylor (ENG)
Steve Duggan (ENG)	5–3	Neal Foulds (ENG)
Bill Werbeniuk (CAN)	5–1	Jack McLaughlin (NIR)
Terry Griffiths (WAL)	5–1	Joe O'Boye (NIR)
Dave Martin (ENG)	5–4	Geoff Foulds (ENG)
John Spencer (ENG)	5–3	Willie Thorne (ENG)
John Campbell (AUS)	5–2	Paddy Browne (IRL)
Wayne Jones (WAL)	5–2	Dennis Taylor (NIR)
Tony Kearney (IRL)	5–0	Murdo MacLeod (SCO)
Les Dodd (ENG)	5–4	Doug Mountjoy (WAL)
Cliff Wilson (WAL)	5–4	Ian Williamson (ENG)
Kirk Stevens (CAN)	5–3	Bob Chaperon (CAN)
Barry West (ENG)	5–4	Frank Jonik (CAN)
Cliff Thorburn (CAN)	5–0	Graham Cripsey (ENG)
Dean Reynolds (ENG)	5–4	Warren King (AUS)

Steve Davis (ENG)	5–0	Greg Jenkins (AUS)
John Virgo (ENG)	5–3	Mark Bennett (WAL)
Tony Meo (ENG)	5–4	John Rea (SCO)
Steve Longworth (ENG)	5–3	Tommy Murphy (NIR)
Rex Williams (ENG)	5–2	Mario Morra (CAN)
Eddie Charlton (AUS)	5–0	Mick Fisher (ENG)
Alex Higgins (NIR)	5–2	Colin Roscoe (WAL)
John Parrott (ENG)	5–2	Tony Jones (ENG)
Danny Fowler (ENG)	5–4	Tony Knowles (ENG)
Mike Hallett (ENG)	5–3	Bernie Mikkelsen (CAN)
Stephen Hendry (SCO)	5–3	Ray Reardon (WAL)
Jon Wright (ENG)	5–4	Eugene Hughes (IRL)
Silvino Francisco (RSA)	5–4	Jimmy van Rensberg (RSA)
Bob Harris (ENG)	5–3	Jim Wych (CAN)
Joe Johnson (ENG)	5–0	Eddie Sinclair (SCO)
Peter Francisco (RSA)	5–3	Marcel Gauvreau (CAN)

=== Last-32 round ===
(England) Jimmy White	5–0	(England) Malcolm Bradley
(England) Steve Duggan	5–0	(Canada) Bill Werbeniuk
(England) Terry Griffiths	5–4	(England) Dave Martin
(England) John Spencer	3–5	(Australia) John Campbell
(Wales) Wayne Jones	5–1	(Republic of Ireland) Tony Kearney
(England) Les Dodd	4–5	(Wales) Cliff Wilson
(Canada) Kirk Stevens	3–5	(England) Barry West
(Canada) Cliff Thorburn	4–5	(England) Dean Reynolds

(England) Steve Davis	5–2	(England) John Virgo
(England) Tony Meo	5–0	(England) Steve Longworth
(England) Rex Williams	4–5	(Australia) Eddie Charlton
(Northern Ireland) Alex Higgins	2–5	(England) John Parrott
(England) Danny Fowler	5–4	(England) Mike Hallett
(Scotland) Stephen Hendry	5–1	(England) Jon Wright
(South Africa) Silvino Francisco	5–3	(England) Bob Harris
(England) Joe Johnson	3–5	(South Africa) Peter Francisco

== Century breaks ==
(Including qualifying rounds)

- 140, 112 – Cliff Thorburn
- 136, 122, 111 – Stephen Hendry
- 131 – John Parrott
- 126 – Jimmy White
- 122, 102 – Mark Bennett
- 119, 108 – Steve Davis
- 112 – Danny Fowler
- 109 – Tommy Murphy
- 106 – Peter Francisco
- 104 – Steve Duggan
- 104 – Neal Foulds
- 103 – Terry Griffiths
- 100 – Jon Wright
