= Hydrophobia (video game) =

2010 video game

- Developer: Dark Energy Digital
- Publishers: Dark Energy Digital; Microsoft Studios (XBLA)
- Engine: HydroEngine
- Platforms: Xbox 360; Windows; PlayStation 3
- Release: Xbox 360; September 29, 2010; Windows: NA: May 9, 2011; EU: October 11, 2011; PlayStation 3: NA: November 1, 2011; EU: November 2, 2011; AU: April 25, 2012
- Genre: Action adventure
- Mode: Single-player

Hydrophobia is an action-adventure video game developed and published by Dark Energy Digital for Microsoft Windows, the PlayStation 3 and by Microsoft Studios for Xbox 360. The game was released for Xbox Live Arcade on September 29, 2010, as part of Xbox Live's Games Feast promotion, marking the first of three episodes. The PC version was released in 2011.

The game's engine, HydroEngine, provides realistic fluid dynamics technology for flowing water, allowing it to interact with the surroundings. The levels in the game were designed using InfiniteWorlds; a game creation system which uses bespoke procedural technology to significantly reduce file sizes, decreasing the overall file size of the game.

Hydrophobia received mixed reviews. Reviewers generally praised the game's dynamic water system, but felt the game was too short and repetitive. The developers released an update on December 21, 2010 addressing the complaints from feedback and reviews.

The game was supposed to be released in three episodes, but due to the poor reception the first episode gained, the company struggled and was placed in administration. As a result, the two other episodes were not made and the game was left on a cliffhanger.

== Gameplay ==
Hydrophobia features fully dynamic and free-flowing water

Gameplay involves the player being able to interact with the environment, and the realistic water dynamics. Rob Hewson (game designer at Blade Interactive) stated that "player versus environment is certainly a large part of the experience, the wonderful thing about water is that it is constantly affecting every area of the environment, so you get incredible amounts of emergent behaviour. The player constantly has to adapt to the environment and react quickly because doors, walls and windows are going to cave in differently each time according to the distribution of water."

Players can visit previous locations that have been submerged and are able to interact with them in various ways. Hewson stated that players are able to "fight through an area one time and there might be a foot of water flowing around and affecting the environment, another person might play through the same area and blow out walls or windows causing a great deal of water to flow into the scene, meaning perhaps the gameplay switches to floating cover. Another player might shoot fuel barrels which let even more water into the scene but also spawn floating fuel fires which are carried around with the flow and find they need to resort to underwater action."

== Plot ==
The game is set in the mid 21st century when the world has fallen into the chaos of the "Great Population Flood", and takes place aboard the Queen of the World, a city-sized luxury ocean vessel built by a group of corporate giants known as the Five Founding Fathers who, due to the QOTW, have prospered while the rest of the world suffered. At the beginning of the game, the craft is bombed by a group of fanatical terrorists known as the Malthusians, named after political economist Thomas Malthus who predicted that population growth would one day outpace agricultural production, returning society to a subsistent level of existence. The Malthusians have a plan to murder the majority of humans on the planet, so that the survivors wouldn't suffer from the effects of the population explosion. Their slogans, including "Save the World - Kill Yourself", are written on the walls and displayed on computer screens all over the ship. Kate Wilson, the protagonist, is a systems engineer who becomes a reluctant hero when the Malthusians attack and take over the QOTW.

After battling through the Malthusian force, Kate confronts Mila in the final battle. Mila is electrocuted when Kate destroys the security combat bot. Kate injects herself with an antidote for her nano-poisoning but collapses in pain.

== Development and release ==
Hydrophobia was first revealed on January 15, 2007. The first extensive details were released on May 8, 2007, where the game's dynamic water system was revealed. The game was originally set for a March 2009 retail release, however this was later pushed back. On September 30, 2009 more details were released; developer Dark Energy Digital revealed that the game would first be coming to Xbox Live Arcade, and would be released in episodes. A playable version of the game was unveiled at PAX East in 2010. The game was released on September 29, 2010 as part of Xbox Live's Games Feast promotion, marking the first of three episodes. PC and PlayStation 3 versions were planned for later release.

The HydroEngine is a video game engine created by Dark Energy Digital for Hydrophobia. Developed over three years, the engine has a unique capability to model flowing water and other liquids with a realism unprecedented in video games, according to the developers. It is entirely dynamic, which means the effect is not repeated and thus allowing different effects each time. InfiniteWorlds is Dark Energy's development platform, which interfaces directly with the HydroEngine. According to the developers, it is "an underlying architecture, which can interface with bespoke editors tailored to individual game projects." InfiniteWorlds was in development for five years.

=== Hydrophobia Pure ===
After its release, Hydrophobia received poor reviews from some media outlets, prompting contention between the developer and some reviewers. Pete Jones, Joint Design Director for Dark Energy Digital, spoke of the difficulties experienced in an interview with GamingNexus. "Criticism can be hard. You make games because you love games, perhaps on occasions we may have seemed a little too defensive and disappointed. Pride can be a big virtue as well because you need to be intensely proud of something you're creating in any endeavor." Jones further stated that it was difficult to accept that some consumers and critics disliked the game. He conceded that "if the community doesn't like it we try and change it no matter whose toes we tread on."

In response to some of the harsh feedback and reviews, the developers revisited core gameplay mechanics and issues addressed by both reviewers and Hydrophobia's community. In an interview with GamesTM, Senior Creative Designer Rob Hewson discussed the process for addressing issues found. "Firstly we analysed every single review of the game [...] breaking down all the negative and positive comments into categories" he stated. "Once we had analysed the data, we set about improving every single element of the game according to that data," The subsequent updates were released in a title update dubbed Hydrophobia Pure on December 21, 2010. The 4 megabyte update contains various graphic and physics enhancements, remapped controls, overhauled camera and map systems, improved gameplay mechanics, additional HUD information and removal or shortening of dialogue and cutscenes. The game was also reduced from its original price, with the update free for players who already owned the game.

=== Hydrophobia Prophecy ===
Hydrophobia Prophecy (also known as Hydrophobia: Prophecy on Steam) is described as version 1.5 of the Xbox 360 version of the game. Hydrophobia Prophecy was released on PlayStation 3 and on Microsoft Windows via Steam. The game includes new levels and previously existing levels have been reworked.

== Reception ==
Reception

Aggregate score
Aggregator	Score		
Aggregator	PC	PS3	Xbox 360
Metacritic	64/100	70/100	59/100

Review scores
Publication	Score		
Publication	PC	PS3	Xbox 360
Destructoid	N/A	N/A	3.5/10
Edge	N/A	N/A	3/10
Eurogamer	4/10	N/A	4/10
GamePro	2.5/5	N/A	3/5
GameRevolution	N/A	N/A	D
GameSpot	7.5/10	N/A	6.5/10
GameTrailers	N/A	N/A	6.8/10
GameZone	N/A	N/A	7/10
IGN	N/A	8/10	8/10
Joystiq	N/A	N/A	3/5
PlayStation Official Magazine – UK	N/A	6/10	N/A
Official Xbox Magazine (US)	N/A	N/A	9/10
PC Gamer (US)	39%	N/A	N/A
Push Square	N/A	7/10	N/A
411Mania	N/A	N/A	8.4/10
Slant Magazine	N/A	N/A	2.5/5

Hydrophobia and Hydrophobia Prophecy received "mixed or average reviews" according to the review aggregation website Metacritic.

1Up.com's Matt Clark commended the water based gameplay, stating, "That anxiety I mentioned earlier, the feeling that you're likely to drown at any moment, is present throughout the game's seven hours." Edge also praised the credibility of the water's movement, as did IGN's Daemon Hatfield, who called it "impressive". McKinley Noble of GamePro also made mention of the impressive water dynamics, adding that the game's challenge rooms extend gameplay. Joystiq, however, was not impressed with the effects, stating "the water isn't even as impressive as you might expect." Official Xbox Magazine's Cameron Lewis praised the dynamic and emergent gameplay, stating "the more you experiment with them, the more Hydrophobia's dynamic environments come to life".

Clark criticized the degree of repetition in the Xbox 360 version. He stated that while using one of many varied ways to dispatch an enemy is fun the first time, the enjoyment loses its luster as the player repeats these actions. He further stated that "without the dynamic water effects, Hydrophobia is just a passable Live Arcade title." Edge also panned most of the core gameplay, saying "the lacklustre combat, the imprecise platforming, the lack of meaningful feedback, the repetitive hunting for keys to locked doors, the over-fussy map, the intolerable cover system and the poor signposting that will leave even the most attentive player floundering for direction and purpose. These factors frustrate, pulling the game time and again under the high mark established by its water." Noble cited stiff gameplay controls, awkward action sequences, and dated visuals adding that these weaknesses "do enough harm to sabotage a unique idea." Noble further stated that the game "drowns under a sea of irritating technical flaws."

411Mania gave Hydrophobia 8.4 out of 10, calling it "an engaging story, though a bit straightforward, brought to life by the incredible HydroEngine. Seriously, if the sole purpose of this game was to show what could be done with the engine, then it was mission accomplished. But there is more to it, [as] creative kills, and the Tomb Raider like platforming add to the game. I can't wait for more from Dark Energy." However, Slant Magazine gave it two-and-a-half stars out of five, saying, "In the tradition of the B movie, Hydrophobia's low production values make me more affectionate toward it. If this were a $60 retail release, the visual problems and lack of narrative oomph would make it untenable. But at 1200 MS points, it's a solid piece of entertainment. You won't have your mind blown open, but it's definitely an enjoyable five hours (extended by the Challenge Room leaderboards), and a promising start for a new developer." Metro gave it three out of ten, saying, "There are some interesting ideas and visual effects at play here, but they're not nearly strong enough to support such a monotonous adventure."

The Xbox 360 version sold 9,723 units in its first week. As of October 2010 sales moved up to 17,865 units. By January 2011, sales moved up even higher to 24,532 units. (Note: Sales data was driven from the game's leaderboards, which only post a score once players complete the game. Thus actual sales are likely to be higher.)
