= G-Surfers =

2002 video game

G-Surfers / HSX: Hypersonic.Xtreme
- European cover art
- Developer: Blade Interactive
- Publishers: EU: Midas Interactive Entertainment; NA: Majesco
- Platform: PlayStation 2
- Release: EU: January 25, 2002; NA: January 28, 2003
- Genre: Futuristic racing game
- Modes: Single-player, Multiplayer

G-Surfers is a 2002 futuristic racing video game for the PlayStation 2 console developed by Blade Interactive. The game was influenced by F-Zero and the Wipeout video game series, resulting in a very similar game and very mixed reviews. It was released by Midas Interactive Entertainment in Europe on 25 January 2002, having originally been scheduled on 28 September 2001, and was published by Majesco in the United States on 28 January 2003 under the title HSX: Hypersonic.Xtreme.

== Gameplay ==
Gameplay screenshot

The game features 30 tracks and 15 crafts. While the first six races are available immediately, the player must complete the game to unlock more tutorials and tracks. It also features "TrakEdit", a mode allowing players to create their own tracks using various objects. Tutorials guide the player to this mode. A two-player split screen mode is included in the game, as well as the Time Trial and Cup racing modes for one player.

The player should choose a craft they like to use in the game, and then go through five series (each including six tracks). The player must finish in first, second or third place to win. The player unlocks more material for successfully completing a series. The tracks incorporate twists, turns, loops, corkscrews, and jumps. The player must avoid obstacles and hazards such as falling off the track. In addition, there are boost and health icons throughout each track.

== Reception ==
Reception

Aggregate score
Aggregator	Score
Metacritic	53/100

Review scores
Publication	Score
4Players	68%
Edge	6/10
Game Informer	7.25/10
GameSpot	3.8/10
GameSpy	1/5
GameZone	5.5/10
IGN	5/10
Jeuxvideo.com	8/20
Official U.S. PlayStation Magazine	2.5/5
X-Play	3/5

G-Surfers received "mixed or average" reviews, according to the review aggregation website Metacritic. Edge gave the game a mixed review while it was still in development. IGN's Kaiser Hwang was more critical but felt that it is something "you've seen before." GameSpy gave it a negative review, saying that while the game "indisputably possesses both a real-time track system and instant functionality, the feature it needs the most is the one it doesn't have -- weapons." Hitting at ramps and damaging the craft was also criticized.

== In popular culture ==
The game was briefly shown in the 2008 film Meet Dave.
