= Dark Energy Digital =

British video game developer

Dark Energy Digital Ltd.
- Company type: Defunct
- Industry: Video games
- Founded: 1998
- Defunct: 2012
- Headquarters: Manchester, England
- Key people: Deborah & Pete Jones (managing directors); Gary Leach (technical director)
- Products: World Snooker Championship; Hydrophobia

Dark Energy Digital was a privately owned video game developer and publisher based in the United Kingdom. It was formed from members of Blade Interactive, which continues to operate as a separate company. On 28 September 2007, following the public announcement of Hydrophobia, it was announced that a deal had been made between Blade Interactive and Total Asset Limited and was to become a publisher in its own right and publish its own titles. On 19 March 2012, it was announced the company had closed due to low sales of Hydrophobia.

== History ==
Blade Interactive was founded in 1998 and are largely known as a developer of pool and snooker games. Three years were spent developing HydroEngine, their dynamic fluid game engine used in Hydrophobia. As part of a major expansion, Blade Interactive has a new mobile game development division based at Blade Interactive's new office complex in Manchester, known as 'BIG' (Blade Interactive Games). One of the founding Directors of Blade Interactive, Peter Jones, was formally Managing Director of Mirage Technologies Multimedia Ltd, the studio behind Rise of the Robots and Rise 2: Resurrection and the PlayStation/PC title Bedlam.

On March 19, 2012, the company suffered due to not having enough money, went broke and was ultimately put into administrative control. It is in the process of selling IP and assets, most notably the Hydrophobia series and the Hydroengine.3

== HydroEngine ==
HydroEngine logo

The HydroEngine is a video game engine created by Blade Interactive for their video game Hydrophobia for Microsoft Windows, PlayStation 3 and Xbox 360. Developed over three years, it has a unique capability which allows modelling of flowing water and other liquids for the first time. It is entirely dynamic, which means the effect is not repeated and thus allowing different effects each time. The engine can also interface with solid body physics engines such as Havok, which allows objects and debris to be carried with the flow. Another new development platform, called the InfiniteWorldsGCS, interfaces directly with the HydroEngine. According to the developers it is "an underlying architecture, which can interface with bespoke editors tailored to individual game projects".

== Games ==
=== Developed by Blade Interactive ===
- Pro Pool (2000) - Game Boy Color
- World Championship Snooker (2001) - Microsoft Windows, PlayStation
- World Championship Snooker 2002 (2001) - Microsoft Windows, PlayStation 2
- G-Surfers (2002) - PlayStation 2
- World Championship Snooker 2003 (2003) - Xbox, PlayStation 2
- World Championship Pool 2004 (2003) - Xbox, GameCube, PlayStation 2, Microsoft Windows
- World Championship Snooker 2004 (2004) - Microsoft Windows, PlayStation 2, Xbox
- Pool Shark 2 (2004) - PlayStation 2, Xbox, Microsoft Windows
- Room Zoom: Race for Impact (2004) - Microsoft Windows, Xbox, Playstation 2
- Pocket Racers (2005) - PSP
- The Hustle: Detroit Streets (2005) - PSP, PlayStation 2, Xbox
- World Snooker Championship 2005 (2005) - Microsoft Windows, PlayStation 2, PlayStation Portable, Xbox
- World Snooker Championship 2007 (2007) - PlayStation 2, PlayStation 3, PlayStation Portable, Xbox 360
- WSC Real 08/09: World Snooker Championship (2008) - Wii, Microsoft Windows, PlayStation 3, PlayStation Portable, Xbox 360
- Inferno Pool (2008) - iPhone, PlayStation 3, Xbox 360

=== Developed by Dark Energy Digital ===
- Hydrophobia (2010) - Xbox 360, Microsoft Windows, PlayStation 3
- WSC Real 11: World Snooker Championship (2011) - Microsoft Windows, PlayStation 3, Xbox 360
