= Steve Davis =

English snooker player (born 1957)

Steve Davis OBE
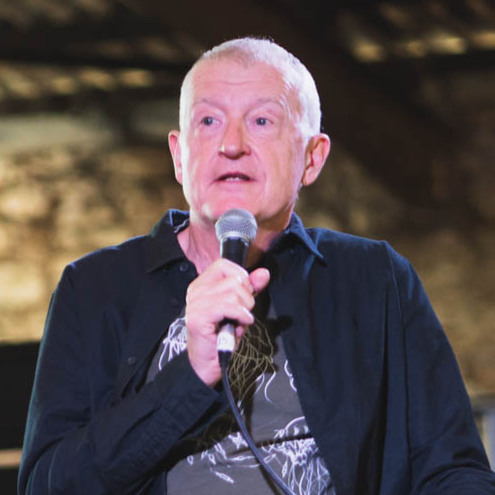
- Davis in 2022

Personal information
- Nicknames: The Nugget; Romford Slim; Interesting
- Born: 22 August 1957 (age 69) Plumstead, London, England

Sport
- Country: England
- Sport: Snooker
- Professional: 1978–2016
- Highest ranking: 1 (1983/84–1989/90)
- Maximum breaks: 1
- Century breaks: 338

Tournament wins
- Ranking: 28
- World Championship: 1981; 1983; 1984; 1987; 1988; 1989

Steve Davis (born 22 August 1957) is an English former professional snooker player who now works as a BBC commentator and analyst, DJ, electronic musician and author. After turning professional in 1978, he dominated the sport in the 1980s, when he reached eight World Snooker Championship finals in nine years, won six world titles, and held the world number one ranking for seven consecutive seasons. He won 15 Triple Crown titles, the third most of any player, and 28 ranking titles, which place him fifth on the all-time list. He is the only snooker player to have won the BBC Sports Personality of the Year Award, which he received in 1988. He was appointed MBE in the 1988 Birthday Honours and OBE in the 2000 New Year Honours.

At the 1982 Classic, Davis made the first officially recognised and first televised maximum break in professional competition. He became widely known for his role in the 1985 World Championship final, one of the sport's most famous matches, which he lost to Dennis Taylor on the last black ball of a 68-minute deciding frame. The conclusion of the match attracted 18.5 million UK viewers, still a record for the largest British television audience after midnight. In the 1987–88 season, Davis became the first player to win all three Triple Crown events in one season, a feat since matched by only two other players. He won his last major title at the 1997 Masters, aged 39, but was still ranked inside the elite top 16 at age 50. He made his 30th and final Crucible appearance in 2010, aged 52, and retired at the end of the 2015–16 season, aged 58, having played for 38 seasons on the professional tour.

Outside snooker, Davis played nine-ball pool and represented Europe in eleven consecutive Mosconi Cups from 1994 to 2004. A keen chess and poker player, he served as president of the British Chess Federation from 1996 to 2001 and competed in televised poker tournaments. In 2013, he was a contestant on I'm a Celebrity...Get Me Out of Here!. A progressive rock enthusiast, he works as a radio broadcaster and club DJ; he co-founded the electronic music band the Utopia Strong with Kavus Torabi and Michael J. York. He has authored or co-authored books on snooker, chess, cooking and music.

== Career ==
=== Early career (1970–1979) ===
Davis was born on 22 August 1957 in Plumstead, London, the elder of two boys; Keith being his younger brother. Davis's father Bill, a keen player, introduced him to snooker at the age of 12 and took him to play at his local working men's club. Bill gave Steve an instructional book: How I Play Snooker by the unrelated Joe Davis. They studied the book, Davis later basing his technique on it during the 1970s. He began playing at the Lucania Snooker Club in Romford. The club manager brought his talent to the attention of Barry Hearn (chairman of the Lucania chain of snooker halls) when Davis was 18 and Hearn became his friend and manager. Paid £25 a match by Hearn, Davis toured the United Kingdom and participated in challenge matches against established professionals such as Ray Reardon, John Spencer and Alex Higgins. Around this time he was nicknamed "Nugget" because, according to Hearn, "you could put your case of money on him and you knew you were going to get paid."

Davis won the English Under-19 Billiards Championship in 1976. One of his last wins as a snooker amateur was against Tony Meo, another future professional, in the final of the 1978 Pontins Spring Open. He defended his title a year later, defeating future rival Jimmy White 7–4 in the final. Davis applied in 1978 to become a professional and was initially rejected, before being accepted with effect from 17 September 1978, becoming the youngest of the professional players. He made his professional television debut on Pot Black, where he played against Fred Davis. He played in his first World Snooker Championship in 1979, having won two qualifying matches, but lost 11–13 to Dennis Taylor in the first round proper.

=== Early success (1980–1984) ===
At the 1980 World Snooker Championship he reached the quarter-finals, defeating Patsy Fagan and defending champion Terry Griffiths before losing to Alex Higgins 9–13. He won his first major title that year, the 1980 UK Championship, beating Griffiths 9–0 in the semi-finals and Higgins 16–6 in the final. After winning his first title, he won the Wilson's Classic in 1980, the Yamaha Organs and English Professional in 1981, and was the bookmakers' favourite to win the 1981 World Snooker Championship despite being seeded 13th. Davis reached the final by defeating White in the first round, Higgins in the second round, Griffiths in the quarter-finals and defending champion Cliff Thorburn in the semi-final. In the final, he won 18–12 against Doug Mountjoy to take his first world championship.

Davis completed a 9–0 whitewash victory over Dennis Taylor in the International Open final and retained the UK Championship with a 16–3 win over Griffiths in the final, winning five events in 1981. On Monday 11 January 1982, Davis compiled the first televised maximum break at the Classic at Queen Elizabeth Hall in Oldham against John Spencer. As Lada were sponsoring the event, they offered Davis a car for completing the break. He reached the final, but lost 8–9 to Griffiths in the final. However, later that month Davis defeated Griffiths 9–5 in the Masters final, to win his first title.

His 18-month period of dominance ended at the 1982 World Snooker Championship, where he lost 1–10 to Tony Knowles in the first round. Despite this, he finished the season as the world number one for the first time. Davis lost to Griffiths in the quarter-finals of the 1982 UK Championship later that year. After those two defeats, he won the World Doubles Championship with partner Tony Meo. He overcame Thorburn 18–6 in the 1983 World Snooker Championship, regaining the title with a session to spare in the final. Davis led 7–0 against Higgins in the 1983 UK Championship final, but lost on a deciding frame 15–16. At the 1984 World Snooker Championship, he was the first player to retain his title at the Crucible Theatre – the event's venue since 1977 – by defeating Jimmy White 18–16 in the final, winning his third world championship. Davis also won the 1984 UK Championship, beating Higgins 16–8 in the final.

=== 1985 World Snooker Championship ===
At the 1985 World Snooker Championship, Davis defeated Neal Foulds, David Taylor, Griffiths and Reardon en route to the championship final, where his opponent was Dennis Taylor. Davis won all of the frames in the first session, and the first of the evening, to lead 8–0 but Taylor recovered to trail 7–9. Taylor levelled the match for the first time at 11–11; after Davis took the lead again, Taylor fought back a second time from 12–15 to level at 15–15 and a third time from 15–17 to 17–17, forcing a deciding frame that lasted 68 minutes. With the scores close, Taylor potted the final colours to leave the black ball. With Davis leading 62–59 in the frame at that point, the player who potted the black ball would win the championship. After several failed attempts to pot it by each player, Taylor potted the ball to win the title. The final was watched by 18.5 million viewers, setting all-time records for BBC Two and for a post-midnight audience on British television. The final, later called the "black ball final", was voted the ninth-greatest sporting moment of all time in a 2002 Channel 4 poll; Davis's disbelief and Taylor's triumphant, pointing finger have been replayed many times on television.

=== Later World Snooker Championship victories (1985–1989) ===
Davis and Taylor met again in the final of the 1985 Grand Prix, but this time Davis won in a deciding frame. At 10 hours 21 minutes, it was the longest one-day final in snooker history. Davis trailed Willie Thorne 8–13 in the 1985 UK Championship final. Thorne missed a blue off the spot, which would have given him a 14–8 lead; Davis won the frame and seven of the next eight to win 16–14. Davis also won the 1986 British Open, with a 12–7 win over Thorne. At the 1986 World Championship, Davis defeated White 13–5 in the quarter-finals and Thorburn 16–12 in the semi-finals. His opponent in the final was Joe Johnson, who started the tournament as an outsider to win, with odds of 150–1. Davis lost the match, 12–18. At the end of 1986, he beat Foulds 16–7 to retain the 1986 UK Championship.

Davis began 1987 by winning the Classic 13–12 against defending champion Jimmy White. At the 1987 World Snooker Championship, he defeated Griffiths 13–5 in the quarter-final and White 16–11 in the semi-final. Meeting Johnson again in the final, he established a 14–10 lead after three sessions. Johnson reduced Davis's lead to 14–13, but Davis took four of the next five frames to win the match 18–14 and regain the title, his fourth world championship. In December he retained his UK title with a 16–14 win against White in the final. Davis retained the Classic in 1988 before claiming his second Masters title: in the final he completed a 9–0 whitewash of Mike Hallett, the only such result in the event's history. He also won the World Cup with England and secured his fourth Irish Masters title. In that year's World Championship Davis defeated Hallett 13–1, Tony Drago 13–4 and Thorburn 16–8 en route to the final, where he met Griffiths. Davis established a 5–2 lead after the first session, but Griffiths levelled at 8–8 after the second. On the second day of the match, Davis took ten out of thirteen frames to win his fifth world title 18–11.

He won the first ranking event of the 1988–89 snooker season, a 12–6 victory over White in the International Open. During the same match, Davis became the first player to make three consecutive century breaks in a major tournament. In October, he won the Grand Prix final 10–6 against Alex Higgins and held the World, UK, Masters, Grand Prix, Classic and Irish Masters titles simultaneously. His four-year unbeaten run in the UK Championship ended in December with a 3–9 semi-final loss to Hendry. Davis did not win another major title until the 1989 World Championship, where he beat Hendry 16–9 in the semi-finals before the most decisive victory in a world final of the modern era: an 18–3 win against John Parrott, for his sixth world championship. He retained the Grand Prix in October, beating Dean Reynolds 10–0 in the final – the first whitewash in a ranking-event final. By the end of the 1980s, Davis was snooker's first millionaire.

=== Last ranking event win (1990–1995) ===
Davis began the 1990s by winning the Irish Masters for the fifth time, defeating Taylor 9–4. Davis was denied an eighth consecutive appearance in the 1990 World Snooker Championship final by Jimmy White, who won their semi-final 16–14. He was succeeded as world number one by new world champion Stephen Hendry, at the end of the 1989–90 snooker season, Davis having held the spot for seven consecutive seasons. The following season, Davis reached the final of the UK Championship again and played Hendry, losing on a deciding frame 15–16. Davis won the Irish Masters again, defeating Parrott 9–5 in the final. At the world championship, Davis reached the semi-final but lost to Parrott 16–10.

Davis won the Classic, defeating Hendry 9–8, and then won the Asian Open by beating Alan McManus 9–3. He did not win a match at the 1992 World Snooker Championship, however, as he was beaten 4–10 by Peter Ebdon, the first time he had lost in the opening round in nine years. He won the European Open in 1993 where he completed a 10–4 victory against Hendry in the final. Davis won a seventh Irish Masters event in 1993, where he defeated McManus 9–4. At the 1993 World Snooker Championship, Davis defeated Ebdon, who had defeated him the year previously 10–3, but lost again to McManus in the second round 13–11. Davis won his eighth (and final) Irish Masters event in 1994 with a deciding frame win over McManus. Davis progressed past the second round for the first time in three years at the 1994 World Snooker Championship, defeating Dene O'Kane, Steve James and Wattana but was defeated by Hendry 9–16 in the semi-final. Over the next two seasons, Davis won consecutive Welsh Open titles. At the 1994 event, he completed three consecutive whitewash 5–0 victories and won the final 9–6 over McManus. The following season at the 1995 event, he defeated John Higgins 9–3 in the final. This victory was his last ranking title of his career.

=== Masters champion for the last time (1996–2000) ===
In 1996, Davis reached the quarter-finals of both the Masters and World Championship, losing to McManus and Ebdon, respectively. The following year, at the 1997 Masters, Davis reached the final, defeating McManus, Ebdon and Doherty. Trailing O'Sullivan 4–8 in the final, Davis won six frames in a row, securing a 10–8 victory. The win was Davis's last fully professional title of his career, his third Masters title. At the world championship later that year, Davis defeated David McLellan in the opening round, before losing to Doherty 3–13. He also reached the second round in the 1998 event, where he defeated Simon Bedford, but lost to Williams 6–13.

For the 1998–99 season, Davis's best result was reaching the quarter-finals at the 1998 UK Championship, the first time he had progressed past the third round in five years, but lost to Paul Hunter. He also reached the same stage at the 1999 Welsh Open, but lost to Williams. However, at the 1999 World Snooker Championship, he lost in the first round on a deciding frame to Joe Perry. Davis did reach the quarter-finals of the 1999 British Open in 1999–2000, but only won one match at the 2000 World Snooker Championship, defeating Graeme Dott, but losing to Higgins 11–13. After this loss, Davis fell out of the top 16 in the world rankings for the 2000–01 season for the first time since 1980 and would not play in the Masters for the first time since he first qualified.

=== Fall out of the top 16 (2000–2005) ===
Davis's best result during the season was a quarter-final appearance at the 2001 Irish Masters losing to O'Sullivan. Davis failed to qualify for the 2001 World Snooker Championship, losing 6–10 to Andy Hicks in the last qualifying round. This was the first time Davis would be absent from the event since his debut in 1979. After the loss, he contemplated retirement, but said that it would be the "easy thing to do". Since he still enjoyed the challenge of professional play he continued into the 2001–02 snooker season and reached the semi-finals of the 2002 LG Cup and the quarter-finals of the 2003 Irish Masters the following season. However, Davis was unable to qualify for the 2002 World Snooker Championship, losing 8–10 to Robin Hull in the final round of qualification.

Despite this, his previous results were enough to regain his place in the top 16 for the 2003–2004 season, starting ranked 11th in the world. Despite not progressing past the third round in any other events, Davis reached the final at the 2004 Welsh Open. This was nine years after he last won a ranking event at the 1995 Welsh Open. He defeated Mark King, Higgins, Milkins and Marco Fu and met O'Sullivan in the final. In the best of 17 frames match, he led 8–5, but lost 8–9. He reached the quarter-finals of the 2005 World Snooker Championship, losing to eventual winner Shaun Murphy.

=== Later career (2005–2010) ===
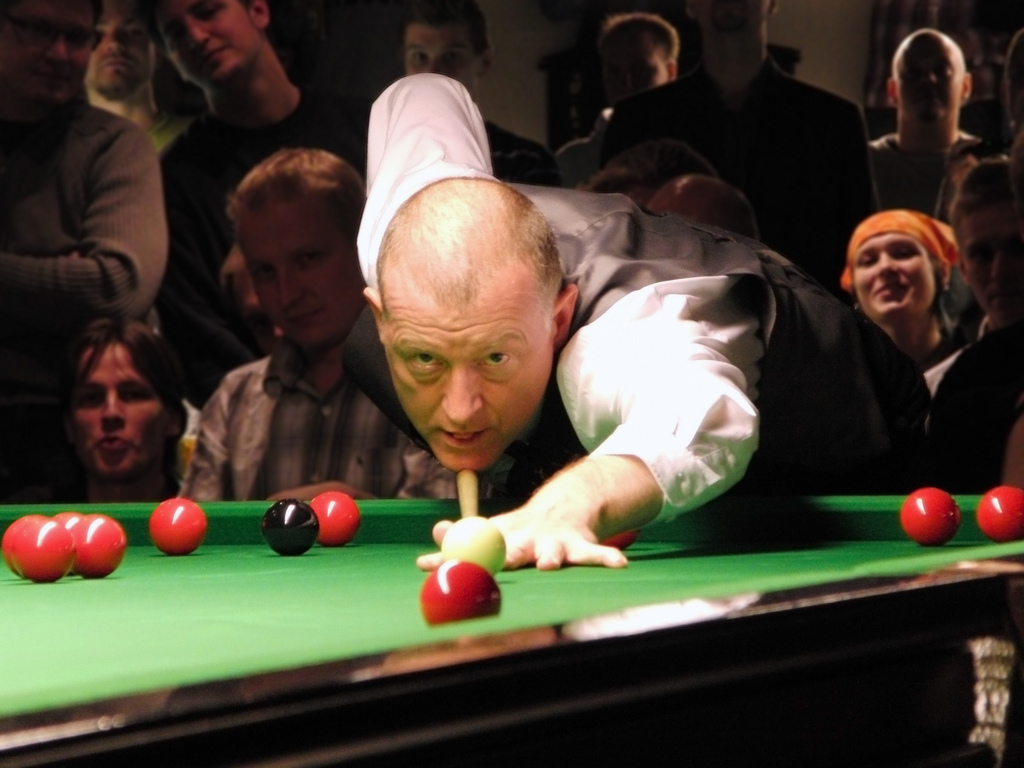
Davis during a 2008 match against Ville Pasanen

Davis reached his 100th major career final at the 2005 UK Championship in York, his first appearance in the event's final since 1990. He beat defending champion Stephen Maguire and Hendry before he lost 6–10 to Ding Junhui in the final. Davis brushed off suggestions of retirement before the World Championships, and reached the second round where he lost to Murphy. His performances during the 2006–07 season, including reaching the 2006 UK Championship quarter-finals and the Welsh Open semi-finals, ensured that Davis was still a top-16 player at the age of 50. Although Davis dropped out of the top sixteen a year later, he reached successive quarter-finals at the Shanghai Masters and Grand Prix in 2008. At the 2009 World Snooker Championship, Davis lost 2–10 to Neil Robertson in the first round. At the 2009 UK Championship, he defeated Michael Judge 9–7 to set up a first-round match against Hendry which he lost 6–9.

He qualified for the 2010 World Snooker Championship, his 30th time at the event, by defeating Adrian Gunnell 10–4. In the first round, Davis beat Mark King 10–9; at 52, he was the oldest player to win a match at the Crucible since Eddie Charlton defeated Cliff Thorburn in 1989. In the second round, against defending champion John Higgins, Davis won 13–11, a win commentator Clive Everton called "the greatest upset in the 33 years the Crucible has been hosting the championship." This made him the oldest world quarter-finalist since Charlton in 1983. In the quarter-final match against Australian Neil Robertson, Davis lost 5–13. Despite having his best run at the World Championship for five years and reaching the quarter-finals for only the second time since 1994, this was his last appearance at the Crucible; he failed to qualify for the tournament again before his retirement. O'Sullivan equalled Davis's record of 30 Crucible appearances in 2022.

Davis participated in the Players Tour Championship in 2010; his best result was at the Paul Hunter Classic, where he reached the quarter-finals before losing 1–4 to Shaun Murphy. He finished 67th on the Order of Merit. He reached the final of the 2010 World Seniors Championship, losing 1–4 to Jimmy White. He narrowly reached the last qualifying round of the 2011 World Snooker Championship by defeating Jack Lisowski 10–9 before losing 2–10 to Stephen Lee.

=== Retirement (2010–2016) ===
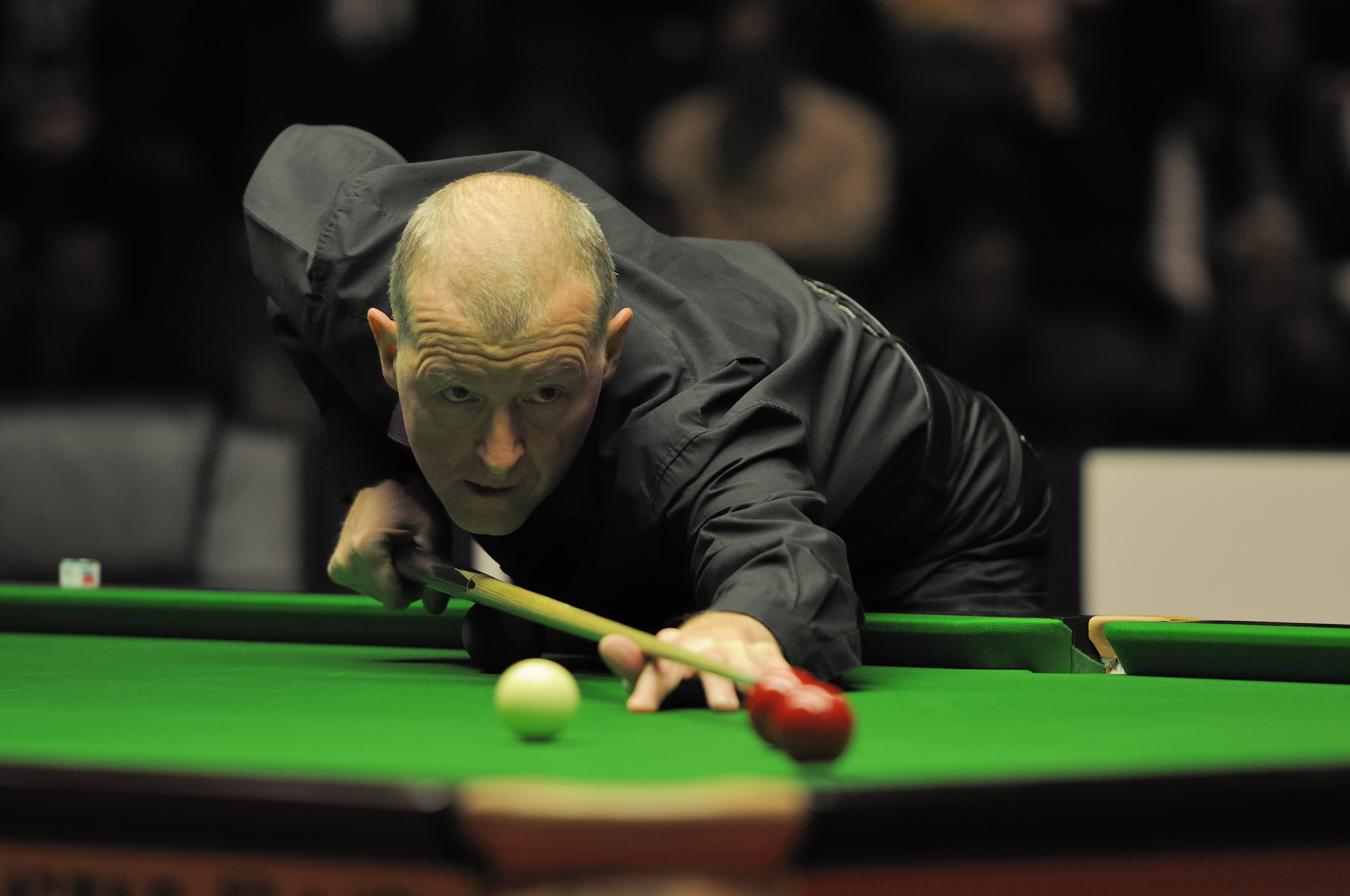
Davis playing a trick shot exhibition during the interval of the 2012 German Masters final

Davis began the 2011–12 season ranked world number 44, his lowest ranking position since turning professional. He reached the final of the 2011 World Seniors Championship, where he lost 1–2 to Darren Morgan. He participated in the 2011–12 Players Tour Championship; his best result was in the Warsaw Classic, where he reached the semi-finals before losing 3–4 to Ricky Walden, and finished at number 26 on the Order of Merit. He qualified for the 2011 UK Championship by defeating Ian McCulloch and Andrew Higginson, but lost 1–6 in the first round to O'Sullivan. He reached the last 16 of the Welsh Open, losing 0–4 to Murphy. Davis did not qualify for the main stage of the World Snooker Championship, losing 7–10 to Ben Woollaston.

He qualified for the 2012 Shanghai Masters, where he lost 4–5 to Walden; he then qualified for the final stages of the 2012 UK Championship, but lost in the first round 2–6 to Ali Carter. He again participated in the Players Tour Championship; his best results were in the Kay Suzanne Memorial Trophy and the Scottish Open, where he reached the last 16 before losing 3–4 to John Higgins and 1–4 to Ding Junhui. He placed 52nd on the tour's Order of Merit. He finished the season in the qualifying stage of the World Championship, losing 7–10 to Maflin. He won his first World Seniors Championship in 2013 by defeating Nigel Bond, 2–1. After being beaten by Craig Steadman 8–10 in the second round of the 2014 World Snooker Championship qualification, Davis finished the season outside the top 64 on the money list and dropped off the main professional tour after 36 years.

Davis received an invitational tour card for tournaments in the 2014–15 season. He played in the 2014 Champion of Champions event after qualifying with the 2013 World Seniors Championship, losing 1–4 to Mark Selby in the group semi-final. He entered the 2016 World Snooker Championship qualifiers but lost to Fergal O'Brien in his last professional match. During a live BBC broadcast on 17 April 2016, Davis announced his retirement from professional snooker, citing the recent death of his father as the main reason. He entered the Crucible Theatre holding the World Championship trophy and received a standing ovation from the audience. Over the course of his career, Davis won over £5.5 million in prize money. As of 2021, he continues to play exhibitions and is a pundit and commentator for the BBC's snooker coverage of Triple Crown events.

== Other sports ==
Davis playing a trick shot: potting a ball under a cloth

From 1994 to 2007, Davis regularly participated in professional nine-ball pool events; he was instrumental in creating the Mosconi Cup, an annual nine-ball pool tournament contested between teams representing Europe and the United States. He represented Europe in the tournament eleven times and was a member of the victorious 1995 and 2002 teams; his victory against the US's Earl Strickland clinched the 2002 competition for Europe. In 2001, Davis reached the final of his first pool event at the World Pool League before losing 9–5 to Efren Reyes. Sky Sports commentator Sid Waddell gave him the nickname "Romford Slim", calling him Britain's answer to American pool player Rudolf "Minnesota Fats" Wanderone. Davis dislikes blackball pool as played on English-style tables in British pubs and clubs, considering it a "Mickey Mouse game" when played with a smaller cue ball than the other balls, although he is happy with the game when played with uniform balls.

At the 2000 WPA World Nine-ball Championship, Davis was seeded 63rd. In the round of 64, he trailed second seed and reigning world champion Efren Reyes 2–8, but won the match 9–8. He defeated two other former world champions, Ralf Souquet 9–6 in the last 32 and Kunihiko Takahashi 11–6 in the last 16, but lost 7–11 in the quarter-finals to Corey Deuel.

He reached the last 16 of the 2003 WPA World Nine-ball Championship in Cardiff, Wales, where he faced three-time champion Strickland. The match was notable for the behaviour of its players. Strickland accused members of the crowd of bias towards Davis; when warned by referee Michaela Tabb, he told her to "shut up". He complained after Davis took a second toilet break (when only allocated one), and Davis later admitted that the second break was gamesmanship against his opponent. Strickland won the match and proceeded to the semi-finals.

Davis has become a proficient poker player, with successful appearances at televised tournaments; they included an appearance at the final table of the 2003 Poker Million with Jimmy White, who eventually won. He finished 579th at event 41 of the 2006 World Series of Poker, winning $20,617. At event 54 of the 2008 World Series of Poker, Davis finished 389th and won $28,950. He finished 131st, winning $5,491, at event 56 of the 2010 World Series of Poker. At event 22 of the 2011 Grand Poker Series, Davis finished eighth and won $2,049.

A keen chess player, he served as president of the British Chess Federation from 1996 until 2001. Davis co-authored Steve Davis Plays Chess, a 1995 book.

== In other media ==
Davis has become known for his coolness and conduct in high-pressure situations. His initial lack of emotional expression and monotonous interview style earned him a reputation as boring, and the satirical television series Spitting Image nicknamed him "Interesting". Davis has since played on this image and says it helped him gain public acceptance. He co-authored the 1988 book How to Be Really Interesting with Geoff Atkinson, a comedy writer who had been a key part of Spitting Image's writing team.

Davis worked with a series of video games. He appeared in a spoof online promotion for the Nintendo DS game World Snooker Championship: Season 2007–08, parodying a Nicole Kidman Brain Training advertisement, and worked with the World Snooker Championship franchise and Virtual Snooker. He also gave his name to two video games, Steve Davis Snooker in 1984 and Steve Davis World Snooker in 1989. In 2010, Davis played himself on The Increasingly Poor Decisions of Todd Margaret; other television appearances include the Christmas 1981 episode of The Morecambe & Wise Show.

Davis has published a number of other books. Five relate to snooker: Successful Snooker (1982), Frame and Fortune (1982), Steve Davis: Snooker Champion (1983), Matchroom Snooker (1988) and The Official Matchroom 1990 Snooker Special. He co-authored two chess books in 1995 with David Norwood: Steve Davis Plays Chess and Grandmaster Meets Chess Amateur. Davis wrote three 1994 cookbooks: Simply Fix – the Steve Davis Interesting Cookbook No 1 – Interesting Things to Do With Meat, Simply Fix – The Steve Davis Interesting Cookbook No 2 – Interesting Things to Make with Poultry, and Simply Fix – the Steve Davis Interesting Cookbook No 3 – Interesting Things to Make Using Vegetables. His third autobiography, Interesting, was published in 2015. Davis co-produced a music book with Kavus Torabi titled Medical Grade Music in 2021.

He participated in the thirteenth series of I'm a Celebrity...Get Me Out of Here! in 2013, finishing in eighth place. The Rack Pack, a 2016 BBC television film about professional snooker during the 1970s and 1980s focusing on Davis's rivalry with Alex Higgins, featured Will Merrick as Davis.

=== Music ===
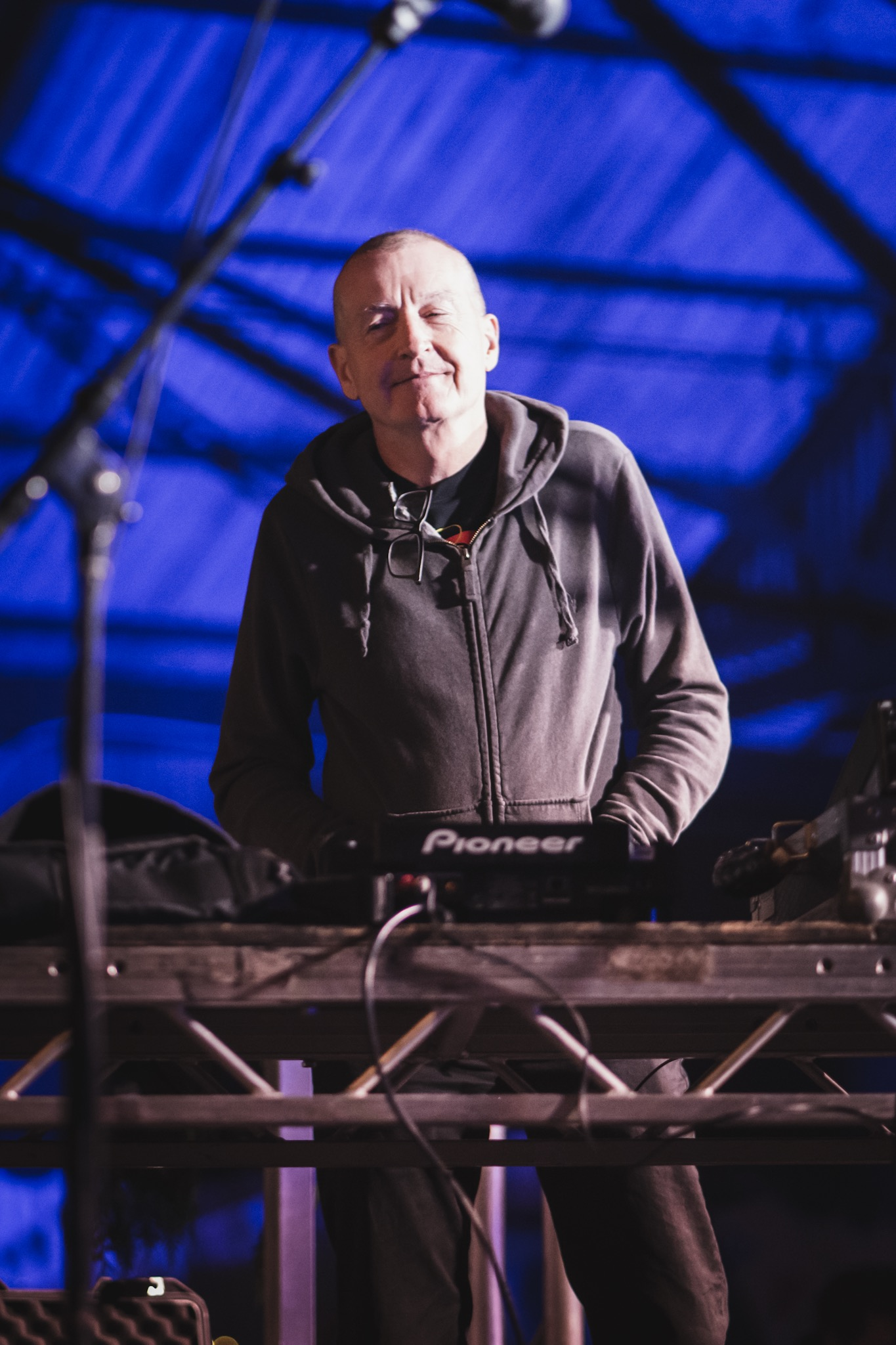
Davis performing at the Krankenhaus Festival at Muncaster Castle in 2019

When in the sixth form at school, Davis began listening to progressive rock and was introduced to the Canterbury scene. Interviewed in 2020, Davis said, "I loved what bands like Soft Machine and Henry Cow were doing – it was challenging and very complex." Regarding Robert Wyatt, he urged people to get Wyatt's Rock Bottom album, describing it as "an incredible record". Davis is a fan of French progressive rock band Magma and produced a London concert so he could see them, which led to their re-formation. He has an extensive record collection of mostly original vinyl copies.

He joined Chas & Dave and several other snooker stars (as the Matchroom Mob) on "Snooker Loopy", a 1986 novelty record which was a Top 10 hit in the UK Singles Chart. A year later they released "Romford Rap", a follow-up single which reached number 91 on the UK charts.

Davis joined Brentwood community radio station Phoenix FM in 1996, broadcasting a variety of soul and rock shows during the next ten years online and on FM under a restricted service licence. When the station went full-time on FM in March 2007, he hosted The Interesting Alternative Show. As a result of his broadcasts, Davis was a guest presenter on BBC Radio 6 Music in 2011. Davis adopted "Thunder Muscle" as his stage name – the energy drink brand from the television series The Increasingly Poor Decisions of Todd Margaret, where he played a fictional version of himself promoting the product. He also used the stage name "Rocky Flame". He branched out into club work in 2015 and has regular slots at London bars and nightclubs. Davis performed with Kavus Torabi at the 2016 Glastonbury Festival; their collaboration led to the formation of the Utopia Strong, an electronic music band whose debut album was released on 13 September 2019. In March 2023, Davis undertook a UK tour with the Utopia Strong in support of the Steve Hillage Band. He played analogue modular synthesiser on two free-form pieces each night totalling 30 mins.

In September 2021, Davis appeared in a music video for a track titled "Lily" from the Richard Dawson and Circle collaborative album.

== Legacy ==
Davis won a record 84 professional titles and was the runner-up in 38 events, with 28 of these as ranking event victories. (Note: Total amounts calculated from the Career finals section) His modern-era record of six world titles has been broken by both Stephen Hendry and Ronnie O'Sullivan, and his six UK Championship titles has been bettered only by O'Sullivan. Davis compiled 338 competitive centuries during his career. (Note: Some sources give a career total of 355.) He was coached by Frank Callan for much of his career, who also represented Hendry in the 1990s. In the 2005 book Masters of the Baize, a detailed comparison and ranking of snooker professionals, Luke Williams and Paul Gadsby rated Davis as the third-greatest snooker player of all time (behind Joe Davis and Hendry). In 2011, Davis was inducted into World Snooker's new Hall of Fame with seven other former world champions.

Davis was one of the first professional players to play in China, touring through the 1980s. This, along with highly lucrative off-table endorsements, both set up by Hearn, allowed him to become the United Kingdom's highest paid sportsperson in the later half of the 1980s. During the 2010 world championship, to mark the anniversary of the 1985 world championship final, Davis appeared with Taylor before the beginning of the first semi-final to stage a humorous re-enactment of their historic final frame; Taylor entered the arena wearing a pair of comically oversized glasses and Davis arrived sporting a red wig.

== Personal life and honours ==
In 1988, Davis became the only snooker player named as the BBC Sports Personality of the Year, and was made an MBE. He was made an OBE in 2000, and has been honorary president of the Snooker Writers' Association. Although he was on the board of Leyton Orient F.C., he has been a Charlton Athletic F.C. fan most of his life.

Davis married flight attendant Judith (née Greig) in 1990. They have two sons together, Greg (born in 1991) and Jack (born in 1993). In 1995, a British tabloid newspaper paid a 19-year-old dancer £32,000 to publish her allegations that Davis had had an extramarital affair with her. Davis and his wife divorced in 2005. At age 47, Davis began a relationship with 31-year-old accounts worker Jeannie Nash, who became his long-term partner. In 2012, Davis's son Greg entered Q-School with the aim of winning a place on the professional snooker tour, but failed to do so.

Davis is a patron of Feline Fine Foundation, a Bristol-based cat charity.

== Performance and rankings timeline ==
Performance and rankings timeline
Tournament	1978/ 79	1979/ 80	1980/ 81	1981/ 82	1982/ 83	1983/ 84	1984/ 85	1985/ 86	1986/ 87	1987/ 88	1988/ 89	1989/ 90	1990/ 91	1991/ 92	1992/ 93	1993/ 94	1994/ 95	1995/ 96	1996/ 97	1997/ 98	1998/ 99	1999/ 00	2000/ 01	2001/ 02	2002/ 03	2003/ 04	2004/ 05	2005/ 06	2006/ 07	2007/ 08	2008/ 09	2009/ 10	2010/ 11	2011/ 12	2012/ 13	2013/ 14	2014/ 15	2015/ 16
Ranking (Note: From the 2010/2011 season it shows the ranking at the beginning of the season.)	(Note: New players on the Main Tour do not have a ranking.)	18	13	2	4	1	1	1	1	1	1	1	2	2	4	4	2	2	10	13	14	15	17	21	25	11	13	15	11	15	29	23	22	44	51	51	(Note: Players issued an invitational tour card began the season without ranking points.)	108
References																																						
Ranking tournaments
Australian Goldfields Open (Note: The event ran under different names as Australian Masters (1979/1980 to 1987/1988 and 1995/1996), Hong Kong Open (1989/1990) and Australian Open (1994/1995).)	NH	Non-Ranking Event									NH	A	Tournament Not Held				NR		Tournament Not Held															WD	LQ	A	A	A
Shanghai Masters	Tournament Not Held																													2R	QF	LQ	1R	LQ	1R	LQ	WD	A
International Championship	Tournament Not Held																																		LQ	WR	A	A
UK Championship	Non-Ranking Event						W	W	W	W	SF	F	F	3R	SF	QF	2R	1R	3R	1R	QF	3R	2R	2R	3R	2R	3R	F	QF	1R	1R	1R	LQ	1R	1R	A	1R	A
German Masters (Note: The event ran under different name as German Open (1995/1996 to 1997/1998).)	Tournament Not Held																	2R	2R	1R	NR	Tournament Not Held											LQ	LQ	LQ	1R	LQ	A
Welsh Open	Tournament Not Held													A	3R	W	W	3R	1R	2R	QF	2R	LQ	1R	1R	F	2R	2R	SF	3R	1R	LQ	LQ	2R	LQ	1R	A	A
Players Championship Finals (Note: The event ran under different name as Players Tour Championship Grand Finals (2010/2011 to 2012/2013).)	Tournament Not Held																																DNQ	DNQ	DNQ	DNQ	DNQ	DNQ
China Open (Note: The event ran under different names as China International (1997/1998 and 1998/1999))	Tournament Not Held																			NR	2R	LQ	1R	2R	Not Held		2R	LQ	1R	1R	LQ	LQ	LQ	LQ	LQ	LQ	A	A
World Championship	1R	QF	W	1R	W	W	F	F	W	W	W	SF	SF	1R	2R	SF	1R	QF	2R	2R	1R	2R	LQ	LQ	1R	1R	QF	2R	1R	1R	1R	QF	LQ	LQ	LQ	LQ	LQ	LQ
Non-ranking tournaments
Six-red World Championship (Note: The event was called the Six-red Snooker International (2008/2009) and the Six-red World Grand Prix (2009/2010))	Tournament Not Held																														A	A	A	NH	2R	2R	A	A
Champion of Champions	A	NH	1R	Not Held																																A	1R	A
The Masters	A	A	1R	W	QF	QF	1R	SF	1R	W	SF	SF	1R	QF	QF	1R	1R	QF	W	SF	1R	1R	A	WR	1R	1R	QF	1R	1R	WR	A	A	A	A	A	A	A	A
Championship League	Not Held																													A	RR	RR	A	A	A	A	A	A
World Seniors Championship	Tournament Not Held													A	Tournament Not Held																		F	F	QF	W	QF	A
Shoot-Out	Tournament Not Held												2R	Tournament Not Held																			2R	1R	1R	1R	A	A
Former ranking tournaments
Canadian Masters (Note: The event run under different names as Canadian Open (1974/1975 to 1980/1981))	Non-Ranking			Tournament Not Held				Non-Ranking			F	Tournament Not Held																										
Classic	NH	Non-Ranking Event				W	SF	QF	W	W	1R	SF	3R	W	Tournament Not Held																							
Dubai Classic (Note: The event run under different names as Dubai Masters (1988/1989), Thailand Classic (1995/1996) and Asian Classic (1996/1997))	Tournament Not Held										NR	A	F	3R	1R	F	1R	2R	QF	Tournament Not Held																		
Malta Grand Prix	Tournament Not Held																Non-Ranking Event					2R	NR	Tournament Not Held														
Thailand Masters (Note: The event ran under different names such as Asian Open (1989/1990 to 1992/1993) and Thailand Open (1993/1994 to 1996/1997).)	Tournament Not Held					Non-Ranking Event				Not Held		A	1R	W	2R	F	2R	2R	2R	2R	QF	1R	LQ	1R	NR	Not Held			NR	Tournament Not Held								
Scottish Open (Note: The event ran under different names such as International Open (1981/1982 to 1984/1985, 1986/1987 to 1996/1997), Goya Matchroom Trophy (1985/1986) and Players Championship (2003/2004).)	Not Held			NR	QF	W	W	QF	QF	W	W	W	Not Held		F	QF	F	1R	2R	3R	1R	2R	2R	2R	2R	3R	Tournament Not Held								MR	Not Held		
British Open (Note: The event ran under different names such as British Gold Cup (1979/1980), Yamaha Organs Trophy (1980/1981) and International Masters (1981/1982 to 1983/1984).)	NH	Non-Ranking Event					SF	W	2R	1R	QF	3R	SF	SF	W	SF	QF	1R	SF	3R	3R	QF	3R	2R	2R	2R	2R	Tournament Not Held										
Irish Masters	Non-Ranking Event																								QF	1R	2R	NH	NR	Tournament Not Held								
Malta Cup (Note: The event ran under different names such as European Open (1988/1989 to 1996/1997 and 2001/2002 to 2003/2004) and Irish Open (1998/1999).)	Tournament Not Held										WD	SF	3R	QF	W	QF	2R	1R	1R	NH	1R	Not Held		A	1R	2R	QF	1R	1R	NR	Tournament Not Held							
Northern Ireland Trophy (Note: The tournament was known as Northern Ireland Classic (1981/1982))	Not Held			NR	Tournament Not Held																							NR	2R	3R	1R	Tournament Not Held						
World Open (Note: The event ran under different name as Professional Players Tournament (1982/1983 and 1983/1984), LG Cup (2001/2002 to 2003/2004), Grand Prix (1984/1985 to 2000/2001 and 2004/2005 to 2009/2010), the World Open (2010/2011) and the Haikou World Open (2011/2012–2013/2014).)	Tournament Not Held				WD	2R	SF	W	QF	3R	W	W	1R	F	QF	QF	QF	QF	3R	2R	1R	1R	2R	2R	SF	2R	3R	3R	RR	RR	QF	LQ	LQ	LQ	LQ	1R	Not Held	
Wuxi Classic (Note: The event ran under different name as Jiangsu Classic (2008/2009 to 2009/2010).)	Tournament Not Held																														Non-Ranking Event				LQ	1R	A	NH
Indian Open	Tournament Not Held																																			LQ	A	NH
Former non-ranking tournaments
Bombay International	A	SF	Tournament Not Held																																			
Scottish Open (Note: The event ran under different names such as International Open (1981/1982 to 1984/1985, 1986/1987 to 1996/1997), Matchroom Trophy (1985/1986) and Players Championship (2003/2004).)	Not Held			W	Ranking Event								Not Held		Ranking Event												Tournament Not Held								MR	Not Held		
Highland Masters	Not Held			SF	Tournament Not Held																																	
Pontins Professional	SF	SF	QF	W	A	A	A	A	A	A	A	A	A	A	A	A	A	A	A	A	A	A	Tournament Not Held															
Classic	NH	A	W	F	W	Ranking Event									Tournament Not Held																							
UK Championship	A	QF	W	W	QF	F	Ranking Event																															
Tolly Cobbold Classic	RR	A	A	W	W	W	Tournament Not Held																															
British Open	NH	A	W	W	2R	W	Ranking Event																						Tournament Not Held									
Singapore Masters	Tournament Not Held						F	W	Tournament Not Held																													
KitKat Break for World Champions	Tournament Not Held							F	Tournament Not Held																													
Belgian Classic	Tournament Not Held							QF	Tournament Not Held																													
English Professional Championship	Not Held		W	Not Held			W	SF	A	A	A	Tournament Not Held																										
Australian Goldfields Open	NH	A	A	A	W	A	A	A	F	A	NH	R	Not Held				Ranking		Tournament Not Held															Ranking Event				
Malaysian Masters	Tournament Not Held						RR	NH	SF	Tournament Not Held									A	Tournament Not Held																		
China Masters	Tournament Not Held							W	W	Tournament Not Held									A	Tournament Not Held																		
Tokyo Masters	Tournament Not Held									SF	Tournament Not Held																											
Canadian Masters	QF	QF	QF	Tournament Not Held				F	W	QF	R	Tournament Not Held																										
Dubai Classic	Tournament Not Held										F	Ranking Event								Tournament Not Held																		
Matchroom Professional Championship	Tournament Not Held								F	SF	W	Tournament Not Held																										
International League	Tournament Not Held											RR	Tournament Not Held																									
Norwich Union Grand Prix	Tournament Not Held										W	A	F	Tournament Not Held																								
Centenary Challenge	Tournament Not Held												F	Tournament Not Held																								
World Masters	Tournament Not Held												QF	Tournament Not Held																								
London Masters	Tournament Not Held										SF	QF	W	Tournament Not Held																								
European Masters League	Tournament Not Held													W	Tournament Not Held																							
European Challenge	Tournament Not Held													F	A	Tournament Not Held																						
Thailand Masters	Tournament Not Held					F	RR	RR	SF	Not Held		Ranking		W	Ranking Event										A	Not Held			A	Tournament Not Held								
Hong Kong Challenge (Note: The event was also called the Hong Kong Masters (1983/1984–1988/1989))	Tournament Not Held					SF	W	F	SF	W	QF	NH	SF	SF	Tournament Not Held																							
Indian Challenge	Tournament Not Held													SF	Tournament Not Held																							
Belgian Challenge	Tournament Not Held													W	Tournament Not Held																							
Indian Masters	Tournament Not Held														W	Tournament Not Held																						
Kent Classic (Note: The event was also called the Kent Cup (1986/1987–1987/1988 and 1989/1990–1990/1991))	Tournament Not Held								SF	A	A	A	A	NH	SF	Tournament Not Held																						
Belgian Masters	Tournament Not Held												SF	QF	1R	Not Held		A	Not Held																			
World Matchplay	Tournament Not Held										W	SF	SF	F	F	Not Held																						
Pot Black	RR	A	RR	W	W	QF	QF	1R	Tournament Not Held					W	1R	W	Tournament Not Held											A	A	A	Tournament Not Held							
Tenball	Tournament Not Held																QF	Tournament Not Held																				
Guangzhou Masters	Tournament Not Held																	F	Ranking Event																			
China Open	Tournament Not Held																			W	Ranking Event				Not Held		Ranking Event											
Super Challenge	Tournament Not Held																				W	Tournament Not Held																
Champions Super League	Tournament Not Held																				RR	Tournament Not Held																
German Masters	Tournament Not Held																	Ranking Event			1R	Not Held											Ranking Event					
Champions Cup (Note: The event ran under a different name as the Charity Challenge (1994/1995–1998/1999))	Tournament Not Held																QF	A	1R	QF	QF	RR	A	A	Tournament Not Held													
Scottish Masters	Not Held			SF	W	W	W	A	A	A	NH	SF	QF	F	SF	1R	SF	QF	1R	1R	1R	1R	1R	A	A	Tournament Not Held												
Irish Masters	A	A	A	F	W	W	SF	A	W	W	SF	W	W	QF	W	W	QF	F	QF	QF	QF	1R	QF	A	Ranking Event			NH	A	Tournament Not Held								
Northern Ireland Trophy	Not Held			F	Tournament Not Held																							WR	Ranking Event			Tournament Not Held						
Warsaw Snooker Tour	Tournament Not Held																													SF	Tournament Not Held							
World Series Warsaw	Tournament Not Held																														SF	Tournament Not Held						
Premier League (Note: The event was also called the Professional Snooker League (1983/1984), Matchroom League (1986/1987 to 1991/1992) and the European League (1992/1993 to 1996/1997))	Tournament Not Held					RR	Not Held		W	W	W	W	F	F	SF	RR	SF	F	RR	RR	RR	RR	RR	RR	RR	RR	RR	SF	SF	RR	RR	A	A	A	A	Not Held		
World Series Grand Final	Tournament Not Held																														QF	Tournament Not Held						

Performance table legend
LQ	lost in the qualifying draw	#R	lost in the early rounds of the tournament (WR = Wildcard round, RR = Round robin)	QF	lost in the quarter-finals
SF	lost in the semi–finals	F	lost in the final	W	won the tournament
DNQ	did not qualify for the tournament	A	did not participate in the tournament	WD	withdrew from the tournament

NH / Not Held	means an event was not held.
NR / Non-Ranking Event	means an event is/was no longer a ranking event.
R / Ranking Event	means an event is/was a ranking event.
MR / Minor-Ranking Event	means an event is/was a minor-ranking event.

== Career finals ==
=== Ranking finals: 41 (28 titles) ===
Legend
Legend
World Championship (6–2)
UK Championship (4–3)
Other Ranking (18–8)

Ranking event finals
Outcome	No.	Year	Championship	Opponent in the final	Score	Ref.
Winner	1.	1981	World Championship	(Wales) Doug Mountjoy	18–12	
Winner	2.	1983	World Championship (2)	(Canada) Cliff Thorburn	18–6	
Winner	3.	1983	International Open	(Canada) Cliff Thorburn	9–4	
Winner	4.	1984	The Classic	(England) Tony Meo	9–8	
Winner	5.	1984	World Championship (3)	(England) Jimmy White	18–16	
Winner	6.	1984	International Open (2)	(England) Tony Knowles	9–2	
Winner	7.	1984	UK Championship	(Northern Ireland) Alex Higgins	16–8	
Runner-up	1.	1985	World Championship	(Northern Ireland) Dennis Taylor	17–18	
Winner	8.	1985	Grand Prix	(Northern Ireland) Dennis Taylor	10–9	
Winner	9.	1985	UK Championship (2)	(England) Willie Thorne	16–14	
Winner	10.	1986	British Open	(England) Willie Thorne	12–7	
Runner-up	2.	1986	World Championship (2)	(England) Joe Johnson	12–18	
Winner	11.	1986	UK Championship (3)	(England) Neal Foulds	16–7	
Winner	12.	1987	The Classic (2)	(England) Jimmy White	13–12	
Winner	13.	1987	World Championship (4)	(England) Joe Johnson	18–14	
Winner	14.	1987	International Open (3)	(Canada) Cliff Thorburn	12–5	
Winner	15.	1987	UK Championship (4)	(England) Jimmy White	16–14	
Winner	16.	1988	The Classic (3)	(England) John Parrott	13–11	
Winner	17.	1988	World Championship (5)	(Wales) Terry Griffiths	18–11	
Winner	18.	1988	International Open (4)	(England) Jimmy White	12–6	
Runner-up	3.	1988	Canadian Masters	(England) Jimmy White	4–9	
Winner	19.	1988	Grand Prix (2)	(Northern Ireland) Alex Higgins	10–6	
Winner	20.	1989	World Championship (6)	(England) John Parrott	18–3	
Winner	21.	1989	International Open (5)	(Scotland) Stephen Hendry	9–4	
Winner	22.	1989	Grand Prix (3)	(England) Dean Reynolds	10–0	
Runner-up	4.	1989	UK Championship	(Scotland) Stephen Hendry	12–16	
Runner-up	5.	1990	Dubai Classic	(Scotland) Stephen Hendry	1–9	
Runner-up	6.	1990	UK Championship (2)	(Scotland) Stephen Hendry	15–16	
Runner-up	7.	1991	Grand Prix	(Scotland) Stephen Hendry	6–10	
Winner	23.	1992	The Classic (4)	(Scotland) Stephen Hendry	9–8	
Winner	24.	1992	Asian Open	(Scotland) Alan McManus	9–3	
Winner	25.	1993	European Open	(Scotland) Stephen Hendry	10–4	
Winner	26.	1993	British Open (2)	(Thailand) James Wattana	10–2	
Runner-up	8.	1993	Dubai Classic (2)	(Scotland) Stephen Hendry	3–9	
Runner-up	9.	1993	International Open	(Scotland) Stephen Hendry	6–10	
Runner-up	10.	1994	Thailand Open	(Thailand) James Wattana	7–9	
Winner	27.	1994	Welsh Open	(Scotland) Alan McManus	9–6	
Runner-up	11.	1995	International Open (2)	(Scotland) John Higgins	5–9	
Winner	28.	1995	Welsh Open (2)	(Scotland) John Higgins	9–3	
Runner-up	12.	2004	Welsh Open	(England) Ronnie O'Sullivan	8–9	
Runner-up	13.	2005	UK Championship (3)	(China) Ding Junhui	6–10	

=== Non-ranking finals: 77 (54 titles) ===
Legend
Legend
UK Championship (2–1)
The Masters (3–0)
Premier League (4–3)
Other (45–19)

Non-ranking finals
Outcome	No.	Year	Championship	Opponent in the final	Score	Ref.
Winner	1.	1980	UK Championship	(Northern Ireland) Alex Higgins	16–6	
Winner	2.	1980	The Classic	(Northern Ireland) Dennis Taylor	4–1	
Winner	3.	1981	Yamaha Organs Trophy	(England) David Taylor	9–6	
Winner	4.	1981	English Professional Championship	(England) Tony Meo	9–3	
Winner	5.	1981	International Open	(Northern Ireland) Dennis Taylor	9–0	
Runner-up	1.	1981	Northern Ireland Classic	(England) Jimmy White	9–11	
Winner	6.	1981	UK Championship (2)	(Wales) Terry Griffiths	16–3	
Winner	7.	1982	Pot Black	(Australia) Eddie Charlton	2–0	
Runner-up	2.	1982	The Classic	(Wales) Terry Griffiths	8–9	
Winner	8.	1982	The Masters	(Wales) Terry Griffiths	9–5	
Winner	9.	1982	Tolly Cobbold Classic	(Northern Ireland) Dennis Taylor	8–3	
Winner	10.	1982	International Masters (2)	(Wales) Terry Griffiths	9–7	
Runner-up	3.	1982	Irish Masters	(Wales) Terry Griffiths	5–9	
Winner	11.	1982	Pontins Professional	(Wales) Ray Reardon	9–4	
Winner	12.	1982	Australian Masters	(Australia) Eddie Charlton	254–100 (Note: Final decided on an aggregate score over three frames)	
Winner	13.	1982	Scottish Masters	(Northern Ireland) Alex Higgins	9–4	
Winner	14.	1983	Pot Black (2)	(Wales) Ray Reardon	2–0	
Winner	15.	1983	The Classic (2)	(Canada) Bill Werbeniuk	9–5	
Winner	16.	1983	Tolly Cobbold Classic (2)	(Wales) Terry Griffiths	7–5	
Winner	17.	1983	Irish Masters	(Wales) Ray Reardon	9–2	
Runner-up	4.	1983	Thailand Masters	(England) Tony Meo	1–2	
Winner	18.	1983	Scottish Masters (2)	(England) Tony Knowles	9–6	
Runner-up	5.	1983	UK Championship	(Northern Ireland) Alex Higgins	15–16	
Winner	19.	1984	Tolly Cobbold Classic (3)	(England) Tony Knowles	8–2	
Winner	20.	1984	International Masters (3)	(England) Dave Martin	RR (Note: Final was decided on a three-man round robin basis, the third person was John Dunning.)	
Winner	21.	1984	Irish Masters (2)	(Wales) Terry Griffiths	9–1	
Runner-up	6.	1984	Singapore Masters	(Wales) Terry Griffiths	RR	
Winner	22.	1984	Hong Kong Masters	(Wales) Doug Mountjoy	4–2	
Winner	23.	1984	Scottish Masters (3)	(England) Jimmy White	9–4	
Winner	24.	1985	English Professional Championship (2)	(England) Tony Knowles	9–2	
Winner	25.	1985	Singapore Masters	(Wales) Terry Griffiths	4–2	
Runner-up	7.	1985	Hong Kong Masters	(Wales) Terry Griffiths	2–4	
Winner	26.	1985	China Masters	(Northern Ireland) Dennis Taylor	2–1	
Runner-up	8.	1985	Canadian Masters	(Northern Ireland) Dennis Taylor	5–9	
Runner-up	9.	1985	Kit Kat Break for World Champions	(Northern Ireland) Dennis Taylor	5–9	
Runner-up	10.	1986	Australian Masters	(Northern Ireland) Dennis Taylor	2–3	
Winner	27.	1986	China Masters (2)	(Wales) Terry Griffiths	3–0	
Runner-up	11.	1986	Matchroom Professional Championship	(England) Willie Thorne	9–10	
Winner	28.	1986	Canadian Masters	(England) Willie Thorne	9–3	
Winner	29.	1987	Irish Masters (3)	(England) Willie Thorne	9–1	
Winner	30.	1987	Matchroom League	(England) Neal Foulds	RR	
Winner	31.	1987	Hong Kong Masters (2)	(Scotland) Stephen Hendry	9–3	
Winner	32.	1988	The Masters (2)	(England) Mike Hallett	9–0	
Winner	33.	1988	Irish Masters (4)	(England) Neal Foulds	9–4	
Winner	34.	1988	Matchroom League (2)	(Scotland) Stephen Hendry	RR	
Runner-up	12.	1988	Dubai Masters	(England) Neal Foulds	4–5	
Winner	35.	1988	Matchroom Professional Championship	(Northern Ireland) Dennis Taylor	10–7	
Winner	36.	1988	World Matchplay	(England) John Parrott	9–5	
Winner	37.	1988	Norwich Union Grand Prix	(England) Jimmy White	5–4	
Winner	38.	1989	Matchroom League (3)	(England) John Parrott	RR	
Winner	39.	1989	Hong Kong Gold Cup	(Northern Ireland) Alex Higgins	6–3	
Winner	40.	1990	Irish Masters (5)	(Northern Ireland) Dennis Taylor	9–4	
Winner	41.	1990	Matchroom League (4)	(Scotland) Stephen Hendry	RR	
Runner-up	13.	1990	Norwich Union Grand Prix	(England) John Parrott	2–4	
Runner-up	14.	1990	Centenary Challenge	(Scotland) Stephen Hendry	11–19 (Note: Aggregate score of three matches.)	
Winner	42.	1991	Irish Masters (6)	(England) John Parrott	9–5	
Winner	43.	1991	London Masters	(Scotland) Stephen Hendry	4–0	
Runner-up	15.	1991	Matchroom League	(Scotland) Stephen Hendry	RR	
Winner	44.	1991	European Masters League	(Thailand) James Wattana	RR	
Runner-up	16.	1991	European Challenge	(England) Jimmy White	1–4	
Winner	45.	1991	Pot Black (3)	(Scotland) Stephen Hendry	2–1	
Winner	46.	1991	Thailand Masters	(Scotland) Stephen Hendry	6–3	
Runner-up	17.	1991	Scottish Masters	(England) Mike Hallett	6–10	
Runner-up	18.	1991	World Matchplay	(England) Gary Wilkinson	11–18	
Winner	47.	1991	Belgian Challenge	(Scotland) Stephen Hendry	10–9	
Runner-up	19.	1992	Matchroom League (2)	(Scotland) Stephen Hendry	2–9	
Winner	48.	1992	Indian Masters	(England) Steve James	9–6	
Runner-up	20.	1992	World Matchplay (2)	(Thailand) James Wattana	4–9	
Winner	49.	1993	Irish Masters (7)	(Scotland) Alan McManus	9–4	
Winner	50.	1993	Pot Black (4)	(England) Mike Hallett	2–0	
Winner	51.	1994	Irish Masters (8)	(Scotland) Alan McManus	9–8	
Runner-up	21.	1996	Guangzhou Masters	(Malta) Tony Drago	2–6	
Runner-up	22.	1996	Irish Masters (2)	(Wales) Darren Morgan	8–9	
Runner-up	23.	1996	European League (3)	(Republic of Ireland) Ken Doherty	5–10	
Winner	52.	1997	The Masters (3)	(England) Ronnie O'Sullivan	10–8	
Winner	53.	1997	China International	(England) Jimmy White	7–4	
Winner	54.	1998	Red Bull Super Challenge	(Scotland) Stephen Hendry	RR	

=== Seniors finals: 4 (2 titles) ===
Seniors finals
Outcome	No.	Year	Championship	Opponent in the final	Score	Ref.
Runner-up	1.	2010	World Seniors Championship	(England) Jimmy White	1–4	
Runner-up	2.	2011	World Seniors Championship (2)	(Wales) Darren Morgan	1–2	
Winner	1.	2013	World Seniors Championship	(England) Nigel Bond	2–1	
Winner	2.	2018	Seniors Irish Masters	(England) Jonathan Bagley	4–0	

=== Team finals: 12 (10 titles) ===
Team finals
Outcome	No.	Year	Championship	Team/partner	Opponent(s) in the final	Score	Ref.
Winner	1.	1981	World Team Classic	England	Wales	4–3	
Runner-up	1.	1982	World Team Classic	England	Canada	2–4	
Winner	2.	1982	World Doubles Championship	(England) Tony Meo	(Wales) Terry Griffiths (Wales) Doug Mountjoy	13–2	
Winner	3.	1983	World Team Classic (2)	England	Wales	4–2	
Winner	4.	1983	World Doubles Championship (2)	(England) Tony Meo	(England) Jimmy White (England) Tony Knowles	10–2	
Runner-up	2.	1985	World Cup (2)	England	Ireland	7–9	
Winner	5.	1985	World Doubles Championship (3)	(England) Tony Meo	(Wales) Ray Reardon (England) Tony Jones	12–5	
Winner	6.	1986	World Doubles Championship (4)	(England) Tony Meo	(Scotland) Stephen Hendry (England) Mike Hallett	12–3	
Winner	7.	1988	World Cup (3)	England	Australia	9–7	
Winner	8.	1989	World Cup (4)	England	Rest of the World	9–8	
Winner	9.	1991	World Masters Mixed Doubles	(England) Allison Fisher	(England) Jimmy White (England) Caroline Walch	6–3	
Winner	10.	1991	World Mixed Doubles Championship	(England) Allison Fisher	(Scotland) Stephen Hendry (England) Stacey Hillyard	5–4	

=== Pro-am finals: 5 (5 titles) ===
Pro-Am finals
Outcome	No.	Year	Championship	Opponent in the final	Score	Ref.
Winner	1.	1978	Pontins Spring Open	(England) Tony Meo	7–6	
Winner	2.	1979	Pontins Spring Open (2)	(England) Jimmy White	7–4	
Winner	3.	1980	Warners Open	(England) Brian Watson	5–1	
Winner	4.	1981	Guinness World of Snooker Open	(England) Mike Darrington	6–4	
Winner	5.	1984	Isle of Wight Open	(Wales) Terry Griffiths	5–2	

=== Pool tournament wins ===
• Mosconi Cup (1995, 2002)
