= List of snooker tournaments =

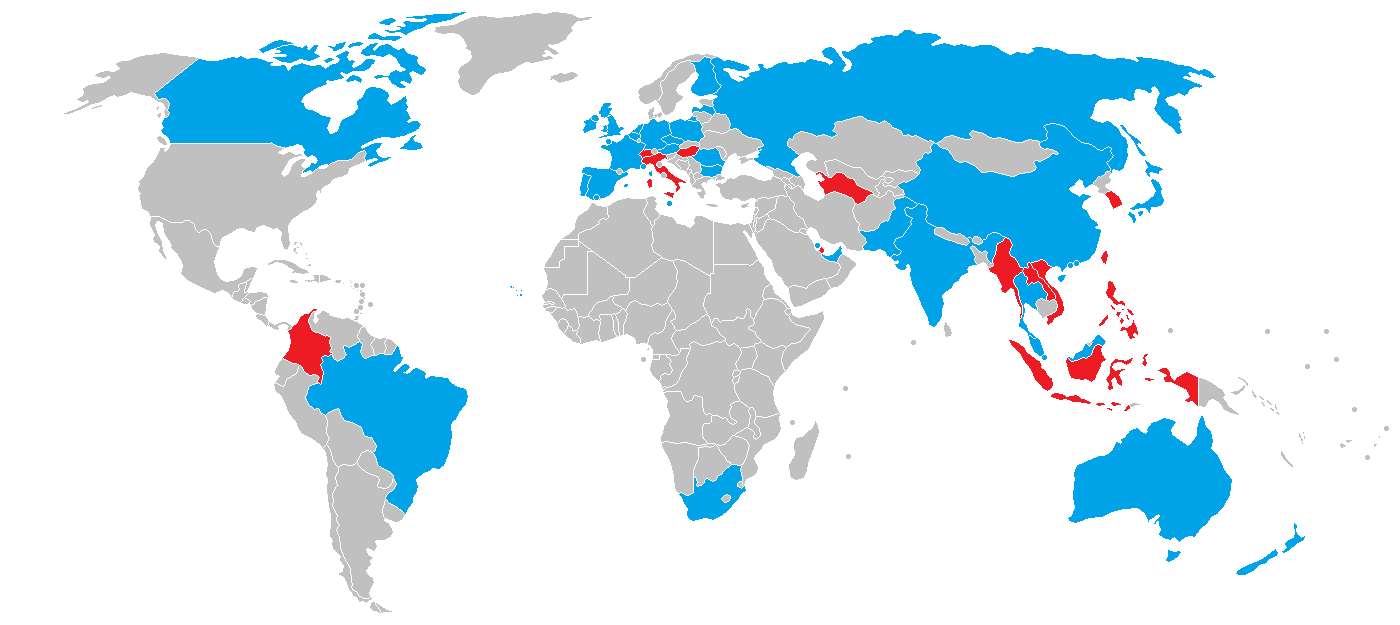
Blue-filled: nations that have hosted a professional snooker tournament. Red-filled: nations that have hosted a pro–am tournament but are yet to host a fully professional tournament.

This is a list of professional and alternative format snooker tournaments. Professional snooker tournaments can take the form of ranking tournaments—which are open to players on the World Snooker Tour and award ranking points based on a player's performance—and non-ranking tournaments. A non-ranking tournament may take the form of an invitational event where player participation is conditional on criteria set by the organiser or sponsor or by personal invitation. Most tournaments take the form of a 'singles' event, but there are several team formats that have appeared on the calendar over the years.

In recent seasons alternative forms of snooker have proliferated on the calendar. Any event that uses the official rules of snooker but is not completely consistent with them is defined as an "alternative form of snooker", such as six-red snooker (which is played with six reds as opposed to the standard fifteen as required by the official rules), and alterations to scoring and fouling. Some tournaments have occupied the middle ground between strict adherence to the official rules and adopting an alternative format by implementing tournament rules that fully complement the official rules of the game, such as adding a shot clock or call shot; in such instances, a tournament rule operates in a way that the official rules of the game are still fully observed.

== Current tournaments ==
=== Ranking ===
This is a list of ranking professional snooker tournaments.

| Tournament | Event | Format | Location |
|---|---|---|---|
| World Snooker Championship | 1927–1940 (BACC); 1946–1952 (BACC); 1952–1957 (World Professional Match-play Championship); 1964–1968 (BACC) (challenge basis); 1969–present (WPBSA) | Non-ranking; 1927–1973 | England; 1927–1928 (Camkin's Hall, Birmingham); 1929, 1931 (Lounge Hall, Nottingham); 1930, 1932, 1935–1940 (Thurston's Hall, London); 1933 (Joe Davis Saloon, Chesterfield); 1934 (Lounge Hall, Nottingham/Kettering); 1946 (Royal Horticultural Hall, London); 1947–1949, 1953 (Leicester Square Hall, London); 1950–1951, 1952, 1955–1956 (Tower Circus, Blackpool); 1952, 1954 (Houldsworth Hall, Manchester); 1964–1965 (Burroughes Hall, London); 1966 (St George's Hall, Liverpool); 1968 (Co-operative Hall, Bolton); 1968/69–1971/72 (various); 1972/73 (City Exhibition Hall, Manchester) |
| World Snooker Championship | 1927–1940 (BACC); 1946–1952 (BACC); 1952–1957 (World Professional Match-play Championship); 1964–1968 (BACC) (challenge basis); 1969–present (WPBSA) | Non-ranking; 1927–1973 | Jersey; 1957 (Saint Helier) |
| World Snooker Championship | 1927–1940 (BACC); 1946–1952 (BACC); 1952–1957 (World Professional Match-play Championship); 1964–1968 (BACC) (challenge basis); 1969–present (WPBSA) | Non-ranking; 1927–1973 | South Africa; 1965 (various) |
| World Snooker Championship | 1927–1940 (BACC); 1946–1952 (BACC); 1952–1957 (World Professional Match-play Championship); 1964–1968 (BACC) (challenge basis); 1969–present (WPBSA) | Non-ranking; 1927–1973 | Australia; 1970 (1971 event, various) |
| World Snooker Championship | 1927–1940 (BACC); 1946–1952 (BACC); 1952–1957 (World Professional Match-play Championship); 1964–1968 (BACC) (challenge basis); 1969–present (WPBSA) | Ranking; 1974–present | England; 1973/74 (Belle Vue, Manchester); 1975/76 (Town Hall, Middlesbrough / Wythenshawe Forum, Manchester); 1976/77–present (Crucible Theatre, Sheffield) |
| World Snooker Championship | 1927–1940 (BACC); 1946–1952 (BACC); 1952–1957 (World Professional Match-play Championship); 1964–1968 (BACC) (challenge basis); 1969–present (WPBSA) | Ranking; 1974–present | Australia; 1975 (various) |
| UK Championship | 1977/78–present | Invitational; 1977/78–1983/84 | England; 1977/78 (Tower Circus, Blackpool); 1978/79–1997/98 (Guild Hall, Preston); 1998/99–2000/01 (International Centre, Bournemouth); 2001/02–2006/07 (Barbican Centre, York); 2007/08–2010/11 (International Centre, Telford); 2011/12–2019/20 (Barbican Centre, York); 2020/21 (Marshall Arena, Milton Keynes); 2021/22 (Barbican Centre, York) |
| UK Championship | 1977/78–present | Ranking; 1984/85–present | England; 1977/78 (Tower Circus, Blackpool); 1978/79–1997/98 (Guild Hall, Preston); 1998/99–2000/01 (International Centre, Bournemouth); 2001/02–2006/07 (Barbican Centre, York); 2007/08–2010/11 (International Centre, Telford); 2011/12–2019/20 (Barbican Centre, York); 2020/21 (Marshall Arena, Milton Keynes); 2021/22 (Barbican Centre, York) |
| British Open | British Gold Cup; 1979/80 | Invitational | England; 1979/80–1992/93 (Assembly Rooms, Derby); 1993/94–2000/01 (Plymouth Pavilions, Plymouth); 2001/02 (Telewest Arena, Newcastle-upon-Tyne); 2002/03 (International Centre, Telford); 2003/04–2004/05 (Brighton Centre, Brighton); 2021/22 (Morningside Arena, Leicester); 2022/23 (Marshall Arena, Milton Keynes); 2023/24 (The Centaur, Cheltenham) |
| British Open | Yamaha Organs Trophy; 1980/81 | Invitational | England; 1979/80–1992/93 (Assembly Rooms, Derby); 1993/94–2000/01 (Plymouth Pavilions, Plymouth); 2001/02 (Telewest Arena, Newcastle-upon-Tyne); 2002/03 (International Centre, Telford); 2003/04–2004/05 (Brighton Centre, Brighton); 2021/22 (Morningside Arena, Leicester); 2022/23 (Marshall Arena, Milton Keynes); 2023/24 (The Centaur, Cheltenham) |
| British Open | International Masters; 1981/82–1983/84 | Invitational | England; 1979/80–1992/93 (Assembly Rooms, Derby); 1993/94–2000/01 (Plymouth Pavilions, Plymouth); 2001/02 (Telewest Arena, Newcastle-upon-Tyne); 2002/03 (International Centre, Telford); 2003/04–2004/05 (Brighton Centre, Brighton); 2021/22 (Morningside Arena, Leicester); 2022/23 (Marshall Arena, Milton Keynes); 2023/24 (The Centaur, Cheltenham) |
| British Open | British Open; 1984/85–2004/05, 2021/22–present | Ranking | England; 1979/80–1992/93 (Assembly Rooms, Derby); 1993/94–2000/01 (Plymouth Pavilions, Plymouth); 2001/02 (Telewest Arena, Newcastle-upon-Tyne); 2002/03 (International Centre, Telford); 2003/04–2004/05 (Brighton Centre, Brighton); 2021/22 (Morningside Arena, Leicester); 2022/23 (Marshall Arena, Milton Keynes); 2023/24 (The Centaur, Cheltenham) |
| World Open | Professional Players Tournament; 1982/83–1983/84 | Ranking | England; 1982/83 (La Reserve International Snooker Club, Birmingham); 1983/84 (Redwood Lodge, Bristol); 1984/85–1993/94 (The Hexagon, Reading); 1994/95 (Assembly Rooms, Derby); 1995/96 (Crowtree Centre, Sunderland); 1996/97–1997/98 (International Centre, Bournemouth); 1998/99–1999/00 (Guild Hall, Preston); 2000/01 (International Centre, Telford); 2001/02–2003/04 (Guild Hall, Preston) |
| World Open | Grand Prix; 1984/85–2000/01 | Ranking | England; 1982/83 (La Reserve International Snooker Club, Birmingham); 1983/84 (Redwood Lodge, Bristol); 1984/85–1993/94 (The Hexagon, Reading); 1994/95 (Assembly Rooms, Derby); 1995/96 (Crowtree Centre, Sunderland); 1996/97–1997/98 (International Centre, Bournemouth); 1998/99–1999/00 (Guild Hall, Preston); 2000/01 (International Centre, Telford); 2001/02–2003/04 (Guild Hall, Preston) |
| World Open | LG Cup; 2001/02–2003/04 | Ranking | England; 1982/83 (La Reserve International Snooker Club, Birmingham); 1983/84 (Redwood Lodge, Bristol); 1984/85–1993/94 (The Hexagon, Reading); 1994/95 (Assembly Rooms, Derby); 1995/96 (Crowtree Centre, Sunderland); 1996/97–1997/98 (International Centre, Bournemouth); 1998/99–1999/00 (Guild Hall, Preston); 2000/01 (International Centre, Telford); 2001/02–2003/04 (Guild Hall, Preston) |
| World Open | Grand Prix; 2004/05–2009/10 | Ranking | England; 2004/05–2005/06 (Guild Hall, Preston) |
| World Open | Grand Prix; 2004/05–2009/10 | Ranking | Scotland; 2006/07–2007/08 (AECC, Aberdeen); 2008/09 (SECC, Glasgow); 2009/10 (Kelvin Hall, Glasgow) |
| World Open | World Open; 2010/11–2013/14, 2016/17–2019/20 | Ranking | Scotland; 2010/11 (SECC, Glasgow) |
| World Open | World Open; 2010/11–2013/14, 2016/17–2019/20 | Ranking | China; 2011/12 (Haikou Stadium, Haikou); 2012/13–2013/14 (International Exhibition Center, Haikou); 2016/17–2018/19 (No.1 Middle School, Yushan); 2019/20 (Yushan Sport Centre, Yushan) |
| Scottish Open | International Open; 1986/87–1989/90; 1992/93–1996/97 | Ranking | England; 1986/87–1989/90 (Trentham Gardens, Stoke-on-Trent); 1992/93 (Plymouth Pavilions, Plymouth); 1993/94–1994/95 (International Centre, Bournemouth); 1995/96 (Link Centre, Swindon) |
| Scottish Open | International Open; 1986/87–1989/90; 1992/93–1996/97 | Ranking | Scotland; 1996/97 (AECC, Aberdeen) |
| Scottish Open | Scottish Open; 1997/98–2002/03 | Ranking | Scotland; 1997/98–2001/02 (AECC, Aberdeen); 2002/03 (Royal Highland Centre, Edinburgh); 2003/04 (SECC, Glasgow) |
| Scottish Open | Players Championship; 2003/04 | Ranking | Scotland; 1997/98–2001/02 (AECC, Aberdeen); 2002/03 (Royal Highland Centre, Edinburgh); 2003/04 (SECC, Glasgow) |
| Scottish Open | Scottish Open; 2012/13, 2016/17–present | Minor-ranking; 2012/13 | Scotland (Regional Sports Facility, Ravenscraig) |
| Scottish Open | Scottish Open; 2012/13, 2016/17–present | Ranking; 2016/17–present | Scotland; 2016/17–2019/20 (Commonwealth Arena, Glasgow) |
| Scottish Open | Scottish Open; 2012/13, 2016/17–present | Ranking; 2016/17–present | England; 2020/21 (Marshall Arena, Milton Keynes) |
| Scottish Open | Scottish Open; 2012/13, 2016/17–present | Ranking; 2016/17–present | Wales; 2021/22 (Venue Cymru, Llandudno) |
| European Masters | European Open; 1988/89–1996/97 | Ranking | France; 1988/89 (Casino de Deauville, Deauville); 1989/90 (Palais des Sports, Lyon) |
| European Masters | European Open; 1988/89–1996/97 | Ranking | The Netherlands; 1990/91 (Imax Centre, Rotterdam) |
| European Masters | European Open; 1988/89–1996/97 | Ranking | Belgium; 1991/92 (Tongeren Snooker Centre, Tongeren); 1992/93–1993/94 (Arenahal, Antwerp); 1994/95 (Schijnpoort Arena, Antwerp) |
| European Masters | European Open; 1988/89–1996/97 | Ranking | Malta; 1995/96–1996/97 (Mediterranean Conference Centre, Valletta) |
| European Masters | Irish Open; 1998/99 | Ranking | Republic of Ireland (National Basketball Arena, Dublin) |
| European Masters | European Open; 2001/02–2003/04 | Ranking | Malta; 2001/02 (Mediterranean Conference Centre, Valletta); 2003/04 (Hilton Conference Centre, Portomaso) |
| European Masters | European Open; 2001/02–2003/04 | Ranking | England; 2002/03 (Palace Hotel, Torquay) |
| European Masters | Malta Cup; 2004/05–2007/08 | Ranking; 2004/05–2006/07 | Malta (Hilton Conference Centre, Portomaso) |
| European Masters | Malta Cup; 2004/05–2007/08 | Invitational; 2007/08 | Malta (Hilton Conference Centre, Portomaso) |
| European Masters | European Masters; 2016/17–present | Ranking | |
| European Masters | European Masters; 2016/17–present | Ranking | Romania; 2016/17 (Globus Circus, Bucharest) |
| European Masters | European Masters; 2016/17–present | Ranking | Belgium; 2017/18–2018/19 (De Soeverein, Lommel) |
| European Masters | European Masters; 2016/17–present | Ranking | Austria; 2019/20 (Messe Dornbirn, Dornbirn) |
| European Masters | European Masters; 2016/17–present | Ranking | England; 2020/21–2021/22 (Marshall Arena, Milton Keynes) |
| European Masters | European Masters; 2016/17–present | Ranking | Germany; 2022/23 (Stadthalle, Fürth); 2023/24 (Kia Metropol Arena, Nuremberg) |
| Shoot Out | 1990/91, 2010/11–present | Invitational (professional rules); 1990/91 | England (Trentham Gardens, Stoke-on-Trent) |
| Shoot Out | 1990/91, 2010/11–present | Invitational (alternative rules); 2010/11–2015/16 | England; 2010/11–2014/15 (Blackpool Tower, Blackpool); 2015/16 (The Hexagon, Reading) |
| Shoot Out | 1990/91, 2010/11–present | Ranking (alternative rules); 2016/17–present | England; 2016/17–2019/20 (Watford Colosseum, Watford); 2020/21 (Marshall Arena, Milton Keynes); 2021/22 (Morningside Arena, Leicester) |
| Welsh Open | 1991/92–present | Ranking | Wales; 1991/92–1997/98 (Newport Centre, Newport); 1998/99–2002/03 (International Arena, Cardiff); 2003/04 (Welsh Institute of Sport, Cardiff); 2004/05–2013/14 (Newport Centre, Newport); 2014/15–2019/20 (Motorpoint Arena, Cardiff); 2020/21–present (Celtic Manor Resort, Newport) |
| German Masters | German Open; 1995/96–1997/98 | Ranking | Germany; 1995/96 (Messe Frankfurt, Frankfurt); 1996/97 (Roberts Barracks, Osnabrück); 1997/98–1998/99 (Atlantis Rheinhotel, Bingen am Rhein); 2010/11–present (Tempodrom, Berlin) |
| German Masters | German Masters; 1998/99; 2010/11–present | Invitational; 1998/99 | Germany; 1995/96 (Messe Frankfurt, Frankfurt); 1996/97 (Roberts Barracks, Osnabrück); 1997/98–1998/99 (Atlantis Rheinhotel, Bingen am Rhein); 2010/11–present (Tempodrom, Berlin) |
| German Masters | German Masters; 1998/99; 2010/11–present | Ranking; 2010/11–present | |
| German Masters | German Masters; 1998/99; 2010/11–present | Ranking; 2010/11–present | Germany; 2010/11–2019/20 (Tempodrom, Berlin); 2021/22 (Tempodrom, Berlin) |
| German Masters | German Masters; 1998/99; 2010/11–present | Ranking; 2010/11–present | England; 2020/21 (Marshall Arena, Milton Keynes) |
| Championship League | 2007/08–present | Invitational; 2007/08–2019/20 | England; 2007/08–2015/16 (Crondon Park Golf Club, Stock); 2016/17–2018/19 (Ricoh Arena, Coventry); 2018/19 (Barnsley Metrodome, Barnsley); 2019/20 (Morningside Arena, Leicester); 2019/20–2020/21 (Marshall Arena, Milton Keynes); 2021/22–2023/24 (Morningside Arena, Leicester) |
| Championship League | 2007/08–present | Ranking; 2020/21–present | England; 2007/08–2015/16 (Crondon Park Golf Club, Stock); 2016/17–2018/19 (Ricoh Arena, Coventry); 2018/19 (Barnsley Metrodome, Barnsley); 2019/20 (Morningside Arena, Leicester); 2019/20–2020/21 (Marshall Arena, Milton Keynes); 2021/22–2023/24 (Morningside Arena, Leicester) |
| Players Championship | Players Tour Championship Grand Finals; 2010/11–2012/13 | Ranking | Republic of Ireland; 2010/11 (The Helix, Dublin); 2011/12–2012/13 (Bailey Allen Hall, Galway) |
| Players Championship | Players Championship Grand Final; 2013/14–2015/16 | Ranking | England; 2013/14 (Guild Hall, Preston); 2015/16 (EventCity, Manchester) |
| Players Championship | Players Championship Grand Final; 2013/14–2015/16 | Ranking | Thailand; 2014/15 (Montien Riverside Hotel, Bangkok) |
| Players Championship | Players Championship; 2016/17–present | Ranking | Wales; 2016/17–2017/18 (Venue Cymru, Llandudno) |
| Players Championship | Players Championship; 2016/17–present | Ranking | England; 2018/19 (Guild Hall, Preston); 2019/20 (Theatre and Convention Centre, Southport); 2020/21 (Marshall Arena, Milton Keynes); 2021/22 (Aldersley Leisure Village, Wolverhampton) |
| International Championship | 2012/13, 2019/20–present | Ranking | China; 2012/13 (Sichuan International Tennis Center, Chengdu); 2013/14 (Chengdu Eastern Music Park, Chengdu); 2014/15 (Sichuan International Tennis Center, Chengdu); 2015/16–2019/20 (Baihu Media Broadcasting Centre, Daqing) |
| World Grand Prix | 2014/15–present | Invitational; 2014/15 | Wales; 2014/15–2015/16 (Venue Cymru, Llandudno) |
| World Grand Prix | 2014/15–present | Ranking; 2015/16–present | England; 2016/17–2017/18 (Guild Hall, Preston); 2018/19–2019/20 (Cheltenham Racecourse, Cheltenham); 2020/21 (Marshall Arena, Milton Keynes); 2021/22 (Coventry Building Society Arena, Coventry) |
| Gibraltar Open | 2015/16–present | Minor-ranking; 2015/16 | Gibraltar (Tercentenary Sports Hall) |
| Gibraltar Open | 2015/16–present | Ranking; 2016/17–present | |
| Gibraltar Open | 2015/16–present | Ranking; 2016/17–present | Gibraltar; 2016/17–2018/19 (Tercentenary Sports Hall); 2019/20 (Europa Point Sports Complex); 2021/22 (TBC) |
| Gibraltar Open | 2015/16–present | Ranking; 2016/17–present | England; 2020/21 (Marshall Arena, Milton Keynes) |
| English Open | 2016/17–present | Ranking | England; 2016/17 (EventCity, Manchester); 2017/18 (Barnsley Metrodome, Barnsley); 2018/19–2019/20 (K2 Leisure Centre, Crawley); 2020/21–2021/22 (Marshall Arena, Milton Keynes); 2022/23–present (Brentwood Centre, Brentwood) |
| Northern Ireland Open | 2016/17–present | Ranking | Northern Ireland; 2016/17 (Titanic Belfast, Belfast); 2017/18–2019/20 (Waterfront Hall, Belfast); 2021/22 (Waterfront Hall, Belfast) |
| Northern Ireland Open | 2016/17–present | Ranking | England; 2020/21 (Marshall Arena, Milton Keynes) |
| Tour Championship | 2018/19–present | Ranking | Wales; 2018/19 (Venue Cymru, Llandudno); 2021/22 (Venue Cymru, Llandudno) |
| Tour Championship | 2018/19–present | Ranking | England; 2019/20 (Marshall Arena, Milton Keynes) |
| Xi'an Grand Prix | 2024/25 | Ranking | China (Qujiang E-sports Centre, Xi'an) |
| Saudi Arabia Snooker Masters | 2024/25 | Ranking | Saudi Arabia (The Green Halls, Riyadh) |

=== Non-ranking ===
The professional snooker tournaments listed below are non-ranking and invitational events.

| Tournament | Event | Format | Location |
|---|---|---|---|
| Masters | 1975–present | Invitational | England; 1974/75 (West Centre Hotel, London); 1975/76–1977/78 (New London Theatre, London); 1978/79–2005/06 (Wembley Conference Centre, London); 2006/07–2010/11 (Wembley Arena, London); 2011/12–present (Alexandra Palace, London) |
| Champion of Champions | 1978/79, 1980/81; 2013/14–present | Invitational | England; 1978/79 (Wembley Conference Centre, London); 1980/81 (New London Theatre, London); 2013/14–2019/20 (Ricoh Arena, Coventry); 2020/21 (Marshall Arena, Milton Keynes); 2021/22 (Bolton Whites Hotel, Bolton) |
| World Cup | World Challenge Cup; 1979/80–1980/81 | Invitational | England; 1979/80 (Haden Hill Leisure Centre, Birmingham); 1980/81 (New London Theatre, London); 1981/82–1983/84 (The Hexagon, Reading) |
| World Cup | World Team Classic; 1981/82–1983/84 | Invitational | England; 1979/80 (Haden Hill Leisure Centre, Birmingham); 1980/81 (New London Theatre, London); 1981/82–1983/84 (The Hexagon, Reading) |
| World Cup | World Cup; 1984/85–1989/90; 1996/97; 2011/12; 2015/16–present | Invitational | England; 1984/85–1989/90 (International Centre, Bournemouth) |
| World Cup | World Cup; 1984/85–1989/90; 1996/97; 2011/12; 2015/16–present | Invitational | Thailand; 1996/97 (Armari Watergate Hotel, Bangkok; 2011/12 (Bangkok Convention Centre, Bangkok) |
| World Cup | World Cup; 1984/85–1989/90; 1996/97; 2011/12; 2015/16–present | Invitational | China; 2015/16–present (Wuxi City Sports Park Stadium, Wuxi) |
| World Seniors Championship | 1991/92, 2010/11 | Non-ranking (professional rules) | England; 1991/92 (Trentham Gardens, Stoke-on-Trent); 2010/11 (Cedar Court Hotel, Bradford); 2011/12 (East of England Showground, Peterborough); 2012/13–2013/14 (Mountbatten Centre, Portsmouth); 2014/15 (Blackpool Tower, Blackpool); 2015/16 (Guild Hall, Preston); 2016/17–2017/18 (Baths Hall, Scunthorpe); 2019/20–present (Crucible Theatre, Sheffield) |
| World Seniors Championship | 2011/12 | Non-ranking (alternative rules) | England; 1991/92 (Trentham Gardens, Stoke-on-Trent); 2010/11 (Cedar Court Hotel, Bradford); 2011/12 (East of England Showground, Peterborough); 2012/13–2013/14 (Mountbatten Centre, Portsmouth); 2014/15 (Blackpool Tower, Blackpool); 2015/16 (Guild Hall, Preston); 2016/17–2017/18 (Baths Hall, Scunthorpe); 2019/20–present (Crucible Theatre, Sheffield) |
| World Seniors Championship | 2012/13–present | Non-ranking (professional rules) | England; 1991/92 (Trentham Gardens, Stoke-on-Trent); 2010/11 (Cedar Court Hotel, Bradford); 2011/12 (East of England Showground, Peterborough); 2012/13–2013/14 (Mountbatten Centre, Portsmouth); 2014/15 (Blackpool Tower, Blackpool); 2015/16 (Guild Hall, Preston); 2016/17–2017/18 (Baths Hall, Scunthorpe); 2019/20–present (Crucible Theatre, Sheffield) |
| UK Seniors Championship | 2017/18–present | Non-ranking | England; 2017/18 (Harlequin Theatre, Redhill); 2018/19–2019/20 (Bonus Arena, Hull); 2021/22 (Bonus Arena, Hull) |
| Seniors Irish Masters | 2017/18–2018/19, 2021/22 | Invitational | Republic of Ireland (Goffs, Kill) |
| Seniors Masters | 2017/18–2018/19, 2021/22 | Invitational | England; 2017/18–2018/19 (Crucible Theatre, Sheffield); 2021/22 (Alexandra Palace, London) |
| Shanghai Masters | 2007/08–2019/20, 2023/24 | Ranking; 2007/08–2017/18 | China; 2007/08–2017/18, 2023/24 (Shanghai Grand Stage, Shanghai); 2018/19–2019/20 (Regal International East Asia Hotel, Shanghai) |
| Shanghai Masters | 2007/08–2019/20, 2023/24 | Non-ranking; 2018/19–2019/20, 2023/24 | China; 2007/08–2017/18, 2023/24 (Shanghai Grand Stage, Shanghai); 2018/19–2019/20 (Regal International East Asia Hotel, Shanghai) |
| World Masters of Snooker | 2023/24 | Invitational | Boulevard City, Riyadh |

=== Pro-am ===
| Tournament | Event | Format | Location |
|---|---|---|---|
| World Games | 2001/02–present | Pro–am | Japan; 2001 (Selion Plaza, Akita) |
| World Games | 2001/02–present | Pro–am | Germany; 2005 (Saalbau Bottrop, Duisburg) |
| World Games | 2001/02–present | Pro–am | Taiwan; 2009 (Chung Cheng Martial Arts Stadium, Kaohsiung) |
| World Games | 2001/02–present | Pro–am | Colombia; 2013 (Unidad Deportiva Alberto Galindo, Cali) |
| World Games | 2001/02–present | Pro–am | Poland; 2017 (Wroclaw Congress Center, Wrocław) |
| Southeast Asian Games | 2005/06–present | Pro–am | Philippines; 2005 (Makati Coliseum, Makati); 2019 (Manila Hotel, Manila) |
| Southeast Asian Games | 2005/06–present | Pro–am | Thailand; 2007 (Sima Thani Hotel Grand Ballroom, Nakhon Ratchasima) |
| Southeast Asian Games | 2005/06–present | Pro–am | Laos; 2009 (Don Chan Palace, Vientiane) |
| Southeast Asian Games | 2005/06–present | Pro–am | Indonesia; 2011 (Jakabaring Billiard Arena, Palembang) |
| Southeast Asian Games | 2005/06–present | Pro–am | Myanmar; 2013 (Wunna Theikdi Billiard & Snooker Indoor Stadium, Naypyidaw) |
| Southeast Asian Games | 2005/06–present | Pro–am | Singapore; 2015 (OCBC Arena Hall 4, Kallang) |
| Southeast Asian Games | 2005/06–present | Pro–am | Malaysia; 2017 (Kuala Lumpur Convention Centre, Kuala Lumpur) |
| Asian Indoor and Martial Arts Games | Asian Indoor Games; 2007/08–2009/10 | Pro–am | Macau; 2007 (Macau East Asian Games Dome, Macau) |
| Asian Indoor and Martial Arts Games | Asian Indoor Games; 2007/08–2009/10 | Pro–am | Vietnam; 2009 (Phan Đình Phùng Gymnasium, Ho Chi Minh City) |
| Asian Indoor and Martial Arts Games | Asian Indoor and Martial Arts Games; 2013/14–present | Pro–am | South Korea; 2013 (Songdo Convensia, Incheon) |
| Asian Indoor and Martial Arts Games | Asian Indoor and Martial Arts Games; 2013/14–present | Pro–am | Turkmenistan; 2017 (Ashgabat Billiard Sports Arena, Ashgabat) |
| Pink Ribbon | 2010/11–2019/20, 2024-present | Pro–am | England (The Capital Venue, Gloucester) |
| Vienna Snooker Open | 2010/11, 2012/13–2019/20, 2023-present | Pro–am | Austria (15 Reds Köö Wien Snooker Club, Vienna) |

== Withdrawn tournaments ==
=== Ranking ===
This is a list of ranking professional snooker tournaments that no longer form part of the snooker calendar.

| Tournament | Event | Format | Location |
|---|---|---|---|
| Canadian Masters | Canadian Open; 1974/75–1980/81 | Invitational | Canada; 1974/75–1980/81 (Canadian National Exhibition Stadium, Toronto); 1985/86–1987/88 (CBC Television Studios, Toronto); 1988/89 (Minkler Auditorium, Toronto) |
| Canadian Masters | Canadian Masters; 1985/86–1988/89 | Invitational; 1985/86–1987/88 | Canada; 1974/75–1980/81 (Canadian National Exhibition Stadium, Toronto); 1985/86–1987/88 (CBC Television Studios, Toronto); 1988/89 (Minkler Auditorium, Toronto) |
| Canadian Masters | Canadian Masters; 1985/86–1988/89 | Ranking; 1988/89 | Canada; 1974/75–1980/81 (Canadian National Exhibition Stadium, Toronto); 1985/86–1987/88 (CBC Television Studios, Toronto); 1988/89 (Minkler Auditorium, Toronto) |
| Irish Masters | Benson & Hedges Ireland Tournament; 1975–1977 | Invitational | Republic of Ireland; 1974/75–1975/76 (National Boxing Stadium, Dublin); 1976/77 (Leopardstown Racecourse, Leopardstown); 1977/78–1999/00 (Goffs, Kill); 2000/01–2004/05 (Citywest Hotel, Dublin); 2006/07 (Ormonde Hotel, Kilkenny) |
| Irish Masters | Irish Masters; 1977/78–2004/05; 2006/07 | Invitational; 1977/78–2001/02; 2006/07 | Republic of Ireland; 1974/75–1975/76 (National Boxing Stadium, Dublin); 1976/77 (Leopardstown Racecourse, Leopardstown); 1977/78–1999/00 (Goffs, Kill); 2000/01–2004/05 (Citywest Hotel, Dublin); 2006/07 (Ormonde Hotel, Kilkenny) |
| Irish Masters | Irish Masters; 1977/78–2004/05; 2006/07 | Ranking; 2002/03–2004/05 | Republic of Ireland; 1974/75–1975/76 (National Boxing Stadium, Dublin); 1976/77 (Leopardstown Racecourse, Leopardstown); 1977/78–1999/00 (Goffs, Kill); 2000/01–2004/05 (Citywest Hotel, Dublin); 2006/07 (Ormonde Hotel, Kilkenny) |
| Classic | 1979/80–1991/92 | Invitational; 1979/80–1982/83 | England; 1979/80 (New Century Hall, Manchester); 1980/81 (Blighty's, Bolton); 1981/82 (Civic Centre, Oldham); 1982/83–1985/86 (Spectrum Arena, Warrington); 1986/87–1989/90 (Norbreck Castle Hotel, Blackpool); 1990/91–1991/92 (International Centre, Bournemouth) |
| Classic | 1979/80–1991/92 | Ranking; 1983/84–1991/92 | England; 1979/80 (New Century Hall, Manchester); 1980/81 (Blighty's, Bolton); 1981/82 (Civic Centre, Oldham); 1982/83–1985/86 (Spectrum Arena, Warrington); 1986/87–1989/90 (Norbreck Castle Hotel, Blackpool); 1990/91–1991/92 (International Centre, Bournemouth) |
| Australian Goldfields Open | Australian Masters; 1979/80–1987/88 | Invitational | Australia; 1979/80–1983/84 (Channel 10 Television Studios, Sydney); 1984/85–1987/88 (Parmatta Club, Sydney) |
| Australian Goldfields Open | Hong Kong Open; 1989/90 | Ranking | Hong Kong (Hong Kong Convention and Exhibition Centre, Wan Chai) |
| Australian Goldfields Open | Australian Open; 1994/95–1995/96 | Non-ranking | Australia; 1994/95–1995/96 (Bentleigh Club, Melbourne); 2011/12–2015/16 (Bendigo Stadium, Bendigo) |
| Australian Goldfields Open | Australian Masters; 1995/96 | Invitational | Australia; 1994/95–1995/96 (Bentleigh Club, Melbourne); 2011/12–2015/16 (Bendigo Stadium, Bendigo) |
| Australian Goldfields Open | Australian Goldfields Open; 2011/12–2015/16 | Ranking | Australia; 1994/95–1995/96 (Bentleigh Club, Melbourne); 2011/12–2015/16 (Bendigo Stadium, Bendigo) |
| Northern Ireland Trophy | Northern Ireland Classic; 1981/82 | Invitational | Northern Ireland; 1981/82 (Ulster Hall, Belfast); 2005/06–2008/09 (Waterfront Hall, Belfast) |
| Northern Ireland Trophy | Northern Ireland Trophy; 2005/06–2008/09 | Invitational; 2005/06 | Northern Ireland; 1981/82 (Ulster Hall, Belfast); 2005/06–2008/09 (Waterfront Hall, Belfast) |
| Northern Ireland Trophy | Northern Ireland Trophy; 2005/06–2008/09 | Ranking; 2006/07–2008/09 | Northern Ireland; 1981/82 (Ulster Hall, Belfast); 2005/06–2008/09 (Waterfront Hall, Belfast) |
| Thailand Masters | Thailand Masters; 1983/84–1986/87; 1991/92 (World Series event) | Invitational | Thailand; 1983/84 (Thai Nippon Stadium, Bangkok); 1984/85–1985/86 (Ambassador Hotel, Bangkok); 1986/87 (Chiang Mai Plaza Hotel, Bangkok); 1991/92 (Bangkok) |
| Thailand Masters | Asian Open; 1989/90–1992/93 | Ranking | Thailand; 1989/90 (Channel 12 Studios, Bangkok); 1991/92–1992/93 (Imperial Queens Park Hotel, Bangkok) |
| Thailand Masters | Asian Open; 1989/90–1992/93 | Ranking | China; 1990/91 (GDTV, Guangzhou) |
| Thailand Masters | Thailand Open; 1993/94–1996/97 | Ranking | Thailand; 1993/94–1994/95 (Imperial Queens Park Hotel, Bangkok); 1995/96 (Montien Riverside Hotel, Bangkok); 1996/97 (Century Park Hotel, Bangkok) |
| Thailand Masters | Thailand Masters; 1997/98–2002/03; 2006/07 | Ranking; 1997/98–2001/02 | Thailand; 1997/98 (Imperial Queens Park Hotel, Bangkok); 1998/99 (Ambassador Hotel, Bangkok); 1999/00 (Riverside Montien Hotel, Bangkok); 2000/01–2001/02 (Merchant Court Hotel, Bangkok); 2002/03 (National Stadium, Bangkok); 2006/07 (Grand Hotel, Hua Hin) |
| Thailand Masters | Thailand Masters; 1997/98–2002/03; 2006/07 | Invitational; 2002/03; 2006/07 | Thailand; 1997/98 (Imperial Queens Park Hotel, Bangkok); 1998/99 (Ambassador Hotel, Bangkok); 1999/00 (Riverside Montien Hotel, Bangkok); 2000/01–2001/02 (Merchant Court Hotel, Bangkok); 2002/03 (National Stadium, Bangkok); 2006/07 (Grand Hotel, Hua Hin) |
| Dubai Classic | Dubai Masters; 1988/89 | Invitational | United Arab Emirates; 1988/89–1994/95 (Al Nasr Stadium, Dubai) |
| Dubai Classic | Dubai Classic; 1989/90–1994/95 | Ranking | United Arab Emirates; 1988/89–1994/95 (Al Nasr Stadium, Dubai) |
| Dubai Classic | Thailand Classic; 1995/96 | Ranking | Thailand; 1995/96 (Novotel, Bangkok); 1996/97 (Riverside Montien Hotel, Bangkok) |
| Dubai Classic | Asian Classic; 1996/97 | Ranking | Thailand; 1995/96 (Novotel, Bangkok); 1996/97 (Riverside Montien Hotel, Bangkok) |
| Masters Qualifying Event | Benson & Hedges Satellite Championship; 1990/91–1991/92 | Non-ranking | Scotland (Masters Club, Glasgow) |
| Masters Qualifying Event | Benson & Hedges Championship; 1992/93–2002/03 | Minor-ranking; 1992/93 | Scotland (Masters Club, Glasgow) |
| Masters Qualifying Event | Benson & Hedges Championship; 1992/93–2002/03 | Non-ranking; 1993/94–2002/03 | Scotland; 1993/94 (Masters Club, Glasgow); 1994/95–1996/97 (JP Snooker Centre, Edinburgh) |
| Masters Qualifying Event | Benson & Hedges Championship; 1992/93–2002/03 | Non-ranking; 1993/94–2002/03 | England; 1997/98–2000/01 (Willie Thorne Snooker Club, Malvern); 2001/02–2002/03 (Towers Snooker Club, Mansfield) |
| Masters Qualifying Event | Masters Qualifying Event; 2003/04; 2005/06–2009/10 | Non-ranking | Wales; 2003/04, 2005/06 & 2009/10 (Pontin's, Prestatyn) |
| Masters Qualifying Event | Masters Qualifying Event; 2003/04; 2005/06–2009/10 | Non-ranking | England; 2006/07–2008/09 (English Institute of Sport, Sheffield) |
| Strachan Open | Strachan Open; 1991/92 | Ranking | England; 1991/92 (Thornbury Leisure Centre, Bristol); 1992/93–1993/94 (Jimmy White Snooker Lodge, Aldershot); 1992/93 (Radion Plaxa Club, Sheffield); 1993/94 (Wille Thorne Snooker Lodge, Leicester) |
| Strachan Open | Strachan Challenge; 1992/93–1993/94 | Minor-ranking series 1992/93 | England; 1991/92 (Thornbury Leisure Centre, Bristol); 1992/93–1993/94 (Jimmy White Snooker Lodge, Aldershot); 1992/93 (Radion Plaxa Club, Sheffield); 1993/94 (Wille Thorne Snooker Lodge, Leicester) |
| Strachan Open | Strachan Challenge; 1992/93–1993/94 | Non-ranking; 1993/94 | England; 1991/92 (Thornbury Leisure Centre, Bristol); 1992/93–1993/94 (Jimmy White Snooker Lodge, Aldershot); 1992/93 (Radion Plaxa Club, Sheffield); 1993/94 (Wille Thorne Snooker Lodge, Leicester) |
| Malta Grand Prix | 1994/95–2000/01 | Invitational; 1994/95–1998/99; 2000/01 | Malta; 1994/95 (Jerma Palace Hotel, Marsaskala); 1995/96–1997/98 (Jerma Palace Hotel, Marsaskala); 1998/99 (New Dolmen Hotel, Buġibba); 1999/00–2000/01 (Mediterranean Conference Centre, Valletta) |
| Malta Grand Prix | 1994/95–2000/01 | Ranking; 1999/00 | Malta; 1994/95 (Jerma Palace Hotel, Marsaskala); 1995/96–1997/98 (Jerma Palace Hotel, Marsaskala); 1998/99 (New Dolmen Hotel, Buġibba); 1999/00–2000/01 (Mediterranean Conference Centre, Valletta) |
| China Open | China International; 1997/98–1998/99 | Invitational; 1997/98 | China; 1997/98 (Beijing); 1998/99 (JC Mandarin Hotel, Shanghai); 1999/00 (Beijing University Students' Gymnasium, Beijing); 2000/01 (Mission Hills Resort, Shenzhen); 2001/02 (International Gymnastic Centre, Shanghai); 2004/05 (Haidian Stadium, Beijing); 2005/06–2016/17 (Beijing University Students' Gymnasium); 2017/18–2018/19 (Olympic Sports Center Gymnasium, Beijing) |
| China Open | China International; 1997/98–1998/99 | Ranking; 1998/99 | China; 1997/98 (Beijing); 1998/99 (JC Mandarin Hotel, Shanghai); 1999/00 (Beijing University Students' Gymnasium, Beijing); 2000/01 (Mission Hills Resort, Shenzhen); 2001/02 (International Gymnastic Centre, Shanghai); 2004/05 (Haidian Stadium, Beijing); 2005/06–2016/17 (Beijing University Students' Gymnasium); 2017/18–2018/19 (Olympic Sports Center Gymnasium, Beijing) |
| China Open | China Open; 1999/00–2001/02; 2004/05–2018/19 | Ranking | China; 1997/98 (Beijing); 1998/99 (JC Mandarin Hotel, Shanghai); 1999/00 (Beijing University Students' Gymnasium, Beijing); 2000/01 (Mission Hills Resort, Shenzhen); 2001/02 (International Gymnastic Centre, Shanghai); 2004/05 (Haidian Stadium, Beijing); 2005/06–2016/17 (Beijing University Students' Gymnasium); 2017/18–2018/19 (Olympic Sports Center Gymnasium, Beijing) |
| Paul Hunter Classic | Grand Prix Fürth; 2004/05 | Pro–am | Germany (Stadthalle, Fürth) |
| Paul Hunter Classic | Fürth German Open; 2005/06–2006/07 | Pro–am | Germany (Stadthalle, Fürth) |
| Paul Hunter Classic | Paul Hunter Classic; 2007/08–2019/20 | Pro–am; 2007/08–2009/10 | Germany (Stadthalle, Fürth) |
| Paul Hunter Classic | Paul Hunter Classic; 2007/08–2019/20 | Minor-ranking; 2010/11–2015/16 | Germany (Stadthalle, Fürth) |
| Paul Hunter Classic | Paul Hunter Classic; 2007/08–2019/20 | Ranking; 2016/17–2018/19 | Germany (Stadthalle, Fürth) |
| Paul Hunter Classic | Paul Hunter Classic; 2007/08–2019/20 | Non-ranking; 2019/20 | Germany (Stadthalle, Fürth) |
| Bahrain Championship | 2008/09 | Ranking | Bahrain (International Exhibition & Convention Centre, Manama) |
| Wuxi Classic | Jiangsu Classic; 2008/09–2009/10 | Invitational | China; 2008/09 (Nanjing Olympic Sports Center Gymnasium, Nanjing); 2008/09–2010/11 (Wuxi Sports Center, Wuxi); 2011/12–2014/15 (Wuxi City Sports Park Stadium, Wuxi) |
| Wuxi Classic | Wuxi Classic; 2010/11–2014/15 | Invitational; 2010/11–2011/12 | China; 2008/09 (Nanjing Olympic Sports Center Gymnasium, Nanjing); 2008/09–2010/11 (Wuxi Sports Center, Wuxi); 2011/12–2014/15 (Wuxi City Sports Park Stadium, Wuxi) |
| Wuxi Classic | Wuxi Classic; 2010/11–2014/15 | Ranking; 2012/13–2014/15 | China; 2008/09 (Nanjing Olympic Sports Center Gymnasium, Nanjing); 2008/09–2010/11 (Wuxi Sports Center, Wuxi); 2011/12–2014/15 (Wuxi City Sports Park Stadium, Wuxi) |
| Indian Open | 2013/14–2014/15, 2016/17–2018/19 | Ranking | India; 2013/14 (Le Meridien Hotel, New Delhi); 2014/15 (Grand Hyatt, Mumbai); 2016/17 (HICC Novotel Hotel, Hyderabad); 2017/18 (Hotel Novotel Varun Beach, Vishakhapatnam); 2018/19 (Grand Hyatt Kochi Bolgatty, Kochi) |
| Riga Masters | Riga Open; 2014/15–2015/16 | Minor-ranking | Latvia (Arena Riga, Riga) |
| Riga Masters | Riga Masters; 2016/17–2019/20 | Ranking | Latvia (Arena Riga, Riga) |
| China Championship | 2016/17–2019/20 | Non-ranking; 2016/17 | China; 2016/17 (Guangzhou Gymnasium, Guangzhou); 2017/18 (Guangzhou Sport University, Guangzhou); 2018/19–2019/20 (Guangzhou Tianhe Sports Centre, Guangzhou) |
| China Championship | 2016/17–2019/20 | Ranking; 2017/18–2019/20 | China; 2016/17 (Guangzhou Gymnasium, Guangzhou); 2017/18 (Guangzhou Sport University, Guangzhou); 2018/19–2019/20 (Guangzhou Tianhe Sports Centre, Guangzhou) |
| WST Pro Series | 2020/21 | Ranking | England (Marshall Arena, Milton Keynes) |
| Turkish Masters | 2021/22 | Ranking | Turkey (Antalya) |

=== Minor-ranking ===
This is a list of minor-ranking professional snooker tournaments that no longer form part of the snooker calendar.

| Tournament | Event | Format | Location |
|---|---|---|---|
| Players Tour Championship | 2010/11–2015/16 | Minor-ranking series | England; 2010/11–2012/13 (World Snooker Academy, Sheffield); 2010/11–2013/14 (South West Snooker Academy, Gloucester); 2011/12 (English Institute of Sport, Sheffield); 2013/14 (The Dome Leisure Centre, Doncaster) |
| Players Tour Championship | 2010/11–2015/16 | Minor-ranking series | Germany; 2010/11–2015/16 (Stadthalle, Fürth); 2010/11 (Walter Kobel Sporthalle, Rüsselsheim); 2010/11 (Sparkassen Arena, Hamm); 2011/12–2012/13 (Event Forum, Fürstenfeldbruck); 2013/14–2015/16 (RWE-Sporthalle, Mülheim) |
| Players Tour Championship | 2010/11–2015/16 | Minor-ranking series | Belgium; 2010/11 (Boudewijn Seapark, Bruges); 2011/12–2013/14 (Lotto Arena, Antwerp) |
| Players Tour Championship | 2010/11–2015/16 | Minor-ranking series | Czech Republic; 2010/11 (Aréna Sparta Podvinný Mlýn, Prague) |
| Players Tour Championship | 2010/11–2015/16 | Minor-ranking series | Poland; 2011/12 (Arena Ursynów, Warsaw); 2012/13–2015/16 (Gdynia Sports Arena, Gdynia |
| Players Tour Championship | 2010/11–2015/16 | Minor-ranking series | Republic of Ireland; 2011/12 (Killarney Convention Centre, Killarney) |
| Players Tour Championship | 2010/11–2015/16 | Minor-ranking series | China; 2012/13–2013/14 (Zhangjiagang Sports Centre, Zhangjiagang); 2012/13–2014/15 (Yixing Sports Centre, Yixing); 2012/13–2013/14 (Henan Province Sports Stadium, Zhengzhou); 2013/14 (Dongguan Dongcheng Sports Garden, Dongguan); 2014/15–2015/16 (Haining Sports Centre, Haining); 2014/15 (Xuzhou Sports Centre, Xuzhou) |
| Players Tour Championship | 2010/11–2015/16 | Minor-ranking series | Bulgaria; 2012/13 (Princess Hotel, Sofia); 2013/14–2015/16 (Universiada Hall, Sofia) |
| Players Tour Championship | 2010/11–2015/16 | Minor-ranking series | Scotland; 2012/13 (Ravenscraig Regional Sports Facility, Ravenscraig) |
| Players Tour Championship | 2010/11–2015/16 | Minor-ranking series | The Netherlands; 2013/14 (Topsport Centrum, Rotterdam) |
| Players Tour Championship | 2010/11–2015/16 | Minor-ranking series | Latvia; 2014/15–2015/16 (Arena Riga, Riga) |
| Players Tour Championship | 2010/11–2015/16 | Minor-ranking series | Portugal; 2014/15 (Casal Vistoso Sports Centre, Lisbon) |
| Brugge Open | 2010/11 | PTC | Belgium (Boudewijn Seapark, Bruges) |
| Russelsheim Cup | 2010/11 | PTC | Germany (Walter Kobel Sporthalle, Rüsselsheim) |
| MIUS Cup | 2010/11 | PTC | England (South West Snooker Academy, Gloucester) |
| Ruhr Championship | 2010/11 | PTC | Germany (Sparkassen Arena, Hamm) |
| Prague Classic | 2010/11 | PTC | Czech Republic (Aréna Sparta Podvinný Mlýn, Prague) |
| Warsaw Classic | 2011/12 | PTC | Poland (Arena Ursynów, Warsaw) |
| Kay Suzanne Memorial Cup | Kay Suzanne Memorial Trophy; 2011/12–2012/13 | PTC | England (South West Snooker Academy, Gloucester) |
| Kay Suzanne Memorial Cup | Kay Suzanne Memorial Cup; 2013/14 | PTC | England (South West Snooker Academy, Gloucester) |
| Alex Higgins International Trophy | 2011/12 | PTC | Republic of Ireland (Killarney Convention Centre, Killarney) |
| Antwerp Open | 2011/12–2013/14 | PTC | Belgium (Lotto Arena, Antwerp) |
| FFB Open | FFB Snooker Open; 2011/12 | PTC | England (World Snooker Academy, Sheffield); Germany (Event Forum, Fürstenfeldbruck) |
| FFB Open | FFB Open; 2012/13 | PTC | England (World Snooker Academy, Sheffield); Germany (Event Forum, Fürstenfeldbruck) |
| Bulgarian Open | 2012/13–2015/16 | PTC | Bulgaria; 2012/13 (Princess Hotel, Sofia); 2013/14–2015/16 (Universiada Hall, Sofia) |
| Gdynia Open | 2012/13–2015/16 | PTC | England; 2012/13 (World Snooker Academy, Sheffield) |
| Gdynia Open | 2012/13–2015/16 | PTC | Poland; 2012/13–2015/16 (Gdynia Sports Arena, Gdynia) |
| Yixing Open | 2013/14–2014/15 | PTC | China (Yixing Sports Centre, Yixing) |
| Rotterdam Open | 2013/14 | PTC | The Netherlands (Topsport Centrum, Rotterdam) |
| Bluebell Wood Open | 2013/14 | PTC | England (The Dome Leisure Centre, Doncaster) |
| Zhangjiagang Open | 2013/14 | PTC | China (Zhangjiagang Sports Center, Zhangjiagang) |
| Zhengzhou Open | 2013/14 | PTC | China (Guanhua Grand Hotel, Zhengzhou) |
| Dongguan Open | 2013/14 | PTC | China (Dongguan Dongcheng Sports Garden, Dongguan) |
| Ruhr Open | 2013/14–2015/16 | PTC | Germany (RWE-Sporthalle, Mülheim) |
| Xuzhou Open | 2014/15 | PTC | China (Xuzhou Olympic Center, Xuzhou) |

=== Non-ranking ===
The professional snooker tournaments listed below were non-ranking and invitational events.

| Tournament | Event | Format | Location |
|---|---|---|---|
| Welsh Professional Championship | 1922, 1977 (challenge basis); 1980/81–1990/91 | Invitational | Wales; 1922 (Burroughes & Watts Hall, Cardiff); 1977 (Club Double Diamond, Caerphilly); 1980/81–1983/84 (Ebbw Vale Leisure Centre, Ebbw Vale); 1984/85–1985/86 (Abertillery Leisure Centre, Abertillery); 1986/87–1990/91 (Newport Centre, Newport) |
| Daily Mail Gold Cup | 1936–1940 | Invitational | England (Thurston's Hall, London) |
| Irish Professional Championship | 1947–1981 (challenge basis); 1981/82–1982/83; 1984/85–1988/89; 1991/92–1992/93; 2005/06–2007/08 | Invitational | Northern Ireland; 1947–1971 (various); 1971/72–1979/80, 1984/85 (Ulster Hall, Belfast); 1980/81–1981/82 (Riverside Theatre, Coleraine); 1982/83, 1985/86 (Maysfield Leisure Centre, Belfast); 1986/87–1988/89 (Antrim Forum, Antrim) |
| Irish Professional Championship | 1947–1981 (challenge basis); 1981/82–1982/83; 1984/85–1988/89; 1991/92–1992/93; 2005/06–2007/08 | Invitational | Republic of Ireland; 1991/92–1992/93 (Jury's Hotel, Cork); 2005/06–2006/07 (Spawell Sport & Leisure Complex, Templeogue); 2007/08 (Red Cow Exhibition Centre, Dublin) |
| South African Professional Championship | 1948–1977, 1980–1984 (challenge basis); 1978/79–1979/80; 1986/87–1988/89 | Invitational | South Africa; 1948–1984 (various); 1986/87–1988/89 (Summit Club, Johannesburg) |
| Sunday Empire News Tournament | 1948 | Invitational | England (Leicester Square Hall, London) |
| Scottish Professional Championship | 1949/50–1953/54; 1979/80–1988/89; 2010/11 | Invitational | Scotland; 1949/50–1951/52 (Nile Rooms, Edinburgh); 1952/53–1953/54 (Union Club, Glasgow); 1979/80–1980/81 (Cumbernauld Theatre, Kildrum); 1981/82–1982/83 (Glen Pavilion, Dunfermline); 1983/84 (Glasgow University Student's Union, Glasgow; 1984/85–1985/86 (Marco's Leisure Centre, Edinburgh); 1986/87 (Steve Davis Club, Glasgow); 1987/88–1988/89 (Marco's Leisure Centre, Edinburgh); 2010/11 (Lucky Break Snooker Club, Clydebank) |
| Sporting Record Masters' Snooker Tournament | 1950 | Invitational | England (Leicester Square Hall, London) |
| News of the World Tournament | 1950–1959 | Invitational | England; 1949/50–1954/55 (Leicester Square Hall, London); 1955/56–1957/58 (various); 1958–1959 (Burroughes Hall, London) |
| World Professional Match-play Championship | 1952–1957 (alternative World Championship) | Non-ranking | United Kingdom (various) |
| World Professional Match-play Championship | 1976/77 (WPBSA event) | Non-ranking | Australia (Nunawading Basketball Centre, Melbourne) |
| Australian Professional Championship | 1963–1975 (challenge basis); 1975/76–1977/78; 1984/85–1988/89 | Invitational | Australia; 1963–1975 (various); 1975/76 (Wagga RSL Club, Wagga Wagga); 1976/77 (Dandanong Football Club, Melbourne); 1977/78 (Golden Bowl Sports Centre, Melbourne); 1978/79 (Grafton); 1984/85 (RSL Club, Dubbo); 1985/86 (Orange RSL, Sydney); 1986/87 (Wooloongong, Sydney); 1987/88 (Lakemba Club, Sydney); 1988/89 (Roots Hill Retired Soldiers Club, Sydney) |
| Willie Smith Trophy | 1968 | Invitational | England (Queen's Hall, Leeds) |
| Pot Black | 1968/69–1985/86; 1991/92–1993/94; 2005/06–2007/08 | Invitational | England; 1968/69–1971/72 (BBC Studios, Birmingham); 1972/73–1985/86 (Pebble Mill Studios, Birmingham); 1991/92 (Trentham Gardens, Stoke-on-Trent); 1992/93 (Norbreck Hydro, Blackpool); 1993/94 (Pebble Mill Studios, Birmingham); 2005/06–2006/07 (Royal Automobile Club, London); 2007/08 (Sheffield City Hall, Sheffield) |
| Stratford Professional | 1970/71–1972/73 | Invitational | England; 1970/71 (Stratford-upon-Avon); 1971/72 (Wilmcote Working Men's Club, Wilmcote); 1972/73 (Wootton Wawen Social Club, Wootton Wawen) |
| Park Drive 2000 | 1970/71–1972/73 | Invitational | England (various) |
| Men of the Midlands | 1972/73–1973/74 | Invitational | England (various) |
| Norwich Union Open | 1973/74–1974/75 | Invitational | England (Piccadilly Hotel, London) |
| Pontins Professional | 1973/74–1999/00 | Invitational | Wales (Pontins, Prestatyn) |
| World Masters | 1974/75 | Invitational | Australia (Victorian Club, South Yarra) |
| Watney Open | 1974/75 | Invitational | England (Northern Snooker Centre, Leeds) |
| Canadian Club Masters | 1975/76 | Invitational | England (Northern Snooker Centre, Leeds) |
| Dry Blackthorn Cup | 1977/78 | Invitational | England (Wembley Conference Centre, London) |
| Golden Masters | 1977/78–1978/79 | Invitational | Northern Ireland (Queen's Hall, Newtownards) |
| Holsten Lager International | 1978/79 | Invitational | England (Fulcrum Centre, Slough) |
| Forward Chemicals Tournament | 1978/79 | Invitational | England Royal Exchange Theatre, Manchester) |
| Bombay International | 1978/79–1979/80 | Invitational | India (Bombay Gymkhana, Bombay) |
| Tolly Cobbold Classic | 1978/79–1983/84 | Invitational | England (Corn Exchange, Ipswich) |
| Limosin International | 1979/80 | Invitational | South Africa (Good Hope Centre, Cape Town) |
| Kronenbrau 1308 Classic | 1979/80 | Invitational | South Africa (Johannesburg) |
| Padmore Super Crystalate International | 1979/80 | Invitational | England (Great Baths, West Bromwich) |
| Pontins Camber Sands | 1979/80 | Invitational | England (Camber Sands Holiday Village, Rye) |
| Canadian Professional Championship | 1980/81; 1983/84–1988/89 | Invitational | Canada (Various, Toronto) |
| English Professional Championship | 1980/81; 1984/85–1988/89 | Invitational | England; 1980/81 (Haden Hill Leisure Centre, Birmingham); 1984/85–1987/88 (Corn Exchange, Ipswich); 1988/89 (Redwood Lodge, Bristol) |
| Scottish Masters | 1981/82–1987/88; 1989/90–2002/03 | Invitational | Scotland; 1981/82 (Kelvin Hall, Glasgow); 1982/83 (Holiday Inn, Glasgow); 1983/84 (Skean Dhu Hotel, Glasgow); 1984/85–1987/88 (Hospitality Inn, Glasgow); 1989/90 (SECC, Glasgow); 1990/91–2000/01 (Civic Centre, Motherwell); 2001/02–2002/03 (Thistle Hotel, Glasgow) |
| Highland Masters | 1981/82 | Invitational | Scotland (Eden Court Theatre, Inverness) |
| Bass and Golden Leisure Classic | 1981/82 | Non-ranking | England (Golden Leisure Snooker Centre, Liverpool) |
| World Doubles Championship | 1982/83–1987/88 | Non-ranking | England; 1982/83 (Crystal Palace National Recreation Centre); 1983/84–1987/88 (Derngate, Northampton) |
| Pontins Brean Sands | 1982/83 | Invitational | England (Sands Holiday Village, Burnham-on-Sea) |
| Hong Kong Masters | Hong Kong Masters; 1983/84–1987/88; 2017/18 | Invitational | Hong Kong; 1983/84–1987/88 (Queen Elizabeth Stadium, Wan Chai); 1990/91–1991/92 (Hong Kong Hilton, Central; 2017/18 (Queen Elizabeth Stadium, Wan Chai) |
| Hong Kong Masters | Hong Kong Challenge; 1990/91–1991/92 | Invitational | Hong Kong; 1983/84–1987/88 (Queen Elizabeth Stadium, Wan Chai); 1990/91–1991/92 (Hong Kong Hilton, Central; 2017/18 (Queen Elizabeth Stadium, Wan Chai) |
| Premier League Snooker | Professional Snooker League; 1983/84 | Invitational | United Kingdom (various) |
| Premier League Snooker | Matchroom League; 1986/87–1991/92 | Invitational | United Kingdom (various) |
| Premier League Snooker | European League; 1992/93–1996/97 | Invitational | United Kingdom (various) |
| Premier League Snooker | Premier League Snooker; 1997/98–2012/13 | Invitational; 1997/98–2012/13; Invitational 2011/12 (alternative rules) | United Kingdom (various) |
| Premier League Snooker | International League; 1989/90 (international edition) | Invitational | Europe (various) |
| New Zealand Masters | 1984/85–1989/90 | Non-ranking | New Zealand; 1984/85 (Kingsgate Convention Centre, Auckland); 1988/89–1989/90 (New Zealand Parliament, Wellington) |
| Costa Del Sol Classic | 1984/85 | Non-ranking | Spain (Golden Leisure Snooker Centre, Fuengirola) |
| Singapore Masters | 1984/85–1985/86 | Invitational | Singapore |
| Malaysian Masters | 1984/85; 1986/87; 1995/96 | Invitational | Malaysia; 1984/85 (Selangor Club, Kuala Lumpur); 1986/87 (Putra World Trade Centre, Kuala Lumpur) |
| Fosters Professional | Carlsberg Challenge; 1984/85–1986/87 | Invitational | Republic of Ireland (RTÉ Studios, Dublin) |
| Fosters Professional | Carling Challenge; 1987/88 | Invitational | Republic of Ireland (RTÉ Studios, Dublin) |
| Fosters Professional | Fosters Professional; 1988/89 | Invitational | Republic of Ireland (RTÉ Studios, Dublin) |
| Kit Kat Break for World Champions | 1985/86 | Non-ranking | England (East Midlands Conference Centre, Nottingham) |
| Belgian Classic | 1985/86 | Invitational | Belgium (Ostend Casino, Ostend) |
| China Masters | 1985/86–1986/87; 1995/96 | Invitational | China; 1985/86 (White Swan Hotel, Guangzhou); 1986/87 (Shanghai) |
| Matchroom Professional Championship | 1986/87–1988/89 | Invitational | England (Cliffs Pavilion, Southend-on-sea) |
| Kent Cup | Kent Cup; 1986/87–1990/91 | Invitational | China; 1986/87–1987/88 (Beijing Indoor Stadium, Beijing); 1989/90–1990/91 (Yuetan Gymnasium, Beijing); 1992/93 (Hiadian Stadium, Beijing) |
| Kent Cup | Kent Classic; 1992/93 | Invitational | China; 1986/87–1987/88 (Beijing Indoor Stadium, Beijing); 1989/90–1990/91 (Yuetan Gymnasium, Beijing); 1992/93 (Hiadian Stadium, Beijing) |
| World Series of Snooker | World Series; 1987/88 (Matchroom event); 1990/91–1992/93 (Matchroom event) | Invitational | International (various) |
| World Series of Snooker | World Series of Snooker; 2008/09–2009/10 (FSTC Sports Management event) | Invitational | Europe (various) |
| Tokyo Masters | 1987/88 | Invitational | Japan (Tokyo) |
| Norwich Union Grand Prix | 1988/89–1990/91 | Invitational | Europe; 1988/89 (various) |
| Norwich Union Grand Prix | 1988/89–1990/91 | Invitational | Monaco; 1988/89–1990/91 (Monte Carlo) |
| London Masters | 1988/89–1990/91 | Invitational | England (Café Royal, London) |
| World Matchplay | 1988/89–1992/93 (Matchroom event) | Invitational | England; 1988/89–1990/91 (Brentwood Centre, Brentwood); 1991/92–1992/93 (The Dome Leisure Centre, Doncaster) |
| Hong Kong Gold Cup | 1989/90 | Invitational | Hong Kong (Queen Elizabeth Stadium, Wan Chai) |
| Belgian Masters | 1990/91–1992/93; 1995/96 | Invitational | Belgium |
| Centenary Challenge | 1990/91 | Invitational | United Kingdom (Civic Centre, Aylesbury) (AECC, Aberdeen) (Cafe Royal, London) |
| King's Cup | 1990/91; 1992/93–1994/95 | Invitational | Thailand (Bangkok) |
| European Grand Masters | 1990/91 | Invitational | Monaco (Monte Carlo) |
| World Masters | 1990/91 | Non-ranking; Men/Ladies/Junior | England (National Exhibition Centre, Birmingham) |
| Gold Flake International Masters Championship | 1990/91 | Invitational | India (Bangalore) |
| Nescafe Extra Challenge | 1990/91; 1992/93 | Invitational | Thailand (Bangkok) |
| European Masters League | 1991/92 | Invitational | Europe (various) |
| European Challenge | 1991/92–1992/93 | Invitational | Belgium; 1991/92 (European Sports & Business Centre, Waregem) |
| European Challenge | 1991/92–1992/93 | Invitational | France; 1992/93 (Épernay) |
| Indian Challenge | 1991/92 | Invitational | India (Taj Palace Intercontinental Hotel, Delhi) |
| Belgian Challenge | 1991/92 | Invitational | Belgium (Matchroom Schijnpoort, Antwerp) |
| Indian Masters | 1992/93 | Invitational | India (Delhi) |
| Merseyside Professional Championship | 1993/94–2004/05 | Non-ranking | England; 1993/94–1998/99 (Liverpool Billiards & Snooker Club, Liverpool); 1999/00–2004/05 (George Scott Snooker Club, Liverpool) |
| Top Rank Classic | 1994/95 | Invitational | Thailand (Hat Yai) |
| Champions Cup | Charity Challenge; 1994/95–1998/99 | Invitational | England; 1994/95–1996/97 (International Convention Centre, Birmingham; 1997/98–1998/99 (Assembly Rooms, Derby); 1999/00 (Fairfield Halls, Croydon); 2000/01–2001/02 (Brighton Centre, Brighton) |
| Champions Cup | Champions Cup; 1999/00–2001/02 | Invitational | England; 1994/95–1996/97 (International Convention Centre, Birmingham; 1997/98–1998/99 (Assembly Rooms, Derby); 1999/00 (Fairfield Halls, Croydon); 2000/01–2001/02 (Brighton Centre, Brighton) |
| Red & White Challenge | 1995/96 | Invitational | Pakistan (Islamabad) |
| Guangzhou Masters | 1995/96 | Invitational | China (Guangzhou) |
| Finnish Masters | 1995/96 | Invitational | Finland |
| Pakistan Masters | 1995/96 | Invitational | Pakistan |
| Malta Masters | 1995/96 | Invitational | Malta (Jerma Palace Hotel, Marsaskala) |
| Poland Masters | 1995/96 | Invitational | Poland |
| Superstar International | 1997/98 | Invitational | China (Guangdong Hotel, Guangzhou) |
| Super Challenge | 1998/99 | Invitational | China (Guangzhou) |
| Champions Super League | 1998/99 | Invitational | China (Shenyang, Xi'an, Beijing) |
| Nations Cup | 1998/99–2000/01 | Invitational | England; 1998/99 (Telewest Arena, Newcastle-upon-Tyne); 1999/00–2000/01 (The Hexagon, Reading) |
| Millennium Cup | 1999/00 | Invitational | Hong Kong (Regent Hotel, Kowloon) |
| World Seniors Masters | 1999/00 | Invitational | England (Royal Automobile Club, London) |
| Irish Open | 2002/03 | Invitational | Northern Ireland (Millennium Forum, Derry) |
| Euro-Asia Masters Challenge | 2003/04, 2007/08 | Invitational | Hong Kong; 2003/04, 2007/08 (HKCEC, Wan Chai) |
| Euro-Asia Masters Challenge | 2003/04, 2007/08 | Invitational | Thailand; 2003/04 (Merchant Court Hotel, Bangkok) |
| World Champions v Asia Stars Challenge | 2004/05 | Invitational | Thailand (BEC-Tero Hotel, Bangkok) |
| Warsaw Snooker Tour | 2007/08 | Invitational | Poland (Torwar Hall, Warsaw) |
| Irish Classic | 2007/08–2011/12 | Invitational | Republic of Ireland; 2007/08 (Raphael's Snooker Club, Dublin); 2008/09–2010/11 (Celbridge Snooker Club, Kildare) |
| Huangshan Cup | 2007/08 | Invitational | China (Anhui Sports Bureau, Hefei) |
| Legends of Snooker | 2009/10 | Invitational | Scotland (Rothes Hall, Glenrothes) |
| Beijing International Challenge | 2009/10–2010/11 | Invitational | China (Beijing University Students' Gymnasium, Beijing) |
| Pro Challenge Series | 2009/10 | Non-Ranking | England (Northern Snooker Centre, Leeds) (Pontins, Prestatyn) (Willie Thorne Snooker Centre, Leicester); George Scott Snooker Club, Liverpool) |
| Hainan Classic | 2010/11 | Invitational | China (Boao Conference Center, Boao) |
| Brazil Masters | 2011/12 | Invitational | Brazil (Costão do Santinho Resort, Florianópolis) |
| General Cup | General Cup International; 2004/05; 2009/10; 2011/12 | Invitational | Hong Kong (General Snooker Club, Kwun Tong) |
| General Cup | General Cup; 2012/13–2015/16 | Invitational | Hong Kong (General Snooker Club, Kwun Tong) |
| CVB Challenge | 2017/18 | Invitational | China (Nanshan Culture & Sports Centre, Shenzhen) |
| Romanian Masters | 2017/18 | Invitational | Romania (Metropolitan Circus, Bucharest) |

=== Pro-am ===
| Tournament | Event | Format | Location |
|---|---|---|---|
| Pontins Open | Spring Open; 1973/74–2010/11 | Pro–am | Wales (Pontin's, Prestatyn) |
| Pontins Open | Autumn Open; 1981/82–2009/10 | Pro–am | Wales (Pontin's, Prestatyn) |
| Pontins Open | World Series; 2006/07–2009/10 | Pro–am | Wales (Pontin's, Prestatyn) |
| Dutch Open | 1987/88–1989/90; 1992/93; 2004/05–2012/13 | Pro–am | The Netherlands; 1987/88 (Ahoy Stadium, Rotterdam); 1988/89 (Veronica TV Building, Hilversum); 1989/90 (Lijnbaan Snooker Centre, Rotterdam); 1992/93 (Het Turfschip, Breda); 2004/05–2012/13 (Snookercentrum De Dieze, Den Bosch) |
| Austrian Open | 1992/93–1997/98; 1999/00–2001/02; 2005/06–2008/09; 2010/11, 2012/13 | Pro–am | Austria (BRP-Hall, Wels) |
| Asian Games | 1998/99–2010/11 | Pro–am | Thailand; 1998 (Land Sports Complex, Bangkok) |
| Asian Games | 1998/99–2010/11 | Pro–am | South Korea; 2002 (Dongju College Gymnasium, Busan |
| Asian Games | 1998/99–2010/11 | Pro–am | Qatar; 2006 (Al-Sadd Multi-Purpose Hall, Doha) |
| Asian Games | 1998/99–2010/11 | Pro–am | China; 2010 (Asian Games Town Gymnasium, Guangzhou) |
| Swiss Open | 2003/04–2007/08 | Pro–am | Switzerland (Billard Center Im Funken, Zofingen) |
| Belgian Open | 2008/09, 2017/18 | Pro–am | Belgium; 2008/09 (Sportcentrum De Pollepel, Duffel); 2017/18 (Snooker Club Arena, Ghent) |
| 3 Kings Open | 2009/10–2019/20 | Pro–am | Austria (Patrick's Canadian Tavern, Rankweil) |
| Finnish Snooker Challenge | 2009/10 | Pro–am | Finland (Sports Club Turku, Turku) |
| Singapore Open | 2016/17 | Pro–am | Singapore (Lagoon Billiard, Toa Payoh) |
| Italian Open | 2016/17 | Pro–am | Italy (Sala Torre, Bolzano) |
| Golden Q Cup | 2018/19 | Pro–am | Romania (Golden Q Snooker Club, Baia Mare) |

=== Secondary professional tour ===
| Tournament | Event | Format | Location |
|---|---|---|---|
| Challenge Tour | WPBSA Minor Tour; 1994/95 | Non-ranking | Global (various) |
| Challenge Tour | UK Tour; 1997/98–1999/00 | Non-ranking | Global (various) |
| Challenge Tour | Challenge Tour; 2000/01–2004/05; 2018/19–2019/20 | Non-ranking; 2000/01–2004/05 | Global (various) |
| Challenge Tour | Challenge Tour; 2000/01–2004/05; 2018/19–2019/20 | Amateur; 2018/19–2019/20 | Global (various) |
| International Open Series | Open Tour; 2001/02–2003/04 | Non-ranking; 2001/02 | United Kingdom (various) |
| International Open Series | Open Tour; 2001/02–2003/04 | Pro–am; 2002/03 | United Kingdom (various) |
| International Open Series | Open Tour; 2001/02–2003/04 | Amateur; 2003/04 | United Kingdom (various) |
| International Open Series | International Open Series; 2005/06–2009/10 | Amateur | Wales (Pontin's, Prestatyn) |

=== Alternative forms of snooker ===
| Tournament | Event | Format | Location |
|---|---|---|---|
| News of the World Snooker Plus Tournament | 1959 | Invitational | England (Burroughes Hall, London) |
| Tenball | 1994/95 | Invitational | England (Methodist Church Hall, London) |
| Six-red World Championship | Six-red Snooker International; 2008/09 | Invitational | Thailand; 2008/09–2014/15 (Montien Riverside Hotel, Bangkok); 2015/16 (Fashion Island Shopping Mall, Bangkok; 2016/17–2019/20 (Bangkok Convention Center, Bangkok) |
| Six-red World Championship | Six-red World Grand Prix; 2009/10 | Invitational | Thailand; 2008/09–2014/15 (Montien Riverside Hotel, Bangkok); 2015/16 (Fashion Island Shopping Mall, Bangkok; 2016/17–2019/20 (Bangkok Convention Center, Bangkok) |
| Six-red World Championship | Six-red World Championship; 2010/11; 2012/13–2019/20 | Invitational | Thailand; 2008/09–2014/15 (Montien Riverside Hotel, Bangkok); 2015/16 (Fashion Island Shopping Mall, Bangkok; 2016/17–2019/20 (Bangkok Convention Center, Bangkok) |
| 888sport Six-red World Championship | 2009/10 | Invitational | Republic of Ireland (Killarney, Republic of Ireland) |
| Power Snooker | 2010/11–2011/12 | Invitational | England; 2010/2011 (The O2, London); 2011/2012 (Trafford Centre, Manchester) |
| Macau Masters | 2018/19 | Invitational | Macau (JW Marriott Hotel) |
| Seniors 6-Red World Championship | 2018/19 | Non-Ranking | Northern Ireland (Waterfront Hall, Belfast) |

== See also ==
- List of snooker players by number of ranking titles
- Snooker amateur competitions
