= 1997–98 snooker season =

Details
- Duration: 14 August 1997 – 17 May 1998
- Tournaments: 18 (8 ranking events)

Triple Crown winners
- UK Championship: (England) Ronnie O'Sullivan
- Masters: (Wales) Mark Williams
- World Championship: (Scotland) John Higgins

The 1997–98 snooker season was a series of snooker tournaments played between August 1997 and May 1998. The following table outlines the results for ranking events and the invitational events. This was the first season since 1987–88 that Stephen Hendry failed to win at least one Triple Crown title, although he did reach two of the three Triple Crown finals.

== Calendar ==
Start	Finish	Country	Tournament name	Venue	City	Winner	Runner-up	Score	Ref.
14 Aug	16 Aug	CHN	Superstar International	Guangdong Hotel	Guangzhou	(England) Ronnie O'Sullivan	(England) Jimmy White	5–3	
17 Sep	20 Sep	CHN	China International		Beijing	(England) Steve Davis	(England) Jimmy White	7–4	
30 Sep	5 Oct	SCO	Scottish Masters	Civic Centre	Motherwell	(England) Nigel Bond	(Scotland) Alan McManus	9–8	
14 Oct	26 Oct	ENG	Grand Prix	Bournemouth International Centre	Bournemouth	(Wales) Dominic Dale	(Scotland) John Higgins	9–6	
27 Oct	8 Nov	ENG	Benson & Hedges Championship	Willie Thorne Snooker Centre	Malvern	(England) Andy Hicks	(Wales) Paul Davies	9–6	
30 Oct	2 Nov	MLT	Malta Grand Prix	Jerma Palace Hotel	Marsaskala	(Republic of Ireland) Ken Doherty	(Scotland) John Higgins	7–5	
12 Nov	30 Nov	ENG	UK Championship	Guild Hall	Preston	(England) Ronnie O'Sullivan	(Scotland) Stephen Hendry	10–6	
8 Dec	14 Dec	GER	German Open	Atlantis Rheinhotel	Bingen am Rhein	(Scotland) John Higgins	(England) John Parrott	9–4	
16 Jan	25 Jan	WAL	Welsh Open	Newport Leisure Centre	Newport	(England) Paul Hunter	(Scotland) John Higgins	9–5	
1 Feb	8 Feb	ENG	The Masters	Wembley Conference Centre	London	(Wales) Mark Williams	(Scotland) Stephen Hendry	10–9	
12 Feb	22 Feb	SCO	Scottish Open	A.E.C.C.	Aberdeen	(England) Ronnie O'Sullivan	(Scotland) John Higgins	9–5	
26 Feb	1 Mar	ENG	Charity Challenge	Assembly Rooms	Derby	(Scotland) John Higgins	(England) Ronnie O'Sullivan	9–8	
7 Mar	15 Mar	THA	Thailand Masters	Imperial Queens Park Hotel	Bangkok	(Scotland) Stephen Hendry	(England) John Parrott	9–6	
24 Mar	29 Mar	IRL	Irish Masters	Goff's	Kill	(Republic of Ireland) Ken Doherty	(England) Ronnie O'Sullivan	Disqualified (Note: Having won 9–3, Ronnie O'Sullivan was subsequently stripped of his title and disqualified from the tournament, after failing a drugs test. The title was subsequently awarded to the runner-up, Ken Doherty.)	
2 Apr	12 Apr	ENG	British Open	Plymouth Pavilions	Plymouth	(Scotland) John Higgins	(Scotland) Stephen Hendry	9–8	
18 Apr	4 May	ENG	World Snooker Championship	Crucible Theatre	Sheffield	(Scotland) John Higgins	(Republic of Ireland) Ken Doherty	18–12	
16 May	23 May	WAL	Pontins Professional	Pontins	Prestatyn	(Wales) Mark Williams	(England) Martin Clark	9–6	
3 Jan	24 May	ENG	Premier League	Diamond Centre	Irthlingborough	(Republic of Ireland) Ken Doherty	(England) Jimmy White	10–2	

Ranking event
Non-ranking event

== Official rankings ==
The top 16 of the world rankings, these players automatically played in the final rounds of the world ranking events and were invited for the Masters.

No.	Ch.	Name	Points
1	Steady	(Scotland) Stephen Hendry	43127
2	Steady	(Scotland) John Higgins	30867
3	▲	(Republic of Ireland) Ken Doherty	28601
4	▲	(Wales) Mark Williams	27485
5	▼	(England) Peter Ebdon	25282
6	▼	(England) John Parrott	25082
7	▲	(England) Ronnie O'Sullivan	24217
8	▼	(England) Nigel Bond	22182
9	▲	(Canada) Alain Robidoux	21994
10	▼	(Scotland) Alan McManus	20995
11	▲	(Malta) Tony Drago	19959
12	Steady	(Thailand) James Wattana	18822
13	▼	(England) Steve Davis	18654
14	▲	(England) Anthony Hamilton	17004
15	▼	(Wales) Darren Morgan	16423
16	▲	(England) Stephen Lee	16079
