= Guo Hua =

Chinese snooker player (born 1971)

Personal information
- Born: 30 July 1971 (age 55) Chaozhou, Guangdong, China

Sport
- Country: China
- Sport: Snooker
- Professional: 1995–1997, 1998/1999
- Highest ranking: 176 (1998/1999)
- Best ranking finish: Last 32 (1994 Thailand Open)

Guo Hua (Chinese: 郭华; born 30 July 1971) is a Chinese former professional snooker player.

== Career ==
The best result Guo had was reaching the last 32 in the 1994 Thailand Open when he was an amateur. In the round of wild cards, he defeated David Finbow 5–3, before losing 2–5 to Neal Foulds.

In 2018 he played in the Shanghai Masters tournament as a wildcard, losing in the opening round against Neil Robertson.

== Performance and rankings timeline ==
Tournament	1992/ 93	1993/ 94	1995/ 96	1996/ 97	1997/ 98	1998/ 99	1999/ 00	2004/ 05	2018/ 19
Ranking	(Note: He was an amateur)		(Note: New players don't have a ranking)	444					
Ranking tournaments
World Open (Note: The event was called the Grand Prix (1992/1993–1993/1994, 1995/1996–1999/2000 and 2004/2005))	A	A	WD	LQ	A	LQ	A	A	A
European Masters (Note: The event was called the European Open (1992/1993–1993/1994, 1995/1996–1996/1997), the Irish Open (1998/1999) and the Malta Cup (2004/2005))	A	A	WD	LQ	NH	LQ	A	A	A
UK Championship	A	A	WD	LQ	A	LQ	A	A	A
Scottish Open (Note: The event was called the International Open (1992/1993–1993/1994, 1995/1996–1996/1997))	A	A	LQ	LQ	A	LQ	A	NH	A
German Masters (Note: The event was called the German Open (1995/1996–1997/1998))	Not Held		WD	A	A	NR	Not Held		A
World Grand Prix	Tournament Not Held								DNQ
Welsh Open	A	A	WD	LQ	A	LQ	A	A	A
Players Championship	Tournament Not Held								DNQ
Tour Championship	Tournament Not Held								DNQ
China Open (Note: The event was called the China International (1997/1998–1998/1999))	Tournament Not Held				NR	LQ	A	WR	A
World Championship	A	A	LQ	WD	A	LQ	LQ	A	A
Non-ranking tournaments
Shanghai Masters	Tournament Not Held								1R
Former ranking tournaments
Asian Classic (Note: The event was called the Dubai Classic (1992/1993–1993/1994) and the Thailand Classic (1995/1996))	A	A	WD	LQ	Tournament Not Held				
Thailand Masters (Note: The event was called the Asian Open (1992/1993) and the Thailand Open (1993/1994, 1995/1996–1996/1997))	A	1R	LQ	LQ	WR	LQ	A	Not Held	
British Open	A	A	LQ	LQ	A	LQ	A	A	NH
Former non-ranking tournaments
Kent Classic	1R	Tournament Not Held							
Guangzhou Masters	Not Held		SF	Tournament Not Held					
Superstar International	Tournament Not Held				SF	Tournament Not Held			
China International	Tournament Not Held				QF	Ranking Event			
Super Challenge	Tournament Not Held					RR	Not Held		
Champions Super League	Tournament Not Held					RR	Not Held		

Performance Table Legend
LQ	lost in the qualifying draw	#R	lost in the early rounds of the tournament (WR = Wildcard round, RR = Round robin)	QF	lost in the quarter-finals
SF	lost in the semi-finals	F	lost in the final	W	won the tournament
DNQ	did not qualify for the tournament	A	did not participate in the tournament	WD	withdrew from the tournament

NH / Not Held	means an event was not held.
NR / Non-Ranking Event	means an event is/was no longer a ranking event.
R / Ranking Event	means an event is/was a ranking event.
MR / Minor-Ranking Event	means an event is/was a minor-ranking event.
PA / Pro-am Event	means an event is/was a pro-am event.
