= 1999 China International =

China International
Tournament information
- Dates: 8–14 March 1999
- Venue: JC Mandarin Hotel
- City: Shanghai
- Country: China
- Organisation: WPBSA
- Format: Ranking event
- Total prize fund: £255,000
- Winner's share: £42,000
- Highest break: Michael Holt (ENG)

Final
- Champion: John Higgins (SCO)
- Runner-up: Billy Snaddon (SCO)
- Score: 9–3

The 1999 China International was a professional ranking snooker tournament that took place from 8–14 March 1999 at the JC Mandarin Hotel in Shanghai, China. The tournament was the inaugural staging of the event as a ranking tournament, after the 1997 edition had previously been held as an invitational tournament. This edition was the seventh ranking event out of the 1998/1999 season.

John Higgins won the tournament by defeating Billy Snaddon 9–3 in the final. Mehmet Husnu recorded a maximum break against Eddie Barker during qualifying for the tournament.

== Prize fund ==
The breakdown of prize money for this year is shown below:

Winner: £42,000
Runner-up: £21,000
Semi-final: £11,000
Quarter-final: £6,200
Last 16: £3,100
Last 32: £2,555

Highest break (televised): £2,500
Highest break (qualifying): £1,000

== Wildcard round ==
Match		Score	
WC1	Michael Holt (ENG)	5–3	Yang Jianyn (CHN)
WC2	Peter Lines (ENG)	1–5	Pang Weiguo (CHN)
WC3	Dave Finbow (ENG)	5–2	Pao Shan (CHN)
WC4	Anthony Davies (WAL)	5–4	Zhang Kai (CHN)

== Main draw ==
Last 32; Best of 9 frames
(Scotland) John Higgins	5
(Scotland) Jamie Burnett	4
(Wales) Matthew Stevens	5
(Canada) Alain Robidoux	0
(Wales) Paul Davies	5
(Malta) Tony Drago	0
(Wales) Mark Williams	5
(Wales) Dominic Dale	0
(Scotland) Alan McManus	5
(Scotland) Chris Small	3
(England) Mark King	5
(England) Paul Hunter	0
(Republic of Ireland) Ken Doherty	5
(England) Michael Holt	0
(England) Anthony Hamilton	5
(England) Jonathan Birch	2
(Scotland) Billy Snaddon	5
(Thailand) James Wattana	3
(England) Ronnie O'Sullivan	5
(England) Bradley Jones	3
(England) Stephen Lee	5
(Scotland) Drew Henry	1
(England) Peter Ebdon	5
(China) Pang Weiguo	3
(Scotland) Stephen Hendry	5
(Wales) Anthony Davies	2
(England) Steve Davis	5
(Australia) Quinten Hann	1
(England) John Parrott	5
(England) Dave Finbow	4
(England) Nigel Bond	5
(Northern Ireland) Joe Swail	0

Last 16; Best of 9 frames
(Scotland) John Higgins	5
(Wales) Matthew Stevens	0
(Wales) Paul Davies	5
(Wales) Mark Williams	2
(Scotland) Alan McManus	5
(England) Mark King	4
(Republic of Ireland) Ken Doherty	5
(England) Anthony Hamilton	3
(Scotland) Billy Snaddon	5
(England) Ronnie O'Sullivan	3
(England) Stephen Lee	5
(England) Peter Ebdon	3
(Scotland) Stephen Hendry	5
(England) Steve Davis	4
(England) John Parrott	5
(England) Nigel Bond	1

Quarter-finals; Best of 9 frames
(Scotland) John Higgins	5
(Wales) Paul Davies	2
(Scotland) Alan McManus	5
(Republic of Ireland) Ken Doherty	4
(Scotland) Billy Snaddon	5
(England) Stephen Lee	3
(Scotland) Stephen Hendry	5
(England) John Parrott	2

Semi-finals; Best of 11 frames
(Scotland) John Higgins	6
(Scotland) Alan McManus	4
(Scotland) Billy Snaddon	6
(Scotland) Stephen Hendry	2

Final; Best of 17 frames
(Scotland) John Higgins	9
(Scotland) Billy Snaddon	3
