= 1998–99 snooker season =

Details
- Duration: June 1998–16 May 1999
- Tournaments: 26 (9 ranking events)

Triple Crown winners
- UK Championship: (Scotland) John Higgins
- Masters: (Scotland) John Higgins
- World Championship: (Scotland) Stephen Hendry

The 1998–99 snooker season was a series of snooker tournaments played between June 1998 and May 1999. The following table outlines the results for the ranking and the invitational events.

== Calendar ==
=== World Snooker Tour ===
Start	Finish	Country	Tournament name	Venue	City	Winner	Runner-up	Score	Ref.
? Jun	? Jun	CHN	Super Challenge		Guangzhou	(England) Steve Davis	(Scotland) Stephen Hendry	(Note: No play-off was held and the title was decided on league table only.)	
8 Sep	10 Sep	CHN	Champions Super League		(Note: The event was played at three different venues in Shenyang, Xian and Beijing.)	(Scotland) Stephen Hendry	(Scotland) John Higgins		
29 Sep	4 Oct	SCO	Scottish Masters	Civic Centre	Motherwell	(England) Ronnie O'Sullivan	(Scotland) John Higgins	9–7	
14 Oct	25 Oct	ENG	Grand Prix	Guild Hall	Preston	(England) Stephen Lee	(Hong Kong) Marco Fu	9–2	
1 Nov	12 Nov	ENG	Benson & Hedges Championship	Willie Thorne Snooker Centre	Malvern	(England) David Gray	(England) Dave Harold	9–6	
16 Nov	29 Nov	ENG	UK Championship	Bournemouth International Centre	Bournemouth	(Scotland) John Higgins	(Wales) Matthew Stevens	10–6	
3 Dec	6 Dec	MLT	Malta Grand Prix	New Dolmen Hotel	Qawra	(Scotland) Stephen Hendry	(Republic of Ireland) Ken Doherty	7–6	
8 Dec	13 Dec	GER	German Masters	Best Western Rheinhotel	Bingen am Rhein	(England) John Parrott	(Wales) Mark Williams	6–4	
15 Dec	20 Dec	IRL	Irish Open	National Basketball Arena	Tallaght	(Wales) Mark Williams	(Scotland) Alan McManus	9–4	
16 Jan	24 Jan	ENG	Nations Cup	Telewest Arena	Newcastle upon Tyne	Wales	Scotland	6–4	
25 Jan	31 Jan	WAL	Welsh Open	Cardiff International Arena	Cardiff	(Wales) Mark Williams	(Scotland) Stephen Hendry	9–8	
7 Feb	14 Feb	ENG	The Masters	Wembley Conference Centre	London	(Scotland) John Higgins	(Republic of Ireland) Ken Doherty	10–8	
15 Feb	21 Feb	SCO	Scottish Open	A.E.C.C.	Aberdeen	(Scotland) Stephen Hendry	(Scotland) Graeme Dott	9–1	
25 Feb	28 Feb	ENG	Charity Challenge	Assembly Rooms	Derby	(Scotland) John Higgins	(England) Ronnie O'Sullivan	9–4	
1 Mar	7 Mar	THA	Thailand Masters	Ambassador Hotel	Bangkok	(Wales) Mark Williams	(Scotland) Alan McManus	9–7	
8 Mar	14 Mar	CHN	China International	JC Mandarin Hotel	Shanghai	(Scotland) John Higgins	(Scotland) Billy Snaddon	9–3	
23 Mar	28 Mar	IRL	Irish Masters	Goff's	Kill	(Scotland) Stephen Hendry	(England) Stephen Lee	9–8	
4 Apr	11 Apr	ENG	British Open	Plymouth Pavilions	Plymouth	(Republic of Ireland) Fergal O'Brien	(England) Anthony Hamilton	9–7	
17 Apr	3 May	ENG	World Snooker Championship	Crucible Theatre	Sheffield	(Scotland) Stephen Hendry	(Wales) Mark Williams	18–11	
2 Jan	16 May	ENG	Premier League	Magnet Leisure Centre	Maidenhead	(Scotland) John Higgins	(England) Jimmy White	9–4	
15 May	22 May	WAL	Pontins Professional	Pontins	Prestatyn	(England) Jimmy White	(Wales) Matthew Stevens	9–5	

Ranking event
Non-ranking event

=== UK Tour ===
Start	Finish	Country	Tournament name	Venue	City	Winner	Runner-up	Score	Ref.
5 Oct	7 Oct	ENG	UK Tour 1	Hazel Grove Snooker Club	Stockport	(England) Alfie Burden	(Wales) Anthony Davies	6–5	
27 Oct	29 Oct	ENG	UK Tour 2	Jesters Snooker Club	Swindon	(Northern Ireland) Joe Swail	(England) Alfie Burden	6–1	
22 Feb	24 Feb	ENG	UK Tour 3	Jesters Snooker Club	Swindon	(England) Stuart Bingham	(England) Matthew Couch	6–1	
12 Apr	14 Apr	ENG	UK Tour 4	Hazel Grove Snooker Club	Stockport	(Wales) James Reynolds	(England) Jason Ferguson	6–4	

=== Other events ===
Start	Finish	Country	Tournament name	Venue	City	Winner	Runner-up	Score	Ref.
6 Dec	19 Dec	THA	Asian Games	Land Sports Complex	Bangkok	(Pakistan) Shokat Ali	(Malaysia) Sam Chong	7–6	

== Official rankings ==
The top 16 of the world rankings, these players automatically played in the final rounds of the world ranking events and were invited for the Masters.

No.	Ch.	Player	Points 1996/1997	Points 1997/1998	Total
1	▲	(Scotland) John Higgins	19587	27835	47422
2	▼	(Scotland) Stephen Hendry	30457	16790	47247
3	▲	(England) Ronnie O'Sullivan	18302	21105	39407
4	▼	(Republic of Ireland) Ken Doherty	21072	15095	36167
5	▼	(Wales) Mark Williams	21420	11335	32755
6	Steady	(England) John Parrott	16422	15335	31757
7	▼	(England) Peter Ebdon	15086	10340	25426
8	▲	(Scotland) Alan McManus	13639	10755	24394
9	▲	(England) Stephen Lee	11384	12880	24264
10	▲	(Malta) Tony Drago	14504	9305	23809
11	▲	(England) Anthony Hamilton	11764	10760	22524
12	▼	(Canada) Alain Robidoux	16597	5790	22387
13	▼	(England) Nigel Bond	14106	8150	22256
14	▼	(England) Steve Davis	13077	9175	22252
15	▼	(Thailand) James Wattana	13177	8365	21542
16	▲	(England) Mark King	10520	10950	21470

== Points distribution ==
1998/1999 points distribution for world ranking events:

Tournament	Round →	L256	L198	L166	L134	L102	L96	L64	L48	L32	L16	QF	SF	F	W
Grand Prix	Unseeded loser	–	200	270	360	480	480	640	–	855	1140	1520	2025	3040	4560
Grand Prix	Seeded loser	–	–	200	270	360	360	480	–	–	–	–	–	–	–
UK Championship	Unseeded loser	–	270	360	480	640	640	855	–	1140	1520	2025	2700	4050	6075
UK Championship	Seeded loser	–	–	270	360	480	480	640	–	–	–	–	–	–	–
Irish Open	Unseeded loser	–	200	270	360	480	480	640	855	1140	1330	1520	2025	3040	4560
Irish Open	Seeded loser	–	–	200	270	360	360	–	640	855	–	–	–	–	–
Welsh Open	Unseeded loser	–	200	270	360	480	480	640	–	855	1140	1520	2025	3040	4560
Welsh Open	Seeded loser	–	–	200	270	360	360	480	–	–	–	–	–	–	–
Scottish Open	Unseeded loser	–	200	270	360	480	480	640	–	855	1140	1520	2025	3040	4560
Scottish Open	Seeded loser	–	–	200	270	360	360	480	–	–	–	–	–	–	–
China International	Unseeded loser	–	200	270	360	480	480	640	855	1140	1330	1520	2025	3040	4560
China International	Seeded loser	–	–	200	270	360	360	–	640	855	–	–	–	–	–
Thailand Masters	Unseeded loser	–	200	270	360	480	480	640	855	1140	1330	1520	2025	3040	4560
Thailand Masters	Seeded loser	–	–	200	270	360	360	–	640	855	–	–	–	–	–
British Open	Unseeded loser	–	200	270	360	480	480	640	–	855	1140	1520	2025	3040	4560
British Open	Seeded loser	–	–	200	270	360	360	480	–	–	–	–	–	–	–
World Championship	Unseeded loser	270	360	480	640	855	855	1140	1520	2027	2360	2700	3600	5400	8100
World Championship	Seeded loser	200	–	360	480	640	640	–	1140	1520	–	–	–	–	–
