= 2005 China Open (snooker) =

China Open
Tournament information
- Dates: 26 March – 3 April 2005
- Venue: Haidian Stadium
- City: Beijing
- Country: China
- Organisation: WPBSA
- Format: Ranking event
- Total prize fund: £200,000
- Winner's share: £30,000
- Highest break: Paul Hunter (ENG) (140)

Final
- Champion: Ding Junhui (CHN)
- Runner-up: Stephen Hendry (SCO)
- Score: 9–5

The 2005 China Open was a professional ranking snooker tournament that took place from 26 March to 3 April 2005 at the Haidian Stadium in Beijing, China. It was the penultimate ranking event of the 2004–05 season, preceding the 2005 World Championship.

The event was last held in 2002, where Mark Williams won the tournament by defeating Anthony Hamilton 9–8.

Ding Junhui won in the final 9–5 against Stephen Hendry. Ding became the second youngest player after Ronnie O'Sullivan to capture a ranking title. Along with several other Chinese players, Ding gave up his normal tournament entry position in order to accept an offer to enter the tournament as a wild-card player and thus he did not receive either prize money or ranking points for his tournament win.

== Prize fund ==
The breakdown of prize money for this year is shown below:

Winner: £30,000
Runner-up: £15,000
Semi-final: £7,500
Quarter-final: £5,600
Last 16: £4,000
Last 32: £2,500
Last 48: £1,625
Last 64: £1,100

Stage one highest break: £500
Stage two highest break: £2,000

Stage one maximum break: £1,000
Stage two maximum break: £20,000

== Wildcard round ==
Match		Score	
WC1	Dave Harold (ENG)	5–3	Xiao Guodong (CHN)
WC2	Gerard Greene (NIR)	1–5	Kobkit Palajin (THA)
WC3	Stuart Bingham (ENG)	5–1	Cao Kaisheng (CHN)
WC4	Mark Davis (ENG)	2–5	Ding Junhui (CHN)
WC5	Quinten Hann (AUS)	5–1	Guo Hua (CHN)
WC6	Jimmy Michie (ENG)	3–5	Habib Subah (BHR)
WC7	Barry Pinches (ENG)	5–3	Yang Qingtian (CHN)
WC8	Ali Carter (ENG)	5–1	Cao Xinlong (CHN)

Match		Score	
WC9	Robert Milkins (ENG)	5–3	Liu Song (CHN)
WC10	Ryan Day (WAL)	5–3	Jin Long (CHN)
WC11	Michael Holt (ENG)	5–3	Cai Jianzhong (CHN)
WC12	Ricky Walden (ENG)	5–2	Pang Weiguo (CHN)
WC13	Tom Ford (ENG)	5–3	Zheng Peng (CHN)
WC14	Anthony Hamilton (ENG)	5–1	Zang Dongtao (CHN)
WC15	Adrian Gunnell (ENG)	5–1	Zhang Kai (CHN)
WC16	Nigel Bond (ENG)	4–5	Liang Wenbo (CHN)

== Main draw ==
Last 32; Best of 9 frames
1	(England) Ronnie O'Sullivan	w/d
(England) Dave Harold	w/o
16	(Hong Kong) Marco Fu	5
(Thailand) Kobkit Palajin	3
15	(Scotland) Graeme Dott	3
(England) Stuart Bingham	5
8	(England) Peter Ebdon	0
(China) Ding Junhui	5
7	(Republic of Ireland) Ken Doherty	5
(Australia) Quinten Hann	2
9	(England) Stephen Lee	5
(Bahrain) Habib Subah	0
11	(England) Jimmy White	5
(England) Barry Pinches	3
4	(England) Paul Hunter	5
(England) Ali Carter	4
3	(Scotland) Stephen Hendry	5
(England) Robert Milkins	1
14	(England) David Gray	1
(Wales) Ryan Day	5
13	(England) Steve Davis	5
(England) Michael Holt	0
6	(Wales) Matthew Stevens	3
(England) Ricky Walden	5
5	(Scotland) John Higgins	5
(England) Tom Ford	1
10	(Scotland) Alan McManus	5
(England) Anthony Hamilton	4
12	(Scotland) Chris Small	3
(England) Adrian Gunnell	5
2	(Wales) Mark Williams	5
(China) Liang Wenbo	0

Last 16; Best of 9 frames
(England) Dave Harold	3
16	(Hong Kong) Marco Fu	5
(England) Stuart Bingham	4
(China) Ding Junhui	5
7	(Republic of Ireland) Ken Doherty	5
9	(England) Stephen Lee	3
11	(England) Jimmy White	3
4	(England) Paul Hunter	5
3	(Scotland) Stephen Hendry	5
(Wales) Ryan Day	1
13	(England) Steve Davis	0
(England) Ricky Walden	3*
5	(Scotland) John Higgins	2
10	(Scotland) Alan McManus	5
(England) Adrian Gunnell	2
2	(Wales) Mark Williams	5

Quarter-finals; Best of 9 frames
16	(Hong Kong) Marco Fu	2
(China) Ding Junhui	5
7	(Republic of Ireland) Ken Doherty	5
4	(England) Paul Hunter	1
3	(Scotland) Stephen Hendry	5
(England) Ricky Walden	0
10	(Scotland) Alan McManus	5
2	(Wales) Mark Williams	2

Semi-finals; Best of 11 frames
(China) Ding Junhui	6
7	(Republic of Ireland) Ken Doherty	0
3	(Scotland) Stephen Hendry	6
10	(Scotland) Alan McManus	4

Final; Best of 19 frames
(China) Ding Junhui	9
3	(Scotland) Stephen Hendry	5

* Steve Davis conceded match due to illness

== Final ==
Final: Best of 17 frames. Referee: Paul Collier. Haidian Stadium, Beijing, China, April 2, 2005.
Ding Junhui; China	9–5	Stephen Hendry (3); Scotland
Afternoon: 1–108 (92), 10–108 (108), 103–30 (65), 8–86, 0–71 (57), 84–0 (84), 63–31; Evening: 46–31, 109–11 (107), 1–61, 56–26, 79–30 (53), 103–34 (87), 106–0 (103)
107	Highest break	108
2	Century breaks	1
6	50+ breaks	3

== Qualifying ==
Qualifying for the tournament took place at Pontin's in Prestatyn, Wales between January 25–28, 2005.

Round 1 Best of 9 frames
(England) Andrew Norman	w/o
(England) David Hall	w/d
(England) Craig Butler	w/o
(China) Liu Song	w/d
(Republic of Ireland) Joe Delaney	2
(England) David McDonnell	5
(Wales) Darren Morgan	5
(England) Ben Woollaston	2
(England) Alfie Burden	4
(England) Mike Hallett	5
(England) Rory McLeod	5
(England) Brian Salmon	0
(England) Paul Wykes	1
(England) Gary Wilson	5
(Wales) Paul Davies	5
(Scotland) Hugh Abernethy	0
(Pakistan) Shokat Ali	5
(England) Steve James	0
(Northern Ireland) Sean O'Neill	5
(Netherlands) Stefan Mazrocis	1
(England) Ricky Walden	5
(England) Paul Davison	1
(England) Tom Ford	w/o
(England) Mark Gray	w/d
(England) Simon Bedford	4
(England) Adam Davies	5
(Scotland) Scott MacKenzie	3
(England) Joe Jogia	5
(Republic of Ireland) Leo Fernandez	5
(Republic of Ireland) Rodney Goggins	4

Round 2 Best of 9 frames
(Australia) Neil Robertson	5
(England) Andrew Norman	1
(Wales) Lee Walker
Bye
(England) Gary Wilkinson	5
(England) Craig Butler	2
(England) Rod Lawler	5
(England) David McDonnell	4
(England) Nick Walker	3
(Wales) Darren Morgan	5
(England) Jimmy Michie	5
(England) Mike Hallett	1
(Scotland) Jamie Burnett	5
(England) Rory McLeod	1
(England) Sean Storey	4
(England) Gary Wilson	5
(England) Jonathan Birch	3
(Wales) Paul Davies	5
(Scotland) Marcus Campbell	5
(Pakistan) Shokat Ali	4
(England) Mike Dunn	4
(Northern Ireland) Sean O'Neill	5
(Belgium) Bjorn Haneveer	4
(England) Ricky Walden	5
(England) David Roe	3
(England) Tom Ford	5
(England) Andy Hicks	5
(England) Adam Davies	2
(England) Adrian Gunnell	5
(England) Joe Jogia	3
(Wales) Anthony Davies	5
(Republic of Ireland) Leo Fernandez	2

Round 3 Best of 9 frames
(England) Dave Harold	5
(Australia) Neil Robertson	1
(England) Shaun Murphy	5
(Wales) Lee Walker	3
(England) Stuart Bingham	5
(England) Gary Wilkinson	1
(England) Mark Davis	5
(England) Rod Lawler	3
(England) Brian Morgan	1
(Wales) Darren Morgan	5
(Republic of Ireland) Michael Judge	1
(England) Jimmy Michie	5
(England) Nick Dyson	3
(Scotland) Jamie Burnett	5
(England) Mark Selby	5
(England) Gary Wilson	3
(Thailand) James Wattana	4
(Wales) Paul Davies	5
(Wales) Ryan Day	5
(Scotland) Marcus Campbell	4
(Northern Ireland) Patrick Wallace	4
(Northern Ireland) Sean O'Neill	5
(Finland) Robin Hull	3
(England) Ricky Walden	5
(England) Stuart Pettman	1
(England) Tom Ford	5
(Republic of Ireland) Fergal O'Brien	5
(England) Andy Hicks	3
(England) Barry Hawkins	3
(England) Adrian Gunnell	5
(England) Nigel Bond	5
(Wales) Anthony Davies	3

Round 4 Best of 9 frames
(Scotland) Stephen Maguire	1
(England) Dave Harold	5
(Northern Ireland) Gerard Greene	5
(England) Shaun Murphy	3
(England) Mark King	2
(England) Stuart Bingham	5
(Malta) Tony Drago	1
(England) Mark Davis	5
(Australia) Quinten Hann	5
(Wales) Darren Morgan	2
(Wales) Dominic Dale	2
(England) Jimmy Michie	5
(England) Barry Pinches	5
(Scotland) Jamie Burnett	4
(England) Ali Carter	5
(England) Mark Selby	1
(England) Robert Milkins	5
(Wales) Paul Davies	2
(Northern Ireland) Joe Swail	2
(Wales) Ryan Day	5
(England) Michael Holt	5
(Northern Ireland) Sean O'Neill	1
(Scotland) Drew Henry	0
(England) Ricky Walden	5
(England) Joe Perry	2
(England) Tom Ford	5
(England) Anthony Hamilton	5
(Republic of Ireland) Fergal O'Brien	3
(England) John Parrott	2
(England) Adrian Gunnell	5
(England) Ian McCulloch	4
(England) Nigel Bond	5

== Century breaks ==
=== Qualifying stage centuries ===
- 139, 108 – Anthony Hamilton
- 130, 117, 105 – Robert Milkins
- 127, 101 – Darren Morgan
- 125 – Gerard Greene
- 120 – Mark Davis
- 119 – Neil Robertson
- 117 – Tom Ford
- 114, 105, 102 – Adrian Gunnell
- 112 – Ali Carter
- 111 – Sean O'Neill
- 108 – Gary Wilkinson
- 105 – Paul Davison
- 104, 101 – Nigel Bond
- 103 – Mike Hallett
- 100 – Ryan Day

=== Televised stage centuries ===
- 140 – Paul Hunter
- 139, 103 – Michael Holt
- 138, 113 – John Higgins
- 135, 129, 126, 117, 107 – Ding Junhui
- 135 – Ricky Walden
- 135 – Stephen Lee
- 134 – Quinten Hann
- 123 – Kobkit Palajin
- 122 – Barry Pinches
- 117, 114, 102, 101 – Mark Williams
- 114, 112, 109, 108 – Stephen Hendry
- 113 – Ken Doherty
- 104 – Tom Ford
