= 1998 Thailand Masters =

Thailand Masters
Tournament information
- Dates: 7–15 March 1998
- Venue: Imperial Queens Park Hotel
- City: Bangkok
- Country: Thailand
- Organisation: WPBSA
- Format: Ranking event
- Total prize fund: £280,000
- Winner's share: £50,000
- Highest break: John Parrott (ENG) (138)

Final
- Champion: Stephen Hendry (SCO)
- Runner-up: John Parrott (ENG)
- Score: 9–6

The 1998 Beer Chang Thailand Masters was a professional ranking snooker tournament that took place between 7–15 March 1998 at the Imperial Queens Park Hotel in Bangkok, Thailand.

Stephen Hendry won the tournament, defeating John Parrott 9–6 in the final. The defending champion, Peter Ebdon, was eliminated by Parrott in the quarter-finals. This win gave Hendry his 29th ranking title, surpassing the previous record of 28 held by Steve Davis.

== Wildcard round ==
Match		Score	
WC1	Marco Fu (HKG)	5–2	Jason Ferguson (ENG)
WC2	Stuart Pettman (ENG)	5–1	Kwan Poomjang (THA)
WC3	David Gray (ENG)	5–3	Guo Hua (CHN)
WC4	Jonathan Birch (ENG)	5–1	Rom Saraburi (THA)

== Main draw ==
Last 32; Best of 9 frames
(England) Peter Ebdon	5
(England) Gary Wilkinson	3
(Wales) Darren Morgan	2
(Scotland) Graeme Dott	5
(England) Stephen Lee	5
(England) Andy Hicks	3
(England) John Parrott	5
(Hong Kong) Marco Fu	3
(England) Nigel Bond	5
(England) Neal Foulds	4
(England) Steve Davis	5
(England) Steve James	1
(England) Anthony Hamilton	5
(Scotland) Chris Small	3
(Scotland) John Higgins	3
(Republic of Ireland) Fergal O'Brien	5
(Scotland) Stephen Hendry	5
(England) Jimmy White	2
(Malta) Tony Drago	5
(England) Stuart Pettman	1
(Canada) Alain Robidoux	4
(England) Martin Clark	5
(Wales) Mark Williams	5
(England) Dave Harold	2
(England) Ronnie O'Sullivan	5
(England) David Gray	1
(Scotland) Alan McManus	5
(England) Jonathan Birch	4
(Thailand) James Wattana	5
(Northern Ireland) Joe Swail	1
(Republic of Ireland) Ken Doherty	5
(England) Mark King	0

Last 16; Best of 9 frames
(England) Peter Ebdon	5
(Scotland) Graeme Dott	4
(England) Stephen Lee	3
(England) John Parrott	5
(England) Nigel Bond	5
(England) Steve Davis	3
(England) Anthony Hamilton	5
(Republic of Ireland) Fergal O'Brien	0
(Scotland) Stephen Hendry	5
(Malta) Tony Drago	1
(England) Martin Clark	3
(Wales) Mark Williams	5
(England) Ronnie O'Sullivan	1
(Scotland) Alan McManus	5
(Thailand) James Wattana	4
(Republic of Ireland) Ken Doherty	5

Quarter-finals; Best of 9 frames
(England) Peter Ebdon	0
(England) John Parrott	5
(England) Nigel Bond	2
(England) Anthony Hamilton	5
(Scotland) Stephen Hendry	5
(Wales) Mark Williams	4
(Scotland) Alan McManus	3
(Republic of Ireland) Ken Doherty	5

Semi-finals; Best of 9 frames
(England) John Parrott	5
(England) Anthony Hamilton	4
(Scotland) Stephen Hendry	5
(Republic of Ireland) Ken Doherty	4

Final; Best of 17 frames
(England) John Parrott	6
(Scotland) Stephen Hendry	9

== Final ==
Final: Best of 17 frames. Imperial Queens Park Hotel, Bangkok, Thailand. 15 March 1998.
Stephen Hendry; Scotland	9–6	John Parrott; England
Afternoon: 133–0 (133), 66–2, 69–12, 73–32, 137–0 (137), 33–68, 0–138 (138), 68–36; Evening: 1–88 (53), 26–90, 67–63 (51), 9–122 (113), 30–83, 103–4 (103), 75–39
137	Highest break	138
3	Century breaks	2
4	50+ breaks	3
