= 1996 Guangzhou Masters =

Tournament information
- Dates: 15–18 January 1996
- City: Guangzhou
- Country: China
- Organisation: WPBSA
- Format: Non-ranking event
- Total prize fund: £11,000
- Winner's share: £11,000

Final
- Champion: (Malta) Tony Drago
- Runner-up: (England) Steve Davis
- Score: 6–2

The 1996 Guangzhou Masters was a non-ranking invitational snooker tournament held by the WPBSA, which took place from 15 to 18 January 1996. The tournament was played in Guangzhou, China, and featured five professional players - Steve Davis, Peter Ebdon, Tony Drago, David Roe and Guo Hua - alongside three Chinese amateurs - He Ching Yi, Pang Weiguo and Tao Yan.

Drago won the tournament, his second and final professional title, beating Davis 6–2 in the final. All of the amateur players lost their opening matches.

== Main draw ==
Quarter-finals; Best of 9 frames
(England) Steve Davis | 5
(China) He Ching Yi | 1
(England) David Roe | 3
(China) Guo Hua | 5
(Malta) Tony Drago | 5
(China) Pang Weiguo | 0
(England) Peter Ebdon | 5
(China) Tao Yan | 0

Semi-finals; Best of 11 frames
(England) Steve Davis | 6
(China) Guo Hua | 1
(Malta) Tony Drago | 6
(England) Peter Ebdon | 3

Final; Best of 11 frames
(England) Steve Davis | 2
(Malta) Tony Drago | 6
