= 1998 Champions Super League =

Red Bull Champions Super League
Tournament information
- Dates: 8–10 September 1998
- City: Shenyang; Xi'an; Beijing
- Country: China
- Organisation: CBSA
- Format: Non-ranking event
- Winner's share: £12,000
- Highest break: John Higgins (SCO) (127)

Final
- Champion: Stephen Hendry (SCO)
- Runner-up: John Higgins (SCO)
- Score: Round-Robin

The 1998 Red Bull Champions Super League was a professional non-ranking snooker tournament that took place in September 1998 in three cities in China – Shenyang, Xi'an and Beijing.

This one-off event was held as a six-man round robin, similar to the Red Bull Super Challenge held earlier in the summer. The line-up was similar apart from John Higgins who replaced James Wattana and Au Chi-wai came in for Marco Fu. The group was won by Hendry. Higgins made the highest break of the tournament, 127, in the fifth frame of his match against Hendry.

== Round-robin ==
3 points for victory & 1 point for every frame won

POS	Player	Played	Won	Lost	FW	FL	FD	Points
Winner	Stephen Hendry (SCO)	5	4	1	17	8	+9	29
Runner-up	John Higgins (SCO)	5	3	2	15	10	+5	24
3	Steve Davis (ENG)	5	3	2	12	13	−1	21
4	Guo Hua (CHN)	5	3	2	11	14	-3	20
5	Au Chi-wai (HKG)	5	1	4	11	14	−3	14
6	Pang Weiguo (CHN)	5	1	4	9	16	−7	12
