= 1997 China International =

Catch China International
Tournament information
- Dates: 17–20 September 1997
- City: Beijing
- Country: China
- Organisation: WPBSA
- Format: Non-ranking event
- Winner's share: £10,000
- Highest break: (Thailand) James Wattana (147)

Final
- Champion: (England) Steve Davis
- Runner-up: (England) Jimmy White
- Score: 7–4

The 1997 Catch China International was a professional non-ranking snooker tournament that took place from 17 to 20 September 1997 in Beijing, China. It featured a mixture of top sixteen stars and local Chinese players.

Steve Davis won the tournament by defeating Jimmy White 7–4 in the final.

== Main draw ==
Round 1 Best of 7 frames
(England) Steve Davis	4
(China) Hasimu Tuerxun	0
(China) Pang Weiguo	4
(China) Xu Xinjian	1
(China) Guo Hua	4
(China) Da Hailin	0
(England) Jimmy White	4
(China) Gao Feng	3

Quarter-finals; Best of 9 frames
(Scotland) Stephen Hendry	0
(England) Steve Davis	5
(Thailand) James Wattana	5
(China) Pang Weiguo	4
(England) Ronnie O'Sullivan	5
(China) Guo Hua	1
(Wales) Mark Williams	3
(England) Jimmy White	5

Semi-finals; Best of 11 frames
(England) Steve Davis	6
(Thailand) James Wattana	1
(England) Ronnie O'Sullivan	0
(England) Jimmy White	6

Final; Best of 13 frames
(England) Steve Davis	7
(England) Jimmy White	4
