= 1997 Superstar International =

Superstar International
Tournament information
- Dates: 14–16 August 1997
- Venue: Guangdong Hotel
- City: Guangzhou
- Country: China
- Format: Non-ranking event
- Winner's share: £10,000

Final
- Champion: (England) Ronnie O'Sullivan
- Runner-up: (England) Jimmy White
- Score: 5–3

The 1997 Riley Superstar International was a professional non-ranking snooker tournament that took place between 14 and 16 August 1997 at the Guangdong Hotel, Guangzhou, China.

Ronnie O'Sullivan won in the final 5–3 against Jimmy White.

== First group stage ==
=== Group 1 ===
POS	Player	MP	MW	FW	FL	FD	PTS
1	(Republic of Ireland) Ken Doherty	2	2	4	0	+4	2
2	(China) Guo Hua	2	1	2	2	0	1
3	(Malaysia) Keith E Boon	2	0	0	4	−4	0

- Ken Doherty 2–0 Keith Boon
- Guo Hua 2–0 Keith Boon
- Ken Doherty 2–0 Guo Hua

=== Group 2 ===
POS	Player	MP	MW	FW	FL	FD	PTS
1	(China) Hasimu Tuerxun	2	1	3	2	+1	1
2	(Thailand) James Wattana	2	1	3	3	0	1
3	(China) Gao Feng	2	1	2	3	−1	0

- James Wattana 2–1 Hasimu Tuerxun
- Hasimu Tuerxun 2–0 Gao Feng
- Gao Feng 2–1 James Wattana

=== Group 3 ===
POS	Player	MP	MW	FW	FL	FD	PTS
1	(England) Jimmy White	2	2	4	1	+3	2
2	(China) Xu Xinjian	2	1	3	3	0	1
3	(China) Li Jin	2	0	1	4	−3	0

- Jimmy White 2–1 Xu Xinjian
- Xu Xinjian 2–1 Li Jin
- Jimmy White 2–0 Li Jin

=== Group 4 ===
POS	Player	MP	MW	FW	FL	FD	PTS
1	(China) Pang Weiguo	2	2	4	0	+4	2
2	(England) Ronnie O'Sullivan	2	1	2	2	0	1
3	(China) Li Zong	2	0	0	4	−4	0

- Pang Weiguo 2–0 Ronnie O'Sullivan
- Pang Weiguo 2–0 Li Zong
- Ronnie O'Sullivan 2–0 Li Zong

== Second group stage ==
=== Group 1 ===
POS	Player	MP	MW	FW	FL	FD	PTS
1	(China) Guo Hua	3	2	8	5	+3	2
2	(Republic of Ireland) Ken Doherty	3	2	8	5	+3	2
3	(Thailand) James Wattana	3	2	8	6	+2	2
4	(China) Hasimu Tuerxun	2	0	1	9	−8	0

- Ken Doherty 3–0 Hasimu Tuerxun
- James Wattana 3–2 Guo Hua
- Ken Doherty 3–2 James Wattana
- Guo Hua 3–0 Hasimu Tuerxun
- Guo Hua 3–2 Ken Doherty
- James Wattana 3–1 Hasimu Tuerxun

=== Group 2 ===
POS	Player	MP	MW	FW	FL	FD	PTS
1	(England) Jimmy White	3	2	8	5	+3	2
2	(England) Ronnie O'Sullivan	3	2	7	5	+2	2
3	(China) Pang Weiguo	3	2	7	5	+2	2
4	(China) Xu Xinjian	2	0	2	7	−8	0

- Pang Weiguo 3–2 Jimmy White
- Ronnie O'Sullivan 3–1 Xu Xinjian
- Jimmy White 3–1 Ronnie O'Sullivan
- Pang Weiguo 3–0 Xu Xinjian
- Jimmy White 3–1 Xu Xinjian
- Ronnie O'Sullivan 3–1 Pang Weiguo

- O'Sullivan progressed on a head-to-head basis by winning his match against Pang Weiguo

== Knockout stage ==
Semi-finals; Best of 7 frames
(England) Ronnie O'Sullivan	4
(China) Guo Hua	1
(England) Jimmy White	4
(Republic of Ireland) Ken Doherty	0

Final; Best of 9 frames
(England) Ronnie O'Sullivan	5
(England) Jimmy White	3
