= 1998 Super Challenge =

Red Bull Super Challenge
Tournament information
- Dates: June 1998
- City: Guangzhou
- Country: China
- Organisation: WPBSA
- Format: Non-ranking event
- Winner's share: £12,000
- Highest break: Marco Fu (CHN), 138

Final
- Champion: Steve Davis (ENG)
- Runner-up: Stephen Hendry (SCO)
- Score: Round-Robin

The 1998 Red Bull Super Challenge was a professional non-ranking snooker tournament that took place in June 1998 in Guangzhou, China.

This one-off event was held as a six-man round robin. The players who competed were Steve Davis, Stephen Hendry, James Wattana plus three local stars who had yet to establish themselves as professionals, Marco Fu, Pang Weiguo and Guo Hua. Davis and Hendry had identical records but Davis took the title as he had beaten Hendry in their individual match. Fu made the highest break of the tournament, 138.

== Round-robin ==
Position	Player	Played	Won	Lost	FW	FL	Points	Prize money
Winner	Steve Davis (ENG)	5	4	1	16	9	28*	£12,000
Runner-up	Stephen Hendry (SCO)	5	4	1	16	9	28	£8,000
3	James Wattana (THA)	5	3	2	12	13	21	£5,000
4	(China) Pang Weiguo	5	2	3	12	13	18	£750
5	Marco Fu (HKG)	5	1	4	11	14	14	£750
6	Guo Hua (CHN)	5	1	4	8	17	11	£750

* Steve Davis won the title on head to head results after beating Stephen Hendry 3–2.
