= Pang Weiguo =

Chinese snooker player (born 1972)

Personal information
- Born: 28 September 1972 (age 54) Beijing, China

Sport
- Country: China
- Sport: Snooker
- Professional: 2002/2003
- Highest ranking: 117 (2002/2003)
- Best ranking finish: Last 32 (x1)

Pang Weiguo (Chinese: 庞卫国; born 28 September 1972) is a Chinese former professional snooker player.
