= 2001 Scottish Masters =

Regal Scottish Masters
Tournament information
- Dates: 18–23 September 2001
- Venue: Thistle Hotel
- City: Glasgow
- Country: Scotland
- Organisation: WPBSA
- Format: Non-Ranking event
- Total prize fund: £200,000
- Winner's share: £63,000
- Highest break: Ronnie O'Sullivan (ENG) (134)

Final
- Champion: John Higgins (SCO)
- Runner-up: Ronnie O'Sullivan (ENG)
- Score: 9–6

The 2001 Scottish Masters (known as the 2001 Regal Scottish Masters for sponsorship reasons) was a professional non-ranking snooker tournament which took place at the Thistle Hotel in Glasgow, Scotland, from 18 to 23 September 2001. It was the first time the tournament was played in Glasgow since the 1989 edition. The competition was the second of four invitational World Professional Billiards and Snooker Association (WPBSA) events of the 2001–02 season. It was broadcast on BBC Scotland and Eurosport and was sponsored by the cigarette brand Regal.

John Higgins, the top-ranked Scottish player, won the tournament, defeating the defending champion and world title holder Ronnie O'Sullivan 9–6 in the final. It was the first time that Higgins had won the competition it was the 22nd ranking tournament victory of his career. He earned £63,000 from a prize fund pool of £200,000. O'Sullivan made the highest break of the competition of 134 in his semi-final victory over Marco Fu.

== Background ==
The Scottish Masters was an invitational professional snooker tournament first contested in 1981. The 2001 competition was the second of four invitational World Professional Billiards and Snooker Association (WPBSA) events of the 2001–02 season and was held from 18 to 23 September at the Thistle Hotel in Glasgow, Scotland. It followed the 2001 Champions Cup. This was the first time since the 1989 edition that the tournament took place in Glasgow. Sponsored by the cigarette brand Regal, it had a total prize fund of £200,000, and was televised on BBC Scotland and Eurosport. It was also broadcast on the 110Sport website with coverage provided by BBC Scotland.

The 12-player event included those who were ranked in positions one to eight in the world rankings, players who had won major tournaments from the 2000–01 season, and one qualifier. Any player who withdrew would be replaced by a reserve. The field included the tournament's defending champion Ronnie O'Sullivan and former Scottish Masters victors Stephen Hendry, Ken Doherty and Matthew Stevens. Patrick Wallace, a quarter-finalist in the 2001 world championship, qualified for the tournament by winning the Scottish Masters qualifying competition. John Higgins, Scotland's highest-ranked player and world number three, thought about withdrawing from the tournament because his wife was due to give birth to their first child imminently. (Note: His first was ultimately born on 30 September 2001.) She did not allow him to do so. The maximum number of frames in a match increased from nine in the first round to eleven in the quarter and semi-finals, leading up to the final which was played as the best-of-17 frames.

=== Prize fund ===
The breakdown of prize money for the tournament was as follows:

- Winner: £63,000
- Runner-up: £31,000
- Semi-final (×2): £16,000
- Highest break (×1): £5,000
- Maximum break: Vauxhall Astra Coupé
- Total: £200,000

== Tournament summary ==
=== Round 1 ===
The first round of the competition took place from 18 to 19 September and was played as best-of-nine frame matches. Marco Fu, the world number 17, defeated two-time ranking event winner Peter Ebdon 5–2. Tied at 2–2 at the mid-session interval after a break of 126, Ebdon lost the next three frames to Fu whose highest break was a 38. Fu said he felt Ebdon had frustrated himself and that the match helped him to refine his playing ability. Hendry, who was coached by the 1979 world champion Terry Griffiths after ending his partnership with coach Frank Callan, played Jimmy White. He accumulated 13 points as White won the first three frames with breaks of no more than 74. Hendry won frame four after White missed the yellow ball and made two half-centuries to level the match at 3–3. After White made it 4–3, Hendry took frames eight and nine to claim a 5–4 victory.

Stephen Lee, the world number eight, took 76 minutes to whitewash Wallace 5–0 and outscored his opponent 392–61. He used his post-match press conference to threaten a withdrawal from England's World Cup team unless Ebdon apologised for his celebrations after his 13–12 victory over Lee in the second round of the 2001 world championship, saying, "The way he reacted anyone would have thought he had won the title or was going to pick up the FA Cup." World number six Stevens defeated the 2001 Masters champion Paul Hunter 5–2 in his third try against him. The match was tied at 1–1 with a break of 66 from Stevens and a 69 from Hunter. Stevens won three successive frames, which included a clearance to the yellow and black balls in frame three and the fourth from the green ball to the pink ball. Hunter took frame five before Stevens made breaks of 60 and 57 to win the match.

=== Quarter-finals ===
The four quarter-finals were played as best-of-11 frames between 20 and 21 September. Fu played former world champion Doherty in the first quarter-final. Doherty took a 2–1 lead and held it until Fu compiled a 90 break from a fluke to go 3–2 ahead. Doherty levelled the score at 3–3, but he was inconsistent and Fu won the match 6–3. The defending world champion O'Sullivan competed against Stevens. O'Sullivan was behind 2–1 when he produced breaks of 108 and 101 en route to a 5–2 lead. Stevens claimed frame eight with a break of 70 before O'Sullivan secured a 6–3 victory in the ninth frame. O'Sullivan said afterwards he had anticipated a tighter match after both players made errors: "I'm happy with the centuries and I don't want to give the title up without a fight."

Mark Williams, a former world champion, was drawn to play Lee. The two players shared the opening four frames as Williams' highest breaks were 59 and 56 and Lee's were 90, 86 and 82. Lee was unable to tie the match at 4–4 because he left Williams with a snooker on the brown ball and went in-off on the pink and then missed the black to allow Williams to win 6–3. The final quarter-final was contested between the Scottish duo of Higgins and Hendry. The first frame was won by Hendry; Higgins then won three frames in a row to lead 3–1 at the mid-session interval. Hendry claimed two more frames to tie the match, before Higgins won 6–3 with breaks of 70, 44 and 50. Higgins said after the game that with the impending birth of his child his mindset was not "100 per cent on practice", while Hendry expressed frustration that "I had 20 chances to go 4–3 up but I couldn't take them."

=== Semi-finals ===
The best-of-11 frame semi-finals were held on 22 September. The first was between O'Sullivan and Fu. O'Sullivan held a mid-session lead of 3–1 after breaks of 46 and 58 and a total clearance of 134, the tournament's highest break. Fu won frame five after O'Sullivan went in-off on several red balls. A break of 71 and a clearance from the second-to-last red to the pink gave O'Sullivan a 5–2 lead. He look set to win 6–2 before he failed to pot the blue ball into a middle pocket while on a break of 39. Fu made a reply break of 50 and O'Sullivan took a 6–3 win with a 77 break in the ninth frame. Post-match, O'Sullivan said a lack of pre-tournament form made him consider withdrawal, but his father advised him to go holidaying beforehand. He said he felt nervous because he thought he would lose the match: "That was horrible. I don't think I've played as solidly this time as I did when I won the title here last year. Maybe that's because I'm a little bit match-rusty."

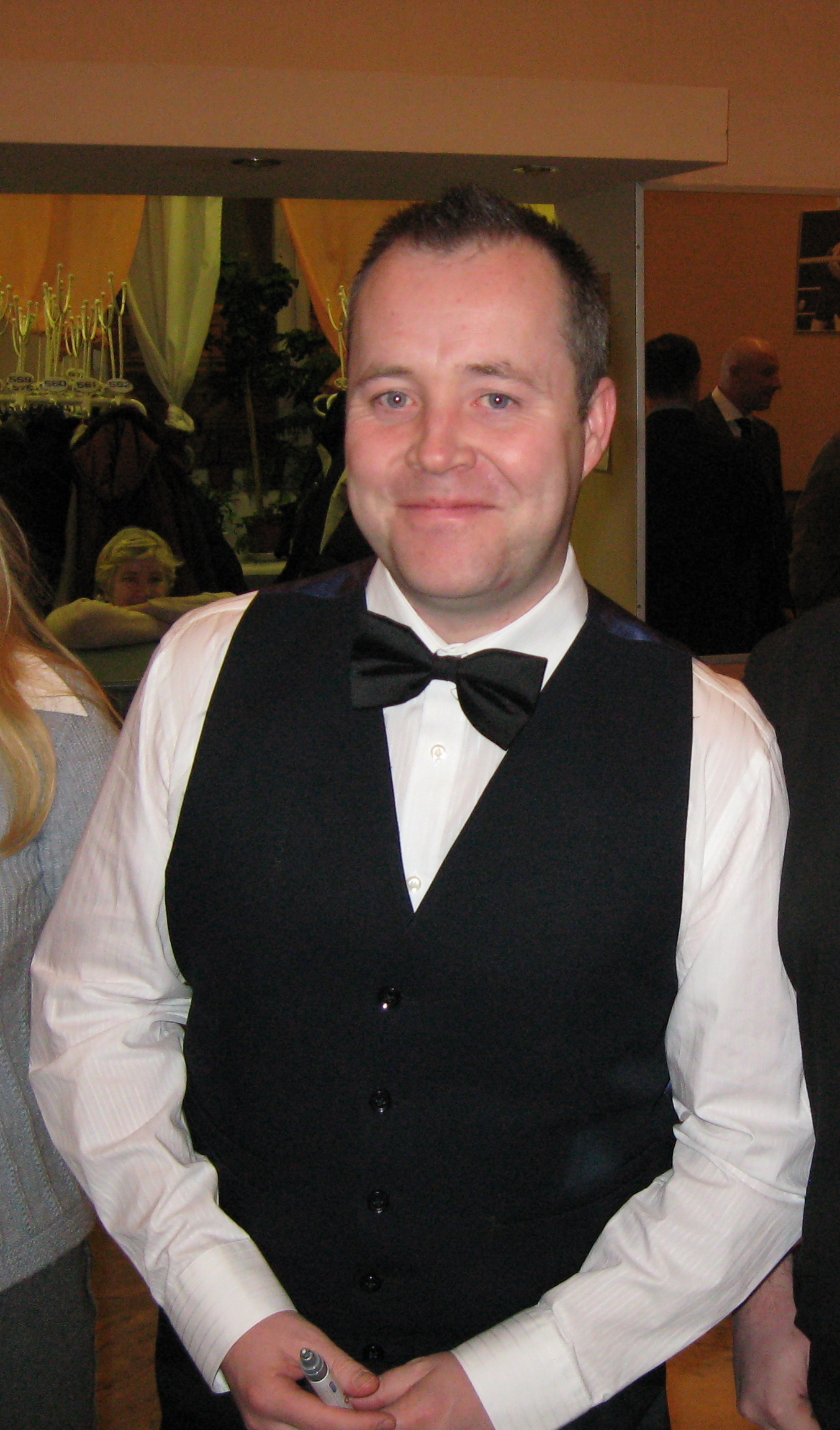
John Higgins (pictured in 2008) defeated Ronnie O'Sullivan in the final to win the Scottish Masters for the first time

The second semi-final was played by Higgins and Williams. A 44 clearance gave Williams the first frame. He had no further success in the match after he missed a pink ball from a long distance that would have tied the match at 2–2. Higgins made breaks of 74 and 71 to secure a 6–1 victory and the second berth in the final. Higgins commented on his chances of winning the tournament, "Ronnie has won his fair share in Scotland so it's about my turn but I'll have to raise my game a few notches to beat him. He's played well this week and he's beaten me the last few times. It won't be as one-sided here as it may have been in Motherwell, which is closer to where I live."

=== Final ===
The final between Higgins and O'Sullivan on 23 September was played as a two-session best-of-17 frames match. The first two frames were won by Higgins with one break at 111, before O'Sullivan won four in a row from breaks of 80, 117, 50 and 57 to convert a 2–0 deficit into a 4–2 lead. O'Sullivan missed a chance to go 5–2 ahead when he was unable to pot a difficult blue ball, and Higgins claimed frame seven by potting the black ball. He took frame eight to conclude the first session tied with O'Sullivan at 4–4. After a series of errors by both players, Higgins led 7–5. O'Sullivan had reduced his deficit to one with a break of 73. O'Sullivan failed to pot a single ball thereafter, as Higgins produced a clearance of 114 that ended at the pink ball. Higgins had a 60–0 advantage in frame 15 that he kept to win the match 9–6 and the tournament after O'Sullivan was unable to pot a red ball into the top-left corner pocket.

It was the first time that Higgins had won the Scottish Masters; he had lost in the final of the 1998 and 1999 tournaments. It was his second win of the season after the 2001 Champions Cup, and the 22nd tournament victory of his career. The win ended Higgins' streak of five successive losses to O'Sullivan extending back to the 2000 Irish Masters. It was the first time since the 2000 Grand Prix 11 months earlier that O'Sullivan had been defeated in a tournament final. Higgins commented on his win, "It's been a long wait but well worthwhile. To have my friends and family here to see me win makes it really special. I was really choked at the end". He added, "Winning here in Scotland has taken a lot of pressure off me and I couldn't be happier professionally and personally." O'Sullivan said he was disappointed with his performance against Higgins' consistency. He added that he felt he played better than he had in the Champions Cup, and was happy to reach the final of the Scottish Masters.

== Main draw ==
Numbers given to the left of players' names show the seedings for the top eight players in the tournament. Players in bold indicate match winners.

Round 1 Best of 9 frames
5	**Stephen Hendry** (SCO)	**5**
Jimmy White (ENG)	4
8	**Stephen Lee** (ENG)	**5**
Patrick Wallace (NIR)	0
6	**Matthew Stevens** (WAL)	**5**
Paul Hunter (ENG)	3
**Marco Fu** (HKG)	**5**
7	Peter Ebdon (ENG)	2

Quarter-finals; Best of 11 frames
3	**John Higgins** (SCO)	**6**
5	Stephen Hendry (SCO)	3
2	**Mark Williams** (WAL)	**6**
8	Stephen Lee (ENG)	3
1	**Ronnie O'Sullivan** (ENG)	**6**
6	Matthew Stevens (WAL)	3
**Marco Fu** (HKG)	**6**
4	Ken Doherty (IRL)	3

Semi-finals; Best of 11 frames
3	(Scotland) **John Higgins**	**6**
2	(Wales) Mark Williams	1
1	(England) **Ronnie O'Sullivan**	**6**
(Hong Kong) Marco Fu	3

Final; Best of 17 frames
3	(Scotland) **John Higgins**	**9**
1	(England) Ronnie O'Sullivan	6

== Final ==
The bold text denotes all of the winning frame scores and the winning participant. Breaks over 50 are indicated in brackets.

Final: Best of 17 frames. Thistle Hotel, Glasgow, Scotland, 23 September 2001.
Ronnie O'Sullivan (1); England	6–**9**	**John Higgins** (3); Scotland
Afternoon: 0–**137** (111), 26–**66**, **53**–42, **80**–18 (80), **117**–8 (117), **107**–20 (57, 50), 60–**66**, 0–**69** (69); Evening: 47–**62**, 1–**63** (59), **99**–23 (59), 14–**62**, **109**–0 (73), 0–**114** (114), 0–**89** (60)
**117**	Highest break	114
1	Century breaks	**2**
**6**	50+ breaks	5

== Qualifying Event ==
Qualifying for the tournament took place amongst 16 players at the Spencer's Snooker Centre from 26 to 31 August 2001. Players who entered the tournament included three-time Scottish Masters runner-up Alan McManus, former Grand Prix champion Dominic Dale and 1997 Scottish Masters victor Nigel Bond. Bookmakers installed McManus and Anthony Hamilton as the joint favourites to win the competition. Patrick Wallace defeated Joe Swail, Hamilton, Joe Perry and Stephen Maguire to qualify for the Scottish Masters. All matches were played to the best-of-nine frames and players in bold denote match winners.

Round 1 Best of 9 frames
1	Joe Swail (NIR)	3
16	**Patrick Wallace** (NIR)	**5**
8	**Anthony Hamilton** (ENG)	**5**
9	Dominic Dale (WAL)	4
5	Dave Harold (ENG)	4
12	**Joe Perry** (ENG)	**5**
4	Graeme Dott (SCO)	3
13	**Michael Judge** (IRL)	**5**
6	**Mark King** (ENG)	**5**
11	Tony Drago (MLT)	0
3	Fergal O'Brien (IRL)	1
14	**Stephen Maguire** (SCO)	**5**
7	**Drew Henry** (SCO)	**5**
10	Nigel Bond (ENG)	1
2	**Alan McManus** (SCO)	**5**
15	David Gray (ENG)	4

Quarter-finals; Best of 9 frames
(Northern Ireland) **Patrick Wallace**	**5**
(England) Anthony Hamilton	3
(England) **Joe Perry**	**5**
(Republic of Ireland) Michael Judge	1
(England) Mark King	3
(Scotland) **Stephen Maguire**	**5**
(Scotland) Drew Henry	1
(Scotland) **Alan McManus**	**5**

Semi-finals; Best of 9 frames
(Northern Ireland) **Patrick Wallace**	**5**
(England) Joe Perry	3
(Scotland) **Stephen Maguire**	**5**
(Scotland) Alan McManus	3

Final; Best of 9 frames
(Northern Ireland) **Patrick Wallace**	**5**
(Scotland) Stephen Maguire	0

== Century breaks ==
The main stage of the event saw a total of seven century breaks compiled by three different players. O'Sullivan made the highest break of 134 in the third frame of his semi-final game with Fu, which earned him £5,000 prize money.

- 134, 117, 108, 101 – Ronnie O'Sullivan
- 126 – Peter Ebdon
- 114, 111 – John Higgins
