= 2002 Scottish Masters =

Regal Scottish Masters
Tournament information
- Dates: 24–29 September 2002
- Venue: Thistle Hotel
- City: Glasgow
- Country: Scotland
- Organisation: WPBSA
- Format: Non-ranking event
- Total prize fund: £205,000
- Winner's share: £65,000
- Highest break: Stephen Lee (ENG) (139)

Final
- Champion: Ronnie O'Sullivan (ENG)
- Runner-up: John Higgins (SCO)
- Score: 9–4

The 2002 Scottish Masters (known as the 2002 Regal Scottish Masters for sponsorship reasons) was a professional non-ranking snooker tournament which took place at the Thistle Hotel in Glasgow, Scotland, from 24 to 29 September. It was the final edition of the tournament, as it later lost its sponsorship by the cigarette brand Regal. It was the first of two invitational World Professional Billiards and Snooker Association (WPBSA) competitions in the 2002–03 season. The host broadcaster was BBC Scotland.

Ronnie O'Sullivan, a former world champion, won the tournament, defeating the defending champion John Higgins 9–4 in the final. It was the third time that O'Sullivan had won the Scottish Masters in his career, and he was awarded £65,000 from a prize fund pool of £205,000. In the semi-finals O'Sullivan defeated world number six Stephen Hendry 6–3 and Higgins beat Stephen Lee 6–4; Lee made the tournament's highest break of 139 in his loss.

== Overview ==
The Scottish Masters was an invitational professional snooker tournament first contested in 1981. The 2002 competition was the first of two World Professional Billiards and Snooker Association (WPBSA) invitational events of the 2002–03 season, the other being the 2003 Masters. It was held at the Thistle Hotel in Glasgow, Scotland, from 24 to 29 September and featured a 12-player main draw. Sponsored by the cigarette brand Regal, it had a prize fund of £205,000; the host broadcaster was BBC Scotland. The 2002 competition was the last due to the loss of tobacco sponsorship.

The world top eight players were invited to the main draw and were seeded according to their final positions in the world rankings. The tournament's defending champion John Higgins was the first seed. Four competitors were given wild cards to enter the tournament: they were the 2002 Masters and Welsh Open champion Paul Hunter, Mark King, Jimmy White, and the champion of the 16-player Scottish Masters qualifying tournament and world number 22 Drew Henry. The maximum number of frames in a match increased from nine in the first round to eleven in the quarter and semi-finals; the final was played to the best-of-17 frames.

Before the tournament, Higgins stated that his four-month break from competing would assist his ardour and interest in the game: "I've moved house twice, got married and become a dad for the first time, so it's been hectic. But now things are almost back to normal. Winning the Masters was a monkey off my back because I'd lost four or five finals in Scotland. So I can't wait to get started and hopefully kick off the season with a win."

== Tournament summary ==
=== Round 1 ===
The first round was played from 24 to 25 September and entailed best-of-nine-frame matches. Stephen Lee, the 2002 Snooker Writers' Association Player of the Year and provisional world number one, made a break of 76, a 72 clearance and runs of 41, 40, 36 and 30 in defeating Scotland's Drew Henry 5–1. Henry won the fourth frame 60–37 but losing a 58–0 lead in the fifth due to a kick on a red ball. Lee said he was pleased with the result after heavy practise over the interval. World number ten and the tournament's oldest player White won 5–4 over former world champion Ken Doherty. Trailing 2–1, Doherty compiled a century break of 112 to tie the match in frame four. He took the lead with breaks of 44 and 39 for scores of 3–2 and 4–3. White compiled breaks of 36 and 38 to force a final frame, which he won 67–40.

World number nine Hunter won 5–3 against the 1999 Scottish Masters champion Matthew Stevens. Hunter led 3–0 with breaks of 101, 72 and 64 before Stevens made reply breaks of 66 and 77. The match was tied after six frames before Hunter won the next two to secure a quarter-final berth. Hunter stated that he shook "like a leaf" for much of the game and Stevens said "things didn't go too well for me in this game." Breaks of 84, 82, 58, 47 and 39 allowed the world number six Stephen Hendry to whitewash King 5–0 in 90 minutes. Afterwards he said: "The first three or four frames were pretty good. It was a bit scrappy towards the end but getting the result was the main thing." He said he would not think of his next match against world champion Peter Ebdon as seeking revenge for his loss to him in the final of the 2002 world championship.

=== Quarter-finals ===
The four quarter-finals took place from 26 to 27 September as the best-of-11 frames. Ronnie O'Sullivan, a former world champion, defeated Hunter 6–3 to qualify for the semi-finals. He made two breaks of 58 and 59 to lead 3–0 before Hunter compiled reply breaks of 68 and 51 to make it 3–2. Hunter was later 4–3 behind until he failed to pot several red balls and O'Sullivan won the match. After the match, O'Sullivan criticised Hendry and his manager Ian Doyle as wanting to take control of snooker's commercial rights from the WPBSA to benefit themselves, something Doyle denied. John Higgins overcame a challenge from White to win 6–4. He started with a 2–0 lead only to trail 4–2 after White made breaks of 81, 74 and 46. Higgins compiled a 133 clearance in the seventh frame and finished the match with breaks of 55 and 95. He called it "a topsy-turvy game" and said he had thought he would be unchallenged after White's poor early performance.

Lee took 103 minutes to whitewash Mark Williams 6–0 with breaks of 43, 46, 70, 122, 51 and 73; he accumulated more aggregate points than his opponent, 519–99. It was Williams' first career whitewash since he lost 5–0 to Doherty at the 1999 tournament. Lee had won against Williams for the first time in his three years playing in the tournament. Williams said he had "made it too easy" for Lee because he had left balls near the pockets. Hendry avenged his loss to Ebdon by defeating his opponent 6–4 in the last quarter-final match. He produced a 136 total clearance to hold a 4–2 lead and later compiled a break of 87 to win the match. After the game, Hendry said that neither he nor Ebdon were at their best form because there were a large number of errors during the match.

=== Semi-finals ===
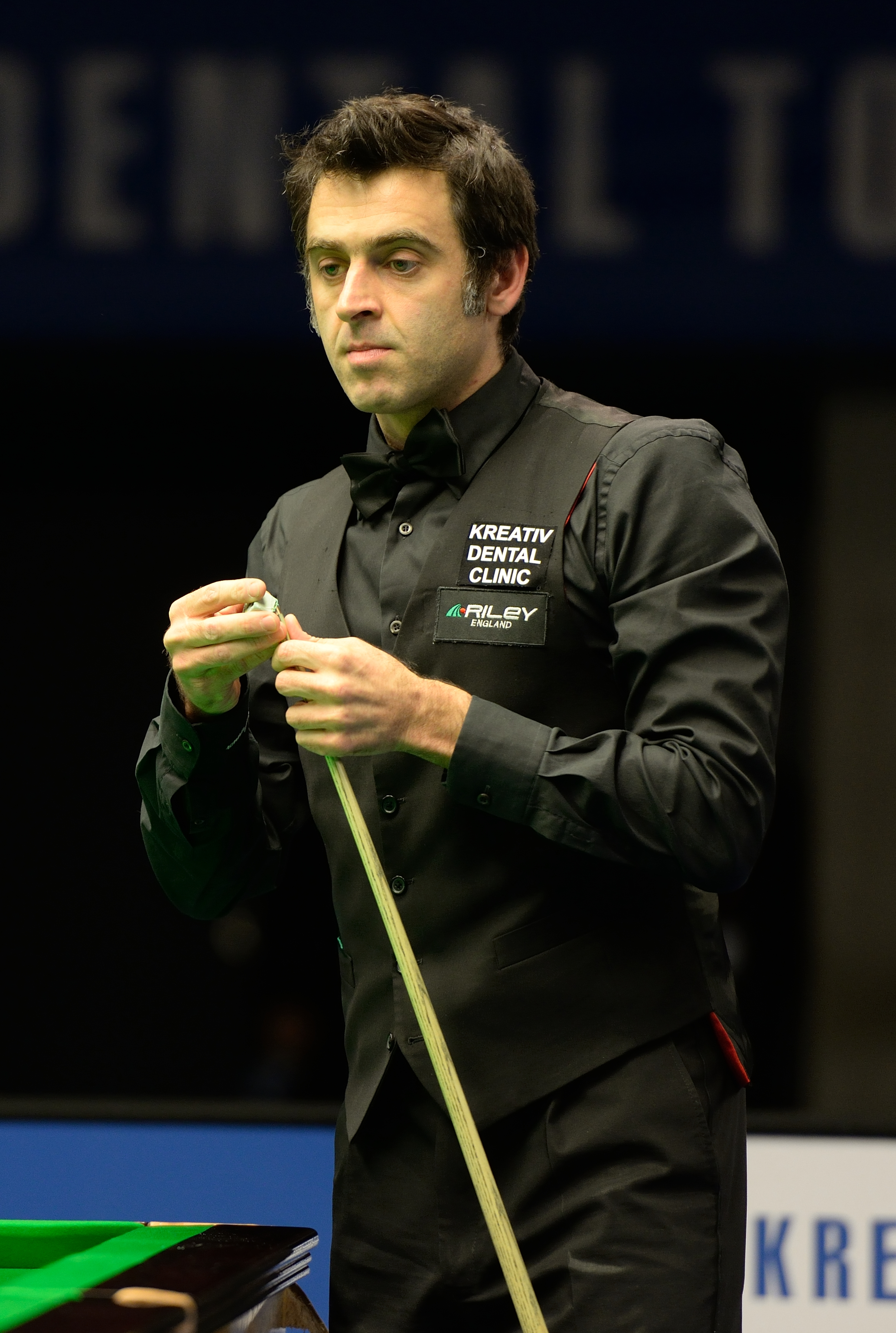
Ronnie O'Sullivan (pictured in 2015) won the Scottish Masters for the third time.

Both semi-finals were held to the best-of-11 frames on 28 September. Higgins defeated Lee 6–4 with breaks of 89, 77, 72, 60 and 50 to earn the first berth in the final. Ahead 5–3, Higgins lost the ninth frame to Lee before he won the match after Lee potted a red and the pink ball simultaneously with a break of 51. Lee had compiled the tournament's highest break of 139 to overtake Hendry's 136 from the previous day.

The other semi-final saw Hendry and O'Sullivan play each other. O'Sullivan took a 2–0 lead from breaks of 75 and 73 within ¼ hour. After Hendry missed a red while on a break of 65, O'Sullivan made a 69 clearance to further increase his lead by one frame. Hendry claimed three successive frames to tie the match before O'Sullivan made breaks of 76, 136 and 62 to win 6–3 and the second berth in the final.

=== Final ===
The final between Higgins and O'Sullivan on 29 September was contested over two sessions as a best-of-17 frames match. O'Sullivan led 5–1 by compiling breaks of 51, 79, 52, 65 and 43 with the solitary reply from Higgins being a 100 break in frame four. Higgins reduced his deficit to 5–4 with breaks of 48, 49 and 59. O'Sullivan then produced breaks of 43, 112, 52 and 91 to claim four frames in a row within 43 minutes and win the tournament with a 9–4 victory. It was O'Sullivan's third Scottish Masters tournament win after his victories in 1998 and 2000, and equalled a record Hendry had held. He had won his eighth competition in Scotland, his 26th from 34 finals; he earned £65,000 in prize money. Higgins was runner-up for the 15th time in his career from 39 finals, and earned £32,000. Lee won £5,000 for producing the tournament's highest break of 139 in the semi-finals.

O'Sullivan said he had been focused on improving his form by using the golfer Tiger Woods as an example. "He's shown the way to be professional and how hard work pays off." He had gone into the tournament feeling confident because he had accumulated high breaks against his fellow players in practice. He stated he wanted to win approximately 50 to 60 championships to keep him motivated before his retirement and knew that reaching the level of Steve Davis and Hendry would be difficult. Higgins commented that O'Sullivan deserved to win the tournament, and admitted to have not taken advantage of his opportunities: "Even when I got back to 5–4 I couldn't put any pressure on him. I did well in these invitation events last season and not in the ranking tournaments so it would be nice if I can change that around."

== Main draw ==
Numbers given to the left of players' names show the seedings for the top eight players in the tournament. Players in bold denote match winners.

Round 1 Best of 9 frames
N/A	**Paul Hunter** (ENG)	**5**
8	Matthew Stevens (WAL)	3
6	**Stephen Hendry** (SCO)	**5**
N/A	Mark King (ENG)	0
N/A	**Jimmy White** (ENG)	**5**
5	Ken Doherty (IRL)	4
7	**Stephen Lee** (ENG)	**5**
N/A	Drew Henry (SCO)	1

Quarter-finals; Best of 11 frames
2	**Ronnie O'Sullivan** (ENG)	**6**
N/A	Paul Hunter (ENG)	3
5	**Stephen Hendry** (SCO)	**6**
3	Peter Ebdon (ENG)	4
1	**John Higgins** (SCO)	**6**
N/A	Jimmy White (ENG)	4
7	**Stephen Lee** (ENG)	**6**
3	Mark Williams (WAL)	0

Semi-finals; Best of 11 frames
2	(England) **Ronnie O'Sullivan**	**6**
5	(Scotland) Stephen Hendry	3
1	(Scotland) **John Higgins**	**6**
7	(England) Stephen Lee	4

Final; Best of 17 frames
2	(England) **Ronnie O'Sullivan**	**9**
1	(Scotland) John Higgins	4

== Qualifying Event ==
Qualifying for the tournament took place amongst 16 players at Spencer's Leisure, Stirling from 27 August to 1 September. The 16-player tournament included the likes of Graeme Dott, the 2001 British Open runner-up, and the 1995 world championship runner-up Nigel Bond. Drew Henry won the tournament and earned the final wild card spot for the Scottish Masters by defeating Dominic Dale, Robin Hull, Joe Swail and Ali Carter over four rounds. All matches were played to the best-of-nine frames and players in bold indicate match winners.

Round 1 Best of 9 frames
Graeme Dott (SCO)	1
**Robin Hull** (FIN)	**5**
Dominic Dale (WAL)	2
**Drew Henry** (SCO)	**5**
**Joe Swail** (NIR)	**5**
Anthony Davies (WAL)	2
**Alan McManus** (SCO)	**5**
Chris Small (SCO)	0
Tony Drago (MLT)	1
**Nigel Bond** (ENG)	**5**
Anthony Hamilton (ENG)	4
**Michael Judge** (IRL)	**5**
**David Gray** (ENG)	**5**
Fergal O'Brien (IRL)	4
Joe Perry (ENG)	3
**Ali Carter** (ENG)	**5**

Quarter-finals; Best of 9 frames
(Finland) Robin Hull	3
(Scotland) **Drew Henry**	**5**
(Northern Ireland) **Joe Swail**	**5**
(Scotland) Alan McManus	4
(England) Nigel Bond	2
(Republic of Ireland) **Michael Judge**	**5**
(England) David Gray	4
(England) **Ali Carter**	**5**

Semi-finals; Best of 9 frames
(Scotland) **Drew Henry**	**5**
(Northern Ireland) Joe Swail	4
(Republic of Ireland) Michael Judge	0
(England) **Ali Carter**	**5**

Final; Best of 9 frames
(Scotland) **Drew Henry**	**5**
(England) Ali Carter	3

== Century breaks ==
=== Qualifying stage centuries ===
Two century breaks were made by two different players during the qualifying tournament.

- 141 – Ali Carter
- 109 – Nigel Bond

=== Televised stage centuries ===
The main stage of the 2002 Scottish Masters yielded eight century breaks by six different players. The highest was a 139 by Stephen Lee in his semi-final match against John Higgins, which earned him £5,000.

- 139, 122 – Stephen Lee
- 136, 112 – Ronnie O'Sullivan
- 136 – Stephen Hendry
- 133, 100 – John Higgins
- 112 – Ken Doherty
- 101 – Paul Hunter
