= 1991 Scottish Masters =

Scottish Masters
Tournament information
- Dates: 11–15 September 1991
- Venue: Motherwell Civic Centre
- City: Motherwell
- Country: Scotland
- Organisation: WPBSA
- Format: Non-ranking event
- Total prize fund: £105,000
- Winner's share: £37,000
- Highest break: Mike Hallett (ENG) (123)

Final
- Champion: (England) Mike Hallett
- Runner-up: (England) Steve Davis
- Score: 10–6

The 1991 Regal Scottish Masters was a professional non-ranking snooker tournament that took place between 11 and 15 September 1991 at the Motherwell Civic Centre in Motherwell, Scotland.

Mike Hallett won the tournament by defeating Steve Davis 10–6 in the final.

== Main draw ==
Round 1 Best of 11 Frames
(England) Mike Hallett | 6
(Northern Ireland) Dennis Taylor | 5
(England) Steve James | 6
(Scotland) Alan McManus | 4

Quarter-finals; Best of 11 Frames
(Scotland) Stephen Hendry | 5
(England) Mike Hallett | 6
(England) Gary Wilkinson | 6
(England) Jimmy White | 5
(England) Steve James | 6
(England) John Parrott | 4
(England) Steve Davis | 6
(England) Neal Foulds | 3

Semi-finals; Best of 11 Frames
(England) Mike Hallett | 6
(England) Gary Wilkinson | 5
(England) Steve James | 1
(England) Steve Davis | 6

Final; Best of 19 Frames
(England) Mike Hallett | 10
(England) Steve Davis | 6
