= 1995 Scottish Masters =

Scottish Masters
Tournament information
- Dates: 19–24 September 1995
- Venue: Motherwell Civic Centre
- City: Motherwell
- Country: Scotland
- Organisation: WPBSA
- Format: Non-ranking event
- Total prize fund: £165,000
- Winner's share: £54,000
- Highest break: (Scotland) Stephen Hendry (136)

Final
- Champion: (Scotland) Stephen Hendry
- Runner-up: (England) Peter Ebdon
- Score: 9–5

The 1995 Regal Scottish Masters was a professional non-ranking snooker tournament that took place between 19 and 24 September 1995 at the Motherwell Civic Centre in Motherwell, Scotland.

Ken Doherty was the defending champion, but he lost in the quarter-finals to Peter Ebdon.

Stephen Hendry defeated Ebdon in the final, to win his third Scottish Masters title.

== Prize Fund ==
The breakdown of prize money for this year is shown below:

- Winner: £54,000
- Runner-up: £27,000
- Semi-final: £14,000
- Quarter-final: £8,000
- Round 1: £4,500
- High break: £5,000
- Total: £165,000

== Main draw ==
Round 1 Best of 9 Frames
(England) Nigel Bond	5
(England) Jimmy White	2
(Wales) Darren Morgan	5
(England) John Parrott	0
(England) Peter Ebdon	5
(Scotland) Alan Burnett	0
(Scotland) John Higgins	5
(Scotland) Alan McManus	1

Quarter-finals; Best of 11 Frames
(Scotland) Stephen Hendry	6
(England) Nigel Bond	4
(Wales) Darren Morgan	6
(England) Steve Davis	3
(England) Peter Ebdon	6
(Republic of Ireland) Ken Doherty	4
(England) Ronnie O'Sullivan	6
(Scotland) John Higgins	5

Semi-finals; Best of 11 Frames
(Scotland) Stephen Hendry	6
(Wales) Darren Morgan	2
(England) Peter Ebdon	6
(England) Ronnie O'Sullivan	1

Final; Best of 17 Frames
(Scotland) Stephen Hendry	9
(England) Peter Ebdon	5

== Qualifying Event ==
Qualifying for the tournament was held on 17 September 1995 at the Masters Club in Glasgow after the late withdrawal of James Wattana from the main event for personal reasons. Alan Burnett won the four-man playoff and earned the final spot for the event by defeating the 1992 Scottish Masters champion Neal Foulds and the 1995 World Championship semi-finalist Andy Hicks. All matches were played to the best-of-nine frames and players in bold indicate match winners.

Semi-final; Best of 9 frames
(Scotland) **Alan Burnett**	**5**
(England) Neal Foulds	2
(England) **Andy Hicks**	**5**
(Scotland) Billy Snaddon	2

Final; Best of 9 frames
(Scotland) **Alan Burnett**	**5**
(England) Andy Hicks	2

== Century breaks ==
- 136, 129, 116, 104, 100 – Stephen Hendry
- 121, 114, 112, 102 – Peter Ebdon
- 106 – Ken Doherty
