= 2000 Scottish Masters =

Regal Scottish Masters
Tournament information
- Dates: 24–29 October 2000
- Venue: Motherwell Civic Centre
- City: Motherwell
- Country: Scotland
- Organisation: WPBSA
- Format: Non-Ranking event
- Total prize fund: £195,000
- Winner's share: £62,000
- Highest break: (Hong Kong) Marco Fu (147)

Final
- Champion: (England) Ronnie O'Sullivan
- Runner-up: (Scotland) Stephen Hendry
- Score: 9–6

The 2000 Regal Scottish Masters was a professional non-ranking snooker tournament which took place from 24 to 29 October. The tournament was played at the Motherwell Civic Centre, Scotland, and featured twelve professional players.

Ronnie O'Sullivan won the tournament for the second time, defeating Stephen Hendry 9–6 in the final. Marco Fu recorded his first maximum break in his first round match with Ken Doherty. This was the first ever 147 streamed live on the Internet.

== Prize fund ==
The breakdown of prize money for the tournament was as follows:

- Winner: £62,000
- Runner-up: £30,000
- Semi-finalists: £15,500
- Quarter-finalists: £9,000
- First round: £5,000
- Highest break: £5,000
- Maximum break: a car
- Total: £195,000

== Main draw ==
Round 1 Best of 9 frames
(England) Ronnie O'Sullivan	5
(England) Jimmy White	3
(England) Stephen Lee	5
(England) Steve Davis	1
(Scotland) Alan McManus	5
(Republic of Ireland) Fergal O'Brien	3
(Republic of Ireland) Ken Doherty	5
(Hong Kong) Marco Fu	1

Quarter-finals; Best of 11 frames
(England) Ronnie O'Sullivan	6
(Scotland) John Higgins	4
(Wales) Mark Williams	6
(England) Stephen Lee	4
(Scotland) Stephen Hendry	6
(Scotland) Alan McManus	5
(Republic of Ireland) Ken Doherty	6
(Wales) Matthew Stevens	1

Semi-finals; Best of 11 frames
(England) Ronnie O'Sullivan	6
(Wales) Mark Williams	5
(Scotland) Stephen Hendry	6
(Republic of Ireland) Ken Doherty	1

Final; Best of 17 frames
(England) Ronnie O'Sullivan	9
(Scotland) Stephen Hendry	6

== Qualifying Event ==
Qualifying for the tournament took place amongst 12 players at the Spencer's Snooker Centre in Stirling from 18 to 22 September 2000. Jimmy White dropped only four frames throughout the event as he won the tournament and earned the final wild card spot for the Scottish Masters by defeating Stephen Maguire, Drew Henry and Joe Swail over three rounds. All matches were played to the best-of-nine frames and players in bold indicate match winners.

Round 1 Best of 9 frames
(Scotland) Billy Snaddon	2
(Scotland) **Drew Henry**	**5**
(Scotland) Graeme Dott	1
(Scotland) **Stephen Maguire**	**5**
(Wales) Dominic Dale	4
(England) **Stuart Bingham**	**5**
(Scotland) **Chris Small**	**5**
(England) David Gray	2

Quarter-finals; Best of 9 frames
(England) Anthony Hamilton	2
(Scotland) **Drew Henry**	**5**
(England) **Jimmy White**	**5**
(Scotland) Stephen Maguire	1
(Northern Ireland) **Joe Swail**	**5**
(England) Stuart Bingham	3
(England) Dave Harold	0
(Scotland) **Chris Small**	**5**

Semi-finals; Best of 9 frames
(Scotland) Drew Henry	1
(England) **Jimmy White**	**5**
(Northern Ireland) **Joe Swail**	**5**
(Scotland) Chris Small	4

Final; Best of 9 frames
(England) **Jimmy White**	**5**
(Northern Ireland) Joe Swail	2
