= 1999 Scottish Masters =

Scottish Masters
Tournament information
- Dates: 28 September – 4 October 1999
- Venue: Motherwell Civic Centre
- City: Motherwell
- Country: Scotland
- Organisation: WPBSA
- Format: Non-ranking event
- Total prize fund: £181,900
- Winner's share: £61,000
- Highest break: (England) Jimmy White (138)

Final
- Champion: (Wales) Matthew Stevens
- Runner-up: (Scotland) John Higgins
- Score: 9–7

The 1999 Regal Scottish Masters was a professional non-ranking snooker tournament that took place between 28 September and 3 October 1999 at the Motherwell Civic Centre in Motherwell, Scotland.

Matthew Stevens won the tournament, defeating John Higgins 9–7 in the final.

== Prize Fund ==
The breakdown of prize money for this year is shown below:

- Winner: £61,000
- Runner-up: £29,700
- Semi-final: £15,350
- Quarter-final: £8,650
- Round 1: £4,850
- Highest break: £5,000
- Total: 181,900

== Main draw ==
Round 1 Best of 9 Frames
(Wales) Matthew Stevens	5
(Scotland) Alan McManus	2
(England) Stephen Lee	5
(Republic of Ireland) Fergal O'Brien	4
(England) John Parrott	5
(England) Steve Davis	2
(Republic of Ireland) Ken Doherty	5
(England) Jimmy White	4

Quarter-finals; Best of 11 Frames
(England) Ronnie O'Sullivan	4
(Wales) Matthew Stevens	6
(Wales) Mark Williams	6
(England) Stephen Lee	3
(Scotland) Stephen Hendry	6
(England) John Parrott	2
(Scotland) John Higgins	6
(Republic of Ireland) Ken Doherty	1

Semi-finals; Best of 11 Frames
(Wales) Matthew Stevens	6
(Wales) Mark Williams	2
(Scotland) Stephen Hendry	1
(Scotland) John Higgins	6

Final; Best of 17 Frames
(Wales) Matthew Stevens	9
(Scotland) John Higgins	7

== Qualifying Event ==
Qualifying for the tournament took place at the Spencer's Snooker Centre in Stirling from 23 to 27 August 1999. Matthew Stevens earned the final spot for the event, beating Marco Fu 5–1 in the final.

Round 1 Best of 9 frames
(Scotland) Chris Small	5
(England) Peter Ebdon	2
(Hong Kong) Marco Fu	5
(England) Paul Hunter	2

Semi-finals; Best of 9 frames
(Wales) Matthew Stevens	5
(Scotland) Chris Small	4
(Hong Kong) Marco Fu	5
(England) Anthony Hamilton	2

Final; Best of 9 frames
(Wales) Matthew Stevens	5
(Hong Kong) Marco Fu	1

== Century breaks ==
- 138 – Jimmy White
- 134 – Stephen Hendry
- 129 – Anthony Hamilton
- 128, 126, 111 – John Higgins
- 106, 100 – Chris Small
- 103, 103, 103 – Matthew Stevens
- 102 – Paul Hunter
