= 1998 Scottish Masters =

Scottish Masters
Tournament information
- Dates: 29 September – 4 October 1998
- Venue: Motherwell Civic Centre
- City: Motherwell
- Country: Scotland
- Organisation: WPBSA
- Format: Non-ranking event
- Total prize fund: £175,400
- Winner's share: £61,000
- Highest break: (England) Jimmy White (132)

Final
- Champion: (England) Ronnie O'Sullivan
- Runner-up: (Scotland) John Higgins
- Score: 9–7

The 1998 Regal Scottish Masters was a professional non-ranking snooker tournament that took place between 29 September and 4 October 1998 at the Motherwell Civic Centre in Motherwell, Scotland.

== Prize Fund ==
The breakdown of prize money for this year is shown below:

- Winner: £61,000
- Runner-up: £29,700
- Semi-final: £15,350
- Quarter-final: £8,650
- Round 1: £4,850
- Total: £175,400

== Main draw ==
Round 1 Best of 9 Frames
(England) Jimmy White | 5
(Republic of Ireland) Ken Doherty | 4
(Wales) Mark Williams | 5
(England) Steve Davis | 4
(England) Peter Ebdon | 5
(England) Paul Hunter | 1
(England) John Parrott | 5
(Scotland) Alan McManus | 4

Quarter-finals; Best of 11 Frames
(England) Nigel Bond | 6
(England) Jimmy White | 4
(England) Ronnie O'Sullivan | 6
(Wales) Mark Williams | 5
(Scotland) Stephen Hendry | 6
(England) Peter Ebdon | 5
(Scotland) John Higgins | 6
(England) John Parrott | 1

Semi-finals; Best of 11 Frames
(England) Nigel Bond | 5
(England) Ronnie O'Sullivan | 6
(Scotland) Stephen Hendry | 5
(Scotland) John Higgins | 6

Final; Best of 17 Frames
(England) Ronnie O'Sullivan | 9
(Scotland) John Higgins | 7

== Preliminary qualifying ==
The preliminary qualifying rounds for the tournament were for four highest-ranked Scottish players who were not invited to the main event and took place on 9 September 1998 at the Spencer's Snooker Centre in Stirling. Jamie Burnett won the four-man playoff and earned the final spot for the main qualifying event. All matches were played to the best-of-nine frames and players in bold indicate match winners.

Round 1 Best of 9 frames
(Scotland) Chris Small | 0
(Scotland) **Billy Snaddon** | **5**
(Scotland) Graeme Dott | 4
(Scotland) **Jamie Burnett** | **5**

Round 2 Best of 9 frames
(Scotland) Billy Snaddon | 2
(Scotland) **Jamie Burnett** | **5**

== Qualifying Event ==
Qualifying for the tournament took place at the Spencer's Snooker Centre in Stirling from 10 to 12 September 1998. Paul Hunter defeated Matthew Stevens, Stephen Lee and Jamie Burnett to secure a place at the main draw. All matches were played to the best-of-nine frames and players in bold indicate match winners.

Round 1 Best of 9 frames
(England) **Paul Hunter** | **5**
(Wales) Matthew Stevens | 3
(Scotland) **Jamie Burnett** | **5**
(England) Anthony Hamilton | 4

Semi-finals; Best of 9 frames
(England) **Paul Hunter** | **5**
(England) Stephen Lee | 4
(Malta) Tony Drago | 2
(Scotland) **Jamie Burnett** | **5**

Final; Best of 9 frames
(England) **Paul Hunter** | **5**
(Scotland) Jamie Burnett | 1

== Century breaks ==
- 132 – Jimmy White
- 129, 122 – Stephen Hendry
- 113, 107 – John Higgins
- 113 – Mark Williams
- 100 – Paul Hunter
