= 1997 Scottish Masters =

Scottish Masters
Tournament information
- Dates: 30 September – 5 October 1997
- Venue: Motherwell Civic Centre
- City: Motherwell
- Country: Scotland
- Organisation: WPBSA
- Format: Non-ranking event
- Total prize fund: £180,000
- Winner's share: £60,000
- Highest break: (Scotland) Alan McManus (140)

Final
- Champion: (England) Nigel Bond
- Runner-up: (Scotland) Alan McManus
- Score: 9–8

The 1997 Regal Scottish Masters was a professional non-ranking snooker tournament that took place between 30 September and 5 October 1997 at the Motherwell Civic Centre in Motherwell, Scotland.

Nigel Bond recovered from 6–8 down to defeat local favorite Alan McManus 9–8.

== Main draw ==
Round 1 Best of 9 Frames
(Scotland) Alan McManus	5
(Wales) Mark Williams	4
(England) Ronnie O'Sullivan	5
(Canada) Alain Robidoux	1
(England) John Parrott	5
(England) Jimmy White	2
(England) Nigel Bond	5
(England) Steve Davis	4

Quarter-finals; Best of 11 Frames
(Scotland) Alan McManus	6
(England) Peter Ebdon	3
(Scotland) John Higgins	6
(England) Ronnie O'Sullivan	2
(England) John Parrott	6
(Scotland) Stephen Hendry	5
(England) Nigel Bond	6
(Republic of Ireland) Ken Doherty	5

Semi-finals; Best of 11 Frames
(Scotland) Alan McManus	6
(Scotland) John Higgins	5
(England) John Parrott	3
(England) Nigel Bond	6

Final; Best of 17 Frames
(Scotland) Alan McManus	8
(England) Nigel Bond	9

== Final ==
Final: Best of 17 frames. Motherwell Civic Centre, Motherwell, Scotland, 5 October 1997.
Alan McManus; Scotland	8–9	Nigel Bond; England
64–26 (63), 102–17 (66), 4–99 (51), 74–5 (62), 53–84, 0–77 (55), 28–78 (66), 29–58, 0–128 (128), 93–24 (61); 69–44, 112–12 (63), 74–2 (74), 90–12 (85), 61(56)–67(67), 14–72, 30–67
85	Highest break	126
0	Century breaks	1
8	50+ breaks	5

== Qualifying Event ==
Qualifying for the tournament took place amongst 6 players at the Spencer's Snooker Centre in Stirling from 9 to 11 September 1997. In the first round, 1985 World Champion Dennis Taylor beat Anthony Hamilton 5–4, while former Irish Masters champion Darren Morgan whitewashed Billy Snaddon. In the semi-finals, former Masters champion Alan McManus defeated Morgan 5–1, while world number 11 Tony Drago won 5–3 over Taylor. In the final McManus defeated Drago 5–2, making five half-century breaks in the match, to earn a place at the main draw. All matches were played to the best-of-nine frames and players in bold indicate match winners.

Round 1 Best of 9 frames
(Northern Ireland) **Dennis Taylor**	**5**
(England) Anthony Hamilton	4
(Wales) **Darren Morgan**	**5**
(Scotland) Billy Snaddon	0

Semi-finals; Best of 9 frames
(Malta) **Tony Drago**	**5**
(Northern Ireland) Dennis Taylor	3
(Scotland) **Alan McManus**	**5**
(Wales) Darren Morgan	1

Final; Best of 9 frames
(Malta) Tony Drago	2
(Scotland) **Alan McManus**	**5**

== Century breaks ==
- 140, 119 – Alan McManus
- 128 – Nigel Bond
- 120, 105 – Ronnie O'Sullivan
- 119 – John Parrott
- 114 – John Higgins
- 111 – Anthony Hamilton
