= Scottish Masters =

Snooker tournament

Tournament information
- Venue: various
- Country: Scotland
- Established: 1981
- Organisation(s): World Professional Billiards and Snooker Association
- Format: Non-ranking event
- Final year: 2002
- Final champion: (England) Ronnie O'Sullivan

The Scottish Masters, often known by its sponsored names, the Lang's Scottish Masters or the Regal Scottish Masters, was a non-ranking professional snooker tournament held every year from 1981 until 2002, with the exception of 1988.

The tournament was invitational and held in various locations in Scotland, including the Hospitality Inn and the Thistle Hotel (both in Glasgow) and the Motherwell Civic Centre. Following the ban on tobacco advertising, the tournament was unable to find a new sponsor and it was abandoned. It was won three times apiece by Steve Davis, Stephen Hendry and Ronnie O'Sullivan.

A qualifying event was held for the first time in 1995 to select a replacement player for James Wattana who withdrew before the tournament. The event became a fixture from 1997 onwards, with Matthew Stevens becoming the only qualifier to win the main tournament in 1999.

== Winners ==
Year	Winner	Runner-up	Final score	Season
1981	(England) Jimmy White	(Canada) Cliff Thorburn	9–4	1981/82
1982	(England) Steve Davis	(Northern Ireland) Alex Higgins	9–4	1982/83
1983	(England) Steve Davis	(England) Tony Knowles	9–6	1983/84
1984	(England) Steve Davis	(England) Jimmy White	9–4	1984/85
1985	(Canada) Cliff Thorburn	(England) Willie Thorne	9–7	1985/86
1986	(Canada) Cliff Thorburn	(Northern Ireland) Alex Higgins	9–8	1986/87
1987	(England) Joe Johnson	(Wales) Terry Griffiths	9–7	1987/88
1989	(Scotland) Stephen Hendry	(Wales) Terry Griffiths	10–1	1989/90
1990	(Scotland) Stephen Hendry	(Wales) Terry Griffiths	10–6	1990/91
1991	(England) Mike Hallett	(England) Steve Davis	10–6	1991/92
1992	(England) Neal Foulds	(England) Gary Wilkinson	10–8	1992/93
1993	(Republic of Ireland) Ken Doherty	(Scotland) Alan McManus	10–9	1993/94
1994	(Republic of Ireland) Ken Doherty	(Scotland) Stephen Hendry	9–7	1994/95
1995	(Scotland) Stephen Hendry	(England) Peter Ebdon	9–5	1995/96
1996	(England) Peter Ebdon	(Scotland) Alan McManus	9–6	1996/97
1997	(England) Nigel Bond	(Scotland) Alan McManus	9–8	1997/98
1998	(England) Ronnie O'Sullivan	(Scotland) John Higgins	9–7	1998/99
1999	(Wales) Matthew Stevens	(Scotland) John Higgins	9–7	1999/00
2000	(England) Ronnie O'Sullivan	(Scotland) Stephen Hendry	9–6	2000/01
2001	(Scotland) John Higgins	(England) Ronnie O'Sullivan	9–6	2001/02
2002	(England) Ronnie O'Sullivan	(Scotland) John Higgins	9–4	2002/03

== Qualifying event winners ==
Year	Winner	Runner-up	Final score	Season
1995	(Scotland) Alan Burnett	(England) Andy Hicks	5–2	1995/96
1997	(Scotland) Alan McManus	(Malta) Tony Drago	5–2	1997/98
1998	(England) Paul Hunter	(Scotland) Jamie Burnett	5–1	1998/99
1999	(Wales) Matthew Stevens	(Hong Kong) Marco Fu	5–1	1999/00
2000	(England) Jimmy White	(Northern Ireland) Joe Swail	5–2	2000/01
2001	(Northern Ireland) Patrick Wallace	(Scotland) Stephen Maguire	5–0	2001/02
2002	(Scotland) Drew Henry	(England) Ali Carter	5–3	2002/03
