= 1989 Scottish Masters =

Scottish Masters
Tournament information
- Dates: 13–17 September 1989
- Venue: Scottish Exhibition Centre
- City: Glasgow
- Country: Scotland
- Organisation: WPBSA
- Format: Non-ranking event
- Total prize fund: £86,000
- Winner's share: £32,500
- Highest break: John Parrott (ENG) (134)

Final
- Champion: (Scotland) Stephen Hendry
- Runner-up: (Wales) Terry Griffiths
- Score: 10–1

The 1989 Regal Scottish Masters was a professional non-ranking snooker tournament that took place between 13 and 17 September 1989 at the Scottish Exhibition Centre in Glasgow, Scotland.

Stephen Hendry won the tournament by defeating Terry Griffiths 10–1 in the final.

== Prize fund ==
The breakdown of prize money for this year is shown below:

- Winner: £32,500
- Runner-up: £16,000
- Semi-final: £8,000
- Quarter-final: £3,750
- Round 1: £1,500
- Highest break: £3,500
- Total: £86,000

== Main draw ==
Round 1 Best of 11 Frames
(Canada) Cliff Thorburn	6
(Scotland) Murdo MacLeod	2
(Scotland) John Rea	6
(Northern Ireland) Dennis Taylor	2

Quarter-finals; Best of 11 Frames
(Scotland) Stephen Hendry	6
(England) Mike Hallett	1
(England) John Parrott	6
(Canada) Cliff Thorburn	5
(Wales) Terry Griffiths	6
(England) Jimmy White	3
(England) Steve Davis	6
(Scotland) John Rea	2

Semi-finals; Best of 11 Frames
(Scotland) Stephen Hendry	6
(England) John Parrott	4
(Wales) Terry Griffiths	6
(England) Steve Davis	2

Final; Best of 19 Frames
(Scotland) Stephen Hendry	10
(Wales) Terry Griffiths	1
