= 1995 Belgian Masters =

Invitational snooker tournament

Tournament information
- City: Antwerp
- Country: Belgium
- Organisation: WPBSA
- Format: Non-ranking event
- Winner's share: £4,000
- Highest break: Yasin Merchant (IND)

Final
- Champion: Matthew Stevens (WAL)
- Runner-up: Patrick Delsemme (BEL)
- Score: 7–1

The 1995 Belgian Masters was a World Professional Billiards and Snooker Association Tour Event, an invitational non-ranking snooker tournament held in Antwerp, Belgium in December 1995. Matthew Stevens won the tournament defeating Patrick Delsemme 7–1 in the final. Delsemme had won the second frame of the final, to level at 1–1, but then lost the next six frames.

Yasin Merchant made the highest break of the tournament, 107, in the third frame of his match against Scott MacFarlane.

== Prize fund ==
The breakdown of prize money is shown below:

- Winner: £4,000
- Runner-up: £2,300
- Semi-finalists: £1,250
- Quarter-finalists: £650
- First round: £450

== Results ==
Last 16; Best of 9 frames
(Wales) Matthew Stevens	5
(Thailand) Noppadon Noppachorn	0
(Northern Ireland) Patrick Wallace	5
(England) Brett Patmore	4
(India) Yasin Merchant	5
(Scotland) Scott MacFarlane	1
(Northern Ireland) Joe Swail	5
(Belgium) Alain De Cock	2
(Belgium) Patrick Delsemme	5
(Belgium) Bjorn Haneveer	3
(Belgium) Steve Lemmens	5
(Malta) Joe Grech	4
(England) Darren Clarke	5
(Finland) Robin Hull	4
(England) Garoid O'Connor	5
(Belgium) Curd Persijn	4

Quarter-finals; Best of 9 frames
(Wales) Matthew Stevens	5
(Northern Ireland) Patrick Wallace	3
(India) Yasin Merchant	5
(Northern Ireland) Joe Swail	3
(Belgium) Patrick Delsemme	5
(Belgium) Steve Lemmens	2
(England) Darren Clarke	5
(England) Garoid O'Connor	4

Semi-finals; Best of 11 frames
(Wales) Matthew Stevens	6
(India) Yasin Merchant	3
(Belgium) Patrick Delsemme	6
(England) Darren Clarke	4

Final; Best of 13 frames
(Wales) Matthew Stevens	7
(Belgium) Patrick Delsemme	1
