= 1996 Malaysian Masters =

Invitational snooker tournament

Malaysian Masters
Tournament information
- Dates: 20–23 May 1996
- Venue: Genting Highlands
- City: Pahang
- Country: Malaysia
- Format: Non-ranking event

Final
- Champion: Dominic Dale (WAL)
- Runner-up: Drew Henry (SCO)
- Score: 8–3

The 1996 Genting Malaysian Masters was an invitational non-ranking snooker tournament, which took place between 20 and 23 May 1996 at the Genting Highlands in Pahang, Malaysia. Dominic Dale won the tournament defeating Drew Henry 8–3 in the final.

== Results ==
Last 16; Best of 11 frames
(Wales) Dominic Dale	6
(Thailand) Preecha Sae Be	4
(Finland) Robin Hull	6
(Malaysia) Ng Ann Seng	2
(Thailand) Noppadon Noppachorn	6
(Hong Kong) Wong Kong Wai	2
(Wales) John Herbert	6
(Malaysia) Erwin Ineng	1
(Scotland) Drew Henry	6
(China) Guo Hua	5
(Australia) Lim Cher Wee	w/o
(Belgium) Bjorn Haneveer	w/d
(Thailand) Tai Pichit	6
(Malaysia) Yong Kien Foot	0
(Malaysia) Sammy Chong	6
(Pakistan) Firhan Mirza	3

Quarter-finals; Best of 11 frames
(Wales) Dominic Dale	6
(Finland) Robin Hull	5
(Thailand) Noppadon Noppachorn	6
(Wales) John Herbert	4
(Scotland) Drew Henry	6
(Australia) Lim Cher Wee	0
(Thailand) Tai Pichit	6
(Malaysia) Sammy Chong	4

Semi-finals; Best of 13 frames
(Wales) Dominic Dale	7
(Thailand) Noppadon Noppachorn	6
(Scotland) Drew Henry	7
(Thailand) Tai Pichit	6

Final; Best of 15 frames
(Wales) Dominic Dale	8
(Scotland) Drew Henry	3
