= Matthew Stevens =

Welsh professional snooker player

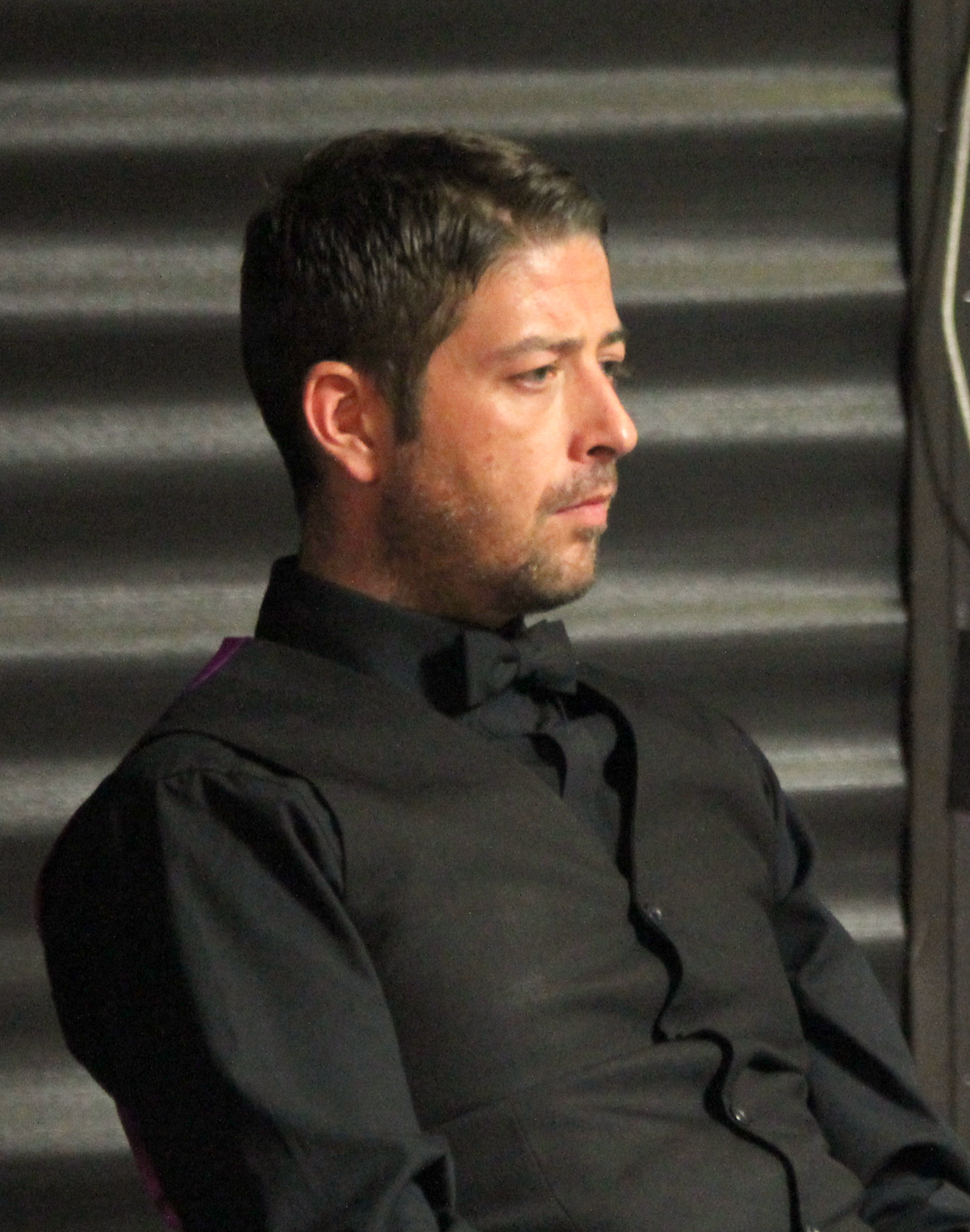
- Stevens at the 2016 Paul Hunter Classic

Personal information
- Nickname: The Welsh Dragon
- Born: 11 September 1977 (age 49) Carmarthen, Wales

Sport
- Country: Wales
- Sport: Snooker
- Professional: 1994–present
- Highest ranking: 4 (2005/06)
- Current ranking: 52 (as of 7 November 2026)
- Maximum breaks: 1
- Century breaks: 369 (as of 19 November 2026)

Tournament wins
- Ranking: 1

Matthew John Stevens (born 11 September 1977) is a Welsh professional snooker player. He has won two of the game's Triple Crown events—the Masters in 2000 and the UK Championship in 2003. He has also been a two-time runner-up in the other triple crown event, the World Snooker Championship, in 2000 and 2005. Stevens reached a career high ranking of No. 4 for the 2005/2006 season. Stevens has compiled more than 350 century breaks during his career.

== Career ==
=== Early career ===
Stevens became a professional snooker player in 1994; in his second season, he won the Benson & Hedges Championship to qualify for the Masters, where he beat Terry Griffiths 5–3 but lost 5–6 to Alan McManus. The following season, he beat Stephen Hendry 5–1 in the Grand Prix. In the 1997–98 season, he reached the semi-finals of both the Grand Prix and the UK Championship, achieving the highest break of the tournament at the latter. He also reached the quarter-finals on his debut at the Crucible in the World Championship, beating Alain Robidoux and Mark King before losing to Ken Doherty. In 1998, he reached his first ranking final at the UK Championship, losing 6–10 to John Higgins.

=== 2000–2005 ===
In the 1999–00 season Stevens got to all three finals of the Triple Crown events. In the final of the 1999 UK Championship he lost to Mark Williams 8–10. He won the 2000 Masters title, with a 10–8 win over Doherty in the final. At the 2000 World Championship, he achieved victories over Tony Drago, McManus, Jimmy White, and Joe Swail, before facing Williams in the final. Stevens lost 16–18, having led 10–6, 13–7, and then 14–10, with the final session to play. Stevens became only the second player in the history of the world championship to lose in the final from holding a four frame overnight lead. In 2002, he came within one frame from securing a place in the final, leading Peter Ebdon 16–14 in their semi-final tie, and requiring a red in the 31st frame to leave his opponent requiring snookers. When Stevens missed the pot, Ebdon made a clearance to win the frame and went on to take the next two frames to win the match 17–16.

Stevens won the 2003 UK Championship, after beating Hendry in the final. He trailed Hendry 0–4 at the first interval, before winning the next five frames; Hendry fought back to lead 7–5, but Stevens responded and clinched a 10–8 victory. This was the first ranking tournament victory of his career. He followed this achievement with a run of nine successive first round defeats in best-of-nine matches, only interrupted by a run to the semi-final of the 2004 World Championship.

He was runner-up at the 2005 World Championship, losing 16–18 to Shaun Murphy in the final, having been up 10–6, and then 12–11 with only the final session to play. He relinquished a four frame overnight lead to lose in the final, the third time this had happened in world championship history. Stevens insisted that Murphy had simply been the "better player" and that he believed he would eventually win the championship himself.

The following year, Stevens was beaten by Doherty 8–13 in the second round of the 2006 World Championship.

=== 2006–2010 ===
In 2007, Stevens lost 12–13 to Murphy in the quarter-finals of the World Championship, having led 11–5 and 12–7 earlier in the match, making him the first person to ever lose a best-of-25 match from a 12–7 lead. The defeat left him ranked outside the top 16 for the first time in eight years. In 2008, he was defeated in the first round of the World Championship for the first time in his career, by defending champion Higgins, and he finished ranked outside the top 16 for the second consecutive season. During the 2008–09 season, he reached the final of the Bahrain Championship, in which he was given a top 16 seeding due to the unavailability of three leading players. He only reached the last 16 of one other event, and failed to qualify for the World Championship after a defeat to Martin Gould. He finished the season with a drop of nine places to world number 26.

=== 2010/2011 ===
In the 2010–11 season, Stevens reached the quarter-finals of both the Shanghai Masters, losing to Ali Carter 4–5 on the final black, and at the Welsh Open, where he exited following a defeat by Higgins. He was not ranked in the top 16, so did not automatically qualify for the World Championship; in the fifth round of qualifying, he overcame Fergal O'Brien 10–9 on the final black to qualify for the first time since 2008. He was eliminated by Allen in the first round of the main draw, losing four consecutive frames after leading 9–6. He then won the 2011 Championship League, beating Williams 3–1 in the semi-final, and Murphy 3–1 in the final, to qualify for the Premier League.

His performances during the season were enough to see Stevens return to the elite top 16 in the world rankings for the first time since 2006, meaning he would no longer need to play qualifying matches to reach the main stage of the ranking events.

=== 2011/2012 ===
Stevens reached the quarter-finals of the Shanghai Masters. His run was ended by Williams, who whitewashed him 0–5. A last 16 exit in the 2011 UK Championship to Ding Junhui followed, before Stevens reached his second ranking event quarter-final of the season in the German Masters. He lost to Ronnie O'Sullivan 3–5.

Due to being ranked inside the top 16, Stevens played in his first Masters tournament since [2007, and was beaten by Higgins 2–6 in the first round. His first Premier League campaign since 2002 saw Stevens win 3 and lose 3 of the 6 matches he played to finish seventh in the ten-man league and therefore fail to make it to the play-offs. Stevens finished runner-up to O'Sullivan in Event 7 of the minor-ranking Players Tour Championship series and with last 16 finishes coming in Event 9 and Event 11, he was ranked 17th in the Order of Merit, inside the top 24 who qualified for the Finals. There he played Ricky Walden in the last 24 and lost 0–5 in 50 minutes.

Stevens was defeated in the second round of the Welsh Open and had successive first round losses in the World Open and China Open prior to entering the World Championship. Stevens reached his sixth semi-final in the event, and first since 2005. He reached the last four with wins over Marco Fu (10–3), Barry Hawkins (13–11) and Ryan Day (13–5, having won 11 consecutive frames). He played O'Sullivan in the semi-final and lost 10–17. Stevens finished the season ranked world number 10.

=== 2012/2013 ===
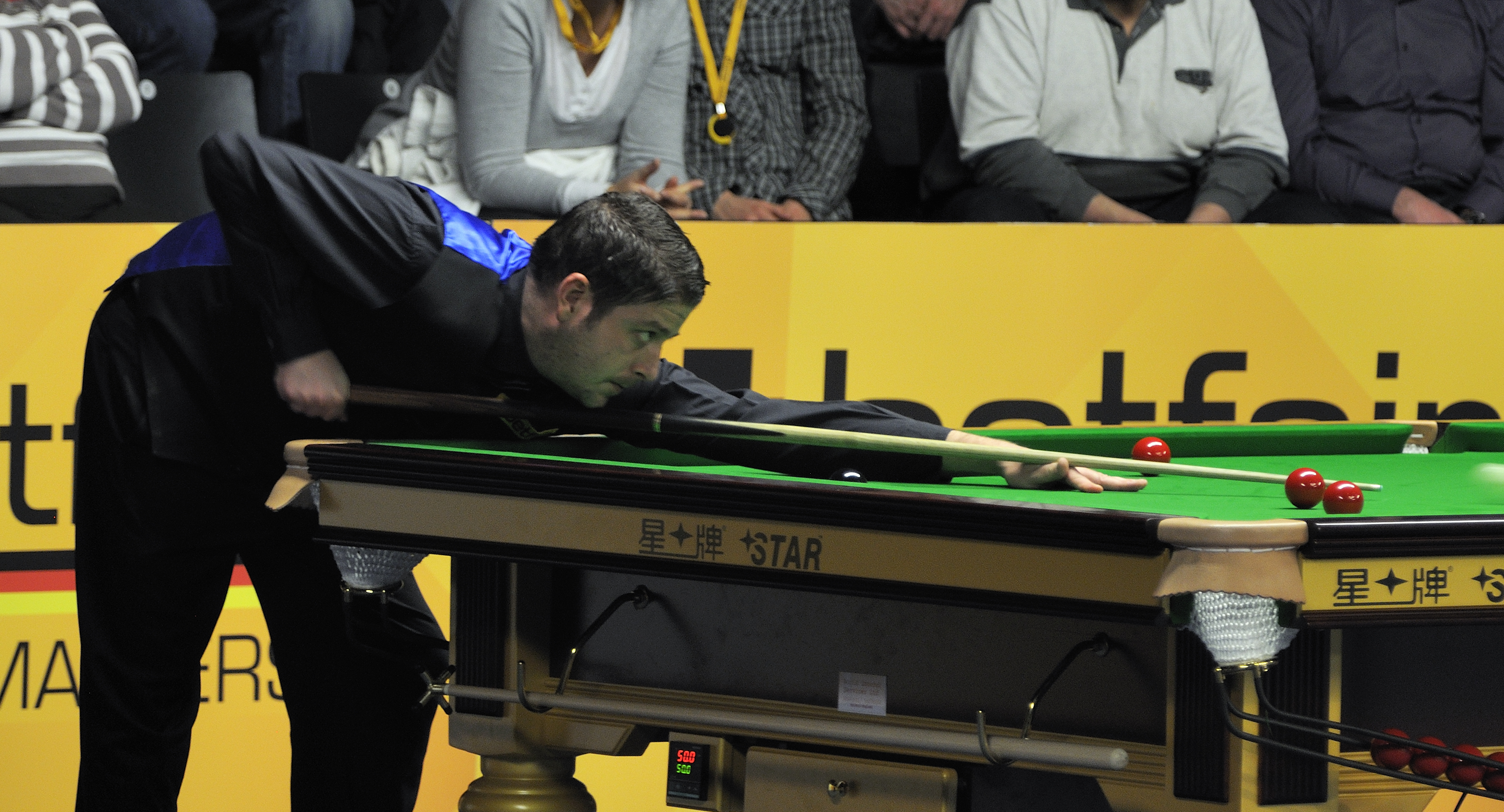
2013 German Masters

Stevens withdrew from the season's opening ranking event, the Wuxi Classic due to a bad back and could not advance beyond the second round in any of the next three events. At the 2012 UK Championship he beat Dominic Dale 6–1 and Fu 6–4 to reach the quarter-finals for the first time since lifting the trophy in 2003. In his game versus Mark Davis, Stevens was beaten 4–6. Stevens missed a brown at 4–1 up against Williams in the first round of the Masters and eventually lost 4–6. He also progressed to the quarter-final at the German Masters, where he was defeated 3–5 by Fu, before losing 2–4 to Stephen Maguire in the second round of the Welsh Open.

Stevens travelled to Haikou, China, for the World Open, but his cue failed to arrive on time for his first round match against David Gilbert. He beat Gilbert 5–4 with a borrowed cue and Murphy 5–3 with Mark Williams' cue before his own arrived for his quarter-final against Judd Trump. It was Trump this time who suffered cue troubles as his tip became damp during the match and Stevens took full advantage to triumph 5–3. He then came back from 4–5 against Neil Robertson in the semi-finals to win 6–5 and reach his first ranking event final since the 2008 Bahrain Championship. He faced Mark Allen in the final and was beaten 4–10. Stevens' season finished after he lost in first round of the China Open 2–5 to Rory McLeod and 7–10 to Fu in the World Championship, which saw him finish the year ranked world number 14.

=== 2013/2014 ===
At the season's opening ranking event, the 2013 Wuxi Classic, Stevens beat Lu Ning 5–1, Liang Wenbo and Peter Lines both 5–3, and David Morris 5–2, to advance to the semi-finals. He lost 2–6 to Higgins. At the International Championship, he defeated Higgins 6–2, before being eliminated by Ding 1–6 in the third round. He was beaten in the last 32 of the UK Championship 2–6 by Robert Milkins. He also lost deciding frames in the last 32 of the Welsh Open and World Open to Joe Perry and Trump respectively. He failed to qualify for the World Championship this year as he lost 8–10 to Tom Ford in the final qualifying round. Stevens dropped out of the top 16 and ended the year as world number 19.

=== 2014/2015 ===
At the 2014 Australian Goldfields Open, Stevens reached his first quarter-final in a year by knocking out Luca Brecel 5–3 and O'Brien 5–3, but lost 2–5 to Xiao Guodong. He was eliminated 2–6 by Higgins in the third round of the UK Championship, but reached the last 16 of the Welsh Open by recording his first victory over O'Sullivan in twelve years, recovering from 0–2 down to win 4–3. He lost 2–4 against Fu in the fourth round. He overcame Williams 10–2 at the World Championship, before suffering a heavy 5–13 defeat to O'Sullivan in the second round.

=== 2015/2016 ===
Stevens was eliminated at the first round stage of the International Championship and UK Championship, before achieving his first successes at a ranking event this season when he ousted Morris and Martin O'Donnell at the Welsh Open. In the third round against Gould, he lost 3–4. He reached the final round of qualifying for the World Championship, but was beaten 6–10 by Kyren Wilson.

=== 2016/2017 ===
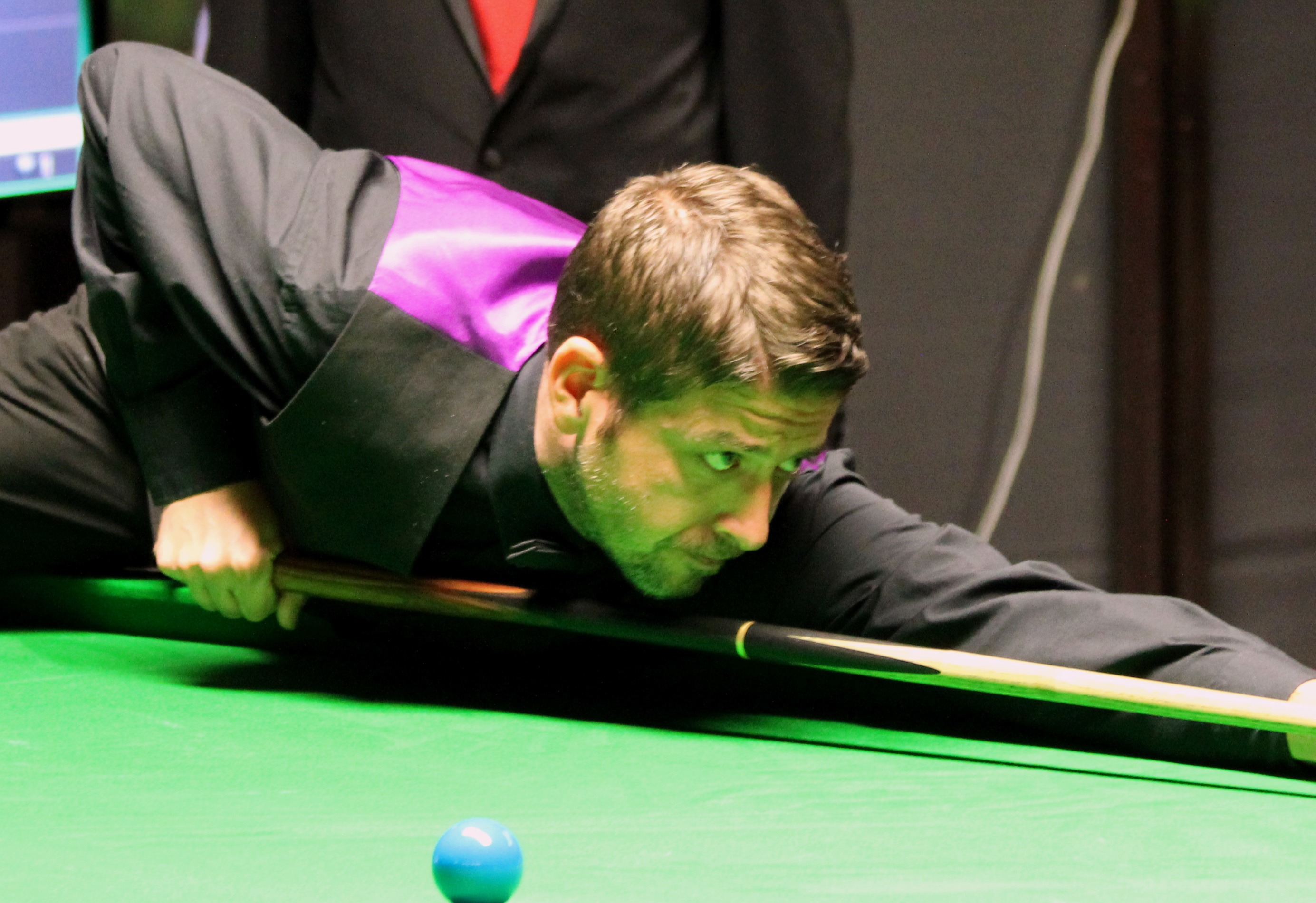
2016 Paul Hunter Classic

At the UK Championship, he beat James Cahill 6–1, Michael White 6–4, and Perry 6–2, but his run ended with a 2–6 loss to O'Sullivan. He failed to qualify for the World Championship for the second year in a row, after falling 8–10 to Lee Walker in the first qualifying round. His end of season ranking of 55 is the lowest he has finished a season since 1996.

=== After 2017 ===
Stevens reached the semifinal of the 2018 International Championship, having beaten Ding in the last sixteen. He lost the semifinal 9-6 to Allen. In the 2019 UK Championship, Stevens beat Mark Selby in the last 16 before losing to Maguire in the quarter-finals.

Stevens qualified for the World Snooker Championship in 2018, 2020, 2022 and 2026, but lost in qualifying all other years to date, including the 2025 World Championship, after a 9–10 defeat in the final round of qualifying to Wu Yize.

Stevens qualified for the 2026 World Championships, where he exited in the first round following a defeat to Hawkins.

== Personal life ==
Stevens was born in Carmarthen, Wales. He attended an all-Welsh-speaking school, Bro Myrddin Welsh Comprehensive School, and is fluent in the Welsh language. His career took off after beating Martyn Holloway in the Regal Welsh under 16s regional tournament in Morriston.

His father Morrell, who was also his manager, died unexpectedly in 2001. He was a close friend of Paul Hunter and was a pallbearer at his funeral. He is also a celebrity Texas hold 'em poker player and in 2004 won the UK's richest poker tournament, beating 16-time World Darts champion Phil Taylor to first place. Stevens had been playing poker for 18 months before his victory.

In 2015, Stevens was declared bankrupt and got divorced around the same time.

== Performance and rankings timeline ==
Tournament	1994/ 95	1995/ 96	1996/ 97	1997/ 98	1998/ 99	1999/ 00	2000/ 01	2001/ 02	2002/ 03	2003/ 04	2004/ 05	2005/ 06	2006/ 07	2007/ 08	2008/ 09	2009/ 10	2010/ 11	2011/ 12	2012/ 13	2013/ 14	2014/ 15	2015/ 16	2016/ 17	2017/ 18	2018/ 19	2019/ 20	2020/ 21	2021/ 22	2022/ 23	2023/ 24	2024/ 25	2025/ 26	2026/ 27
Ranking (Note: It shows the ranking at the beginning of the season)	(Note: New players on the Main Tour don't have a ranking)	236	67	53	26	9	6	6	8	9	6	4	14	20	17	26	25	14	10	14	19	28	44	55	47	43	33	36	56	42	48	52	49
Ranking tournaments
Championship League	Tournament Not Held													Non-Ranking Event													RR	2R	RR	2R	2R	2R	RR
China Open (Note: The event was called the China International (1997/1998–1998/1999))	Not Held			NR	2R	2R	QF	1R	Not Held		1R	1R	2R	1R	LQ	LQ	1R	1R	1R	LQ	1R	1R	2R	1R	LQ	Tournament Not Held							LQ
Wuhan Open	Tournament Not Held																													LQ	LQ	1R	LQ
British Open	LQ	1R	LQ	2R	1R	1R	3R	2R	3R	SF	2R	Tournament Not Held																1R	3R	2R	LQ	1R	1R
English Open	Tournament Not Held																						1R	3R	3R	1R	4R	LQ	LQ	LQ	1R	LQ	LQ
Shenzhen Open (Note: The event was called the Xi'an Grand Prix (2024/2025–2025/2026))	Tournament Not Held																														1R	2R	LQ
Northern Ireland Open	Tournament Not Held																						1R	2R	3R	2R	3R	2R	LQ	1R	1R	LQ	1R
International Championship	Tournament Not Held																		2R	3R	1R	1R	2R	LQ	SF	1R	Not Held			1R	2R	1R	LQ
UK Championship	LQ	2R	LQ	SF	F	F	3R	QF	3R	W	2R	2R	3R	LQ	2R	1R	1R	2R	QF	3R	3R	1R	4R	1R	2R	QF	WD	1R	1R	LQ	LQ	LQ	
Shoot Out	Tournament Not Held																Non-Ranking Event						1R	3R	1R	2R	3R	1R	1R	2R	2R	1R	
Scottish Open (Note: The event was called the International Open (1994/1995–1996/1997) and the Players Championship (2003/2004))	LQ	LQ	LQ	LQ	3R	QF	QF	2R	3R	2R	Tournament Not Held								MR	Not Held			2R	1R	4R	2R	2R	LQ	1R	1R	LQ	2R	
German Masters (Note: The event was called the German Open (1995/1996–1997/1998))	NH	LQ	LQ	LQ	NR	Tournament Not Held											1R	QF	QF	2R	LQ	LQ	LQ	LQ	1R	LQ	LQ	LQ	1R	1R	LQ	LQ	LQ
Welsh Open	LQ	1R	LQ	1R	3R	QF	1R	2R	1R	2R	2R	3R	2R	1R	1R	2R	QF	2R	2R	3R	4R	3R	1R	4R	1R	3R	2R	3R	1R	1R	3R	LQ	
World Grand Prix	Tournament Not Held																				NR	DNQ	DNQ	DNQ	1R	2R	DNQ	DNQ	DNQ	DNQ	DNQ	DNQ	
Players Championship (Note: The event was called the Players Tour Championship Grand Final (2010/2011–2015/2016))	Tournament Not Held																SF	1R	DNQ	DNQ	DNQ	DNQ	DNQ	DNQ	DNQ	DNQ	DNQ	DNQ	DNQ	DNQ	DNQ	DNQ	
World Open (Note: The event was called the Grand Prix (1994/1995–2000/2001 and 2004/2005–2009/2010) and the LG Cup (2001/2002–2003/2004))	LQ	3R	2R	SF	1R	2R	3R	3R	2R	QF	1R	1R	2R	RR	LQ	1R	1R	1R	F	2R	Not Held		1R	1R	WD	1R	Not Held			2R	1R	1R	
Tour Championship	Tournament Not Held																								DNQ	DNQ	DNQ	DNQ	DNQ	DNQ	DNQ	DNQ	
World Championship	LQ	LQ	LQ	QF	QF	F	SF	SF	2R	SF	F	2R	QF	1R	LQ	LQ	1R	SF	1R	LQ	2R	LQ	LQ	1R	LQ	1R	LQ	1R	LQ	LQ	LQ	1R	
Non-ranking tournaments
The Masters	LQ	1R	LQ	LQ	LQ	W	1R	1R	1R	1R	1R	1R	1R	WD	LQ	LQ	A	1R	1R	A	A	A	A	A	A	A	A	A	A	A	A	A	
Championship League	Tournament Not Held													RR	RR	A	W	RR	RR	RR	RR	A	A	A	A	A	A	A	A	A	A	A	
Former ranking tournaments
Asian Classic (Note: The event was called the Dubai Classic (1994/1995) and the Thailand Classic (1995/1996))	LQ	WR	LQ	Tournament Not Held																													
Malta Grand Prix	Non-Ranking Event					2R	NR	Tournament Not Held																									
Thailand Masters (Note: The event was called the Thailand Open (1994/1995–1996/1997))	LQ	LQ	LQ	LQ	1R	QF	QF	SF	NR	Not Held			NR	Tournament Not Held																			
Irish Masters	Non-Ranking Event								QF	1R	F	NH	NR	Tournament Not Held																			
Northern Ireland Trophy	Tournament Not Held											NR	3R	1R	1R	Tournament Not Held																	
Bahrain Championship	Tournament Not Held														F	Tournament Not Held																	
Wuxi Classic (Note: The event was called the Jiangsu Classic (2008/2009–2009/2010))	Tournament Not Held														Non-Ranking Event				WD	SF	LQ	Tournament Not Held											
Australian Goldfields Open (Note: The event was called the Australian Open (1994/1995–1995/1996) and the Australian Masters (1995/1996))	Non-Ranking		Tournament Not Held															1R	2R	A	QF	A	Tournament Not Held										
Shanghai Masters	Tournament Not Held													QF	1R	2R	QF	QF	1R	1R	LQ	LQ	LQ	1R	Non-Ranking		Not Held			Non-Ranking Event			
Paul Hunter Classic (Note: The event was called the Grand Prix Fürth (2004/2005) and the Fürth German Open (2005/2006–2006/2007))	Tournament Not Held										Pro-am Event						Minor-Ranking Event						2R	3R	A	NR	Tournament Not Held						
Indian Open	Tournament Not Held																			LQ	1R	NH	2R	LQ	A	Tournament Not Held							
Riga Masters (Note: The event was called the Riga Open (2014/2015–2015/2016))	Tournament Not Held																				Minor-Rank		3R	1R	LQ	A	Tournament Not Held						
China Championship	Tournament Not Held																						NR	3R	LQ	2R	Tournament Not Held						
WST Pro Series	Tournament Not Held																										RR	Tournament Not Held					
Turkish Masters	Tournament Not Held																											2R	Tournament Not Held				
Gibraltar Open	Tournament Not Held																					MR	1R	2R	WD	A	1R	2R	Tournament Not Held				
WST Classic	Tournament Not Held																												2R	Tournament Not Held			
European Masters (Note: The event was called the European Open (1994/1995–1996/1997 and 2001/2002–2003/2004), the Irish Open (1998/1999) and the Malta Cup (2004/2005–2007/2008))	LQ	LQ	1R	NH	LQ	Not Held		2R	2R	1R	SF	1R	1R	NR	Tournament Not Held								LQ	LQ	LQ	LQ	3R	1R	1R	1R	Not Held		
Saudi Arabia Masters	Tournament Not Held																														3R	4R	NH
Former non-ranking tournaments
Belgian Masters	NH	W	Tournament Not Held																														
China Masters	NH	SF	Tournament Not Held																														
Pontins Professional	A	A	A	A	F	SF	Tournament Not Held																										
Malta Grand Prix	A	A	A	A	A	R	RR	Tournament Not Held																									
Champions Cup (Note: The event run under different name as Charity Challenge (1994/1995–1998/1999))	A	A	A	A	A	A	RR	A	Tournament Not Held																								
Scottish Masters	A	A	A	A	LQ	W	QF	QF	1R	Tournament Not Held																							
Northern Ireland Trophy	Tournament Not Held											W	Ranking Event			Tournament Not Held																	
Irish Masters	A	A	A	A	A	QF	QF	SF	Ranking Event			NH	RR	Tournament Not Held																			
Pot Black	Tournament Not Held											W	QF	A	Tournament Not Held																		
Masters Qualifying Event (Note: The event was called the Benson & Hedges Championship (1993/1994-2002/2003))	SF	W	QF	1R	2R	A	A	A	A	A	NH	A	A	1R	SF	QF	Tournament Not Held																
Wuxi Classic	Tournament Not Held														A	A	A	1R	Ranking Event			Tournament Not Held											
Power Snooker	Tournament Not Held																A	1R	Tournament Not Held														
Premier League (Note: The event was called the European League (1994/1995–1996/1997))	A	A	A	A	A	A	A	RR	A	A	A	A	A	A	A	A	A	RR	A	Tournament Not Held													
Shoot Out	Tournament Not Held																1R	2R	1R	QF	1R	1R	Ranking Event										
Six-red World Championship (Note: The event was called the Six-red Snooker International (2008/2009) and the Six-red World Grand Prix (2009/2010))	Tournament Not Held														A	2R	A	NH	2R	3R	2R	RR	A	A	A	A	Not Held		LQ	Tournament Not Held			

Performance Table Legend
LQ	lost in the qualifying draw	#R	lost in the early rounds of the tournament (WR = Wildcard round, RR = Round robin)	QF	lost in the quarter-finals
SF	lost in the semi-finals	F	lost in the final	W	won the tournament
DNQ	did not qualify for the tournament	A	did not participate in the tournament	WD	withdrew from the tournament

NH / Not Held	means an event was not held.
NR / Non-Ranking Event	means an event is/was no longer a ranking event.
R / Ranking Event	means an event is/was a ranking event.
MR / Minor-Ranking Event	means an event is/was a minor-ranking event.
PA / Pro-am Event	means an event is/was a pro-am event.

== Career finals ==
=== Ranking finals: 8 (1 title) ===
Legend
World Championship (0–2)
UK Championship (1–2)
Other (0–3)

Outcome	No.	Year	Championship	Opponent in the final	Score
Runner-up	1.	1998	UK Championship	(Scotland) John Higgins	6–10
Runner-up	2.	1999	UK Championship (2)	(Wales) Mark Williams	8–10
Runner-up	3.	2000	World Snooker Championship	(Wales) Mark Williams	16–18
Winner	1.	2003	UK Championship	(Scotland) Stephen Hendry	10–8
Runner-up	4.	2005	Irish Masters	(England) Ronnie O'Sullivan	8–10
Runner-up	5.	2005	World Snooker Championship (2)	(England) Shaun Murphy	16–18
Runner-up	6.	2008	Bahrain Championship	(Australia) Neil Robertson	7–9
Runner-up	7.	2013	World Open	(Northern Ireland) Mark Allen	4–10

=== Minor-ranking finals: 1 ===
Outcome	No.	Year	Championship	Opponent in the final	Score
Runner-up	1.	2011	Kay Suzanne Memorial Trophy	(England) Ronnie O'Sullivan	2–4

=== Non-ranking finals: 8 (7 titles) ===
Legend
The Masters (1–0)
Other (6–1)

Outcome	No.	Year	Championship	Opponent in the final	Score
Winner	1.	1995	Benson & Hedges Championship	(Scotland) Paul McPhillips	9–3
Winner	2.	1996	Belgian Masters	(Belgium) Patrick Delsemme	7–1
Runner-up	1.	1999	Pontins Professional	(England) Jimmy White	5–9
Winner	3.	1999	Scottish Masters	(Scotland) John Higgins	9–7
Winner	4.	2000	The Masters	(Republic of Ireland) Ken Doherty	10–8
Winner	5.	2005	Northern Ireland Trophy	(Scotland) Stephen Hendry	9–7
Winner	6.	2005	Pot Black	(England) Shaun Murphy	1–0
Winner	7.	2011	Championship League	(England) Shaun Murphy	3–1

=== Pro-am finals: 1 ===
Outcome	No.	Year	Championship	Opponent in the final	Score
Runner-up	1.	2004	Grand Prix Fürth	(England) Paul Hunter	2–4

=== Team finals: 2 (1 title) ===
Outcome	No.	Year	Championship	Team/partner	Opponent(s) in the final	Score
Winner	1.	1999	Nations Cup	Wales	Scotland	6–4
Runner-up	1.	2000	Nations Cup	Wales	England	2–6
