= Peter Ebdon =

English snooker player (born 1970)

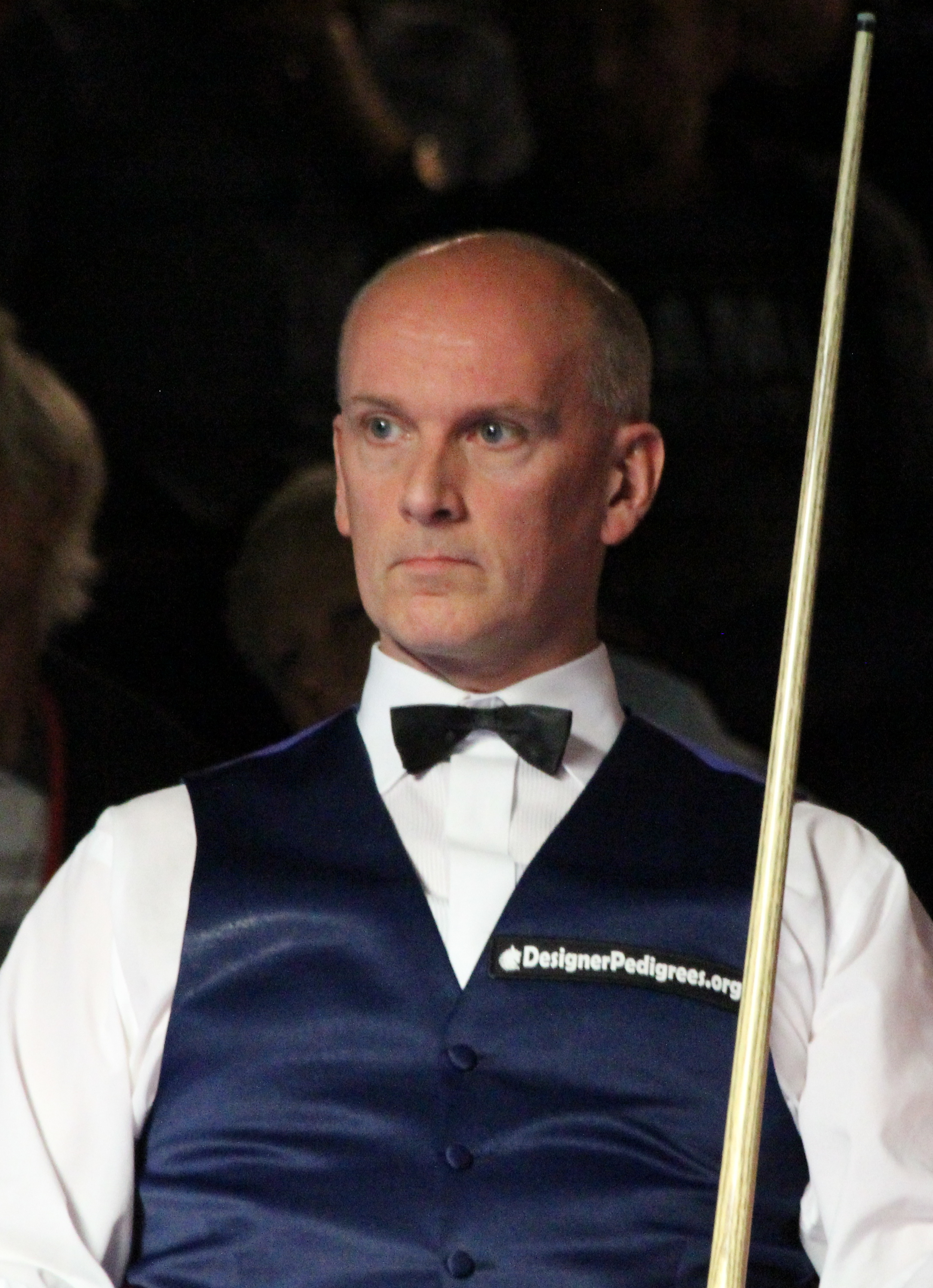
- Ebdon in 2018

Personal information
- Nickname: The Force
- Born: 27 August 1970 (age 56) Islington, London, England

Sport
- Country: England
- Sport: Snooker
- Professional: 1991–2020
- Highest ranking: 3 (1996/97 & 2002/03)
- Maximum breaks: 2
- Century breaks: 377

Tournament wins
- Ranking: 9
- World Championship: 2002

Peter David Ebdon (born 27 August 1970) is an English former professional snooker player who is a former world champion and current coach. Ebdon won nine ranking titles during his career, placing him in joint 14th position (with John Parrott) on the all-time list of ranking tournament winners. He won two Triple Crown titles: the 2002 World Snooker Championship, defeating Stephen Hendry 18–17 in a final-frame decider, and the 2006 UK Championship, in which he again defeated Hendry in the final, 10–6.

After winning the 1990 IBSF World Under-21 Snooker Championship, Ebdon turned professional in the 1991–92 season. He made his first Crucible appearance at the 1992 World Snooker Championship, reaching the quarter-finals on his debut. Winning his first professional ranking title at the 1993 Grand Prix helped him enter the top 16 in the world rankings for the 1994–95 season; he remained consistently in the top 16 until the end of the 2009–10 season, reaching a career high of third. He made 24 Crucible appearances during his career and reached three World Championship finals, losing 12–18 to Stephen Hendry in 1996, defeating Hendry 18–17 in 2002, and losing 14–18 to Graeme Dott in 2006. He won his last ranking title at the 2012 China Open and reached the last of his 18 ranking event finals at the 2018 Paul Hunter Classic losing 2–4 to Kyren Wilson. He retired from the professional tour at the end of the 2019–20 season, aged 49, due to chronic neck and spinal pain. Ebdon announced his retirement from professional snooker on 30 April 2020, stating that he was unwilling to undergo spinal surgery in an effort to remain in the sport.

Known for his intensity and his often controversially slow playing style, Ebdon made 377 century breaks in professional competition, including two maximum breaks. Since retiring as a player, Ebdon has coached and mentored current professionals including Shaun Murphy, Jack Lisowski, Anthony McGill, Elliot Slessor, and Kyren Wilson.

== Career ==
=== Amateur career ===
From the mid-1980s, Ebdon took part in various amateur tournaments and became one of the leading amateurs of his era. He won the 1990 IBSF World Under-21 Snooker Championship, defeating Oliver King 11–9 in the final.

=== Early professional career and World Championship win (1991–2002) ===
Ebdon turned professional in 1991. Making his Crucible debut at the 1992 World Championship, he defeated Steve Davis 10–4 in the first round and went on to reach the quarter-finals, losing 7–13 to Terry Griffiths. This earned Ebdon the WPBSA's Young Player of the Year award. He won his first ranking title at the 1993 Grand Prix, defeating Ken Doherty 9–6 in the final. His second title was the 1995 Irish Masters, defeating Stephen Hendry 9–8 in the final, and reached his first Triple Crown final at the 1995 UK Championship, but lost 3–10 to Hendry. He first entered the top 16 for the 1994–95 season, and rose to a career high of third in the 1996–97 season, a position he reached again in the 2002–03 season.

At the 1996 World Snooker Championship, Ebdon defeated Jimmy White in the last 16, Steve Davis in the quarter-finals, and Ronnie O'Sullivan in the semi-finals to reach his first world final, which he lost 12–18 to Hendry. He won the 1997 Thailand Open, defeating Nigel Bond 9–7 in the final; the 2000 British Open, defeating White 9–6 in the final; and the 2001 Scottish Open, defeating Doherty 9–7 in the final.

Ebdon defeated Michael Judge, Joe Perry, Anthony Hamilton, and Matthew Stevens to reach his second world final at the 2002 World Snooker Championship. He won his only world title, clinching an 18–17 victory over Hendry. Having started the tournament at odds of 33–1, he stated: "It's what I have been working for and dreaming about for the last 17 years... I wasn't ready to win it six years ago, but I've improved as a player and as a person".

=== Post–World Championship win (2002–2011) ===
Defending his title at the 2003 World Championship, Ebdon faced Paul Hunter in the quarter-finals. Ebdon came from 10 to 12 behind to force a deciding frame, but Hunter clinched a 13–12 victory after a match that lasted 8 hours and 4 minutes. The slower pace of Ebdon's play after his world title attracted criticism, especially when he played O'Sullivan in the 2005 World Championship quarter-finals. Ebdon began the third session of the match trailing 6–10, but won seven of the last eight frames for a 13–11 victory, despite making a highest break of 60 and having an average shot time of 37 seconds. At one stage, Ebdon took three minutes over a shot, and took five minutes to compile a break of 12. Ebdon stated after the match: "When I'm trying my hardest I seem to go slow. I don't do it intentionally". When The Times described his slow play as "cheating", he sued for libel.

At the 2006 World Snooker Championship, Ebdon led Marco Fu 15–9 in the semi-finals. Fu won seven of the next eight frames to tie the scores at 16–16, but Ebdon won the deciding frame to reach his third world final, where he faced Graeme Dott. Trailing 7–15 before the final session, Ebdon won six successive frames, but Dott won the match 18–14. Later that year, Ebdon won his second Triple Crown title at the 2006 UK Championship, defeating Ding Junhui in the quarter-finals, John Higgins in the semi-finals, and Hendry 10–6 in the final.

At the 2008 World Championship, Ebdon defeated Mark King 13–9 in the second round to reach the quarter-finals. He lost 9–13 to Ali Carter, who made a maximum break during the match. This was the last time Ebdon featured in the later stages of a World Championship; his final seven Crucible appearances all ended in first-round defeats.

In the 2008 Northern Ireland Trophy, Ebdon lost 0–5 to Liang Wenbo, making a highest break of 32. After the match, the Gambling Commission expressed concern about attempts by punters to place unusually large bets for Ebdon to lose 0–5 and not to make a break over 50. However, the WPBSA did not instigate a match-fixing investigation. Ebdon won the 2009 China Open with a 10–8 victory over John Higgins in the final, but lost 5–10 to Bond in the first round of the 2009 World Championship. After a disappointing 2009–10 season, Ebdon lost 5–10 to Dott in the first round of the 2010 World Championship. This result ended Ebdon's 16 consecutive seasons ranked within the top 16 in the world rankings. Ebdon stated he was "bitterly disappointed but also very proud" to have been in the top 16 for so many years.

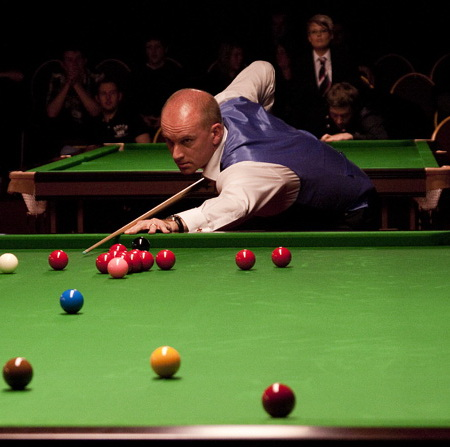
Ebdon at the 2010 Brugge Open

At the 2010 World Open, Ebdon reached the semi-finals, losing 1–3 to O'Sullivan. His first semi-final appearance since the 2009 China Open, it saw him re-enter the top 16. Ebdon lost in the first round of the 2010 UK Championship and lost 8–10 to Stuart Bingham in the first round of the 2011 World Championship. However, Ebdon was ranked number 13 at the end of the season.

=== Fall from the top 16 (2011–15) ===
Ebdon fell out of the top 16 again early in the 2011–12 season, meaning he had to qualify for the main stage of ranking events thereafter. He lost his first 2011 UK Championship qualifying match 3–6 to Robert Milkins, meaning that he did not feature at the tournament's main stage for the first time since 1991. He missed the 2012 Masters, the first time he had not featured at the event since 1992. At the PTC series, he played in all 12 events, but won only four matches all season. He finished 98th in the Order of Merit and fell to number 28 in the rankings in March 2012.

Ebdon won the 2012 China Open, defeating John Higgins, Neil Robertson, and Ding before beating Stephen Maguire 10–9 in the final. This boosted his ranking to number 21. During the final, he recorded his 300th century break. At the 2012 World Championship, he recorded a 10–0 whitewash over Alfie Burden in qualifying, but lost 4–10 to O'Sullivan in the first round. He finished the season ranked world number 20.

Ebdon began the 2012–13 season by qualifying for the Wuxi Classic, but lost 4–5 to Bingham in the first round. At the Australian Goldfields Open, he defeated Michael Holt, Ding, and Shaun Murphy, all by 5–4 scorelines. His match against Ding provoked controversy, with Ebdon recording an average shot time of 32 seconds in a nine-frame encounter that lasted almost five hours. Judd Trump on Twitter called it a "joke" that Ebdon was permitted to play so slowly. In the semi-finals, Ebdon defeated Fu 6–2, despite his opponent having an over 90 percent pot success, 80 percent long pot success, and 80 percent safety success. Facing Barry Hawkins in the final, Ebdon lost 3–9, admitting afterwards that he had struggled in every department of his game. He lost in the first round of the 2012 Shanghai Masters, but reached the semi-finals of the inaugural 2012 International Championship, where he lost 1–9 to Trump.

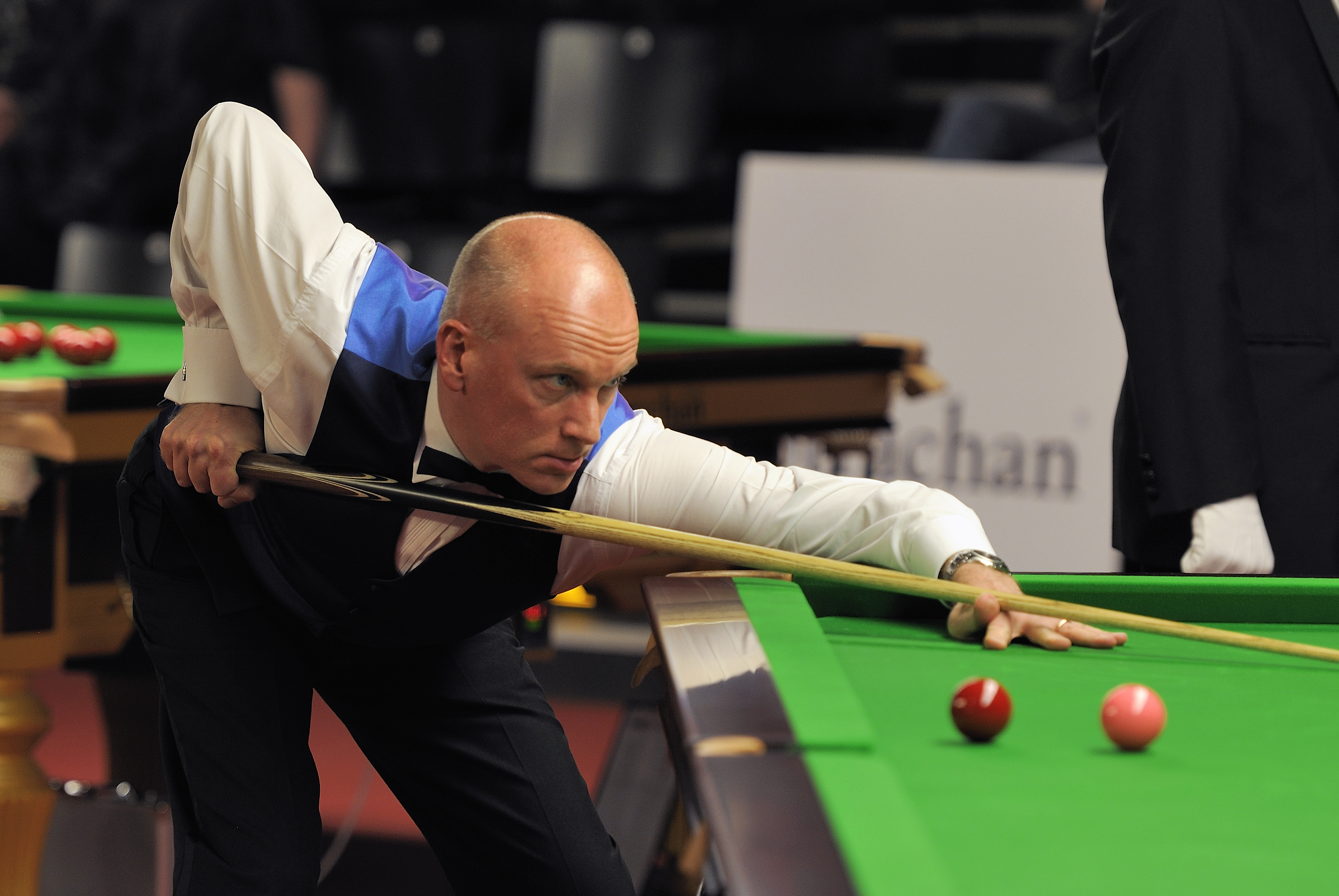
Ebdon at the 2014 German Masters

By qualifying for the 2013 World Championship, Ebdon equalled Steve Davis's then-record 22 consecutive appearances in the tournament. He faced Dott in a match that lasted seven hours, spread over three sessions, as Ebdon recovered from 2–6 behind to level at 6–6, before losing 6–10. After the match, Dott called for rules to combat slow play. Ebdon fell to world number 30 in the world rankings after the tournament.

Ebdon's run of 22 consecutive Crucible appearances ended at the 2014 World Snooker Championship, when he lost 8–10 to Robin Hull in qualifying, missing the event's main stage for the first time since turning professional. He failed to qualify for the event again in 2015, losing 7–10 to Stuart Carrington in the second qualifying round.

=== Later career and retirement (2015–20) ===
At the 2015 UK Championship, Ebdon beat opponents including reigning world champion Bingham to reach the last 16, where he lost 2–6 to David Grace. At 45, he was the oldest competitor at the 2016 World Grand Prix; he defeated Robertson 4–3 before Ding whitewashed him 0–4 in the second round. At the 2016 World Championship, Ebdon defeated James Wattana 10–6 in the first qualifying round. He came from 3–9 behind against Gerard Greene to win 10–9 in the second round, the match ending just after 2:00 a.m. He qualified for the Crucible for the first time in three years by defeating Ian Burns 10–2 in the final qualifying round. However, he lost 2–10 to Fu in the first round.

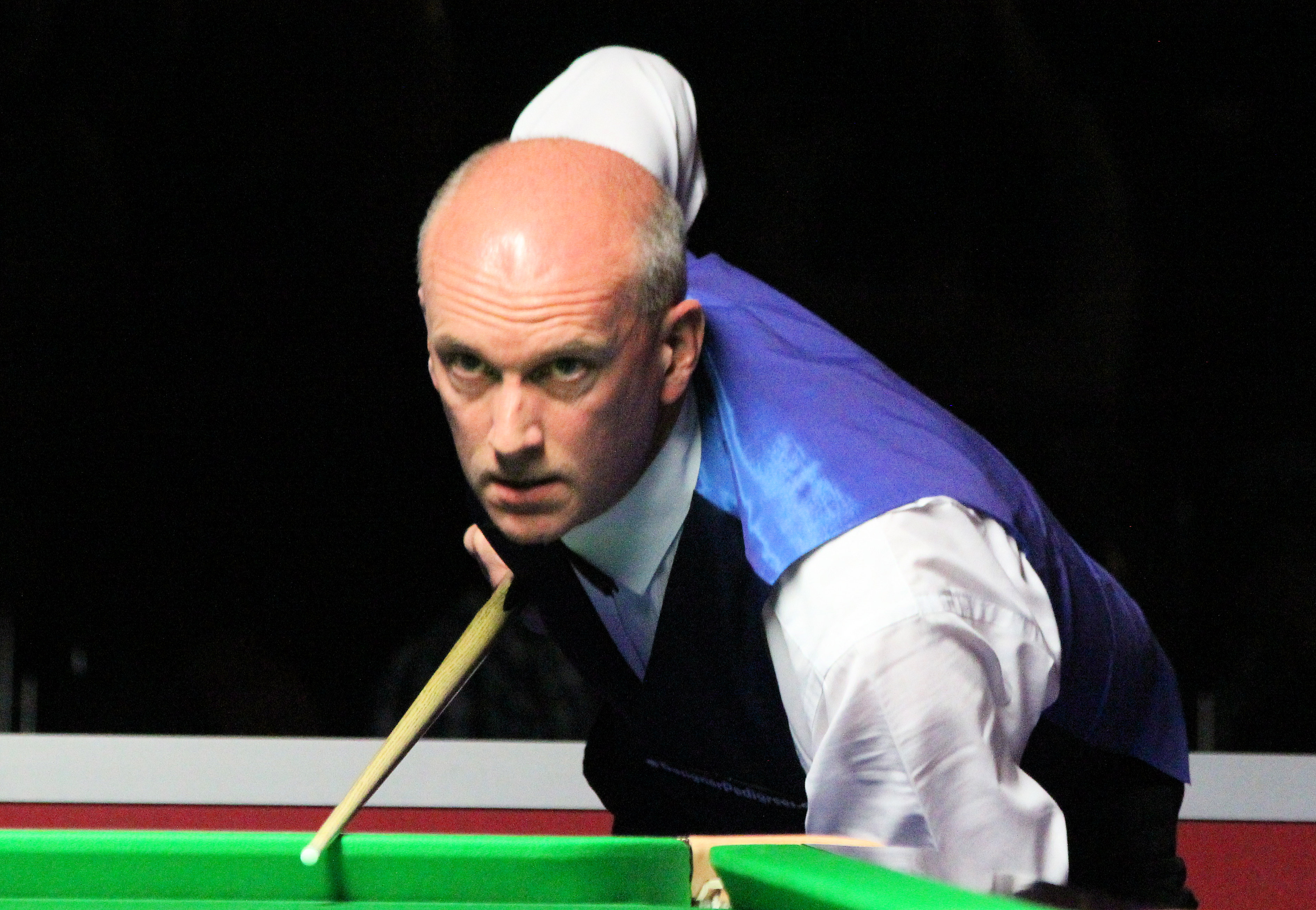
Ebdon playing at the 2018 Paul Hunter Classic, where he finished as runner-up

Ebdon reached the quarter-finals of the 2016 Indian Open, where he lost 3–4 to Bond. He made his 24th and last Crucible appearance at the 2017 World Championship, after beating Holt 10–9 on the final black to qualify. He won the ninth frame of his first-round match against Bingham on a re-spotted black, after having required four snookers, and trailed 4–5 overnight; however, he lost the match 5–10. He ended the season ranked 40th in the world, the first time since 1992 he had finished a season outside the top 32.

Ebdon reached his 18th and last ranking event final at the 2018 Paul Hunter Classic, where he lost 2–4 to Kyren Wilson. He played his last professional match at the 2020 German Masters qualifiers in December 2019, losing 4–5 to Stevens. Following months of chronic neck and spinal pain, Ebdon announced his retirement from professional snooker on 30 April 2020, stating that he was unwilling to undergo spinal surgery in an effort to remain in the sport.

=== Coaching career (2021–present) ===
In 2021, Ebdon became mentor and coach to Jack Lisowski, who reached his first world quarter-final at the 2022 World Championship and credited his improved performance to Ebdon. As of 2023 Ebdon also coaches and mentors current professionals Anthony McGill, Elliot Slessor, and Kyren Wilson.

== Status ==
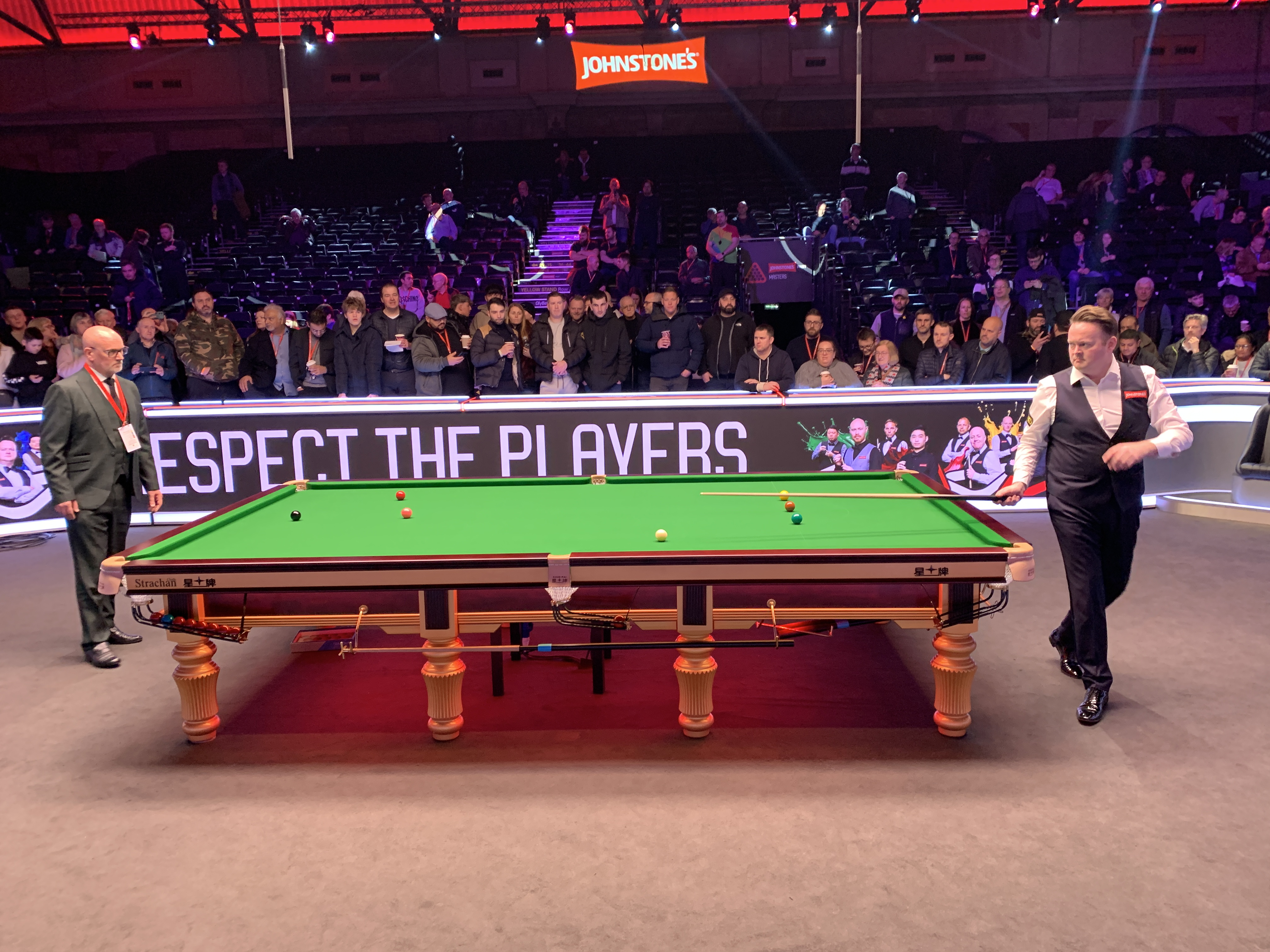
Peter Ebdon (left) and Shaun Murphy (right) at the 2025 Masters

Ebdon was the third player to make two competitive maximum breaks in professional tournament play—at the Strachan Professional and UK Championship, both in 1992. In the same year, he became the first player to make four centuries in five frames. He won World Championship and UK Championship titles but never completed a career Triple Crown; his best Masters performances were semi-finals at the 1995 and 2005 events, which he lost respectively to O'Sullivan and Higgins. Ebdon was criticised by other professionals for his slow play as well as his exuberant outpourings of emotion after winning important frames or matches, with O'Sullivan once calling him a "psycho".

== Personal life ==
Born in Islington, London, Ebdon later moved to Wellingborough, Northamptonshire. He attended Highbury Grove School, where he played oboe in the school orchestra, studied Latin and Greek, and represented North London at cricket. He dropped out of school to pursue his snooker career, after which his father did not speak to him for six months. Ebdon later stated that he regretted not sitting his O levels.

In the early years of his professional career, Ebdon became known for wearing his hair in a ponytail. He is also colour blind. While playing snooker, he often asked the referee for help on distinguishing the brown ball from red balls. In several notable matches, Ebdon played foul shots because he confused the two colours.

He had four children with his first wife Deborah. In 2005, he emigrated to Dubai with his wife and children, stating that the move was due to tax reasons, lower crime rates, and better weather. He lived there until 2009, when he announced that he and Deborah had separated by mutual consent after 16 years of marriage. In 2010, Ebdon married his second wife, Nora, whom he first met at a players' party at a snooker event in Austria. After their marriage, they lived in Nora's home country of Hungary. Ebdon was declared bankrupt in 2015.

Ebdon became known for his focus on fitness, including swimming one mile every day. In 2012, he adopted a vegan diet. He is a devotee of Napoleon Hill's motivational book Think and Grow Rich. In 2018, he became a professional healer at the College of Healing in Malvern. He has a longstanding interest in breeding racehorses. He has released three music singles.

Shortly after his retirement, Ebdon was criticised for promoting conspiracy theories. In a May 2020 interview on BBC Radio 5 Live, he discussed the COVID-19 pandemic, calling social distancing guidelines "harmful", stating that people were being "brainwashed", and claiming that the public was "facing the greatest psychological operation in history". During the interview, Ebdon referenced individuals who had made unsubstantiated claims about topics such as the September 11 attacks and the Manchester Arena bombing, prompting Telegraph sports journalist James Corrigan to ask if winning the World Snooker Championship "gives you the right to propagate wild conspiracy theories on a national radio show".

== Performance and rankings timeline ==
Tournament	1991/ 92	1992/ 93	1993/ 94	1994/ 95	1995/ 96	1996/ 97	1997/ 98	1998/ 99	1999/ 00	2000/ 01	2001/ 02	2002/ 03	2003/ 04	2004/ 05	2005/ 06	2006/ 07	2007/ 08	2008/ 09	2009/ 10	2010/ 11	2011/ 12	2012/ 13	2013/ 14	2014/ 15	2015/ 16	2016/ 17	2017/ 18	2018/ 19	2019/ 20
Ranking (Note: From the 2010/2011 season it shows the ranking at the beginning of the season.)	(Note: New players on the Main Tour don't have a ranking.)	47	21	10	10	3	5	7	13	12	7	3	7	8	7	7	6	9	14	18	13	20	30	25	31	31	40	55	47
Ranking tournaments
Riga Masters (Note: The event was called the Riga Open (2014/2015–2015/2016))	Tournament Not Held																							MR		LQ	1R	LQ	LQ
International Championship	Tournament Not Held																					SF	QF	3R	2R	LQ	1R	LQ	1R
China Championship	Tournament Not Held																									NR	1R	1R	LQ
English Open	Tournament Not Held																									1R	1R	2R	1R
World Open (Note: The event was called the Grand Prix (1991/1992–2000/2001 and 2004/2005–2009/2010), the LG Cup (2001/2002–2003/2004) and the Haikou World Open (2011/2012–2013/2014))	3R	3R	W	3R	3R	1R	1R	QF	1R	3R	F	2R	2R	3R	2R	RR	QF	2R	QF	SF	LQ	1R	LQ	Not Held		1R	3R	1R	WD
Northern Ireland Open	Tournament Not Held																									3R	1R	QF	2R
UK Championship	LQ	1R	2R	SF	F	1R	2R	1R	1R	3R	QF	SF	3R	3R	3R	W	1R	2R	2R	1R	LQ	LQ	2R	3R	4R	1R	2R	2R	2R
Scottish Open (Note: The event was called the International Open (1992/1993–1996/1997) and the Players Championship (2003/2004))	NH	3R	1R	3R	1R	SF	3R	3R	3R	W	SF	2R	SF	Tournament Not Held								MR	Not Held			2R	3R	1R	3R
European Masters (Note: The event was called the Irish Open (1998/1999) and Malta Cup (2004/2005–2007/2008))	1R	2R	LQ	1R	F	QF	NH	2R	Not Held		1R	SF	1R	2R	1R	SF	NR	Tournament Not Held								LQ	2R	1R	LQ
German Masters (Note: The event was called the German Open (1995/1996–1997/1998))	Tournament Not Held				2R	1R	1R	NR	Tournament Not Held											2R	1R	1R	2R	2R	LQ	1R	LQ	2R	LQ
World Grand Prix	Tournament Not Held																							NR	2R	DNQ	DNQ	DNQ	DNQ
Welsh Open	LQ	1R	SF	SF	QF	2R	SF	3R	SF	2R	QF	1R	3R	QF	2R	2R	2R	1R	1R	2R	1R	1R	1R	3R	2R	2R	3R	1R	WD
Shoot-Out	Tournament Not Held																			Non-Ranking Event						A	2R	1R	A
Players Championship (Note: The event was called the Players Tour Championship Grand Finals (2010/2011–2012/2013) and the Players Championship Grand Final (2013/2014–2015/2016))	Tournament Not Held																			DNQ	DNQ	DNQ	DNQ	1R	DNQ	DNQ	DNQ	DNQ	DNQ
Gibraltar Open	Tournament Not Held																								MR	3R	1R	2R	A
Tour Championship	Tournament Not Held																											DNQ	DNQ
World Championship	QF	1R	1R	QF	F	1R	QF	1R	1R	QF	W	QF	1R	SF	F	2R	QF	1R	1R	1R	1R	1R	LQ	LQ	1R	1R	LQ	LQ	A
Non-ranking tournaments
Six-red World Championship (Note: The event was called the Six-red Snooker International (2008/2009) and the Six-red World Grand Prix (2009/2010))	Tournament Not Held																	2R	2R	2R	NH	RR	A	A	A	A	A	A	A
The Masters	LQ	LQ	QF	SF	1R	QF	1R	1R	1R	QF	QF	1R	QF	SF	QF	1R	QF	1R	QF	QF	A	A	A	A	A	A	A	A	A
Championship League	Tournament Not Held																A	RR	RR	RR	RR	RR	RR	RR	A	A	A	A	A
World Seniors Championship	A	Tournament Not Held																		1R	A	A	A	1R	1R	A	A	A	A
Former ranking tournaments
Classic	LQ	Tournament Not Held																											
Strachan Open (Note: The event was called the Strachan Challenge (1992/1993–1993/1994))	1R	MR	NR	Tournament Not Held																									
Dubai Classic (Note: The event was called the Thailand Classic (1995/1996) and the Asian Classic (1996/1997))	1R	3R	QF	F	2R	QF	Tournament Not Held																						
Malta Grand Prix	Not Held			Non-Ranking Event					1R	NR	Tournament Not Held																		
Thailand Masters (Note: The event was called the Asian Open (1991/1992–1992/1993) and the Thailand Open (1993/1994–1996/1997))	1R	1R	QF	QF	SF	W	QF	2R	1R	1R	2R	NR	Not Held			NR	Tournament Not Held												
British Open	LQ	3R	1R	3R	QF	SF	1R	QF	F	W	QF	3R	3R	2R	Tournament Not Held														
Irish Masters	Non-Ranking Event											2R	W	1R	NH	NR	Tournament Not Held												
Northern Ireland Trophy	Tournament Not Held														NR	2R	QF	2R	Tournament Not Held										
Bahrain Championship	Tournament Not Held																	1R	Tournament Not Held										
Wuxi Classic (Note: The event was called the Jiangsu Classic (2008/2009–2009/2010))	Tournament Not Held																	Non-Ranking Event				1R	1R	LQ	Tournament Not Held				
Australian Goldfields Open (Note: The event was called the Australian Open (1994/1995) and the Australian Masters (1995/1996))	Not Held			NR		Tournament Not Held															1R	F	LQ	2R	LQ	Tournament Not Held			
Shanghai Masters	Tournament Not Held																1R	1R	1R	2R	1R	1R	LQ	LQ	1R	LQ	LQ	NR	
Paul Hunter Classic (Note: The event was called the Grand Prix Fürth (2004/2005) and the Fürth German Open (2005/2006–2006/2007))	Tournament Not Held													Pro-am Event						Minor-Ranking Event						WD	3R	F	NR
Indian Open	Tournament Not Held																						1R	2R	NH	QF	LQ	2R	NH
China Open (Note: The event was called the China International (1997/1998–1998/1999))	Tournament Not Held						NR	2R	1R	2R	1R	Not Held		1R	2R	1R	2R	W	QF	QF	W	1R	3R	2R	1R	LQ	1R	2R	NH
Former non-ranking tournaments
Indian Masters	NH	RR	Tournament Not Held																										
Belgian Masters	A	1R	Not Held		A	Tournament Not Held																							
European Challenge	A	QF	Tournament Not Held																										
Tenball	Not Held			QF	Tournament Not Held																								
Malta Grand Prix	Not Held			SF	W	A	A	A	R	A	Tournament Not Held																		
Guangzhou Masters	Tournament Not Held				SF	Tournament Not Held																							
Pontins Professional	A	A	A	W	SF	A	A	A	A	Tournament Not Held																			
German Masters	Tournament Not Held				Ranking Event			1R	Tournament Not Held											Ranking Event									
Champions Cup (Note: The event was called the Charity Challenge (1994/1995–1998/1999))	Not Held			1R	SF	SF	1R	1R	A	A	SF	Tournament Not Held																	
Scottish Masters	A	A	A	A	F	W	QF	QF	LQ	A	1R	QF	Tournament Not Held																
Northern Ireland Trophy	Tournament Not Held														1R	Ranking Event			Tournament Not Held										
Irish Masters	A	A	1R	W	QF	SF	1R	SF	A	SF	F	Ranking Event			NH	A	Tournament Not Held												
Pot Black	A	A	QF	Tournament Not Held											A	SF	QF	Tournament Not Held											
European Open	Ranking Event						Tournament Not Held				Ranking Event						RR	Tournament Not Held								Ranking Event			
Hainan Classic	Tournament Not Held																			RR	Tournament Not Held								
Wuxi Classic	Tournament Not Held																	RR	RR	A	QF	Ranking Event			Tournament Not Held				
Brazil Masters	Tournament Not Held																				SF	Tournament Not Held							
Premier League (Note: The event was called the Matchroom League (1991/1992) and the European League (1992/1993–1996/1997))	A	RR	A	A	SF	SF	A	A	A	A	A	SF	A	A	A	A	A	A	A	A	A	RR	Tournament Not Held						
World Grand Prix	Tournament Not Held																							QF	Ranking Event				
Shoot-Out	Tournament Not Held																			1R	1R	1R	1R	2R	2R	Ranking Event			

Performance Table Legend
LQ	lost in the qualifying draw	#R	lost in the early rounds of the tournament (WR = Wildcard round, RR = Round robin)	QF	lost in the quarter-finals
SF	lost in the semi-finals	F	lost in the final	W	won the tournament
DNQ	did not qualify for the tournament	A	did not participate in the tournament	WD	withdrew from the tournament
DQ	disqualified from the tournament				

NH / Not Held	event was not held.
NR / Non-Ranking Event	event is/was no longer a ranking event.
R / Ranking Event	event is/was a ranking event.
MR / Minor-Ranking Event	means an event is/was a minor-ranking event.
PA / Pro-am Event	means an event is/was a pro-am event.

== Career finals ==
Below is a list of professional finals contested by Ebdon.

=== Ranking finals: 18 (9 titles) ===
Legend
World Championship (1–2)
UK Championship (1–1)
Other (7–6)

Outcome	No.	Year	Championship	Opponent in the final	Score
Winner	1.	1993	Grand Prix	(Republic of Ireland) Ken Doherty	9–6
Runner-up	1.	1994	Dubai Classic	(Scotland) Alan McManus	6–9
Runner-up	2.	1995	UK Championship	(Scotland) Stephen Hendry	3–10
Runner-up	3.	1996	European Open	(England) John Parrott	7–9
Runner-up	4.	1996	World Snooker Championship	(Scotland) Stephen Hendry	12–18
Winner	2.	1997	Thailand Open	(England) Nigel Bond	9–7
Runner-up	5.	1999	British Open	(Scotland) Stephen Hendry	5–9
Winner	3.	2000	British Open	(England) Jimmy White	9–6
Winner	4.	2001	Scottish Open	(Republic of Ireland) Ken Doherty	9–7
Runner-up	6.	2001	LG Cup	(England) Stephen Lee	4–9
Winner	5.	2002	World Snooker Championship	(Scotland) Stephen Hendry	18–17
Winner	6.	2004	Irish Masters	(England) Mark King	10–7
Runner-up	7.	2006	World Snooker Championship (2)	(Scotland) Graeme Dott	14–18
Winner	7.	2006	UK Championship	(Scotland) Stephen Hendry	10–6
Winner	8.	2009	China Open	(Scotland) John Higgins	10–8
Winner	9.	2012	China Open (2)	(Scotland) Stephen Maguire	10–9
Runner-up	8.	2012	Australian Goldfields Open	(England) Barry Hawkins	3–9
Runner-up	9.	2018	Paul Hunter Classic	(England) Kyren Wilson	2–4

=== Non-ranking finals: 8 (6 titles) ===
Outcome	No.	Year	Championship	Opponent in the final	Score
Winner	1.	1991	Finnish Masters	(England) Mike Henson	6–3
Winner	2.	1992	Finnish Masters	(England) Mark King	6–4
Winner	3.	1995	Irish Masters	(Scotland) Stephen Hendry	9–8
Winner	4.	1995	Pontins Professional	(Republic of Ireland) Ken Doherty	9–8
Runner-up	1.	1995	Scottish Masters	(Scotland) Stephen Hendry	5–9
Winner	5.	1995	Malta Grand Prix	(Scotland) John Higgins	7–4
Winner	6.	1996	Scottish Masters	(Scotland) Alan McManus	9–6
Runner-up	2.	2002	Irish Masters	(Scotland) John Higgins	3–10

=== Pro-am finals: 5 (4 titles) ===
Outcome	No.	Year	Championship	Opponent in the final	Score
Winner	1.	1989	Pontins Spring Open	(Republic of Ireland) Ken Doherty	7–4
Winner	2.	1990	Dutch Open	(England) Tony Knowles	6–4
Runner-up	1.	1995	Pontins Spring Open	(Wales) Mark Williams	4–7
Winner	3.	2015	Vienna Snooker Open	(England) Mark King	5–3
Winner	4.	2016	Vienna Snooker Open (2)	(England) Mark Davis	5–1

=== Team finals: 1 (1 title) ===
Outcome	No.	Year	Championship	Team/partner	Opponent in the final	Score
Winner	1.	1995	Lowen Sport European Pro-Am	(England) Tim Price	(England) Willie Thorne (Germany) Dieter Johns	10–6

=== Amateur finals: 1 (1 title) ===
Outcome	No.	Year	Championship	Opponent in the final	Score
Winner	1.	1990	IBSF World Under-21 Championship	(England) Oliver King	11–9
