= Drew Henry =

Scottish snooker player

Personal information
- Born: 24 November 1968 (age 57)

Sport
- Country: Scotland
- Sport: Snooker
- Professional: 1991–2008
- Highest ranking: 18 (2001/2002)
- Best ranking finish: Semi-final (x3)

Drew Henry (born 24 November 1968) is a Scottish former professional snooker player, who spent five consecutive seasons of his career in the top 32 of the rankings, peaking at No. 18.

== Career ==
As an amateur, Henry won the 1988 Scottish Amateur Championship and reached the Semi-Finals of the World Amateur Championship in the same year.

Turning professional in 1991, Henry won 51 of his first 62 career matches and rose to a ranking position of 39 within three seasons.

Spending 13 consecutive seasons within the World's top 48 players, Henry enjoyed his best form around the turn of the century, reaching three ranking event semi-finals, including the 2002 UK Championship, where he defeated Ronnie O'Sullivan 9-6 in the Quarter-Final. He was then defeated by Doherty in their sem-final match.

Henry achieved his best ranking of 18 for the 2001/2002 season, having narrowly missed a top 16 spot at the end of the season. He spent five consecutive seasons within the World's top 32 players.

Henry was also victorious in the 1991 Pontins Professional, defeating John Read in the final and won the 1995 WPBSA Minor Tour Event 6 in Beijing, defeating Mark Williams 6-5. In 2002 Henry also defeated Ali Carter 5-3 to win the Scottish Masters Qualifying Event. In 1996 Henry narrowly missed out on a place in the Masters when he lost in a deciding frame 8-9 to Brian Morgan in the Final of the Benson & Hedges Championship. He also lost to Dominic Dale in the final of the Malaysian Masters in the same year.

One of Scotland's leading players through the 1990s and 2000s, Henry also appeared at the Crucible Theatre for the World Snooker Championships on six occasions, losing a number of close matches to leading players such as Mark Williams, Ronnie O'Sullivan, Stephen Hendry and John Parrott. He made his debut at the crucible in 1994 losing 9-10 to John Parrott and his final appearance in 2005 losing by the same scoreline to Alan McManus, with his best runs being to the last 16 in 2000 and 2003.

After 17 seasons as a pro, Henry lost his professional status in 2008 after dropping out of the World's top 64 players following a poor run of results. Henry completely retired from the game and has since made no attempt to regain his professional status.

== Performance and rankings timeline ==
Tournaments	1990/ 91	1991/ 92	1992/ 93	1993/ 94	1994/ 95	1995/ 96	1996/ 97	1997/ 98	1998/ 99	1999/ 00	2000/ 01	2001/ 02	2002/ 03	2003/ 04	2004/ 05	2005/ 06	2006/ 07	2007/ 08
Rankings (Note: It shows the ranking at the beginning of the season)	(Note: He was an amateur)	(Note: New players on the Main Tour do not have a ranking)	87	64	39	35	40	40	43	45	29	18	22	25	27	35	41	57
Ranking tournaments
Shanghai Masters	Tournament Not Held																	LQ
Grand Prix (Note: The event was called the LG Cup (2001/2002-2003/2004))	A	LQ	LQ	1R	LQ	LQ	LQ	1R	2R	1R	2R	3R	1R	1R	1R	LQ	LQ	LQ
Northern Ireland Trophy	Tournament Not Held															NR	LQ	LQ
UK Championship	A	2R	LQ	3R	2R	1R	LQ	LQ	LQ	3R	QF	2R	SF	2R	1R	1R	LQ	LQ
Welsh Open	NH	LQ	1R	2R	1R	QF	1R	LQ	1R	3R	2R	LQ	LQ	2R	3R	2R	LQ	1R
China Open (Note: The event was called the China International (1997/1998-1998/1999))	Tournament Not Held							NR	1R	LQ	SF	LQ	Not Held		LQ	1R	LQ	LQ
World Championship	A	LQ	LQ	1R	LQ	1R	LQ	LQ	LQ	2R	LQ	1R	2R	LQ	1R	LQ	LQ	LQ
Non-ranking tournaments
The Masters	A	LQ	LQ	LQ	LQ	LQ	LQ	LQ	LQ	LQ	LQ	LQ	LQ	LQ	A	A	A	A
Former ranking tournaments
Classic	A	LQ	Tournament Not Held															
Strachan Open (Note: The event was called the Strachan Challenge (1992/1993-1993/1994))	NH	1R	MR	NR	Tournament Not Held													
Asian Classic (Note: The event was called the Dubai Classic (1990/1991-1994/1995) and the Thailand Classic (1995/1996))	A	LQ	LQ	LQ	LQ	LQ	LQ	Tournament Not Held										
German Open	Tournament Not Held					LQ	LQ	LQ	NR	Tournament Not Held								
Malta Grand Prix	Tournament Not Held				Non-Ranking Event					1R	NR	Tournament Not Held						
Thailand Masters (Note: The event was called the Asian Open (1990/1991-1992/1993) and the Thailand Open (1993/1994-1996/1997))	A	LQ	LQ	LQ	LQ	LQ	LQ	LQ	LQ	LQ	LQ	LQ	NR	Not Held			NR	NH
Players Championship (Note: The event was called the International Open (1992/1993-1996/1997) and the Scottish Open (1997/1998-2002/2003))	Not Held		3R	1R	2R	2R	LQ	2R	2R	1R	SF	1R	2R	3R	Tournament Not Held			
British Open	A	1R	LQ	LQ	2R	LQ	2R	1R	2R	2R	1R	2R	1R	1R	2R	Not Held		
Irish Masters	Non-Ranking Event												1R	LQ	LQ	NH	NR	NH
Malta Cup (Note: The event was called the European Open (1990/1991-1996/1997 and 2001/2002-2003/2004) and the Irish Open (1998/1999))	A	LQ	LQ	LQ	LQ	LQ	1R	NH	LQ	Not Held		LQ	LQ	1R	1R	LQ	LQ	NR
Former non-ranking tournaments
World Masters	LQ	Tournament Not Held																
Strachan Challenge	NH	R	MR	2R	Tournament Not Held													
Scottish Masters	A	A	A	A	1R	A	A	A	A	LQ	LQ	LQ	1R	Tournament Not Held				

Performance Table Legend
LQ	lost in the qualifying draw	#R	lost in the early rounds of the tournament (WR = Wildcard round, RR = Round robin)	QF	lost in the quarter-finals
SF	lost in the semi-finals	F	lost in the final	W	won the tournament
DNQ	did not qualify for the tournament	A	did not participate in the tournament	WD	withdrew from the tournament

NH / Not Held	means an event was not held.
NR / Non-Ranking Event	means an event is/was no longer a ranking event.
R / Ranking Event	means an event is/was a ranking event.
MR / Minor-Ranking Event	means an event is/was a minor-ranking event.

== Career finals ==
=== Non-ranking finals: 3 (1 titles) ===
Outcome	No.	Year	Championship	Opponent in the final	Score
Winner	1.	1995	WPBSA Minor Tour - Event 6	(Wales) Mark Williams	6–5
Runner-up	1.	1996	Malaysian Masters	(Wales) Dominic Dale	3–8
Runner-up	2.	1996	Benson & Hedges Championship	(England) Brian Morgan	8–9

=== Pro-am finals: 2 (1 title) ===
Outcome	No.	Year	Championship	Opponent in the final	Score
Runner-up	1.	1989	Pontins Autumn Open	(England) Jonathan Birch	4–5
Winner	1.	1991	Pontins Autumn Open	(England) John Read	5–2

=== Amateur Finals: 1 (1 title) ===
Outcome	No.	Year	Championship	Opponent in the final	Score
Winner	1.	1988	Scottish Amateur Championship	(Scotland) Jimmy Allan	9-8
