= Motherwell Civic Centre =

Municipal building in Motherwell, Scotland

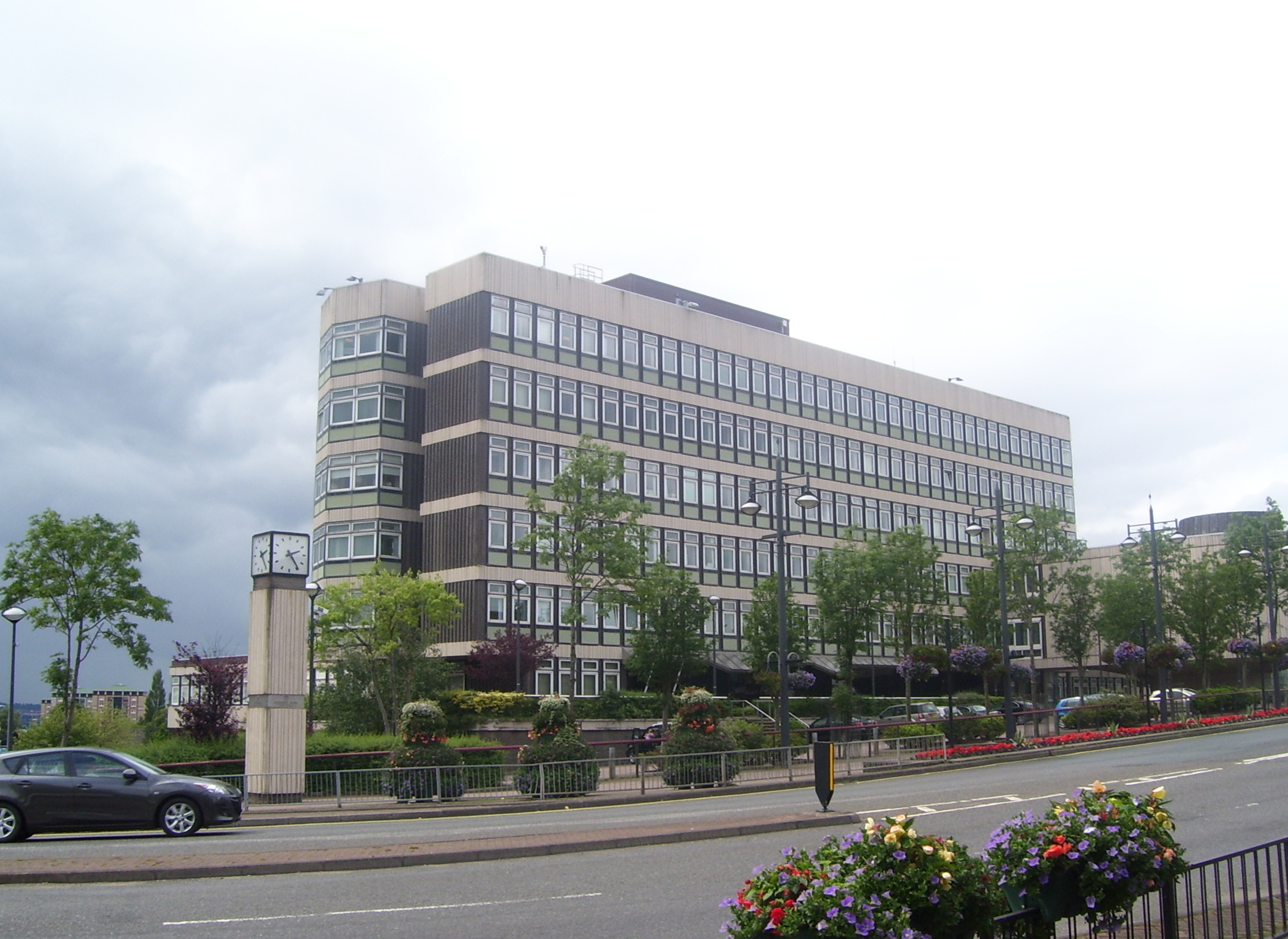
- Motherwell Civic Centre

- Shown in North Lanarkshire
- 55.7837°N 3.9825°W
- Location: Windmillhill Street, Motherwell, Scotland

History
- Built: 1970

Site notes
- Architect(s): Wylie, Shanks and Partners
- Architectural style: Brutalist style

Listed Building – Category B
- Designated: 2 December 2020
- Reference no.: LB52545

Motherwell Civic Centre is a municipal building in Windmillhill Street in Motherwell, North Lanarkshire, Scotland. The building, which is the headquarters of North Lanarkshire Council, is a Category B listed building.

== History ==
The facility was commissioned to replace the ageing Motherwell Town Hall in Hamilton Road. After a period of rapid population expansion associated with the growth of the Ravenscraig steelworks, civic leaders decided to procure a purpose-built civic centre: the site selected at the corner of Airbles Road and Windmillhill Street had previously been occupied by residential properties with a public house on the corner itself.

The foundation stone for the new building was laid by the provost, Edward McCardle, in September 1965. It was designed by Wylie, Shanks and Partners in the Brutalist style, built by Whatlings (Buildings) Limited at a cost of £2.25 million and was officially opened by the Lord Lieutenant of Lanarkshire, Lord Clydesmuir, in December 1970. The main frontage of the civic centre, facing on Windmillhill Street (today part of the A721 road), featured continuous stone facing panels above and below a continuous row of windows on six floors with a separate council chamber jutting out to the east of the main structure: the design also included a multi-purpose concert hall and theatre which was built to the west of the civic centre and was part financed by the Scottish Arts Council. The complex received a Scottish Civic Trust Award in 1973.

Following the official opening, the concert hall and theatre hosted an initial "carol pageant" and then followed this up with a regular programme of pantomimes and concerts. As well as this, top-level snooker (the Scottish Masters event) was also held within the complex during the 1990s.

The civic centre was the headquarters of the Burgh of Motherwell and Wishaw Council until it was replaced by Motherwell District Council under the wider Strathclyde Regional Council in May 1975. It remained the Motherwell District Council headquarters until the abolition of the Strathclyde Region led to the formation of North Lanarkshire Council, based at the civic centre, in April 1996. A comprehensive programme of refurbishment works to the concert hall and theatre, costing £6 million, was completed in November 2011.

The Civic Centre was designed a Category B listed building by Historic Environment Scotland in December 2020.

In December 2024, it was confirmed that the Civic Theatre and Concert hall building, which had been closed since September 2023 due to the potential risk of collapse associated with reinforced autoclaved aerated concrete in the roof, would cost at least £10 million to repair and it would be demolished instead, with a replacement planned to be built at Ravenscraig.

== See also ==
- List of city chambers and town halls in Scotland
- List of listed buildings in Motherwell And Wishaw, North Lanarkshire
- Pre-Worlds concert
