= Regal (cigarette) =

British cigarette brand

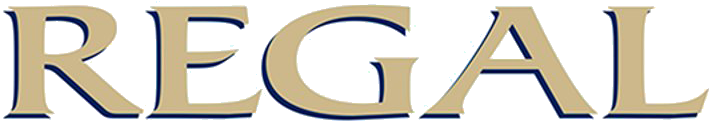
- Product type: Cigarette
- Produced by: Imperial Tobacco
- Country: United Kingdom
- Introduced: 1969; 57 years ago

Regal is a British brand of cigarettes. It is currently owned and manufactured by Imperial Tobacco.

== History ==
The coupon cigarette was originally released as Embassy Regal Filter in 1969. The brand became very popular and sold coupon cigarettes until around 1999. Classed as a "premium" brand cigarette, they are one of the most expensive cigarette products available in the United Kingdom. Regal are very popular in Scotland, Northern Ireland and in the north of England; further south Regal's sister brand Embassy is more popular. Regal is available in king size and regular filter size.

In 2014 the cigarette factory in Nottingham that produced Regal cigarettes closed and production was moved to Germany and Poland.

== "Reg" advertising campaign ==
British pack of Regal cigarettes

In the 1990s, Imperial Tobacco launched an advertising campaign featuring an everyman named Reg who offered his dad-humour insights on various subjects. The first ad read, "Reg on Smoking: I smoke 'em because my name's on 'em." As he held his fingers over the 'al' in Regal. More adverts followed, such as "Reg on train-spotting: "There's one." and "Reg on party politics: 'If you drop ash on the carpet you won't get invited again.'"

Imperial Tobacco claimed that Reg did not encourage children to smoke, as the character was viewed as "repulsive and far from cool". However, the campaign was eventually withdrawn because medical researchers discovered that the stupid humour of the ads appealed mostly to young adolescents, whereas adults 33–55 years old, who were supposedly the target group for the campaign, did not identify with Reg.

== Counterfeits ==
In April 2002, The Daily Telegraph reported that middlemen were offering supposedly duty-free Regal and Silk Cut cigarettes to consumers. These products turned out to be illegally counterfeited in Chinese factories on the border between Fujian and Guangdong provinces and were highly toxic. Alongside the health risks of smoking, the cigarettes were produced in unhygienic factory conditions and included tobacco sweepings, sawdust, dirt, banned chemicals as well as high levels of tar and nicotine. These counterfeits cost £2.5 billion in lost revenue in 2001 and were thought to account for 'at least a quarter of all the cigarettes smoked in Britain' in that year according to HM Treasury.
