= 2001 Irish Masters =

Snooker tournament

Irish Masters
Tournament information
- Dates: 27 March – 1 April 2001
- Venue: Citywest Hotel
- City: Dublin
- Country: Ireland
- Organisation: WPBSA
- Format: Non-ranking event
- Total prize fund: £175,000
- Winner's share: £75,000
- Highest break: Ronnie O'Sullivan (ENG) (137)

Final
- Champion: Ronnie O'Sullivan (ENG)
- Runner-up: Stephen Hendry (SCO)
- Score: 9–8

The 2001 Irish Masters (officially the 2001 Citywest Irish Masters) was a professional invitational snooker tournament which was held at the Citywest Hotel in Saggart, Dublin, from 27 March to 1 April. It was the 24th Irish Masters and the fifth and final World Professional Billiards and Snooker Association invitational event in the 2000–01 snooker season. The tournament was co-sponsored by the Health Promotion Unit and the Office of Tobacco Control of the Department of Health and Children and hotel group Citywest.

John Higgins was the defending champion of the tournament but was eliminated in the quarter-finals following a defeat by Peter Ebdon. Ronnie O'Sullivan, three-time tournament winner over the course of the season, won the competition, beating three-time Irish Masters winner Stephen Hendry nine frames to eight (9–8) in the final. In the semi-finals, O'Sullivan defeated Ebdon and Hendry beat defending world champion Mark Williams. O'Sullivan made a century break of 137 in the second frame of his quarter-final match with six-time world champion Steve Davis, the highest of the tournament.

== Overview ==
Founded in 1978 by the Benson & Hedges tobacco brand as the Republic of Ireland's major snooker event, the Irish Masters originated as a snooker challenge match before it became an elimination tournament. The 2001 competition was its 24th staging, and the last of the five World Professional Billiards and Snooker Association invitational events in the 2000–01 snooker season. It featured a 12-player draw that occurred at the Citywest Hotel, Saggart, Dublin, between 27 March and 1 April 2001. The tournament was co-sponsored by the Health Promotion Unit and the Office of Tobacco Control of the Department of Health and Children and hotel group Citywest following the withdrawal of Benson & Hedges as a title sponsor, as a result of Micheál Martin, the Irish Health Minister, introducing a ban on tobacco advertising and sponsorship in Ireland in September 2000.

A total of £195,000 prize money was available, with £75,000 going to the winner, and the host broadcaster was RTÉ. The competition went ahead as scheduled in the wake of concerns about the spread of foot-and-mouth in Ireland and the United Kingdom. The eight highest-ranked players in the world rankings and four wild cards were invited to play in Ireland. Each of the 12 players were seeded, with the first seed being John Higgins, the competition's defending winner. The maximum number of frames played in a match increased from 11 in the first round, the quarter-finals and the semi-finals to the best-of-17 frames final on 1 April.

== Tournament summary ==
=== First round ===
The first round was played from 27 to 28 March and entailed four best-of-11-frame fixtures. Jimmy White, the 2000 British Open finalist, lost 6–4 to world number six Alan McManus in a 3-hour, 7-minute match. McManus won the first four of the first six frames to lead 4–2, making a century break of 102 in frame four. He went on to claim another two frames to earn the first quarter-final spot and achieve his second victory in Ireland since reaching the final of the 1994 Irish Masters. (Note: McManus' other victory in Ireland was a defeat of O'Brien at the 2000 Irish Masters.) Matthew Stevens, the world number four, defeated local player Fergal O'Brien 6–2. Both players shared the first four frames into the mid-session break before Stevens claimed four frames in a row with breaks of 61 and 59, following playing errors from O'Brien to win.

The third game was between six-time world champion and eight-time Irish Masters winner Steve Davis and Welsh Open and Thailand Masters champion Ken Doherty. After three frames, Davis came from 2–1 behind to lead 5–3 on breaks of 45, 42, 74, 61 and 65. Doherty won the ninth frame 88–0 but Davis won the match 6–4 after 35 minutes of tactical play in frame ten. It was the 19th time Davis had qualified for the quarter-finals of the Irish Masters, his first ranking win since November 2000 and Doherty's first loss to Davis in five matches. 1995 Irish Masters winner Peter Ebdon played the final first round match with world number five Stephen Lee. The first two frames were won by Lee on breaks of 90 and 65. Ebdon came from 2–0 behind with breaks of 57, 57, 58, 94, 69 and 124 to defeat Lee 6–4 and be the last to qualify for the quarter-finals.

=== Quarter-finals ===
All four quarter-finals were played between 29 and 30 March. The first quarter-final was between three-time Irish Masters champion Stephen Hendry and fellow Scot McManus. Hendry took 50 minutes to take a 4–0 lead as McManus scored 21 points in this period. McManus won the fifth frame with a break of 51 to prevent a whitewash before Hendry took the next two frames in 23 minutes to win 6–1. Hendry qualified for the semi-finals for the eighth time in the season and beat McManus for the 19th time. Hendry outscored McManus 557 points to 94 and amassed 358 points without reply as the latter failed to pot a ball in five frames. Mark Williams, the 2000 World Snooker Championship winner, faced fellow Welsh player Stevens in the second quarter-final in a rematch of the world final. The two shared the first six frames before Williams won frames seven and eight to lead. Stevens won frame nine with a break of 120 but Williams won the game 6–4 in the tenth frame by a score of 79–1.

The third quarter-final was between British Open champion Ebdon and 2000 UK Championship winner Higgins. Ebdon won the first three frames with breaks of 63, 68 and 90 for a 3–0 lead before Higgins made breaks of 66 and 53 as he secured three of the next four frames to go 4–3 behind. Ebdon clinched the next two frames as he won the game 6–3. The last quarter-final was played by Davis and three-time 2000–01 tournament winner Ronnie O'Sullivan. In the first frame, O'Sullivan looked set to achieve a maximum break before a spectator's ringing mobile phone distracted him while on 72 points. He went on to win five of the next eight frames including a 137 total clearance and a break of 136 to defeat Davis 6–3 for the last semi-final spot. Of the mobile phone incident, O'Sullivan said: "It didn't put me off though it was an important shot I was playing. These things are happening more and more, there is no difference these days between carrying a mobile and having money in your pocket. Some people have panic attacks if they forget their mobile."

=== Semi-finals ===
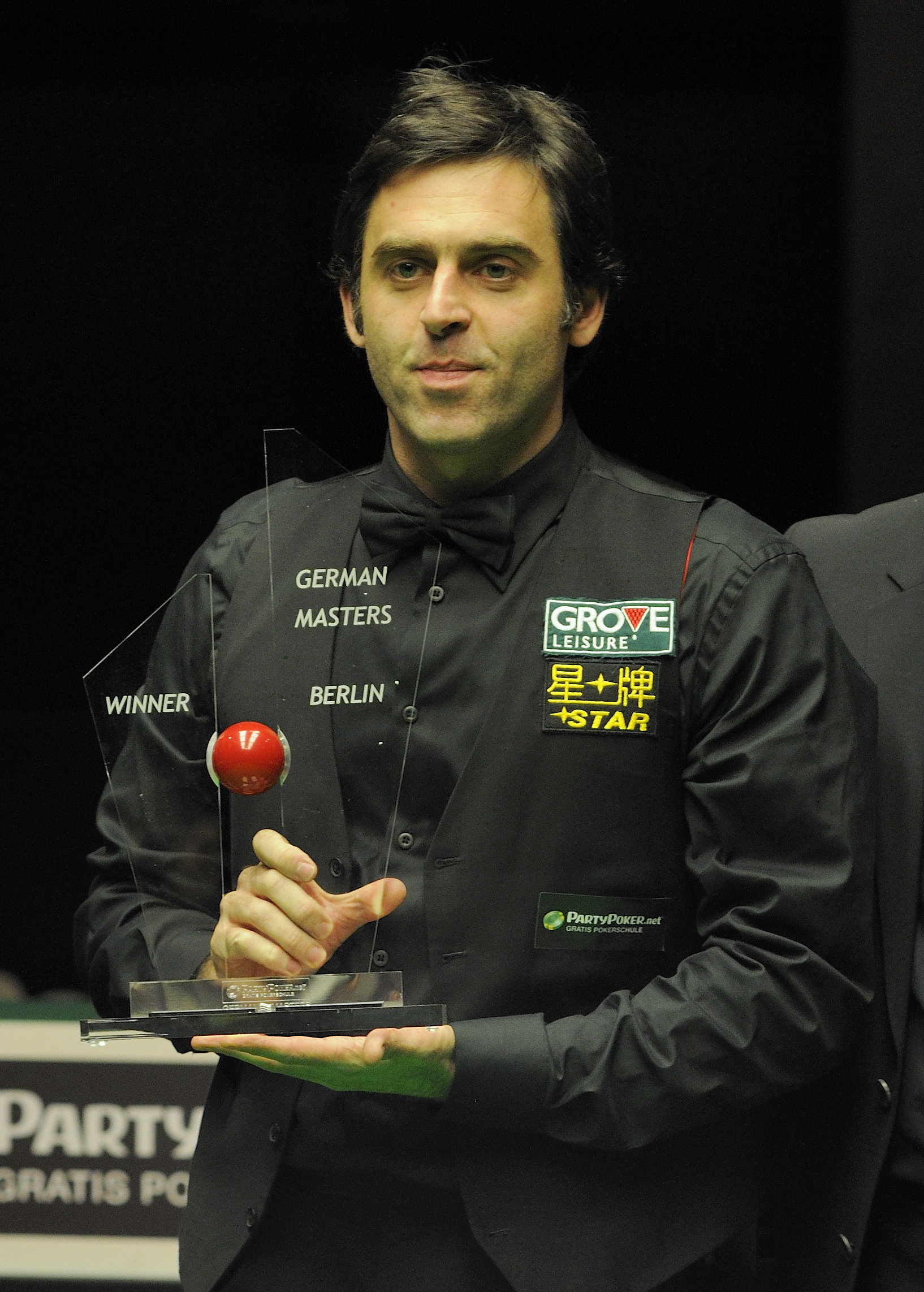
Ronnie O'Sullivan (pictured in 2012) won the Irish Masters for the first time, defeating Stephen Hendry 9–8 in the final.

Both of the semi-finals took place on 31 March. The first semi-final was played between Hendry and Williams. Hendry took 51 minutes to win four of the first five frames with century breaks of 100 and 113, bringing his number of professional centuries to 531. Williams then took frames six and seven to go 4–3 behind. Hendry won two more frames to qualify for the final by a score of 6–3. It was the 96th final of his professional career, and his seventh Irish Masters final. Also, it was his second recent victory over Williams, whom he had defeated in the 2001 Malta Grand Prix. Hendry commented on his and Williams' play: "Mark missed a lot of shots. I don't expect to get quite so many chances whoever I play in the final. I don't think I played as well as I did in the quarter-finals and Mark can certainly play better than he did. He had an off day and I didn't."

The other semi-final was between Ebdon and O'Sullivan. The first five frames were won by O'Sullivan with breaks of 67, 53, 87, 130 and 134 before Ebdon claimed the next three with breaks of 93, 124 and 83. O'Sullivan prevented Ebdon from scoring in the ninth frame to win the match 6–3, clinching the second spot in the final. O'Sullivan praised Ebdon for "forcing [him] to do well" and commented on his own form: "I don't feel 100 per cent about my game which is my problem when things go wrong but at least I am hitting top form here. I've been trying to get something extra out of my game and sometimes it is paying off. But I still go for shots that perhaps would be better left alone. I should hold back but I can't always do that."

=== Final ===
The best-of-17 frames final between Hendry and O'Sullivan was held over two sessions on 1 April. It was the 30th time the two players had met in professional competition; O'Sullivan had won their 15 previous meetings, while Hendry had won the other 14. On a break of 41, Hendry missed the final red ball while using the rest, allowing O'Sullivan to make a 28 clearance to the pink ball and win the opening frame. O'Sullivan took 20 minutes to accumulate 136 points from breaks of 60 and 76 as he won the next three frames to go 4–0 ahead before the mid-session interval. Hendry won the fifth frame with an eight-minute break of 76, and O'Sullivan took the sixth in less than ten minutes on a break of 86. The first session ended 5–2 to O'Sullivan when Hendry won frame seven on a break of 76. After a four-hour interval, a break of 84 gave Hendry frame eight and O'Sullivan took the ninth on an 76 break. Breaks of 82, 95 and 53 in the next three frames allowed Hendry to equalise but O'Sullivan retook the lead with a century break of 112, his fifth of the tournament. Although Hendry won two more frames to take the lead, O'Sullivan won frame 16 on a break of 80 to force a final frame decider. O'Sullivan won the final frame for a 9–8 victory with a break of 43 after Hendry missed the black ball while on a break of 13.

It was O'Sullivan's first Irish Masters win; he had defeated Doherty 9–3 in the 1998 final but was disqualified, as he tested positive for traces of cannabis. He won his fourth tournament of the season following the Champions Cup, the Scottish Masters and the China Open, though this was his first in 2001. The £75,000 he won increased his season's earnings to more than £370,000. O'Sullivan commented on the victory: "It's a great feeling to win and right now I'm on cloud nine. It's tough on Stephen but he has won so many more titles than I have." He added: "I played good match snooker against Stephen but I wasn't flying as well as I can do. I like to win by forcing the pace, creating openings and putting my opponents under pressure. I didn't do that, I just did a job. No one remembers who finishes second and I didn't want to be on the wrong end of a 9–8 scoreline." Hendry had lost in his second successive final after losing to Doherty in the Thailand Masters and it was the third time he had been defeated in the Irish Masters final decided in the final frame. He said: "I don't get any satisfaction from finishing runner-up .... If you don't win the title it's just like losing in the first round."

== Main draw ==
Numbers given to the left of players' names show the seedings for all the players in the tournament. Players in bold denote match winners.

Round 1 Best of 11 frames
17	**Steve Davis** (ENG)	**6**
7	Ken Doherty (IRL)	4
12	**Peter Ebdon** (ENG)	**6**
5	Stephen Lee (ENG)	4
8	**Alan McManus** (SCO)	**6**
18	Jimmy White (ENG)	4
6	**Matthew Stevens** (WAL)	**6**
9	Fergal O'Brien (IRL)	2

Quarter-finals; Best of 11 frames
4	(England) **Ronnie O'Sullivan**	**6**
17	(England) Steve Davis	3
12	(England) **Peter Ebdon**	**6**
1	(Scotland) John Higgins	3
3	(Scotland) **Stephen Hendry**	**6**
8	(Scotland) Alan McManus	1
2	(Wales) **Mark Williams**	**6**
6	(Wales) Matthew Stevens	4

Semi-finals; Best of 11 frames
4	(England) **Ronnie O'Sullivan**	**6**
12	(England) Peter Ebdon	3
3	(Scotland) **Stephen Hendry**	**6**
2	(Wales) Mark Williams	3

Final; Best of 17 frames
4	(England) **Ronnie O'Sullivan**	**9**
3	(Scotland) Stephen Hendry	8

=== Final ===
The bold text in the table indicate winning frame scores and denotes the player who won the game. Breaks over 50 are displayed in brackets.

Final: Best of 17 frames. Citywest Hotel, Dublin, Republic of Ireland, 1 April 2001.
Stephen Hendry (3); Scotland	8–**9**	**Ronnie O'Sullivan** (4); England
Afternoon: 57–**69**, 5–**83**, 28–**99** (60), 0–**76** (76), **76**–6 (76), 11–**87** (87), **76**–0 (76); Evening: **109**–1 (84), 31–**76** (76), **86**–0 (82), **99**–25 (95), **83**–26 (53), 9–**112** (112), **62**–44, **74**–1 (74), 0–**86** (80), 13–**71**
95	Highest break	**112**
0	Century breaks	**1**
**7**	50+ breaks	6

== Century break ==
A total of twelve century breaks were made by five different players during the Irish Masters. The highest was a 137 made by O'Sullivan in frame two of the quarter-final match with Davis.

- 137, 136, 134, 130, 112 – Ronnie O'Sullivan
- 124, 124, – Peter Ebdon
- 120, 105 – Matthew Stevens
- 113, 100 – Stephen Hendry
- 102 – Alan McManus
