= 2001 Champions Cup =

Tournament information
- Dates: 11–19 August 2001
- Venue: Brighton Centre
- City: Brighton
- Country: England
- Organisation: WPBSA
- Format: Non-ranking event
- Total prize fund: £200,000
- Winner's share: £100,000
- Highest break: Peter Ebdon (ENG) (130)

Final
- Champion: John Higgins (SCO)
- Runner-up: Mark Williams (WAL)
- Score: 7–4

The 2001 Champions Cup was a professional invitational snooker tournament held at the Brighton Centre in Brighton, England, from 11 to 19 August. It was the seventh and final edition of the eight-player Champions Cup, and was the first of four World Professional Billiards and Snooker Association (WPBSA) invitational events of the 2001–02 season following the 2001 World Snooker Championship. It preceded the season's second invitational tournament, the 2001 Scottish Masters.

John Higgins, the world number three, won the tournament, defeating two-time Champions Cup runner-up Mark Williams seven frames to four (7–4) in the final. It was the first and only Champions Cup success in the career of Higgins. In the semi-finals, Higgins defeated Ken Doherty, the 1997 world champion, 5–2 and Williams won against the 2001 Scottish Open victor Peter Ebdon by the same scoreline. Ebdon made the highest break of 130 in the third frame of his group match over Ronnie O'Sullivan, the 2001 world champion.

== Background ==
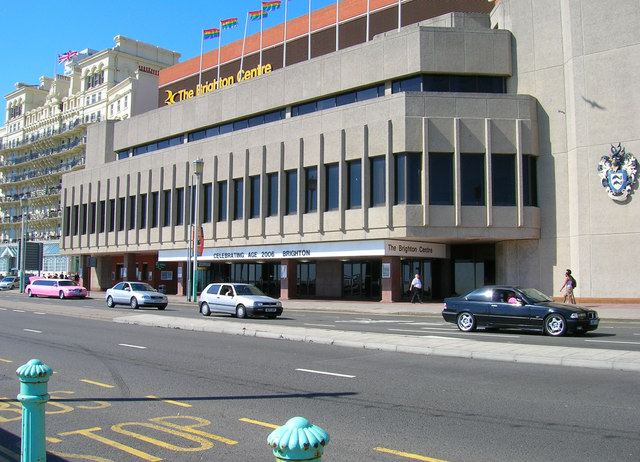
The Brighton Centre, where the tournament was held

The tournament was created as the Charity Challenge in 1995 in which players competed for charity and prize monies donated to their respective causes. The charity aspect was discarded after five years and the tournament was re-branded the Champions Cup with a new "winner takes all" format of players who had won major tournaments from the season prior invited to compete. The 2001 Champions Cup was the first of four World Professional Billiards and Snooker Association (WPBSA) invitational events of the 2001–02 season and was held at the Brighton Centre in Brighton, England, from 11 to 19 August 2001. The tournament preceded the 2001 Scottish Masters. This was the final year the tournament was played due to a lack of sponsorship and television coverage. The Champions Cup had a prize fund of £200,000, with £100,000 going to the winner, and was broadcast in the United Kingdom on ITV.

=== Rules ===
A total of eight players competed in the Champions Cup: five ranking competition winners from the 2000–01 season and three wildcards. The group stage matches played between 11 and 16 August were part of a round-robin format and were best-of-nine frames. They were drawn into two groups of four with a match played against the other three in their group. The winner of both groups was determined by the number of matches won. In the event of a draw, the number of frames won decided the group winner. If this method was ineffective in determining the group winner, a match between the tied players would occur. The winner of each group was drawn to play the runner-up of the opposite group in the semi-finals from 17 to 18 August. The final on 19 August was played to the best-of-13 frames.

== Group stages ==
=== Group A ===
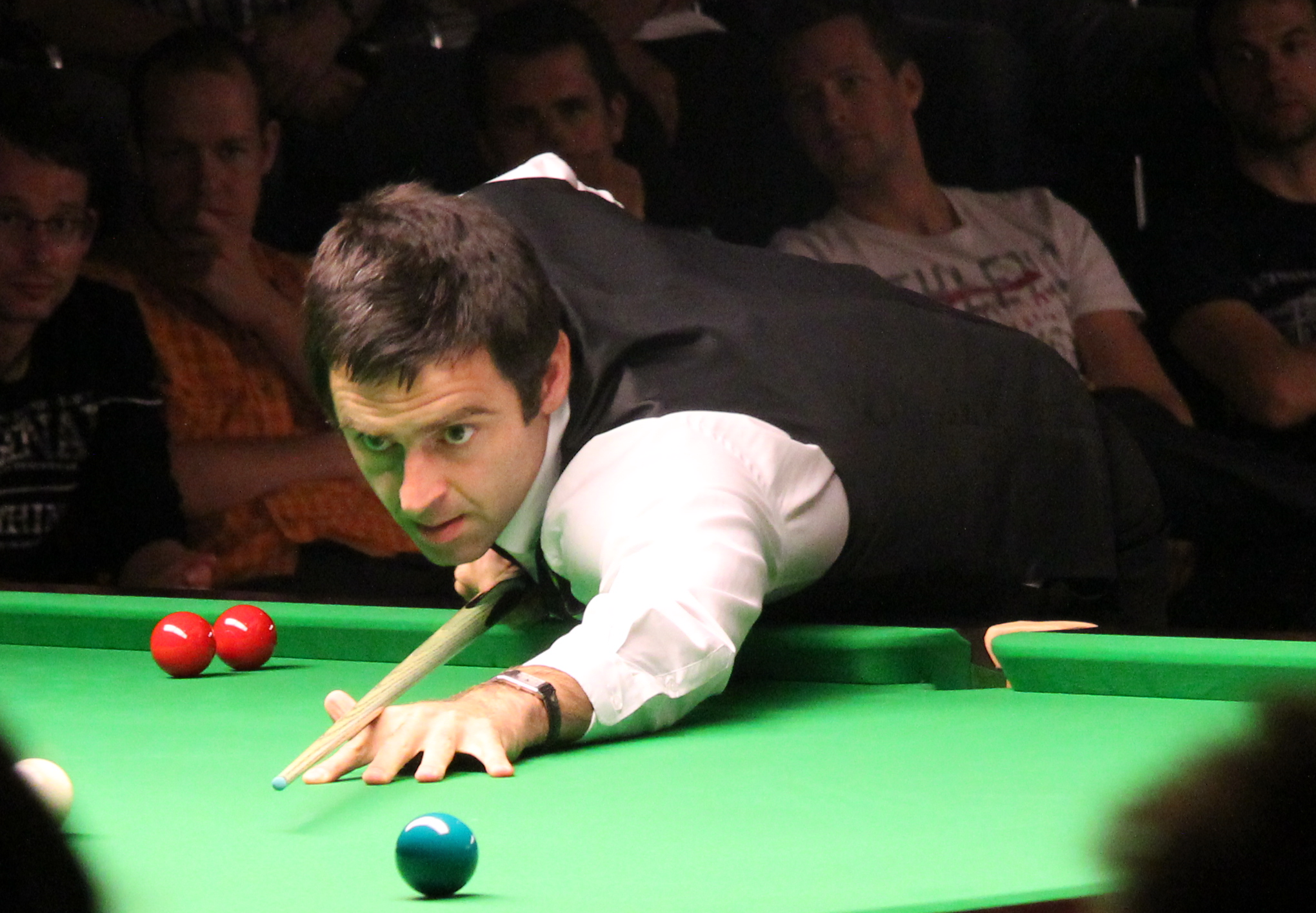
Ronnie O'Sullivan (pictured in 2011) was eliminated from the tournament in the group stages.

The opening match of the tournament saw Ronnie O'Sullivan, the 2001 world champion, play the world number 11 Jimmy White. O'Sullivan took a 3–0 lead in 53 minutes before White won the fourth frame with a clearance to the pink ball when O'Sullivan failed to pot the yellow ball into the bottom right-hand pocket. White came from 56–0 behind in frame five to win it with a 66 clearance and then breaks of 38 and 47 equalled the score at 3–3. The match ended 5–3 for O'Sullivan with a break of 93 in frame eight. Ken Doherty, the 1997 world champion and two-time ranking winner in the 2000–01 season, compiled breaks of 84 and 50 to defeat the 2001 Scottish Open champion Peter Ebdon, who made a 100 clearance and a 78 break, 5–2. He later took the group lead when he compiled a 45 clearance and 30 and 59 breaks in a 5–4 win over O'Sullivan after trailing 3–1 and 4–3. It was O'Sullivan's first defeat since he lost to Mark Davis five months prior.

Ebdon beat White 5–3 to eliminate the latter from the competition. Breaks of 112 and 93 and a fluke on the pink in frame three provided White with a 3–2 advantage. Ebdon took the lead from a 70 break. He won the eighth on the pink and claimed victory on the blue after White made an error. Ebdon made a total clearance of 130 and obtained two snookers to defeat O'Sullivan and eliminate his opponent from the tournament, saying afterwards: "On a number of occasions fortune smiled on me, and that's something you need against a top player like Ronnie." Breaks of 70, 118, 70 and 74 in 64 minutes allowed Doherty to maintain his 100 per cent win record at the event with a 5–1 victory against White.

=== Group B ===
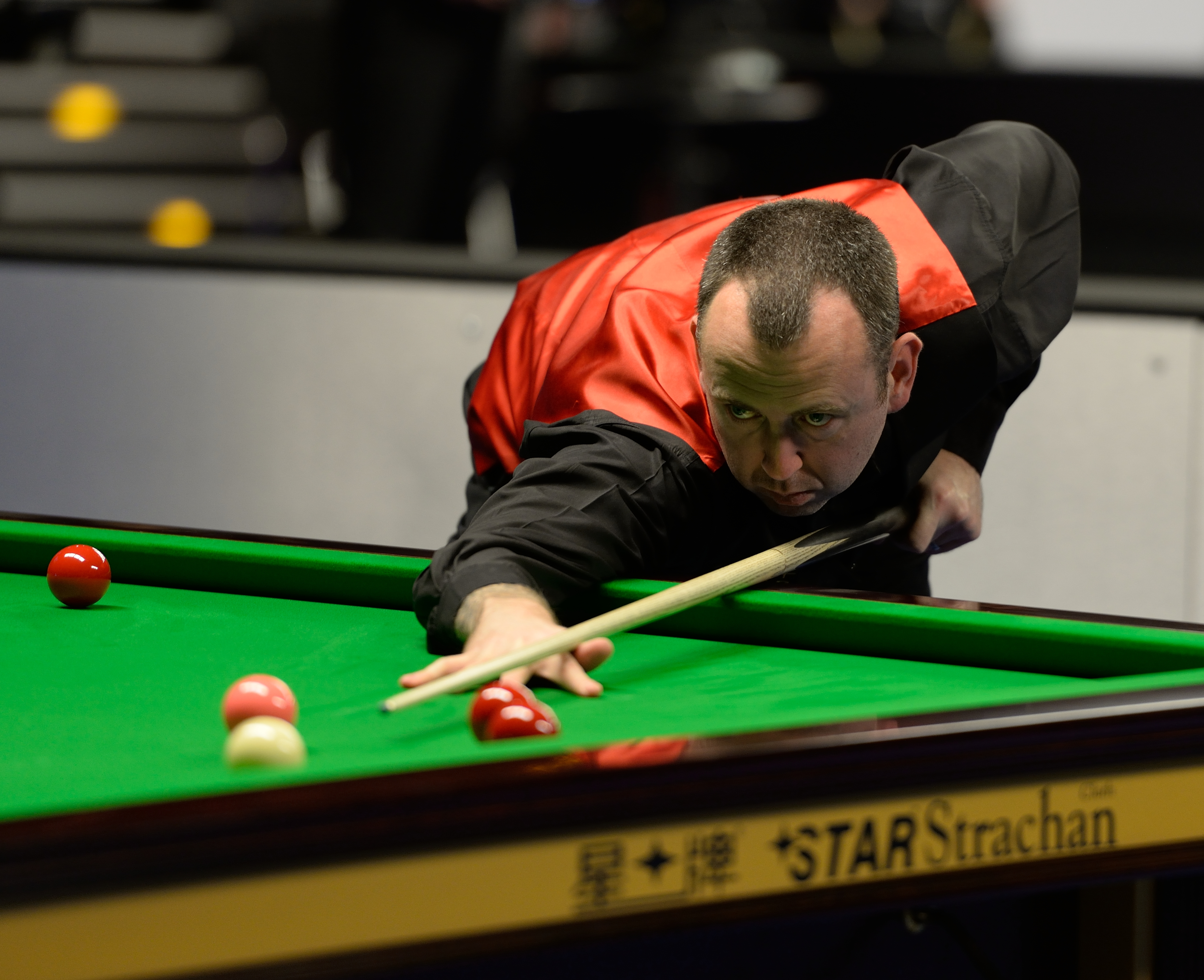
Mark Williams (pictured in 2015) advanced from Group B to the semi-finals.

World number three John Higgins won 5–4 over two-time Champions Cup runner-up Mark Williams. Higgins led 3–0 until Williams tied him 3–3; the former missed a straightforward black for a 5–3 victory. Williams won frame eight on the pink but was unable to convert a 36–0 score into a win. Higgins said the result was possibly due to nervousness. Tournament debutant Paul Hunter won 5–4 over the 1999 Champions Cup winner Stephen Hendry to requite a loss to Hendry at the 2001 world championship. Hendry failed to take a 3–2 lead because he missed the black while 66–0 in front and Hunter took frame five with a 70 clearance. Hunter claimed two of the next three frames to win. After breaks of 53, 52 and 72, Hendry lost for the second time in a row when match-long leader Williams defeated him 5–3 from two half-centuries. The result required Hendry to win his game against fellow Scot Higgins to qualify for the semi-finals.

Higgins qualified for the semi-finals with a 5–3 win over Hunter. A 97 break won Hunter frame one before Higgins took the next two with breaks of 68 and 71 to accumulate 189 points without reply. Higgins took a 4–2 lead from breaks of 64 and 50, to which Hunter made a 95 break before Higgins sealed the win on a 74–43 scoreline. Williams defeated Hunter for the sixth straight time by 5–2. The first two frames were shared before Williams took the next two. Hunter took frame six with a 33 clearance and Williams the next two to advance to the semi-finals. Breaks of 92, 79, 98 and 56 allowed Hendry to defeat Higgins 5–4 and avoid finishing last in Group B. Higgins said he would attempt to play "110 per cent harder next time out" and was relieved to play Doherty the following day.

== Knockout stages ==
=== Semi-finals ===
Both of the semi-finals were held to the best-of-nine frames on 17 to 18 August. The first semi-final saw Higgins play Doherty. Higgins won the first frame with an 80 break; he was unable to complete a maximum break after he failed to pot the black into a centre pocket. A reply break of 54 from Doherty in frame two was followed by breaks of 56 and 57 from Higgins in the next frame. Higgins won the fourth frame with a 59 clearance after coming from a 32–9 deficit. He opened up a 4–1 advantage without making any major errors, before Doherty took frame six after Higgins missed the pink into the top left-hand pocket. Doherty made a 43 break in the eighth frame before he potted an incorrect ball and allowed Higgins to produce a 48 clearance to the brown ball for a 5–2 win. Higgins said he was happy to reach the final; Doherty said he was not too unsatisfied in defeat because of his form during the competition.

The other semi-final was between Williams and Ebdon. Breaks of 61 and 104 in 43 minutes gave Williams a 3–0 lead; Ebdon was required to concede the third frame with one red on the table. Ebdon avoided a whitewash by winning the fourth frame on a re-spotted black to the top right-hand pocket. Two breaks of 30 won Ebdon frame five before Williams took a 5–2 victory from breaks of 52 and 63. It was the third consecutive year that Williams had made the final of the Champions Cup and his 14th in any tournament in the last 25 months. Williams said he would like to win the tournament and was aware of his record in the finals: "I'm a bit cheesed off by it all. However as long as I play OK, I'm happy with that." Ebdon praised Williams' form and said he had not taken chances: "Winning the fourth frame on the black gave me a chance but it proved academic in the end."

=== Final ===
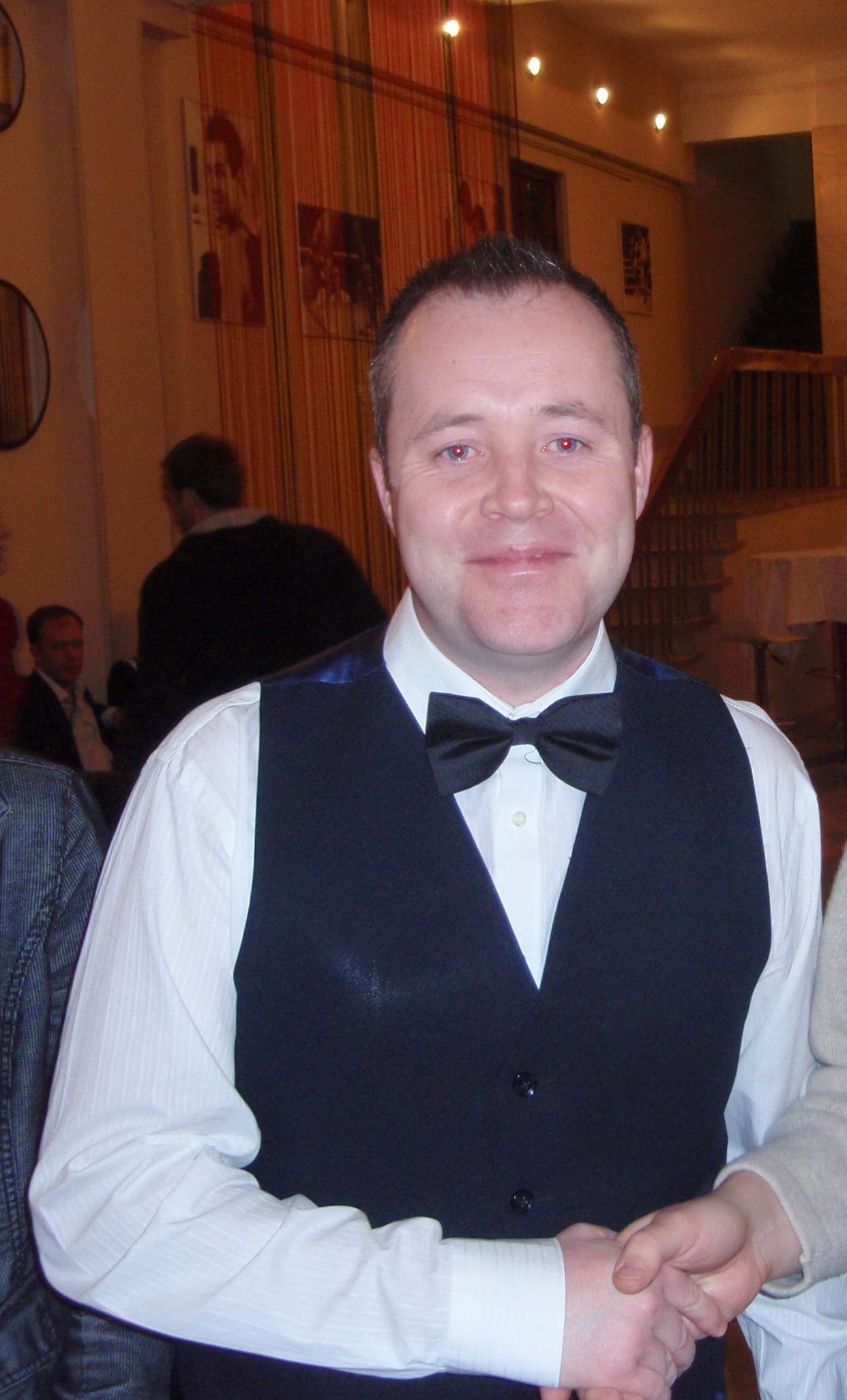
John Higgins (pictured in 2008) won his first and only Champions Cup.

The best-of-13 frames final between Higgins and Williams was played on 19 August. A century break of 100 and a clearance of 41 to the blue gave Williams a 2–0 lead after Higgins missed a safety shot. After Williams missed the black in frame three, Higgins made a 75 break and won the fourth when Williams went in-off on the last red and the yellow while on a break of 56. Williams then restored a two-frame lead in the sixth after breaks of 124 and 34. Midway in frame seven, Williams failed to pot the black from its position and Higgins was able to claim the frame. Clearances of 109 in frame eight and a 67 to the pink in the ninth gave Higgins the lead. In the tenth frame, a 69 break from Williams ended with five reds left on the table. Higgins required a snooker and obtained it to achieve a 35 clearance from the final red to the pink to go two frames ahead. Williams could not get out of a snooker from behind the yellow during frame 11. This allowed Higgins to make a clearance from the yellow to the pink and claim a 7–4 victory for the tournament.

It was Higgins' first Champions Cup title, and his 21st in professional play. The result meant Williams had lost in the final of the tournament for the third year in a row; he had lost 7–5 to Hendry in the 1999 final and by the same scoreline to O'Sullivan one year later. Higgins earned £100,000 for winning the tournament. He said of his victory: "It was a cracking match and it's a great way to start the season. I'm delighted with the way I played and even when I was bang under pressure I managed to hold myself together really well." He added that he was able to win due to his clearance, and had the opinion there were several high-quality players who could challenge over time. Williams said he was disappointed with the result: "I tried my guts out to win and blew it. This is the most sick I've felt after losing a match for five or six years." He noted that he had a potential 5–2 lead and praised Higgins' play: "It was meant to be his day."

== Results ==
The players highlighted in bold text in the table indicate who progressed to the semi-finals. Players in bold to the right of the tables denote match winners.

=== Group A ===
Group A final table
| SE | POS | Player | MP | MW | FW | FL | FD | PTS |
|---|---|---|---|---|---|---|---|---|
| 4 | 1 | **Ken Doherty (IRL)** | 3 | 3 | 15 | 7 | +8 | 3 |
| 5 | 2 | **Peter Ebdon (ENG)** | 3 | 2 | 12 | 9 | +3 | 2 |
| 1 | 3 | Ronnie O'Sullivan (ENG) | 3 | 1 | 10 | 13 | −3 | 1 |
| 8 | 4 | Jimmy White (ENG) | 3 | 0 | 7 | 15 | −8 | 0 |

- (Republic of Ireland) **Ken Doherty 5**–2 Peter Ebdon (England)
- (England) **Ronnie O'Sullivan 5**–3 Jimmy White (England)
- (England) **Peter Ebdon 5**–3 Jimmy White (England)
- (Republic of Ireland) **Ken Doherty 5**–4 Ronnie O'Sullivan (England)
- (Republic of Ireland) **Ken Doherty 5**–1 Jimmy White (England)
- (England) **Peter Ebdon 5**–1 Ronnie O'Sullivan (England)

=== Group B ===
Group B final table
| SE | POS | Player | MP | MW | FW | FL | FD | PTS |
|---|---|---|---|---|---|---|---|---|
| 2 | 1 | **Mark Williams** (WAL) | 3 | 2 | 14 | 10 | +4 | 2 |
| 3 | 2 | **John Higgins** (SCO) | 3 | 2 | 14 | 12 | +2 | 2 |
| 6 | 3 | Stephen Hendry (SCO) | 3 | 1 | 11 | 14 | −3 | 1 |
| 7 | 4 | Paul Hunter (ENG) | 3 | 1 | 10 | 13 | −3 | 1 |

- (Wales) **Mark Williams 5**–2 Paul Hunter (England)
- (Scotland) **Stephen Hendry 5**–4 John Higgins (Scotland)
- (England) **Paul Hunter 5**–3 Stephen Hendry (Scotland)
- (Scotland) **John Higgins 5**–4 Mark Williams (Wales)
- (Scotland) **John Higgins 5**–3 Paul Hunter (England)
- (Wales) **Mark Williams 5**–3 Stephen Hendry (Scotland)

=== Knockout draw ===
Numbers to the left of the players' name are the tournament seedings. Players in bold indicate match winners.

Semi-finals; Best of 9 frames
4 | (Republic of Ireland) Ken Doherty | 2
3 | (Scotland) **John Higgins** | **5**
2 | (Wales) **Mark Williams** | **5**
5 | (England) Peter Ebdon | 2

Final; Best of 13 frames
3 | (Scotland) **John Higgins** | **7**
2 | (Wales) Mark Williams | 4

=== Final ===
Scores in bold denote each of the winning frame scores and the winning player. Breaks over 50 are displayed in brackets.

Final: Best of 13 frames Brighton Centre, Brighton, England, 19 August 2001
| **John Higgins** (3); Scotland | **7**–4 | Mark Williams (2); Wales |
0–**100** (**100**), 22–**71** (41), **75**–5 (**75**), **65**–33, 0–**124** (**124**), 55–**72** (34, 40), **80**–47 (47), **127**–0 (**109**), **71**–56 (**67**), **70**–69 (69, 35), **65**–37
| 109 | Highest break | **124** |
| 1 | Century breaks | **2** |
| 3 | 50+ breaks | **4** |

== Century breaks ==
The 2001 Champions Cup featured a total of eight century breaks. The highest break of 130 was recorded by Peter Ebdon in the third frame of his Group A match against Ronnie O'Sullivan, which earned him £5,000 prize money.

- 130, 100 – Peter Ebdon
- 124, 104, 100 – Mark Williams
- 118 – Ken Doherty
- 112 – Jimmy White
- 109 – John Higgins
