= Mark Williams (snooker player) =

Welsh snooker player (born 1975)

Mark Williams MBE
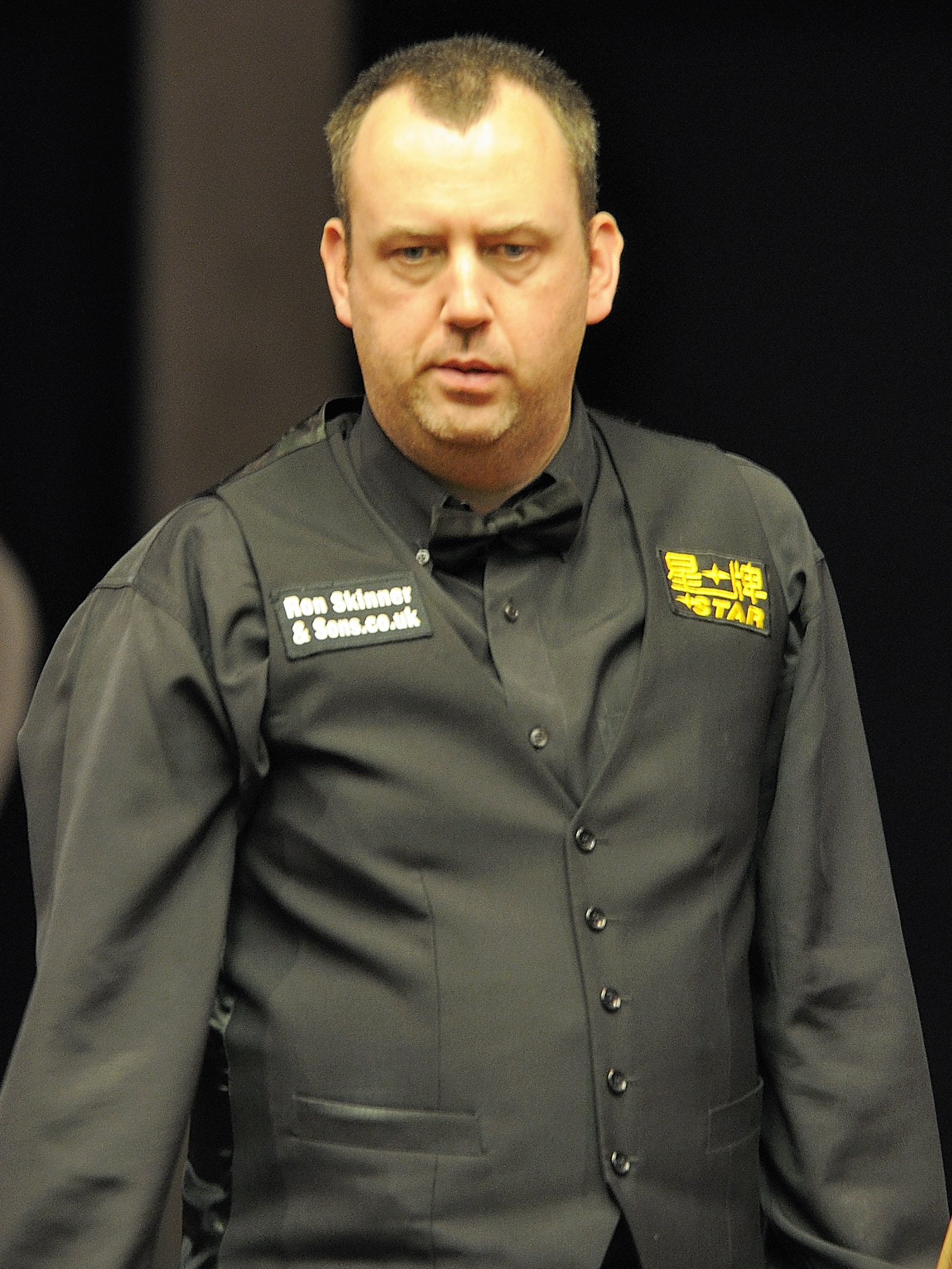
- Williams in 2014

Personal information
- Nickname: The Welsh Potting Machine
- Born: 21 March 1975 (age 51) Cwm, Gwent, Wales

Sport
- Country: Wales
- Sport: Snooker
- Professional: 1992–present
- Highest ranking: 1 (May 2000 – May 2002, May 2003 – May 2004, May–September 2011)
- Current ranking: 9 (as of 7 November 2026)
- Maximum breaks: 3
- Century breaks: 710 (as of 19 November 2026)

Tournament wins
- Ranking: 27
- Minor-ranking: 2
- World Championship: 2000; 2003; 2018

Mark James Williams (born 21 March 1975) is a Welsh professional snooker player. He has won 27 ranking titles, placing him sixth on the all-time list. He has won three World Championships, two UK Championships, and two Masters for a total of seven Triple Crown titles. He has been ranked world number one on three occasions.

Williams turned professional in the 1992–93 season, as did Ronnie O'Sullivan and John Higgins; the three players are collectively known as the "Class of '92". He won the Masters in 1998 and the UK Championship in 1999, and in 2000 became the first left-handed player to win the world title. In 2002–03, the most successful season of his career, he won the UK Championship, the Masters and the World Championship, becoming the third player, after Steve Davis and Stephen Hendry, to win all three Triple Crown events in one season. His form then declined, and he dropped out of the elite top 16 after the 2007–08 season, although he regained his place for 2009–10. After winning the 2011 German Masters, he went more than six years without a ranking title, until he won the 2017 Northern Ireland Open. In the same season, one of the best of his career, he also won the 2018 German Masters and a third world title at the 2018 World Championship.

Williams has made more than 700 century breaks in professional competition, including three maximum breaks. At the 2025 World Championship, he became the oldest world finalist at the age of 50. Later that year, he won the 2025 Xi'an Grand Prix at the age of 50 years and 206 days, breaking Ray Reardon's 43-year-old record as the oldest winner of a ranking event. Williams also became the first player to win professional titles in his teens, 20s, 30s, 40s and 50s. He was appointed MBE in the 2004 Birthday Honours and was inducted into the World Snooker Tour Hall of Fame in 2012.

== Career ==
=== Early career ===
Williams was born in Cwm, near Ebbw Vale, in the Welsh county of Gwent (now the county borough of Blaenau Gwent). He started playing snooker at an early age and won his first junior event when he was eleven years old; it was then that he decided to pursue a career as a snooker player. He scored his first century break when he was thirteen and had achieved his first maximum break by the time he was eighteen. As a schoolboy, he was also an amateur boxer but gave it up after being defeated. His father was a coal miner, and as a teenager, Williams did a 12-hour shift down a mine.

In January 1991, Williams reached the final of the junior event at the World Masters but lost 1–6 to John Higgins. Later that year, he defeated Higgins 4–0 to win the British Under-16 title. Williams was one of 173 players who all turned professional in 1992. He finished his first season ranked 119th out of 595 professional players; the rankings were based on results over two seasons, and Williams was one of only four first-season professionals to be ranked within the top 128. Three years later, he had entered the top 16 in the world rankings.

His first ranking tournament win came in January 1996, when he won the Welsh Open title, beating John Parrott 9–3 in the final. He failed to qualify for the 1996 World Championship but in October 1996 he won the first ranking event of the new season, the Grand Prix, defeating surprise finalist Euan Henderson 9‍–‍5. He won the British Open in April 1997, beating Stephen Hendry 9–2 in the final. At the 1997 World Championship, he was drawn against his coach Terry Griffiths, who was making his last appearance at the Crucible as a participant. Williams eventually defeated Griffiths 10–9 on the black, but he then lost 8‍–‍13 to Hendry in the last 16. He took his first Masters title in February 1998, defeating Hendry 10–9 in the final, which ended in a black-ball finish in the deciding frame, after Williams had recovered from 6–9 down. He reached the semi-finals of the 1998 World Championship, losing 14–17 to Ken Doherty. The following year, he made it through to the final of the 1999 World Championship and finished the tournament as runner-up to Hendry, losing the final 11‍–‍18.

=== 1999–2005 ===
Williams had a very successful 1999–00 season, winning both the UK Championship and the World Championship. These results, along with another ranking title at the 2000 Thailand Masters and three runner-up positions, allowed him to capture the world number one position for the first time. At the UK Championship in November 1999, he defeated Hendry 9–6 in the semi-final before beating his fellow countryman Matthew Stevens 10–8 in the final. In the 2000 World Championship final, he recovered from 7–13 behind against Stevens to eventually win 18‍–‍16. Williams was the first left-handed player to win the World Championship at The Crucible. He also produced a notable comeback in his semi-final match against Higgins, coming from 10–14 down to win 17–15.

He won only one ranking event in the 2000–01 season—the 2000 Grand Prix—with a 9–5 victory over Ronnie O'Sullivan in the final. He was a runner-up in two other ranking events: the 2000 UK Championship, where he lost 4–10 to Higgins in the final; and the 2000 China Open, where he was beaten 3–9 by O'Sullivan. This was enough for him to retain his number one world ranking, although his title defence at the 2001 World Championship ended in the second round with a 12–13 defeat to Joe Swail. In the 2001–02 season, Williams struggled to find his best form from previous seasons and again won only one ranking tournament—the 2002 China Open—where he defeated Anthony Hamilton 9–8 from 5–8 down in the final. However, he was then defeated by Hamilton 9–13 in the second round of the 2002 World Championship and subsequently lost the number one world ranking to O'Sullivan.

The 2002–03 season was exceptional for Williams as he won all three Triple Crown events: the 2002 UK Championship, 2003 Masters and the 2003 World Championship. He was only the fourth player after Stephen Hendry, Steve Davis and John Higgins to hold the three titles simultaneously, and only the third player after Davis and Hendry to have won them all in one season. These results enabled him to reclaim the number one spot at the end of the season. He became just the second player, after Ray Reardon, to reclaim the number one ranking position. He beat Doherty 10–9 in the UK Championship final, and he beat Hendry 10–4 in the Masters final. Before the 2003 World Championship, he had a scare when his cue was damaged and bent on his flight with Ryanair on his way to play in the Irish Masters, but he had it repaired before the tournament. He had a relatively untroubled route to the 2003 World Championship final, with wins over Stuart Pettman 10–2, Quinten Hann 13–2, Hendry 13–7 and Stephen Lee 17–8. In the final against Doherty, he developed a 10–2 lead and appeared to be heading for an emphatic victory, before Doherty fought back to tie the match 16–16. Williams regained his composure to win the last two frames and lift the world trophy for the second time.

The following season, he lost in the first round of the 2003 UK Championship to Fergal O'Brien, ending his record run of 48 tournaments in which he had won his first match. In February 2004, he was unable to defend his title at the Masters; after defeating Stevens in the first round, he then lost a close match to Paul Hunter 5–6 in the quarter-finals. His title defence at the 2004 World Championship ended with an 11–13 defeat in the second round to Joe Perry. He endured a run of poor form over the 2004–05 season, including a first-round defeat to Jimmy White at the Masters where he lost 5–6. On 20 April 2005, at the World Championship, Williams became the first Welshman and the fifth player in history to score a maximum break at the Crucible in the World Championship. This came in the final frame of a 10–1 first-round victory over Robert Milkins, winning him £161,000 in prize money, but he then lost in the second round to Ian McCulloch 12–13.

=== 2006–2009 ===
On 26 March 2006, Williams won the 16th ranking event of his career, and his first in two and a half years—the 2006 China Open in Beijing—defeating Higgins 9–8 in the final. The victory helped Williams retain his top-16 place in the world rankings. He also performed well at the 2006 World Championship, beating Hamilton 10–1 and Mark Selby 13–8 to set up a quarter-final clash with O'Sullivan. It was the first time the two had met in a match at the Crucible, and their well-publicised rivalry brought some extra tension to the encounter (although O'Sullivan has since said that the former feud has been replaced by friendship and mutual respect). In a closely contested match, O'Sullivan eventually won 13–11. It was revealed during the 2005–06 season that Williams and his coach Griffiths had parted company.

Williams won the Pot Black trophy in September 2006. In the final against Higgins, he compiled a century break of 119 which was the highest break in the history of the tournament. However, 2006–07 turned out to be perhaps the worst season of his career, as he lost his first match in a string of tournaments, including the 2007 Masters where he was whitewashed 0–6 by Neil Robertson, and the 2007 World Championship where he lost 9–10 to Swail.

At the 2007 UK Championship, some of his previous form returned as he defeated Ricky Walden 9–3 in the last 32, before facing Mark Allen in the last 16; after trailing 0–4 and 1–5, Williams produced a comeback to win eight successive frames for a 9–5 victory. His run ended in the quarter-finals, where he lost to Stephen Maguire 5–9.

After a 2–6 first-round loss to Doherty at the 2008 Masters, Williams revealed that he was considering retirement from the game if he dropped out of the top 32 and was forced to play in the qualifying competitions, although he was then only 32 years old. He later commented that the statement had been blown out of proportion, and that he intended to remain on the professional circuit. He began to show more consistency for the remainder of the season, reaching the last 16 of three ranking events as well as a run to the quarter-finals of the 2008 China Open, where a 3–5 loss to Ryan Day deprived him of a place in his first semi-final for two years. He was defeated 7–13 by O'Sullivan in the second round of the 2008 World Championship, which forced him out of the world's top 16 and pushed him into the qualifiers for the next season. It was announced on 8 July 2008 that Williams had split from his management company 110 Sport, as O'Sullivan and Maguire had done previously.

In the 2008–09 season, he suffered three qualifying defeats but also reached the quarter-finals of the 2008 UK Championship, where he beat both Selby and Graeme Dott 9–7, before narrowly losing 8–9 to Ali Carter. He qualified for the 2009 World Championship but lost 7–10 to Hendry after leading 7–5. Towards the end of the match, Williams was hampered by having problems with his cue tip.

=== 2009–2013 ===
The 2009–10 season started badly for Williams when he broke his wrist in a fall at home less than a month before the 2009 Shanghai Masters, which was the first ranking event of the season. He played in Shanghai despite the injury, losing in the second round 1‍–‍5 against Higgins. He reached the semi-finals of the 2009 Grand Prix, where after making a 142 century break (the highest of the tournament) he was defeated 1‍–‍6 by Ding Junhui. He was leading Dott 6‍–‍2 at the 2009 UK Championship when Dott retired due to illness. Williams then lost 8‍–‍9 against Peter Lines in the last 16. At the 2010 Masters, he won in the first round 6‍–‍3 against Carter to progress to the quarter-finals, despite being involved in a traffic accident the day before the match. It was reported that someone had driven into the back of the car that was carrying Williams and Hendry to a restaurant. He was then narrowly defeated 5‍–‍6 by O'Sullivan in the semi-finals.

After these signs of form, in April 2010 Williams won his first ranking tournament in four years: the 2010 China Open. He met Ding in the final and, despite trailing 3‍–‍5 at one stage, he eventually won the match 10‍–‍6. This was his 17th ranking event win and his third China Open title. After the victory, Williams said: "I'm over the moon to win again. It's been a long time coming but I've kept working hard and I felt that in the end the results would come." At the 2010 World Championship, he lost his second-round match against O'Sullivan 10‍–‍13.

Williams opened the 2010–11 season by winning the first event of the Players Tour Championship, defeating Maguire 4‍–‍0 in the final. The event was a new addition to the snooker calendar introduced by Barry Hearn, whose appointment as the new Chairman of World Snooker had been supported by Williams. Finishing sixth on the Players Tour Championship Order of Merit, Williams was selected to compete in the 2010 Premier League—marking the first time that he had competed in the event for five years. However, he failed to qualify for the semi-finals. He reached the final of the 2010 UK Championship, his run including a 9‍–‍8 victory over Murphy in the semi-finals after trailing 6‍–‍8. He lost in the final 9‍–‍10 against Higgins, after earlier leading 7‍–‍2 and 9‍–‍5; he was also 29 points ahead in the 17th frame with only the colours remaining, and Higgins needed a snooker to stay in the match.

His next tournament was the 2011 Masters, where he lost 4‍–‍6 in the first round against Ding. Williams won the first ranking event of 2011, the German Masters, defeating Selby 9‍–‍7 in the final. At the 2011 China Open, he lost in the first round 4‍–‍5 against Lee, after making four centuries. At the 2011 World Snooker Championship, he defeated Day 10‍–‍5 in the first round and Jamie Cope 13‍–‍4 in the second round. He then won his quarter-final against Allen 13‍–‍5, and in doing so he reached the semi-final stage for the first time since 2003, but he lost 14‍–‍17 against Higgins. As a result of Selby's exit from the tournament, Williams became the new world number one after the event.

He was partnered with Stevens to represent Wales at the 2011 World Cup, and they reached the semi-finals, losing 1‍–‍4 against China. Williams then won through to the final of the 2011 Australian Goldfields Open but lost 8‍–‍9 against Bingham, after leading 8‍–‍5 at one stage of the match. He also lost from a winning position in the final of the next major ranking event, the 2011 Shanghai Masters. His run included a 6‍–‍5 win over Robertson in the semi-finals, and he led Selby 9‍–‍7 in the final before losing the last three frames for a 9‍–‍10 defeat. With the loss, he also relinquished the world number one spot to Selby. He was beaten in the last 16 of the 2011 UK Championship by Walden, and he reached the quarter-finals in his defence of the 2012 German Masters, where he succumbed 3‍–‍5 to Lee. Williams played in eleven of the twelve PTC events throughout the season, but could only reach the last 32 twice, in Event 10 and Event 11. He was ranked 82nd in the PTC Order of Merit, a long way outside the top 24 players who made the Finals.

Williams generated controversy ahead of the 2012 World Snooker Championship by stating on his Twitter page that he "hates" the tournament's venue, swore while describing the Crucible Theatre, and said he hoped the event would be played in China soon. A spokesperson from the World Professional Billiards and Snooker Association (WPBSA) confirmed that a statement would be released regarding the matter. Drawn to play Liu Chuang in the first round, Williams won 10‍–‍6 to set up a second-round clash with O'Sullivan, which he lost 6‍–‍13. The result meant that Williams had not beaten O'Sullivan in a ranking event for over a decade. He ended the season ranked world number three. A WPBSA statement revealed that Williams had been fined a total of £4,000 for the comments he had made before the World Championship. Williams was inducted into the World Snooker Tour Hall of Fame in 2012.

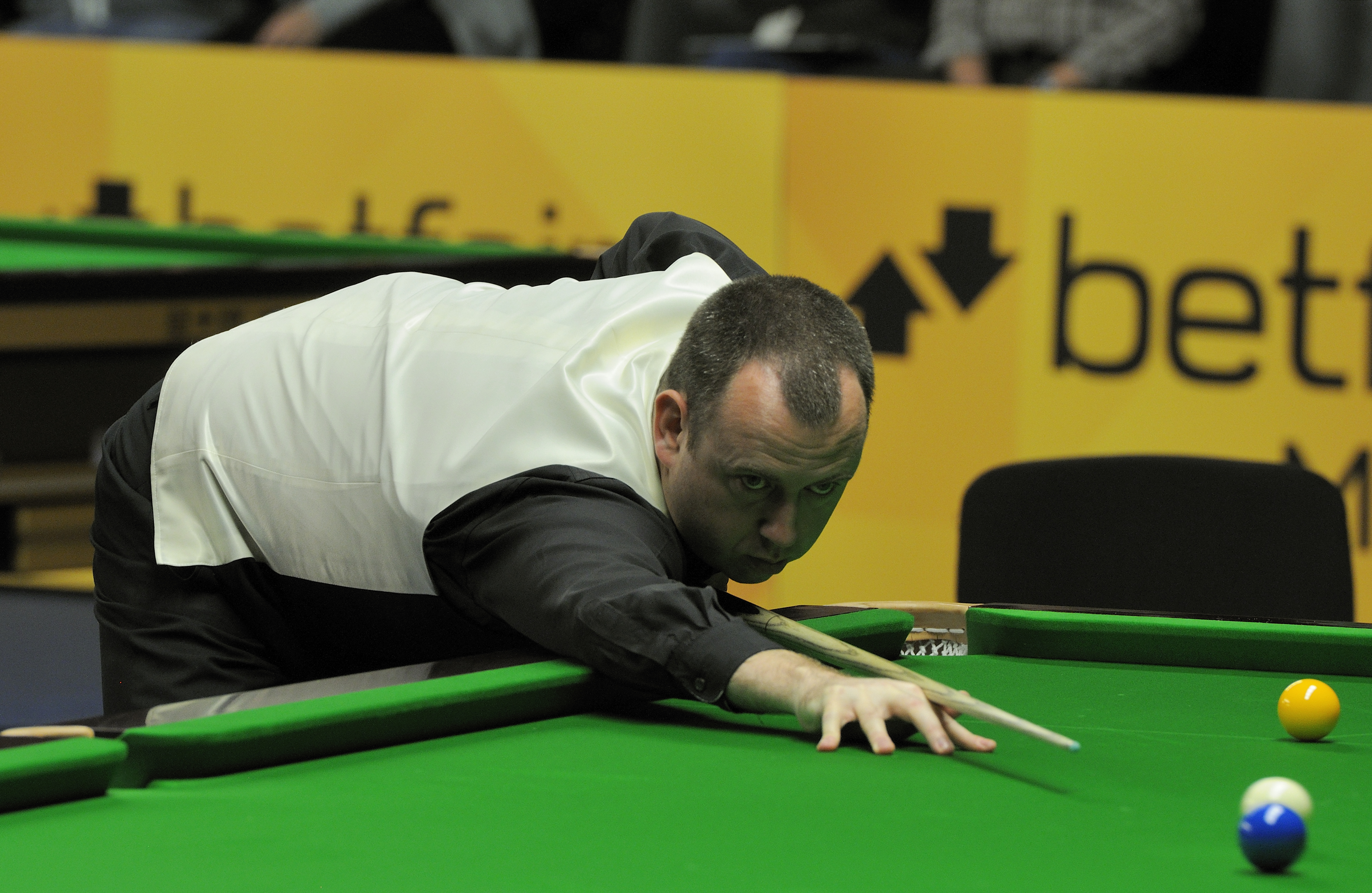
2013 German Masters

His first ranking event of the 2012–13 season was the 2012 Wuxi Classic, where he lost 3‍–‍5 to Marcus Campbell in the quarter-finals. He went one better at the 2012 Shanghai Masters where he faced Judd Trump in the semi-finals. Williams fell 1‍–‍5 behind, but he fought back to trail 4‍–‍5 before losing the next frame to come up short of completing a comeback and was defeated 4‍–‍6. He then suffered a significant dip in form as he lost in the first round of several ranking events; after his 3‍–‍6 defeat to Mark King in the 2012 UK Championship, he said that he was contemplating retirement.

During his string of defeats, he managed to beat Stevens in the non-ranking 2013 Masters from 1‍–‍4 down (which would have been 1‍–‍5 had Stevens not missed a crucial pot), before losing 1‍–‍6 to the eventual champion Selby. His poor form continued as he was beaten 1‍–‍5 by Michael Holt in the last 32 of the 2013 German Masters. At the 2013 China Open in March, Williams won his first match in a ranking event since September with a 5‍–‍2 victory over Lü Haotian and continued his run by defeating Carter 5‍–‍4, but he then lost 1‍–‍5 to Selby in the quarter-finals. At the 2013 World Championship, he lost in the first round 6‍–‍10 to debuting compatriot Michael White and admitted afterwards that he could not wait to forget this past season, but he was committed to playing in the next one. Owing to his poor performance in 2012‍–‍13, Williams dropped 12 places in the rankings to world number 15.

=== 2013–2017 ===
At the start of the 2013–14 season, he won the Rotterdam Open by defeating Selby 4‍–‍3 in the final. This was the second time that Williams had won a title in a Players Tour Championship event. However, he had a poor season in ranking events, failing to reach a single quarter-final for the first time since 2006‍–‍07. In February, after securing a 4‍–‍3 win over world number one Robertson in the last 32 of the Welsh Open, he said that he was glad he had ignored Hendry's advice to retire and believed he still had ranking event titles left in him. He had chances to move 3‍–‍0 ahead in the last 16 against Marco Fu, but eventually lost 2‍–‍4; he said afterwards that the Williams who had won two world titles many years ago was "dead". At the 2014 World Championship, he lost 8‍–‍10 to Alan McManus in qualifying and was absent from the main stage of the tournament for the first time since 1996. He ended the season as world number 18, the first time in six years that he had finished outside the top 16.

Williams lost in the second round of his first two ranking events of the 2014‍–‍15 season. His first quarter-final of the campaign was at the 2014 International Championship; after trailing O'Sullivan 0‍–‍3, he won five successive frames with a high break of 120. The match went to a deciding frame, which Williams won to beat his opponent for the first time in 12 years. His semi-final match against Allen also ended in a deciding frame, after Williams had trailed 4‍–‍7, but a miss on the final red proved crucial as he lost 8‍–‍9. He was defeated 2‍–‍6 by Maguire in the third round of the 2014 UK Championship.

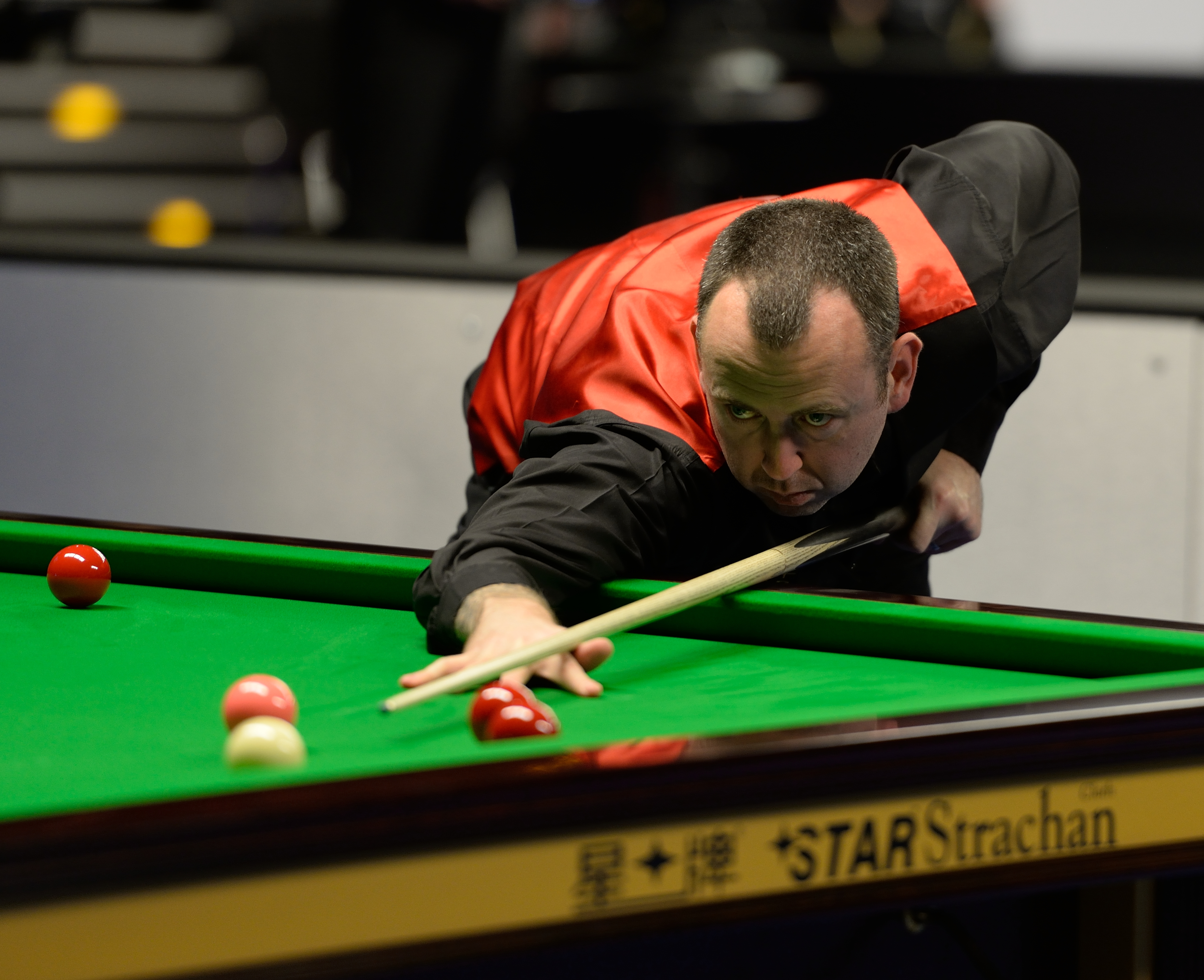
Williams at the 2015 German Masters

After knocking out Trump 4‍–‍1 to reach the quarter-finals of the 2015 Welsh Open, Williams said that he no longer expected to win tournaments and was more concerned with improving his ranking. He then made two centuries in defeating Fu 5‍–‍1 to earn a place in the semi-finals of the event for the first time since 2003. From 3‍–‍5 behind, he took advantage of missed chances by Ben Woollaston to send their match into a deciding frame, but he lost it and just fell short of reaching the final in his home tournament. He progressed to the final of the minor-ranking Gdynia Open but was whitewashed 0‍–‍4 by Robertson. Williams took part in the World Seniors Championship in March 2015 despite only being 39 years old, as he would turn 40 before the end of the season, and he won the title by beating O'Brien 2‍–‍1 in the final.

After defeating Thepchaiya Un-Nooh 4‍–‍1 in the first round of the Players Championship Grand Final, Williams defeated both Selby and Matthew Selt 4‍–‍3. He then progressed to his first major ranking event final in more than three years with a 4‍–‍2 win over Trump and developed a 3‍–‍0 lead against Perry. However, his highest break in the next four frames was 14, as Perry fought back to win the match 4‍–‍3. In a rematch of the 2000 final, Williams faced Stevens in the first round of the 2015 World Championship, but he was heavily defeated 2‍–‍10.

At the end of 2015, he was knocked out in the second round of the UK Championship by Tom Ford 5‍–‍6, after leading 5‍–‍3. He drew O'Sullivan in the first round of the 2016 Masters and was 4‍–‍2 ahead, but the match went to a deciding frame in which Williams missed a risky plant and lost 5‍–‍6. He was eliminated in the fourth round of the 2016 Welsh Open, where he lost 2‍–‍4 to Selby, and in the first round of three other ranking events, also failing to qualify for the 2016 China Open. At the 2016 World Championship, he defeated Holt 13‍–‍8 in the last 16 to reach the quarter-finals of the championship for the first time in five years. However, he was heavily defeated 3‍–‍13 by Ding in the quarter-finals, with a session to spare.

He beat Higgins 4‍–‍1 at the 2016 Northern Ireland Open, before losing 4‍–‍5 to Kyren Wilson in the quarter-finals. He reached another quarter-final at the 2016 UK Championship but was defeated 2‍–‍6 by O'Sullivan. He made it through to the final of the 2017 China Open where his opponent was Selby. Williams needed to win the match to re-enter the top 16 and avoid having to qualify for the World Championship. He led 8‍–‍7 but lost the last three frames for an 8‍–‍10 defeat, missing out on his first ranking title for six years. He reached the last-32 qualifying round at the World Championship but was defeated by Stuart Carrington 7‍–‍10. This was only his second absence from the knockout stage of the World Championship since his first appearance at the tournament in 1997.

=== 2017–2021 ===
After losing his place in the top 16 of the world rankings in 2017, Williams teamed up with his friend Lee Walker who worked as a coach for Stephen Feeney's SightRight in an effort to revive his career. He won the Six-red World Championship in September, defeating Un-Nooh 8–2 in the final in Bangkok; with the scores level at 2–2, Williams won six consecutive frames to seal the victory. He then won his first ranking title after a six-year drought, the 2017 Northern Ireland Open, defeating Yan Bingtao 9–8 in the final; it was an emotional win for Williams, as he revealed that his wife had been suffering from ill health, and he had considered withdrawing from several tournaments. He faced Selby in the first round of the 2018 Masters, recovering from 3–5 behind to defeat the reigning world champion 6–5, before losing 1–6 to Kyren Wilson in the quarter-finals. At the 2018 German Masters, he beat Trump 6‍–‍1 to reach the final where he faced Dott. Williams dominated the final, making six breaks over 50 and one century (a 110) in the eighth frame as he claimed a 9–1 victory.

He advanced to the semi-finals of the 2018 World Championship with a 13–8 win over Carter. Williams stated that if he won the World Championship he would do his press conference naked. He played Barry Hawkins in the semi-finals and Hawkins proved to be his most difficult opponent of the tournament so far: Williams levelled the match at 15–15 and secured two more frames to win 17–15. Reaching his first World Championship final since 2003, he came up against fellow "Class of '92" member, Higgins. The match was described as one of the best finals in the history of the tournament, Williams winning 18–16 to claim his third world title. Aged 43, this made him the oldest winner since Reardon, who had won the title in 1978 aged 45. (O'Sullivan won his sixth world title in 2020, aged 44, meaning that Williams is now the third-oldest winner of a world title in the modern era.) It also marked 15 years since his previous world title, making it the longest gap between consecutive titles. After winning the final, Williams thanked his late sponsor Ron Skinner who had died two months earlier, and his wife for convincing him not to retire. As promised, he appeared naked at the press conference later, but he was instructed to wear a towel.

As world champion, Williams won the second event of the new season, the 2018 World Open. Recovering from 0–3 behind in his quarter-final against Jack Lisowski to win 5‍–‍3, he then came back from 2–5 down in his semi-final against Noppon Saengkham to win 6–5. In the final against David Gilbert, he recovered from another sizeable deficit of 5–9 to win the match 10–9. At the 2018 UK Championship, Williams reached the last-16 round where he took a 4‍–‍0 lead over Maguire but lost 5–6 after his opponent made a comeback. At the 2019 Masters, he lost 3–6 to Robertson, having led 3–1. At the 2019 World Championship, his world title defence ended in the second round with a 9–13 loss to Gilbert.

Williams began the 2019–20 season positioned third in the world rankings. In early September, he reached the semi-finals of the 2019 Six-red World Championship, where he lost 5–7 to Higgins. He later reached the final of the 2019 China Championship; having been 5–9 behind to Murphy, Williams won four frames to force a deciding frame, which he lost. During the 2019 UK Championship, Williams commented that he "hates" snooker and would prefer to be playing golf. He then lost 2–6 to Michael White in the second round. After losing 2–6 to Stuart Bingham in the first round of the 2020 Masters, he admitted that his career was at a "crossroads". He reached the quarter-finals of the 2020 World Championship, where he played O'Sullivan. Williams took a 7–2 lead but ultimately lost the match 10–13.

He lost in the first round of the 2021 Masters with a 4–6 defeat to Murphy. Williams won the 2021 WST Pro Series in March, his first title for three years, finishing top of the final group. He defeated long-term rival Higgins 13–7 in the second round of the 2021 World Championship, before losing 3–13 in the quarter-finals to Selby. During the championship, Williams generated some controversy by gently rolling his break shot off the bottom cushion so the cue ball would nestle into the reds, as a safety shot. The WPBSA players association contacted players to ask whether the shot should be banned.

=== 2021–present ===
Williams won his 24th ranking title in August 2021, defeating Gary Wilson 6–4 in the final of the British Open. He lost 5–6 to Hamilton in the second round of the 2021 UK Championship after reportedly falling asleep during the match. At the 2022 Masters, he developed a 5–3 lead against Robertson in the semi-finals, but Robertson fought back to win the match, including laying the two snookers that he needed to win the final frame. Williams reached the semi-finals of the 2022 World Championship, where he recovered from 5–12 down against Trump to level the match at 16–16, but Trump won the deciding frame for a place in the final. Williams compiled 16 centuries during the tournament, equalling the record set in 2002 by Hendry for centuries in a single World Championship.

At the end of 2022, Williams lost in the first round of the UK Championship to Jamie Clarke 3–6, reportedly feeling unwell with an upset stomach during the match. At the 2023 Masters, he beat O'Sullivan for the first time in eight years with a 6–5 victory in their quarter-final clash. Williams went on to reach the final, where he was defeated 8–10 by Trump. He was eliminated in the second round of the 2023 World Championship by Luca Brecel, 11–13.

In October 2023, Williams defeated Selby 10–7 in the final of the British Open in Cheltenham to become the then second-oldest winner of a ranking event. Two months later, he was defeated 5–6 by Ding in the quarter-finals of the UK Championship. Williams won their eighth frame 101–94, which marked the highest scoring frame in snooker history. In January 2024, he lost in the first round of the Masters to Carter 4–6. He won the Tour Championship in April, after a 10–5 victory against O'Sullivan, in which he came from 3–5 down to win seven consecutive frames for the title. At the 2024 World Championship, he suffered a first-round defeat to Si Jiahui 9–10.

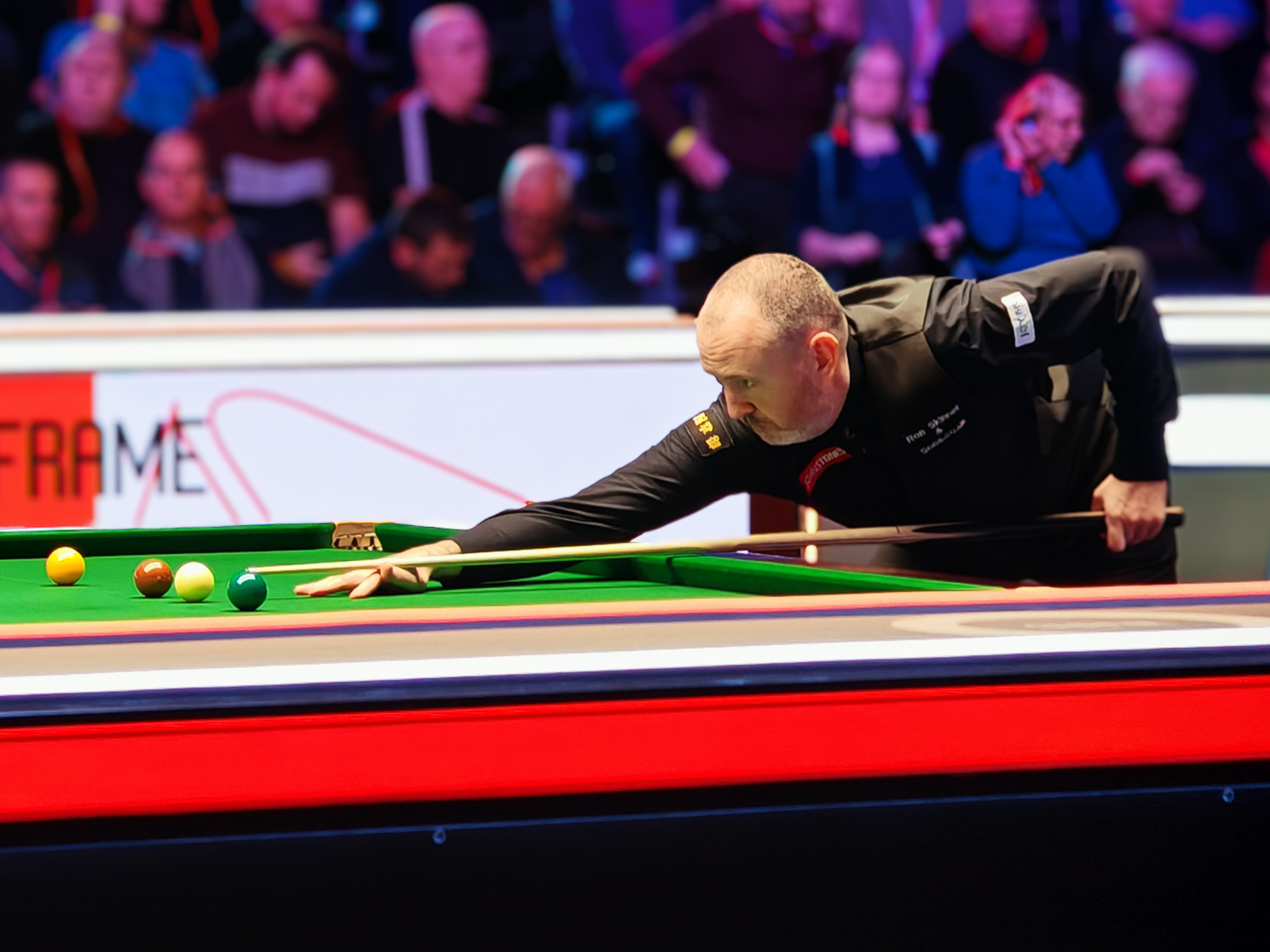
Williams at the 2025 Masters

In September 2024, Williams reached the final of the Saudi Arabia Snooker Masters where he was defeated 9–10 by Trump. Williams had held a 62-point lead in the final frame before he missed a red. In November, he defeated women's world champion Bai Yulu 4–1 in the opening round of the 2024 Champion of Champions, marking his maiden win at the event, before securing a win over Kyren Wilson in the following round. He went on to win his first Champion of Champions title with a 10–6 victory over Xiao Guodong in the final. He was defeated by Bingham 5–6 in the first round of the 2024 UK Championship, and he lost 5–6 to Ding at the same stage of the 2025 Masters.

In the build-up to the 2025 World Championship, Williams revealed that he had been suffering issues with his eyesight and was downbeat on his chances at the Crucible, saying "Whoever qualifies is going to be praying they draw me in the first round." There, Williams advanced to the semi-finals after edging past Higgins 13–12 in their last eight clash. The result marked Williams's fifth win in six meetings with Higgins at the Crucible. He then overcame Trump 17–14 in the semi-finals, and aged 50, became the oldest player to reach the final of the World Championship, superseding fellow Welshman Reardon who was 49 when he played the final in 1982. In the final against Zhao Xintong, Williams lost the opening session 1–7, and trailed 8–17 after the third session. Williams won the opening four frames in the evening, before losing the match 12–18.

The following season, Williams won the 2025 Xi'an Grand Prix, defeating Murphy 10–3 in the final. At the age of 50 years and 206 days, he became the oldest player ever to win a ranking event, surpassing Reardon, who had been 50 years and 14 days old when he won the 1982 Professional Players Tournament 43 years previously. Williams also became the first player to win professional titles in his teens, 20s, 30s, 40s, and 50s. In January 2026, he lost 2–6 to Allen in the opening round of the Masters. Williams progressed to the last-16 at the 2026 World Championship, where he was defeated 9–13 by Hawkins.

In the semi-finals at the 2026 English Open, Williams recovered from 1–5 behind to beat Murphy 6–5 and set up a final against Carter. He was beaten 6–9. He was defeated in a final-frame decider by Jak Jones in the semi-finals at the Northern Ireland Open.

== Playing style ==
Williams is known for his laid-back demeanour and has been described by some snooker pundits as one of the greatest long potters in the game. As of March 2025 he is tenth on the all-time list of century makers, having compiled more than 600 competitive centuries during his professional career.

An unusual aspect of his playing style is a tendency to sometimes position his cue directly beneath his body, rather than using the rest, in an underarm style. He is also known for sometimes playing shots one-handed. Williams has said, "I play them all the time in practice and in matches, I don't miss many underarm shots". He is partially colour blind and has difficulty distinguishing between the red balls and the brown.

Williams is nicknamed "The Welsh Potting Machine". He has won over £8 million in prize money during his career.

== Personal life ==
In 2010, Williams became co-owner of Tredegar Snooker Hall in Georgetown, Blaenau Gwent. He is a keen poker player and has played on the European Poker Tour. Williams also enjoys playing golf. He married his partner Joanne in 2011, and the couple have three sons who were born in 2004, 2007 and 2014. He is friends with former boxer Joe Calzaghe. Williams was awarded a Member of the Order of the British Empire in the 2004 Queens's Birthday Honours.

== Performance and rankings timeline ==
Below is a list of competition results for professional seasons starting from 1992.

Tournament	1992/ 93	1993/ 94	1994/ 95	1995/ 96	1996/ 97	1997/ 98	1998/ 99	1999/ 00	2000/ 01	2001/ 02	2002/ 03	2003/ 04		2004/ 05	2005/ 06	2006/ 07	2007/ 08	2008/ 09	2009/ 10	2010/ 11	2011/ 12	2012/ 13	2013/ 14	2014/ 15	2015/ 16	2016/ 17	2017/ 18	2018/ 19	2019/ 20	2020/ 21	2021/ 22	2022/ 23	2023/ 24	2024/ 25	2025/ 26	2026/ 27
Ranking (Note: It shows the ranking at the beginning of the season)	(Note: New players on the Main Tour do not have a ranking)	119	58	39	16	4	5	3	1	1	2	1		2	9	8	12	22	15	8	1	3	15	18	14	13	16	3	3	10	11	7	10	9	3	7
Ranking tournaments
Championship League	Tournament Not Held																Non-Ranking Event													WD	RR	2R	F	3R	A	WD
China Open (Note: The event was called the China International (1997/1998–1998/1999))	Tournament Not Held					NR	2R	QF	F	W	Not Held			QF	W	1R	QF	1R	W	1R	2R	QF	2R	3R	LQ	F	QF	1R	Tournament Not Held							1R
Wuhan Open	Tournament Not Held																																WD	WD	SF	QF
British Open	1R	1R	1R	QF	W	SF	3R	3R	3R	3R	SF	QF		3R	Tournament Not Held																W	1R	W	LQ	QF	LQ
English Open	Tournament Not Held																									4R	3R	3R	2R	WD	WD	QF	3R	1R	2R	F
Shenzhen Open (Note: The event was called the Xi'an Grand Prix (2024/2025–2025/2026))	Tournament Not Held																																	3R	W	LQ
Northern Ireland Open	Tournament Not Held																									QF	W	2R	A	2R	3R	QF	1R	QF	WD	SF
International Championship	Tournament Not Held																					1R	2R	SF	2R	1R	3R	1R	1R	Not Held			1R	3R	1R	3R
UK Championship	1R	LQ	3R	QF	QF	3R	3R	W	F	SF	W	2R		2R	3R	3R	QF	QF	2R	F	2R	1R	3R	3R	2R	QF	3R	4R	2R	3R	2R	1R	QF	1R	2R	
Shoot Out	Tournament Not Held																			Non-ranking Event						2R	4R	A	2R	SF	F	3R	2R	A	A	
Scottish Open (Note: The event was called the International Open (1992/1993–1996/1997) and the Players Championship (2003/2004))	1R	LQ	2R	2R	3R	1R	QF	F	3R	3R	3R	QF		Tournament Not Held								MR	Not Held			4R	WD	A	A	4R	WD	3R	LQ	WD	WD	
German Masters (Note: The event was called the German Open (1995/1996–1997/1998))	Not Held			1R	QF	1R	NR	Tournament Not Held												W	QF	1R	2R	1R	1R	1R	W	QF	2R	LQ	1R	LQ	1R	1R	1R	
Welsh Open	LQ	LQ	3R	W	SF	1R	W	3R	SF	2R	F	3R		2R	QF	2R	3R	LQ	QF	QF	2R	1R	4R	SF	4R	1R	3R	2R	3R	SF	1R	1R	2R	2R	3R	
World Grand Prix	Tournament Not Held																							NR	1R	1R	1R	1R	2R	DNQ	1R	QF	QF	1R	1R	
Players Championship (Note: The event was called the Players Tour Championship Grand Final (2010/2011–2015/2016))	Tournament Not Held																			QF	DNQ	1R	2R	F	1R	DNQ	SF	QF	1R	1R	QF	DNQ	1R	QF	QF	
World Open (Note: The event was called the Grand Prix (1992/1993–2000/2001 and 2004/2005–2009/2010) and the LG Cup (2001/2002–2003/2004))	LQ	2R	1R	1R	W	2R	2R	F	W	QF	3R	W		1R	1R	WD	RR	LQ	SF	SF	1R	1R	2R	Not Held		3R	QF	W	A	Not Held			WD	LQ	2R	
Tour Championship	Tournament Not Held																											QF	DNQ	DNQ	QF	DNQ	W	1R	1R	
World Championship	LQ	LQ	LQ	LQ	2R	SF	F	W	2R	2R	W	2R		2R	QF	1R	2R	1R	2R	SF	2R	1R	LQ	1R	QF	LQ	W	2R	QF	QF	SF	2R	1R	F	2R	
Non-ranking tournaments
Shanghai Masters	Tournament Not Held																Ranking Event											QF	2R	Not Held			2R	2R	2R	QF
Champion of Champions	Tournament Not Held																						A	A	A	A	A	1R	A	A	1R	A	1R	W	QF	
Riyadh Season Championship (Note: The event was called the World Masters of Snooker (2023/2024))	Tournament Not Held																																2R	SF	QF	
The Masters	LQ	LQ	1R	LQ	QF	W	QF	QF	1R	F	W	QF		QF	QF	1R	1R	LQ	SF	1R	QF	QF	A	A	1R	1R	QF	1R	1R	1R	SF	F	1R	1R	1R	
Championship League	Tournament Not Held																RR	RR	RR	SF	RR	RR	RR	RR	SF	RR	2R	A	RR	F	WD	WD	A	A	A	
World Seniors Championship	Tournament Not Held																			A	A	A	A	W	1R	A	A	NH	A	A	A	A	A	A	WD	
Former ranking tournaments
Asian Classic (Note: The event was called the Dubai Classic (1992/1993–1994/1995) and the Thailand Classic (1995/1996))	LQ	LQ	LQ	LQ	2R	Tournament Not Held																														
Malta Grand Prix	Not Held		Non-Ranking Event					F	NR	Tournament Not Held																										
Thailand Masters (Note: The event was called the Asian Open (1992/1993) and the Thailand Open (1993/1994–1996/1997))	LQ	LQ	1R	LQ	2R	QF	W	W	2R	W	NR	Tournament Not Held				NR	Tournament Not Held																			
Irish Masters	Non-Ranking Event										QF	2R		SF	NH	NR	Tournament Not Held																			
Northern Ireland Trophy	Tournament Not Held														NR	3R	2R	3R	Tournament Not Held																	
Bahrain Championship	Tournament Not Held																	LQ	Tournament Not Held																	
Wuxi Classic (Note: The event was called the Jiangsu Classic (2008/2009–2009/2010))	Tournament Not Held																	Non-Ranking Event				QF	3R	2R	Tournament Not Held											
Australian Goldfields Open (Note: The event was called the Australian Open (1994/1995) and the Australian Masters (1995/1996))	Not Held		Non-Ranking		Tournament Not Held																F	A	A	A	A	Tournament Not Held										
Shanghai Masters	Tournament Not Held																1R	QF	2R	2R	F	SF	LQ	2R	QF	1R	QF	Non-Ranking		Not Held			Non-Ranking Event			
Indian Open	Tournament Not Held																						3R	SF	NH	2R	A	A	Tournament Not Held							
Riga Masters (Note: The event was called the Riga Open (2014/2015–2015/2016))	Tournament Not Held																							Minor-Rank		SF	SF	2R	2R	Tournament Not Held						
China Championship	Tournament Not Held																									NR	QF	3R	F	Tournament Not Held						
WST Pro Series	Tournament Not Held																													W	Tournament Not Held					
Turkish Masters	Tournament Not Held																														1R	Tournament Not Held				
Gibraltar Open	Tournament Not Held																								MR	QF	A	A	SF	2R	WD	Tournament Not Held				
WST Classic	Tournament Not Held																															2R	Tournament Not Held			
European Masters (Note: The event was called the European Open (1992/1993–1996/1997), the Irish Open (1998/1999) and the Malta Cup (2004/2005–2007/2008))	3R	1R	LQ	1R	1R	NH	W	Not Held		SF	SF	1R		1R	QF	1R	NR	Tournament Not Held								LQ	QF	WD	1R	2R	WD	SF	2R	Not Held		
Former non-ranking tournaments
Australian Goldfields Open	Not Held		SF	A	Tournament Not Held																Ranking Event					Tournament Not Held										
China International	Tournament Not Held					QF	Ranking Event				Not Held			Ranking Event															Tournament Not Held							
German Masters	Not Held			Ranking Event			F	Tournament Not Held												Ranking Event																
Millennium Cup	Tournament Not Held							SF	Tournament Not Held																											
Pontins Professional	A	A	A	QF	QF	W	SF	QF	Tournament Not Held																											
Malta Grand Prix	Not Held		A	A	SF	QF	SF	R	F	Tournament Not Held																										
Champions Cup (Note: The event was called the Charity Challenge (1994/1995–1998/1999))	Not Held		A	A	A	QF	1R	F	F	F	Tournament Not Held																									
Scottish Masters	A	A	A	A	QF	A	QF	SF	SF	SF	QF	Tournament Not Held																								
World Champions v Asia Stars	Tournament Not Held													RR	Tournament Not Held																					
Northern Ireland Trophy	Tournament Not Held														1R	Ranking Event			Tournament Not Held																	
Irish Masters	A	A	A	A	A	QF	1R	QF	SF	QF	Ranking Event				NH	A	Tournament Not Held																			
Euro-Asia Masters Challenge	Tournament Not Held											SF	RR	Not Held			A	Tournament Not Held																		
Pot Black	A	A	Tournament Not Held												A	W	QF	Tournament Not Held																		
Malta Cup	Ranking Event					Tournament Not Held				Ranking Event							RR	Tournament Not Held								Ranking Event										
Masters Qualifying Event (Note: The event was also called the Benson & Hedges Championship (1990/1991–2002/2003))	MR	1R	W	3R	A	A	A	A	A	A	A	A		NH	A	A	A	2R	A	A	Tournament Not Held															
Power Snooker	Tournament Not Held																			A	1R	Tournament Not Held														
Premier League (Note: The event was called the northern igue (1992/1993–1996/1997))	A	A	A	A	A	RR	SF	F	RR	SF	F	SF		F	A	A	A	A	A	RR	SF	A	Tournament Not Held													
World Grand Prix	Tournament Not Held																							QF	Ranking Event											
General Cup (Note: The event was called the General Cup International (2004/2005–2011/2012))	Tournament Not Held													A	Tournament Not Held				A	NH	A	A	A	A	F	Tournament Not Held										
Shoot Out	Tournament Not Held																			1R	2R	QF	1R	3R	SF	Ranking Event										
China Championship	Tournament Not Held																									1R	Ranking Event			Tournament Not Held						
Romanian Masters	Tournament Not Held																										1R	Tournament Not Held								
Macau Masters	Tournament Not Held																											F	Tournament Not Held							
Hong Kong Masters	Tournament Not Held																										A	Tournament Not Held				QF	Tournament Not Held			
Six-red World Championship (Note: The event was called the Six-red Snooker International (2008/2009) and the Six-red World Grand Prix (2009/2010))	Tournament Not Held																	A	SF	2R	NH	2R	QF	QF	2R	2R	W	2R	SF	Not Held		2R	Tournament Not Held			

Performance Table Legend
LQ	lost in the qualifying draw	#R	lost in the early rounds of the tournament (WR = Wildcard round, RR = Round robin)	QF	lost in the quarter-finals
SF	lost in the semi-finals	F	lost in the final	W	won the tournament
DNQ	did not qualify for the tournament	A	did not participate in the tournament	WD	withdrew from the tournament
DQ	disqualified from the tournament				

NH / Not Held	event was not held.
NR / Non-Ranking Event	event is/was no longer a ranking event.
R / Ranking Event	event is/was a ranking event.
MR / Minor-Ranking Event	means an event is/was a minor-ranking event.
PA / Pro-am Event	means an event is/was a pro-am event.

== Career finals ==
=== Ranking finals: 45 (27 titles) ===
Legend
World Championship (3–2)
UK Championship (2–2)
Other (22–14)

Outcome	No.	Year	Championship	Opponent in the final	Score	Ref.
Winner	1.	1996	Welsh Open	(England) John Parrott	9–3	
Winner	2.	1996	Grand Prix	(Scotland) Euan Henderson	9–5	
Winner	3.	1997	British Open	(Scotland) Stephen Hendry	9–2	
Winner	4.	1998	Irish Open	(Scotland) Alan McManus	9–4	
Winner	5.	1999	Welsh Open (2)	(Scotland) Stephen Hendry	9–8	
Winner	6.	1999	Thailand Masters	(Scotland) Alan McManus	9–7	
Runner-up	1.	1999	World Snooker Championship	(Scotland) Stephen Hendry	11–18	
Runner-up	2.	1999	Grand Prix	(Scotland) John Higgins	8–9	
Winner	7.	1999	UK Championship	(Wales) Matthew Stevens	10–8	
Runner-up	3.	2000	Malta Grand Prix	(Republic of Ireland) Ken Doherty	3–9	
Winner	8.	2000	Thailand Masters (2)	(Scotland) Stephen Hendry	9–5	
Runner-up	4.	2000	Scottish Open	(England) Ronnie O'Sullivan	1–9	
Winner	9.	2000	World Snooker Championship	(Wales) Matthew Stevens	18–16	
Winner	10.	2000	Grand Prix (2)	(England) Ronnie O'Sullivan	9–5	
Runner-up	5.	2000	UK Championship	(Scotland) John Higgins	4–10	
Runner-up	6.	2000	China Open	(England) Ronnie O'Sullivan	3–9	
Winner	11.	2002	China Open	(England) Anthony Hamilton	9–8	
Winner	12.	2002	Thailand Masters (3)	(England) Stephen Lee	9–4	
Winner	13.	2002	UK Championship (2)	(Republic of Ireland) Ken Doherty	10–9	
Runner-up	7.	2003	Welsh Open	(Scotland) Stephen Hendry	5–9	
Winner	14.	2003	World Snooker Championship (2)	(Republic of Ireland) Ken Doherty	18–16	
Winner	15.	2003	LG Cup (3)	(Scotland) John Higgins	9–5	
Winner	16.	2006	China Open (2)	(Scotland) John Higgins	9–8	
Winner	17.	2010	China Open (3)	(China) Ding Junhui	10–6	
Runner-up	8.	2010	UK Championship (2)	(Scotland) John Higgins	9–10	
Winner	18.	2011	German Masters	(England) Mark Selby	9–7	
Runner-up	9.	2011	Australian Goldfields Open	(England) Stuart Bingham	8–9	
Runner-up	10.	2011	Shanghai Masters	(England) Mark Selby	9–10	
Runner-up	11.	2015	Players Tour Championship Finals	(England) Joe Perry	3–4	
Runner-up	12.	2017	China Open	(England) Mark Selby	8–10	
Winner	19.	2017	Northern Ireland Open	(China) Yan Bingtao	9–8	
Winner	20.	2018	German Masters (2)	(Scotland) Graeme Dott	9–1	
Winner	21.	2018	World Snooker Championship (3)	(Scotland) John Higgins	18–16	
Winner	22.	2018	World Open	(England) David Gilbert	10–9	
Runner-up	13.	2019	China Championship	(England) Shaun Murphy	9–10	
Winner	23.	2021	WST Pro Series	(England) Ali Carter	RR	
Winner	24.	2021	British Open (2)	(England) Gary Wilson	6–4	
Runner-up	14.	2022	Snooker Shoot Out	(Iran) Hossein Vafaei	0–1	
Runner-up	15.	2023	Championship League	(England) Shaun Murphy	0–3	
Winner	25.	2023	British Open (3)	(England) Mark Selby	10–7	
Winner	26.	2024	Tour Championship	(England) Ronnie O'Sullivan	10–5	
Runner-up	16.	2024	Saudi Arabia Snooker Masters	(England) Judd Trump	9–10	
Runner-up	17.	2025	World Snooker Championship (2)	(China) Zhao Xintong	12–18	
Winner	27.	2025	Xi'an Grand Prix	(England) Shaun Murphy	10–3	
Runner-up	18.	2026	English Open	(England) Ali Carter	6–9	

=== Minor-ranking finals: 3 (2 titles) ===
Outcome	No.	Year	Championship	Opponent in the final	Score	Ref.
Winner	1.	2010	Players Tour Championship – Event 1	(Scotland) Stephen Maguire	4–0	
Winner	2.	2013	Rotterdam Open	(England) Mark Selby	4–3	
Runner-up	1.	2015	Gdynia Open	(Australia) Neil Robertson	0–4	

=== Non-ranking finals: 24 (9 titles) ===
Legend
The Masters (2–2)
Champion of Champions (1–0)
Premier League (0–3)
Other (6–10)

Outcome	No.	Year	Championship	Opponent in the final	Score	Ref.
Winner	1.	1994	Benson & Hedges Championship	(England) Rod Lawler	9–5	
Runner-up	1.	1995	WPBSA Minor Tour – Event 6	(Scotland) Drew Henry	5–6	
Winner	2.	1998	The Masters	(Scotland) Stephen Hendry	10–9	
Winner	3.	1998	Pontins Professional	(England) Martin Clark	9–6	
Runner-up	2.	1998	German Masters	(England) John Parrott	4–6	
Runner-up	3.	1999	Champions Cup	(Scotland) Stephen Hendry	5–7	
Runner-up	4.	2000	Premier League	(Scotland) Stephen Hendry	5–9	
Runner-up	5.	2000	Champions Cup (2)	(England) Ronnie O'Sullivan	5–7	
Runner-up	6.	2001	Malta Grand Prix	(Scotland) Stephen Hendry	1–7	
Runner-up	7.	2001	Champions Cup (3)	(Scotland) John Higgins	4–7	
Runner-up	8.	2002	The Masters	(England) Paul Hunter	9–10	
Winner	4.	2003	The Masters (2)	(Scotland) Stephen Hendry	10–4	
Runner-up	9.	2003	Premier League (2)	(Hong Kong) Marco Fu	5–9	
Runner-up	10.	2005	Premier League (3)	(England) Ronnie O'Sullivan	0–6	
Winner	5.	2006	Pot Black	(Scotland) John Higgins	1–0	
Runner-up	11.	2009	Six-red World Championship	(England) Mark Davis	3–6	
Winner	6.	2010	Helsinki Invitational Trophy	(Finland) Robin Hull	6–1	
Runner-up	12.	2015	General Cup	(Hong Kong) Marco Fu	3–7	
Winner	7.	2017	Six-red World Championship	(Thailand) Thepchaiya Un-Nooh	8–2	
Runner-up	13.	2018	Six-red Macau Masters	(England) Barry Hawkins	2–3	
Runner-up	14.	2021	Championship League Invitational	(England) Kyren Wilson	2–3	
Runner-up	15.	2023	The Masters (2)	(England) Judd Trump	8–10	
Winner	8.	2024	Champion of Champions	(China) Xiao Guodong	10–6	
Winner	9.	2025	Helsinki Super Shoot Out	(England) Shaun Murphy	1–0	

=== Seniors finals: 1 (1 title) ===
Outcome	No.	Year	Championship	Opponent in the final	Score	Ref.
Winner	1.	2015	World Seniors Championship	(Republic of Ireland) Fergal O'Brien	2–1	

=== Team finals: 4 (2 titles) ===
Outcome	No.	Year	Championship	Team	Opponent in the final	Score	Ref.
Winner	1.	1999	Nations Cup	Wales	Scotland	6–4	
Runner-up	1.	2000	Nations Cup	Wales	England	4–6	
Winner	2.	2017	CVB Snooker Challenge	Great Britain	China	26–9	
Runner-up	2.	2018	Macau Masters	(England) Joe Perry (Hong Kong) Marco Fu (China) Zhang Anda	(England) Barry Hawkins (Wales) Ryan Day (China) Zhao Xintong (China) Zhou Yuelong	1–5	

=== Pro-am finals: 7 (4 titles) ===
Outcome	No.	Year	Championship	Opponent in the final	Score	Ref.
Winner	1.	1995	Pontins Spring Open	(England) Peter Ebdon	7–4	
Winner	2.	2003	TCC Open Snooker Championship	(Wales) Darren Morgan	6–1	
Winner	3.	2004	TCC Open Snooker Championship (2)	(Wales) Darren Morgan	7–6	
Runner-up	1.	2006	TCC Open Snooker Championship	(Wales) Paul Davies	4–7	
Runner-up	2.	2008	TCC Open Snooker Championship (2)	(Wales) Lee Walker	5–7	
Runner-up	3.	2009	TCC Open Snooker Championship (3)	(Wales) Darren Morgan	4–7	
Winner	4.	2012	Austrian Open	(England) Matthew Couch	6–5	

=== Amateur finals: 10 (5 titles) ===
Outcome	No.	Year	Championship	Opponent in the final	Score	Ref.
Runner-up	1.	1989	Welsh Under-16 Championship	(Wales) Gareth Chilcott	1–3	
Winner	1.	1990	Welsh Under-17 Championship	(Wales) Stephen Evans	3–0	
Runner-up	2.	1990	Pontins Junior Championship	(England) Chris Scanlon	2–3	
Winner	2.	1990	Welsh Under-19 Championship	(Wales) Gareth Chilcott	4–0	
Runner-up	3.	1991	Mita/Sky World Masters – Junior (U16)	(Scotland) John Higgins	1–6	
Winner	3.	1991	Welsh Under-16 Championship	(Wales) Lee Walker	4–1	
Winner	4.	1991	British Under-16 Championship	(Scotland) John Higgins	4–0	
Runner-up	4.	1991	Welsh Under-18 Championship	(Wales) Lee Walker	2–4	
Winner	5.	1991	UK Under-19 Championship	(Northern Ireland) Declan Hughes	4–1	
Runner-up	5.	1992	Welsh Under-18 Championship (2)	(Wales) Matthew Stevens	1–4	
