= 2000 Champions Cup =

Invitational snooker tournament

Tournament information
- Dates: 26 August – 3 September 2000
- Venue: Brighton Centre
- City: Brighton
- Country: England
- Organisation: WPBSA
- Format: Non-ranking event
- Total prize fund: £200,000
- Winner's share: £100,000
- Highest break: Ronnie O'Sullivan (ENG) (140)

Final
- Champion: Ronnie O'Sullivan (ENG)
- Runner-up: Mark Williams (WAL)
- Score: 7–5

The 2000 Champions Cup was a professional invitational snooker tournament which was held from 26 August to 3 September 2000, at the Brighton Centre, in Brighton, East Sussex. The tournament was the first of five World Professional Billiards and Snooker Association (WPBSA) invitational events of the 2000–01 snooker season and the first overall. It preceded the season's second invitational tournament, the 2000 Scottish Masters. There were eight players who competed in the event: seven were major tournament winners from the 1999–2000 season and one was a wild card entry. The competition featured a total prize fund of £200,000, with £100,000 going to the winner.

Ronnie O'Sullivan won the tournament, defeating Mark Williams, the world champion, seven frames to five (7–5) to claim the 17th career professional snooker competition of his career. In the semi-finals, O'Sullivan defeated the reigning holder of the Champions Cup trophy Stephen Hendry 5–2 and Williams beat John Higgins 5–2. O'Sullivan made the highest break of the tournament of 140 in his match against wild card entrant Jimmy White. After the tournament, Stephen Lee was fined £8,500 for testing positive for traces of marijuana in his system during a routine drugs test.

== Background ==
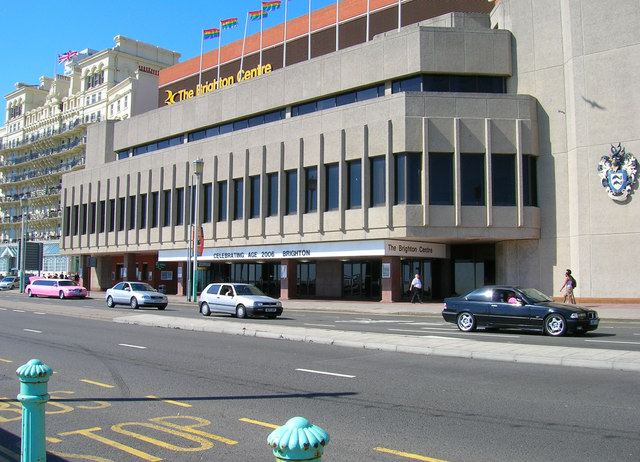
The Brighton Centre, where the tournament was held.

The tournament was first played as the Charity Challenge in 1995. It had the unique distinction of players competing for charity with the prize money being donated to their respective causes. The charity aspect was discarded after five years and the tournament was re-branded the Champions Cup with a new "winner takes all" format of players who won major tournaments from the season prior invited to compete. The 2000 Champions Cup was the first of five World Professional Billiards and Snooker Association (WPBSA) invitational events of the 2000–01 snooker season and was held at the Brighton Centre in Brighton, East Sussex from 26 August to 3 September. The tournament preceded the 2000 Scottish Masters. The Champions Cup had a prize fund of £200,000, and was broadcast in the United Kingdom on ITV.

=== Prize fund ===
The breakdown of prize money for 2000 is shown below.

- Winner: £100,000
- Runner-up: £35,000
- Semi-final (×2): £15,000
- Group stage (×4): £5,000
- Highest break: £5,000
- Maximum break: £20,000
- Total: £200,000

=== Rules ===
A total of seven players who won major tournaments in the 1999–2000 season and one wild card selected by ITV competed in the Champions Cup. All group stage matches were part of a round-robin format and all games were best-of-9 frames until the final which was best-of-13 frames. Entrants were drawn into two groups of four and played one match against the other three in their group. The overall winner of both groups was determined by the number of matches won. In the event of a draw, the number of frames won decided the group winner. If this method proved ineffective, a match between the tied players would occur. The winner of each group was drawn to play the runner-up of the opposite group in the semi-finals.

Method of qualification
Tournament	Date of tournament final	Winner
1999 Millennium Cup	25 July 1999	Stephen Lee (ENG)
1999 Champions Cup	9 September 1999	Stephen Hendry (SCO)
1999 British Open	19 September 1999	Stephen Hendry (SCO)
1999 Scottish Masters	3 October 1999	Matthew Stevens (WAL)
1999 Grand Prix	24 October 1999	John Higgins (SCO)
1999 UK Championship	28 November 1999	Mark Williams (WAL)
1999 China Open	19 December 1999	Ronnie O'Sullivan (ENG)
2000 Welsh Open	30 January 2000	John Higgins (SCO)
2000 Malta Grand Prix	27 February 2000	Ken Doherty (IRL)
2000 Thailand Masters	11 March 2000	Mark Williams (WAL)
2000 Irish Masters	26 March 2000	John Higgins (SCO)
2000 Scottish Open	9 April 2000	Ronnie O'Sullivan (ENG)
2000 World Snooker Championship	1 May 2000	Mark Williams (WAL)
2000 Premier League Snooker	6 May 2000	Stephen Hendry (SCO)
ITV wild card	N/A	Jimmy White (ENG)

== Tournament summary ==
=== Group stages ===
==== Group A ====
The 12 best-of-9 frame group stage games occurred between 27 August to 1 September. Mark Williams, the world champion who was recovering from a left thumb injury after being bitten several times by his pet rottweiler at his Cwm home, played the tournament's first match against Ken Doherty from Ireland. Doherty forced a final frame decider after coming from 2–0 and 4–2 behind but his chance of victory was gone by missing a challenging yellow ball and Williams won the match five frames to four (5–4). The defending Champions Cup holder Stephen Hendry faced Millennium Cup winner Stephen Lee in a three-hour opening match. Lee took the first two frames and Hendry responded by winning four successive frames with consecutive half-centuries. Lee went level at 4–4 to force a final fame decider that Hendry won with a break of 53.

Hendry led early in his match against Doherty with a score of 69–0 until the latter took a 2–1 lead with a break of 66 in the third frame. Hendry equalled the scoreline with a break of 87 until Doherty retook the advantage with the next two frames. Hendry responded by winning the following two frames after that. The final frame was won by Hendry for a 5–4 victory and he entered the semi-final. Williams's second match ended in a 5–3 victory over Lee and stopped his opponent from qualifying for the semi-finals. Doherty finished third in the group after beating Lee 5–3. It had been anticipated that Doherty would come fourth because he trailed Lee 3–1 after the latter compiled breaks of 92, 89 and 102 but Doherty recovered from his performance dip to win the game. Hendry compiled a break of 114 en route to defeating Williams 5–3. Post-match, Hendry said he was demotivated since he was aware he and Williams had already attained qualification for the semi-finals.

==== Group B ====
In his first match since spending five weeks mid-year at the Priory Hospital to treat a bout of depression, Ronnie O'Sullivan defeated John Higgins 5–4 in a tightly fought match that lasted until late in the night on 28 August. O'Sullivan took 79 minutes to defeat wild card entrant Jimmy White 5–2 to give himself an opportunity to qualify for the semi-finals. O'Sullivan began the match with a 140 total clearance and White responded to this by levelling the scoreline 2–2. Further breaks of 102, 107 in the fifth and sixth frames and a clearance of 65 from O'Sullivan in frame seven secured him the victory. Higgins went up against Masters champion Matthew Stevens, winning 5–4. Higgins' first break of 98 in the first frame and individual breaks 30 and 32 gave him the win. After the match, Higgins spoke of his unhappiness over his form and him having half an inch added to his cue to rectify this.

Stevens began his match against O'Sullivan with him opening out a 2–1 lead which was nullified when O'Sullivan won the fourth frame. From that point on, O'Sullivan took 33 minutes that had him compile break of 70 to win frame five and took the sixth away from Stevens after he missed an unsteady green ball that was on the edge of a corner pocket and it prevented him from winning that frame. O'Sullivan was unchallenged in the seventh frame and won the match 5–2 to guarantee himself a semi-finals berth. White's next opponent was Stevens. White was 3–1 behind but pulled level with Stevens to 3–3. Victory in the next two frames gave Stevens the match. White conceded to the media shortly after his defeat that his chance of winning the tournament was non-existent after vowing in the days prior to its commencement to be its next champion. For Stevens to qualify for the semi-finals, White needed to whitewash Higgins or win 5–1. Higgins led the match from the beginning to win 5–1 with two breaks of 64 and a third at 54.

=== Knockout rounds ===
==== Semi-finals ====
Williams and Higgins played the first semi-final on 1 September. Leading 4–2, it appeared that Williams would win the match easily by getting a snookered brown ball in the seventh frame. However, Williams missed the brown ball and allowed Higgins to pot it and the blue ball to win the frame. Higgins made a break of 110 to force a final frame decider that Williams won 5–4 with a game-victory clearance of 31 to continue his unbeaten run in the tournament. Williams said after the match, "A few years ago John used to beat me on a regular basis but gradually I've been getting the upper hand. I don't think either of us played that well. But one of my strengths these days is that I can win when I'm not at my best." Higgins confessed that he had not been focused on the tournament as he was due to marry his long-term fiancée in December 2000, "'I'm sure my focus will be back. I've never done all that well right at the start of the season."

The second semi-final happened between Hendry and O'Sullivan on 2 September. Hendry scored his 507th career century break (105) to level at 5–2 before O'Sullivan took the lead after Hendry missed his shot on the green ball. That allowed O'Sullivan to clear from the green to pink balls and extend his lead by one frame. Subsequent breaks of 46 and 30 won O'Sullivan the match 5–2. Post-match, Hendry complimented O'Sullivan, "I missed a couple of balls but I thought Ronnie played very well." O'Sullivan said, "I'm just trying to get myself right mentally and get to handle some of the situations that come through being a professional sportsman. For me, Mark, Stephen and John Higgins are the top three, and I'm the slight underdog against them. They've got the consistency but it's on the day, whoever hits top form. The main thing for me is that life's more enjoyable. I'm enjoying breathing. Every day's a bonus."

===== Final =====
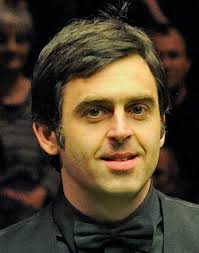
Ronnie O'Sullivan (pictured in 2015) won the 17th professional snooker tournament of his career with a 7–5 win over Mark Williams.

The best-of-13 frame final occurred on 3 September. Williams was ill with overnight food poisoning but began by taking the first two frames with breaks of 67 and 77 as O'Sullivan did not pot a ball during this period. The third frame fell to O'Sullivan's favour with a break of 66. Williams took a ten-minute respite to seek medical treatment after frame three was over. He returned to the arena to win frames four and five at 68–36 and 78–45. When play resumed after the interval, O'Sullivan compiled breaks of 51, 78 and 95 to secure the following two frames as Williams did not hit a single ball. O'Sullivan won the eighth frame and added the next after being 45–0 down within 50 minutes. Williams' condition deteriorated but he levelled at 5–5. In frame 11, Williams made a break of 27 but missed a red ball down the side cushion while using the rest. It allowed O'Sullivan to accumulate breaks of 77 and a quickly-compiled 91 to win the match 7–5.

It was O'Sullivan's second Champions Cup victory after the 1996 edition and the 17th tournament win of his career. The victory earned him £100,000 prize money and a further £5,000 for scoring the tournament's highest break (140). Post-match, O'Sullivan spoke of his emotions over his success which he dedicated to those who helped him during his recovery process, "I have been through a lot of stuff in the last couple of months. But I've got my life back in order now. The public will see a different side of me from now on. At 24 I've started my life again. In the past I've been on a treadmill of turmoil but I am going to soak up this victory and enjoy it." Williams said of his defeat to O'Sullivan, "I was suffering from food poisoning of some sort, but that's no excuse. Ronnie played well and I was beaten by the better player."

== Drugs testing ==
Lee was found to have tested positive for traces of the banned substance marijuana in his system at a routine urine test conducted during the tournament on 28 August. He was asked to meet the WPBSA disciplinary committee at the governing body's headquarters in Bristol on 14 November to establish whether he had violated its rules on drugs taking. Complicated legal and scientific arguments forced the postponement of the inquiry until 7 January 2001. The inquiry accepted that Lee did not use marijuana to better his performance and instructed him to relinquish £7,500 prize money and pay £1,000 costs.

== Results ==
The players highlighted in bold text in the table indicate who progressed to the semi-finals. Players in bold to the right of the tables denote match winners.

=== Group A ===
Group A final table
POS	Player	MP	MW	FW	FL	FD	PTS
1	**Mark Williams** (WAL)	3	3	15	10	+5	3
2	**Stephen Hendry** (SCO)	3	2	13	13	0	2
3	Ken Doherty (IRL)	3	1	13	13	0	1
4	Stephen Lee (ENG)	3	0	10	15	−5	0

- (Wales) **Mark Williams 5**–3 Stephen Lee (England)
- (Scotland) **Stephen Hendry 5**–4 Ken Doherty (Republic of Ireland)
- (Scotland) **Stephen Hendry 5**–4 Stephen Lee (England)
- (Wales) **Mark Williams 5**–4 Ken Doherty (Republic of Ireland)
- (Republic of Ireland) **Ken Doherty 5**–3 Stephen Lee (England)
- (Wales) **Mark Williams 5**–3 Stephen Hendry (Scotland)

=== Group B ===
Final Group B table
POS	Player	MP	MW	FW	FL	FD	PTS
1	**Ronnie O'Sullivan** (ENG)	3	3	15	8	+7	3
2	**John Higgins** (SCO)	3	2	14	10	+4	2
3	Matthew Stevens (WAL)	3	1	11	13	−2	1
4	Jimmy White (ENG)	3	0	6	15	−9	0

- (Wales) **Matthew Stevens 5**–3 Jimmy White (England)
- (England) **Ronnie O'Sullivan 5**–4 John Higgins (Scotland)
- (Scotland) **John Higgins 5**–1 Jimmy White (England)
- (England) **Ronnie O'Sullivan 5**–2 Matthew Stevens (Wales)
- (England) **Ronnie O'Sullivan 5**–2 Jimmy White (England)
- (Scotland) **John Higgins 5**–4 Matthew Stevens (Wales)

=== Knockout draw ===
Players in bold indicate match winners.

Semi-finals; Best of 9 frames
(England) **Ronnie O'Sullivan**	**5**
(Scotland) Stephen Hendry	2
(Wales) **Mark Williams**	**5**
(Scotland) John Higgins	4

Final; Best of 13 frames
(England) **Ronnie O'Sullivan**	**7**
(Wales) Mark Williams	5
