= Champions Cup (snooker) =

Snooker tournament held in England

Tournament information
- Venue: Brighton Centre
- Location: Brighton
- Country: England
- Established: 1995
- Organisation(s): World Professional Billiards and Snooker Association
- Format: Non-ranking event
- Final year: 2001
- Final champion: (Scotland) John Higgins

The Champions Cup was a professional non-ranking snooker tournament held in England that ran for eight seasons starting in the 1994/1995 season and was originally known as the Charity Challenge. The last champion was John Higgins.

== History ==
The tournament was originally called the Charity Challenge. The event was unique by having the players compete for charity, with the prize money being donated to their respective causes. The event started in the 1994/1995 season and was contested by a 16-man field, but was reduced to an 8-man field by the 1996/1997 season. The event is most notable for Stephen Hendry compiling a maximum break in the deciding frame of the 1997 final against Ronnie O'Sullivan. It is the only time that a maximum break has been made in the deciding frame of a final in professional competition.

After five seasons the charity aspect was dropped and replaced with a new format. The event was re-branded the Champions Cup and was contested by the players, who won major tournaments in the previous season. In its inaugural year it adopted a “winner takes all” format with a £175,000 prize going to the winner, with the other contestants receiving nothing. The winner's prize was the second highest after the World Championship. In subsequent years the event had a more conventional prize money schedule.

The tournament was sponsored by Liverpool Victoria for all but the last two events. In 2000 the event was sponsored by TVN and there was no sponsor in 2001. The event was broadcast on ITV, but was dropped from the calendar after the 2001 event due to ITV discontinuing its snooker coverage.

== Winners ==
| Year | Winner | Runner-up | Final score | Season |
Charity Challenge
| 1995 | (Scotland) Stephen Hendry | (Northern Ireland) Dennis Taylor | 9–1 | 1994/1995 |
| 1996 | (England) Ronnie O'Sullivan | (Scotland) John Higgins | 9–6 | 1995/1996 |
| 1997 | (Scotland) Stephen Hendry | (England) Ronnie O'Sullivan | 9–8 | 1996/1997 |
| 1998 | (Scotland) John Higgins | (England) Ronnie O'Sullivan | 9–8 | 1997/1998 |
| 1999 | (Scotland) John Higgins | (England) Ronnie O'Sullivan | 9–4 | 1998/1999 |
Champions Cup
| 1999 | (Scotland) Stephen Hendry | (Wales) Mark Williams | 7–5 | 1999/2000 |
| 2000 | (England) Ronnie O'Sullivan | (Wales) Mark Williams | 7–5 | 2000/2001 |
| 2001 | (Scotland) John Higgins | (Wales) Mark Williams | 7–4 | 2001/2002 |

== See also ==
- Champion of Champions (snooker)
