= 2001 Malta Grand Prix =

Snooker tournament

Malta Grand Prix
Tournament information
- Dates: 21–25 February 2001
- Venue: Mediterranean Conference Centre
- City: Valletta
- Country: Malta
- Format: Non-ranking event
- Total prize fund: £36,000
- Winner's share: £10,000
- Highest break: Stephen Hendry (SCO) (147)

Final
- Champion: Stephen Hendry (SCO)
- Runner-up: Mark Williams (WAL)
- Score: 7–1

The 2001 Malta Grand Prix (officially the 2001 Rothmans Malta Grand Prix) was a professional snooker tournament held at the Mediterranean Conference Centre in Valletta, Malta, from 21 to 25 February 2001. It was the seventh and last Malta Grand Prix, and the fourth of the five World Professional Billiards and Snooker Association invitational competitions in the 2000–01 snooker season. It preceded the season's antepenultimate invitational event, the 2001 Masters. The event featured 12 players and was played as a round-robin format until the semi-finals.

Ken Doherty was the defending champion of the tournament having defeated Mark Williams nine frames to three (9–3) in the final of the 2000 event but was eliminated from the group stages after finishing second in his group. Stephen Hendry won the competition, beating Williams 7–1 in the final. It was the 69th tournament that Hendry had won and he earned £10,000 from a prize pool of £36,000. In the semi-finals, Hendry defeated fellow Scot John Higgins 6–4 and Williams also beat Fergal O'Brien 6–4. Hendry made a maximum break in the third frame of the final, the highest of the tournament and the 42nd maximum in professional play.

== Background ==
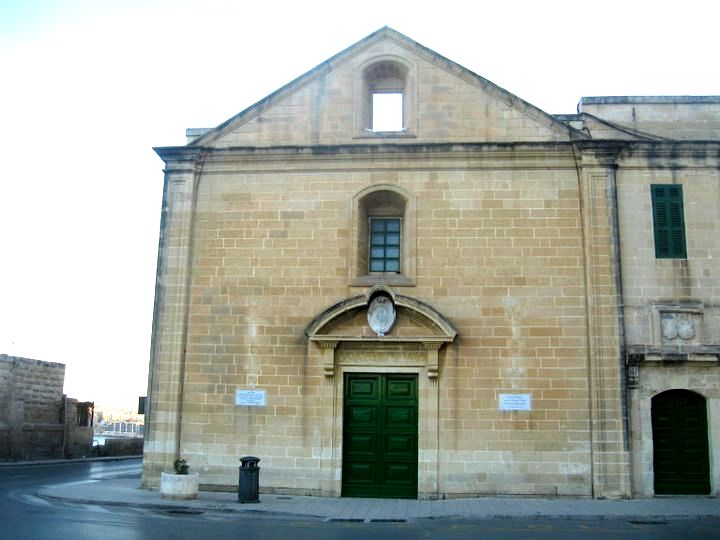
The Mediterranean Conference Centre (pictured in 2013) where the competition was held

The Malta Grand Prix was created by Snooker Promotions (Malta) founders Richard Balani, Wilfred Sultana and Joe Zammit in 1994 as a 12-player competition. It was Malta's first major professional snooker event. The event was non-ranking for most of its history except for the 2000 tournament. The 2001 tournament was the fourth of the five World Professional Billiards and Snooker Association invitational events in the 2000–01 snooker season, and was the seventh Malta Grand Prix, It was held at the Mediterranean Conference Centre, Valletta, between 21 and 25 February 2001, and preceded the 2001 Masters. Sponsored by the cigarette manufacturer Rothmans, it had a total prize fund of £36,000, with £10,000 going to the winner.

A total of 12 players including 3 from Malta were invited to enter the competition. Maltese players Alex Borg, Tony Drago and Joe Grech as well as Ken Doherty, Stephen Hendry, John Higgins, Paul Hunter, Stephen Lee, Fergal O'Brien, Matthew Stevens, Joe Swail and Mark Williams participated in the tournament. Ronnie O'Sullivan, a three-time ranking winner in the 2000–01 season, withdrew due to a reoccurring back injury while Marco Fu also withdrew for family reasons, leading O'Brien and Hunter to replace them. Players were put into four groups of three, with each group winner qualifying for the semi-finals. The maximum number of frames in a match increased from 9 in the group stages to 11 in the semi-final, leading up to the final, which was best-of-13 frames.

== Group stages ==
=== Groups A and B ===
The twelve best-of-nine frame group stage matches took place from 21 to 23 February. Group A was composed of Borg, Doherty and Higgins. In his first match since losing to O'Brien in the quarter-finals of the 2001 Masters, world number seven and the tournament's defending champion Doherty made breaks of 115, 73, 131, 77 and 79 to defeat Borg 5–1. Higgins outscored Borg 449 to 111 as he whitewashed Borg 5–0 with breaks of 83, 81, 77 and 73. The final match of the group saw Higgins play Doherty. Higgins won three of the first five frames with Doherty securing frames three and five for a 3–2 score. Higgins won frames six and seven to progress to the semi-finals with a 5–2 win.

Grech, Hendry and Stevens played in Group B. Grech led 3–0 in the match against Stevens but the latter made breaks of 80, 62, 54, 46 and 43 to win 5–3. During the eighth frame, the electrical cables attached to the television lighting rig some 50 ft (15 m) above the players snapped and swung across the table, causing Stevens, who was about to strike the pink ball, to seek cover. While the cables did not cause any damage, play was suspended because they needed to be reattached to their couplings. Hendry produced his 19th century break of the season and the 524th of his career in the fifth frame of his 5–1 victory over Grech. The following day, Hendry made breaks of 118 and 67 to defeat Stevens 5–3 and qualify for the semi-finals.

=== Groups C and D ===
Group C was made up of O'Brien, Lee and Swail. O'Brien won the match's first group 5–3 over Swail. Lee, the world number five, won 5–3 over Swail and needed to beat O'Brien to go through to the semi-finals. The final match of Group C saw O'Brien win the first frame on a 112 break before Lee took the next two. The next four frames were shared between both players. O'Brien took the eighth to force a final frame decider that he won with a break of 59 for a 5–4 victory and entry to the semi-finals.

Drago, Hunter and Williams were drawn in Group D. Hunter was defeated 5–3 by Drago following breaks of 65, 47 and 40 from the latter after he lost the first frame on the black ball. Drago said post-match: "It wasn't a full house out there but the expectations for me these days are not good because I have fallen down the rankings and I haven't done all that well for a few years". Williams won 5–2 over Hunter and commented that he could not score heavily due to bouncing on the cushions and had difficulty controlling the cue ball. Williams claimed the final frames of his match against Drago with breaks of 54, 65, 45, 43 and 36 to win the last semi-final spot 5–2.

== Knockout rounds ==
=== Semi-finals ===
The two semi-finals were played on 23 and 24 February. Hendry and Higgins played in the first semi-final. The lead was 2–0 to Hendry, which he made 4–2 and later 5–3. Higgins was unable to force a final frame decider when he missed the brown ball to win the tenth frame and tie the score at 5–5. Hendry took the tenth frame 63–62 to win the match 6–4 and the final's first berth. Hendry, who had qualified for his 90th career final, said: "I played OK in patches then missed an easy one, something you can't afford to do at this level. But a win is a win and while capturing ranking event titles is what I'm after, I'll be happy to lift this trophy as it's been a long time since I won anything."

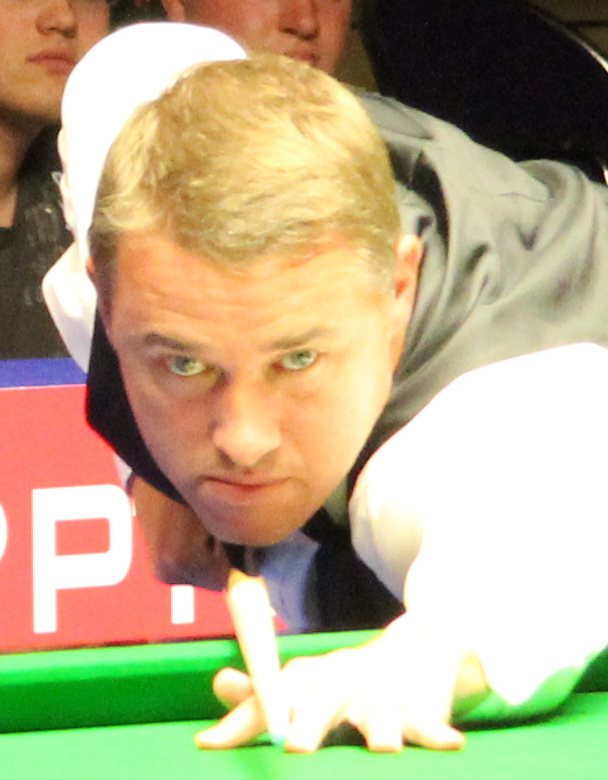
Stephen Hendry (pictured in 2011) won the 69th tournament of his career with a 7–1 victory over Mark Williams.

The other semi-final was between O'Brien and Williams. The first frame was won by Williams and O'Brien took the next four to lead 4–1. Williams changed his playing style midway through the match as he was unsteady as a result of him jabbing and snatching. Errors from O'Brien stopped him winning frames eight and nine, before missing the final red ball to lead 5–4, allowing Williams to win the tenth frame with a clearance of 31 to the black ball to win 6–4 and the second spot in the final. Williams reached his second final of the season and commented on his playing style: "To do that is ludicrous but that shows how my head went. I was disgusted with myself but jabbing and snatching at everything seemed to work so I'll be sticking with that against Stephen."

=== Final ===
The best-of-13 frames final between Hendry and Williams was held on the evening of 25 February. Williams won the first frame on a break of 42, and finished with a score of 75–20. Hendry took the next six frames with breaks of 57, 70, 56, 41 and 87 and potted the black in the eighth to win the match 7–1. He also achieved a maximum break in the third frame for the highest break. Hendry made his eighth maximum, and his third in a major tournament final. (Note: The other two finals that Hendry made maximum breaks in were the 1997 Charity Challenge and the 1999 British Open.) It was the third overseas maximum, the first in a European competition away from Great Britain and Ireland, and professional snooker's 42nd maximum.

Hendry earned £10,000 prize money for winning the tournament and £1,000 for making a maximum break. It was the 69th tournament win of his career, and his first since the 2000 Premier League. Hendry commented on the win: "People will say this is only a small tournament but just to be in the winner's circle again is a good feeling." He went on to talk about his maximum break: "As for the maximum, I fancied it from the word go, the balls were perfectly placed by the time the break reached eight and it was then a great opportunity to go all the way. I was never in any trouble at all." Willams, who won £5,000 as runner-up, said of his loss: "I was never in the match. I tried to win but there was nothing there and Stephen deserved to beat me." He conceded that "I'm getting used to a good pummelling" after losing the finals of the UK Championship to Higgins and the China Open to O'Sullivan earlier in the season.

== Results ==
The players highlighted in bold text in the table indicate who progressed to the semi-finals. Players in bold to the right of the tables denote match winners.

=== Group A ===
Group A final table
| POS | Player | MP | MW | ML | FW | FL | FD | PTS |
|---|---|---|---|---|---|---|---|---|
| 1 | **John Higgins** (SCO) | 2 | 2 | 0 | 10 | 2 | +8 | 2 |
| 2 | Ken Doherty (IRL) | 2 | 1 | 1 | 7 | 6 | +1 | 1 |
| 3 | Alex Borg (MLT) | 2 | 0 | 2 | 1 | 10 | −9 | 0 |

- (Scotland) **John Higgins 5**–0 Alex Borg (Malta)
- (Republic of Ireland) **Ken Doherty 5**–1 Alex Borg (Malta)
- (Scotland) **John Higgins 5**–2 Ken Doherty (Republic of Ireland)

=== Group B ===
Group B final table
| POS | Player | MP | MW | ML | FW | FL | FD | PTS |
|---|---|---|---|---|---|---|---|---|
| 1 | **Stephen Hendry** (SCO) | 2 | 2 | 0 | 10 | 4 | +6 | 2 |
| 2 | Matthew Stevens (WAL) | 2 | 1 | 1 | 8 | 8 | 0 | 1 |
| 3 | Joe Grech (MLT) | 2 | 0 | 2 | 4 | 10 | −6 | 0 |

- (Scotland) **Stephen Hendry 5**–1 Joe Grech (Malta)
- (Wales) **Matthew Stevens 5**–3 Joe Grech (Malta)
- (Scotland) **Stephen Hendry 5**–3 Matthew Stevens (Wales)

=== Group C ===
Group C final table
| POS | Player | MP | MW | ML | FW | FL | FD | PTS |
|---|---|---|---|---|---|---|---|---|
| 1 | **Fergal O'Brien** (IRL) | 2 | 2 | 0 | 10 | 7 | +3 | 2 |
| 2 | Stephen Lee (ENG) | 2 | 1 | 1 | 9 | 8 | +1 | 1 |
| 3 | Joe Swail (NIR) | 2 | 0 | 2 | 6 | 10 | −5 | 0 |

- (England) **Stephen Lee 5**–3 Joe Swail (Northern Ireland)
- (Republic of Ireland) **Fergal O'Brien 5**–3 Joe Swail (Northern Ireland)
- (England) Stephen Lee 4–**5 Fergal O'Brien** (Republic of Ireland)

=== Group D ===
Group D final table
| POS | Player | MP | MW | ML | FW | FL | FD | PTS |
|---|---|---|---|---|---|---|---|---|
| 1 | **Mark Williams** (WAL) | 2 | 2 | 0 | 10 | 4 | +6 | 2 |
| 2 | Tony Drago (MLT) | 2 | 1 | 1 | 7 | 8 | −1 | 1 |
| 3 | Paul Hunter (ENG) | 2 | 0 | 2 | 5 | 10 | −5 | 0 |

- (Wales) **Mark Williams 5**–2 Tony Drago (Malta)
- (England) Paul Hunter 3–**5 Tony Drago** (Malta)
- (Wales) **Mark Williams 5**–2 Paul Hunter (England)

=== Knockout draw ===
Players in bold indicate match winners.

Semi-finals; Best of 11 frames
(Scotland) **Stephen Hendry** | **6**
(Scotland) John Higgins | 4
(Wales) **Mark Williams** | **6**
(Republic of Ireland) Fergal O'Brien | 4

Final; Best of 13 frames
(Scotland) **Stephen Hendry** | **7**
(Wales) Mark Williams | 1

=== Final ===
The bold text in the table indicates all of the winning frame scores and the winning player. Breaks over 50 are displayed in brackets.

Final: Best of 13 frames. Mediterranean Conference Centre, Valletta, Malta, 25 February 2001.
| Mark Williams; Wales | 1–**7** | **Stephen Hendry**; Scotland |
Evening: **75**–20, 41–**74** (**57**), 0–**147** (**147**), 35–**79** (**70**), 46–**61** (**56**), 17–**70**, 7–**87** (**87**), 50–**57**
| 42 | Highest break | 147 |
| 0 | Century breaks | **1** |
| 0 | 50+ breaks | **5** |

== Century breaks ==
The 2001 Malta Grand Prix featured a total of seven century breaks between three players. The highest break was a maximum recorded by Hendry in the third frame of the final with Williams.

- 147, 118, 118, 100 Stephen Hendry
- 131, 115 Ken Doherty
- 112 Fergal O'Brien
