= 2017 Six-red World Championship =

Six-red World Championship
Tournament information
- Dates: 4–9 September 2017
- Venue: Bangkok Convention Center
- City: Bangkok
- Country: Thailand
- Organisation: WPBSA
- Total prize fund: 10,000,000 baht
- Winner's share: 3,500,000 baht
- Highest break: (Thailand) Noppon Saengkham (75) (England) Stuart Bingham (75) (Note: A maximum break in six-red snooker is 75)

Final
- Champion: (Wales) Mark Williams
- Runner-up: (Thailand) Thepchaiya Un-Nooh
- Score: 8–2

The 2017 SangSom Six-red World Championship was a six-red snooker invitational tournament held between 4 and 9 September 2017 at the Bangkok Convention Center in Bangkok, Thailand. The tournament was reduced from 48 players to 32.

Ding Junhui was the defending champion, but he lost 1–6 to Marco Fu in the last 16.

Mark Williams won the title, beating Thepchaiya Un-Nooh 8–2 in the final.

== Prize money ==
The breakdown of prize money for this year is shown below:

- Winner: 3,500,000 baht
- Runner-up: 1,300,000 baht
- Semi-finalists: 750,000 baht
- Quarter-finalists: 375,000 baht
- Last 16: 150,000 baht
- Third in Group: 75,000 baht
- Fourth in Group: 50,000 baht
- Total: 10,000,000 baht

== Round-robin stage ==
The top two players from each group qualified for the knock-out stage. All matches were best of 9 frames.

=== Group A ===
POS	Player	MP	MW	FW	FL	FD	PTS
1	(Thailand) Noppon Saengkham	3	3	15	6	+9	3
2	(China) Ding Junhui	3	2	11	10	+1	2
3	(England) Tom Ford	3	1	11	12	−1	1
4	(China) Lyu Haotian	3	0	6	15	−9	0

- Ding Junhui 1–5 Noppon Saengkham
- Lyu Haotian 2–5 Tom Ford
- Noppon Saengkham 5–4 Tom Ford
- Ding Junhui 5–3 Lyu Haotian
- Ding Junhui 5–2 Tom Ford
- Noppon Saengkham 5–1 Lyu Haotian

=== Group B ===
POS	Player	MP	MW	FW	FL	FD	PTS
1	(Scotland) Anthony McGill	3	3	15	9	+6	3
2	(Wales) Ryan Day	3	1	11	10	+1	1
3	(Thailand) Passakorn Suwannawat	3	1	10	12	−2	1
4	(Pakistan) Muhammad Sajjad	3	1	6	11	−5	1

- Anthony McGill 5–4 Passakorn Suwannawat
- Muhammad Sajjad 0–5 Ryan Day
- Passakorn Suwannawat 5–2 Ryan Day
- Anthony McGill 5–1 Muhammad Sajjad
- Passakorn Suwannawat 1–5 Muhammad Sajjad
- Anthony McGill 5–4 Ryan Day

=== Group C ===
POS	Player	MP	MW	FW	FL	FD	PTS
1	(Thailand) Thepchaiya Un-Nooh	3	2	12	10	+2	2
2	(England) Kyren Wilson	3	2	13	11	+2	2
3	(Iceland) Kristján Helgason	3	1	10	11	−1	1
4	(England) Ricky Walden	3	1	9	12	−3	1

- Kyren Wilson 3–5 Thepchaiya Un-Nooh
- Kristján Helgason 5–1 Ricky Walden
- Thepchaiya Un-Nooh 2–5 Ricky Walden
- Kyren Wilson 5–3 Kristján Helgason
- Kyren Wilson 5–3 Ricky Walden
- Thepchaiya Un-Nooh 5–2 Kristján Helgason

=== Group D ===
POS	Player	MP	MW	FW	FL	FD	PTS
1	(China) Liang Wenbo	3	2	13	6	+7	2
2	(England) Michael Holt	3	2	10	8	+2	2
3	(England) Mark Davis	3	1	10	13	−3	1
4	(Thailand) Atthasit Mahitthi	3	1	7	13	−6	1

- Atthasit Mahitthi 1–5 Michael Holt
- Liang Wenbo 3–5 Mark Davis
- Liang Wenbo 5–1 Atthasit Mahitthi
- Mark Davis 2–5 Michael Holt
- Liang Wenbo 5–0 Michael Holt
- Atthasit Mahitthi 5–3 Mark Davis

=== Group E ===
POS	Player	MP	MW	FW	FL	FD	PTS
1	(Thailand) Sunny Akani	3	2	11	8	+3	2
2	(England) Stuart Bingham	3	2	11	8	+3	2
3	(Scotland) Stephen Maguire	3	2	11	10	+1	2
4	(India) Kamal Chawla	3	0	8	15	−7	0

- Sunny Akani 1–5 Stephen Maguire
- Stuart Bingham 5–2 Kamal Chawla
- Kamal Chawla 4–5 Stephen Maguire
- Stuart Bingham 1–5 Sunny Akani
- Stuart Bingham 5–1 Stephen Maguire
- Sunny Akani 5–2 Kamal Chawla

=== Group F ===
POS	Player	MP	MW	FW	FL	FD	PTS
1	(Wales) Mark Willams	3	3	15	7	+8	3
2	(England) Mark King	3	2	13	12	+1	2
3	(Thailand) James Wattana	3	1	12	10	+2	1
4	(Iran) Soheil Vahedi	3	0	4	15	−11	0

- James Wattana 4–5 Mark King
- Mark Williams 5–1 Soheil Vahedi
- Soheil Vahedi 3–5 Mark King
- Mark Williams 5–3 James Wattana
- Mark Williams 5–3 Mark King
- James Wattana 5–0 Soheil Vahedi

=== Group G ===
POS	Player	MP	MW	FW	FL	FD	PTS
1	(Scotland) Graeme Dott	3	3	15	2	+13	3
2	(England) David Gilbert	3	2	11	12	−1	2
3	(England) Martin Gould	3	1	10	11	−1	1
4	(Hong Kong) Andy Lee	3	0	4	15	−11	0

- Graeme Dott 5–1 David Gilbert
- Martin Gould 5–1 Andy Lee
- Martin Gould 4–5 David Gilbert
- Graeme Dott 5–0 Andy Lee
- Andy Lee 3–5 David Gilbert
- Martin Gould 1–5 Graeme Dott

=== Group H ===
POS	Player	MP	MW	FW	FL	FD	PTS
1	(Hong Kong) Marco Fu	3	2	13	9	+4	2
2	(England) Ben Woollaston	3	2	12	11	+1	2
3	(Wales) Michael White	3	1	10	12	−2	1
4	(Wales) Darren Morgan	3	1	10	13	−3	1

- Ben Woollaston 2–5 Michael White
- Marco Fu 5–2 Darren Morgan
- Marco Fu 5–2 Michael White
- Ben Woollaston 5–3 Darren Morgan
- Marco Fu 3–5 Ben Woollaston
- Darren Morgan 5–3 Michael White

== Knockout stage ==
Last 16; Best of 11 frames
(Thailand) Noppon Saengkham	5
(England) David Gilbert	6
(Scotland) Anthony McGill	6
(England) Mark King	5
(Thailand) Thepchaiya Un-Nooh	6
(England) Stuart Bingham	5
(China) Liang Wenbo	6
(England) Ben Woollaston	3
(Thailand) Sunny Akani	2
(England) Michael Holt	6
(Wales) Mark Williams	6
(England) Kyren Wilson	3
(Scotland) Graeme Dott	6
(Wales) Ryan Day	5
(Hong Kong) Marco Fu	6
(China) Ding Junhui	1

Quarter-finals; Best of 11 frames
(England) David Gilbert	4
(Scotland) Anthony McGill	6
(Thailand) Thepchaiya Un-Nooh	6
(China) Liang Wenbo	4
(England) Michael Holt	2
(Wales) Mark Williams	6
(Scotland) Graeme Dott	5
(Hong Kong) Marco Fu	6

Semi-finals; Best of 13 frames
(Scotland) Anthony McGill	3
(Thailand) Thepchaiya Un-Nooh	7
(Wales) Mark Williams	7
(Hong Kong) Marco Fu	3

Final; Best of 15 frames
(Thailand) Thepchaiya Un-Nooh	2
(Wales) Mark Williams	8

== Final ==
Final: Best of 15 frames. Referee: ? Bangkok Convention Center, Bangkok, Thailand, 9 September 2017.
Thepchaiya Un-Nooh; Thailand	2–8	Mark Williams; Wales
71–0 (71), 0–49, 1–55, 37–32, 0–39, 9–38, 0–54, 0–50 (50), 6–49, 15–43
71	Highest break	50
1	50+ breaks	1

== Maximum breaks ==
(Note: A maximum break in six-red snooker is 75.)

- Noppon Saengkham
- Stuart Bingham
