= 1999 Champions Cup =

Tournament information
- Dates: 28 August – 5 September 1999
- Venue: Fairfield Halls
- City: Croydon
- Country: England
- Organisation: WPBSA
- Format: Non-ranking event
- Total prize fund: £175,000
- Winner's share: £175,000

Final
- Champion: (Scotland) Stephen Hendry
- Runner-up: (Wales) Mark Williams
- Score: 7–5

The 1999 Liverpool Victoria Champions Cup was a professional invitational snooker tournament which took place from August to September 1999 in Croydon, England. It featured players who had won tournaments the previous season.

Stephen Hendry won the event, beating Mark Williams 7–5 in the final, netting the £175,000 prize fund. Only the champion won any prize money, as part of a "winner takes all" format.

== Group stage ==
=== Group A ===
| POS | Player | MP | MW | FW | FL | FD | PTS |
|---|---|---|---|---|---|---|---|
| 1 | (England) Ronnie O'Sullivan | 4 | 3 | 13 | 7 | +6 | 3 |
| 2 | (Scotland) John Higgins | 4 | 3 | 12 | 12 | 0 | 3 |
| 3 | (Republic of Ireland) Fergal O'Brien | 4 | 2 | 12 | 12 | 0 | 2 |
| 4 | (England) Jimmy White | 4 | 1 | 11 | 12 | −1 | 1 |
| 5 | (England) John Parrott | 4 | 1 | 8 | 13 | −5 | 1 |

- (England) Ronnie O'Sullivan 4–0 John Higgins (Scotland)
- (England) Jimmy White 4–0 John Parrott (England)
- (England) Ronnie O'Sullivan 4–1 Fergal O'Brien (Republic of Ireland)
- (Scotland) John Higgins 4–2 Jimmy White (England)
- (England) John Parrott 4–1 Ronnie O'Sullivan (England)
- (Scotland) John Higgins 4–3 Fergal O'Brien (Republic of Ireland)
- (Scotland) John Higgins 4–3 John Parrott (England)
- (Republic of Ireland) Fergal O'Brien 4–3 Jimmy White (England)
- (Republic of Ireland) Fergal O'Brien 4–1 John Parrott (England)
- (England) Ronnie O'Sullivan 4–2 Jimmy White (England)

=== Group B ===
| POS | Player | MP | MW | FW | FL | FD | PTS |
|---|---|---|---|---|---|---|---|
| 1 | (Scotland) Stephen Hendry | 4 | 3 | 14 | 9 | +5 | 3 |
| 2 | (Wales) Mark Williams | 4 | 2 | 12 | 9 | +3 | 2 |
| 3 | (England) Steve Davis | 4 | 2 | 11 | 12 | −1 | 2 |
| 4 | (Republic of Ireland) Ken Doherty | 4 | 2 | 10 | 12 | −2 | 2 |
| 5 | (England) Stephen Lee | 4 | 1 | 9 | 13 | −4 | 1 |

- (Wales) Mark Williams 4–0 Stephen Lee (England)
- (Scotland) Stephen Hendry 4–1 Steve Davis (England)
- (England) Steve Davis 4–2 Mark Williams (Wales)
- (Republic of Ireland) Ken Doherty 4–2 Stephen Hendry (Scotland)
- (Republic of Ireland) Ken Doherty 4–2 Steve Davis (England)
- (Scotland) Stephen Hendry 4–2 Stephen Lee (England)
- (Wales) Mark Williams 4–1 Ken Doherty (Republic of Ireland)
- (England) Steve Davis 4–3 Stephen Lee (England)
- (England) Stephen Lee 4–1 Ken Doherty (Republic of Ireland)
- (Scotland) Stephen Hendry 4–2 Mark Williams (Wales)

== Knockout stage ==
Semi-finals; Best of 9 frames
(Scotland) Stephen Hendry | 5
(Scotland) John Higgins | 2
(England) Ronnie O'Sullivan | 4
(Wales) Mark Williams | 5

Final; Best of 13 frames
(Scotland) Stephen Hendry | 7
(Wales) Mark Williams | 5
