= 2000 Premier League Snooker =

Altodigital.com Premier League
Tournament information
- Dates: 8 January – 6 May 2000
- Country: United Kingdom
- Organisation: Matchroom Sport
- Format: Non-ranking event

Final
- Champion: (Scotland) Stephen Hendry
- Runner-up: (Wales) Mark Williams
- Score: 9–5

The 2000 Altodigital.com Premier League was a professional non-ranking snooker tournament that was played from 8 January to 6 May 2000.

Stephen Hendry won in the final 9–5 against Mark Williams.

Hendry made his 500th career century in his match against Ronnie O'Sullivan at Stirling on 2 April.

== League phase ==
Ranking		(Scotland) HEN	(Scotland) HIG	(Wales) WIL	(England) OSU	(Hong Kong) FU	(England) WHI	(England) DAV	Frame W-L	Match W-D-L	Pld-Pts
1	Stephen Hendry	x	3	4	6	7	5	5	30–18	4–1–1	6–9
2	John Higgins	5	x	5	3	3	6	5	27–21	4–0–2	6–8
3	Mark Williams	4	3	x	4	5	6	5	27–21	3–2–1	6–8
4	Ronnie O'Sullivan	2	5	4	x	4	4	7	26–22	2–3–1	6–7
5	Marco Fu	1	5	3	4	x	5	6	24–24	3–1–2	6–7
6	Jimmy White	3	2	2	4	3	x	4	18–30	0–2–4	6–2
7	Steve Davis	3	3	3	1	2	4	x	16–32	0–1–5	6–1

Top four qualified for the play-offs. If points were level then most frames won determined their positions. If two players had an identical record then the result in their match determined their positions. If that ended 4–4 then the player who got to four first was higher.

- 8 January – Swansea Leisure Centre, Swansea, Wales
  - Mark Williams 5–3 Steve Davis
  - John Higgins 6–2 Jimmy White
- 9 January – Swansea Leisure Centre, Swansea, Wales
  - John Higgins 5–3 Steve Davis
  - Ronnie O'Sullivan 4–4 Jimmy White
  - Stephen Hendry 4–4 Mark Williams
- 5 February – North Kesteven Leisure Centre, Lincoln, England
  - Stephen Hendry 7–1 Marco Fu
  - Ronnie O'Sullivan 4–4 Marco Fu
  - Steve Davis 4–4 Jimmy White
- 6 February – North Kesteven Leisure Centre, Lincoln, England
  - John Higgins 5–3 Mark Williams
  - Ronnie O'Sullivan 5–3 John Higgins
  - Stephen Hendry 5–3 Steve Davis
- 18 March – Cleethorpes Leisure Centre, Cleethorpes, England
  - Mark Williams 4–4 Ronnie O'Sullivan
  - Stephen Hendry 5–3 Jimmy White
- 19 March – Cleethorpes Leisure Centre, Cleethorpes, England
  - Marco Fu 5–3 John Higgins
  - Ronnie O'Sullivan 7–1 Steve Davis
  - Marco Fu 5–3 Jimmy White
- 1 April – University of Stirling, Stirling, Scotland
  - Mark Williams 5–3 Marco Fu
  - John Higgins 5–3 Stephen Hendry
- 2 April – University of Stirling, Stirling, Scotland
  - Marco Fu 6–2 Steve Davis
  - Mark Williams 6–2 Jimmy White
  - Stephen Hendry 6–2 Ronnie O'Sullivan

== Play-offs ==
5–6 May – Charter Hall, Colchester, England

Semi-finals; Best of 11 frames
1	(Scotland) Stephen Hendry	6
4	(England) Ronnie O'Sullivan	2
2	(Scotland) John Higgins	3
3	(Wales) Mark Williams	6

Final; Best of 17 frames
1	(Scotland) Stephen Hendry	9
3	(Wales) Mark Williams	5
