= 1996–97 snooker season =

Details
- Duration: 9 September 1996 – 18 May 1997
- Tournaments: 20 (10 ranking events)

Triple Crown winners
- UK Championship: (Scotland) Stephen Hendry
- Masters: (England) Steve Davis
- World Championship: (Republic of Ireland) Ken Doherty

The 1996–97 snooker season was a series of snooker tournaments played between September 1996 and May 1997. The following table outlines the results of the finals for ranking events and the invitational events.

== Calendar ==
=== World Snooker Tour ===
Start	Finish	Country	Tournament name	Venue	City	Winner	Runner-up	Score	Ref.
9 Sep	15 Sep	THA	Asian Classic	Riverside Montien Hotel	Bangkok	(England) Ronnie O'Sullivan	(England) Brian Morgan	9–8	
24 Sep	29 Sep	SCO	Scottish Masters	Civic Centre	Motherwell	(England) Peter Ebdon	(Scotland) Alan McManus	9–6	
5 Oct	14 Oct	SCO	Benson & Hedges Championship	JP Snooker Centre	Edinburgh	(England) Brian Morgan	(Scotland) Drew Henry	9–8	
8 Oct	13 Oct	MLT	Malta Grand Prix	Jerma Palace Hotel	Marsaskala	(England) Nigel Bond	(Malta) Tony Drago	7–3	
16 Oct	27 Oct	ENG	Grand Prix	Bournemouth International Centre	Bournemouth	(Wales) Mark Williams	(Scotland) Euan Henderson	9–5	
29 Oct	10 Nov	THA	World Cup	Amari Watergate Hotel	Bangkok	Scotland	Ireland	10–7	
15 Nov	1 Dec	ENG	UK Championship	Guild Hall	Preston	(Scotland) Stephen Hendry	(Scotland) John Higgins	10–9	
9 Dec	15 Dec	GER	German Open	NAAFI	Osnabrück	(England) Ronnie O'Sullivan	(Canada) Alain Robidoux	9–7	
2 Jan	5 Jan	ENG	Charity Challenge	International Convention Centre	Birmingham	(Scotland) Stephen Hendry	(England) Ronnie O'Sullivan	9–8	
24 Jan	1 Feb	WAL	Welsh Open	Newport Leisure Centre	Newport	(Scotland) Stephen Hendry	(England) Mark King	9–2	
2 Feb	9 Feb	ENG	Masters	Wembley Conference Centre	London	(England) Steve Davis	(England) Ronnie O'Sullivan	10–8	
13 Feb	22 Feb	SCO	International Open	A.E.C.C.	Aberdeen	(Scotland) Stephen Hendry	(Malta) Tony Drago	9–1	
23 Feb	2 Mar	MLT	European Open	Mediterranean Conference Centre	Valletta	(Scotland) John Higgins	(England) John Parrott	9–5	
10 Mar	16 Mar	THA	Thailand Open	Century Park Hotel	Bangkok	(England) Peter Ebdon	(England) Nigel Bond	9–7	
18 Mar	23 Mar	IRL	Irish Masters	Goff's	Kill	(Scotland) Stephen Hendry	(Wales) Darren Morgan	9–8	
27 Mar	5 Apr	ENG	British Open	Plymouth Pavilions	Plymouth	(Wales) Mark Williams	(Scotland) Stephen Hendry	9–2	
19 Apr	5 May	ENG	World Championship	Crucible Theatre	Sheffield	(Republic of Ireland) Ken Doherty	(Scotland) Stephen Hendry	18–12	
12 May	16 May	WAL	Pontins Professional	Pontins	Prestatyn	(England) Martin Clark	(England) Andy Hicks	9–7	
28 Dec	18 May	ENG	European League	Diamond Centre	Irthlingborough	(England) Ronnie O'Sullivan	(Scotland) Stephen Hendry	10–8	

Ranking event
Non-ranking event

=== Seniors event ===
Start	Finish	Country	Tournament name	Venue	City	Winner	Runner-up	Score	Ref.
3 Mar	14 Mar	ENG	Seniors Pot Black	Goodwood House	Chichester	(England) Joe Johnson	(Wales) Terry Griffiths	2–0	

== Official rankings ==
The top 16 of the world rankings, these players automatically played in the final rounds of the world ranking events and were invited for the Masters.

No.	Ch.	Name	Points
1	Steady	(Scotland) Stephen Hendry	36911
2	▲	(Scotland) John Higgins	32341
3	▲	(England) Peter Ebdon	28115
4	Steady	(England) John Parrott	24339
5	▲	(England) Nigel Bond	22669
6	Steady	(Scotland) Alan McManus	21492
7	▲	(Republic of Ireland) Ken Doherty	21161
8	▼	(England) Ronnie O'Sullivan	21007
9	▼	(Wales) Darren Morgan	19142
10	▼	(England) Steve Davis	18252
11	▲	(England) Dave Harold	18247
12	▼	(Thailand) James Wattana	17641
13	▼	(England) Jimmy White	16620
14	▲	(Canada) Alain Robidoux	16058
15	▼	(Malta) Tony Drago	16031
16	▲	(Wales) Mark Williams	15988
