= 1997 European Open (snooker) =

Tournament information
- Dates: 23 February – 2 March 1997
- Venue: Mediterranean Conference Centre
- City: Valletta
- Country: Malta
- Organisation: World Professional Billiards and Snooker Association
- Format: Ranking event
- Total prize fund: £321,760
- Winner's share: £60,000
- Highest break: 141 (x2)

Final
- Champion: John Higgins (SCO)
- Runner-up: John Parrott (ENG)
- Score: 9–5

The 1997 European Open was the 1997 edition of the European Open snooker tournament, held from 23 February to 2 March 1997 at the Mediterranean Conference Centre, Valletta, Malta. John Higgins defeated John Parrott by nine frames to five (9–5) in the final to claim his sixth ranking-event title. In the semi-finals Higgins defeated James Wattana and Parrott beat Ken Doherty. The tournament was the seventh of ten WPBSA ranking events in the 1996/1997 season, following the International Open and preceding the Thailand Open.

== Tournament summary ==
The 1997 tournament was the seventh of tenth WPBSA ranking events in the 1996/1997 season, following the International Open and preceding the Thailand Open. Held in February, the International Open was won by Stephen Hendry, who defeated Tony Drago by nine frames to one (9–1) in the final.

=== Final ===
In the best-of-17 final Higgins defeated Parrott 9–5 to win his sixth ranking title, earning £60,000 in prize money.

== Main draw ==
Last 32; Best of 9 frames
(Scotland) Alan McManus	5
(England) Darren Clarke	2
(Wales) Darren Morgan	5
(England) Anthony Hamilton	3
(England) John Parrott	5
(Scotland) Drew Henry	2
(Malta) Tony Drago	5
(Wales) Paul Davies	0
(Republic of Ireland) Ken Doherty	5
(England) Robert Milkins	3
(England) Andy Hicks	5
(Wales) Mark Williams	3
(England) Peter Ebdon	5
(Wales) Tony Chappel	2
(Canada) Alain Robidoux	5
(England) Martin Clark	4
(Scotland) John Higgins	5
(Northern Ireland) Joe Swail	3
(England) Jimmy White	5
(Wales) Matthew Stevens	1
(England) Stephen Lee	5
(England) Steve Davis	0
(England) Nigel Bond	5
(England) Rod Lawler	3
(Scotland) Stephen Hendry	5
(Scotland) Jamie Burnett	1
(England) Jonathan Birch	5
(England) Dave Harold	1
(Scotland) Chris Small	5
(England) Ronnie O'Sullivan	1
(Thailand) James Wattana	5
(Scotland) Euan Henderson	2

Last 16; Best of 9 frames
(Scotland) Alan McManus	5
(Wales) Darren Morgan	3
(England) John Parrott	5
(Malta) Tony Drago	2
(Republic of Ireland) Ken Doherty	5
(England) Andy Hicks	3
(England) Peter Ebdon	5
(Canada) Alain Robidoux	3
(Scotland) John Higgins	5
(England) Jimmy White	3
(England) Stephen Lee	5
(England) Nigel Bond	1
(Scotland) Stephen Hendry	5
(England) Jonathan Birch	3
(Scotland) Chris Small	3
(Thailand) James Wattana	5

Quarter-finals; Best of 9 frames
(Scotland) Alan McManus	4
(England) John Parrott	5
(Republic of Ireland) Ken Doherty	5
(England) Peter Ebdon	3
(Scotland) John Higgins	5
(England) Stephen Lee	3
(Scotland) Stephen Hendry	2
(Thailand) James Wattana	5

Semi-finals; Best of 11 frames
(England) John Parrott	6
(Republic of Ireland) Ken Doherty	4
(Scotland) John Higgins	6
(Thailand) James Wattana	0

Final; Best of 17 frames
(England) John Parrott	5
(Scotland) John Higgins	9

=== Final ===
Final: Best of 17 frames. Referee: Mediterranean Conference Centre, Valletta, Malta, 2 March 1997.
John Parrott; England	5–9	John Higgins; Scotland
Afternoon: 9–74, 6–74, 1–109, 21–71, 4–62, 64–41, 56–48, 0–73; Evening: 101–1, 32–76, 71–12, 57–31, 32–71, 6–66
	Highest break	
	Century breaks	
	50+ breaks	
