= Malta Grand Prix =

Snooker tournament

Tournament information
- Venue: Mediterranean Conference Centre
- Location: Valletta
- Country: Malta
- Established: 1994
- Organisation(s): World Professional Billiards and Snooker Association
- Format: Non-ranking event
- Final year: 2001
- Final champion: (Scotland) Stephen Hendry

The Malta Grand Prix was a professional snooker tournament which ran from the 1994/95 season to 2000/2001, sponsored by Rothmans. In 2000 only it was a European ranking tournament.

== Winners ==
| Year | Winner | Runner-up | Final score | Season |
Malta Grand Prix (non-ranking)
| 1994 | (England) John Parrott | (Malta) Tony Drago | 7–6 | 1994/95 |
| 1995 | (England) Peter Ebdon | (Scotland) John Higgins | 7–4 | 1995/96 |
| 1996 | (England) Nigel Bond | (Malta) Tony Drago | 7–3 | 1996/97 |
| 1997 | (Republic of Ireland) Ken Doherty | (Scotland) John Higgins | 7–5 | 1997/98 |
| 1998 | (Scotland) Stephen Hendry | (Republic of Ireland) Ken Doherty | 7–6 | 1998/99 |
Malta Grand Prix (ranking)
| 2000 | (Republic of Ireland) Ken Doherty | (Wales) Mark Williams | 9–3 | 1999/00 |
Malta Grand Prix (non-ranking)
| 2001 | (Scotland) Stephen Hendry | (Wales) Mark Williams | 7–1 | 2000/01 |
