= 1996 Charity Challenge =

Tournament information
- Dates: 3–7 January 1996
- Venue: International Convention Centre
- City: Birmingham
- Country: England
- Organisation: WPBSA
- Format: Non-ranking event
- Winner's share: £30,000

Final
- Champion: (England) Ronnie O'Sullivan
- Runner-up: (Scotland) John Higgins
- Score: 9–6

The 1996 Liverpool Victoria Charity Challenge was the second edition of the professional invitational snooker tournament, which took place in January 1996. The tournament was played at the International Convention Centre in Birmingham, England, and featured sixteen professional players.

Ronnie O'Sullivan won the title, beating John Higgins 9–6 in the final.

== Main draw ==
Round 1 Best of 9 Frames
(England) Ronnie O'Sullivan | 5
(England) David Roe | 2
(Wales) Darren Morgan | 5
(Wales) Terry Griffiths | 3
(Republic of Ireland) Ken Doherty | 5
(Northern Ireland) Dennis Taylor | 3
(England) John Parrott | 5
(England) Dave Harold | 3
(Scotland) John Higgins | 5
(Scotland) Stephen Hendry | 4
(England) Jimmy White | 5
(England) Nigel Bond | 1
(England) Peter Ebdon | 5
(Malta) Tony Drago | 3
(England) Willie Thorne | 5
(Scotland) Alan McManus | 3

Quarter-finals; Best of 9 Frames
(England) Ronnie O'Sullivan | 5
(Wales) Darren Morgan | 2
(Republic of Ireland) Ken Doherty | 5
(England) John Parrott | 2
(Scotland) John Higgins | 5
(England) Jimmy White | 2
(England) Peter Ebdon | 5
(England) Willie Thorne | 2

Semi-finals; Best of 11 Frames
(England) Ronnie O'Sullivan | 6
(Republic of Ireland) Ken Doherty | 4
(Scotland) John Higgins | 6
(England) Peter Ebdon | 4

Final; Best of 17 Frames7
(England) Ronnie O'Sullivan | 9
(Scotland) John Higgins | 6
