= John Higgins =

Scottish snooker player (born 1975)

John Higgins MBE
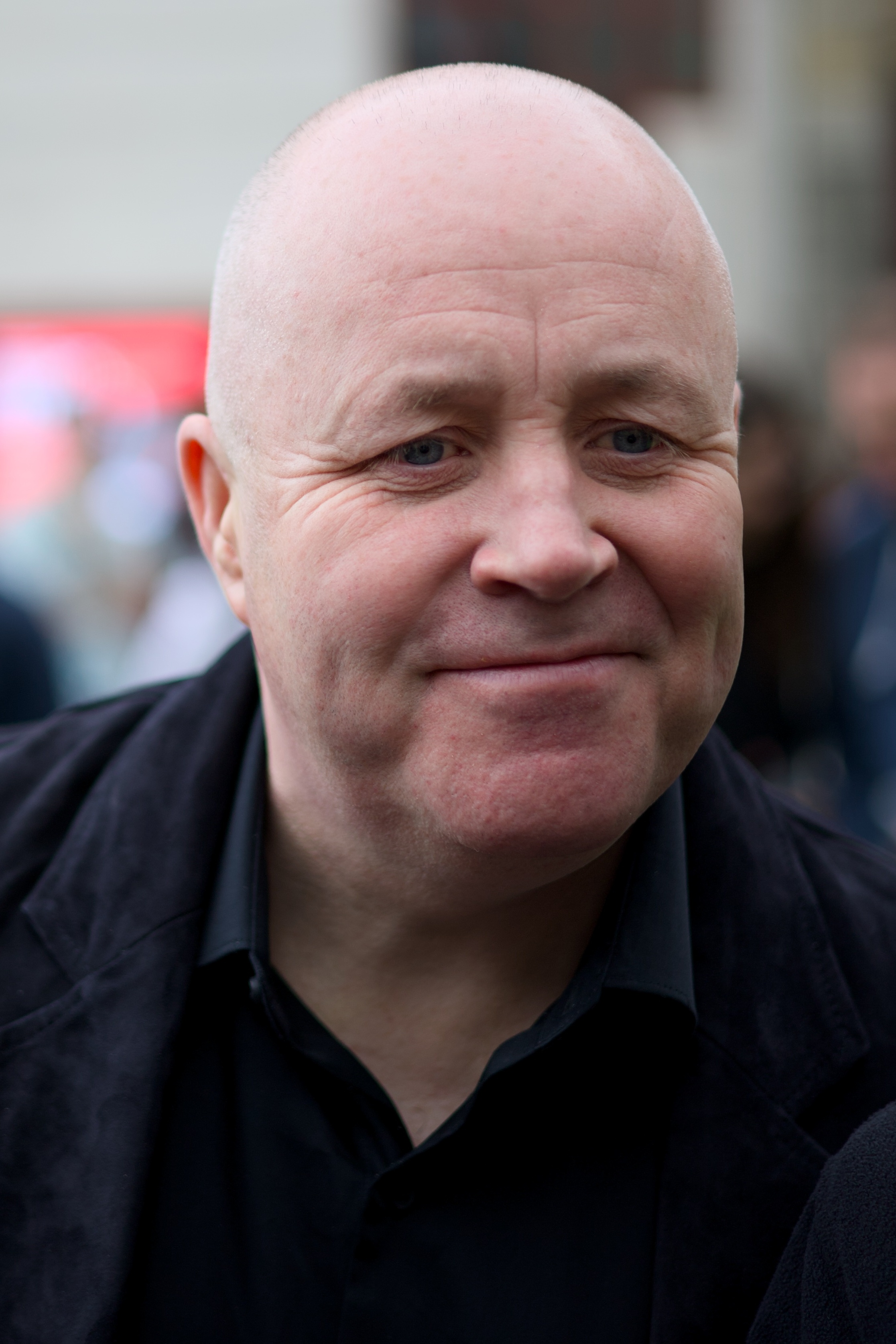
- Higgins in 2026

Personal information
- Nickname: The Wizard of Wishaw
- Born: 18 May 1975 (age 51) Wishaw, Lanarkshire, Scotland

Sport
- Country: Scotland
- Sport: Snooker
- Professional: 1992–present
- Highest ranking: 1 (May 1998 – May 2000, May 2007 – May 2008, May–September 2010, December 2010 – May 2011)
- Current ranking: 6 (as of 7 November 2026)
- Maximum breaks: 13
- Century breaks: 1,077 (as of 19 November 2026)

Tournament wins
- Ranking: 33
- Minor-ranking: 3
- World Championship: 1998; 2007; 2009; 2011

John Higgins (born 18 May 1975) is a Scottish professional snooker player from Wishaw, North Lanarkshire. He has won 33 ranking titles, placing him third on the all-time list. He has won four World Championships, three UK Championships, and two Masters for a total of nine Triple Crown titles. He has been ranked world number one on four occasions.

Higgins turned professional in the 1992–93 season, as did Ronnie O'Sullivan and Mark Williams; the three players are known collectively as the "Class of '92". During the 1994–95 season, he became the first teenager to win three ranking events in one season. He won his first world title in 1998, defeating Ken Doherty in the final, and won further world titles in 2007 and 2009, defeating Mark Selby and Shaun Murphy in the respective finals. In 2010, a tabloid newspaper carried out a sting operation in Ukraine that it claimed showed Higgins and his then-manager arranging to lose frames in future matches for money. An investigation cleared Higgins of match-fixing, but the World Professional Billiards and Snooker Association nevertheless found that he had brought the sport into disrepute by failing to disclose an invitation to breach its betting rules. He was banned for six months and fined £75,000. He won his fourth world title in 2011, beating Judd Trump in the final. He later lost three consecutive world finals, to Selby in 2017, Williams in 2018, and Trump in 2019. He lost five professional finals in the 2021–22 season.

Higgins made his 1,000th professional century break at the 2024 English Open, becoming the second player after O'Sullivan to reach that milestone. His 13 officially recognised maximum breaks are second only to O'Sullivan's 17. He holds the record for the longest uninterrupted spell in the elite top 16, having entered it in the 1995–96 rankings and stayed for more than 29 years, until September 2024. He also holds the record for the longest span between a player's first and most recent ranking titles, 30 years and 165 days, from the 1994 Grand Prix to the 2025 Tour Championship. He was appointed MBE in the 2008 New Year Honours and was inducted into the World Snooker Tour Hall of Fame in 2012.

== Career ==
=== Early professional years, first world championship ===
As amateur players, Higgins and Mark Williams faced each other in two finals in 1991. At the World Junior Masters Higgins won, while Williams won the British Junior Championship. The following year, Higgins turned professional. He reached the last eight of the 1993 British Open during his first season on the tour, before losing 3–5 to Jimmy White. Aged 19, Higgins defeated Dave Harold 9–6 in the final of the 1994 Grand Prix. This was the first ranking title of his career. The same season, he also won the 1995 International Open and the 1995 British Open, making him the first teenager to win three ranking events in a single season. He reached the finals of the 1995 Welsh Open, losing 3–9 to Steve Davis, and the 1995 Masters, losing by the same score to Ronnie O'Sullivan. His first time playing at the World Snooker Championship in 1995 he lost 3–10 in the first round to fellow Scottish player Alan McManus. Later that year he won his fourth ranking title at the inaugural 1995 German Open beating Ken Doherty 9–3 in the final.

At the 1996 International Open he defeated Rod Lawler 9–3 in the final, to retain the championship. Later that season, at the 1996 World Snooker Championship, he defeated Martin Clarke 10–5 in the first round and McManus 13–5 in the second round. Facing O'Sullivan in the quarter-finals, he led 12–10, but lost the match 12–13 after O'Sullivan won the last three frames. At the 1996 UK Championship, he defeated Tony Drago, Williams and Doherty to reach the final, where he faced the world champion, Stephen Hendry. Higgins trailed 4–8 before winning five consecutive frames to lead 9–8; however, he lost the final 9–10. He won his sixth ranking title at the 1997 European Open, defeating Parrott 9–5 in the final. He reached the quarter-finals again at the 1997 World Championship, but lost 9–13 to eventual winner Doherty. He won the 1997 German Open, beating Parrott 9–4 in the final, and won his eighth ranking title at the 1998 British Open, beating Hendry 9–8 in the final.

At the 1998 World Snooker Championship, Higgins defeated Jason Ferguson 10–8, Anthony Hamilton 13–9, John Parrott 13–11 and O'Sullivan 17–9 in the semi-finals. In the final, he defeated the defending champion Doherty 18–12 to win his first World Championship and ninth ranking title. He made a then-record 14 centuries during the tournament (Hendry beat his record, with 16 centuries, at the 2002 World Championship, which Mark Williams equalled at the 2022 World Championship). Higgins' success had seen him advance rapidly up the world rankings. In the 1994/1995 rankings, he was 51st; in the 1995/1996 rankings, he was 11th; and in the 1996/1997 and 1997/1998 rankings, he was second. After winning the world title, Higgins became world number one in the 1998/1999 rankings, ending Hendry's eight consecutive years in the top spot.

=== After the first world title ===
During the 1998–99 season, Higgins won the 1998 UK Championship, defeating Matthew Stevens 10–6 in the final, and the 1999 Masters, defeating Doherty 10–8 in the final. By winning the UK, Masters and World Championships, Higgins completed a career Triple Crown. He was also the third player, after Steve Davis and Hendry, to hold the three titles simultaneously, an achievement later emulated by Mark Williams. Higgins is also one of six players to have won both the World Championship and UK Championship in the same calendar year; the others are Davis, Hendry, Parrott, O'Sullivan and Mark Selby.

Higgins held the world number one position for two seasons before Williams replaced him at the top of the rankings. Higgins and Williams met in the 1999 Grand Prix final, where Higgins came from 2–6 down to claim a 9–8 victory. They also met in the 2000 World Snooker Championship semi-finals, where Higgins initially led 14–10 but ultimately lost 15–17. They also played again in the 2000 UK Championship final, where Higgins won 10–4 to claim his second UK title. Higgins reached his second world final at the 2001 World Snooker Championship, but lost 14–18 to O'Sullivan. At the beginning of the 2001–02 season, he became the first player to win the opening three tournaments in a season: the 2001 Champions Cup in August, the 2001 Scottish Masters in September, and the 2001 British Open in October. He failed to win a major title for another three years, until the 2004 British Open. Clive Everton later claimed that Higgins "lost his edge" during this period, due to becoming preoccupied with fatherhood; Higgins' wife Denise confirmed that she had to "push him out of the house to practise".

In the 2005 Grand Prix final, Higgins comprehensively defeated O'Sullivan 9–2. He became the first player to make four consecutive centuries in a ranking event, with breaks of 103, 104, 138 and 128 in frames 7–10. Higgins also scored a then-record 494 points without reply in the match. Of Higgins' performance, O'Sullivan commented that he had "never seen anything like it", while Everton stated that Higgins was "back to the kind of form which gave him the 1998 world title". Higgins and O'Sullivan also faced each other in consecutive Masters finals in 2005 and 2006. Higgins lost 3–10 in 2005. In 2006, he lost the first three frames, but won the next five to lead after the first session. O'Sullivan levelled the scores in the evening session and the match went to a deciding frame. O'Sullivan missed a red ball to a baulk pocket while on a break of 60, and Higgins made a clearance of 64 to win 10–9 and claim his second Masters title.

=== Second and third world titles ===
At the 2007 World Snooker Championship, Higgins beat Michael Holt, Fergal O'Brien, O'Sullivan and Stephen Maguire en route to the final. Trailing 10–14 against Maguire, Higgins won 17–15, making the 1,000th century to be made at the Crucible Theatre, Sheffield since the World Championship was first staged there in 1977. In the final, Higgins held a 12–4 advantage over Selby overnight, but Selby reduced his arrears to a single frame on day two. However, at 14–13, Higgins rediscovered his form to win four consecutive frames to clinch the match 18–13 to secure his second World title at 12:54 am, the latest finish to a World final (equalled when Neil Robertson beat Graeme Dott in 2010); and nine years after his first title – the longest time span between successes since Alex Higgins (1972, 1982) and the longest at the Crucible. He regained world number one status.

As World Champion, Higgins best performance was only reaching the quarter-final stages in the Welsh Open and China Open tournaments. He helped to establish, and actively promoted, the World Series of Snooker – a tour intended to bring snooker to new venues outside the traditional United Kingdom and recently developed Far East markets. He won the inaugural event in St. Helier in June 2008, beating Mark Selby 6–3 in the final. Higgins also devised a new players' union with his manager Pat Mooney, called The Snooker Players Association. He won the Grand Prix for the fourth time in 2008, beating Ryan Day 9–7 in the final in Glasgow – his first ranking tournament win on home soil.

At the 2009 World Snooker Championship, Higgins beat Michael Holt 10–5 in round one. His second-round and quarter-final matches both went the full distance of 25 frames, with Higgins overcoming Jamie Cope and Mark Selby, respectively, to win 13–12. He established a 13–3 lead in the semi-final against Mark Allen and progressed 17–13 . Higgins recorded an 18–9 victory over Shaun Murphy in the final to become the ninth player to win the World title three or more times after Joe Davis, Fred Davis, John Pulman, John Spencer, Ray Reardon, Steve Davis, Stephen Hendry and Ronnie O'Sullivan.

In the 2009–10 season, as reigning World Champion, he lost 5–6 on the black ball to Neil Robertson in the semi-final of the Grand Prix; and 8–10 to Ding Junhui in the final of the UK Championship, after surviving a comeback by Ronnie O'Sullivan in the semi-final when leading 8–2, to advance 9–8 the previous evening. He also defeated Neil Robertson 9–8 during the tournament. He captured the Welsh Open title by defeating Ali Carter 9–4 in the final, and ended the season as world number one despite an 11–13 loss to Steve Davis in round two of the World Championship.

=== Match-fixing allegations and fourth world title ===
==== Suspension ====
On 2 May 2010, Higgins and his manager, Pat Mooney, a World Professional Billiards and Snooker Association (WPBSA) board member, were the subject of match-fixing allegations. They were filmed in a sting operation conducted by the News of the World. On 30 April, an undercover News of the World team, led by Mazher Mahmood, posing as promoters, had met Higgins and his manager in a hotel room in Kyiv under the pretence of organising a series of events linked to the World Series of Snooker. The newspaper alleged that Higgins and Mooney had agreed to lose four frames in four separate tournaments in exchange for a total payment of €300,000 and further discussed the mechanics of how to fix a frame, which tournaments and opponents to choose and how Higgins would receive the money. Higgins was immediately suspended from the game and Mooney resigned from his position on the WPBSA board. Higgins issued a statement on the day of the allegations. He denied that he had ever been involved in match-fixing and explained that he had decided to "play along" out of fears for his safety, suspecting the involvement of the Russian Mafia.

A full investigation was conducted into the allegations by David Douglas, former Metropolitan Police detective chief superintendent and head of the WPBSA's disciplinary committee. The independent tribunal that followed in September 2010, hosted by Sports Resolutions (UK) and chaired by Ian Mill QC, concurred that the WPBSA was right to conclude that Higgins had truthfully accounted for his words and actions and to withdraw the more serious charges of match-fixing, but found him guilty of "giving the impression" that he would breach betting rules and of failing to report the approach made to him by the News of the World. Higgins received a six-month ban, backdated to the start of his suspension period, and was fined £75,000.

==== Return to snooker ====
Higgins returned to professional competition on 12 November 2010 in the Ruhr Championship – European Players Tour Championship (EPTC) event five in Hamm and went on to win the tournament beating Shaun Murphy 4–2 in the final. At the next event, the Prague Classic, the sixth European Players Tour event, he reached the final again, but lost 3–4 to Michael Holt.

At the 2010 UK Championship, his first tournament on British soil since his return, he reached his third final in succession. He fought back from 2–7 and 5–9 down against Mark Williams, and from 7–9 after trailing 0–61 and needing a snooker to level the match. He made a 68 break in the decider and sealed a 10–9 victory with a double on the brown ball. As a result of his progress in those three events, where he won 18 out of 19 matches, Higgins earned sufficient points to regain his position as world number one under the new two-year rolling ranking system after having slipped to third by missing the start of the 2010–11 snooker season.

Higgins lost in the first round of the 2011 Masters 4–6 against Graeme Dott, and withdrew from the German Masters after defeating Robert Milkins 5–3 in round one, to return home due to the deteriorating health of his father, who subsequently died from cancer. A little over two weeks later, Higgins successfully defended his Welsh Open title by beating Stephen Maguire 9–6 in the final – dedicating victory to his late father. Higgins won the Hainan Classic, defeating Jamie Cope in the final. Higgins reached the quarter-final of the China Open, where he lost 2–5 against Shaun Murphy. Higgins' next tournament was the Scottish Professional Championship, where he defeated Anthony McGill 6–1 in the final.

In the 2011 World Snooker Championship, Higgins defeated Stephen Lee 10–5 in the first round, Rory McLeod 13–7 in the second round and Ronnie O'Sullivan 13–10 in the quarter-finals. On the way to a 17–14 victory over Mark Williams in the semi-finals, Higgins was heckled by an audience member who shouted out, "How do you swallow that three hundred thousand, John? ... You're a disgrace to snooker." Higgins went on to defeat Judd Trump 18–15 in the final to win his fourth world title, which prompted Steve Davis to comment "I think John Higgins is the best snooker player I've ever seen in my life". Despite the victory, Higgins lost the world number one ranking to Mark Williams.

=== After the fourth world title (2011–2017) ===
In the 2011–12 snooker season, reaching only two quarter-finals of major ranking events. His season-best performance was reaching the semi-finals of the Masters, where he lost 4–6 to Shaun Murphy. Before the 2012 World Snooker Championship, he admitted that he had not practiced much throughout the season and did not feel confident about defending his title. In the first round of the tournament, he came from 6–8 down to defeat Liang Wenbo 10–9. He then played Hendry in the second round, the first time the two players had ever met in a World Championship match, but Hendry won 13–4, with Higgins calling it the worst he had ever played at the Crucible. He finished the season ranked world number five.

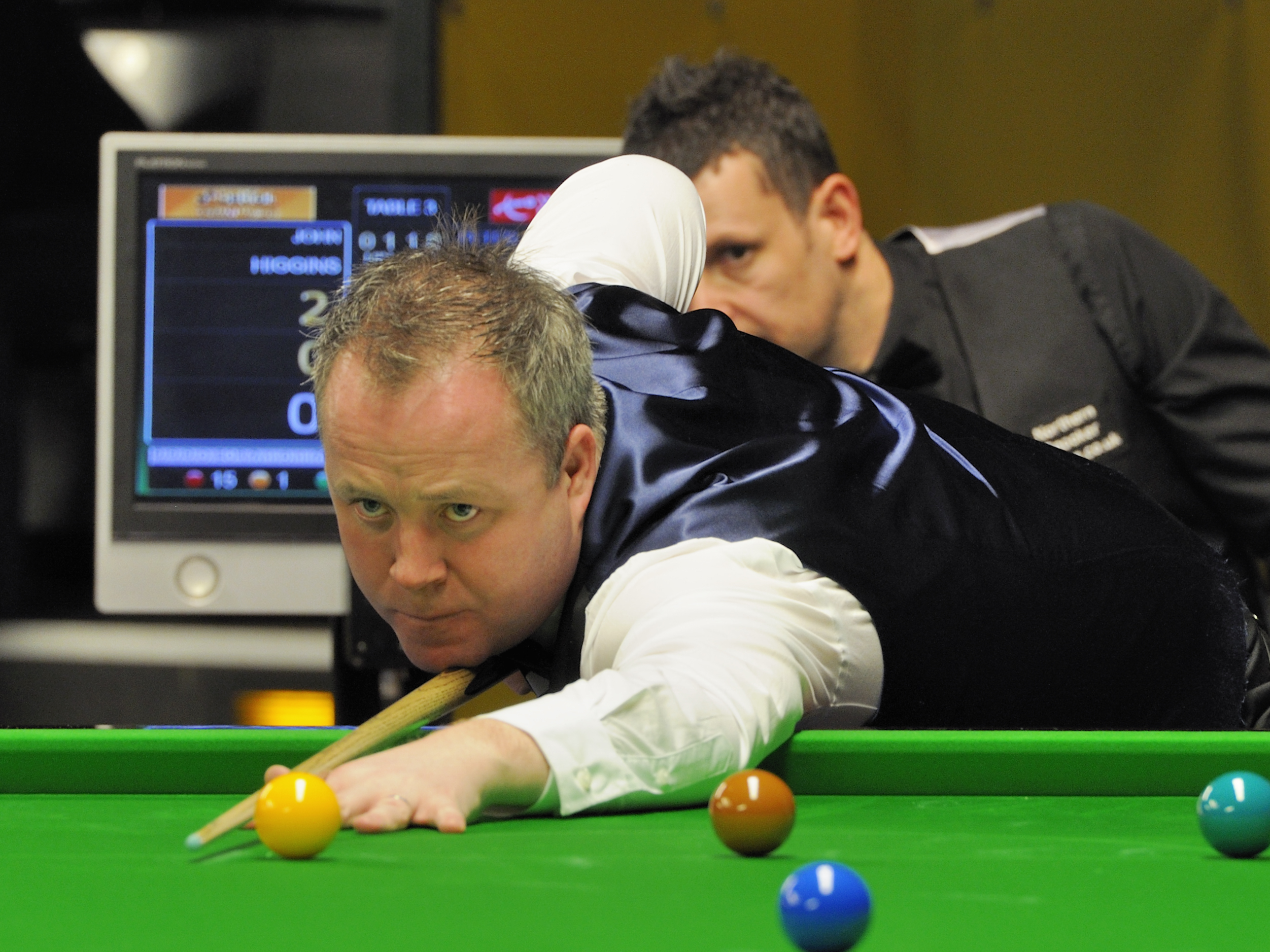
Higgins at 2013 German Masters

Higgins started the 2012–13 season by winning his 25th ranking title at the Shanghai Masters, after coming back from 2–7 down to defeat Judd Trump 10–9 in the final. He made a maximum break during the final and another in his second-round match against Mark Davis at the 2012 UK Championship. He won the minor-ranking Kay Suzanne Memorial Trophy, defeating Trump 4–2 in the final, also reaching the final of the minor-ranking Bulgarian Open, where he lost 0–4 to Trump. However, Higgins did not enjoy sustained success for the rest of the season, reaching only one other semi-final of a major ranking event, the World Open, which he lost 2–6 to Mark Allen. He exited the 2013 World Snooker Championship in the first round, losing 6–10 to Mark Davis. Afterward, he admitted that doubts about whether he could remain at the top of the world rankings after 20 years as a professional had affected his form. He finished the season ranked 11th, slipping out of the top 10 for the first time in 17 seasons.

Playing with a new cue, he won the minor-ranking 2013 Bulgarian Open with a 4–1 victory over Neil Robertson in the final, having beaten Shaun Murphy and Ronnie O'Sullivan earlier in the event. He reached the final of the season's first major ranking event, the 2013 Wuxi Classic, which he lost 7–10 to Robertson. He changed his cue again before defending his Shanghai Masters title, but lost 1–5 to Mark Davis in the last 16. His Kay Suzanne Memorial Cup title defence ended when he was whitewashed 0–4 by Andrew Higginson in the last 128. He lost 2–4 to Ding Junhui in the last 16 of the 2013 Indian Open, and 2–6 to Matthew Stevens in the last 32 of the 2013 International Championship. In the invitational 2013 Champion of Champions, he lost 3–4 in the first round to Maguire.

Higgins called his form "soul-destroying" as lost 3–6 to Maguire in the last 16 of the 2013 UK Championship. Referring to Higgins' frequent changes of cue, Joe Johnson alleged in commentary that Higgins was "searching for something that is not there" and "looking for someone or something to blame" for his poor form. Higgins retaliated by claiming that players in Johnson's era had struggled to make breaks of 30 or 40 on tables with much larger pockets and by calling Johnson one of the sport's worst commentators. After the UK Championship, he slipped to number 12 in the world rankings, having failed to progress beyond the last 16 of any tournament since the Wuxi Classic in June.

Before the 2014 Masters, Higgins revealed that he had reached the "depths of despair" after the UK Championship, after spending months "in turmoil". He also revealed that he had switched to a fourth new cue, had regained his tempo and felt that he was playing better than he had in some time. He defeated Stuart Bingham 6–2 in the first round, but lost 5–6 in the quarter-finals to defending champion Selby, despite having led the match 5–3.

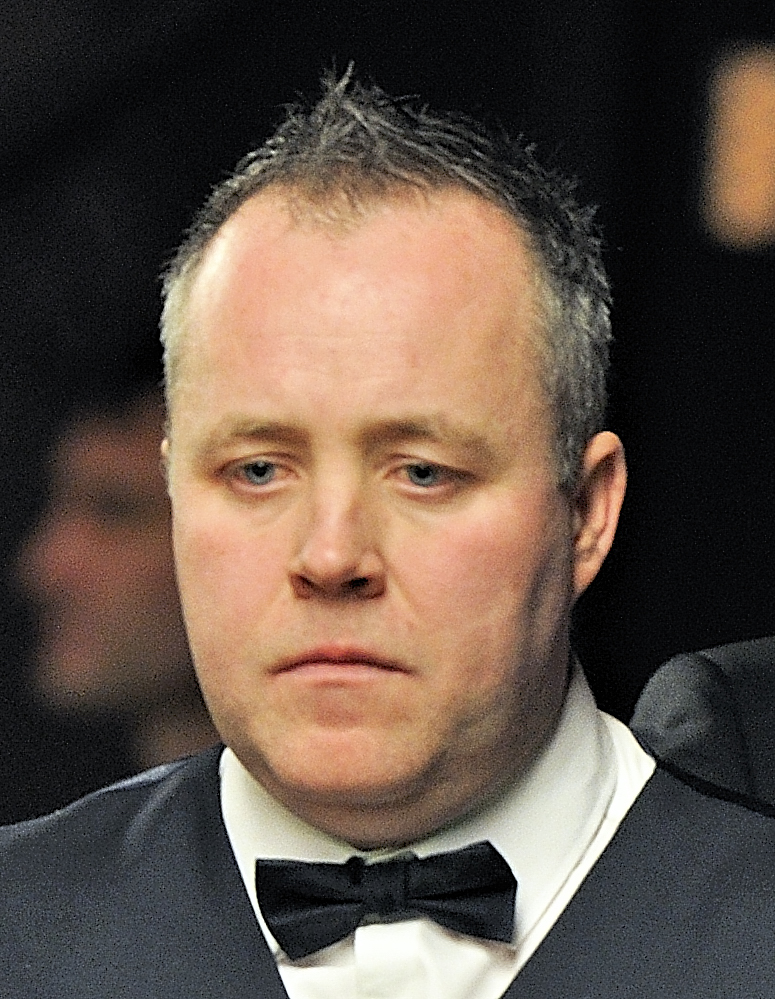
Higgins at the 2014 German Masters

At the 2014 German Masters, Higgins lost 3–5 to Dominic Dale in the last 32. At the 2014 Welsh Open, he defeated Trump 4–3 in the last 16, but lost 1–5 to O'Sullivan in the quarter-finals. He reached a third consecutive ranking tournament quarter-final at the Players Tour Championship Finals, but lost 1–4 to Marco Fu. He suffered a second consecutive first-round exit from the World Championship when he lost 7–10 to fellow Scot Alan McManus. After the match, Higgins described himself as a "journeyman top-16 player now," suggesting that he no longer regarded himself among the top contenders at tournaments. He ended the campaign as the world number 11, the lowest he has been at the end of the season in 19 years.

Higgins continued to struggle in the opening ranking events of the 2014–15 season, losing 4–5 to Alan McManus in the last 32 of the Wuxi Classic, 2–5 to Robert Milkins in the last 16 of the Australian Goldfields Open, and 4–5 to Ryan Day in the last 32 of the Shanghai Masters. He defended his minor-ranking Bulgarian Open title, but lost 1–4 against Judd Trump in the last 64. At the ranking International Championship, he lost 1–6 to Li Hang in the last 64. He lost 1–4 to Barry Hawkins in the first round of the Champion of Champions invitational tournament, and in the last 64 of the minor-ranking Ruhr Open, he failed to score a single point on his way to a 0–4 defeat by Marco Fu, who outscored Higgins by a cumulative total of 412 points to 0.

Higgins arrived at the 2014 UK Championship stating that he was struggling for confidence and concerned that a poor result in the championship could cost him his top-16 ranking and his place at the Masters. However, he defeated Lee Walker 6–2, Jamie Cope 6–4 and Matthew Stevens 6–2 to reach the last 16, where he lost 5–6 to Anthony McGill. This was enough to keep him inside the top 16, at number 14. At the Masters, he faced Mark Allen in the first round. Even though he made three century breaks, Higgins lost the match 4–6. After the match, he said that "I feel my form is steadily coming back – even when I've been losing matches I have still been gaining nuggets of confidence and I thought I played pretty well again."

In the 2015 German Masters, Higgins lost 2–5 to Peter Ebdon in the first round, but he at the Welsh Open, he defeated Stephen Maguire 5–1 in the quarter-finals, Luca Brecel 6–4 in the semi-finals and Ben Woollaston 9–3 in the final to claim a fourth Welsh Open title, his first ranking title in two and a half years. In the last 16 of the 2015 Indian Open, he suffered a sixth consecutive defeat to Mark Davis when he lost 0–4, scoring only 38 points in the match. He lost 3–4 to Graeme Dott in the last 32 of the World Grand Prix and lost by the same scoreline to Stephen Maguire in the last 32 of the Players Championship Grand Final. In the China Open, he reached the quarter-finals, defeating Dott and Trump along the way, but lost 4–5 to Ding Junhui. At the 2015 World Snooker Championship, Higgins won his first match at the event since 2012 with a 10–5 first round victory over Robert Milkins, but he lost 9–13 to Ding Junhui in the second round, despite winning five of the first six frames.

Higgins won his 27th ranking title at the 2015 Australian Goldfields Open by beating Martin Gould 9–8 in the final. Later that year, he also defeated David Gilbert 10–5 in the final of the 2015 International Championship. This put Higgins level with Steve Davis in the list of total ranking events won. Higgins started his quarter-final with Neil Robertson at the 2015 UK Championship by making the 600th century break of his career, but lost the match 5–6. Higgins reached the semi-finals of the China Open, but lost 5–6 after Ricky Walden made a 131 break in the deciding frame. He defeated Ryan Day 10–3 and Walden 13–8 at the 2016 World Snooker Championship, but lost 13–11 to Alan McManus in the quarter-finals, having been 11–9 ahead. He said later that he had "cracked under pressure".

Higgins lost in the quarter-finals of both the 2016 English Open and International Championship, 5–1 to Judd Trump and 6–2 to Ding Junhui respectively. He faced Stuart Bingham in the final of the inaugural China Championship; with the scores tied at 7–7, Higgins made three successive centuries to claim the title and £200,000, which was, at the time, the highest prize awarded outside the United Kingdom. At the 2016 Champion of Champions, he defeated Ding 6–5 in the semi-finals despite Ding making four centuries in the match. Higgins defeated Ronnie O'Sullivan 10–7 in the final to win his second title in a week. In the second round of the 2016 Northern Ireland Open, he made the eighth maximum break of his career and also scored breaks of 137 and 130 in a 4–1 victory over Sam Craigie. He lost a deciding frame to Selby in the quarter-finals of the 2016 UK Championship. He closed out 2016 by beating O'Sullivan 5–2 in the quarter-finals of the Scottish Open and then came back from 5–1 down to Judd Trump to win the semi-final 6–5. In the final against Marco Fu, he made three centuries in moving 4–1 ahead, but then lost eight frames in a row to lose 4–9. Higgins won the non-ranking Championship League by beating Ryan Day 3–0 in the final.

At the 2017 World Snooker Championship, Higgins defeated Martin Gould, Mark Allen, Kyren Wilson and Barry Hawkins to reach his first world final in six years. He became, aged 41, the oldest finalist in 35 years. In a rematch of the 2007 final, he faced Mark Selby. Higgins took a 10–4 lead, but then lost 12 of the next 14 frames, eventually losing 15–18. Higgins finished the season second in the world rankings, only behind Selby.

=== 2017 to present ===
He won the 2017 Indian Open, defeating Anthony McGill 5–1 in the final. The following year, he won his thirtieth ranking event at the 2018 Welsh Open, defeating Barry Hawkins 9–7 in the final. Higgins also reached the final of the 2018 World Snooker Championship, but lost again to Mark Williams. At the 2019 World Snooker Championship Higgins reached the final again, only to be beaten 18–9 by Judd Trump. This was Higgins' third consecutive World Championship final and his eighth overall.

Higgins surpassed Stephen Hendry's career total of 775 centuries during the 2019 Scottish Open. He made his 775th century on 11 December during his match against Alexander Ursenbacher and his 776th against Jack Lisowski the following day. Higgins made his 800th career century on the first day of the 2020 Champion of Champions, although he lost the match to Ding Junhui.

In the 2020–21 season, Higgins reached his first Masters final since 2006 after beating Allen, O'Sullivan and David Gilbert. However, he was defeated by tournament debutant Yan Bingtao 8–10 in the final. On 28 February 2021, Higgins defeated Ronnie O'Sullivan in the final of the Players Championship to claim his 31st ranking title and his first ranking title in three years. After his win, Higgins said that was "the best week of [his] snooker career" in terms of the way he played. In his quarter-final against Mark Selby, Higgins outscored his opponent 546–7 in a 6–0 victory. After the match, Selby stated that, "I've never had a match where I had so few chances. John froze me out from start to finish, he played an incredible match."

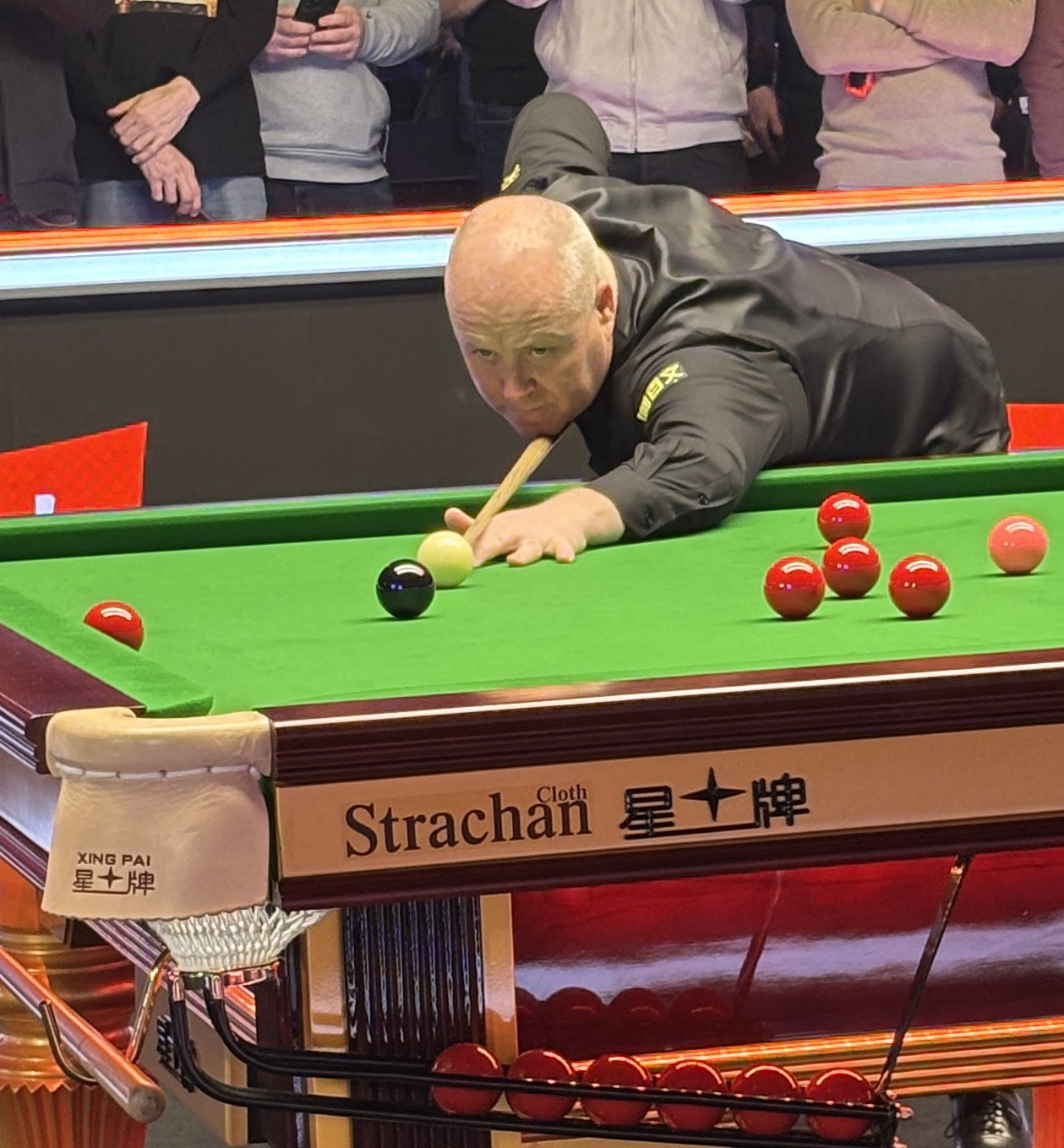
Higgins at the 2026 Masters

Before the beginning of the 2021–22 snooker season, Higgins lost a significant amount of weight by taking spin classes. He weighed 15 1/2 stones (217 lbs or 98.5 kg) during the 2021 World Championship, but began the new season at 12 stones (168 lbs or 76 kg). At the 2021 Northern Ireland Open, he won six consecutive frames to defeat Yan Bingtao 6–2 in the semi-finals, but lost the final 8–9 to Mark Allen, despite having led 8–6. At the 2021 English Open, Higgins came from 3–5 behind in the semi-finals to defeat O'Sullivan 6–5, but he lost the final 8–9 to Neil Robertson, despite again having led 8–6. This defeat meant that Higgins had lost six of his previous seven major finals. In his post-match comments, he expressed doubt about his ability to compete in ranking finals, stating: "The last two finals I really do think show I've not really got it at this level." Higgins went on to lose the 2021 Champion of Champions final 4–10 to Trump, and the 2021 Scottish Open final 5–9 to Luca Brecel. Even though he lost in the round of 32 at the Gibraltar Open, he won the BetVictor Series bonus of £150,000 by winning the most prize money across the series as a whole. At the 2022 Tour Championship, he came from 4–8 behind to defeat Zhao Xintong 10–9 in the quarter-finals, a victory he called one of his "best ever wins", and went on to face Robertson in the final. Higgins established a 9–4 lead, but lost his fifth major final of the season after Robertson won six consecutive frames to win 10–9. Afterwards, Higgins admitted that losing the final from a position of being five frames up with six to play would leave "real mental scars". At the 2022 World Championship, Higgins won his quarter-final match against Jack Lisowski on a deciding frame, but lost 11–17 in the semi-finals to eventual champion O'Sullivan, finishing the season ranked fifth in the world.

Higgins reached the quarter-final of the 2024 World Championship with a 13–12 win over Allen in the last 16. He then played Kyren Wilson but fell to an 8–13 defeat. In September 2024, Higgins made his 1000th career century at the English Open to become just the second player after O'Sullivan to achieve this feat. Higgins was runner-up at the 2024 British Open, losing to Mark Selby 5–10 in the final. Despite defeat, Higgins returned into the top 16 of the world rankings, having dropped out the previous week for the first time since 1995. At the 2025 Masters, Higgins held a 5–1 lead over Neil Robertson in their first round match but Robertson then won five consecutive frames to win 5–6. At the World Open, Higgins won his thirty-second ranking event with a 10–6 win over Joe O'Connor in the final. It was Higgins first title for four years, and at forty nine years of age Higgins also became the oldest player to win a ranking title since Ray Reardon in 1982. Higgins won his second title of the 2024–25 season at the Tour Champiosnhip. He fought back from 5–8 down to win five consecutive frames and defeat Mark Selby 10–8. Higgins reached the quarter-finals of the 2025 World Championship where he faced Mark Williams. Higgins fought back from 8–12 behind to force a deciding frame, but a miss on the final blue proved pivotal, and Higgins exited the tournament 12–13.

In November, Higgins reached the final of the International Championship where he was defeated by Wu Yize 6–10. In January, at the Masters, he became the oldest player to ever reach the final of a triple crown event with his route to the final including wins over Zhao Xintong and Trump. In the final, he lost to Kyren Wilson 6–10. He also reached the final of the Players Championship where he lost 7–10 to Zhao Xintong. In April, Higgins suffered the heaviest defeat of his career after losing 1–10 to Zhao in the semi-finals of the Tour Championship. It was the third time that he had lost by nine frames in a match but the first time in a best-of-nineteen frames encounter.

In the second round of the 2026 World Championship, Higgins came back from 4–9 behind to defeat O'Sullivan 13–12 in a final-frame decider. He then defeated Robertson 13–10, but his run ended in the semi-finals, where he was overcome 15–17 by Murphy.

== Personal life ==
In 2000, 25-year-old Higgins married his childhood sweetheart, 24-year-old Denise (née Whitton). They have three children together, two sons and a daughter. Higgins is a supporter of Celtic F.C. and also follows English club Everton. He enjoys playing poker. In 2006, Higgins was escorted off a plane for being drunk after losing the Malta Cup final to Ken Doherty, but he became teetotal in preparation for the 2007 World Championship which he went on to win. Higgins was appointed Member of the Order of the British Empire (MBE) in the 2008 New Year Honours.

In January 2010, Higgins appeared on the BBC's Celebrity Mastermind, answering questions on his specialist subject Dallas. He finished third equal. In February of that year, Higgins and his wife Denise appeared on ITV's Mr. and Mrs. and reached the final after answering all of their questions correctly to win £30,000. They donated the money to The Dalziel Centre – a day hospice for cancer patients, based at Strathclyde Hospital in Motherwell, of which Higgins became a patron after they cared for his terminally ill father.

In a complex mathematical study conducted at the University of Limerick, Higgins was named the highest performing snooker player from 1968 to 2020, ahead of Ronnie O'Sullivan, Mark Williams and Stephen Hendry.

== Performance and rankings timeline ==
Tournament	1992/ 93	1993/ 94	1994/ 95	1995/ 96	1996/ 97	1997/ 98	1998/ 99	1999/ 00	2000/ 01	2001/ 02	2002/ 03	2003/ 04	2004/ 05	2005/ 06	2006/ 07	2007/ 08	2008/ 09	2009/ 10	2010/ 11	2011/ 12	2012/ 13	2013/ 14	2014/ 15	2015/ 16	2016/ 17	2017/ 18	2018/ 19	2019/ 20	2020/ 21	2021/ 22	2022/ 23	2023/ 24	2024/ 25	2025/ 26	2026/ 27
Ranking (Note: From the 2010/2011 season it shows the ranking at the beginning of the season.)	(Note: New players on the Main Tour don't have a ranking.)	122	51	11	2	2	1	1	2	3	4	4	5	6	4	1	5	4	1	2	5	11	11	13	6	2	4	5	7	7	5	9	16	4	5
Ranking tournaments
Championship League	Tournament Not Held															Non-Ranking Event													3R	RR	A	A	RR	A	A
China Open (Note: The event was called the China International (1997/1998–1998/1999))	Tournament Not Held					NR	W	1R	1R	SF	Not Held		2R	F	QF	QF	F	2R	QF	2R	1R	3R	QF	SF	3R	2R	1R	Tournament Not Held							1R
Wuhan Open	Tournament Not Held																															1R	3R	QF	WD
British Open	QF	2R	W	F	1R	W	SF	QF	3R	W	QF	QF	W	Tournament Not Held																3R	1R	1R	F	SF	3R
English Open	Tournament Not Held																								QF	4R	4R	A	SF	F	3R	SF	3R	A	A
Shenzhen Open (Note: The event was called the Xi'an Grand Prix (2024/2025–2025/2026))	Tournament Not Held																																1R	LQ	LQ
Northern Ireland Open	Tournament Not Held																								4R	3R	1R	SF	4R	F	2R	A	2R	QF	2R
International Championship	Tournament Not Held																				1R	2R	1R	W	QF	QF	LQ	3R	Not Held			3R	QF	F	F
UK Championship	LQ	LQ	LQ	SF	F	1R	W	SF	W	QF	QF	2R	2R	3R	SF	1R	QF	F	W	2R	2R	4R	4R	QF	QF	4R	2R	QF	4R	3R	1R	2R	2R	2R	
Shoot-Out	Tournament Not Held																		Non-Ranking Event						A	A	A	A	2R	A	A	A	A	A	
Scottish Open (Note: The event was called the International Open (1992/1993–1996/1997) and the Players Championship (2003/2004))	LQ	LQ	W	W	SF	F	SF	QF	3R	2R	SF	2R	Tournament Not Held								MR	Not Held			F	SF	4R	4R	2R	F	2R	SF	2R	2R	
German Masters (Note: The event was called the German Open (1995/1996–1997/1998))	Not Held			W	SF	W	NR	Tournament Not Held											WD	2R	LQ	2R	1R	LQ	LQ	A	1R	1R	WD	LQ	LQ	QF	2R	2R	
Welsh Open	LQ	LQ	F	3R	QF	F	3R	W	QF	QF	2R	3R	3R	3R	2R	QF	2R	W	W	2R	2R	QF	W	4R	1R	W	QF	QF	3R	2R	3R	SF	QF	SF	
World Grand Prix	Tournament Not Held																						NR	2R	1R	2R	1R	QF	2R	1R	DNQ	1R	QF	1R	
Players Championship (Note: The event was called the Players Tour Championship Grand Finals (2010/2011–2012/2013) and the Players Championship Grand Final (2013/2014–2015/2016))	Tournament Not Held																		DNQ	1R	1R	QF	1R	DNQ	1R	1R	QF	QF	W	QF	DNQ	QF	SF	F	
World Open (Note: The event was called the Grand Prix (1992/1993–2000/2001 and 2004/2005–2009/2010), the LG Cup (2001/2002–2003/2004) and the Haikou World Open (2011/2012–2013/2014))	3R	3R	W	F	3R	F	1R	W	WD	QF	3R	F	1R	W	QF	2R	W	SF	A	QF	SF	QF	Not Held		QF	3R	A	SF	Not Held			1R	W	1R	
Tour Championship	Tournament Not Held																										DNQ	QF	QF	F	DNQ	1R	W	SF	
World Championship	LQ	LQ	1R	QF	QF	W	SF	SF	F	QF	QF	2R	2R	1R	W	2R	W	2R	W	2R	1R	1R	2R	QF	F	F	F	2R	2R	SF	QF	QF	QF	SF	
Non-ranking tournaments
Shanghai Masters	Tournament Not Held															Ranking Event											2R	2R	Not Held			QF	2R	2R	QF
Champion of Champions	Tournament Not Held																					1R	1R	QF	W	QF	QF	QF	1R	F	QF	SF	A	QF	A
Riyadh Season Championship	Tournament Not Held																															QF	A	QF	
The Masters	LQ	LQ	F	1R	1R	1R	W	1R	1R	1R	QF	SF	F	W	1R	1R	SF	1R	1R	SF	QF	QF	1R	QF	1R	SF	1R	QF	F	QF	1R	1R	1R	F	
Championship League	Tournament Not Held															A	2R	2R	RR	A	2R	RR	RR	RR	W	W	SF	RR	SF	W	W	SF	A	A	
Former ranking tournaments
Dubai Classic (Note: The event was called the Thailand Classic (1995/1996) and the Asian Classic (1996/1997))	LQ	LQ	2R	QF	1R	Tournament Not Held																													
Malta Grand Prix	Not Held		Non-Ranking Event					QF	NR	Tournament Not Held																									
Thailand Masters (Note: The event was called the Asian Open (1992/1993) and the Thailand Open (1993/1994–1996/1997))	LQ	LQ	1R	QF	1R	1R	QF	1R	SF	QF	NR	Not Held			NR	Tournament Not Held																			
Irish Masters	Non-Ranking Event										F	QF	1R	NH	NR	Tournament Not Held																			
Northern Ireland Trophy	Tournament Not Held													NR	3R	2R	SF	Tournament Not Held																	
Wuxi Classic (Note: The event was called the Jiangsu Classic (2008/2009–2009/2010))	Tournament Not Held																Non-Ranking Event				A	F	2R	Tournament Not Held											
Australian Goldfields Open (Note: The event was called the Australian Open (1994/1995) and the Australian Masters (1995/1996))	Not Held		NR		Tournament Not Held															1R	A	A	2R	W	Tournament Not Held										
Riga Masters (Note: The event was called the Riga Open (2014/2015–2015/2016))	Tournament Not Held																						MR		3R	A	A	A	Tournament Not Held						
Shanghai Masters	Tournament Not Held															2R	2R	SF	A	QF	W	2R	1R	2R	2R	SF	NR		Not Held			Non-Ranking Event			
Indian Open	Tournament Not Held																					3R	3R	NH	A	W	SF	Tournament Not Held							
China Championship	Tournament Not Held																								NR	2R	F	3R	Tournament Not Held						
Turkish Masters	Tournament Not Held																													3R	Tournament Not Held				
Gibraltar Open	Tournament Not Held																							MR	2R	A	A	WD	WD	3R	Tournament Not Held				
WST Classic	Tournament Not Held																														QF	Tournament Not Held			
European Masters (Note: The event was called the European Open (1992/1993–1996/1997), Irish Open (1998/1999) and Malta Cup (2004/2005–2007/2008))	LQ	QF	1R	1R	W	NH	2R	Not Held		2R	QF	QF	SF	F	1R	NR	Tournament Not Held								QF	2R	WD	2R	1R	2R	LQ	SF	Not Held		
Saudi Arabia Masters	Tournament Not Held																																5R	5R	NH
Former non-ranking tournaments
Australian Goldfields Open	Not Held		W	A	Tournament Not Held															Ranking Event					Tournament Not Held										
Champions Super League	Tournament Not Held						F	Tournament Not Held																											
German Masters	Not Held			Ranking Event			QF	Tournament Not Held											Ranking Event																
Malta Grand Prix	Not Held		A	F	A	F	QF	R	SF	Tournament Not Held																									
Champions Cup (Note: The event was called the Charity Challenge (1994/1995–1998/1999))	Not Held		A	F	QF	W	W	SF	SF	W	Tournament Not Held																								
Scottish Masters	1R	A	A	QF	SF	SF	F	F	QF	W	F	Tournament Not Held																							
World Champions v Asia Stars	Tournament Not Held												F	Tournament Not Held																					
Northern Ireland Trophy	Tournament Not Held													1R	Ranking Event			Tournament Not Held																	
Irish Masters	A	A	A	1R	QF	SF	QF	W	QF	W	Ranking Event			NH	SF	Tournament Not Held																			
Warsaw Snooker Tour	Tournament Not Held															F	Tournament Not Held																		
Euro-Asia Masters Challenge	Tournament Not Held											A	Not Held			W	Tournament Not Held																		
Pot Black	A	A	Tournament Not Held											SF	F	QF	Tournament Not Held																		
European Open	Ranking Event					Tournament Not Held				Ranking Event						SF	Tournament Not Held								Ranking Event										
World Series Jersey	Tournament Not Held																W	Tournament Not Held																	
World Series Berlin	Tournament Not Held																SF	Tournament Not Held																	
World Series Moscow	Tournament Not Held																W	Tournament Not Held																	
World Series Grand Final	Tournament Not Held																F	Tournament Not Held																	
World Series Killarney	Tournament Not Held																	SF	Tournament Not Held																
World Series Prague	Tournament Not Held																	SF	Tournament Not Held																
Scottish Professional Championship	Tournament Not Held																		W	Tournament Not Held															
Hainan Classic	Tournament Not Held																		W	Tournament Not Held															
Power Snooker	Tournament Not Held																		A	RR	Tournament Not Held														
Premier League (Note: The event was called the European League (1992/1993–1996/1997))	A	A	A	A	RR	SF	W	SF	SF	F	RR	F	A	A	A	F	RR	SF	A	RR	SF	Tournament Not Held													
World Grand Prix	Tournament Not Held																						1R	Ranking Event											
Shoot-Out	Tournament Not Held																		2R	2R	1R	1R	1R	1R	Ranking Event										
China Championship	Tournament Not Held																								W	Ranking Event									
Romanian Masters	Tournament Not Held																									QF	Tournament Not Held								
Hong Kong Masters	Tournament Not Held																									QF	Tournament Not Held				SF	Tournament Not Held			
Six-red World Championship (Note: The event was called the Six-red Snooker International (2008/2009) and the Six-red World Grand Prix (2009/2010))	Tournament Not Held																A	QF	A	NH	A	3R	QF	RR	A	A	A	F	Not Held		QF	Tournament Not Held			

Performance Table Legend
LQ	lost in the qualifying draw	#R	lost in the early rounds of the tournament (WR = Wildcard round, RR = Round robin)	QF	lost in the quarter-finals
SF	lost in the semi-finals	F	lost in the final	W	won the tournament
DNQ	did not qualify for the tournament	A	did not participate in the tournament	WD	withdrew from the tournament
DQ	disqualified from the tournament				

NH / Not Held	event was not held.
NR / Non-Ranking Event	event is/was no longer a ranking event.
R / Ranking Event	event is/was a ranking event.
MR / Minor-Ranking Event	means an event is/was a minor-ranking event.
PA / Pro-am Event	means an event is/was a pro-am event.

== Career finals ==
=== Ranking finals: 61 (33 titles) ===
Legend
World Championship (4–4)
UK Championship (3–2)
Other (26–22)

Outcome	No.	Year	Championship	Opponent in the final	Score	Ref.
Winner	1.	1994	Grand Prix	(England) Dave Harold	9–6	
Runner-up	1.	1995	Welsh Open	(England) Steve Davis	3–9	
Winner	2.	1995	International Open	(England) Steve Davis	9–5	
Winner	3.	1995	British Open	(England) Ronnie O'Sullivan	9–6	
Runner-up	2.	1995	Grand Prix	(Scotland) Stephen Hendry	5–9	
Winner	4.	1995	German Open	(Republic of Ireland) Ken Doherty	9–3	
Winner	5.	1996	International Open (2)	(England) Rod Lawler	9–3	
Runner-up	3.	1996	British Open	(England) Nigel Bond	8–9	
Runner-up	4.	1996	UK Championship	(Scotland) Stephen Hendry	9–10	
Winner	6.	1997	European Open	(England) John Parrott	9–5	
Runner-up	5.	1997	Grand Prix (2)	(Wales) Dominic Dale	6–9	
Winner	7.	1997	German Open (2)	(England) John Parrott	9–4	
Runner-up	6.	1998	Welsh Open (2)	(England) Paul Hunter	5–9	
Runner-up	7.	1998	Scottish Open	(England) Ronnie O'Sullivan	5–9	
Winner	8.	1998	British Open (2)	(Scotland) Stephen Hendry	9–8	
Winner	9.	1998	World Snooker Championship	(Republic of Ireland) Ken Doherty	18–12	
Winner	10.	1998	UK Championship	(Wales) Matthew Stevens	10–6	
Winner	11.	1999	China International	(Scotland) Billy Snaddon	9–3	
Winner	12.	1999	Grand Prix (2)	(Wales) Mark Williams	9–8	
Winner	13.	2000	Welsh Open	(England) Stephen Lee	9–8	
Winner	14.	2000	UK Championship (2)	(Wales) Mark Williams	10–4	
Runner-up	8.	2001	World Snooker Championship	(England) Ronnie O'Sullivan	14–18	
Winner	15.	2001	British Open (3)	(Scotland) Graeme Dott	9–6	
Runner-up	9.	2003	Irish Masters	(England) Ronnie O'Sullivan	9–10	
Runner-up	10.	2003	LG Cup (3)	(Wales) Mark Williams	5–9	
Winner	16.	2004	British Open (4)	(Scotland) Stephen Maguire	9–6	
Winner	17.	2005	Grand Prix (3)	(England) Ronnie O'Sullivan	9–2	
Runner-up	11.	2006	Malta Cup (2)	(Republic of Ireland) Ken Doherty	8–9	
Runner-up	12.	2006	China Open	(Wales) Mark Williams	8–9	
Winner	18.	2007	World Snooker Championship (2)	(England) Mark Selby	18–13	
Winner	19.	2008	Grand Prix (4)	(Wales) Ryan Day	9–7	
Runner-up	13.	2009	China Open (2)	(England) Peter Ebdon	8–10	
Winner	20.	2009	World Snooker Championship (3)	(England) Shaun Murphy	18–9	
Runner-up	14.	2009	UK Championship (2)	(China) Ding Junhui	8–10	
Winner	21.	2010	Welsh Open (2)	(England) Ali Carter	9–4	
Winner	22.	2010	UK Championship (3)	(Wales) Mark Williams	10–9	
Winner	23.	2011	Welsh Open (3)	(Scotland) Stephen Maguire	9–6	
Winner	24.	2011	World Snooker Championship (4)	(England) Judd Trump	18–15	
Winner	25.	2012	Shanghai Masters	(England) Judd Trump	10–9	
Runner-up	15.	2013	Wuxi Classic	(Australia) Neil Robertson	7–10	
Winner	26.	2015	Welsh Open (4)	(England) Ben Woollaston	9–3	
Winner	27.	2015	Australian Goldfields Open	(England) Martin Gould	9–8	
Winner	28.	2015	International Championship	(England) David Gilbert	10–5	
Runner-up	16.	2016	Scottish Open (2)	(Hong Kong) Marco Fu	4–9	
Runner-up	17.	2017	World Snooker Championship (2)	(England) Mark Selby	15–18	
Winner	29.	2017	Indian Open	(Scotland) Anthony McGill	5–1	
Winner	30.	2018	Welsh Open (5)	(England) Barry Hawkins	9–7	
Runner-up	18.	2018	World Snooker Championship (3)	(Wales) Mark Williams	16–18	
Runner-up	19.	2018	China Championship	(England) Mark Selby	9–10	
Runner-up	20.	2019	World Snooker Championship (4)	(England) Judd Trump	9–18	
Winner	31.	2021	Players Championship	(England) Ronnie O'Sullivan	10–3	
Runner-up	21.	2021	Northern Ireland Open	(Northern Ireland) Mark Allen	8–9	
Runner-up	22.	2021	English Open	(Australia) Neil Robertson	8–9	
Runner-up	23.	2021	Scottish Open (3)	(Belgium) Luca Brecel	5–9	
Runner-up	24.	2022	Tour Championship	(Australia) Neil Robertson	9–10	
Runner-up	25.	2024	British Open (2)	(England) Mark Selby	5–10	
Winner	32.	2025	World Open (5)	(England) Joe O'Connor	10–6	
Winner	33.	2025	Tour Championship	(England) Mark Selby	10–8	
Runner-up	26.	2025	International Championship	(China) Wu Yize	6–10	
Runner-up	27.	2026	Players Championship	(China) Zhao Xintong	7–10	
Runner-up	28.	2026	International Championship (2)	(England) Kyren Wilson	8–10	

=== Minor-ranking finals: 6 (3 titles) ===
Outcome	No.	Year	Championship	Opponent in the final	Score	Ref.
Winner	1.	2010	Ruhr Championship	(England) Shaun Murphy	4–2	
Runner-up	1.	2010	Prague Classic	(England) Michael Holt	3–4	
Runner-up	2.	2011	Players Tour Championship – Event 5	(England) Andrew Higginson	1–4	
Winner	2.	2012	Kay Suzanne Memorial Trophy	(England) Judd Trump	4–2	
Runner-up	3.	2012	Bulgarian Open	(England) Judd Trump	0–4	
Winner	3.	2013	Bulgarian Open	(Australia) Neil Robertson	4–1	

=== Non-ranking finals: 44 (21 titles) ===
Legend
The Masters (2–4)
Champion of Champions (1–1)
Premier League (1–3)
Other (17–15)

Outcome	No.	Year	Championship	Opponent in the final	Score	Ref.
Winner	1.	1994	Australian Open	(England) Willie Thorne	9–5	
Runner-up	1.	1995	The Masters	(England) Ronnie O'Sullivan	3–9	
Runner-up	2.	1995	Malta Grand Prix	(England) Peter Ebdon	4–7	
Runner-up	3.	1996	Charity Challenge	(England) Ronnie O'Sullivan	6–9	
Runner-up	4.	1997	Malta Grand Prix (2)	(Republic of Ireland) Ken Doherty	5–7	
Winner	2.	1998	Charity Challenge	(England) Ronnie O'Sullivan	9–8	
Runner-up	5.	1998	Champions Super League	(Scotland) Stephen Hendry	Round-robin	
Runner-up	6.	1998	Scottish Masters	(England) Ronnie O'Sullivan	7–9	
Winner	3.	1999	The Masters	(Republic of Ireland) Ken Doherty	10–8	
Winner	4.	1999	Charity Challenge (2)	(England) Ronnie O'Sullivan	9–4	
Winner	5.	1999	Premier League	(England) Jimmy White	9–4	
Runner-up	7.	1999	Scottish Masters (2)	(Wales) Matthew Stevens	7–9	
Winner	6.	2000	Irish Masters	(Scotland) Stephen Hendry	9–4	
Winner	7.	2001	Champions Cup	(Wales) Mark Williams	7–4	
Winner	8.	2001	Scottish Masters	(England) Ronnie O'Sullivan	9–6	
Winner	9.	2002	Irish Masters (2)	(England) Peter Ebdon	10–3	
Runner-up	8.	2002	Premier League	(England) Ronnie O'Sullivan	4–9	
Runner-up	9.	2002	Scottish Masters (3)	(England) Ronnie O'Sullivan	4–9	
Runner-up	10.	2004	Premier League (2)	(Scotland) Stephen Hendry	6–9	
Runner-up	11.	2004	World Champions v Asia Stars Challenge	(Hong Kong) Marco Fu	1–5	
Runner-up	12.	2005	The Masters (2)	(England) Ronnie O'Sullivan	3–10	
Winner	10.	2006	The Masters (2)	(England) Ronnie O'Sullivan	10–9	
Runner-up	13.	2006	Pot Black	(Wales) Mark Williams	0–1	
Runner-up	14.	2007	Warsaw Snooker Tour	(England) Mark Selby	3–5	
Winner	11.	2007	Euro-Asia Masters Challenge	(Thailand) James Wattana	5–4	
Runner-up	15.	2007	Premier League (3)	(England) Ronnie O'Sullivan	4–7	
Winner	12.	2008	World Series of Snooker Jersey	(England) Mark Selby	6–3	
Winner	13.	2008	World Series of Snooker Moscow	(China) Ding Junhui	5–0	
Runner-up	16.	2009	World Series of Snooker Grand Final	(England) Shaun Murphy	2–6	
Winner	14.	2011	Hainan Classic	(England) Jamie Cope	7–2	
Winner	15.	2011	Scottish Professional Championship	(Scotland) Anthony McGill	6–1	
Winner	16.	2016	China Championship	(England) Stuart Bingham	10–7	
Winner	17.	2016	Champion of Champions	(England) Ronnie O'Sullivan	10–7	
Winner	18.	2017	Championship League	(Wales) Ryan Day	3–0	
Winner	19.	2018	Championship League (2)	(China) Zhou Yuelong	3–2	
Runner-up	17.	2019	Six-red World Championship	(Scotland) Stephen Maguire	6–8	
Runner-up	18.	2021	The Masters (3)	(China) Yan Bingtao	8–10	
Runner-up	19.	2021	Champion of Champions	(England) Judd Trump	4–10	
Winner	20.	2022	Championship League Invitational (3)	(England) Stuart Bingham	3–2	
Winner	21.	2023	Championship League Invitational (4)	(England) Judd Trump	3–1	
Runner-up	20.	2023	Huangguoshu Open	(England) Judd Trump	1–5	
Runner-up	21.	2025	Snooker 900 – Crucible Cup	(Australia) Neil Robertson	5–7	
Runner-up	22.	2026	The Masters (4)	(England) Kyren Wilson	6–10	
Runner-up	23.	2026	John Virgo Trophy	(England) Ronnie O'Sullivan	0–6	

=== Team finals: 5 (3 titles) ===
Outcome	No.	Year	Championship	Team/partner	Opponent(s) in the final	Score	Ref.
Winner	1.	1996	World Cup	Scotland	(Republic of Ireland) Ireland	10–7	
Runner-up	1.	1999	Nations Cup	Scotland	Wales	4–6	
Winner	2.	2001	Nations Cup	Scotland	(Republic of Ireland) Ireland	6–2	
Runner-up	2.	2015	World Cup	Scotland	China B	1–4	
Winner	3.	2019	World Cup (2)	Scotland	China B	4–0	

=== Pro-am finals: 1 (1 title) ===
Outcome	No.	Year	Championship	Opponent in the final	Score	Ref.
Winner	1.	2008	Scottish Open Snooker Championship	(Scotland) Marcus Campbell	5–4	

=== Amateur finals: 5 (4 titles) ===
Outcome	No.	Year	Championship	Opponent in the final	Score	Ref.
Winner	1.	1990	Scottish Under-16 Championship	(Scotland) Jamie Burnett	5–2	
Winner	2.	1991	Scottish Under-18 Championship	(Scotland) Scott Bigham	5–2	
Winner	3.	1991	Mita/Sky World Masters – Junior (U16)	(Wales) Mark Williams	6–1	
Runner-up	1.	1991	British Under-16 Championship	(Wales) Mark Williams	0–4	
Winner	4.	1992	Scottish Under-18 Championship (2)	(Scotland) Scott Bigham	5–0	
