= 1998 Charity Challenge =

Tournament information
- Dates: 26 February – 1 March 1998
- Venue: Assembly Rooms
- City: Derby
- Country: England
- Organisation: WPBSA
- Format: Non-ranking event
- Total prize fund: £130,000
- Winner's share: £30,000
- Highest break: Ronnie O'Sullivan (ENG) (141)

Final
- Champion: (Scotland) John Higgins
- Runner-up: (England) Ronnie O'Sullivan
- Score: 9–8

The 1998 Liverpool Victoria Charity Challenge was the fourth edition of the professional invitational snooker tournament, which took place between 26 February and 1 March 1998. The tournament was played at the Assembly Rooms in Derby, and featured twelve professional players.

John Higgins won the title, beating Ronnie O'Sullivan 9–8 in the final.

== Main draw ==
Round 1 Best of 9 Frames
(England) John Parrott | 5
(Wales) Lee Walker | 0
(England) Steve Davis | 5
(England) Nigel Bond | 4
(England) Ronnie O'Sullivan | 5
(Malta) Tony Drago | 1
(England) Jimmy White | 5
(England) Peter Ebdon | 4

Quarter-finals; Best of 9 Frames
(Scotland) John Higgins | 5
(England) John Parrott | 4
(Republic of Ireland) Ken Doherty | 5
(England) Steve Davis | 4
(Wales) Mark Williams | 4
(England) Ronnie O'Sullivan | 5
(Scotland) Stephen Hendry | 5
(England) Jimmy White | 4

Semi-finals; Best of 11 Frames
(Scotland) John Higgins | 6
(Republic of Ireland) Ken Doherty | 5
(England) Ronnie O'Sullivan | 6
(Scotland) Stephen Hendry | 4

Final; Best of 17 Frames
(Scotland) John Higgins | 9
(England) Ronnie O'Sullivan | 8

== Final ==
Final: Best of 17 frames. Assembly Rooms, Derby, England, 1 March 1998.
| John Higgins; Scotland | 9–8 | Ronnie O'Sullivan; England |
Afternoon: 79–4 (79), 85–6 (85), 21–74 (74), 70–53, 16–101 (62), 0–98 (98), 52–68, 77–16 (64); Evening: 66–26, 96–0 (79), 65–0 (57), 66–70 (66, 70), 24–64, 67–39 (54), 0–67 (67), 1–74, 84–1 (61)
| 85 | Highest break | 98 |
| 0 | Century breaks | 0 |
| 8 | 50+ breaks | 5 |
