= 1997 German Open (snooker) =

Tournament information
- Dates: 8–14 December 1997
- Venue: Atlantis Rheinhotel
- City: Bingen am Rhein
- Country: Germany
- Organisation: WPBSA
- Format: Ranking event
- Total prize fund: £280,000
- Winner's share: £50,000
- Highest break: Stephen Hendry (SCO) (130)

Final
- Champion: John Higgins (SCO)
- Runner-up: John Parrott (ENG)
- Score: 9–4

The 1997 German Open was a professional ranking snooker tournament that took place between 8 and 14 December 1997 at the Atlantis Rheinhotel in Bingen am Rhein, Germany. It was the third edition of the tournament, with 16 players competing in the final stage. John Higgins won the event for the second time, defeating John Parrott 9–4 in the final.

== Summary ==
Three of the four quarter-finals went to the final frame. John Higgins beat Anthony Hamilton 5–4. Ronnie O'Sullivan beat Tony Drago by the same score after fluking the final black. Ken Doherty also beat Jamie Burnett in the final frame, having been 1–3 down. John Parrott beat Stephen Hendry 5–3 in the other match. Hendry won the third frame to take a 2–1 lead, despite need two snookers. Parrott won the next two frames, winning the fifth frame with a break of 103. Hendry then won the next frame with a break of 130, his 400th in professional competition, before Parrott won frames seven and eight to win the match.

In the semi-finals John Higgins beat Ronnie O'Sullivan 6–4, with John Parrott beating Ken Doherty by the same score. In the final, Higgins led 5–3 lead after the first session, despite Parrott making a break of 102 in frame 7. Higgins then won the first three frames in the evening session to lead 8–3. Parrott won frame 12 but Higgins finished the match with a break of 105 in the next frame, winning the first prize of £50,000. Stephen Hendry won the high break prize for his break of 130 in the quarter-finals.

== Main draw ==
Last 16; Best of 9 frames
1	Ronnie O'Sullivan (ENG)	5
12	James Wattana (THA)	2
11	Tony Drago (MLT)	5
Quinten Hann (AUS)	3
Jason Ferguson (ENG)	2
14	Anthony Hamilton (ENG)	5
Martin Clark (ENG)	2
3	John Higgins (SCO)	5
2	Stephen Hendry (SCO)	5
Jimmy White (ENG)	2
16	Stephen Lee (ENG)	3
7	John Parrott (ENG)	5
Gary Wilkinson (ENG)	4
Jamie Burnett (SCO)	5
Shokat Ali (PAK)	2
4	Ken Doherty (IRL)	5

Quarter-finals; Best of 9 frames
1	(England) Ronnie O'Sullivan	5
11	(Malta) Tony Drago	4
14	(England) Anthony Hamilton	4
3	(Scotland) John Higgins	5
2	(Scotland) Stephen Hendry	3
7	(England) John Parrott	5
(Scotland) Jamie Burnett	4
4	(Republic of Ireland) Ken Doherty	5

Semi-finals; Best of 11 frames
1	(England) Ronnie O'Sullivan	4
3	(Scotland) John Higgins	6
7	(England) John Parrott	6
4	(Republic of Ireland) Ken Doherty	4

Final; Best of 17 frames
3	(Scotland) John Higgins	9
7	(England) John Parrott	4

=== Final ===
Final: Best of 11 frames. Atlantis Rheinhotel, Bingen am Rhein, Germany, 14 December 1997.
John Higgins; Scotland	9–4	John Parrott; England
First session: 83–28, 1–92 (86), 14–67, 69–21, 72–44, 57–27, 0–102 (102), 59–48; Second session: 80–5 (80), 80–49 (54), 80–14, 53–67, 109–25 (105)
105	Highest break	102
1	Century breaks	1
3	50+ breaks	2

== Qualifying ==
Qualifying was held at the Hereford Leisure Centre in Hereford in September 1997.

=== Final qualifying round ===
Ronnie O'Sullivan (ENG)	5–1	Graeme Dott (SCO)
James Wattana (THA)	5–4	Dave Harold (ENG)
Tony Drago (MLT)	5–4	Steve James (ENG)
Mark Williams (WAL)	3–5	Quinten Hann (AUS)
Peter Ebdon (ENG)	1–5	Jason Ferguson (ENG)
Anthony Hamilton (ENG)	5–3	Ian McCulloch (ENG)
Steve Davis (ENG)	3–5	Martin Clark (ENG)
John Higgins (SCO)	5–0	Brian Morgan (ENG)

Stephen Hendry (SCO)	5–0	Paul Wykes (ENG)
Alan McManus (SCO)	2–5	Jimmy White (ENG)
Stephen Lee (ENG)	5–3	Chris Small (SCO)
John Parrott (ENG)	5–2	Lee Walker (WAL)
Nigel Bond (ENG)	3–5	Gary Wilkinson (ENG)
Alain Robidoux (CAN)	1–5	Jamie Burnett (SCO)
Darren Morgan (WAL)	2–5	Shokat Ali (PAK)
Ken Doherty (IRL)	5–3	Billy Snaddon (SCO)
