= 1995 Masters (snooker) =

Professional non-ranking snooker tournament, Feb 1995

1995 Benson & Hedges Masters
Tournament information
- Dates: 5–12 February 1995
- Venue: Wembley Conference Centre
- City: London
- Country: England
- Organisation: WPBSA
- Format: Non-ranking event
- Winner's share: £120,000
- Highest break: Stephen Hendry (SCO) (141)

Final
- Champion: Ronnie O'Sullivan (ENG)
- Runner-up: John Higgins (SCO)
- Score: 9–3

The 1995 Masters (officially the 1995 Benson & Hedges Masters) is a professional non-ranking snooker tournament that took place between 5 and 12 February 1995 at the Wembley Conference Centre in London, England.

The wild-card players were John Higgins, who had won the 1994 Grand Prix, and Mark Williams, who won the 1994 Benson & Hedges Championship. Both of them were 19 years old. Higgins went on to reach the final.

Ronnie O'Sullivan defeated Higgins 9–3 in the final to become the youngest ever Masters champion aged 19 years and 69 days. This still remains a record. Stephen Hendry meanwhile failed to make the final for the first time in his Masters career, losing to Peter Ebdon 4–5 in the quarter-finals.

== Overview ==
The Masters is an invitational snooker tournament that was first held in 1975, with the top-16 players from the snooker world rankings as well as the winner of the Benson & Hedges Championship and a wild card entrant invited to participate for the 1995 competition. It is one of the three Triple Crown events in the game of snooker; the others being the World Snooker Championship and the UK Championship. As an invitational event, it carried no world ranking points. The 1995 Masters was the 21st holding of the event, and took place at the Wembley Conference Centre from 5 to 12 February 1995.

Sponsored by the tobacco company Benson & Hedges, the total prize fund was £435,000 with £120,000 being awarded to the winner. The tournament was broadcast in the United Kingdom on BBC Television. Every match was played as best-of-nine frames, before the semi-finals were played as best-of-11 frames, and the final was the best-of-17 frames. Scottish player and World Champion Stephen Hendry was installed as the favourite to win the tournament.

== Field ==
Defending champion Alan McManus was the number 1 seed with World Champion Stephen Hendry seeded 2. Places were allocated to the top 16 players in the world rankings. Players seeded 15 and 16 played in the wild-card round against the winner of the qualifying event, Mark Williams (ranked 58), and John Higgins (ranked 51), who was the wild-card selection. Tony Drago, John Higgins, Joe Swail and Mark Williams were making their debuts in the Masters.

== Wild-card round ==
In the preliminary round the wild-card players played the 15th and 16th seeds:

Match	Date		Score	
WC1	Monday 6 February	Willie Thorne (ENG) (15)	0–5	Mark Williams (WAL)
WC2	Sunday 5 February	Tony Drago (MLT) (16)	3–5	John Higgins (SCO)

== Main draw ==
Last 16; Best of 9 frames
1	Alan McManus (SCO)	5
13	David Roe (ENG)	3
8	Darren Morgan (WAL)	2
John Higgins (SCO)	5
5	Jimmy White (ENG)	5
12	Joe Swail (NIR)	2
4	James Wattana (THA)	5
Mark Williams (WAL)	4
3	Steve Davis (ENG)	3
14	Terry Griffiths (WAL)	5
6	John Parrott (ENG)	4
9	Ronnie O'Sullivan (ENG)	5
7	Ken Doherty (IRL)	3
10	Peter Ebdon (ENG)	5
2	Stephen Hendry (SCO)	5
11	Nigel Bond (ENG)	1

Quarter-finals; Best of 9 frames
1	(Scotland) Alan McManus	2
(Scotland) John Higgins	5
5	(England) Jimmy White	5
4	(Thailand) James Wattana	3
14	(Wales) Terry Griffiths	2
9	(England) Ronnie O'Sullivan	5
10	(England) Peter Ebdon	5
2	(Scotland) Stephen Hendry	4

Semi-finals; Best of 11 frames
(Scotland) John Higgins	6
5	(England) Jimmy White	1
9	(England) Ronnie O'Sullivan	6
10	(England) Peter Ebdon	4

Final; Best of 17 frames
(Scotland) John Higgins	3
9	(England) Ronnie O'Sullivan	9

=== Final ===
Final: Best of 17 frames. Referee: John Street; Wembley Conference Centre, London, England, 12 February 1995.
John Higgins; Scotland	3–9	Ronnie O'Sullivan (9); England
Afternoon: 64–52, 50–63, 9–74 (68), 5–67, 36–65 (53), 0–82 (82), 117–4 (73), 0–82 (55); Evening: 7–88, 91–0 (91), 47–84, 19–73 (57)
91	Highest break	82
0	Century breaks	0
2	50+ breaks	5

== Qualifying ==
Mark Williams won the qualifying tournament, known as the 1994 Benson & Hedges Championship at the time.

== Century breaks ==
There were a total of 13 century breaks made by a total of 8 players during the tournament's main stage.

- 141, 112 – Stephen Hendry
- 132 – Tony Drago
- 131, 129, 103 – Peter Ebdon
- 125 – Terry Griffiths
- 111, 106, 104 – John Higgins
- 104 – Darren Morgan
- 104 – Alan McManus
- 102 – Ronnie O'Sullivan

Tony Drago's century and John Higgins's 106 were scored in the wild-card round.
