= 2002 Premier League Snooker =

Daily Star Premier League
Tournament information
- Dates: 5 January – 12 May 2002
- Country: United Kingdom
- Organisation: Matchroom Sport
- Format: Non-ranking event
- Highest break: 137

Final
- Champion: (England) Ronnie O'Sullivan
- Runner-up: (Scotland) John Higgins
- Score: 9–4

The 2002 Daily Star Premier League was a professional non-ranking snooker tournament that was played from 5 January to 12 May 2002.

Ronnie O'Sullivan won in the final 9–4 against John Higgins.

== League phase ==
Ranking		(England) OSU	(Scotland) HIG	(Wales) WIL	(England) WHI	(Wales) STE	(England) DAV	(Thailand) WAT	Frame W-L	Match W-D-L	Pld-Pts
1	Ronnie O'Sullivan	x	5	2	7	5	5	8	33–15	5–0–1	6–10
2	John Higgins	3	x	2	5	5	5	6	25–23	4–0–2	6–8
3	Mark Williams	6	6	x	4	3	4	4	27–21	2–3–1	6–7
4	Jimmy White	1	3	4	x	5	4	6	23–25	2–2–2	6–6
5	Matthew Stevens	3	3	5	3	x	5	4	23–25	2–1–3	6–5
6	Steve Davis	3	3	4	4	3	x	4	21–27	0–3–3	6–3
7	James Wattana	0	2	4	2	4	4	x	16–32	0–3–3	6–3

Top four qualified for the play-offs. If points were level then most frames won determined their positions. If two players had an identical record then the result in their match determined their positions. If that ended 4–4 then the player who got to four first was higher.

(Breaks above 50 shown between (parentheses), century breaks are indicated with bold.)

- 5 January – Brangwyn Hall, Swansea, Wales
  - Ronnie O'Sullivan 5–3 Matthew Stevens → (90)-0, (59) 90–11, 0-(74), 54- 17, 0-(124), 23–72, (60) 66–0, 87–1
  - Mark Williams 4–4 Jimmy White → 35–59, 0-(99), 0-(84), (93)-6, (126)-6, (69) 84–12, (61) 78–28, 43–72
  - Ronnie O'Sullivan 6–2 John Higgins → (102)-7, (94) 95–28, (75) 89–36, 0-(83), (54) 68–1, 0-(96), (103)-8, (113) – 6
- 6 January -Brangwyn Hall, Swansea, Wales
  - Matthew Stevens 4–4 James Wattana → 67–37, 65-(63), 43–74, (60) 77–31, 25–74, 80–35, 42–75, 24–45
  - John Higgins 5–3 Steve Davis → (68)-(65), 41–84 (60), (84) 88–0, 29-(61), 77–18, (66)-8, 68–36, 4–80
  - Mark Williams 4–4 James Wattana → (51) 59–2, (64)-65, 69–46, (40) 52–78 (54), 64–35, (67) 116–0, 53–76 (63), 16–63
- 19 January – Floral Hall, Southport, England
  - Jimmy White 6-2 James Wattana → (56) 80–0, 48–50, (82) 88–4, 63–38, (56)-63, 62–22, (52) 63–28, (60) 81–29
  - Mark Williams 4–4 Steve Davis → (68) 97–8, (54) 83–53, 67–0, 4–84 (59), 18–85 (69), (93) 94–0, 51–69, 0–81 (65)
- 20 January – Floral Hall, Southport, England
  - Ronnie O'Sullivan 8–0 James Wattana → 60–32, (81)-33, (75) 77–7, (69)-(59), 69–66 (62), (96)-0, (60) 77–0, (68) 75–16
  - John Higgins 5–3 Matthew Stevens → (129)-0, (84)-0, (69) 70–6, 0-(78), 0–98 (97), 56–34, 56–46, 0–97 (74)
  - Ronnie O'Sullivan 5–3 Steve Davis → 96–31, (77)-0, (52) 72–29, (75) 79–0, 62–70, 40–70, (54) 64–15, 0-(131)
- 16 February – The Pavilion, Flint, Wales
  - Steve Davis 4–4 James Wattana → 6–78, 56–34, (64) 71-(54), 14–71, 10–72, 56–45, (62) 98–5, 22–82 (77)
  - Ronnie O'Sullivan 2–6 Mark Williams → 82–0, 0-(76), 0–110 (57, 54), 8–71, 32-(105), 53–66 (54), 22-(70), (89)-0
- 17 February – The Pavilion, Flint, Wales
  - Matthew Stevens 5–3 Steve Davis → 62–28, 37–65 (54), (102) 103–28, (69) 70–26, 0-(97), 44–73, (125) 133- 5, (74) 79–0
  - John Higgins 6–2 James Wattana → (137)-0, (90) 103–2, (60) 81–7, (57)-7, 0-(106), 74–40, 31–63, 67–27
  - Jimmy White 4–4 Steve Davis → (63) 89–42, 71–69 (53), 0–91 (54), 14–73, 14–59, 64–7, (50) 69–1, 30–69 (60)
- 16 March – Mansfield Leisure Centre, Mansfield, England
  - Matthew Stevens 3–5 Jimmy White → (64)-53 (52), 8–118 (79), 71–37, 60–9, 0–77, 18–114 (82), 63–72, 54 – 72
  - Mark Williams 6–2 John Higgins → (126)-4, 46–71 (70), 25–78 (70), (63) 67–1, (54) 61–12, (132)-0, (125)-0, (67)-46
- 17 March – Mansfield Leisure Centre, Mansfield, England
  - Ronnie O'Sullivan 7–1 Jimmy White → 69–9, (106)-30, 65–25, (105)-0, (104)-0, (50) 75–25, 54–50, 1–71
  - Mark Williams 3–5 Matthew Stevens → 30–84, (66) 67–14, 32–72, 37–86 (68), 58–10, 37–57, 25–67, (65) 105- 0
  - John Higgins 5–3 Jimmy White → 45–67, (71)-(66), 7–67, 61–1, (66) 67–22, 64–56, (56)-14, 42–69 (64)

== Play-offs ==
10–11 May – Rothes Halls, Glenrothes, Scotland

Semi-finals; Best of 11 frames
1	(England) Ronnie O'Sullivan*	6
4	(England) Jimmy White	2
2	(Scotland) John Higgins**	6
3	(Wales) Mark Williams	1

Final; Best of 17 frames
1	(England) Ronnie O'Sullivan***	9
2	(Scotland) John Higgins	4

*(77) 93–6, 37–67, (62) 70–20, (57) 79–0, (91) 108–17, 69–9, (60) 62–9
**(65) 75–33, 68–55, 59–23, (126)-0, 0-(81), (85) 112–6, 1–76 (72), (60) 73–0
***(60) 109–6, 45–56, (72) 75–42, 5–78 (55), (68) 73–0, (109) 115–19, 43–66, (110) 111–14, (70)-0, 38–89 (76), (95)-30, 63–14, (62) 106–16

== Century breaks ==
- 137, 129, 126 – John Higgins
- 131 – Steve Davis
- 132, 126, 126, 125, 105 – Mark Williams
- 125, 124, 102 – Matthew Stevens
- 113, 110, 109, 106, 105, 104, 103, 102 – Ronnie O'Sullivan
- 106 – James Wattana
