= 1994 Malta Grand Prix =

Malta Grand Prix
Tournament information
- Dates: 28 November–4 December 1994
- Venue: Jerma Palace Hotel
- City: Valletta
- Country: Malta
- Organisation: WPBSA
- Format: Non-ranking event
- Winner's share: £4,000

Final
- Champion: (England) John Parrott
- Runner-up: (Malta) Tony Drago
- Score: 7–6

The 1994 Malta Grand Prix was the first edition of the professional invitational snooker tournament, which took place from 28 November to 4 December 1994. The tournament was played at the Jerma Palace Hotel in Valletta, Malta.

John Parrott won the title, defeating Tony Drago 7–6 in the final.

== Main draw ==
Round 1 Best of 9 frames
(England) Willie Thorne	5
(Wales) Paul Davies	3
(England) Tony Knowles	5
(Malta) Alex Borg	3
(England) Joe Johnson	5
(Malta) Joe Grech	3
(England) Allison Fisher	5
(Northern Ireland) Gerard Greene	4

Quarter-finals; Best of 9 frames
(England) John Parrott	5
(England) Willie Thorne	3
(England) Peter Ebdon	5
(England) Tony Knowles	2
(Malta) Tony Drago	5
(England) Joe Johnson	3
(Northern Ireland) Joe Swail	5
(England) Allison Fisher	1

Semi-finals; Best of 11 frames
(England) John Parrott	6
(England) Peter Ebdon	5
(Malta) Tony Drago	6
(Northern Ireland) Joe Swail	1

Final; Best of 13 frames
(England) John Parrott	7
(Malta) Tony Drago	6
