= 1997 Malta Grand Prix =

Malta Grand Prix
Tournament information
- Dates: 30 October – 2 November 1997
- Venue: Jerma Palace Hotel
- City: Marsaskala
- Country: Malta
- Organisation: WPBSA
- Format: Non-ranking event
- Winner's share: £6,000

Final
- Champion: (Republic of Ireland) Ken Doherty
- Runner-up: (Scotland) John Higgins
- Score: 7–5

The 1997 Rothmans Malta Grand Prix was the fourth edition of the professional invitational snooker tournament, which took place from 30 October to 2 November 1997. The tournament was played at the Jerma Palace Hotel in Marsaskala, Malta.

Ken Doherty won the title, defeating John Higgins 7–5 in the final.

== Main draw ==
Quarter-finals; Best of 9 frames
1	(Republic of Ireland) Ken Doherty	5
8	(Malta) Joe Grech	4
4	(Malta) Tony Drago	5
5	(Canada) Alain Robidoux	1
2	(Scotland) John Higgins	5
7	(England) Nigel Bond	4
3	(Malta) Alex Borg	5
6	(Wales) Mark Williams	3

Semi-finals; Best of 11 frames
(Republic of Ireland) Ken Doherty	6
(Malta) Tony Drago	2
(Scotland) John Higgins	6
(Malta) Alex Borg	4

Final; Best of 13 frames
(Republic of Ireland) Ken Doherty	7
(Scotland) John Higgins	5
