= 1995 Malta Grand Prix =

Malta Grand Prix
Tournament information
- Dates: 30 October – 5 November 1995
- Venue: Jerma Palace Hotel
- City: Marsaskala
- Country: Malta
- Organisation: WPBSA
- Format: Non-ranking event
- Total prize fund: £16,000
- Winner's share: £4,000
- Highest break: Tony Drago (MLT) (134)

Final
- Champion: (England) Peter Ebdon
- Runner-up: (Scotland) John Higgins
- Score: 7–4

The 1995 Rothmans Malta Grand Prix was the second edition of the professional invitational snooker tournament, which took place from 30 October to 5 November 1995. The tournament was played at the Jerma Palace Hotel in Marsaskala, Malta.

Peter Ebdon won the title, defeating John Higgins 7–4 in the final.

== Main draw ==
Round 1 Best of 9 frames
(England) Dave Harold	5
(Malta) Paul Mifsud	3
(England) David Roe	5
(Malta) Joe Grech	3
(Scotland) John Higgins	5
(Malta) Simon Camilleri	0
(Malta) Alex Borg	5
(England) Nigel Bond	4

Quarter-finals; Best of 9 frames
(England) Peter Ebdon	5
(England) Dave Harold	0
(Republic of Ireland) Ken Doherty	5
(England) David Roe	0
(Malta) Tony Drago	3
(Scotland) John Higgins	5
(Wales) Darren Morgan	5
(Malta) Alex Borg	3

Semi-finals; Best of 11 frames
(England) Peter Ebdon	6
(Republic of Ireland) Ken Doherty	1
(Scotland) John Higgins	6
(Wales) Darren Morgan	2

Final; Best of 13 frames
(England) Peter Ebdon	7
(Scotland) John Higgins	4

== Century breaks ==
- 134 – Tony Drago
- 133 – Darren Morgan
- 123 – Ken Doherty
