= 1998 Malta Grand Prix =

Malta Grand Prix
Tournament information
- Dates: 3–6 December 1998
- Venue: New Dolman Hotel
- City: Buġibba
- Country: Malta
- Organisation: WPBSA
- Format: Non-Ranking event
- Total prize fund: £20,000
- Winner's share: £6,000
- Highest break: 104 (Ken Doherty)

Final
- Champion: (Scotland) Stephen Hendry
- Runner-up: (Republic of Ireland) Ken Doherty
- Score: 7–6

The 1998 Malta Grand Prix was a professional invitational snooker tournament which took place at the New Dolmen Hotel in Buġibba, Malta in December 1998.

Stephen Hendry won the tournament, defeating Ken Doherty 7–6 in the final. The highest break, a 104, was compiled by Doherty in his quarter-final match against Jimmy White.

== Prize fund ==
The breakdown of prize money for this year is shown below:

- Winner £6,000
- Runner-up £3,000
- Highest break £1,000
- Total £20,000

== Main draw ==
Quarter-finals; Best of 9 frames
(Republic of Ireland) Ken Doherty	5
(England) Jimmy White	4
(Wales) Mark Williams	5
(Malta) Tony Drago	4
(Scotland) Stephen Hendry	5
(Malta) Joe Grech	1
(Scotland) John Higgins	2
(Malta) Alex Borg	5

Semi-finals; Best of 11 frames
(Republic of Ireland) Ken Doherty	6
(Wales) Mark Williams	2
(Scotland) Stephen Hendry	6
(Malta) Alex Borg	2

Final; Best of 13 frames
(Republic of Ireland) Ken Doherty	6
(Scotland) Stephen Hendry	7

== Century breaks ==
- 104, 100 – Ken Doherty
