= 1995 German Open (snooker) =

Tournament information
- Dates: 3–10 December 1995
- Venue: Messe Frankfurt
- City: Frankfurt
- Country: Germany
- Organisation: WPBSA
- Format: Ranking event
- Winner's share: £40,000
- Highest break: John Higgins (SCO) (139)

Final
- Champion: John Higgins (SCO)
- Runner-up: Ken Doherty (IRL)
- Score: 9–3

The 1995 German Open was a professional ranking snooker tournament that took place between 3 and 10 December 1995 at the Messe Frankfurt in Frankfurt, Germany. It was the first ranking event held in Germany. John Higgins won the inaugural event defeating Ken Doherty 9–3 in the final.

== Summary ==
The tournament involved the top 16 players in the world ranking who were joined by 16 qualifiers and 4 wild-card players. The four lowest ranked qualifiers played the wild-card players, winning all their four matches and advancing to the last-32. Four of the top-16 players lost in the last-32 round, including Ronnie O'Sullivan and Jimmy White. Further top-ranked players were beaten in the last-16 stage, including Steve Davis, John Parrott and James Wattana. Tony Drago led Stephen Hendry 3–1 but Hendry then won the next four frames to win the match 5–3.

Three Scots, Stephen Hendry, Alan McManus and John Higgins, won their quarter-final matches and were joined in the semi-finals by Ken Doherty. Hendry led Doherty 3–2 but Doherty then won the next four frames to win the match 6–5. In the other semi-final, Higgins beat McManus in the deciding frame after a break of 58. The final was level at three frame each before Higgins won the next six frames to win 9–3 and take the first prize of £40,000. Higgins made a break of 139 in the 11th frame of the final to win the high break prize of £5,000.

== Wildcard round ==
The four lowest ranked qualifiers played four continental players, three from Germany and one from Belgium.

Match		Score	
WC1	Dave Finbow (ENG)	5–1	Yvan van Velthoven (BEL)
WC2	Mark King (ENG)	5–0	Dieter Johns (GER)
WC3	Chris Small (SCO)	5–0	Thomas Schweser (GER)
WC4	Yasin Merchant (IND)	5–0	Peter Wagner (GER)

== Main draw ==
Last 32; Best of 9 frames
1	Stephen Hendry (SCO)	5
Joe Swail (NIR)	2
14	Tony Drago (MLT)	5
Mick Price (ENG)	1
15	Terry Griffiths (WAL)	0
Rod Lawler (ENG)	5
5	James Wattana (THA)	5
Gary Wilkinson (ENG)	3
7	Jimmy White (ENG)	3
Steve James (ENG)	5
13	Dave Harold (ENG)	1
Mark Bennett (WAL)	5
9	Ken Doherty (IRL)	5
Dean Reynolds (ENG)	3
4	John Parrott (ENG)	5
Martin Clark (ENG)	2
3	Ronnie O'Sullivan (ENG)	3
Mark King (ENG)	5
11	John Higgins (SCO)	5
Chris Small (SCO)	2
12	Nigel Bond (ENG)	5
Willie Thorne (ENG)	0
8	Darren Morgan (WAL)	5
Billy Snaddon (SCO)	4
6	Alan McManus (SCO)	5
Mark Williams (WAL)	1
10	Peter Ebdon (ENG)	5
Yasin Merchant (IND)	1
16	David Roe (ENG)	5
Neal Foulds (ENG)	3
2	Steve Davis (ENG)	5
Dave Finbow (ENG)	1

Last 16; Best of 9 frames
1	(Scotland) Stephen Hendry	5
14	(Malta) Tony Drago	3
(England) Rod Lawler	5
5	(Thailand) James Wattana	2
(England) Steve James	3
(Wales) Mark Bennett	5
9	(Republic of Ireland) Ken Doherty	5
4	(England) John Parrott	4
(England) Mark King	3
11	(Scotland) John Higgins	5
12	(England) Nigel Bond	1
8	(Wales) Darren Morgan	5
6	(Scotland) Alan McManus	5
10	(England) Peter Ebdon	4
16	(England) David Roe	5
(England) Steve Davis	4

Quarter-finals; Best of 9 frames
1	(Scotland) Stephen Hendry	5
(England) Rod Lawler	3
(Wales) Mark Bennett	2
9	(Republic of Ireland) Ken Doherty	5
11	(Scotland) John Higgins	5
8	(Wales) Darren Morgan	4
6	(Scotland) Alan McManus	5
16	(England) David Roe	3

Semi-finals; Best of 11 frames
1	(Scotland) Stephen Hendry	3
9	(Republic of Ireland) Ken Doherty	6
11	(Scotland) John Higgins	6
6	(Scotland) Alan McManus	5

Final; Best of 17 frames
9	(Republic of Ireland) Ken Doherty	3
11	(Scotland) John Higgins	9

=== Final ===
Final: Best of 17 frames. Messe Frankfurt, Frankfurt, Germany, 10 December 1995.
Ken Doherty (9); Ireland	3–9	John Higgins (11); Scotland
106–16 (105), 0–112 (70), 0–97 (97), 50–64 (50 Doherty), 55–8, 80–45 (80), 0–66, 10–73 (50), 42–77, 39–90 (50), 0–143 (139), 52–82
105	Highest break	139
1	Century breaks	1
5	50+ breaks	3
