= Tony Drago =

Maltese snooker and pool player

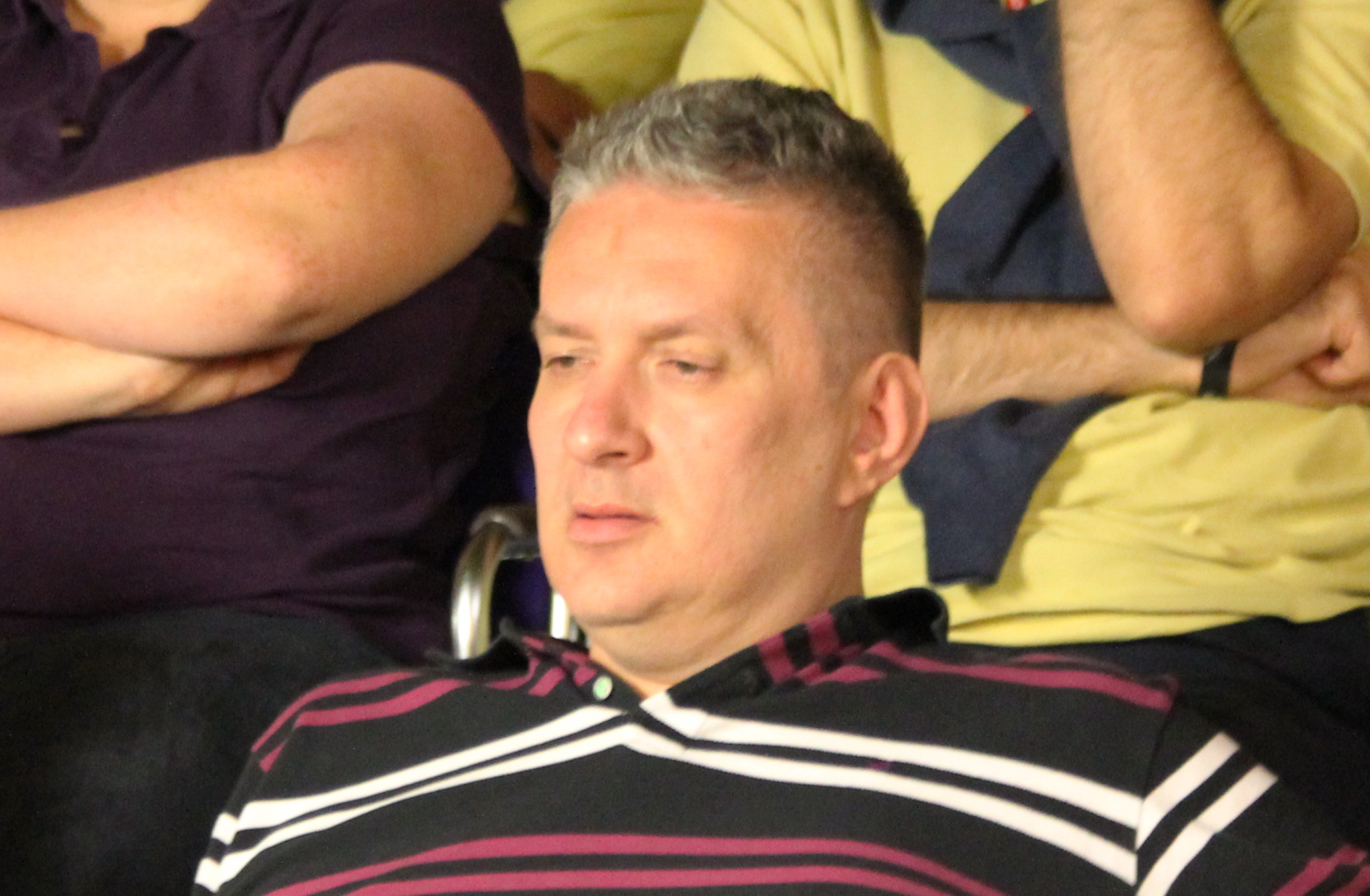
- Drago at the 2012 Paul Hunter Classic

Personal information
- Nickname: The Tornado
- Born: 22 September 1965 (age 61) Valletta, Malta

Sport
- Country: Malta
- Sport: Snooker
- Professional: 1985–2008, 2009–2016
- Highest ranking: 10 (1998/99)
- Maximum breaks: 1
- Century breaks: 132
- Best ranking finish: Runner-up (×1)

Tournament wins
- Minor-ranking: 1

Tony Drago (/ˈdreɪɡoʊ/ DRAY-goh; born 22 September 1965) is a Maltese former professional snooker and pool player.

Known for his speed around the table, during his snooker career he won two professional titles: the 1993 Strachan Challenge Event 3 and the 1996 Guangzhou Masters. He later switched his focus to pool and won the 2003 World Pool Masters beating Hsia Hui-kai 8–6 and the 2008 Predator International 10-ball Championship beating Francisco Bustamante 13–10.

== Snooker career ==
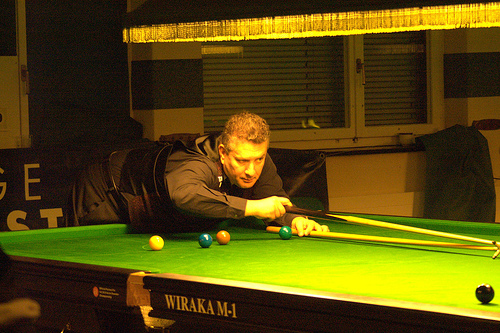
Drago playing during the Swiss Open in 2005

Drago's highest snooker world rankings position was number ten (in 1998). He has reached two major finals — the 1991 World Masters (losing to Jimmy White), and the 1997 International Open (losing to Stephen Hendry — Drago's only ranking event final, and his first run past the quarter-finals of any ranking event). He reached the quarter-finals of the World Championship in 1988. He has appeared in the tournament 11 further times, most recently in 2004/2005, with five further last-sixteen runs. He lost to Matthew Stevens in three successive years — 8–13 in the last 16 in 1999, 2–10 in the 2000 first round, and 1–10 in the 2001 first round.

After he failed to qualify for the 2004 World Championship, Drago's snooker form slumped. He dropped out of the top 32 of the rankings a year later, and, after losing to Issara Kachaiwong in his opening qualifier for the 2008 World Championship, he dropped off the tour.

In 2009, Drago won the EBSA International Open, which gave him the chance to return for the 2009–10 season. He reached the third qualifying round of the Shanghai Masters, Grand Prix, and 2009 UK Championship. He then qualified for the Welsh Open, where he played against Ryan Day in the first round, but lost 4–5. In the China Open, Drago qualified for the televised stages. As a result, his ranking rose to 54th.

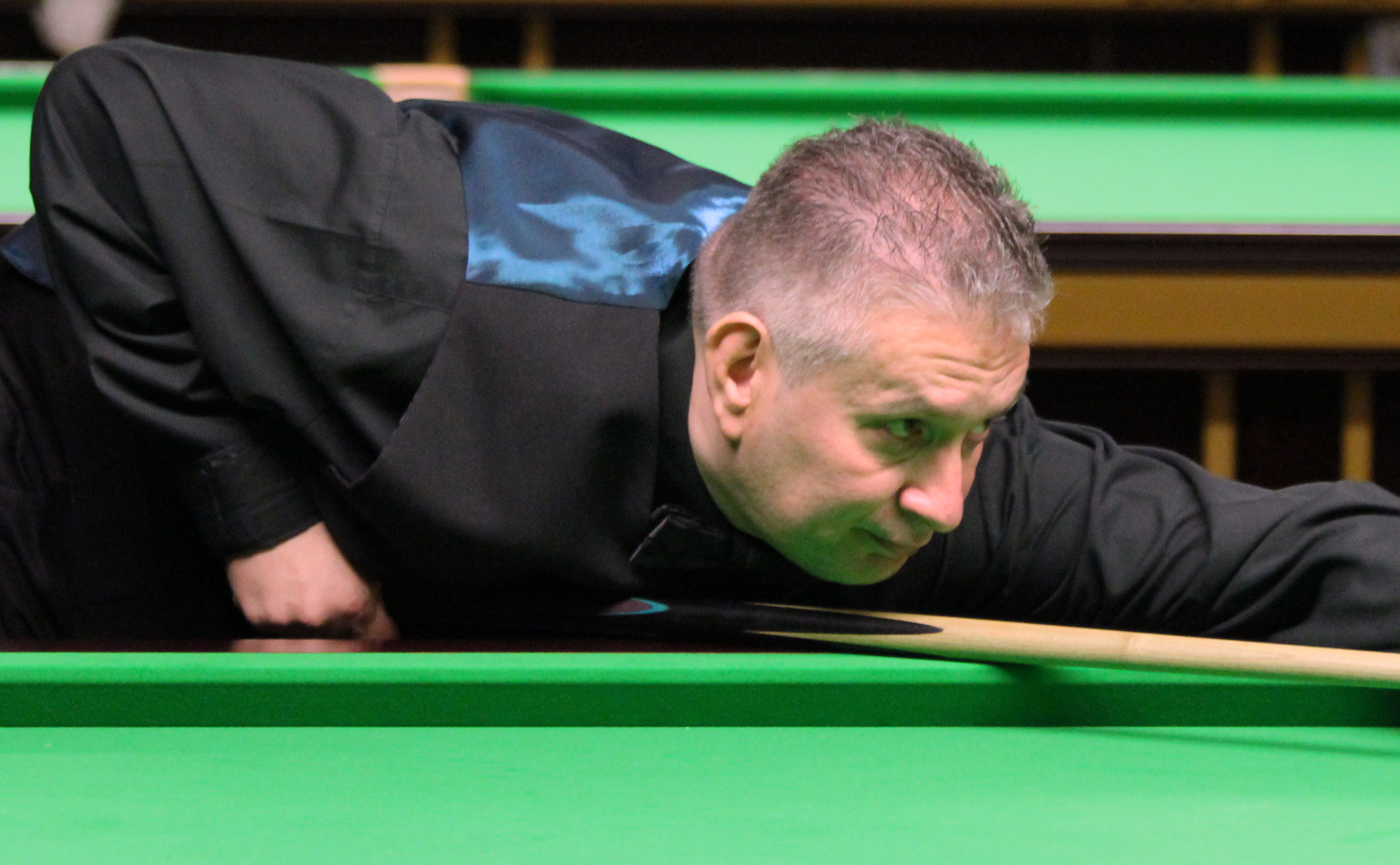
Drago playing at the 2012 Paul Hunter Classic

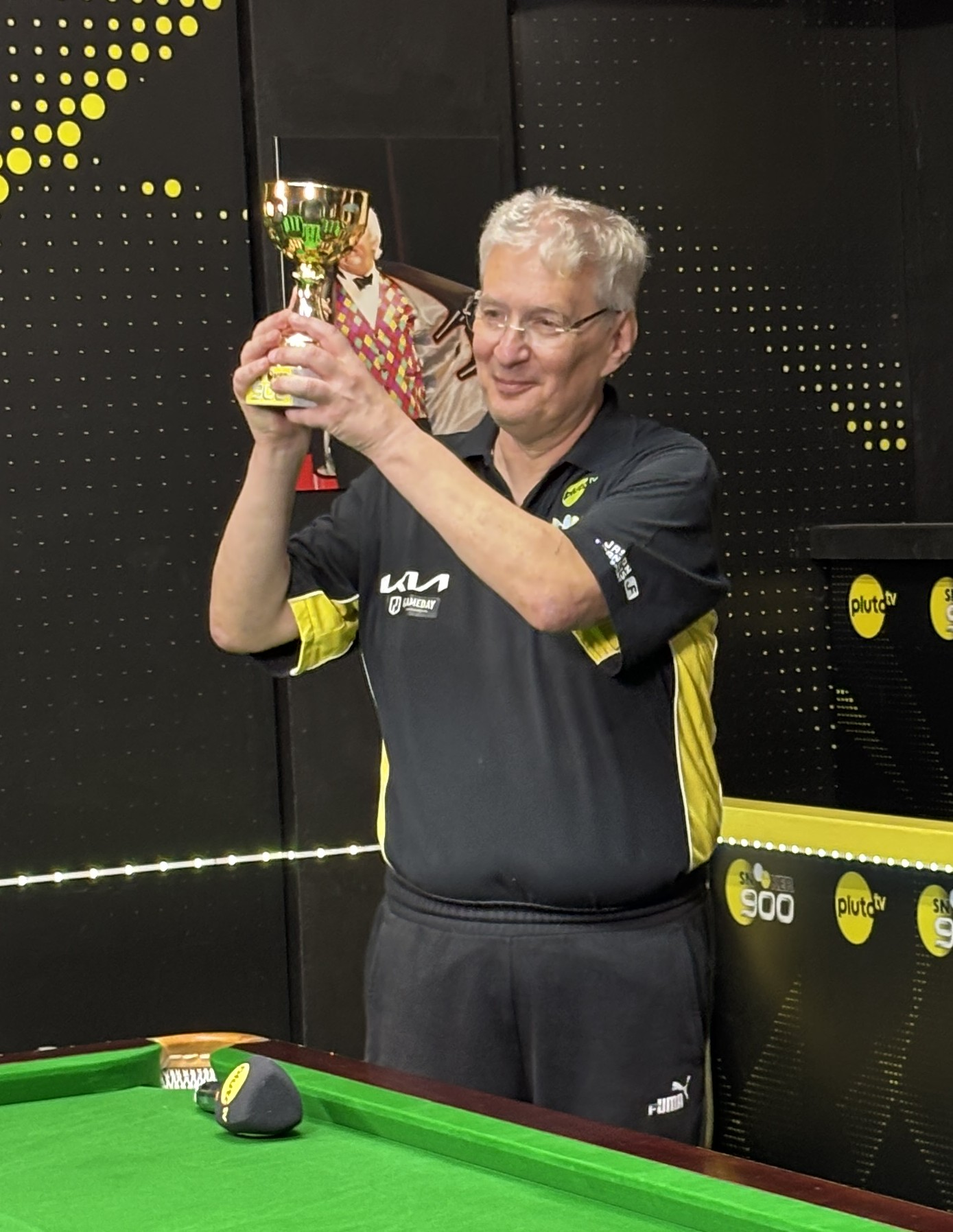
Drago at a Snooker 900 tournament in 2026

2010/2011 was again a good season for Drago, as he climbed eight places to finish 46th in the rankings. However, the 2011/12 season was much worse, with only four qualifying wins to his name. His best results were reaching the last 32 of several PTC events. After losing 7–10 to amateur Justin Astley in the 2012 World Snooker Championship qualifiers, Drago finished the season ranked 65th, not making it into the top 64 guaranteeing their place for the next season; however, he was given a wildcard for the next season as a European nomination, along with young Luca Brecel. Drago could not qualify for any of the ranking events during the 2012–13 season. He made headlines in his qualifying match against Alan McManus for the German Masters, when, upon being told he would be fined £250 for conceding the match early, he slapped himself in the face a number of times. Drago finished the year ranked world number 82.

Drago lost his place on the tour at the end of the 2015/16 season and he failed to qualify for the main tour in that season's Q School.

In 2020, Drago was selected for the Seniors World Championship. However, on the counsel of his personal doctor, he refused the offer due to the COVID-19 pandemic ongoing at the time.

Drago returned to televised snooker in the 2023 World Seniors Championship where he beat both Vito Puopolo and world number 64 Mark Davis to reach the semi-finals where he lost to eventual champion Jimmy White. One year later, he again reached the semi-finals, where he lost to Igor Figueiredo.

== Pool career ==
Drago's first major pool win was the 2003 World Pool Masters, which came just a few weeks after a run to the semi-finals of that year's World Pool Championship.

Drago was member of the winning European team at the 2007 and 2008 Mosconi Cup. In 2007 in Las Vegas, Drago won all of his single matches which earned him the Most Valuable Player Award.

In 2008, Drago won the Predator International 10-ball Championship, beating Francisco Bustamante 13–10.

== Accomplishments ==
Drago is well known for the speed of his play, and holds a number of records resulting from this. In 1993 he recorded the fastest ever best-of-9-frames snooker victory by beating Sean Lanigan in just thirty-four minutes at the 2nd leg of the Strachan Challenge. He also holds the record for the fastest best-of-17 match, beating Joe O'Boye 9–0 in 81 minutes at the 1990 UK Championship. Conversely, he lost 4–13 against Ronnie O'Sullivan in the second round of the 1996 World Championship in just 167 minutes and 33 seconds, an all-time Crucible record and less than 9 minutes per frame. In the 1996 UK Championship he made a century break in just three minutes and thirty-one seconds against John Higgins. In the third round of the 1988 Fidelity Unit Trusts International he won the fifth frame 62–0 in just 3 minutes. In 1995, he made a break of 149 in practice against Nick Manning in a snooker club in West Norwood, London. Drago was left snookered after a foul and potted the brown as a free ball and again as the colour, before potting the fifteen reds with thirteen blacks, a pink and a blue, and all the colours.

== Playing style ==
His style has earned him the nickname "the Tornado".

== Performance and rankings timeline ==
Tournament	1984/ 85	1985/ 86	1986/ 87	1987/ 88	1988/ 89	1989/ 90	1990/ 91	1991/ 92	1992/ 93	1993/ 94	1994/ 95	1995/ 96	1996/ 97	1997/ 98	1998/ 99	1999/ 00	2000/ 01	2001/ 02	2002/ 03	2003/ 04	2004/ 05	2005/ 06	2006/ 07	2007/ 08	2008/ 09	2009/ 10	2010/ 11	2011/ 12	2012/ 13	2013/ 14	2014/ 15	2015/ 16	2016/ 17	2017/ 18	2018/ 19	2022/ 23	2023/ 24
Ranking (Note: From the 2010/2011 season it shows the ranking at the beginning of the season.)	(Note: He was an amateur)	(Note: New players on the Main Tour do not have a ranking)	37	32	20	30	30	22	24	20	16	14	15	11	10	20	26	29	28	24	22	36	51	68			54	46	(Note: Players qualified through European nomination started the season without ranking points.)	81	(Note: Players qualified through European Tour Order of Merit started the season without prize money ranking points.)	81					
Ranking tournaments
Paul Hunter Classic (Note: The event was also called the Grand Prix Fürth (2004/2005) and the Fürth German Open (2005/2006-2006/2007))	Tournament Not Held																				Pro-am Event						Minor-Ranking Event						A	LQ			
World Open (Note: The event was also called the Grand Prix (1984/1985-2000/2001 and 2004/2005-2009/2010) and the LG Cup (2001/2002-2003/2004))	A	3R	2R	3R	2R	1R	2R	1R	1R	1R	2R	2R	QF	3R	1R	3R	2R	1R	2R	1R	2R	1R	LQ	LQ	A	LQ	LQ	LQ	LQ	LQ	Not Held		A	A	A	A	A
European Masters (Note: The event was also called the European Open (1988/1989-1996/1997 and 2001/2002-2003/2004), the Irish Open (1998/1999) and the Malta Cup (2004/2005-2007/2008))	Tournament Not Held				1R	1R	1R	1R	3R	2R	2R	QF	2R	NH	SF	Not Held		LQ	1R	SF	LQ	LQ	LQ	NR	Tournament Not Held								WD	A	A	A	A
International Championship	Tournament Not Held																												LQ	LQ	A	A	A	A	A	A	A
Shanghai Masters	Tournament Not Held																							1R	A	LQ	LQ	LQ	LQ	LQ	LQ	LQ	A	A	A	A	A
UK Championship	A	2R	QF	1R	1R	2R	2R	QF	2R	3R	2R	2R	3R	2R	1R	2R	2R	3R	2R	2R	1R	LQ	LQ	LQ	A	LQ	LQ	LQ	LQ	1R	2R	1R	A	A	A	A	A
Scottish Open (Note: The event was also called the International Open (1984/1985 and 1986/1987-1996/1997), the Matchroom Trophy (1985/1986) and the Players Championship (2003/2004))	A	LQ	2R	1R	2R	2R	Not Held		1R	3R	2R	3R	F	1R	2R	1R	1R	2R	1R	1R	Tournament Not Held								MR	Not Held			A	A	A	A	A
German Masters (Note: The event was also called the German Open (1995/1996-1997/1998))	Tournament Not Held											2R	2R	QF	NR	Tournament Not Held											LQ	LQ	LQ	LQ	LQ	LQ	A	A	A	A	A
Shoot-Out	Tournament Not Held						NR	Tournament Not Held																			Non-Ranking Event						A	A	A	A	A
World Grand Prix	Tournament Not Held																														NR	DNQ	DNQ	DNQ	A	A	A
Welsh Open	Tournament Not Held							1R	3R	2R	2R	2R	3R	1R	1R	2R	LQ	1R	2R	1R	1R	LQ	LQ	LQ	A	LQ	LQ	LQ	LQ	1R	1R	1R	A	A	A	A	A
Players Championship (Note: The event was also called the Players Tour Championship Finals (2010/2011–2015/2016))	Tournament Not Held																										DNQ	DNQ	DNQ	DNQ	DNQ	DNQ	DNQ	DNQ	A	A	A
China Open (Note: The event was also called the China International (1997/1998-1998/1999))	Tournament Not Held													NR	1R	LQ	LQ	1R	Not Held		LQ	LQ	LQ	LQ	A	1R	LQ	LQ	LQ	WD	A	A	A	A	A	A	A
World Championship	A	LQ	LQ	QF	LQ	1R	LQ	1R	1R	LQ	2R	2R	1R	2R	2R	1R	1R	LQ	2R	LQ	1R	LQ	LQ	LQ	A	LQ	LQ	LQ	LQ	LQ	LQ	LQ	A	A	A	A	A
Non-ranking tournaments
The Masters	A	A	A	A	A	A	LQ	LQ	LQ	LQ	WR	1R	WR	1R	QF	LQ	A	LQ	LQ	A	A	LQ	A	A	A	A	A	A	A	A	A	A	A	A			
World Seniors Championship	Tournament Not Held							A	Tournament Not Held																		LQ	1R	1R	1R	LQ	1R	A	A	2R	SF	SF
Former ranking tournaments
Canadian Masters	NH	Non-Ranking Event			LQ	Tournament Not Held																															
Classic	A	LQ	LQ	2R	2R	3R	QF	1R	Tournament Not Held																												
Strachan Open	Tournament Not Held							2R	MR	NR	Tournament Not Held																										
Asian Classic (Note: The event was also called the Dubai Masters (1988/1989), the Dubai Classic (1989/1990-1994/1995) and the Thailand Classic (1995/1996))	Tournament Not Held				NR	3R	2R	1R	1R	LQ	2R	2R	QF	Tournament Not Held																							
Malta Grand Prix	Tournament Not Held										Non-Ranking Event					LQ	NR	Tournament Not Held																			
Thailand Masters (Note: The event was also called the Asian Open (1989/1990-1992/1993) and the Thailand Open (1993/1994-1996/1997))	Non-Ranking Event			Not Held		3R	2R	3R	1R	QF	QF	1R	1R	2R	1R	LQ	LQ	1R	NR	Not Held			NR	Tournament Not Held													
British Open	A	1R	1R	1R	2R	2R	3R	3R	QF	QF	1R	1R	QF	2R	1R	1R	2R	1R	2R	3R	1R	Tournament Not Held															
Irish Masters	Non-Ranking Event																		LQ	1R	1R	NH	NR	Tournament Not Held													
Northern Ireland Trophy	Tournament Not Held																					NR	1R	LQ	A	Tournament Not Held											
Wuxi Classic (Note: The event was also called the Jiangsu Classic (2008/2009–2009/2010))	Tournament Not Held																								Non-Ranking Event				LQ	LQ	1R	Not Held					
Australian Goldfields Open (Note: The event was also called the Australian Open (1994/1995-1995/1996) and the Australian Masters (1995/1996))	Non-Ranking Event				NH	1R	Tournament Not Held				Non-Ranking		Tournament Not Held															LQ	LQ	LQ	A	A	Not Held				
Former non-ranking tournaments
Costa Del Sol Classic	LQ	Tournament Not Held																																			
World Masters	Tournament Not Held						F	Tournament Not Held																													
Nescafe Extra Challenge	Not Held						RR	NH	A	Tournament Not Held																											
London Masters	Tournament Not Held				QF	A	A	Tournament Not Held																													
European Masters League	Tournament Not Held							RR	Tournament Not Held																												
Kent Classic (Note: The event was also called the Kent Cup (1986/1987-1987/1988 and 1989/1990-1990/1991))	Not Held		A	QF	A	A	A	NH	A	Tournament Not Held																											
European Challenge	Tournament Not Held							SF	F	Tournament Not Held																											
Tenball	Tournament Not Held										SF	Tournament Not Held																									
Guangzhou Masters	Tournament Not Held											W	Tournament Not Held																								
Malta Masters	Tournament Not Held											1R	Tournament Not Held																								
German Masters	Tournament Not Held											Ranking Event			SF	Tournament Not Held											Ranking Event										
Pontins Professional	A	A	QF	SF	F	QF	A	A	A	A	A	A	A	A	A	A	Tournament Not Held																				
Malta Grand Prix	Tournament Not Held										F	QF	F	SF	QF	R	RR	Tournament Not Held																			
Champions Cup (Note: The event was also called the Charity Challenge (1994/1995-1998/1999))	Tournament Not Held										1R	1R	A	1R	A	A	A	A	Tournament Not Held																		
Scottish Masters	A	A	A	A	A	A	A	A	A	A	A	A	LQ	LQ	A	A	LQ	LQ	Tournament Not Held																		
Irish Masters	A	A	A	A	A	A	A	A	A	A	A	A	A	1R	A	A	A	A	Ranking Event			A	Tournament Not Held														
Malta Cup	Tournament Not Held				Ranking Event									NH	R	Not Held		Ranking Event						RR	Tournament Not Held								Ranking				
Legends of Snooker	Tournament Not Held																									QF	Tournament Not Held										
Premier League Snooker (Note: The event was also called the Matchroom League (1986/1987-1991/1992), the International League (1989/1990) and the European League (1992/1993-1996/1997))	Not Held		A	A	A	A	A	RR	A	A	A	A	A	A	A	A	A	A	A	A	A	A	A	A	A	A	A	A	A	Tournament Not Held							
Shoot-Out	Tournament Not Held						2R	Tournament Not Held																			2R	2R	A	A	A	A	Ranking				

Performance Table Legend
LQ	lost in the qualifying draw	#R	lost in the early rounds of the tournament (WR=Wildcard round, RR=Round robin)	QF	lost in the quarter-finals
SF	lost in the semi-finals	F	lost in the final	W	won the tournament
DNQ	did not qualify for the tournament	A	did not participate in the tournament	WD	withdrew from the tournament

NH / Not Held	means an event was not held.
NR / Non-Ranking Event	means an event is/was no longer a ranking event.
R / Ranking Event	means an event is/was a ranking event.
MR / Minor-Ranking Event	means an event is/was a minor-ranking event.
PA / Pro-am Event	means an event is/was a pro-am event.

== Career finals ==
=== Ranking finals: 1 ===
Outcome	No.	Year	Championship	Opponent in the final	Score
Runner-up	1.	1997	International Open	(Scotland) Stephen Hendry	1–9

=== Minor-ranking finals: 1 (1 title) ===
Outcome	No.	Year	Championship	Opponent in the final	Score
Winner	1.	1993	Strachan Challenge – Event 3	(Republic of Ireland) Ken Doherty	9–7

=== Non-ranking finals: 7 (1 titles) ===
Outcome	No.	Year	Championship	Opponent in the final	Score	Ref
Runner-up	1.	1989	Pontins Professional	(Wales) Darren Morgan	2–9	
Runner-up	2.	1991	World Masters	(England) Jimmy White	6–10	
Runner-up	3.	1993	European Challenge	(Scotland) Stephen Hendry	3–5	
Runner-up	4.	1994	Malta Grand Prix	(England) John Parrott	6–7	
Runner-up	5.	1995	WPBSA Minor Tour – Event 5	(England) David Roe	3–6	
Winner	1.	1996	Guangzhou Masters	(England) Steve Davis	6–2	
Runner-up	6.	1996	Malta Grand Prix (2)	(England) Nigel Bond	3–7	

=== Team finals: 1 ===
Outcome	No.	Year	Championship	Team/partner	Opponent(s) in the final	Score
Runner-up	1.	1989	World Cup	Rest of the World	England	8–9

=== Pro-am finals: 9 (5 titles) ===
Outcome	No.	Year	Championship	Opponent in the final	Score
Runner-up	1.	1990	Malta Pro-Am	(Malta) Alex Borg	4–8
Winner	1.	1991	Malta Pro-Am	(Malta) Alex Borg	7–6
Winner	2.	1992	Malta Pro-Am (2)	(Northern Ireland) Joe Swail	7–3
Runner-up	2.	2011	3 Kings Open	(Wales) Dominic Dale	1–5
Winner	3.	2012	3 Kings Open	(Belgium) Bjorn Haneveer	5–3
Runner-up	3.	2013	3 Kings Open (2)	(England) Stephen Lee	4–5
Runner-up	4.	2014	3 Kings Open (3)	(Belgium) Luca Brecel	4–5
Winner	4.	2015	3 Kings Open (2)	(Belgium) Luca Brecel	5–4
Winner	5.	2016	3 Kings Open (3)	(Malta) Brian Cini	5–1

=== Amateur finals: 3 (2 titles) ===
Outcome	No.	Year	Championship	Opponent in the final	Score
Winner	1.	1984	Malta Amateur Championship	(Malta) Alf Micallef	7–3
Runner-up	1.	1985	Malta Amateur Championship	(Malta) Paul Mifsud	1–7
Winner	2.	2009	EBSA International Open	(Netherlands) Roy Stolk	5–4

=== Pool tournament wins ===
- 2003 World Pool Masters
- 2007 Mosconi Cup
- 2007 Mosconi Cup (MVP)
- 2008 Euro Tour French Open
- 2008 Mosconi Cup
- 2008 Predator International 10-ball Championship
