= 1996 Scottish Masters =

Scottish Masters
Tournament information
- Dates: 24–29 September 1996
- Venue: Motherwell Civic Centre
- City: Motherwell
- Country: Scotland
- Organisation: WPBSA
- Format: Non-ranking event
- Total prize fund: £175,000
- Winner's share: £60,000
- Highest break: (Scotland) Alan McManus (138)

Final
- Champion: (England) Peter Ebdon
- Runner-up: (Scotland) Alan McManus
- Score: 9–6

The 1996 Regal Scottish Masters was a professional non-ranking snooker tournament that took place between 24 and 29 September 1996 at the Motherwell Civic Centre in Motherwell, Scotland.

Stephen Hendry was the defending champion, but he lost in the quarter-finals to Alan McManus.

Peter Ebdon defeated McManus in the final, to win his first Scottish Masters title.

== Prize Fund ==
The breakdown of prize money for this year is shown below:

- Winner: £60,000
- Runner-up: £28,000
- Semi-final: £14,500
- Quarter-final: £8,500
- Round 1: £4,750
- High break: £5,000
- Total: £175,000

== Main draw ==
Round 1 Best of 9 Frames
(Scotland) Alan McManus | 5
(England) Steve Davis | 2
(Republic of Ireland) Ken Doherty | 5
(England) Jimmy White | 2
(England) Ronnie O'Sullivan | 5
(Wales) Darren Morgan | 3
(Wales) Mark Williams | 5
(England) Nigel Bond | 2

Quarter-finals; Best of 11 Frames
(Scotland) Stephen Hendry | 3
(Scotland) Alan McManus | 6
(England) John Parrott | 6
(Republic of Ireland) Ken Doherty | 3
(England) Peter Ebdon | 6
(England) Ronnie O'Sullivan | 2
(Scotland) John Higgins | 6
(Wales) Mark Williams | 2

Semi-finals; Best of 11 Frames
(Scotland) Alan McManus | 6
(England) John Parrott | 5
(England) Peter Ebdon | 6
(Scotland) John Higgins | 5

Final; Best of 17 Frames
(Scotland) Alan McManus | 6
(England) Peter Ebdon | 9

== Century breaks ==
- 138, 127 – Alan McManus
- 127 – Peter Ebdon
- 122 – Stephen Hendry
- 119 – John Higgins
- 104 – Ronnie O'Sullivan
