= 1997 European League =

Doc Martens European League
Tournament information
- Dates: 28 December 1996 – 18 May 1997
- Venue: Diamond Centre
- City: Irthlingborough
- Country: England
- Organisation: Matchroom Sport
- Format: Non-ranking event
- Winner's share: £60,000

Final
- Champion: (England) Ronnie O'Sullivan
- Runner-up: (Scotland) Stephen Hendry
- Score: 10–8

The 1997 Doc Martens European League was a professional non-ranking snooker tournament that was played from 28 December 1996 to 18 May 1997. All matches including the play-offs were played at the Diamond Centre at Irthlingborough.

Ronnie O'Sullivan won in the final 10–8 against Stephen Hendry.

== League phase ==
Ranking		(England) EBD	(Scotland) HEN	(Republic of Ireland) DOH	(England) OSU	(England) DAV	(Scotland) HIG	(England) PAR	(England) WHI	Frame W-L	Match W-D-L	Pld-Pts
1	Peter Ebdon	x	x	5 + 2	x	4	5	7	5	28–20	4–1–1	6–9
2	Stephen Hendry	x	x	x	6 + 4	7	2	4	7	30–18	3–2–1	6–8
3	Ken Doherty	3 + 6	x	x	x	3	4	7	6	29–19	3–1–2	6–7
4	Ronnie O'Sullivan	x	2 + 4	x	x	7	4	4	7	28–20	2–3–1	6–7
5	Steve Davis	4	1	5	1	x	6 + 4	x	x	21–27	2–2–2	6–6
6	John Higgins	3	6	4	4	2 + 4	x	x	x	23–25	1–3–2	6–5
7	John Parrott	1	4	1	4	x	x	x	7 + 4	21–27	1–3–2	6–5
8	Jimmy White	3	1	2	1	x	x	1 + 4	x	12–36	0–1–5	6–1

Top four qualified for the play-offs. If points were level then most frames won determined their positions. If two players had an identical record then the result in their match determined their positions. If that ended 4–4 then the player who got to four first was higher.

- 28 December Match Day 1
  - Ken Doherty 7–1 John Parrott
  - Ronnie O'Sullivan 7–1 Steve Davis
- 29 December Match Day 2
  - Peter Ebdon 7–1 John Parrott
  - Peter Ebdon 5–3 Ken Doherty
  - Steve Davis 6–2 John Higgins
- 18 January Match Day 3
  - Stephen Hendry 6–2 Ronnie O'Sullivan
  - John Parrott 7–1 Jimmy White
  - John Higgins 6–2 Stephen Hendry
- 19 January Match Day 4
  - Ken Doherty 6–2 Jimmy White
  - Peter Ebdon 5–3 Jimmy White
  - Ronnie O'Sullivan 4–4 John Higgins
  - Stephen Hendry 7–1 Steve Davis
- 12 April Match Day 5
  - John Higgins 4–4 Ken Doherty
  - John Parrott 4–4 Stephen Hendry
  - Steve Davis 4–4 Peter Ebdon
- 13 April Match Day 6
  - Ronnie O'Sullivan 4–4 John Parrott
  - Ken Doherty 6–2 Peter Ebdon
  - Stephen Hendry 7–1 Jimmy White
- 10 May Match Day 7
  - Peter Ebdon 5–3 John Higgins
  - Steve Davis 5–3 Ken Doherty
  - Ronnie O'Sullivan 7–1 Jimmy White
- 11 May Match Day 8
  - Steve Davis 4–4 John Higgins
  - Ronnie O'Sullivan 4–4 Stephen Hendry
  - John Parrott 4–4 Jimmy White

== Play-offs ==
17–18 May (Diamond Centre, Irthlingborough, England)

Semi-finals; Best of 11 frames
1	(England) Peter Ebdon	2
4	(England) Ronnie O'Sullivan	6
2	(Scotland) Stephen Hendry	6
3	(Republic of Ireland) Ken Doherty	3

Final; Best of 19 frames
4	(England) Ronnie O'Sullivan	10
2	(Scotland) Stephen Hendry	8
