= 1997 Thailand Open =

Thailand Open
Tournament information
- Dates: 10–16 March 1997
- Venue: Century Park Hotel
- City: Bangkok
- Country: Thailand
- Organisation: WPBSA
- Format: Ranking event
- Winner's share: £40,000

Final
- Champion: Peter Ebdon (ENG)
- Runner-up: Nigel Bond (ENG)
- Score: 9–7

The 1997 Singha and Eagle Cement Thailand Open was a professional ranking snooker tournament that took place between 10 and 16 March 1997 at the Century Park Hotel in Bangkok, Thailand.

Peter Ebdon won the tournament, defeating Nigel Bond 9–7 in the final. The defending champion, Alan McManus, was eliminated by Anthony Hamilton in the first round.

== Wildcard round ==
Match		Score	
WC1	Robin Hull (FIN)	5–4	Kwok Ming Chan (HKG)
WC2	Bradley Jones (ENG)	5–3	Anan Terananon (THA)
WC3	Quinten Hann (AUS)	5–3	Kwan Poomjang (THA)
WC4	Graham Horne (SCO)	5–4	Anurat Wongjan (THA)

== Main draw ==
Last 32; Best of 9 frames
(England) Anthony Hamilton	5
(Scotland) Alan McManus	3
(England) Stephen Lee	5
(Wales) Darren Morgan	3
(England) Steve Davis	5
(England) Jamie Woodman	4
(England) Ronnie O'Sullivan	5
(Finland) Robin Hull	2
(England) John Parrott	5
(Scotland) Graeme Dott	4
(Canada) Alain Robidoux	5
(England) Jimmy Michie	3
(England) Dave Harold	5
(England) Gary Wilkinson	1
(England) Peter Ebdon	5
(England) Bradley Jones	3
(Australia) Quinten Hann	5
(Scotland) John Higgins	3
(Wales) Mark Williams	5
(England) Paul Hunter	1
(Thailand) James Wattana	5
(Scotland) Graham Horne	2
(England) Nigel Bond	5
(England) Mark King	1
(Republic of Ireland) Ken Doherty	5
(England) Neal Foulds	1
(Republic of Ireland) Fergal O'Brien	5
(Malta) Tony Drago	2
(England) Jimmy White	5
(England) Peter Lines	0
(Scotland) Stephen Hendry	5
(England) Mark Flowerdew	0

Last 16; Best of 9 frames
(England) Anthony Hamilton	1
(England) Stephen Lee	5
(England) Steve Davis	2
(England) Ronnie O'Sullivan	5
(England) John Parrott	5
(Canada) Alain Robidoux	1
(England) Dave Harold	1
(England) Peter Ebdon	5
(Australia) Quinten Hann	5
(Wales) Mark Williams	1
(Thailand) James Wattana	4
(England) Nigel Bond	5
(Republic of Ireland) Ken Doherty	4
(Republic of Ireland) Fergal O'Brien	5
(England) Jimmy White	2
(Scotland) Stephen Hendry	5

Quarter-finals; Best of 9 frames
(England) Stephen Lee	3
(England) Ronnie O'Sullivan	5
(England) John Parrott	0
(England) Peter Ebdon	5
(Australia) Quinten Hann	0
(England) Nigel Bond	5
(Republic of Ireland) Fergal O'Brien	3
(Scotland) Stephen Hendry	5

Semi-finals; Best of 9 frames
(England) Ronnie O'Sullivan	1
(England) Peter Ebdon	5
(England) Nigel Bond	5
(Scotland) Stephen Hendry	4

Final; Best of 17 frames
(England) Peter Ebdon	9
(England) Nigel Bond	7
