= 1997 International Open =

Tournament information
- Dates: 13–22 February 1997
- Venue: AECC
- City: Aberdeen
- Country: Scotland
- Organisation: WPBSA
- Format: Ranking event
- Total prize fund: £330,000
- Winner's share: £60,000
- Highest break: Ronnie O'Sullivan (ENG) (142)

Final
- Champion: Stephen Hendry (SCO)
- Runner-up: Tony Drago (MLT)
- Score: 9–1

The 1997 International Open was a professional ranking snooker tournament that took place between 13 and 22 February 1997 at the AECC in Aberdeen, Scotland.

Stephen Hendry won the title by defeating Tony Drago 9–1 in the final. The defending champion John Higgins was defeated by Drago in the semi-finals.

== Main draw ==
Last 64; Best of 9 frames
(Scotland) John Higgins | 5
(Scotland) Graeme Dott | 4
(Northern Ireland) Dennis Taylor | 5
(Scotland) Paul McPhillips | 4
(England) Bradley Jones | 5
(Canada) Alain Robidoux | 4
(England) Paul Wykes | 5
(England) Rod Lawler | 2
(England) Stuart Parnell | 5
(Wales) Darren Morgan | 2
(England) Adrian Rosa | 5
(England) Jason Ferguson | 3
(Scotland) Alan McManus | 5
(England) Matt Wilson | 3
(England) Stephen Lee | 5
(England) Nick Walker | 2
(Republic of Ireland) Ken Doherty | 5
(England) Mark Rowing | 0
(Northern Ireland) Joe Swail | 5
(Cyprus) Mehmet Husnu | 1
(Malta) Tony Drago | 5
(Northern Ireland) Jason Prince | 1
(Pakistan) Shokat Ali | 5
(England) Willie Thorne | 2
(England) Dave Harold | 5
(England) Brian Morgan | 3
(England) Steve James | 5
(England) Jamie Woodman | 3
(England) John Parrott | 5
(Scotland) Jamie Burnett | 2
(England) Joe Johnson | 5
(England) Martin Clark | 1
(England) Peter Ebdon | 5
(England) Mark Johnston-Allen | 2
(Scotland) David McLellan | 5
(England) Mick Price | 1
(Wales) Mark Williams | 5
(Wales) Tony Chappel | 2
(England) Andy Hicks | 5
(Scotland) Alan Burnett | 2
(Thailand) James Wattana | 5
(Northern Ireland) Terry Murphy | 1
(New Zealand) Dene O'Kane | 5
(England) Jonathan Birch | 0
(England) Ronnie O'Sullivan | 5
(Wales) Mark Fenton | 1
(England) Stuart Pettman | 5
(England) Neal Foulds | 1
(England) Nigel Bond | 5
(England) Wayne Brown | 3
(England) David Roe | 5
(England) Anthony Hamilton | 2
(England) Jimmy White | 5
(Republic of Ireland) Michael Judge | 1
(England) Dave Finbow | 5
(England) Leigh Griffin | 3
(England) Steve Davis | 5
(England) Oliver King | 1
(Scotland) Chris Small | 5
(Scotland) Billy Snaddon | 4
(Scotland) Stephen Hendry | 5
(Scotland) Euan Henderson | 4
(England) Gary Wilkinson | 5
(England) Jason Weston | 1

Last 32; Best of 9 frames
(Scotland) John Higgins | 5
(Northern Ireland) Dennis Taylor | 2
(England) Bradley Jones | 1
(England) Paul Wykes | 5
(England) Stuart Parnell | 5
(England) Adrian Rosa | 1
(Scotland) Alan McManus | 5
(England) Stephen Lee | 4
(Republic of Ireland) Ken Doherty | 3
(Northern Ireland) Joe Swail | 5
(Malta) Tony Drago | 5
(Pakistan) Shokat Ali | 4
(England) Dave Harold | 5
(England) Steve James | 0
(England) John Parrott | 5
(England) Joe Johnson | 2
(England) Peter Ebdon | 5
(Scotland) David McLellan | 0
(Wales) Mark Williams | 5
(England) Andy Hicks | 3
(Thailand) James Wattana | 2
(New Zealand) Dene O'Kane | 5
(England) Ronnie O'Sullivan | 5
(England) Stuart Pettman | 3
(England) Nigel Bond | 5
(England) David Roe | 2
(England) Jimmy White | 5
(England) Dave Finbow | 1
(England) Steve Davis | 3
(Scotland) Chris Small | 5
(Scotland) Stephen Hendry | 5
(England) Gary Wilkinson | 3

Last 16; Best of 9 frames
(Scotland) John Higgins | 5
(England) Paul Wykes | 1
(England) Stuart Parnell | 1
(Scotland) Alan McManus | 5
(Northern Ireland) Joe Swail | 3
(Malta) Tony Drago | 5
(England) Dave Harold | 2
(England) John Parrott | 5
(England) Peter Ebdon | 5
(Wales) Mark Williams | 4
(New Zealand) Dene O'Kane | 2
(England) Ronnie O'Sullivan | 5
(England) Nigel Bond | 3
(England) Jimmy White | 5
(Scotland) Chris Small | 2
(Scotland) Stephen Hendry | 5

Quarter-finals; Best of 9 frames
(Scotland) John Higgins | 5
(Scotland) Alan McManus | 3
(Malta) Tony Drago | 5
(England) John Parrott | 3
(England) Peter Ebdon | 5
(England) Ronnie O'Sullivan | 1
(England) Jimmy White | 2
(Scotland) Stephen Hendry | 5

Semi-finals; Best of 11 frames
(Scotland) John Higgins | 5
(Malta) Tony Drago | 6
(England) Peter Ebdon | 3
(Scotland) Stephen Hendry | 6

Final; Best of 17 frames
(Malta) Tony Drago | 1
(Scotland) Stephen Hendry | 9
