= 1978 World Amateur Snooker Championship =

Tournament information
- Dates: 6–25 November 1978
- City: Rabat
- Country: Malta
- Organisation: International Billiards and Snooker Federation
- Format: Round-robin and knockout
- Winner's share: £1,000
- Highest break: Joe Johnson (ENG) 101

Final
- Champion: Cliff Wilson (WAL)
- Runner-up: Joe Johnson (ENG)
- Score: 11–5

The 1978 World Amateur Snooker Championship was the eighth edition of the world championship for amateurs, the first championship having been held in 1963. The 1978 tournament was played from 6 to 25 November.

Cliff Wilson of Wales defeated Joe Johnson of England 11–5 in the final to win the title. They had finished their first session level at 5–5, then Wilson won six consecutive frames. Johnson made the highest break of the tournament, 101. Wilson received £1,000 prize money as winner.

== Qualifying groups ==
Group A

Position	Player	Won	Lost	Frames	Highest break
1	Kevin Burles (AUS)	6	1	26–10	69
2	Paul Mifsud (MLT)	6	1	26–10	62
3	Joe Johnson (ENG)	5	3	23–9	101
4	Jim Donnelly (SCO)	5	2	20–13	78
5	Donal Mc Veigh (NIR)	2	5	15–20	56
6	Peter Reynolds (IOM)	2	5	10–22	45
7	Vincent Cremona (MLT)	2	5	9–25	
8	Mushu Mohideen (CSK)	0	7	8–28	

Group B

Position	Player	Won	Lost	Frames	Highest break
1	Alwyn Lloyd (WAL)	6	1	26–12	65
2	Kirk Stevens (CAN)	5	2	23–16	94
3	Joe Grech (MLT)	4	4	23–16	63
4	Eugene Hughes (IRE)	4	4	23–21	56
5	Mohammed Lafir (LKA)	3	4	19–20	50
6	Dale Meredith (NZL)	3	4	18–20	81
7	Shyam Shroff (IND)	2	5	14–23	39
8	Liam McCann (NIR)	0	7	8–28	40

Group C

Position	Player	Won	Lost	Frames	Highest break
1	Cliff Wilson (WAL)	8	0	32–10	66
2	Robert Paquette (CAN)	5	3	24–14	81
3	Dale Kwok (NZL)	5	3	23–20	49
4	Arvind Savur (IND)	5	3	26–22	56
5	Ian Williamson (ENG)	3	5	22–24	52
6	Ron Atkins (AUS)	3	5	21–24	49
7	Ronnie Miller (SCO)	3	5	18–24	48
8	Alfred Borg (MLT)	2	7	15–27	44
9	Chris Cooper (IOM)	2	7	13–29	33

== Knockout ==
Elimination match Best of 7 frames
Joe Grech (MLT)	4
Dale Kwok (NZL)	0

Quarter-finals; Best of 9 frames
Kevin Burles (AUS)	5
Robert Paquette (CAN)	4
Joe Johnson (ENG)	5
Alwyn Lloyd (WAL)	0
Kirk Stevens (CAN)	5
Paul Mifsud (MLT)	0
Cliff Wilson (WAL)	5
Joe Grech (MLT)	4

Semi-finals; Best of 15 frames
Kevin Burles (AUS)	4
Joe Johnson (ENG)	8
Kirk Stevens (CAN)	2
Cliff Wilson (WAL)	8

Final; Best of 21 frames
Joe Johnson (ENG)	5
Cliff Wilson (WAL)	11
