= 1996 IBSF World Snooker Championship =

IBSF World Snooker Championship
Tournament information
- Dates: 15–30 November 1996
- City: New Plymouth
- Country: New Zealand
- Organisation: IBSF
- Highest break: (Thailand) Anan Teranannon (147) (Belgium) Steve Lemmens (147)

Final
- Champion: (England) Stuart Bingham
- Runner-up: (Australia) Stan Gorski
- Score: 11–5

The 1996 IBSF World Snooker Championship was an amateur snooker tournament that took place from 15 to 30 November 1996 in New Plymouth, New Zealand It was the 23rd edition of the IBSF World Snooker Championship and also doubled as a qualification event for the World Snooker Tour.

== Summary ==
Englishman Stuart Bingham won the event by defeating Australian Stan Gorski 11–5 in the final. This was Bingham's first major championship and as a result Bingham won a spot on the professional World Snooker Tour. Bingham however struggled to advance his career further and spent many seasons as a journeyman professional before eventually improving his form towards the end of the 2000s to become a top-ranked player and winning his first professional ranking event 16 years later, before finally winning the World Snooker Championship in 2015, becoming only the second player, after Ken Doherty, to win both the world amateur and professional championships.

== Results ==
Last 16; Best of 9 frames
(Belgium) Steve Lemmens	5
(Wales) Elfed Evans	4
(Malta) Paul Mifsud	5
(Iceland) Kristján Helgason	4
(Scotland) Stephen Maguire	0
(Scotland) Chris Shade	5
(England) Stuart Bingham	5
(Republic of Ireland) Joe Canny	3
(Hong Kong) Chan Wai Tat	5
(Pakistan) Mohammed Yousuf	3
(Malaysia) Sam Chong	4
(Australia) Johl Younger	5
(Hong Kong) Chan Kwok Ming	5
(Finland) Kimmo Lang	4
(Thailand) Sakchai Sim Ngam	4
(Australia) Stan Gorski	5

Quarter-finals; Best of 9 frames
(Belgium) Steve Lemmens	5
(Malta) Paul Mifsud	1
(Scotland) Chris Shade	2
(England) Stuart Bingham	5
(Hong Kong) Chan Wai Tat	0
(Australia) Johl Younger	5
(Hong Kong) Chan Kwok Ming	2
(Australia) Stan Gorski	5

Semi-finals; Best of 15 frames
(Belgium) Steve Lemmens	5
(England) Stuart Bingham	8
(Australia) Johl Younger	7
(Australia) Stan Gorski	8

Final; Best of 21 frames
(England) Stuart Bingham	11
(Australia) Stan Gorski	5
