= Joe Grech (snooker player) =

Maltese snooker and billiards player

Personal information
- Born: July 9, 1954 Ħamrun, Malta
- Died: 21 August 2021 (aged 66)

Sport
- Country: Malta
- Sport: Snooker
- Professional: 1988–2000

Tournament wins
- World Championship: 1997 (Amateur)

Joe Grech (Maltese: Ġużi Grech; 9 July 1954 – 21 August 2021) was a Maltese snooker and billiards player. A professional snooker player for various years from 1988 to 2000, he won the IBSF World Billiards Championship in 1997. First competing as an amateur in the 1979s, he competed in amateur and professional snooker and billiards championships in a career spanning nearly 40 years. He won the Maltese English Billiards Championship on 21 occasions including 13 successive titles from 2003 to 2015.

Grech was born in Ħamrun, Malta. As an amateur, he also won the Maltese Snooker Championship six times and the men's EBSA European Team Championship twice. He represented the St. Joseph Band Club in local competitions. The Maltese Olympic Committee inducted Grech in its Hall of Fame in 2017.

== Career ==
Grech competed at the 1978 World Amateur Snooker Championship, which was his first-ever appearance in an international snooker competition, subsequently losing to Cliff Wilson in the quarter-finals. The event was played in Malta, the match being particularly notable for a large crowd of Maltese fans that were in attendance. Trailing 0–4, Wilson won four frames but lost the deciding frame in a match that Wilson said he would "always remember". Grech won his first Maltese Billiards Championship in 1978 by defeating Paul Mifsud in the final by 2307 to 1856, points despite Mifsud having a healthy lead in the first session.

He won his first Malta Snooker Championship in 1980 when he defeated Paul Mifsud in a tight match 7–6. He defended his national title the following year, defeating Albert Mangion 7–1 in the final. However, he lost the next two Malta Snooker Championship finals in 1982 and 1983 to Mifsud. He reached the semi-finals at the World Amateur Snooker Championship in 1982 and 1985. A third national title was won at the 1987 Malta Snooker Championship by defeating Alex Borg in the final. At the World Amateur Snooker Championship in 1987, Grech reached his first final, losing to Darren Morgan. Reaching the final of the World Amateur Billiards Championship in 1987, Grech lost to India's Geet Sethi. Grech registered forty-two century breaks during the course of the tournament.

His first professional tournament was the 1989 World Snooker Championship. He received generous support from the Zmerc Pub and English snooker player Carm Zerafa who financially assisted him to compete in professional tournaments. Grech reached the round of 16 of the 1989 Dubai Classic but was defeated by Alex Higgins. Grech was given a place at the Malta Grand Prix, where he lost to fellow countryman Tony Drago in the quarter-finals of the 1996 event. With the World Snooker Tour allowing only the top 64 players to retain a spot on the professional tour for 1997, Grech lost his place playing in the qualification events and UK Tour.

At the 1997 IBSF World Billiards Championship, Grech defeated India's Ashok Shandilya by 2895 to 2836 to win his only World Championship. In the same year, he reached quarter-finals at the EBSA European Snooker Championship, losing 2-5 to Graham Horne. At the 1997 Malta Grand Prix, he lost to Ken Doherty in the quarter-finals. He teamed up with Alex Borg to win the 1997 European Continental Team Cup, Malta's first victory.

Grech reached the semi-final of the World Amateur Snooker Championship in 1998, losing 7-8 to Ryan Day. He returned to the World Snooker Tour the same year, losing to Stephen Hendry in the quarter-final of the 1998 Malta Grand Prix. He again became national champion for two successive years in 1999 and 2000 at the Malta Snooker Championship. He collaborated with Alex Borg again to win the EBSA European Team Championship in 1999 and 2000. Alongside Alex Borg and Somin Zammitt, Grech won the EBSA European Team Championship for a third time in 2005. Grech also reached quarter-finals at the 2005 World Billiards Championship after defeating his compatriot Paul Mifsud in the last 16. At the 2005 Malta Cup, he lost to Tom Ford in the wildcard round and was eliminated from the competition. He lost to Mark Allen in the wildcard round at the 2006 Malta Cup. He also emerged as the winner of the Snooker Open ranking tournament in 2006 organised by the Malta Billiards and Snooker Association.

After leaving the professional Tour, Grech competed as a senior. He received a wild card entry to participate at the 2007 Malta Cup but was knocked out by David Roe of England. He was a part of the team which won the EBSA European Team Championship seniors tournament in 2011. Grech died on 21 August 2021, aged 66.

== Honours ==
Grech was awarded the Midalja għall-Qadi tar-Repubblika in 1997 after becoming the world champion. He won the Maltese English Billiards Championship on 13 consecutive occasions from 2003 to 2015.

In 2017, Grech was inducted into the Hall of Fame of the Malta Olympic Committee, the second billiards player after Paul Mifsud.
