= Alex Borg (snooker player) =

Maltese professional snooker player

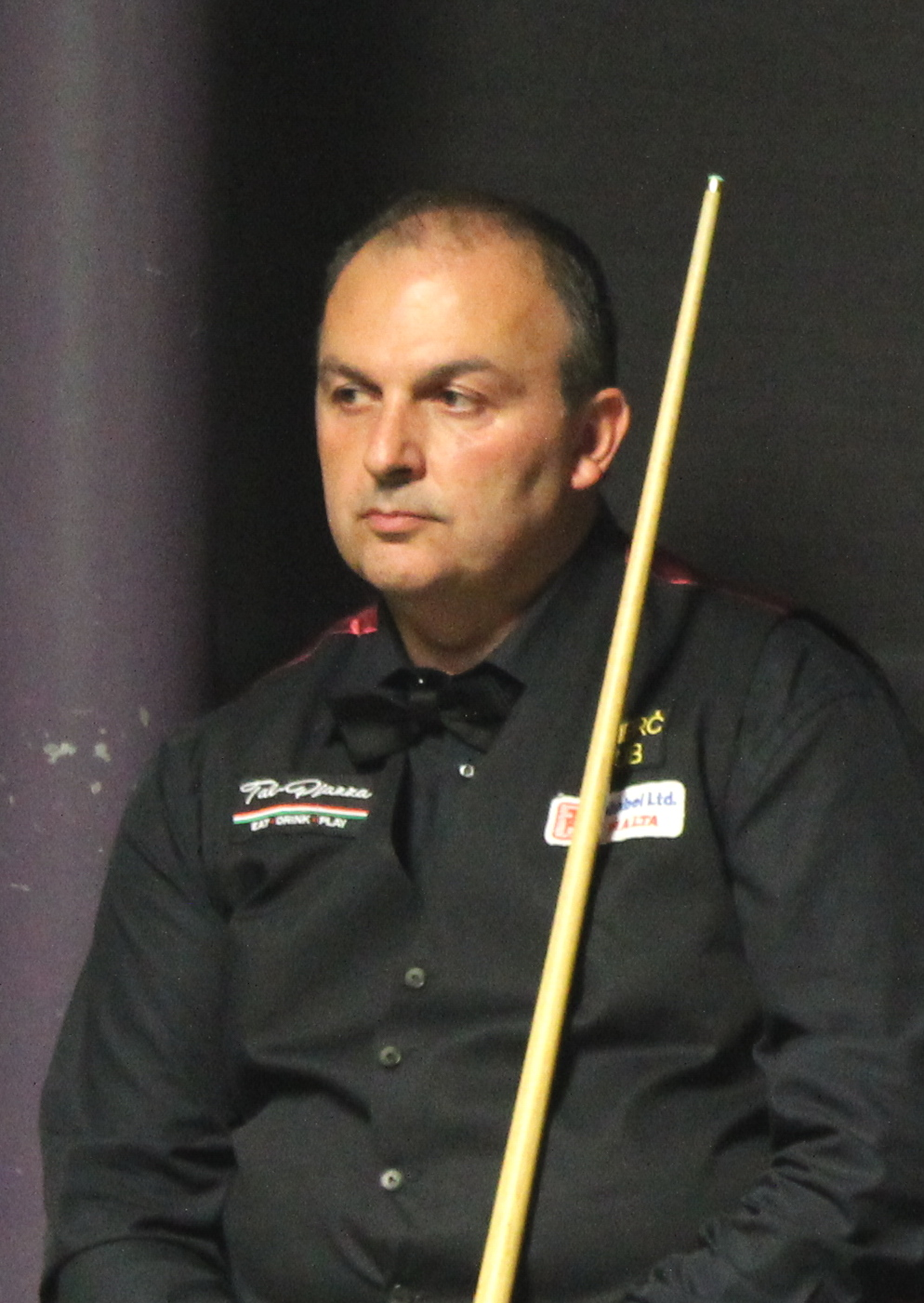
- Paul Hunter Classic 2016

Personal information
- Born: 5 June 1969 (age 57) Mellieha, Malta

Sport
- Country: Malta
- Sport: Snooker
- Professional: 1991–1997, 1998/1999, 2001/2002, 2005–2007, 2013–2015, 2016–2018, 2019–2021
- Highest ranking: 80 (2005/2006)
- Best ranking finish: Last 32 (x1)

Alex Borg (born 5 June 1969) is a Maltese former professional snooker player. Borg currently resides in Mellieħa, Malta.

== Career ==
Borg first turned professional in 1991, and regularly appeared as a wild card in the Malta Grand Prix, where throughout the event's history he defeated players including Nigel Bond and John Higgins. His best performances were reaching the semi-final in 1997 and 1998. He also competed as a wild card in the Malta Cup. However, in ranking events he has not had such success, his best finish being to the last 64, he has achieved this on three occasions, all in the Grand Prix. He has won the EBSA European Snooker Championships twice, the first in 2005 where he beat Kristján Helgason 7–2 in the final, and the following year when he beat Jeff Cundy 7–5.

In the second event of the 2016 Q School, Alex Borg won against Alexander Ursenbacher to gain a two-year tour card. He endured a difficult opening to the 2016/17 season, losing his first eight matches on tour. His best win of the season was a 5–1 victory over Jack Lisowski at the 2017 China Open.

Borg came through the third event of the 2019 Q School by winning six matches to earn a two-year card on the World Snooker Tour for the 2019–20 and 2020–21 seasons. In 2019, the Maltese Billiard and Snooker Association (MBSA) announced that he will be the captain of the Maltese Team during the 2019 World Cup held in China alongside his teammate Brian Cini. He also represented Malta with Tony Drago and Duncan Bezzina during the past years.

In 2021, Alex Borg ended his career as a professional snooker player after being dropped from the tour. Despite this, he still plays snooker in his home country and till date, he is currently recognised as one of the most active players affiliated with the Malta Billiards & Snooker Association.

In 2026, Alex Borg was back in action playing within the World Snooker affiliations, this time in the Q Tour - Event Two in Bulgaria, Sofia, where he lost 4-0 in the first round against Ethan Llewellyn.

== Performance and ranking timeline ==
Tournament	1991/ 92	1992/ 93	1993/ 94	1994/ 95	1995/ 96	1996/ 97	1997/ 98	1998/ 99	1999/ 00	2000/ 01	2001/ 02	2003/ 04	2004/ 05	2005/ 06	2006/ 07	2007/ 08	2013/ 14	2014/ 15	2015/ 16	2016/ 17	2017/ 18	2019/ 20	2020/ 21
Ranking (Note: From the 2010/2011 season it shows the ranking at the beginning of the season.)	(Note: New players on the Main Tour don't have a ranking.)	241	193	180	174	164	(Note: He was not on the Main Tour.)								84			80			83		97
Ranking tournaments
European Masters (Note: The event was called the European Open (1991/1992-1996/1997 & 2001/2002-2003/2004), Irish Open (1998/1999) and the Malta Cup (2004/2005–2007/2008))	LQ	LQ	LQ	LQ	LQ	LQ	NH	LQ	Not Held		LQ	A	WR	LQ	LQ	NR	Not Held			LQ	LQ	LQ	1R
English Open	Tournament Not Held																			1R	1R	1R	1R
Championship League	Tournament Not Held									Non-Ranking Event													RR
Northern Ireland Open	Tournament Not Held																			2R	2R	1R	1R
UK Championship	LQ	LQ	LQ	LQ	LQ	LQ	A	LQ	A	A	LQ	A	A	LQ	LQ	A	1R	1R	A	1R	1R	1R	1R
Scottish Open (Note: The event was called the International Open (1992/1993–1996/1997) and the Players Championship (2003/2004))	NH	LQ	LQ	LQ	LQ	LQ	A	LQ	A	A	LQ	A	Tournament Not Held					Not Held		2R	1R	1R	WD
World Grand Prix	Tournament Not Held																	NR	DNQ	DNQ	DNQ	DNQ	DNQ
German Masters (Note: The event was called the German Open (1995/1996–1997/1998))	Tournament Not Held				LQ	LQ	A	NR	Tournament Not Held								LQ	A	A	LQ	LQ	LQ	LQ
Shoot-Out	Tournament Not Held																Non-Ranking			1R	3R	1R	WD
Welsh Open	LQ	LQ	LQ	LQ	LQ	LQ	A	LQ	A	A	LQ	A	A	LQ	LQ	A	LQ	2R	A	2R	1R	1R	WD
Players Championship (Note: The event was called the Players Tour Championship Grand Finals (2010/2011–2012/2013) and the Players Championship Grand Final (2013/2014–2015/2016))	Tournament Not Held																DNQ	DNQ	DNQ	DNQ	DNQ	DNQ	DNQ
Gibraltar Open	Tournament Not Held																		MR	A	1R	1R	A
WST Pro Series	Tournament Not Held																						WD
Tour Championship	Tournament Not Held																					DNQ	DNQ
World Championship	LQ	LQ	LQ	LQ	LQ	LQ	A	LQ	A	A	LQ	LQ	A	LQ	LQ	A	LQ	LQ	A	LQ	LQ	LQ	LQ
Non-ranking tournaments
World Seniors Championship	A	Tournament Not Held															A	WD	A	A	NH	A	A
The Masters	A	LQ	A	A	A	A	A	A	A	A	A	A	A	A	LQ	A	A	A	A	A	A	A	A
Former ranking tournaments
Classic	LQ	Tournament Not Held																					
Strachan Open (Note: The event was called the Strachan Challenge (1992/1993–1993/1994))	LQ	MR	NR	Tournament Not Held																			
Dubai Classic (Note: The event was called the Thailand Classic (1995/1996) and the Asian Classic (1996/1997))	LQ	LQ	LQ	LQ	LQ	LQ	Tournament Not Held																
Malta Grand Prix	Not Held			Non-Ranking Event					WR	NR	Tournament Not Held												
Thailand Masters (Note: The event was called the Asian Open (1991/1992–1992/1993) and the Thailand Open (1993/1994–1996/1997))	LQ	A	LQ	LQ	LQ	LQ	A	LQ	A	A	LQ	Not Held			NR	Tournament Not Held							
British Open	LQ	LQ	LQ	LQ	LQ	LQ	A	LQ	A	A	LQ	A	A	Tournament Not Held									
Northern Ireland Trophy	Tournament Not Held													NR	LQ	A	Tournament Not Held						
Wuxi Classic (Note: The event was called the Jiangsu Classic (2008/2009–2009/2010))	Tournament Not Held																A	LQ	Not Held				
Australian Goldfields Open (Note: The event was called the Australian Open (1994/1995) and the Australian Masters (1995/1996))	Not Held			NR		Tournament Not Held											A	LQ	A	Not Held			
Shanghai Masters	Tournament Not Held															A	LQ	LQ	A	LQ	LQ	NR	NH
Paul Hunter Classic (Note: The event was called the Grand Prix Fürth (2004/2005) and the Fürth German Open (2005/2006–2006/2007))	Tournament Not Held												Pro-am Event				Minor-Ranking			1R	2R	NR	NH
Indian Open	Tournament Not Held																LQ	A	NH	LQ	LQ	Not Held	
China Open (Note: The event was called the China International (1997/1998–1998/1999))	Tournament Not Held						NR	LQ	A	A	LQ	NH	A	LQ	LQ	A	LQ	A	A	WR	LQ	Not Held	
Riga Masters (Note: The event was called the Riga Open (2014/2015–2015/2016))	Tournament Not Held																	Minor-Rank.		LQ	1R	LQ	NH
International Championship	Tournament Not Held																LQ	LQ	A	LQ	LQ	LQ	NH
China Championship	Tournament Not Held																			NR	LQ	LQ	NH
World Open (Note: The event was called the Grand Prix (1991/1992–2000/2001 and 2004/2005–2009/2010), the LG Cup (2001/2002–2003/2004) and the Haikou World Open (2011/2012–2013/2014))	LQ	LQ	LQ	LQ	1R	LQ	A	1R	A	A	LQ	A	A	LQ	LQ	A	LQ	Not Held		LQ	LQ	LQ	NH
Former non-ranking tournaments
Malta Masters	Tournament Not Held				1R	Tournament Not Held																	
Malta Grand Prix	Not Held			1R	QF	1R	SF	SF	R	RR	Tournament Not Held												
European Masters (Note: The event was called the Malta Cup (2007/2008))	Ranking Event						Tournament Not Held				Ranking Event					RR	Not Held			Ranking Event			
Six-red World Championship (Note: The event was called the Six-red World Grand Prix (2009/2010))	Tournament Not Held																RR	RR	A	A	A	A	NH

Performance Table Legend
LQ	lost in the qualifying draw	#R	lost in the early rounds of the tournament (WR = Wildcard round, RR = Round robin)	QF	lost in the quarter-finals
SF	lost in the semi-finals	F	lost in the final	W	won the tournament
DNQ	did not qualify for the tournament	A	did not participate in the tournament	WD	withdrew from the tournament
DQ	disqualified from the tournament				

NH / Not Held	event was not held.
NR / Non-Ranking Event	event is/was no longer a ranking event.
R / Ranking Event	event is/was a ranking event.
MR / Minor-Ranking Event	means an event is/was a minor-ranking event.
PA / Pro-am Event	means an event is/was a pro-am event.

== Career finals ==
=== Amateur finals: 30 (22 recorded titles) ===
Outcome	No.	Year	Championship	Opponent in the final	Score
Runner-up	1.	1987	Malta Amateur Championship	(Malta) Joe Grech	3–8
Runner-up	2.	1989	Malta Amateur Championship	(Malta) Paul Mifsud	0–8
Runner-up	3.	1990	Malta Amateur Championship	(Malta) Paul Mifsud	2–8
Runner-up	4.	1996	Malta Amateur Championship	(Malta) Paul Mifsud	4–8
Runner-up	5.	1997	Malta Amateur Championship	(Malta) Joe Grech	7–8
Winner	6.	1998	Malta Amateur Championship	(Malta) Joe Grech	8–7
Runner-up	7.	1998	EBSA European Snooker Championships	(Iceland) Kristján Helgason	2–7
Runner-up	8.	1999	Malta Amateur Championship	(Malta) Joe Grech	6–8
Winner	9.	2001	Malta Amateur Championship	(Malta) Simon Zammit	8–5
Runner-up	10.	2002	Malta Amateur Championship	(Malta) Simon Zammit	6–8
Winner	11.	2003	Malta Amateur Championship	(Malta) Duncan Bezzina	8–2
Winner	12.	2004	Malta Amateur Championship	(Malta) Joe Grech	8–4
Runner-up	13.	2004	EBSA European Snooker Championships (2)	(Northern Ireland) Mark Allen	6–7
Winner	14.	2005	Malta Amateur Championship	(Malta) Simon Zammit	7–4
Winner	15.	2005	EBSA European Snooker Championships	(Iceland) Kristján Helgason	7–2
Winner	16.	2006	Malta Amateur Championship	(Malta) Simon Zammit	7–2
Winner	17.	2006	EBSA European Snooker Championships (2)	(England) Jeff Cundy	7–5
Winner	18.	2007	Malta Amateur Championship	(Malta) Simon Zammit	7–4
Winner	19.	2008	Malta Amateur Championship	(Malta) Simon Zammit	7–3
Winner	20.	2009	Malta Amateur Championship	(Malta) Duncan Bezzina	7–2
Runner-up	21.	2010	Malta Amateur Championship	(Malta) Duncan Bezzina	2–7
Runner-up	22.	2010	EBSA International Open	(Norway) Kurt Maflin	2–5
Winner	23.	2011	Malta Amateur Championship	(Malta) Simon Zammit	7–6
Winner	24.	2012	Malta Amateur Championship	(Malta) Duncan Bezzina	7–4
Runner-up	25.	2013	Malta Amateur Championship	(Malta) Duncan Bezzina	1–6
Winner	26.	2014	Malta Amateur Championship	(Malta) Duncan Bezzina	6–4
Winner	27.	2015	Malta Amateur Championship	(Malta) Duncan Bezzina	6–5
Runner-up	28.	2016	Malta Amateur Championship	(Malta) Brian Cini	4–6
Winner	29.	2019	Attrans Malta Snooker Open	(Malta) Duncan Bezzina	6–4
Winner	30.	2019	Second MBSA Amateur Ranking Tournament	(Malta) Duncan Bezzina	5–4
Winner	31.	2021	Maltese Masters Final	(Malta) Pierre Pace	5–1
Winner	32.	2022	Ranking Shootout	(Malta) Manuel Mallia	1–0
Runner-up	33.	2023	Malta Master	(Malta) Duncan Bezzina	1–5
Runner-up	34.	2023	Malta Ranking 4	(Malta) Chris Peplow	1–5
Winner	35.	2023	Ranking Event 1	(Malta) Aaron Busuttil	5–3
Winner	36.	2023	Six Reds Snooker for Parkinson's	(Malta) Manuel Mallia	5–4
Winner	37.	2024	Masters Snooker Champion	(Malta) Philip Ciantar	Undiscovered
Winner	38.	2025	Masters Snooker Champion	(Malta) Mark Saffrett	5–3
Winner	39.	2025	Masters Snooker Tournament 1	(Malta) Mark Saffrett	5–1
Winner	40.	2026	Masters Snooker Tournament 4	(Malta) Philip Ciantar	5–1
