= 1996 Malta Grand Prix =

Malta Grand Prix
Tournament information
- Dates: 8–13 October 1996
- Venue: Jerma Palace Hotel
- City: Marsaskala
- Country: Malta
- Organisation: WPBSA
- Format: Non-ranking event
- Winner's share: £4,000

Final
- Champion: (England) Nigel Bond
- Runner-up: (Malta) Tony Drago
- Score: 7–3

The 1996 Rothmans Malta Grand Prix was the third edition of the professional invitational snooker tournament, which took place from 8 to 13 October 1996. The tournament was played at the Jerma Palace Hotel in Marsaskala, Malta.

Nigel Bond won the title, defeating Tony Drago 7–3 in the final.

== Main draw ==
Round 1 Best of 9 frames
(Northern Ireland) Joe Swail	5
(Malta) Alex Borg	0
(Canada) Alain Robidoux	5
(Malta) Simon Camilleri	3
(Malta) Joe Grech	5
(England) Willie Thorne	3
(Wales) Mark Williams	5
(Malta) Paul Mifsud	3

Quarter-finals; Best of 9 frames
(England) Nigel Bond	5
(Northern Ireland) Joe Swail	2
(Wales) Darren Morgan	3
(Canada) Alain Robidoux	5
(Malta) Tony Drago	5
(Malta) Joe Grech	1
(Republic of Ireland) Ken Doherty	2
(Wales) Mark Williams	5

Semi-finals; Best of 11 frames
(England) Nigel Bond	6
(Canada) Alain Robidoux	0
(Malta) Tony Drago	6
(Wales) Mark Williams	5

Final; Best of 13 frames
(England) Nigel Bond	7
(Malta) Tony Drago	3
