= 2015 World Cup =

2015 World Cup may refer to:

- 2015 Cricket World Cup
- 2014–15 Fencing World Cup
- 2015 FIFA Women's World Cup, in association football
- 2015 FIFA U-20 World Cup, in association football
- 2015 IFAF World Championship, in American football
- 2015 Rugby World Cup (rugby union)
- 2015 FIVB Volleyball Women's World Cup
- 2015 FIVB Volleyball Men's World Cup
- Chess World Cup 2015
- 2015 Netball World Cup
- 2015 World Cup (snooker)

== See also ==
- World Cup
