= 2015 Championship League =

Championship League
Tournament information
- Dates: 5 January – 12 February 2015
- Venue: Crondon Park Golf Club
- City: Stock
- Country: England
- Organisation: Matchroom Sport
- Format: Non-ranking event
- Total prize fund: £180,100
- Winner's share: £10,000 (plus bonuses)
- Highest break: Barry Hawkins (ENG) (147); David Gilbert (ENG) (147)

Final
- Champion: Stuart Bingham (ENG)
- Runner-up: Mark Davis (ENG)
- Score: 3–2

The 2015 Championship League was a professional non-ranking snooker tournament that was played from 5 January to 12 February 2015 at the Crondon Park Golf Club in Stock, England.

Judd Trump was the defending champion, but he was eliminated at the end of group three.

Barry Hawkins made the 111th official maximum break during his league stage match against Stephen Maguire in group one. This was Hawkins second official 147 break and the sixth in the 2014/2015 season. It was also the second maximum break in the history of the tournament. David Gilbert made the 114th maximum break and ninth of the season during group 7.

Stuart Bingham won in the final 3–2 against Mark Davis, and earned a place at the 2015 Champion of Champions.

== Prize fund ==
The breakdown of prize money for this year is shown below:

- Group 1–7
  - Winner: £3,000
  - Runner-up: £2,000
  - Semi-final: £1,000
  - Frame-win (league stage): £100
  - Frame-win (play-offs): £300
  - Highest break: £500
- Winners' group
  - Winner: £10,000
  - Runner-up: £5,000
  - Semi-final: £3,000
  - Frame-win (league stage): £200
  - Frame-win (play-offs): £300
  - Highest break: £1,000
- Tournament total: £180,100

== Group one ==
Group one was played on 5 and 6 January 2015. Shaun Murphy was to take part in this group, but he was replaced by Mark King due to a bacterial chest infection. Barry Hawkins was the first player to qualify for the winners group.

=== Matches ===
- Stuart Bingham 3–1 Marco Fu
- Barry Hawkins 3–2 Neil Robertson
- Stephen Maguire 0–3 Barry Hawkins
- Judd Trump 2–3 Neil Robertson
- Mark King 2–3 Stuart Bingham
- Marco Fu 3–2 Judd Trump
- Neil Robertson 3–1 Stephen Maguire
- Barry Hawkins 2–3 Stuart Bingham
- Mark King 3–1 Marco Fu
- Judd Trump 1–3 Stephen Maguire
- Stuart Bingham 3–0 Stephen Maguire
- Neil Robertson 3–1 Marco Fu
- Stuart Bingham 3–1 Neil Robertson
- Barry Hawkins 1–3 Mark King
- Marco Fu 3–1 Stephen Maguire
- Mark King 1–3 Judd Trump
- Mark King 0–3 Stephen Maguire
- Barry Hawkins 3–2 Marco Fu
- Stuart Bingham 0–3 Judd Trump
- Mark King 1–3 Neil Robertson
- Barry Hawkins 3–2 Judd Trump

=== Table ===
Pos	Player	Pld	W	L	FF	FA	FD	
1	Stuart Bingham (ENG)	6	5	1	15	9	+6	Qualification to Group 1 play-off
2	Neil Robertson (AUS)	6	4	2	15	11	+4	Qualification to Group 1 play-off
3	Barry Hawkins (ENG)	6	4	2	15	12	+3	Qualification to Group 1 play-off
4	Judd Trump (ENG)	6	2	4	13	13	0	Qualification to Group 1 play-off
5	Marco Fu (HKG) (Note: Fu finishes ahead of King due to winning more frames)	6	2	4	11	15	−4	Advances into Group 2
6	Mark King (ENG)	6	2	4	10	14	−4	Eliminated from the competition
7	Stephen Maguire (SCO)	6	2	4	8	13	−5	Eliminated from the competition

=== Play-offs ===
Semi-finals; Best of 5 frames
Stuart Bingham (ENG)	3
Judd Trump (ENG)	2
Neil Robertson (AUS)	1
Barry Hawkins (ENG)	3

Final; Best of 5 frames
Stuart Bingham (ENG)	1
Barry Hawkins (ENG)	3

== Group two ==
Group two was played on 7 and 8 January 2015. The group was won by Matthew Selt, who was a late replacement for Neil Robertson.

=== Matches ===
- Judd Trump 3–0 Marco Fu
- Stuart Bingham 3–2 Matthew Selt
- Ali Carter 3–1 Robert Milkins
- Michael Holt 3–2 Stuart Bingham
- Marco Fu 3–2 Ali Carter
- Robert Milkins 3–2 Michael Holt
- Matthew Selt 3–2 Judd Trump
- Stuart Bingham 1–3 Judd Trump
- Ali Carter 3–1 Michael Holt
- Matthew Selt 2–3 Marco Fu
- Judd Trump 3–0 Michael Holt
- Robert Milkins 0–3 Marco Fu
- Stuart Bingham 2–3 Robert Milkins
- Matthew Selt 3–2 Ali Carter
- Marco Fu 3–0 Michael Holt
- Judd Trump 3–1 Robert Milkins
- Stuart Bingham 1–3 Ali Carter
- Matthew Selt 1–3 Michael Holt
- Judd Trump 1–3 Ali Carter
- Matthew Selt 3–2 Robert Milkins
- Stuart Bingham 3–2 Marco Fu

=== Table ===
Pos	Player	Pld	W	L	FF	FA	FD	
1	Ali Carter (ENG)	6	4	2	16	10	+6	Qualification to Group 2 play-off
2	Judd Trump (ENG)	6	4	2	15	8	+7	Qualification to Group 2 play-off
3	Marco Fu (HKG)	6	4	2	14	10	+4	Qualification to Group 2 play-off
4	Matthew Selt (ENG)	6	3	3	14	15	−1	Qualification to Group 2 play-off
5	Stuart Bingham (ENG)	6	2	4	12	16	−4	Advances into Group 3
6	Robert Milkins (ENG) (Note: Milkins finishes ahead of Holt due to defeating him 3–2)	6	2	4	10	16	−6	Eliminated from the competition
7	Michael Holt (ENG)	6	2	4	9	15	−6	Eliminated from the competition

=== Play-offs ===
Semi-finals; Best of 5 frames
Ali Carter (ENG)	2
Matthew Selt (ENG)	3
Judd Trump (ENG)	3
Marco Fu (HKG)	0

Final; Best of 5 frames
Matthew Selt (ENG)	3
Judd Trump (ENG)	2

== Group three ==
Group three was played on 19 and 20 January 2015. Ricky Walden was to take part this group, but he withdrew and was replaced by Peter Ebdon, who scheduled to play in group six before. Ali Carter won the group.

=== Matches ===
- Marco Fu 3–1 Stuart Bingham
- Judd Trump 3–2 Ali Carter
- Ryan Day 3–1 Peter Ebdon
- Mark Davis 1–3 Judd Trump
- Stuart Bingham 3–2 Ryan Day
- Ali Carter 3–2 Marco Fu
- Judd Trump 2–3 Marco Fu
- Peter Ebdon 1–3 Mark Davis
- Ryan Day 3–1 Mark Davis
- Ali Carter 1–3 Stuart Bingham
- Marco Fu 0–3 Mark Davis
- Peter Ebdon 1–3 Stuart Bingham
- Ali Carter 3–1 Ryan Day
- Judd Trump 1–3 Peter Ebdon
- Stuart Bingham 1–3 Mark Davis
- Judd Trump 2–3 Ryan Day
- Marco Fu 0–3 Peter Ebdon
- Ali Carter 3–1 Mark Davis
- Marco Fu 1–3 Ryan Day
- Ali Carter 1–3 Peter Ebdon
- Judd Trump 2–3 Stuart Bingham

=== Table ===
Pos	Player	Pld	W	L	FF	FA	FD	
1	Ryan Day (WAL)	6	4	2	15	11	+4	Qualification to Group 3 play-off
2	Stuart Bingham (ENG)	6	4	2	14	12	+2	Qualification to Group 3 play-off
3	Ali Carter (ENG)	6	3	3	13	13	0	Qualification to Group 3 play-off
4	Mark Davis (ENG) (Note: Davis finishes ahead of Ebdon due to defeating him 3–1)	6	3	3	12	11	+1	Qualification to Group 3 play-off
5	Peter Ebdon (ENG)	6	3	3	12	11	+1	Advances into Group 4
6	Judd Trump (ENG)	6	2	4	13	15	−2	Eliminated from the competition
7	Marco Fu (HKG)	6	2	4	9	15	−6	Eliminated from the competition

=== Play-offs ===
Semi-finals; Best of 5 frames
Ryan Day (WAL)	1
Mark Davis (ENG)	3
Stuart Bingham (ENG)	0
Ali Carter (ENG)	3

Final; Best of 5 frames
Mark Davis (ENG)	1
Ali Carter (ENG)	3

== Group four ==
Group four was played on 21 and 22 January 2015. Martin Gould was to play in this group, but he moved to group six and was replaced by David Gilbert. Stuart Bingham was the fourth player to qualify for the winners group.

=== Matches ===
- Mark Davis 1–3 Ryan Day
- Stuart Bingham 0–3 Peter Ebdon
- David Gilbert 3–2 Matthew Stevens
- Michael White 0–3 Mark Davis
- Ryan Day 2–3 Stuart Bingham
- Peter Ebdon 3–0 David Gilbert
- Matthew Stevens 2–3 Michael White
- Mark Davis 2–3 Stuart Bingham
- Ryan Day 0–3 Peter Ebdon
- David Gilbert 1–3 Michael White
- Stuart Bingham 2–3 Michael White
- Matthew Stevens 3–1 Peter Ebdon
- Ryan Day 0–3 David Gilbert
- Mark Davis 3–2 Matthew Stevens
- Peter Ebdon 3–1 Michael White
- Stuart Bingham 3–1 Matthew Stevens
- Ryan Day 2–3 Michael White
- Mark Davis 1–3 David Gilbert
- Stuart Bingham 3–1 David Gilbert
- Ryan Day 3–1 Matthew Stevens
- Mark Davis 3–2 Peter Ebdon

=== Table ===
Pos	Player	Pld	W	L	FF	FA	FD	
1	Peter Ebdon (ENG)	6	4	2	15	7	+8	Qualification to Group 4 play-off
2	Stuart Bingham (ENG)	6	4	2	14	12	+2	Qualification to Group 4 play-off
3	Michael White (WAL)	6	4	2	13	13	0	Qualification to Group 4 play-off
4	Mark Davis (ENG)	6	3	3	13	13	0	Qualification to Group 4 play-off
5	David Gilbert (ENG)	6	3	3	11	12	−1	Advances into Group 5
6	Ryan Day (WAL)	6	2	4	10	14	−4	Eliminated from the competition
7	Matthew Stevens (WAL)	6	1	5	11	16	−5	Eliminated from the competition

=== Play-offs ===
Semi-finals; Best of 5 frames
Peter Ebdon (ENG)	1
Mark Davis (ENG)	3
Stuart Bingham (ENG)	3
Michael White (WAL)	0

Final; Best of 5 frames
Mark Davis (ENG)	1
Stuart Bingham (ENG)	3

== Group five ==
Group five was played on 26 and 27 January 2015. This round of group play was won by Mark Davis.

- Michael White 2–3 David Gilbert
- Mark Davis 3–1 Peter Ebdon
- Ronnie O'Sullivan 3–2 Liang Wenbo
- Fergal O'Brien 1–3 Mark Davis
- Peter Ebdon 0–3 Michael White
- David Gilbert 0–3 Ronnie O'Sullivan
- Mark Davis 3–1 Michael White
- Liang Wenbo 1–3 Fergal O'Brien
- Ronnie O'Sullivan 3–0 Fergal O'Brien
- Michael White 0–3 Fergal O'Brien
- Peter Ebdon 2–3 David Gilbert
- Liang Wenbo 0–3 David Gilbert
- Mark Davis 3–0 Liang Wenbo
- Peter Ebdon 3–2 Ronnie O'Sullivan
- Michael White 3–2 Liang Wenbo
- David Gilbert 2–3 Fergal O'Brien
- Mark Davis 1–3 Ronnie O'Sullivan
- Michael White 0–3 Ronnie O'Sullivan
- Peter Ebdon 3–1 Fergal O'Brien
- Peter Ebdon 2–3 Liang Wenbo
- Mark Davis 3-2 David Gilbert

=== Table ===
Pos	Player	Pld	W	L	FF	FA	FD	
1	Ronnie O'Sullivan (ENG)	6	5	1	17	6	+11	Qualification to Group 5 play-off
2	Mark Davis (ENG)	6	5	1	16	8	+8	Qualification to Group 5 play-off
3	David Gilbert (ENG)	6	3	3	13	13	0	Qualification to Group 5 play-off
4	Fergal O'Brien (IRL)	6	3	3	11	12	−1	Qualification to Group 5 play-off
5	Peter Ebdon (ENG)	6	2	4	11	15	−4	Advances into Group 6
6	Michael White (WAL)	6	2	4	9	14	−5	Eliminated from the competition
7	Liang Wenbo (CHN)	6	1	5	8	17	−9	Eliminated from the competition

=== Play-offs ===
Semi-finals; Best of 5 frames
Ronnie O'Sullivan (ENG)	3
Fergal O'Brien (IRL)	2
Mark Davis (ENG)	3
David Gilbert (ENG)	1

Final; Best of 5 frames
Ronnie O'Sullivan (ENG)	2
Mark Davis (ENG)	3

== Group six ==
Group six was played on 28 and 29 January 2015. Martin Gould was to take part this group, but he withdrew and was replaced by Rod Lawler. Ronnie O'Sullivan withdrew from the tournament ahead of this group and was replaced by Ben Woollaston, who went on to win the group.

=== Matches ===
- Ben Woollaston 0–3 David Gilbert
- Fergal O'Brien 3–1 Peter Ebdon
- Kurt Maflin 0–3 Ben Woollaston
- Dominic Dale 3–0 Rod Lawler
- David Gilbert 3–0 Fergal O'Brien
- Peter Ebdon 3–0 Dominic Dale
- Ben Woollaston 0–3 Fergal O'Brien
- Rod Lawler 0–3 Kurt Maflin
- David Gilbert 1–3 Peter Ebdon
- Dominic Dale 3–1 Kurt Maflin
- Rod Lawler 2–3 Peter Ebdon
- Fergal O'Brien 3–0 Kurt Maflin
- Ben Woollaston 3–0 Rod Lawler
- David Gilbert 3–1 Dominic Dale
- Peter Ebdon 3–1 Kurt Maflin
- Fergal O'Brien 2–3 Rod Lawler
- Ben Woollaston 2–3 Dominic Dale
- Fergal O'Brien 0–3 Dominic Dale
- David Gilbert 3–2 Kurt Maflin
- David Gilbert 1–3 Rod Lawler
- Ben Woollaston 3–0 Peter Ebdon

=== Table ===
Pos	Player	Pld	W	L	FF	FA	FD	
1	David Gilbert (ENG)	6	4	2	14	9	+5	Qualification to Group 6 play-off
2	Dominic Dale (WAL)	6	4	2	13	9	+4	Qualification to Group 6 play-off
3	Peter Ebdon (ENG)	6	4	2	13	10	+3	Qualification to Group 6 play-off
4	Ben Woollaston (ENG)	6	3	3	11	9	+2	Qualification to Group 6 play-off
5	Fergal O'Brien (IRL)	6	3	3	11	10	+1	Advances into Group 7
6	Rod Lawler (ENG)	6	2	4	8	15	−7	Eliminated from the competition
7	Kurt Maflin (NOR)	6	1	5	7	15	−8	Eliminated from the competition

=== Play-offs ===
Semi-finals; Best of 5 frames
David Gilbert (ENG)	1
Ben Woollaston (ENG)	3
Dominic Dale (WAL)	1
Peter Ebdon (ENG)	3

Final; Best of 5 frames
Ben Woollaston (ENG)	3
Peter Ebdon (ENG)	0

== Group seven ==
Group seven was played on 9 and 10 February 2015. Xiao Guodong was the last player to qualify for the winners group.

=== Matches ===
- Peter Ebdon 1–3 David Gilbert
- Dominic Dale 1–3 Fergal O'Brien
- Mark Williams 3–0 Peter Ebdon
- John Higgins 2–3 Xiao Guodong
- David Gilbert 3–2 Dominic Dale
- Fergal O'Brien 3–2 John Higgins
- Peter Ebdon 3–1 Dominic Dale
- Xiao Guodong 3–1 Mark Williams
- David Gilbert 3–2 Fergal O'Brien
- John Higgins 3–1 Mark Williams
- Xiao Guodong 2–3 Fergal O'Brien
- Dominic Dale 0–3 Mark Williams
- David Gilbert 3–0 John Higgins
- Peter Ebdon 3–1 Xiao Guodong
- Dominic Dale 0–3 Xiao Guodong
- Fergal O'Brien 2–3 Mark Williams
- Peter Ebdon 3–0 John Higgins
- David Gilbert 3–2 Mark Williams
- Dominic Dale 0–3 John Higgins
- David Gilbert 2–3 Xiao Guodong
- Peter Ebdon 2–3 Fergal O'Brien

=== Table ===
Pos	Player	Pld	W	L	FF	FA	FD	
1	David Gilbert (ENG)	6	5	1	17	10	+7	Qualification to Group 7 play-off
2	Fergal O'Brien (IRL)	6	4	2	16	13	+3	Qualification to Group 7 play-off
3	Xiao Guodong (CHN)	6	4	2	15	11	+4	Qualification to Group 7 play-off
4	Mark Williams (WAL)	6	3	3	13	11	+2	Qualification to Group 7 play-off
5	Peter Ebdon (ENG)	6	3	3	12	11	+1	Eliminated from the competition
6	John Higgins (SCO)	6	2	4	10	13	−3	Eliminated from the competition
7	Dominic Dale (WAL)	6	0	6	4	18	−14	Eliminated from the competition

=== Play-offs ===
Semi-finals; Best of 5 frames
David Gilbert (ENG)	3
Mark Williams (WAL)	1
Fergal O'Brien (IRL)	0
Xiao Guodong (CHN)	3

Final; Best of 5 frames
David Gilbert (ENG)	0
Xiao Guodong (CHN)	3

== Winners' group ==
The winners' group was played on 11 and 12 February 2015. Stuart Bingham won his first Championship League title.

=== Matches ===
- Barry Hawkins 0–3 Matthew Selt
- Ali Carter 3–1 Stuart Bingham
- Xiao Guodong 3–1 Barry Hawkins
- Mark Davis 1–3 Ben Woollaston
- Matthew Selt 3–2 Ali Carter
- Stuart Bingham 1–3 Mark Davis
- Barry Hawkins 3–0 Ali Carter
- Ben Woollaston 3–2 Xiao Guodong
- Matthew Selt 1–3 Stuart Bingham
- Mark Davis 3–0 Xiao Guodong
- Ben Woollaston 1–3 Stuart Bingham
- Ali Carter 3–1 Xiao Guodong
- Barry Hawkins 3–2 Ben Woollaston
- Matthew Selt 1–3 Mark Davis
- Ali Carter 1–3 Ben Woollaston
- Stuart Bingham 0–3 Xiao Guodong
- Matthew Selt 3–0 Xiao Guodong
- Barry Hawkins 3–0 Mark Davis
- Matthew Selt 3–2 Ben Woollaston
- Ali Carter 2–3 Mark Davis
- Barry Hawkins 0–3 Stuart Bingham

=== Table ===
Pos	Player	Pld	W	L	FF	FA	FD	
1	Matthew Selt (ENG)	6	4	2	14	10	+4	Qualification to the Winners' group play-off
2	Mark Davis (ENG)	6	4	2	13	10	+3	Qualification to the Winners' group play-off
3	Ben Woollaston (ENG)	6	3	3	14	13	+1	Qualification to the Winners' group play-off
4	Stuart Bingham (ENG)	6	3	3	11	11	0	Qualification to the Winners' group play-off
5	Barry Hawkins (ENG)	6	3	3	10	11	−1	Eliminated from the competition
6	Ali Carter (ENG)	6	2	4	11	14	−3	Eliminated from the competition
7	Xiao Guodong (CHN)	6	2	4	9	13	−4	Eliminated from the competition

=== Play-offs ===
Semi-finals; Best of 5 frames
Matthew Selt (ENG)	1
Stuart Bingham (ENG)	3
Mark Davis (ENG)	3
Ben Woollaston (ENG)	2

Final; Best of 5 frames
Stuart Bingham (ENG)	3
Mark Davis (ENG)	2

== Century breaks ==
Total: 79

- **147** (1), 118, 110, 109, 105 – Barry Hawkins
- **147** (7), 113, 107, 103, 100, 100 – David Gilbert
- **139** (W), 124, 116, 108, 105 – Matthew Selt
- **139** (5), 101 – Michael White
- **138** (2), 129, 110, 103, 102 – Ali Carter
- **137** (3), 136, 125, 105, 104, 103, 100, 100 – Judd Trump
- **137** (3), 127, 123, 120, 108, 105, 103, 101 – Peter Ebdon
- 136, 121 – John Higgins
- 134, 134, 130, 108, 101 – Marco Fu
- 134, 134, 126, 120, 118, 115, 110, 108, 103, 101 – Stuart Bingham
- **132** (6), 125, 103 – Dominic Dale
- **131** (4), 128, 118, 117, 103 – Mark Davis
- **131** (4), 105 – Matthew Stevens
- 128, 126, 101, 100 – Ronnie O'Sullivan
- 127, 123, 111, 105 – Fergal O'Brien
- 123, 100 – Neil Robertson
- 112 – Liang Wenbo
- 101 – Ben Woollaston
- 100 – Ryan Day

Bold: highest break in the indicated group.

== Winnings ==
No.	Player	1	2	3	4	5	6	7	W	TOTAL
1	Stuart Bingham (ENG)	4,700	1,200	2,400	6,200				14,000	28,500
2	Mark Davis (ENG)			4,400	**4,750**	6,400			9,100	24,650
3	Matthew Selt (ENG)		6,200						**7,100**	13,300
4	Ben Woollaston (ENG)						5,900		6,400	12,300
5	Ali Carter (ENG)		**3,700**	6,100					2,200	12,000
6	David Gilbert (ENG)				1,100	2,600	2,700	**5,100**		11,500
7	Peter Ebdon (ENG)			**1,450**	2,800	1,100	4,200	1,200		10,750
8	Judd Trump (ENG)	2,900	5,000	**1,550**						9,450
9	Barry Hawkins (ENG)	**6,800**							2,000	8,800
10	Xiao Guodong (CHN)							6,300	1,800	8,100
11	Fergal O'Brien (IRL)					2,700	1,100	2,600		6,400
12	Ronnie O'Sullivan (ENG)					5,200				5,200
13	Marco Fu (HKG)	1,100	2,400	900						4,400
14	Ryan Day (WAL)			2,800	1,000					3,800
15	Michael White (WAL)				2,300	**1,400**				3,700
16	Dominic Dale (WAL)						**3,100**	400		3,500
17	Neil Robertson (AUS)	2,800								2,800
18	Mark Williams (WAL)							2,600		2,600
19	Matthew Stevens (WAL)				**1,350**					1,350
20	Mark King (ENG)	1,000								1,000
=	Robert Milkins (ENG)		1,000							1,000
=	John Higgins (SCO)							1,000		1,000
23	Michael Holt (ENG)		900							900
24	Stephen Maguire (SCO)	800								800
=	Liang Wenbo (CHN)					800				800
=	Rod Lawler (ENG)						800			800
27	Kurt Maflin (NOR)						700			700
	Total prize money	20,100	20,400	19,600	19,500	20,200	18,500	19,200	42,600	180,100

Green: Won the group. Bold: Highest break in the group. All prize money in GBP.
