= Stuart Bingham =

English snooker player (born 1976)

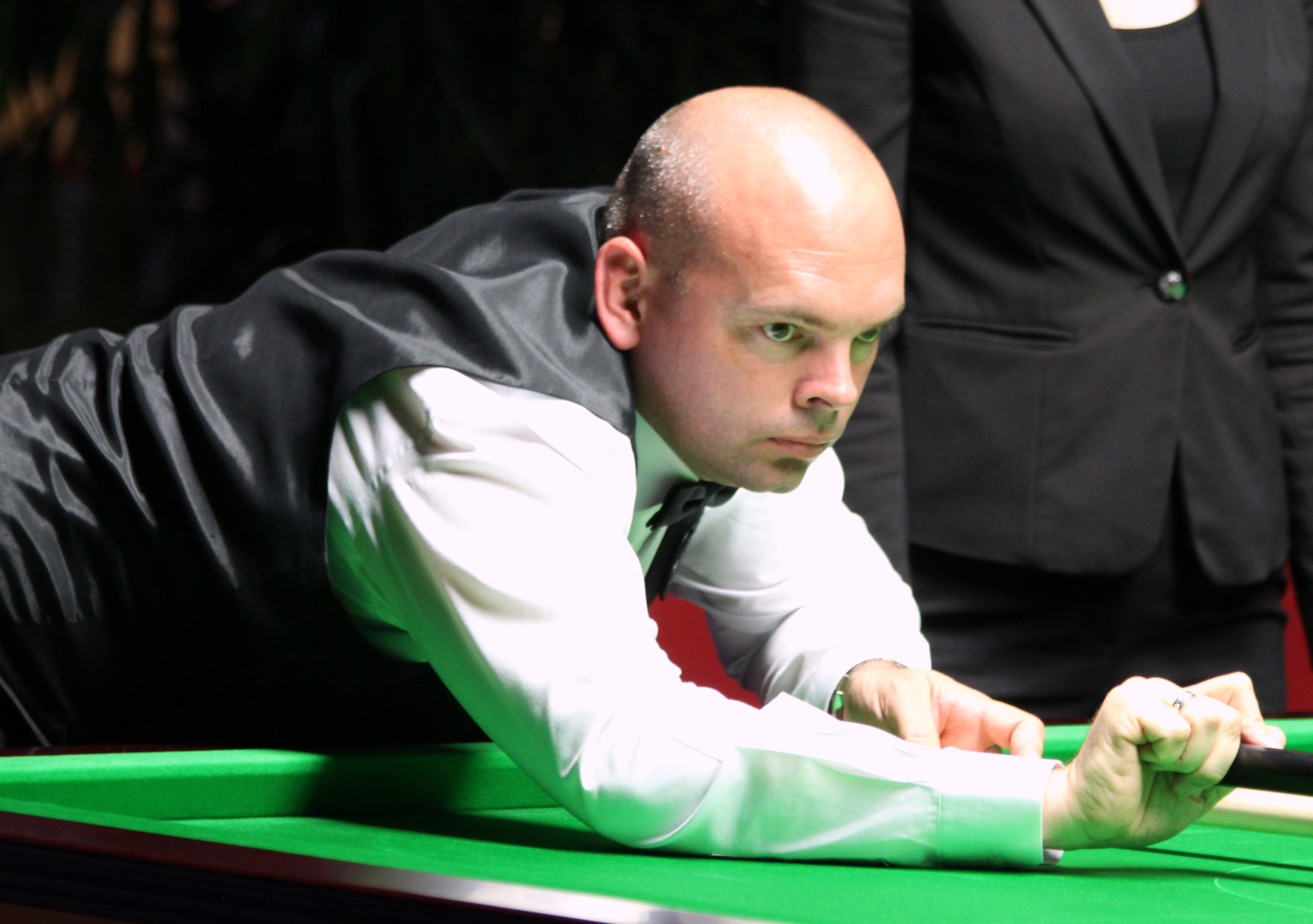
- Bingham at the 2016 Paul Hunter Classic

Personal information
- Nickname: Ball-run
- Born: 21 May 1976 (age 50) Basildon, Essex, England

Sport
- Country: England
- Sport: Snooker
- Professional: 1995–present
- Highest ranking: 2 (May 2015 – March 2017)
- Current ranking: 20 (as of 7 November 2026)
- Maximum breaks: 9
- Century breaks: 631 (as of 19 November 2026)

Tournament wins
- Ranking: 6
- Minor-ranking: 4
- World Championship: 2015

Stuart Bingham (born 21 May 1976) is an English professional snooker player who is a former World Champion and Masters winner. He won the 1996 World Amateur Championship but enjoyed little sustained success in the early part of his professional career. His form improved in his mid-thirties: at age 35, he won his first ranking title at the 2011 Australian Goldfields Open, which helped him enter the top 16 in the rankings for the first time.

At 38, Bingham won the 2015 World Championship, defeating Shaun Murphy 18–15 in the final. The oldest first-time world champion in snooker history, he was the second player, after Ken Doherty, to have won world titles at both amateur and professional levels. His world title took him to a career-high number two in the world rankings, a spot he held until March 2017. In 2017, Bingham received a six-month ban from professional competition after breaching rules concerning betting on matches involving himself and other players. He won his second Triple Crown title at the 2020 Masters, defeating Ali Carter 10–8 in the final. Aged 43 years and 243 days, he superseded Ray Reardon as the oldest Masters' champion, a record he held until Ronnie O'Sullivan won the 2024 Masters aged 48 years and 40 days.

A prolific break-builder, Bingham has compiled over 600 century breaks during his career. He has scored nine career maximum breaks, tied with Judd Trump as the fifth most of any player, behind only Ronnie O'Sullivan (17), John Higgins (13), Stephen Hendry (11), and Shaun Murphy (10).

== Career ==
=== Early career (1995–2010) ===
In 1996, Bingham won both the English Amateur and the World Amateur Championships. The following season, he reached the final of the 1997 World Amateur Championship but lost in a deciding frame to Marco Fu. Bingham played professionally on the World Snooker Tour in 1999 and reached the quarter-final stage of the Welsh Open, defeating the world champion John Higgins along the way. Later in the season, he defeated defending champion Stephen Hendry 10–7 in the first round of the 2000 World Championship, whilst ranked 97th in the world. Jimmy White defeated him in the second round. In 2002, he qualified again for the tournament by beating Nigel Bond in the final qualifying round. Bingham played Ken Doherty in the first round. He attempted a maximum break but missed the final pink ball. The break would have been worth £167,000. He lost the match 8–10.

In the 2004–05 season his best runs were two last 16 places in ranking events, including losing a deciding frame to Ding Junhui in the China Open. Bingham had one of his most consistent seasons in 2005–06. He reached the quarter-finals of the Grand Prix, beating then world champion Shaun Murphy along the way. Bingham got to the same stage of the UK Championship, losing in a deciding frame to Joe Perry. Bingham also won the qualifying tournament for the 2006 Masters, where he made his first maximum break. He then beat Steve Davis in the preliminary round, before losing to Peter Ebdon 4–6 in the first round. Bingham finished the season by qualifying for the 2006 World Snooker Championship, where he lost to Ryan Day. He finished in the top 32 of the world rankings for the first time in his career. At the Masters' qualifying tournament for the 2007 event, Bingham won for a second successive season, defeating Mark Selby 6–2 in the final. He lost 5–6 in the preliminary round to Ali Carter. He lost in qualifying for the 2007 World Snooker Championship in the final round, 5–10 to Fergal O'Brien.

He reached the quarter-finals of the 2007 Shanghai Masters, but Selby defeated him 0–5. At the UK Championship, Bingham reached the last 16, losing to Murphy 3–9, after victories over Fergal O'Brien and Davis. He qualified for the 2008 World Snooker Championship with a 10–3 win over Adrian Gunnell in the final qualifying round. In the opening round of the event, he beat Davis 10–8 but lost in the second round 9–13 to Perry. Bingham lost in the first round in four of the eight events of the 2008–09 season. He was drawn against world number one Ronnie O'Sullivan in the first round of the 2009 World Championship, losing 5–10. Bingham reached the quarter-final stages of the 2010 UK Championship having defeated O'Sullivan 9–6 and Marco Fu 9–2 before losing 7–9 to Mark Allen. Later that season, Bingham qualified for the 2011 World Snooker Championship and beat former champion Ebdon 10–8 in the first round. In the second round he led Ding 12–9 but lost 12–13; had he won, Bingham would have finished in the top 16 in the world rankings for the first time.

=== First ranking event victory (2011–14) ===
At the 2011 Australian Goldfields Open, Bingham defeated Ding 5–3 in the opening round, completed a whitewash over Tom Ford, then secured victories over Allen and Murphy to reach the final. Trailing 5–8 to Mark Williams, Bingham won four frames to win 9–8 and collect $60,000 for the first prize. This, the first ranking event win of his 16-year professional career, was enough to put Bingham up to 11th in the world rankings, and secure a place in the 2012 Masters. He drew Judd Trump in the first round and led 3–2 before losing four frames in a row to exit the tournament 3–6. Bingham could not recapture the form he showed in Australia in the remaining seven ranking events, failing to get past the second round in any of them. A 4–10 loss to Stephen Hendry in the first round of the World Championship ended the 2012 season. Despite the defeat, Bingham finished 16th in the world rankings.

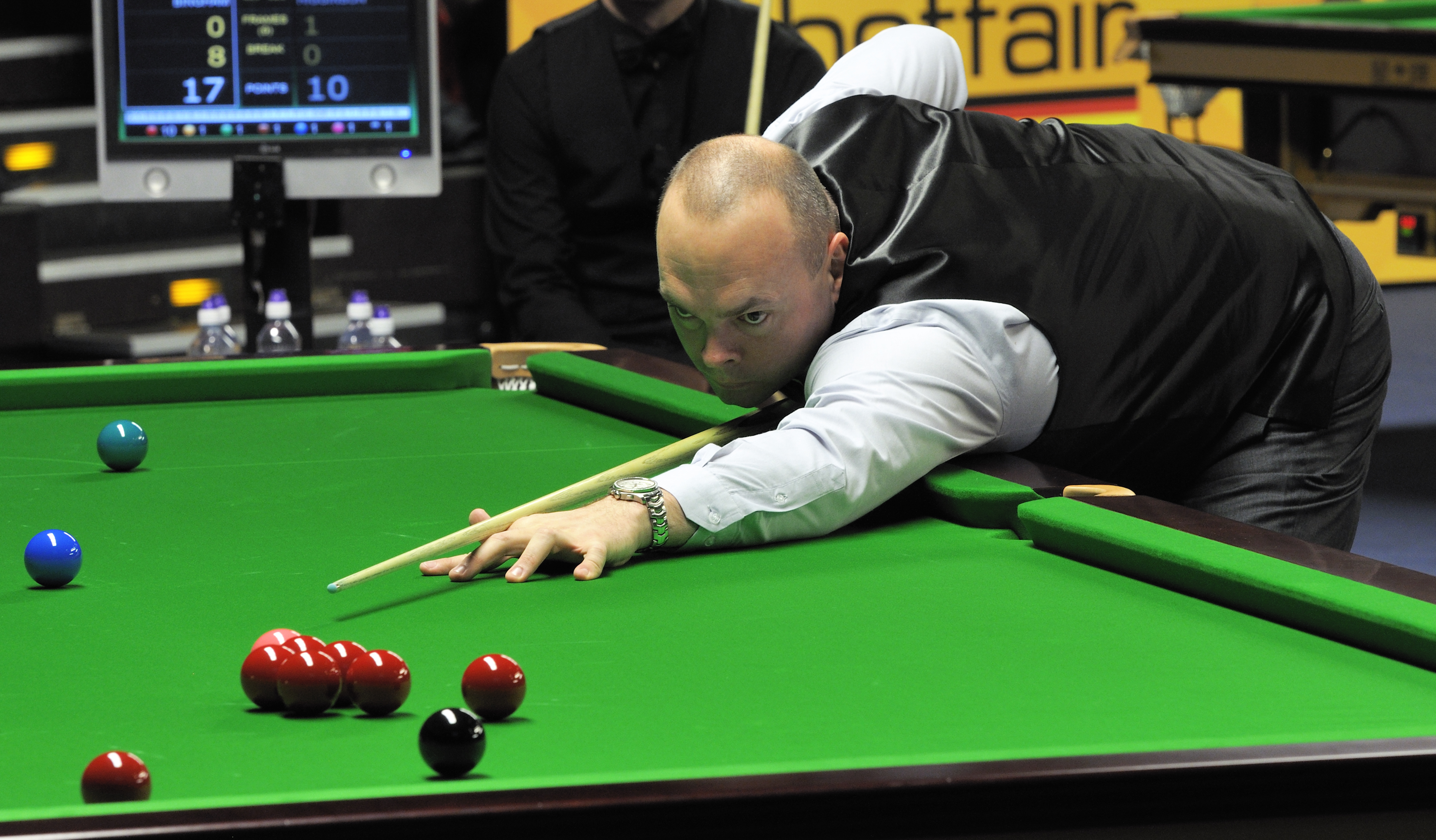
Stuart Bingham at the 2013 German Masters

Bingham won the 2012 Premier League Snooker tournament and contested two ranking event finals in the 2012–13 snooker season. He won the first two non-ranking tournaments beginning with the Pink Ribbon Pro-Am charity tournament where he whitewashed Peter Lines 4–0 in the final. Bingham followed this up by claiming the first Asian Players Tour Championship with a 4–3 victory over Stephen Lee. Bingham won deciding frames in each of his matches to reach the final of the Wuxi Classic, overcoming Peter Ebdon, Ken Doherty, world number one Mark Selby and Mark Davis. He played Ricky Walden but trailed 1–7 at the conclusion of the afternoon's play, before eventually losing 4–10. This ended Bingham's winning start to the season, which had seen him take 16 matches in a row. He was unable to defend his Australian Goldfields Open title losing to Matthew Selt in the first round 4–5.

Bingham won the third event of the Asian Players Tour Championship with a 4–3 victory over Li Hang in the final. He also won the Premier League, defeating Judd Trump 7–2 in the final. At the UK Championship, he reached the quarter-finals but lost 4–6 to Carter. He reached the final 2013 Welsh Open, and led Stephen Maguire 7–5 but eventually lost 8–9. At the 2013 World Snooker Championship, Bingham played world number 83 Sam Baird in the first round, winning 10–2, and Mark Davis in the second round, winning 13–10. Ronnie O'Sullivan defeated him 4–13 in the quarter-finals. He climbed 10 places in the rankings during the season, ending it ranked world number six.

As the 2012 Premier League Snooker winner, Bingham was one of 16 players invited to compete in the 2013 Champion of Champions tournament. He defeated Walden 4–0 in the first round, Trump 6–2 in the quarter-finals, and Selby 6–4 in the semi-finals before losing 8–10 in the final to O'Sullivan. He defeated Jimmy White 6–2, Anthony McGill 6–2, David Morris 6–1, and O'Sullivan 6–4 to reach the semi-finals of the 2013 UK Championship. Robertson led Bingham 8–3 in the semi-final, before Bingham won five frames to force a deciding frame. Robertson took the frame to clinch a 9–8 victory. He reached the final of the Shoot-Out but lost to Dominic Dale. Bingham travelled to China and won the minor-ranking Dongguan Open by seeing off Liang Wenbo 4–1 in the final. Ken Doherty defeated Bingham in the 2014 World Snooker Championship 10–5.

=== World Snooker Champion (2014–18) ===
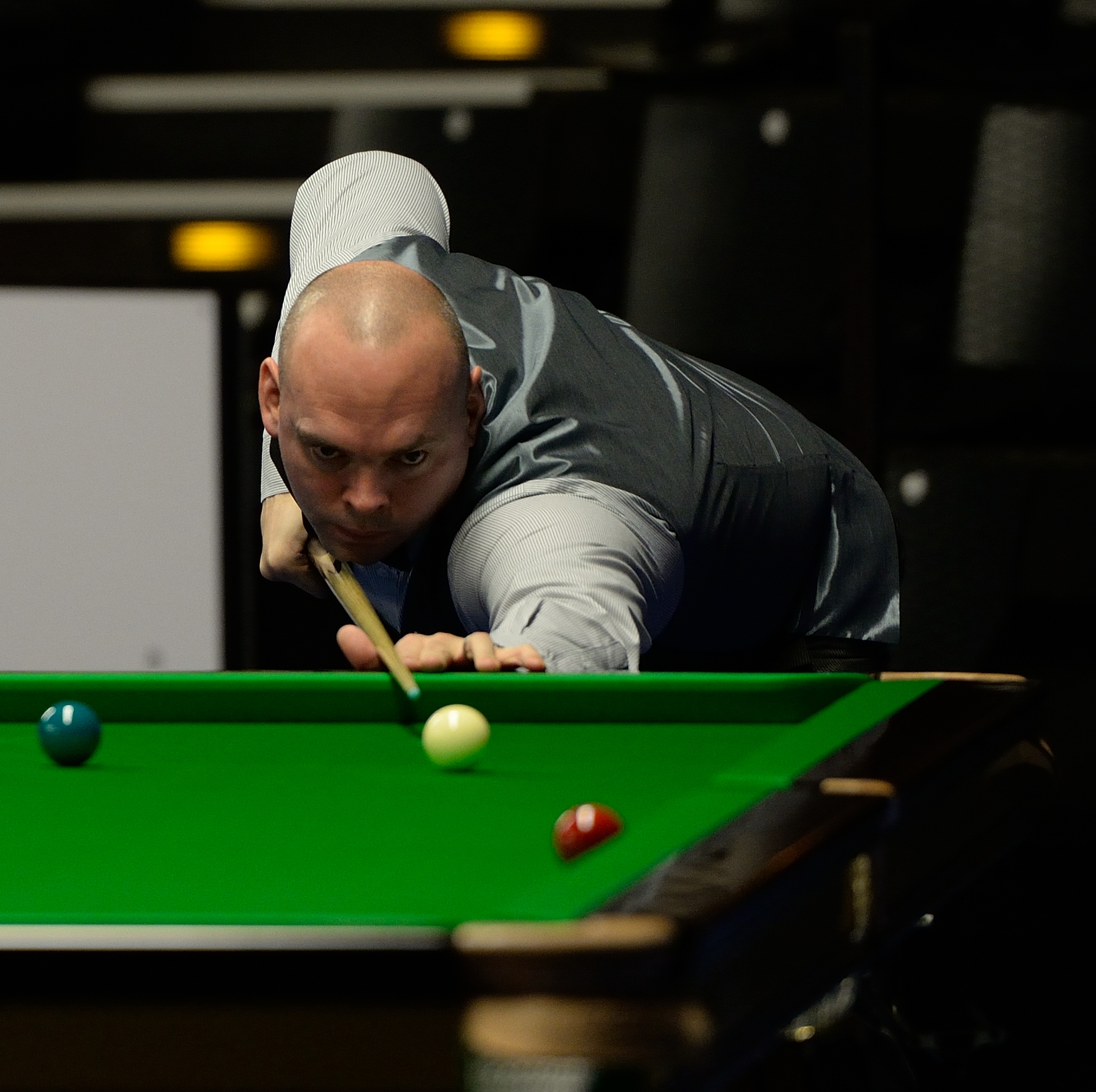
Stuart Bingham at the 2015 German Masters

Bingham defeated Li Hang, Dominic Dale, Alan McManus and Ding at the 2014 Shanghai Masters to reach the final. From 5–3 ahead against Allen, Bingham took five unanswered frames to claim his second ranking title with a 10–3 win. In October, he won the Haining Open by defeating Oliver Lines 4–0 in the final. Bingham reached the semi-final of the UK Championship again in the 2014 event. Though he made a 137 break to establish a 4–1 lead over O'Sullivan he lost 6–5. Bingham won the non-ranking Championship League by beating Mark Davis 3–2. O'Sullivan was again the winner when the pair met in the semi-finals of the inaugural World Grand Prix, whitewashing Bingham 6–0. A further semi-final followed at the PTC Grand Final, but he lost 4–1 to eventual champion Joe Perry.

At the 2015 World Snooker Championship, Bingham defeated Robbie Williams 10–7, Graeme Dott 13–5 and O'Sullivan 13–9 to reach the semi-finals. Bingham led Trump 16–14, and despite Trump winning the next two frames, Bingham won the match 17–16 to reach his first Triple Crown final. Facing Murphy in the final, Bingham recovered from 3–0 and 8–4 down to win 18–15. He commented, "To beat Shaun in the final tops everything off. Twenty years as professional – blood, sweat and tears on the road." After the event, Bingham climbed to world number two, the highest ranking of his career.

Bingham progressed to the semi-finals of the Shanghai Masters but lost 6–3 to Judd Trump. At the 2016 Masters, he beat Ding Junhui 6–4 and John Higgins 6–3 to face Ronnie O'Sullivan in the semi-finals and was defeated 6–3. He overcame a 3–0 deficit to eliminate Joe Perry in the semi-finals 6–5 at the World Grand Prix and reached his first final of the year. In the final, Murphy won 10–9. Bingham lost 5–1 in the quarter-finals of the China Open to Ricky Walden. Defending his title at the 2016 World Snooker Championship, he lost in the opening round 9–10 to Carter.

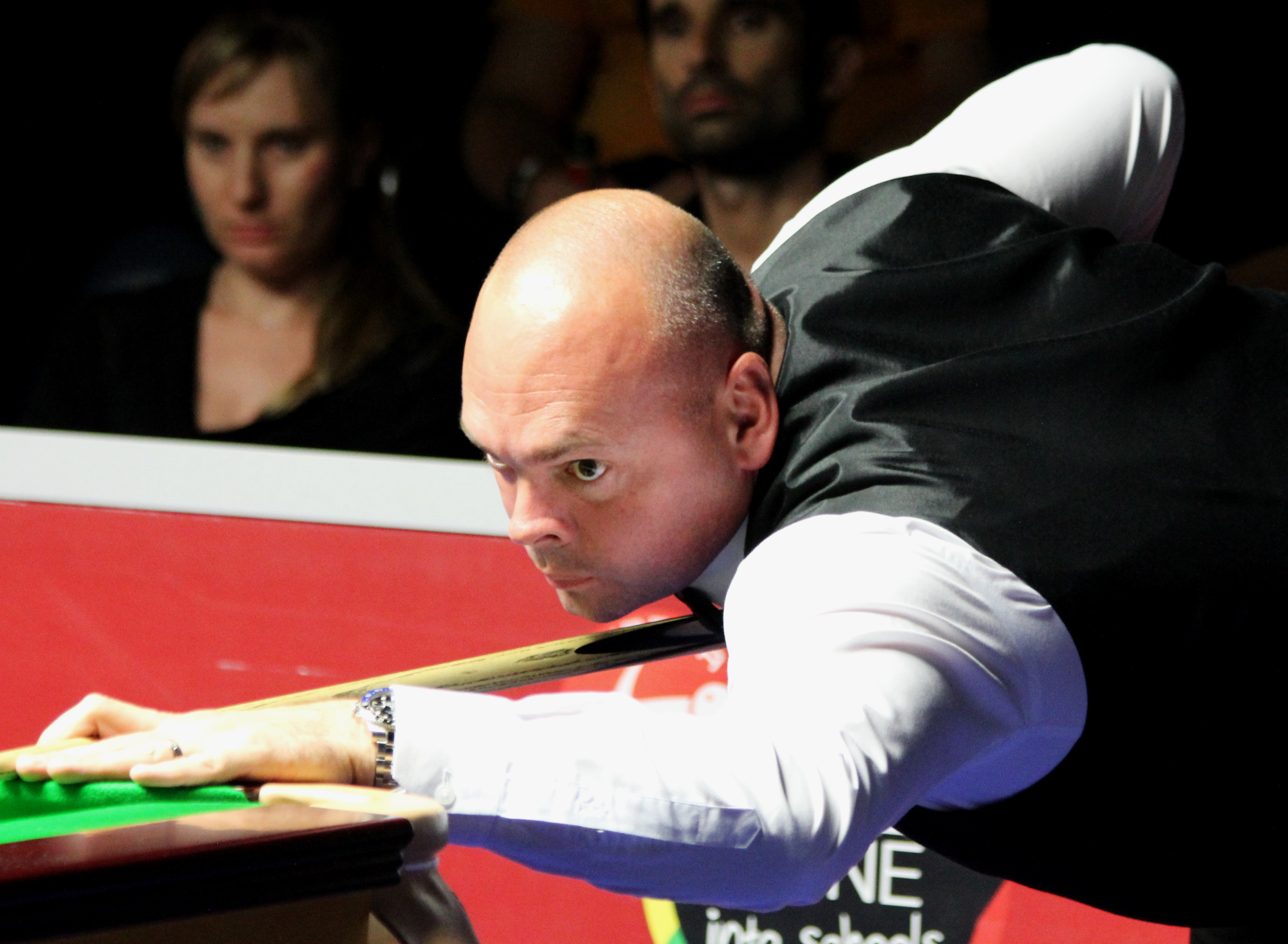
Bingham at the 2016 Paul Hunter Classic

Bingham made it to the final of the Six-red World Championship against Ding. It was decided on the final black ball, which Ding won. Bingham conceded just three frames as he progressed through to the semi-finals of the 2016 Shanghai Masters. He led Selby 5–3 but lost the next three frames 5–6. Bingham lost by the same scoreline in the semi-finals of the English Open, this time to Liang Wenbo. A third ranking event semi-final of the season arrived at the International Championship, but Selby defeated Bingham 9–3 after he had been 2–0 ahead. He reached the invitational China Championship final and was 7–7 with John Higgins, who made three century breaks in a row to beat him 10–7. Bingham exited the Masters in the first round, losing 6–1 to eventual finalist Joe Perry; he lost in the semi-finals of the German Masters 6–4 to Anthony Hamilton.

Bingham reached the final of the 2017 Welsh Open, where he played Trump. He won the first four frames but trailed 8–7. Bingham then won the two frames he needed to claim his fourth ranking title and first since winning the world title. In the second round of the World Championship, he lost the first five frames against Kyren Wilson, who beat him 13–10. Bingham said he would be working with Terry Griffiths for the following season and would be playing with a new cue. However, on 24 October 2017, Bingham was found guilty of breaking World Professional Billiards and Snooker Association rules concerning betting on matches involving himself and other players. He received a six-month ban for betting breaches and was ordered to pay £20,000 in costs. The ban expired at the end of January 2018.

=== Return from ban and Masters champion (2018–present) ===
On returning from the ban, Bingham won the 2018 English Open with a 9–7 win over veteran Mark Davis in the final. He reached the semi-finals of the UK Championship in December 2018, losing in a deciding frame to Mark Allen. At the 2019 Welsh Open, Bingham reached the final but lost 7–9 to Neil Robertson. The following month, he won his second ranking title of the season, the Gibraltar Open, beating defending champion Ryan Day 4–1 in the final.

Bingham reached his first Masters final at the 2020 event. He defeated Williams, Wilson and David Gilbert to meet Carter in the final. Despite trailing after the first session, Bingham won the match 10–8 to win his second Triple Crown. In winning the event, he became the tournament's 24th and then-oldest winner, superseding Ray Reardon, who was five months younger when he won the 1976 Masters. He earned £250,000 in prize money. Bingham's record as the oldest Masters winner lasted until O'Sullivan won the 2024 Masters aged 48 years and 40 days.

In November 2020, Bingham made the seventh maximum break of his career in the first round of the 2020 UK Championship, beating Zak Surety by 6–2. However, he lost to Dott in the last 32. Despite being Masters champion, Bingham was no longer ranked in the top 16, so had to qualify for the 2021 World Snooker Championship. He defeated Luca Brecel 10–5 in the final qualifying round to reach the main stage. He drew Ding Junhui in the first round, and beat him 10–9. In the second round, he defeated Jamie Jones 13–6, and then Anthony McGill in the quarter-finals. He played Selby in the semi-final but lost 15–17, accusing Selby of possible gamesmanship.

At the 2022 World Championship, Bingham defeated Lyu Haotian 10–5 and Kyren Wilson 13–9 to reach the quarter-final stage. In his quarter-final against Trump, Bingham led 8‍–‍5 before losing eight consecutive frames on the way to an 8–13 defeat.

Bingham defeated Gilbert 10–4 in the first round at the 2023 World Championship. He then lost his second round match to Allen 4–13 which resulted in Bingham dropping out of the top sixteen in the world rankings.

Bingham beat O'Sullivan in the quarter-finals of the 2024 World Championship 13‍–‍10, before losing his semi-final against Jak Jones 12–17.

In the 2024 UK Championship, Bingham beat Mark Williams in the first round after coming from 2–5 down to win 6–5. In his last-16 match against Zhang Anda, Bingham took a 5–1 lead but then lost five consecutive frames to lose 5‍–‍6. Bingham reached his first ranking event final for six years at the 2025 World Grand Prix, however he was whitewashed 0–10 in the final by Neil Robertson. Bingham failed to qualify for the 2025 World Championship after a defeat to Michael Holt during the qualifying rounds.

In December 2025, Bingham reached the final of the Snooker Shoot Out where he was defeated by Alfie Burden. Ranked 17th in the world rankings, Bingham missed out on automatic qualification for the 2026 World Snooker Championship, and his attempt to progress through the qualifiers ended with a 7–10 defeat to Stevens.

== Legacy ==
Bingham has compiled over 600 century breaks in professional competition, putting him eleventh on the all-time list. Having made nine maximum breaks, he has made the fourth most of any player behind O'Sullivan (17), Higgins (13) and Hendry (11). Doherty and Bingham are the only players to have won both the amateur and professional world snooker championships.

== Personal life ==
Bingham married Michelle in 2013 in a ceremony held in Cyprus. He moved the date of his wedding and cancelled his bachelor's party to make sure he could play in snooker competitions. The couple have a son, born in 2011; a daughter, born in January 2017; and Michelle's daughter born in 2003. Bingham was once a keen amateur golfer, but made the decision to play less golf so that he could focus on snooker.

Bingham is nicknamed "ball-run", which stems from a reputation for having fortune on his side, or ‘getting the run of the ball’ in matches.

== Performance and rankings timeline ==
Tournament	1995/ 96	1996/ 97	1997/ 98	1998/ 99	1999/ 00	2000/ 01	2001/ 02	2002/ 03	2003/ 04	2004/ 05	2005/ 06	2006/ 07	2007/ 08	2008/ 09	2009/ 10	2010/ 11	2011/ 12	2012/ 13	2013/ 14	2014/ 15	2015/ 16	2016/ 17	2017/ 18	2018/ 19	2019/ 20		2020/ 21	2021/ 22	2022/ 23	2023/ 24	2024/ 25	2025/ 26	2026/ 27
Ranking (Note: It shows the ranking at the beginning of the season)	(Note: New players on the Main Tour don't have a ranking)	327	(Note: He was an amateur)		93	43	44	57	43	37	37	24	23	21	21	29	17	16	6	12	2	2	9	13	13		13	15	13	23	25	22	21
Ranking tournaments
Championship League	Tournament Not Held												Non-Ranking Event														2R	2R	3R	RR	2R	2R	RR
China Open (Note: The event was called the China International (1997/1998–1998/1999))	Not Held		NR	LQ	2R	LQ	LQ	Not Held		2R	1R	2R	1R	LQ	LQ	1R	2R	QF	WD	2R	QF	3R	QF	QF	Tournament Not Held								SF
Wuhan Open	Tournament Not Held																													2R	LQ	LQ	LQ
British Open	LQ	LQ	A	LQ	1R	1R	LQ	LQ	1R	3R	Tournament Not Held																	2R	1R	1R	2R	1R	LQ
English Open	Tournament Not Held																					SF	3R	W	2R		2R	1R	LQ	LQ	1R	2R	1R
Shenzhen Open (Note: The event was called the Xi'an Grand Prix (2024/2025–2025/2026))	Tournament Not Held																														2R	3R	1R
Northern Ireland Open	Tournament Not Held																					A	A	1R	3R		2R	3R	1R	2R	3R	1R	2R
International Championship	Tournament Not Held																	1R	3R	3R	1R	SF	WD	1R	2R		Not Held			2R	1R	1R	1R
UK Championship	LQ	LQ	A	LQ	LQ	1R	LQ	1R	2R	LQ	QF	3R	2R	1R	2R	QF	1R	QF	SF	SF	3R	2R	A	SF	4R		3R	3R	2R	LQ	2R	LQ	
Shoot Out	Tournament Not Held															Non-Ranking Event						1R	4R	QF	1R		1R	3R	1R	1R	1R	F	
Scottish Open (Note: The event was called the International Open (1995/1996–1996/1997) and the Players Championship (2003/2004))	LQ	LQ	A	LQ	LQ	LQ	1R	1R	2R	Tournament Not Held								MR	Not Held			1R	A	1R	1R		4R	LQ	LQ	QF	3R	3R	
German Masters (Note: The event was called the German Open (1995/1996–1997/1998))	LQ	LQ	A	NR	Tournament Not Held											LQ	2R	1R	1R	2R	2R	SF	A	2R	LQ		QF	LQ	LQ	LQ	1R	QF	
Welsh Open	LQ	LQ	A	QF	2R	LQ	LQ	LQ	LQ	1R	LQ	2R	3R	LQ	1R	1R	2R	F	4R	4R	1R	W	3R	F	3R		1R	1R	LQ	LQ	1R	QF	
World Grand Prix	Tournament Not Held																			NR	F	1R	2R	2R	1R		2R	SF	1R	DNQ	F	1R	
Players Championship (Note: The event was called the Players Tour Championship Grand Final (2010/2011–2015/2016))	Tournament Not Held															2R	DNQ	1R	1R	SF	DNQ	1R	DNQ	QF	DNQ		QF	DNQ	DNQ	DNQ	1R	DNQ	
World Open (Note: The event was called the Grand Prix (1995/1996–2000/2001 and 2004/2005–2009/2010) and the LG Cup (2001/2002–2003/2004))	LQ	LQ	A	LQ	LQ	LQ	LQ	LQ	2R	LQ	QF	RR	RR	LQ	1R	LQ	1R	2R	2R	Not Held		2R	2R	LQ	QF		Not Held			LQ	LQ	2R	
Tour Championship	Tournament Not Held																							QF	DNQ		DNQ	DNQ	DNQ	DNQ	DNQ	DNQ	
World Championship	LQ	LQ	LQ	LQ	2R	LQ	1R	LQ	LQ	LQ	LQ	LQ	2R	1R	LQ	2R	1R	QF	1R	W	1R	2R	1R	2R	2R		SF	QF	2R	SF	LQ	LQ	
Non-ranking tournaments
Shanghai Masters	Tournament Not Held												Ranking Event											QF	1R		Not Held			A	A	A	
Champion of Champions	Tournament Not Held																		F	1R	1R	QF	WD	1R	1R		1R	1R	A	A	A	A	
The Masters	LQ	LQ	LQ	LQ	LQ	LQ	LQ	LQ	LQ	A	1R	WR	LQ	LQ	LQ	A	1R	1R	1R	1R	SF	1R	A	1R	W		SF	1R	SF	A	A	A	
Championship League	Tournament Not Held												RR	SF	RR	RR	RR	RR	RR	W	RR	RR	A	2R	2R	3R	RR	F	2R	SF	RR	RR	
Former ranking tournaments
Asian Classic (Note: The event was called the Thailand Classic (1995/1996))	LQ	LQ	Tournament Not Held																														
Malta Grand Prix	Non-Ranking Event				LQ	NR	Tournament Not Held																										
Thailand Masters (Note: The event was called the Thailand Open (1995/1996–1996/1997))	LQ	LQ	A	LQ	LQ	LQ	1R	NR	Not Held			NR	Tournament Not Held																				
Irish Masters	Non-Ranking Event							1R	1R	LQ	NH	NR	Tournament Not Held																				
Northern Ireland Trophy	Tournament Not Held										NR	1R	1R	1R	Tournament Not Held																		
Bahrain Championship	Tournament Not Held													1R	Tournament Not Held																		
Wuxi Classic (Note: The event was called the Jiangsu Classic (2008/2009–2009/2010))	Tournament Not Held													Non-Ranking Event				F	2R	3R	Tournament Not Held												
Australian Goldfields Open (Note: The event was called the Australian Open (1995/1996) and the Australian Masters (1995/1996))	NR	Tournament Not Held															W	1R	2R	QF	1R	Tournament Not Held											
Shanghai Masters	Tournament Not Held												QF	2R	2R	2R	2R	QF	1R	W	SF	SF	WD	Non-Ranking			Not Held			Non-Ranking Event			
Paul Hunter Classic (Note: The event was called the Grand Prix Fürth (2004/2005) and the Fürth German Open (2005/2006–2006/2007))	Tournament Not Held									Pro-am Event						Minor-Ranking Event						2R	1R	A	NR		Tournament Not Held						
Indian Open	Tournament Not Held																		3R	A	NH	3R	3R	3R	Tournament Not Held								
Riga Masters (Note: The event was called the Riga Open (2014/2015–2015/2016))	Tournament Not Held																			Minor-Rank		3R	1R	LQ	LQ		Tournament Not Held						
China Championship	Tournament Not Held																					NR	1R	2R	LQ		Tournament Not Held						
WST Pro Series	Tournament Not Held																										3R	Tournament Not Held					
Turkish Masters	Tournament Not Held																											LQ	Tournament Not Held				
Gibraltar Open	Tournament Not Held																				MR	A	QF	W	3R		2R	QF	Tournament Not Held				
WST Classic	Tournament Not Held																												QF	Tournament Not Held			
European Masters (Note: The event was called the European Open (1995/1996–1996/1997 and 2001/2002–2003/2004), the Irish Open (1998/1999) and the Malta Cup (2004/2005–2007/2008))	LQ	LQ	NH	LQ	Not Held		LQ	LQ	LQ	LQ	2R	1R	NR	Tournament Not Held								LQ	F	2R	LQ		4R	LQ	2R	1R	Not Held		
Saudi Arabia Masters	Tournament Not Held																														6R	6R	NH
Former non-ranking tournaments
Scottish Masters	A	A	A	A	A	LQ	A	A	Tournament Not Held																								
Masters Qualifying Event (Note: The event was called the Benson & Hedges Championship (1993/1994-2002/2003))	LQ	LQ	LQ	LQ	2R	F	1R	QF	QF	NH	W	W	LQ	QF	1R	Tournament Not Held																	
Brazil Masters	Tournament Not Held																1R	Tournament Not Held															
Irish Classic	Tournament Not Held												SF	A	A	A	A	Tournament Not Held															
Premier League (Note: The event was called the European League (1995/1996–1996/1997))	A	A	A	A	A	A	A	A	A	A	A	A	A	A	A	A	A	W	Tournament Not Held														
World Grand Prix	Tournament Not Held																			SF	Ranking Event												
Shoot Out	Tournament Not Held															3R	2R	1R	F	2R	2R	Ranking Event											
China Championship	Tournament Not Held																					F	Ranking Event				Tournament Not Held						
Romanian Masters	Tournament Not Held																						F	Tournament Not Held									
Six-red World Championship (Note: The event was called the Six-red Snooker International (2008/2009) and the Six-red World Grand Prix (2009/2010))	Tournament Not Held													F	3R	2R	NH	2R	SF	3R	2R	F	2R	QF	QF		Not Held		QF	Tournament Not Held			
Haining Open	Tournament Not Held																			Minor-Rank		A	SF	A	4R		NH	A	A	Tournament Not Held			

Performance Table Legend
LQ	lost in the qualifying draw	#R	lost in the early rounds of the tournament (WR = Wildcard round, RR = Round robin)	QF	lost in the quarter-finals
SF	lost in the semi-finals	F	lost in the final	W	won the tournament
DNQ	did not qualify for the tournament	A	did not participate in the tournament	WD	withdrew from the tournament

NH / Not Held	means an event was not held.
NR / Non-Ranking Event	means an event is/was no longer a ranking event.
R / Ranking Event	means an event is/was a ranking event.
MR / Minor-Ranking Event	means an event is/was a minor-ranking event.
PA / Pro-am Event	means an event is/was a pro-am event.

== Career finals ==
=== Ranking finals: 13 (6 titles) ===
Legend
World Championship (1–0)
Other (5–7)

Outcome	No.	Year	Championship	Opponent in the final	Score
Winner	1.	2011	Australian Goldfields Open	(Wales) Mark Williams	9–8
Runner-up	1.	2012	Wuxi Classic	(England) Ricky Walden	4–10
Runner-up	2.	2013	Welsh Open	(Scotland) Stephen Maguire	8–9
Winner	2.	2014	Shanghai Masters	(Northern Ireland) Mark Allen	10–3
Winner	3.	2015	World Snooker Championship	(England) Shaun Murphy	18–15
Runner-up	3.	2016	World Grand Prix	(England) Shaun Murphy	9–10
Winner	4.	2017	Welsh Open	(England) Judd Trump	9–8
Runner-up	4.	2017	European Masters	(England) Judd Trump	7–9
Winner	5.	2018	English Open	(England) Mark Davis	9–7
Runner-up	5.	2019	Welsh Open (2)	(Australia) Neil Robertson	7–9
Winner	6.	2019	Gibraltar Open	(Wales) Ryan Day	4–1
Runner-up	6.	2025	World Grand Prix (2)	(Australia) Neil Robertson	0–10
Runner-up	7.	2025	Snooker Shoot Out	(England) Alfie Burden	0–1

=== Minor-ranking finals: 4 (4 titles) ===
Outcome	No.	Year	Championship	Opponent in the final	Score
Winner	1.	2012	Zhangjiagang Open	(England) Stephen Lee	4–3
Winner	2.	2012	Zhengzhou Open	(China) Li Hang	4–3
Winner	3.	2014	Dongguan Open	(China) Liang Wenbo	4–1
Winner	4.	2014	Haining Open	(England) Oliver Lines	4–0

=== Non-ranking finals: 16 (8 titles) ===
Legend
The Masters (1–0)
Champion of Champions (0–1)
Premier League (1–0)
Other (6–7)

Outcome	No.	Year	Championship	Opponent in the final	Score
Winner	1.	1999	UK Tour – Event 3	(England) Matthew Couch	6–1
Winner	2.	1999	Merseyside Professional Championship	(England) Stuart Pettman	5–1
Runner-up	1.	2000	Benson & Hedges Championship	(England) Shaun Murphy	7–9
Winner	3.	2002	WPBSA Open Tour – Event 6	(England) Matthew Selt	5–4
Winner	4.	2005	Masters Qualifying Event	(England) Ali Carter	6–3
Winner	5.	2006	Masters Qualifying Event (2)	(England) Mark Selby	6–2
Runner-up	2.	2008	Six-red Snooker International	(England) Ricky Walden	3–8
Winner	6.	2012	Premier League	(England) Judd Trump	7–2
Runner-up	3.	2013	Champion of Champions	(England) Ronnie O'Sullivan	8–10
Runner-up	4.	2014	Snooker Shoot Out	(Wales) Dominic Dale	0–1
Winner	7.	2015	Championship League	(England) Mark Davis	3–2
Runner-up	5.	2016	Six-red World Championship (2)	(China) Ding Junhui	7–8
Runner-up	6.	2016	China Championship	(Scotland) John Higgins	7–10
Runner-up	7.	2018	Romanian Masters	(Wales) Ryan Day	8–10
Winner	8.	2020	The Masters	(England) Ali Carter	10–8
Runner-up	8.	2022	Championship League Invitational	(Scotland) John Higgins	2–3

=== Pro-am finals: 13 (11 titles) ===
Outcome	No.	Year	Championship	Opponent in the final	Score
Winner	1.	2004	Pontins Spring Open	(England) Wayne Cooper	5–3
Winner	2.	2004	Pontins Autumn Open	(England) Mark Davis	5–2
Winner	3.	2006	Pontins Spring Open (2)	(England) Tom Harris	5–2
Runner-up	1.	2007	Pontins Pro-Am – Event 3	(England) Joe Perry	0–4
Winner	4.	2008	Pontins Pro-Am – Event 1	(England) Judd Trump	4–3
Winner	5.	2008	Pontins Pro-Am – Event 2	(England) Robbie Williams	4–1
Runner-up	2.	2008	Pontins Pro-Am – Event 4	(England) Joe Perry	3–4
Winner	6.	2008	Dutch Open	(Northern Ireland) Joe Swail	6–3
Winner	7.	2009	Pontins Spring Open (3)	(England) Matthew Couch	5–1
Winner	8.	2009	Paul Hunter English Open	(England) Simon Bedford	6–0
Winner	9.	2009	Pontins World Series Grand Final	(Republic of Ireland) Ken Doherty	3–1
Winner	10.	2012	Pink Ribbon	(England) Peter Lines	4–0
Winner	11.	2019	Pink Ribbon (2)	(Northern Ireland) Mark Allen	4–3

=== Amateur finals: 4 (2 titles) ===
Outcome	No.	Year	Championship	Opponent in the final	Score
Winner	1.	1996	English Amateur Championship	(England) Peter Lines	8–4
Winner	2.	1996	World Amateur Championship	(Australia) Stan Gorski	11–5
Runner-up	1.	1997	World Amateur Championship	(Hong Kong) Marco Fu	10–11
Runner-up	2.	1998	English Open	(England) Shailesh Jogia	2–5
