= Paul Mifsud =

Maltese snooker player

Personal information
- Born: 1945 or 1946

Sport
- Country: Malta
- Sport: Snooker
- Professional: 1983–1985
- Highest ranking: 49 (1983–1984)
- Best ranking finish: Last 32 (x1)

Paul Mifsud is a Maltese former professional snooker player.

== Career ==
Mifsud turned professional in 1983, and in the primitive world rankings at this time, was placed 49th. He was relegated from the snooker tour two seasons later, and has since competed as an amateur.

Mifsud's most notable performance was in reaching the last 32 of the 1984 World Championship, where he lost 2–10 to Terry Griffiths. He was twice World Amateur champion, in 1985 and 1986, defeating Dilwyn John 11–6 in the former and Kerry Jones 11–9 in the latter, and had reached the final in 1976, where he lost 1–11 to the rising Doug Mountjoy.

== Performance and rankings timeline ==
Tournament	1983/ 84	1984/ 85	1990/ 91	1995/ 96	1996/ 97
Ranking (Note: It shows the ranking at the beginning of the season.)	(Note: New players on the Main Tour don't have a ranking.)	49	(Note: He was an amateur.)		
Ranking tournaments
International Open	A	LQ	NH	A	A
Grand Prix (Note: The event was called the Professional Players Tournament (1983/1984))	LQ	LQ	A	A	A
World Championship	1R	A	A	A	A
Non-ranking tournaments
Malta Grand Prix	Tournament Not Held			1R	1R
Former ranking tournaments
Classic	LQ	A	A	Not Held	
Former non-ranking tournaments
World Masters	Not Held		1R	Not Held	

Performance Table Legend
LQ	lost in the qualifying draw	#R	lost in the early rounds of the tournament (WR = Wildcard round, RR = Round robin)	QF	lost in the quarter-finals
SF	lost in the semi-finals	F	lost in the final	W	won the tournament
DNQ	did not qualify for the tournament	A	did not participate in the tournament	WD	withdrew from the tournament

NH / Not Held	means an event was not held.
NR / Non-Ranking Event	means an event is/was no longer a ranking event.
R / Ranking Event	means an event is/was a ranking event.
MR / Minor-Ranking Event	means an event is/was a minor-ranking event.
PA / Pro-am Event	means an event is/was a pro-am event.
