= 1982 International Open =

1982 Jameson International Open
Tournament information
- Dates: 27 September – 10 October 1982
- Venue: Assembly Rooms
- City: Derby
- Country: England
- Organisation: WPBSA
- Format: Ranking event
- Total prize fund: £75,000
- Winner's share: £22,000
- Highest break: Tony Knowles (ENG) (114)

Final
- Champion: Tony Knowles (ENG)
- Runner-up: David Taylor (ENG)
- Score: 9–6

The 1982 International Open (officially the 1982 Jameson International Open) was a professional ranking snooker tournament that took place between 27 September to 10 October 1982 at the Assembly Rooms in Derby, England. This was the first tournament outside of the World Snooker Championship to be given ranking status. Tony Knowles won the tournament, defeating David Taylor 9–6 in the final.

== Summary ==
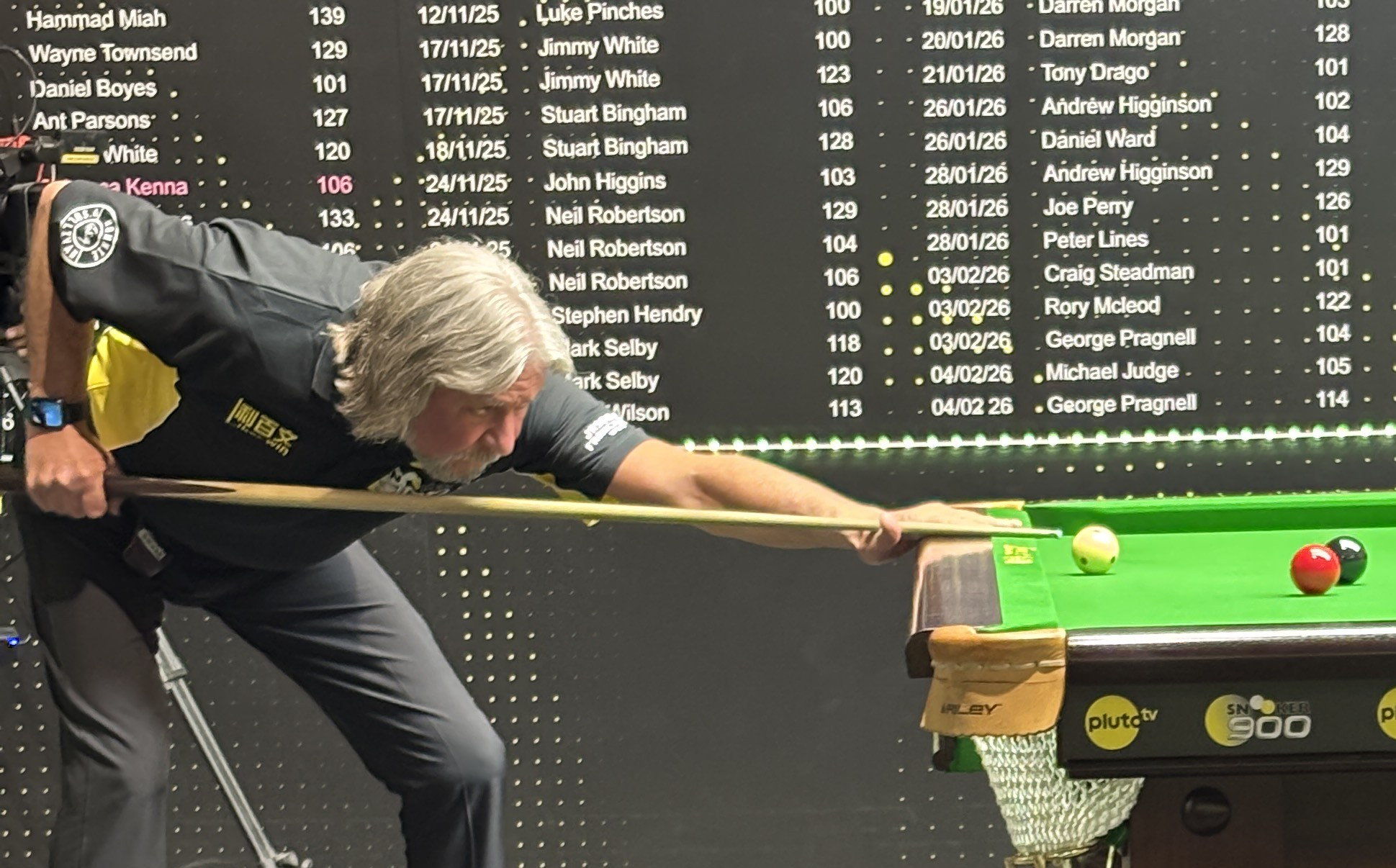
Tony Knowles (pictured in 2026) won the tournament

The WPBSA had been using a ranking system based on performances in the last three world championships. However they modified the system for the 1982–83 season to include the two open entry events in the ranking system. These were the Jameson International Open and the Professional Players Tournament which was held immediately afterwards. The 1982 Jameson International Open thus became the first tournament, other than the world championship, in which players earned ranking points.

The last-32 stage of the £75,000 event, in which the top 16 seeds met 16 qualifiers, was played at the Assembly Rooms, Derby from Monday 27 September to Thursday 30 September. Steve Davis played on the first day, having won the Langs Scottish Masters the previous evening. Alex Higgins was penalised a frame for arriving late for his match against Billy Kelly but won the match 5–3.

Television coverage started at the last-16 stage, which was played from Saturday 2 October to Tuesday 5 October. Terry Griffiths beat world champion Alex Higgins 5–2 after Higgins had won the first two frames. Dennis Taylor beat Cliff Thorburn 5–2. Thorburn won the first two frames but Taylor took the next five to win the match. Cliff Wilson beat Jimmy White 5–2 in a match that last just 95 minutes. John Virgo beat John Spencer 5–4 after winning the final two frames, while Tony Knowles beat Ray Reardon 5–2 in the final match of the round.

The quarter-finals were played on Wednesday and Thursday. David Taylor beat Steve Davis, the defending champion, 5–3. Davis led 3–2 but Taylor won the next three to record his first win over Davis. John Virgo beat Dennis Taylor 5–3 in Wednesday's other match. On Thursday, Tony Knowles beat Cliff Wilson 5–4 while Kirk Stevens beat Terry Griffiths 5–3 after winning the first three frames.

David Taylor beat John Virgo 9–5 in the first semi-final. Taylor won the last four frames of the afternoon session to lead 6–2 and then won the first frame of the evening session. Virgo then won two frames to trail 4–7 but Taylor won two of the next three to win the match. Tony Knowles beat Kirk Stevens 9–3 in the second semi-final played on the Saturday. Knowles won the first four frames and led 5–3 after the afternoon session. He won the first four frames in the evening to take the match.

Tony Knowles beat David Taylor 9–6 in the final, winning the first prize of £22,000 with Taylor winning £12,000. Knowles won three frames in a row to take a 5–2 lead before Taylor won the last frame of the afternoon session to trail 3–5. Knowles made a break of 114 in the first frame of the evening session and later extended his lead to 8–5. Taylor won the next frame but Knowles then made a break of 76 in the following frame to win the match. He also won the high break prize of £1,200 for his 114 in the final.

== Main draw ==
Last 32; Best of 9 frames
1 | Steve Davis (ENG) | 5
Colin Roscoe (WAL) | 1
16 | Willie Thorne (ENG) | 3
Dean Reynolds (ENG) | 5
8 | David Taylor (ENG) | 5
Mick Fisher (ENG) | 4
9 | Bill Werbeniuk (CAN) | 5
Jim Wych (CAN) | 3
5 | Eddie Charlton (AUS) | 4
John Virgo (ENG) | 5
12 | John Spencer (ENG) | 5
Ray Edmonds (ENG) | 2
4 | Cliff Thorburn (CAN) | 5
George Scott (ENG) | 1
13 | Dennis Taylor (NIR) | 5
Mark Wildman (ENG) | 2
3 | Alex Higgins (NIR) | 5
Billy Kelly (IRL) | 3
14 | Terry Griffiths (WAL) | 5
Rex Williams (ENG) | 2
6 | Kirk Stevens (CAN) | 5
Mike Watterson (ENG) | 3
11 | Perrie Mans (RSA) | 5
Les Dodd (ENG) | 3
7 | Doug Mountjoy (WAL) | 1
Cliff Wilson (WAL) | 5
10 | Jimmy White (ENG) | 5
Jim Meadowcroft (ENG) | 1
2 | Ray Reardon (WAL) | 5
Eugene Hughes (IRL) | 3
15 | Tony Knowles (ENG) | 5
Eddie Sinclair (SCO) | 2

Last 16; Best of 9 frames
1 | (England) Steve Davis | 5
(England) Dean Reynolds | 0
8 | (England) David Taylor | 5
9 | (Canada) Bill Werbeniuk | 2
(England) John Virgo | 5
12 | (England) John Spencer | 4
4 | (Canada) Cliff Thorburn | 2
13 | (Northern Ireland) Dennis Taylor | 5
3 | (Northern Ireland) Alex Higgins | 2
14 | (Wales) Terry Griffiths | 5
6 | (Canada) Kirk Stevens | 5
11 | (South Africa) Perrie Mans | 2
(Wales) Cliff Wilson | 5
10 | (England) Jimmy White | 2
2 | (Wales) Ray Reardon | 2
15 | (England) Tony Knowles | 5

Quarter-finals; Best of 9 frames
1 | (England) Steve Davis | 3
8 | (England) David Taylor | 5
(England) John Virgo | 5
13 | (Northern Ireland) Dennis Taylor | 3
14 | (Wales) Terry Griffiths | 3
6 | (Canada) Kirk Stevens | 5
(Wales) Cliff Wilson | 4
15 | (England) Tony Knowles | 5

Semi-finals; Best of 17 frames
8 | (England) David Taylor | 9
(England) John Virgo | 5
6 | (Canada) Kirk Stevens | 3
15 | (England) Tony Knowles | 9

Final; Best of 17 frames
8 | (England) David Taylor | 6
15 | (England) Tony Knowles | 9

=== Final ===
Final: Best of 17 frames. Referee: Len Ganley; Assembly Rooms, Derby, England, 10 October 1982.
| David Taylor; England | 6–9 | Tony Knowles; England |
Afternoon: 60–56, 1–108, 39–85, 89–27, 6–111, 45–70, 2–107, 96–27; Evening: 9–115 (114), 62–36, 59–35, 7–80, 49–64, 83–6, 0–82
| 74 | Highest break | 114 |
| 0 | Century breaks | 1 |
