= 1981 Yamaha Organs Trophy =

Tournament information
- Dates: 2–8 March 1981
- Venue: Assembly Rooms
- City: Derby
- Country: England
- Organisation: WPBSA
- Format: Non-ranking event
- Total prize fund: £35,000
- Winner's share: £
- Highest break: (England) Steve Davis (135)

Final
- Champion: (England) Steve Davis
- Runner-up: (England) David Taylor
- Score: 9–6

The 1981 Yamaha Organs Trophy was a non-ranking snooker tournament, that was held between 2 and 8 March 1981 at the Assembly Rooms in Derby, England.

== Main draw ==
=== Group 1 ===
| Player 1 | Score | Player 2 | Date |
|---|---|---|---|
| (England) David Taylor | 3–0 | (Wales) Doug Mountjoy | |
| (England) David Taylor | 2–1 | (England) Graham Miles | |
| (Wales) Ray Reardon | 3–0 | (England) Graham Miles | |
| (Wales) Ray Reardon | 2–1 | (England) David Taylor | |
| (Wales) Doug Mountjoy | 3–0 | (England) Graham Miles | |
| (Wales) Ray Reardon | 0–3 | (Wales) Doug Mountjoy | |

=== Group 2 ===
| Player 1 | Score | Player 2 | Date |
|---|---|---|---|
| (Wales) Terry Griffiths | 0–3 | (Canada) Kirk Stevens | |
| (Canada) Kirk Stevens | 2–1 | (Canada) Bill Werbeniuk | |
| (Canada) Kirk Stevens | 1–2 | (England) Mike Hallett | |
| (Canada) Bill Werbeniuk | 1–2 | (England) Mike Hallett | |
| (Wales) Terry Griffiths | 3–0 | (Canada) Bill Werbeniuk | |
| (Wales) Terry Griffiths | 2–1 | (England) Mike Hallett | |

=== Group 3 ===
| Player 1 | Score | Player 2 | Date |
|---|---|---|---|
| (Northern Ireland) Alex Higgins | 0–3 | (Northern Ireland) Dennis Taylor | |
| (Northern Ireland) Dennis Taylor | 2–1 | (England) Ray Edmonds | |
| (Northern Ireland) Alex Higgins | 3–0 | (England) Fred Davis | |
| (Northern Ireland) Alex Higgins | 2–1 | (England) Ray Edmonds | |
| (England) Fred Davis | 1–2 | (England) Ray Edmonds | |
| (England) Fred Davis | 2–1 | (Northern Ireland) Dennis Taylor | |

=== Group 4 ===
| Player 1 | Score | Player 2 | Date |
|---|---|---|---|
| (Canada) Cliff Thorburn | 0–3 | (England) Jimmy White | |
| (Canada) Cliff Thorburn | 2–1 | (England) John Virgo | |
| (England) John Virgo | 1–2 | (England) Jimmy White | |
| (England) Steve Davis | 3–0 | (England) Jimmy White | |
| (England) Steve Davis | 3–0 | (England) John Virgo | |
| (Canada) Cliff Thorburn | 1–2 | (England) Steve Davis | |

=== Semi-finals ===
| Player 1 | Score | Player 2 | Date |
|---|---|---|---|
| (England) Steve Davis | 5–2 | (Northern Ireland) Dennis Taylor | |
| (Canada) Kirk Stevens | 3–5 | (England) David Taylor | |

=== Final ===
Final: Best of 17 frames. Referee: Assembly Rooms, Derby, England. 8 March 1981.
| Steve Davis; England | 9–6 | David Taylor; England |
75–59, 40–81, 115–24 (75), 87–24 (56), 92–34, 76–32 (76), 21–71, 88–34 (73), 68–36, 100–36, 52–60, 0–88 (62), 61–70, 21–110, 66–36
| 76 | Highest break | 62 |
| 0 | Century breaks | 0 |
| 4 | 50+ breaks | 1 |

== Qualifying ==
=== Group 1 ===
| Player 1 | Score | Player 2 | Date |
|---|---|---|---|
| (Wales) Cliff Wilson | 3–0 | (England) Mark Wildman | |
| (England) Graham Miles | 3–0 | (England) Tony Meo | |
| (England) Graham Miles | 2–1 | (England) Mark Wildman | |
| (England) Graham Miles | 2–1 | (Wales) Cliff Wilson | |
| (England) Tony Meo | 3–0 | (England) Mark Wildman | |
| (England) Tony Meo | 2–1 | (Wales) Cliff Wilson | |

=== Group 2 ===
| Player 1 | Score | Player 2 | Date |
|---|---|---|---|
| (Republic of Ireland) Patsy Fagan | 1–2 | (England) Jimmy White | |
| (England) John Pulman | 1–2 | (England) Jimmy White | |
| (England) Pat Houlihan | 1–2 | (England) Jimmy White | |
| (Republic of Ireland) Patsy Fagan | 0–3 | (England) John Pulman | |
| (Republic of Ireland) Patsy Fagan | 1–2 | (England) Pat Houlihan | |
| (England) John Pulman | 1–2 | (England) Pat Houlihan | |

=== Group 3 ===
| Player 1 | Score | Player 2 | Date |
|---|---|---|---|
| (England) Willie Thorne | 2–1 | (England) Tony Knowles | |
| (England) Willie Thorne | 2–1 | (England) Joe Johnson | |
| (England) Tony Knowles | 3–0 | (England) Joe Johnson | |
| (England) Mike Hallett | 3–0 | (England) Joe Johnson | |
| (England) Willie Thorne | 1–2 | (England) Mike Hallett | |
| (England) Mike Hallett | 2–1 | (England) Tony Knowles | |

=== Group 4 ===
| Player 1 | Score | Player 2 | Date |
|---|---|---|---|
| (England) John Spencer | 3–0 | (England) Jim Meadowcroft | |
| (England) John Spencer | 2–1 | (England) Dave Martin | |
| (England) Jim Meadowcroft | 2–1 | (England) Dave Martin | |
| (England) John Spencer | 1–2 | (England) Ray Edmonds | |
| (England) Ray Edmonds | 2–1 | (England) Jim Meadowcroft | |
| (England) Ray Edmonds | 2–1 | (England) Dave Martin | |

Single frame play-off

| Player 1 | Score | Player 2 | Date |
|---|---|---|---|
| (England) David Taylor | 94–10 | (Wales) Doug Mountjoy | |
