= 1987 British Open =

1987 Dulux British Open
Tournament information
- Dates: 15 February – 1 March 1987
- Venue: Assembly Rooms
- City: Derby
- Country: England
- Organisation: WPBSA
- Format: Ranking event
- Total prize fund: £300,000
- Winner's share: £60,000
- Highest break: Neal Foulds (ENG) (140)

Final
- Champion: Jimmy White (ENG)
- Runner-up: Neal Foulds (ENG)
- Score: 13–9

The 1987 British Open (officially the 1987 Dulux British Open) was a professional ranking snooker tournament, that was held from 15 February to 1 March 1987 with television coverage on ITV and Channel 4 beginning on 20 February at the Assembly Rooms in Derby, England.

== Main draw ==
The Last 64 was played at Solihull in November 1986. The last 32 onwards was played at Derby.

Last 64; Best of 9 frames
(England) Steve Davis	5
(Canada) Marcel Gauvreau	0
(England) John Virgo	5
(Canada) Mario Morra	3
(South Africa) Silvino Francisco	5
(England) Brian Rowswell	0
(Wales) Cliff Wilson	5
(England) Geoff Foulds	3
(England) Neal Foulds	5
(England) David Roe	1
(New Zealand) Warren King	5
(England) John Parrott	1
(England) Willie Thorne	5
(England) Bob Harris	1
(England) Steve Duggan	5
(England) Steve Longworth	2
(Northern Ireland) Dennis Taylor	5
(Wales) Colin Roscoe	1
(Australia) Eddie Charlton	5
(England) Paul Medati	4
(Wales) Terry Griffiths	5
(Scotland) John Rea	2
(England) Tony Jones	5
(Scotland) Murdo MacLeod	4
(England) Tony Knowles	5
(England) Danny Fowler	4
(England) Dean Reynolds	5
(England) Nigel Gilbert	2
(Wales) Ray Reardon	5
(Northern Ireland) Joe O'Boye	4
(Northern Ireland) Tommy Murphy	5
(Canada) Jim Wych	1
(England) Jimmy White	5
(Wales) Tony Chappel	1
(England) Mike Hallett	5
(Canada) Gino Rigitano	1
(England) Rex Williams	5
(Australia) Robby Foldvari	4
(England) Steve James	5
(Australia) John Campbell	1
(England) Joe Johnson	5
(Malta) Tony Drago	0
(Republic of Ireland) Eugene Hughes	5
(England) Vic Harris	1
(England) John Spencer	5
(England) Tony Meo	1
(England) Dave Martin	5
(England) George Scott	3
(Canada) Kirk Stevens	5
(Canada) Bob Chaperon	4
(England) Barry West	5
(South Africa) Robbie Grace	2
(England) David Taylor	5
(Australia) Glen Wilkinson	4
(Northern Ireland) Jack McLaughlin	5
(Northern Ireland) Alex Higgins	4
(Wales) Doug Mountjoy	5
(England) Ken Owers	1
(South Africa) Peter Francisco	5
(Scotland) Eddie Sinclair	3
(England) Graham Cripsey	5
(Canada) Bill Werbeniuk	2
(Canada) Cliff Thorburn	5
(England) Mark Wildman	3

Last 32; Best of 9 frames
(England) Steve Davis	4
(England) John Virgo	5
(South Africa) Silvino Francisco	4
(Wales) Cliff Wilson	5
(England) Neal Foulds	5
(Australia) Warren King	4
(England) Willie Thorne	5
(England) Steve Duggan	2
(Northern Ireland) Dennis Taylor	5
(Australia) Eddie Charlton	1
(Wales) Terry Griffiths	5
(England) Tony Jones	3
(England) Tony Knowles	5
(England) Dean Reynolds	0
(Wales) Ray Reardon	4
(Northern Ireland) Tommy Murphy	5
(England) Jimmy White	5
(England) Mike Hallett	2
(England) Rex Williams	5
(England) Steve James	2
(England) Joe Johnson	5
(Republic of Ireland) Eugene Hughes	3
(England) John Spencer	5
(England) Dave Martin	2
(Canada) Kirk Stevens	5
(England) Barry West	4
(England) David Taylor	5
(Northern Ireland) Jack McLaughlin	2
(Wales) Doug Mountjoy	5
(South Africa) Peter Francisco	3
(England) Graham Cripsey	2
(Canada) Cliff Thorburn	5

Last 16; Best of 9 frames
(England) John Virgo	5
(Wales) Cliff Wilson	2
(England) Neal Foulds	5
(England) Willie Thorne	2
(Northern Ireland) Dennis Taylor	5
(Wales) Terry Griffiths	4
(England) Tony Knowles	5
(Northern Ireland) Tommy Murphy	3
(England) Jimmy White	5
(England) Rex Williams	0
(England) Joe Johnson	3
(England) John Spencer	5
(Canada) Kirk Stevens	2
(England) David Taylor	5
(Wales) Doug Mountjoy	4
(Canada) Cliff Thorburn	5

Quarter-finals; Best of 9 frames
(England) John Virgo	3
(England) Neal Foulds	5
(Northern Ireland) Dennis Taylor	4
(England) Tony Knowles	5
(England) Jimmy White	5
(England) John Spencer	3
(England) David Taylor	3
(Canada) Cliff Thorburn	5

Semi-finals; Best of 17 frames
(England) Neal Foulds	9
(England) Tony Knowles	2
(England) Jimmy White	9
(Canada) Cliff Thorburn	5

Final; Best of 25 frames
(England) Neal Foulds	9
(England) Jimmy White	13

== Final ==
Final: Best of 25 frames. Referee: John Williams; Assembly Rooms, Derby, England. 28 February and 1 March 1987.
Jimmy White; England	13–9	Neal Foulds; England
Afternoon: 18–72 (58), 0–129 (105), 57–64 (White 55, Foulds 51), 17–52 (52), 89–12, 80–0, 67–24; Evening: 5–90, 73–16, 21–81, 73–6, 20–75, 80–33 (71), 4–87, 65–53 (56); Afternoon: 87–23 (56), 61–18, 85–44 (57), 73–15, 69–35, 4–79 (58), 76–24 (61)
71	Highest break	105
0	Century breaks	1
3	50+ breaks	8
