= Rex Williams =

English billiards and snooker player (born 1933)

Rex Williams BEM
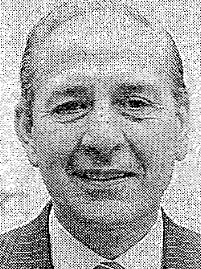
- Williams in 1988

Personal information
- Born: 20 July 1933 (age 93) Halesowen, England

Sport
- Country: England
- Sport: Snooker
- Professional: 1951–1995
- Highest ranking: 6 (1976/77)
- Best ranking finish: Runner-up (×1)

Desmond Rex Williams (born 20 July 1933) is an English retired professional billiards and snooker player. He was the second player to make an official maximum break in snooker, achieving this in an exhibition match in December 1965. Williams won the World Professional Billiards Championship from Clark McConachy in 1968, the first time that the title had been contested since 1951. Williams retained the title in several challenge matches in the 1970s and, after losing it to Fred Davis in 1980, regained it from 1982 to 1983.

He played a leading role in the re-establishment of the World Snooker Championship on a challenge basis in 1964, and lost twice to John Pulman, once in a single match and once in a series of matches played in South Africa. When the Championship reverted to being a knockout from 1969, he reached the semi-finals three times. In 1968 he initiated the revival of the Professional Billiards Players Association (known as the World Professional Billiards and Snooker Association from 1970). He chaired the association, barring a few weeks in 1983, until 1987, and again from 1997 to 1999.

Williams was a successful junior player in both snooker and billiards, and became a professional in 1951 at the age of 18. At the 1986 Grand Prix, aged 53, he became the oldest player to reach a ranking tournament final. He lost the match 6–10 to Jimmy White after leading 6–4. He retired from competitive snooker in 1995, having achieved his highest ranking, 6th, in 1976/77.

== Career ==
=== Junior career ===
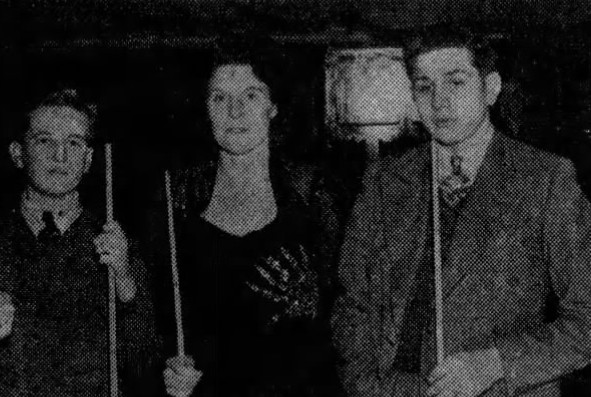
Terence Shairp, Joyce Gardner (centre) and Williams (right) at the 1949 Boys Snooker Championship in Scunthorpe

Williams was born in Halesowen on 20 July 1933. He started playing on a full-size billiard table at the age of 13 on a table installed at his father's printing works, and was coached by Kingsley Kennerley. He won the Midlands Boys Titles in both billiards and snooker. In 1948 he won the British Boys' (under-16) Championships at both snooker and billiards, and in 1950 he was the National Under-19 Billiards champion. He played an exhibition match against Joe Davis in 1949, winning the one frame 85–51 after receiving 21 start. In 1951, at 17 years old, he became the youngest winner of the English Amateur Snooker Championship (until Jimmy White in 1979), beating the 1939 champion Percy Bendon 6–1 in the final. He also won the 1951 National Under-19 Championships at both snooker and billiards.

=== Early professional career ===
Williams turned professional in 1951 at the age of 18, and entered the 1952 World Professional Match-play Championship. He met Alec Brown in the first round in a match over 61 frames played from 17 to 22 December 1951 at Darlaston, Staffordshire. Brown won comfortably, taking a winning 33–17 lead after the fifth day and eventually winning 39–22. Williams made his debut at Leicester Square Hall in early 1952, playing John Pulman in an challenge match on level terms. Pulman won the six-day match 42–31. Williams then beat John Barrie 40–33 in another challenge match, receiving 10 points each frame in the handicapped match.

In May and early June 1952, Williams played in the qualifying competition for the 1952/1953 News of the World Snooker Tournament. In his first match he played 66-year-old Willie Smith and won 22–15. The qualifying was won by Jackie Rea who advanced to the main event. Williams met Kingsley Kennerley in the first qualifying round for the World Championship. Kennerley had already beaten him 23–14 in the News of the World qualifying and beat him again, this time 25–12. Albert Brown was ill for two of his matches in the News of the World Tournament and Williams played Fred Davis in a three-day exhibition match, in place of the planned second contest. Williams received a 14-point start but Fred Davis won the match 23–14. In March 1953, Williams played Joe Davis in an exhibition match. Williams received a 21-point handicap but Joe Davis won 43–30, scoring 4 centuries on the final day.

Williams met Harry Stokes in the 31-frame qualifying round of the World Championship in early October 1953 and led 3–2 after the first session. Williams was then ill and the match was rearranged for a later date. The match was, however, later cancelled and Stokes advanced to the next round.

=== 1960s revival of snooker ===
In 1964, the Conayes £200 Professional Tournament was staged at the Rex Williams Snooker Centre in Blackheath, being the first commercially sponsored professional snooker event since 1960. Williams was one of the four competitors, along with Fred Davis, John Pulman and Jackie Rea. Pulman won the event. Williams was instrumental in the revival of the World Snooker Championship in 1964, obtaining sanction for the competition after taking the Billiards Association and Control Council (BA&CC) chairman Harold Phillips out to lunch. The championship was staged on a challenge basis, with the first match being scheduled between Pulman, the winner of the 1957 World Professional Match-play Championship, and Fred Davis. Pulman beat Davis 19–16.

Later in 1964, Williams challenged Pulman for the title. The match was over 73 frames, played over 6 days from 12 to 17 October at Burroughes Hall. Williams led 8–4 at the end of the first day but Pulman won 11 of the 12 frames on the second day to lead 15–9. Pulman extended his lead to 31–17 after four days and won the match on the fifth day, taking a 37–23 winning lead. Pulman made a break of 109 in frame 57. The remaining 13 "dead" frames were played on the final day with Pulman finishing 40–33 ahead. Williams and Pulman met again in late 1965 in a series of short matches in South Africa, but Williams was unsuccessful again, losing 25 matches to 22. In one of these matches in East London in the Eastern Cape, Williams made a break of 142, breaking the World Championship record of 136 set by Joe Davis in 1946. This stood as the world championship record break until 1981, when Doug Mountjoy compiled a 145. In December 1965, during an exhibition match in Cape Town against Mannie Francisco, Williams followed Joe Davis as the second man to make a recognised 147 break.

In 1967, Williams and Fred Davis played a 51 match series that was billed as the World Open Matchplay Snooker Challenge, even though no other entries were solicited. The following year, Williams convened a meeting of players at his house that led to the revival of the Professional Billiard Players Association (PBPA), with Williams as chairman.

=== World professional billiards championship and the WPBSA ===
Williams won the World Professional Billiards Championship seven times from 1968 to 1983, including a reign as champion from 1968 to 1980. In 1968, Williams was on a trip to Australia, and decided to travel to Auckland in New Zealand to play the reigning champion Clark McConachy for the billiards title, which had not been contested since McConachy's 1951 win. By this time, McConachy was 73, and his play was affected by his Parkinson's disease. Williams won the title 5,499–5,234, and made the match's highest break, 293.

Leslie Driffield was nominated as the BA&CC challenger to Williams for the professional Billiards Championship. Williams declined to play Driffield within the five months time limit that the BA&CC had set, which expired on 7 July 1970, and forfeited the title, which was then contested between Driffield and Jack Karnehm in June 1971. On 1 October 1970, the PBPA disaffiliated from the BA&CC. The PBPA changed its name to the World Professional Billiards and Snooker Association on 12 December 1970, and declared itself the governing body for the professional game, recognising Williams as champion. Driffield and Karnehm were, at first, the only two professionals to recognise the BA&CC as continuing to have authority over the game. During the 1970s, Williams made four successful defences of his title, against Bernard Bennett in 1971, Karnehm in 1973, and Eddie Charlton in 1974 and 1976. He also won the 1979 UK Championship, which was the first time the event had been held since Fred Davis won in 1951. Williams beat Karnehm in the semi-final and John Barrie 2,952–2,116 in the final. He reached the 1980 and 1981 UK finals, both against Karnehm, losing 2,423–2,518 in 1980 and winning 1,592–1,112 in 1981.

Williams lost the world title to Fred Davis in May 1980. Davis made a break of 583, the highest in the world championship for 46 years, in beating Williams 5,978–4,452. The championship then reverted to a knockout format, and was held in November 1980, with Williams losing to Mark Wildman in the semi-final. At the next staging, in 1982, Williams regained the title by beating Wildman 3,000–1,785 in the final; he retained it in 1983 with a 1,500–605 victory over Davis in the final. Unhappy at not being allowed to use a practice table near another match at the 1983 tournament, Williams had left the venue and returned late for his semi-final against Ray Edmonds, causing the match to start 48 minutes late. There were no rules in place for penalties for late arrivals, but following complaints to the WPBSA, Williams was fined £500 by the association, and resigned as chairman, but remained on the board. Three weeks later, he accepted the board's invitation to become chairman again. He continued as chairman until 1987, and took the role again from 1997 to 1999. In 2001, he was expelled from the Association following alleged fiduciary irregularities and asked to repay legal costs of £28,268, but was reinstated as a full member the following year. The Association apologised for its actions "unequivocally".

=== Later professional career ===
Williams reached the semi-final of the World Snooker Championship three times, losing to John Spencer in 1969, in 1972 to Alex Higgins 30–31 (having been four frames ahead with five left to play) and, in 1974, 7–15 to Graham Miles. He never won a World Championship match at the Crucible Theatre after it became the World Snooker Championship's venue in 1977, despite playing at the venue on eight occasions (a record he shares with Cliff Wilson). He recovered from 8–2 down to win 9–8 against Terry Griffiths in the first round of the 1978 UK Championship, in the future World Champion Griffiths' first match as a professional. Williams was the 1973 Pot Black runner-up, losing 33–99 to Charlton in the one-frame final.

In the 1985–86 snooker season, Williams reached the semi-finals of the 1986 Classic and the last sixteen of two other ranking events, and after some years outside the elite top 16 ranked players, was ranked 16th for 1986/1987. This meant that he earnt a place in the Masters for the first time since 1977. He was beaten 1–5 by Cliff Thorburn in the first round of the 1987 event. During the 1986–87 snooker season, Williams became the oldest player to reach a world-ranking final when, aged 53, he lost 6–10 to Jimmy White at the 1986 Grand Prix, after having led 6–4. His run to the Grand Prix final included 5–1 wins over both Higgins and Steve Davis, and a 9–8 semi-final defeat of Neal Foulds. He finished the season ranked 12th.

His last tournament as a professional snooker player was the 1995 World Championship, where he defeated Steve Day and Chris O'Sullivan, before losing in the fourth qualifying round 3–10 to Nick Walker. His highest world ranking was 6th, in 1976/1977.

Williams founded a cue-making company, Power Glide Cues, and in 1975 established Rex Williams Leisure, a snooker and pool table manufacturing and hire business. Stephen Hendry bought a Rex Williams signature cue for £40 when he was aged 13, and used it until it was broken in 2003, including during his seven world snooker championship wins. Williams was a commentator for snooker television broadcasts for the BBC from 1978 to 1984, and after that for ITV. His book Snooker : How to become a Champion was published in 1975, and republished with some amendments as How to play Snooker in 1982 and 1988, and as Snooker in 1984.

Williams was awarded the British Empire Medal in the 2020 Birthday Honours for services to snooker and billiards.

== Performance and rankings timeline ==
=== Post-war ===
Tournament	1951/ 52	1952/ 53	1953/ 54	1954/ 55	1955/ 56	1956/ 57	1957/ 58	1958/ 59	1959/ 60	1963/ 64	Oct 1964	Sep–Dec 1965
World Professional Match-play Championship	1R	LQ	LQ	QF	SF	SF	Tournament Not Held					
News of the World Snooker Tournament	A	LQ	8	A	6	4	4	A	A	Not Held		
Conayes Professional Tournament	Tournament Not Held									3	Not Held	
World Championship (Note: Tournaments between 1964 and 1968 were challenge matches)	A	Tournament Not Held								A	F	F

=== Modern era ===
Tournament	1968/ 69	1969/ 70	1970/ 71	1971/ 72	1972/ 73	1973/ 74	1974/ 75	1975/ 76	1976/ 77	1977/ 78	1978/ 79	1979/ 80	1980/ 81	1981/ 82	1982/ 83	1983/ 84	1984/ 85	1985/ 86	1986/ 87	1987/ 88	1988/ 89	1989/ 90	1990/ 91	1991/ 92	1992/ 93	1993/ 94	1994/ 95
Ranking	No ranking system								6	11	17	21	22	19	33	30	31	27	16	12	18	32	37	48	69	123	192
Ranking tournaments
Dubai Classic (Note: The event was also called the Dubai Masters (1988/1989))	Tournament Not Held																				NR	1R	QF	LQ	LQ	LQ	A
Grand Prix (Note: The event was also called the Professional Players Tournament (1982/93–1983/1984))	Tournament Not Held														2R	2R	2R	2R	F	1R	QF	1R	1R	LQ	LQ	LQ	A
UK Championship	Tournament Not Held									Non-Ranking Event							2R	3R	1R	1R	2R	2R	1R	1R	LQ	LQ	A
European Open	Tournament Not Held																				2R	2R	1R	1R	LQ	LQ	A
Welsh Open	Tournament Not Held																							LQ	LQ	LQ	A
International Open (Note: The event was also called the Matchroom Trophy (1985/1986))	Tournament Not Held													NR	1R	LQ	2R	1R	3R	1R	3R	1R	Not Held		LQ	LQ	A
Thailand Open (Note: The event was also called the Thailand Masters (1983/1984–1986/1987) and the Asian Open (1989/1990–1992/1993))	Tournament Not Held															Non-Ranking Event				Not Held		1R	1R	LQ	LQ	LQ	A
British Open (Note: The event was also called the British Gold Cup (1979/1980), Yamaha Organs Trophy (1980/1981) and International Masters (1981/1982–1983/1984))	Tournament Not Held											Non-Ranking Event					1R	3R	3R	QF	1R	2R	1R	1R	LQ	LQ	A
World Championship	Non-Ranking Event					SF	QF	1R	1R	LQ	LQ	LQ	LQ	1R	1R	1R	1R	1R	1R	1R	LQ	LQ	LQ	LQ	LQ	LQ	LQ
Non-ranking tournaments
The Masters	Tournament Not Held						SF	QF	QF	A	A	A	A	A	A	A	A	A	1R	1R	A	A	A	A	A	A	A
Irish Masters (Note: The event was also called the Benson & Hedges Ireland Tournament (1974/1975–1976/1977))	Tournament Not Held						A	A	A	A	A	A	A	A	A	A	A	A	A	1R	A	A	A	A	A	A	A
Pontins Professional	Tournament Not Held					SF	SF	QF	RR	RR	A	A	A	A	A	A	A	A	A	A	A	A	A	A	A	A	A
Former ranking tournaments
Canadian Masters (Note: The event was also called the Canadian Open (1978/1979–1980/1981))	Tournament Not Held						Non-Ranking							Tournament Not Held				Non-Ranking			LQ	Tournament Not Held					
Hong Kong Open	Tournament Not Held																					LQ	Tournament Not Held				
Classic	Tournament Not Held											Non-Ranking Event				2R	2R	SF	2R	1R	1R	2R	2R	LQ	Not Held		
Strachan Open	Tournament Not Held																							LQ	Not Held		
Former non-ranking tournaments
Park Drive 2000 (Spring)	Not Held		RR	A	Tournament Not Held																						
Park Drive 2000 (Autumn)	Not Held			RR	A	Tournament Not Held																					
World Championship	SF	QF	A	SF	QF	Ranking Event																					
World Masters	Tournament Not Held						RR	Tournament Not Held																			
Norwich Union Open	Tournament Not Held					A	QF	Tournament Not Held																			
Watney Open	Tournament Not Held						QF	Tournament Not Held																			
World Matchplay Championship	Tournament Not Held								1R	Tournament Not Held																	
Canadian Masters (Note: The event was also called the Canadian Open (1974/1975–1980/1981))	Tournament Not Held						A	A	A	A	2R	A	A	Tournament Not Held				A	A	A	R	Tournament Not Held					
Holsten Lager International	Tournament Not Held										SF	Tournament Not Held															
Limosin International	Tournament Not Held											QF	Tournament Not Held														
International Open (Note: The event was also called the Goya Matchroom Trophy (1985/1986))	Tournament Not Held													2R	Ranking Event								Not Held		Ranking Event		
Bass & Golden Leisure Classic	Tournament Not Held													W	Tournament Not Held												
UK Championship	Tournament Not Held									2R	2R	A	QF	LQ	1R	1R	Ranking Event										
British Open (Note: The event was also called the British Gold Cup (1979/1980), Yamaha Organs Trophy (1980/1981) and International Masters (1981/1982–1983/1984))	Tournament Not Held											LQ	A	LQ	LQ	LQ	Ranking Event										
Kent Cup	Tournament Not Held																		QF	A	A	A	A	NH	A	Not Held	
English Professional Championship	Tournament Not Held												A	Not Held			2R	2R	QF	2R	1R	Tournament Not Held					
World Seniors Championship	Tournament Not Held																								1R	Not Held	

Performance Table Legend
LQ	lost in the qualifying draw	#R	lost in the early rounds of the tournament (WR = Wildcard round, RR = Round robin)	QF	lost in the quarter-finals
SF	lost in the semi-finals	F	lost in the final	W	won the tournament
DNQ	did not qualify for the tournament	A	did not participate in the tournament	WD	withdrew from the tournament

NH / Not Held	means an event was not held.
NR / Non-Ranking Event	means an event is/was no longer a ranking event.
R / Ranking Event	means an event is/was a ranking event.

== Career titles ==
=== Junior snooker and billiards ===
Outcome	No.	Date	Championship	Opponent in the final	Score	Ref.
Winner	1	1948	British Boys Billiards Championship	Jack Carney (WAL)	400–349	
Winner	1	1948	British Boys Snooker Championship	Gordon Hobbs (ENG)	4–1	
Winner	2	1949	British Boys Billiards Championship	Michael Leyden (SCO)	400–280	
Winner	1	1950	British Junior Billiards Championship	Jack Carney (WAL)	747–322	
Winner	2	1951	British Junior Billiards Championship	Jack Carney (WAL)	751–270	
Winner	1	1951	British Junior Snooker Championship	Cliff Wilson (WAL)	3–2	

=== Amateur snooker ===
Outcome	No.	Date	Championship	Opponent in the final	Score	Ref.
Winner	1	1951	English Amateur Championship	Percy Bendon (ENG)	6–1	

=== Professional snooker ===
Outcome	No.	Date	Championship	Opponent in the final	Score	Ref.
Winner	1	1967	World Open Snooker Championship	Fred Davis (ENG)	26–23 (Note: Played as best of 51 matches of seven frames each)	
Runner-up	1	1968	World Open Matchplay Championship	Eddie Charlton (AUS)	30–43	
Runner-up	2	1973	Pot Black	Eddie Charlton (AUS)	0–1	
Winner	2	1982	Bass and Golden Leisure Classic	Ray Edmonds (ENG)	4–1	

=== Professional billiards ===
Outcome	No.	Date	Championship	Opponent in the final	Score	Ref.
Winner	1 (Note: Challenge Match)	August 1968	World Professional Championship of English Billiards	Clark McConachy (NZL)	5,499–5,234	
Winner	2	May 1971	World Professional Championship of English Billiards	Bernard Bennett (ENG)	9,250–4,058	
Winner	3	September 1973	World Professional Championship of English Billiards	Jack Karnehm (ENG)	8,360–4,336	
Winner	4	September 1974	World Professional Championship of English Billiards	Eddie Charlton (AUS)	7,017–4,916	
Winner	5	July 1976	World Professional Championship of English Billiards	Eddie Charlton (AUS)	9,105–5,149	
Winner	1	February 1979	UK Championship of Professional Billiards	John Barrie (ENG)	2,952–2,116	
Runner-up	1	February 1980	UK Championship of Professional Billiards	Jack Karnehm (ENG)	2,423–2,518	
Runner-up	2	May 1980	World Professional Championship of English Billiards	Fred Davis (ENG)	4,452–5,978	
Winner	2	February 1981	UK Championship of Professional Billiards	Jack Karnehm (ENG)	1,592–1,112	
Winner	6	March 1982	World Professional Championship of English Billiards	Mark Wildman (ENG)	3,000–1,785	
Winner	7	March 1983	World Professional Championship of English Billiards	Fred Davis (ENG)	1,500–605	

== Books ==
Year	Title	Author(s)	Publisher	ISBN
1975	Snooker : How to become a Champion	Rex Williams (with diagrams by Peter F. Chaplin and photographs by M. Athar Chaudhry)	William Luscombe	0860020096 / 086002136X
1982	How to Play Snooker	Rex Williams (with diagrams by Peter F. Chaplin and photographs by M. Athar Chaudhry)	Hamlyn	0600350134
1984	Snooker	Rex Williams (with diagrams by Peter F. Chaplin and photographs by M. Athar Chaudhry)	Hamlyn	0600347664
1988	How to Play Snooker	Rex Williams (with diagrams by Peter F. Chaplin and photographs by M. Athar Chaudhry)	Treasure Press	1860513031
