= 1980 UK Championship =

1980 Coral UK Championship
Tournament information
- Dates: 16–29 November 1980
- Venue: Preston Guild Hall
- City: Preston
- Country: England
- Organisation: WPBSA
- Format: Non-ranking event
- Winner's share: £6,000
- Highest break: (Northern Ireland) Alex Higgins (134)

Final
- Champion: (England) Steve Davis
- Runner-up: (Northern Ireland) Alex Higgins
- Score: 16–6

The 1980 UK Championship (officially the 1980 Coral UK Championship) was a professional non-ranking snooker tournament that took place at the Guild Hall in Preston, England, between 16 and 29 November 1980. This was the fourth edition of the UK Championship and the third staging of the competition in Preston. The event was sponsored by Coral for the third consecutive year. The televised stages were shown on the BBC from 22 to 29 November – the BBC's television coverage had been extended to eight days after the success of other competitions such as the World Championship. They covered from the quarter-finals which matches were played on a one table stage of two sessions a day and would remain that way until it became a ranking event in 1984.

Steve Davis defeated Alex Higgins 16–6 in the final to win his first major title, after making his first major quarter-final in the previous year's championship. Davis whitewashed Terry Griffiths 9–0 in the semi-finals on his way to the final. The highest break of the tournament was a 134 made by Higgins.

== Prize fund ==
- Winner: £6,000
- Runner-up: £3,000
- Semi-final: £1,500
- Quarter-final: £1,000
- Last 16: £500
- Last 24: £250

== Main draw ==
Last 24; Best of 17 frames
(England) Tony Meo	9
(England) Pat Houlihan	1
(England) Steve Davis	9
(England) Mike Hallett	1
(Scotland) Eddie Sinclair	9
(England) Graham Miles	5
(Republic of Ireland) Patsy Fagan	9
(England) Joe Johnson	4
(England) Willie Thorne	9
(England) Jim Meadowcroft	1
(England) Mark Wildman	9
(England) John Spencer	7
(Wales) Roy Andrewartha	9
(England) John Pulman	6
(England) Rex Williams	9
(Wales) Doug Mountjoy	8

Last 16; Best of 17 frames
(England) John Virgo	1
(England) Tony Meo	9
(Canada) Bill Werbeniuk	3
(England) Steve Davis	9
(Northern Ireland) Dennis Taylor	9
(Scotland) Eddie Sinclair	6
(Wales) Terry Griffiths	9
(Republic of Ireland) Patsy Fagan	8
(Northern Ireland) Alex Higgins	9
(England) Willie Thorne	7
(England) Fred Davis	9
(England) Mark Wildman	6
(Wales) Ray Reardon	9
(Wales) Roy Andrewartha	3
(England) David Taylor	7
(England) Rex Williams	9

Quarter-finals; Best of 17 frames
(England) Tony Meo	5
(England) Steve Davis	9
(Northern Ireland) Dennis Taylor	2
(Wales) Terry Griffiths	9
(Northern Ireland) Alex Higgins	9
(England) Fred Davis	6
(Wales) Ray Reardon	9
(England) Rex Williams	4

Semi-finals; Best of 17 frames
(England) Steve Davis	9
(Wales) Terry Griffiths	0
(Northern Ireland) Alex Higgins	9
(Wales) Ray Reardon	7

Final; Best of 31 frames
(England) Steve Davis	16
(Northern Ireland) Alex Higgins	6

== Final ==
Final: Best of 31 frames. Referee: Jim Thorpe (first session), John Williams (other sessions); The Guild Hall, Preston, England, 28 and 29 November 1980.
Steve Davis; England	16–6	Alex Higgins; Northern Ireland
First session: 93–29 (69), 107–16, 27–79 (58), 79–16 (60), 26–69, 114–0 (114), 96–29 (95), 65–41, 68–29, 81–24, 28–74; Second session: 60–66, 47–55, 64–10 (64), 81–38; Third session: 74–21 (55), 105–12 (75), 65–32, 62–70 (Davis 61, Higgins 66), 86–34 (75), 97–20, 64–46
114	Highest break	66
1	Century breaks	0
9	50+ breaks	2

== Qualifying ==
Preliminary round Best of 17 frames

(England) Kingsley Kennerley W/O Jackie Rea (Northern Ireland)

(England) Sid Hood 9–3 Chris Ross (Scotland)

(England) Mike Hallett 9–8 Bernard Bennett (England)

Last 32 Best of 17 frames

(England) Tony Meo 9–5 Sid Hood (England)

(England) Mike Hallett 9–8 Ray Edmonds (England)

(Scotland) Eddie Sinclair 9–1 Kingsley Kennerley (England)

(England) Joe Johnson 9–6 John Dunning (England)

(England) Jim Meadowcroft 9–1 David Greaves (England)

(England) Mark Wildman 9–8 Cliff Wilson (Wales)

(Wales) Roy Andrewartha 9–8 Tony Knowles (England)

(England) Rex Williams 9–1 John Barrie (England)

== Century breaks ==
- 134, 109 – Alex Higgins
- 118 – Tony Meo
- 118 – Willie Thorne
- 114 – Steve Davis
- 102 – Doug Mountjoy
- 102 – Ray Reardon
