= 1970 World Snooker Championship =

Professional snooker tournament, held 1969–70

Tournament information
- Dates: 15 October 1969 – 11 April 1970
- Final venue: Victoria Hall
- Final city: London
- Country: England
- Organisation: Billiards Association and Control Council
- Total prize fund: Unknown
- Winner's share: £1,225
- Highest break: Ray Reardon (WAL) (118)

Final
- Champion: Ray Reardon (WAL)
- Runner-up: John Pulman (ENG)
- Score: 37–33

The 1970 World Snooker Championship was a professional snooker tournament that took place from 15 October 1969 to 11 April 1970, as an edition of the World Snooker Championship. The final was held at Victoria Hall in London from 6 to 11 April 1970. The championship was sponsored by Player's No.6 for the second and last time.

There were nine participants in the tournament, one more than in the previous year. The defending champion was John Spencer, who had defeated Gary Owen 37–24 in the final of the 1969 World Snooker Championship. Spencer was eliminated in the semi-finals of the 1970 event with a 33–37 loss to Ray Reardon, who claimed the title with a 37–33 final victory over John Pulman. Reardon also made the highest break of the tournament, a 118, and received total prize money of £1,225. He held the world title for only seven months, until the next championship in Australia which concluded in November 1970. Reardon eventually won a total of six world titles, the last of these in 1978.

== Background ==
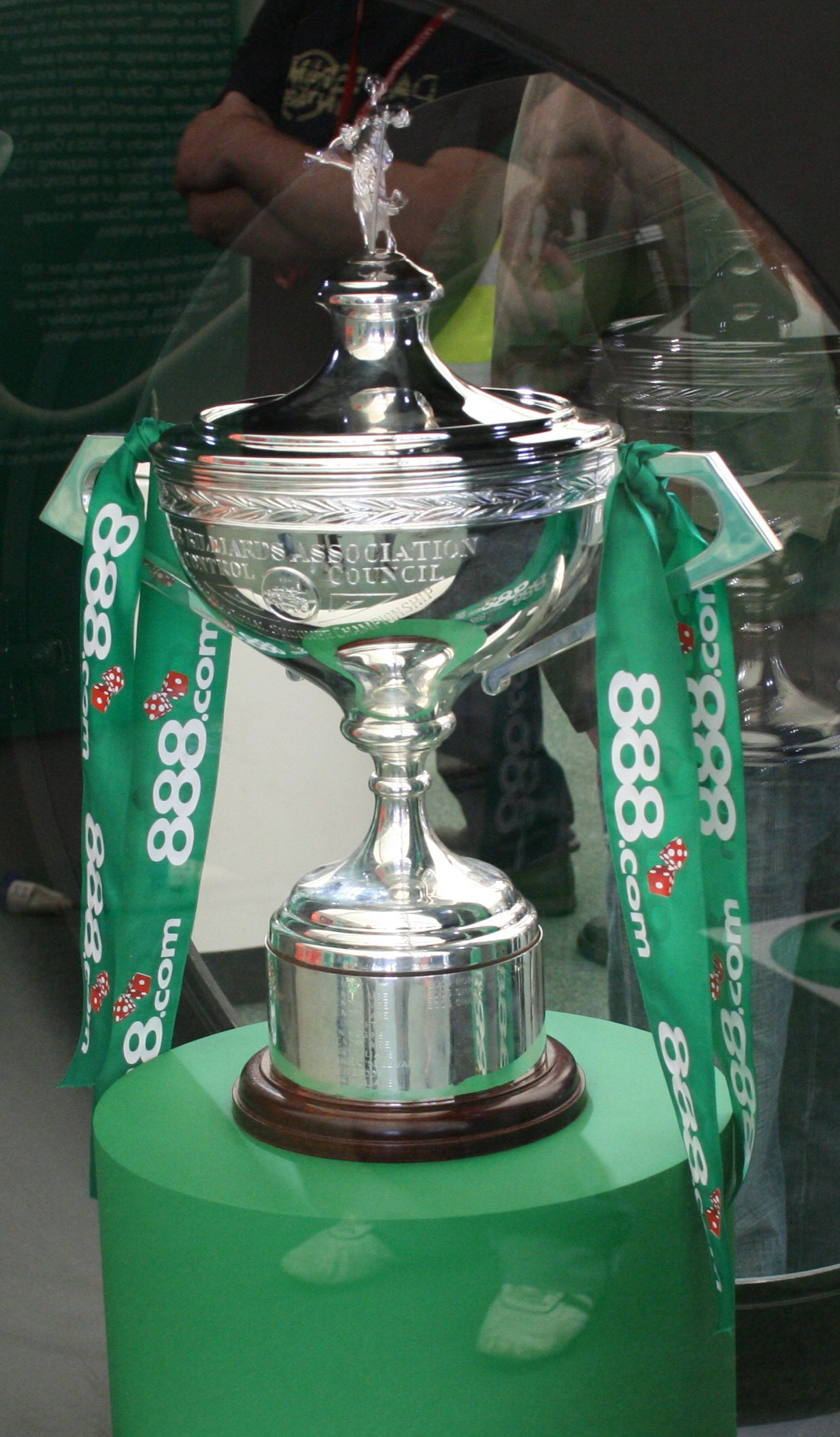
The World Snooker Championship trophy was first used in 1927.

The World Snooker Championship is a professional tournament and the official world championship of the game of snooker. The sport was developed in the late 19th century by British Army soldiers stationed in India. Professional English billiards player and billiard hall manager Joe Davis noticed the increasing popularity of snooker compared to billiards in the 1920s, and with Birmingham-based billiards equipment manager Bill Camkin, persuaded the Billiards Association and Control Council (BACC) to recognise an official professional snooker championship in the 1926–27 season. The annual competition was not titled the World Championship until 1935, but the 1927 tournament is now referred to as the first World Snooker Championship.

In 1952, the, following a dispute between the Professional Billiards Players' Association (PBPA) and the BACC about the distribution of income from the world championship, the PBPA members established an alternative competition known as the World Professional Match-play Championship, the editions of which are now recognised as world championships, whilst only Horace Lindrum and Clark McConachy entered for the BACC's 1952 World Snooker Championship. The World Professional Match-play Championship continued until 1957, after which there were no world championship matches until it was revived on a challenge basis in 1964. John Pulman retained the title in several challenges from 1964 to 1968. Tobacco brand John Player sponsored his 1968 match against Eddie Charlton. The good attendances for the championship match led to John Player deciding to sponsor the 1969 World Snooker Championship as a knock-out format tournament, using their "Players No. 6" brand. The 1969 championship is regarded as the first of the modern snooker era, and was won by John Spencer, who defeated Gary Owen 37–24 in the final.

The 1970 Championship was sponsored by tobacco company John Player, using their Player's No.6 brand, the second and last time that they were the world championship sponsors. The tournament was played between 15 October 1969 and 11 April 1970. The winner of the event received cumulative prize money of £1,225. The eight players who participated in the 1969 championship all entered again, joined by David Taylor, who had turned professional after winning the 1968 World Amateur Snooker Championship.

=== Prize fund ===
Prize money was awarded as follows:

- Quarter-final losers £125; quarter-final winners £175
- Semi-final losers £250; semi-final winners £300
- Runner-up £500
- Winner £750

== Tournament summary ==
There was one first round match, which was played as the best of 21 frames between Taylor and Bernard Bennett at the Yew Tree Labour Club, West Bromwich, from 15 to 17 October 1969. Bennett won the first two frames, and the players were level at 3–3 before the first day finished with Bennett 4–3 up. He added the eighth frame, with Taylor then taking four consecutive frames. After Bennett won the 13th frame, Taylor made a break of 52 and led 8–6. Taylor ensured qualification for the next round by securing a winning margin at 11–8, with the score 12–9 after dead frames.

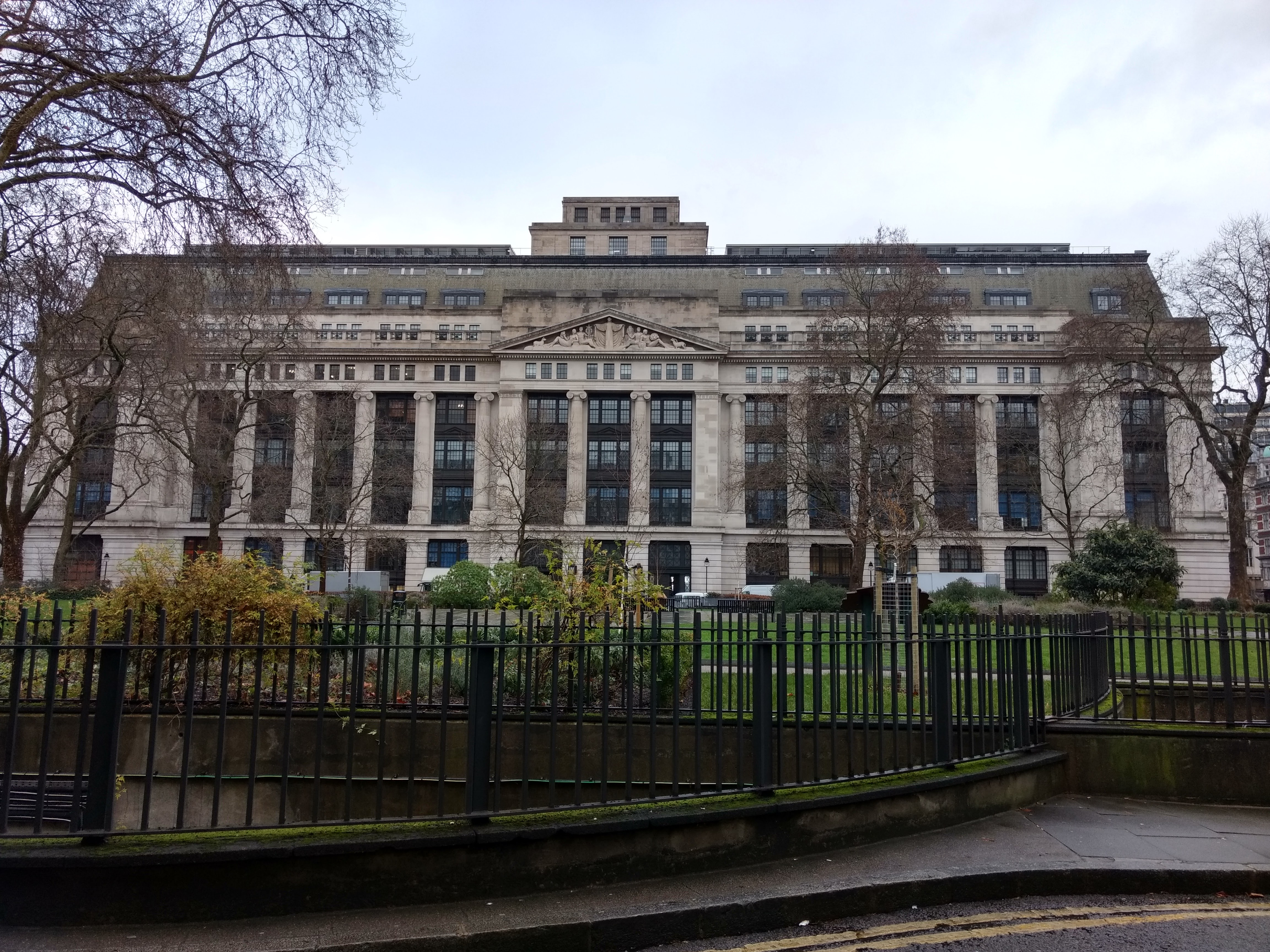
Victoria House in London was the venue for the final

The quarter-finals were played as the best of 61 frames. Owen met Williams at West Bromwich Community Centre from 1 to 6 December, and won all six frames in their first session. He won the seventh frame too, before Williams registered his first frame win. With Williams missing many attempts to pot balls, Owen took a winning lead at 31–11, and finished 46–15 ahead. Spencer played Jackie Rea at the Co-Op Hall, Bolton, from 8 to 12 December, and won 31–15. Reardon and Fred Davis contested their semi-final from 15 to 19 December at Longport W.M.C., Bolton, with Reardon prevailing 31–26. The last quarter-final, between Pulman and Taylor, was held from 12 to 16 January 1970, at Grimsby and Cleethorpes Transport Recreation Club. After the first two days of play, the pair were tied at 12 frames each, before Pulman went on to win 31–20, and 39–22 after dead frames.

The semi-finals were both contested over 73 frames. Spencer and Reardon played their semi-final from 16 to 21 February at the Co-Op Hall, Bolton. In his 1982 autobiography, Reardon recalled that the pockets of the billiard table were "far too tight for a championship" and that "You could not pot the black off the spot at speed with much confidence. The ball was drifting and skidding everywhere and side was uncontrollable." Reardon built an 8–5 lead on the first day, and led 13–6 after day two. Writing for Billiards and Snooker magazine, Norman Haseldine thought that Reardon started to manage the "peculiar running" of the balls on the table better than Spencer did, although "both players were guilty of innumerable misses ... and the match never attained the high standard expected". Reardon went on to defeat Spencer 37–33. The second semi-final took place at Priory Social Club, Middlesbrough from 23 to 28 February, between Pulman and Owen. Pulman led 9–3 after the first day, and extended this to 19–5 on the next day, then to 27–9 after day three. He won 37–13, and the match finished 48–25 after dead frames.

The final was held at the Victoria Hall in Bloomsbury Square, London, from 6 to 11 April, as the best of 73 frames. Reardon led 4–2 after the first session, and 8–4 after the second. On the next day, Reardon won four of the six afternoon session frames, and Pulman took four of the six evening frames, including the last three of the session, leaving Reardon 14–10 ahead. Reardon later extended his lead to 27–14, but Pulman narrowed the deficit to a single frame at 33–34. Reardon eventually won 37–33. Reardon received prize money of £1,125 (£750 for winning the final, £300 for winning the semi-final and £175 for winning the quarter-final) and Pulman took £975 (£500 as runner up, and the same amounts as Reardon for the semi-final and quarter-finals). Pulman said after the match that Reardon had deserved to win, and acclaimed Reardon's long potting. Pulman also stated that he felt that his own consistency in matches had been diminished due to a lack of match practice, leading to lapses in concentration. Reardon later wrote that "nothing will ever surpass the wonder of winning the world crown for the first time", and that the win made him financially secure for the first time since becoming a professional player: "I knew that the gamble had succeeded, that I could settle my debts and that the lean years were over. They had been well worthwhile."

Reardon held the title for only seven months until the next championship in Australia during November 1970. He went on to win a total of six world championships, the last of them in 1978.

== Main draw ==
The draw and results for the tournament are shown below. Match winners are denoted in bold. (Note: Some sources give the score in the semi-final as Pulman 37–12 Owen.)

First round (Best of 21 frames)
Player	Score	Player
**David Taylor (ENG)**	**11**–8	Bernard Bennett (ENG)

**Quarter-finals**; Best of 61 frames
**John Spencer (ENG)**	**31**
Jackie Rea (NIR)	15
**Ray Reardon (WAL)**	**31**
Fred Davis (ENG)	26
**Gary Owen (WAL)**	**31**
Rex Williams (ENG)	11
**John Pulman (ENG)**	**31**
David Taylor (ENG)	20

**Semi-finals**; Best of 73 frames
John Spencer (ENG)	33
**Ray Reardon (WAL)**	**37**
Gary Owen (WAL)	13
**John Pulman (ENG)**	**37**

**Final**; Best of 73 frames
**Ray Reardon (WAL)**	**37**
John Pulman (ENG)	33

== Century breaks ==
Two century breaks were made at the tournament. (Note: There were no century breaks by Bennett, Davis, Pulman, Rea, Spencer, Taylor or Williams)

- 118 – Ray Reardon
- 105 – Gary Owen
