= 1974 Watney Open =

Watney Open
Tournament information
- Dates: 7 September – 22 December 1974
- Venue: Northern Snooker Centre
- City: Leeds
- Country: England
- Organisation: WPBSA
- Format: Non-ranking event
- Total prize fund: £3,000
- Winner's share: £1,000

Final
- Champion: (Northern Ireland) Alex Higgins
- Runner-up: (England) Fred Davis
- Score: 17–11

The 1974 Watney Open was a professional invitational snooker tournament, which took place between 7 September and 22 December 1974 at the Northern Snooker Centre in Leeds. Sixteen players participated, including several invited amateurs. It was played on a knockout basis with one match each weekend. Alex Higgins defeated Fred Davis 17–11 in the final, winning £1,000.

== Main draw ==
Results are shown below.

Last 16; Best of 25 frames
(Northern Ireland) Alex Higgins	13
(England) Ron Barnes	4
(England) Rex Williams	13
(England) Sid Hood	3
(Wales) Ray Reardon	13
(England) David Taylor	8
(Northern Ireland) Dennis Taylor	w/o
(Wales) Marcus Owen	w/d
(England) Fred Davis	13
(Wales) Dave Thomas	5
(Republic of Ireland) Patsy Fagan	13
(England) John Pulman	5
(England) John Spencer	13
(England) Paul Medati	5
(England) Graham Miles	13
(England) Ray Kell	6

Quarter-finals; Best of 25 frames
(Northern Ireland) Alex Higgins	13
(England) Rex Williams	4
(Wales) Ray Reardon	13
(Northern Ireland) Dennis Taylor	?
(England) Fred Davis	13
(Republic of Ireland) Patsy Fagan	9
(England) John Spencer	13
(England) Graham Miles	8

Semi-finals; Best of 25 frames
(Northern Ireland) Alex Higgins	13
(Wales) Ray Reardon	11
(England) Fred Davis	13
(England) John Spencer	12

Final; Best of 33 frames
(Northern Ireland) Alex Higgins	17
(England) Fred Davis	11
