= 1978 UK Championship =

1978 Coral UK Championship
Tournament information
- Dates: 22 November – 1 December 1978
- Venue: Preston Guild Hall
- City: Preston
- Country: England
- Organisation: WPBSA
- Format: Non-ranking event
- Total prize fund: £12,500
- Winner's share: £3,500
- Highest break: (England) Graham Miles (139)

Final
- Champion: (Wales) Doug Mountjoy
- Runner-up: (England) David Taylor
- Score: 15–9

The 1978 UK Championship (officially the 1978 Coral UK Championship) was a professional non-ranking snooker tournament that took place between 22 November and 1 December 1978 at the Guild Hall in Preston, England.

The 1978 tournament was the first of twenty UK Championship competitions to be played in Preston's Guildhall. For the first time, the event was sponsored by Coral who continued to sponsor the UK Championship until 1985.

The most dramatic match came in the qualifying rounds when Terry Griffiths, a newly turned professional, was beaten 8–9 by Rex Williams after leading 8–2. The main stage of the championship also provided plenty of surprises. Patsy Fagan, the defending UK champion, went out 7–9 in the first round to David Taylor who, after a decade in the professional ranks, reached his first major final by beating Alex Higgins 9–5 in the semi-finals. In the other half of the draw, Roy Andrewartha beat John Spencer 9–8 and Willie Thorne beat Ray Reardon 9–6 only to collapse 1–9 against Graham Miles, whose 139 break set a tournament record. In the semi-finals it was Miles' turn to collapse 1–9 to Doug Mountjoy who, keeping his best until last, clinched his final victory over Taylor with a break of 120. The BBC televised the semi-finals in two late night highlights programmes and then the final on their Grandstand programme with Ted Lowe commentating the match.

== Main draw ==
Round of 16
(Republic of Ireland) Patsy Fagan	7
(England) David Taylor	9
(England) John Pulman	3
(England) John Virgo	9
(England) Fred Davis	9
(England) John Dunning	2
(Northern Ireland) Alex Higgins	9
(England) Jim Meadowcroft	6
(Northern Ireland) Dennis Taylor	4
(Wales) Doug Mountjoy	9
(England) John Spencer	8
(Wales) Roy Andrewartha	9
(England) Graham Miles	9
(England) Rex Williams	8
(Wales) Ray Reardon	6
(England) Willie Thorne	9

Quarter-finals
(England) David Taylor	9
(England) John Virgo	2
(England) Fred Davis	4
(Northern Ireland) Alex Higgins	9
(Wales) Doug Mountjoy	9
(Wales) Roy Andrewartha	4
(England) Graham Miles	9
(England) Willie Thorne	1

Semi-finals
(England) David Taylor	9
(Northern Ireland) Alex Higgins	5
(Wales) Doug Mountjoy	9
(England) Graham Miles	1

Final
(England) David Taylor	9
(Wales) Doug Mountjoy	15

== Final ==
Final: Best of 29 frames. Referee: John Williams; The Guild Hall, Preston, England, 30 November and 1 December 1978.
Doug Mountjoy; Wales	15–9	David Taylor; England
First session: 32–61, 76–16, 115–18, 29–75, 47–65 (60), 55–44, Second session: 65–33, 62–32, 19–84, 7–74 (55), 46–74, 35–81, 80–34 (68), 74–29 (58), Third session: 64–22, 88–33 (50), 57–66 (52), 65–35, 84–51, 58–39, Fourth session:26–83, 112–33, 90–26 (63), 120–1 (120)
120	Highest break	60
1	Century breaks	0
6	50+ breaks	2

== Qualifying ==
Last 24 Best of 17 frames

(England) David Taylor 9–2 Maurice Parkin (England)

(England) John Virgo 9–4 Ray Edmonds (England)

(England) John Dunning 9–3 David Greaves (England)

(England) Jim Meadowcroft 9–5 Jackie Rea (Northern Ireland)

(Wales) Doug Mountjoy 9–5 John Barrie (England)

(Wales) Roy Andrewartha 9–3 Pat Houlihan (England)

(England) Rex Williams 9–8 Terry Griffiths (Wales)

(England) Willie Thorne 9–4 Bernard Bennett (England)

== Century breaks ==
- 139 – Graham Miles
- 120, 118 – Doug Mountjoy
- 101 – John Dunning
