= Roy Andrewartha =

Welsh professional snooker player (1938–2020)

Personal information
- Born: 23 April 1938 Tredegar
- Died: 15 October 2020 (aged 82)

Sport
- Country: Wales
- Sport: Snooker
- Professional: 1976–1984
- Highest ranking: 47 (1984/1985)
- Best ranking finish: Last 32 (x1)

Roy Andrewartha (23 April 1938 – 15 October 2020) was a Welsh professional snooker player.

== Career ==
Born in 1938, Andrewartha lost in the 1976 final of the English Amateur Championship to Chris Ross. He played in the World Amateur Snooker Championship in Johannesburg later in 1976, representing England, finishing third in his qualifying group and then losing an elimination match 0–4 against Terry Griffiths. As an amateur he had played against Ray Reardon in the 1976 Canadian Club Masters; Reardon won 3–2.

He turned professional in the 1976–77 snooker season. In qualifying for the 1977 World Championship, Andrewartha faced John Virgo, but lost 1–11. At the 1978 tournament, he whitewashed Jack Karnehm 9–0 before being defeated 3–9 by Doug Mountjoy in the last 24.

In the 1978–79 snooker season, Andrewartha reached the quarter-finals of the 1978 UK Championship. In his last-24 match, he defeated Pat Houlihan 9–3; in the following round he faced John Spencer, the incumbent World Champion, but this resulted in a 9–8 win. At the quarter-final stage, he again met Mountjoy and was defeated, this time 4–9.

At the 1980 UK Championship, he defeated Tony Knowles 9–8 and John Pulman 9–6, but lost 3–9 to Reardon in the last 16. He played in the Welsh Professional Championship from 1981 to 1984, but never won a match in the event, losing to Cliff Wilson in 1981, Mountjoy in 1982, Reardon in 1984, and Griffiths in 1984.

The next time Andrewartha reached the latter stages of a major event was at the 1984 World Championship, where he beat Eddie McLaughlin 10–8 and Mark Wildman 10–9 to qualify for the first round at the Crucible Theatre for the first time. Facing Eddie Charlton, Andrewartha lost 4–10.

Ranked 47th in the world for the 1984/1985 season, Andrewartha played only two matches therein; he lost 0–5 to Danny Fowler at the 1984 International Open, and 2–5 to Dave Chalmers in that year's Grand Prix. He did not enter another tournament, and resigned from the World Professional Billiards and Snooker Association in September 1984, saying that he was disillusioned with playing as a professional.

He died on 15 October 2020, aged 82.
