= David Taylor (snooker player) =

English snooker player (born 1943)

Personal information
- Nickname: The Silver Fox
- Born: 29 July 1943 (age 83) Bowdon, Cheshire, England

Sport
- Country: England
- Sport: Snooker
- Professional: 1968–1997
- Highest ranking: 7 (1981/82)
- Best ranking finish: Runner-up

David Taylor (born 29 July 1943) is an English former professional snooker player. He won the English Amateur Championship 11–6 against Chris Ross in 1968 and the 1968 World Amateur Snooker Championship 8–7 against Max Williams later that year. Those wins encouraged him to turn professional. He was nicknamed "The Silver Fox" because of his prematurely grey hair.

Taylor reached three major professional finals, the 1978 UK Championship, the 1981 Yamaha Organs Trophy and the 1982 Jameson International, but lost them all. Together with his team-mates Steve Davis and John Spencer, he won the 1981 World Team Classic, representing England. His best performance at the World Snooker Championship was at the 1980 event, when he reached the semi-finals. He was also a losing quarter-finalist in three editions. Taylor was a member of the elite top 16 of the world rankings for ten consecutive years until the 1985–86 snooker season, reaching a high of number 7 in the 1981–82 season.

== Early life and career ==
David Taylor was born on 29 July 1943 in Bowdon, Greater Manchester, and grew up in Manchester. He started playing snooker aged 14. After being banned from fencing at a local youth club for dangerous behaviour, looking for an alternative pastime, he played on the club's smaller-scale billiard tables before moving on to use full-size tables. After leaving school, he took up a career as a hairdresser; he said in a 1984 interview that "the theory behind that move was there'd be plenty of girls."

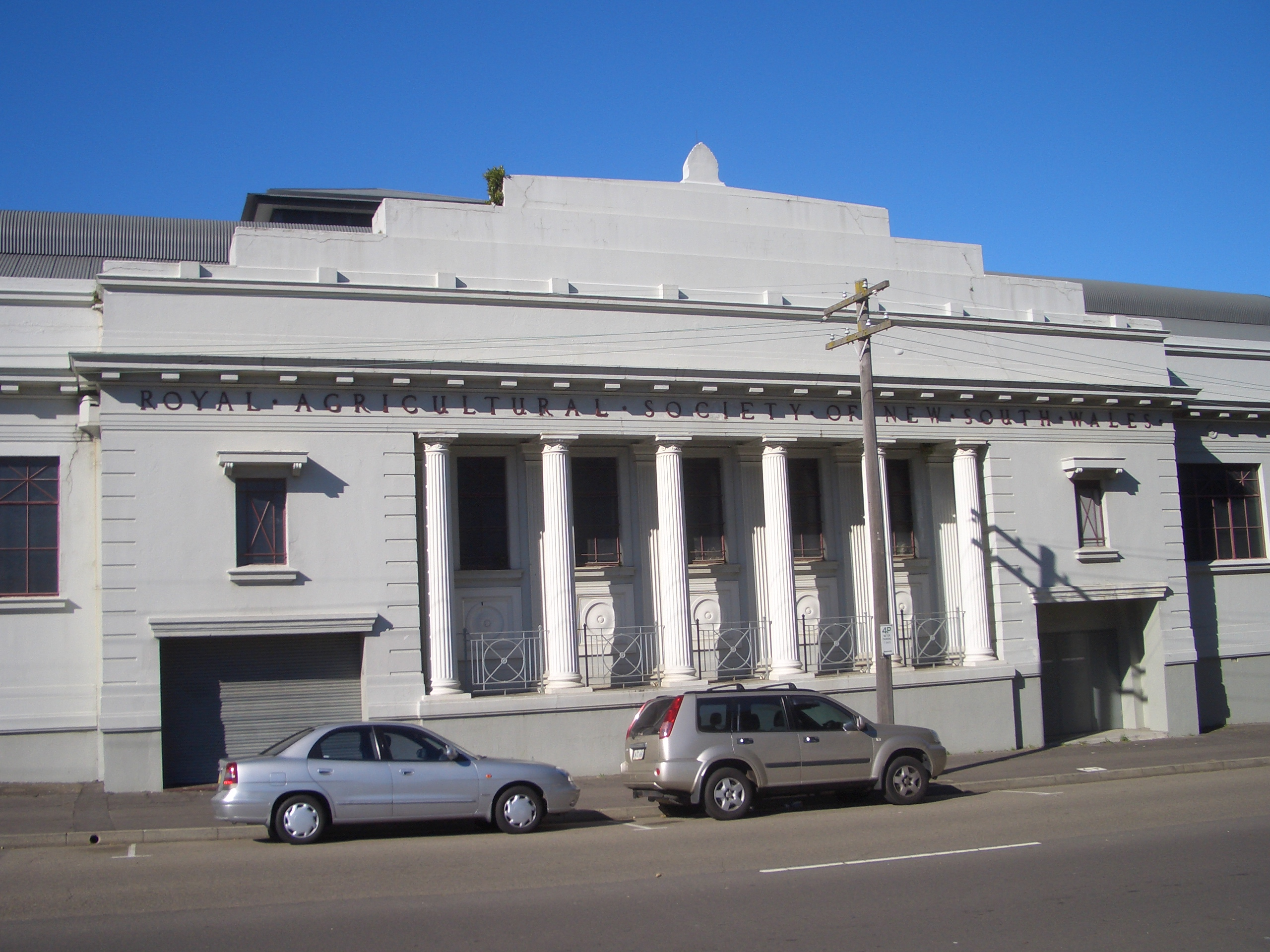
Taylor won the 1968 World Amateur Snooker Championship at the Hordern Pavilion (pictured in 2007)

In 1968 he defeated Chris Ross 11–6 to win the English Amateur Championship. At the 1968 World Amateur Snooker Championship in Australia he won all four of his group matches, then beat Paddy Morgan in the semi-final before securing the title with an 8–7 victory against Max Williams, to become the youngest-ever snooker world champion at the time. He also recorded the highest break of the tournament, 96. He turned professional on his return to the UK. Alongside his snooker career, he changed profession from hairdresser to swimming coach to allow more time for snooker practice. There were few professional tournaments in the early 1970s, and Taylor accepted an offer to play exhibition matches at holiday camps.

In his first world championship match, at the 1970 event, he finished the first day of his match against Bernard Bennett 3–4 behind, but progressed to the quarter-finals by securing a winning margin at 11–8. A match report in Billiards and Snooker magazine was critical of the standard of play by both players, and in particular about Taylor "carelessly" missing pots. Facing John Pulman, Tayor was on level terms at 12–12, but Pulman won 31–20. In 1971 he lost 2–5 against reigning world champion John Spencer for the Stratford Professional title. He was seeded into the quarter-finals of the 1972 World Championship and lost 25–31 to Eddie Charlton.

In 1978 Taylor and fellow professional players John Virgo and Jim Meadowcroft were featured discussing their careers in the television programme This England. Taylor was part of the commentary team when Steve Davis made the first televised maximum break at the 1982 Lada Classic, which he later described as “a magic night”. He appeared in Pro-celebrity Snooker, in which professional snooker players paired with celebrities in a televised competition, partnering Mike Burton (1980), Brian Close (1981), Duggie Brown (1983), and Bill Maynard (1984). In the 1990s he featured several times on the snooker-themed game show Big Break.

== Professional finals and later career ==
Taylor reached three major professional finals, but lost them all. His first major final was the 1978 UK Championship, where, after progressing past Maurice Parkin, he eliminated defending champion Patsy Fagan 9–7. He then defeated both Virgo and Alex Higgins, but lost ten of the last twelve frames in the final against Doug Mountjoy and Mountjoy won 15–9. He lost 6–9 to Davis in the 1981 Yamaha Organs Trophy final after winning four consecutive frames from 2–8 behind. Earlier in the tournament he had topped the round-robin group that also included Ray Reardon, Mountjoy, and Graham Miles, then defeated Kirk Stevens 5–3 in the semi-finals. After the tournament he commented that he felt like he had been a professional player "in name only until 1977" but could now go on to win a title. In 1978 he made three consecutive total clearances of 130, 140, and 139 at Butlin's Minehead, an achievement that was recognised in the Guinness Book of Records. By 1980 he was known as "The Silver Fox" because of his prematurely grey hair, a nickname coined by commentator Ted Lowe.

He was a member of the England team that won the 1981 World Team Classic, alongside Davis and Spencer. In the group match against Australia, Taylor lost against Morgan and Ian Anderson, and against Northern Ireland he lost against Higgins but defeated Tommy Murphy. England won both group matches by four matches to three, and progressed. In the semi-finals, he defeated Bill Werbeniuk 2–1 but then lost to Stevens by the same margin, and England won by four matches to two. Although Taylor lost both of his matches in the final, 1–2 against Terry Griffiths and 0–2 to Mountjoy, England took the title when Davis won the tiebreak match against Reardon, leaving the score at four matches to three.

The 1982 Jameson International final was the first tournament apart from the World Snooker Championship to count in the snooker world rankings. Taylor was 3–5 behind Knowles after the first session, after the pair had been level at 2–2. Knowles compiled a break of 114, the highest of the tournament, to win the ninth frame, before Taylor claimed the next two frames to leave Knowles one ahead at 6–5. Breaks of 63 and 43 in the next two frames saw Knowles restore a three-frame advantage. Taylor made a break of 74 to win the 14th frame, but Knowles secured his first major title by claiming the 15th frame with a break of 76. In the quarter-finals Taylor beat the then world champion, Steve Davis, 5–3.

Taylor was a member of the elite Top 16 world rankings for ten consecutive years until the 1985–86 snooker season, reaching a high of number 7 in the 1981–82 season. His best performance in the World Championship was at the 1980 event, when he lost to Cliff Thorburn 7–16 in the semi-final after beating the six-time world champion Reardon 13–11 in the quarter-final. He also reached the World Championship quarter-finals in 1981 as well as the quarter-finals at the 1981 International Open and at the 1987 British Open.

In the 1988–89 snooker season the WPBSA held three non-ranking tournaments for players who had been eliminated in the early rounds of specific ranking events. Taylor won the third of these, defeating Craig Edwards, Martin Smith, Jon Wright, and David Roe to reach the final against Steve Meakin, whom Taylor beat 9–1 to win the title. At the end of the 1996–97 snooker season he was ranked 151st, and therefore did not qualify to automatically continue as a professional. In January 1998 he was co-opted as a board member of the WPBSA, but was voted out in the December elections that year.

Taylor played at the 2000 World Seniors Masters and defeated Miles in the single-frame format competition before losing to Willie Thorne in the semi-finals. He entered the 2010 World Snooker Championship qualifying rounds, aged 66 and playing in first competitive match for 13 years, but lost 1–5 to Paul Wykes.

When discussing his 1978–79 quarter-final match with Taylor, Virgo wrote that "Taylor, in practice, was one of the best players I'd ever seen, second perhaps only to [Alex] Higgins." Thorburn commented that Taylor did not seem able to bring his ability in practice into tournament play, and that he probably overthought during matches. Reardon made a similar observation, saying that, although Taylor "look[ed] so good in practice", he failed to match his nickname: "A fox is a hungry, crafty fighter, but David displays little of those characteristics."

== Personal life ==
Taylor had two sons from his first marriage to Francine. As of 1984 he was married to Janice Whitlock, whom he met at a holiday camp in the early 1970s, and had a two-year-old son with her. In 1981, after he had earned the largest prize money of his career to date, £5000 for reaching the final of the Yamaha Organs Trophy, he told Alexander Clyde of The Evening Standard that he was grateful for the encouragement and support that Janice had provided for his career and that for an earlier period of about three years they had lived almost entirely from her income.

Taylor entered the property business using money from a winning bet on John Spencer to win the world championship. Soon after he made his last appearance in the televised stages of the world championship in 1987, Taylor and his wife decided to purchase a guest house in Little Bollington near Altrincham in Cheshire. They were still running the business as of 2021. He had the table used for the 1987 Masters installed at the premises for his use.

== Performance and rankings timeline ==
Tournament	1969/ 70	1970/ 71	1971/ 72	1972/ 73	1973/ 74	1974/ 75	1975/ 76	1976/ 77	1977/ 78	1978/ 79	1979/ 80	1980/ 81	1981/ 82	1982/ 83	1983/ 84	1984/ 85	1985/ 86	1986/ 87	1987/ 88	1988/ 89	1989/ 90	1990/ 91	1991/ 92	1992/ 93	1993/ 94	1994/ 95	1995/ 96	1996/ 97	Ref.
Ranking	No ranking system							16	12	13	15	9	7	8	10	16	14	21	25	28	38	33	44	104	67	104	106	151	
Ranking tournaments
Hong Kong Open (Ranking event from 1989) (Note: The event was also called the Australian Masters (1979/1980–1987/1988) and Australian Open (1994/1995).)	Tournament Not Held										Not invited				1R	QF	1R	Not invited		NH	1R	Tournament Not Held							
Asian Classic (Note: The event was also called the Dubai Masters (1988/1989), Dubai Classic (1989/1990–1994/1995) and Thailand Classic (1995/1996).)	Tournament Not Held																			A	1R	1R	1R	LQ	LQ	LQ	LQ	LQ	
Grand Prix (Note: The event was also called the Professional Players Tournament (1982/1983–1983/1984).)	Tournament Not Held													2R	2R	3R	2R	1R	1R	1R	LQ	LQ	1R	LQ	LQ	LQ	LQ	LQ	
Canadian Masters (Note: The event was also called the Canadian Open (1978/1979–1980/1981).)	Tournament Not Held					Non-Ranking							Tournament Not Held				Non-Ranking			2R	Tournament Not Held								
UK Championship (Ranking event from 1984)	Tournament Not Held								2R	F	1R	2R	2R	2R	2R	2R	3R	2R	2R	1R	1R	1R	1R	LQ	LQ	LQ	LQ	LQ	
German Open	Tournament Not Held																										LQ	A	
Welsh Open	Tournament Not Held																						LQ	1R	LQ	LQ	LQ	LQ	
International Open (Ranking event from 1982) (Note: The event was also called the Goya Matchroom Trophy (1985/1986).)	Tournament Not Held												QF	F	1R	2R	3R	3R	2R	3R	LQ	Not Held		LQ	LQ	LQ	LQ	LQ	
European Open	Tournament Not Held																			1R	2R	LQ	1R	LQ	LQ	LQ	LQ	LQ	
Classic (Ranking event from 1984)	Tournament Not Held										A	SF	QF	QF	1R	1R	1R	1R	2R	3R	2R	LQ	LQ	Tournament Not Held					
Thailand Open (Note: The event was also called the Thailand Masters (1983/1984–1986/1987 & 1991/1992) and the Asian Open (1989/1990–1992/1993).)	Tournament Not Held														Non-Ranking Event				Not Held		1R	1R	1R	LQ	LQ	LQ	LQ	LQ	
British Open (Ranking event from 1985) (Note: The event was also called the British Gold Cup (1979/1980), Yamaha Organs Trophy (1980/1981) and International Masters (1981/1982–1983/1984).)	Tournament Not Held										RR	F	2R	2R	RR	1R	1R	QF	1R	1R	1R	1R	1R	LQ	LQ	LQ	LQ	LQ	
Strachan Open	Tournament Not Held																						1R	Tournament Not Held					
World Championship (Ranking event from 1974)	QF	A	QF	2R	1R	2R	1R	1R	1R	1R	SF	QF	1R	2R	2R	2R	1R	1R	LQ	LQ	LQ	LQ	LQ	LQ	LQ	LQ	LQ	LQ	
Non-ranking tournaments
The Masters	Tournament Not Held					Not invited				QF	Not invited		1R	1R	1R	1R	1R	Not invited				LQ	LQ	Not invited					
Irish Masters	Tournament Not Held					Not invited								1R	Not invited														
Professional Snooker League	Tournament Not Held														11th	Not Held		Not invited											
Men of the Midlands	Not Held		RR	NI	Tournament Not Held																								
Norwich Union Open	Tournament Not Held				2R	NI	Tournament Not Held																						
Watney Open	Tournament Not Held					1R	Tournament Not Held																						
Holsten Lager International	Tournament Not Held									QF	Tournament Not Held																		
Tolly Cobbold Classic	Tournament Not Held									Not invited			QF	Not invited		Tournament Not Held													
New Zealand Masters	Tournament Not Held															SF	Not Held			Not invited		Tournament Not Held							
Pot Black	NI	RR	Not invited									RR	RR	NI	1R	1R	1R	Tournament Not Held					Not invited			Tournament Not Held			
English Professional Championship	Tournament Not Held											2R	Not Held			QF	1R	2R	1R	1R	Tournament Not Held								
Shoot-Out	Tournament Not Held																					1R	Tournament Not Held						
World Masters	Tournament Not Held																					LQ	Tournament Not Held						

Performance Table Legend
LQ	lost in the qualifying draw	#R	lost in the early rounds of the tournament (WR = Wildcard round, RR = Round robin)	QF	lost in the quarter-finals
SF	lost in the semi-finals	F	lost in the final	A	did not participate in the tournament
NI	was not invited	WD	withdrew from the tournament	NH	means an event was not held.

== Career finals ==
=== Ranking finals: 1 ===
Ranking finals contested by David Taylor
Outcome	No.	Year	Championship	Opponent in the final	Score	Ref.
Runner-up	1.	1982	International Open	Tony Knowles (ENG)	6–9	

=== Non-ranking finals: 4 (1 title) ===
Legend
UK Championship (0–1)
Other (1–2)

Outcome	No.	Year	Championship	Opponent in the final	Score	Ref.
Runner-up	1.	1971	Stratford Professional	John Spencer (ENG)	2–5	
Runner-up	2.	1978	UK Championship	Doug Mountjoy (WAL)	9–15	
Runner-up	3.	1981	Yamaha Organs Trophy	Steve Davis (ENG)	6–9	
Winner	1.	1988	WPBSA Invitational – Event 3	Steve Meakin (ENG)	9–1	

=== Team finals: 1 (1 title) ===
Outcome	No.	Year	Championship	Team	Opponents in the final	Score	Ref.
Winner	1.	1981	World Team Classic	England (with Steve Davis and John Spencer)	Wales (Ray Reardon, Terry Griffiths and Doug Mountjoy)	4–3	

=== Amateur finals: 2 (2 titles) ===
Outcome	No.	Year	Championship	scope="col"Opponent in the final	Score	Ref.
Winner	1.	1968	English Amateur Championship	Chris Ross (SCO)	11–6	
Winner	2.	1968	World Amateur Championship	Max Williams (AUS)	8–7	
