= 1981 World Team Classic =

State Express World Team Classic
Tournament information
- Dates: 24 October – 1 November 1981
- Venue: Hexagon Theatre
- City: Reading
- Country: England
- Format: Non-ranking event
- Total prize fund: £40,000
- Winner's share: £12,000
- Highest break: Terry Griffiths (WAL), 127

Final
- Champion: England
- Runner-up: Wales
- Score: 4–3 (matches)

The 1981 World Team Classic, sponsored by State Express, was the new name of the team snooker tournament. It moved to the Hexagon Theatre in Reading with seven teams competing as the Irish players were divided. Scotland competed for the first time and lost to the Republic of Ireland in a play-off. The Republic of Ireland reached the round robin stage of the competition. All matches, including the final, were played as a best of six match with a tie break between the captains if the score was 3–3. England won their first match when captain Steve Davis won three of the four matches against Eddie Charlton of Australia. England and Wales played in the final.

John Spencer made the highest break of the tournament with a score of 103.

== Main draw ==
Teams and results are listed below.

=== Teams ===
| Country | Player 1 (Captain) | Player 2 | Player 3 |
|---|---|---|---|
| Wales | Ray Reardon | Terry Griffiths | Doug Mountjoy |
| England | Steve Davis | John Spencer | David Taylor |
| Northern Ireland | Alex Higgins | Dennis Taylor | Tommy Murphy |
| Canada | Cliff Thorburn | Bill Werbeniuk | Kirk Stevens |
| Australia | Eddie Charlton | Paddy Morgan | Ian Anderson |
| Ireland | Patsy Fagan | Dessie Sheehan | Eugene Hughes |
| Scotland | Eddie Sinclair | Matt Gibson | Ian Black |

=== Qualifying round ===
| Team 1 | Score | Team 2 | Date |
|---|---|---|---|
| Republic of Ireland | 4–2 | Scotland | |

=== Group A ===
| Team 1 | Score | Team 2 | Date |
|---|---|---|---|
| England | 4–3 | Australia | |
| Northern Ireland | 4–1 | Australia | |
| England | 4–3 | Northern Ireland | |

=== Group B ===
| Team 1 | Score | Team 2 | Date |
|---|---|---|---|
| Wales | 4–2 | Canada | |
| Wales | 4–0 | Republic of Ireland | |
| Canada | 4–2 | Republic of Ireland | |

=== Semi-finals ===
| Team 1 | Score | Team 2 | Date |
|---|---|---|---|
| England | 4–2 | Canada | |
| Wales | 4–3 | Northern Ireland | |

== Final ==
Final: Best of 7 matches. Hexagon Theatre, Reading, England. 1 November 1981.
| England; Steve Davis, John Spencer, David Taylor | 4–3 | Wales; Ray Reardon, Terry Griffiths, Doug Mountjoy |
Spencer v Reardon: 37–63, 91–45, 54–66; Davis v Mountjoy: 87 (60)–45, 100–14; Taylor v Griffiths: 77–48, 33–72 (53), 64–71 (50); Spencer v Griffiths: 75–63, 7–114, 105–0; Taylor v Mountjoy: 30–77, 34–94; Davis v Reardon: 80–32, 59–11, Play off: 69–52
| 103 (Spencer) | Highest break | 63 (Mountjoy) |
| 1 | Century breaks | 0 |
| 3 | 50+ breaks | 4 |
