= Bernard Bennett =

English snooker player (1931–2002)

Personal information
- Born: 31 August 1931 Kingston-upon-Thames, England
- Died: 12 January 2002 (aged 70) Southampton, England

Sport
- Country: England
- Sport: Snooker
- Professional: 1968–1995
- Highest ranking: 18 (1976/77)

Bernard Bennett (31 August 1931 – 12 January 2002) was an English player of snooker and English billiards, whose professional career spanned from 1968 to 1995, during which he experienced limited success as a player. He owned the Castle Snooker Club in Southampton, which opened in 1970 and was one of the first modern snooker centres. From there, he staged professional and pro-am competitions that attracted the leading players of the day.

He turned professional in 1968, despite not having a track record of success as an amateur. He entered every World Snooker Championship from 1969 to 1995, with the exception of the November 1970 Championship, which was held in Australia, and that of 1993. In 1971 he challenged Rex Williams for the World Billiards championship title. He lost the match, played at the Castle Club, by 4,058 points to 9,250.

== Playing career ==
Bernard Bennett was born in Kingston-upon-Thames, Surrey on 31 August 1931 and was introduced to snooker by his elder brother John. He worked as a carpenter, and in 1965 moved from Kingston to Southampton where he set up in the building trade. In 1968, he won the Southampton championships in both billiards and snooker, becoming the first player to achieve this.

Bennett turned professional in 1968, without any significant amateur record. He had participated in the English Amateur Championship several times without progressing further than the last-16 round of the Southern region. He entered the 1969 World Snooker Championship and was defeated in the first round 4–25 by Rex Williams. In the 1970 event, he lost in the first round 8–11 by David Taylor.

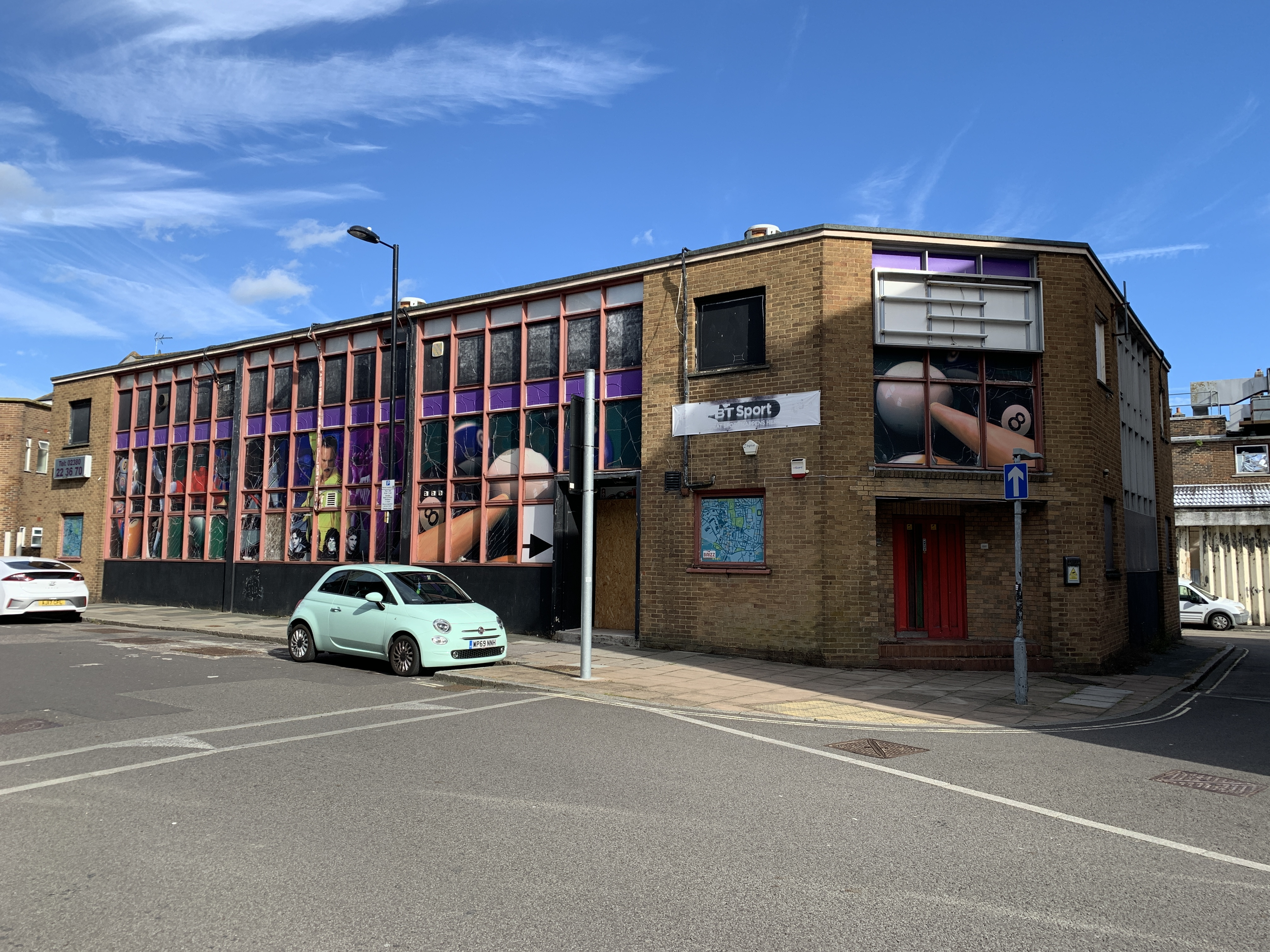
Premises of the Castle Club (pictured in 2021)

Bennett was the owner of the Castle Snooker Club in Southampton, which opened in 1970 and was one of the first modern snooker centres. From here, he organised events including the Castle Professional, a mini snooker 'triangular' event featuring three professionals, and the Castle Pro-Am. The Billiard Association and Control Council's official magazine Billiards and Snooker described the first edition of the Castle Pro-Am, which commenced in October 1970, as "the most ambitious Open Snooker tournament ever promoted in Britain". Bennett, who had accrued his money from the building trade, went on to own other snooker clubs in the Southampton area.

The 1972 World Snooker Championship qualifying match between Bennett and Graham Miles was held at the Castle Club. Miles won 15–6. Bennett lost 8–9 to David Greaves in his 1973 World Championship opening match. In the 1974 World Championship, he defeated 1970 finalist Warren Simpson 8–2, to record his first win in the championship. Simpson was affected by ill health, having discharged himself from hospital to play in the tournament, and was attended to by a nurse during the match. Simpson's energy left him and Bennett won the last five frames in a row. Simpson remarked that Bennett "played some very solid snooker and it's been a pleasure to play him." In 1999, Bennett recalled his victory against Simpson as the highlight of his playing career. Bennett was unable to contain Alex Higgins in the second round, and lost 4–15. The win was sufficient to place Bennett in 18th place when professional rankings were first introduced in time for the 1976–77 season. In the 1977–78 snooker season, Bennett defeated John Pulman and drew with Graham Miles to share top place in the three-player Castle Professional Tournament. He also defeated Doug Mountjoy 5–2 in that season's Castle Pro-Am tournament, a result that Snooker Scene described at the time as "the best victory of his career".

During the qualifying competition for the 1978 World Championship, Bennett drew Maurice Parkin, a player who, like himself, had won only one match in the event since his first entry. Over 200 people travelled to Romiley Forum on Easter Monday to watch their match. The affair was a low-scoring one, producing only three breaks over 20 in the first eight frames. Eventually, Parkin pulled away from 5–4 to win 9–4, with a top break in the match of only 29, bettered by Bennett's 31 in frame nine. At the 1979 World Championship, Bennett drew Terry Griffiths, in the first round of qualifying. Bennett won the first two frames but lost the match 2–9. Griffiths went on to win the tournament, becoming World Champion at his first attempt.

Bennett played more through his love of the game. He lost 0–10 to Sakchai Sim Ngam in the 1986 World Championship qualifying, and by the same margin to Billy Kelly in 1987. Following this latter defeat, Bennett slipped to 124th in the world rankings, meaning that he was among the first group of professional players to lose full tournament playing rights. Able only to enter the World Championship, Bennett played in the 1988 event, losing 5–10 to Jim Meadowcroft, after the first six frames had been shared. However, in the 1989 event, after a gap of 15 years, Bennett won his second world championship match in defeating Clive Everton 10–4. He also led veteran Fred Davis 3–1 in the second round of qualifying, but lost the match 4–10. In the 1990 edition, Bennett led Andrew Cairns 4–3 in the first qualifying round, but made no further progress in losing the match 4–10.

1991 was no more successful for Bennett, as he lost 2–10 to Jason Whittaker in his first match, and he was whitewashed once more in 1992 – this time beaten 0–10 by Anthony Hamilton. He did not enter the 1993 edition, but was again beaten without winning a frame in 1994, losing to Andrew Atkinson 0–5. His final attempt at qualifying, in 1995, ended in identical fashion, with him being beaten 0–5 by Alfie Burden.

He partnered with Pat Houlihan for the World Doubles Championship each year from 1982 to 1986; they did not win more than one match in any of these editions.

=== English billiards ===
Bennett challenged Williams for the World Professional Billiards and Snooker Association (WPBSA) version of the World Billiards title in 1971. It was the first challenge match played after Williams had successfully challenged Clark McConachy in 1968; the first title match held since 1951. Bennett provided both the financial guarantee, and, in the Castle Club, the venue for the event. He was defeated 4,058–9,250 by Willaims in a match that the billiards historian Clive Everton described as "farcical", remarking that Bennett had "no substantial previous billiards achievement". While Bennett recorded two century breaks, 132 and 106, Williams made over 25, including a best of 480.

In 1980, the World Championship was revived as a knock-out, for the first time since 1934. Bennett entered, but lost 678–1,968 to Mark Wildman in the qualifying round. When the event was next held, in 1982, he lost to Everton in the first round, but in 1983 he defeated Graham Cripsey and Jack Fitzmaurice to reach the quarter-finals, where he lost to eventual champion Williams. He also won first-round matches at the UK Championship to reach the quarter-finals in 1980 against Chris Ross and in 1983 against Greaves.

== Death and legacy ==
The Castle Pro-Am event proved beneficial to a number of professional players; at the end of the 1975–76 season, Alex Higgins, who was placed second on that season's Order of Merit, had earned only £2,250 from the three main events of the season, but won £500 as the victor of the 1975 edition alone. The 1978/79 edition, which had a prize fund of £3,500, attracted almost all of the professional players who were in the country at the time. In 1984, Bennett opened another snooker hall, the 147 Executive Club, on the ground floor below his Castle Club.

Bennett, who was married to Irene and had three sons, died on 12 January 2002 at the Chalybeate Hospital, at the age of 70. His obituary in Snooker Scene said that he was "unanimously regarded with affection throughout the sport."

== Snooker ==
=== Non-ranking titles: (2 titles) ===
- Southampton Invitational Tournament – 1968
- Castle Professional Tournament – 1977(Shared title with Graham Miles)

== Performance and rankings timeline ==
Performance Tables Legend
LQ	lost in the qualifying draw	#R	lost in the early rounds of the tournament (RR = Round robin)	QF	lost in the quarter-finals
DNQ	did not qualify for the tournament	A	did not participate in the tournament	WD	withdrew from the tournament
NH	not held	UR	unranked	†	triple crown event

Snooker rankings and performance
Snooker Season	1968/ 69	1969/ 70	1970/ 71	1971/ 72	1972/ 73	1973/ 74	1974/ 75	1975/ 76	1976/ 77	1977/ 78	1978/ 79	1979/ 80	1980/ 81	1981/ 82	1982/ 83	1983/ 84	1984/ 85	1985/ 86	1986/ 87	1987/ 88	1988/ 89	1989/ 90	1990/ 91	1991/ 92	1992/ 93	1993/ 94	1994/ 95	Ref.
Ranking	No ranking system								18	24	25	27	26	UR	UR	UR	UR	94	114	123	129	134	141	148	264	380	553	
Dubai Classic (Note: The event was also called the Dubai Masters (1988/1989).) (Ranking event from 1989)	Not Held																				A	A	A	LQ	A	A	A	
Grand Prix (Note: The event was also called the Professional Players Tournament (1982/1983–1983/1984).) (Ranking event)	Not Held														1R	1R	LQ	LQ	LQ	A	A	A	A	LQ	A	A	A	
†UK Championship (Ranking event from 1984)	Not Held									1R	1R	LQ	LQ	LQ	LQ	LQ	LQ	LQ	LQ	A	A	A	A	LQ	A	A	A	
European Open (Ranking event)	Not Held																				A	A	A	WD	WD	A	A	
Welsh Open (Ranking event)	Not Held																							WD	A	WD	A	
Classic (Ranking event)	Not Held											Non-Ranking Event				LQ	LQ	LQ	LQ	A	A	A	LQ	LQ	Not Held			
British Open] (Note: The event was also called the British Gold Cup (1979/1980), Yamaha Organs Trophy (1980/1981) and International Masters (1981/1982–1983/1984).) (Ranking event from 1985)	Not Held											A	A	A	A	LQ	1R	LQ	LQ	A	A	A	LQ	LQ	LQ	WD	A	
International Open (Note: The event was also called the Matchroom Trophy (1985/1986).) (Ranking event from 1982)	Not Held													LQ	LQ	LQ	LQ	LQ	LQ	A	A	A	Not Held		WD	WD	A	
†World Championship (Ranking event from 1974)	QF	1R	A	LQ	1R	2R	LQ	LQ	LQ	LQ	LQ	LQ	LQ	LQ	LQ	LQ	LQ	LQ	LQ	LQ	LQ	LQ	LQ	LQ	A	LQ	LQ	
†The Masters (Non-ranking)	Not Held						Not invited																WD	WD	A	A	A	
Canadian Open (Non-ranking)	Not Held						A	A	A	A	A	1R	A	Not Held				A	A	A	R	Not Held						
English Professional Championship (Non-ranking)	Not Held												1R	Not Held			LQ	LQ	LQ	LQ	LQ	Not Held						
Shoot-Out (Non-ranking)	Not Held																						1R	Not Held				

English billiards performances
	1979	1980	1981	1982	1983	1984	1985	1986	1987	1988	1989	1990	1991	Ref.
World Championship	NH	LQ (Note: There was also a challenge match between Fred Davis and Rex Williams in May 1980.)	NH	1R	QF	1R	1R	1R	A	LQ	A	NH	A	
UK Championship	QF	QF	LQ	NH	QF	Not Held			2R	LQ,LQ (Note: There were two editions in 1988.)	NH	WD	LQ	
European Championship	Not Held								1R	A	Not Held			
Yorkshire Bank Open	Not Held									LQ	A	NH	NH	
British Open	Not Held										A	LQ	A	
World Matchplay	Not Held										1R	A	NH	
