= 1968 World Amateur Snooker Championship =

Tournament information
- Dates: 16 September – 4 October 1968
- City: Sydney
- Country: Australia
- Organisation: Billiards Association and Control Club
- Format: Round-robin and knockout
- Highest break: David Taylor (ENG) 96

Final
- Champion: David Taylor (ENG)
- Runner-up: Max Williams (AUS)
- Score: 8–7

The 1968 World Amateur Snooker Championship was the third edition of the championship that later became known as the IBSF World Snooker Championship, the first event having been held in 1963. The 1968 tournament was played in Australia with two round-robin groups, one held in Adelaide and one on Melbourne, and the semi-finals and final being played at the Hordern Pavilion, Sydney.

David Taylor of England defeated Max Williams of Australia 8–7 in the final to win the title. Taylor also made the highest break, 96.

== Qualifying groups ==
Matches in the qualifying groups were all played between 16 and 20 September.

Group A, played at the Albert Park table tennis stadium, Melbourne.

Position	Player	Won	Lost	Frames	Highest break
1	David Taylor (ENG)	4	0	24–13	96
2	Jimmy van Rensberg (RSA)	3	1	22–14	
3	Harry Andrews (AUS)	2	2	17–16	
4	Tony Monteiro (IND)	1	3	17–22	
5	Lance Napper (NZL)	0	4	9–24	

Group B, played at Australia Hall, Adelaide.

Position	Player	Won	Lost	Frames	Highest break
1	Max Williams (AUS)	3	1	22–14	
2	Paddy Morgan (AUS)	3	1	19–14	88
3	Mohammed Lafir (LKA)	2	2	19–16	
4	Shyam Shroff (IND)	2	2	20–19	
5	Dick Flutey (NZL)	0	4	7–24	

== Knockout ==
The semi-final between Williams and van Renberg was played on 29 and 30 September; the semi-final between Taylor and Morgan was played on 1 and 2 October; the final was played on 3 and 4 October.

Semi-finals; Best of 15 frames		Final; Best of 15 frames
David Taylor (ENG)	8
Paddy Morgan (AUS)	3	David Taylor (ENG)	8
Max Williams (AUS)	8	Max Williams (AUS)	7
Jimmy van Rensberg (RSA)	7
