= UK Championship =

Snooker tournament

Tournament information
- Venue: Barbican
- Location: York
- Country: England
- Established: 1977
- Organisation(s): World Snooker Tour
- Format: Ranking event
- Total prize fund: £1,205,000
- Recent edition: 2025
- Current champion: Mark Selby (ENG)

The UK Championship is a professional ranking snooker tournament. It is one of snooker's prestigious Triple Crown events, along with the World Championship and the Masters. It is usually held at the Barbican in York, England. Ronnie O'Sullivan has won the tournament a record eight times, followed by Steve Davis with six titles and Stephen Hendry with five.

== History ==
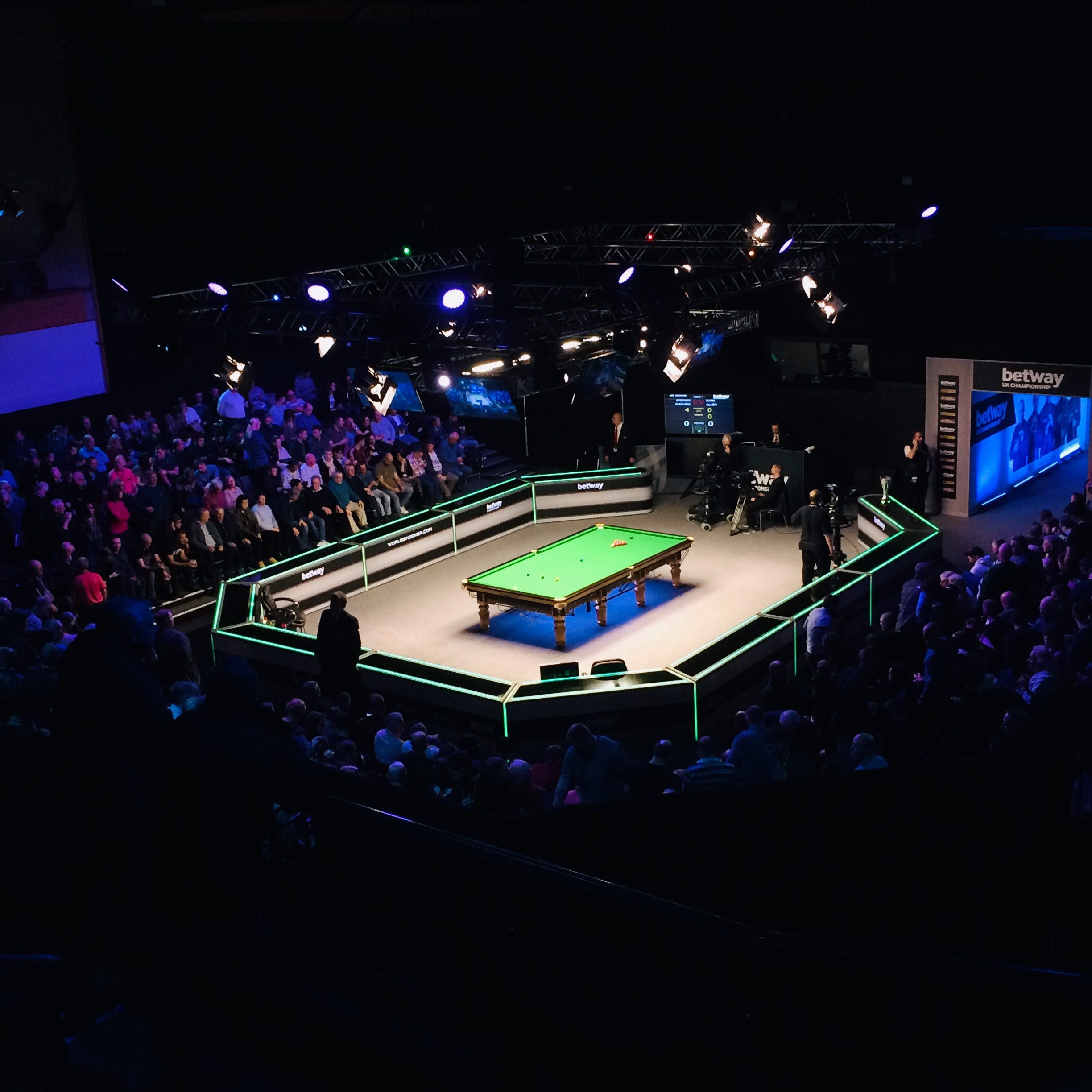
View of setup during the 2019 semi-final.

The UK Championship was first held in 1977 at Tower Circus in Blackpool, as the United Kingdom Professional Snooker Championship, an event open only to British residents and passport holders. Patsy Fagan won the inaugural tournament by defeating Doug Mountjoy by 12 frames to 9 in the final, and won the first prize of £2000. For the following year the event moved to the Guild Hall in Preston, where it remained until 1997.

The rules were changed in 1984, when the tournament was granted ranking status and all professionals were allowed to enter. Since then, it has carried more ranking points than any tournament other than the World Championship until being overtaken by the International Championship and the China Open, both of which yield a higher number of ranking points based on the amount of money in pounds sterling on offer for winning the event.

The tournament has seen many memorable finals. In 1977 and 1979, it provided Patsy Fagan and John Virgo with, respectively, their first and only major tournament wins. In 1980, the tournament was won by Steve Davis, as well as in 1981, when the final between Davis and Terry Griffiths set the stage for four more final battles between the two, who were to dominate the rest of the season before their unexpected losses in the first round of the 1982 World Championship. The 1981 runner-up Griffiths became the champion in 1982, defeating Alex Higgins, who in turn was the winner of the 1983 event, beating Davis 16–15 after having trailed 0–7 at the end of the first session. Between 1984 and 1987, all four tournaments were won by Davis again. In 1985, Willie Thorne led Davis 13–8 at the start of the evening session, only to miss a simple blue off its spot and lose 16–14. The victory regenerated Davis's confidence after his devastating World Championship loss; Thorne, on the other hand, never won another ranking title.

In 1988, Doug Mountjoy, at the age of 46, became the oldest winner of the tournament, and the second-oldest winner of a ranking event (Ray Reardon had won the 1982 Professional Players Tournament at the age of 50). Mountjoy produced a stunning display to win the final 16–12 against the rising Stephen Hendry, at a time when the veteran player's presence in the line-up was widely viewed as just making up the numbers. Even more astonishingly, Mountjoy won the Mercantile Credit Classic the following month, which at the time made him only the fourth player to win two ranking tournaments in a row.

Stephen Hendry's 1989 win prefigured his decade of dominance similar to the one prefigured by Davis's win in 1980; its significance was emphasised by the fact that the losing finalist was Davis himself. Hendry's 16–15 win the following year, over Davis again, spoke to his unique qualities of nerve. The final in 1994 against Ken Doherty is considered by many players as one of Hendry's best performances, for he won 10–5 and made seven century breaks along the way, six of which were in the span of eight frames played. Doherty has appeared in two more memorable finals, in 2001, when Ronnie O'Sullivan beat him 10–1, delivering a final's best winning margin since it had become the best of 19 frames in 1993, a feat repeated three years later, in 2004, by Stephen Maguire against David Gray; and in 2002, when Doherty almost won the tournament against Mark Williams, but lost 9–10 in a dramatic deciding frame.

In 1993, the format of the final was reduced from the best of 31 frames to the best of 19 frames. This is the format still used for the final to the current day. Ronnie O'Sullivan became the youngest-ever winner of the tournament (and any ranking tournament) that year, being just 17 years old at the time. Between 1994 and 1996, the championship was won by Stephen Hendry three times in a row, while from 1997 to 2002, the winner was one of the 'Class of '92' each year, with O'Sullivan, John Higgins and Mark Williams all claiming the title twice during this period.

The 2005 tournament saw Steve Davis, aged 48, reach his first ranking tournament final for almost two years and make his highest break in tournament play for 23 years. In a match that featured the widest age gap between finalists in professional tournament history, he lost 6–10 to the 18-year-old Ding Junhui, who became the first non-British or Irish and the second youngest player after O'Sullivan to win the UK Championship. The following year, Peter Ebdon won the title by defeating Stephen Hendry 10–6.

In 2007, the tournament was won by Ronnie O'Sullivan for the fourth time, as he beat Stephen Maguire 10–2 in the final. The tournament was also notable for O'Sullivan's maximum break in the deciding frame of the semi-final, and for the longest televised frame (77 minutes) between Marco Fu and Mark Selby. The 2009 final saw the reigning world champion John Higgins missing an easy brown and the chance to go 8–6 in front, eventually losing to second-time champion Ding Junhui.

The 2010 final turned out to be another dramatic match, instantly described by many commentators as an all-time classic. At one point, John Higgins, playing in his first major tournament after the end of a six-month ban for his involvement in match-fixing discussions, was 5–9 down to Mark Williams. However, he won the next two frames. At 7–9, Williams led by 29 points with only 27 on the table, leaving Higgins requiring a snooker to remain in the tournament. Higgins got the snooker and cleared the colours. Another frame won by Higgins took the match to the decider. Finally, with only brown, blue, pink and black left at the table, Higgins potted the brown into a top pocket by playing cross-double across the long axis of the table and then added a difficult long blue and equally difficult pink, thereby winning the frame and thus the tournament by 10–9. In the emotional post-match interview, he described his win as his finest hour and dedicated it to his terminally ill father.

In 2011 the event returned to the Barbican Centre in York. There was a radical change to the format. All matches up to and including the quarter-finals were changed from the best of 17 frames to the best of 11 frames. In 2013 a 128-player flat draw was used, with all players starting in the first round and all rounds played at the Barbican venue. The tournament was contractually due to stay at the Barbican Centre until 2013, but it also hosted the event in 2014. That year the format was changed once again, with every round up to and including the semi-finals being played over best-of-11 frames. This is the format that is being used to the current day. This tournament saw yet another classic final, as Ronnie O'Sullivan won 10–9 over 2011 winner Judd Trump, who had recovered from 9–4 to take the match into a decider. Besides winning the title for a fifth time, O'Sullivan also produced a maximum in his last 16 match against Matthew Selt, the third consecutive 147 break in the main stages of the tournament since 2012, following the ones made by John Higgins in 2012 and Mark Selby in 2013, and followed by Neil Robertson's maximum in 2015 and Mark Allen's in 2016.

Between 2012 and 2018, the event has been won by either Neil Robertson, Mark Selby or Ronnie O'Sullivan. The final line-ups of 2013 and 2016 featured a combination of these three players, with Robertson defeating defending champion Selby in the former, and Selby beating O'Sullivan in the latter. In 2015, the final featured Australia's Neil Robertson and China's Liang Wenbo, the first time that a UK Championship final had been contested between two overseas players, an occurrence repeated in 2021, when Chinese player Zhao Xintong played against the Belgian Luca Brecel, who at that point was the first player from mainland Europe to compete in a Triple Crown final. This was the first ever UK Championship final between two players ranked outside the top 16. The 2016 final between Selby and O'Sullivan saw five century breaks in the final six frames of the match, as Selby won his second UK title. The next two editions of the tournament in 2017 and 2018 were captured by O'Sullivan, who became the first player since Stephen Hendry in 1996 to successfully defend the title. In addition, O'Sullivan set a new record for most UK titles with seven, that he would extend to eight in 2023 by beating Ding Junhui, who won the tournament for the third time in 2019, and was a runner-up to Mark Allen in 2022. In the 2020 edition of the event, it was Neil Robertson who became a three-time champion of the tournament, defeating Judd Trump 10–9 in a 7-hour long final with a 66-minute long decider frame.

== Winners ==
Year	Winner	Runner-up	Final score	Season	Venue
UK Championship (non-ranking, 1977–1983)
1977	Patsy Fagan (IRL)	Doug Mountjoy (WAL)	12–9	1977–78	Tower Circus in Blackpool
1978	Doug Mountjoy (WAL)	David Taylor (ENG)	15–9	1978–79	Preston Guild Hall in Preston
1979	John Virgo (ENG)	Terry Griffiths (WAL)	14–13	1979–80	Preston Guild Hall in Preston
1980	Steve Davis (ENG)	Alex Higgins (NIR)	16–6	1980–81	Preston Guild Hall in Preston
1981	Steve Davis (ENG)	Terry Griffiths (WAL)	16–3	1981–82	Preston Guild Hall in Preston
1982	Terry Griffiths (WAL)	Alex Higgins (NIR)	16–15	1982–83	Preston Guild Hall in Preston
1983	Alex Higgins (NIR)	Steve Davis (ENG)	16–15	1983–84	Preston Guild Hall in Preston
UK Championship (ranking, 1984–present)
1984	Steve Davis (ENG)	Alex Higgins (NIR)	16–8	1984–85	Preston Guild Hall in Preston
1985	Steve Davis (ENG)	Willie Thorne (ENG)	16–14	1985–86	Preston Guild Hall in Preston
1986	Steve Davis (ENG)	Neal Foulds (ENG)	16–7	1986–87	Preston Guild Hall in Preston
1987	Steve Davis (ENG)	Jimmy White (ENG)	16–14	1987–88	Preston Guild Hall in Preston
1988	Doug Mountjoy (WAL)	Stephen Hendry (SCO)	16–12	1988–89	Preston Guild Hall in Preston
1989	Stephen Hendry (SCO)	Steve Davis (ENG)	16–12	1989–90	Preston Guild Hall in Preston
1990	Stephen Hendry (SCO)	Steve Davis (ENG)	16–15	1990–91	Preston Guild Hall in Preston
1991	John Parrott (ENG)	Jimmy White (ENG)	16–13	1991–92	Preston Guild Hall in Preston
1992	Jimmy White (ENG)	John Parrott (ENG)	16–9	1992–93	Preston Guild Hall in Preston
1993	Ronnie O'Sullivan (ENG)	Stephen Hendry (SCO)	10–6	1993–94	Preston Guild Hall in Preston
1994	Stephen Hendry (SCO)	Ken Doherty (IRL)	10–5	1994–95	Preston Guild Hall in Preston
1995	Stephen Hendry (SCO)	Peter Ebdon (ENG)	10–3	1995–96	Preston Guild Hall in Preston
1996	Stephen Hendry (SCO)	John Higgins (SCO)	10–9	1996–97	Preston Guild Hall in Preston
1997	Ronnie O'Sullivan (ENG)	Stephen Hendry (SCO)	10–6	1997–98	Preston Guild Hall in Preston
1998	John Higgins (SCO)	Matthew Stevens (WAL)	10–6	1998–99	Bournemouth International Centre in Bournemouth
1999	Mark Williams (WAL)	Matthew Stevens (WAL)	10–8	1999–00	Bournemouth International Centre in Bournemouth
2000	John Higgins (SCO)	Mark Williams (WAL)	10–4	2000–01	Bournemouth International Centre in Bournemouth
2001	Ronnie O'Sullivan (ENG)	Ken Doherty (IRL)	10–1	2001–02	Barbican Centre in York
2002	Mark Williams (WAL)	Ken Doherty (IRL)	10–9	2002–03	Barbican Centre in York
2003	Matthew Stevens (WAL)	Stephen Hendry (SCO)	10–8	2003–04	Barbican Centre in York
2004	Stephen Maguire (SCO)	David Gray (ENG)	10–1	2004–05	Barbican Centre in York
2005	Ding Junhui (CHN)	Steve Davis (ENG)	10–6	2005–06	Barbican Centre in York
2006	Peter Ebdon (ENG)	Stephen Hendry (SCO)	10–6	2006–07	Barbican Centre in York
2007	Ronnie O'Sullivan (ENG)	Stephen Maguire (SCO)	10–2	2007–08	Telford International Centre in Telford
2008	Shaun Murphy (ENG)	Marco Fu (HKG)	10–9	2008–09	Telford International Centre in Telford
2009	Ding Junhui (CHN)	John Higgins (SCO)	10–8	2009–10	Telford International Centre in Telford
2010	John Higgins (SCO)	Mark Williams (WAL)	10–9	2010–11	Telford International Centre in Telford
2011	Judd Trump (ENG)	Mark Allen (NIR)	10–8	2011–12	Barbican Centre in York
2012	Mark Selby (ENG)	Shaun Murphy (ENG)	10–6	2012–13	Barbican Centre in York
2013	Neil Robertson (AUS)	Mark Selby (ENG)	10–7	2013–14	Barbican Centre in York
2014	Ronnie O'Sullivan (ENG)	Judd Trump (ENG)	10–9	2014–15	Barbican Centre in York
2015	Neil Robertson (AUS)	Liang Wenbo (CHN)	10–5	2015–16	Barbican Centre in York
2016	Mark Selby (ENG)	Ronnie O'Sullivan (ENG)	10–7	2016–17	Barbican Centre in York
2017	Ronnie O'Sullivan (ENG)	Shaun Murphy (ENG)	10–5	2017–18	Barbican Centre in York
2018	Ronnie O'Sullivan (ENG)	Mark Allen (NIR)	10–6	2018–19	Barbican Centre in York
2019	Ding Junhui (CHN)	Stephen Maguire (SCO)	10–6	2019–20	Barbican Centre in York
2020	Neil Robertson (AUS)	Judd Trump (ENG)	10–9	2020–21	Marshall Arena in Milton Keynes
2021	Zhao Xintong (CHN)	Luca Brecel (BEL)	10–5	2021–22	Barbican Centre in York
2022	Mark Allen (NIR)	Ding Junhui (CHN)	10–7	2022–23	Barbican Centre in York
2023	Ronnie O'Sullivan (ENG)	Ding Junhui (CHN)	10–7	2023–24	Barbican Centre in York
2024	Judd Trump (ENG)	Barry Hawkins (ENG)	10–8	2024–25	Barbican Centre in York
2025	Mark Selby (ENG)	Judd Trump (ENG)	10–8	2025–26	Barbican Centre in York
2026				2026–27	Barbican Centre in York

== Finalists ==
Name	Nationality	Winner	Runner-up	Finals
**Ronnie O'Sullivan**	England	8	1	9
Steve Davis	England	6	4	10
Stephen Hendry	Scotland	5	5	10
**John Higgins**	Scotland	3	2	5
**Ding Junhui**	China	3	2	5
**Mark Selby**	England	3	1	4
**Neil Robertson**	Australia	3	0	3
**Judd Trump**	England	2	3	5
**Mark Williams**	Wales	2	2	4
Doug Mountjoy	Wales	2	1	3
Alex Higgins	Northern Ireland	1	3	4
Terry Griffiths	Wales	1	2	3
**Jimmy White**	England	1	2	3
**Matthew Stevens**	Wales	1	2	3
**Shaun Murphy**	England	1	2	3
**Stephen Maguire**	Scotland	1	2	3
**Mark Allen**	Northern Ireland	1	2	3
John Parrott	England	1	1	2
Peter Ebdon	England	1	1	2
Patsy Fagan	Ireland	1	0	1
John Virgo	England	1	0	1
**Zhao Xintong**	China	1	0	1
Ken Doherty	Ireland	0	3	3
David Taylor	England	0	1	1
Willie Thorne	England	0	1	1
Neal Foulds	England	0	1	1
David Gray	England	0	1	1
**Marco Fu**	Hong Kong	0	1	1
Liang Wenbo	China	0	1	1
**Luca Brecel**	Belgium	0	1	1
**Barry Hawkins**	England	0	1	1

- Active players are shown in **bold**.

== Commercials ==
=== Title sponsorship ===
The UK Championship has had many different sponsors over the years, including Super Crystalate, Tennents, StormSeal, Royal Liver Assurance, Liverpool Victoria, PowerHouse, Travis Perkins, Maplin Electronics, Pukka Pies, 12BET.com, williamhill.com, Coral, Betway, Cazoo, MrQ, Victorian Plumbing and now by Leasing Options since 2026.

=== Television coverage ===
The BBC is the current rights holder along with the other Triple Crown events and shows the event alongside TNT Sports (previously Eurosport). The BBC covered the inaugural event in 1977 on Grandstand and has broadcast all subsequent tournaments. It is usually held towards the end of each calendar year.
