= Derby Assembly Rooms =

Theatre and multi-purpose venue in Derby, England

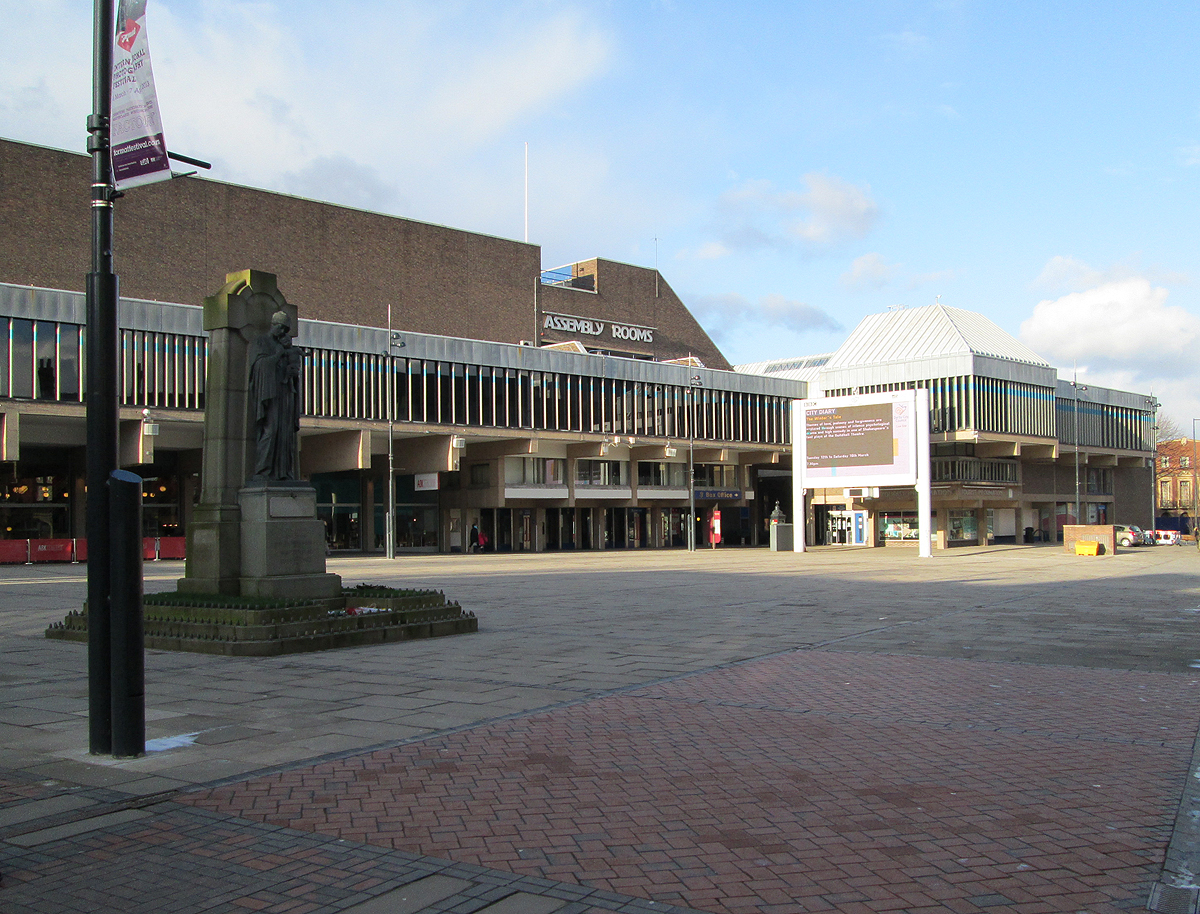
- Derby Assembly Rooms in 2013
- Interactive map of the Derby Assembly Rooms area

General information
- Status: Disused
- Architectural style: Brutalist
- Location: Derby, England
- Coordinates: 52.9237°N 1.4764°W
- Opening: 1977
- Closed: 2014
- Owner: Derby City Council

Design and construction
- Architect: Hugh Casson/Neville Conder

The Derby Assembly Rooms was an events venue in the English city of Derby. There have been three iterations of the Derby Assembly Rooms, with the last two on the same site. The first was opened in 1714 in Full Street, but soon proved inadequate. The second was built in 1763 on Market Place and was used until it was damaged by a fire in 1963. The third was built in 1977 and used until it too was damaged in a fire in 2014.

Both of the last two buildings still exist, at least in part. The façade of the 1763 building was dismantled and rebuilt as part of the vintage street scene at the National Tramway Museum in Crich, Derbyshire.

The 1977 building still stands, albeit unused since 2014, but has an uncertain future. As of March 2025, there were no firm plans and the adjacent car park was closed since 2024 in anticipation of demolition, but the council hope to have a better overview by the summer.

== The first Assembly Rooms ==
The first assembly rooms in Derby were opened in 1714 in Full Street. However, the premises used were rather small and not of particularly striking appearance, so it was not long before they were considered unsuitable for the assemblies. Later the building was converted into a permanent theatre, which became known as the Little Theatre in Full Street.

== The 1763 Assembly Rooms ==
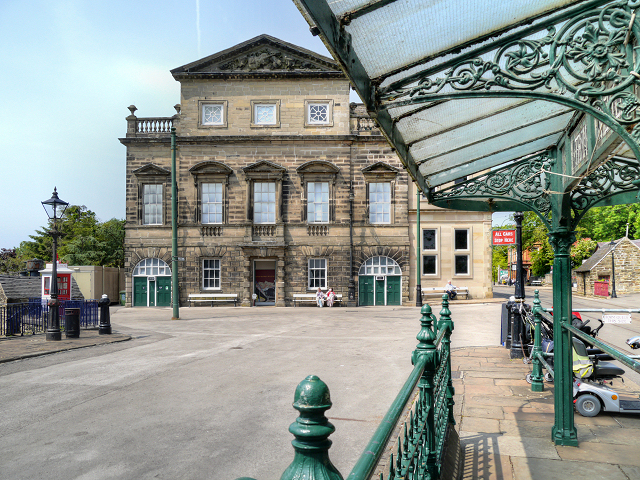
2013 view of the 1763 facade, re-erected at the National Tramway Museum

As a replacement for the first premises, the 1763 building was created by architect Joseph Pickford on a site gifted by the Duke of Devonshire and using funds raised by public subscription. It was managed by a board of trustees and contained various rooms, including a ballroom, with space for 400 people and a supper room. Usage involved balls, auctions, banquets, and private functions.

In the 1920s, Derby Corporation wanted to compulsorily purchase the Assembly Rooms, but this was opposed by the trustees. After negotiations, the building was acquired by the Corporation for £8167. It was agreed that the façade would be re-erected elsewhere, and that an alternative venue would be provided. Despite this agreement, the building remained standing and in use until it was damaged in a fire in 1963.

Because of the 40-year-old agreement, the façade was then dismantled and re-erected at the National Tramway Museum in the Derbyshire village of Crich, which is 18 kilometres (11 mi) north of its original site. Here a modern building behind the re-erected façade houses the museum's small-exhibits collection and library. The re-erected building was opened by the Duke of Gloucester in 1976.

== The 1977 Assembly Rooms ==
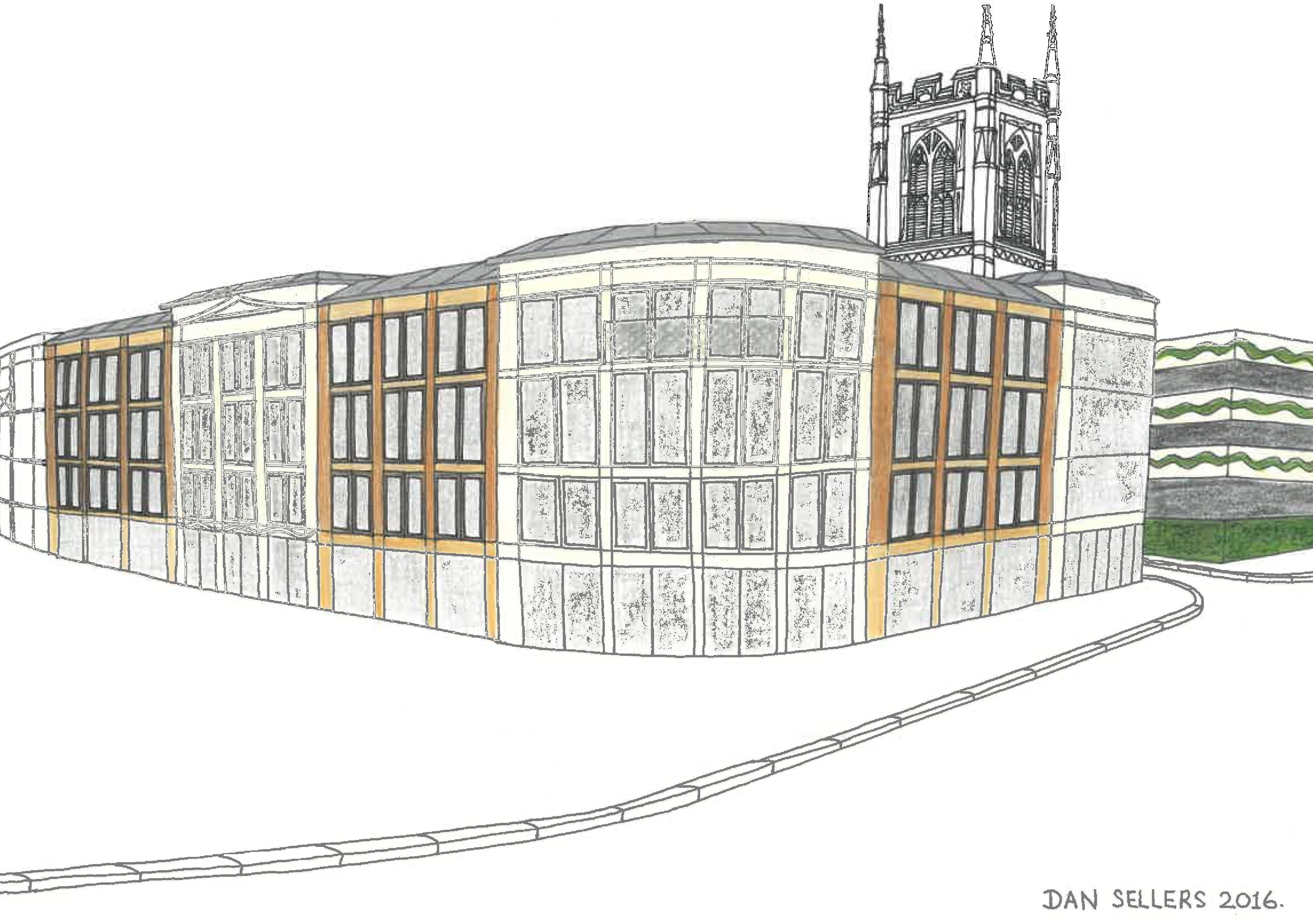
Study of suggested redevelopment of the site from 2016

The 1977 building was designed by Hugh Casson and Neville Conder in the brutalist style.

The venue has seen performances by Elton John, Iron Maiden, Judas Priest, Take That, the Manic Street Preachers, Tony Bennett and Frankie Laine. It is also notable as the original home of Bloodstock Festival which began there as a one-day indoor event.

The building has been closed since a 2014 fire in the plant room of an adjacent multi-storey car park damaged the Assembly Rooms' ventilation system. Historic England issued a Certificate of Immunity from Listing in April 2023, guaranteeing that the building would not be statutorily listed within the next five years.

In October 2023, a council-led investigation was announced into why the complex had lain unused for 10 years. A council leader commented that £20 million levelling up funding awarded from April 2023 was insufficient to cover demolition and replacement with a new theatre.

The Twentieth Century Society added the building to its Risk List of architecture at risk of being lost in 2021.
