= Mark Wildman =

English snooker player (1936–2024)

- Wildman with the UK Professional Billiards Championship trophy in 1983.
- Born: 25 January 1936; Peterborough, England
- Died: 18 November 2024 (aged 88); Utrera, Spain
- Sport country: England
- World Billiards Champion: 1984

Mark Wildman
Sport
- Sport: Snooker
- Professional: 1979–1991 (snooker)
- Highest ranking: 21 (1984–85)

Markham Wildman (25 January 1936 – 18 November 2024) was a billiards and snooker player and cue sports commentator from Peterborough, England. He won the World Professional Billiards Championship in 1984 and was runner up in 1980 and 1982. He made the first televised snooker century break in 1960, while still an amateur.

After a junior career in which he won titles in both snooker and English billiards, he won the 1963 Working Men's Club and Institute Union Championship, an event regarded as the second-most prestigious amateur title in the UK after the English Amateur Championship, by defeating John Dunning in the final. In 1968, he won the English Amateur Billiards Championship with a 2,652–2,540 victory against Clive Everton. In 1977, Wildman was runner-up to Michael Ferreira in a World Open Billiards Championship held in Christchurch. He was accepted as a professional player by the World Professional Billiards and Snooker Association (WPBSA) in 1979. His best run as a professional snooker player was reaching the semi-finals of the 1984 Lada Classic; in the rankings for the following year he attained his highest placing of 21st.

He reached the final of the 1980 World Professional Billiards Championship, finishing as runner-up to Fred Davis with a scoreline of 2,064–3,037. The 1983 UK Professional Billiards Championship was his first major title win as a professional, secured when he defeated Davis 1,500–1,032 in the final. During the semi-final, against Rex Williams, he recorded a break of 495, his highest. He won the World Billiards Championship title in 1984, narrowly defeating Eddie Charlton 1,045–1,012 in the five-hour final.

Throughout the 1980s and early 1990s, Wildman was a snooker commentator for ITV until snooker was dropped by the channel in 1993. He retired from professional snooker in 1991 but continued to play professional billiards for several years. He served as a WPBSA director, including as chairman from September 1999 to 4 December 2001.

== Biography ==
Markham Wildman was born on 25 January 1936 in Peterborough, England. He attended Deacon's School, Peterborough. Coached by his father Royce Wildman and by professional player John Barrie, he entered the 1950 British under-16 Billiards championship and lost 154–200 to Marcus Owen in the semi-finals. He won the championship the following year by defeating John Burgess 400–355 in the final.

He was the British under-19 winner in 1952 and 1953. He was also the 1952 British Boys Champion in snooker and British Junior snooker champion in 1954. In 1954 he entered the English Amateur Snooker Championship for the first time, but was eliminated 0–3 by Ron Gross. The next year he lost in the first round and in 1956 he was beaten again by Gross, this time 4–5 in the home counties area final. In 1960, he compiled the first televised snooker century break.

Over the next few years he failed to make an impact in the main English Amateur Snooker Championship; a 1963 profile in Billiards and Snooker magazine commended his potting and positional play but suggested that he could be "erratic" and impatient. That year, he won the Working Men's Club and Institute Union Championship, regarded as the second-most prestigious amateur title in the UK after the English Amateur Championship, with a 318–268 aggregate points victory in a five-frame contest against John Dunning.

In 1968, he won the English Amateur Billiards Championship by defeating Clive Everton 2,652–2,540 in the final. At the World Amateur Billiards Championship the following year, he finished joint fifth of eleven participants. Billiards and Snooker magazine editor Everton wrote that Wildman "produced some brilliant if unorthodox" play, but "lacked the consistency and a final degree of assurance" on some shots.

In 1977, Wildman was runner-up to Michael Ferreira in a World Open Billiards Championship held in Christchurch. In the semi-final, Wildman had eliminated Barrie, who described his former student as "a spasmodic, opportunist sort of player, very unpredictable but always dangerous." Wildman applied to become a professional player in 1979 and was initially rejected by the World Professional Billiards and Snooker Association (WPBSA), before being accepted later that year.

== Professional billiards career ==
He reached the final of the 1980 World Professional Billiards Championship by defeating Bernard Bennett, Rex Williams and Ray Edmonds, and was runner-up to Fred Davis with a scoreline of 2,064–3,037. In the 1982 World Billiards Championship, he was runner-up to Williams.

The 1983 UK Professional Billiards Championship was his first major title win as a professional, secured when he defeated Davis 1,500–1,032 in the final. During the semi-final, against Williams, he recorded a break of 495, his highest.

He won the World Billiards Championship title in 1984, narrowly defeating Charlton 1,045–1,012 in the five-hour final. Wildman had eliminated Paddy Morgan 1,347–759 and Ian Williamson 1,501–859 to reach the final. Halfway through the match against Charlton, Wildman led 599–508. With eight minutes left to play, Charlton came to the table 87 behind, but after taking more than a minute to play a single shot during a break of 54, he ran out of time. It was the closest result in the final since William Cook defeated John Roberts Jr. by 15 points in 1871.

In 1985, the Blue Arrow Masters became the first Billiards tournament since the 1950s to be televised in the UK. Wildman was one of six contestants, along with Williams, Fred Davis, Charlton, Ray Reardon and Alex Higgins, in a competition played over games where each player's time was limited to 15 minutes. Wildman was runner-up to Williams. His attempt to defend the world title in 1985 when the format switched to a best-of-five games of first-to-400 saw him beat Tony Jones and Peter Francisco both 3–0 before Edmonds defeated him 3–0 in the semi-finals. He again lost in the semi-finals in 1986, 1–3 to Robby Foldvari.

The UK Championship was not held from 1984 to 1986. Wildman was drawn to meet Graham Miles, who withdrew, then defeated Bob Close 3–1 before losing 3–0 to Edmonds in the semi-finals.

== Professional snooker career ==
In his first match in a professional ranking tournament, he lost 7–9 to Frank Jonik in the qualifying competition for the 1980 World Snooker Championship. During the 1980-81 snooker season he won two matches at the 1980 UK Championship but was then eliminated by Fred Davis. He lost his first qualifying match for the 1981 World Snooker Championship 3–9 to Ray Edmonds. In 1981–82 he won two of five matches he played, but did not qualify for the main stage of any of the three tournaments he participated in.

In the following season, his reaching the last 16 of the 1982 Professional Players snooker tournament meant that he qualified for the 1983 Masters. Although his first four shots in his first-round match were all foul, he led Steve Davis 2–1 before losing 2–5. He qualified for the main competition of the 1983 World Snooker Championship where he lost 8–10 to Terry Griffiths, having led 8–7.

The 1983–84 season saw him defeat three top-16 players, John Virgo, Silvino Francisco and Charlton, to reach the semi-finals of the 1984 Lada Classic, where he was eliminated 3–5 by Tony Meo, It was the furthest he reached in a professional snooker tournament. He also qualified for the main stages of the 1983 International Open, the 1983 Professional Players Tournament and the 1983 UK Championship during the season. Although he lost against Roy Andrewartha in the deciding frame of his first qualifying match for the 1984 World Snooker Championship, his performances over the preceding three seasons ranked him 21st in the 1984–85 snooker world rankings, the highest placing he would attain during his career.

He did not reach as far as the quarter-finals of a major tournament again. Edmonds defeated him in qualifying for both the 1985 and 1986 world championships, and after defeating Foldvari in the second qualifying 1987 edition, he was beaten 0–10 by Jon Wright in the third qualifying round. Foldvari eliminated him in the qualifying competition for 1988, as did Francois Ellis in 1989 and Eddie Sinclair in 1990. In his final season as a snooker professional he lost to Derek Heaton in the first qualifying round for the 1991 Classic and then defeated Everton 5–3 in the 1991 British Open before losing to Bob Harris in the second qualifying round for that tournament.

== Non-playing career and death ==
Following his national service in the Royal Air Force, Wildman worked in finance and was later an area manager for United Dominions Trust.

Wildman retired from professional snooker in 1991, but continued to play professional billiards for several years. Sports statistician Ian Morrison wrote in 1987 that inconsistency was Wildman's main weakness as a player, perhaps due to his divided focus between his business career and cue sports. Wildman lacked confidence in his snooker abilities up to the early 1980s, but over time as he saw other players making mistakes in matches he was commentating on, he became more confident. The Observer journalist Janice Hale had described Wildman in 1985 as "an absent minded figure who always seems to have forgotten something".

Throughout the 1980s and early 1990s, Wildman was a snooker commentator for ITV until snooker was dropped by the channel in 1993. During the 1990s and 2000s, he also commented for Screensport, Sky Sports and Eurosport.

He was a WPBSA director for two consecutive terms from 1984 to 1997. From September 1999 to 4 December 2001 he served as WPBSA chairman, then had a further term on the board from 17 December 2001 until September 2002. He was appointed chairman of the WPBSA's Billiards Committee when it was inaugurated and he successfully obtained sponsorship for tournaments internationally. The snooker historian Everton, who had first met Wildman when they were competitors in junior championships and served on the WPBSA billiards committee alongside him, wrote that Wildman "brought considerable initiative, imagination and energy" to the role and that "his contribution to the game has never been fully appreciated".

He coached future snooker world champion Shaun Murphy after they met in the early 1990s and also coached such billiards players as Roxton Chapman, Matthew Sutton, Phil Welham and Karen Corr. After his active involvement in professional cue sports ended, Wildman moved to Spain, where he became a local champion of carom billiards. He was taken ill on 24 December 2020, and moved into residential care in Utrera, where he remained until his death on 18 November 2024, at the age of 88. Murphy remarked that "the knowledge [Wildman] gave me was second to none" and another former world champion, Ken Doherty, paid tribute to the quality of Wildman's commentary. WPBSA chairman Jason Ferguson said that he had been inspired by Wildman's "great vision for the global development of our sport". Marcus Stead, editor of Snooker Scene magazine, wrote that Wildman "had a reputation as a savvy businessman and a shrewd operator. But he was also a man of great charm, personal kindness, an impeccable manners".

== Career finals ==
=== Junior tournaments ===
Junior finals
Outcome	Date	Championship	Opponent in the final	Score	Ref.
Winner	1952	British Boys' Billiards Championship	John Burgess (WAL)	400–355	
Winner	1952	British Boys' Snooker Championship	Dennis Breeze (ENG)	3–0	
Winner	1953	British Junior Billiards Championship	Emlyn Parry (WAL)	529–520	
Winner	1953	British Junior Snooker Championship	Emlyn Parry (WAL)	4–2	
Winner	1954	British Junior Billiards Championship	Donald Scott (ENG)	582–497	

=== English billiards ===
Amateur English billiards finals
Outcome	Date	Championship	Opponent in the final	Score	Ref.
Winner	1968	English Amateur Billiards Championship	Clive Everton (WAL)	2,652–2,540	
Runner-up	1969	English Amateur Billiards Championship	Jack Karnehm (ENG)	2,881–3,722	
Runner-up	1977	Leopard International Billiards	John Barrie (ENG)	Round-robin	
Runner-up	1977	World Open Billiards Championship	Michael Ferreira (IND)	1,309–3,461	

Professional English billiards finals
Outcome	Date	Championship	Opponent in the final	Score	Ref.
Runner-up	November 1980	World Billiards Championship	Fred Davis (ENG)	2,064–3,037	
Runner-up	1982	World Billiards Championship	Rex Williams (ENG)	1,785–3,000	
Winner	1983	UK Professional Billiards Championship	Fred Davis (ENG)	1,500–1,032	
Winner	1984	World Billiards Championship	Eddie Charlton (AUS)	1,045–1,012	
Runner-up	1985	Blue Arrow Masters	Rex Williams (ENG)	1–2 (Note: Game score where each player was limited to 15 minutes playing time.)	

=== Snooker ===
Amateur snooker finals
Outcome	No.	Date	Championship	Opponent in the final	Score	Ref.
Winner	1	1963	Working Men's Club and Institute Union Championship	John Dunning (ENG)	318–268 (Note: Aggregate points score over five frames.)	
Winner	2	1977	Leopard International Snooker	John Barrie (ENG)	4–3	
