= 1985 British Open =

Snooker tournament

1985 Dulux British Open
Tournament information
- Dates: 17 February – 3 March 1985
- Venue: Assembly Rooms
- City: Derby
- Country: England
- Organisation: WPBSA
- Format: Ranking event
- Total prize fund: £250,000
- Winner's share: £50,000
- Highest break: Alex Higgins (NIR) (142)

Final
- Champion: Silvino Francisco (RSA)
- Runner-up: Kirk Stevens (CAN)
- Score: 12–9

The 1985 British Open (officially the 1985 Dulux British Open) was a professional ranking snooker tournament, that was held from 17 February to 3 March 1985 with television coverage on ITV beginning on 22 February from the Assembly Rooms in Derby, England. It was the first edition of the British Open, having been rebranded from the International Masters the previous year. It was the fifth ranking event of the 1984–85 snooker season, preceding the 1985 World Snooker Championship.

In the best-of-23-frames final, South African player Silvino Francisco defeated Canadian Kirk Stevens 12–9. It was the first major professional snooker tournament without a British player in the final. The event featured a total prize fund of £250,000 with the winner receiving £50,000. The highest break of the event was made by Alex Higgins, who compiled a 142 in his last-16 match against Cliff Thorburn.

== Overview ==
The 1985 British Open was held between 17 February and 3 March 1985. The qualifying competition took place across venues in London, Bristol and Stockport. The first round took place at the Connaught Club in London and the Bradbury Hall in Chesterfield between 14 and 17 January 1985, whilst the remaining rounds took place at the Assembly Rooms, Derby. The qualifying and first rounds were played as best-of-11 frames. The following rounds, from last 32 to quarter-finals, were played as shorter best-of-9-frames matches because of television scheduling. Broadcaster ITV were concerned about the prospect of large overtime payments for their staff if matches overran, and also requested that the afternoon matches started at 2:00 pm rather than the originally scheduled 1:00 pm, to avoid higher payments to lighting technicians that would have been due if the lighting was switched on before that time. The decision by snooker governing body the World Professional Billiards and Snooker Association (WPBSA) to cut the length of matches in response to ITV's request was publicly criticised by WPBSA board member Barry Hearn, who was also the manager of prominent player Steve Davis.

The event was sponsored by ICI Paints Division and was known for sponsorship purposes as the 1985 Dulux British Open. It took the place of the non-ranking 1984 International Masters tournament on the professional snooker calendar.

=== Prize fund ===
The prize fund for the event was £250,000, with the winner receiving £50,000.

- Winner: £50,000
- Runner-up: £30,000
- Semi-finals: £17,500
- Quarter-finals: £9,000
- Last 16: £4,625
- Last 32: £2,000
- Last 64: £750
- Highest break (televised stages): £5,000 Alex Higgins (142)
- Highest break (pre-televised stages): £5,000 Steve Davis (129)
- Total: £250,000

== Tournament summary ==
In the first round, Bill Werbeniuk, 14th in the world rankings, was beaten 1–6 by Bob Chaperon. Malcolm Bradley, in his first season as a professional player, beat David Taylor 6–3. Bob Harris, who to that point had made little impact as a player, beat world number six Eddie Charlton 6–3 after being 1–3 behind. Jimmy White was 3–1 ahead of Tony Jones but the match went to the deciding frame before White won, 6–5. Another first-year professional, Danny Fowler, beat Rex Williams, the former world billiards champion, 6–3. A third new professional, Tony Chappel, led reigning world champion Steve Davis 5–4, before Davis prevailed 6–5.

The television stages of the event began in the second round. Steve Newbury, in his first season as a professional player, recorded a 5–3 win over former world champion Terry Griffiths in the last 32. Other players unexpectedly losing in the second round were Willie Thorne, who lost 0–5 to Murdo MacLeod; Ray Reardon, who was wearing spectacles for the first time in a match and who was beaten 4–5 by Dave Martin after leading 4–1; and Jimmy White, who lost 4–5 to Silvino Francisco. Only seven of the top sixteen seeded players progressed into the last 16 of the competition. In the last 16, Alex Higgins was level at 2–2 with Cliff Thorburn, then made a total clearance of 142, the highest break of the tournament, and went on to win 5–2. In the match between Eugene Hughes and Murdo MacLeod, neither player made a break of 30 or over as Hughes won 5–2.

Kirk Stevens won his quarter-final against Dennis Taylor by winning five straight frames after trailing 0–2, and went on to beat Davis 9–7 in the semi-final to reach his first ranking tournament final. In the other semi-final, Francisco was never behind Higgins in frames, and won 9–7. With the South African Francisco and the Canadian Stevens contesting the final, it was the first snooker ranking tournament where there was no British player in the final. The next time there was a ranking final with no British players was the 2009 Grand Prix.

Francisco beat Stevens 12–9 in the final to win the title. The final was played across three sessions, with an afternoon and evening session on Saturday 2 March followed by a session on Sunday 3 March. Francisco took a 5–0 lead in the final, before Stevens won the last two frames of the first session to make it 5–2. In the second session, Francisco increased his lead to 6–2 with a fluke on the pink ball in the eighth frame. A few frames later, he made his lead 9–4 due to another fluked pink ball. In the frame following this, Stevens compiled the highest break of the final, 108, which left Francisco 9–5 ahead at the end of the first day. The following day, Stevens took the first three frames of the third session of the final to trail by just one frame. However, Francisco won the next two frames to lead 11–8. Stevens won frame 20 from 47 points behind, but Francisco took the next to gain victory. The winner's prize money of £50,000 was a new record amount for snooker tournaments. The final attracted an average of 11.2 million viewers on ITV, peaking at 15.5 million. It was Francisco's only ranking tournament win as well as Stevens' only ranking final.

== Main draw ==
The main draw for the tournament was held with a total of 64 participants. Players listed in bold denote match winners.

First round (Last 64); Best of 11 frames
**Steve Davis (ENG)** | **6**
Tony Chappel (WAL) | 5
**John Virgo (ENG)** | **6**
Peter Francisco (RSA) | 2
Rex Williams (ENG) | 4
**Danny Fowler (ENG)** | **6**
David Taylor (ENG) | 3
**Malcolm Bradley (ENG)** | **6**
John Campbell (AUS) | 4
**Dene O'Kane (NZL)** | **6**
Doug Mountjoy (WAL) | 5
**Vic Harris (ENG)** | **6**
**Ray Reardon (WAL)** | **6**
Warren King (AUS) | 5
**Dave Martin (ENG)** | **6**
Bernard Bennett (ENG) | 0
**Dennis Taylor (NIR)** | **6**
George Scott (ENG) | 2
**John Parrott (ENG)** | **6**
John Rea (SCO) | 4
**Terry Griffiths (WAL)** | **6**
Dave Chalmers (ENG) | 0
**Steve Newbury (WAL)** | **6**
Eddie Sinclair (SCO) | 3
**Kirk Stevens (CAN)** | **6**
Marcel Gauvreau (CAN) | 3
**Mark Wildman (ENG)** | **6**
Matt Gibson (SCO) | 1
**John Spencer (ENG)** | **6**
Frank Jonik (CAN) | 0
**Graham Miles (ENG)** | **6**
Ray Edmonds (ENG) | 1
**Tony Meo (ENG)** | **6**
Robby Foldvari (AUS) | 0
**Mike Hallett (ENG)** | **w/o**
Bernie Mikkelsen (CAN) | w/d
**Tony Knowles (ENG)** | **6**
Doug French (ENG) | 2
Cliff Wilson (WAL) | 3
**Steve Longworth (ENG)** | **6**
**Jimmy White (ENG)** | **6**
Tony Jones (ENG) | 5
**Silvino Francisco (RSA)** | **6**
Tony Kearney (IRL) | 4
Bill Werbeniuk (CAN) | 1
**Bob Chaperon (CAN)** | **6**
Joe Johnson (ENG) | 5
**Wayne Jones (WAL)** | **6**
**Eugene Hughes (IRL)** | **6**
Paul Watchorn (IRL) | 4
Eddie Charlton (AUS) | 3
**Bob Harris (ENG)** | **6**
**Willie Thorne (ENG)** | **6**
Bill Oliver (ENG) | 3
**Murdo MacLeod (SCO)** | **6**
Tommy Murphy (NIR) | 5
**Cliff Thorburn (CAN)** | **6**
Gino Rigitano (CAN) | 3
**Dean Reynolds (ENG)** | **6**
James Giannaros (AUS) | 3
**Neal Foulds (ENG)** | **6**
John Hargreaves (ENG) | 1
**Alex Higgins (NIR)** | **6**
Roger Bales (ENG) | 3

Second round (Last 32); Best of 9 frames
(England) **Steve Davis** | **5**
(England) John Virgo | 2
(England) Danny Fowler | 4
(England) **Malcolm Bradley** | **5**
(New Zealand) **Dene O'Kane** | **5**
(England) Vic Harris | 3
(Wales) Ray Reardon | 4
(England) **Dave Martin** | **5**
(Northern Ireland) **Dennis Taylor** | **5**
(England) John Parrott | 2
(Wales) Terry Griffiths | 3
(Wales) **Steve Newbury** | **5**
(Canada) **Kirk Stevens** | **5**
(England) Mark Wildman | 2
(England) John Spencer | 3
(England) **Graham Miles** | **5**
(England) **Tony Meo** | **5**
(England) Mike Hallett | 4
(England) **Tony Knowles** | **5**
(England) Steve Longworth | 2
(England) Jimmy White | 4
(South Africa) **Silvino Francisco** | **5**
(Canada) **Bob Chaperon** | **5**
(Wales) Wayne Jones | 2
(Republic of Ireland) **Eugene Hughes** | **5**
(England) Bob Harris | 4
(England) Willie Thorne | 0
(Scotland) **Murdo MacLeod** | **5**
(Canada) **Cliff Thorburn** | **5**
(England) Dean Reynolds | 3
(England) Neal Foulds | 1
(England) **Alex Higgins** | **5**

Third round (Last 16); Best of 9 frames
(England) **Steve Davis** | **5**
(England) Malcolm Bradley | 2
(New Zealand) **Dene O'Kane** | **5**
(England) Dave Martin | 4
(Northern Ireland) **Dennis Taylor** | **5**
(Wales) Steve Newbury | 3
(Canada) **Kirk Stevens** | **5**
(England) Graham Miles | 2
(England) **Tony Meo** | **5**
(England) Tony Knowles | 2
(South Africa) **Silvino Francisco** | **5**
(Canada) Bob Chaperon | 2
(Republic of Ireland) **Eugene Hughes** | **5**
(Scotland) Murdo MacLeod | 2
(Canada) Cliff Thorburn | 2
(Northern Ireland) **Alex Higgins** | **5**

Quarter-finals; Best of 9 frames
(England) **Steve Davis** | **5**
(New Zealand) Dene O'Kane | 1
(Northern Ireland) Dennis Taylor | 2
(Canada) **Kirk Stevens** | **5**
(England) Tony Meo | 4
(South Africa) **Silvino Francisco** | **5**
(Republic of Ireland) Eugene Hughes | 2
(Northern Ireland) **Alex Higgins** | **5**

Semi-finals; Best of 17 frames
(England) Steve Davis | 7
(Canada) **Kirk Stevens** | **9**
(South Africa) **Silvino Francisco** | **9**
(Northern Ireland) Alex Higgins | 6

Final; Best of 23 frames
(Canada) Kirk Stevens | 9
(South Africa) **Silvino Francisco** | **12**

=== Final ===
Final: Best of 23 frames. Referee: Vic Bartlam; Assembly Rooms, Derby, England. 2 and 3 March 1985.
| **Silvino Francisco**; South Africa | **12**–9 | Kirk Stevens; Canada |
Afternoon: **73**–51, **88**–6 (65), **58**–46, **63**–2 (57), **74**–29 (52), 52–**71** (60), 23–**76**, Evening: **61**–50, 13–**73**, **81**–4, **64**–43, 12–**80**, **64**–52, 5–**108** (108); Afternoon: 18–**79**, 31–**77** (62), 54–**63**, **58**–11, **79**–40, 54–**74**, **64**–14
| 65 | Highest break | **108** |
| 0 | Century breaks | **1** |
| **3** | 50+ breaks | **3** |

== Qualifying ==
Qualifying matches were played as best-of-11-frames matches. Players in bold denote match winners.

| Player 1 | Score | Player 2 |
|---|---|---|
| **(Wales) Tony Chappel** | **6**–5 | (England) Ian Williamson |
| (England) **Dave Chalmers** | **6**–5 | (Republic of Ireland) Pascal Burke |
| (Scotland) **John Rea** | **6**–0 | (England) Mick Fisher |
| (Australia) **Warren King** | **6**–4 | (England) Paul Medati |
| (England) **Danny Fowler** | **6**–1 | (Wales) Clive Everton |
| (Northern Ireland) **Tommy Murphy** | **6**–3 | (Republic of Ireland) Dessie Sheehan |
| (Australia) **Robby Foldvari** | **6**–4 | (England) Steve Duggan |
| (England) **Vic Harris** | **6**–1 | (England) Les Dodd |
| (England) **Tony Jones** | **6**–0 | (England) Geoff Foulds |
| (South Africa) **Peter Francisco** | **6**–3 | (Republic of Ireland) Billy Kelly |
| (New Zealand) **Dene O'Kane** | **6**–4 | (England) Graham Cripsey |
| (Wales) **Steve Newbury** | **6**–0 | (Republic of Ireland) Paddy Browne |
| (England) **Malcolm Bradley** | **6**–2 | (Canada) Mario Morra |
| (Republic of Ireland) **Tony Kearney** | **6**–4 | (England) Mike Watterson |
| (England) **Doug French** | **6**–0 | (Scotland) Eddie McLaughlin |
| (Canada) **Bob Chaperon** | **6**–5 | (Republic of Ireland) Patsy Fagan |
| (England) **Bob Harris** | **6**–1 | (England) Jim Meadowcroft |
| (England) **Steve Longworth** | **6**–1 | (England) Fred Davis |
| (Canada) **Bernie Mikkelsen** | **6**–0 | (England) Dennis Hughes |
| (England) **George Scott** | **6**–3 | (England) Mike Darrington |
| (Australia) **James Giannaros** | **6**–1 | (Wales) Colin Roscoe |
| (Canada) **Frank Jonik** | **6**–2 | (Northern Ireland) Jack McLaughlin |
| (Wales) **Wayne Jones** | **6**–1 | (Scotland) Jim Donnelly |
| (Republic of Ireland) **Paul Watchorn** | **6**–1 | (England) Jack Fitzmaurice |
| (England) **Roger Bales** | **6**–4 | (Scotland) Ian Black |
| (Canada) **Marcel Gauvreau** | **6**–3 | (England) David Greaves |
| (Scotland) **Matt Gibson** | **6**–1 | (Scotland) Bert Demarco |
| (England) **Ray Edmonds** | **6**–1 | (South Africa) Derek Mienie |
