= 1981 UK Championship =

1981 Coral UK Championship
Tournament information
- Dates: 22 November – 5 December 1981
- Venue: Preston Guild Hall
- City: Preston
- Country: England
- Organisation: WPBSA
- Format: Non-ranking event
- Total prize fund: £40,000
- Winner's share: £10,000
- Highest break: (Wales) Terry Griffiths (131)

Final
- Champion: (England) Steve Davis
- Runner-up: (Wales) Terry Griffiths
- Score: 16–3

The 1981 UK Championship (officially the 1981 Coral UK Championship) was a professional non-ranking snooker tournament that took place at the Guild Hall in Preston, England, between 22 November and 5 December 1981. This was the fifth edition of the UK Championship, the fourth staging of the competition in Preston, and the fourth consecutive UK Championship to be sponsored by Coral. The televised stages were shown on the BBC from the quarter-finals on 28 November through to the end of the championship.

== Tournament summary ==
- Steve Davis retained the first of his major titles by defeating Terry Griffiths 16–3 in the final.
- Jimmy White, fresh from his success in the Langs Scottish Masters and Northern Ireland Classic, which took place earlier in the season, beat Clive Everton, John Virgo, Dennis Taylor and Ray Reardon, in reaching the semi-finals at his first attempt, but then was whitewashed 0–9 by the reigning World and UK Champion Steve Davis.
- Two other young players, Tony Knowles and Tony Meo, also enhanced their reputations: Knowles by beating Fred Davis and Doug Mountjoy in reaching the quarter-finals, and Meo by defeating Rex Williams, Cliff Thorburn and Alex Higgins in reaching the semi-finals.

== Main draw ==
Last 24; Best of 17 frames
(England) Willie Thorne	9
(England) Ray Edmonds	4
(Canada) Kirk Stevens	9
(England) Mike Hallett	4
(England) Jimmy White	9
(England) John Virgo	6
(England) Joe Johnson	9
(England) John Spencer	5
(England) Graham Miles	9
(England) Pat Houlihan	5
(England) Tony Knowles	9
(England) Fred Davis	6
(Northern Ireland) Alex Higgins	9
(England) Dave Martin	4
(England) Tony Meo	9
(England) Rex Williams	8

Last 16; Best of 17 frames
(England) Steve Davis	9
(England) Willie Thorne	2
(Canada) Bill Werbeniuk	9
(Canada) Kirk Stevens	7
(Northern Ireland) Dennis Taylor	5
(England) Jimmy White	9
(Wales) Ray Reardon	9
(England) Joe Johnson	7
(Wales) Terry Griffiths	9
(England) Graham Miles	4
(Wales) Doug Mountjoy	6
(England) Tony Knowles	9
(England) David Taylor	5
(Northern Ireland) Alex Higgins	9
(Canada) Cliff Thorburn	6
(England) Tony Meo	9

Quarter-finals; Best of 17 frames
(England) Steve Davis	9
(Canada) Bill Werbeniuk	5
(England) Jimmy White	9
(Wales) Ray Reardon	8
(Wales) Terry Griffiths	9
(England) Tony Knowles	5
(Northern Ireland) Alex Higgins	4
(England) Tony Meo	9

Semi-finals; Best of 17 frames
(England) Steve Davis	9
(England) Jimmy White	0
(Wales) Terry Griffiths	9
(England) Tony Meo	3

Final; Best of 31 frames
(England) Steve Davis	16
(Wales) Terry Griffiths	3

== Final ==
Final: Best of 31 frames. Referee: The Guild Hall, Preston, England, 4 and 5 December 1981.
Steve Davis; England	16–3	Terry Griffiths; Wales
First session: 28–60, 102–13 (87), 74–12, 76–24, 72–1 (65), 69–20, 75–45 (63); Second session: 84–37 (58), 116–1 (56), 73–62 (54), 0–127 (96), 111–8, 64–44, 57–32, 27–77 (77); Third session: 90–22, 113–9 (52), 81–26 (59), 54–37
87	Highest break	96
0	Century breaks	0
8	50+ breaks	2

== Qualifying ==
Best of 17 frames

Winner	Score	Competitor
Group 1
(England) Paul Medati	9–6	(Scotland) Eddie McLaughlin
(England) Paul Medati	9–7	(Scotland) Jim Donnelly
Group 2
(England) Mike Hallett	9–4	(England) Vic Harris
(England) Mike Hallett	9–6	(England) Dennis Hughes
Group 3
(Scotland) Matt Gibson	9–6	(England) Jack Fitzmaurice
(Wales) Clive Everton	9–6	(Scotland) Matt Gibson
Group 4
(England) Joe Johnson	9–6	(Northern Ireland) Tommy Murphy
(England) Mike Watterson	9–4	(England) Bernard Bennett
(England) Joe Johnson	9–3	(England) Mike Watterson

Winner	Score	Competitor
Group 5
(England) Pat Houlihan	9–1	(England) Kingsley Kennerley
(England) Pat Houlihan	9–4	(Scotland) Ian Black
Group 6
(England) Geoff Foulds	9–7	(England) Billy Kelly
Group 7
(Scotland) Eddie Sinclair	9–6	(England) Mark Wildman
(Scotland) Eddie Sinclair	9–0	(England) Sid Hood
Group 8
(England) Rex Williams	9–3	(England) Doug French
(Wales) Colin Roscoe	9–7	(Scotland) Murdo MacLeod
(England) Rex Williams	9–4	(Wales) Colin Roscoe

Winner	Score	Competitor
Round of 32 Best of 17 frames.
(England) Willie Thorne	9–6	(England) Paul Medati
(England) Mike Hallett	9–5	(Republic of Ireland) Patsy Fagan
(England) Jimmy White	9–4	(Wales) Clive Everton
(England) Joe Johnson	9–5	(Wales) Cliff Wilson
(England) Pat Houlihan	9–4	(England) Jim Meadowcroft
(England) Tony Knowles	9–1	(England) Geoff Foulds
(England) Dave Martin	9–7	(Scotland) Eddie Sinclair
(England) Rex Williams	9–4	(England) John Dunning

== Century breaks ==
- 131 – Terry Griffiths
- 126 – Willie Thorne
- 120, 105 – Steve Davis
- 120 – Alex Higgins
- 120 – Kirk Stevens
- 107 – Tony Meo
- 103 – Rex Williams
- 102 – Tony Knowles
