= 1976 World Snooker Championship =

1976 Embassy World Snooker Championship
Tournament information
- Dates: 7–23 April 1976
- Venue: Middlesbrough Town Hall; Wythenshawe Forum
- City: Middlesbrough; Manchester
- Country: England
- Organisation: WPBSA
- Format: Ranking event
- Total prize fund: £15,300
- Winner's share: £6,000
- Highest break: John Spencer (ENG) (138)

Final
- Champion: Ray Reardon (WAL)
- Runner-up: Alex Higgins (NIR)
- Score: 27–16

The 1976 World Snooker Championship (officially known as the 1976 Embassy World Snooker Championship) was a professional ranking snooker tournament that took place at two venues, Middlesbrough Town Hall, and Wythenshawe Forum, Manchester, from 7 to 23 April 1976. Qualifying matches were played at the Prince of Wales Hotel, Southport, and at the Park House Hotel, Blackpool from 29 March to 2 April. The tournament was promoted by Maurice Hayes's company Q Promotions on behalf of the World Professional Billiards and Snooker Association. The winner received £6,000 from a total prize fund of £15,300.

The winner of the title was Ray Reardon, who defeated Alex Higgins 27–16 in the final at Wythenshawe Forum, to claim his fifth World Championship. Reardon was the defending champion, having won 31–30 against Eddie Charlton in the 1975 final. During the 1976 final, Reardon made several complaints about the environment, which was adjusted to accommodate him. Charlton had complained earlier about a table, which was found to be non-standard, invalidating his break of 137.

There were seven century breaks in the championship, the highest of which was 138 by John Spencer. It was the last World Championship before the Crucible Theatre in Sheffield became the regular venue. For the first time, the tournament was sponsored by the cigarette company Embassy; the relationship endured for 30 years.

== Overview ==
The World Snooker Championship is the preeminent tournament in professional snooker. Joe Davis won the first World Championship in 1927, organised by the Billiards Association and Control Council, the final match being held at Camkin's Hall in Birmingham, England. Staged annually until 1940, the tournament was put on hiatus during World War II and went into decline in the post-war era; the 1952 World Snooker Championship was contested by only two players and was replaced by the World Professional Match-play Championship, which was also discontinued in 1957. The title was contested on an occasional challenge basis until 1969, when the World Championship reverted to a knockout tournament format.

The 1976 championship featured sixteen professional players competing in one-on-one snooker matches in a single-elimination format, each match played over several frames. These competitors in the main tournament were selected using a combination of the top players based on results from the three previous years and the winners of a pre-tournament qualification stage. The tournament was promoted by Maurice Hayes's company Q Promotions on behalf of the World Professional Billiards and Snooker Association. The defending champion was Ray Reardon, who had defeated Eddie Charlton 31–30 in the 1975 final to win his fourth title.

There were 27 entrants for the 1976 tournament. In addition to Reardon, several former champions entered. Multiple-time champions Fred Davis and John Pulman had first entered in 1937 and 1947 respectively. John Spencer (1969 and 1971) and Alex Higgins (1972) were the only players to have won the tournament since 1969 apart from Reardon. The draw for the tournament was due to be televised on the BBC Television current affairs programme Nationwide, with recorded footage of three players as part of the segment. Although Higgins was at the Lime Grove Studios as planned, Spencer said that he was unaware that he was expected to be at the Manchester studios, and Dennis Taylor was playing in a tournament in Portsmouth, so could not attend the Birmingham studio. Graham Miles was appointed as a substitute for Taylor, but got stuck in traffic and abandoned his journey when he realised he would not arrive on time. The draw was not televised; WPBSA officials met actress Glenda Jackson at Lime Grove by chance, and she agreed to make the draw. The main tournament matches were held at either Middlesbrough Town Hall or at the Wythenshawe Forum, Manchester.

The tournament was sponsored by tobacco company W.D. & H.O. Wills, using their Embassy brand. As part of the arrangement, they also sponsored a Women's Open tournament, an international amateur tournament, and an open tournament for players in the UK. Embassy's sponsorship of the world championship, which followed an approach by Hayes, endured for the next 30 years. It was the last world championship before the Crucible Theatre in Sheffield became the regular venue.

=== Prize fund ===
The winner of the event received £6,000 from a total prize fund of £15,300. The planned breakdown of prize money for the event is shown below, but it was later decided that there would not be a playoff for third and fourth place.

- Winner: £6,000
- Runner-up: £2,000
- Third Place: £1,200
- Fourth Place: £1,100
- Quarter-finalists: £600
- Last 16: £300
- Highest break: £200

== Tournament summary ==
=== Qualifying ===
One group of qualifying matches was played at the Prince of Wales Hotel, Southport. The other group took place at the Park House Hotel, Blackpool. At both venues, first round matches were played on 29 and 30 March 1976, the second round matches on 31 March and 1 April, and a final on 2 April. All matches were the best of 15 frames. At Blackpool, veteran Jackie Rea, who had made his tournament debut in 1949, eliminated Ian Anderson 8–5, and then saw off Bernard Bennett by the same score. He lost in the deciding frame to David Taylor in a match that determined a qualifier for the main event. Taylor had previously accounted for David Greaves 8–1; Greaves had previously defeated Jim Charlton 8–5.

The qualifying place from the Southport section was taken by Jim Meadowcroft, who won 8–5 against Willie Thorne. In the first qualifying round, Ron Gross defeated Maurice Parkin 8–5, Lou Condo eliminated Marcus Owen 8–6 and Dennis Wheelwright won only a single frame against Meadowcroft. In the next round, Gross led Meadowcoft 4–3 but lost 4–8, and Thorne won 8–3 against Condo.

=== Main tournament ===
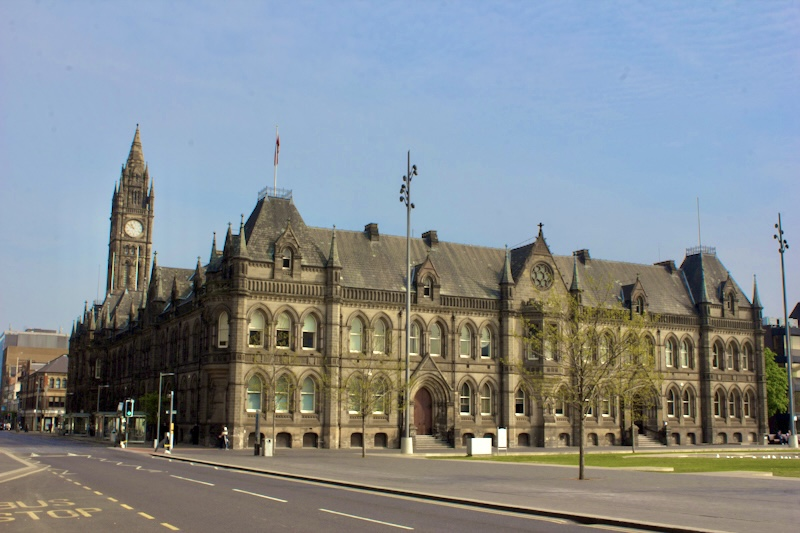
Middlesbrough Town Hall (pictured in 2011) was the venue for the matches in the top half of the main draw.

The leading 14 players in the Order of Merit, a ranking based on performances in the preceding three world championships, received automatic entry to the final stages and were joined by two winners from the qualifying competition. The leading eight players in the Order of Merit were seeded. The top half of the draw was played at Middlesbrough Town Hall from 10 to 16 April, and the bottom hal was staged as Wythenshawe Forum from 11 to 19 April. The final was held over 4 days, from 20 to 23 April, at Wythenshawe Forum. There were two session of play each day, at 2:00 pm and at 7:30 pm.

=== First round ===
First round matches were played from 10 to 13 April at Middlesbrough, and from 11 to 14 April at Manchester, as the best of 29 frames. Defending champion Ray Reardon won 15–7 against John Dunning and made a break of 106. Reardon won all but one of the last 14 frames. After a complaint by Reardon about distractions, spectators were barred from bringing drinks into the arena and from lighting cigarettes when the competitors were in the process of making their shot. Gary Owen lost 9–15 to Dennis Taylor. It was Owen's last appearance at the world championship. Snooker historian Clive Everton later wrote that Owen "seemed to have lost all heart for the game" and was a lesser player than in the days when he had won two World Amateur Snooker Championships.

Spencer took a 12–1 lead against David Taylor and won 15–5, finishing the match with a 138 break in the 20th frame. After two sessions, Cliff Thorburn led Higgins 8–6, but he lost the first four frames in the next session and, going into the concluding session, the pair were tied at 10–10. Thorburn held a lead at 13–13 and 14–13, but Higgins won the 28th frame to take the match to a deciding frame, which Higgins won after breaks of 33 and 32.

A quarter-final between two of the unseeded players was set as Meadowcroft won five of the next six frames after leading Williams 9–5; and Miles lost 10–15 to Perrie Mans. According to article in The Times, Williams "struggled all through" his match. Davis held a 15–7 lead against Bill Werbeniuk, but lost the first four frames of their concluding session before going three frames clear at 14–11. The match went to a deciding frame, which was won by Davis.

Having been 1–3 and 4–5 behind Pulman, Charlton took four of the last five frames on the first day. Charlton made a break of 137 in the penultimate frame, but, following his criticism of the snooker table, officials measured the size of the pockets and found that five of the six were too large, meaning that his break was not recognised.

=== Quarter-finals ===
The quarter-finals were played from 14 to 15 April at Middlesbrough, and from 15 to 16 April at Manchester, as the best of 29 frames. Reardon led Taylor 7–0, and was 12–2 after two sessions, and won 15–2. He compiled a break of 115 in the last frame. Meadowcroft praised Mans's potting as "fantastic" Mans constructed a 9–5 lead and won 15–8. The 1972 finalists Spencer and Higgins were level at 7–7 after their first two sessions. Higgins had the better of the third session and finished it 11–9 up. He was one frame from victory at 14–12, but Spencer took the next two frames to force a deciding frame; it was won by Higgins. Charlton led Davis 5–1, 8–7 and 11–9 at the close of their first three sessions. They were level at 13–13, before Charlton added the next two frames for victory.

=== Semi-finals ===
The semi-finals were played from 16 to 18 April at Middlesbrough, and from 17 to 19 April at Manchester, as the best of 39 frames. Mans was known to be a skilled potter and safety exponent, but lacked position play; he had made only two breaks of 50 or more in reaching the semi-finals. According to Everton, Mans's "limitations were drastically exposed", as Reardon took the first session 4–2 and went on to win 20–10 with a top break of 133. After the match, Mans accepted Reardon's offer of a 30-minute session of advice about shot selection.

All but one of the six frames in first session of the match between Higgins and Charlton went to Higgins, and he finished the first day leading 8–5. By the close of day two, Higgins was 14–12 ahead, having made a break of 121 in the 22nd frame. Charlton was only one frame behind at 16–17. but Higgins took the next two frames, and Charlton took the two after that. Higgins won 20–18, to progress to his first world championship final since his victory in 1972.

=== Final ===
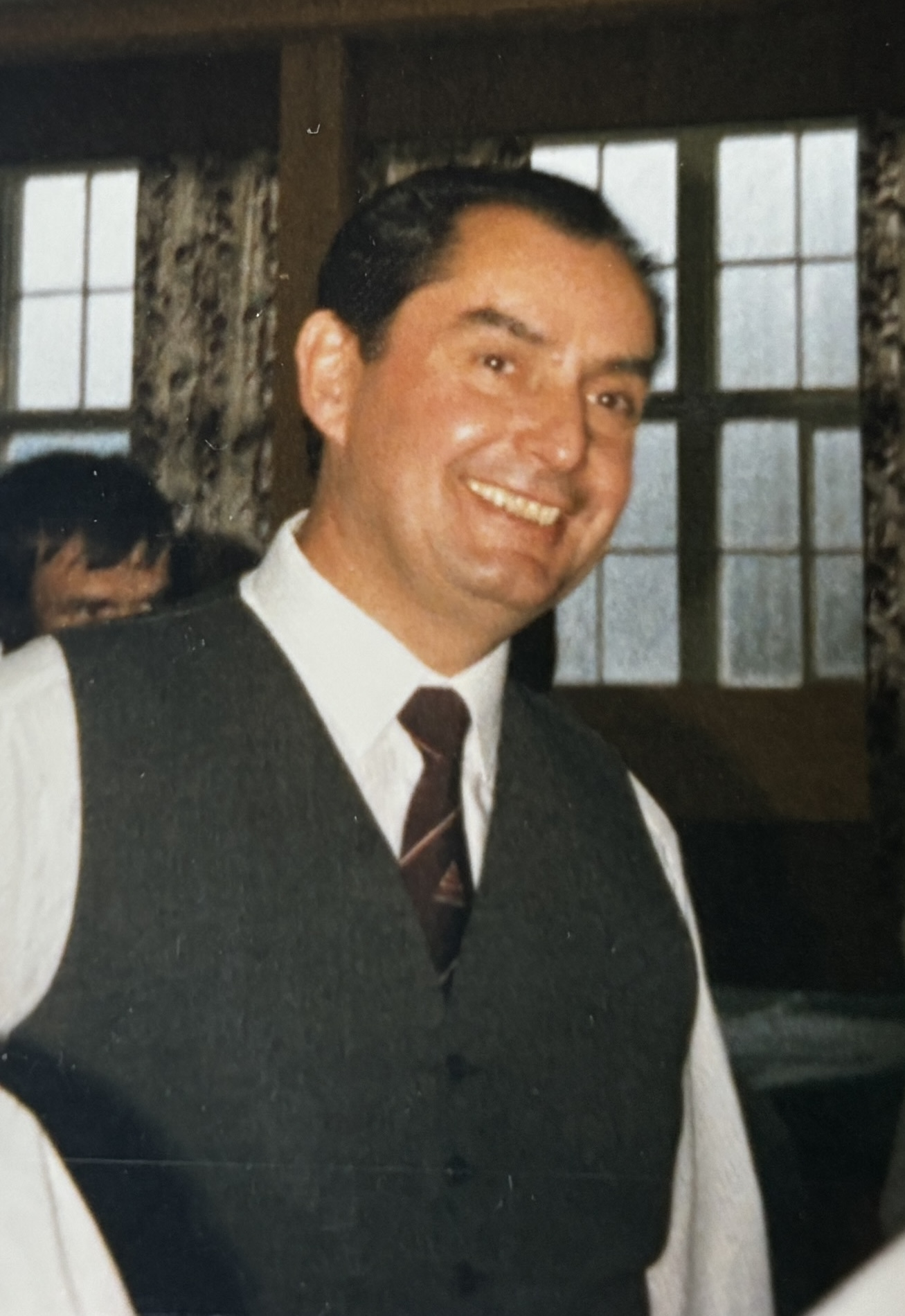
Ray Reardon (pictured circa 1983) won the title.

The final was played as the best of 53 frames from 20 to 23 April at Wythenshawe Forum, meaning that Reardon had travelled to where Higgins had been playing. Higgins had the better of the earlier exchanges, and led 4–2 after the first session. After the session, Reardon complained to the organisers that he could not see the balls properly due to the bright lighting that had been installed for television, and the lighting levels were reduced. He won five successive frames during the second session, and led 8–5 after the first day. Reardon complained about the quality of the snooker table during the afternoon session on the second day. Everton endorsed Reardon's complaints about the table, later detailing how it was extremely difficult to pot balls along one side cushion, while balls were holding close to the opposite cushion, and the ball did not rebound off cushions as expected. Higgins had taken a one frame lead at 10–9 before the table was attended to by fitters during the interval.

Reardon took six of the seven evening frames for 15–11 lead going into the last day. During the evening session, referee Bill Timms declared that Higgins had failed to hit the object ball after being snookered by Reardon. Higgins told Timms that "I'll have to accept it, but you're wrong." Reardon, by exercising his right to have Higgins play the next shot rather than accept a free ball, demonstrated his agreement with Higgins rather than with the referee. With both players making playing errors, Reardon played tactically and won five successive frames, the last with a break of 87, to lead 15–11 after two days.

Higgins won the first two frames of the fifth session, but Reardon took the next three for 18–13. In the 29th frame, Reardon recovered from 68 points behind to take the frame. He won the 31st frame after needing snookers. In frame 32, with Reardon well ahead on points, Timms awarded Higgins a free ball, a decision disputed by Reardon. Reardon won that frame to increase his lead to 19–13, but complained about Timms's refereeing to the organisers. It was subsequently announced that Timms was ill, and John Williams would referee the rest of the final. With Higgins conceding several frames while there were still red balls on the table during the sixth session, Reardon ended the third day leading 24–15. Reardon won three of the first frames on the fourth morning to secure his fifth title victory at 27–16, with a session to spare. Writing in The Guardian, Everton felt that Reardon "won without ever displaying his most dominating form", and that he "looks in a class of his own and there is no obvious successor in sight. Similarly, The Times report of the final session concluded that "Reardon looked a class above the rest." Part of the final was shown on BBC Television.

=== Aftermath ===
The Sponsored Events Manager for W.D. & H.O. Wills, Peter Dyke, commented that it had been an "interesting and rewarding involvement" and said that the company would be interested in maintaining an involvement with snooker. However, he complained that the promoter, Hayes, had declined to tell the company details of income from gate receipts and other sources. Hayes's company Q Promotions went out of business shortly afterwards; it had been beset by problems including confusion over bookings for professionals it managed, including Higgins, which led several snooker clubs to pursue costs from the company. Mike Watterson, whose first sporting promotion had been a match between Higgins and Reardon in 1972, subsequently became the promoter for the 1977 Championship. Sports historian Ian Morrison wrote that following the "near disaster" of 1976 for the sponsors, "Watterson convinced them that he could make the championships work, and the following year he proved himself correct." A similar account is provided by Everton: "Pessimists feared that Embassy would pull out of snooker forthwith. They stayed because there was the prospect of more television coverage and better promotion ... Watterson promoted the championship with an efficiency and flair it had never previously experienced."

== Main draw ==
Numbers in parentheses indicate seeding. Winning players are denoted in bold.

**Last 16**; Best of 29 frames
**Ray Reardon (WAL) (1)**	**15**
John Dunning (ENG)	7
Gary Owen (WAL) (8)	9
**Dennis Taylor (NIR)**	**15**
Graham Miles (ENG) (5)	10
**Perrie Mans (RSA)**	**15**
Rex Williams (ENG) (4)	7
**Jim Meadowcroft (ENG)**	**15**
**Alex Higgins (NIR) (3)**	**15**
Cliff Thorburn (CAN)	14
**John Spencer (ENG) (6)**	**15**
David Taylor (ENG)	5
**Fred Davis (ENG) (7)**	**15**
Bill Werbeniuk (CAN)	12
**Eddie Charlton (AUS) (2)**	**15**
John Pulman (ENG)	9

**Quarter-finals**; Best of 29 frames
(Wales) **Ray Reardon (1)**	**15**
(Northern Ireland) Dennis Taylor	2
(South Africa) **Perrie Mans**	**15**
(England) Jim Meadowcroft	8
(Northern Ireland) **Alex Higgins (3)**	**15**
(England) John Spencer (6)	14
(England) Fred Davis (7)	13
(Australia) **Eddie Charlton (2)**	**15**

**Semi-finals**; Best of 39 frames
(Wales) **Ray Reardon (1)**	**20**
(South Africa) Perrie Mans	10
(Northern Ireland) **Alex Higgins (3)**	**20**
(Australia) Eddie Charlton (2)	18

**Final**; Best of 53 frames
(Wales) **Ray Reardon (1)**	**27**
(Northern Ireland) Alex Higgins (3)	16

== Qualifying ==
Results of the qualifying competition are shown below. Winning players are denoted in bold.

Round 1 (Best of 15 frames)
Player	Score	Player	Venue
**Jim Meadowcroft (ENG)**	**8**–1	Dennis Wheelwright (AUS)	Prince of Wales Hotel, Southport
**Ron Gross (ENG)**	**8**–5	Maurice Parkin (ENG)	Prince of Wales Hotel, Southport
**Lou Condo (AUS)**	**8**–6	Marcus Owen (WAL)	Prince of Wales Hotel, Southport
**David Greaves (ENG)**	**8**–5	Jim Charlton (AUS)	Park House Hotel, Blackpool
**Jackie Rea (NIR)**	**8**–5	Ian Anderson (AUS)	Park House Hotel, Blackpool

Round 2 (Best of 15 frames)
Player	Score	Player	Venue
**Jim Meadowcroft (ENG)**	**8**–4	Ron Gross (ENG)	Prince of Wales Hotel, Southport
**Willie Thorne (ENG)**	**8**–3	Lou Condo (AUS)	Prince of Wales Hotel, Southport
**David Taylor (ENG)**	**8**–1	David Greaves (ENG)	Park House Hotel, Blackpool
**Jackie Rea (NIR)**	**8**–5	Bernard Bennett (ENG)	Park House Hotel, Blackpool

Round 3 (Best of 15 frames)
Player	Score	Player	Venue
**Jim Meadowcroft (ENG)**	**8**–5	Willie Thorne (ENG)	Prince of Wales Hotel, Southport
**David Taylor (ENG)**	**8**–7	Jackie Rea (NIR)	Park House Hotel, Blackpool

== Century breaks ==
The following century breaks were made at the tournament. The highest break of the tournament was 138 made by Spencer in his match against Taylor.

- 138 – John Spencer
- 137*, 129 – Eddie Charlton
- 133, 115, 106 – Ray Reardon
- 121 – Alex Higgins

* Not officially recognised, because five of the six pockets were found to be oversized.

== Associated tournaments ==
Of the other events sponsored by Embassy as part of their deal, Vera Selby won the Women's Open, which is now regarded as the first edition of the World Women's Snooker Championship. She defeated Muriel Hazeldene 4–1 in the final, and won £500 and a wristwatch worth £500. Each snooker club in the UK was able to nominate two entrants for the Embassy International. The matches were played over a single frame. Dennis Hughes was awarded the £500 winner's prize after defeating Colin Myers by 99 points to 14 in the final. John Virgo took £500 for winning the invitational Embassy International Amateur Tournament, the results of which are shown below.

=== Embassy International Amateur Tournament main draw ===
All matches were the best of seven frames. Winning players are denoted in bold.

**Last 16**
**Patsy Fagan (IRE)**	**4**
Eddie Sinclair (SCO)	2
**Doug Mountjoy (WAL)**	**4**
J. Clint (NIR)	0
**John Virgo (ENG)**	**4**
S. McMahon (NIR)	0
**Roy Andrewartha (ENG)**	**4**
F. Nathan (IRE)	3
**Colin Roscoe (WAL)**	**4**
Pascal Burke (IRE)	3
**Sid Hood (ENG)**	**4**
John Phillips (ENG)	0
**Jack Fitzmaurice (ENG)**	**4**
Terry Griffiths (WAL)	3
**John Hargreaves (ENG)**	**4**
Ray Edmonds (ENG)	3

**Quarter-finals**
Patsy Fagan (IRE)	1
**Doug Mountjoy (WAL)**	**4**
**John Virgo (ENG)**	**4**
Roy Andrewartha (ENG)	1
Colin Roscoe (WAL)	1
**Sid Hood (ENG)**	**4**
**Jack Fitzmaurice (ENG)**	**4**
John Hargreaves (ENG)	3

**Semi-finals**
Doug Mountjoy (WAL)	3
**John Virgo (ENG)**	**4**
**Sid Hood (ENG)**	**4**
Jack Fitzmaurice (ENG)	2

**Final**
**John Virgo (ENG)**	**4**
Sid Hood (ENG)	1
