= 1981–82 snooker season =

Details
- Duration: 25 June 1981 – 29 May 1982
- Tournaments: 19 (1 ranking event)

Triple Crown winners
- UK Championship: (England) Steve Davis
- Masters: (England) Steve Davis
- World Championship: (Northern Ireland) Alex Higgins

The 1981–82 snooker season was a series of snooker tournaments played between 25 June 1981 and 29 May 1982. The following table outlines the results for ranking events and the invitational events.

== New professional players ==
In January 1981, the World Professional Billiards and Snooker Association (WPBSA) accepted Eugene Hughes, Mike Watterson, Paul Medati, Jack Fitzmaurice and Dessie Sheehan were accepted. Billy Kelly and Mick Fisher applied but were rejected.

In April 1981, a further thirteen players turned professional: Ian Black, Bert Demarco, Jim Donnelly, Clive Everton, Geoff Foulds, Doug French, Matt Gibson, Vic Harris, Dennis Hughes, Billy Kelly, Eddie McLaughlin, Murdo MacLeod and Colin Roscoe, were accepted, but Williamson and Tony Graham were not.

Dean Reynolds, Gary Johnston, and John Phillips were accepted in the September intake, when four players, including Paul Watchorn and Tony Kearney, were unsuccessful with their applications.

== Calendar ==
Date (Note: Dates use the mm-dd date format.)			Rank	Tournament name	Venue	City	Winner	Runner-up	Score	Reference
06-25	06-27	AUS	NR	Australian Masters	Channel 10 Television Studios	Sydney	(England) Tony Meo	(England) John Spencer	(Note: The final was decided on aggregate score over three frames.)	
09–14	09–20	ENG	NR	International Open	Assembly Rooms	Derby	(England) Steve Davis	(Northern Ireland) Dennis Taylor	9–0	
09–22	09–25	SCO	NR	Scottish Masters	Kelvin Hall	Glasgow	(England) Jimmy White	(Canada) Cliff Thorburn	9–4	
10–24	11–01	ENG	TE	World Team Classic	Hexagon Theatre	Reading	England	Wales	4–3	
11–03	11–07	NIR	NR	Northern Ireland Classic	Ulster Hall	Belfast	(England) Jimmy White	(England) Steve Davis	11–9	
11–22	12–05	ENG	NR	UK Championship	Guild Hall	Preston	(England) Steve Davis	(Wales) Terry Griffiths	16–3	
12–28	12–31	ENG	NR	Pot Black	BBC Studios	Birmingham	(England) Steve Davis	(Australia) Eddie Charlton	2–0	
01–10	01–13	ENG	NR	The Classic	Civic Centre	Oldham	(Wales) Terry Griffiths	(England) Steve Davis	9–8	
01–26	01–31	ENG	NR	The Masters	Wembley Conference Centre	London	(England) Steve Davis	(Wales) Terry Griffiths	9–5	
02–22	02–24	ENG	NR	Tolly Cobbold Classic	Corn Exchange	Ipswich	(England) Steve Davis	(Northern Ireland) Dennis Taylor	8–3	
02–24	02–28	WAL	NR	Welsh Professional Championship	Ebbw Vale Leisure Centre	Ebbw Vale	(Wales) Doug Mountjoy	(Wales) Terry Griffiths	9–8	
03–01	03–07	ENG	NR	International Masters	Assembly Rooms	Derby	(England) Steve Davis	(Wales) Terry Griffiths	9–7	
03–05	03–07	SCO	NR	Scottish Professional Championship	Glen Pavilion	Dunfermline	(Scotland) Eddie Sinclair	(Scotland) Ian Black	11–7	
03–09	03–13	NIR	NR	Irish Professional Championship	Riverside Theatre	Coleraine	(Northern Ireland) Dennis Taylor	(Northern Ireland) Alex Higgins	16–13	
03–23	03–28	IRL	NR	Irish Masters	Goff's	Kill	(Wales) Terry Griffiths	(England) Steve Davis	9–5	
04–16	04–18	SCO	NR	Highland Masters	Eden Court Theatre	Inverness	(Wales) Ray Reardon	(England) John Spencer	11–4	
04–30	05–16	ENG	WR	World Snooker Championship	Crucible Theatre	Sheffield	(Northern Ireland) Alex Higgins	(Wales) Ray Reardon	18–15	
05–22	05–28	WAL	NR	Pontins Professional	Pontins	Prestatyn	(England) Steve Davis	(Wales) Ray Reardon	9–4	
05–29		ENG	NR	Bass and Golden Leisure Classic	Liverpool Centre	Liverpool	(England) Rex Williams	(England) Ray Edmonds	4–1	

WR = World ranking event
NR = Non-ranking event
TE = Team event

== Official rankings ==
The top 16 of the world rankings, these players automatically played in the final rounds of the World Snooker Championship and were invited for the Masters.

No.	Ch.	Name
1	▲	(Canada) Cliff Thorburn
2	▲	(England) Steve Davis
3	▲	(Wales) Terry Griffiths
4	▼	(Wales) Ray Reardon
5	▲	(Northern Ireland) Dennis Taylor
6	▲	(Wales) Doug Mountjoy
7	▲	(England) David Taylor
8	▼	(Australia) Eddie Charlton
9	▲	(Canada) Bill Werbeniuk
10	▲	(Canada) Kirk Stevens
11	▼	(Northern Ireland) Alex Higgins
12	▼	(England) Fred Davis
13	▼	(England) John Virgo
14	▲	(England) John Spencer
15	▼	(South Africa) Perrie Mans
16	Steady	(England) Graham Miles
