= 1984 International Masters =

1984 Yamaha International Masters
Tournament information
- Dates: 27 February – 4 March 1984
- Venue: Assembly Rooms
- City: Derby
- Country: England
- Organisation: WPBSA
- Format: Non-ranking event
- Total prize fund: £63,000
- Winner's share: £12,000
- Highest break: (Canada) Kirk Stevens (107)

Final
- Champion: (England) Steve Davis
- Runner-up: (England) Dave Martin (England) John Dunning (3rd)

The 1984 International Masters (officially the 1984 Yamaha International Masters) was a non-ranking snooker tournament, that was held between 27 February to 4 March 1984 at the Assembly Rooms in Derby, England.

== Main draw ==
=== Group 1 ===
| Player 1 | Score | Player 2 | Date |
|---|---|---|---|
| (Wales) Ray Reardon | 2–0 | (Canada) Mario Morra | |
| (Wales) Ray Reardon | 2–0 | (England) Mike Darrington | |
| (Canada) Mario Morra | 2–1 | (England) Mike Darrington | |

=== Group 2 ===
| Player 1 | Score | Player 2 | Date |
|---|---|---|---|
| (England) John Virgo | 2–0 | (England) Paul Medati | |
| (Australia) Eddie Charlton | 1–2 | (England) Paul Medati | |
| (Australia) Eddie Charlton | 2–0 | (England) John Virgo | |

=== Group 3 ===
| Player 1 | Score | Player 2 | Date |
|---|---|---|---|
| (England) David Taylor | 2–0 | (Australia) Paddy Morgan | |
| (England) Dave Martin | 2–0 | (England) David Taylor | |
| (England) Dave Martin | 2–0 | (Australia) Paddy Morgan | |

=== Group 4 ===
| Player 1 | Score | Player 2 | Date |
|---|---|---|---|
| (England) Jimmy White | 2–0 | (Scotland) Eddie Sinclair | |
| (Wales) Terry Griffiths | 2–1 | (England) Jimmy White | |
| (Wales) Terry Griffiths | 2–0 | (Scotland) Eddie Sinclair | |

=== Group 5 ===
| Player 1 | Score | Player 2 | Date |
|---|---|---|---|
| (Northern Ireland) Alex Higgins | 1–2 | (Australia) Warren King | |
| (Australia) Warren King | 2–1 | (England) Jack Fitzmaurice | |
| (Northern Ireland) Alex Higgins | 2–0 | (England) Jack Fitzmaurice | |

=== Group 6 ===
| Player 1 | Score | Player 2 | Date |
|---|---|---|---|
| (England) Tony Knowles | 2–0 | (England) Les Dodd | |
| (England) Tony Knowles | 1–2 | (England) John Dunning | |
| (England) John Dunning | 2–0 | (England) Les Dodd | |

=== Group 7 ===
| Player 1 | Score | Player 2 | Date |
|---|---|---|---|
| (Wales) Doug Mountjoy | 2–0 | (Republic of Ireland) Billy Kelly | |
| (England) Steve Davis | 2–0 | (Wales) Doug Mountjoy | |
| (England) Steve Davis | 2–0 | (Republic of Ireland) Billy Kelly | |

=== Group 8 ===
| Player 1 | Score | Player 2 | Date |
|---|---|---|---|
| (England) Willie Thorne | 2–1 | (England) Mike Watterson | |
| (England) Willie Thorne | 2–1 | (Canada) Kirk Stevens | |
| (Canada) Kirk Stevens | 2–1 | (England) Mike Watterson | |

=== Group 9 ===
| Player 1 | Score | Player 2 | Date |
|---|---|---|---|
| (Canada) Bill Werbeniuk | 2–0 | (England) Neal Foulds | |
| (Canada) Bill Werbeniuk | 0–2 | (England) Doug French | |
| (England) Neal Foulds | 2–1 | (England) Doug French | |

=== Semi-final group 1 ===
| Player 1 | Score | Player 2 | Date |
|---|---|---|---|
| (Australia) Eddie Charlton | 1–2 | (England) Dave Martin | |
| (Wales) Ray Reardon | 0–2 | (England) Dave Martin | |
| (Wales) Ray Reardon | 0–2 | (Australia) Eddie Charlton | |

=== Semi-final group 2 ===
| Player 1 | Score | Player 2 | Date |
|---|---|---|---|
| (Australia) Warren King | 2–1 | (England) John Dunning | |
| (Wales) Terry Griffiths | 2–1 | (Australia) Warren King | |
| (Wales) Terry Griffiths | 1–2 | (England) John Dunning | |

=== Semi-final group 3 ===
| Player 1 | Score | Player 2 | Date |
|---|---|---|---|
| (England) Willie Thorne | 2–0 | (England) Doug French | |
| (England) Steve Davis | 2–1 | (England) Willie Thorne | |
| (England) Steve Davis | 2–0 | (England) Doug French | |

=== Final Group ===
Match 1:. Referee: Assembly Rooms, Derby, England. 4 March 1984.
| Dave Martin; England | 3–2 | John Dunning; England |
64–36, 61–40, 41–73, 77–30 (64), 51–56
| 64 | Highest break | |
| 0 | Century breaks | 0 |
| 1 | 50+ breaks | 0 |

Match 2:. Referee: Assembly Rooms, Derby, England. 4 March 1984.
| Steve Davis; England | 4–1 | John Dunning; England |
38–90 (70), 92–14 (66), 71–38, 90–20, 98–35 (70)
| 70 | Highest break | 70 |
| 0 | Century breaks | 0 |
| 2 | 50+ breaks | 1 |

Match 3:. Referee: Assembly Rooms, Derby, England. 4 March 1984.
| Steve Davis; England | 3–0 | Dave Martin; England |
98–4 (72), 77–57, 86–1 (57)
| 72 | Highest break | |
| 0 | Century breaks | 0 |
| 2 | 50+ breaks | 0 |

== Qualifying ==
Group 1

| Player 1 | Score | Player 2 | Date |
|---|---|---|---|
| (Wales) Doug Mountjoy | 2–1 | (Northern Ireland) Tommy Murphy | |

Group 2

| Player 1 | Score | Player 2 | Date |
|---|---|---|---|
| (England) Mark Wildman | 2–0 | (Scotland) Jim Donnelly | |
| (England) Mark Wildman | 0–2 | (Canada) Mario Morra | |
| (Canada) Mario Morra | 2–0 | (Scotland) Jim Donnelly | |

Group 3

| Player 1 | Score | Player 2 | Date |
|---|---|---|---|
| (Australia) Paddy Morgan | 0–2 | (Wales) Clive Everton | |
| (England) Tony Meo | 0–2 | (Australia) Paddy Morgan | |
| (England) Tony Meo | 2–0 | (Wales) Clive Everton | |

Group 4

| Player 1 | Score | Player 2 | Date |
|---|---|---|---|
| (England) Graham Miles | 1–2 | (England) Paul Medati | |

Group 5

| Player 1 | Score | Player 2 | Date |
|---|---|---|---|
| (Scotland) Murdo MacLeod | 1–2 | (England) Mike Watterson | |
| (England) Geoff Foulds | 0–2 | (England) Mike Watterson | |
| (Scotland) Murdo MacLeod | 2–0 | (England) Geoff Foulds | |

Group 6

| Player 1 | Score | Player 2 | Date |
|---|---|---|---|
| (England) Jim Meadowcroft | 1–2 | (England) Ian Williamson | |
| (England) Jim Meadowcroft | 1–2 | (Republic of Ireland) Billy Kelly | |
| (England) Ian Williamson | 0–2 | (Republic of Ireland) Billy Kelly | |

Group 7

| Player 1 | Score | Player 2 | Date |
|---|---|---|---|
| (England) Jimmy White | 2–0 | (Canada) Frank Jonik | |
| (England) Jimmy White | 2–0 | (Canada) Gino Rigitano | |
| (Canada) Frank Jonik | 2–0 | (Canada) Gino Rigitano | |

Group 8

| Player 1 | Score | Player 2 | Date |
|---|---|---|---|
| (England) Willie Thorne | 2–0 | (England) Tony Jones | |
| (England) Willie Thorne | 2–0 | (Republic of Ireland) Eugene Hughes | |
| (Republic of Ireland) Eugene Hughes | 0–2 | (England) Tony Jones | |

Group 9

| Player 1 | Score | Player 2 | Date |
|---|---|---|---|
| (England) Joe Johnson | 0–2 | (Wales) Colin Roscoe | |
| (England) Doug French | 2–0 | (Wales) Colin Roscoe | |
| (England) Joe Johnson | 0–2 | (England) Doug French | |

Group 10

| Player 1 | Score | Player 2 | Date |
|---|---|---|---|
| (Northern Ireland) Dennis Taylor | 0–2 | (England) George Scott | |
| (England) George Scott | 0–2 | (England) Neal Foulds | |
| (Northern Ireland) Dennis Taylor | 0–2 | (England) Neal Foulds | |

Group 11

| Player 1 | Score | Player 2 | Date |
|---|---|---|---|
| (England) John Spencer | 2–1 | (England) Vic Harris | |
| (England) John Spencer | 1–2 | (England) Jack Fitzmaurice | |
| (England) Jack Fitzmaurice | 2–0 | (England) Vic Harris | |

Group 12

| Player 1 | Score | Player 2 | Date |
|---|---|---|---|
| (England) Dave Martin | 2–1 | (England) Mick Fisher | |
| (England) Dave Martin | 2–1 | (England) Bob Harris | |
| (England) Mick Fisher | 2–0 | (England) Bob Harris | |

Group 13

| Player 1 | Score | Player 2 | Date |
|---|---|---|---|
| (Republic of Ireland) Patsy Fagan | 1–2 | (Scotland) Eddie McLaughlin | |
| (Australia) Warren King | 2–0 | (Scotland) Eddie McLaughlin | |
| (Republic of Ireland) Patsy Fagan | 2–1 | (Australia) Warren King | |

Group 14

| Player 1 | Score | Player 2 | Date |
|---|---|---|---|
| (England) Tony Meo | 0–2 | (Australia) Paddy Morgan | |
| (England) Tony Meo | 2–0 | (Wales) Clive Everton | |
| (Australia) Paddy Morgan | 0–2 | (Wales) Clive Everton | |

Group 15

| Player 1 | Score | Player 2 | Date |
|---|---|---|---|
| (Scotland) Eddie Sinclair | 2–0 | (England) Ray Edmonds | |
| (Scotland) Eddie Sinclair | 2–0 | (England) John Hargreaves | |
| (England) Ray Edmonds | 2–1 | (England) John Hargreaves | |

Group 16

| Player 1 | Score | Player 2 | Date |
|---|---|---|---|
| (England) Dean Reynolds | 1–2 | (Republic of Ireland) Paul Watchorn | |
| (England) John Dunning | 2–1 | (Republic of Ireland) Paul Watchorn | |
| (England) Dean Reynolds | 1–2 | (England) John Dunning | |

Group 17

| Player 1 | Score | Player 2 | Date |
|---|---|---|---|
| (England) Rex Williams | 2–1 | (England) Les Dodd | |
| (England) Rex Williams | 0–2 | (England) Pat Houlihan | |
| (England) Les Dodd | 2–1 | (England) Pat Houlihan | |

Group 18

| Player 1 | Score | Player 2 | Date |
|---|---|---|---|
| (England) Mike Hallett | 2–1 | (England) Mike Darrington | |
| (Wales) Cliff Wilson | 2–1 | (England) Mike Hallett | |
| (Wales) Cliff Wilson | 0–2 | (England) Mike Darrington | |

Group 19

| Player 1 | Score | Player 2 | Date |
|---|---|---|---|
| (England) John Virgo | 2–1 | (England) Graham Cripsey | |
| (England) John Virgo | 2–0 | (Scotland) Ian Black | |
| (Scotland) Ian Black | 0–2 | (England) Graham Cripsey | |
