= 1981 English Professional Championship =

English Professional Championship
Tournament information
- Dates: 8–15 March 1981
- Venue: Haden Hill Leisure Centre
- City: Old Hill, Sandwell
- Country: England
- Format: Non-ranking event
- Total prize fund: £4,000

Final
- Champion: Steve Davis
- Runner-up: Tony Meo
- Score: 9–3

The 1981 John Courage English Professional Championship was a professional non-ranking snooker tournament, which took place in March 1981 at Haden Hill Leisure Centre, Old Hill in the Metropolitan Borough of Sandwell, England.

Steve Davis won the title by defeating Tony Meo 9–3 in the final.

== Main draw ==
Best of 17 frames

First round
Jim Meadowcroft | 9
John Barrie | 3
Ray Edmonds | 9
Mike Hallett | 3
Joe Johnson | 9
Tony Knowles | 2
Mark Wildman | 9
Bernard Bennett | 3
John Dunning | 9
David Greaves | 4

Last 16
Steve Davis | 9
Jim Meadowcroft | 2
John Spencer | 9
Pat Houlihan | 1
Ray Edmonds | 9
Fred Davis | 6
Joe Johnson | w/o
John Pulman | w/d
Tony Meo | 9
John Virgo | 6
Graham Miles | 9
Sid Hood | 1
Willie Thorne | 9
Mark Wildman | 2
John Dunning | 9
David Taylor | 8

Quarter-final
Steve Davis | 9
John Spencer | 7
Ray Edmonds | 9
Joe Johnson | 5
Tony Meo | 9
Graham Miles | 7
Willie Thorne | 9
John Dunning | 0

Semi-final
Steve Davis | 9
Ray Edmonds | 0
Tony Meo | 9
Willie Thorne | 8

Final
Steve Davis | 9
Tony Meo | 3
