= 1974 World Snooker Championship =

1974 Park Drive World Snooker Championship
Tournament information
- Dates: 16–25 April 1974
- Venue: Belle Vue
- City: Manchester
- Country: England
- Organisation: WPBSA
- Format: Ranking event
- Total prize fund: £10,000
- Winner's share: £2,000
- Highest break: Graham Miles (ENG) (131)

Final
- Champion: Ray Reardon (WAL)
- Runner-up: Graham Miles (ENG)
- Score: 22–12

The 1974 World Snooker Championship (also known as 1974 Park Drive World Snooker Championship for sponsorship reasons) was a professional snooker tournament that took place from 16 to 25 April 1974 at the Belle Vue in Manchester, England. It was the 1974 edition of the World Snooker Championship, established in 1927. The 1974 tournament was promoted by Snooker Promotions, and sponsored by tobacco brand Park Drive. The event attracted 31 entrants and carried a prize fund of £10,000. Seven qualifying matches were held; the seven winners of these joined the other 17 players in the main tournament.

Ray Reardon won the title by defeating Graham Miles 22–12 in the final. It was Reardon's third World Championship win, after his first in 1970; he was the defending champion from 1973 World Snooker Championship. He went on to win a further three titles, the last of them in 1978. There were five century breaks during the competition, the highest of which was 131 by Miles. A plate competition was held, for losers in the first and second rounds of the main tournament. John Spencer defeated John Pulman 15–5 in the plate competition final, and recorded six century breaks during his four matches.

== Background ==
The World Snooker Championship is a professional tournament and the official world championship of the game of snooker. The sport was developed in the late 19th century by British Army soldiers stationed in India. Professional English billiards player and billiard hall manager Joe Davis noticed the increasing popularity of snooker compared to billiards in the 1920s, and with Birmingham-based billiards equipment manager Bill Camkin, persuaded the Billiards Association and Control Council (BACC) to recognise an official professional snooker championship in the 1926–27 season. In 1927, the final of the first professional snooker championship was held at Camkin's Hall; Davis won the tournament. The annual competition was not titled the World Championship until 1935, but the 1927 tournament is now referred to as the first World Snooker Championship.

In 1952, the, following a dispute between the Professional Billiards Players' Association (PBPA) and the BACC about the distribution of income from the world championship, the PBPA members established an alternative competition known as the World Professional Match-play Championship, the editions of which are now recognised as world championships, whilst only two players entered for the BACC's 1952 World Snooker Championship. The World Professional Match-play Championship continued until 1957, after which there were no world championship matches until professional Rex Williams gained agreement from the BACC that the world championship would be staged on a challenge basis, with defending champion Pulman featuring in the first match. Pulman retained the title in several challenges from 1964 to 1968.

The 1969 championship, when the tournament reverted to a knockout format, is regarded as the first of the modern snooker era, and was won by John Spencer. From 1972, the championship was organised by the World Professional Billiards and Snooker Association (WPBSA), which was the renamed PBPA. The defending champion was Ray Reardon, who defeated Eddie Charlton 38–32 in the 1973 final.

=== Format ===
The 1974 competition was promoted by Snooker Promotions, a company established by Peter West and Patrick Nally. The tournament was sponsored by tobacco brand Park Drive, with £10,000 prize money. This was the last time that Park Drive sponsored the event and there was no sponsor the following year. The venue was Belle Vue, Manchester. There were 31 entrants. A qualifying round was held on 11 April, and the main tournament was held from 16 to 25 April 1974, initially with concurrent play across eight different snooker tables, and two sessions per day. The seven qualifiers and nine other players contested the first round matches, with winners from those matches each then meeting one of the eight players who had been exempted to the second round.

=== Prize fund ===
The winner of the event received £2,000 from a total prize fund of £10,000. The breakdown of prize money for the event is shown below.

- Winner: £2,000
- Runner-up: £1,200
- Third: £800 (Note: No record of a third-place playoff match was found in sources consulted.)
- Fourth: £750
- Quarter-finalists: unknown
- Second round losers: unknown
- First round losers: £150

== Tournament summary ==
=== Qualifying ===
A qualifying round was held on 11 April, with seven matches played as the best-of-15 frames; a seven-frame session followed by an eight-frame session. Former champion John Pulman whitewashed Jack Karnehm 8–0. Dennis Taylor won the first frame against Marcus Owen on a respotted black, but this was the only frame he won in the first session of seven frames. David Taylor, recovering from tonsilitis, won in the deciding frame against Ron Gross. Warren Simpson, feeling ill from the effects of his diabetes, won seven consecutive frames from 1–3 against Jack Rea to progress. A report in Snooker Scene magazine described the general standard of play in the qualifying round as "disappointing".

=== First round ===
The first round matches were played as the best-of-15 frames on 16 April across two sessions - seven frames in the afternoon session and eight frames in the evening. Simpson discharged himself from hospital, where he had spent several days due to influenza, one hour before his match against Bernard Bennett, and lost 2–8. Cliff Thorburn led 3–1 against Paddy Morgan, but lost 4–8. Tournament debutant Bill Werbeniuk took five successive frames from 2–2 against Geoff Thompson, and won 8–3. Pulman followed his whitewash of Karnehm in qualifying with another win without losing a frame, against Sidney Lee. In the round's other matches, Marcus Owen eliminated Maurice Parkin 8–5; Ian Anderson won only the second frame against Perrie Mans; Kingsley Kennerley lost 5–8 to Jim Meadowcroft; and John Dunning defeated David Taylor 8–6.

=== Second round ===
On 17 and 18 April the best-of-29 frames second round matches were held. The matches were scheduled across three seven-frame sessions and a concluding eight-frame session. Reardon constructed a 6–1 lead against Meadowcroft, and took six of the following seven frames too. After completing a 15–3 victory, Reardon questioned – in a tone that the ‘’Daily Telegraph’’ reported as "asking blandly" – "Who can beat me?" Marcus Owen led his older brother Gary Owen 9–5, after finishing the first session 4–3 ahead, and won 15–8. Alex Higgins made breaks of 69, 67, 64 and 63 while taking a 6–0 lead against Bennett, eventually eliminating him 15–4. Werbeniuk lost the first seven frames against Fred Davis, and was 4–10 behind after two sessions. Davis won the match 15–5. Charlton established a 5–2 lead against Dunning, but during the second session Dunning won six consecutive frames and was 8–6 up at the end of the session, despite Charlton making the tournament's first century break, 100. Dunning increased his lead to four frames at 13–9. Charlton took the next four frames to draw level, but Dunning won the next two and progressed to the quarter-finals. Spencer, affected by influenza, was two frames behind Mans, 6–8, after two sessions. The quality of Mans's potting compensated for his inaccurate positional play as he ran out a 15–13 winner. Miles defeated Morgan 15–7, and Williams defeated Pulman 15–12.

=== Quarter-finals ===
The quarter-finals were staged on 19 and 20 April, as the best-of-29 frames: three seven-frame sessions followed by one of eight frames. Owen made a 102 break to equalise at 3–3 with Reardon, and won the following frame when Reardon went in-off the final black ball. Owen took the first two frames of the third session to draw level at 8–8, but toward the end of the match Reardon took four of the last five frames to win 15–11. Miles constructed a 4–0 lead against Dunning, and made a 110 break in the third frame of the third session, to put him 11–6 up. Dunning then won five frames in succession to equalise, and, with both players making a number of errors, Miles went on to take the match 15–13. According to Snooker Scene, Higgins and Davis both looked "ill at ease" during their match. Higgins led 9–5 after the first day, and had an increased advantage at 11–6. Davis narrowed his deficit to a single frame at 12–13. Higgins won the 26th frame with a break of 54, leaving him two ahead with three to play. With a break of 91 in the next frame, and a 45 in the following one, Davis forced a deciding frame, which he won. In this match against Williams, Mans won only three frames from the first 14, and lost 4–15. Williams made breaks of 30 or more in 15 of the 19 frames played.

=== Semi-finals ===
The semi-finals, as the best-of-29 frames, were played on 21 and 22 April. The matches were scheduled over four sessions; the first three sessions had seven frames, and the fourth session was eight frames. Reardon took an 11–3 lead against Davis, which included winning the last six frames of the first day. Reardon won the first four frames of the third session to secure a place in the final. Miles compiled a break of 131 to draw level at 3–3 with Williams, but was 3–4 behind at the conclusion of the first session. Williams, despite avoiding attacking play, made a series of errors, and Miles won 15–7.

=== Final ===
Reardon and Miles faced each other in the final, which took place from 23 to 25 April, as a best-of-43 frames contest across six sessions. The first two days both featured two seven-frame sessions. The sixth session was not required as the match was completed during the fifth session. Miles made his third century break of the championship, 101, in the fifth frame. Reardon led 4–3 after the first session and 9–5 after the second. During the third session, Reardon compiled his best break of tournament so far, 97, having made a 76 in the preceding frame. Former champion Joe Davis commented that Reardon was "a credit to the game. I’ve yet to see him become ruffled."

Reardon lost three of four frames in the fourth session, leaving him 17–11 ahead. Reardon secured victory at 22–12. Reardon said "I don't feel that I played any better than mediocre in the final, but this is because Graham never put me under pressure. I don't feel the elation that I felt at winning last year." It was Reardon's third world snooker championship win, after his first in 1970. He went on to win a further three titles, the last of them in 1978.

== Main draw ==
Results for the tournament are shown below. Winning players are denoted in bold.

**Round 1** Best of 15 frames 16 April
Kingsley Kennerley (ENG)	5
**Jim Meadowcroft (ENG)**	**8**
Maurice Parkin (ENG)	5
**Marcus Owen (WAL)**	**8**
**Bernard Bennett (ENG)**	**8**
Warren Simpson (AUS)	2
**Bill Werbeniuk (CAN)**	**8**
Geoff Thompson (ENG)	3
**Perrie Mans (SAF)**	**8**
Ian Anderson (AUS)	1
**John Pulman (ENG)**	**8**
Sydney Lee (ENG)	0
**Paddy Morgan (AUS)**	**8**
Cliff Thorburn (CAN)	4
**John Dunning (ENG)**	**8**
David Taylor (ENG)	6

**Round 2** Best of 29 frames 17 & 18 April
**Ray Reardon (WAL)**	**15**
Jim Meadowcroft (ENG)	3
Gary Owen (WAL)	8
**Marcus Owen (WAL)**	**15**
**Alex Higgins (NIR)**	**15**
Bernard Bennett (ENG)	4
**Fred Davis (ENG)**	**15**
Bill Werbeniuk (CAN)	5
John Spencer (ENG)	13
**Perrie Mans (RSA)**	**15**
**Rex Williams (ENG)**	**15**
John Pulman (ENG)	12
**Graham Miles (ENG)**	**15**
Paddy Morgan (AUS)	7
Eddie Charlton (AUS)	13
**John Dunning (ENG)**	**15**

**Quarter-finals**; Best of 29 frames 19 & 20 April
**Ray Reardon (WAL)**	**15**
Marcus Owen (WAL)	11
Alex Higgins (NIR)	14
**Fred Davis (ENG)**	**15**
Perrie Mans (RSA)	4
**Rex Williams (ENG)**	**15**
**Graham Miles (ENG)**	**15**
John Dunning (ENG)	13

**Semi-finals**; Best of 29 frames 21 & 22 April
**Ray Reardon (WAL)**	**15**
Fred Davis (ENG)	3
Rex Williams (ENG)	7
**Graham Miles (ENG)**	**15**

**Final**; Best of 43 frames 23, 24 & 25 April
**Ray Reardon (WAL)**	**22**
Graham Miles (ENG)	12

== Qualifying ==
The results from the qualifying competition were as follows. Winning players are denoted in bold.

Best of 15 frames
**John Dunning (ENG)**	**8**–2	David Greaves (ENG)
**Warren Simpson (AUS)**	**8**–3	Jackie Rea (NIR)
**Jim Meadowcroft (ENG)**	**8**–5	Pat Houlihan (ENG)
**Cliff Thorburn (CAN)**	**8**–3	Alan McDonald (AUS)
**John Pulman (ENG)**	**8**–0	Jack Karnehm (ENG)
**David Taylor (ENG)**	**8**–7	Ron Gross (ENG)
**Marcus Owen (WAL)**	**8**–1	Dennis Taylor (NIR)

== Century breaks ==
There were five century breaks during the tournament:

- 131, 110, 101 – Graham Miles
- 102– Marcus Owen
- 102– John Dunning

== Plate competition ==
A plate competition was held, for losers in the first and second rounds of the main tournament. Spencer won the plate by defeating Pulman 15–5 in the final, and recorded six century breaks during his four matches. He received £300 prize money for winning the plate.
