= 1973 World Snooker Championship =

1973 Park Drive World Snooker Championship
Tournament information
- Dates: 16–28 April 1973
- Venue: City Exhibition Halls
- City: Manchester
- Country: England
- Organisation: WPBSA
- Format: Single elimination
- Total prize fund: £8,000
- Winner's share: £1,500
- Highest break: John Spencer (ENG) (139)

Final
- Champion: Ray Reardon (WAL)
- Runner-up: Eddie Charlton (AUS)
- Score: 38–32

The 1973 World Snooker Championship (also known as the 1973 Park Drive World Snooker Championship for sponsorship reasons) was a snooker tournament that took place from 16 to 28 April 1973 at the City Exhibition Halls in Manchester, England. The scheduling was a change of practice from championships in the preceding years, which had taken place over several months. The tournament was the 1973 edition of the World Snooker Championship established in 1927. The 1973 tournament was promoted by Peter West and Patrick Nally, and sponsored by tobacco brand Park Drive, with £8,000 prize money. There were 24 entrants, which was a new championship record.

Ray Reardon won the title by defeating Eddie Charlton 38 frames to 32 in the final. It was Reardon's second World Championship win, after his first in 1970. He won a further four titles after the 1973 championship, the last of them in 1978. Defending champion Alex Higgins lost 9–13 to Charlton in the semi-finals. Higgins's quarter-final match against Fred Davis was interrupted when rainwater leaked onto the snooker table they were using. There were six century breaks during the competition, the highest of which was a 139 break compiled by John Spencer.

== Background ==
The World Snooker Championship is a professional tournament and the official world championship of the game of snooker. The sport was developed in the late 19th century by British Army soldiers stationed in India. Professional English billiards player and billiard hall manager Joe Davis noticed the increasing popularity of snooker compared to billiards in the 1920s, and with Birmingham-based billiards equipment manager Bill Camkin, persuaded the Billiards Association and Control Council (BACC) to recognise an official professional snooker championship in the 1926–27 season. In 1927, the final of the first professional snooker championship was held at Camkin's Hall; Davis won the tournament. The annual competition was not titled the World Championship until 1935, but the 1927 tournament is now referred to as the first World Snooker Championship.

In 1952, following a dispute between the Professional Billiards Players' Association (PBPA) and the BACC about the distribution of income from the world championship, the PBPA members established an alternative competition known as the World Professional Match-play Championship, the editions of which are now recognised as world championships, whilst only two players entered for the BACC's 1952 World Snooker Championship. The World Professional Match-play Championship continued until 1957, after which there was no world championship until 1964, when it was staged on a challenge basis, with defending champion John Pulman featuring in the first match. Pulman retained the title in several challenges from 1964 to 1968.

The 1969 championship, when the tournament reverted to a knockout format, is regarded as the first of the modern snooker era, and was won by John Spencer. From 1972, the championship was organised by the World Professional Billiards and Snooker Association (WPBSA), which was the renamed PBPA. For 1973, the tournament was sponsored by Park Drive. The defending champion was Alex Higgins, who had defeated Spencer 37–31 in the 1972 final.

== Tournament ==
=== Format ===
The 1973 competition took place over two weeks, rather than the months it had taken to complete previous championships in the preceding years. It was promoted by Peter West and Patrick Nally, and sponsored by tobacco brand Park Drive, with £8,000 prize money. There were 24 entrants, a new championship record. The venue was City Exhibition Halls, Manchester, initially with concurrent play across eight different snooker tables in different parts of the Halls. Sessions were scheduled at 2:00 pm and 7:30 pm each day. In order to break even, the event required 15,000 paying spectators across the matches; the actual attendance was 25,000. For the first time, a major bookmaker, Ladbrokes, offered odds on a snooker tournament. At the start of the tournament, the bookmakers rated Spencer as the favourite to win, at odds of 9–4, with Higgins second at 3–1.

=== Prize fund ===
The winner of the event received £1,500 from a total prize fund of £8,000. The breakdown of prize money for the event is shown below.

- Winner: £1,500
- Runner-up: £1,000
- Third: £750 (Note: No record of a third-place playoff match was found in sources consulted.)
- Fourth: £600
- Quarter-finalists: £400
- Second round losers: £200
- First round losers: £100

£100 was allocated for the winner of the plate competition between losers in the first two rounds, with £50 for the runner-up. John Pulman won the plate competition. (Note: No other record of the plate competition was found in sources consulted.)

=== First round ===
First round matches were scheduled as best-of-17 frames, taking place on 16 April 1973. Jackie Rea's cue, which he had used since the age of nine, was stolen a few days before his match against Pat Houlihan, and it was returned to him only near the end of their contest. Houlihan took a 2–0 lead, and Rea drew level at 2–2, but he then lost seven frames in a row and was eliminated from the competition. Bernard Bennett led 7–2 against David Greaves before the match went to a deciding frame, which Greaves won. Graham Miles made the highest break of the first round, 87, in his 9–5 defeat of Geoff Thompson.

Cliff Thorburn and Dennis Taylor made their world championship debuts; both players later became world champions. Taylor took a 4–2 lead, but Thorburn went ahead 8–6 and won the match 9–8. In the other matches of the first round, Perrie Mans eliminated Ron Gross 9–2, David Taylor beat John Dunning 9–4, and the 1970 runner-up Warren Simpson defeated Maurice Parkin 9–3. Jim Meadowcroft received a bye when his scheduled opponent Kingsley Kennerley withdrew due to illness.

=== Second round ===
In the second round, from 17 to 18 April, matches were played as best-of-31 frames. Higgins was admonished by tournament director Bruce Donkin for arriving more than 20 minutes late for his match against Houlihan, and was later fined £100 by the WPBSA for his behaviour. Higgins took a 6–1 lead in the first session, and led 14–1 after the second session. He took the second and fourth frames of the third session to complete a 16–3 victory. Fred Davis took the first ten frames against Greaves, and won 16–1. Miles led John Pulman 6–1 and 10–5, and made a break of 110 in the 20th frame of the match on the way to a 16–10 victory. Having established a 6–1 advantage against Mans in the first session, Eddie Charlton lost six of the eight frames in their second session, but then added six of seven in the third session, and two frames in the final session, to win 16–8.

Gary Owen was 8–7 ahead against Simpson, and eventually won 16–14. Ray Reardon compiled a break of 112 in the 27th frame of his 16–10 defeat of Meadowcroft. Rex Williams and Thorburn were level at 11–11; Williams then took a 14–11 lead, but Thorburn recovered to lead 15–14. Williams took the next two frames to secure his progress to the next round. Spencer made the highest break of the tournament with 139, in the sixth frame of his match against David Taylor, which he won 16–5.

=== Quarter-finals ===
The quarter-finals were scheduled as best-of-31 frames matches on 19 and 20 April, with the four matches played concurrently in different arenas. Higgins defeated Davis 16–14, after Davis had led 14–12. There was a 25-minute stoppage during the second frame of their afternoon session, when rainwater leaked onto the snooker table they were using. Williams compiled a break of 108 at the start of his first session against Spencer but lost 16–7. Miles recovered to 4–5 after losing the first five frames against Charlton. Although Miles lost 6–16, the reporter for Snooker Scene wrote that "rarely has anyone played so well and lost so heavily." Owen lost by the same scoreline against Reardon, after winning the first two frames. According to Reardon, in his 1982 autobiography, there were only two spectators for part of the match.

=== Semi-finals ===
The semi-finals, held from 21 to 23 April, were best-of-45 frames matches, played concurrently. Reardon staged a recovery when, having trailed Spencer 12–19, he won their semi-final 23–22. From 12–19, Reardon won eight consecutive frames. The reporter for Snooker Scene described Reardon's comeback as "the greatest recovery the event has ever seen." Charlton took a 6–0 lead against Higgins, and defeated him 23–9. Higgins attributed his defeat to playing with an unfamiliar cue, that he had been using for under two months. Charlton remarked that "I think pressure had an awful lot to do with his poor performance. But I feel he has a lot to learn about the game. Whether he is capable of learning, we shall just have to wait and see." After the match, Higgins challenged Charlton to play for a stake of £100 and won 7–4.

=== Final ===
The final was played as a best-of-75 frames contest from 24 to 28 April. Reardon lost the first session of the final against Charlton 0–7. He won the first frame of the second session with a break of 84, and also took the next three frames, to trail 4–7. Having won five of the eight frames in the second session, for 5–10, Reardon added five of the seven frames in the third session, to close the gap at 10–12. The pair were level at 12–12 and 13–13, and Reardon led 17–13 after the fourth session, before going ahead 27–25 after seven sessions of play. At the start of the eighth session, Reardon was affected by the bright lighting that had been installed for the purposes of television coverage, and he lost the first three frames. He complained about the lighting, and two large lights that were focused on the audience were switched off. From 27–28 behind, Reardon won four of the next five frames in the session, and sustained the momentum for an eventual 38–32 victory.

For the first time, some frames of the final were televised by the BBC. According to snooker historian Clive Everton, "Charlton's dogged consistency proved no match for Reardon's flair and wider range of shots." It was Reardon's second world snooker championship win, after his first in 1970. He went on to win a further four world titles, the last of them in 1978.

== Main draw ==
Results are shown below. Winning players are denoted in bold. There were eight seeds; their seedings are denoted in brackets.

**Round 1** Best of 17 frames
**Pat Houlihan (ENG)** | **9**
Jackie Rea (NIR) | 2
**David Greaves (ENG)** | **9**
Bernard Bennett (ENG) | 8
**Graham Miles (ENG)** | **9**
Geoff Thompson (ENG) | 5
**Perrie Mans (RSA)** | **9**
Ron Gross (ENG) | 2
**Warren Simpson (AUS)** | **9**
Maurice Parkin (ENG) | 3
**Jim Meadowcroft (ENG)** | **w/o**
Kingsley Kennerley (ENG) | w/d
**Cliff Thorburn (CAN)** | **9**
Dennis Taylor (NIR) | 8
**David Taylor (ENG)** | **9**
John Dunning (ENG) | 4

**Round 2** Best of 31 frames
**Alex Higgins (NIR)** (1) | **16**
Pat Houlihan (ENG) | 3
**Fred Davis (ENG)** (8) | **16**
David Greaves (ENG) | 1
John Pulman (ENG) (4) | 10
**Graham Miles (ENG)** | **16**
**Eddie Charlton (AUS)** (5) | **16**
Perrie Mans (RSA) | 8
**Gary Owen (WAL)** (6) | **16**
Warren Simpson (AUS) | 14
**Ray Reardon (WAL)** (3) | **16**
Jim Meadowcroft (ENG) | 10
**Rex Williams (ENG)** (7) | **16**
Cliff Thorburn (CAN) | 15
**John Spencer (ENG)** (2) | **16**
David Taylor (ENG) | 5

**Quarter-finals**; Best of 31 frames
**Alex Higgins (NIR)** (1) | **16**
Fred Davis (ENG) (8) | 14
Graham Miles (ENG) | 6
**Eddie Charlton (AUS)** (5) | **16**
Gary Owen (WAL) (6) | 6
**Ray Reardon (WAL)** (3) | **16**
Rex Williams (ENG) (7) | 7
**John Spencer (ENG)** (2) | **16**

**Semi-finals**; Best of 45 frames
Alex Higgins (NIR) (1) | 9
**Eddie Charlton (AUS)** (5) | **23**
**Ray Reardon (WAL)** (3) | **23**
John Spencer (ENG) (2) | 22

**Final**; Best of 75 frames
Eddie Charlton (AUS) (5) | 32
**Ray Reardon (WAL)** (3) | **38**

== Century breaks ==
There were six century breaks during the tournament:

- 139, 106 – John Spencer
- 112, 109 – Ray Reardon
- 110 – Graham Miles
- 108 – Rex Williams
