= Kingsley Kennerley =

English billiards and snooker player (1913–1982)

Personal information
- Born: 27 December 1913 Congleton, Cheshire, England
- Died: 26 June 1982 (aged 68) Castle Bromwich, Birmingham, England

Sport
- Country: England
- Sport: Snooker
- Professional: 1945–1982

Kingsley Kennerley (27 December 1913 – 26 June 1982) was an English billiards and snooker player. From 1937 to 1940, he appeared in each English Amateur Snooker Championship and English Amateur Billiards Championship final. He won the Billiards Championship for those four consecutive years, and the Snooker title in 1937 and 1940. His billiards break of 549 in the 1937 event remained the championship record until 1978. In 1938, he was runner-up in the Empire Amateur Billiards Championship, losing to Bob Marshall in the final, but making the championship record break of 472.

He turned professional in 1945, at a time when there was little public interest in professional billiards. He was runner-up in the UK Professional English Billiards Championship in 1950 and 1951. He entered the World Snooker Championship regularly in the 1940s and 1950s, and played twice in the tournament in the 1970s. After several years of not competing professionally, he played in both snooker and billiards tournaments in 1980. He died on 26 June 1982 after having his third heart attack.

== Early life ==
Kingsley Kennerley was born on 27 December 1913 in Congleton, Cheshire. He was the son of Sam Kennerley, who played bowls for Cheshire County; his son also represented the county at the game. Kingsley described his early life as "pretty hard", in a working class family often affected by unemployment. He started playing English billiards and snooker aged about 11. He practised the games at the Congleton Brass Band Club, which he attended as a cornet player although his actual motivation was playing the games rather than an instrument. At the club he saw a billiards exhibition match played by professional Jim Harris, which sparked Kennerley's interest in top-of-the-table play. By the age of 14, he was making breaks of over 200. In a 1937 interview, he said that he had never received coaching as a young player: "there was nothing mathematical about my progress ... I was just a kid, mad keen about the game, and my improvement came naturally without any sort of routine, or study, or long hours of practice." Three years later, he lost his job in a silk mill; initially this gave him more time to play billiards, but he then took a night-shift job where he worked 78 hours a week and had no time for practice. This lasted for about four years; when he lost that job, aged 21, he started playing again, using a cue that Tom Newman had given him.

== Career ==
In February 1935, Kennerley won a cue from The Billiard Player, the official magazine of the Billiards Association and Control Council, for making the highest break in that month, 301. In 1935, when he was unemployed, his friends collected money for him to enter the English Amateur Billiards Championship; he lost in the Midlands area final to Frank Edwards. One of the spectators at the final, Mr. J.C. Pitchford, employed Kennerley, who had relevant experience, in the garage of his engineering firm Richard Lloyd. In the following year's Championship, he defeated Edwards in the Midlands area final, and reached the quarter-finals of the main competition.

In the period from 1937 to 1940 Kennerley enjoyed success as an amateur in both billiards and snooker, appearing in each national English Amateur Snooker Championship and English Amateur Billiards Championship final held in that period. He won the Billiards Championship for those four consecutive years, and the Snooker title in 1937 and 1940. The correspondent for The Times reporting on the 1937 billiards final, where Kennerley used the cue that he had been presented with in 1935, wrote that Kennerley had "the subtlety of thought which gives him imagination and, with it, scoring ability" and praised his positional play and self-control. Kennerley's billiards break of 549 in the 1937 event remained the championship record until 1978, and he held the record break in the snooker tournament, 69, in 1939. In 1938 he travelled to Melbourne and was runner-up in the Empire Amateur Billiards Championship, losing to Bob Marshall in the final, but making the championship record break of 472. In 1939 he made the first officially-recognised snooker century break by an amateur player. On 11 May 1939, he married Gladys Smith, a former colleague at Richard Lloyd, after a three-year engagement. On a tour of India later that year, he set Indian national record breaks in both billiards (1,118) and snooker (77).

He announced in 1945 that he intended to become a professional after completing his national service as a munitions worker that year. The Billiard Player described him as "one of the greatest amateurs the world has ever seen ... a welcome addition to the professional ranks." At the time however, there was little public interest in professional billiards. He played in the World Snooker Championship each year from 1946 until 1954 but did not progress beyond the second round. After missing the 1955 and 1956 World Championships, he was one of the four entrants in 1957, when he lost his semi-final match against Jackie Rea 12–25. Kennerley won both his qualifying matches and joined the 1954/1955 News of the World Snooker Tournament. He finished fourth of the nine players in the tournament, where players were handicapped.

He was runner-up in the UK Professional English Billiards Championship in 1950, losing 5,069–9,046 to John Barrie, and again the following year when he was defeated 6,011–8,120 by Fred Davis.

After 1957, a decline in public interest meant that the World Snooker Championship was not played as a full tournament again until the 1969 tournament, which started in November 1968. In 1969, the BBC2 started showing Pot Black, which led to a great increase in the popularity of snooker. Kennerley played in the first three series of Pot Black from 1969 to 1971. Afterwards, he continued to play occasionally in professional snooker events. He was scheduled to play Fred Davis at the 1972 World Snooker Championship but withdrew due to illness. He missed his scheduled match against Jim Meadowcroft at the 1973 Championship due to being hospitalised following a heart attack. He played Meadowcroft in the first round of the 1974 edition and lost 5–8. After 1974, his next competitive match was at the 1980 World Championship qualifying, when he lost 2–9 to Mike Hallett. He was defeated 1–9 by Eddie Sinclair in the qualifying for the 1980 UK Championship, after a walkover against Rea, and by the same score by Pat Houlihan in the following year's qualifying.

In 1980, the World Professional Billiards Championship was contested as a knockout tournament for the first time since 1934. Steve Davis eliminated Kennerley in the qualifying round, 1,859–965. In the preliminary round of the 1981 UK Professional English Billiards Championship, he lost 879–1,078 to John Pulman. At the 1982 World Billiards Championship, the next time it was held after 1980, he lost his first match 753–1,500 against Ray Edmonds. Kennerley died at home in Castle Bromwich, Birmingham on 26 June 1982 after having his third heart attack.

== Snooker performance timeline ==
Post-war tournament performance
Tournament	1945/ 46	1946/ 47	1947/ 48	1948/ 49	1949/ 50	1950/ 51	1951/ 52	1952/ 53	1953/ 54	1954/ 55	1955/ 56	1956/ 57	1957/ 58	1958/ 59	1959/ 60	Ref.
Sunday Empire News Tournament	Not Held			LQ	Tournament Not Held											
World Professional Match-play Championship	Tournament Not Held						QF	QF	QF	A	A	SF	Not Held			
News of the World Snooker Tournament (Note: Round-robin handicap tournament) (Note: Snooker Plus event in 1959/60 season)	Tournament Not Held				A	LQ	LQ	LQ	A	4th/9	A	A	A	A	A	
World Championship	LQ	LQ	QF	QF	QF	QF	A	Tournament Not Held								

Modern era tournament performance
Tournament	1968/ 69	1969/ 70	1970/ 71	1971/ 72	1972/ 73	1973/ 74	1974/ 75	1975/ 76	1976/ 77	1977/ 78	1978/ 79	1979/ 80	1980/ 81	1981/ 82	Ref.
Ranking tournaments
World Championship	A	A	A	WD	WD	1R	A	A	A	LQ	A	A	A	A	
Non-ranking tournaments
World Championship Plate (Note: Competition for losers in the early rounds of the world championship)	Not Held			WD	WD	1R	Tournament Not Held								
International Open	Tournament Not Held													LQ	
UK Championship	Tournament Not Held								A	A	A	A	LQ	LQ	
Pot Black	SF	??	??	A	A	A	A	A	A	A	A	A	A	A	
Bass & Golden Leisure Classic	Tournament Not Held													1R	

Performance Table Legend
LQ	lost in qualifying draw	#R	lost in the early rounds of the tournament (WR = Wildcard round)
QF	advanced to but not past the quarterfinals	SF	advanced to but not past the semi-finals
A	did not participate in the tournament	WD	withdrew from the tournament
??	no reliable source available for progress		

== Career titles ==
Snooker

- English Amateur Championship: 1937, 1940

Billiards

- English Amateur Billiards Championship: 1937, 1938, 1939, 1940
