= Jonathan Barron =

English snooker player

Personal information
- Born: 2 March 1937 (age 89)

Sport
- Country: England
- Sport: Snooker

Jonathan Barron (born 2 March 1937) is a retired English snooker player. He won the 1970 World Amateur Snooker Championship and was the first player to win the English Amateur Championship in three consecutive years.

== Career ==
Barron was born on 2 March 1937. He started playing snooker when he was about 10, on a three-quarter size table above his father's shop in the village of Mevagissey.

He first reached the final of the English Amateur Championship in 1962, where he was defeated 9–11 by Ron Gross. He won the 1962–63 Television Tournament, a pro–am event, and also a televised amateur tournament the following season. He was runner-up again in 1969, 9–11 to Ray Edmonds. He gained the title in 1970 by defeating Sid Hood 11–10 in the final, and retained it in 1971 with an 11–7 defeat of Doug French. In 1972, he was again the champion, prevailing 11–9 against Edmonds, thereby becoming the first player to win the title in three consecutive years. He was the first English Amateur champion since 1961 not to turn professional. Barron travelled with Ray Reardon to South Africa in 1967. Reardon played Jimmy van Rensberg in the South African Challenge. Reardon beat van Rensberg winning by two matches to one.

Barron represented England at the 1970 World Amateur Snooker Championship, winning five of his six group matches to reach the final, where he defeated Hood 11–7 to win the title. Attempting to defend his title at the 1972 World Amateur Snooker Championship, he won all three of his group matches, but then lost 6–8 to Edmonds in the semi-finals.

According to Barron, he retired from most competitive snooker after the 1972 World Amateur Championship (held in January 1973) to allow more time to focus on his family and business, although he did continue to play in local league games until 2000. He ran a curio shop in Mevagissey.

== Career highlights ==
Outcome	Year	Championship	Opponent in the final	Score	Ref.
Runner-up	1962	English Amateur Championship	Ron Gross (ENG)	9–11	
Winner	1963	Television Tournament	Ron Gross (ENG)	4–3	
Runner-up	1969	English Amateur Championship	Ray Edmonds (ENG)	9-11	
Winner	1970	English Amateur Championship	Sid Hood (ENG)	11–10	
Winner	1970	World Amateur Championship	Sid Hood (ENG)	11–7	
Winner	1971	English Amateur Championship	Doug French (ENG)	11–9	
Winner	1972	English Amateur Championship	Ray Edmonds (ENG)	11–9	
