= Doug French =

Scottish snooker player

Personal information
- Born: 26 January 1935 (age 91) Liverpool

Sport
- Country: England
- Sport: Snooker
- Professional: 1981–1985, 1991–1993

Douglas French (born 26 January 1935) is an English former professional snooker player.

== Career ==
French was born in Liverpool, on 26 January 1935. He started playing snooker aged 15, at the Wavertree Labour Club.

As an amateur, he won numerous titles, including the Butlins National Championship in 1965 and the Pontins National championship in 1970. When he reached the final of the English Amateur Championship in 1971, the Billiards and Snooker Control Council's magazine Billiards and Snooker described him as "a prolific break builder with a reputation for consistent long potting." He lost that final 9–11 to Jonathan Barron. Later in 1971, he reached the final of the Granada Television Trophy tournament, where he was defeated by John Virgo. With Des Myler, he reached the final of the inaugural national pairs snooker championship in 1975 where they lost to John Prosser and Des May.

He was accepted as a professional by the World Professional Billiards and Snooker Association (WPBSA) in 1981, and in his first professional event, the 1981 International Open, eliminated Geoff Foulds 5–3 and Pat Houlihan 5–2 before bring knocked out 0–5 by Rex Williams in the third qualifying round. Williams also defeated him 3–9 in the first qualifying round of the 1981 UK Championship. At the 1982 Bass and Golden Leisure Classic he won 2–1 against Kingsley Kennerley before a 1–3 defeat by Paul Medati. In the concluding event of his debut season, the 1982 World Snooker Championship he defeated 9–3 Bernard Bennett and then lost 6–9 to Patsy Fagan in the second qualifying round.

During the 1982–83 snooker season, French entered four tournaments but won only one match. In 1983–84 he reached the semi-final group stage of the 1984 International Masters, but otherwise made little progress in tournaments. After another season without notable success in 1984–85, he resigned from the WPBSA and was re-instated as an amateur.

After the WPBSA opened membership for events to anyone over the age of 16 that paid the relevant fee, French played professionally in 1991–92 without progressing beyond the second qualifying round of any event, and in one event in 1992–93. French was one of 76 players to either resign their WPBSA membership, or have their professional status removed due to non-payment of the £100 membership fee, in 1993.

== Career highlights ==
Outcome	Year	Championship	Opponent in the final	Score	Ref.
Runner-up	1971	English Amateur Championship	Jonathan Barron (ENG)	9–11	
