= 1972 World Amateur Snooker Championship =

Tournament information
- Dates: 4–20 January 1973
- City: Various venues
- Country: Wales
- Organisation: Billiards and Snooker Control Council
- Format: Round-robin and knockout
- Highest break: Ray Edmonds (ENG), 101

Final
- Champion: Ray Edmonds (ENG)
- Runner-up: Mannie Francisco (SAF)
- Score: 11–10

The 1972 World Amateur Snooker Championship was the fifth edition of the tournament that later became known as the IBSF World Snooker Championship. The 1972 tournament was played in venues in Wales from 4 to 20 January 1973. Ray Edmonds defeated Mannie Francisco 11–10 in the final to win the title.

== Tournament summary ==
The first World Amateur Snooker Championship was held in 1963. Jonathan Barron, who won the title in 1970, was the defending champion for 1972.

The tournament was held at venues in Wrexham, Cardiff, and Aberdare from 4 to 20 January 1973. There were four round-robin groups, with the top two players from each group progressing to a second round-robin stage. The top two players from the second-stage groups progressed to the knockout stage.

Ray Edmonds defeated Mannie Francisco 11–10 in the final to win the title. The final was held on 19 and 20 January, at Sophia Gardens Pavilion, Cardiff. Edmonds was 1–6 behind at the end of the first day's play, but won five of the seven frames in the afternoon session on 20 January to reduce his deficit to two frames at 6–8. Franscico won the first frame of the third session to lead 9–6, before Edmonds levelled the match at 9–9. Edmonds took the lead at 10–9, but Francisco forced a deciding frame by winning the twentieth frame. Edmonds won the last frame to claim victory.

Edmonds made the highest break of the tournament, 101, during the first group stage; and the highest break of the final, 40.

== Qualifying groups ==
The final tables are shown below. Players in bold qualified for the next round.

Group A

Player	MW	FW	FL	Break
**Jimmy van Rensberg (SAF)**	3	12	6	45
**Kelvin Tristram (NZL)**	1	8	8	50
Geoff Thomas (WAL)	1	6	8	32
Bert Demarco (SCO)	1	6	10	41

Group B

Player	MW	FW	FL	Break
**Mannie Francisco (SAF)**	3	15	5	47
**Jonathan Barron (ENG)**	3	15	10	50
Alfred Borg (MLT)	2	12	11	59
Alwyn Lloyd (WAL)	2	11	14	41
Tony Monteiro (IND)	0	3	16	46

Group C

Player	MW	FW	FL	Break
**Paul Mifsud (MLT)**	4	16	5	61
**Ray Edmonds (ENG)**	3	14	7	101
Jack Rogers (IRE)	2	8	8	36
Mario Berni (WAL)	1	7	12	47
Brien Bennett (NZL)	0	3	16	30

Group D

Player	MW	FW	FL	Break
**Arvind Savur (IND)**	2	10	6	38
**Max Williams (AUS)**	2	9	7	48
David Sneddon (SCO)	2	9	9	34
Des May (WAL)	0	6	12	42

Semi-final Group A

Player	MW	FW	FL	Break
**Jonathan Barron (ENG)**	3	12	4	35
**Arvind Savur (IND)**	2	10	8	68
Kelvin Tristram (NZL)	1	6	8	29
Paul Mifsud (MLT)	0	6	12	50

Semi-final Group B

Player	MW	FW	FL	Break
**Mannie Francisco (SAF)**	2	11	9	70
**Ray Edmonds (ENG)**	2	11	9	39
Jimmy van Rensberg (SAF)	1	8	10	51
Max Williams (AUS)	1	9	11	78

== Knockout ==
Players in bold denote match winners.

**Semi-finals**; Best of 15 frames		**Final**; Best of 21 frames
Jonathan Barron (ENG)	6
**Ray Edmonds (ENG)**	**8**	**Ray Edmonds (ENG)**	**11**
**Mannie Francisco (SAF)**	**8**	Mannie Francisco (SAF)	10
Arvind Savur (IND)	7

== Final ==
Scores in bold indicate winning frame scores.

Final: Best of 21 frames. Sophia Gardens Pavilion, Cardiff. 19–20 January 1973
**Ray Edmonds** (England)	**11**–10	Mannie Francisco (South Africa)
19 January: 19–**69**; 46–**56**; 30–**61**; 33–**60**; 45–**54**; 23–**70**; **52**–42; 20 January afternoon: **55**–46; 43–**51**; **61**–34; **57**–34; **82**–20; 31–**74**; **54**–43; 20 January evening: 37–**49**; **50**–43; **61**–26; **58**–26; **58**–49; 40–**60**; **54**–31
