= 1962–63 Television Tournament (snooker) =

Individual snooker tournament

Tournament information
- Venue: National Liberal Club
- City: London
- Country: England
- Organisation: Billiards Association and Control Council
- Format: Non-ranking event

Final
- Champion: Jonathan Barron (ENG)
- Runner-up: Ron Gross (ENG)

The 1962–63 Television Tournament was a pro-am invitational snooker tournament, featuring eight players. There were four professional participants, and four amateurs. All four professionals lost in the opening round. The tournament was won by Jonathan Barron, who defeated Ron Gross 4–3 in the final. The event was also referred to as the "ITV tournament" and the "BACC Television Tournament".

== Schedule and handicaps ==
The intention had been for four professionals to compete against the four semi-finalists from the 1962 English Amateur Championship, but one of the amateurs, Alan Barnett, was unavailable. Geoff Thompson, holder of the world record amateur break, replaced Barnett. The schedule of matches was published in the Billiards Association and Control Council's magazine, The Billiard Player, in August 1962. The players were assigned a handicap as shown in parentheses, receiving the relevant number of points at the start of each frame. The professional players are indicated with an asterisk. All matches were played at the National Liberal Club. The matches were broadcast on ITV.

Match	Date	Players
1	20 October 1962	Fred Davis (ENG)* (receive 0) v Ron Gross (ENG) (receive 18)
2	10 November 1962	Jackie Rea (NIR)* (receive 10) v John Price (WAL) (receive 21)
3	1 December 1962	Rex Williams (ENG)* (receive 10) v Geoff Thompson (ENG) (receive 21)
4	22 December 1962	Kingsley Kennerley (ENG)* (receive 10) v Jonathan Barron (ENG) (receive 21)
Semi-final 1	12 January 1963	Winner of match 1 v Winner of match 3
Semi-final 2	2 February 1963	Winner of match 2 v Winner of match 4
Final	23 February 1963	Winner of Semi-final 1 v Semi-final 2

== Results ==
Gross defeated Davis 3–0 in their match, with Davis then winning the two "dead" frames. The match between Rea and Price went to a deciding frame, with Price prevailing. Williams played poorly as he lost 0–3 and the two dead frames to Thompson. Barron won 3–1 against Kennerley, and also won the dead frame. Snooker historian Clive Everton attributes the losses by all the professional players in the tournament to the lack of opportunities for professionals to participate in competitive events, at a time when the playing standards between professionals and top amateurs were comparable.

In the semi-finals, Gross eliminated Thompson 3–2, and Barron defeated Price 3–1. The final, between Barron and Gross, was a rematch of the 1962 English Amateur Championship final, which Gross had won 11–9. Gross won the first frame, before Barron took a 3–1 lead and Gross levelled the match at 3–3. Barron won the deciding frame convincingly, to take the title.

Players in bold denote match winners.

**Quarter-finals**; Best of 5 frames
Fred Davis (ENG)	0
**Ron Gross (ENG)**	**3**
Rex Williams (ENG)	0
**Geoff Thompson (ENG)**	**3**
Jackie Rea (NIR)	2
**John Price (WAL)**	**3**
Kingsley Kennerley (ENG)	1
**Jonathan Barron (ENG)**	**3**

**Semi-finals**; Best of 5 frames
**Ron Gross (ENG)**	**3**
Geoff Thompson (ENG)	2
John Price (WAL)	1
**Jonathan Barron (ENG)**	**3**

**Final**; Best of 7 frames
Ron Gross (ENG)	3
**Jonathan Barron (ENG)**	**4**

== Final ==
Scores in bold indicate winning frame scores.

Final: Best of 7 frames. National Liberal Club, London, 23 February 1963
**Jonathan Barron** (England)	**4**–3	Ron Gross (England)
34–**71**, **97**–26, **91**–21, **98**–14, 58–**64**, 30–**82**, **88**–12
