= Geoff Thompson (snooker player) =

English snooker player

Geoffrey Thompson
Personal information
- Born: 1929 (age 96–97)

Sport
- Country: England
- Sport: Snooker

Geoff Thompson (born 1929) is an English former professional snooker player.

== Career ==
Thompson was born in 1929. He started playing cue sports on a scaled-down table aged eight or nine, and on a full-sized billiard table from the age of 13. After serving in the armed forces, Thompson won a local English billiards competition in his home town of Leicester, and was runner-up in the 1952 CIU snooker championship to L.F. Taylor.

Having been runner-up CIU final again in 1953, and working as a telephone engineer, Thompson was competing for the first time in the English Amateur Championship when he eliminated the defending champion Tommy Gordon 3–2 and went on to win the title with an 11–9 victory over Cliff Wilson in the final. Due to ill health he withdrew from the 1955 tournament and so was unable to defend the title. In the 1962 championship he compiled a break of 115, a new world record for an officially-recognised amateur break. He was invited to participate in the 1962–63 Television Tournament and, receiving 11 points start in each frame under the handicapping system used, defeated professional Rex Williams 3–0, before losing 2–3 to Ron Gross. In 1966 and 1969 he won the CIU championship.

He turned professional in 1970. He played Maurice Parkin in the first qualifying round for the 1972 World Snooker Championship and lost 10–11, and was defeated 5–9 by Graham Miles in the first round of the 1973 World Snooker Championship. His last World Snooker Championship appearance was in 1974, where he was eliminated 3–8 by Bill Werbeniuk.

In 1953 he compiled a break of 141, but it was not recognised as a record as the billiard table did not meet the standards required by the Billiards Association and Control Council. At the time, the highest officially recognised break by an amateur was 104.

== Career finals ==
Outcome	Year	Championship	Opponent in the final	Score	Ref.
Winner	1954	English Amateur Championship	Cliff Wilson (WAL)	11–9	
