= Ron Gross =

English snooker player (1932–2005)

Personal information
- Born: 1932
- Died: 25 December 2005 (aged 73)

Sport
- Country: England
- Sport: Snooker
- Professional: 1970–1977

Ronald Gross (1932 – 25 December 2005) was an English professional snooker player. He won the English Amateur Championship three times before turning professional

== Career ==
Gross was born in 1932. When he was seven, he was partially paralysed after being hit on the temple in a playground accident, and spent 11 months in hospital. After his recovery, he required the support of a metal brace on one leg. He started playing snooker in about 1946 on a scaled-down table belonging to a family member, and then at a billiard hall in Ealing from the age of 15. In 1956, he won the Home counties championship of English billiards, playing in what the Billiard Association and Control Council's journal The Billiard Player termed a "revolutionary" style where most of the scoring was from potting the red rather than from losing hazards or cannons. He was already the home counties snooker champion. He first won the English Amateur Championship in 1957, with an 11–6 defeat of Stan Haslam in the final, followed by further title wins in 1960 (11–4 against John Price) and 1962 (11–9 against Jonathan Barron). In the 1962–63 Television Tournament, a pro–am event, receiving a start of 18 point per frame, he defeated professional Fred Davis 3–0 and was runner-up in the tournament, losing the final 3–4 to Jonathan Barron. In 1963 he reached the English Amateur final again, this time losing 3–11 to Gary Owen.

He turned professional in 1970. His first professional match was in March 1971, against Alex Higgins in the first qualifying round of the 1972 World Snooker Championship, resulting in a 4–11 loss. Gross had not played competitively for several years before the match, and admitted that he was out of practice and "played very poorly." Gross' next three professional competitions all ended with defeats in his first match. In the 1973 World Snooker Championship, Gross lost 2–9 to Perrie Mans, and at the 1973 Norwich Union Open he was eliminated 2–4 by Barron. At the 1974 World Snooker Championship he lost in the deciding frame against David Taylor, 8–9. An 8–5 win over Maurice Parkin at the 1976 World Snooker Championship was followed by a 4–8 loss to Jim Meadowcroft in the next round.

In 1977, he was reinstated as an amateur at his own request, saying that with the fees and expenses associated with being a professional player, it was necessary to "beat at least two really good players to get in the money at all". At the time, the prize money on the amateur circuit was growing. Snooker historian Clive Everton has suggested that Gross might have achieved much more as a professional if he had made the transition some years earlier than he did. Gross had worked as a betting shop manager whilst an amateur. In 1973, he opened the Ron Gross Snooker Centre in Neasden, and advised young players including Jimmy White, Tony Meo and Neal Foulds. Gross died on 25 December 2005, aged 73, from cancer. His friend Patsy Fagan had nursed him full-time for a year before this.

== Career highlights ==
Outcome	Year	Championship	Opponent in the final	Score	Ref.
Winner	1957	English Amateur Championship	Stan Haslam (ENG)	11–6	
Winner	1960	English Amateur Championship	John Price (WAL)	11–4	
Winner	1962	English Amateur Championship	Jonathan Barron (ENG)	11–9	
Runner-up	1963	Television Tournament	Jonathan Barron (ENG)	3–4	
Runner-up	1963	English Amateur Championship	Gary Owen (WAL)	3–11	
