= 1970 World Amateur Snooker Championship =

Tournament information
- Dates: 19 October – 7 November 1970
- Venue: Meadowbank Stadium
- City: Edinburgh
- Country: Scotland
- Organisation: Billiards Association and Control Club
- Format: Round-robin and final
- Highest break: Jack Rogers (IRE)

Final
- Champion: Jonathan Barron (ENG)
- Runner-up: Sid Hood (ENG)
- Score: 11–7

The 1970 World Amateur Snooker Championship was the fourth edition of the championship that later became known as the IBSF World Snooker Championship, the first event having been held in 1963. The 1970 tournament was played at the Meadowbank Stadium, Edinburgh, Scotland from 19 October to 7 November 1970, with two round-robin groups each producing one player to contest the final. Both finalists were from England. Jonathan Barron defeated Sid Hood 11–7 to win the title.

Jack Rogers made the highest break of the tournament, 65.

== Qualifying groups ==
The final tables are shown below.

Player	MW	FW	FL	Break
Sid Hood (ENG)	5	20	9	50
Paul Mifsud (MLT)	4	22	11	61
MJM Lafir (LKA)	4	20	16	50
John Phillips (SCO)	4	19	18	62
David Sneddon (SCO)	2	17	17	38
Laurie Glozier (NZL)	2	10	21	34
Jim Clint (NIR)	0	8	24	46

Player	MW	FW	FL	Break
Jonathan Barron (ENG)	5	21	13	51
Des May (WAL)	4	22	18	64
Shyam Shroff (IND)	3	18	14	47
Eddie Sinclair (SCO)	3	16	16	49
Jack Rogers (IRE)	3	16	19	65
Bert Demarco (SCO)	2	15	19	32
Harry Andrews (AUS)	1	13	22	35

== Final ==
Scores in bold indicate winning frame scores.

Final: Best of 21 frames. Meadowbank Stadium, Edinburgh. 6–7 November 1970
**Jonathan Barron** (England)	**11**–7	Sid Hood; England
First day: **61**–40; **53**–33; **62**–26; **59**–55; 31–**69**; **71**–20; **68**–26; 44–**54**; **57**–45; **60**–51; 24–**64**; 35–**63**; 26–**95**; 31–**60**; Second day: **75**–48; **54**–45; 35–**58**; **60**–48
27	Highest break	45
