= Sid Hood =

English snooker player

Personal information
- Born: 1933
- Died: 2006 (aged 72)

Sport
- Country: England
- Sport: Snooker
- Professional: 1979–1983

Sid Hood (1933–2006) was an English former professional snooker player. He was the runner-up at the 1970 World Amateur Snooker Championship.

== Career ==
Hood began playing cue sports at the age of 14. He worked as a docker and, in 1970, said that apart from participating in tournaments, he did not spend much time practicing snooker. As an amateur player, he won the Grimsby Senior Snooker Championship title 11 times between 1957 and 1977, and represented England 30 times.

In 1967 he reached the final of the English Amateur Championship, finishing as runner-up after being defeated 4–11 by Marcus Owen. He was a losing finalist again in 1970, to Jonathan Barron who won on the pink ball in the deciding frame. For the 1970 World Amateur Snooker Championship, Hood was one of two English representatives. and qualified for the final by winning five of his six round-robin group matches. Fellow Englishman Barron defeated him 7–11 in the final.

At the 1973 Norwich Union Open, Hood defeated professional Jackie Rea 4–0 and amateur Mannie Francisco 4–3 to reach the quarter-final, where he lost 0–4 to professional Eddie Charlton. In 1975, he won the English Amateur Championship with an 11–6 victory over Willie Thorne in the final; he took the Grimsby, Lincolnshire, and North of England titles in the same year. Two years later, he was runner-up in the 1977 English Amateur Championship to Terry Griffiths who defeated him 13–3. In the final of the 1978 Pontins Autumn Open he lost 6–7 to Jimmy White.

Unhappy with the way that the amateur game was being run, Hood applied to the World Professional Billiards and Snooker Association in 1979, but was rejected. A second application was also unsuccessful, but he was eventually admitted as a professional player.

In the qualifying competition for the 1980 World Snooker Championship, Hood defeated John Dunning 9–7. He then played Ray Edmonds, a rival from their amateur playing days in Grimsby and was eliminated 6–9. Hood participated in three tournaments during the 1980–81 snooker season but achieved only one match win, and in the following season he lost in his first match in both tournaments that he entered. He also played in the 1980 UK Professional English billiards championship, losing 1,029–1,670 to Steve Davis. In 1983, Hood resigned his membership of the World Professional Billiards and Snooker Association.

== Career highlights ==
Outcome	Year	Championship	Opponent in the final	Score	Ref.
Runner-up	1967	English Amateur Championship	Marcus Owen (WAL)	4–11	
Runner-up	1970	English Amateur Championship	Jonathan Barron (ENG)	10–11	
Runner-up	1970	World Amateur Championship	Jonathan Barron (ENG)	7–11	
Winner	1975	English Amateur Championship	Willie Thorne (ENG)	11–6	
Runner-up	1977	English Amateur Championship	Terry Griffiths (WAL)	3–13	
Runner-up	1978	Pontins Autumn Open	Jimmy White (ENG)	6–7	
