= 1972 World Snooker Championship =

Tournament information
- Dates: March 1971 – 26 February 1972
- Final venue: Selly Park British Legion
- Final city: Birmingham
- Country: England
- Organisation: WPBSA
- Winner's share: £480
- Highest break: Alex Higgins (NIR) (133)

Final
- Champion: Alex Higgins (NIR)
- Runner-up: John Spencer (ENG)
- Score: 37–31

The 1972 World Snooker Championship was a professional snooker tournament that took place between March 1971 and 26 February 1972, as an edition of the World Snooker Championship. The final was played at Selly Park British Legion from 21 to 26 February. Alex Higgins won his first world title, defeating defending champion John Spencer 37–31 in the final. Higgins also made the highest known break of the tournament, 133. In all, he won six matches to secure the title, including a 31–30 deciding frame victory over Rex Williams in the semi-final after Williams had missed an attempt to pot a blue ball. Higgins became the first qualifier to win the World Championship, and, aged 22, the youngest champion until Stephen Hendry in 1990. Higgins' win led to increased interest in snooker from the media and sponsors.

The tournament ran from March 1971 to February 1972, with matches at various venues. Spectators at the final were seated on wooden boards placed atop beer barrels. On the first evening of the final, the session was conducted with reduced light provided by a mobile generator, as the normal power supply was interrupted due to the miners' strike.

== Background ==
The World Snooker Championship is a professional tournament and the official world championship of the game of snooker. The sport was developed in the late 19th century by British Army soldiers stationed in India. Professional English billiards player and billiard hall manager Joe Davis noticed the increasing popularity of snooker compared to billiards in the 1920s, and with Birmingham-based billiards equipment manager Bill Camkin, persuaded the Billiards Association and Control Council (BACC) to recognise an official professional snooker championship in the 1926–27 season. In 1927, the final of the first professional snooker championship was held at Camkin's Hall; Davis won the tournament by beating Tom Dennis in the final. The annual competition was not titled the World Championship until 1935, but the 1927 tournament is now referred to as the first World Snooker Championship.

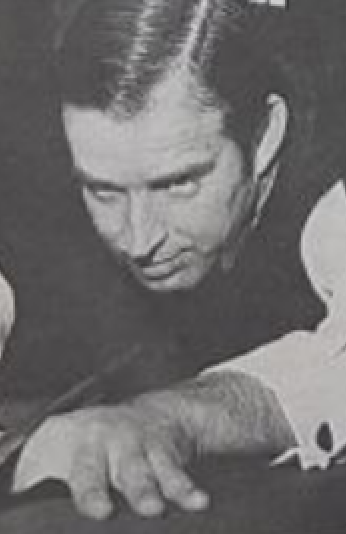
The defending champion was John Spencer (pictured in 1971).

In 1952, following a dispute between the Professional Billiards Players' Association (PBPA) and the BACC about the distribution of income from the world championship, the PBPA members established an alternative competition known as the World Professional Match-play Championship, the editions of which are now recognised as world championships, while only Horace Lindrum and Clark McConachy entered for the BACC's 1952 World Snooker Championship. The World Professional Match-play Championship continued until 1957, after which there were no world championship matches until professional Rex Williams gained agreement from the BACC that the world championship would be staged on a challenge basis, with defending champion Pulman featuring in the first match. Pulman retained the title in several challenges from 1964 to 1968. Pulman had been touring snooker clubs as promotional work for the tobacco brand John Player, and the company had sponsored his 1968 match against Eddie Charlton. The good attendances for the championship match led to John Player deciding to sponsor the 1969 World Snooker Championship as a knock-out format tournament, using their "Players No. 6" brand. The 1969 championship is regarded as the first of the modern snooker era, and was won by John Spencer, who defeated Gary Owen 37–24 in the final.

The 1972 championship was organised by the World Professional Billiards and Snooker Association, which was the renamed PBPA. The draw for players entering the competition was made in February 1971. There was an entry fee of £100 per player, with the intention that the winner would receive 60% of the combined entry fees, and the runner-up 40%, with gate receipts after expenses also going to players. There was no sponsor for the tournament, and the prize money was by arrangement with individual promoters; The defending champion was Spencer, who had won the 1971 World Snooker Championship (which was actually held in 1970) in Australia. The tournament ran from March 1971 to February 1972.

== Tournament summary ==
=== Qualifying and first round ===
The qualifying competition contained eight players of which two qualifiers joined other entrants in the competition proper. Those in the qualifying section included Alex Higgins, and four former amateur champions, Ron Gross, Maurice Parkin, Pat Houlihan and Geoff Thompson. In the first qualifying round, over 21 frames, two matches were played at the Brentham Club, Ealing. John Dunning led Houlihan 9-5 but won only by a single frame, 11–10. Higgins compiled a 103 break in the seventh frame against Gross, and reached a winning score at 11–4. It ended 16–5 after dead frames. Graham Miles eliminated Bernard Bennett at the Castle Club, Southampton, and made a 115 break in the 21st frame, making it 15–6. Parkin won in a deciding frame against Thompson at Barnsley Conservative Club.

In the second qualifying round, playing at Ecclesfield Ex-Servicemen's Club, Sheffield, Higgins took ten consecutive frames while defeating Parkin 11–3. Dunning eliminated Miles 11–5 at the Selly Park British Legion.

There were two matches played in the first round of the main competition. Higgins eliminated Jackie Rea 19–11 at the Ecclesfield Ex-Servicemen's Club. He compiled a 103 break in the third session and a 133 during the fourth session. Rea complimented Higgins on the performance, saying that "He does everything wrong. And yet he knocks such a lot in". John Pulman took a 6–2 lead against Dunning, and went on to win 19–7. Fred Davis was due to play Kingsley Kennerley, but proceeded by walkover when Kennerley withdrew due to illness.

=== Quarter-finals and semi-finals ===
Spencer eliminated Davis 31–21. Williams defeated the 1970 champion Reardon 25–23 in a match held across five different venues in Scotland. Reardon trailed 20–22 before winning the following three frames, after which Williams won three frames in succession to secure victory. Owen was expected to face Taylor, but withdrew after emigrating to Australia. His place in the draw was given to Charlton by the WPBSA. Charlton, who arrived from Australia on the first morning of his match against Taylor, won 31–25. Pulman took a 2–0 lead against Higgins, but was 2–3 behind before finishing their first day the odd frame ahead at 4–3. Higgins led 12–8 after the second day, and 19–14 at the close of day three. The penultimate day ended with Higgins 28–19 up, and although Pulman won the first two frames on the concluding day, Higgins secured victory at 31–23.

Spencer had embarked on a tour of Canada between the quarter-finals and semi-finals. He won 37–32 against Charlton, in the semi-final played at the Co-op Hall, Bolton, from 10 to 14 January. The players agreed on a £750 side bet to be paid by the losing player to the winner.

Williams took nine consecutive frames to establish a 12–6 lead against Higgins. Higgins next took the lead at 26–25. The match went to a deciding frame, and Williams was 28 points to 14 ahead when he missed an attempt to pot a blue ball from its spot into a middle pocket. Higgins compiled a break of 32, and then, following some safety play, potted the green ball to clinch victory, 31–30. Williams later commented "That blue could have changed the direction of both our careers."

On the day before the start of the Championship final, Spencer and Higgins contested the final of the Spring Park Drive 2000 event, which Spencer won 4–3.

=== Final ===
The final was played at the Selly Park British Legion, Birmingham, from 21 to 26 February, refereed by Jim Thorpe. Historian Dominic Sandbrook wrote in 2019 that the tournament had been "organized in conditions of laughable amateurishness" and that the final was played under "risibly ramshackle conditions". Spectators at the final were seated on wooden boards placed atop beer barrels. There was a miners' strike in progress at the same time as the final, and on the second evening of play, without normal power, the session was conducted with reduced light provided by a mobile generator.

Before the match started, Spencer was generally expected to win. The first session finished with the players tied at 3–3. In the eighth frame, Higgins made a break of 35, but Spencer then compiled a 101 break to take the frame. The first day ended with the score 6–6. Spencer made his second century break of the match, 109, in the 16th frame, and the third session concluded with the players again level, at 9–9, while the fourth session saw Spencer go 13–11 ahead. Day three closed with the score 18–18 at the half-way point of the match, and the players were still tied, now at 21–21, following the next session. Higgins then won six consecutive frames to make it 27–21. On day five, Spencer was stuck in a lift due to a power cut, and the match started ten minutes late. Higgins took the first frame of the ninth session, but lost four of the next five, leaving him 29–25 ahead. Both players won three frames in the tenth session. On the last day, Higgins clinched the 61st frame with a break of 40. Spencer then produced his third century break of the match, 123, in the 62nd frame, and added the next two frames to his tally with breaks over 50 in each. Higgins made a break of 82 in the 66th frame, which left him leading at 35–31. He took the opening frame of the concluding session by 62 points to 38, then compiled breaks of 94 and 46 to win the last frame he needed by 140 points to 0 to secure a 37–31 victory. (Note: Some sources give the score as 37–32. The CueSport Book of Professional Snooker: The Complete Record & History (2004) says "Higgins triumphed 37–31 (not 37–32 as so many publications have wrongly printed)".) Spencer made three century breaks during the final, while the highest break by Higgins was the 94 in the decisive frame. The trophy was presented to Higgins by Pulman.

Higgins, who was required to win two qualifying matches to reach the tournament proper, became the first qualifier to win the world snooker championship. The win made him the youngest champion, at the age of 22 years, 345 days, until Stephen Hendry won the title in 1990. He received £480 prize money for the match, while Spencer received £320, in addition to their earnings from previous rounds. Higgins also received 6,000 cigarettes from the sponsors. The final attracted little press attention; the match report in The Times ran to only 90 words. Shortly afterwards, however, there was increasing interest, particularly in Higgins, from news media. In March he was the subject of a profile in The Sunday People, and a documentary titled Hurricane Higgins was broadcast on ITV in September 1972.

Gordon Burn described Higgins's play on the Thursday evening of the final, during which Higgins won all six frames, as "snooker which, in its insolence, its exuberance, its confidence and its danger, few of those present have ever seen before". Journalist Donald Trelford wrote of Higgins that "This thin, pale, hollow-cheeked ex-jockey was something new to the game, cutting through its genteel pretensions like a swordsman." Snooker historian Clive Everton told Trelford that after Higgins's victory, "snooker was never the same again". Promotions company West and Nally, believing that the emergence of Higgins represented a commercial opportunity, organised a further Park Drive 2000 event. Park Drive sponsored the 1973 World Snooker Championship providing £8,000 in prize money. The 1973 Championship was staged as fortnight-long event rather than a much longer tournament like the 1972 Championship had been, and for the first time, part of the final was televised by the BBC.

== Main draw ==
Results are shown below. Winning players are denoted in bold.

First round (Best of 37 frames)
Player	Score	Player
**Alex Higgins (NIR)**	**19**–11	Jackie Rea (NIR)
**John Pulman (ENG)**	**19**–7	John Dunning (ENG)
**Fred Davis (ENG)**	w.o.	Kingsley Kennerley (ENG)

Quarter-finals
Best of 61 frames
**John Spencer (ENG)**	**31**
Fred Davis (ENG)	21
Best of 61 frames
**Eddie Charlton (AUS)**	**31**
David Taylor (ENG)	25
Best of 61 frames
**Alex Higgins (NIR)**	**31**
John Pulman (ENG)	23
Best of 49 frames
**Rex Williams (ENG)**	**25**
Ray Reardon (WAL)	23

Semi-finals
Best of 73 frames
**John Spencer (ENG)**	**37**
Eddie Charlton (AUS)	32
Best of 61 frames
**Alex Higgins (NIR)**	**31**
Rex Williams (ENG)	30

Final
Best of 73 frames
John Spencer (ENG)	31
**Alex Higgins (NIR)**	**37**

== Qualifying ==
Results are shown below. Winning players are denoted in bold.

Round 1 (Best of 21 frames)
Player	Score	Player
**Alex Higgins (NIR)**	**15**–6	Ron Gross (ENG)
**Maurice Parkin (ENG)**	**11**–10	Geoff Thompson (ENG)
**John Dunning (ENG)**	**11**–10	Pat Houlihan (ENG)
**Graham Miles (ENG)**	**15**–6	Bernard Bennett (ENG)

Round 2 (Best of 21 frames)
**Alex Higgins (NIR)**	**11**–3	Maurice Parkin (ENG)
**John Dunning (ENG)**	**11**–5	Graham Miles (ENG)

== Known century breaks ==
The known century breaks made at the qualifying and main tournament were as follows. (Note: There were no known century breaks by Bennett, Davis, Dunning, Gross, Houlihan, Parkin, Pulman, Rea, Reardon, Thompson, or Williams.)

- 133, 115, 104, 103, four other century breaks – Alex Higgins
- 124 – Eddie Charlton
- 123, 109, 101 – John Spencer
- 115 – Graham Miles
