= John Phillips (snooker player) =

Scottish snooker player

Personal information
- Born: 1935
- Died: 2008 (aged 72)

Sport
- Country: Scotland
- Sport: Snooker
- Professional: 1981–1983

John Phillips (1935–2008) was a Scottish professional snooker player.

== Career ==
Phillips was born in Springburn. In 1952, he eliminated the reigning champion, Mark Wildman, from the 1952 British youth snooker tournament, before losing to Gary Owen in the second round. He won the Scottish amateur snooker championship in 1958, 1959, 1961, 1964, 1966 and 1971, and was runner-up in 1975. At the 1970 World Amateur Snooker Championship he won four of his six round-robin group matches, which was not enough to qualify for the knockout stage. Whilst an amateur player, he worked as a postman.

He was accepted as a professional by the World Professional Billiards and Snooker Association (WPBSA) in 1981. At the 1982 Scottish Professional Championship, he lost 3–6 to Eddie Sinclair, and his first qualifying round match at the 1982 World Snooker Championship resulted in a 3–9 defeat by Paul Medati. He withdrew from the 1982 Bass and Golden Leisure Classic, the 1982 International Open, the 1982 Professional Players Tournament, and the 1982 UK Championship, before resigning his membership of the WPBSA in 1983. Phillips was known for the high quality of his safety play. He died in 2008, aged 72.
