= Bert Demarco =

Scottish snooker player (1924–2012)

Personal information
- Born: 9 June 1924 Leith, Edinburgh, Scotland
- Died: 17 March 2012 (aged 87)

Sport
- Country: Scotland
- Sport: Snooker

Luigi Umberto "Bert" Demarco (9 June 1924 – 17 March 2012) was a Scottish professional snooker player and billiard hall owner. He competed at the World Amateur Snooker Championship several times, and was a professional snooker player from 1981 to 1993.

== Early life ==
Demarco was born on 9 June 1924 in Leith, the son of Umberto Luigi Demarco who owned a café in Edinburgh, and in 1939 established the Jubilee billiard hall next to it. Luigi, known as Bert from a young age, said that he learnt to play snooker aged 12, whilst on holiday with relatives that had a snooker table. He was introduced to the game by two female cousins and stood on a lemonade crate in order to reach the table. His father enforced a rule that no persons under 18, including his son, could play in the Jubilee hall, although the younger Demarco was allowed to use the billiard tables there on Sundays when the café was closed.

Demarco attended the Holy Cross Academy in Leith. During World War II he joined the Royal Air Force as a volunteer from 1942, and served until 1946, in roles including mechanic and translator, travelling to Africa, Italy, and Palestine. In 1947 he married Maria Paoli, and the couple had three sons.

== Snooker career ==
He won the Scottish amateur snooker championship in 1955 and 1965; and the Scottish billiards title in 1972. His 1965 snooker victory led to an invitation to participate in the 1966 World Amateur Snooker Championship in Karachi, where he finished fifth out of six players. At the 1970 World Amateur Snooker Championship he was sixth of seven players in his group, and in 1972 he was last in his group of four. In 1976 he fared slightly better, fifth of eight in the group. He also took part in the world amateur billiards championship in 1973, but failed to win any of his nine matches.

From the mid-1970s he opened a chain of snooker clubs, and also coached a number of players including Stephen Hendry. Amongst the clubs he owned was Marco's Leisure Centre which, with 65 tables, was the largest snooker hall in Europe.

He played professionally from 1981 to 1993, but never reached as far as the last 32 of a ranking tournament. Demarco died on 17 March 2012 following a stroke. Snooker historian Clive Everton wrote in an obituary that he was "for about 40 years, amongst the best half dozen players in Scotland."

== Career highlights ==
- Scottish Amateur Championship winner in 1955 and 1965; twice runner-up.
- Scottish Open Championship winner in 1956 and 1962; twice runner-up.
- East of Scotland Championship winner in 1953, 1954, 1961, 1963; twice runner-up.
