= John Dunning (snooker player) =

English professional snooker player

Personal information
- Born: 18 April 1927 Morley, West Yorkshire, England
- Died: 11 September 2009 (aged 82) Morley, West Yorkshire, England

Sport
- Country: England
- Sport: Snooker
- Professional: 1969–1997
- Highest ranking: 11 (1976/1977)
- Best ranking finish: 3rd

John Dunning (18 April 1927–11 September 2009_ was an English professional snooker player from Morley, West Yorkshire. He was a professional from 1969 to 1997 and one of three finalists at the International Masters, becoming the became the oldest-ever finalist in a major snooker event, aged 56.

== Early life ==
John Dunning was born on 18 April 1927 He joined the Royal Navy aged 18, and served for two years. He later managed a newsagent's shop and was also a window cleaner.) In the 1964 Television Tournament he defeated George Scott but then lost to Mario Berni in the semi-finals.

Having been Yorkshire amateur champion on eleven occasions, and the CIU Championship in 1963, Dunning turned professional in 1969.

Dunning was the only amateur in the four-player 1968 Willie Smith Trophy, which was contested as Round-robin in which Dunning received 14 points start in each frame from the professionals. Dunning defeated both John Spencer and Jackie Rea by 5-2, but lost 2-5 to Gary Owen and finished as runner-up.ref name="BP68"/>

== Professional career ==
At the four-player 1970 Chester Professional Tournament Dunning lost 3-4 to Rea in the semi-finals.

Dunning played his first World Championship match in 1972, when he lost to John Pulman in the first round, after beating Pat Houlihan and Graham Miles in qualifying. He produced his best performance in 1974, when he reached the quarter-final, subsequently losing his match against Miles 13–15. Dunning's final appearance in the main stages of the event came in 1982.

In 1977, he reached the quarter-finals of the inaugural UK Championship, losing 0–5 to Alex Higgins.

Dunning reached the final of the International Masters in March 1984. The tournament, played on a three-man-group round-robin basis, saw Dunning start as a 7–1 outsider to qualify from his first group. He beat Tony Knowles 2–1 in the opening game, he became favourite, before comfortably winning his next match against Les Dodd. In his semi-final match, he played against Australian Warren King and Terry Griffiths of Wales. Dunning lost to King, but beat Griffiths, which earnt him a place in the final, in which he met Dave Martin and the reigning World Champion and world number one Steve Davis. He lost both matches, finishing third, with Davis winning the title, but received a cheque for £6,000. He became the oldest-ever finalist in a major snooker event, aged 56.

Dunning played his last match as a professional in 1997 at the age of 69. His highest world ranking was 11th, in the 1976/1977 ranking list.

== Personal life ==
He died in Morley, West Yorkshire, on 11 September 2009, aged 82. His funeral was held on 17 September at St Peter's Church, Gildersome, followed by his cremation at Cottingley Crematorium.

Ray Reardon, who defeated Dunning on his way to winning the 1976 World Snooker Championship, said "He was a fine player and an entertaining one, good at attacking and good on the tactical side. He was a charming man with a lovely northern accent." The snooker journalist and historian Clive Everton wrote that Dunning was "the toughest of competitors", but was already 45 when "the professional game had revived sufficiently after a long spell in the doldrums to offer the prospect of worthwhile financial reward."
