= Geoff Foulds =

English snooker player (1939–2025)

Personal information
- Born: 20 November 1939
- Died: c. August 2025 (aged 85)

Sport
- Country: England
- Sport: Snooker
- Professional: 1981–1992
- Highest ranking: 62 (1987/1988)
- Best ranking finish: Last 32 (×1)

Geoffrey Foulds (20 November 1939 – c. August 2025) was an English professional snooker player. He was the father of fellow professional snooker player Neal Foulds.

== Career ==
=== Player ===
Born in 1939, Foulds turned professional in 1981 after a successful amateur career that included winning the London championship in 1971 and each year from 1975 to 1979.

His first two seasons brought little success, but in the 1983–84 snooker season, he reached the last 32 at the UK Championship, where he defeated Steve Duggan 9–8 and Les Dodd 9–7, before losing 1–9 to Steve Davis. The next season saw Foulds progress to the last 48 at the 1985 Classic, beating Bob Chaperon, Frank Jonik and Jack Fitzmaurice to set up a meeting with Mike Hallett. Foulds lost 4–5. A run to the same stage of the 1985 World Snooker Championship, featuring victories over Maurice Parkin, Clive Everton and Colin Roscoe, was ended with a 6–10 loss to Joe Johnson.

Foulds's son, Neal, had joined him in the professional ranks in 1983 and the two met in competition at the 1986 English Professional Championship;

At the 1986 International Open, Foulds defeated Leon Heywood, Vic Harris and Bill Werbeniuk, but was beaten in the last 32, again by his son. This time the match was less evenly contested, as Neal won 5–0. Runs to the last 64 at several other tournaments meant Geoff Foulds entered the next season ranked 62nd, a career best. Foulds recorded his final victory in the last 128 at the 1990 Dubai Classic, defeating Mark Rowing 5–4. A 5–10 loss to Australian Greg Jenkins in qualifying for the 1990 World Championship was Foulds's last match as a professional.

=== Administrator ===
He was a director of the World Professional Billiards and Snooker Association (WPBSA) from December 1989 to 11 April 1997 and served as the Association's chair from December 1996 until 1 April 1997. In 1995 Foulds was part of a three-man expert panel that adjudicated on a WPBSA panel that ruled against Peter Francisco, who had been accused of match fixing to manipulate a 10–2 defeat to Jimmy White at the 1995 World Snooker Championship. Francisco was subsequently banned from snooker activity for five years.

Foulds was the snooker consultant for the 1985 British musical film Billy the Kid and the Green Baize Vampire.

== Death ==
Foulds's death, at the age of 85, was announced on 13 August 2025.
