= Maurice Parkin =

English snooker player (1926–2005)

Personal information
- Born: 26 January 1926 Sheffield, England
- Died: 12 July 2005 (aged 79) Sheffield, England

Sport
- Country: England
- Sport: Snooker
- Professional: 1971–1992
- Highest ranking: 91 (1985–1986)
- Best ranking finish: Last 24 (x2)

Maurice Parkin (26 January 1926 – 12 July 2005) was an English professional snooker player.

== Career ==
Parkin turned professional in September 1968, entering the 1972 World Championship that season. He won his first qualifying round match 11–10 against Geoff Thompson, but was defeated in his next, 3–11 by the young Alex Higgins.

In 1973, Parkin lost 3–9 to Warren Simpson in the last 24, exiting the 1974 tournament at the same stage, 5–8 to Marcus Owen. In 1978, Parkin won his first match in six years, defeating Bernard Bennett 9–4 to set up a last-24 meeting with Bill Werbeniuk, which he lost 2–9.

He never won another match, notably being whitewashed 9–0 by John Virgo in qualifying for the 1979 World Championship. The closest he came to achieving another victory was in the last 128 at the 1987 British Open; there, he led John Hargreaves 4–2, but lost 4–5.

Parkin's final match was symbolic of his career; in qualifying for the 1990 World Championship, he lost 0–10 to nineteen-year-old Barry Pinches. Having been ranked 91st in the world for the 1984/1985 season, he had fallen to 135th by this time, and although he remained on the tour as a non-active member until 1992, Parkin left the professional game in 1990.

== Personal life and death ==
Parkin was born in Sheffield, England, on 26 January 1926. He died there on 12 July 2005, aged 79, after a long illness.
