= Mike Watterson =

English promoter and snooker player

Personal information
- Born: 26 August 1942 Chesterfield, Derbyshire, England
- Died: 8 March 2019 (aged 76)

Sport
- Country: England
- Sport: Snooker
- Professional: 1981–1995
- Highest ranking: 34 (1984/1985)
- Best ranking finish: Last 16 (x1)

George Michael Edwin Watterson (26 August 1942 – 8 March 2019) was an English professional snooker player, businessman, sports promoter and television commentator.

Watterson established the UK Snooker Championship and moved the World Championship to the Crucible Theatre, where it has remained ever since. He also created the World Professional Darts Championship, staged the first floodlit cricket in Britain and had a stint as chairman of Derby County.

== Early life ==
George Michael Edwin Watterson was born in Chesterfield, Derbyshire on 26 August 1942, the son of steelworker George Watterson and Olive (née Pilkington), and was the third of four children.

== Business activities ==
Watterson's early business career saw him work as a wages clerk and then as a car dealer. He was a salesman with the Sheffield-based Vauxhall dealers, Bentley Brothers, and was one of the first people in the country to sell the Vauxhall Viva when it was introduced in 1963.

In 1977, his late wife, Carole, went to see a play at the Crucible Theatre, Sheffield, and suggested to her husband that it would make the ideal setting for snooker. Knowing that there was a real danger that there would be no World Snooker Championship that year, Watterson spoke to the theatre's then-manager, Arnold Eliiman, and asked if he could stage the tournament there. Watterson rented the theatre for £6,600 for two weeks, and had to make a bid to the snooker association, guaranteeing them £17,000 from the tournament. It was accepted and the tournament remains at the now world-famous venue to this day, renowned for its intimate atmosphere.

Later that same year, he staged the inaugural UK Championship, and within a few years had founded the British Open and International Open, arranging sponsorship and TV contracts with the BBC and ITV. In 1979 he created the first World Cup, sponsored by State Express. In effect, he was involved with the creation of most of the major professional tournaments that sprung up during the 1980s, many of which still exist to this day.

However, in 1983 he was told by the WPBSA that he was no longer needed as a promoter. According to Gordon Burn's book Pocket Money, every time he missed a meeting, he found he had lost another tournament. In a relatively short period of time, he was squeezed out of the game, as the WPBSA started promoting the events themselves.

Watterson laid the blame for this on the late former WPBSA chairman and snooker manager Del Simmons, as well as his former employee Paul Hatherell, and former player come WPBSA chairman Rex Williams. He said that when he lost the World Championship, it was like someone had killed one of his children.

At various times, he also managed some well-known professional snooker players including Kirk Stevens, Cliff Thorburn, and Bill Werbeniuk.

Watterson also created the BDO World Darts Championship, an idea he came up with while sat in a barber's chair in 1977. Imperial Tobacco, who already sponsored the World Snooker Championship with their Embassy brand were also interested and with Watterson promoting the event Imperial also signed up to the darts version, which they were to sponsor for 25 years. Once again, Watterson arranged the sponsorship and TV contract with the BBC. The tournament was originally held at the Heart of the Midlands nightclub in Nottingham, which belonged to his late friend Derrick Wright. He then took it to Jollees in Stoke-on-Trent.

Watterson created the system of sets and legs, creating a climax every 20 minutes and thereby maintaining the interest of TV viewers, which is used in darts and bowls to this day.

However, a breakdown in relationship with BDO chairman Olly Croft and the late Peter Dyke of Imperial Tobacco saw him exit the sport. A situation mirrored when the world's top players broke away to form the rival Professional Darts Corporation.

Elsewhere, he staged the first floodlit cricket in Britain in 1980, which was a six-a-side tournament between Derbyshire, Yorkshire, Nottinghamshire and Kent, staged at Bramall Lane stadium in Sheffield.

In 1981 he created the first UK Indoor Bowls Championship at the Preston Guild Hall. He changed the format to 21 ends, to three sets of first to seven ends.

He took over promotion of ITV's Pro-Celebrity Snooker, held in Leeds, securing new backing after Canadian Club withdrew their sponsorship.

== Football Club chairman ==
Watterson served as Chairman of Derby County Football Club in the early 1980s, which saw him bring Brian Clough's former assistant manager at arch rivals Nottingham Forest, Peter Taylor out of retirement to become manager of the team. Within a short period, Archie Gemmill and John Robertson had made the journey across from Forest. Battles in the boardroom and a growing hooligan fan problem led to Watterson leaving within a few years.

In June 1983 he was approached by Chesterfield F.C. secretary Bob Pepper and the club solicitor Roger Woodhead, who advised him that the club was being wound up in the High Court in London. Settling the debts to the Inland Revenue and Customs and Excise, totalling £91,000, the club was saved. He became Vice-Chairman of Chesterfield until November that year, later returning as chairman, which lasted just over a year.

== Snooker career ==
Watterson won the national breaks competition for 1975-76, and the Working Men's Club and Institute Union snooker championship in 1979. He represented England in the Home Internationals series in 1979 and 1980, and became a professional player in 1981. His highest ranking achieved as a professional was 34th.

== Snooker commentator ==
While promoting ITV's Pro-Celebrity Snooker in the early 1980s (a series presented by Mike Smith, a former master of ceremonies at major snooker events who went on to have a long career at Eurosport), Watterson commentated on one episode alongside Rex Williams, however his main career as a commentator began in 1989 with Eurosport, then jointly owned by Sky Television plc and the EBU.

His regular commentary partners were Canadian Jim Wych and Willie Thorne. The event he most enjoyed commentating on was the one-off Mita World Masters in 1991, an innovative event created especially for television by Barry Hearn. He also commentated on the British Open and International Open for several years, when the coverage moved from ITV to Sky. When Sky moved its sports programming from Eurosport to Sky Sports, which it owned outright, Watterson continued in the role.

He stepped down from Sky in 1994 to spend more time enjoying his property in Spain during the winter months, briefly returning to commentary with Eurosport for a short while after that.

== Later activities ==
Watterson felt deeply hurt by the way snooker disposed of his services in the early-mid-1980s and never returned to business full-time again. He continued to hold a significant share portfolio and owned property in Britain and Spain. He remained in regular contact with his friend, snooker commentator and journalist Clive Everton.

In November 2017, Watterson withdrew his support for Barry Hearn's chairmanship of World Snooker, after Hearn failed to honour a £55,000 debt owed to him by the then-WPBSA board dating back to the 1980s.

Watterson died of pneumonia on 8 March 2019.
