= Eddie Sinclair =

Scottish snooker player

Personal information
- Born: 5 May 1937 Knightswood, Glasgow, Scotland
- Died: 23 January 2005 (aged 67)

Sport
- Country: Scotland
- Sport: Snooker
- Professional: 1979–1993
- Highest ranking: 26 (1982–1984)
- Best ranking finish: Last 16 (x1)

Eddie Sinclair (5 May 1937 – 23 January 2005) was a Scottish professional snooker player.

== Career ==
Sinclair turned professional in 1979 at the relatively advanced age of 42, reaching a high ranking of 26th in 1982 and holding that position for two years. He won the 1980 and 1982 editions of the Scottish Professional Championship, beating Chris Ross 11–6 in the former and Ian Black 11–7 in the latter, and reached the final in 1983 and 1985, losing to Murdo MacLeod 11-9 and 10–2.

Sinclair enjoyed his best performance in a ranking event at the 1982 Professional Players Tournament, where he beat the veteran Fred Davis 5–2 and Jim Meadowcroft 5–3 before being defeated 5–3 by Terry Griffiths in the last 16. He also appeared in the last 32 of seven ranking tournaments and reached the semi-final of the 1987 Scottish Professional Championship, losing this time to Jim Donnelly 6–4.

By 1987, Sinclair had fallen out of the top 64 in the world rankings and his decline continued in the following six years. He played in his final event, ranked 220th, against Gerard Greene in qualifying for the 1993 Benson & Hedges Championship, losing the match 5–4 and his professional status immediately thereafter.

== Personal life ==
Having had no involvement with professional snooker since his retirement, Sinclair died in January 2005, aged 67.
