= Jim Meadowcroft =

English snooker player, coach and commentator

Personal information
- Born: 15 December 1946 Bacup, Lancashire, England
- Died: 25 September 2015 (aged 68)

Sport
- Country: England
- Sport: Snooker
- Professional: 1972–1993
- Highest ranking: 12 (1976/77)
- Best ranking finish: Quarter-final (x1)

James Meadowcroft (15 December 1946 – 25 September 2015), better known as Jim Meadowcroft, was an English professional snooker player who latterly was a coach and a commentator on the game.

His most successful years were during the 1970s; he was ranked number 12 in the world in 1976–77 and reached the second round of the world championship three times. Meadowcroft is the author of Higgins, Taylor and Me and served as a director of pro snooker's governing body the WPBSA.

Meadowcroft reached the last 16 of the World Championship in 1974, however he lost 10–16 to 6 times world champion Ray Reardon. He went one step further in 1976, reaching the quarter-final by beating Rex Williams 15–7, before he was beaten 8–15 by Perrie Mans. He also progressed to the quarter-final of the 1977 UK Championship (The inaugural edition of the tournament), beating Pat Houlihan and Ray Reardon both by 5–4 scoreline, before being beaten by eventual winner Patsy Fagan, once again by a 5–4 score.

He qualified for the World Championship in 1980 but lost 10–2 to John Virgo. His final appearance at the Crucible was in 1983.

On 27 January 1982, Meadowcroft made breaks of 105, 115, 117 and 125 (total 462) in four consecutive frames at the Connaught Leisure Centre, Worthing.
