= Ray Edmonds =

English billiards & snooker player (born 1936)

Personal information
- Born: 25 April 1936 (age 90) Grimsby, Lincolnshire, England

Sport
- Country: England
- Sport: Snooker
- Professional: 1978–1995
- Highest ranking: 28 (1980–1982)

Earnest Raymond Edmonds (born 25 April 1936 in Grimsby, Lincolnshire), better known as Ray Edmonds, is a former English professional player of English billiards and snooker. He twice won the World Amateur Snooker title, and won the World Professional Billiards Championship in 1985.

== Playing career ==
Edmonds first played snooker as an amateur, winning the World Amateur crown in 1972 and 1974. After turning professional he reached the main stages World Snooker Championship on four occasions, in 1980, 1981, 1985 and 1986, on each occasion losing in the first round. He was as a semi-finalist at the 1981 English Professional Championship, and runner-up in the invitational 1982 Bass and Golden Leisure Classic.

Edmonds became World Professional Billiards Champion in 1985. At the 1988 Grand Prix (snooker), he reached the last-16 round.

In the qualifying competition for the 1994 World Snooker Championship, he lost 3–5 to Surinder Gill, and the following year he lost 4–5 to Darren Limburg. In 1995, he resigned from the board of the World Professional Billiards and Snooker Association after serving on it for 14 years.

== Post-retirement ==
Edmonds set up the Ray Edmonds Snooker Centre in Grimsby in December 1983. He also worked as a snooker commentator with both ITV and the BBC until retiring in 2004.
