= Pat Houlihan =

British snooker player (1929–2006)

Personal information
- Born: 7 November 1929 Deptford, England
- Died: 8 November 2006 (aged 77)

Sport
- Country: England
- Sport: Snooker
- Professional: 1971–1993
- Highest ranking: 18 (1978–1979)
- Best ranking finish: Last 16 (x1)

Patrick Houlihan (7 November 1929 – 8 November 2006) was an English snooker player. He was born in Deptford, London.

Houlihan turned professional in 1971 at the age of 42 after many years as an amateur, including beating future world champion John Spencer 11–3 at Blackpool Tower during the 1965 English Amateur Championship final. Additionally, he lifted the BA&CC television tournament, one of snooker's first televised events. As English champion, Houlihan was due to compete in the 1965 IBSF World Snooker Championship in Karachi, but the tournament was postponed due to the Indo-Pakistani War of 1965. In 1966, Spencer, who by then had won the 1966 English Amateur title, rather than Houlihan, was the representative at the rescheduled IBSF tournament. In the meantime, Houlihan had been imprisoned for four months for his involvement in the burglary of a warehouse.

His move to becoming a professional had been stymied by world champion turned snooker star, Joe Davis, who was responsible for selecting new professionals and disapproved of amateurs such as Houlihan, who had played matches at various snooker clubs for money.

During his professional career, his highest position in the world rankings was 18th, which he reached in 1979. He played in the main stages of the World Snooker Championship twice: in 1973 when he lost 3–16 to the defending champion Alex Higgins, and at the Crucible Theatre, in 1978 when he lost 8–13 to Cliff Thorburn in the first round. He retired from professional snooker in 1993.

Jimmy White once referred to Houlihan as "the greatest [snooker] player I've ever seen", and Houlihan's style is seen as an influence on White's own attacking style of snooker.
