= List of players to appear in the World Snooker Championship =

This article lists every player to have competed in the World Snooker Championship (not including qualifying matches) since 1969, when the championship reverted to a knockout format, following the title being decided in a series of challenge matches from 1964 to 1968.

== Players ==
Best refers to each player's best finish.

Player	Country	Debut	Last appearance	Total appearances	Best	Ref.
John Pulman	England	1969	1980	11	Runner-up (×1 – 1970)	
John Spencer	England	1969	1986	18	Winner (×3 – 1969, 1971, 1977)	
Rex Williams	England	1969	1988	15	Semi-final (×3 – 1969, 1972, 1974)	
Bernard Bennett	England	1969	1974	4	Quarter-final (×1 – 1969)	
Gary Owen	Wales	1969	1976	7	Runner-up (×1 – 1969)	
Jackie Rea	Northern Ireland	1969	1973	4	Quarter-final (×2 – 1969, 1970)	
Fred Davis	England	1969	1984	14	Semi-final (×3 – 1969, 1974, 1978)	
Ray Reardon	Wales	1969	1987	19	Winner (×6 – 1970, 1973, 1974, 1975, 1976, 1978)	
David Taylor	England	1970	1987	17	Semi-final (×1 – 1980)	
Eddie Charlton	Australia	1971	1992	21	Runner-up (×2 – 1973, 1975)	
Warren Simpson	Australia	1971	1975	4	Runner-up (×1 – 1971)	
Paddy Morgan	Australia	1971	1975	3	Round Robin (×1 – 1971)	
Perrie Mans	South Africa	1971	1986	13	Runner-up (×1 – 1978)	
Norman Squire	Australia	1971	1971	1	Round Robin (×1 – 1971)	
Alex Higgins	Northern Ireland	1972	1994	19	Winner (×2 – 1972, 1982)	
John Dunning	England	1972	1982	7	Quarter-final (×1 – 1974)	
Pat Houlihan	England	1973	1978	2	Last 16 (×2 – 1973, 1978)	
David Greaves	England	1973	1975	2	2nd round (×1 – 1973)	
Graham Miles	England	1973	1984	12	Runner-up (×1 – 1974)	
Geoff Thompson	England	1973	1974	2	1st round (×2 – 1973, 1974)	
Ron Gross	England	1973	1973	1	1st round (×1 – 1973)	
Maurice Parkin	England	1973	1974	2	1st round (×2 – 1973, 1974)	
Jim Meadowcroft	England	1973	1983	7	Quarter-final (×1 – 1976)	
Cliff Thorburn	Canada	1973	1994	19	Winner (×1 – 1980)	
Dennis Taylor	Northern Ireland	1973	1994	21	Winner (×1 – 1985)	
Kingsley Kennerley	England	1974	1974	1 (Note: Kennerley also qualified in 1973 but withdrew.)	1st round (×1 – 1974)	
Marcus Owen	Wales	1974	1974	1	Quarter-final (×1 – 1974)	
Bill Werbeniuk	Canada	1974	1988	13	Quarter-final (×4 – 1978, 1979, 1981, 1983)	
Ian Anderson	Australia	1974	1975	2	2nd round (×1 – 1975)	
Sydney Lee	England	1974	1974	1	1st round (×1 – 1974)	
Ron Mares	Australia	1975	1975	1	1st round (×1 – 1975)	
Phil Tarrant	Australia	1975	1975	1	1st round (×1 – 1975)	
Rex King	Australia	1975	1975	1	1st round (×1 – 1975)	
Lou Condo	Australia	1975	1975	1	1st round (×1 – 1975)	
Patsy Fagan	Ireland	1977	1985	5	Quarter-final (×1 – 1978)	
John Virgo	England	1977	1991	14	Semi-final (×1 – 1979)	
Willie Thorne	England	1977	1996	19	Quarter-final (×2 – 1982, 1986)	
Doug Mountjoy	Wales	1977	1993	17	Runner-up (×1 – 1981)	
Steve Davis	England	1979	2010	30	Winner (×6 – 1981, 1983, 1984, 1987, 1988, 1989)	
Kirk Stevens	Canada	1979	1988	10	Semi-final (×2 – 1980, 1984)	
Terry Griffiths	Wales	1979	1997	19	Winner (×1 – 1979)	
Tony Meo	England	1980	1991	11	Semi-final (×1 – 1989)	
Cliff Wilson	Wales	1980	1990	8	1st round (×8 – 1980, 1981, 1982, 1983, 1986, 1988, 1989, 1990)	
Jim Wych	Canada	1980	1992	4	Quarter-final (×2 – 1980, 1992)	
Ray Edmonds	England	1980	1986	4	1st round (×4 – 1980, 1981, 1985, 1986)	
Jimmy White	England	1981	2006	25	Runner-up (×6 – 1984, 1990, 1991, 1992, 1993, 1994)	
Tony Knowles	England	1981	1992	12	Semi-final (×3 – 1983, 1985, 1986)	
Dave Martin	England	1981	1986	4	1st round (×4 – 1981, 1982, 1983, 1986)	
John Bear	Canada	1982	1982	1	1st round (×1 – 1982)	
Silvino Francisco	South Africa	1982	1989	8	Quarter-final (×1 – 1982)	
Dean Reynolds	England	1982	1993	11	Quarter-final (×1 – 1989)	
Mike Hallett	England	1982	1992	11	Quarter-final (×2 – 1987, 1989)	
Jim Donnelly	Scotland	1982	1982	1	1st round (×1 – 1982)	
Jack Fitzmaurice	England	1982	1982	1	1st round (×1 – 1982)	
Les Dodd	England	1983	1994	3	1st round (×3 – 1983, 1993, 1994)	
Mark Wildman	England	1983	1983	1	1st round (×1 – 1983)	
John Campbell	Australia	1983	1988	5	2nd round (×1 – 1986)	
Ian Black	Scotland	1983	1983	1	1st round (×1 – 1983)	
Mick Fisher	England	1983	1983	1	1st round (×1 – 1983)	
Eugene Hughes	Ireland	1983	1989	5	2nd round (×1 – 1986)	
Warren King	Australia	1984	1991	4	1st round (×4 – 1984, 1987, 1988, 1991)	
Paul Mifsud	Malta	1984	1984	1	1st round (×1 – 1984)	
Eddie Sinclair	Scotland	1984	1984	1	1st round (×1 – 1984)	
Marcel Gauvreau	Canada	1984	1984	1	1st round (×1 – 1984)	
Roy Andrewartha	Wales	1984	1984	1	1st round (×1 – 1984)	
Neal Foulds	England	1984	1996	12	Semi-final (×1 – 1987)	
Joe Johnson	England	1984	1991	8	Winner (×1 – 1986)	
John Parrott	England	1984	2007	23	Winner (×1 – 1991)	
Mario Morra	Canada	1984	1984	1	1st round (×1 – 1984)	
Tony Jones	England	1985	1993	4	2nd round (×1 – 1991)	
Murdo MacLeod	Scotland	1985	1987	2	2nd round (×1 – 1987)	
Dene O'Kane	New Zealand	1985	1996	6	Quarter-final (×2 – 1987, 1992)	
Wayne Jones	Wales	1985	1990	4	2nd round (×1 – 1989)	
Danny Fowler	England	1986	1993	4	1st round (×4 – 1986, 1988, 1990, 1993)	
Stephen Hendry	Scotland	1986	2012	27	Winner (×7 – 1990, 1992, 1993, 1994, 1995, 1996, 1999)	
Barry West	England	1987	1988	2	1st round (×2 – 1987, 1988)	
Steve Longworth	England	1987	1988	2	2nd round (×1 – 1987)	
Jon Wright	England	1987	1987	1	1st round (×1 – 1987)	
Mark Bennett	Wales	1987	1991	3	1st round (×3 – 1988, 1990, 1991)	
Bob Chaperon	Canada	1988	1992	3	1st round (×3 – 1988, 1989, 1992)	
Tony Drago	Malta	1988	2005	13	Quarter-final (×1 – 1988)	
Peter Francisco	South Africa	1988	1995	5	1st round (×5 – 1988, 1989, 1990, 1992, 1995)	
Steve James	England	1988	1999	9	Semi-final (×1 – 1991)	
Steve Newbury	Wales	1989	1991	3	1st round (×3 – 1989, 1990, 1991)	
Darren Morgan	Wales	1989	2000	10	Semi-final (×1 – 1994)	
Steve Duggan	England	1989	1989	1	2nd round (×1 – 1989)	
David Roe	England	1989	2001	6	2nd round (×2 – 1989, 1995)	
Joe O'Boye	Northern Ireland	1989	1989	1	1st round (×1 – 1989)	
Paddy Browne	Ireland	1989	1989	1	1st round (×1 – 1989)	
Gary Wilkinson	England	1989	2003	10	Quarter-final (×2 – 1991, 1995)	
Brady Gollan	Canada	1990	1990	1	1st round (×1 – 1990)	
Nigel Gilbert	England	1990	1995	3	1st round (×3 – 1990, 1991, 1995)	
Tony Chappel	Wales	1990	1990	1	1st round (×1 – 1990)	
Alain Robidoux	Canada	1990	1999	9	Semi-final (×1 – 1997)	
Craig Edwards	England	1991	1991	1	1st round (×1 – 1991)	
Ken Doherty	Ireland	1991	2014	19	Winner (×1 – 1997)	
Ian Graham	England	1991	1991	1	1st round (×1 – 1991)	
Barry Pinches	England	1991	2005	3	2nd round (×1 – 2004)	
Martin Clark	England	1991	1996	5	2nd round (×3 – 1991, 1992, 1993)	
Alan McManus	Scotland	1991	2020	21	Semi-final (×3 – 1992, 1993, 2016)	
Nick Dyson	England	1991	2001	2	1st round (×2 – 1991, 2001)	
Robert Marshall	England	1991	1991	1	1st round (×1 – 1991)	
Stephen Murphy	Ireland	1992	1992	1	1st round (×1 – 1992)	
Mark Johnston-Allen	England	1992	1992	1	1st round (×1 – 1992)	
Peter Ebdon	England	1992	2017	24	Winner (×1 – 2002)	
James Wattana	Thailand	1992	2006	13	Semi-final (×2 – 1993, 1997)	
Jason Ferguson	England	1992	1998	3	1st round (×3 – 1992, 1996, 1998)	
Mick Price	England	1992	1997	3	2nd round (×1 – 1992)	
Chris Small	Scotland	1992	2005	8	2nd round (×3 – 1992, 1999, 2001)	
Nigel Bond	England	1992	2009	15	Runner-up (×1 – 1995)	
Shaun Mellish	England	1993	1993	1	1st round (×1 – 1993)	
Joe Swail	Northern Ireland	1993	2009	12	Semi-final (×2 – 2000, 2001)	
Stephen O'Connor	Ireland	1993	1993	1	1st round (×1 – 1993)	
Spencer Dunn	England	1993	1993	1	1st round (×1 – 1993)	
Ronnie O'Sullivan	England	1993	2026	34	Winner (×7 – 2001, 2004, 2008, 2012, 2013, 2020, 2022)	
John Giles	England	1993	1993	1	1st round (×1 – 1993)	
Brian Morgan	England	1993	1997	4	2nd round (×1 – 1994)	
Karl Payne	England	1993	1993	1	1st round (×1 – 1993)	
Surinder Gill	England	1994	1994	1	1st round (×1 – 1994)	
Dave Harold	England	1994	2011	11	Quarter-final (×1 – 1996)	
Billy Snaddon	Scotland	1994	2001	5	1st round (×5 – 1994, 1995, 1997, 2000, 2001)	
Drew Henry	Scotland	1994	2005	6	2nd round (×2 – 2000, 2003)	
Mark Davis	England	1994	2021	12	2nd round (×3 – 1995, 2010, 2013)	
Mark King	England	1994	2020	15	2nd round (×7 – 1998, 1999, 2001, 2002, 2008, 2009, 2013)	
Gary Ponting	England	1994	1994	1	1st round (×1 – 1994)	
Fergal O'Brien	Ireland	1994	2017	10	Quarter-final (×1 – 2000)	
Anthony Davies	Wales	1994	2002	3	2nd round (×1 – 2002)	
Paul Cavney	England	1995	1995	1	1st round (×1 – 1995)	
Stefan Mazrocis	England	1995	1997	2	2nd round (×1 – 1997)	
Rod Lawler	England	1995	1996	2	2nd round (×1 – 1996)	
John Higgins	Scotland	1995	2026	32	Winner (×4 – 1998, 2007, 2009, 2011)	
Tai Pichit	Thailand	1995	1995	1	1st round (×1 – 1995)	
Andy Hicks	England	1995	2007	8	Semi-final (×1 – 1995)	
Stephen Lee	England	1995	2012	17	Semi-final (×1 – 2003)	
Anthony Hamilton	England	1996	2008	12 (Note: Hamilton also qualified in 2020 but withdrew.)	Quarter-final (×4 – 2000, 2002, 2004, 2007)	
Nick Terry	England	1996	1996	1	1st round (×1 – 1996)	
Jamie Burnett	Scotland	1996	2014	4	1st round (×4 – 1996, 2009, 2011, 2014)	
Euan Henderson	Scotland	1996	1996	1	1st round (×1 – 1996)	
Jimmy Michie	England	1996	1996	1	1st round (×1 – 1996)	
Mark Williams	Wales	1997	2026	28	Winner (×3 – 2000, 2003, 2018)	
Lee Walker	Wales	1997	2004	3	Quarter-final (×1 – 1997)	
David McLellan	Scotland	1997	1997	1	1st round (×1 – 1997)	
Bradley Jones	England	1997	1997	1	1st round (×1 – 1997)	
Graham Horne	Scotland	1997	1997	1	1st round (×1 – 1997)	
Dominic Dale	Wales	1997	2024	10	Quarter-final (×2 – 2000, 2014)	
Graeme Dott	Scotland	1997	2019	20	Winner (×1 – 2006)	
Alfie Burden	England	1998	1998	1	1st round (×1 – 1998)	
Simon Bedford	England	1998	1998	1	1st round (×1 – 1998)	
Quinten Hann	Australia	1998	2005	6	2nd round (×2 – 2002, 2003)	
David Gray	England	1998	2006	6	Quarter-final (×1 – 2004)	
Peter Lines	England	1998	1998	1	1st round (×1 – 1998)	
Terry Murphy	Northern Ireland	1998	1999	2	1st round (×2 – 1998, 1999)	
Jason Prince	Northern Ireland	1998	1998	1	1st round (×1 – 1998)	
Matthew Stevens	Wales	1998	2026	19	Runner-up (×2 – 2000, 2005)	
Gerard Greene	Northern Ireland	1999	2010	5	1st round (×5 – 1999, 2003, 2005, 2009, 2010)	
Nick Walker	England	1999	1999	1	2nd round (×1 – 1999)	
Marco Fu	Hong Kong	1999	2018	18	Semi-final (×2 – 2006, 2016)	
Ian McCulloch	England	1999	2007	5	Semi-final (×1 – 2005)	
Paul Hunter	England	1999	2006	8	Semi-final (×1 – 2003)	
Joe Perry	England	1999	2023	17	Semi-final (×1 – 2008)	
John Lardner	Scotland	1999	1999	1	1st round (×1 – 1999)	
Leo Fernandez	Ireland	1999	1999	1	1st round (×1 – 1999)	
Stuart Bingham	England	2000	2024	18	Winner (×1 – 2015)	
John Read	England	2000	2000	1	1st round (×1 – 2000)	
Kristján Helgason	Iceland	2000	2000	1	1st round (×1 – 2000)	
Marcus Campbell	Scotland	2001	2013	4	1st round (×4 – 2001, 2010, 2011, 2013)	
Patrick Wallace	Northern Ireland	2001	2001	1	Quarter-final (×1 – 2001)	
Michael Judge	Ireland	2001	2008	3	2nd round (×1 – 2001)	
Sean Storey	England	2001	2003	2	2nd round (×1 – 2003)	
Robin Hull	Finland	2002	2015	3	1st round (×3 – 2002, 2014, 2015)	
Mike Dunn	England	2002	2002	1	1st round (×1 – 2002)	
Shaun Murphy	England	2002	2026	24	Winner (×1 – 2005)	
Robert Milkins	England	2002	2024	10	2nd round (×5 – 2002, 2013, 2018, 2023, 2024)	
Ali Carter	England	2003	2026	22	Runner-up (×2 – 2008, 2012)	
Stuart Pettman	England	2003	2010	3	1st round (×3 – 2003, 2004, 2010)	
Ryan Day	Wales	2004	2025	16	Quarter-final (×3 – 2008, 2009, 2012)	
Stephen Maguire	Scotland	2004	2024	20	Semi-final (×2 – 2007, 2012)	
Michael Holt	England	2005	2016	8	2nd round (×2 – 2005, 2016)	
Mark Selby	England	2005	2026	22	Winner (×4 – 2014, 2016, 2017, 2021)	
Neil Robertson	Australia	2005	2026	21	Winner (×1 – 2010)	
Barry Hawkins	England	2006	2026	20	Runner-up (×1 – 2013)	
Joe Delaney	Ireland	2007	2007	1	1st round (×1 – 2007)	
Ding Junhui	China	2007	2026	20	Runner-up (×1 – 2016)	
Judd Trump	England	2007	2026	17	Winner (×1 – 2019)	
Mark Allen	Northern Ireland	2007	2026	20	Semi-final (×3 – 2009, 2023, 2026)	
David Gilbert	England	2007	2026	12	Semi-final (×2 – 2019, 2024)	
Jamie Cope	England	2008	2014	5	2nd round (×2 – 2009, 2011)	
Liang Wenbo	China	2008	2021	8	Quarter-final (×1 – 2008)	
Liu Chuang	China	2008	2012	2	1st round (×2 – 2008, 2012)	
Rory McLeod	England	2009	2017	3	2nd round (×2 – 2011, 2017)	
Martin Gould	England	2009	2021	11	2nd round (×3 – 2010, 2011, 2020)	
Ricky Walden	England	2009	2024	10	Semi-final (×1 – 2013)	
Andrew Higginson	England	2009	2012	2	2nd round (×1 – 2012)	
Tom Ford	England	2010	2024	5	2nd round (×1 – 2024)	
Zhang Anda	China	2010	2026	6	1st round (×6 – 2010, 2015, 2016, 2024, 2025, 2026)	
Andrew Pagett	Wales	2011	2011	1	1st round (×1 – 2011)	
Jimmy Robertson	England	2011	2023	5	1st round (×5 – 2011, 2015, 2017, 2018, 2023)	
Cao Yupeng	China	2012	2012	1	2nd round (×1 – 2012)	
Luca Brecel	Belgium	2012	2025	8	Winner (×1 – 2023)	
Jamie Jones	Wales	2012	2024	6	Quarter-final (×1 – 2012)	
Jack Lisowski	England	2013	2024	8	Quarter-final (×1 – 2022)	
Michael White	Wales	2013	2022	4	Quarter-final (×1 – 2013)	
Dechawat Poomjaeng	Thailand	2013	2013	1	2nd round (×1 – 2013)	
Ben Woollaston	England	2013	2025	2	2nd round (×1 – 2025)	
Matthew Selt	England	2013	2025	5	1st round (×5 – 2013, 2015, 2021, 2023, 2025)	
Sam Baird	England	2013	2016	2	2nd round (×1 – 2016)	
Xiao Guodong	China	2014	2026	5	2nd round (×2 – 2017, 2025, 2026)	
Michael Wasley	England	2014	2014	1	2nd round (×1 – 2014)	
Kyren Wilson	England	2014	2026	12	Winner (×1 – 2024)	
Robbie Williams	England	2014	2024	4	1st round (×4 – 2014, 2015, 2016, 2024)	
Kurt Maflin	Norway	2015	2021	3	Quarter-final (×1 – 2020)	
Anthony McGill	Scotland	2015	2023	9	Semi-final (×1 – 2020)	
Craig Steadman	England	2015	2015	1	1st round (×1 – 2015)	
Stuart Carrington	England	2015	2018	3	1st round (×3 – 2015, 2017, 2018)	
Mitchell Mann	England	2016	2016	1	1st round (×1 – 2016)	
Gary Wilson	England	2017	2026	6	Semi-final (×1 – 2019)	
David Grace	England	2017	2023	2	1st round (×2 – 2017, 2023)	
Yan Bingtao	China	2017	2022	4	Quarter-final (×1 – 2022)	
Zhou Yuelong	China	2017	2026	4	2nd round (×1 – 2019)	
Noppon Saengkham	Thailand	2017	2023	4	2nd round (×2 – 2020, 2022)	
Lyu Haotian	China	2018	2024	4	2nd round (×1 – 2018)	
Liam Highfield	England	2018	2026	4	1st round (×4 – 2018, 2021, 2022, 2026)	
Thepchaiya Un-Nooh	Thailand	2018	2022	4	1st round (×4 – 2018, 2019, 2020, 2022)	
Chris Wakelin	England	2018	2026	5	Quarter-final (×1 – 2025)	
Michael Georgiou	Cyprus	2019	2019	1	1st round (×1 – 2019)	
Tian Pengfei	China	2019	2021	2	1st round (×2 – 2019, 2021)	
Luo Honghao	China	2019	2019	1	1st round (×1 – 2019)	
Zhao Xintong	China	2019	2026	4	Winner (×1 – 2025)	
James Cahill	England	2019	2019	1	2nd round (×1 – 2019)	
Li Hang	China	2019	2019	1	1st round (×1 – 2019)	
Scott Donaldson	Scotland	2019	2022	2	1st round (×2 – 2019, 2022)	
Ashley Carty	England	2020	2020	1	1st round (×1 – 2020)	
Elliot Slessor	England	2020	2023	2	1st round (×2 – 2020, 2023)	
Jordan Brown	Northern Ireland	2020	2020	1	1st round (×1 – 2020)	
Jamie Clarke	Wales	2020	2022	2	2nd round (×1 – 2020)	
Alexander Ursenbacher	Switzerland	2020	2020	1	1st round (×1 – 2020)	
Mark Joyce	England	2021	2021	1	1st round (×1 – 2021)	
Sam Craigie	England	2021	2021	1	1st round (×1 – 2021)	
Jackson Page	Wales	2022	2024	2	2nd round (×1 – 2022)	
Ashley Hugill	England	2022	2022	1	1st round (×1 – 2022)	
Hossein Vafaei	Iran	2022	2026	5	Quarter-final (×1 – 2026)	
Pang Junxu	China	2023	2026	4	2nd round (×1 – 2025)	
Wu Yize	China	2023	2026	3	Winner (×1 – 2026)	
Jak Jones	Wales	2023	2026	4	Runner-up (×1 – 2024)	
Fan Zhengyi	China	2023	2026	3	1st round (×3 – 2023, 2025, 2026)	
Si Jiahui	China	2023	2026	4	Semi-final (×1 – 2023)	
Joe O'Connor	England	2024	2025	2	2nd round (×1 – 2024)	
Lei Peifan	China	2025	2026	2	2nd round (×1 – 2025)	
Zak Surety	England	2025	2025	1	1st round (×1 – 2025)	
Daniel Wells	Wales	2025	2025	1	1st round (×1 – 2025)	
He Guoqiang	China	2026	2026	1	1st round (×1 – 2026)	
Liam Pullen	England	2026	2026	1	1st round (×1 – 2026)	
Stan Moody	England	2026	2026	1	1st round (×1 – 2026)	
Antoni Kowalski	Poland	2026	2026	1	1st round (×1 – 2026)	
