= 1967–68 snooker season =

Snooker season

Details
- Duration: July 1967 – June 1968
- Tournaments: 4 (non-ranking)

Triple Crown winners
- World Championship: John Pulman (ENG)

The 1967–68 snooker season, the last season before the modern era of snooker, (Note: The "modern era" of snooker is understood to have started in 1969, when the World Championship reverted to a knockout format.) was a series of snooker tournaments played between July 1967 and June 1968. The following table outlines the results for the season's events.

== New professional players ==
The following players turned professional during the season: Gary Owen and Ray Reardon. Billiards and Snooker magazine reported in June 1968 that Alex Higgins had turned professional, but in October 1968 he was competing as an amateur.

== Calendar ==
| Date (Note: Dates use the mm-dd date format.) | | | Rank | Tournament name | Venue | City | Winner | Runner-up | Score | Ref. |
|---|---|---|---|---|---|---|---|---|---|---|
| 07-?? | 07-?? | AUS | NR | Australian Professional Championship | Junior Rugby League Club | Sydney | Eddie Charlton (AUS) | Warren Simpson (AUS) | 7–1 | |
| 01–09 | 01–13 | ENG | NR | Willie Smith Trophy | Queen's Hall | Leeds | Gary Owen (WAL) | John Dunning (ENG) | Round robin | |
| 03-04 | 03-09 | ENG | NR | World Snooker Championship (Note: Challenge match) | Co-operative Hall | Bolton | John Pulman (ENG) | Eddie Charlton (AUS) | 39–34 | |
