= 1964–65 snooker season =

Details
- Duration: July 1964 – June 1965
- Tournaments: 3 (non-ranking)

Triple Crown winners
- World Championship: John Pulman (ENG) (×2)

The 1964–65 snooker season was the series of professional snooker tournaments played between July 1964 and June 1965. The following table outlines the results for the season's events.

== Calendar ==
Date (Note: Dates use the mm-dd date format.)			Rank	Tournament name	Venue	City	Winner	Runner-up	Score	Ref.
10-12	10-17	ENG	NR	World Snooker Championship	Burroughes Hall	London	John Pulman (ENG)	Rex Williams (ENG)	40–33 (Note: Pulman achieved a winning margin at 37–23)	
03-15	03-21	ENG	NR	World Snooker Championship	Burroughes Hall	London	John Pulman (ENG)	Fred Davis (ENG)	37–36	
06-??	06-09	AUS	NR	Commonwealth Snooker Championship	Canterbury-Hurlstone RSL Club	Hurlstone Park	Eddie Charlton (AUS)	Warren Simpson (AUS)	369–208 (Note: aggregate points score across five frames)	
