= 1966 World Amateur Snooker Championship =

Tournament information
- City: Karachi
- Country: Pakistan
- Organisation: Billiards Association and Control Club
- Format: Round-robin
- Highest break: Gary Owen (WAL) 118

Final
- Champion: Gary Owen (WAL)
- Runner-up: John Spencer (ENG)

The 1966 World Amateur Snooker Championship was the second edition of the championship that later became known as the IBSF World Snooker Championship, following the first staging in 1963. It was played in Karachi, Pakistan as a round-robin. Five players participated. Gary Owen won all four of his matches and took the title, with John Spencer finishing in second place. Owen compiled the highest break of the event, 118. Barrie had set a new championship record break of 76 against Demarco. Owen surpassed it with a break of 106, also against Demarco, before making the 118 break in his match against Lafir.

== Final standings ==
Position	Player	Won	Lost	Frames	Highest break
1	Gary Owen (WAL)	5	0	30-7	118
2	John Spencer (ENG)	4	1	26–14	101
3	Bill Barrie (AUS)	3	2	23–22	73
4	Mohammed Lafir (LKA)	2	3	22–20	45
5	L.U. Demarco (SCO)	1	4	14–28	36
6	Hamid Karim (PAK)	0	5	6–30	60

=== Match results ===
Player	Score	Player	Ref.
Gary Owen (WAL)	6–0	Hamid Karim (PAK)	
Bill Barrie (AUS)	6–3	L.U. Demarco (SCO)	
John Spencer (ENG)	6–0	Hamid Karim (PAK)	
Gary Owen (WAL)	6–2	Mohammed Lafir (LKA)	
Mohammed Lafir (LKA)	6–2	L.U. Demarco (SCO)	
John Spencer (ENG)	6–5	Bill Barrie (AUS)	
Gary Owen (WAL)	6–3	L.U. Demarco (SCO)	
Mohammed Lafir (LKA)	6–0	Hamid Karim (PAK)	
Bill Barrie (AUS)	6–5	Mohammed Lafir (LKA)	
L.U. Demarco (SCO)	6–4	Hamid Karim (PAK)	
John Spencer (ENG)	6–0	L.U. Demarco (SCO)	
Bill Barrie (AUS)	6–2	Hamid Karim (PAK)	
Gary Owen (WAL)	6–2	John Spencer (ENG)	
John Spencer (ENG)	6–3	Mohammed Lafir (LKA)	
Gary Owen (WAL)	6–0	Bill Barrie (AUS)	
