= 1972 Australian Professional Championship =

Australian Professional Championship
Tournament information
- Dates: September–November 1972
- Country: Australia
- Format: Non-ranking event
- Highest break: Alan McDonald, 137

Final
- Champion: Eddie Charlton
- Runner-up: Gary Owen
- Score: 19–10

The 1972 Australian Professional Championship was a professional non-ranking snooker tournament, which took place from September to November 1972. The final was held at the Pacific Hotel, Southport, Queensland. Eddie Charlton was the defending champion, having defeated Warren Simpson 15–7 in the 1971 final.

Charlton retained his title, defeating Gary Owen 19–10 in the final, having achieved a decisive lead at 15–8. the highest break of the final was 87 by Charlton.

Players were divided into two qualifying groups, and four players progressed to the semi-finals. Alan McDonald's break of 137 against Rex King was the highest in the history of the Championship.

== Results ==
=== Round-robin ===
Qualifying group 1
Player	Score	Player	Ref.
Warren Simpson	11–5	Ian Anderson	
Warren Simpson	14–9	Rex King	
Warren Simpson	11–10	Alan McDonald	
Paddy Morgan	11–4	Warren Simpson	
Paddy Morgan	9–11	Alan McDonald	
Paddy Morgan	11–5	Ian Anderson	
Paddy Morgan	11–6	Rex King	
Alan McDonald	?-?	Rex King	
Alan McDonald	11–2	Ian Anderson	

Qualifying group 2
Player	Score	Player	Ref.
Norman Squire	11–7	Newton Gahan	
Eddie Charlton	17–4	Norman Squire	
Eddie Charlton	17–4	Newton Gahan	
Eddie Charlton	12–9	Gary Owen	
Gary Owen	9–6	Norman Squire	
Gary Owen	8–2	Newton Gahan	

=== Play-offs ===
Player	Score	Player	Ref.
Paddy Morgan	4–3	Alan McDonald	
Paddy Morgan	4–3	Warren Simpson	
Warren Simpson	4–3	Alan McDonald	

=== Semi-finals and final ===
Semi-finals; 25 frames		Final; 29 frames
Eddie Charlton	16
Warren Simpson	5	Eddie Charlton	19
Gary Owen	11	Gary Owen	10
Paddy Morgan	10
