= 1966 Australian Professional Championship =

Professional snooker tournament

Australian Professional Championship
Tournament information
- Dates: 8–16 August 1966
- Venue: The Harbord Diggers Memorial Club
- City: Harbord
- Country: Australia
- Format: Non-ranking event

Final
- Champion: Eddie Charlton
- Runner-up: Warren Simpson
- Score: 7–4

The 1966 Australian Professional Championship was a professional non-ranking snooker tournament, which took place from 8 to 16 August 1966. There were three participants: defending champion Norman Squire, Eddie Charlton, and Warren Simpson.

Charlton won the tournament with a 7–4 victory over Simpson in the final, 7–4, after both Charlton and Simpson had defeated Squire in the round matches.

The tournament was sponsored by The Harbord Diggers Memorial Club, and held at that venue. Horace Lindrum was master of ceremonies for the event, and provided the trophy, known as "The Horace Lindrum Permanent Trophy," which was presented to Charlton by A. J. Chown, president of the Amateur Billiard Association of New South Wales, the competition organisers.

Stage	Date	Player	Score	Player	Ref.
Round	8 August	Warren Simpson	3–2	Norman Squire	
Round	9 August	Eddie Charlton	3–2	Norman Squire	
Final	16 August	Eddie Charlton	7–4	Warren Simpson	
