= Class of '92 (snooker) =

Group of snooker players: Ronnie O'Sullivan, John Higgins, and Mark Williams

Class of '92

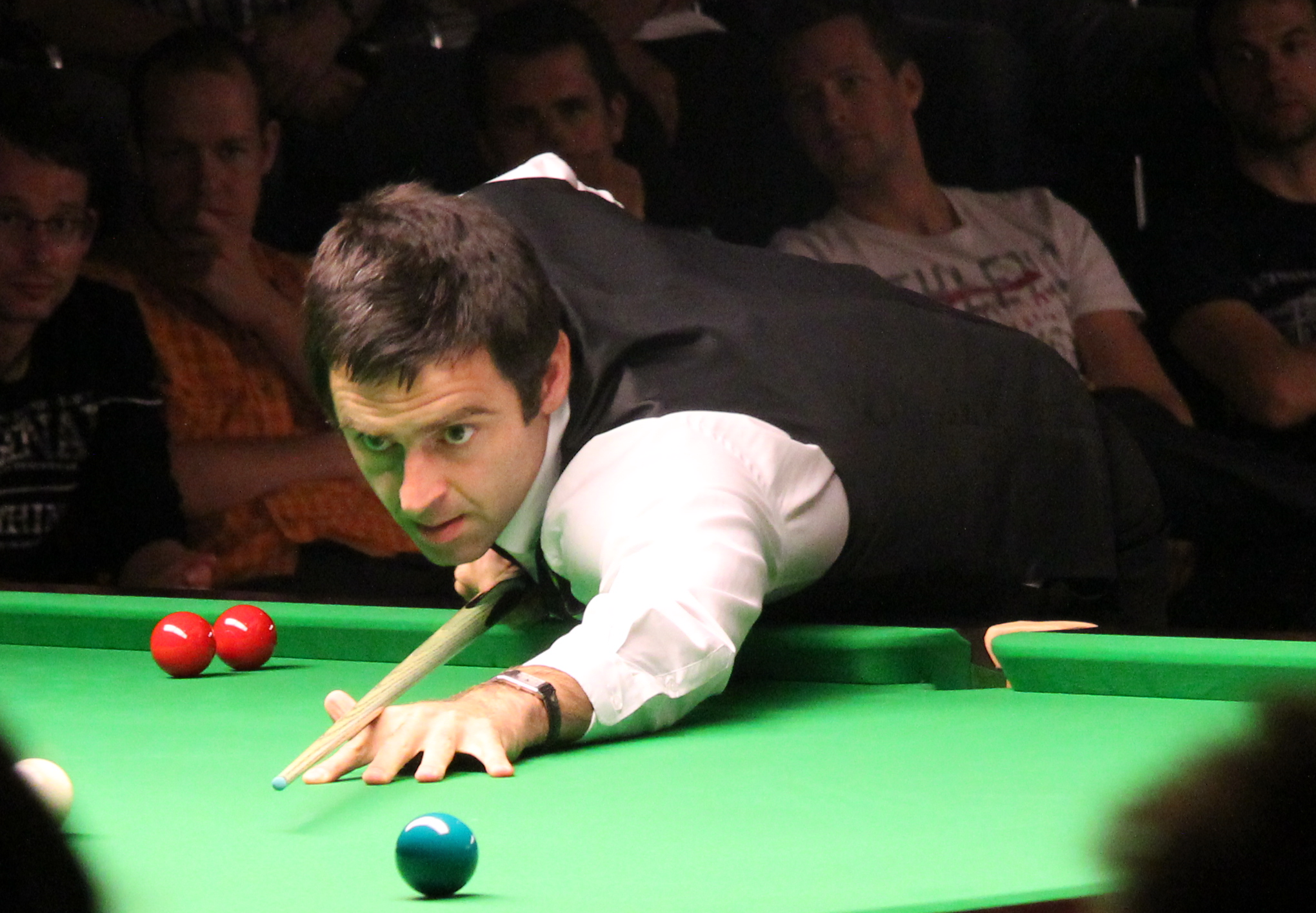
Ronnie O'Sullivan
(pictured in 2011)

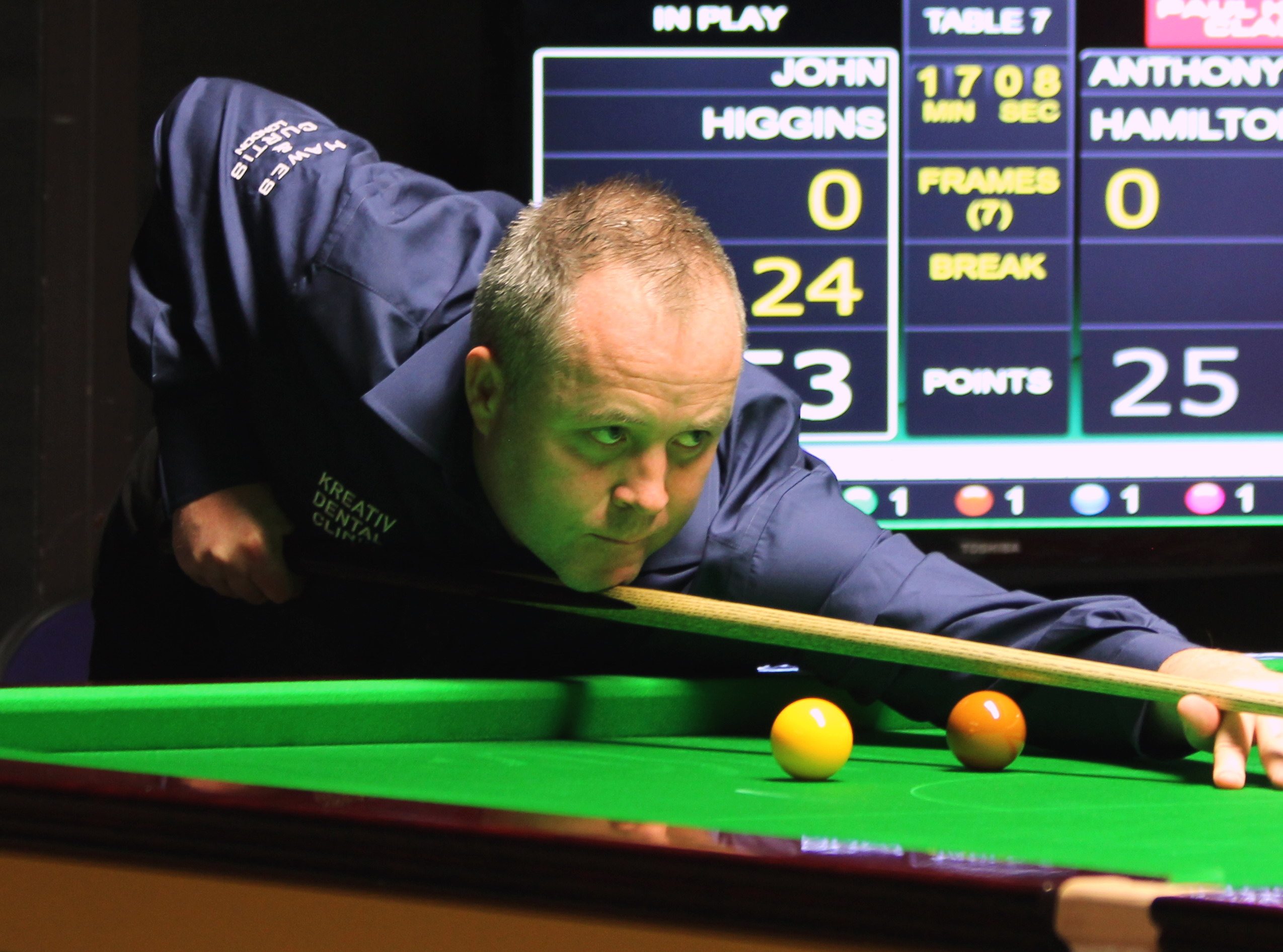
John Higgins
(pictured in 2015)

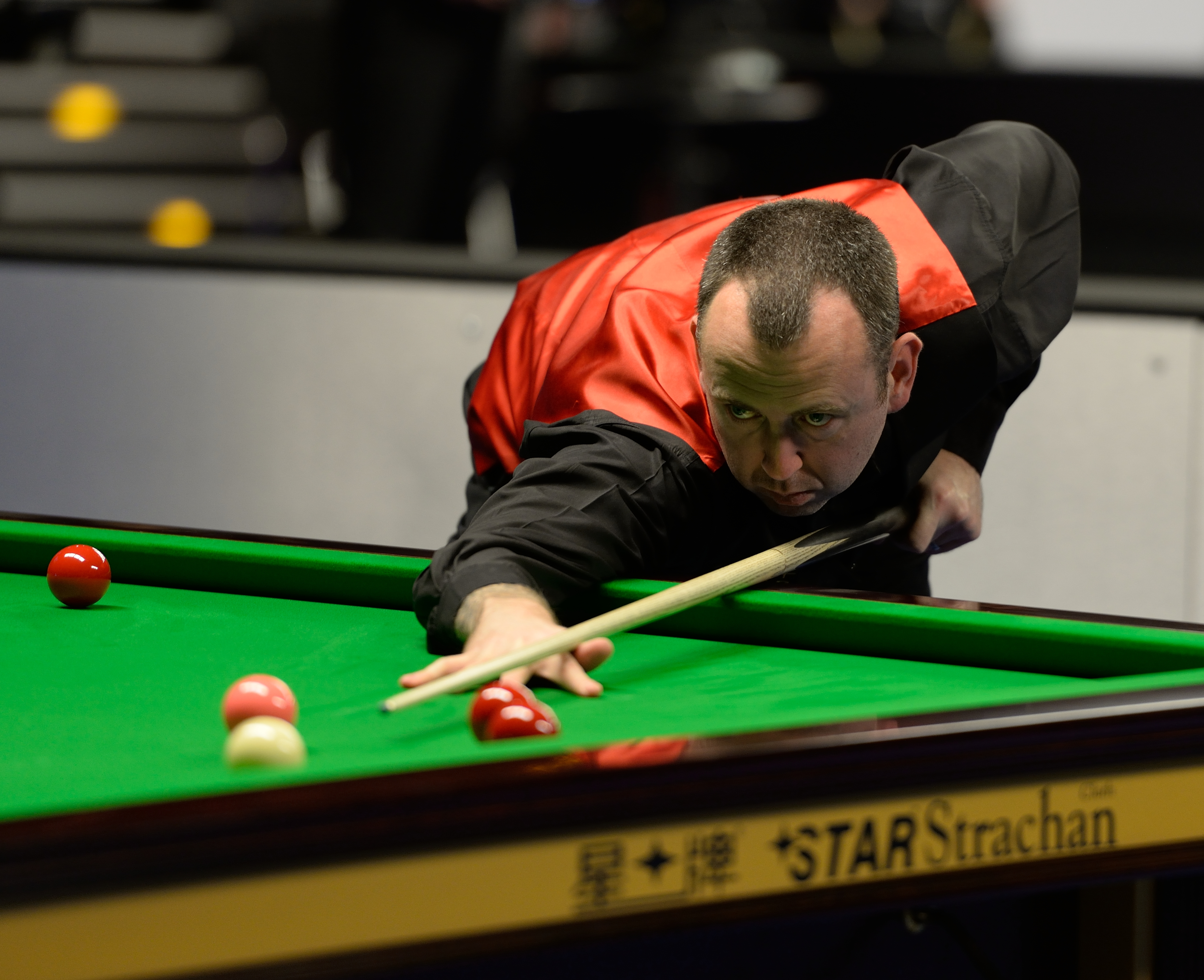
Mark Williams
(pictured in 2015)

The Class of '92 is a group of three professional snooker players: Ronnie O'Sullivan from England, John Higgins from Scotland, and Mark Williams from Wales. All three were born in 1975, Williams on 21 March, Higgins on 18 May, and O'Sullivan on 5 December. They all turned professional during the 1992–93 snooker season and have become known for their collective dominance of the sport—which includes a combined 101 ranking titles, 39 Triple Crown titles, 14 world titles, over 3,100 century breaks, and 33 maximum breaks—as well as their longevity as top-ranked players. As of September 2026, all three players remain ranked within the top 16 in the world. O'Sullivan has compared the Class of '92 to the Big Three of Novak Djokovic, Roger Federer, and Rafael Nadal in men's singles tennis.

== Achievements ==
The Class of '92 has collectively won 101 ranking titles, of which O'Sullivan has won 41, Higgins 33, and Williams 27. All three players have won each Triple Crown event multiple times, for a combined total of 39 Triple Crown titles. They have won a combined 14 world titles, three by Williams, in 2000, 2003, and 2018; four by Higgins, in 1998, 2007, 2009, and 2011; and a record-equalling seven by O'Sullivan, in 2001, 2004, 2008, 2012, 2013, 2020, and 2022. As of the 2026 World Championship, they have made a combined total of 94 appearances at the event's main stage at the Crucible, with O'Sullivan having featured 34 times, Higgins 32 times, and Williams 28 times. All three players reached the World Championship semi-finals in the same year on three occasions: in 1998 (with Ken Doherty), in 1999 (with Stephen Hendry), and in 2022 (with Judd Trump); additionally, all three reached the World Championship quarter-finals in the same year on two more occasions, in 2011 and 2025. At least one member of the Class of '92 featured in 19 of the 28 World Snooker Championship finals contested between 1998 and 2025.

As of September 2026, the Class of '92 has collectively compiled over 3,100 century breaks in professional competition. (Note: O'Sullivan current total = 1,339 Higgins current total = 1,073 Williams current total = 710 Collective current total = 3,122 (as of 4 November 2026)) O'Sullivan passed the 1,300 threshold on 16 August 2025, Higgins passed the 1,000 threshold on 19 September 2024, and Williams passed the 700 threshold on 11 September 2026. These include 33 officially recognised maximum breaks, of which O'Sullivan has made 17, Higgins 13, and Williams 3. From the time Higgins first became world number one in May 1998 until the end of the 2023–24 snooker season, the Class of '92 players held the top ranking spot for a cumulative 5,334 out of a total 9,499 days.

== Longevity ==
The Class of '92 players are known for their longevity in the sport. At the end of the 2021–22 snooker season, marking the end of 30 seasons on the professional tour, all three players were ranked within the top eight in the world. At the end of the 2024–25 season, in the same year the members of the Class of '92 all turned 50, all three were ranked in the top five.

As of May 2025, O'Sullivan is the oldest winner of all three Triple Crown events, having won his seventh world title in 2022, aged 46 years and 148 days; his eighth UK Championship title in 2023, aged 47 years and 363 days; and his eighth Masters title in 2024, aged 48 years and 40 days. He is the oldest player to have made a maximum break in professional competition, having made his 16th and 17th maximums in his semi-final match at the 2025 Saudi Arabia Snooker Masters, aged 49 years and 253 days. He subsequently made the highest break in professional snooker history, a 16-red clearance of 153, in his quarter-final match against Ryan Day at the 2026 World Open. It was only the second time that a break exceeding 147 had been made in professional competition, following the 148 by Jamie Burnett in the qualifying rounds of the 2004 UK Championship. O'Sullivan holds the record for the most appearances in the final stages of the World Championship at the Crucible, with 34 as of the 2026 event. At the 2024 Tour Championship, he and Williams set a record for the highest combined age (97) in any ranking snooker final.

At the 2025 World Snooker Championship, Williams became the oldest player to contest a World Championship final. Aged 50 years and 44 days, he broke the record previously held by Ray Reardon, who had been 49 years and 219 days old when he competed in the final of the 1982 event. At the 2025 Xi'an Grand Prix, at the age of 50 years and 206 days, Williams surpassed Reardon as the oldest player to win any ranking tournament. Reardon had been 50 years and 14 days old when he won the 1982 Professional Players Tournament.

Higgins holds the record for the longest uninterrupted tenure in the top 16 of the world rankings. He first entered the top 16 in the 1995–96 snooker world rankings and remained a top-16 player continuously until the conclusion of the 2024 English Open, a period spanning 10,738 days, or over 29 years. He also holds the record for the longest interval between a player's first and most recent ranking title, having won the 2025 Tour Championship 30 years and 165 days after his maiden ranking title at the 1994 Grand Prix. At the 2026 Masters, aged 50 years and 245 days, he became the oldest Triple Crown finalist, surpassing Ray Reardon, who had been 50 years and 114 days old when he played in the 1983 Masters final. At the 2026 Players Championship, at the age of 50 years and 280 days, Higgins became the second-oldest finalist at any ranking tournament, surpassed only by Rex Williams, who was aged 53 years and 98 days when he lost 6–10 to Jimmy White in the final of the 1986 Grand Prix. Higgins's 32 Crucible appearances put him in second place after O'Sullivan.

== Honours ==
All three players were honoured by Queen Elizabeth II for their services to snooker. Williams received an MBE in 2004, Higgins received an MBE in 2008, and O'Sullivan received an OBE in 2016. All three have been inducted into the World Snooker Tour Hall of Fame.

== Triple Crown and ranking events ==
The three players have won a total of 101 ranking events to date, O'Sullivan having won 41, Higgins 33, and Williams 27. They have also achieved 39 Triple Crown wins between them, O'Sullivan having won 23, Higgins 9, and Williams 7.

=== Triple Crown ===
Tournament	Ronnie O'Sullivan	John Higgins	Mark Williams	Total
World Championship	7	4	3	14
UK Championship	8	3	2	13
Masters	8	2	2	12
Total	23	9	7	39

=== Ranking events ===
Tournament	Ronnie O'Sullivan	John Higgins	Mark Williams	Total
World Championship	7	4	3	14
UK Championship	8	3	2	13
Welsh Open	4	5	2	11
World Open	1	5	4	10
British Open	1	4	3	8
German Masters	2	2	2	6
China Open	2	1	3	6
Scottish Open	2	2	0	4
World Grand Prix	3	0	0	3
Shanghai Masters	2	1	0	3
Players Championship	2	1	0	3
European Masters	1	1	1	3
Tour Championship	1	1	1	3
Thailand Masters	0	0	3	3
Irish Masters	2	0	0	2
Northern Ireland Trophy	1	0	0	1
Dubai Classic	1	0	0	1
English Open	1	0	0	1
International Championship	0	1	0	1
Indian Open	0	1	0	1
Australian Goldfields Open	0	1	0	1
Northern Ireland Open	0	0	1	1
WST Pro Series	0	0	1	1
Xi'an Grand Prix	0	0	1	1
Total	41	33	27	101

== Time as world number one ==
Player	From	To	Days	Total
Ray Reardon, Cliff Thorburn, Steve Davis, and Stephen Hendry.
John Higgins	5 May 1998	1 May 2000	728	7 years, 11 months, and 27 days
Mark Williams	2 May 2000	6 May 2002	735	7 years, 11 months, and 27 days
Ronnie O'Sullivan	7 May 2002	5 May 2003	364	7 years, 11 months, and 27 days
Mark Williams	6 May 2003	3 May 2004	364	7 years, 11 months, and 27 days
Ronnie O'Sullivan	4 May 2004	1 May 2006	728	7 years, 11 months, and 27 days
Stephen Hendry.
John Higgins	8 May 2007	5 May 2008	364	3 years, 4 months, and 19 days
Ronnie O'Sullivan	6 May 2008	3 May 2010	728	3 years, 4 months, and 19 days
John Higgins	4 May 2010	26 September 2010	146	3 years, 4 months, and 19 days
Neil Robertson.
John Higgins	13 December 2010	2 May 2011	141	8 months and 30 days
Mark Williams	3 May 2011	11 September 2011	132	8 months and 30 days
Mark Selby, Judd Trump, Neil Robertson, and Ding Junhui.
Ronnie O'Sullivan	25 March 2019	11 August 2019	140	4 months and 18 days
Judd Trump and Mark Selby.
Ronnie O'Sullivan	4 April 2022	6 May 2024 (Note: The end of the 2023–24 season.)	764	2 years, 1 month, and 3 days
Mark Allen, Judd Trump, and Zhao Xintong.
Total: 5,334 of a possible 9,499 days. (56.2% over 26 years)
Source: World Professional Billiards and Snooker Association.

== See also ==
- List of snooker players by number of ranking titles
- List of world number one snooker players
