= 1976–77 snooker world rankings =

World rankings for the 1976–77 snooker season

The World Professional Billiards and Snooker Association, the governing body for professional snooker, first published official world rankings for players on the main tour for the 1976–77 season. Before this, the defending champion was seeded first, and the previous year's runner-up second, for each tournament.

For the 1976–77 snooker season, players' performances in the previous three World Snooker Championships (1974, 1975, and 1976) contributed to their ranking points total. For each of the three years, the World Champion was awarded five points, the runner-up received four, losing semi-finalists got three, players eliminated in the quarter-finals gained two, and losers in the last-16 round received a single point. If players were level on points, then those gained in the most recent event determined positioning. If this was still equal, then the losing margin on frames was taken into account.

Ray Reardon, having won the championship in each of the three years considered, was ranked first, with the maximum possible 15 points, followed by Alex Higgins, the 1976 runner-up, on nine points. The eight-highest ranked players were placed directly into the last-16 round of the 1977 World Snooker Championship, whilst all other entrants were placed in a qualifying competition to produce the eight players to play the exempted seeds.

The same points system, based on results from 1973, 1974 and 1975, had been used to calculate the eight top seeds for the 1976 World Championship. Reardon had topped that list with 15 points, followed by Eddie Charlton on nine, and Higgins with eight.

== Rankings ==
No. 1: Ray Reardon
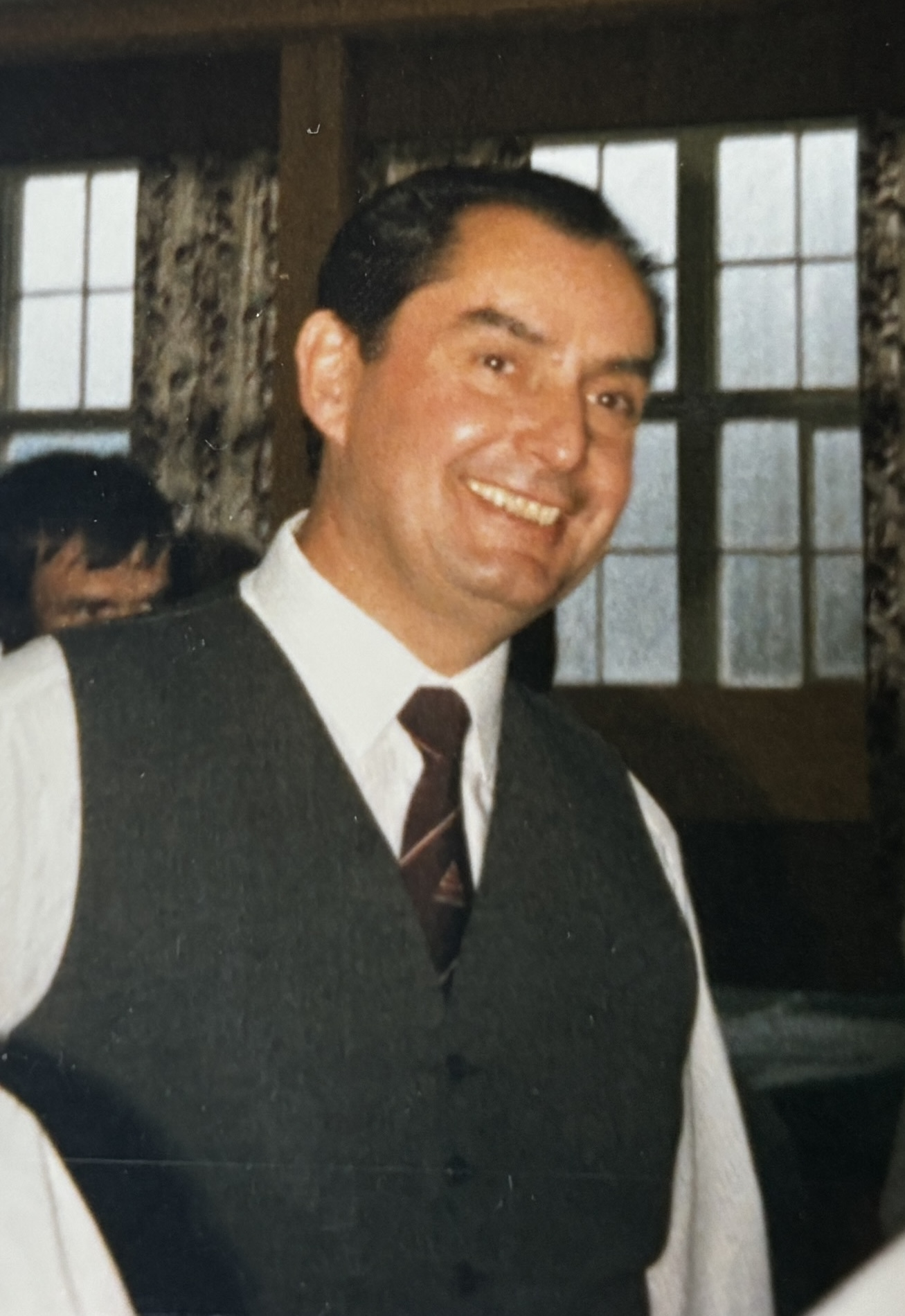
- Ray Reardon, circa 1983

Personal information
- Born: 8 October 1932
- Died: 20 July 2024 (aged 91)

Sport
- Country: Wales
- Sport: Snooker
- Professional: 1967–1991
- Highest ranking: 1

No. 2: Alex Higgins
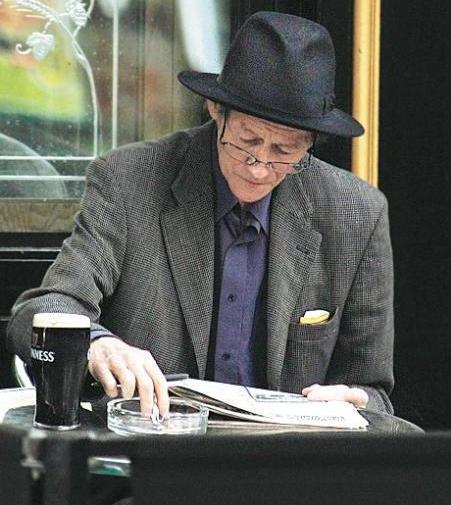
- Alex Higgins in 2008

Personal information
- Born: 18 March 1949
- Died: 24 July 2010 (aged 61)

Sport
- Country: Northern Ireland
- Sport: Snooker
- Professional: 1971–1997
- Highest ranking: 2

No. 3: Eddie Charlton
Personal information
- Born: 31 October 1929
- Died: 8 November 2004 (aged 75)

Sport
- Country: Australia
- Sport: Snooker
- Professional: 1963–1995
- Highest ranking: 3

The professional world rankings for the snooker players on the main tour in the 1976–77 season are listed below. Points gained in each of the three World Snooker Championships are shown, with the total number of points given in the last column. A "–" symbol indicates that the player did not participate in that year's championship.

Snooker world rankings 1976/1977
| Ranking | Name | Country | 1974 | 1975 | 1976 | Total Points |
|---|---|---|---|---|---|---|
| 1 | Ray Reardon | Wales | 5 | 5 | 5 | 15 |
| 2 | Alex Higgins | Northern Ireland | 2 | 3 | 4 | 9 |
| 3 | Eddie Charlton | Australia | 1 | 4 | 3 | 8 |
| 4 | Fred Davis | England | 3 | 1 | 2 | 6 |
| 5 | Graham Miles | England | 4 | 1 | 1 | 6 |
| 6 | Rex Williams | England | 3 | 2 | 1 | 6 |
| 7 | Perrie Mans | South Africa | 2 | 0 | 3 | 5 |
| 8 | John Spencer | England | 1 | 2 | 2 | 5 |
| 9 | Dennis Taylor | Northern Ireland | 0 | 3 | 2 | 5 |
| 10 | Gary Owen | Wales | 1 | 2 | 1 | 4 |
| 11 | John Dunning | England | 2 | 1 | 1 | 4 |
| 12 | Jim Meadowcroft | England | 1 | 0 | 2 | 3 |
| 13 | Cliff Thorburn | Canada | 0 | 2 | 1 | 3 |
| 14 | Bill Werbeniuk | Canada | 1 | 1 | 1 | 3 |
| 15 | John Pulman | England | 1 | 1 | 1 | 3 |
| 16 | David Taylor | England | 0 | 1 | 1 | 2 |
| 17 | Marcus Owen | Wales | 2 | – | 0 | 2 |
| 18 | Bernard Bennett | England | 1 | 0 | 0 | 1 |
| 19 | Ian Anderson | Australia | 0 | 1 | 0 | 1 |
| 20 | Warren Simpson | Australia | 0 | 1 | – | 1 |
| 21 | Paddy Morgan | Australia | 1 | 0 | – | 1 |

| Preceded by — | 1976/1977 | Succeeded by 1977/1978 |
