= Muhammad Lafir =

Sri Lankan snooker player

Muhammad Junaid Muhammad Lafir
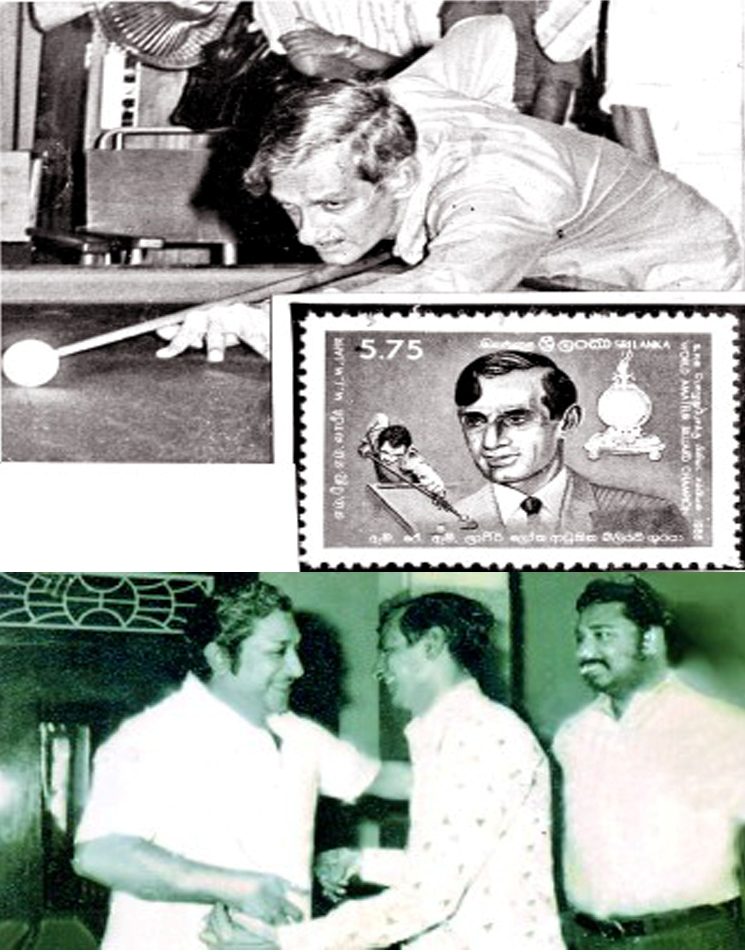
- Muhammad Lafir with Indian actor Shivaji Ganesan

Personal information
- Born: 27 May 1930 Grandpass, Colombo, Sri Lanka, Western Province
- Died: 17 April 1981 (aged 50) Colombo, Sri Lanka

Sport
- Country: Sri Lanka
- Sport: Snooker

Tournament wins
- World Championship: 1973

Muhammad Junaid Muhammad Lafir (27 May 1930 - 17 April 1981 ) also known as either Mohammed Lafir or M J M Lafir was a Sri Lankan snooker player. He won the IBSF Amateur World Championship in 1973 and is regarded as the greatest snooker player of Sri Lanka.

== Biography ==
Muhammad Lafir was born on 27 May 1930 in Grandpass, a suburb of Colombo, at St. Joseph's Street. He had two brothers and a sister in his family. He studied at Hameediah Boys English School (now known as Hameed Al Husseinie College). He died on 26 April 1981 at his own house.

== Career ==
Lafir learnt the game of billiards and pursued his interest in the sport at the age of seven through his father S. L. M. Junaid. His father was a domestic snooker player who has played in friendly domestic tournaments and it inspired Lafir to take up the sport. He initially learnt to play billiards on his family dining table very often with his father using a broomstick as a cue and marbles as cue balls.

He joined the Moors Islamic Cultural Home in 1947 and played friendly tournaments representing it. Lafir also took part in Sri Lankan National Billiards Championships and won his first national snooker championship in 1948. He then reigned the Sri Lanka National Snooker Championship from 1952 to 1973, winning 16 successive tournaments. He also then participated in the Indian Snooker Championship and won it on seven occasions (1956, 1957, 1959, 1961, 1963, 1974–75 and 1976). He managed to defeat Indian national champion Chandra Hirjee in the 1956 and 1957 Indian Snooker Championship finals. A renowned businessman U. W. Sumathipala came forward to assist Lafir in terms of financial needs after watching him scoring 500 break points in a domestic friendly game. Sumathipala assisted him to take part in overseas International competitions and Lafir also took part in friendly tours organised and sponsored by U. W. Sumathipala's son Jagath Sumathipala. Former Sri Lankan Prime Minister S. W. R. D. Bandaranaike also supported Lafir and gave financial assistance in order to take part in international competitions.

Lafir also competed at Amateur World Championships and he finished 3rd on his debut World Championships in 1963 which was held in Calcutta. He finished at fourth position in the 1966 World Amateur Snooker Championship. He also emerged as runners-up to England's Leslie Driffield at the 1967 IBSF World Billiards Championship. He again finished at third position at the 1968 World Amateur Snooker Championship and finished fourth place in the 1971 World Amateur Championship.

Lafir became the world champion in billiards in December 1973 World Amateur Billiards Championship by defeating Satish Mohan of India in the finals held in Mumbai. He had an outstanding unbeaten run in the 1973 tournament winning all nine matches and remained unbeaten in the tournament. He defeated Clive Everton, Michael Ferreira, Lu Demarco, Alfred Nolan, Eric Simmons, Brian Kirkness, Phil Tarrant and Paul Mifsud in the round robin and preliminary rounds to reach his second IBSF finals and went onto defeat Sathish Mohan in the final. During the tournament, in a match against New Zealand's Eric Simmons he created a world record for highest break in a single set with 859 points. It also remained as the only world championship title won by him. Lafir became the first Sri Lankan to win a billiards world championship and still remains as the only Sri Lankan to have won a billiards world championship title. This was also the first time that a Sri Lankan has won a world championship title in any form of sports competition. However he wasn't able to defend his world title in the next World Championships in 1974 eventually being knocked out in the quarterfinals. He later served as an employee for Sri Lanka Transport Board after retiring from professional billiards.

== Honours ==
Lafir was acknowledged by the ministers of the then government following his triumph at the 1973 World Championships. He was given a special red carpet welcome gesture on 22 December 1973 at the Katunayake International Airport following his return to Sri Lanka after taking part in the competition. On 31 December 1973, he was accorded with civic reception by the mayor of Colombo Municipal Council, Vincent Perera. Government of Sri Lanka honoured his achievements by issuing a national stamp with his face appearing on the front side.

After his death, on his 53rd birthday anniversary Messenger Street which is one of the prominent places in Sri Lanka was renamed as MJM Lafir Mawatha. MJM Lafir Asian Snooker was also introduced after him in 1988 in memory and remembrance of him.

== See also ==
- List of Sri Lankans by sport
