= 1965 Commonwealth Snooker Championship =

Tournament information
- Dates: June 1965
- Venue: Canterbury-Hurlstone RSL Club
- City: Hurlstone Park, New South Wales
- Country: Australia
- Format: Non-ranking event

Final
- Champion: Eddie Charlton (AUS)
- Runner-up: Warren Simpson (AUS)
- Score: 369–208

The 1965 Commonwealth Snooker Championship was a professional non-ranking snooker tournament, which took place in June 1965 at the Canterbury-Hurlstone RSL Club, Hurlstone Park, New South Wales. The final, held on 9 June, was decided on an aggregate points score across five frames. Eddie Charlton won the tournament by defeating Warren Simpson 369–208 in the final.

Simpson compiled a new Australian record break of 137 against Frank Harris in a preliminary round match.

== Results ==
Players in bold denote match winners.

**Semi-finals**; Best of 9 frames		**Final**; Aggregate score across 5 frames
Fred Davis (ENG)	3
**Eddie Charlton (AUS)**	**5**	**Eddie Charlton (AUS)**	**369**
**Warren Simpson (AUS)**	**5**	Warren Simpson (AUS)	208
Newton Gahan (AUS)	2
