= 1972–73 snooker season =

Details
- Duration: July 1972 – April 1973
- Tournaments: 7 (non-ranking)

Triple Crown winners
- World Championship: (Wales) Ray Reardon

The 1972–73 snooker season was a series of snooker tournaments played between July 1972 and April 1973. The following table outlines the results for the season's events.

== Calendar ==
Date (Note: Dates use the mm-dd date format.)			Rank	Tournament name	Venue	City	Winner	Runner-up	Score	Reference
09-08		ENG	NR	Stratford Professional	Wootton Wawen Social Club	Wootton Wawen	(Northern Ireland) Alex Higgins	(England) John Spencer	6–3	
09-30	10-29	ENG	NR	Park Drive 2000 (Autumn 1972)		Various	(England) John Spencer	(Northern Ireland) Alex Higgins	5–3	
09–19	11–23	AUS	NR	Australian Professional Championship		Sydney	(Australia) Eddie Charlton	(Wales) Gary Owen	19–10	
11–27	12–01	SCO	NR	Scottish Professional Tournament	Govan Town Hall	Glasgow	(England) John Spencer	(England) John Pulman	5–1	
12–11	12–13	ENG	NR	Ford Series Tournament	Stanley Institute	Burscough	(Northern Ireland) Alex Higgins	(England) John Pulman	4–2	
12–14	12–16	ENG	NR	Ryde Tournament	Ryde Esplanade Pavilion	Ryde	(Wales) Ray Reardon	(Northern Ireland) Alex Higgins	4–1	
12–29	01-01	ENG	NR	Pot Black	BBC Studios	Birmingham	(Australia) Eddie Charlton	(England) Rex Williams	1–0	
01–08	02–05	ENG	NR	Men Of The Midlands		Various	(Northern Ireland) Alex Higgins	(Wales) Ray Reardon	5–3	
04–16	04–28	ENG	NR	World Snooker Championship	City Exhibition Hall	Manchester	(Wales) Ray Reardon	(Australia) Eddie Charlton	38–22	
