= 1975 World Snooker Championship =

Snooker tournament

Tournament information
- Dates: 9 April – 1 May 1975
- Final venue: Nunawading Basketball Centre
- Final city: Melbourne
- Country: Australia
- Organisation: WPBSA
- Format: Ranking event
- Total prize fund: A$30,000
- Winner's share: A$7,500
- Highest break: Dennis Taylor (NIR) (128)

Final
- Champion: Ray Reardon (WAL)
- Runner-up: Eddie Charlton (AUS)
- Score: 31–30

The 1975 World Snooker Championship was a professional snooker tournament that took place between 9 April and 1 May 1975 at various venues in Australia. It was the 1975 edition of the World Snooker Championship, an event first held in 1927. The tournament featured 27 participants, eight of whom were seeded and received byes to the second round. It featured a prize fund of A$30,000, the winner receiving A$7,500. This is the second (and most recent) World Snooker Championship to have been held outside the United Kingdom since the competition reverted to a knockout format in 1969. The tournament was promoted by Eddie Charlton Promotions on behalf of the World Professional Billiards and Snooker Association.

The final was held at the Nunawading Basketball Centre in Melbourne. Defending champion Ray Reardon played Eddie Charlton in a best-of-61 frames match. Reardon won 10 of the 12 frames on the second day to lead 16–8, but Charlton took the first nine frames on day three and moved into the lead. Reardon then led 23–21 before Charlton won eight frames in a row to lead 29–23, requiring just two of the last nine frames to win. However, Reardon then took seven frames in a row and, although Charlton levelled the match at 30–30, Reardon won the deciding frame to secure a 31–30 victory. It was the third consecutive year that Reardon won the title, and his fourth overall. Dennis Taylor made the highest break of the tournament, 128, in his quarter-final match against Gary Owen.

== Overview and format ==
Venues in New South Wales and ACT
Other venues in Australia

The World Snooker Championship is the preeminent tournament in professional snooker. Joe Davis won the first edition, in 1927 at Camkin's Hall in Birmingham, England. Ray Reardon was the defending champion in 1975, having defeated Graham Miles 22–12 in the 1974 final.

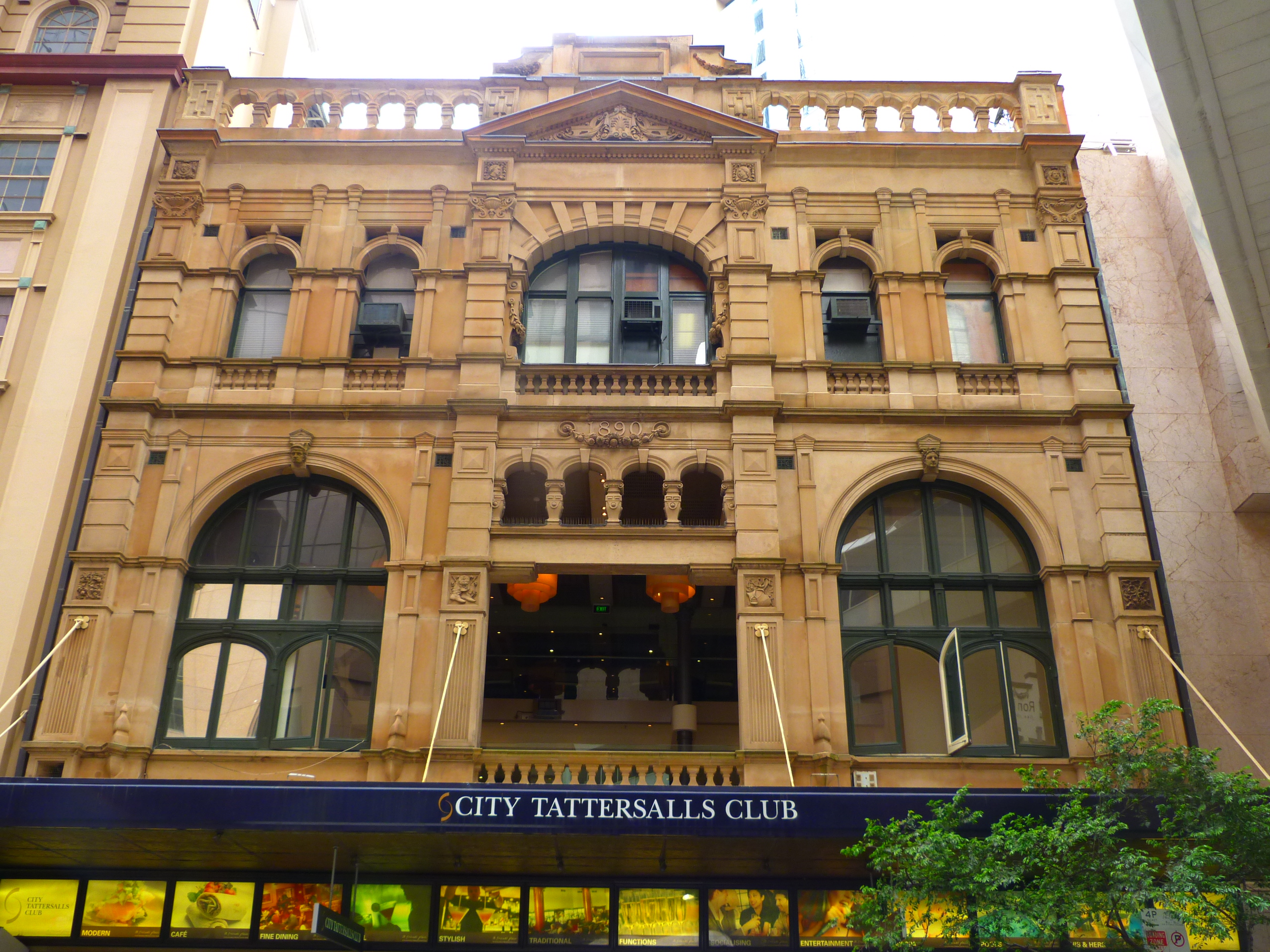
Two matches were played at City Tattersalls Club, Sydney

The championship was held from 9 April to 1 May 1975 at multiple locations across Australia. This was the second time since 1969 that the championship was held outside the United Kingdom, after 1971. (Note: Two challenge matches for the championship in 1965 were held in South Africa.) Tobacco brand Park Drive did not continue its sponsorship from 1974. The World Professional Billiards and Snooker Association appointed Eddie Charlton Promotions as the promoter. Eddie Charlton was a leading player, and had been the losing finalist in the 1973 World Snooker Championship. Snooker historian Clive Everton later wrote that "Some sports might have found it odd that a world championship should be promoted by one of its leading contenders but professional snooker, ever since the days of Joe Davis, was used to the idea of a player or clique of players having control of either promotion or administration, or both."

The event featured 27 participants, with a preliminary round, and eight seeded players who were awarded byes to the second round. The number of frames increased during the tournament, with the opening rounds being the best of 29, the quarter-finals and semi-finals best of 37 and the final a best of 61 frames match.

There was controversy about the seedings. John Spencer was seeded 8 which meant that he met top seed Reardon in the quarter-finals; the pair were regarded as the two leading players. 1972 champion Alex Higgins was also in the top half of the draw, while promoter Eddie Charlton was in the bottom half. Several years later, in his autobiography, Reardon called the seedings for the tournament "a farce". Journalist and author John Dee referred to "shady goings on perhaps by the draw committee who seemed to be doing their utmost to bring the title to Australia."

=== Prize fund ===
The breakdown of prize money for this year is shown below:

- Winner: A$7,500
- Runner-up: A$4,000
- Semi-final: A$3.000
- Quarter-final: A$1,500
- Last 16: A$750
- Total: A$30,000

== Tournament summary ==
Most of the early round matches were played in New South Wales although the semi-finals were played in Canberra and Brisbane, and the final in Melbourne. Reardon arrived in Australia on 3 March for to play a series of 23 exhibition matches against Charlton ahead of the tournament.

This was the only year in which Rex King, Ron Mares and Phil Tarrant ever participated in the main Championship. Jim Charlton and Lou Condo also made their world championship debuts.

=== Preliminary round ===
The three preliminary matches were the best of 29 frames, and each featured an Australian player against an English one. David Greaves won in the deciding frame against Jim Charlton. Lou Condo led Maurice Parkin 13–8 going into their final session; he won the first two frames of the concluding session to complete a 15–8 victory. Phil Tarrant needed to win only a single frame from their last session to defeat Bernard Bennett after building a 14–7 lead, and took the match 15–8.

=== First round ===
First-round matches were played across 29 frames. Warren Simpson, runner-up in 1970, defeated Ron Mares 19–10 after he had achieved a winning margin at 15–5. John Pulman eliminated Tarrant 23–6, having assured his win at 15–5. David Taylor defeated Rex King at 15–8. Ian Anderson – who, aged 28, was one of the youngest competitors – took a 6–1 lead against Condo, and won 15–8.

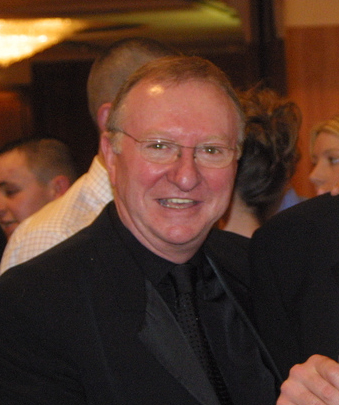
Dennis Taylor (pictured in 2004) made the highest break of the tournament, 128.

South African Professional Championship winner Perrie Mans was defeated by Dennis Taylor 15–12. Mans was down by two frames after the first session, but recovered to 7–7, before Taylor pulled ahead in the third session. The pair shared the two dead frames for a final score of 16–13. Gary Owen progressed to the next round after achieving a decisive margin against Greaves at 15–3. He won all but one of the dead frames, for 25–4. Jim Meadowcroft led Bill Werbeniuk 2–5, but Werbeniuk reached a winning score at 15–9. Cliff Thorburn took a 10–4 lead against Paddy Morgan, gained the win at 15–6, and finished the contest at 17–12.

=== Second round ===
In the second round, matches were contested over 29 frames. Ray Reardon took a 4–3 lead against Simpson in their first session and eventually won 15–11, after which Simpson won the three dead frames. John Spencer defeated Pulman 15–10; the four dead frames were shared for a final score of 17–12. Alex Higgins defeated David Taylor 15–2; Taylor narrowed his deficit during the dead frames to leave the final score 20–9 to Higgins. Rex Williams led Anderson 9–3, and won 15–4; each player took five of the dead frames, so it ended 20–9.

In a match that was played against a noisy background of numerous slot machines at the Marrickville RSL Club, Dennis Taylor won each of the first three sessions against Fred Davis by the odd frame, 4–3. Davis then took the first four frames of the final session to lead 13–12; two frames later he led 14–13, but Taylor won the next two frames to secure a 15–14 victory. Davis later wrote that the tournament "turned out to be a farce from my point of view ... the noise and distraction were incredible".

Owen defeated John Dunning 19–10, having secured his passage to the next round at 15–8. Eddie Charlton made the first century break of the championship, 125, during his 15–11 defeat of Werbeniuk. Werbeniuk added only one of the dead frames, ending at 12–17. Thorburn won six of the seven frames in the first session against Graham Miles, followed by him adding all seven frames from their second session. Miles won only four of the 29 frames they played; Thorburn won at 15–2.

=== Quarter-finals ===
The quarter-final matches were played across 37 frames. Spencer recorded breaks of 114 and 103, and had a two-frame lead after the first session of his match against Reardon. The pair each won three frames in the second session, to leave Spencer leading 7–5. During the fourth session, five breaks of over 50 were made and Reardon levelled the match at 12–12. Reardon won the match 19–18. Reardon commented after the match, "I think this was probably the greatest match ever played ... I've never potted better or defended better, and I don't think John has." The match between Higgins and Williams was delayed for 50 minutes during the second session after an overhead light fell onto the snooker table. Higgins later led 13–5. The final score was 21–16 to Higgins, who had won the match at 19–12.

Taylor gained a 13–5 lead against Owen and made the highest break of the tournament, 128, during his 19–9 win. The final score was 23–14 to Taylor. Charlton and Thorburn drew each of their first three sessions 3–3. Charlton established an advantage in the fourth session, and ended it 13–11 up. Thorburn later recalled that, shortly after the commencement of the fifth session, Charlton started to play more quickly: "He went for everything. He hardly missed a thing. He was running around the table, running around it!" Thorburn, writing in 1987, remarked that he had never faced anyone who played as well as Charlton had during that session. The final score was 23–14 to Charlton, with a conclusive score reached at 19–12.

=== Semi-finals ===
The semi-finals were the best of 37 frames. Reardon took the first two sessions against Higgins by margins of 5–1 and 4–2, but Higgins drew level at 10–10; Reardon went on to win 19–14.

Taylor flew in a light aircraft from Sydney on the morning of his match with Charlton; the aircraft encountered turbulence, and, according to Everton, Taylor "never recovered from a poor start". Charlton took 10 of the first 12 frames, and was 16–8 ahead after four sessions, going on to win 19–12. In his autobiography, Taylor recalled that "Charlton was playing well, with his famous gun-barrel cueing action", but also mentioned that he had been at a disadvantage playing on a table that Charlton was used to from his earlier matches in the tournament.

=== Final ===
The final was held at the Nunawading Basketball Centre on Burwood Highway, in Burwood East, Victoria, as the best of 61 frames. Reardon led 16–8, but Charlton then won the next nine frames to take the lead. Reardon was ahead 22–20, but Charlton won nine of the following ten frames to lead 29–23. Reardon produced a seven-frame winning streak to leave himself needing one further frame at 30–29. Charlton won the 60th frame. In the deciding frame, Reardon made a 62 break, to claim victory at 31–30. It was Reardon's third consecutive championship win, and his fourth overall. In all, he won six world titles. Charlton never again reached the final, but was runner-up at the World Billiards Championship in 1984 and 1988.

The 1975 tournament received significantly less UK press coverage than the three preceding world championships had done; the level of coverage in the Australian press was described as "very poor" by Snooker Scene magazine. Everton considered that for Charlton, losing the final was "a psychological set back from which [he] never recovered".

=== Schedule ===
Schedule of matches for the 1975 World Snooker Championship
Round	Match	Dates	Venue, city	Ref
Preliminary	David Greaves v Jim Charlton	9–10 April 1975	Woonona-Bulli RSL Memorial Hall, Wollongong, NSW	
Preliminary	Phil Tarrant v Bernard Bennett	10–11 April 1975	City Tattersalls Club, Sydney, NSW	
Preliminary	Lou Condo v Maurice Parkin	10–11 April 1975	Queanbeyan Leagues Club, NSW	
First round	John Pulman v Phil Tarrant	13–14 April 1975	Auburn Baseball Club, NSW	
First round	Warren Simpson v Ron Mares	14–15 April 1975	Central Coast Leagues Club, Gosford, NSW	
First round	David Taylor v Rex King	14–15 April 1975	Marrickville RSL Club, Sydney, NSW	
First round	Ian Anderson v Lou Condo	14–15 April 1975	Bentleigh Club, Melbourne, Victoria	
First round	Dennis Taylor v Perrie Mans	14–15 April 1975	City Tattersalls Club, Sydney, NSW	
First round	Gary Owen v David Greaves	14–15 April 1975	Goulburn Workers' Club, NSW	
First round	Bill Werbeniuk v Jim Meadowcroft	14–15 April 1975	Grafton District Services Club, NSW	
First round	Cliff Thorburn v Paddy Morgan	14–15 April 1975	Tamworth Workers' Club, NSW	
Second round	Ray Reardon v Warren Simpson	16–17 April 1975	Central Coast Leagues Club, Gosford, NSW	
Second round	Rex Williams v Ian Anderson	16–17 April 1975	Bentleigh Club, Melbourne, Victoria	
Second round	Cliff Thorburn v Graham Miles	16–17 April 1975	Queanbeyan Leagues Club, NSW	
Second round	John Spencer v John Pulman	17–18 April 1975	Dapto Leagues Club, Wollongong, NSW	
Second round	Alex Higgins v David Taylor	17–18 April 1975	Albury SS&A, NSW	
Second round	Dennis Taylor v Fred Davis	17–18 April 1975	Marrickville RSL Club, Sydney, NSW	
Second round	Gary Owen v John Dunning	17–18 April 1975	Broken Hill RSL Club, NSW	
Second round	Eddie Charlton v Bill Werbeniuk	17–18 April 1975	Grafton District Services Club, NSW	
Quarter-finals	Ray Reardon v John Spencer	21–23 April 1975	Cooma RSL Club, NSW	
Quarter-finals	Alex Higgins v Rex Williams	21–23 April 1975	Wentworthville Leagues Club, Sydney, NSW	
Quarter-finals	Dennis Taylor v Gary Owen	21–23 April 1975	Harbord Diggers' Club, Sydney, NSW	
Quarter-finals	Eddie Charlton v Cliff Thorburn	21–23 April 1975	Sherwood Services Club, Brisbane, Queensland	
Semi-finals	Ray Reardon v Alex Higgins	24–26 April 1975	Canberra Workers' Club, ACT	
Semi-finals	Eddie Charlton v Dennis Taylor	24–26 April 1975	Past Brothers Club, Brisbane, Queensland	
Final	Ray Reardon v Eddie Charlton	27 April–1 May 1975	Nunawading Basketball Centre, Melbourne, Victoria	

== Results ==
=== Preliminary matches ===
Results of the preliminary matches were as follows. Scores shown do not include dead frames.

Preliminary matches. Best of 29 frames.
Player	Score	Player
**Phil Tarrant (AUS)**	**15**–8	Bernard Bennett (ENG)
**Lou Condo (AUS)**	**15**–8	Maurice Parkin (ENG)
**David Greaves (ENG)**	**15**–14	Jim Charlton (AUS)

=== Main draw ===
Below is the results from the event. Players in bold denote match winners, whilst numbers in brackets are the players seeding. Scores shown do not include dead frames.

**Round 1** Best of 29 frames
**Warren Simpson (AUS)**	**15**
Ron Mares (AUS)	5
**John Pulman (ENG)**	**15**
Phil Tarrant (AUS)	5
**David Taylor (ENG)**	**15**
Rex King (AUS)	8
**Ian Anderson (AUS)**	**15**
Lou Condo (AUS)	8
**Dennis Taylor (NIR)**	**15**
Perrie Mans (SAF)	12
**Gary Owen (WAL)**	**15**
David Greaves (ENG)	3
**Bill Werbeniuk (CAN)**	**15**
Jim Meadowcroft (ENG)	9
**Cliff Thorburn (CAN)**	**15**
Paddy Morgan (AUS)	6

**Round 2** Best of 29 frames
**Ray Reardon (WAL) (1)**	**15**
Warren Simpson (AUS)	11
**John Spencer (ENG) (8)**	**15**
John Pulman (ENG)	10
**Alex Higgins (NIR) (5)**	**15**
David Taylor (ENG)	2
**Rex Williams (ENG) (4)**	**15**
Ian Anderson (AUS)	4
Fred Davis (ENG) (3)	14
**Dennis Taylor (NIR)**	**15**
John Dunning (ENG) (6)	8
**Gary Owen (WAL)**	**15**
**Eddie Charlton (AUS) (7)**	**15**
Bill Werbeniuk (CAN)	11
Graham Miles (ENG) (2)	2
**Cliff Thorburn (CAN)**	**15**

**Quarter-finals**; Best of 37 frames
(Wales) **Ray Reardon (1)**	**19**
(England) John Spencer (8)	17
(Northern Ireland) **Alex Higgins (5)**	**19**
(England) Rex Williams (4)	12
(Northern Ireland) **Dennis Taylor**	**19**
(Wales) Gary Owen	9
(Australia) **Eddie Charlton (7)**	**19**
(Canada) Cliff Thorburn	12

**Semi-finals**; Best of 37 frames
(Wales) **Ray Reardon (1)**	**19**
(Northern Ireland) Alex Higgins (5)	14
(Northern Ireland) Dennis Taylor	12
(Australia) **Eddie Charlton (7)**	**19**

**Final**; Best of 61 frames
(Wales) **Ray Reardon (1)**	**31**
(Australia) Eddie Charlton (7)	30

== Century breaks ==
The following century breaks were made during the tournament:

- 128 – Dennis Taylor
- 124, 109 – Eddie Charlton
- 114, 103 – John Spencer
- 104 – Ray Reardon
