= 1976 Australian Professional Championship =

Australian Professional Championship
Tournament information
- Dates: September 1976
- Venue: Dandanong Football Club
- City: Melbourne
- Country: Australia
- Organisation: WPBSA
- Format: Non-ranking event

Final
- Champion: Eddie Charlton
- Runner-up: Paddy Morgan

The 1976 Australian Professional Championship was a professional non-ranking snooker tournament, which took place in September 1976.

Eddie Charlton won the tournament after the other finalist Paddy Morgan withdrew from the tournament in protest of Charlton being allowed to use his own personal set of snooker balls alongside his own choice of table.

== Main draw ==
Quarter-finals; Best of 29 frames
Eddie Charlton	15
Lou Condo	3
Gary Owen	15
Ian Anderson	11
Paddy Morgan	15
Ron Mares	12
Warren Simpson	15
Dennis Wheelwright	13

Semi-finals; Best of 37 frames
Eddie Charlton	19
Gary Owen	6
Paddy Morgan	19
Warren Simpson	11

Final
Eddie Charlton	w/o
Paddy Morgan	w/d
