= 1968 Willie Smith Trophy =

Tournament information
- Dates: 9–13 January 1968
- Venue: Queen's Hall
- City: Leeds
- Country: England
- Format: Non-ranking event
- Highest break: Gary Owen (WAL), 80

Final
- Champion: Gary Owen (WAL)
- Runner-up: John Dunning (ENG)

The 1968 Willie Smith Trophy was a Round-robin invitational snooker tournament held at the Queen's Hall, Leeds, from 9 to 13 January 1968. It featured three professional players, Gary Owen, John Spencer and Jackie Rea, and amateur player John Dunning. Owen won all three of his matches and was the champion, in his first tournament as a professional player.

The tournament was organised by Jim Williamson, and was commercially successful, attracting capacity audiences for several of the sessions played. Dunning received 14 points start in each frame from the professionals. Seven frames were played in each match, with frame averages to be used as the deciding factor if players were tied on the number of matches won. The highest break was 80, compiled by Owen against Dunning in the final frame of the match that confirmed him as the champion.

== Match results ==
Players in bold denote match winners.

Player	Score	Player
Gary Owen (WAL)	**4**–3	John Spencer (ENG)
John Dunning (ENG)	**5**–2	Jackie Rea (NIR)
John Dunning (ENG)	**5**–2	John Spencer (ENG)
Gary Owen (WAL)	**6**–1	Jackie Rea (NIR)
Gary Owen (WAL)	**5**–2	John Dunning (ENG)
Jackie Rea (NIR)	**4**–3	John Spencer (ENG)
