= 1963 World Amateur Snooker Championship =

World Amateur Snooker Championship
Tournament information
- City: Calcutta
- Country: India
- Organisation: Billiards Association and Control Club
- Format: Round-robin
- Highest break: Gary Owen (WAL) 71

Final
- Champion: Gary Owen (WAL)
- Runner-up: Frank Harris (AUS)

The 1963 World Amateur Snooker Championship was the first edition of the championship that later became known as the IBSF World Snooker Championship. It was played from 27 December 1963 to 4 January 1964 at the Great Eastern Hotel in Calcutta, India, as a round-robin. Five players participated. Gary Owen won all four of his matches and took the title, with Frank Harris finishing in second place. Owen compiled the highest break of the event, 71.

== Final standings ==
Position	Player	Won	Lost	Frames	Highest break
1	Gary Owen (WAL)	4	0	24-7	71
2	Frank Harris (AUS)	3	1	21–17	52
3	Mohammed Lafir (LKA)	2	2	19–18	67
4	Tony Monteiro (IND)	1	3	14–19	56
5	Wilson Jones (IND)	0	4	7–24	36

=== Match results ===
Player	Score	Player	Ref.
Mohammed Lafir (LKA)	6–2	Wilson Jones (IND)	
Frank Harris (AUS)	6–3	Tony Monteiro (IND)	
Gary Owen (WAL)	6–2	Mohammed Lafir (LKA)	
Frank Harris (AUS)	6–3	Wilson Jones (IND)	
Gary Owen (WAL)	6–1	Tony Monteiro (IND)	
Frank Harris (AUS)	6–5	Mohammed Lafir (LKA)	
Gary Owen (WAL)	6–1	Wilson Jones (IND)	
Tony Monteiro (IND)	6–1	Wilson Jones (IND)	
Gary Owen (WAL)	6–3	Frank Harris (AUS)	
Mohammed Lafir (LKA)	6–4	Tony Monteiro (IND)	
