= 1971 World Snooker Championship =

Snooker tournament, held 1970

Tournament information
- Dates: 28 September – 7 November 1970
- Final venue: Chevron Hotel
- Final city: Sydney
- Country: Australia
- Organisation: B&SCC
- Winner's share: £2,333
- Highest break: Eddie Charlton (AUS) (129)

Final
- Champion: John Spencer (ENG)
- Runner-up: Warren Simpson (AUS)
- Score: 37–29

Venues in New South Wales

The 1971 World Snooker Championship was a professional snooker tournament that took place between 28 September and 7 November 1970 in Australia. The tournament was the 1971 edition of the World Snooker Championship, first held in 1927, but was held in 1970. It was the first time the event had been held outside England outside of two challenge matches in 1965, with matches held at various locations in New South Wales and Brisbane. The event featured nine participants, with a round-robin round producing four qualifiers, who then competed in a single-elimination tournament.

Ray Reardon was the defending champion, having defeated John Pulman in the 1970 final, however Reardon lost to John Spencer in the semi-final. Spencer won the event for the second time by defeating Warren Simpson 37–29 in the final held in the Chevron Hotel in Sydney. Eddie Charlton made the highest break of the tournament with a 129 in the final session of his round-robin match against Gary Owen.

== Overview ==
The World Snooker Championship is a professional tournament and the official world championship of the game of snooker. Founded in the late 19th century by British Army soldiers stationed in India, the sport was popular in the British Isles. However, in the modern era it has become increasingly popular worldwide, especially in East and Southeast Asian nations such as China, Hong Kong and Thailand. (Note: The "modern era" of snooker is understood to have started in 1969, when the World Championship reverted to a knockout format.)

This championship featured nine professional players competing in one-on-one snooker matches in a round-robin format, from which four players qualified to a single elimination format. Each match is played over a predetermined number of frames and sessions. Joe Davis won the first World Championship in 1927, the final match being held in Camkin's Hall, Birmingham, England.

=== Format ===
The championship was held from 28 September to 7 November 1970 at several locations across Australia. This was the first time the championship was held outside the United Kingdom aside from two challenge matches in 1965, and it would be later hosted in Australia again in 1975. The initial stage was a round robin in which the matches were of 37 frames, played across three days, and each competitor played four of the other eight competitors. The number of frames needed to win a match increased at the semi-finals stage. The semi-finals were scheduled to be the best-of-49 and the final as the best-of-73 frames.

== Tournament summary ==
=== Round-robin ===
The first match was held from 28 to 30 September between Paddy Morgan and Warren Simpson. The match was won by Morgan by a score of 21–16. Eddie Charlton and Norman Squire met in the second match, during which Charlton made a break of 106, the first century break of the championship. The British players did not start their matches until 6 October when John Spencer, John Pulman and Gary Owen started their first matches.

Ray Reardon started his first match on 9 October where he defeated Perrie Mans. Spencer made a break of 105 in his second win, over Norman Squire, which finished 27–10. Reardon and Spencer both played again from 12 to 14 October. Reardon beat Charlton, despite Charlton making a break of 116. Spencer defeated John Pulman, with both players making a century break – a 113 by Spencer, and a 102 by Pulman. Simpson met Owen from 13 to 15 October, and trailed 14–17 and 17–18 but won the last two frames to win 19–18.

Owen scored his first century of the tournament in his match against Squire, a break of 102. Owen and Charlton won their second matches and met over the following three days, with Charlton making the highest break of the tournament, a 129. Reardon met Morgan in Brisbane and led 20–10, before Morgan did not appear for the final session, awarding Reardon a 27–10 win. The third win guaranteed his place in the semi-final where he would meet John Spencer. Charlton beat Owen to give him his third win and a place in the semi-final. Simpson then beat Perrie Mans 19–18 to gain the last semi-final place.

=== Knockout rounds ===
The first semi-final, between Charlton and Simpson, was played from 25 to 28 October at Forbes Golf Club. Charlton was involved in a minor traffic collision on the way to the match, and lost each of the first three frames. Simpson led 7–5 after the first day and maintained a 13–11 lead after the second day. The last five frames on the third day was won by Simpson to lead 21–15. Simpson clinched the match of the fourth and final day when he won the third frame of the evening session to lead 25–20. Dead frames were played with the final score being 27–22. The highest break of the match was a 95 by Simpson.

The second semi-final, between Spencer and Reardon, was played from 27 to 30 October at Parramatta Leagues Club, Sydney. Spencer took a 9–3 lead on the first day, however, Reardon made a 108 break during the evening session. Spencer extended his lead to 19–5 after two days and won the match 25–7 on the third evening. Spencer made a break of 106 on the third afternoon and Reardon made one of 109 in a dead frame on the third evening. The match ended with Spencer leading 34–15. Reardon's defeat meant he held the record as the player with the shortest reign as world champion.

The final was held from 2 to 7 November at the Chevron Hotel in Sydney. Spencer led 8–4 after the first day, and 17–7 after the second day. He made a break of 105 on the second afternoon and then made breaks of 126 and 107 in the second and third frames of the evening session. At the half-way stage Simpson had reduced Spencer's lead to 20–16, but missed a number of easy shots as Spencer won nine of the twelve frames on the fourth day to lead 29–19. Spencer was 34–26 ahead by the end of day five, and eventually won the match 37–29 in the final frame of the afternoon session on the sixth day, having led 36–26. The remaining "dead frames" were played, resulting in a final score of 42–31 to Spencer. Spencer won his second world title and earned £2,333. Simpson had reached the final at his first attempt.

== Results ==
=== Round-robin stage ===
Round-robin results
Match	Winner	Score	Runner up	Dates	Venue	Ref.
1	Paddy Morgan (Australia)	21–16	Warren Simpson (Australia)	28–30 September	Kings Cross RSL Club, Sydney	
2	Eddie Charlton (Australia)	27–10	Norman Squire (Australia)	2–4 October	Kurri Kurri RSL Club	
3	John Spencer (England)	20–17	Perrie Mans (South Africa)	6–8 October	Canterbury-Bankstown Leagues Club, Sydney	
4	Warren Simpson (Australia)	22–15	John Pulman (England)	6–8 October	South Newcastle Leagues Club, Newcastle	
5	Gary Owen (Wales)	26–11	Paddy Morgan (Australia)	6–8 October	Wentworthville RSL Club, Sydney	
6	John Spencer (England)	27–10	Norman Squire (Australia)	9–11 October	Lithgow Workers' Club	
7	Ray Reardon (Wales)	21–16	Perrie Mans (South Africa)	9–11 October	Wingham RSL Club	
8	John Spencer (England)	23–14	John Pulman (England)	12–14 October	Wagga Wagga RSL Club	
9	Ray Reardon (Wales)	21–16	Eddie Charlton (Australia)	12–14 October	Wallsend RSL Club, Newcastle	
10	Warren Simpson (Australia)	19–18	Gary Owen (Wales)	13–15 October	Dubbo Ex-Servicemen's Club	
11	John Pulman (England)	25–12	Paddy Morgan (Australia)	15–17 October	Coogee-Randwick RSL Club, Sydney	
12	Gary Owen (Wales)	19–18	Norman Squire (Australia)	17–19 October	Port Macquarie RSL Club	
13	Eddie Charlton (Australia)	26–11	Perrie Mans (South Africa)	17–19 October	Nambucca Heads RSL Club	
14	Ray Reardon (Wales)	27–10 (Note: Morgan missed the final session in his match against Reardon. Reardon had won the match and was leading 20–10.)	Paddy Morgan (Australia)	19–21 October	Queensland Masonic Club, Brisbane	
15	Eddie Charlton (Australia)	23–14	Gary Owen (Wales)	20–22 October	City Tattersalls Club, Sydney	
16	Warren Simpson (Australia)	19–18	Perrie Mans (South Africa)	21–23 October	Griffith Ex-Servicemen's Club	
17	John Pulman (England)	26–11	Norman Squire (Australia)	21–23 October	Parramatta RSL Club, Sydney	
18	Ray Reardon (Wales)	21–16	John Spencer (England)	22–24 October	Lismore Workers' Club	

=== Table ===
Round-robin table
Pos	Player	Pld	MW	ML	FW	FL	FD	Pts
1	(Wales) **Ray Reardon**	4	4	0	90	58	+32	**8**
2	(Australia) **Eddie Charlton**	4	3	1	92	56	+36	**6**
3	(England) **John Spencer**	4	3	1	86	62	+24	**6**
4	(Australia) **Warren Simpson**	4	3	1	76	72	+4	**6**
5	(England) John Pulman	4	2	2	80	68	+12	4
6	(Wales) Gary Owen	4	2	2	77	71	+6	4
7	(Australia) Paddy Morgan	4	1	3	54	94	−40	2
8	(South Africa) Perrie Mans	4	0	4	62	86	−24	0
9	(Australia) Norman Squire	4	0	4	49	99	−50	0

=== Knockout stage ===
The remaining four players contested a knockout round. The basis on which the semi-final draw was organised is not known. The 22 October edition of The Sydney Morning Herald reports that Reardon would play Spencer in the second semi-final. At the time Reardon and Spencer still had to play each other and Charlton, Owen and Simpson also had one match to play. So the final order of the group was still undecided. Snooker historian Clive Everton has speculated that the draw was changed "behind the scenes ... perhaps to ensure an Australian finalist." The draw and results from the semi-finals and final are shown below. Players in bold denote match winners.

**Semi-finals**; 49 frames
(Australia) Eddie Charlton	22
(Australia) **Warren Simpson**	**27**
(England) **John Spencer**	**34**
(Wales) Ray Reardon	15

**Final**; Best of 73 frames
(Australia) Warren Simpson	29
(England) **John Spencer**	**37**

=== Final ===
Frame scores in bold are winning scores.

Final: Best of 73 frames. Sydney. November 1970
**John Spencer** (England)	**37**–29	Warren Simpson; Australia
First day: **62**–20, **98**–18, 32–**88**, 43–**62**, **65**–58, **125**–7, **71**–34, 26–**65**, **62**–35, **79**–24, 44–**66**, **84**–18 (ended 8–4); Second day: **80**–34, **50**–45, 44–**74**, 51–**65**, **66**–56, **122**–2; 35–**54**, **126**–6, **110**–15, 64–**67**, **60**–50, **93**–45 (ended 17–7); Third day: **85**–21, 23–**57**, 22–**78**, **66**–42, 47–**73**, **54**–42; 25–**73**, 45–**57**, 18–**90**, 34–**66**, 53–**62**, 10–**86** (ended 20–16); Fourth day: **75**–35, 18–**52**, **65**–55, 10–**78**, **76**–73, **69**–33; 22–**68**, **69**–22, **86**–39, **99**–27, **63**–34, **48**–32 (ended 29–19); Fifth day: 40–**58**, 54–**76**, **75**–33, 52–**58**, **81**–50, **66**–46; **61**–55, 48–**70**, **113**–5, 58–**66**, 8–**101**, 15–**111** (ended 34–26); Sixth day: **63**–41, **80**–23, 49–**62**, 59–**68**, 40–**49**, **75**–33; 46–**83**, **68**–44, 20–**103**, **68**–51, **115**–11, **68**–35, **74**–67 (ended 42–31; winning margin was reached at 37–29)
