= Norman Squire =

Australian Snooker player (1909–1974)

Personal information
- Born: 22 November 1909 Christchurch, New Zealand
- Died: 23 December 1974 (aged 65) Sydney, Australia

Sport
- Country: Australia
- Sport: Snooker
- Professional: 1962?–1974

Norman Powell Squire (born 22 November 1909, in Christchurch, New Zealand, † 23 December 1974 in Sydney, Australia) was an Australian snooker player.

Squire was born in 1909 in Christchurch, New Zealand to a bricklayer father. He attended a public school and a year of technical college.

In 1935 Squire emigrated to Sydney on the advice of snooker player Edward James O'Donoghue, who recognized his talent. He trained for a long time and got better and better. In 1939, he married Annie Ross (d.1965). In 1943 he went to the Royal Australian Air Force as an aircraft mechanic and spent two years there. The Second World War ruined his chances of a career in snooker. Horace Lindrum had allegedly been reluctant to accept his challenge for the Australian snooker title in 1944. Nevertheless, he trained at the air force and became a professional snooker at the age of over 50.

== Playing career ==
The sport recovered only slowly in the next decade. It was not until the 1960s, that he recorded his best performances in international competition. On a tour of South Africa in 1963 he made a 147 break. Back in Sydney the following year, he beat some key players in a snooker competition which included Eddie Charlton and Lindrum, winning all ten frames and not losing one. Norman Squire later won the Australian Professional Championship in 1964.

In July 1969 he won the Australian Professional Billiard Championship, beating Warren Simpson and Charlton in a round-robin tournament; soon afterwards he defeated the veteran New Zealand player Clark McConachy for the Australasian billiard title. In the 1970 Australian Professional Snooker Championship he failed against Charlton after he had won against Simpson and lost to Paddy Morgan. With this third place Squire was in the tournaments of the 1970/71 snooker season to participate.

Squire competed at the 1971 World Snooker Championship which was held across Australia, but finished with defeats to Eddie Charlton, John Spencer, Gary Owen and John Pulman to finish last place at the round-robin stage. After this season he lost the right to participate due to a lack of success. Squire always took part in the Australian Professional Championship until 1974, but he often lost first round matches. When he last played, Squire defeated Gary Owen 11–9, but then lost to Warren Simpson.

== Personal life ==
After divorcing his first wife, he married Paula Margaret Taylor in 1969. Besides snooker, his hobbies were gambling with horse racing and dogs.

He died of a heart attack in 1974 while playing snooker at the City Tattersalls Club in Sydney. During the game, a cash prize of $6,000 was played.
