= Paddy Morgan =

Former professional snooker player

Patrick Morgan
Personal information
- Born: 7 January 1943 (age 83) Belfast, Northern Ireland

Sport
- Country: Australia
- Sport: Snooker
- Professional: 1970–1992
- Highest ranking: 21 (1976/1977)

Paddy Morgan (born 7 January 1943) is an Australian former professional snooker and English billiards player. He was born in Belfast, and moved to Coventry in 1960. Following an amateur career in which he won junior and national titles in both sports, and reached the semi-finals of the 1968 World Amateur Snooker Championship, he emigrated to Australia in 1969. He became a professional player in 1970 and competed in the World Snooker Championship for the first time in the 1971 tournament.

In 1972, he was runner-up to Leslie Driffield in the World Open Billiards Championship, which featured both amateurs and professionals competing against each other, losing the final 2,404–3,055. In snooker, he defeated Dennis Taylor and Alex Higgins to reach the semi-finals of the 1976 World Professional Match-play Championship. Morgan was twice runner-up in the Australian Professional Snooker Championship (in 1976 and 1977). He was a member of the Australia team at the World Cup of snooker each year from 1979 to 1982. He made his final professional appearance in the 1991 World Snooker Championship.

== Early life ==
Patrick Morgan was born on 7 January 1943 in Belfast. He started playing English billiards aged nine, at St Patrick's Parochial Hall. Coached by Tom McCann, Morgan won the Under-16 British Junior English Billiards Championship in January 1958, with a 400–260 victory over David Bend in the final. He also won the Under-19 title twice; in 1959, 446–321 against Peter Shelley, and in 1961, 538–357 against Tony Matthews. In 1959 he entered the British Junior Snooker Championship, and lost 2–3 to Bend in the semi-finals after taking a 2–0 lead. In the deciding frame, Morgan potted the final black ball, but went in off, which cost him the match.

Aged 15, Morgan was expelled from St Mary's Christian Brothers' School after consistently missing classes to play the game. In January 1960 he moved to Coventry, where he worked as a machinist, and later as a bus conductor. In 1964, he won both the Northern Ireland Amateur Snooker Championship, against M. Gill in the final, and the All-Ireland Snooker Championship, defeating J. Rogers. He won the All-Ireland title again in 1967, this time against Dessie Anderson, and also won the 1967 Irish Amateur Snooker Championship title against Rogers. In billiards, he was Northern Ireland runner-up to Anderson in 1966, and All-Ireland champion in 1967 (against Billy Loughan) and 1968 (against Anderson).

He represented Ireland at the 1968 World Amateur Snooker Championship, held in Australia, and reached the semi-final of the competition where he lost 3–8 to David Taylor, who went on to win the event. Morgan emigrated to Australia in 1969, supported by billiards professional Murt O'Donoghue.

== Professional career ==
=== 1970s ===
Morgan turned professional in 1970. He participated in the 1971 World Snooker Championship, losing matches against John Pulman, Ray Reardon and Gary Owen, but winning his match against Warren Simpson. In 1972, Morgan won the Australian national billiards title against Albert Johnson, and held it unchallenged until defeated 3,238–3,608 by Robby Foldvari in 1985.

A World Open Billiards Championship, with both amateurs and professionals competing against each other, was held in 1972. Morgan finished fourth in the round-robin table with seven wins from eleven matches, which included victories against Clark McConachy, Clive Everton, and Jack Karnehm. He reached the final by defeating Eddie Charlton and Satish Mohan, and finished runner-up to Leslie Driffield, 2,404–3,055.

In 1974, Morgan defeated 1972 World Snooker champion Alex Higgins in the final of a professional tournament held at the Westpoint Shopping Centre, Blacktown, Sydney, by winning the first four frames in their best-of-seven frames match. Ian Anderson and Simpson also played in the tournament. He lost 3–37 to Higgins in the final of the Victorian Professional Championship held in Melbourne the following month. At the 1974 World Snooker Championship, Morgan progressed to the second round by defeating Cliff Thorburn 8–4 in the first round. In Thorburn's autobiography, he claims that after Morgan lost the first frame, he took his tie off, then after Thorburn went 3–1 up, Morgan took his waistcoat off, and after the score went to 4–1, Morgan drop kicked his chalk out of the arena. Thorburn states that he had difficulty settling after that and lost the next seven frames to allow Morgan to progress to the second round, where he lost 7–15 to Graham Miles. In the 1975 Championship he faced Thorburn again, and lost 6–15 in the first round.

The 1976 Australian Professional Snooker Championship was promoted by Charlton, through his eponymous company. Charlton played his quarter-final and semi-final using his personal set of snooker balls, on a table of his choosing at the venue, finishing his final on 30 September. He stipulated that the final, scheduled for 4 October, would be played under the same conditions. Morgan and his opponent Simpson had both faced lengthy journeys to their previous matches and were scheduled to finish their match on 3 October. Four days before the final was due to commence, Morgan and Simpson agreed to tell Charlton that whichever of them won the semi-final would refuse to play him unless what they saw as the advantages that Charlton would gain from playing with his own set of balls on a table of his choosing were removed. Morgan defeated Simpson 19–11 and then travelled from their match location in Muswellbrook, New South Wales, to Sydney, then flew to Melbourne the following morning, the day the final was due to start. When he arrived, he discovered that the match had been set up on the same table as Charlton had played his previous matches on, with the same balls, and refused to play. Charlton claimed victory by walkover, a decision which was confirmed by seven votes to six by the Australian Professional Players Association, chaired by Charlton.

At the 1976 World Professional Match-play Championship, which despite the name was not an edition of snooker's world championship, Morgan recorded a 13–12 win against Dennis Taylor and a 13–6 defeat of Alex Higgins to reach the semi-finals, where he faced Charlton. Morgan led 16–14 at the start of their final session in the best-of-37 frames match, and increased this to 17–14 before Charlton won the next three frames to equalise. Morgan then regained a lead at 18–17, but Charlton took the following two frames to progress to the final after the deciding frame, 19–18. A break of 104 by Morgan was the highest of the tournament. Morgan and Charlton both qualified for the final of the 1977 Australian Professional Championship, played as the best of 25 frames. Morgan led 7–5 and later 13–11, before Charlton took the lead. Morgan was a single frame behind at 21–22, but Charlton won the next four frames to secure his 17th national title in 18 years. Morgan did not reach the national championship final again. He exited the 1978 World Snooker Championship after his first match in the qualifying competition, defeated 7–9 by David Taylor, and at his next appearance, in 1980, eliminated Paul Thornley 9–4 before being whitewashed 0–9 by Steve Davis.

After an international team event was introduced in professional snooker in 1979, Morgan was one of the three members of the Australia team in the 1979 World Challenge Cup, and at subsequent events in 1980, 1981 and 1982. At the November 1980 World Professional Billiards Championship (the first time the championship had been held as a knockout rather than as a challenge match since 1934), he defeated John Dunning 1,655–1,107 in qualifying but then lost 978–1,907 to eventual champion Fred Davis in the quarter-finals.

=== 1980s and 1990s ===
In the 1981 World Snooker Championship qualifying competition, Morgan lost in the first round to Eddie Sinclair 8–9 and the following year he progressed past David Greaves 9–2 before losing 1–9 to Silvino Francisco. His last World Championship qualifying match victory was at the 1983 World Championship, 10–9 on the final black ball against Pascal Burke. Morgan was them eliminated 6–10 by Miles in the following round.

Morgan moved back to the United Kingdom for the 1983–84 snooker season so that he could compete in more professional events. In the qualifying rounds of the 1983 International Open, he defeated Jack Fitzmaurice and Fred Davis before being eliminated by John Spencer. He won a play-off against Everton and Tony Meo after they had finished level in their first-stage qualifying group for the 1984 International Masters, but lost to both David Taylor and Dave Martin at the second stage. In 1984 he again lost in the World Professional Billiards championship quarter-final to the player who went on to win the tournament, this time 759–1,347 to Mark Wildman, after qualifying by defeating Bernard Bennett 1,021–639.

From the 1984–85 snooker season, Morgan participated only in Australian tournaments and qualifying rounds of the World Snooker Championship, having moved back to Australia because his family preferred the climate there. In late 1990, Morgan announced that he would travel to compete in the 1991 billiards and snooker championships. According to a report in Snooker Scene magazine the following year, Morgan's playing career had been "spoilt by eye trouble". Morgan had been diagnosed with astigmatism in about 1985, and started playing whilst wearing adjustable spectacles. At the 1991 UK Professional Billiards Championship, he lost 211–1,482 in his first match, against Mike Russell, and he did not enter the world billiards championship. Morgan's last professional snooker appearance was at the 1991 World Snooker Championship, where he lost 7–10 to Thornley in the first qualifying round. Play finished at 1:50 am. In Snooker Scene, Phil Yates described the match as a "dirge". Morgan was due to compete the following season, but did not play any matches. The highest professional ranking attained by Morgan was 21st, in the snooker world rankings 1976/1977, the first official ranking list published by the World Professional Billiards and Snooker Association.

From 1984 until at least 1997, Morgan was resident professional at Tattersalls Club in Sydney.

== Career finals ==
=== Amateur ===
English Billiards
Outcome	No.	Year	Championship	Opponent in the final	Score	Ref.
Winner	1.	1958	British Junior Billiards Championship (Under-16)	David Bend	400–260	
Winner	2.	1959	British Junior Billiards Championship (Under-19)	Peter Shelley	446–321	
Winner	3.	1959	British Junior Billiards Championship (Under-19)	Tony Matthews	538–357	
Runner-up	1.	1966	Northern Ireland Billiards Championship	Dessie Anderson	833–1,200	
Winner	3.	1967	All-Ireland Billiards Championship	Billy Loughan	unknown	
Winner	3.	1968	All-Ireland Billiards Championship	Dessie Anderson	750–742	

Snooker
Outcome	No.	Year	Championship	Opponent in the final	Ref.
Winner		1964	Northern Ireland Amateur Snooker Championship	M. Gill	
Winner		1964	All-Ireland Snooker Championship	J. Rogers	
Winner		1967	All-Ireland Snooker Championship	Dessie Anderson	
Winner		1967	Irish Amateur Snooker Championship	J. Rogers	

=== Professional ===
English Billiards
Outcome	No.	Year	Championship	Opponent in the final	Score	Ref.
Runner-up	1.	1972	World Open Billiards Championship	Leslie Driffield	2,404–3,0555	

Snooker
Outcome	No.	Year	Championship	Opponent in the final	Score	Ref.
Winner	1.	1974	Sydney Professional Tournament	(Northern Ireland) Alex Higgins	4–0	
Runner-up	1.	1976	Australian Professional Championship	(Australia) Eddie Charlton	walkover	
Runner-up	2.	1977	Australian Professional Championship	(Australia) Eddie Charlton	21–25	
