= 1969 World Snooker Championship =

Professional snooker tournament

Player's No.6 World Snooker Championship
Tournament information
- Dates: 18 November 1968 – 22 March 1969
- Final venue: Victoria Hall
- Final city: London
- Country: England
- Organisation: BACC
- Format: Ranking event
- Total prize fund: £3,500
- Winner's share: £1,300

Final
- Champion: John Spencer (ENG)
- Runner-up: Gary Owen (WAL)
- Score: 37–24

The 1969 World Snooker Championship (also known as the Player's No.6 World Snooker Championship for sponsorship reasons) was a professional snooker tournament. It was the first World Snooker Championship in a knock-out format since 1957, following a series of challenge matches from 1964 to 1968. John Spencer won the title, defeating Gary Owen by achieving a winning margin at 37 frames to 24 in the final. Spencer had earlier eliminated defending champion John Pulman from the competition, in the quarter-finals.

There were eight players who entered the championship, including four competition debutants. The quarter-finals and semi-finals were staged at several venues in England from 18 November 1968 until 22 February 1969, and the final was held at Victoria Hall in London from 17 to 22 March 1969. As champion, Spencer received £1,300 from the total prize fund of £3,500. The 1969 championship is regarded as the first of the modern snooker era.

== Background ==
The World Snooker Championship is a professional tournament and the official world championship of the game of snooker. The sport was developed in the late 19th century by British Army soldiers stationed in India. Professional English billiards player and billiard hall manager Joe Davis noticed the increasing popularity of snooker compared to billiards in the 1920s, and with Birmingham-based billiards equipment manager Bill Camkin, persuaded the Billiards Association and Control Council (BACC) to recognise an official professional snooker championship in the 1926–27 season. In 1927, the final of the first professional snooker championship was held at Camkin's Hall; Davis won the tournament by beating Tom Dennis in the final. The annual competition was not titled the World Championship until 1935, but the 1927 tournament is now referred to as the first World Snooker Championship. Davis also won the title each year until 1940, when the contest was cancelled during World War II, and again when the championship resumed in 1946, accumulating a total of 15 titles before retiring from the event.

In 1952, the, following a dispute between the Professional Billiards Players' Association (PBPA) and the BACC about the distribution of income from the world championship, the PBPA members established an alternative competition known as the World Professional Match-play Championship, the editions of which are now recognised as world championships, whilst only Horace Lindrum and Clark McConachy entered for the BACC's 1952 World Snooker Championship. The World Professional Match-play Championship continued until 1957, after which there were no world championship matches until professional Rex Williams gained agreement from the BACC that the world championship would be staged on a challenge basis, with defending champion Pulman featuring in the first match. Pulman retained the title in several challenges from 1964 to 1968. Pulman had been touring snooker clubs as promotional work for the tobacco brand John Player, and the company had sponsored his 1968 match against Eddie Charlton. The good attendances for the championship match led to John Player deciding to sponsor the 1969 World Snooker Championship as a knock-out format tournament, using their "Players No. 6" brand. The total prize fund was £3,500, equivalent to £72,763 in 2023, including £1,300 for the champion. The 1969 championship is regarded as the first of the modern snooker era.

== Tournament summary ==
The closing date for players to enter the championship was 30 June 1968. There were eight entrants: four of whom had played professionally in the 1950s and four championship debutants. The new players were John Spencer, Ray Reardon, Gary Owen, and Bernard Bennett. Defending champion Pulman was drawn to meet Spencer, who had recently defeated him 14–17 in a non-title challenge match.

=== Quarter-finals ===
The first match, played from 18 to 22 November 1968 at the Wryton Stadium in Bolton, saw the end of Pulman's reign as champion, when he was defeated by Spencer. Spencer took a 4–0 lead, and ended the first session 4–2 ahead. Spencer compiled a 110 break in the 18th frame, on his way to establishing a 13–5 lead at the end of the second day. Spencer led 24–18 after the final afternoon session and clinched the match by winning the first frame in the evening with what was reported in The Times as a "magnificent 97 break".

Owen faced Jackie Rea at the Hippodrome, Stratford-upon-Avon, from 25 to 28 November 1968. The players each won three frames in the first afternoon session. Rea took the first in the evening, before Owen claimed five consecutive frames to end the first day 8–4 ahead. On the second afternoon, the players again won three frames apiece, with Owen compiling a 68 break that turned out to be the highest break of the match. Rea took the first three frames of the evening session, to move to 10–11, then Owen won two of the next three for a 13–11 overnight lead. Owen increased his lead by winning four of the six frames on the third afternoon, and maintained it by adding three of the six evening frames, leading 20–16 going into the last day.

The match between Williams and Bennett was played from 25 to 28 November 1968 at the Marlands Hall in Southampton. Williams took all six frames in the first session, and achieved a winning margin at 25–4. Williams compiled a 107 break in the third frame of the fourth session, and, after dead frames were played, finished 38–11 ahead.

The fourth quarter-final, between Fred Davis and Reardon, was not played until January 1969 because Reardon was touring South Africa. The match was played at the Tunstall British Legion, Stoke-on-Trent, from 20 to 24 January. The match featured lengthy tactical exchanges between the players, resulting in some of the longest sessions ever to take place in world championship history to that point. No player was ahead by more than two frames until Reardon took the 27th frame to lead 15–12, after which Davis won six successive frames to leave Reardon three frames behind at 15–18. Later, having been three frames down with six to play, Davis levelled the match at 24–24. Davis won in the deciding frame after a break of 52 and some smaller scoring visits, with Reardon conceding the frame at 64 points behind with one red ball remaining. The highest break of the match was 89, scored by Reardon.

=== Semi-finals ===
The two youngest players to have entered the tournament, Spencer, aged 33, and Williams, aged 35, contested the first semi-final, held at the Co-op Hall, Bolton, from 10 to 15 February. Spencer took a 9–0 lead, and was 11–1 ahead after the first day. Williams won the first two frames of the third day, and, after Spencer had taken the 15th frame, Williams added the 16th frame on a re-spotted black. The second day finished with Spencer leading 19–5, and the score was 29–7 after he won ten of the twelve frames on day three. Spencer achieved a winning margin at 37–12, and finished at 55–18 after dead frames were played.

The second semi final, between Owen and Davis, was held at the Wolstanton Miners Club, Stoke-on-Trent, from 17 to 22 February. Owen took a four frame lead at the start of the match. Davis won the fifth and sixth frames, before Owen claimed the last three frames of the afternoon session followed by all six frames in the evening session for an 11–2 lead. After winning the third session 4–3 and the fourth session 5–2, Owen's lead at the end of the second day was 19–7. Taking ten of thirteen frames on day three, Owen extended his advantage to 29–10. The fourth day saw Davis reduce the deficit to twelve frames, at 20–32. On day five, the afternoon session ended with Owen 36–23 ahead, and, after Davis has made a break of 83 in the 60th frame, Owen achieved a winning margin at 37–24. After dead frames, Owen finished 45–28 ahead.

=== Final ===
The final was held at Victoria Hall, London, from 17 to 22 March. Spencer took a 6–2 lead, before Owen levelled the match at 6–6, having made the first day's highest break of 80 in the 9th frame. The Birmingham Daily Post correspondent praised the players for bringing a "refreshing new look to the game, with bold attacking play, wonderful potting, and a sprinkling of good-sized breaks". On the second day, both players missed easy pots, sharing the first two frames for 7–7 before Spencer won the next four frames to lead 11–7 by the interval, after which he added four of the subsequent six frames to increase his advantage to six frames at 15–9. The third day's play, which featured only two breaks of 50 or more, was described in the Coventry Evening Telegraph as "undistinguished", and ended with Spencer still six frames ahead, at 21–15. On day 4, Owen won four of the afternoon session's six frames to close to 19–23. In the evening session, Spencer claimed the first three frames, and finished the day six frames ahead again at 27–21. Owen only won three of the twelve frames on the fifth day, leaving Spencer one frame from victory at 36–24. Owen's brother Marcus Owen, a former English Amateur Championship winner, commented that "Gary's cueing is all over the place. Every time he plays a forcing shot, his whole body is moving." Spencer took the first frame on the final day to claim victory by achieving a winning margin of 37–24. The remaining 12 dead frames were played, with Spencer finishing 46–27 ahead. With this he became the first player to win the World Championship at his first attempt since Joe Davis at the inaugural championship in 1927. Owen compiled a 100 break, the highest of the match, in the 66th frame after the title had been decided.

Snooker historian Clive Everton commented that although Spencer only recorded a small number of breaks above 60, "in every other respect, the new champion's display was a revelation. His long potting, his prodigious screw shots even when cue-ball and object-ball were seven or eight feet apart, his uninhibited use of side, his bright attacking style, even the mere fact that here was a bright new face, made Spencer's win a memorable one."

== Main draw ==
Match results are shown below. Winning players and scores are denoted in bold text.

**Quarter-finals**; Best of 49 frames
John Pulman (ENG) | 18
**John Spencer (ENG)** | **25**
**Rex Williams (ENG)** | **25**
Bernard Bennett (ENG) | 4
**Gary Owen (WAL)** | **25**
Jackie Rea (NIR) | 17
**Fred Davis (ENG)** | **25**
Ray Reardon (WAL) | 24

**Semi-finals**; Best of 73 frames
**John Spencer (ENG)** | **37**
Rex Williams (ENG) | 12
**Gary Owen (WAL)** | **37**
Fred Davis (ENG) | 24

**Final**; Best of 73 frames
**John Spencer (ENG)** | **37**
Gary Owen (WAL) | 24

=== Final ===
Final: Best of 73 frames. Referee: Harold Phillips; Victoria Hall, London, 17–22 March 1969.
| **John Spencer**; England | **46**–27 | Gary Owen; Wales |
Day 1: **81**(**60**)–35, 35–**72**, 17–**76**, **64**–43, **94**(**53**)–20, **75**–73, **55**–25, **76**–25, 23–**96**(**80**), 40–**82**(**52**), 27–**87**(**70**), 50–**62**; Day 2: **91**(**58**)–27, 27–**69**, **64**–33, **68**–54, **71**–43, **76**–21, **85**–8, 33–**62**, **69**–41, **95**(**59**)–40, **112**(**62**)–15, 21–**95**(**61**); Day 3: 40–**69**, 37–**64**, **79**–41, 11–**76**, **60**–24, 18–**78**, 42–**54**, **122**(**56**)–11, **87**–22, **82**(**55**)–9, 50–**72**, **62**–47; Day 4: 47–**57**, **76**–26, 44–**56**, **62**(**60**)–24, 7–**64**, 44–**55**, **75**–34, **54**–39, **57**–46, 12–**82**(**57**), 54–**67**(**47**), **92**–31; Day 5: **98**(**77**)–1, **67**–48, **71**–26, 43–**67**, 38–**84**, **80**(**73**)–8, **77**–1, **68**–55, **62**–52, **69**–23, 9–**88**(**50**), **73**–29; Day 6: **78**–35, **101**–21, **89**–44, **70**–41, **73**–64, 19–**108**(**100**), **62**–51, 51–**63**, **90**–32, **104**–17, 58–**85**, **64**–53, **94**–34
| 77 | Highest break | **100** |
| 0 | Century breaks | **1** |
| **10** | 50+ breaks | 7 |
Spencer achieved a winning margin at 37–24. Dead frames were played.
