= City Tattersalls Club =

Social club in Sydney, Australia

Coordinates: 33°52′16.33″S 151°12′30.8″E

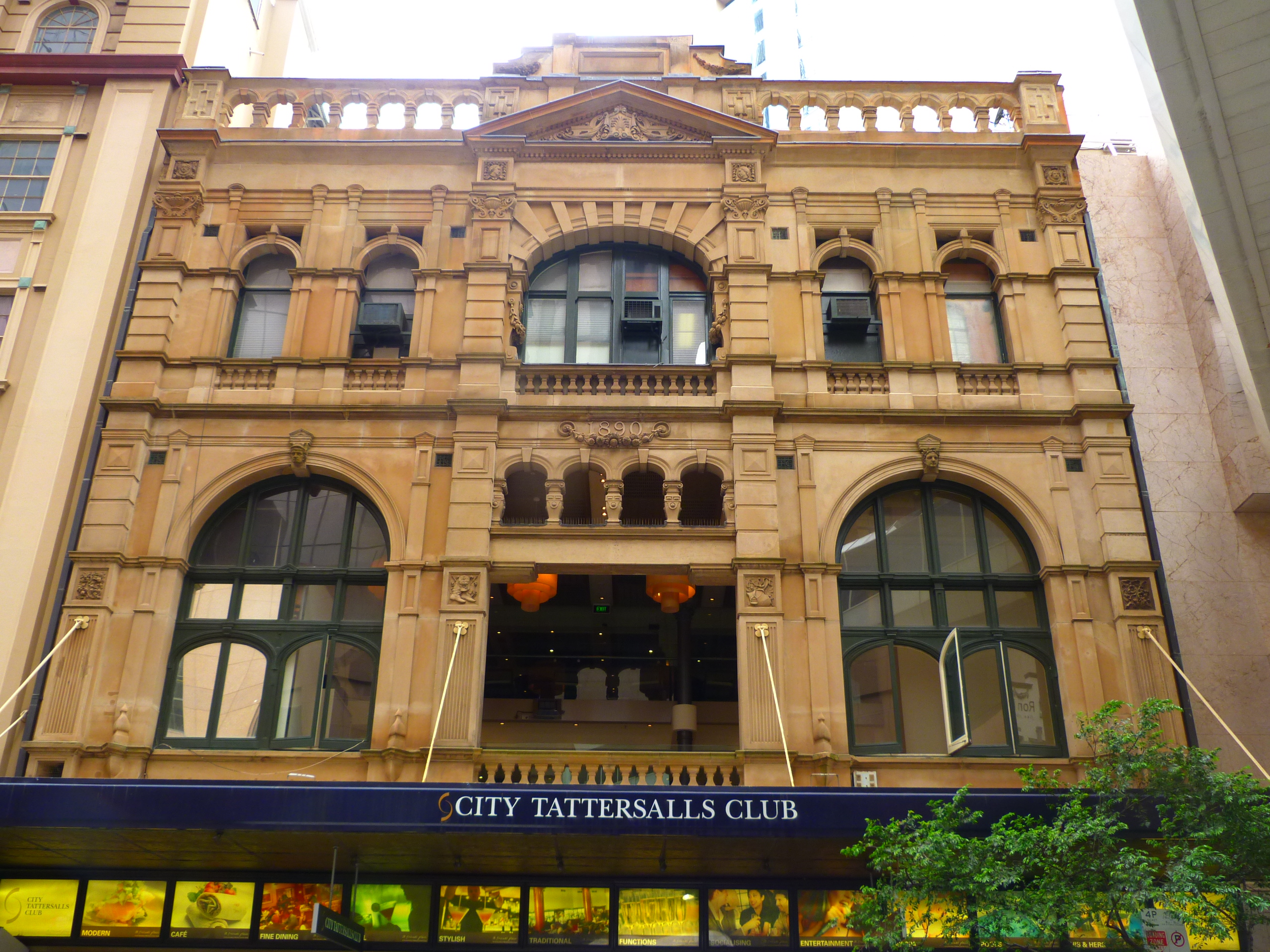
- City Tattersalls Club building
- Industry: Social club
- Founded: 1895
- Headquarters: Sydney
- Number of employees: 200
- Website: citytatts.com.au

The City Tattersalls Club is a social club in Sydney. The club was formed in 1895 by a group of bookmakers disgruntled with a judge's decision on a race at Kensington, New South Wales. The club named itself after the Tattersalls Club, Sydney, which was founded in 1858 and represented the horse racing establishment. The club is located in the heart of the central business district at Pitt Street between Market and Park Streets.

== History ==
'City Tattersalls Club started in 1895 with only 25 members, all bookmakers. The club began with only 50 guineas in the bank.

On 26 April 1895, Merry Girl – at 6/1 – was the first horse past the post at Kensington. Although the five-year-old mare appeared to have triumphed, the stewards disqualified her because she turned the scales two pounds overweight and her jockey weighed in with his whip. Thus, Pearl Powder, a four-year-old mare who ran second at 5/2 was declared the winner. Standing to lose substantially on such a heavily backed winner, and believing Merry Girl's connections should have appealed, the paddock bookmakers refused to pay out.

It was the last race of the day and then they turned up at Kensington the following Thursday, their leader refused an official request to settle. As a result, all the paddock bookmakers were escorted from the course. No doubt whooping with joy, the St Leger bookmakers were invited to take their places where the serious money was wagered.

These banished bookmakers were members of the Australian Bookmakers' Association with headquarters at the Tattersalls Club at 202–204 Pitt Street, which had considerable control over racing in New South Wales.

Founded in 1858, Tattersall's took its name from Richard Tattersall, the English horse dealer who established the modern concept of horseracing with fair betting rules. It likely also took the name from the Tattersalls Club in Sydney.

The Pearl Powder dispute dragged on for several weeks.

While profiting from the situation, members of the St Leger Bookmakers Association felt they should now have their own club to go to with their new-found respectability.

On 30 August 1895, one of their enterprising leaders, George Langley, convened a meeting at Her Majesty's Hotel at which it was resolved that all present form themselves into a club, to be called City Tattersalls Club. The 25 men at the meeting started the financial ball rolling by subscribing to two guineas each and agreeing to pay two shillings a week.

City Tattersalls Club has its own Act of Parliament, with an Honorary Committee comprising a chairman, vice-chairman, and seven committee members, all of whom are now elected by those who hold either Gold or Silver Membership, and who protect the interests of members by overseeing the strategies of the executive management. The management is headed by four Executive Managers, the Head of Operations, the Head of Finance, the Head of Gaming, and the Head of Communications and Marketing.

== Location ==
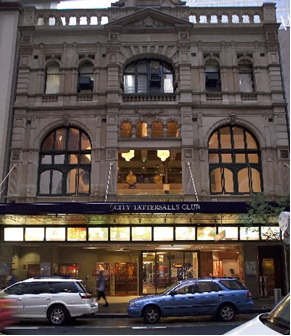
Front view from Pitt Street, Sydney

City Tattersalls Club previously occupied the Graphic Arts building and the building alongside Adams Hotel, where the Sydney Hilton Hotel now stands.

During the 1950s, a film company was located on the top floor, with its vault on the roof, presumably so that when film exploded the burst would go upward.

In December 1992, 'Silks Bar and Grill' was born. During the 90s, Sydney was seeing an upgrade of office blocks and shopping arcades; City Tattersalls Club was ageing, exclusive, and ran a strict dress code.

The Silks Bar and Grill opening was strategic, as it allowed the club to capitalise on the Government of New South Wales 5-kilometre ruling, allowing residents outside a five kilometres (3.1 mi) radius to simply sign into a registered club. Being a separate entrance, this protected the main membership of the City Tattersalls Club.

After approval by its board members in 2007 City Tattersalls Club purchased the Merivale building at 194 Pitt Street and took back its occupancy of 196 Pitt Street previously occupied by National Australia Bank.

In July 2022 City Tattersalls Club temporarily closed its famous Pitt Street building for a major redevelopment which includes a refurbishment of the existing facilities while paying respect to its heritage, and the construction of a hotel and 256 residential apartments.

While the redevelopment is taking place, City Tattersalls Club has opened three other venues in Sydney's CBD for members and guests to enjoy. They are The St James at 114 Castlereagh Street, The Castlereagh at 199 Castlereagh Street, and The Barracks at 5–7 Barrack Street.

The Castlereagh is operated in partnership with celebrity chef Colin Fassnidge.

== History and milestones ==
The City Tattersalls Club building at 202–204 Pitt Street was occupied from 1891. Built at a small cost by today's standards, the building was described as presenting a free and effective rendering of the classic Renaissance style of architecture. It was constructed of Pyrmont, New South Wales freestone, finished in rubble masonry, relieved by handsome pilasters balustrades, moulded Courses, and carved enrichments which were said to "combine to produce a striking though harmonious effect". The rearing horse figure which surmounted the building until 2007 was carved from a single block of stone measuring 200 cu ft (5.7 m^{3}). City Tattersalls bought the building in 1975 at a fraction of its value in its centenary year. City Tattersalls' second home, premises at 240 Pitt Street with a narrow frontage was occupied until moving to the present site in 1924. The old building exists today with the club's name still discernible on the front fascia.

In 1930, Amy Johnson spent six weeks touring Australia after she circumnavigated the world at public events attended by cheering crowds at the City Tattersalls Club by posing on the club's front balcony at Pitt Street.

- 1858 Tattersall's first formed
- 1891 First Tattersalls Club moved into 202–204 Pitt Street
- 1895 Opening of City Tattersalls Club
- 1903 249 Pitt Street purchased
- 1924 Move into current premises at 198–204 Pitt Street
- 1930 Amy Johnson welcomed by the club after her world flight
- 1963 Opening of membership to women
- 1971 Snooker table dedicated to Norman Squire at the World Snooker Championship 1971
- 1992 Silks Bar and Grill opened
- 1995 City Tattersalls Club Centenary year
- 2005 Major renovations to key venues including Omega Lounge
- 2012 Re-launch of website offering online new memberships and renewals using PayPal
- 2020 City Tattersalls Club celebrated its 125th anniversary
- 2022 The famous Pitt Street clubhouse was temporarily closed for a major redevelopment. It's expected to be completed in late 2026.
