= Gary Owen (snooker player) =

Welsh snooker player (1929–1995)

Gary Owen MBE
- Owen in 1950

Personal information
- Born: 5 March 1929 Tumble, Wales
- Died: 1995 (aged 65) Brisbane, Queensland, Australia

Sport
- Country: Wales, Australia
- Sport: Snooker
- Professional: 1967–1979
- Highest ranking: 10 (1976/77)

Gary Owen (5 March 1929 – July 1995) was a Welsh-Australian snooker player. Winning the 1963 English Amateur Championship qualified him to compete for England at the inaugural World Amateur Snooker Championship in Calcutta that year. He won all four of his matches in the round-robin competition and took the title. He became world amateur champion for a second time in 1966, beating John Spencer in the decisive match.

He became a professional player in 1967, and won the 1968 Willie Smith Trophy, the first tournament that he played in as a professional. He was runner-up to Spencer at the 1969 World Snooker Championship. In 1971 he moved to Australia, and he represented that country at the 1979 World Challenge Cup, which was his last appearance as a professional player in the UK. He died in Brisbane, Australia in July 1995, aged 65, after experiencing long-term emphysema.

== Early life and amateur career ==
Gary Owen was born in Tumble, Carmarthenshire on 5 March 1929. His father was a local champion at snooker, and encouraged his sons to learn the game. Owen played snooker for the junior team at the Welcome Billiards Hall in Llanelly. Three days after his 14th birthday, he won the inaugural British Under-16 snooker championship, defeating Percy Hinton 4–3 in front of an audience of over 1,000. His highest break was 116 before starting his military National Service. He served in the Royal Army Ordnance Corps, including 16 months stationed in Singapore, and played only rarely.

While working as a labourer, he reached the final of the English Amateur Championship in 1950 and was one frame from victory against Alf Nolan at 5–3 before losing the last three frames to finish as runner-up. The next year, he lost 2–5 in the last-16 round to Jim Allen, and in 1952 lost 2–5 in the quarter-finals to Cliff Wilson. In the early 1950s he moved to Great Yarmouth, where his father managed a billiard hall. Owen became a firefighter, and gave up competitive play for a number of years, returning to the game only in the early 1960s. By late 1956, he had moved to Birmingham.

Still working as a firefighter, in 1963 he matched the achievement of his younger brother Marcus in winning the English Amateur Championship. In the final he won nine consecutive frames from 2–3 behind to defeat Ron Gross 11–3. Owen and Gross played a televised challenge match later than year, which Gross won 4–2. Richard Holt of Billiards and Snooker magazine felt that both players were impressive in the televised match, and commented that "Owen was always a joy to watch, with a command of advanced technique and masterful confidence."

Winning the English Amateur Championship qualified Owen to compete for England at the inaugural World Amateur Snooker Championship in Calcutta that year. He won all four of his matches in the round-robin competition and took the title. His attempt to defend his English Amateur Championship title ended in the Southern region quarter-finals, when he lost 0–4 to Jonathan Barron.

He became world amateur champion for a second time in 1966, beating John Spencer in the decisive match. In the 1967 Birthday Honours, Owen was awarded the MBE for services to snooker.

== Professional career and later life ==
In 1967, Spencer, Owen and Ray Reardon become the first players since 1951 to turn professional. Owen was convinced to make the transition by a £250 contract with cue manufacturers Riley Burwat, who were looking for new names to use on their branded cues. As part of the deal, the company handled Owen's bookings. His first tournament as a professional player was the 1968 Willie Smith Trophy, which was a round-robin tournament with Spencer, Jackie Rea, and amateur player John Dunning as the other competitors. Owen won all three of his matches and took the title. He also made the highest break of the tournament, 80, against Dunning in the final frame of the match that confirmed him as the champion. He made a maximum break of 147 in a non-competitive game at the Central Fire Station in Birmingham; although the break was not officially recognised as it did not happen in a public match, he was reportedly only the third British player to achieve the break.

In 1968–69, the World Snooker Championship was held as a knock-out format tournament after being contested on a challenge basis since 1964. In his first match, he eliminated Rea 25–17. In the semi-final he defeated Fred Davis 37–24. In the final, he faced Spencer, who took a 6–2 lead, before Owen levelled the match at 6–6. The Birmingham Daily Post correspondent praised the players for bringing a "refreshing new look to the game, with bold attacking play, wonderful potting, and a sprinkling of good-sized breaks". Spencer was 15–9 ahead after the second day of the final, and maintained a six-frame lead by the end of day three, at 21–15. On day four, Owen won four of the afternoon session's six frames to close to 19–23. In the evening session, Spencer claimed the first three frames, and finished the day six frames ahead again at 27–21. Owen only won three of the twelve frames on the fifth day, leaving Spencer one frame from victory at 36–24. Owen's brother Marcus commented that, "Gary's cueing is all over the place. Every time he plays a forcing shot, his whole body is moving." Spencer took the first frame on the final day to claim victory by achieving a winning score at 37–24. Owen compiled a 100 break, the highest of the match, in the 66th frame during the dead frames after the title had been decided. After the dead frames finished, the score was 46–27 to Spencer.

He was one of the eight competitors in the first series of Pot Black on BBC Television in 1969 and lost to John Pulman in the first round. In 1970, Owen defeated Reardon 6–4 in the final of the Stratford Professional. He was a world championship semi-finalist in 1970, beating Rex Williams 31–11 before being eliminated by Pulman 13–37. In the group stage of the 1971 edition he defeated Paddy Morgan and Norman Squire, but lost to Eddie Charlton and Warren Simpson, and did not progress past that stage. He withdrew from the 1972 World Championship and was replaced in the draw by Charlton.

Owen emigrated to Australia in April 1971, taking a job as the resident professional at the Western Suburbs Leagues Club, a snooker hall in Sydney. He later moved to Canberra, then the Gold Coast, and finally to Brisbane. He was runner-up to Charlton in the 1972 and 1973 editions of the Australian Professional Championship. He won against Simpson in his first match at the 1973 World Championships, but then lost 6–16 to Reardon in the quarter-final. Shortly after the 1973 championship, he compiled his second maximum break, at the Western Suburbs Leagues Club. He played his brother Marcus in his first match in the 1974 World Snooker Championship, and lost 8–15. At the 1975 World Championship, he progressed through two rounds but was beaten 9–19 by Dennis Taylor in the quarter-finals. Taylor defeated him again in 1976, this time 15–9. Snooker historian Clive Everton later wrote that Owen "seemed to have lost all heart for the game" and was a lesser player than in the days when he had been world amateur champion. It was Owen's last appearance at the world championship; although he entered in 1980, he did not play. Having gained Australian citizenship, he represented his new country at the World Challenge Cup in 1979, which was his last appearance as a professional player in the UK.

The World Professional Billiards and Snooker Association, the governing body for professional snooker, first published official world rankings for players on the main tour for the 1976–77 season. Owen was ranked tenth on the 1976–77 ranking list, which was the highest position that he attained in the rankings.

His playing technique included an unusually short backswing. He preferred the use of stun shots rather than follow shot in his break-building. In 1963, he said that he usually practised by playing English billiards, as having only three balls on the table helped him practice his ball control. In the early 1970s, Spencer described Owen as "the best middle pocket potter I've ever seen." Owen died in Brisbane in July 1995, aged 65, after experiencing long-term emphysema.

== Performance and rankings timeline ==
Ranking and results history for Gary Owen
Tournament	1968/ 69	1969/ 70	1970/ 71	1971/ 72	1972/ 73	1973/ 74	1974/ 75	1975/ 76	1976/ 77	1977/ 78	Ref.
Ranking (Note: World Championship results from 1974 onwards counted towards World Rankings.)	No ranking system								10	13	
Willie Smith Trophy	W	Tournament Not Held									
Stratford Professional	Not Held		W	A	A	Tournament Not Held					
Park Drive 2000 (Spring)	Not Held		RR	A	Tournament Not Held						
Pot Black	QF	??	SF	A	A	A	A	A	A	A	
World Masters	Tournament Not Held						RR	NH	??	NH	
World Matchplay Championship	Tournament Not Held								QF	NH	
Australian Professional Championship	A	A	A	SF	F	F	QF	A	SF	??	
World Championship	F	SF	RR	A	QF	2R	QF	1R	A	A	

Performance Table Legend
#R	lost in the early rounds of the tournament (WR = Wildcard round, RR = Round robin)	QF	lost in the quarter-finals	SF	lost in the semi-finals
F	lost in the final	W	won the tournament	A	did not participate in the tournament
??	no reliable source available				

== Career finals ==
=== Non-ranking finals: 5 (2 titles) ===
Legend
†World Championship (0–1)
Other (2–2)

Outcome	No.	Year	Championship	Opponent in the final/runner-up	Score	Ref.
Winner	1.	1968	Willie Smith Trophy	John Dunning (ENG) (Runner-up)	round-robin	
Runner-up	1.	1969	World Snooker Championship†	John Spencer (ENG)	27–46 (Note: Spencer achieved a winning margin at 37–24.)	
Winner	2.	1970	Stratford Professional	Ray Reardon (WAL)	6–4	
Runner-up	2.	1972	Australian Professional Championship	Eddie Charlton (AUS)	10–19	
Runner-up	3.	1973	Australian Professional Championship (2)	Eddie Charlton (AUS)	10–31	

=== Amateur finals: 5 (4 titles) ===
Outcome	No.	Year	Championship	Opponent in the final/Runner-up	Score	Ref.
Winner	1.	1944	Boy's Snooker Championship	Percy Hinton (ENG)	4–3	
Runner-up	1.	1950	English Amateur Championship	Alf Nolan (ENG)	5–6	
Winner	2.	1963	English Amateur Championship	Ron Gross (ENG)	11–3	
Winner	3.	1963	World Amateur Championship	Frank Harris (AUS) (Runner-up)	round-robin	
Winner	4.	1966	World Amateur Championship (2)	John Spencer (ENG) (Runner-up)	round-robin	
