= Warren Simpson =

Australian snooker player (1922–1980)

Personal information
- Born: 28 March 1922 Melbourne, Victoria, Australia
- Died: 28 June 1980 (aged 58) Toowoon Bay, Australia

Sport
- Country: Australia
- Sport: Snooker
- Professional: 1970–1980
- Highest ranking: 20 (1976/1977)
- Best ranking finish: Last 16 (x1)

Warren Alwyn Simpson (28 March 1922 – 28 June 1980) was an Australian snooker player. He was world amateur champion before turning professional in the early 1960s.

== Career ==
Simpson won amateur championships at state and national level before becoming world amateur champion in 1954. He played an exhibition against world professional champion Fred Davis in 1960 and later turned professional. He won the Australian Professional Championship in 1963 and again in 1968; the latter was the only edition from 1965 to 1984 not won by Eddie Charlton.

Simpson reached the final of the 1971 World Snooker Championship, losing 37–29 to John Spencer in a match played in Sydney, Australia in November 1970. He competed in three further World Championships between 1973 and 1975. He lost to Gary Owen 14-16 in the second round in 1973. In 1974, despite suffering from influenza, he discharged himself from hospital to play in his match against Bernard Bennett, but lost 8–2. In 1975 he lost 11-15 to Ray Reardon in the second round.

He suffered from diabetes for many years and died at Toowoon Bay in 1980, aged 58. He was married to Mabs, and had a son, John. His obituary in Snooker Scene said that he was a fast player, and "an easy, natural cueist with a deceptively loose style."

== Snooker performance timeline ==
Tournament	1963/ 64		1964/ 65	1965/ 66	1966/ 67	1967/ 68	1968/ 69	1969/ 70	1970/ 71	1971/ 72	1972/ 73	1973/ 74	1974/ 75	1975/ 76	1976/ 77	1977/ 78	1978/ 79
Australian Professional Championship (Note: Round-robin tournament in the 1964/65, 1965/66 and 1970/71 seasons.)	W	F	3	2	F	F	W	RR	2	F	SF	SF	F	A	SF	SF	RR
World Championship	A		A	A	NH	A	A	A	F	A	2R	1R	2R	A	A	A	A

Performance Table Legend
W	won the tournament	F	lost in the final	SF	lost in the semi–finals
#R	lost in the early rounds of the tournament (RR = Round robin)	N	N = position in round-robin event	A	did not participate in the tournament
NH	event was not held				

== Career titles (13) ==
- New South Wales Snooker Championship: 1952, 1953, 1955, 1956, 1957
- Australia National Snooker Championship: 1953, 1954, 1957
- Australian Professional Championship: 1963, 1968
- Australian Open: 1954, 1957
