= 1985 Scottish Professional Championship =

Scottish Professional Championship
Tournament information
- Dates: 5–10 February 1985
- Venue: Marco's Leisure Centre
- City: Edinburgh
- Country: Scotland
- Format: Non-ranking event

Final
- Champion: Murdo MacLeod
- Runner-up: Eddie Sinclair
- Score: 10–2

The 1985 Scottish Professional Championship was a professional non-ranking snooker tournament, which took place in February 1985 in Edinburgh, Scotland.

Murdo MacLeod won the title by beating Eddie Sinclair 10–2 in the final.

== Main draw ==
Quarter-finals; Best of 11 Frames
Murdo MacLeod	6
Eddie McLaughlin	4
Matt Gibson	6
Ian Black	2
Eddie Sinclair	6
Bert Demarco	3
John Rea	6
Jim Donnelly	2

Semi-finals; Best of 11 Frames
Murdo MacLeod	6
Matt Gibson	4
Eddie Sinclair	6
John Rea	2

Final; Best of 19 Frames
Murdo MacLeod	10
Eddie Sinclair	2
