= 1980–81 snooker season =

Details
- Duration: 18 June 1980 – 16 May 1981
- Tournaments: 18 (1 ranking event)

Triple Crown winners
- UK Championship: (England) Steve Davis
- Masters: (Northern Ireland) Alex Higgins
- World Championship: (England) Steve Davis

The 1980–81 snooker season was a series of snooker tournaments played between 18 June 1980 and 16 May 1981. The following table outlines the results for the ranking and the invitational events.

== New professional players ==
In February 1980, the World Professional Billiards and Snooker Association (WPBSA) accepted the application of Tony Knowles to become a professional from the 1980–81 season, and rejected Eugene Hughes and Ian Williamson. Jimmy White, the 1979 English Amateur Champion, opted to remain as an amateur until after the 1980 World Amateur Championship; he became a professional after winning it in November 1980. Dave Martin won the 1980 Professional Ticket Event. Jim Rempe became a professional in 1980 and played in the 1980 World Challenge Cup but he did not participate in a singles event until the 1985 Matchroom Trophy. Knowles, White, and Martin all made their World Snooker Championship debuts at the 1981 edition.

The new professionals were, therefore:

- Tony Knowles (ENG)
- Jimmy White (ENG)
- Dave Martin (ENG)
- Jim Rempe (USA)

== Calendar ==
Date (Note: Dates use the mm-dd date format.)			Rank	Tournament name	Venue	City	Winner	Runner-up	Score	Reference
06-18	06-20	AUS	NR	Australian Masters	Channel 10 Television Studios	Sydney	(England) John Spencer	(Northern Ireland) Dennis Taylor	(Note: The final was decided on aggregate score over three frames.)	
08–13	08–31	CAN	NR	Canadian Open	Canadian National Exhibition Stadium	Toronto	(Canada) Cliff Thorburn	(Wales) Terry Griffiths	17–10	
10–02	10–12	ENG	NR	Champion of Champions	New London Theatre	London	(Wales) Doug Mountjoy	(England) John Virgo	10–8	
10–18	10–26	ENG	TE	World Challenge Cup	New London Theatre	London	Wales	Canada	8–5	
11–16	11–29	ENG	NR	UK Championship	Guild Hall	Preston	(England) Steve Davis	(Northern Ireland) Alex Higgins	16–6	
12–01	12–02	ENG	NR	The Classic	Blighty's	Farnworth	(England) Steve Davis	(Northern Ireland) Dennis Taylor	4–1	
12–07	12–13	ENG	TQ	Professional Ticket Event	Snooker Centre	Sheffield	(England) Dave Martin	(Republic of Ireland) Eugene Hughes	9–6	
12–28	12–31	ENG	NR	Pot Black (Note: Event was played and recorded in December 1980, but broadcast in the spring of 1981.)	BBC Studios	Birmingham	(Canada) Cliff Thorburn	(Canada) Jim Wych	2–0	
01–27	02–01	ENG	NR	The Masters	Wembley Conference Centre	London	(Northern Ireland) Alex Higgins	(Wales) Terry Griffiths	9–6	
02–05	02–08	WAL	NR	Welsh Professional Championship	Ebbw Vale Leisure Centre	Ebbw Vale	(Wales) Ray Reardon	(Wales) Cliff Wilson	9–6	
02–18	02–21	IRL	NR	Irish Masters	Goff's	Kill	(Wales) Terry Griffiths	(Wales) Ray Reardon	9–7	
02–24	02–25	ENG	NR	Tolly Cobbold Classic	Corn Exchange	Ipswich	(England) Graham Miles	(Canada) Cliff Thorburn	5–1	
03–02	03–08	ENG	NR	Yamaha Organs Trophy	Assembly Rooms	Derby	(England) Steve Davis	(England) David Taylor	9–6	
03–12	03–14	NIR	NR	Irish Professional Championship	Riverside Theatre	Coleraine	(Northern Ireland) Dennis Taylor	(Republic of Ireland) Patsy Fagan	22–21	
03–08	03–15	ENG	NR	English Professional Championship	Haden Hill Leisure Centre	Birmingham	(England) Steve Davis	(England) Tony Meo	9–3	
03-??	03-??	SCO	NR	Scottish Professional Championship	Cumbernauld Theatre	Kildrum	(Scotland) Ian Black	(Scotland) Matt Gibson	11–7	
04–07	04–20	ENG	WR	World Snooker Championship	Crucible Theatre	Sheffield	(England) Steve Davis	(Wales) Doug Mountjoy	18–12	
05–09	05–16	WAL	NR	Pontins Professional	Pontins	Prestatyn	(Wales) Terry Griffiths	(England) Willie Thorne	9–8	

WR = World ranking event
NR = Non-ranking event
TE = Team event
TQ = Tour qualifier

== Official rankings ==
The top 16 of the world rankings.

No.	Ch.	Name
1	Steady	(Wales) Ray Reardon
2	▲	(Canada) Cliff Thorburn
3	Steady	(Australia) Eddie Charlton
4	▲	(Northern Ireland) Alex Higgins
5	▲	(Wales) Terry Griffiths
6	▼	(Northern Ireland) Dennis Taylor
7	Steady	(South Africa) Perrie Mans
8	▼	(England) Fred Davis
9	▲	(England) David Taylor
10	▲	(Canada) Bill Werbeniuk
11	▲	(Canada) Kirk Stevens
12	▼	(England) John Virgo
13	▲	(England) Steve Davis
14	▼	(Wales) Doug Mountjoy
15	▼	(England) John Spencer
16	▼	(England) Graham Miles
