= 1989 Scottish Professional Championship =

Tournament information
- Dates: 1–19 February 1989
- Venue: Marco's Leisure Centre
- City: Edinburgh
- Country: Scotland
- Organisation: WPBSA
- Format: Non-Ranking event
- Total prize fund: £6,000
- Winner's share: £2,000
- Highest break: John Rea (147)

Final
- Champion: John Rea
- Runner-up: Murdo MacLeod
- Score: 9–7

The 1989 Scottish Professional Championship was a professional non-ranking snooker tournament which took place in February 1989 in Edinburgh, Scotland.

The tournament featured eight exclusively Scottish professional players. The quarter-final and semi-final matches were contested over the best of 9 frames, and the final as best of seventeen. Defending champion Stephen Hendry did not enter; his manager Ian Doyle said that this was because Hendry was "in a different class" to the other Scottish professional players.

The 1989 tournament was the last for twenty-two years, before its revival in 2011.

John Rea won the event, beating Murdo MacLeod 9–7 in the final. In his earlier match against Ian Black, Rea compiled a 147 maximum break. It was the first maximum break achieved in a tournament in Scotland, and was also his first competitive century break. The title was the first, and only, of Rea's career.

== Main draw ==
Quarter-finals; Best of 9 frames
Murdo MacLeod	5
Eddie McLaughlin	0
Matt Gibson	5
Eddie Sinclair	4
John Rea	5
Ian Black	3
Jim Donnelly	5
Bert Demarco	1

Semi-finals; Best of 9 frames
Murdo MacLeod	5
Matt Gibson	1
John Rea	5
Jim Donnelly	1

Final; Best of 17 frames
Murdo MacLeod	7
John Rea	9

== Final ==
Final: Best of 17 frames. Marco's Leisure Centre, Edinburgh, Scotland, 19 February 1989.
John Rea	9–7	Murdo MacLeod
19–88(59), 68–41, 74–44, 61–53, 41–69, 28–69(50), 1–73, 73–7, 75(74)–28, 69–21, 18–79, 65–43, 42–73, 59–62(55), 62–31, 71–61
74	Highest break	59
0	Century breaks	0
1	50+ breaks	3

== Century breaks ==
- 147, 142 John Rea
- 109 Ian Black
