= 1982 Scottish Professional Championship =

Scottish Professional Championship
Tournament information
- Dates: 4–7 March 1982
- Venue: Glen Pavilion
- City: Dunfermline
- Country: Scotland
- Format: Non-ranking event
- Total prize fund: £3,100
- Winner's share: £1,000
- Highest break: Ian Black (67)

Final
- Champion: Eddie Sinclair
- Runner-up: Ian Black
- Score: 11–7

The 1982 Tartan Bitter/Daily Record Scottish Professional Championship was a professional non-ranking snooker tournament, which took place between 4 and 7 March 1982 at the Glen Pavilion in Dunfermline, Scotland.

Eddie Sinclair won the title by beating Ian Black 11–7 in the final.

== Main draw ==
Quarter-finals; Best of 11 Frames
Eddie Sinclair	6
John Phillips	3
Matt Gibson	6
Eddie McLaughlin	3
Ian Black	6
Murdo MacLeod	0
Chris Ross	6
Bert Demarco	5

Semi-finals; Best of 11 Frames
Eddie Sinclair	6
Matt Gibson	2
Ian Black	6
Chris Ross	4

Final; Best of 21 Frames
Eddie Sinclair	11
Ian Black	7
