= 1988 Scottish Professional Championship =

Scottish Professional Championship
Tournament information
- Dates: 11–14 February 1988
- Venue: Marco's Leisure Centre
- City: Edinburgh
- Country: Scotland
- Format: Non-ranking event
- Total prize fund: £25,000
- Winner's share: £9,000
- Highest break: Stephen Hendry (106)

Final
- Champion: Stephen Hendry
- Runner-up: Murdo MacLeod
- Score: 10–4

The 1988 Swish Scottish Professional Championship was a professional non-ranking snooker tournament, which took place between 11 and 14 February 1988 at Marco's Leisure Centre in Edinburgh, Scotland.

Stephen Hendry won the title for the third time in a row by beating Murdo MacLeod 10–4 in the final.

== Prize fund ==
The breakdown of prize money for this year is shown below:

- Winner: £9,000
- Runner-up: £4,500
- Semi-final: £2,250
- Quarter-final: £1,250
- Round 1: £750
- Highest break: £1,250
- Total: £25,000

== Qualifying round ==
Bert Demarco 6–0 Eddie McLaughlin

== Main draw ==
Quarter-finals; Best of 11 Frames
Stephen Hendry | 6
Bert Demarco | 0
Matt Gibson | 6
Ian Black | 2
Murdo MacLeod | 6
Jim Donnelly | 5
John Rea | 6
Eddie Sinclair | 5

Semi-finals; Best of 11 Frames
Stephen Hendry | 6
Matt Gibson | 1
Murdo MacLeod | 6
John Rea | 5

Final; Best of 19 Frames
Stephen Hendry | 10
Murdo MacLeod | 4
