= 1986 Scottish Professional Championship =

Scottish Professional Championship
Tournament information
- Dates: 10–16 March 1986
- Venue: Marco's Leisure Centre
- City: Edinburgh
- Country: Scotland
- Format: Non-ranking event
- Total prize fund: £14,000
- Winner's share: £4,000

Final
- Champion: Stephen Hendry
- Runner-up: Matt Gibson
- Score: 10–5

The 1986 Canada Dry Scottish Professional Championship was a professional non-ranking snooker tournament, which took place between 10 and 16 March 1986 at Marco's Leisure Centre in Edinburgh, Scotland.

Stephen Hendry won the title by beating Matt Gibson 10–5 in the final. His first ever in his professional career.

== Qualifying round ==
Stephen Hendry 6–1 Bert Demarco

== Main draw ==
Quarter-finals; Best of 11 Frames
Stephen Hendry	6
Murdo MacLeod	5
Ian Black	6
Eddie McLaughlin	4
Matt Gibson	6
Eddie Sinclair	4
John Rea	6
Jim Donnelly	1

Semi-finals; Best of 11 Frames
Stephen Hendry	6
Ian Black	2
Matt Gibson	6
John Rea	0

Final; Best of 19 Frames
Stephen Hendry	10
Matt Gibson	5
