= Timeline of snooker on UK television =

This is a timeline of the notable events in the televising of snooker in the United Kingdom.

== 1930s ==
- 1937
  - 14 April and 16 April – An exhibition match between Horace Lindrum and Willie Smith is shown on the BBC.

== 1940s ==
- No events.

== 1950s ==
- 1950
  - 8 September – First outside broadcast of snooker: Joe Davis against Walter Lindrum at Leicester Square Hall.
- 1951
  - No events.
- 1952
  - No events.
- 1953
  - 27 March – The BBC shows a 30-minute programme of the final of the World Snooker Championship.
- 1954
  - No events.
- 1955
  - 18 March – The BBC shows a 30-minute programme featuring coverage of the final of the 1955 World Snooker Championship.
- 1956 to 1959
  - No events.

== 1960s ==
- 1960
  - 28 November – One hour of the final of the amateur All-England Pairs Championship is shown live on Midland ITV. Mark Wildman and George Gibson defeated John Price and Cliff Wilson 3-1.
- 1961
  - No events.
- 1962
  - The 1962–63 Television Tournament is shown on ITV.
- 1963
  - No events.
- 1964
  - The 1964 Television Tournament is shown on ITV.
  - There is live coverage of the Northern section of the 1964 English Amateur Championship. John Spencer defeated George Scott.
- 1965
  - The final Television Tournament takes place and again it is covered by ITV.
- 1966
  - No events.
- 1967
  - No events.
- 1968
  - 8 September – The Sunday Times publishes the article "Great TV Snooker Frame-up", exposing the fixing of non-tournament televised matches for "the artificial production of climaxes".
- 1969
  - 23 July – Snooker tournament Pot Black launches on BBC Two. It is used as a way of showcasing colour television which had recently launched on the channel.

== 1970s ==
- 1970
  - No events.
- 1971 and 1972
  - Highlights of the four Park Drive 2000 tournaments are shown on Grandstand
- 1973
  - 21 and 28 April – The BBC covers the World Snooker Championship, albeit in very limited form with coverage restricted to a semi-final (21st) and the final (28th) and is broadcast during the Saturday afternoon Grandstand programme.
  - Highlights of the 1973 Norwich Union Open are shown on an edition of World of Sport.
- 1974
  - 20 and 27 April – The BBC covers the 1974 World Snooker Championship. Coverage is identical to the previous year with brief coverage during Grandstand.
  - 1974 Norwich Union Open highlights are shown on an edition of World of Sport.
- 1975
  - 18 January – The BBC shows recorded coverage of the final frames of the inaugural Masters. It is broadcast during Grandstand one day after the tournament ends.
- 1976
  - The BBC covers the 1976 World Snooker Championship and once again, coverage is broadcast during Grandstand.
- 1977
  - 28–30 April – BBC TV coverage for the first Crucible championship increases slightly but is still limited to highlights of the semi-finals and some coverage of the final on Grandstand and in an additional late night highlights programme.
  - 3 December – The BBC shows coverage of the final of the first UK Championship, on BBC One's Grandstand programme. The BBC has broadcast the event ever since, gradually increasing its coverage over the years.
  - 24 December – ITV's World of Sport shows highlights from the Dry Blackthorn Cup.
- 1978
  - 17–29 April – The BBC shows daily coverage of the World Snooker Championship for the first time. 14 nightly highlights programmes are shown with additional Saturday afternoon coverage on Grandstand.
  - 5 November – ITV shows brief highlights of the first Champion of Champions in World of Sport.
  - 30 November to 2 December – The BBC extends coverage of the UK Championship with 2 late night highlights of the semi-finals before showing the final on Grandstand.
- 1979
  - 16–28 April – TV coverage of the World Championship is extended to include an early-evening "Frame of the Day" programme as well as live coverage of parts of the final.
  - 20–27 October – BBC television shows the inaugural World Cup with daily coverage in the afternoon and evening.

== 1980s ==
- 1980
  - 7–9 February – The BBC extends coverage of the Masters event and airs coverage of two quarter-finals, the semi-finals and the final.
  - 22 April to 5 May – The BBC shows daily live coverage of the World Snooker Championship for the first time.
  - 22–29 November – The BBC shows daily coverage of the second week of the UK Championship for the first time.
- 1981
  - 29 January to 1 February – The BBC adds an extra day of coverage of the Masters with all quarter-finals being shown alongside live and recorded coverage of the final on the day that it is played.
  - 4–7 March – ITV shows coverage of the first Yamaha Organs Trophy, which later became known as the British Open, and would show the tournament until 1993. The coverage had three daily highlights programmes before showing the final on Saturday.
  - 14–20 September – ITV shows another new event, the Jameson International Open, with daily late night highlights lasting the whole week and further coverage at the weekend including the final.
- 1982
  - 11 January – ITV shows the first televised maximum 147 break when Steve Davis achieved it during the Lada Classic.
  - 1–7 March – The International Masters, (previously the Yamaha Organs Trophy), extends to seven days with ITV showing afternoon and evening coverage.
  - 2–10 October – The Jameson International Open extends to eight days with daily coverage also being shown in the afternoon and late at night.
  - 15–19 December – ITV shows the World Doubles Championship. Consequently, both ITV and the BBC are now airing four tournaments per season.
- 1983
  - 10–16 January – The Lada Classic extends to eight days starting on Sunday 9 January. ITV starts coverage the day later.
- 1984
  - 22–29 January – The BBC shows the entire Masters for the first time.
  - late April – For the first time, the BBC shows live all-day coverage of the World Championship on weekdays with daily coverage running on BBC2 from 10.25am, just before the start of play, until the start of regular programmes at just after 5pm. The BBC is able to do this because there is an absence of any other programming on BBC2 during the day at this time.
  - 20–26 October – The BBC shows the renamed Grand Prix for the first time. This was the third edition of the event, and had been renamed from the Professional Players Tournament, and had not received any television coverage.
- 1985
  - 13 January – ITV now ends all their tournaments on Sunday afternoon (until 1989) as opposed to Sunday evenings, starting with the Mercantile Credit Classic.
  - 20–23 March – The BBC extends its TV tournaments to five, with the World Team Cup. The tournament is reduced in length and moves from October to March.
  - 29 April – The 1985 World Snooker Championship final between Steve Davis and Dennis Taylor attracts the largest-ever audience for a BBC Two programme, pulling in 18.5 million viewers at the climax of the match shortly after midnight.
- 1986
  - 17 April – Following the 1986 event, Pot Black is put on hiatus as it is seen as outdated in the world of multiple events being broadcast on both the BBC and ITV.
- 1987
  - No events.
- 1988
  - ITV broadcasts all five editions of the World Matchplay tournament. ITV sees this event as being a replacement for the World Doubles Championship, which it had televised since that tournament began in 1982.
  - 19–27 November – The UK Championship slims down to become a nine-day event and the BBC, for the first time, shows live and recorded coverage from each day.
- 1989
  - No events.

== 1990s ==
- 1990
  - No events.
- 1991
  - 2 September – After five years, Pot Black returns.
- 1992
  - No events.
- 1993
  - 6 March – ITV ends its coverage of snooker after its broadcast of that year's British Open. It had previously shown around four events each year.
  - 20 October – Pot Black's revival ends after three events.
- 1994 to 1998
  - No events.
- 1999
  - ITV makes a brief return to snooker when it televises the Champions Cup and the Nations Cup.

== 2000s ==
- 2000
  - No events.
- 2001
  - 19 August – ITV's return to snooker ends after it shows the 2001 Champions Cup.
- 2002
  - No events.
- 2003
  - Eurosport broadcasts snooker for the first time. The channel goes on to provide extensive coverage of the sport both in the UK and across Europe.
- 2004
  - No events.
- 2005
  - 8 January – Premier League Snooker is relaunched with Sky Sports being the broadcaster of the event, which takes place over a four-month period.
  - 29 October – Pot Black returns as a one-day tournament and is broadcast on the BBC's Grandstand. The event features eight players.
- 2006
  - No events.
- 2007
  - 6 October – Pot Black is held for the final time after three events as a one-day tournament.
- 2008
  - No events.
- 2009
  - No events.

== 2010s ==
- 2010
  - October – ITV returns to the green baize when it broadcasts coverage of a new tournament called Power Snooker. The following year ITV signs a deal to show the next three events.
- 2011
  - 28–30 January – Sky Sports broadcasts live coverage of the first Snooker Shoot Out. Sky shows the event until 2015.
- 2012
  - No events.
- 2013
  - 25 February to 3 March – ITV makes a full return to snooker when it signs a deal to broadcast the World Open. This is the first world ranking event ITV has shown for 20 years. It only shows the event once before it moves to Eurosport.
  - 19–24 November – ITV expands its snooker coverage when it shows the revived Champion of Champions tournament. Coverage of broadcast on ITV4. It continues to show the tournament to this day.
- 2014
  - No events.
- 2015
  - No events.
- 2016
  - 12–14 February – The Snooker Shoot Out transfers to ITV, which shows the next three events.
  - 28 April – Eurosport announces that it will continue to show snooker's biggest tournaments for the next ten years with a new deal running until 2026.
  - Eurosport makes some of its snooker coverage available on free-to-air television when it begins simulcasting coverage on free-to-air channel Quest.
- 2017
  - 8 December – The BBC announces a multi-year extension to its coverage of snooker's ‘’Triple Crown’’ events meaning that the Masters, UK Championship and World Championship will stay on BBC screens until the end of the 2023/24 season.
- 2018
  - No events.
- 2019
  - 21–24 February – The Shoot Out moves to Eurosport and Quest.
  - 19–24 March – ITV televises a new tournament - the Tour Championship. Consequently, ITV now broadcasts four top snooker tournaments each year with current deals running until 2022.

== 2020s ==
- 2020
  - 21–28 July – For the first time, Eurosport broadcasts coverage of qualifying for the World Snooker Championship.
  - 19 August – The BBC broadcasts the World Seniors Snooker Championship for the first time.
  - 13 September – FreeSports begins showing snooker when it begins its coverage of the first-ever ranking edition of the 2020 Championship League. FreeSports also covered the 2021 tournament. Earlier in the year, ITV4 launched the first sporting event after the pandemic caused a total shutdown of sporting events across the world, with this modified version of the Championship League.
- 2021
  - 2 July – ITV Sport acquires the host broadcasting rights to the revived British Open. Eurosport, which had previously broadcast the tournament in the UK, will continue to show the event for European viewers outside of the UK.
- 2022
  - No events.
- 2023
  - No events.
- 2024
  - 8-12 May – Coverage of the World Seniors Snooker Championship moves to Channel 5.
- 2025
  - 19 January – BBC Sport announces that it has extended its broadcast agreement for all Triple Crown events until 2032. The extension ensures the agreement is the longest unbroken sports broadcasting contract anywhere in the world.
  - 28 February – Eurosport closes in the UK and Ireland after 36 years when TNT Sports's incorporates the coverage previously showed on Eurosport. Eurosport had shown snooker extensively since 2003 so coverage of the events that it showed now move behind TNT Sports's paywall.
  - 25 June – ITV ends its contract with World Snooker Tour, having reached a height of showing 5 tournaments per season. The world ranking events they showed will transfer to Channel 5 in 2026.
  - 7 November - Just before the 2025 Champion of Champions begins, Matchroom Sport announces that ITV will continue to be the broadcasting partner of the tournament for three more years.
- 2026
  - 17 February – Channel 5's coverage of snooker expands when it begins to show the Players Championship. Channel 5 will also broadcast the Tour Championship and the British Open.
