= Jackie Rea =

Northern Irish snooker player (1921–2013)

Personal information
- Born: 6 April 1921 Dungannon, County Tyrone, Ireland
- Died: 20 October 2013 (aged 92) Cheadle Hulme, Stockport, England

Sport
- Country: Northern Ireland
- Sport: Snooker
- Professional: 1947–1990
- Highest ranking: 48 (1983–84)

John Joseph Rea (6 April 1921 – 20 October 2013), better known as Jackie Rea was a Northern Irish snooker player. He turned professional in 1947 and was the leading Irish snooker player until the emergence of Alex Higgins and held the Irish Professional Championship almost continuously from 1952 to 1972.

Rea reached the semi-final of the 1952 World Professional Match-play Championship, losing to Fred Davis. At the 1957 World Championships he lost to John Pulman in the final despite being ahead in the early stages. With interest in professional snooker in decline, he was one of four entries for the 1957 tournament.

He won the 1954/1955 News of the World Snooker Tournament, winning all his eight matches and taking the first prize of £500. He continued playing professional snooker until 1990. He was placed 48th in the 1983–84 snooker world rankings, which was the highest ranking he attained after rankings were introduced in 1976. Outside of competition, he was known for his entertaining exhibition matches.

== Early life ==
Rea was born on 6 April 1921, in Dungannon, County Tyrone, and was the only child of Catherine and greyhound track manager Thomas. He began playing snooker at the age of 9 in the billiards room of the pub his father managed in Dungannon, but usually then played in boys' clubs until he was 21, as people under that age were not allowed in public bars. He left school aged 14 and became an apprentice boilermaker. When World War II started, he joined the Navy, where he was promoted to Chief petty officer and was a communications instructor. He was demobbed in 1946, and at the time had not played snooker for over five years.

== Early career (1946‍–‍1967) ==
Rea was runner-up to Jack McNally in the 1946 Northern Ireland Amateur Championship, and defeated Jack Bates to win the title in 1947. He also won the All-Ireland championship in 1947 by defeating C. Downey and turned professional directly afterwards. He moved to England and got a job as a billiard marker at the East India Club in St James's Square. He played Joe Davis in an exhibition match, and Davis encouraged him to compete professionally in England.

In 1952, Bates defeated Rea in a challenge for the Irish Professional title. Bates moved to Scotland that year, and was granted eligibility for the Scottish Professional Championship from 1953. In late 1952, Rea was declared as the Irish Professional Champion. He retained the title in a December 1956 match where he was challenged by Bates, who at the time was the Scottish champion.

Rea first appeared in the World Championship in 1949, when he lost 18–17 to Conrad Stanbury in the second qualifying round. He didn't enter again until 1952, when he eliminated Jim Lees and Kingsley Kennerley before losing 23–38 to Fred Davis in the semi-final. He lost in his first match to John Pulman in the 1953 championship and again in the 1954 championship. The players were level at 24 frames each at the start of the final day of their match in 1954, then Rea won four of the six frames on the final afternoon before Pulman took five of the first six frames in the evening to win 31–29. He lost to Pulman again in 1956, separated by a loss to Fred Davis in a 1955 semi-final after defeating Harry Stokes. By 1957 interest in snooker was ebbing and there just four entries for the World Title. Rea defeated Kennerley 25–12 in the semi-final. He faced Pulman in the best-of-73 frames final, and finished the first day of the match 8–5 ahead. At the end of day two, he led 14–12 in front. Rea increased his advantage to four frames at 18–14 after the third morning session, but Pulman won five of the evening's seven frames, including the last four of the day, to move to one frame behind at 19–20. Pulman took five of the seven frames played on day four and was 24–22 up at the close. Pulman extended his lead to 32–27 on day five. On the concluding day, Pulman won five of the seven frames in the afternoon session to take a winning lead of 37–29. Rea claimed five of the seven frames in the evening session to give a final score of 39–34 to Pulman.

Rea won the qualifying tournament, which included five players, for the 1952/53 News of the World Tournament. In the main event, he finished as runner up. With a variety of starts, Rea won 5 of his 8 matches with a frames tally of 173 won to 123 lost. Rea received a cheque for £300. Rea won the 1954/55 by winning all his eight matches, with a tally of 174 frames won and 122 lost. Only Joe Davis, during the 1953 event, had previously won all of their eight matches. Rea's win earnt him a cheque for £500 and allowed his share of the gate at the Leicester Square Hall venue to rise from 15% to 20%. A variation of snooker called snooker plus which had two additional colours, orange (8 points) and purple (10 points) was devised by Joe Davis and first played at the 1959 News of the World Snooker Plus Tournament. Rea achieved the highest ever break at snooker plus, 156.

The 1964 Conayes Professional Tournament was the first commercially sponsored professional snooker event since 1960; Rea finished last in the four-player event, which was run as a round-robin. The 1968 Willie Smith Trophy was also a four-player round-robin. Rea lost two of his three matches. Due to the decline in the popularity of professional snooker making the world championship tournament unviable, it was not contested again after 1957 until a challenge system was introduced in 1964.

== Later career (1968 to retirement) ==
In the 1968–69 snooker season, the World Snooker Championship was restored to being a knockout competition for the first time since 1957. Rea was one of the eight participants in the 1969 World Championship, losing 25–17 to Gary Owen in the first round. He was also one of the eight players in the first Pot Black series which started in 1969; the programme which played a crucial role in popularizing the game. Rea defeated reigning world champion John Spencer in the final of the four-player 1969 Chester Professional Tournament, achieving a winning margin at 4–2 before Spencer won the dead frame.

In the 1970 World Snooker Championship, Rea faced defending champion Spencer, who achieved a winning lead at 31–15, which he extended to 37–17 as the dead frames were played out. Rea responded by winning all seven of the frames of the last session, making the final score 24–37. Rea prevailed over Spencer at 4–1 in the final of the 1970 Chester Professional Tournament, before Spencer took the two dead frames.

Rea retained the Irish Professional Championship title until he was defeated by Alex Higgins in January 1972, the championship not having been contested for some years. Rea held Higgins to 5–4 after the first session after losing the first four frames, but Higgins pulled away to win 28–12; the last scheduled session was not required and was played as an exhibition match. Rea entered the World Championship for most of the next 20 years, but his appearances became more sporadic from the late 1970s and he did not progress into the main event.

After his 19–11 first round defeat to Higgins in the 1972 World Championship, Rea was required to play in the qualifying competition for the Championship each year. The closest he would come to qualification after this came in 1976 when he defeated Ian Anderson 8–5 and Bernard Bennett 8–5 only to lose in the deciding frame 8–7 to David Taylor in the final qualifying round. In the qualifying round for the 1977 World Championship, Rea looked as if he might cause an upset when he led Doug Mountjoy, at the time Benson and Hedges Masters Champion, 8–6 and 9–8 notwithstanding a break of 135 by Mountjoy in the eighth frame. Despite it being a qualifying match, 400 people watched its conclusion in which Mountjoy finally triumphed 11–9.

In 1979, Rea took part in the first World Challenge Cup, joining Higgins and Dennis Taylor to make up the Northern Ireland team. Rea was only able to win one of the 13 frames he played, and team ended up in third place from six teams. Before going out to play in the 1980 World Championship, Rea declared he would engage his all-out attacking style from the 1950s. Such a tactic overcame [Bennett 9–1 in his first qualifying match, but he lost to Willie Thorne 1–9 for a place in the main draw. He defeated Joe Johnson 2–0 on his way to the quarter finals of the 1982 Bass and Golden Leisure Classic, where he lost to eventual champion Rex Williams. He was placed 48th in the 1983–84 snooker world rankings, which was the highest ranking he attained after rankings were introduced in 1976. In the 1985 Irish Professional Championship, Rea won the last three frames to defeat Jack McLaughlin 6–5. He then faced Dennis Taylor and despite a couple of close frames, lost 0–6.

By the late 1980s, Rea had the second-longest career of the active professionals, behind only Fred Davis. In 1987, Rea was given a special award by the World Professional Billiards and Snooker Association in recognition of his 40 years as a professional; it was the special award since 1984.

In September 1987 Rea defeated Pascal Burke 5–1 and Geoff Foulds 5–4 in the first two qualifying rounds of the Fidelity International Open, but was eliminated 0–5 by John Spencer in the third round. One month later Rea defeated Mike Watterson 9–6 in the first round of the UK Championship and held Bob Chaperon to 7–6 in the following round, before losing 6–9. At the end of the season, his ranking improved from 11th to 99th.

His final appearance in World Championship qualifying came in 1990. He defeated Burke 10–4 in the first qualifying round. In his next match he led Marcel Gauvreau 6–3 at the mid-session, but the match progressed to 9–9. Rea led 71 points to 17 in the deciding frame with only 43 points remaining on the table, but Gauvreau came back to win the deciding frame. After the tournament, Rea was 131st in the ranking list, which meant that he was relegated to being a "non-tournament" professional, meaning that the only ranking tournament he was eligible to enter was the World Championship. He subsequently retired as a professional.

== Influence and reputation ==
Rea was the leading Irish snooker player until the emergence of Higgins. Rea encouraged Higgins to move to England, and Higgins would rate Rea's help so highly that he described him as "a bit of a father figure". Higgins would also later move to Cheadle, close to Rea. Rea recounted that once, after Higgins had insulted Rea's wife Betty, Rea "laid [Higgins] out". Higgins later apologised profusely, and Rea said that they remained strong friends. When Higgins married Lynn Hough in January 1980, Rea was one of six people who held an arch of cues under which the couple walked as they left the Church.

From the mid-1950s and through the 1960s, snooker players had to rely on exhibition bookings for their income. Rea made his exhibitions attractive by using comedy during them; commentator Jack Karnehm described Rea "as much as comedian as a snooker player". John Virgo has acknowledged that his snooker impressions were inspired by Rea, and Dennis Taylor has said that his exhibition match routine was significantly influenced by Rea. In 2024, Snooker Scene editor Marcus Stead recalled Rea as someone whose "sense of fun and overall likeability transferred easily from the exhibition circuit to the TV cameras. The sports statistician and author Ian Morrison felt that the main reason that Rea had not been more successful in tournaments was "his lack of dedication – he always treated the game as fun."

In 1952, Willie Smith wrote that Rea was the best potter that he had played against, apart from Joe Davis. Fred Davis, as well as recognising Rea's appeal as an entertainer, regarded Rea as "a tremendous potter, capable of winning sessions against anyone on his day." However, Davis added that he never envisaged Rea becoming world champion. Derek Clements of The Sunday Times wrote that Rea was "one of the most gifted players to pick up a cue, and believed the game should be fun." Clements described him as "a great storyteller".

In retirement he coached young players at his local club, Hazel Grove Snooker Club. After hearing of Rea's death, Steve Davis described him as "One of the game's great entertainers and a great cueist!"

== Personal life, illness and death ==
Rea married Rosaleen, who died when giving birth to their son in the early 1950s. In 1958, Rea married Betty; they had two children together.

Also in 1958, Rea rescued two people who were stranded on a cliff ledge at risk from the rising tide. Having seen the pair, he drove to a nearby holiday camp where he obtained a tug of war rope which he then used to descend 100 feet (30 m) down the cliff face to rescue them.

He died aged 92, on 20 October 2013, following a lengthy illness. His funeral mass was held at St Ann's Roman Catholic Church in Cheadle Hulme, on 30 October 2013 and a funeral committal took place at Stockport Crematorium.

== Performance and rankings timeline ==
=== Post-war ===
Performance and rankings timeline for Jackie Rea before the 1968–69 snooker season
Tournament	1946/ 47	1947/ 48	1948/ 49	1949/ 50	1950/ 51	1951/ 52	1952/ 53	1953/ 54	1954/ 55	1955/ 56	1956/ 57	1957/ 58	1958/ 59	1959/ 60	1960/ 61	1961/ 62	1962/ 63	1963/ 64	1964/ 65	1965/ 66	1966/ 67	1967/ 68	Ref.
World Championship	A	A	LQ	A	A	Tournament Not Held												A	A	A	A	A	
World Professional Match-play Championship	Tournament Not Held					SF	QF	QF	SF	SF	F	Tournament Not Held											
News of the World Tournament	Tournament Not Held					A	2	4	W	5	3	6	Tournament Not Held										
Conayes Professional Tournament	Tournament Not Held																	4	Tournament Not Held				
Willie Smith Trophy	Tournament Not Held																					3	
Irish Professional Championship	W	No known results					L	No known results			W	No known results											

=== Modern era ===
Performance and rankings timeline for Jackie Rea from the 1968–69 snooker season onwards
Tournament	1968/ 69	1969/ 70	1970/ 71	1971/ 72	1972/ 73	1973/ 74	1974/ 75	1975/ 76	1976/ 77	1977/ 78	1978/ 79	1979/ 80	1980/ 81	1981/ 82	1982/ 83	1983/ 84	1984/ 85	1985/ 86	1986/ 87	1987/ 88	1988/ 89	1989/ 90	Ref.
Ranking	No ranking system								UR	UR	UR	UR	UR	UR	UR	48	61	76	103	111	99	117	
Ranking tournaments
Hong Kong Open	Tournament Not Held											Non-Ranking Event									NH	LQ	
Asian Open	Tournament Not Held																					LQ	
International Open (Note: The event was also called the Goya Matchroom Trophy (1985/1986). It was a non-ranking event before 1982.)	Tournament Not Held													LQ	A	LQ	LQ	LQ	LQ	1R	LQ	LQ	
Grand Prix (Note: The event was also called the Professional Players Tournament (1982/1983–1983/1984).)	Tournament Not Held														2R	A	LQ	LQ	LQ	LQ	LQ	LQ	
Canadian Masters	Tournament Not Held						Non-Ranking Event							Tournament Not Held				Non-Ranking Event			LQ	NH	
Dubai Classic	Tournament Not Held																				NR	LQ	
UK Championship (Note: Non-ranking event before 1984)	Tournament Not Held									1R	1R	1R	WD	A	LQ	LQ	A	WD	LQ	LQ	LQ	LQ	
Classic	Tournament Not Held											Non-Ranking Event				LQ	LQ	LQ	LQ	LQ	LQ	LQ	
British Open (Note: The event was also called the British Gold Cup (1979/1980), Yamaha Organs Trophy (1980/1981) and International Masters (1981/1982–1983/1984). It was a non-ranking event before 1985.)	Tournament Not Held											A	A	A	A	LQ	A	LQ	LQ	LQ	LQ	LQ	
European Open	Tournament Not Held																				LQ	LQ	
World Championship (Note: Non-ranking event before 1974)	QF	QF	A	1R	1R	LQ	A	LQ	LQ	A	LQ	LQ	A	A	A	A	A	A	LQ	LQ	A	LQ	
Non-ranking tournaments
Irish Professional Championship	Tournament Not Held			L	Tournament Not Held					A	A	A	A	A	QF	QF	NH	QF	1R	1R	1R	QF	
Chester Professional Tournament	W	W	Tournament Not Held																				
Men of the Midlands	Not Held			LQ	A	Tournament Not Held																	
Norwich Union Open	Tournament Not Held					1R	A	Tournament Not Held															
Pontins Professional	Tournament Not Held					QF	A	A	A	A	A	A	A	A	A	A	A	A	A	A	A	A	
Bass and Golden Leisure Classic	Tournament Hot Held													QF	Tournament Not Held								

Performance Table Legend
UR	unranked	LQ	lost in the qualifying draw	#R	lost in the early rounds of the tournament (WR = Wildcard round, RR = Round robin)	QF	lost in the quarter-finals
SF	lost in the semi-finals	F	lost in the final	L	lost in a challenge match	W	won the tournament
#	position in a league	A	did not participate in the tournament	WD	withdrew from the tournament		

NH / Not Held	means an event was not held.
NR / Non-Ranking Event	means an event is/was no longer a ranking event.

== Career finals ==
=== Non-ranking titles ===
Professional titles won by, and finals contested by, Jackie Rea
Outcome	No.	Year	Championship	Opponent in the final	Score	Ref.
Runner-up	1.	1952	Irish Professional Championship	Jack Bates (NIR)	unknown	
Winner	1.	1955	News of the World Tournament	Runner-up: Joe Davis (ENG)	N/A	
Winner	2.	1956	Irish Professional Championship	Jack Bates (NIR)	unknown	
Winner	3.	1969	Chester Professional Tournament	John Spencer (ENG)	4–3	
Winner	4.	1970	Chester Professional Tournament	John Spencer (ENG)	4–3	
Runner-up	2.	1972	Irish Professional Championship	Alex Higgins (NIR)	12–28	

=== Amateur finals ===
Amateur finals contested by Jackie Rea
Outcome	No.	Year	Championship	Opponent in the final	Score	Ref.
Runner-up	1.	1946	Northern Ireland Amateur Championship	Jack McNally (NIR)	6–7	
Winner	2.	1947	Northern Ireland Amateur Championship	Jack Bates (NIR)	unknown	
Winner	3.	1947	All-Ireland Snooker Championship	C. Downey (IRE)	4–2	
