= Scottish Professional Championship =

Tournament information
- Venue: Lucky Break Club
- Location: Clydebank
- Country: Scotland
- Established: 1934
- Organisation(s): Scottish Snooker
- Format: Non-ranking event
- Final year: 2011
- Final champion: John Higgins

The Scottish Professional Championship was a professional non-ranking snooker tournament which was open only for Scottish players. The final champion was John Higgins.

== History ==
The Scottish Professional Championship was held in Edinburgh in December 1949. There were four entries. Willie Newman, the holder, beat Bob Martin 6–5 in the first semi-final on 7 December. Harry Stokes beat Eddie Brown 6–5 in the second semi-final on 8 December. In the 21-frame final, played on 9 and 10 December, Stokes led 8–2 after the first day and won 11–4 on the second afternoon.

The Championship was held at the Nile Rooms in Glasgow in February 1951. There were three entries. Harry Stokes beat Bob Martin 6–1 in the semi-final on 6 February. In the 21-frame final, played on 7 and 8 February, Brown led 7–3 after the first day and won 11–9 on the second evening.

The Championship was held in Edinburgh in February 1952. The holder, Eddie Brown, beat Bob Martin 6–1 in the first semi-final on 6 February. Harry Stokes, beat J. Mitchell 6–1 in the second semi-final on 7 February. In the 21-frame final, played on 8 and 9 February, Stokes led 6–4 after the first day and won 11–4 on the second afternoon.

Defending champion Harry Stokes beat Eddie Brown 11–8 in the 21-frame 1953 event held at the Union Club in Glasgow on 20 and 21 March. There were only two entries.

The following year the Championship was held in Edinburgh, with three entrants. Bob Martin was due to play Eddie Brown to decide who would play Harry Stokes in the final, however, Brown scratched due to illness and Martin progressed with a walkover. Harry Stokes led Bob Martin 7–3 after the first day's play in the 21–frame final, and went on to retain his title for the third consecutive year by winning 11–5. Stokes withdrew from the 1955 championship, which was won by Jack Bates. In the absence of any other entrants in 1957, Bates retained the title. In 1959, by which time no futrther editions had been played, Bates successfully applied for reinstatement as an amateur player.

The tournament restarted in 1980. In 1981 six Scottish players turned professional, and the event was held as an eight-man knock-out tournament, with Ian Black defeating Matt Gibson 11–7 in the final. The 1982 event was sponsored by Tartan Bitter and Daily Record. The event had no sponsor in the next year and was not held in 1984.

In 1985 the World Professional Billiards and Snooker Association gave backing to national championships in form of £1,000 per player. However, after 1989 WPBSA withdrew their support and the event was discontinued. After a 22-year hiatus the event returned in 2011, but was not held in the next season.

== Winners ==
Year	Winner	Runner-up	Final score	Season	Ref.
1934	W. Crompton	J. West	6–2		
1940	Harry Stokes	A. Chapman	11–4		
1941	Ben Ellis	John Murray	(Note: Ben Ellis was leading 13–12 with 6 frames remaining in the 31–frame match.)	1940/41	
1946	Bob Martin	James O'Brien	4–2	1945/46	
1946	Bob Martin	Joe Camp	4–0	1946/47	
1947	Bob Martin	Willie Newman	(Note: Bob Martin was leading 3–2 with 6 frames remaining in the 11–frame match.)	1947/48	
1948	Willie Newman	Bob Martin	6–2	1948/49	
1949	Harry Stokes	Willie Newman	11–4	1949/50	
1951	Eddie Brown	Harry Stokes	11–9	1950/51	
1952	Harry Stokes	Eddie Brown	11–4	1951/52	
1953	Harry Stokes	Eddie Brown	11–8	1952/53	
1954	Harry Stokes	Bob Martin	11–5	1953/54	
1955	Jack Bates	Bob Martin	unknown	1954/55	
1957	Jack Bates	uncontested	-	1957/58	
1980	Eddie Sinclair	Chris Ross	11–6	1979/80	
1981	Ian Black	Matt Gibson	11–7	1980/81	
1982	Eddie Sinclair	Ian Black	11–7	1981/82	
1983	Murdo MacLeod	Eddie Sinclair	11–9	1983/84	
1985	Murdo MacLeod	Eddie Sinclair	10–2	1984/85	
1986	Stephen Hendry	Matt Gibson	10–5	1985/86	
1987	Stephen Hendry	Jim Donnelly	10–7	1986/87	
1988	Stephen Hendry	Murdo MacLeod	10–4	1987/88	
1989	John Rea	Murdo MacLeod	9–7	1988/89	
2011	John Higgins	Anthony McGill	6–1	2010/11	

== Player Summary ==
Name	Winner	Runner-up	Finals
Harry Stokes	5	1	6
Bob Martin	3	3	6
Stephen Hendry	3	0	3
Eddie Sinclair	2	2	4
Murdo MacLeod	2	2	4
Jack Bates	2	0	2
Willie Newman	1	2	3
Eddie Brown	1	2	3
Ian Black	1	1	2
W Crompton	1	0	1
Ben Ellis	1	0	1
John Rea	1	0	1
John Higgins	1	0	1
Matt Gibson	0	2	2
J West	0	1	1
A Chapman	0	1	1
John Murray	0	1	1
James O'Brien	0	1	1
Joe Camp	0	1	1
Chris Ross	0	1	1
Jim Donnelly	0	1	1
Anthony McGill	0	1	1
