= 2011 Scottish Professional Championship =

Scottish Professional Championship
Tournament information
- Dates: 11–14 April 2011
- Venue: Lucky Break Snooker Club
- City: Clydebank
- Country: Scotland
- Format: Non-ranking event

Final
- Champion: John Higgins
- Runner-up: Anthony McGill
- Score: 6–1

The 2011 Scottish Professional Championship was a professional non-ranking snooker tournament that took place between 11 and 14 April at the Lucky Break Snooker Club in Clydebank, Scotland. The tournament was last held in 1989, where John Rea defeated Murdo MacLeod 9–7 in the final.

John Higgins won in the final 6–1 against Anthony McGill.

== Main draw ==
Preliminary Round; Best of 9 frames
Jamie Burnett	5
Paul McPhillips	3
Alan McManus	5
Mark Boyle	1
Marcus Campbell	3
James McBain	5
Anthony McGill	5
Richy McDonald	1

Quarter-finals; Best of 9 frames
John Higgins	5
Jamie Burnett	1
Stephen Hendry	5
Alan McManus	2
Graeme Dott	5
James McBain	2
Stephen Maguire	3
Anthony McGill	5

Semi-finals; Best of 9 frames
John Higgins	5
Stephen Hendry	0
Graeme Dott	3
Anthony McGill	5

Final; Best of 11 frames
John Higgins	6
Anthony McGill	1

== Final ==
Final: Best of 11 frames Lucky Break Snooker Club, Clydebank, Scotland, 14 April 2011.
John Higgins	6–1	Anthony McGill
111–6 (106), 81–57, 83–1 (83), 9–70, 82–30 (62), 108–1 (108), 83–26
108	Highest break	40
2	Century breaks	0
4	50+ breaks	0

== Qualifying ==
Best of 9 frames

Round 1		Round 2
Steve Wylie	5
John Rea	1	Steve Wylie	1
Mark Boyle	5	Mark Boyle	5
David McLellan	1

Round 1		Round 2
Scott MacKenzie	5
Craig McGillivary	2	Scott MacKenzie	2
Richy McDonald	5	Richy McDonald	5
Murdo MacLeod	0

Round 1		Round 2
John Lardner	5
Billy Snaddon	4	John Lardner	2
Paul McPhillips	5	Paul McPhillips	5
Giulio Rea	2
