= 1981 Scottish Professional Championship =

Scottish Professional Championship
Tournament information
- Dates: March 1981
- Venue: Cumbernauld Theatre
- City: Kildrum
- Country: Scotland
- Format: Non-ranking event

Final
- Champion: Ian Black
- Runner-up: Matt Gibson
- Score: 11–7

The 1981 Scottish Professional Championship was a professional non-ranking snooker tournament, which took place in March 1981 in Kildrum, Scotland.

Ian Black won the title by beating Matt Gibson 11–7 in the final.

== Main draw ==
Quarter-finals; Best of 9 Frames
Ian Black	5
Murdo MacLeod	4
Eddie McLaughlin	5
Chris Ross	3
Matt Gibson	5
Bert Demarco	3
Jim Donnelly	5
Eddie Sinclair	2

Semi-finals; Best of 11 Frames
Ian Black	6
Eddie McLaughlin	3
Matt Gibson	6
Jim Donnelly	4

Final; Best of 21 Frames
Ian Black	11
Matt Gibson	7
