= 1969–70 snooker season =

Details
- Duration: July 1969 – May 1970
- Tournaments: 5 (non-ranking)

Triple Crown winners
- World Championship: (Wales) Ray Reardon

The 1969–70 snooker season was a series of snooker tournaments played between July 1969 and May 1970. The following table outlines the results for the season's events.

== Calendar ==
Date (Note: Dates use the mm-dd date format.)			Rank	Tournament name	Venue	City	Winner	Runner-up	Score	Reference
07-07	07-22	AUS	NR	Australian Professional Championship	Junior Rugby League Club	Sydney	(Australia) Eddie Charlton	(Australia) Norman Squire	8–3	
07–21	07–23	ENG	NR	Chester Professional Tournament	Upton-By-Chester British Legion	Chester	(Northern Ireland) Jackie Rea	(England) John Spencer	4–3 (Note: Winning margin achieved at 4–2)	
01-??	01-??	ENG	NR	Pot Black	BBC Studios	Birmingham	(England) John Spencer	(Wales) Ray Reardon	1–0	
04–06	04–11	ENG	NR	World Snooker Championship	Victoria Hall	London	(Wales) Ray Reardon	(England) John Pulman	37–33	
04–30	05–02	CAN	NR	Canadian Professional Tournament	North York Centennial Centre	Toronto	(England) Fred Davis	(Canada) Paul Thornley	4–1	
