= Harry Stokes (snooker player) =

Scottish snooker and billiards player

Personal information
- Born: 19 June 1920 Scotland
- Died: 10 April 1987 (aged 66) Scotland

Sport
- Country: Scotland
- Sport: Snooker
- Professional: 1953–1955

Henry Paul Stokes (19 June 1920 – 10 April 1987) was a Scottish professional snooker and billiards player from Glasgow. He was Scottish Professional Snooker Champion in 1949, 1952 and 1953. He remained the Scottish Professional Champion until the event was restarted in 1980.

== Career ==
Stokes won the 1935 Scottish Boys' Billiards Championship, defeating R. Sinclair in the final. In January 1936 Stokes reached the final of the English Boys' Billiards Championship, losing 618–750 to Donald Cruickshank at Burroughes Hall in London. Stokes turned professional soon afterwards; as he was working in a billiards hall, in Glasgow, he automatically became a professional when he turned 16. After turning professional, Stokes was represented by promoter J. G. Williamson, and defeated Alick Taylor in a match in Glasgow despite conceding a start of 1,000 points in a match of 6,000-up. Professional Tom Aiken wrote in 1937 that "it is safe to predict [Stokess] will turn out to be our best professional player."

In January 1938 he lost 6,321–7,000 to Neil Canney in the final of the Scottish (Residential) Professional Billiards Championship In April Stokes lost 5336–7000 to Walter Donaldson in the Open event. In 1939, fellow professional Willie Smith said that Stokes was "one of the most natural players I have seen. His cue action is perfect and he shows great promise." That year, Stokes lost 6,056–7,000 to James McGhie in the Scottish (Residential) professional championship final.

Stokes was Scottish Professional Snooker Champion in 1940, 1949, 1952, 1953 and 1954 and was the losing finalist in 1951. He is still the only player to win the Championship five times. His first Championship win was in Glasgow in February and March 1940, when Stokes beat A.Chapman 11–4 in the final. His next championship win was in Edinburgh in December 1949. There were four entries. Stokes beat Eddie Brown 6–5 in the second semi-final on 8 December. In the 21-frame final, played on 9 and 10 December, Stokes led Willie Newman, the holder, 8–2 after the first day and won 11–4 on the second afternoon.

The next Championship was held at the Nile Rooms in Glasgow in February 1951. There were three entries. Stokes beat Bob Martin 6–1 in the semi-final on 6 February. In the 21-frame final, played on 7 and 8 February, Eddie Brown led 7–3 after the first day and won 11–9 on the second evening. The 1952 Championship was held in Edinburgh in February that year. There were four entries. Stokes, beat J. Mitchell 6–1 in the second semi-final on 7 February. In the 21-frame final, played on 8 and 9 February, Stokes led Eddie Brown 6–4 after the first day and won 11–4 on the second afternoon, to regain the title. Stokes retained his title in 1953 when beat Eddie Brown 11–8 in the 21-frame event held at the Union Club in Glasgow on 20 and 21 March. They were the only two entries.

The following year, 1954, Stokes retained the title again, his third consecutive Championship and fourth overall, after defeating Bob Martin 11–5 in the final held in Edinburgh on 7 and 8 January. With this victory, Stokes became the second player, after Bob Martin to win the title three years in succession, a feat that was subsequently matched by Stephen Hendry in 1988. This was to be the last Scottish Professional Championship until it restarted in 1980.

Stokes rarely entered the major English snooker tournaments but played in the 1954 World Professional Match-play Championship where he lost at the quarter-final stage to Fred Davis. He entered again in 1955 but lost to Jackie Rea. He also entered the 1954/1955 News of the World Snooker Tournament, playing in the qualifying stage in May 1954. Stokes beat Sydney Lee but lost to Kingsley Kennerley and didn't qualify for the main event.
