= 1983 Scottish Professional Championship =

Scottish Professional Championship
Tournament information
- Dates: 26–28 August 1983
- Venue: University of Glasgow
- City: Glasgow
- Country: Scotland
- Format: Non-ranking event
- Total prize fund: £5,000
- Winner's share: £2,000
- Highest break: Murdo MacLeod (106)

Final
- Champion: Murdo MacLeod
- Runner-up: Eddie Sinclair
- Score: 11–9

The 1983 Scottish Professional Championship was a professional non-ranking snooker tournament, which took place between 26 and 28 August 1983 at the University of Glasgow in Glasgow, Scotland.

Murdo MacLeod won the title by beating Eddie Sinclair 11–9 in the final.

== Main draw ==
Quarter-finals; Best of 11 Frames
Murdo MacLeod	6
Matt Gibson	5
Ian Black	6
Eddie McLaughlin	4
Jim Donnelly	6
Bert Demarco	4

Semi-finals; Best of 11 Frames
Murdo MacLeod	6
Ian Black	2
Eddie Sinclair	6
Jim Donnelly	5

Final; Best of 21 Frames
Murdo MacLeod	11
Eddie Sinclair	9
