= 1982 Bass and Golden Leisure Classic =

Invitational professional snooker event, held 29 May 1982

Bass and Golden Leisure Classic
Tournament information
- Dates: 29 May 1982
- Venue: Golden Leisure Snooker Centre
- City: Liverpool
- Country: England
- Organisation: WPBSA
- Format: Non-Ranking event
- Total prize fund: £2,150
- Winner's share: £750
- Highest break: Paul Medati (ENG) (97)

Final
- Champion: (England) Rex Williams
- Runner-up: (England) Ray Edmonds
- Score: 4–1

The 1982 Bass and Golden Leisure Classic was a professional invitational snooker tournament which took place on 29 May 1982. The tournament was open to professional players who were not ranked in the top sixteen. The competition was held at the Golden Leisure Snooker Centre in Liverpool, and was jointly sponsored by Golden Leisure and Bass-Charrington. It featured 22 professional players.

The ten qualifying matches were played under a best-of-three frames format, the last-16, quarter-final and semi-final matches best of five, and the final was best of seven. Rex Williams won the event, beating Ray Edmonds 4–1 in the final. Losing semi-finalists Eugene Hughes and Mike Hallett took part in a playoff match for third place, which Hughes won 2–0, making breaks of 91 and 73.

The event had a total prize fund of £2,150. Williams received £750 as winner, and Edmonds received £400 as runner-up. Hughes received £150, and Hallett got £80. Paul Medati received £100 for compiling the highest break of the event, 97.

== Qualifying ==
Twenty players participated in qualifying for the last-16 stage of the event, to which Williams and Edmonds were already 'seeded'. John Phillips, Jim Donnelly and Tommy Murphy withdrew, so George Scott, Dennis Hughes and Clive Everton received walkovers.

=== Round 1 ===
- (England) Mick Fisher 2–1 (England) Dean Reynolds
- (England) Doug French 2–1 (England) Kingsley Kennerley
- (Republic of Ireland) Eugene Hughes 2–0 (England) Jack Fitzmaurice
- (Scotland) Murdo MacLeod 2–0 (Scotland) Ian Black
- (England) Paul Medati 2–1 (England) Les Dodd
- (Northern Ireland) Jackie Rea 2–0 (England) Joe Johnson
- (England) Mark Wildman 2–1 (Scotland) Eddie McLaughlin

== Main draw ==
Last 16; Best of 5 frames
(England) Ray Edmonds	3
(Wales) Clive Everton	1
(England) Paul Medati	3
(England) Doug French	1
(England) Mike Hallett	3
(England) Dennis Hughes	2
(England) Mark Wildman	3
(Scotland) Eddie Sinclair	2
(Republic of Ireland) Eugene Hughes	3
(England) Mick Fisher	1
(England) Jim Meadowcroft	3
(Scotland) Murdo MacLeod	1
(Northern Ireland) Jackie Rea	w/o
(England) David Greaves	w/d
(England) Rex Williams	3
(England) George Scott	1

Quarter-finals; Best of 5 frames
(England) Ray Edmonds	3
(England) Paul Medati	2
(England) Mike Hallett	3
(England) Mark Wildman	1
(Republic of Ireland) Eugene Hughes	3
(England) Jim Meadowcroft	2
(Northern Ireland) Jackie Rea	0
(England) Rex Williams	3

Semi-finals; Best of 5 frames
(England) Ray Edmonds	3
(England) Mike Hallett	0
(Republic of Ireland) Eugene Hughes	2
(England) Rex Williams	3

Final; Best of 7 frames
(England) Ray Edmonds	1
(England) Rex Williams	4

=== Third-place playoff ===
- (Republic of Ireland) Eugene Hughes 2–0 (England) Mike Hallett

== Final ==
Final: Best of 7 frames. Golden Leisure Snooker Centre, Liverpool, England, June 1982.
Rex Williams; England	4–1	Ray Edmonds; England
