= 1970 Chester Professional Tournament =

Individual snooker tournament

Tournament information
- Dates: 13–15 July 1970
- Venue: Upton-By-Chester British Legion
- City: Chester
- Country: England
- Organisation: Chester & District League
- Format: Non-ranking event

Final
- Champion: Jackie Rea (NIR)
- Runner-up: John Spencer (ENG)
- Score: 4–3

The 1970 Chester Professional Tournament was an invitational non-ranking snooker tournament, which took place from 13 to 15 July 1970 at the Upton-By-Chester British Legion, Chester. Defending champion Jackie Rea won the tournament by defeating John Spencer 4–3 in the final.

The tournament was part of the City of Chester Sports Festival, which had a programme encompassing over twenty different sports. Snooker events were organised by the Chester & District League and were held at the Upton-By-Chester British Legion, with the snooker tournament featuring four players who competed, in a knockout format, from 13 to 15 July 1970.

In the semi-finals, defending champion Rea defeated John Dunning 4–3, and Spencer eliminated Pat Houlihan 5–2 after trailing 0–2. Rea won the first frame of the final, and, after Spencer had equalised at 1–1, moved into a 3–1 lead. In the fifth frame, Spencer missed potting an easy ball, and Rea went on to take the frame and achieve a winning margin in the match at 4–1. The last two frames of the match went to Spencer, who made breaks of 80 and 54, leaving the final score 4–3.

== Results ==
Players in bold denote match winners.

**Semi-finals**; Best of 7 frames
**Jackie Rea (NIR)**	**4**
John Dunning (ENG)	3
**John Spencer (ENG)**	**5**
Pat Houlihan (ENG)	2

**Final**; Best of 7 frames
**Jackie Rea (NIR)**	**4**
John Spencer (ENG)	3

== Final ==
Scores in bold indicate winning frame scores. Breaks over 40 are shown in parentheses.

Final: Best of 7 frames. Upton-By-Chester British Legion, Chester, 15 July 1970
**Jackie Rea** (Northern Ireland)	**4**–3	John Spencer (England)
**61**–49, 49–**61**, **91**–17, **62**–31, **48**–46 (Spencer then won the two "dead" frames)
