= Ben Ellis (footballer) =

Welsh footballer

Personal information
- Full name: Benjamin Ellis
- Date of birth: 11 April 1906
- Place of birth: Aberbargoed, Wales
- Date of death: 11 January 1968 (aged 61)
- Place of death: Motherwell, Scotland
- Height: 5 ft 9 in (1.75 m)
- Position: Left back

Senior career*
Years	Team	Apps	(Gls)
- Bargoed Town
- Tredegar
- Bangor
1930–1943	Motherwell	286	(13)

International career
1931–1936	Wales	6	(0)
1939	Scottish League XI	7	(2)
- * Club domestic league appearances and goals

Ben Ellis (11 April 1906 – 1 January 1968) was a Welsh footballer who played for Bargoed Town, Tredegar, Bangor and Motherwell, as a left back. He also represented Wales and the Scottish League, and was selected for a Scottish Football Association tour of North America in 1939, official eligibility rules not applying.

Ellis signed for Motherwell in 1930 and made 286 Scottish Football League appearances for the club, also appearing in two Scottish Cup finals in 1933 and 1939, both ending in defeat.

An injury sustained while he was working in a local engineering business effectively ended his playing career, but Ellis then worked as a trainer and a coach for Motherwell. He finally left the club in 1955. Away from football, in 1941 he won the Scottish Professional Championship of snooker. In 1990, a street near Fir Park, the home ground of Motherwell, was named after Ellis.
