= 1955 World Professional Match-play Championship =

Snooker tournament, held December 1954 to March 1955

Tournament information
- Dates: 4 November 1954 – 19 March 1955
- Final venue: Tower Circus
- Final city: Blackpool
- Country: England
- Organisation: Professional Billiard Players Association
- Highest break: John Pulman (ENG) (103)

Final
- Champion: Fred Davis (ENG)
- Runner-up: John Pulman (ENG)
- Score: 38–35

Venues

The 1955 World Professional Match-play Championship was a professional snooker tournament, the fourth edition of the World Professional Match-play Championship, held 4 November 1954 to 19 March 1955. The event was held at several venues across the United Kingdom, with the final at the Tower Circus in Blackpool from 14 to 19 March 1955. The entries did not include Walter Donaldson who reached the 1954 final, but chose not to participate at the event.

The defending champion Fred Davis won his seventh World title by taking a winning 37–34 lead over John Pulman in the 73-frame final. The match ended with the score at 38–35 after the dead frames were played out. It was Pulman's first appearance in the final, and he made the highest break of the tournament with two breaks of 103 in the final.

== Overview ==
The World Professional Match-play Championship was created in 1952 as an alternative to the Billiards Association and Control Council (BA&CC) professional World Snooker Championship, which was retrospectively recognised as a world championship. However, founder and 15-time champion Joe Davis of the BA&CC's events did not participate in the Match-play Championships. The defending champion of the event was Davis' brother Fred Davis, who had won the World Snooker Championship as the BA&CC authorised event, and the match-play championship on all three previous occasions. Fred Davis won the 1954 championship defeating Walter Donaldson 45–26 in the final.

=== Format ===
The 1955 World Professional Match-play Championship was held over several months between 4 November 1954 to 19 March 1955. The final was held at Tower Circus in Blackpool from 14 to 19 March 1955. The event had seven participants as the 1954 runner-up Walter Donaldson did not enter, with a player being given a bye to the semi-finals. The defending champion Fred Davis was given a bye. The rounds were played at different locations in the United Kingdom over different match lengths. Matches were played as the best-of-61 frames in the quarter and semi-finals, except for two quarter-final matches played at Leicester Square Hall which were played over 37 frames, and a best-of-73 frames final.

=== Schedule ===
Stage	Match	Dates	Venue, city	Ref.
Quarter-finals	Alec Brown vs John Barrie	4–6 November 1954	Leicester Square Hall, London	
Quarter-finals	John Pulman vs Rex Williams	13–18 December 1954	Leicester Square Hall, London	
Quarter-finals	Jackie Rea vs Harry Stokes	27 December 1954 – 1 January 1955	Edinburgh	
Semi-finals	Fred Davis vs Jackie Rea	17–21 January 1955	RAOB Hall, Belfast	
Semi-finals	John Pulman vs Alec Brown	24–29 January 1955	Jersey	
Final	Fred Davis vs John Pulman	14–19 March 1955	Tower Circus, Blackpool	

== Summary ==
The quarter-final match between Alec Brown and John Barrie doubled as a contest in the 1954/1955 News of the World Snooker Tournament. Despite the News of the World tournament featuring a handicap system, both players were drawn with a level handicap. Brown took an early 7–5 lead, and later won the match 21–16.

John Pulman and Rex Williams met in the second quarter-final match at Leicester Square Hall, London. The venue was being used for the 1954/1955 News of the World Snooker Tournament and the match was reduced to 37 frames with just one session on each day. The match was level at 12–12, however, Pulman won five of the next six to lead 17–13. On the final day, Pulman won five of the seven frames to win 22–15.

Jackie Rea led Harry Stokes 7–3 after the first day of their quarter-final match in Edinburgh, Scotland. Stokes made a Scottish record break of 82 in the last frame of the day. Rea extended his lead to 14–6 on the second day, scoring a break of 102 in frame 15, whilst Stokes made a break of 90, improving on the previous day. Stokes won seven frames on day three before Rea then pulled ahead and won the match 31–19, taking the last frame on the fifth day. Rea eventually won 37–24 after the remaining frames were played.

Defending champion Fred Davis and Jackie Rea met in the first semi-final at the RAOB Hall, Church Street in Belfast, Northern Ireland. Davis took a 9–3 lead on the first day, however, Rea shortened the gap to four frames as Davis only led 26–22 after four days. Davis led 30–24 after the final penultimate session and took a winning lead of 31–24 by taking the first frame in the final session. The match ended 36–25 after the dead frames were played out.

John Pulman met Alec Brown in the second semi-final, played in Jersey in the Channel Islands. They played just one session on the first day, the score being tied at 3–3. There was also just one session on the fourth day, Pulman having taken a 23–13 lead. Pulman won the match 31–17 at the end of day 5, before winning 37–24 after the 13 dead frames that were played on the final day.

The final was a best-of-73 frame match and held at the Tower Circus in Blackpool. Fred Davis took a 10–2 lead after the first day, but John Pulman had slightly the better of the second day and Davis only led 15–9. Davis led 20–16 after day three, 27–21 after day four and 33–27 after day five. Davis won the title with the score at 37–34, with the final score being 38–35 after the remaining frames were played. Pulman made three century breaks in the final, 103 on day 2, another 103 on day 4 and 101 in the last frame. The 103 was the highest break of the event. Part of the final was televised in the UK in a 30-minute programme on 18 March 1955.

== Main draw ==
The tournament featured seven players, those in bold denote match winners.

**Quarter-finals**; 61 frames
**Jackie Rea (NIR)**	**37**
Harry Stokes (SCO)	24
**Alec Brown (ENG)**	**21** (Note: Match was played over 37 frames.)
John Barrie (ENG)	16
**John Pulman (ENG)**	**22**
Rex Williams (ENG)	15

**Semi-finals**; 61 frames
**Fred Davis (ENG)**	**36**
Jackie Rea (NIR)	25
Alec Brown (ENG)	24
**John Pulman (ENG)**	**37**

**Final**; 73 frames
**Fred Davis (ENG)**	**38**
John Pulman (ENG)	35
