= 1980 Professional Ticket Event =

Tournament information
- Dates: 7–13 December 1980
- Venue: Snooker Centre
- City: Sheffield
- Country: England
- Organisation: WPBSA
- Format: Amateur (Tour Qualifier)
- Highest break: 132 (Eugene Hughes)

Final
- Champion: (England) Dave Martin
- Runner-up: (Republic of Ireland) Eugene Hughes
- Score: 9–6

The 1980 Professional Ticket Event was a snooker main tour qualifying event held by the World Professional Billiards and Snooker Association (WPBSA), which took place from 7 to 13 December 1980. The tournament was played at the Snooker Centre in Sheffield, Yorkshire, and featured eight invited amateur players who hoped to qualify to compete on the main tour as professionals for the following season. It was promoted by Mike Watterson on behalf of the WPBSA.

Dave Martin won the tournament, beating Eugene Hughes 9–6 in the final. Hughes recorded the highest break of the event, 132, in the 13th frame of the final.

At the time of the tournament, the WPBSA had a policy that only winners of the World Amateur Snooker Championship, the English Amateur Championship or a Professional Ticket event would be admitted as professional players. This was changed so that "established amateur international snooker players and winners of prestigious amateur titles" would also be considered, and by February 1981, Watterson, Hughes and Paul Medati had all been accepted as professionals, along with Jack Fitzmaurice (who had withdrawn from the Professional Ticket Event because he felt it was an unfair system) and Dessie Sheehan. Billy Kelly and Mick Fisher had applied but were rejected.

== Main draw ==
Results for the tournament are shown below.

Quarter-finals; Best of 17 frames		Semi-finals; Best of 17 frames		Final; Best of 17 frames
(Republic of Ireland) Eugene Hughes	9
(England) Mick Fisher	3	(Republic of Ireland) Eugene Hughes	9
(Republic of Ireland) Billy Kelly	9	(Republic of Ireland) Billy Kelly	2
(England) Vic Harris	8			(Republic of Ireland) Eugene Hughes	6
(England) Ian Williamson	9			(England) Dave Martin	9
(England) Paul Medati	5	(England) Ian Williamson	3
(England) Dave Martin	6 (Note: Martin led Graham 6–2, at which point Graham conceded.)	(England) Dave Martin	9
(England) Tony Graham	2

== Final ==
Final: Best of 17 frames. Snooker Centre, Sheffield, England, 13 December 1980.
Dave Martin; England	9–6	Eugene Hughes (Republic of Ireland) Ireland
13–70(53), 82–15, 85(68)–22, 85–15, 87–33, 76–17, 98(79)–36, 39–87, 51–58, 81–49, 46–78, 21–97(59), 0–133(132), 87–15, 64–44
79	Highest break	132
0	Century breaks	1
2	50+ breaks	3

== Century breaks ==
There were two century breaks at the tournament:

- 132 – Eugene Hughes
- 100 – Billy Kelly
