= World Snooker Tour =

Series of snooker tournaments

- Current season, competition or edition: 2026–27 snooker season
- Sport: Snooker
- Founded: 1997
- Owner: Matchroom Sport (51%)
- CEO: Steve Dawson
- Director: Jason Ferguson
- Country: Worldwide
- Headquarters: Bristol, United Kingdom
- Most titles: Triple Crown wins: (England) Ronnie O'Sullivan (23) (Scotland) Stephen Hendry (18) (England) Steve Davis (15); Ranking title wins: (England) Ronnie O'Sullivan (41) (Scotland) Stephen Hendry (36) (Scotland) John Higgins (33)
- Qualification: Q School; Q Tour
- Broadcasters: See Broadcasters; BBC Sport, 5 (UK); TNT Sports (UK & Ireland); Eurosport (Mainland Europe); CCTV-5 (PRC); Sportcast (Taiwan); Now TV (Hong Kong); True Sports (Thailand); StarHub (Singapore); Astro (Malaysia); TAP (Philippines); Sportstars (Indonesia); Sky Sport (New Zealand)
- Website: wst.tv

The World Snooker Tour (WST) is the main professional snooker tour, consisting of about 128 players competing on a circuit of up to 28 tournaments each season. It is administered by World Snooker Ltd, the commercial arm of professional snooker, first formed in 1982 as the commercial arm of the World Professional Billiards and Snooker Association (WPBSA). It is also the organiser of most of the events throughout the professional circuit, including the prestigious World Snooker Championship.

As more professional tournaments were held outside the British Isles since the 1980s, the "World Snooker" banner was increasingly being used for different tournaments along with the growth of the sport to other countries. The establishment of the World Snooker Association (WSA) in 1997 introduced a unified branding for the professional game, and it was further revised to its current form in 2020.

Since 2010, the principal stakeholder in World Snooker Ltd is Matchroom Sport, which owns 51 percent of the company; WPBSA, the sport's governing body, owns 26 percent. To compete on the World Snooker Tour, players must be WPBSA members.

== Background ==
World Snooker Tour logo (2020-)

World Snooker logo previously used in the 2000s

The current incarnation of the World Snooker Tour was created in the early 1970s when the WPBSA took over the running of the professional game. At the time of the takeover, in 1971, there were only a handful of professional events to play in, but further events were gradually added throughout the 1970s, and by the end of the decade there were over twenty events on the calendar and snooker was a regular televised fixture. This period in the professional game, since 1969, has come to be known as the "modern era"—when the BBC commissioned Pot Black and the modern-day knock-out format for the World Snooker Championship was introduced.

Outside of the British Isles, Commonwealth nations such as Australia, Canada and South Africa were the only major host countries for snooker tournaments before the 1980s; In a bid to boost popularity in snooker globally, the tournament was extended to the Far East with the likes of China and Thailand. It would prove to be a success, and Asian countries have been an integral part of the snooker calendar since.

=== Participation ===
Historically a player just needed to become a professional member of the governing body to participate in events, which was attained by formal invitation by an existing current member, and this system was eventually replaced by the Pro-Ticket series. The game went open for the 1991–92 season, whereby anyone could apply for professional membership and enter the tournaments. Due to over-subscription, a two-tiered tour structure was adopted for the 1997–98 season: the primary tour—officially now known as the World Snooker Tour but previously known (and still commonly referred to) as the Main Tour—with a limited membership, and a secondary tour was established for the rest of the professional membership.

== Structure ==
=== Tournaments ===
The World Snooker Tour consists of ranking tournaments that contribute to a player's ranking, and invitational events that do not. All players on the tour can enter a ranking event, whereas the entry criteria for an invitational event is often set by the sponsor or broadcaster, and usually excludes many players on the tour. The list of ranking tournaments have expanded throughout the years; there are now around 20 ranking tournaments regularly showing up on the snooker calendar each season.

Ranking tournaments are often played in two stages—a qualification stage and the main draw, usually at different locations. The main draw is most likely to be held at a prestigious venue where audiences can purchase a ticket and watch the players compete. Typically only the main draw is televised, and therefore often carries considerably higher prize money than the qualifiers. Some ranking tournaments also feature amateur players as wildcards in qualifiers, usually through nomination from the regional snooker governing bodies. Examples include the English Partnership for Snooker and Billiards (EPSB) nominating wildcard amateurs to compete in the English Open, Welsh Snooker for Welsh Open and the WPBSA for the Shoot Out, UK Championship and World Championship.

The current three of the most long-standing and prestigious events are collectively known as the Triple Crown, which have defined the careers of many professional snooker players. Most tournaments are mainly being held in the home nations, whereas tournaments in mainland Europe, China and the Middle East has also gained traction in the past decades. Notable events include:

Blue-filled: Nations that hosted a World Snooker Tour event in 2023-24

==== The Triple Crown ====
- World Snooker Championship, first held in 1927
- Masters, first held in 1975
- UK Championship, first held in 1977

==== Home Nations Series ====
- English Open
- Welsh Open, first held in 1980 as the Classic
- Scottish Open, first held in 1981 as the International Open
- Northern Ireland Open, first held in 1981 as the Northern Ireland Classic

European events

- German Masters, first held in 1995
- European Masters, first held in 1989, last held in 2023, being played in various European countries such as Austria, Belgium, France, Romania and the Netherlands
- Malta Grand Prix, first held in 1994, last held as the Malta Cup in 2008
- Irish Masters, first held in 1975, last held in 2007

==== Outside Europe ====
- World Open, first held in 1982, better known previously as the Grand Prix
- China Open, first held in 1985
- Australian Goldfields Open, first held in 1979, last held in 2015
- Thailand Masters, first held in 1983, last held in 2006
- Dubai Classic, first held in 1988, and the subsequent Bahrain Championship and Saudi Arabia Masters in the Middle East

Other countries that have organised World Snooker tournaments include Monaco, Gibraltar, Poland, Finland, Bulgaria and Latvia in Europe, Hong Kong, Macau, Japan, Malaysia, Singapore, New Zealand, Turkey, Pakistan and India in Asia and Oceania, and Canada, Brazil and South Africa elsewhere. Some events like the Championship League, Champion of Champions and the defunct Premier League are not directly sanctioned by the Tour but still constitute as a part of the professional snooker calendar due to historical reasons.

The tour also hosts events of alternate forms of snooker, such as the Snooker Shoot Out with the time-constrained shoot-out rules, Six-red World Championship for six-red snooker and the Riyadh Season Championship, as known as the "golden ball" event.

=== Competition format ===
Players traditionally come into ranking events in different rounds based on their world ranking, and the top players in the sport—often the top 16 ranked players—are usually seeded through to the venue stage and do not have to play a qualification match; however, from the 2013–14 season the circuit began to transition to a flat format structure, with all the players starting in the first round. Some tournaments also have an amateur leg that makes it possible for non-members to enter WPBSA events.

Starting from the 2021-22 snooker season, the tour began to transition some of its events back to a seeded format using qualifying rounds. The Home Nations Series was the first set of events to follow this change, where the first round was played as a qualifying round for all non-Top 16 players, with those in the Top 16 — plus local nation wildcards — having their matches held over to the final venue. The UK Championship followed suit from the 2022 edition, which effectively turned the tournament into a near-identical copy of the World Snooker Championship, with the exception being frame length. Lower ranked players are now required to play without crowds and in cubicles for the qualifying rounds in such events.

== Qualification ==
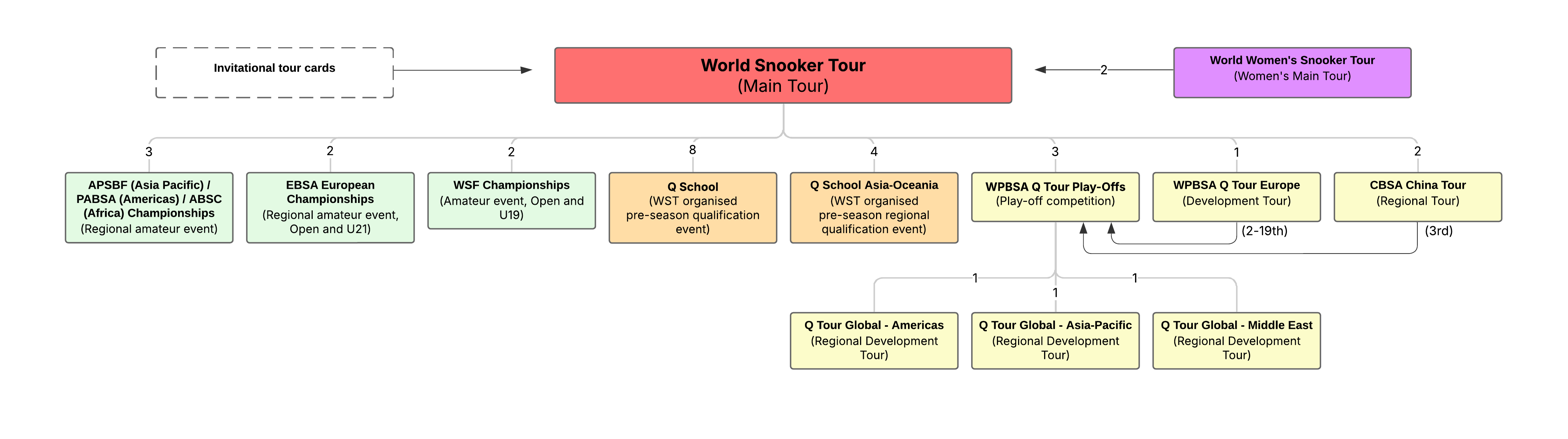
Pathways to enter the main tour; including second-tier tournaments, amateur competitions and pre-season qualification school

To compete as a professional on the World Snooker Tour, a player must qualify for a place on the tour. At the end of each season, a pre-determined number of players (usually outside the top 64) are relegated from the tour based on their performance in ranking tournaments, making way for new professionals to join the tour. Players who retain their place on the tour through their world rankings are only guaranteed a place for one further season.

New professionals join the World Snooker Tour by holding a tour card that guarantees their place on the tour for two consecutive seasons, regardless of ranking. Tour cards can be obtained through various events, such as the tour's own Q School which is held immediately before the start of the new professional season, the second-tier WPBSA Q Tour, and competitions from other affiliated organisations (e.g. the WSF Championship and the EBSA European Championship). A limited number of places are also made available to players at the discretion of the governing body through invitational tour cards, first introduced in 2015.

The main tour now regularly takes on around 128 players, with those outside the top 64 on a two-year tour card from either the previous year or the current year. In the 2024‍–‍25 season, four players were granted a tour card from rankings on the one-year list, seven from winning regional competitions (WSF, EBSA, ABSC, etc.), four from the Q Tour, two from the CBSA China Tour, two from the World Women's Snooker Tour (a qualification route since 2021), 12 from Q School, and one being granted an invitational tour card—making up the 32 places to join the main tour each season.

=== Q Tour ===
Following the tour structure revamp from the 1997‍–‍98 season, the top ranked professionals were qualified automatically for the main tour whilst the rest of the membership had to undergo a series of qualifying events. These were only held once per season, and thereafter the main qualification route was via the secondary professional tour then known as the Challenge Tour. Following its discontinuation, the promotion places were allocated to the International Open Series (PIOS)—an amateur open tour organised by Pontins—for the 2005‍–‍06 season.

The amateur status of the PIOS event meant that players who had been relegated from the main tour and wished to compete on PIOS had to relinquish their professional membership. This was unpopular because players who relinquished their professional membership would be ineligible to enter the World Snooker Championship, previously open to all professional members including those not competing on the main tour. Another issue was that players could not compete on PIOS whilst also competing on the main tour, meaning that they were unable to safeguard their membership on the main tour by immediately re-qualifying via PIOS. This unpopular contest was discontinued after the 2009‍–‍10 season, with a new amateur-only secondary tour being brought back in 2018 whom renamed as the Q Tour in 2021.

=== Q School ===
In contrast to the fully fledged secondary Q Tour, the Q School was established in an attempt to streamline the qualification process for the main tour through its knock-out format, and it has replaced the PIOS since the 2010‍–‍11 season. A series of play-offs are run through to the quarter-final stages only. Players pay a fixed entry fee to enter all the play-off events, and there is no prize money. Each player who wins a quarter-final game qualifies for a two-year tour card on the main tour. All the players that have entered the event compete in the first play-off, and those that are not successful are automatically entered into the next play-off, and so on. Q School is open to everyone; players who have just been relegated from the World Snooker Tour are eligible to enter Q School and, if successful, immediately regain their places on the main tour.

Those who do not manage to qualify for the World Snooker Tour may still be entered into professional tournaments using the Q School top-up list, known as the Order of Merit. This list ranks the amateur players by their performance during the play-offs: should a tournament not consist of 128 World Snooker Tour players for any reason (such as the tournaments that ran through the 2020‍–‍21 season because of the COVID-19 pandemic), the highest ranked players on the top-up list are invited to play in professional tournaments as amateurs. For this reason, players are encouraged to perform well, because they may still feature in World Snooker Tour events and thus have television exposure if they were to reach the televised stages of an event they have entered.

== Business ==
=== Broadcasters ===
Domestically in the UK, the BBC has long been the broadcasting partner of the World Snooker Tour with the Triple Crown events' television coverage produced by them since the 1970s. BBC currently holds the right to broadcast the Triple Crown events until 2032.

European terrestrial TV rights to broadcast World Snooker Tour events were picked up by Eurosport in 2003 and has since been broadcasting in multiple languages across Europe. In China, the majority of snooker tournaments are broadcast on CCTV-5, the state-owned television network. Other former and current broadcasters for specific tournaments include the ITV, DAZN, Sky Sports and Viaplay.

==== WST Play ====
In late 2024, the original on-demand streaming platform used for those countries without a local broadcaster, matchroom.live, was shut down and divested into two separate operations. While matchroom.live remains in a new format for those events wholly operated by Matchroom Sport — mainly their nineball pool series — the World Snooker Tour gained its own in-house on-demand and live stream platform called WST Play, which launched just before the start of the Masters in 2025.

The platform works in much the same way as the original Matchroom Live service, in that it offers live broadcasts of events with no local broadcaster and extensive on-demand catalogue of previous matches, except only snooker content remains rather than mixtures of sports content owned by Matchroom. Two membership subscriptions are available: a monthly subscription for £5, or a yearly subscription at £50. The yearly subscription includes priority access to ticket sales for high-profile events, 20% off hospitality at selected tournaments and free daily access to qualifying rounds that are open to fans. World Snooker Tour have also stated that the income generated from the WST Play subscriptions will be used to expand the on-demand archive of matches across the several decades of televised snooker, and that any match which is archived on their platform will be available forever in a digitised format.

=== Sponsorship ===
Once dependent on sponsorships from tobacco companies, the legislation to ban tobacco advertising in 2003 means the Tour had to attract other sponsors to sustain the development of the game. Betting sponsors have rose to prominence to take up title sponsorship for major events such as the World Championship from 2006 to 2022. A multi-year deal for the British motor dealer Cazoo in the early 2020s as the title sponsor of the Triple Crown, Players Series, Champion of Champions and the British Open signals a gradual shift away from betting sponsors in the tour.

Current major tournament / series naming rights
Tournament	Sponsor
World Championship	Halo Service Solutions
Masters	Johnstone's Paint
UK Championship	Vacant
Home Nations Series	BetVictor
Players Series	Vacant

=== Video games ===
The official licensed World Snooker Tour video game, Snooker 19, was published in 2019 with all officially licensed tournaments from the 2018–19 snooker season.

== Awards ==
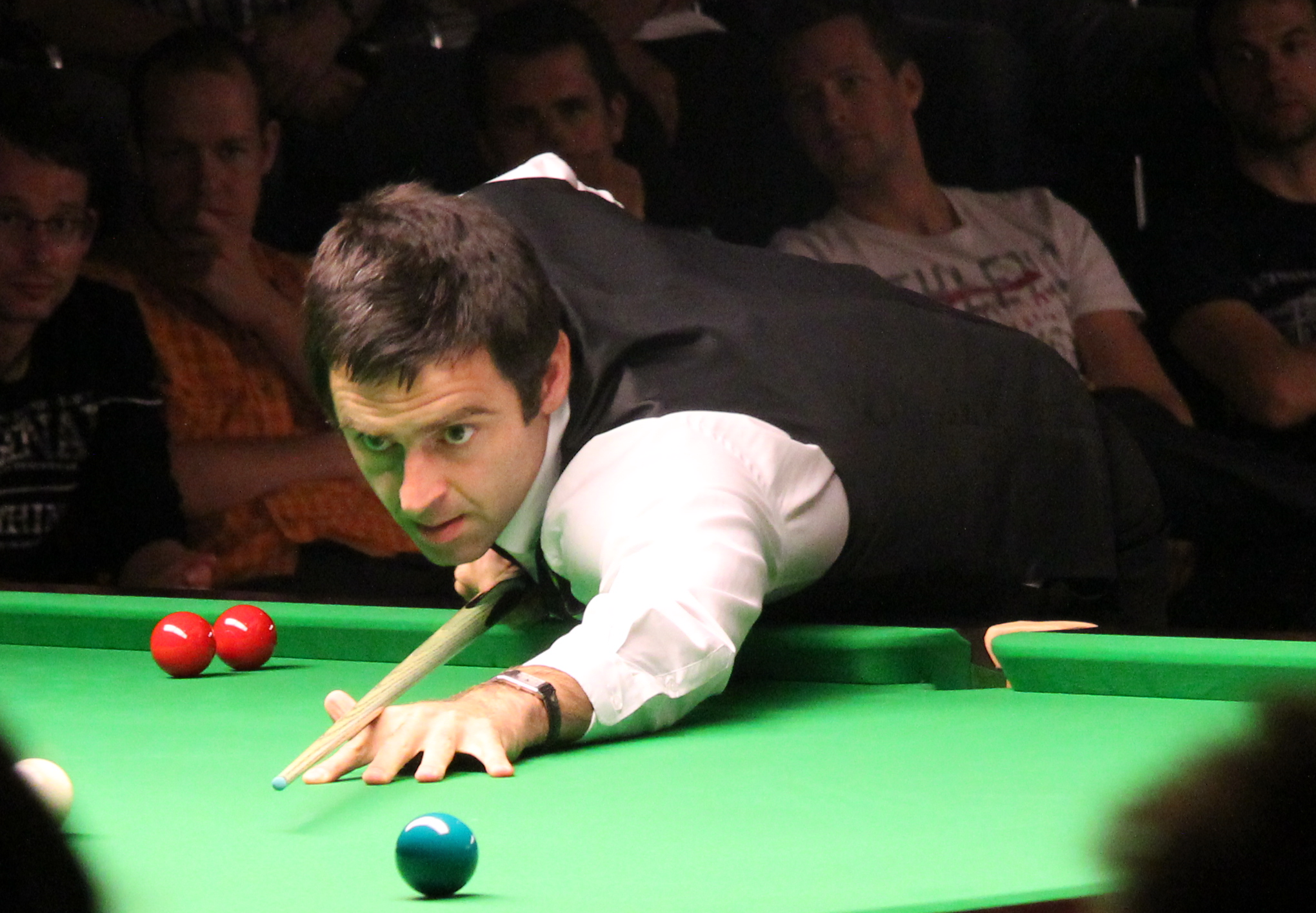
Ronnie O'Sullivan is the latest player to win all three Player of the Year titles in the same season, achieving the feat in 2024

At the end of each snooker season, the World Snooker Tour publishes a list of Player of the Year awards as a commendation to the performances of snooker players during the season. It was originally created by the Association of Snooker Writers, a group of journalists who wrote about snooker, and was held for the first time in 1983. After the takeover by World Snooker Tour in 2011, the scope of the award was further expanded; there is now three different Player of the Year titles to be awarded, each decided by the Tour itself, the Snooker Journalists' Association, and the fans through an online public voting process. The Hall of Fame is also introduced, with eight winners of multiple World Championships as the initial inductees.

List of World Snooker Tour Player of the Year winners (2011–present)
Name	Nationality	Total	Seasons	Inducted to Hall of Fame
Judd Trump	England	4	2019, 2020, 2021, 2025	2021
Ronnie O'Sullivan	England	3	2012, 2014, 2024	2012
Mark Selby	England	2	2013, 2017	2015
John Higgins	Scotland	2	2011, 2016	2012
Zhao Xintong	China	1	2026	2026
Mark Allen	Northern Ireland	1	2023	2026
Neil Robertson	Australia	1	2022	2013
Mark Williams	Wales	1	2018	2012
Stuart Bingham	England	1	2015	2016

Active players are shown in bold.

== See also ==
- List of snooker players by number of ranking titles

== Bibliography ==
- Hayton, Eric (2004). The CueSport Book of Professional Snooker. Suffolk: Rose Villa Publications. ISBN 978-0-9548549-0-4.
- Morrison, Ian (1987). The Hamlyn Encyclopedia of Snooker (Revised ed.). Twickenham: Hamlyn Publishing Group. ISBN 978-0-600-55604-6.
