= 1965 Television Tournament (snooker) =

BA&CC Television Tournament
Tournament information
- Venue: National Liberal Club
- Country: United Kingdom
- Organisation: Billiards Association & Control Council
- Format: Single elimination

Final
- Champion: Pat Houlihan (ENG)
- Runner-up: Eric Stickler (ENG)
- Score: 4–1

The 1965 Television Tournament was an invitational amateur snooker tournament. Apart from one of the semi-finals, it was held at the National Liberal Club in London, UK, as a series of matches starting on 5 December 1963 and with the final held on 3 April 1965. The competition was organised by the Billiards Association & Control Council and shown on ITV in the United Kingdom.

Jonathan Barron had won the invitational pro-am 1962–63 Television Tournament by defeating 4–3 Ron Gross 4–3 in the final, and also its successor, the 1964 Television Tournament, that time with a 4–3 defeat of Mario Berni in the final. Barron was not among the eight participants in 1965.

The 1965 final was played on 3 April at the National Liberal Club, between Pat Houlihan and Eric Stickler. Houlihan won 4–1 to take the title.

== Summary ==
The first round and semi-finals were played as best-of-five frames matches. The first match, on 5 December 1964, saw Houlihan eliminate John Spencer 4–2; it was the first time that either player had been in a televised match. The highest break of the encounter was Spencer's 60 in the fifth frame. Berni defeated Dennis Robertson 4–1, and made the match's highest break on 66 in frame three; television commentary was provided by Ted Lowe. In the first frame of his contest against Mark Wildman, Marcus Chapman made the match's highest break, 35, but he lost 4–1 overall. Eric Stickler eliminated Ron Gross.

Rusholme Conservative Club, Manchester was the venue for the semi-final between Houlihan and Berni on 13 February; it was the only match in the tournament not played at the National Liberal Club. Houlihan won 4–0. The match referee, Fred Mayall, commented that he thought Berni was "under his usual form". Billiards Association & Control Council Chairman Harold Philips agreed, but felt that Houlihan was "playing better than ever before". In the other semi-final, Stickler defeated Wildman 4–1.

Just over two weeks before the Television Tournament final, Houlihan had won the English Amateur Championship, after an 11–3 victory against Spencer in the final. In many British newspapers, this received more coverage than the professional World Snooker Championship title match between John Pulman and Fred Davis held at the same time. Houlihan won the Television title by defeating Stickler 4–1 in the final. It was his 17th consecutive competitive match win, in a sequence dating back to 1964.

== Draw ==
Quarter-finals; Best of 7 frames
John Spencer (ENG)	2
Pat Houlihan (ENG)	4
Mario Berni (WAL)	4
Dennis Robertson (ENG)	1
Mark Wildman (ENG)	4
Marcus Chapman (ENG)	1
Eric Stickler (ENG)	4
Ron Gross (ENG)	(Note: Score unknown)

Semi-finals; Best of 7 frames
Pat Houlihan (ENG)	4
Mario Berni (WAL)	0
Mark Wildman (ENG)	1
Eric Stickler (ENG)	4

Final; Best of 7 frames
Pat Houlihan (ENG)	4
Eric Stickler (ENG)	1
