= Anthony McGill =

Scottish snooker player (born 1991)

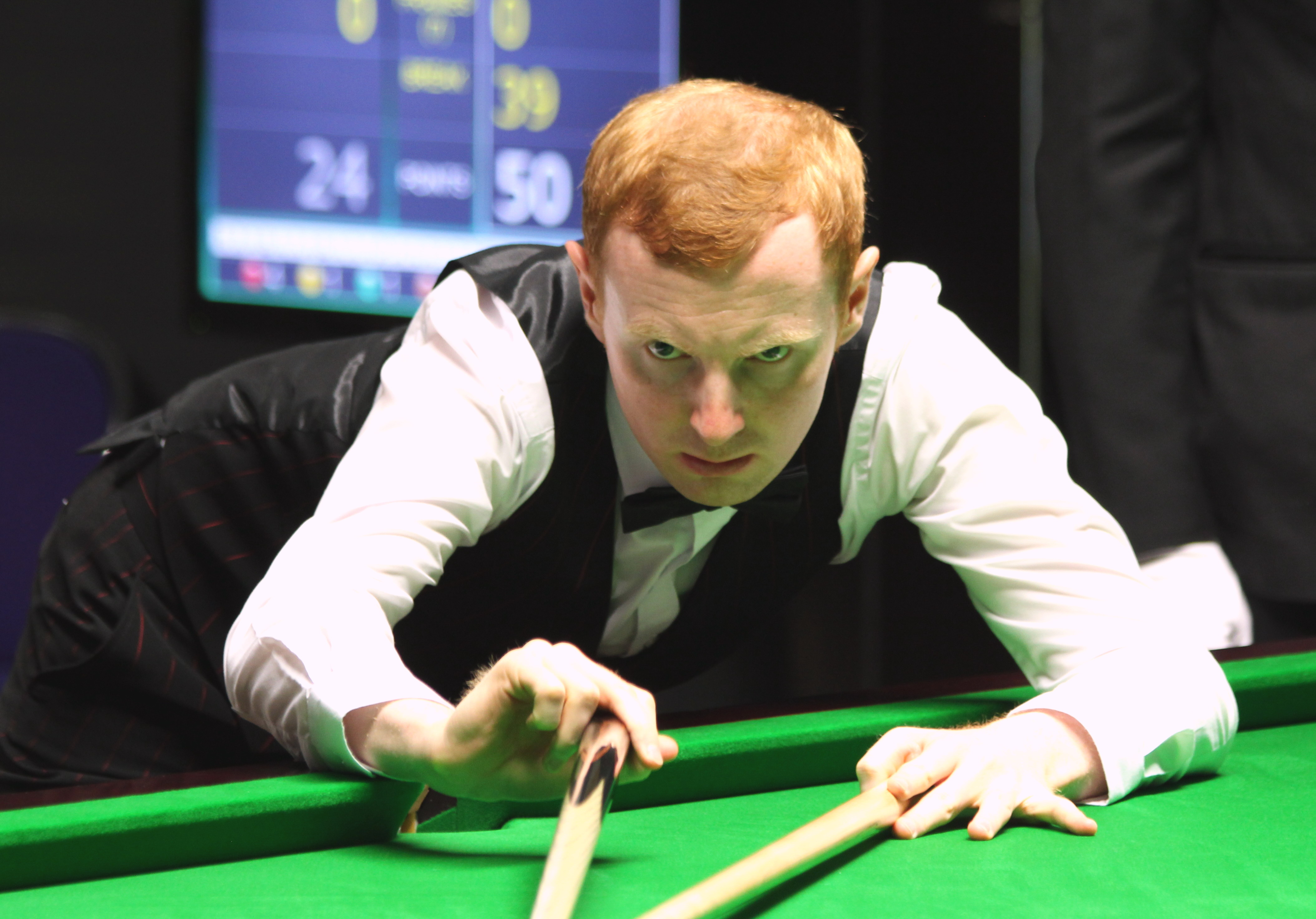
- McGill at the 2016 Paul Hunter Classic

Personal information
- Nickname: The Glaswegian Gladiator
- Born: 5 February 1991 (age 35) Glasgow, Scotland

Sport
- Country: Scotland
- Sport: Snooker
- Professional: 2010–present
- Highest ranking: 12 (March 2022)
- Current ranking: 37 (as of 7 November 2026)
- Century breaks: 265 (as of 19 November 2026)

Tournament wins
- Ranking: 2

Anthony McGill (born 5 February 1991) is a Scottish professional snooker player. He is a practice partner of retired snooker player Alan McManus.

McGill turned professional in 2010, after finishing fourth in the 2009/2010 PIOS rankings. He won the 2016 Indian Open, after having previously never been beyond the quarter-final stage of a ranking event.

== Career ==
=== Amateur years ===
He was runner-up to Stuart Carrington in the 2006 Junior Pot Black.

He was runner-up in the 2008 European Under-19's Championship behind Stephen Craigie.

In the 2009/2010 season, he won the fifth event of the International Open Series and finished fourth in the rankings. Thus, McGill received a place on the professional main tour for 2010/2011. He reached his first professional final, losing 1–6 to John Higgins in the 2011 Scottish Professional Championship.

=== 2011/2012 ===
McGill did not manage to qualify for the main stage of any ranking event tournaments during the season, reaching the final qualifying on one occasion in an attempt to reach the German Masters. He reached the semi-finals of Event 3 in the minor-ranking Players Tour Championship series, which included wins over experienced campaigners Matthew Stevens and Stephen Lee, before losing 0–4 to Ben Woollaston. McGill's season concluded with an 8–10 defeat to Anthony Hamilton in the penultimate qualifying round for the World Championship, finishing the season ranked world number 50.

=== 2012/2013 ===
McGill could only qualify for the China Open during the 2012/2013 season. He beat David Grace, Yu Delu and Martin Gould to reach the venue in Beijing, where he defeated Heydari Nezhad Ehsan 5–3 in the wild-card round. He faced Mark Allen in the last 32 and lost 1–5. McGill had a very good season in the Players Tour Championship events by reaching his first ever minor-ranking final in the European Tour Event 5, played in his homeland of Scotland. He saw off the likes of Mark Davis and Robert Milkins to make it through to the quarter-finals where he was 0–3 and 51 points down against Thanawat Thirapongpaiboon to triumph 4–3. He was also 1–3 down in the semis to Andrew Higginson, but recovered to win on a respotted black. McGill played Ding Junhui in the final and came up short of winning the title as he lost 2–4. The run helped him to 16th on the PTC Order of Merit to qualify for the Finals, where he beat Milkins 4–2 before once again losing to Ding, this time by a 3–4 scoreline. In the third round of World Championship Qualifying McGill fought back from 3–8 down against Rod Lawler to force a decider which Lawler won. McGill ended the season at number 48 in the rankings, at that point his highest position.

=== 2013/2014 ===
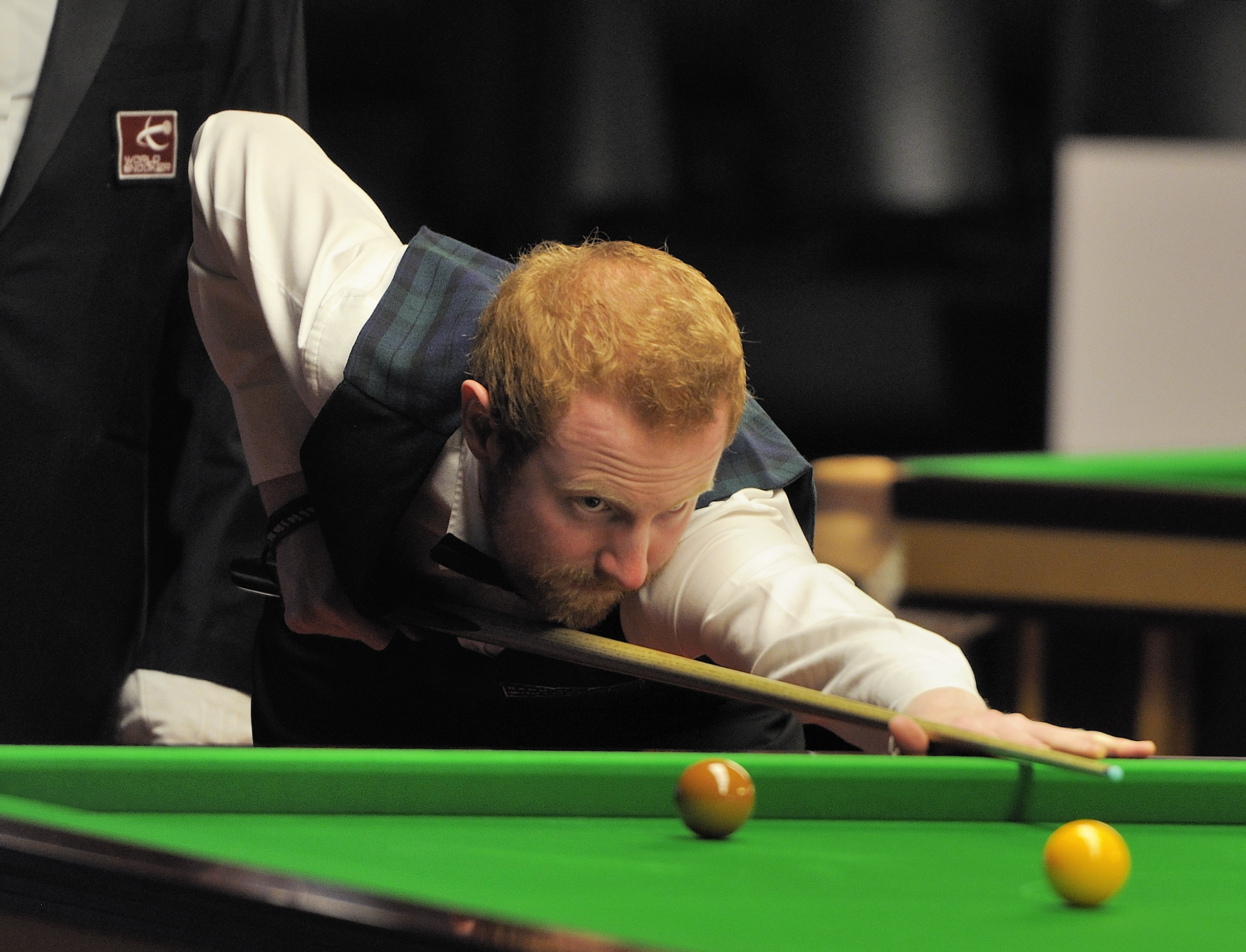
Anthony McGill at the 2014 German Masters

McGill lost in qualifying for the first three events of the season, but at the Indian Open he reached the quarter-finals of a ranking tournament for the first time. He faced Robbie Williams and was whitewashed 4–0. At the minor-ranking Zhengzhou Open, he let a 2–0 lead slip in the semi-finals against Liang Wenbo to lose 4–3. McGill was beaten in the last 32 of ranking events on three further occasions during the season.

=== 2014/2015 ===
McGill began the season with a 5–3 loss to John Higgins in the first round of the Wuxi Classic. He reached the semi-finals of the Riga Open after beating Judd Trump 4–3, but lost in another final frame decider against Mark Allen. McGill eliminated both Michael Georgiou and Igor Figueiredo by 6–4 scorelines at the UK Championship and then came back from 4–1 down against Nigel Bond to triumph 6–5. He reached his first UK quarter-final by holding on to beat John Higgins 6–5 after being 4–1 up, but attributed the win to Higgins' bad form rather than his own good play. McGill then lost 6–4 to Ronnie O'Sullivan after being 2–0 ahead and admitted he had blown his opportunity to knock out the four-time UK champion after failing to capitalise on the many chances that came his way during the game. However, he did break into the top 32 in the rankings for the first time after the event. McGill finished 21st on the European Order of Merit to play in the Grand Final and overcame Peter Ebdon 4–1 in the first round, before losing 4–3 to Joe Perry.

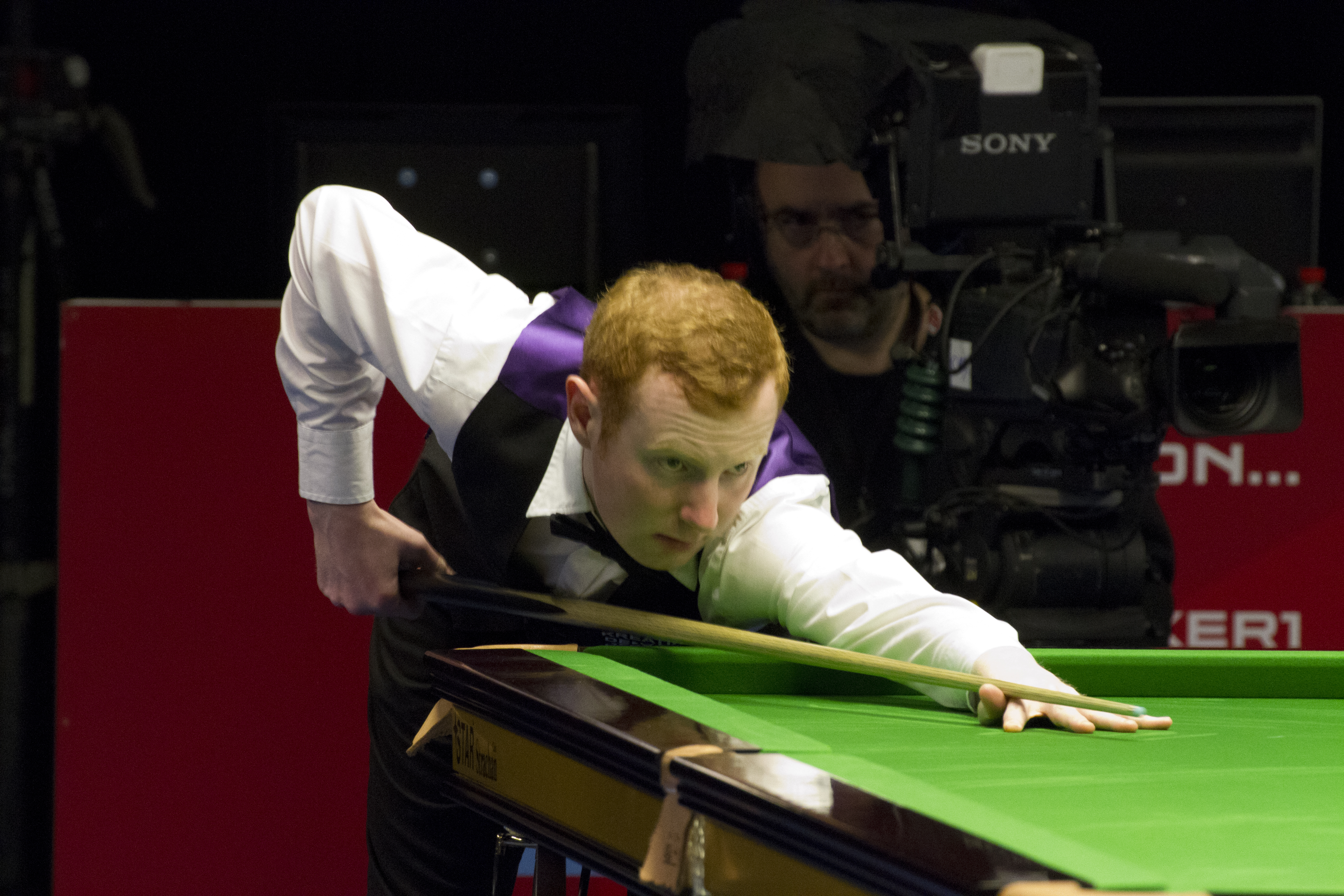
Anthony McGill at the 2015 German Masters

McGill finished the year by qualifying for the televised stages of the World Championship for the first time, after coming through three matches, ending with a 10–9 victory over Mark King which he closed with a 127 break. Compatriot Stephen Maguire levelled their first round match at 9–9 after having been 9–5 behind, but McGill once again made a century break in the deciding frame, this time a 122. McGill then knocked out defending champion Mark Selby 13–9 in the second round, with Selby stating that he believed McGill could win the title if he could maintain his form. In the third ranking event quarter-final of his career, McGill lost 13–8 to Shaun Murphy. The crowd warmed to McGill during his run in the tournament due to him smiling frequently between shots and displaying a relaxed attitude. He was the world number 24 afterwards, resulting in a climb of 21 places in 12 months.

=== 2015/2016 ===
The first ranking event McGill qualified for this season was the International Championship and he thrashed Sean O'Sullivan 6–0, before losing 6–1 to Mark Selby. He exited in the second round of the UK Championship 6–4 to Luca Brecel and reached the last 32 stage of a ranking event for just the second time this season at the Welsh Open with wins over Liam Highfield and Thepchaiya Un-Nooh, but lost 4–2 to Neil Robertson. McGill overcame Hatem Yassen 10–1, Craig Steadman 10–9 and Thepchaiya Un-Nooh 10–7 to qualify for the World Championship for the second year in a row. In a rematch of last year's quarter-final, McGill met Shaun Murphy and came back from 6–4 to win 10–8.> However, after he lost 13–9 to Marco Fu in the second round, McGill described his play as rubbish.

=== 2016/2017 ===
McGill advanced to the quarter-finals of the 2016 Riga Masters, but was thrashed 5–0 by Michael Holt. Another quarter-final followed at the Indian Open by whitewashing Stuart Bingham 4–0 and he followed that up by eliminating Stephen Maguire 4–1 and Shaun Murphy 4–2, after trailing 2–0. McGill played Kyren Wilson in the final, the first to feature two players under 25 in five years, and they went into the interval at 2–2. After the break, McGill took three successive frames to seal his first ranking event title with a 5–2 victory. Three comfortable wins saw him advance to the quarter-finals of the World Open, where he lost 5–2 to Thepchaiya Un-Nooh. McGill's fourth quarter-final of the season arrived at the European Masters and he was ousted 4–2 by Neil Robertson.

This was the first season where the Shoot-Out, the tournament where every match is settled by a 10-minute frame played under a shot clock, had its status upgraded to a ranking event. McGill progressed through to the final and beat Xiao Guodong by 67–19 points to claim his second ranking event title. Afterwards McGill stated that there was "no way on God's earth" that the tournament should be a ranking event due to the conditions it's played under. He was a seeded player in the World Championship for the first time, but from 2–2 with Stephen Maguire in the first round he conceded 447 points without reply and McGill went on to be defeated 10–2. He just fell short of ending a season inside the top 16 for the first time as he was 17th.

=== 2017/2018 ===
McGill reached the final of the Indian Open again but was unable to defend his title, losing 5–1 to John Higgins. McGill was beaten in the first round of the 2018 Dafabet Masters, losing 6–4 to John Higgins. This marked his first appearance at the tournament. McGill lost to Mark Davis in the first round of the Snooker Shootout 2018. Davis scored a century break (102) to knock McGill, defending champion out of the tournament.

=== 2018/2019 ===
McGill's form slipped this season and saw his world ranking dropped from 14th to 23rd by the end of the season. He was unable to advance past the third round in all the tournaments.

=== 2020/Present ===
McGill beat Jack Lisowski 10–9 in the first round of the 2020 World Championship. McGill then won two more matches to reach the semi-final where he played Kyren Wilson. With the match level at 16 frames apiece, McGill conceded 35 points in fouls in the deciding frame (which finished 83‍–‍103) to lose the match 16–17.

At the 2021 World Championship, McGill beat O'Sullivan 13–12 in the last 16 before losing 12–13 in the quarter-final to Bingham.

McGill reached the last 16 of the 2022 World Championship where he was defeated 11–13 by Trump.

After beating Trump 10–6 in the first round of the 2023 World Championship, McGill went on to reach the quarter-final where he was beaten 12–13 by Si Jiahui.

McGill failed to qualify for the 2024 World Championship after losing in qualifying to He Guoqiang. It was the first time that he had failed to qualify for the Crucible in ten years.

McGill reached the final of the 2025 British Open where he was defeated 7–10 by Shaun Murphy.

== Performance and rankings timeline ==
| Tournament | 2010/ 11 | 2011/ 12 | 2012/ 13 | 2013/ 14 | 2014/ 15 | 2015/ 16 | 2016/ 17 | 2017/ 18 | 2018/ 19 | 2019/ 20 | | 2020/ 21 | 2021/ 22 | 2022/ 23 | 2023/ 24 | 2024/ 25 | 2025/ 26 | 2026/ 27 |
|---|---|---|---|---|---|---|---|---|---|---|---|---|---|---|---|---|---|---|
| Ranking (Note: It shows the ranking at the beginning of the season) | (Note: New players on the Main Tour don't have a ranking) | 59 | 50 | 48 | 45 | 24 | 28 | 17 | 14 | 23 | | 22 | 16 | 16 | 18 | 32 | 59 | 38 |
Ranking tournaments
| Championship League | Non-Ranking Event | | | | | | | | | | | RR | RR | A | A | A | A | WD |
| China Open | LQ | LQ | 1R | 1R | 2R | 1R | 1R | 1R | 3R | Tournament Not Held | | | | | | | | 1R |
| Wuhan Open | Tournament Not Held | | | | | | | | | | | | | | LQ | 2R | LQ | LQ |
| British Open | Tournament Not Held | | | | | | | | | | | | 1R | 1R | LQ | LQ | F | 1R |
| English Open | Tournament Not Held | | | | | | 2R | SF | 3R | 1R | | 4R | 2R | 2R | 1R | 2R | 1R | 3R |
| Shenzhen Open (Note: The event was called the Xi'an Grand Prix (2024/2025–2025/2026)) | Tournament Not Held | | | | | | | | | | | | | | | 1R | LQ | WD |
| Northern Ireland Open | Tournament Not Held | | | | | | 3R | 3R | 1R | 1R | | 2R | LQ | SF | 2R | 2R | 1R | QF |
| International Championship | Not Held | | LQ | 1R | 2R | 2R | 1R | 1R | 1R | 2R | | Not Held | | | 3R | 1R | 3R | LQ |
| UK Championship | LQ | LQ | LQ | 3R | QF | 2R | 2R | 2R | 1R | 2R | | 4R | QF | LQ | 1R | LQ | LQ | |
| Shoot Out | Non-Ranking Event | | | | | | W | 1R | 1R | QF | | WD | A | A | A | 2R | 1R | |
| Scottish Open | Not Held | | MR | Not Held | | | 2R | 2R | 1R | 2R | | 1R | SF | 3R | 3R | 1R | 2R | |
| German Masters | 1R | LQ | LQ | 2R | 1R | LQ | LQ | LQ | LQ | 1R | | LQ | 1R | 1R | A | QF | 1R | |
| Welsh Open | LQ | LQ | LQ | 3R | 2R | 3R | 2R | 2R | 1R | 4R | | 3R | LQ | 2R | QF | LQ | 2R | |
| World Grand Prix | Tournament Not Held | | | | NR | DNQ | 2R | QF | DNQ | DNQ | | 2R | 1R | QF | DNQ | DNQ | 1R | |
| Players Championship (Note: The event was called the Players Tour Championship Grand Final (2010/2011–2015/2016)) | DNQ | DNQ | 2R | DNQ | 2R | DNQ | 1R | QF | DNQ | DNQ | | DNQ | DNQ | DNQ | DNQ | DNQ | DNQ | |
| World Open | LQ | LQ | LQ | 1R | Not Held | | QF | QF | LQ | 2R | | Not Held | | | LQ | 1R | 1R | |
| Tour Championship | Tournament Not Held | | | | | | | | DNQ | DNQ | | DNQ | DNQ | DNQ | DNQ | DNQ | DNQ | |
| World Championship | LQ | LQ | LQ | LQ | QF | 2R | 1R | 2R | 1R | SF | | QF | 2R | QF | LQ | LQ | LQ | |
Non-ranking tournaments
| Shanghai Masters | Ranking Event | | | | | | | | 2R | A | | Not Held | | | A | A | A | A |
| Champion of Champions | Not Held | | | A | A | A | 1R | 1R | A | A | | A | A | A | A | A | A | |
| The Masters | A | A | A | A | A | A | A | 1R | A | A | | A | 1R | A | A | A | A | |
| Championship League | A | A | A | A | A | A | 2R | WD | RR | SF | RR | RR | A | RR | A | A | A | |
Former ranking tournaments
| Wuxi Classic | Non-Ranking | | LQ | LQ | 1R | Tournament Not Held | | | | | | | | | | | | |
| Australian Goldfields Open | NH | LQ | LQ | LQ | LQ | A | Tournament Not Held | | | | | | | | | | | |
| Shanghai Masters | LQ | LQ | LQ | LQ | LQ | LQ | 1R | LQ | Non-Ranking | | | Not Held | | | Non-Ranking Event | | | |
| Paul Hunter Classic | Minor-Ranking Event | | | | | | 2R | A | A | NR | | Tournament Not Held | | | | | | |
| Indian Open | Not Held | | | QF | 2R | NH | W | F | LQ | Tournament Not Held | | | | | | | | |
| Riga Masters (Note: The event was called the Riga Open (2014/2015–2015/2016)) | Tournament Not Held | | | | MR | | QF | QF | 1R | LQ | | Tournament Not Held | | | | | | |
| China Championship | Tournament Not Held | | | | | | NR | 1R | 1R | 3R | | Tournament Not Held | | | | | | |
| WST Pro Series | Tournament Not Held | | | | | | | | | | | RR | Tournament Not Held | | | | | |
| Turkish Masters | Tournament Not Held | | | | | | | | | | | | 1R | Tournament Not Held | | | | |
| Gibraltar Open | Tournament Not Held | | | | | MR | 2R | 4R | 2R | 2R | | 2R | WD | Tournament Not Held | | | | |
| WST Classic | Tournament Not Held | | | | | | | | | | | | | 2R | Tournament Not Held | | | |
| European Masters | Tournament Not Held | | | | | | QF | QF | 3R | LQ | | 4R | QF | 1R | LQ | Not Held | | |
| Saudi Arabia Masters | Tournament Not Held | | | | | | | | | | | | | | | 3R | 4R | NH |
Former non-ranking tournaments
| Scottish Professional Championship | F | Tournament Not Held | | | | | | | | | | | | | | | | |
| World Grand Prix | Tournament Not Held | | | | 1R | Ranking Event | | | | | | | | | | | | |
| Shoot Out | 1R | 1R | 2R | 1R | 2R | 2R | Ranking Event | | | | | | | | | | | |
| China Championship | Tournament Not Held | | | | | | 1R | Ranking Event | | | | Tournament Not Held | | | | | | |
| Romanian Masters | Tournament Not Held | | | | | | | 1R | Tournament Not Held | | | | | | | | | |
| Six-red World Championship | A | NH | A | A | A | 3R | A | SF | 2R | RR | | Not Held | | A | Tournament Not Held | | | |

Performance Table Legend
| LQ | lost in the qualifying draw | #R | lost in the early rounds of the tournament (WR = Wildcard round, RR = Round robin) | QF | lost in the quarter-finals |
| SF | lost in the semi-finals | F | lost in the final | W | won the tournament |
| DNQ | did not qualify for the tournament | A | did not participate in the tournament | WD | withdrew from the tournament |

| NH / Not Held | means an event was not held. |
| NR / Non-Ranking Event | means an event is/was no longer a ranking event. |
| R / Ranking Event | means an event is/was a ranking event. |
| MR / Minor-Ranking Event | means an event is/was a minor-ranking event. |

== Career finals ==
=== Ranking finals: 4 (2 titles) ===
| Outcome | No. | Year | Championship | Opponent | Score |
|---|---|---|---|---|---|
| Winner | 1. | 2016 | Indian Open | (England) Kyren Wilson | 5–2 |
| Winner | 2. | 2017 | Snooker Shoot Out | (China) Xiao Guodong | 1–0 |
| Runner-up | 1. | 2017 | Indian Open | (Scotland) John Higgins | 1–5 |
| Runner-up | 2. | 2025 | British Open | (England) Shaun Murphy | 7–10 |

=== Minor-ranking finals: 1 ===
| Outcome | No. | Year | Championship | Opponent | Score |
|---|---|---|---|---|---|
| Runner-up | 1. | 2012 | Scottish Open | (China) Ding Junhui | 2–4 |

=== Non-ranking finals: 1 ===
| Outcome | No. | Year | Championship | Opponent | Score |
|---|---|---|---|---|---|
| Runner-up | 1. | 2011 | Scottish Professional Championship | (Scotland) John Higgins | 1–6 |

=== Pro-am finals: 2 (2 titles) ===
| Outcome | No. | Year | Championship | Opponent | Score |
|---|---|---|---|---|---|
| Winner | 1. | 2015 | PMK Invitational Pro-Am | (Scotland) Michael Leslie | 4–3 |
| Winner | 2. | 2016 | PMK Invitational Pro-Am (2) | (Scotland) Graeme Dott | 4–2 |

=== Amateur finals: 7 (4 titles) ===
| Outcome | No. | Year | Championship | Opponent | Score |
|---|---|---|---|---|---|
| Winner | 1. | 2004 | Scottish Under-16 Championship | (Scotland) Anthony Hughes | 5–4 |
| Winner | 2. | 2005 | Scottish Under-16 Championship (2) | (Scotland) Neil Dillon | 5–3 |
| Runner-up | 1 | 2006 | Junior Pot Black | (England) Stuart Carrington | 0–1 |
| Runner-up | 2 | 2008 | European Under-19 Championship | (England) Stephen Craigie | 2–6 |
| Winner | 3. | 2009 | PIOS – Event 5 | (England) Farakh Ajaib | 6–0 |
| Winner | 4. | 2010 | Pontins Star of the Future | (Wales) Jamie Clarke | 4–1 |
| Runner-up | 3. | 2010 | European Under-19 Championship | (Wales) Jak Jones | 4–6 |
