= 1981 Welsh Professional Championship =

Welsh Professional Championship
Tournament information
- Dates: 5–8 February 1981
- Venue: Ebbw Vale Leisure Centre
- City: Ebbw Vale
- Country: Wales
- Organisation: WPBSA
- Format: Non-ranking event
- Total prize fund: £7,000
- Winner's share: £3,000
- Highest break: Ray Reardon (102)

Final
- Champion: Ray Reardon
- Runner-up: Cliff Wilson
- Score: 9–6

The 1981 Woodpecker Welsh Professional Championship was a professional non-ranking snooker tournament, which took place between 5 and 8 February 1981 at the Ebbw Vale Leisure Centre in Ebbw Vale, Wales.

Ray Reardon won the tournament defeating Cliff Wilson 9–6 in the final.

== Main draw ==
Quarter-finals; Best of 11 frames		Semi-finals; Best of 17 frames		Final; Best of 17 frames
		Ray Reardon	9
		Terry Griffiths	6
				Ray Reardon	9
Cliff Wilson	6			Cliff Wilson	6
Roy Andrewartha	5	Cliff Wilson	9
		Doug Mountjoy	6
