= 1954 World Professional Match-play Championship =

Tournament information
- Dates: 5 October 1953 – 6 March 1954
- Final venue: Houldsworth Hall
- Final city: Manchester
- Country: England
- Highest break: Walter Donaldson (121)

Final
- Champion: Fred Davis (ENG)
- Runner-up: Walter Donaldson (SCO)
- Score: 45–26

The 1954 World Professional Match-play Championship was a professional snooker tournament held from 5 October 1953 to 6 March 1954 across various locations in the British Isles. The final was held at Houldsworth Hall in Manchester, England. Fred Davis won his sixth World Snooker Championship title by defeating Walter Donaldson by 45 frames to 26 in the final after securing a winning lead at 36–15. Donaldson compiled a break of 121, the highest of the tournament, on the last day of the final.

There were nine entrants. Rex Williams and Harry Stokes were scheduled to play a preliminary match, with the winner joining the other seven players in the main draw, but Williams retired from the match due to illness. Defending champion Davis defeated Stokes and then John Pulman, to face Donaldson for the eighth consecutive world final. Donaldson had eliminated Kingsley Kennerley and Alec Brown to reach the final. During the final, Donaldson announced his retirement from future world championship events.

== Background ==
The World Snooker Championship is a professional tournament and the official world championship of the game of snooker. The sport was developed in the late 19th century by British Army soldiers stationed in India. Professional English billiards player and billiard hall manager Joe Davis noticed the increasing popularity of snooker compared to billiards in the 1920s, and with Birmingham-based billiards equipment manager Bill Camkin, persuaded the Billiards Association and Control Council (BACC) to recognise an official professional snooker championship in the 1926–27 season. In 1927, the final of the first professional snooker championship was held at Camkin's Hall; Davis won the tournament by beating Tom Dennis in the final. The annual competition was not titled the World Championship until 1935, but the 1927 tournament is now referred to as the first World Snooker Championship. Davis also won the title each year until 1940, when the contest was cancelled during World War II, and again when the championship resumed in 1946, accumulating a total of 15 titles before retiring from the event.

In 1952, the World Professional Match-play Championship was created following a dispute between the Professional Billiards Players' Association (PBPA) and the BACC. In response to player complaints that the BACC was taking too large a percentage of income from the tournament, the BACC claimed that the championship "has always been, and in theory is to be, regarded as an affair of honour and a test of merit", and that "every effort is made to arrange terms advantageous to the professionals competing in the championship, compatible with securing an equitable return for the promoters of it, the B.A.& C.C." The PBPA members established an alternative competition which became known as the World Professional Match-play Championship, now recognised as world championships. Fred Davis had won the world championship in 1948, 1949 and 1951, and the two previous editions of the World Professional Match-play Championship, in 1952 and 1953.

There were nine entrants for the 1954 World Professional Match-play Championship, with Rex Williams and Harry Stokes scheduled to play a qualifying match, the winner of which would join the other seven players in the main draw. Main competition matches were over 61 frames, except the final which was over 71 frames. The match was planned to take place from 5 to 7 October 1953. Williams led 3–2 after the first session. He was then ill and the match was abandoned, to be rearranged for a later date. The match was, however, later cancelled and Stokes advanced to the main draw.

== Summary ==
The first round matches were played over 61 frames. Alec Brown and John Barrie met in the first quarter-final match at the Feathers Hotel in Ealing, London, from 9 to 12 November 1953. Brown took a 10–8 lead after the first day and led 18–12 after two days and 26–22 after three days. The highest break of the match was 83, compiled by Brown. Brown won with a final score of 35–26. From 16 to 20 November, Fred Davis played Harry Stokes in the second quarter-final in Middlesbrough. Davis had a 9–3 lead after the first day, and increased this to 18–6 on the second day. He led 29–7 after three days, having compiled a break of 109 in the day's second frame. Davis took a winning 38–10 lead after four days and eventually won 45–15.

Walter Donaldson and Kingsley Kennerley faced each other in the third quarter-final in Jersey from 1 to 5 December. Donaldson led 30–18 after four days, needing just one more frame on the final day, and eventually won 36–25. John Pulman and Jackie Rea met in Belfast from 7 to 11 December, at the RAOB hall in Belfast, in the last quarter-final. It was closest of the four quarter-finals and was level at 24 frames at the start of the final day. Rea won four of the six frames on the final afternoon but Pulman won five of the first six frames in the evening to win 31–29.

Both semi-finals were played from 18 to 23 January 1954, over 61 frames. Fred Davis and John Pulman met in Bolton. Pulman led 20–16 after three days but Davis won 9 of the 12 frames on the fourth day to lead 25–23. Davis won 7 of the 13 frames on the final day to win 32–29. Donaldson and Alec Brown played their semi-final at Carlton Barracks in Leeds. At the end of the afternoon session on the second day, Brown led 10–5. Donaldson then dominated and led 29–21 after day five, including a break of 108. The final score was 36–25.

Fred Davis and Walter Donaldson met in their eighth successive final, which was held from 1 to 6 March at Houldsworth Hall, Manchester over 71 frames. Davis took a 5–1 lead in the first session, and won the second session by the same margin to finish the first day 10–2 ahead. The pair each won three frames in the third session, and Davis claimed four of the six evening frames for a ten-frame lead at 17–7, extending this to a 14 frame advantage, 25–11, the following day. Donaldson reduced his arrears slightly by winning four of the six frames in the early session on 4 March, but trailed 15–33 by the day's close. Davis secured the victory by winning the first three frames on the fifth day to lead 36–15. The final score was 45–26, with Donaldson making a break of 121, the highest of the tournament, on the final day.

It was the most one-sided of their finals. Even before losing the match, Donaldson said that he would not enter the world championship again, saying he could not give enough time to the practice he felt was necessary.

== Schedule ==
| Match | Dates | Venue, City | Ref. |
|---|---|---|---|
| Harry Stokes v Rex Williams | 5–7 October 1953 | Edinburgh, Scotland | |
| Alec Brown v John Barrie | 9–12 November 1953 | Feathers Hotel, Ealing, London, England | |
| Fred Davis v Harry Stokes | 16–20 November 1953 | Middlesbrough, England | |
| Walter Donaldson v Kingsley Kennerley | 1–5 December 1953 | Jersey | |
| John Pulman v Jackie Rea | 7–11 December 1953 | RAOB Hall, Belfast, Northern Ireland | |
| Fred Davis v John Pulman | 18–23 January 1954 | Bolton, England | |
| Walter Donaldson v Alec Brown | 18–23 January 1954 | Carlton Barracks, Leeds, England | |
| Fred Davis v Walter Donaldson | 1–6 March 1954 | Houldsworth Hall, Manchester, England | |

== Main draw ==
The results for the tournament are shown below. Players in bold are match winners.

Preliminary round: Harry Stokes (SCO) 2-3 Rex Williams (ENG); Williams then withdrew from the match due to illness.

**Quarter-finals**; 61 frames
**Fred Davis (ENG)** | **45**
Harry Stokes (SCO) | 15
**John Pulman (ENG)** | **31**
Jackie Rea (NIR) | 29
**Walter Donaldson (SCO)** | **36**
Kingsley Kennerley (ENG) | 25
**Alec Brown (ENG)** | **35**
John Barrie (ENG) | 26

**Semi-finals**; 61 frames
(England) **Fred Davis** | **32**
(England) John Pulman | 29
(Scotland) **Walter Donaldson** | **36**
(England) Alec Brown | 25

**Final**; 71 frames
(England) **Fred Davis** | **45**
(Scotland) Walter Donaldson | 26
