= 1969 Chester Professional Tournament =

Individual snooker tournament

Tournament information
- Dates: 21–23 July 1969
- Venue: Upton-By-Chester British Legion
- City: Chester
- Country: England
- Organisation: Chester & District League
- Format: Non-ranking event

Final
- Champion: Jackie Rea (NIR)
- Runner-up: John Spencer (ENG)
- Score: 4–3

The 1969 Chester Professional Tournament was an invitational non-ranking snooker tournament, which took place from 21 to 23 July 1969 at the Upton-By-Chester British Legion, Chester. Jackie Rea won the tournament by defeating John Spencer 4–3 in the final.

The tournament was part of the City of Chester Sports Fortnight, which had a programme encompassing twenty different sports. Snooker events were organised by the Chester & District League and were held at the Upton-By-Chester British Legion, with the snooker tournament featuring four professional players who competed, in a knockout format, from 21 to 23 July 1969.

In the semi-finals, Rea defeated Kingsley Kennerley 4–1, and Spencer eliminated David Taylor 4–0. In the first frame of the final, Rea was leading, but missed an attempted pot, and Spencer won the frame with a break of 62. After Rea had won the second frame, Spencer compiled a break of 56 in the third frame, but lost the tip from his cue and had to borrow a cue, during which Rea won the following two frames. Spencer was able to use his cue again in the sixth frame, but Rea won that frame as well to achieve a winning margin at 4–2. The last frame of the match went to Spencer, leaving the final score 4–3.

== Results ==
Players in bold denote match winners.

**Semi-finals**; Best of 7 frames
**John Spencer (ENG)**	**4**
David Taylor (ENG)	0
**Jackie Rea (NIR)**	**4**
Kingsley Kennerley (ENG)	1

**Final**; Best of 7 frames
John Spencer (ENG)	3
**Jackie Rea (NIR)**	4

== Final ==
Scores in bold indicate winning frame scores. Breaks over 40 are shown in parentheses.

Final: Best of 7 frames. Upton-By-Chester British Legion, Chester, 23 July 1969
John Spencer (England)	3–**4**	**Jackie Rea** (Northern Ireland)
**77** (62) – 41, 30 –**83**, **110** (56) – 38, 41–**68**, 29–**94** (41), 49–**57**, **109**–32
