= 1964 Television Tournament (snooker) =

Amateur snooker tournament

BA&CC Television Tournament
Tournament information
- Dates: 15 February – 23 May 1964
- Venue: National Liberal Club
- Country: United Kingdom
- Organisation: Billiards Association & Control Council
- Format: Single elimination
- Highest break: Jonathan Barron (ENG), 107

Final
- Champion: Jonathan Barron (ENG)
- Runner-up: Mario Berni (WAL)
- Score: 4–3

The 1964 Television Tournament was an invitational amateur snooker tournament held at the National Liberal Club in London, UK, as a series of matches starting on 15 February 1964 and with the final held on 23 May 1964. The competition was organised by the Billiards Association & Control Council and shown on ITV in the United Kingdom.

Jonathan Barron had won the invitational pro-am 1962–63 Television Tournament by defeating 4–3 Ron Gross 4–3 in the final. Barron was one of the eight players invited to take part in 1964, and won the title with a 4–3 victory against Mario Berni in the final.

== Summary ==
First round matches were played as the best-of-five frames. In the first of the matches to be held, Barron faced Mark Wildman on 15 February. Barron recorded a break of 107 in the first frame. Wildman levelled the match after making a 72 break in the second frame before Barron went on to win 3–1. Les Adams was 0–2 behind to Chris Ross, but having equalised at 2–2, missed at an attempt to pot the final pink ball in frame five. Ross then potted pink and black balls to win. In the other first round matches, John Dunning eliminated George Scott 3–2, and Ray Edmonds was whitewashed, 0–3 by Mario Berni.

The semi-finals were also best-of-five frame matches. Between matches in the Television tournament, Barron had defeated Gary Owen, the World Amateur Snooker Champion, 4–0 in the English Amateur Championship but then lost 3–5 to Ray Reardon in the Southern section semi-final. Barron led 2–0 against Ross, and won 3–1. On 9 May, Berni defeated Dunning 3–2. After Berni won the initial two frames, the highest break of the match, 60, was compiled by Dunning in winning frame three. Dunning was 24 points ahead in the deciding frame, but Berni made a break of 36 and took the frame and match.

The final took place on 23 May, as a best-of-seven frames match. Berni won the first frame despite a 33 break by Barron. Barron took the second frame, having made a break of 32. The third frame, saw Berni, who prevailed 65–40, take the lead in the match again. A 78 break by Barron, the highest of the match, saw him on level terms again at 2–2. Berni's break of 30 helped him win the fifth frame, before Barron took the sixth frame to force a decider, which he won by 93 points to 19. Billiards Association & Control Council chairman Mr. H. A. Phillips praised the quality of the match: "This match had everything; two great performers and masters of all phases of the game." The championship trophy was presented by Mrs. Phillips.

== Draw ==
Quarter-finals; Best of 5 frames
Jonathan Barron (ENG)	3
Mark Wildman (ENG)	1
Chris Ross (ENG)	3
Les Adams (ENG)	2
Mario Berni (WAL)	3
Ray Edmonds (ENG)	0
John Dunning (ENG)	3
George Scott (ENG)	2

Semi-finals; Best of 5 frames
Jonathan Barron (ENG)	3
Chris Ross (ENG)	1
Mario Berni (WAL)	3
John Dunning (ENG)	2

Final; Best of 7 frames
Jonathan Barron (ENG)	4
Mario Berni (WAL)	3
