= Chris Ross (snooker player) =

Snooker player

Personal information
- Born: 1932
- Died: 2013 (aged 80)

Sport
- Sport: Snooker
- Professional: 1976–1983

Chris Ross (1932–2013) was a former professional snooker player.

== Career ==
In 1968, Ross reached the final of the English Amateur Championship, finishing as runner-up after being defeated 6–11 by David Taylor. At the 1973 Norwich Union Open, he defeated Marcus Owen 4–3, before losing 0–4 to professional Eddie Charlton in the second round.

In 1976, he won the English Amateur Championship with an 11–7 victory over Roy Andrewartha in the final. Later that year, he participated in the 1976 IBSF World Snooker Championship and won four of his seven round-robin group matches, which was not enough to qualify for the knockout stage.Straight after the IBSF World Snooker Championship, Ross was accepted as a professional by the World Professional Billiards and Snooker Association.

Between the English Amateur Championship in April 1976 and the IBSF World Championship in November of that year, Ross was vomiting three or four times a day, and after returning from the World Championship he later found himself unable to pick up a cue. He retired from playing snooker until adopting a different stance, and an unusual style of grip on the cue stick, with his wrist underneath the implement.

In his first professional match, Ross was whitewashed 0–11 by Cliff Thorburn in a qualifying round match for the 1977 World Snooker Championship. In the 1977–78 snooker season, he defeated Jack Karnehm 5–4 in the first qualifying round for the 1977 UK Championship before losing 1–5 to Graham Miles in the second qualifying round. The only other tournament he played in was the 1978 World Snooker Championship, where he lost 1–9 to Pat Houlihan. He did not record any match wins in the following two seasons; He also played in the 1980 UK Professional English billiards championship, losing 933–1,093 to Bernard Bennett.

In his qualifying match for the 1981 World Snooker Championship, Ross found that his bridge hand was unsteady and that he was unable to control his cue properly, and conceded his match against Tony Knowles when trailing 0–7. Although he played in several tournaments over the next couple of seasons, his only match win came with a 6–5 victory over Bert Demarco at the 1982 Scottish Professional Championship. In 1983, Ross resigned his membership of the World Professional Billiards and Snooker Association. He died in 2013, aged 80.

== Career highlights ==
| Outcome | Year | Championship | Opponent in the final | Score | Ref. |
|---|---|---|---|---|---|
| Runner-up | 1968 | English Amateur Championship | David Taylor (ENG) | 6–11 | |
| Winner | 1976 | English Amateur Championship | Roy Andrewartha (WAL) | 11–7 | |
