= Matt Gibson =

Scottish snooker player

Personal information
- Born: 7 May 1953 (age 73)

Sport
- Country: Scotland
- Sport: Snooker
- Professional: 1981–1994
- Highest ranking: 50

Matt Gibson (born 7 May 1953) is a Scottish former professional snooker player.

== Career ==
Gibson was runner-up to Tony Knowles in the 1972 British Junior Championship, and defeated Ronnie Millar to win the 1980 Scottish Amateur Championship. He represented Scotland at the 1980 IBSF World Snooker Championship, finishing fourth in his seven-player qualifying group after winning three matches.

He was accepted as a professional by the World Professional Billiards and Snooker Association in 1981. He reached the final of his first event as a professional, the 1981 Scottish Professional Championship by defeating Bert Demarco 5–3 and Jim Donnelly 6–4. He lost the final 7–11 to Ian Black.

In the 1981–82 snooker season, he reached the third qualifying round of the 1981 International Open with 5–3 wins over both Sid Hood and Maurice Parkin, before being eliminated 3–5 by John Dunning. His first match in the World Snooker Championship resulted in a deciding frame defeat, 8–9 to Donnelly in the 1981 tournament.

His best performance in a ranking event was at the 1984 World Snooker Championship, where he reached the last 48, defeating Gino Rigitano and Mick Fisher, both 10–7, before being knocked out 3–10 by Joe Johnson. Gibson reached the final of the 1986 Scottish Professional Championship, losing 5–10 to Stephen Hendry after eliminating Eddie Sinclair and John Rea. He was included in the Scotland team for the 1987 World Cup, losing 0–2 against Steve Davis as his team lost 1–5 in the first round.

Gibson began the 1993–94 snooker season as 161st in the rankings, and despite winning several matches, did not compete professionally again after the end of the season. The highest ranking that he achieved during his career was 50th.

== Career finals ==
Amateur

Outcome	No.	Year	Championship	Opponent in the final	Score
Runner-up	1.	1972	British Junior Championship	Tony Knowles	
Winner	1.	1980	Scottish Amateur Championship	Ronnie Millar	

Professional

Outcome	No.	Year	Championship	Opponent in the final	Score
Runner-up	1.	1981	Scottish Professional Championship	Ian Black	7–11
Runner-up	2.	1986	Scottish Professional Championship	Stephen Hendry	5–10
