= John Rea (snooker player) =

Scottish snooker player born 1951)

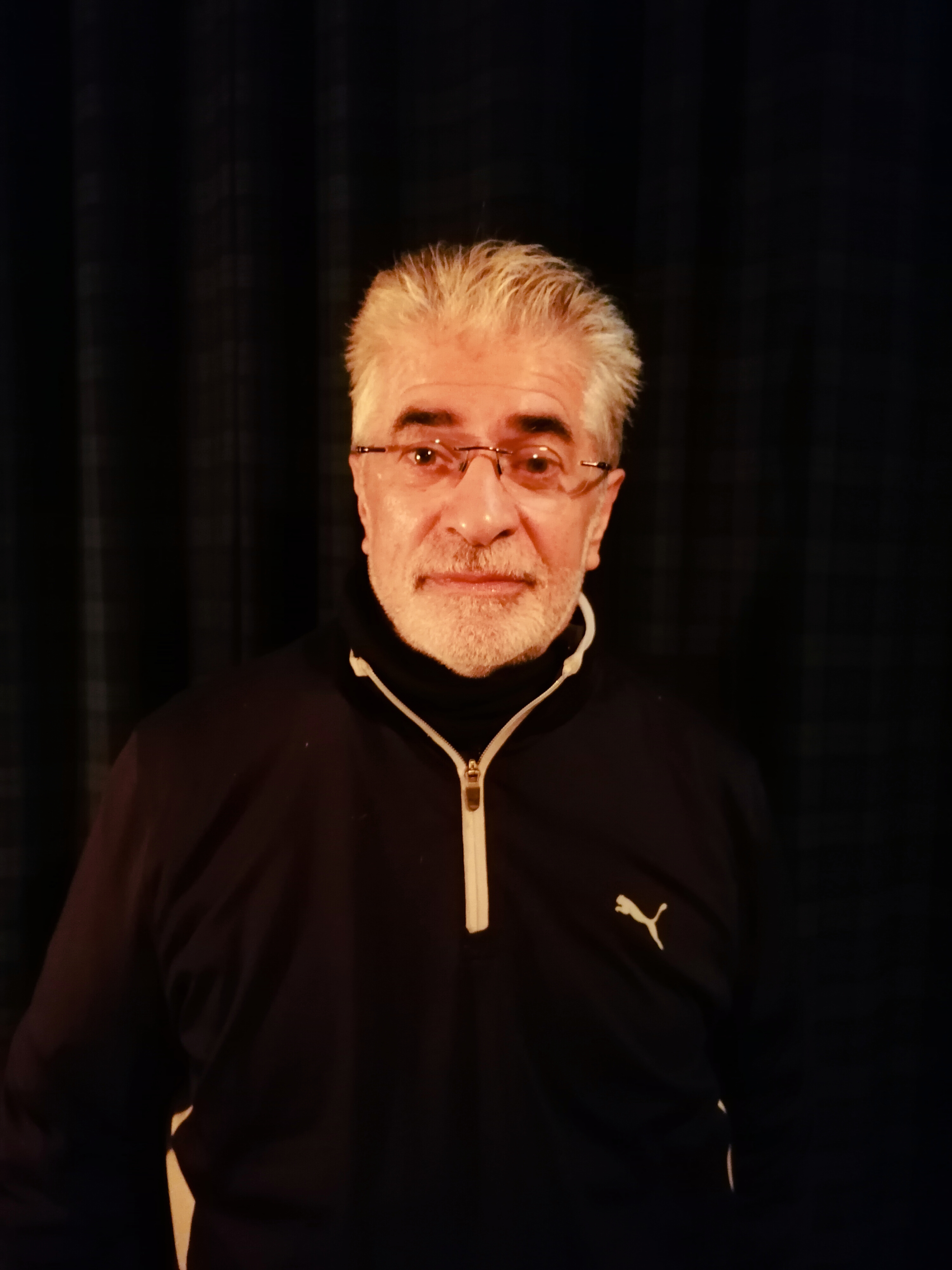

Personal information
- Born: 5 December 1951 (age 74) Edinburgh, Scotland

Sport
- Country: Scotland
- Sport: Snooker
- Professional: 1984–1994
- Highest ranking: 62 (1986–87)
- Maximum breaks: 1

John Rea (born 5 December 1951) is a retired Scottish professional snooker player.

== Career ==
Rea turned professional in 1984, recording his first victory over Jack Fitzmaurice in the Grand Prix; he reached the last 32 of this tournament, losing 1–5 to David Taylor. A run to the last 48 at the UK Championship followed this, but Joe Johnson eliminated Rea 9–6 at this stage.

Rea's campaign at the next season's UK Championship ended at the first attempt, as he recovered from 4–8 to 8–8, but eventually succumbed 8–9 to three-time world champion Fred Davis, who became, aged seventy-two, the oldest player ever to win a professional match.

He defeated another multiple world champion, Ray Reardon, in the 1986 British Open, but lost in the last 32, 5–0 to John Virgo.

Several quiet years ensued, but the 1988/1989 season provided an upturn in form for Rea; a run to the last 32 at the International Open - where he lost 4–5 to Taylor - was followed by the only professional title of his career - the 1989 Scottish Professional Championship. In his first-round match against Ian Black, he recorded a 147 maximum break. He defeated Murdo MacLeod 9–7 in the final.

In the 1989 World Championship, he defeated Dennis Hughes 10–3, Pat Houlihan 10–5 and Ray Edmonds 10–7 to reach the last 48. Requiring one more victory to make his debut at the Crucible Theatre, Rea was drawn against Steve James but, despite recovering from 2–9 to trail only 7–9, he lost the match 7–10.

The next season bore only £7,563 in prize money, the most notable point being Rea's 1–5 loss to three-time world champion John Spencer, in the European Open.

At the 1992 UK Championship, he defeated David Rippon, Brian Cassidy, Les Dodd and Tony Jones before losing 9–3 to Jason Ferguson.

Having won only one match during the 1993/1994 season, he finished it ranked 128th, and lost his place on the main tour, aged 43.

Rea entered the 2011 Scottish Professional Championship when it was revived after a twenty-two year hiatus, but was unable to defend his title, losing his first match 1–5 to Stephen Wylie.

In 2012 and 2015, he entered the World Seniors Championship, losing to Bill Oliver in the former and Mark Davis in the latter.

== Personal life ==
Rea owns the Lucky Break snooker club in Clydebank. Guests at Rea's club have included Stephen Maguire, who he managed.
