= Murdo MacLeod (snooker player) =

Scottish snooker player

Personal information
- Born: 14 January 1947 (age 79) Edinburgh, Scotland

Sport
- Country: Scotland
- Sport: Snooker
- Professional: 1981–1997
- Highest ranking: 22 (1986–1987)
- Best ranking finish: Last 16 (x9)

Murdo MacLeod (born 14 January 1947 in Edinburgh) is a Scottish former professional snooker player.

== Career ==
MacLeod turned professional in 1981, aged 34. He retained his place on the snooker circuit until the end of the 1996–1997 season, attaining a career-high ranking of 22nd, which he held from 1986 to 1987.

MacLeod progressed to the last 16 of a ranking event on nine occasions, his first being in the 1982 Professional Players Tournament, the last at the 1988 British Open, but never any further than this. He won the Scottish Professional Championship on two occasions, defeating Eddie Sinclair 11–9 in 1983 and 10–2 in 1985, and was the beaten finalist in the 1988 and 1989 editions of the tournament, losing 4–10 to Stephen Hendry and 7–9 to John Rea respectively. He played at the Crucible stages of the World Championship in 1985 which he lost 5–10 to Doug Mountjoy in the first round and in 1987 when he beat Rex Williams 10–5 before losing to defending champion Joe Johnson 7–13 in the last 16.

Having slipped gradually down the rankings in the mid-1990s, MacLeod's position of 333rd was not sufficient for him to retain his professional status, and he dropped off the snooker tour aged 50 in 1997.

=== Non-ranking wins ===
- Scottish Professional Championship - 1983, 1985
