= Walter Donaldson (snooker player) =

Scottish snooker and billiards player (1907–1973)

Personal information
- Born: 2 February 1907 Edinburgh, Scotland
- Died: 24 May 1973 (aged 66) Newport Pagnell, Buckinghamshire, England

Sport
- Country: Scotland
- Sport: Snooker
- Professional: 1923–1960

Tournament wins
- World Championship: 1947, 1950

Walter Weir Wilson Donaldson (2 February 1907 – 24 May 1973) was a Scottish professional snooker and billiards player. He contested eight consecutive world championship finals against Fred Davis from 1947 to 1954, and won the title in 1947 and 1950. Donaldson was known for his long potting and his consistency when playing, and had an aversion to the use of side. In 2012, he was inducted posthumously into the World Professional Billiards and Snooker Association's World Snooker Hall of Fame.

Donaldson became a professional player shortly after winning the under-16's British Junior English Billiards Championship in 1922 and won the Scottish professional billiards title six times. He first competed in the World Snooker Championship in 1933, but after a heavy defeat by Joe Davis did not enter again until 1939. After serving in the Fourth Indian Division during World War II, Donaldson entered the 1946 World Championship, where he lost to Davis in his first match. As a player that did not reach the championship final, he was eligible to enter the 1946 Albany Club Professional Snooker Tournament, which he won. Following Joe Davis's retirement from the World Championship in 1946, Donaldson practised intensively and won the 1947 Championship by defeating Fred Davis in the final. Davis won the following two championships, with Donaldson taking the next and then being runner-up to Davis for the next four years. Donaldson then retired from World Championship competition, although he continued to play in the News of the World Snooker Tournament until 1959.

== Early life ==
Walter Weir Wilson Donaldson was born in Edinburgh, on 2 February 1907, the son of a billiard hall manager. The family moved to Coatbridge when Donaldson was five. His father coached him in English billiards from age five, having constructed a 1 foot (30 cm) platform around one of the billiard tables so that the younger Donaldson could reach the table to play. Donaldson told an interviewer for The Billiard Player in 1939 that starting to play at a young age was a common feature among many professional players, as "when a kiddie is brought up like that, the game gets fairly into his bones, and he has much more chance than other people of becoming a good player". His father also trained Margaret Lennan, who became the unofficial "British Isles Champion" of women's billiards in 1928. Donaldson won the under-16 division of the British Junior English Billiards Championship in 1922 at the age of 15, and turned professional the following year.

== Career ==
=== Early professional career ===
Donaldson moved to Rotherham in South Yorkshire, where he managed a billiard hall, and travelled to Glasgow to win the Scottish professional billiards and snooker championships in the 1928/1929 season. He later became the owner of a billiard hall in New Ollerton, Nottinghamshire. He first entered the World Snooker Championship in 1933 defeating Willie Leigh 13 frames to 11 before losing 1–13 in the semi-finals to Joe Davis. In 1939, Donaldson said he realised from watching Davis "annihilate" him that "there was far more in the game than I had ever dreamt of". He did not participate in the championship again until 1939. His six-year absence has been attributed to a commitment to practise and improve his standard of play following the resounding defeat by Davis. In 1939, he defeated Herbert Holt and Dickie Laws in the qualifying competition, both 18–13, then Claude Falkiner 21–10 in the first round, before losing 15–16 to Sidney Smith in the quarter-finals. He finished fourth of seven players in the 1939/1940 Daily Mail Gold Cup. The BBC World Service radio station broadcast part of his match against Fred Davis.

Donaldson spoke about his playing philosophy in 1939, saying he avoided playing risky shots because he believed matches were typically lost by one player making errors: "It isn't so much that one man wins the game but that the other man loses it." Asked by the interviewer for hints for The Billiard Player's readers to help them improve their standard of play, Donaldson advised against the use of side as "it spoils the shot in at least 90 per cent of cases when it's applied by any but a first class player. And generally it really isn't necessary." He also said he had claimed the title of Scottish snooker champion because despite issuing an invitation to any challenger to play for that title, no-one had taken up the challenge.

In the 1940 World Championship, he eliminated Holt 24–7 in the first round; Joe Davis then defeated him 9–22 in the semi-final. The championship was suspended for the remainder of World War II. Donaldson was called up in 1940, and served in Canada, North Africa, Greece and Italy as a sergeant in the Royal Corps of Signals attached to the Fourth Indian Division, which was an original component of the Eighth Army when it was formed in September 1941.

The championship resumed in 1946, with Joe Davis winning again, including a 21–10 victory over Donaldson in the quarter-finals. The professional players that did not reach the 1946 final were invited to participate in the 1946 Albany Club Professional Snooker Tournament. Donaldson won, some six months after being demobilised, by defeating Alec Brown 20–11 in the final. Following his 1946 World Championship win, Davis retired from the event. In November 1946, Donaldson compiled what would have been a new world record for the highest break, 142, against John Pulman, but as the billiard table being used was not of the standard type required for a record, it was not recognised as such.

=== World championship finals and later professional career ===
Donaldson practised intensively in preparation for the 1947 World Snooker Championship, using a billiard table in a neighbour's attic. He defeated Stanley Newman 46–25 and then eliminated Horace Lindrum 39–32 to reach the final. Building refurbishment delays postponed the final, held at Leicester Square Hall, for several weeks. Donaldson used the time to continue practising. In a two-week final over 145 frames against Fred Davis, Donaldson led 4–2 after the first session and 7–5 after the second, later extending his lead to sixteen frames at 35–19. After this, Davis won six successive frames to reduce the lead to 35–25. Donaldson secured victory at 73–49 and finished the match at 82–63. His tactics during the championship involved compiling breaks of around 30 to 50 points, and playing safety rather than attempting difficult pots. Davis became frustrated with the lack of scoring chances Donaldson left for him, and missed a number of difficult pot attempts allowing Donaldson chances to win frames. There were three century breaks during the match's 145 frames, all made by Davis. Joe Davis commented after the match that, "Donaldson's long potting at present is the equal of anything seen in snooker history," whilst Fred Davis said "he is playing the best snooker I have ever seen". In his book Talking Snooker, first published in 1979, Fred Davis reflected that he had probably been "perhaps overconfident" and also had not expected Donaldson's standard to have improved so much as a result of his many hours of practice. This was the first of eight consecutive finals, from 1947 to 1954, featuring the two players.

Two wins by Joe Davis in challenge matches against Donaldson after the 1947 championship reinforced the public perception that the 15-time champion Davis was still the best player. Donaldson took a playing break of several months on medical advice, having been diagnosed with conjunctivitis after experiencing headaches. In the 1948 World Snooker Championship, held only six months after the 1947 tournament, Donaldson reached the final with wins against Kingsley Kennerley and Albert Brown. Fred Davis won 84–61 against Donaldson, having reached a winning margin at 73–52. In Talking Snooker, Davis wrote that he had consciously used the same risk-averse tactics that had paid off for Donaldson in 1947. At the 1948 Sunday Empire News Tournament, which was a round-robin event with handicaps applied, (Note: For this tournament there was an "open" handicap where a player with a lower handicap would concede a number of points in each frame based on the difference in handicap ratings. There was an additional "sealed" frame handicap that was unknown to the players and applied to the scores after the conclusion of the match.) Donaldson finished fourth of five players.

In the 1949 World Snooker Championship final, Fred Davis won 80–65 against Donaldson, having taken a winning lead of 73–58 on the previous day. The score had been 63–58 before Davis won 10 frames in a row to take the title. Donaldson made the highest break of the tournament with 115 on the last day of his semi-final match against Pulman. In the handicapped (Note: The News of the World tournaments from 1949 to 1958 were played with an "open" handicap where a player with a lower handicap would concede a number of points in each frame based on the difference in handicap ratings.) 1949/1950 News of the World Snooker Tournament, Donaldson won only two of his seven round-robin matches and placed seventh out of the eight participants.

Donaldson defeated Kennerley and Albert Brown to reach the 1950 world final against Fred Davis. the final was played over 97 frames. Davis led 8–4 after the first day, but after two more days Donaldson levelled the match at 18–18, including winning five of the last six that day. He took a four-frame lead the following day, and maintained it for several days, eventually extending it to six frames at 45–39 on the penultimate day. Donaldson's victory was confirmed on the last day when the score was 49–32, with the match ending at 51–46. Almost 3,000 spectators watched one session of the match in Blackpool. The Billiard Player magazine attributed Donaldson's success to his strong safety play and a below-par performance from Davis. The highest break Donaldson achieved during the match was 80, with Davis's highest break 79. A column in the Manchester Evening News, after the final, commented that, "So afraid were Fred Davis and Walter Donaldson ... of making any rash move which would cost them a frame that play was painfully slow at times."

With only one win from seven matches in the 1950/1951 News of the World Snooker Tournament, Donaldson finished joint-last. Donaldson and Fred Davis played the 1951 world final in Blackpool, again over 97 frames, in front of a record crowd for a World Snooker Championship match. From 6–6, Davis moved into a 12–6 lead, reaching a winning margin at 49–36 before the match concluded 58–39. Donaldson won half of his matches at the 1951/1952 News of the World Snooker Tournament, leading to a sixth-place ranking out of the nine players.

Following a dispute between the Professional Billiards Players' Association (PBPA) and the Billiards Association and Control Council (BA&CC), which derived partly from the PBPA members feeling that the BA&CC was taking too large a share of the income from tournaments, most professional players boycotted the 1952 World Snooker Championship and competed instead in their own 1952 World Professional Match-play Championship. As this event included most of the leading players, the public perceived it as the real world championship. The World Professional Match-play Championships are now accepted by snooker historians as part of the World Snooker Championship series. The 1952 World Professional Match-play Championship final featured Fred Davis and Donaldson and was contested across 73 frames. Davis won six of the eight frames in their first session, and led 7–5 after the first day. Donaldson had compiled a break of 104. Donaldson recorded another century break of 106 in the twentieth frame, but Davis increased his lead over him to 14–10 by the end of the second day. On the third day, Davis achieved a break of 140, a new World Championship record, and Donaldson made a 111. Davis finished the day 21–15 ahead. After another day's play, Davis was 29–19 ahead, after which Donaldson won eight of the next twelve frames. Davis won the title, finishing the last day at 38–35.

The 1952/1953 News of the World Snooker Tournament finished in January 1953, with Donaldson's three wins in eight matches enough to see him finish third. The 1953 World Professional Match-play Championship final in March saw Donaldson and Davis even at 6–6 after the first day of the 71-frame match. Donaldson took a 13–11 lead after day two, despite a break of 107 by Davis. Donaldson was ahead 20–16 after day three, but Davis tied the match at 24–24 after the fourth day which included a century of 102. Davis led 28–26, but Donaldson took a 31–29 lead at the end of the fifth day. The match was again level at 33–33 after the final afternoon session, before Davis won 37–34.

Donaldson placed seventh in the 1953/1954 News of the World Snooker Tournament, having lost five of his eight matches. In the 1954 World Professional Match-play Championship, Fred Davis and Donaldson met in their eighth successive final. It was the most one-sided of the finals, with Davis leading 33–15 after four days in the 71-frame contest. Even before losing the match, Donaldson said he would not enter the World Championship again because he could not give enough time to the practice he felt was necessary. Davis secured victory by winning the first three frames on the fifth day to lead 36–15. The final score was 45–26 with Donaldson making a break of 121 on the final day.

After the 1954 World Match-play final, Donaldson announced that he would not be playing in any future World Snooker Championships, as he wanted to focus more on the management of his smallholding, although he stated his intention to continue to play in other tournaments and in exhibition matches. With three wins at the 1954/1955 News of the World Snooker Tournament, he failed to gain a high placing. He finished third in 1955/1956, and last in 1956/1957. Donaldson inflicted Fred Davis's only defeat in the 1957/1958 News of the World Snooker Tournament (21–16), before finishing third of five players in the final table. Earlier in the same tournament he defeated Joe Davis, also by 21–16, but had received a 14-point start. He did, however, make the highest break of the season, 141. He finished bottom of four players in the 1958 News of the World Snooker Tournament table, with one win in nine matches. In 1960, he retired completely from competitive play.

== Retirement and legacy ==
Donaldson was married to Ida, whom he met whilst working in Rotherham in the 1920s. After retiring from the sport, he converted his snooker room into a cowshed, breaking up the slates from his billiard table to make a path, and preferred to play bowls rather than snooker. In 1971, he stood as a Conservative Party candidate for the Newport Pagnell Urban District council and was elected. He died in an ambulance on his way to hospital after suffering a heart attack at his home in Newport Pagnell, Buckinghamshire, on 24 May 1973.

He was considered one of the greatest long potters of all time, and a very consistent player, partly due to his avoidance of the use of side. Joe Davis wrote of Donaldson in 1948 that:

"He pots with great accuracy, and that cool leisurely style of his will take a lot of breaking down. Many players who watch Donaldson go away vowing to copy his square 'two-eyed' stance, but the chief merits of his style are the closeness to his body of both arms and the quiet, slow, easy-looking rhythm of his action."

Fred Davis praised Donaldson's potting ability and described him as a "fierce competitor" although "very limited technically". In noting that Fred Davis and Donaldson dominated the game of snooker for several years, Lindrum described their "new approach" to snooker of "extensive safety tactics", recalling that the pair once shared 32 strokes on a single yellow ball, and suggesting that although safety play demanded skill, "if safety had continued to be used without regard to audience appreciation, it may eventually have brought about a sharp decline in popularity".

Donaldson's obituary in Snooker Scene highlighted his "imperturbability" as a playing strength and claimed "his long potting was the best the game has ever seen", whilst noting that his aversion to applying side was probably the reason that he did not achieve more century breaks, as it limited his positional play. The 2005 book Masters of the Baize describes Donaldson as "one of the most underrated [world professional snooker] champions", who "redefined the standards of long potting", while a 1989 book by Ian Morrison describes him as "the first great Scottish snooker professional". In 2012, Donaldson was inducted into the World Professional Billiards and Snooker Association's World Snooker Hall of Fame.

== Snooker performance timeline ==
=== Pre-war ===
Tournament	1931/ 32	1932/ 33	1933/ 34	1934/ 35	1935/ 36	1936/ 37	1937/ 38	1938/ 39	1939/ 40
BPA Professional Championship	W	Tournament Not Held							
Daily Mail Gold Cup (Note: Round-robin handicap tournament.) (Note: Billiards event before the 1936/37 season.)	Tournament Not Held					A	A	A	4
World Championship	A	SF	A	A	A	A	A	QF	SF

=== Post-war ===
Tournament	1945/ 46	1946/ 47	1947/ 48	1948/ 49	1949/ 50	1950/ 51	1951/ 52	1952/ 53	1953/ 54	1954/ 55	1955/ 56	1956/ 57	1957/ 58	1958/ 59
Sunday Empire News Tournament	Not Held			4	Tournament Not Held									
Sporting Record Masters' Tournament	Tournament Not Held				4	Tournament Not Held								
World Professional Match-play Championship	Tournament Not Held						F	F	F	A	A	A	Not Held	
News of the World Snooker Tournament	Tournament Not Held				7	7	6	3	7	5	3	6	3	4
World Championship	QF	W	F	F	W	F	A	Tournament Not Held						

Performance Table Legend
W	won the tournament	F	lost in the final	SF	lost in the semi–finals
QF	lost in the quarter-finals	N	N = position in round-robin event	A	did not participate in the tournament

== Career finals ==
=== Snooker (4 titles) ===
Outcome	No.	Year	Championship	Opponent in the final	Score	Ref.
Winner	1.	1932	BPA Professional Championship (Note: BPA tournaments did not attract the leading players.)	AE Bridgewater (ENG)	4–3	
Winner	2.	1946	Albany Club Professional Snooker Tournament	Alec Brown (SCO)	20–11	
Winner	3.	1947	World Snooker Championship	Fred Davis (ENG)	82–63	
Runner-up	1.	1948	World Snooker Championship	Fred Davis (ENG)	61–84	
Runner-up	2.	1949	World Snooker Championship	Fred Davis (ENG)	65–80	
Winner	4.	1950	World Snooker Championship	Fred Davis (ENG)	51–46	
Runner-up	3.	1951	World Snooker Championship	Fred Davis (ENG)	39–58	
Runner-up	4.	1952	World Professional Match-play Championship	Fred Davis (ENG)	35–38	
Runner-up	5.	1953	World Professional Match-play Championship	Fred Davis (ENG)	34–37	
Runner-up	6.	1954	World Professional Match-play Championship	Fred Davis (ENG)	26–45	

=== English billiards (8 titles) ===
Outcome	Year	Championship	Opponent in the final	Score	Ref.
Winner	1922	British Junior English Billiards Championship (Under-16)	Harold Renaut	1,000–686	
Winner	1929	Scottish Professional Billiards Championship	Alexander Taylor	7,000–5,124	
Winner	1930	Scottish Professional Billiards Championship	Alexander Taylor	7,000–6,505	
Winner	1931	Scottish Professional Billiards Championship	Willie Smith	7,847–5,048	
Winner	1932	Scottish Professional Billiards Championship	Alexander Taylor	7,335–4,150	
Winner	1932	Billiards Professionals' Association Championship	L.W. Bateman	2,500–2,486	
Winner	1934	Scottish Professional Billiards Championship	W. Hefferman	7,000–3,434	
Winner	1938	Scottish Professional Billiards Championship	Harry Stokes	7,000–5,336	
