= 1949 World Snooker Championship =

Tournament information
- Dates: 21 February – 7 May 1949
- Venue: Leicester Square Hall
- City: London
- Country: England
- Organisation: Billiards Association and Control Council
- Highest break: Walter Donaldson (SCO) (115)

Final
- Champion: Fred Davis (ENG)
- Runner-up: Walter Donaldson (SCO)
- Score: 80–65

The 1949 World Snooker Championship was a snooker tournament held at Leicester Square Hall in London, England from 21 February to 7 May 1949, organised by the Billiards and Snooker Control Council. There were 12 entrants, of which eight participated in the main draw. Seven players were placed directly into the main draw. They were joined by Conrad Stanbury, who won the qualifying competition which was held from 10 to 19 February at the same venue. Stanbury won all three of his qualifying matches on the deciding frame.

For the third successive year, the final was contested by Fred Davis and Walter Donaldson. Davis became the second player to successfully defend his first world title, after his brother Joe Davis in 1928, by defeating Donaldson 80–65 in the final. He had taken a winning lead of 73–58 on the previous day. The match was still in the balance with the score at 63–58 before Davis won 10 frames in a row to secure victory. Donaldson made the highest break of the tournament, 115, on the last day of his semi-final match against John Pulman. It followed his break of 100 in the previous frame, and was the first time that century breaks had been made in consecutive frames in competition.

== Background ==
The World Snooker Championship is a professional tournament and the official world championship of the game of snooker. The sport was developed in the late 19th century by British Army soldiers stationed in India. Professional English billiards player and billiard hall manager Joe Davis noticed the increasing popularity of snooker compared to billiards in the 1920s, and with Birmingham-based billiards equipment manager Bill Camkin, persuaded the Billiards Association and Control Council (BACC) to recognise an official professional snooker championship in the 1926–27 season. In 1927, the final of the first professional snooker championship was held at Camkin's Hall; Davis won the tournament by beating Tom Dennis in the final. The annual competition was not titled the World Championship until the 1935 tournament, but the 1927 tournament is now referred to as the first World Snooker Championship. Davis had also won the title every year from 1928 to 1940, after which the tournament was not held again until 1946 due to World War II. Fred Davis was the defending champion, having defeated Walter Donaldson 84–61 in the 1948 final.

There were 12 entrants for the 1949 championship. Seven players were placed in the main draw, to be joined by the winner of the five-player qualifying competition.

== Schedule ==
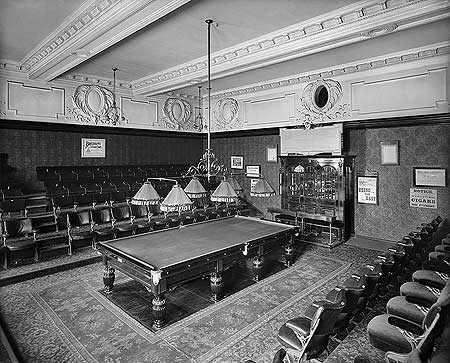
The Leicester Square Hall match room (pictured in 1903)

Schedule of matches for the 1949 World Snooker Championship
Match	Dates	Venue, city	Ref.
Walter Donaldson v Conrad Stanbury	21–26 February 1949	Leicester Square Hall, London	
Sidney Smith v Alec Brown	28 February–5 March 1949	Leicester Square Hall, London	
Fred Davis v Kingsley Kennerley	7–12 March 1949	Leicester Square Hall, London	
John Pulman v Albert Brown	14–19 March 1949	Leicester Square Hall, London	
Walter Donaldson v John Pulman	28 March–2 April 1949	Leicester Square Hall, London	
Fred Davis v Sidney Smith	4–9 April 1949	Leicester Square Hall, London	
Fred Davis v Walter Donaldson	25–30 April, 2–7 May 1949	Leicester Square Hall, London	

== Tournament summary ==
=== Quarter-finals ===
The quarter-finals were played over 71 frames. Walter Donaldson led Conrad Stanbury 4–2, 5–1 and 9–3, with four of his nine frames won on the final black ball. He increased his lead to 18–6, and to 29–7. On the fourth day of the match, Donaldson made a 104 break in the first frame, and finished the day 38–10 ahead, having secured a winning margin at 36–10. On the penultimate day, Donaldson took eleven of the twelve frames played, and the final score was 58–13. The reporter for The Billiard Player magazine wrote that Donaldson played "brilliant pots and almost audacious shots, some of which might never have been seen even in an exhibition match".

Having taken an early lead, Sidney Smith defeated Alec Brown 41–30, having made the highest break of the match, 98. Fred Davis led Kingsley Kennerley 18–6 and 23–6, and secured a winning margin at 36–13. His 104 break during the afternoon session on 10 March was the highest of the match. Kennerley won five of the six frames on the last afternoon and finished 21–50 behind. John Pulman established a winning lead of 36–24 on the penultimate day of his match against Albert Brown, to reach the semi-finals of the world championship for the first time. After dead frames, the final score was 42–29.

=== Semi-finals ===
The semi-finals were contested over 71 frames. Donaldson made breaks of 100 and 115 in successive frames against Pulman. It was the first time that century breaks had been made in consecutive frames in competition, and the 115 was the highest break of the tournament. He achieved a winning margin by winning the first frame on 1 April to make it 36–13. The eventual score was 49–22.

Smith and Davis each won six frames on the first day of their match, and were level again at 9–9 before Davis gained a lead of 13–11 at the end of the second day. Davis secured a winning margin at 36–18, and won 42–29 after dead frames.

=== Final ===
The final was contested over 145 frames. For the third consecutive year, the final was contested by Donaldson and Davis. The match started on 25 April, as the best-of-145 frames. Donaldson took a 7–5 lead on the first day. He was still two frames ahead, 13–11, after the second day, but the third day finished with the players level at 18–18. Donaldson regained a two-frame lead (25–23) the next day, and increased his lead to 34–26 on 29 April.

Davis had reduced his deficit, at 33–39, by the end of day 6, and made a break of 102 in the last of those frames; It was the only century break of the match. Donaldson maintained a six frame lead (45–39) after the next day of play. Davis then took eight of twelve frames on 3 May, including all six frames in the earlier of the two sessions, to lead 49–47. He moved a further two frames ahead on both of the next two days, and led 63–57.

He then won 10 frames in a row on 6 May to secure the title at 73–58. A reporter for The Times commented that on the decisive day, Davis was in "his best form of the match". After 13 dead frames on 7 May, the final score was 80–65 to Davis.

Davis became the second player to successfully defend his first world snooker title, after his brother Joe Davis in 1928. The championship trophy was presented by Aubrey Ellwood, Air Officer Commanding-in-Chief Bomber Command. Richard Holt of the Billiards Association and Control Council's magazine The Billiard Player felt that Davis was "the 'compleat' snooker player", who demonstrated skill in potting, safety play and tactics. Snooker historian Clive Everton later noted that several of the sessions took more than three hours and wrote that "caution was the watchword".

== Main draw ==
Results of the main tournament were are follows.

Quarter-finals; 71 frames
Fred Davis (ENG)	50
Kingsley Kennerley (ENG)	21
Sidney Smith (ENG)	41
Alec Brown (ENG)	30
Walter Donaldson (SCO)	58
Conrad Stanbury (CAN)	13
Albert Brown (ENG)	29
John Pulman (ENG)	42

Semi-finals; 71 frames
Fred Davis (ENG)	42
Sidney Smith (ENG)	29
Walter Donaldson (SCO)	49
John Pulman (ENG)	22

Final; 145 frames
Fred Davis (ENG)	80
Walter Donaldson (SCO)	65

== Qualifying Tournament ==
John Barrie withdrew for business reasons, giving Herbert Holt a bye into the final of the qualifying event. Conrad Stanbury beat Herbert Francis 18–17 in his first round match played from 10 to 12 February 1949 and then beat Jackie Rea by the same score in a match played from 14 to 16 February. Stanbury then played Holt in the final of the qualifying from 17 to 19 February and recorded his third 18–17 victory. The Billiard Player magazine commented that for Stanbury to win three successive matches on the deciding frame was "a quite unusual sequence". All three qualifying matches were at Leicester Square Hall.

Round 1 Best of 35 frames		Round 2 Best of 35 frames		Final; Best of 35 frames
		Herbert Holt (ENG)	w/o
		John Barrie (ENG)	w/d
				Herbert Holt (ENG)	17
Conrad Stanbury (CAN)	18			Conrad Stanbury (CAN)	18
Herbert Francis (ENG)	17	Conrad Stanbury (CAN)	18
		Jackie Rea (NIR)	17
