= 1948 World Snooker Championship =

Tournament information
- Dates: 9 February – 1 May 1948
- Final venue: Leicester Square Hall
- Final city: London
- Country: England
- Organisation: Billiards Association and Control Council
- Highest break: Fred Davis (ENG) (109)

Final
- Champion: Fred Davis (ENG)
- Runner-up: Walter Donaldson (SCO)
- Score: 84–61

The 1948 World Snooker Championship was a professional snooker tournament that took place from 9 March to 1 May 1948. It was an edition of the World Snooker Championship first held in 1927. A qualifying event with eight participants was held from 1 to 13 December 1947 at Burroughes Hall and was won by John Pulman, who joined seven other players in the main event.

The final was held at Leicester Square Hall in London, England, from 19 April to 1 May 1948. For the second year running the final was contested by Fred Davis and Walter Donaldson. Davis won his first World title by defeating Donaldson 84 frames to 61 in the final, having already reached a winning margin at 73–52. Davis also made the highest break of the tournament, 109.

== Background ==
The World Snooker Championship is a professional tournament and the official world championship of the game of snooker. The sport was developed in the late 19th century by British Army soldiers stationed in India. Professional English billiards player and billiard hall manager Joe Davis noticed the increasing popularity of snooker compared to billiards in the 1920s, and with Birmingham-based billiards equipment manager Bill Camkin, persuaded the Billiards Association and Control Council (BACC) to recognise an official professional snooker championship in the 1926–27 season. In 1927, the final of the first professional snooker championship was held at Camkin's Hall; Davis won the tournament by beating Tom Dennis in the final. The annual competition was not titled the World Championship until the 1935 tournament, but the 1927 tournament is now referred to as the first World Snooker Championship. Davis had also won the title every year from 1928 to 1940, after which the tournament was not held again until 1946 due to World War II. Walter Donaldson was the defending champion, having defeated Fred Davis 82–63 in the 1947 final.

== Format ==
The closing date for players to enter the tournament was 18 February 1946. There were fifteen entrants. Eight were placed in "Section B", which was to produce one qualifier to join the other seven players in "Section A", the main competition. Section B was scheduled at Burroughes Hall in London between 1 December 1946 and 14 January 1947, with all matches consisting of 35 frames. Matches in Section A were played as the best of 71 frames, except the final which was the best of 145 frames. The quarter-finals were played at four different venues in England between 9 February and 27 March. The semi-finals took place between 29 March and 10 April at Leicester Square Hall, with the final played at the same venue from 19 April to 1 May.

== Dates and venues of matches ==
Schedule of matches for the 1948 World Snooker Championship
Match	Dates	Venue, city	Ref.
Clark McConachy v John Pulman	9–14 February 1948	Ambulance Drill Hall, Rochdale	
Albert Brown v Sidney Smith	1–4 March 1948	Clifton Hotel, Blackpool	
Fred Davis v Alec Brown	15–20 March 1948	Houldsworth Hall, Manchester	
Walter Donaldson v Kingsley Kennerley	22–25, 27 March 1948	Burroughes Hall, Newcastle	
Walter Donaldson v Albert Brown	29 March–3 April 1948	Leicester Square Hall, London	
Fred Davis v Clark McConachy	5–10 April 1948	Leicester Square Hall, London	
Walter Donaldson v Fred Davis	19–24, 26 April–1 May 1948	Leicester Square Hall, London	

== Tournament summary ==
The first of the quarter-finals in the main competition was between John Pulman, who won Section B, and Clark McConachy. Each player won six of the 12 frames played on the first day of their match. On the second day, McConachy took 11 of 12 frames for a 17–7 lead. McConachy maintained a ten frame lead after the next day, and extended his advantage to 12 frames at 30–18 by the close of day four. McConachy attained a winning lead on the fifth day, which he finished 38–22 ahead. After dead frames, the final score was 42–29. Sidney Smith and Albert Brown were tied at 16–16. Going into the final session, Brown led 34–30. Smith won five consecutive frames, before Brown won the next two for a 36–35 deciding frame victory.

Alec Brown was affected by severe arthritis during his match against Davis, and lost 28–43. Davis took a 9–3 lead on the first day of their match, and, having made a break of 103 on the third day, finished it 24–12 ahead. Brown took seven of the 12 frames on day 4, but Davis secured a win at 36–24. Donaldson drew 7–7 with Kingsley Kennerley on the first day of their contest, and won 11 of the 14 frames on day 2, for an 18–10 lead. Donaldson reached a winning margin at 36–23, and made a break of 100 in the closing stages. The match finished 46–25.

Donaldson and Albert Brown were level at 3–3 after their first semi-final session; Donaldson moved into an 8–4 lead by the close of the first day of their match. He doubled his lead to 16–8 the next day, but Brown narrowed the gap to four frames at 20–16 on day 3. Day four saw Donaldson move to 27–21 ahead, and at the close of day five he led 34–26. Donaldson eliminated Brown; the score was 40–31 after dead frames. Davis took a 9–3 lead against McConachy on the first day of their semi-final, and extended this to 15–3 after the next session. He compiled a break of 101 in frame 23 and finished the second day 20–4 ahead. McConachy won four of the six frames in the earlier session on day three, and each player took three frames in the later session. On day four, with both players winning three of the early session frames, it was 28–14 to Davis; at the close of that day he led 32–16. Davis reached a winning margin at 36–22; the score after dead frames was 43–28. Davis made a break of 109 during the match.

=== Final ===
Fred Davis reached the final for the third consecutive year, where he faced the defending champion, Walter Donaldson. On the first day, 19 April, Davis won seven of the 12 frames played. He achieved the same outcome on the second day, to lead 14–10, and on the third day to lead 21–15. At the close of the fourth day's play, Davis had increased his lead to ten frame at 29–19; a day later, he led 37–23.

Taking eight of the twelve frames on 24 April meant that Davis led 45–27 at the end of the first week. when the match resumed on 26 April, Donaldson reduced his arrears, to 14 frames, at 35–49; remaining 14 behind at conclusion of both of the next two days of play, as each player took six frames each day. Davis won all six frames of the following day's first session, and three of six frames in the later session, leaving him three frames from victory at 70–50. On 30 April, Davis won the second, fourth and fifth frames to give him a decisive lead of 73–52. After dead frames, the score was 86–61. Davis's highest break of the match was 96, whist Donaldson's was 88. According to the reporter for The Billiard Player magazine, the final "was a keenly contested struggle, neither player taking any undue risk. This at times made some of the games slow and even tedious to watch". The correspondent for The Times wrote that "it seems highly probable ... that F. Davis will prove most difficult to beat for some years to come." The championship trophy was presented to Davis by Francis Douglas, 11th Marquess of Queensberry.

In his autobiography, Davis described Donaldson's style of play as patient, cautious and risk-averse. Davis felt that in the 1947 final, his own lack of patience, which meant he took chances to pot balls which sometimes failed and presented opportunities for Donaldson, was a factor in his defeat. He decided that in 1948, "the way to beat him, unfortunately for the spectators, was to play him at his own game."

== Main draw ==
The results for the main competition (Section A) were as follows. Winning players are denoted in bold.

**Quarter-finals**; 71 frames		**Semi-finals**; 71 frames		**Final**; 145 frames
**Walter Donaldson (SCO)**	**46**
Kingsley Kennerley (ENG)	25	(Scotland) **Walter Donaldson**	**40**
Sidney Smith (ENG)	35	(England) Albert Brown	31
**Albert Brown (ENG)**	**36**			(Scotland) Walter Donaldson	61
**Fred Davis (ENG)**	**43**			(England) **Fred Davis**	**84**
Alec Brown (ENG)	28	(England) **Fred Davis**	**43**
**Clark McConachy (NZL)**	**42**	(New Zealand) Clark McConachy	28
John Pulman (ENG)	29

== Qualifying Tournament ==
All qualifying matches were held at Burroughes Hall in London. The first-round matches were held from 1 to 13 December 1947. In the first match Sydney Lee conceded his match to John Pulman before the second day's play because of an abscess on his neck. Pulman was leading 8–2 after the first day. Only 10 frames had been played because of a power cut which curtailed the afternoon session to three frames. Conrad Stanbury comfortably won the second match, against Eric Newman, taking a 19–5 winning lead after the second day. The third match between Willie Leigh and Herbert Holt was very close. Leigh won the final frame 83–35 to win the match. The final first-round match, between John Barrie and Herbert Francis was also close. The match was 12–12 after two days. Barrie won the match 19–16.

The semi-finals were held from 5 to 10 January 1948. Pulman beat Stanbury in the first semi-final, taking a winning 18–15 lead on the final evening. In the second semi-final Leigh led 10–6 and won 21–14. Barrie made a break of 101 during the final evening session. In the final, played from 12 to 14 January, Leigh led 7–5 after the first day and 13–11 after two days. The match went to a final frame decider with Pulman winning 60–49, potting the last black.

The results of the qualifying competition (Section B) are shown below. winning players are denoted in bold.

**Round 1**; 35 frames		**Round 2**; 35 frames		**Final**; 35 frames
**John Pulman (ENG)**	**w/o**
Sydney Lee (ENG)	w/d	(England) **John Pulman**	**19**
**Conrad Stanbury (CAN)**	**26**	(Canada) Conrad Stanbury	16
Eric Newman (ENG)	9			(England) **John Pulman**	**18**
Herbert Francis (ENG)	16			(England) Willie Leigh	17
**John Barrie (ENG)**	**19**	(England) John Barrie	14
**Willie Leigh (ENG)**	**18**	(England) **Willie Leigh**	**21**
Herbert Holt (ENG)	17

== Century breaks ==
The following century breaks were made during the tournament; Fred Davis's break of 109 against Clark McConachy in their semi-final match was the highest.

- 109, 103, 101 – Fred Davis
- 101 – John Barrie
- 100 – Walter Donaldson
