= 1947 World Snooker Championship =

Tournament information
- Dates: 20 January – 25 October 1947
- Final venue: Leicester Square Hall
- Final city: London
- Country: England
- Organisation: Billiards Association and Control Council
- Highest break: Fred Davis (ENG) (135)

Final
- Champion: Walter Donaldson (SCO)
- Runner-up: Fred Davis (ENG)
- Score: 82–63

The 1947 World Snooker Championship was a professional snooker tournament that took place from 20 January to 25 October 1947. The final was held at the Leicester Square Hall in London, England, from 13 to 25 October. The semi-finals were completed in March, but the final was delayed due to building works at the venue, which had been bombed in October 1940. Walter Donaldson won the title by defeating Fred Davis by 82 frames to 63 in the final, although he reached the winning margin earlier, at 73–49. Davis made the highest break of the tournament with a 135 clearance in frame 86 of the final.

The 1947 event was the first to be played since the retirement of Joe Davis who had won all 15 of the previous Championships since it was inaugurated in 1927. Davis had announced in October 1946 that he would no longer play in the competition. A qualifying competition for thirteen entrants at Burroughes Hall in London from 2 January to 8 February 1947 was won by Albert Brown, who then joined seven other players in the main competition. The quarter-finals and semi-finals took place from 20 January to 15 March at various venues in England.

== Background ==
The World Snooker Championship is a professional tournament and the official world championship of the game of snooker. The sport was developed in the late 19th century by British Army soldiers stationed in India. Professional English billiards player and billiard hall manager Joe Davis noticed the increasing popularity of snooker compared to billiards in the 1920s, and with Birmingham-based billiards equipment manager Bill Camkin, persuaded the Billiards Association and Control Council (BACC) to recognise an official professional snooker championship in the 1926–27 season. In 1927, the final of the first professional snooker championship was held at Camkin's Hall; Davis won the tournament by beating Tom Dennis in the final. The annual competition was not titled the World Championship until the 1935 tournament, but the 1927 tournament is now referred to as the first World Snooker Championship. Davis had also won the title every year from 1928 to 1940, after which the tournament was not held again until 1946 due to World War II. The World Championship was the first to be played since the retirement from the competition of Joe Davis who had won all 15 of the previous Championships. He had announced in October 1946 that he would no longer play in the World Championship.

=== Format ===
The closing date for entries for the 1947 championship was 23 November 1946. The entry fee was five guineas per player, with five per cent of gate receipts to be paid to the BACC. This was reduced to two guineas, and the same percentage of gate receipts, after representations to the BACC by the Professional Billiard Players Association. Twenty players entered; thirteen of them were placed in "Section B", which was to produce one qualifier to join the other seven players in "Section A", the main competition. The "Section B" matches were held at Burroughes Hall in London from 2 January to 8 February 1947, all played across 35 frames. The quarter finals and semi finals were played at different venues in England, across 71 frames, except for two of the quarter-finals which were across 73 frames. The final was played over 145 frames from 13 to 25 October 1947 at Leicester Square Hall.

== Dates and venues of matches ==
Match	Dates	Venue, city	Ref.
Fred Davis v Clark McConachy	20–25 January 1947	Clifton Hotel, Blackpool	
Sidney Smith v Alec Brown	27 January – 1 February 1947	Burroughes Hall, Newcastle	
Horace Lindrum v Albert Brown	10–15 February 1947	Burroughes Hall, London	
Walter Donaldson v Stanley Newman	10–15 February 1947	Palais de Danse, Wellington, Shropshire	
Fred Davis v Sidney Smith	17–22 February 1947	Houldsworth Hall, Manchester	
Walter Donaldson v Horace Lindrum	10–15 March 1947	St George's Hall, Liverpool	
Walter Donaldson v Fred Davis	13–18, 20–25 October 1947	Leicester Square Hall, London	

== Tournament summary ==
=== Quarter-finals and semi-finals ===
Fred Davis took a 6–0 lead in the first session of his match against Clark McConachy. McConachy only won the 15th frame during the first three sessions, and Davis led 17–1 as they started the fourth session, during which McConachy took the 22nd fame. Davis finished the second day 22–2 ahead. Each player won three frames in the fifth session; McConachy recorded an 85 break, the highest of the match to that point. Davis secured his progress to the next round at 37–7, with two days of the match still remaining. During the dead frames, McConachy compiled a break of 132; the final score was 53–20 to Davis. Sidney Smith achieved a 106 break in the fifth session against Alec Brown; by taking five of that sessions six frames, Smith led 23–7, and he increased his advantage to 27–9 during the following session. After reaching a winning margin at 37–22, Smith won 44–29 following dead frames.

After Horace Lindrum built a 5–1 lead in their first session, Albert Brown won four successive frames in the next session and finished the first day at 5–7. Brown took the lead by adding the first three frames of the third session, but was four frames behind at 10–14 by the close of the second day's play. The eventual score was 39–34 to Lindrum. Donaldson practised intensively in preparation for the Championship, using a billiard table in a neighbour's attic. He won both of the first two sessions by a 4–2 margin against Stanley Newman, and despite losing both sessions on the third day, was 21–15 ahead afterwards. From 25 to 19 ahead, he took the next eight frames, and went on to win 46–25.

In the first semi-final, Davis held a 9–3 lead against Smith. During the sixth session, Davis made a century break, which was followed in the next frame by an 83 break from Smith. Davis won 39–32 after securing a win at 36–28. Donaldson whitewashed Lindrum 6–0 in their first session. In the next session, each player won three frames. On day three, Donaldson moved ten frames ahead at 20–10, but Lindrum reduced the margin to six frames, at 20–15, by the end of the day. Going into the last day, Donaldson was 32–28 up; he secured a place in the final at 36–30. With dead frames, the final score was 39–32.

=== Final ===
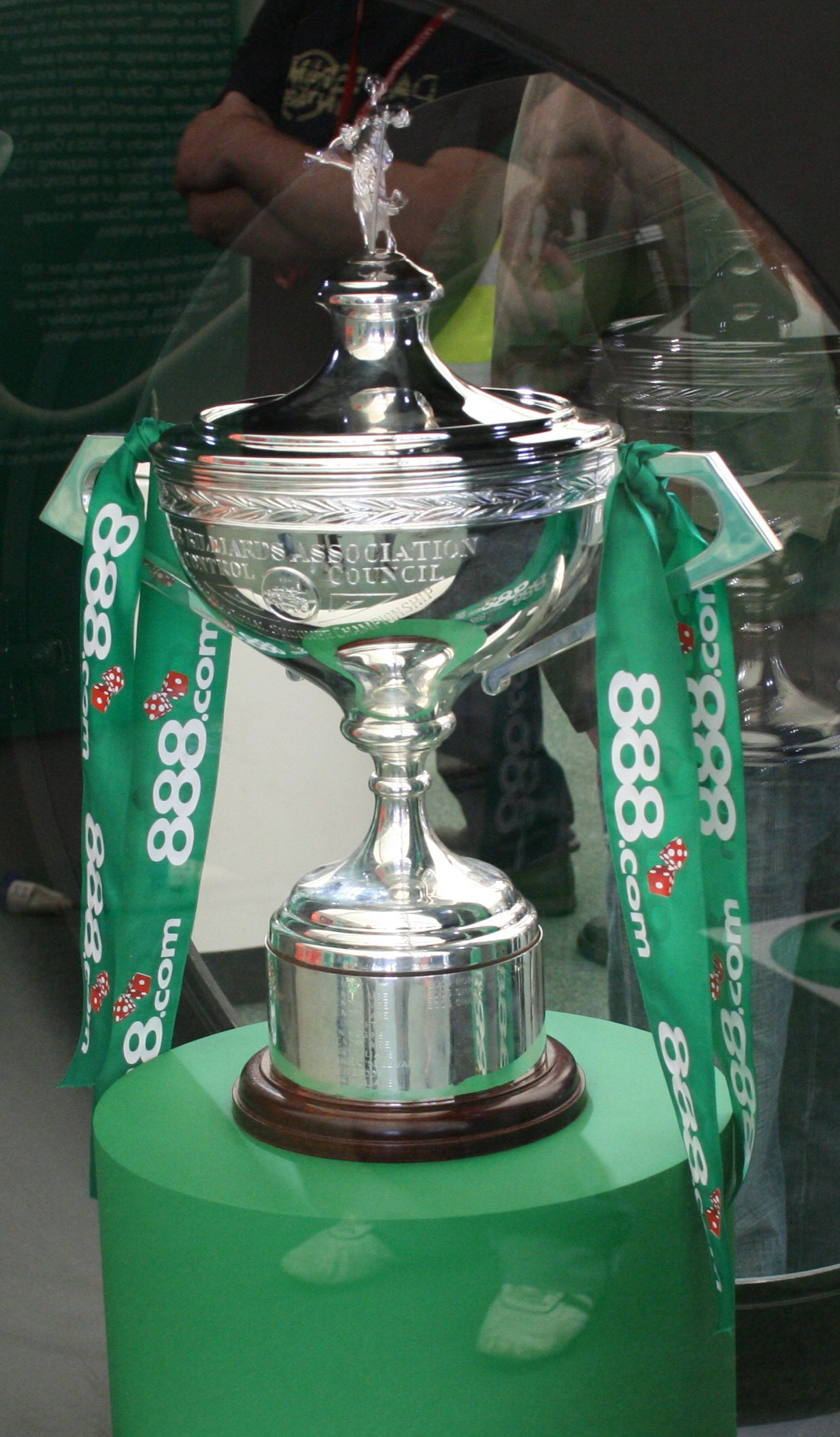
The World Snooker Championship trophy was presented to Walter Donaldson by John C. Bissett of the Billiards Association and Control Council.

The final, held at Leicester Square Hall, was postponed for several weeks due to building works. Previously known as Thurston's Hall, the venue had been bombed in October 1940 during the Blitz, and it finally re-opened on 3 October 1947. In the meantime, Donaldson continued practising. The match was played over 145 frames. Donaldson led Davis 4‍–‍2 and 7‍–‍5 after the initial two sessions. Later, from 19‍–‍35 behind, Davis won six consecutive frames to reduce his deficit to ten frames at 25‍–‍35. Donaldson secured victory at 73‍–‍49 and finished the match at 82–63. His tactics during the championship involved compiling breaks of around 30 to 50 points and playing safety rather than attempting difficult pots. Davis became frustrated by the lack of scoring chances left for him and missed a number of difficult pot attempts, thus allowing Donaldson opportunities to score and win frames. Although Donaldson won the title by defeating Davis 82‍–‍63, he had already reached the winning margin at 73‍–‍49. The championship trophy was presented by John C. Bissett, chairman of the BACC. After the final, Donaldson celebrated at the Albany Club, where he had won the 1946 Albany Club Professional Snooker Tournament the previous year.

Davis made the highest break of the tournament with a 135 clearance in frame 86 of the final, just one short of the championship record. Donaldson's break of 98 against Newman in the 20th frame of the quarter-final was his highest at the championship. There were three century breaks during the final, all made by Davis. Joe Davis commented after the match that, "Donaldson's long potting at present is the equal of anything seen in snooker history"; his brother Fred Davis said "[Donaldson] is playing the best snooker I have ever seen". In his book Talking Snooker, first published in 1979, Fred Davis reflected that he had been "perhaps overconfident" and had not expected Donaldson's standard to have improved so much as a result of his many hours of practice. This was the first of eight consecutive finals to feature the two players, between 1947 and 1954.

Joe Davis won two challenge matches against Donaldson after the 1947 championship, reinforcing the public perception that the 15-time champion Davis was still the best player.

== Main draw ==
The results for the main draw are shown below. Match winners are denoted in bold.

**Quarter-finals**; 71/73 frames
**Fred Davis (ENG)**	**53**
Clark McConachy (NZL)	20
**Sidney Smith (ENG)**	**43**
Alec Brown (ENG)	28
**Walter Donaldson (SCO)**	**46**
Stanley Newman (ENG)	25
**Horace Lindrum (AUS)**	**39**
Albert Brown (ENG)	34

**Semi-finals**; 71 frames
(England) **Fred Davis**	**39**
(England) Sidney Smith	32
(Scotland) **Walter Donaldson**	**39**
(Australia) Horace Lindrum	32

**Final**; 145 frames
(England) Fred Davis	63
(Scotland) **Walter Donaldson**	**82**

=== Final ===
Final: 145 frames. Leicester Square Hall, London, 13–18, 20–25 October 1947.
**Walter Donaldson**; Scotland	**82**–63	Fred Davis; England
Day 1: 42–**88**, **65**–49, **77**–29, 23–**91**, **65**–51, **70**–21, 26–**72**, **62**–43, 13–**113**, **66**–60, 40–**86**, **85**–36; Day 2: **88**–31, **84**–22, 33–**50**, **71**–32, 49–**71**, **65**–35, 63–**65**, **80**–36, **73**–56, 32–**86**, **87**–48, 34–**96**; Day 3: **73**–44, **95**–14, **64**–50, **89**–31, **79**–23, 28–**63**, **70**–38, **59**–40, 30–**55**, **62**–47, 28–**82** (**55**), 38–**86**; Day 4: **80**–20, 52–**82**, **83**–43, 13–**144** (**73**), **65**–36, **69**–24, **99**–24 (**97**), **100**–24, **112**–5, **78**–45, 47–**77**, **62**–61; Day 5: **65**–53, 12–**112**, **84**–33, **77**–24, **83**–37, 25–**94**, 31–**84**, 50–**71**, 56–**82**, 37–**64**, 22–**89**, 32–**80**; Day 6: **85**–18, **72**–45, 21–**88**, **60**–46, **94**–38, **70**–39, **72**–31, **90**–11, **87**–28, 46–**70**, 29–**79**, **74**–51; Day 7: **63**–41, **116**–8, **96**–24, 8–**111** (**103**), **65**–59, **68**–61, 16–**106**, 26–**85**, 19–**119** (**107**), 56–**69**, **89**–42, **97**–12; Day 8: **53**–44, 0–**139** (**135**), **97**–32, 51–**63**, **67**–37, 39–**96**, **57**–36, **90**–28, 32–**75**, **103**–6, 65–**73**, 22–**103**; Day 9: 40–**67**, **67**–55, 30–**94**, **72**–59, **82**–21, 20–**86**, **95**–51, **119**–31, 51–**93**, 14–**94**, 55–**64**, 12–**120**; Day 10: 51–**56**, **111**–20, **95**–31, **88**–23, **91**–6, **86**–36, 28–**80**, **57**–55, **73**–53, 24–**86**, **65**–55, **101**–26; Day 11: **68**–66, **95**–48, **77**–38, 66–**67**, **68**–23, **76**–50, **72**–53, **74**–40, 44–**82**, 43–**79**, 4–**114**, 31–**78**; Day 12: (one frame score is unknown) 55–**65**, 18–**92**, **77**–47, 23–**96**, 26–**75**, **93**–21, 18–**93**, 26–**84**, 6–**112**, 46–**82**, **104**–33, **96**–20
"Dead" frames were played. Donaldson won the match at 73–49.

== Qualifying ==
Herbert Holt had withdrawn from the qualifying in early December. The first match, between John Pulman and Albert Brown was a repeat of the final of the 1946 English Amateur Championship which Pulman had won. Brown led 14–9 after two days and took a winning 18–9 lead on the final day. Herbert Francis led Willie Leigh 14–10 after two days. Leigh levelled the score at 15–15 after the final afternoon session and eventually won 19–16. Sydney Lee beat Jim Lees 19–16 in the third match. In the last first-round match Kingsley Kennerley won easily against Conrad Stanbury, taking an 18–4 lead on the second evening.

Willie Leigh won all six frames of the first session, and all but frame nine in the second session, to establish an 11–1 lead against Sydney Lee. On the second day, he confirmed a win by taking the 19th frame with a break of 63, for a winning margin of 17–2. Kennerley reached a decisive margin of victory at 18–10 against Mann. In the semi-finals, Albert Brown secured his place in the last frame of the second day of his match against Barrie, at 18–6, and Kennerley prevailed 18–9 against Leigh. Brown won the contest of the Birmingham-based players at 18–10, which meant he was scheduled to play Lindrum in the quarter-finals of the main competition.

=== Qualifying results ===
Results of the qualifying competition were as follows:

Round 1; 35 frames
Albert Brown (ENG)	21
John Pulman (ENG)	14
Eric Newman (ENG)	w/o
Herbert Holt (ENG)	w/d
Kingsley Kennerley (ENG)	23
Conrad Stanbury (CAN)	12
Jim Lees (ENG)	16
Sydney Lee (ENG)	19
Willie Leigh (ENG)	19
Herbert Francis (ENG)	16

Round 2; 35 frames
(England) Albert Brown	28
(England) Eric Newman	7
(England) John Barrie	25
(England) Fred Lawrence	10
(England) Kingsley Kennerley	23
(England) Alec Mann	12
(England) Sydney Lee	10
(England) Willie Leigh	25

Round 3; 35 frames
(England) Albert Brown	24
(England) John Barrie	11
(England) Kingsley Kennerley	21
(England) Willie Leigh	14

Round 4; 35 frames
(England) Albert Brown	21
(England) Kingsley Kennerley	14
