= 1948 Sunday Empire News Tournament =

Professional snooker tournament

Sunday Empire News Tournament
Tournament information
- Dates: 11 October – 18 December 1948
- Venue: Leicester Square Hall
- City: London
- Country: England
- Format: Non-Ranking event
- Total prize fund: £1000
- Winner's share: £450
- Highest break: (England) Fred Davis (139)

Final
- Champion: (England) Joe Davis
- Runner-up: (England) John Pulman

The 1948 Sunday Empire News Tournament was a professional snooker tournament sponsored by the Sunday Empire News newspaper. Joe Davis won the event, with John Pulman finishing in second place. The tournament saw the re-introduction of the popular round-robin handicap format that had been used for the Daily Mail Gold Cup tournament before World War II. The home of the Daily Mail Gold Cup, Thurston's Hall, had re-opened in late 1947 when it was renamed the Leicester Square Hall. This was the only edition of the Sunday Empire News Tournament, although the same format was used for the News of the World Snooker Tournament from 1949 onwards.

In the final match of the tournament, Fred Davis, who was playing without a points handicap, beat his brother Joe 36–35. This was the first time that Joe had lost a competitive match when playing on level terms; however, under the "sealed handicap" aspect of the event, he received two frames and won the match 37–36.

== Format ==
The tournament was conceived by Ted Lowe, the manager of Leicester Square Hall. He suggested that Fred Davis, who was writing for the Empire News at the time approach the paper with the idea, and they agreed to sponsor the tournament with £1,000 prize money. The event was a round-robin snooker tournament and was played from 11 October to 18 December 1948. All matches were played at Leicester Square Hall in London. The competitors were Joe Davis, Fred Davis, Walter Donaldson, Sidney Smith and John Pulman. Each match lasted six days and was the best of 71 frames. There was a qualifying competition prior to the main event. This involved 5 players in a round-robin tournament with the winner, John Pulman, advancing to the main event.

The event had two handicapping aspects. In each match a handicap could be given to one of the players, a given number of points start in each frame. In addition there was a sealed handicap for each match. This was an additional adjustment to be made after each match (a specific number of frames) which was kept secret until the end of the match. For the points aspect of the handicapping, Joe Davis, Fred Davis and Walter Donaldson didn't give or receive points when they played each other but gave points to the other two players. Joe and Fred gave 7 points to Sidney Smith and 16 points to John Pulman. Donaldson gave 14 points to Pulman while Smith gave 10 points to Pulman.

== Results ==
Joe Davis beat Sidney Smith 49–25 in the opening match. Fred Davis beat John Pulman 39–32 in their match, having won 8 of the 11 frames on the final day, but Pulman received 9 frames in the sealed handicap and won the match 41–39. Pulman received 8 frames in the sealed handicap in his next match against Joe Davis but Joe, aware that a substantial handicap was likely to be given, had beaten Pulman 51–20. Fred and Joe Davis met In the final match. Fred won all six frames on the third evening to lead 20–16. Fred still led 31–29 at the start of the final day and eventually won the match 36–35. When the sealed handicap was opened it revealed that Joe received 2 frames and that he had won 37–36.

Joe Davis scored his 300th century break in the first match against Sidney Smith, making 119 on 14 October. On 10 November Fred Davis in his match against John Pulman made a break of 139, just one short of the record of 140 made by Joe Davis on 9 February 1948. Fred had been unable to get on the black off the 14th red and had taken the pink instead. On 15 December, during the final match, Fred Davis made a break of 138, winning the frame 138–0, and then, in the next frame made a break of 84, winning that frame 129–0. Two days later Joe Davis almost beat his own record of 140. On 123, he missed the blue when a 141 break was possible.

Winner	Score	Score before handicap	Loser	Dates
Joe Davis	49–25	49–22	Sidney Smith (7)	11–16 October
John Pulman (14)	44–33	38–33	Walter Donaldson	18–23 October
Fred Davis	40–35	40–31	Sidney Smith (7)	25–30 October
Joe Davis	44–32	44–27	Walter Donaldson	1–6 November
John Pulman (16)	41–39	32–39	Fred Davis	8–13 November
Walter Donaldson	w/o–w/d		Sidney Smith	15–20 November
Joe Davis	51–28	51–20	John Pulman (16)	22–27 November
Fred Davis	40–34	40–31	Walter Donaldson	29 November–4 December
John Pulman (10)	52–21	50–21	Sidney Smith	6–11 December
Joe Davis	37–36	35–36	Fred Davis	13–18 December

The "Score" column include frames received in the sealed handicap. Figures in brackets are the points handicap received per frame. Smith conceded his match against Donaldson before the start. He was suffering from tonsillitis.

Table

Pos	Player	Pld	Pts	F	A	Prize
1	(England) Joe Davis	4	8	181	121	£450
2	(England) John Pulman	4	6	165	144	£250
3	(England) Fred Davis	4	4	155	147	£150
4	(Scotland) Walter Donaldson	4	2	99	128	?
5	(England) Sidney Smith	4	0	81	141	?

John Pulman won an additional £150 for winning the qualifying competition.

== Qualifying ==
The qualifying tournament was played from 30 August to 2 October 1948. These matches were also played at Leicester Square Hall in London but each match only lasted three days and was the best of 35 frames. 5 players competed with the winner advancing to the final stages, The 5 players were: John Barrie, Albert Brown, Kingsley Kennerley, Sydney Lee and John Pulman. Players received points handicaps and sealed frame handicaps in the same way as in the main event. John Pulman won the qualifying with 6 points from his 4 matches ahead of Kingsley Kennerley with 5 points. Sydney Lee needed to win the last match against Albert Brown but he lost 22–15. Lee had beaten Pulman in the first match of the tournament. Lee received a 5-point lead in each frame but Pulman had won the match 18–17. Lee, however, had been given 2 frames in the sealed handicap to win 19–18.
