= 1952/1953 News of the World Snooker Tournament =

News of the World Tournament
Tournament information
- Dates: 8 September 1952 – 17 January 1953
- Venue: Leicester Square Hall
- City: London
- Country: United Kingdom
- Format: Non-Ranking event
- Total prize fund: £1500
- Winner's share: £500

Final
- Champion: (England) Joe Davis
- Runner-up: (Northern Ireland) Jackie Rea

The 1952/1953 News of the World Snooker Tournament was a professional snooker tournament sponsored by the News of the World. The tournament was won by Joe Davis who won all of 8 matches. He finished ahead of Jackie Rea who won 5 matches. The News of the World Snooker Tournament ran from 1949/50 to 1959.

== Format ==
The 1952/53 event was a round-robin snooker tournament and was played from 8 September 1952 to 17 January 1953. All matches were played at Leicester Square Hall in London. There were 9 competitors and a total of 36 matches. The competitors were Joe Davis, Fred Davis, Walter Donaldson, John Barrie, Albert Brown, Alec Brown, John Pulman, Jackie Rea and Sidney Smith. Jackie Read had won the qualifying event. Each match lasted three days and was the best of 37 frames.

Each match was separately handicapped. Joe Davis played level with Fred Davis and gave Walter Donaldson 10, Albert Brown and John Pulman 14, Sidney Smith 17, John Barrie and Alec Brown 18 and Jackie Rea 21. Fred Davis gave Walter Donaldson, Albert Brown and Sidney Smith 7, Alec Brown 12, John Pulman 14, John Barrie 18 and Jackie Rea 21. Walter Donaldson played level with Sidney Smith and gave Albert Brown 7, Alec Brown and John Pulman 10, John Barrie 12 and Jackie Rea 18. Sidney Smith played level with Albert Brown and John Pulman and gave Alec Brown 10, John Barrie 14 and Jackie Rea 18. Albert Brown gave John Pulman 5, Alec Brown 7, John Barrie 10 and Jackie Rea 16. John Pulman gave John Barrie and Alec Brown 7 and Jackie Rea 14. John Barrie played level with Alec Brown 7 and gave Jackie Rea 12. Alec Brown gave Jackie Rea 14.

== Results ==
Despite giving between 10 and 21 points each frame, Joe Davis won his first seven matches comfortably. Playing level with brother Fred in the last match Joe won 26–11 to finished undefeated. Jackie Rea, who received between 12 and 21 points in all his matches, finished second.

Joe Davis made a break of 122 on 5 December, in his match against John Pulman.

Winner	Score	Loser	Date
Alec Brown	24–13	John Pulman	8–10 September
Albert Brown	19–18	John Pulman	11–13 September
John Barrie	20–17	Albert Brown	15–17 September
Walter Donaldson	21–16	John Barrie	18–20 September
Joe Davis	22–15	Jackie Rea	22–24 September
Jackie Rea	32–5	Sidney Smith	25–27 September
Fred Davis	22–15	Alec Brown	29 September–1 October
Fred Davis	20–17	Walter Donaldson	2–4 October
Joe Davis	24–13	Walter Donaldson	6–8 October
Joe Davis	21–16	Sidney Smith	9–11 October
Jackie Rea	w/o–w/d	Albert Brown	13–15 October
Fred Davis	w/o–w/d	Albert Brown	16–18 October
Jackie Rea	25–12	Alec Brown	20–22 October
John Pulman	19–18	John Barrie	23–25 October
John Pulman	22–15	Sidney Smith	27–29 October
Fred Davis	21–16	Sidney Smith	30 October–1 November
Joe Davis	22–15	Alec Brown	3–5 November
John Barrie	20–17	Alec Brown	6–8 November
Walter Donaldson	20–17	Jackie Rea	10–12 November
Walter Donaldson	21–16	John Pulman	13–15 November
Albert Brown	22–15	Sidney Smith	17–19 November
Joe Davis	21–16	John Barrie	20–22 November
John Barrie	25–12	Fred Davis	24–26 November
Jackie Rea	22–15	Fred Davis	27–29 November
Alec Brown	20–17	Sidney Smith	1–3 December
Joe Davis	23–14	John Pulman	4–6 December
Joe Davis	27–10	Albert Brown	8–10 December
Alec Brown	20–17	Walter Donaldson	11–13 December
Jackie Rea	25–12	John Barrie	15–17 December
John Pulman	19–18	Jackie Rea	18–20 December
John Barrie	25–12	Sidney Smith	29–31 December
Albert Brown	19–18	Walter Donaldson	1–3 January
John Pulman	20–17	Fred Davis	5–7 January
Alec Brown	21–16	Albert Brown	8–10 January
Walter Donaldson	27–10	Sidney Smith	12–14 January
Joe Davis	26–11	Fred Davis	15–17 January

Table

Pos	Player	Pld	MW	FW	Prize
1	(England) Joe Davis	8	8	186	£500
2	(Northern Ireland) Jackie Rea	8	5	173	£300
3	(Scotland) Walter Donaldson	8	4	154	£200
4	(England) John Barrie	8	4	152	?
5	(England) Alec Brown	8	4	144	?
6	(England) John Pulman	8	4	141	?
7	(England) Fred Davis	8	4	137	?
8	(England) Albert Brown	8	3	139	?
9	(England) Sidney Smith	8	0	106	?

The positions were determined firstly by the number of matches won (MW) and, in the event of a tie, the number of frames won (FW). Albert Brown conceded his two matches scheduled for the week of 13 to 18 October. He played the first day of his match against Jackie Rea, trailing 10–2 but was then ill. Rea played a two-day exhibition match against John Pulman, while Fred Davis played a three-day exhibition match against Rex Williams, In the final table the matches were scored as 19–18 wins.

== Qualifying ==
The qualifying tournament was played from 5 May to 7 June 1952. These matches were also played at Leicester Square Hall in London. As in the main event, each match lasted three days and was the best of 37 frames. There were 5 competitors: Kingsley Kennerley, Jim Lees, Jackie Rea, Willie Smith and Rex Williams. The qualifying was won by Jackie Rea who advanced to the main event.

== Broadcasting ==
On 6 December the BBC showed two short, 30 minute, TV programmes of the final day of the match between Joe Davis and John Pulman. The commentators were Raymond Glendenning and Sidney Smith.
