= 1953 World Professional Match-play Championship =

Snooker tournament

Tournament information
- Dates: 10 November 1952 – 28 March 1953
- Final venue: Leicester Square Hall
- Final city: London
- Country: England
- Highest break: (England) John Pulman (133)

Final
- Champion: (England) Fred Davis
- Runner-up: (Scotland) Walter Donaldson
- Score: 37–34

Venues

The 1953 World Professional Match-play Championship was a professional snooker tournament, the second edition of the World Professional Match-play Championship, held from 10 November 1952 to 28 March 1953. The event was held across several venues in the United Kingdom, with the final held at the Leicester Square Hall in London, England. Fred Davis was the defending champion, after winning the 1952 event, with a 38–35 win over Walter Donaldson. The same players contested the 1953 final, with Davis defeating Donaldson 37–34 in the 71-frame final. The highest break of 133 was made by John Pulman in his semi-final loss to Davis.

== Overview ==
The World Professional Match-play Championship was created in 1952 as an alternative to the Billiards Association and Control Council (BA&CC) professional World Snooker Championship, which was retrospectively recognised as a world championship. However, founder and 15-time champion Joe Davis of the BA&CC's events did not participate in the Match-play Championships. The defending champion of the event was Davis' brother Fred Davis, who had won the World Snooker Championship as the BA&CC authorised event, and the match-play championship in 1952. Davis won his second World title by defeating Walter Donaldson 38–35 in the final.

=== Format ===
The 1953 World Professional Match-play Championship was held over several months between 10 November 1952 to 28 March 1953. The final was held at Leicester Square Hall in London, England from 23 to 28 March 1953. The event featured eight participants. The rounds were played at different locations in the United Kingdom over different match lengths. Matches were played as the best-of-61 frames in the quarter and semi-finals, and a best-of-73 frames final.

=== Schedule ===
Below is the list of venues and dates for the matches during the championships.

Match	Dates	Venue, City
Albert Brown v Alec Brown	10–15 November 1952	Central Billiards Hall, Slough
Fred Davis v John Barrie	8–12 December 1952	Mechanics Institute, Derby
John Pulman v Jackie Rea	8–12 December 1952	RAOB Hall, Belfast
Walter Donaldson v Kingsley Kennerley	15–20 December 1952	Bolton
Fred Davis v John Pulman	16–20 February 1953	Wrekin Hall, Wellington, Shropshire
Walter Donaldson v Albert Brown	9–14 March 1953	St George's Hall, Liverpool
Fred Davis v Walter Donaldson	23–28 March 1953	Leicester Square Hall, London

== Summary ==
The qualifying section was held at Leicester Square Hall from 25 August to 6 September 1952. 66-year-old Willie Smith met Jim Lees from 25 to 27 August. Smith led 16–8 after two days and won 21–14. The match between Kingsley Kennerley and Rex Williams was played from 28 to 30 August. Kennerley led 16–8 after two days and won 25–12. Smith and Kennerley met from 1 to 6 September in the six-day final. Kennerley led 27–21 after four days and took a winning 36–24 lead after the fifth day, winning all six of the evening session frames. The final score was 42–29.

Albert Brown and Alec Brown met in the first quarter-final, played in Slough, played over 6 days. Albert Brown took a 7–3 lead on the first day but Alec Brown had levelled the match at 15–15 after day 3. Albert Brown won all 5 frames on the fourth afternoon session and led 23–17 after four days. Alec Brown reduced Albert Brown's lead to 26–24 after day 5 but won only 2 frames on the last day as Albert secured a 35–26 win.

Defending champion Fred Davis played John Barrie at the Mechanics Institute in Derby. Davis led 20–16 after three days, making a break of 121 on day 3, but Barrie levelled the match at 24–24 on the fourth day, where he made a century break. On the final day, Davis led 28–26 after the afternoon session, despite a break of 125 by Barrie, and Davis eventually won 32–29.

John Pulman met Jackie Rea in the five-day match played at the RAOB Hall, Belfast. This was the first World Championship match to be played in Ireland. Pulman had the best of the first four days and led 29–19, needing just two frames on the final day for victory. Pulman won the match by taking a 31–21 after winning the fourth afternoon frame on the final day. The match ended with Pulman completing a 36–25 victory.

Walter Donaldson met Kingsley Kennerley, the winner of the qualifying competition, in the final quarter-final played in Bolton. Donaldson dominated the match, leading 27–8 after the fourth afternoon session. Kennerley won all five frames in the evening session, but Donaldson took a winning lead of 31–14 after the fifth afternoon. The match ended with Donaldson 42–19 ahead.

Fred Davis met John Pulman in the first semi-final played at the Wrekin Hall in Wellington, Shropshire. Davis took a winning 31–17 lead after the fourth day. The final score was 36–25. In the final afternoon session Davis made a break of 101 while Pulman made a 105 break and the highest break of the championship - a 133 - in the evening, and finished 36–25. Albert Brown withdrew from his semi-final match against Walter Donaldson in Liverpool before the second day's play, on medical advice, but was trailing 1–9 after the first day.

The final was held at Leicester Square Hall for the first time since 1949, the last time the final was held there and was held over 71 frames. The match was level at 6–6 after the first day but Donaldson took a 13–11 lead after day 2, despite a break of 107 by Davis. Donaldson led 20–16 after day 3 but Davis tied the match at 24–24 after the fourth day which included another Davis century, this time of 102. David led 28–26 after the fifth afternoon session but Donaldson took a 31–29 lead at the end of the fifth day. The match was again level at 33–33 after the final afternoon session but Davis crept ahead in the evening session to win 37–34.

== Main draw ==
The draw for the competition is below. Players in bold denote match winners.

**Quarter-finals**; 61 frames		**Semi-finals**; 61 frames		**Final**; 71 frames
(England) **Fred Davis**	**32**
(England) John Barrie	29	(England) **Fred Davis**	**36**
(England) **John Pulman**	**36**	(England) John Pulman	25
(Northern Ireland) Jackie Rea	25			(England) **Fred Davis**	**37**
(Scotland) **Walter Donaldson**	**42**			(Scotland) Walter Donaldson	34
(England) Kingsley Kennerley	19	(Scotland) **Walter Donaldson**	**w/o**
(England) **Albert Brown**	**35**	(England) Albert Brown	w/d
(England) Alec Brown	26

== Qualifying Tournament ==
The draw for the qualifying competition is below. Players in bold denote match winners.

**Round 1**; 37 frames
(England) **Willie Smith**	**21**
(England) Jim Lees	14
(England) **Kingsley Kennerley**	**25**
(England) Rex Williams	12

**Final**; 71 frames
(England) Willie Smith	29
(England) **Kingsley Kennerley**	**42**
