= 1946 Albany Club Professional Snooker Tournament =

Invitational snooker tournament

Tournament information
- Dates: 8 July – 20 September 1946
- Country: England
- Format: Non-ranking event
- Total prize fund: £500

Final
- Champion: Walter Donaldson (SCO)
- Runner-up: Alec Brown (ENG)
- Score: 20–11

The 1946 Albany Club Professional Snooker Tournament was an invitational snooker tournament held at the Albany Club in London between 8 July 1946 and 20 September 1946, featuring the eleven players that had been eliminated before the final in the 1946 World Snooker Championship. Walter Donaldson won the title, defeating Alec Brown 20–11 in the final.

== Tournament details ==
The tournament was promoted by, and held at, the Albany Club in Savile Row, London, in 1946. The invited players were the eleven who were eliminated before the final in the 1946 World Snooker Championship, with the draw for the even being made on 21 June 1946 in the presence of players and representatives from the press and BBC. There was a prize fund of £500.

There were three first round matches each contested over two days as the best-of-21 frames, starting on 8 July 1946 when Conrad Stanbury played Alec Brown. Brown took a 7–3 lead, and won 13–8. The following week, Fred Davis defeated Sydney Lee 14–7. Lee, taking penicillin during the first session due to painful boils on his arm, had taken a 3–2 lead before Davis finished the first day 6–4 ahead. Stanley Newman and Fred Lawrence were level at 5–5 after the first day, with Newman winning 11–8 when the pair did not play the final two scheduled frames.

In the quarter-finals, Kingsley Kennerley received a bye when John Barrie withdrew due to illness. Donaldson led Herbert Holt 4–1 and 8–2, and progressed 14–7. Brown eliminated Willie Leigh 13–8 after the first day had finished at 5–5. Davis defeated Lawrence 14–7, after their first day had ended with Davis leading 6–4.

Brown converted a 6–4 overnight lead into a 14–7 win over Kennerley in the first semi-final. Donaldson also had a 6–4 overnight lead in his semi-final, against Fred Davis, and also won 14–7.

On the first day of the final, played as the best-of-31 frames, Donaldson took an 8–2 lead over Brown. By the end of the second day, Donaldson had won the 16 frames he needed for victory, whilst Brown had won 4 frames. Donaldson compiled an 80 break on the last day and led 18–7 before the match concluded at 20–11.

A further tournament, where handicaps were applied, was held at the Albany Club in 1950. It was won by Brown, receiving 38 points start in each frame, who defeated Joe Davis 16–9 in the final. Brown had earlier eliminated Donaldson 15–8 in the second round, receiving 30 points start in each frame.

== Results ==
First round Best-of-21 frames
Conrad Stanbury (CAN) | 8
Alec Brown (ENG) | 13
Fred Davis (ENG) | 14
Sydney Lee (ENG) | 7
Stanley Newman (ENG) | 11
Fred Lawrence (ENG) | 8

Quarter-finals; Best-of-21 frames
Kingsley Kennerley (ENG) | Bye
John Barrie (ENG)
Willie Leigh (ENG) | 8
Alec Brown (ENG) | 13
Herbert Holt (ENG) | 7
Walter Donaldson (SCO) | 14
Fred Davis (ENG) | 14
Fred Lawrence (ENG) | 7

Semi-finals; Best-of-21 frames
Kingsley Kennerley (ENG) | 7
Alec Brown (ENG) | 14
Walter Donaldson (SCO) | 14
Fred Davis (ENG) | 7

Final; Best-of-31 frames
Alec Brown (ENG) | 11
Walter Donaldson (SCO) | 20
