= 1952 World Snooker Championship =

Snooker tournament, held 1952

Tournament information
- Dates: 25 February – 8 March 1952
- Venue: Houldsworth Hall
- City: Manchester
- Country: England
- Organisation: BACC

Final
- Champion: Horace Lindrum (AUS)
- Runner-up: Clark McConachy (NZL)
- Score: 94–49

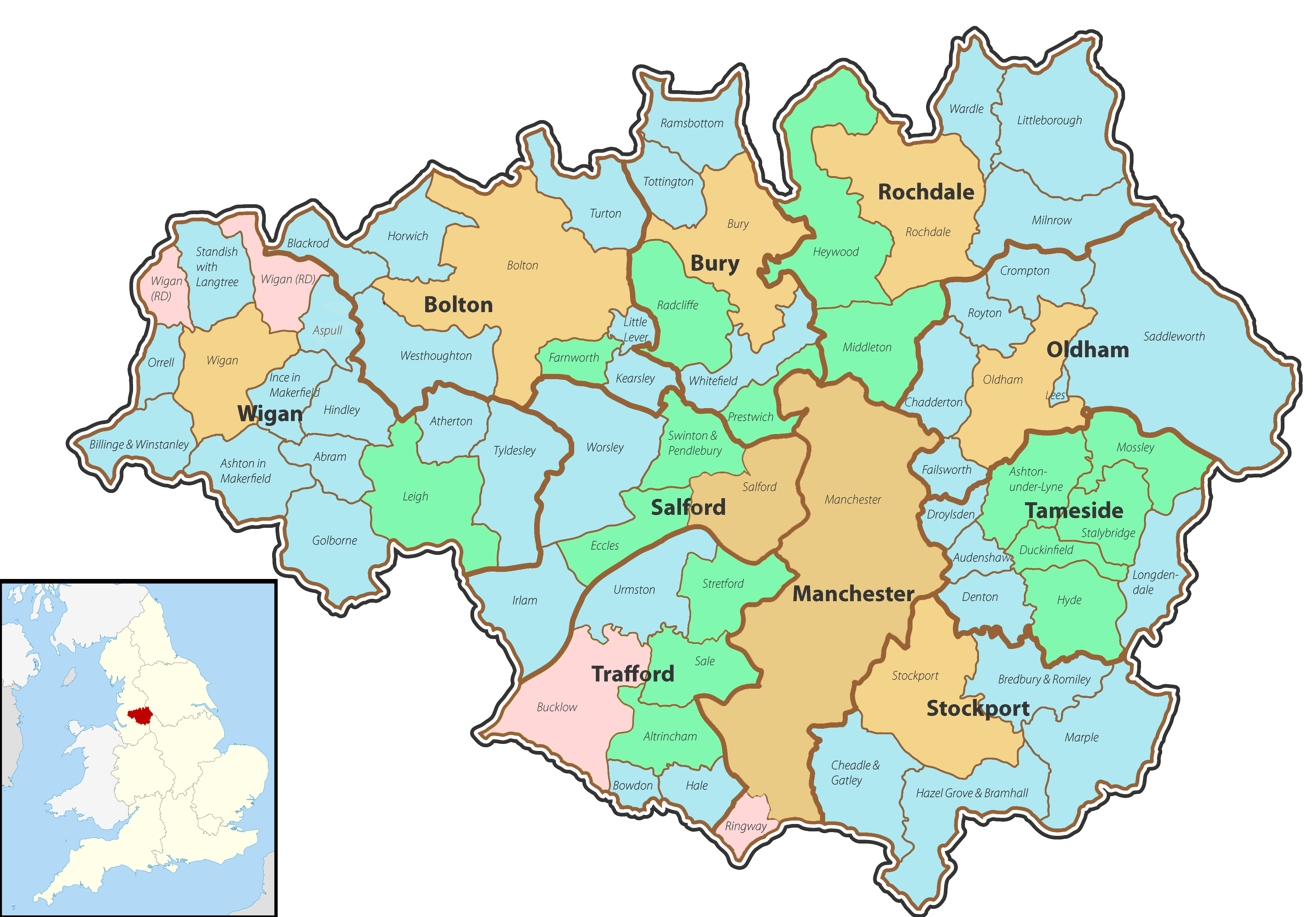
Location within Manchester

The 1952 World Snooker Championship was a snooker tournament held between 25 February and 8 March 1952 at Houldsworth Hall, in Manchester, England. The event featured only two entrants – Australian Horace Lindrum and New Zealander Clark McConachy. Due to a dispute between the Professional Billiards Players' Association (PBPA) and the Billiards Association and Control Council (BACC), most players withdrew from the event. The BACC thought the championship was primarily about honour, and financial consideration should come second, whilst the PBPA disagreed. The PBPA established an alternative 'world championship' called the PBPA Snooker Championship which would later become the official world championship as the World Professional Match-play Championship.

The competition was played as one continual match, held over 145 frames. Lindrum won the match, taking a winning 73–37 lead early on the 10th day and won 94–49. In winning the event, Lindrum became the first player from outside Britain and Ireland to gain victory in the tournament. The status of the event is debated, with some historians not considering Lindrum a true World Champion due to the field of just two players.

== Background ==
The World Snooker Championship is an annual cue sport tournament and is the official world championship of the game of snooker. The first world championship in 1927, held in Camkin's Hall, Birmingham, England, was won by Joe Davis. Due to a dispute between the Professional Billiards Players' Association (PBPA) and the organisers for the event, the Billiards Association and Control Council (BACC), most players withdrew. The BACC thought the championship was primarily about honour, and financial consideration should come second, whilst the PBPA disagreed. The PBPA went on to create the World Professional Match-play Championship, where the remaining players would take part, and would be retroactively given status as the world championship for following years.

With just two participants remaining – Horace Lindrum and Clark McConachy – the tournament was contested over a single match. The pair met in a best of 145 frame match, held between 25 February and 8 March 1952 at the Houldsworth Hall in Manchester, England.

McConachy had played in the 1951/1952 News of the World Snooker Tournament from September 1951 to January 1952. This was an annual round-robin handicap tournament played by the leading professionals. McConachy was defeated in each of the eight games he played in and winning an average of 11 frames in each 37-frame match. He also lost all three matches he played on level terms, 10–27 to Albert Brown, 8–29 to John Pulman, and 11–26 to Sidney Smith. He lost 11–26 to Joe Davis, despite receiving a 21-point start in each frame.

On 19 February, the Tuesday before the final, McConachy had scored one of the early snooker maximum breaks in a practice frame at the Beaufort Club in London. An official of the BACC later examined the table and found it slightly over the standard size and so the break was not accepted as official. At the time, Joe Davis held the record for the highest official break of 146. Lindrum did not play in the News of the World tournament. His last competitive tournament was the 1951 World Snooker Championship, in which he had lost to Walter Donaldson in the semi-final, trailing 25–36 on the final day.

== Summary ==
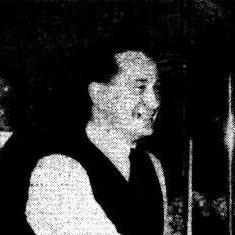
Horace Lindrum (pictured in 1947) won the event, the first non-British player to do so.

With the score tied at 6–6 after the first day, Lindrum won eight of the next twelve frames to lead 14–10 after the second day's play. This lead extended to 22–14 after the third day. All 12 frames were shared on day four, with each player winning six, but Lindrum still led 28–20. The fifth day saw featured Lindrum extend his lead to 38–22 after day five, winning ten of the twelve frames played. Lindrum led 44–28 at the end of the first full week of play.

Lindrum won eight frames on the eighth day of play to lead 52–32, before winning nine frames the following day to leave him 61–35 ahead. With the score required for victory being 73 frames, Lindrum won 10 frames on 5 March to lead 71–37, needing just two of the remaining 37 frames for victory. Lindrum won the first two frames to reach a winning 73–37 position on 6 March. The remaining 35 dead frames were due to be played, although in the end only a total of 143 frames were played, Lindrum winning 94–49. Lindrum became the first player from outside Britain to win the World Championship, and would remain the only non-United Kingdom winner until the Canadian Cliff Thorburn won the event in 1980.

== Main draw ==
Final; 145 frames
(Australia) Horace Lindrum	94
(New Zealand) Clark McConachy	49
