= 1957/1958 News of the World Snooker Tournament =

News of the World Tournament
Tournament information
- Dates: 14 October 1957 – 15 March 1958
- Venue: various
- Format: Non-Ranking event
- Total prize fund: £1500
- Highest break: Walter Donaldson (141)

Final
- Champion: (England) Fred Davis
- Runner-up: (England) John Pulman

The 1957/1958 News of the World Snooker Tournament was a professional snooker tournament sponsored by the News of the World. The tournament was won by Fred Davis who won 4 of his 5 matches, ahead of John Pulman. Pulman also won 4 matches but Davis won more frames overall. The News of the World Snooker Tournament ran from 1949/50 to 1959.

== Format ==
The 1957/1958 event was a round-robin snooker tournament and was played from 14 October 1957 to 15 March 1958. Matches were played at various locations around the United Kingdom and also on Jersey. There were 6 competitors and a total of 15 matches. The competitors were the same as in the previous two seasons, Joe Davis, Fred Davis, Walter Donaldson, John Pulman, Jackie Rea and Rex Williams. Each match lasted three days and was the best of 37 frames.

Each match was separately handicapped. Joe Davis gave Fred Davis and John Pulman, a 10-point start each frame, Walter Donaldson 14, Jackie Rea 17 and Rex Williams 20. Fred Davis gave Walter Donaldson 12, Jackie Rea 14 and Rex Williams 18. John Pulman gave Jackie Rea 14 and Rex Williams 18. Walter Donaldson gave Jackie Rea 7 and Rex Williams 10 while Jackie Rea gave Rex Williams 5 points. The handicaps in the Fred Davis/Pulman and Pulman/Donaldson matches are not known.

== Results ==
Walter Donaldson made a break of 141 in his opening match against Joe Davis.

Winner	Score	Loser	Date	Venue	Ref
Walter Donaldson	21–16	Joe Davis	14–16 October	Burroughes Hall, London	
Rex Williams	22–15	Jackie Rea	17–19 October	Burroughes Hall, London	
Fred Davis	21–16	Rex Williams	4–6 November	Smethwick, Birmingham	
Rex Williams	23–14	Walter Donaldson	7–9 November	Smethwick, Birmingham	
Joe Davis	19–18	Rex Williams	11–13 November	Burroughes Hall, London	
John Pulman	21–16	Walter Donaldson	14–16 November	Burroughes Hall, London	
John Pulman	20–17	Jackie Rea	18–20 November	Ipswich	
Fred Davis	22–15	Joe Davis	21–23 November	Ipswich	
Fred Davis	22–15	John Pulman	2–4 December	Jersey	
Walter Donaldson	21–16	Jackie Rea	5–7 December	Jersey	
John Pulman	19–18	Rex Williams	13–15 January	Newcastle	
Fred Davis	20–17	Jackie Rea	16–18 January	Newcastle	
Walter Donaldson	21–16	Fred Davis	21–23 January	Liverpool	
Joe Davis	24–13	Jackie Rea	10–12 March	Houldsworth Hall, Manchester	
John Pulman	23–14	Joe Davis	13–15 March	Houldsworth Hall, Manchester	

Table

Pos	Player	Pld	MW	FW
1	(England) Fred Davis	5	4	101
2	(England) John Pulman	5	4	98
3	(Scotland) Walter Donaldson	5	3	93
4	(England) Rex Williams	5	2	97
5	(England) Joe Davis	5	2	88
6	(Northern Ireland) Jackie Rea	5	0	78

The positions were determined firstly by the number of matches won (MW) and, in the event of a tie, the number of frames won (FW).

== Broadcasting ==
The BBC showed a short, 35 minute, TV programme of the final day of the final match from Houldsworth Hall, Manchester. The commentator was Sidney Smith.
