= 1955/1956 News of the World Snooker Tournament =

News of the World Tournament
Tournament information
- Dates: 31 October 1955 – 18 February 1956
- Venue: various
- Format: Non-Ranking event
- Total prize fund: £1500
- Winner's share: £500

Final
- Champion: (England) Joe Davis
- Runner-up: (England) Fred Davis

The 1955/1956 News of the World Snooker Tournament was a professional snooker tournament sponsored by the News of the World. The tournament was won by Joe Davis who won 4 of his 5 matches. He finished ahead of Fred Davis who had also won 4 matches but Joe won more frames overall. The News of the World Snooker Tournament ran from 1949/50 to 1959.

== Format ==
The 1955/56 event was a round-robin snooker tournament and was played from 31 October 1955 to 18 February 1956. Matches were played at various locations around the United Kingdom and also on Jersey. There were 6 competitors and a total of 15 matches. The competitors were Joe Davis, Fred Davis, Walter Donaldson, John Pulman, Jackie Rea and Rex Williams. Each match lasted three days and was the best of 37 frames.

Each match was separately handicapped. Joe Davis played level with Fred Davis and gave John Pulman, Walter Donaldson and Jackie Rea 14 points and Rex Williams 16. Fred Davis gave John Pulman 10, Walter Donaldson and Jackie Rea 12 and Rex Williams 16. John Pulman played level with Walter Donaldson and gave Jackie Rea 7 and Rex Williams 10. Walter Donaldson gave Jackie Rea 7 and Rex Williams 12, Jackie Rea gave Rex Williams 10 points.

== Results ==
Winner	Score	Loser	Date	Venue	Ref
Fred Davis	23–14	Rex Williams	31 October–2 November	Blackpool	
Walter Donaldson	21–16	John Pulman	3–5 November	Blackpool	
Rex Williams	20–17	Walter Donaldson	7–9 November	Newcastle	
Fred Davis	20–17	John Pulman	10–12 November	Newcastle	
Walter Donaldson	20–17	Joe Davis	5–7 December	Liverpool	
John Pulman	22–15	Rex Williams	8–10 December	Liverpool	
Jackie Rea	22–15	Rex Williams	12–14 December	Jersey	
John Pulman	20–17	Jackie Rea	15–17 December	Jersey	
Joe Davis	21–16	Jackie Rea	16–18 January	Blackpool	
Fred Davis	20–17	Walter Donaldson	19–21 January	Blackpool	
Joe Davis	21–16	John Pulman	23–25 January	Burroughes Hall, London	
Walter Donaldson	23–14	Jackie Rea	26–28 January	Burroughes Hall, London	
Fred Davis	28–9	Jackie Rea	9–11 February	Manchester	
Joe Davis	33–4	Rex Williams	13–15 February	Manchester	
Joe Davis	23–14	Fred Davis	16–18 February	Manchester	

Table The final standings were as follows.

Pos	Player	Pld	MW	FW	FL	Prize
1	(England) Joe Davis	5	4	115	70	£500
2	(England) Fred Davis	5	4	105	80	?
3	(Scotland) Walter Donaldson	5	3	98	87	?
4	(England) John Pulman	5	2	91	94	?
5	(Northern Ireland) Jackie Rea	5	1	78	107	?
6	(England) Rex Williams	5	1	68	117	?

The positions were determined firstly by the number of matches won (MW) and, in the event of a tie, the number of frames won (FW).
