= 1958 News of the World Snooker Tournament =

News of the World Tournament
Tournament information
- Dates: 6 October – 15 November 1958
- Venue: Burroughes Hall
- City: London
- Country: United Kingdom
- Format: Non-Ranking event
- Winner's share: £400
- Highest break: Fred Davis (ENG) (114)

Final
- Champion: (England) Fred Davis
- Runner-up: (England) Joe Davis

The 1958 News of the World Snooker Tournament was a professional snooker tournament sponsored by the News of the World. The tournament was won by Fred Davis who won 7 of his 9 matches, beating his brother Joe in all their three matches. Joe won 5 matches and finished in second place ahead of John Pulman by winning more frames overall. The News of the World Snooker Tournament ran from 1949/50 to 1959.

== Format ==
There were four competitors: Joe Davis, Fred Davis, John Pulman and Walter Donaldson. Rather than 3-day matches of 37 frames, matches were over 13 frames on a single day with each playing the others three times. Originally the tournament was planned to take place over three consecutive weeks but the third week of matches were delayed for three weeks. Unlike previous News of the World tournaments there was no handicapping. All matches were played in Burroughes Hall, London.

The highest break of the competition was a 114 compiled by Fred Davis in his match against Pulman on 10 October. Davis also made the only other century break of the tournament, a 100 against Joe Davis on 18 October.

== Results ==
Winner	Score	Loser	Date	Ref
Joe Davis	11–2	John Pulman	6 October	
Fred Davis	7–6	Joe Davis	7 October	
Fred Davis	9–4	Walter Donaldson	8 October	
Joe Davis	8–5	Walter Donaldson	9 October	
John Pulman	8–5	Fred Davis	10 October	
John Pulman	7–6	Walter Donaldson	11 October	
John Pulman	7–6	Walter Donaldson	13 October	
Joe Davis	9–4	Walter Donaldson	14 October	
Joe Davis	9–4	John Pulman	15 October	
John Pulman	7–6	Fred Davis	16 October	
Fred Davis	10–3	Walter Donaldson	17 October	
Fred Davis	9–4	Joe Davis	18 October	
Fred Davis	9–4	Walter Donaldson	10 November	
John Pulman	9–4	Walter Donaldson	11 November	
Joe Davis	8–5	John Pulman	12 November	
Walter Donaldson	7–6	Joe Davis	13 November	
Fred Davis	10–3	John Pulman	14 November	
Fred Davis	7–6	Joe Davis	15 November	

Table

Pos	Player	Pld	MW	FW	Prize
1	(England) Fred Davis	9	7	72	£400
2	(England) Joe Davis	9	5	57	£375
3	(England) John Pulman	9	5	52	£325
4	(Scotland) Walter Donaldson	9	1	43	£175

The positions were determined firstly by the number of matches won (MW) and, in the event of a tie, the number of frames won (FW).
