= News of the World Tournament =

News of the World Tournament may refer to:

- News of the World Match Play, a golf tournament
- News of the World Snooker Tournament, a snooker tournament
- News of the World Darts Championship, a darts tournament
