= News of the World Snooker Tournament =

Former English snooker competition

News of the World Tournament
Tournament information
- Venue: Burroughes Hall
- Location: London
- Country: England
- Established: 1949/50
- Organisation(s): World Professional Billiards and Snooker Association
- Format: Non-ranking event
- Final year: 1959
- Final champion: (England) Joe Davis

The News of the World Snooker Tournament was one of the leading professional tournaments of the 1950s, widely considered as more important than the world championship due to the involvement of Joe Davis. The event was sponsored by the Sunday newspaper News of the World. The highest break of the tournament was 140 or more on four occasions, which was unusual at that time.

There were three distinct periods in the tournament's history. The first six editions, from 1949/50 to 1954/55, were held at Leicester Square Hall in London. The event was played on a round-robin basis and used a handicap system. Matches were played over three days as the best of 37 frames. The total prize money was £1,500 with £500 awarded to the winner. There were initially eight competitors, and later nine, requiring 28 or 36 matches to be played. With two matches played per week, this meant that the tournament extended over 14 or 18 weeks, although it was somewhat longer because of the Christmas break.

After the closure of Leicester Square Hall in January 1955, the tournament was held at a variety of venues around England and Jersey from 1955/56 to 1957/58. The number of competitors was reduced to six, meaning that only 15 matches had to be played. Generally, two matches were played over the course of one week at each of the selected venues in turn, but otherwise the format of the tournament remained unchanged.

The format changed again in late 1958. All matches were held at Burroughes Hall in London but the number of competitors was further reduced to four. Instead of a best-of-37-frame match, each competitor played the others in three separate 13-frame matches, and there were no handicaps. With only six matches to be played, two per week, the tournament was completed in three weeks. The first prize was £400. The final edition, in late 1959, was also played at Burroughes Hall. It used the Snooker Plus rules, with three competitors playing 25-frame matches and was again completed in three weeks.

== History ==
The first edition of the tournament was held between September 1949 and January 1950 using a similar format to the 1948 Sunday Empire News Tournament but without the "sealed handicap" aspect. Four players were involved in a qualifying competition, the winner joining seven others in the main event. The eight competitors in the main event were Joe Davis, Walter Donaldson, George Chenier, Horace Lindrum, Sidney Smith, Peter Mans and Albert Brown who won the qualifying event. The 1949 World Snooker Champion, Fred Davis, did not enter because he objected to the matches being played over three days rather than the normal six. All matches were played over 37 frames and each player was given a handicap at the start of the tournament. Davis received a handicap of −7, Donaldson zero, Chenier 13, Lindrum 13, Smith 13, Pulman 14, Mans 16, and Brown 19. The player with the higher handicap received a start in every frame, his starting score being the difference between the two handicaps. Despite being the only player with a negative handicap, Joe Davis won six of his seven matches, and the tournament. Albert Brown had seemed the likely winner going into his last match, but he lost the match and eventually finished in third place behind Sidney Smith.

The 1959 tournament was played under the snooker plus format, a new variant with two additional colours (orange and purple), allowing a maximum break of 210. The format, which was developed by Joe Davis, made its professional debut at this tournament on 26 October at the Burroughes Hall in London. There were only three players in the competition, with Davis becoming champion after winning five of his six matches. The 'snooker plus' experiment was not a success; the format was abandoned and the tournament series discontinued.

== Winners ==
Year	Winner	Record	Runner-up	Venue	Season
News of the World Snooker Tournament
1949/50	(England) Joe Davis	6–1	(England) Sidney Smith	Leicester Square Hall in London	n/a
1950/51	(England) Alec Brown	7–0	(England) John Pulman	Leicester Square Hall in London	n/a
1951/52	(England) Sidney Smith	6–2	(England) Albert Brown	Leicester Square Hall in London	n/a
1952/53	(England) Joe Davis	8–0	(Northern Ireland) Jackie Rea	Leicester Square Hall in London	n/a
1953/54	(England) John Pulman	7–1	(England) Joe Davis	Leicester Square Hall in London	n/a
1954/55	(Northern Ireland) Jackie Rea	8–0	(England) Joe Davis	Leicester Square Hall in London	n/a
1955/56	(England) Joe Davis	4–1	(England) Fred Davis	various venues used	n/a
1956/57	(England) John Pulman	5–0	(England) Fred Davis	various venues used	n/a
1957/58	(England) Fred Davis	4–1	(England) John Pulman	various venues used	n/a
1958	(England) Fred Davis	7–2	(England) Joe Davis	Burroughes Hall in London	n/a
News of the World Snooker Plus Tournament
1959	(England) Joe Davis	5–1	(England) Fred Davis	Burroughes Hall in London	n/a
