= Clark McConachy =

New Zealand snooker and billiard player (1895–1980)

Clark McConachy MBE
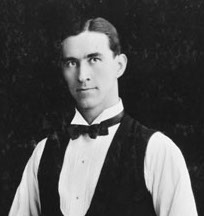

Personal information
- Nickname: Mac
- Born: 15 April 1895 Glenorchy, New Zealand
- Died: 12 April 1980 (aged 84) Auckland, New Zealand

Sport
- Sport: Snooker

- World Billiards Champion: 1951

Clark McConachy MBE (15 April 1895 – 12 April 1980), often known simply as Mac, was a New Zealand professional player of English billiards and snooker.

== Life and career ==
McConachy was born at Glenorchy in Otago in 1895. He was the New Zealand professional billiards champion from 1914 until 1980.

He was runner-up in the Professional Billiards Championship to Joe Davis in 1932, and became champion in 1951 by defeating John Barrie 9,274-6,691. He also held the title unchallenged from 1951 until 1968, when at the age of 73 and afflicted by Parkinson's disease, he was narrowly defeated 5,234-5,499 by Rex Williams. His highest break at billiards was 1,943.

He was the runner-up in the World Snooker Championships of 1932 (losing to Davis, as he did in that year's world billiards championship) and 1952. McConachy scored one of the early snooker maximum breaks. He achieved it on Tuesday 19 February 1952 in a practice frame against Pat Kitchen at the Beaufort Club in London on a table reserved for professionals. An official of the Billiards Association and Control Council later examined the table and found it slightly over the standard size and so the break was not accepted as official. At the time Joe Davis held the record for the highest official break of 146. The match between McConachy and Horace Lindrum for the World Championship started the following Monday.

McConachy was a keen advocate of physical fitness and regularly ran up to four miles every day. A strict teetotaller and non-smoker, he attributed his continued success well into his senior years to these things. He was also well known for walking around the table on his hands before the match started. He is a member of the New Zealand Sports Hall of Fame. In the 1964 Queen's Birthday Honours, he was appointed a Member of the Order of the British Empire, for community and charitable services. He died at his residence in the Auckland suburb of Greenlane on 12 April 1980.

== Snooker performance timeline ==
=== Pre-war ===
Tournament	1931/ 32	1932/ 33	1933/ 34	1934/ 35	1935/ 36	1936/ 37	1937/ 38	1938/ 39	1939/ 40
World Championship	F	A	A	A	A	A	A	A	A

=== Post-war ===
Tournament	1945/ 46	1946/ 47	1947/ 48	1948/ 49	1949/ 50	1950/ 51	1951/ 52
News of the World Snooker Tournament (Note: Round-robin handicap tournament.)	Tournament Not Held				A	A	9
World Championship	A	QF	SF	A	A	A	F

Performance Table Legend
F	lost in the final	SF	lost in the semi–finals	QF	lost in the quarter-finals
N	N = position in round-robin event	A	did not participate in the tournament		

== World championship finals ==
=== Billiards ===
‡ indicates challenge matches

Outcome	No.	Year	Championship	Opponent in the final	Score	Ref.
Runner-up	1.	1932	World Professional Championship of English Billiards	Joe Davis (ENG)	19,259–25,161	
Winner	1.	1951‡	World Professional Championship of English Billiards	John Barrie (ENG)	9,274–6,691	
Runner-up	2.	1968‡	World Professional Championship of English Billiards	Rex Williams (ENG)	5,234–5,499	

=== Snooker ===
Outcome	No.	Year	Championship	Opponent in the final	Score	Ref.
Runner-up	1.	1932	World Snooker Championship	Joe Davis (ENG)	19–30	
Runner-up	2.	1952	World Snooker Championship	Horace Lindrum (AUS)	49–94	
