= 1946 World Snooker Championship =

Professional snooker tournament

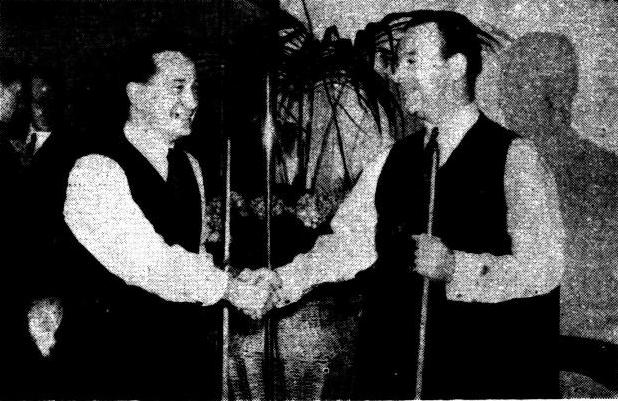
- Davis (right) and Lindrum shake hands before the final

Tournament information
- Dates: 4 February – 18 May 1946
- Final venue: Royal Horticultural Hall
- Final city: London
- Country: England
- Organisation: BACC
- Highest break: Joe Davis (ENG) (136)

Final
- Champion: Joe Davis (ENG)
- Runner-up: Horace Lindrum (AUS)
- Score: 78–67

The 1946 World Snooker Championship was a professional snooker tournament held from 4 February to 18 May 1946. Joe Davis won the title by defeating Horace Lindrum by 78 frames to 67 in the final, although the winning margin was reached at 73–62. It was Davis's fifteenth championship win, maintaining his unbeaten record in the tournament since its first edition in 1927. The highest break of the event was 136, a new championship record, compiled by Davis in the final.

The competition was organised by the Billiards Association and Control Council. The final was held at the Royal Horticultural Hall in London, England, from 6 to 18 May. Other matches took place at various venues in the UK. The qualifying competition (known as the "B Section") took place from 7 January to 16 February, and the quarter-finals and semi-finals were staged from 4 February to 9 March. Davis retired from the competition following his victory.

== Background ==
The World Snooker Championship is a professional tournament and the official world championship of the game of snooker. The sport was developed in the late 19th century by British Army soldiers stationed in India. Professional English billiards player and billiard hall manager Joe Davis noticed the increasing popularity of snooker compared to billiards in the 1920s, and with Birmingham-based billiards equipment manager Bill Camkin, persuaded the Billiards Association and Control Council (BACC) to recognise an official professional snooker championship in the 1926–27 season. In 1927, the final of the first professional snooker championship was held at Camkin's Hall; Davis won the tournament by beating Tom Dennis in the final. The annual competition was not titled the World Championship until the 1935 tournament, but the 1927 tournament is now referred to as the first World Snooker Championship. Davis had also won the title every year from 1928 to 1940, after which the tournament was not held again until 1946 due to World War II.

The BACC's official magazine, The Billiard Player, reported in August 1945 that "It is expected by the beginning of next year that the majority of professional players will be free from their [military] Service duties, and it should therefore be possible to run the official championships about March." In the October 1945 issue, it was announced that entries for the competition would close at noon on 31 October, with a stake fee of £20 required. All matches except the final were to be of 31 frames, played across three days, at venues arranged by the players involved. The final would be played over 73 frames at a location determined by the BACC, expected to last one week, but with the organisers having the option to extend the duration to two weeks.

== Summary ==
The Championship attracted a total of 14 entries; a total of 13 were originally announced, with Fred Lawrence being added a few days later. Entries were divided into a qualifying group (Section B), the winner joining seven others in the main draw (Section A).

=== Quarter-finals ===
Joe Davis and Walter Donaldson met in Wellington, Shropshire from 4 to 6 February 1946. Davis led 6–4 and 12–8 after the first two days. He took a winning lead during the final afternoon session at 16–9. The final score was 21–10. Davis made a break of 129 in frame 29. From 18 to 20 February, Stanley Newman, the winner of the qualifying competition, faced Sydney Lee at the Clifton Hotel in Blackpool. Newman led 6–4 and 12–8 after the first two days. He won four of the five frames on the final afternoon session to lead 16–9. The final score was 19–12.

Fred Davis played Alec Brown from 7 to 9 March, in the second match to be played at the Clifton Hotel. Davis won the first nine frames and led 9–1 overnight. He built a 15–5 lead after two days, to require only one further frame for victory. Davis won frame 21 to win the match 16–5. The final score was 24–7. Horace Lindrum defeated Herbert Holt 17–14 in the last quarter-final match, played in Streatham, London, from 4 to 6 March. Lindrum was 6–4 in front after the first day, and won four consecutive frames to go from 6–6 to 10–6, finishing the second day at 11–9.

=== Semi-finals ===
The semi-finals were held in Oldham. Joe Davis met Newman in the first match, from 4 to 6 March. Davis led 6–4 after the first day, making a break of 106 in the eighth frame and a break of 102. He extended his lead to 13–7 after the second day and won the match 21–10.

From 7 to 9 March, Lindrum and Fred Davis played in the second semi-final. Lindrum took a 7–3 lead on the first day. Davis reduced his deficit to two frames on the next day, leaving Lindrum 11–9 ahead. Davis levelled the match at 11–11 but Lindrum won the next three frames to lead 14–11. In the evening session Lindrum took two of the first three frames to achieve a winning 16–12 lead. The final score was 17–14.

=== Final ===
The final was played from 6 to 18 May 1946 at the Horticultural Hall, London. There were two sessions, starting at 3:00 pm and 7:30 pm, scheduled each day (except on 12 May when there was no play). The referee was T. Bradlaugh Leng, and Joyce Gardner was the compere. There were 1,250 spectator tickets available for each session, at prices ranging from 5 shillings to 1 guineas. Davis's preparations for the match included physical exercises under the supervision of his wife June Malo, a former army physical training instructor, and he stopped driving as he felt it affected his hands' steadiness. He told the Daily Mirror that "All that bending down to the table can play hell with your system if you are not prepared for it."

After the first day of the final Joe Davis led Lindrum 7–5. Lindrum, however, claimed the first three frames of the third session to lead 8–7, before Davis responded by winning the last three frames and regaining the lead at 10–8, and finishing the day leading 14–10. Lindrum reduced his deficit to two frames at the end of the third day, and trailed only 17–19. Davis however regained the four frame lead a day later at 26–22, and maintained it at the end of the fifth day by 32–28. Davis than won seven of the next twelve frames to gain a six frame lead at 39–33, and maintained it over the next three days leading 45–39, 51–45 and 57–51, before gaining a 10 frame advantage at 65–55. He maintained this lead at the end of the penultimate day, and at 71–61 only needed two frames to retain the title. Davis then won 78–67, although the winning margin was already reached at 73–62, Davis made an unprecedented six century breaks in the final, including championship records of 133 and 136. He only needed 7 minutes, 15 seconds for the record 133 break, which was also Davis' 200th century break. Davis won one frame 145–0, which at the time was the highest aggregate score ever recorded in one frame. Over the tournament Davis made ten century breaks.

Davis said after the match that he was relieved that the contest had finished, and that "It has been a great strain. Over the match I have lost five pounds in weight." Lindrum wrote in 1974 that although he had been disappointed to lose the final, "I still enjoyed it and I had been a part of what I still consider to be the greatest final in the history of the game."

Tickets for the final sold well, with full audience attendances at sessions, and gate receipts for the match totalled £11,487.60, (equivalent to £415,972 in 2025). Davis and Lindrum received £1,800 and £550 respectively in prize money. Lindrum also received the championship table and all the equipment. Live radio broadcasts were transmitted in the UK and in Australia, with commentary from Gardner and Willie Smith. During one of the Australian programmes, Gardner was the commentator when Davis made the first century break to be broadcast live.

This was the 15th and last championship victory for Davis, who having achieved his ambition to hold the title for 20 years and retire undefeated, announced that he would not participate in future world championships.

== Schedule ==
1946 World Snooker Championship schedule
Match	Dates	Venue, city	Ref.
Joe Davis v Walter Donaldson	4–6 February 1946	Wellington, Shropshire	
Stanley Newman v Sydney Lee	18–20 February 1946	Clifton Hotel, Blackpool	
Fred Davis v Alec Brown	21–23 February 1946	Clifton Hotel, Blackpool	
Horace Lindrum v Herbert Holt	4–6 March 1946	Smith Meters Rifle and Social Club, Streatham, London	
Joe Davis v Stanley Newman	4–6 March 1946	Oldham	
Horace Lindrum v Fred Davis	7–9 March 1946	Oldham	
Joe Davis v Horace Lindrum	6–11, 13–18 May 1946	Royal Horticultural Hall, London	

== Main draw ==
Match results are shown below. Winning players and scores are denoted in bold text.

**Quarter-finals**; 31 frames		**Semi-finals**; 31 frames		**Final**; 145 frames
**Joe Davis (ENG)**	**21**
Walter Donaldson (SCO)	10	(England) **Joe Davis**	**21**
Sydney Lee (ENG)	12	(England) Stanley Newman	10
**Stanley Newman (ENG)**	**19**			(England) **Joe Davis**	**78**
**Horace Lindrum (AUS)**	**17**			(Australia) Horace Lindrum	67
Herbert Holt (ENG)	14	(Australia) **Horace Lindrum**	**17**
**Fred Davis (ENG)**	**24**	(England) Fred Davis	14
Alec Brown (ENG)	7

== Final ==
Final: 145 frames. Royal Horticultural Hall, London, 6–11, 13–18 May 1946. Referee: T. Bradlaugh Leng.
**Joe Davis**; England	**78**–67	Horace Lindrum; Australia
Day 1: **55**–54, 28–**92**, **98**–29 (**51**), **94**–60, **82**–34, 54–**62**, 33–**73**, **82**–34 (**59**), **71**–17, 50–**59**, **61**–59, 55–**72**; Day 2: 60–**71**, 0–**125** (**59**), 42–**78** (**66**), **79**–29, **62**–36, **125**–11 (**61**), **83**–27, **91**–31, 70–**71**, **89**–19, **62**–47, 37–**94** (**56**); Day 3: **59**–31, 56–**61**, **114**–15 (**104**), 41–**77**, 57–**66**, 52–**55**, 48–**80** (**53**), **86**–15 (**52**), **65**–39, 44–**92**, 61–**62** (Davis 61), **66**–33; Day 4: **80**–27, **69**–40, 37–**70**, **88**–49 (**50**), **108**–25 (**56**), 58–**69**, **155**–4 (**133**), **108**–25 (**74**), 35–**92**, 53–**72**, **76**–31, 38–**71**; Day 5: 51–**77**, **72**–35, 22–**110**, **105**–25 (**58**), 50–**78**, 23–**89**, **114**–0 (**63**), **104**–36, **96**–33 (**62**), **103**–26, 25–**73**, 52–**74**; Day 6: **85**–27 (**55**), 28–**82**, 37–**80**, 35–**69**, 17–**97**, **136**–0 (**136**), **98**–26 (**84**), **57**–56, **117**–13 (**107**), **61**–50, **94**–25 (**94**), 8–**86**; Day 7: **103**–8, **61**–47, 47–**72**, **68**–51, 53–**63**, 21–**103**, 44–**86** (**54**), **103**–15, 53–**65**, 34–**79**, **77**–55, **96**–30; Day 8: **96**–23 (**61**), 13–**103**, **108**–26 (**75**), **79**–45 (**55**), 26–**65**, 43–**89**, **63**–44, **103**–48, 36–**83** (**50**), 59–**69** (Davis 59), **103**–24 (**83**), 40–**87**; Day 9: **69**–50, 48–**55**, **98**–36 (**83**), 22–**111**, **82**–47, **80**–44 (**76**), **87**–45 (**87**), **64**–38, 28–**93**, 54–**72**, 44–**73**, 51–**64**; Day 10: **79**–33, **75**–21, 47–**56**, **82**–37, **82**–58 (**76**), **70**–50 (**52**), 27–**67**, **75**–45, 10–**106** (**53**), **89**–25 (**77**), **91**–25, 43–**82**; Day 11: 55–**84** (Davis 53), **80**–24, **99**–31 (**67**), 35–**73**, **79**–52 (**66**), 20–**93** (**60**), **67**–49, **80**–53, 6–**93**, **122**–0 (**122**), 42–**87** (**58**), 28–**97**; Day 12: **86**–54, 28–**105**, **91**–27, 20–**77**, 44–**67**, **72**–59 (**Davis 58**), **145**–0 (**116**), **99**–15, **85**–29, 47–**55**, **96**–23 (**83**), 26–**109** (**86**), 48–**54**
Joe Davis achieved a winning margin at 73–62. Dead frames were played.

== Qualifying Tournament ==
Kingsley Kennerley met Fred Lawrence from 7 to 9 January at the Delicia Stadium, Gosta Green. The opening day's play was littered with foul shots according to David Williams in the Daily Herald, who wrote that the match was watched by "a handful of people in a freezing disused cinema". Kennerley secured a winning margin at 16–6. Stanley Newman and Willie Leigh played at the St John Ambulance Hallin Newquay, Cornwall from 10 to 12 January, with Newman winning in the deciding frame. Conrad Stanbury played John Barrie from 28 to 30 January in Woolwich, London.

In the semi-finals of the qualifying, Tom Reece retired with the score at 2–8 after the first day, 17 January, of his match at Wellington, Shropshire with Kennerley, and Newman defeated Stanbury 17–14 in their match held from 11 to 13 February in Tooting, London. The final between Newman and Kennerley was played from 14 to 16 February in Tooting. Newman won all eleven frames played on the third day, and achieved a winning margin at 16–10 to qualify for the main draw.

Match results are shown below. Winning players and scores are denoted in bold text.

**Round 1**; 31 frames		**Round 2**; 31 frames		**Final**; 31 frames
**Stanley Newman (ENG)**	**16**
Willie Leigh (ENG)	15	**Stanley Newman (ENG)**	**17**
**Conrad Stanbury (CAN)**	**18**	Conrad Stanbury (CAN)	14
John Barrie (ENG)	13			(England) **Stanley Newman**	**21**
**Kingsley Kennerley (ENG)**	**22**			(England) Kingsley Kennerley	10
Fred Lawrence (ENG)	9	**Kingsley Kennerley (ENG)**	**w/o**
		Tom Reece (WAL)	w/d

== Century breaks ==
- 136, 133, 129, 122, 116, 107, 106, 104, 102 – Joe Davis
- 102 – Stanley Newman
- 100 – Walter Donaldson
