= 1952 World Professional Match-play Championship =

Tournament information
- Dates: 12 November 1951 – 15 March 1952
- Final venue: Tower Circus
- Final city: Blackpool
- Country: England
- Organisation: Professional Billiard Players' Association
- Highest break: Fred Davis (140)

Final
- Champion: Fred Davis (ENG)
- Runner-up: Walter Donaldson (SCO)
- Score: 38–35

Venues

The 1952 World Professional Match-play Championship was a snooker tournament held from 12 November 1951 to 15 March 1952, with the final taking place at the Tower Circus in Blackpool, England. The event was created following a dispute between the Professional Billiard Players' Association (PBPA) and the Billiards Association and Control Council (BACC). The BACC claimed that the championship was primarily about honour, and financial consideration should come behind this, whilst the PBPA members felt that the BACC was taking too large a share of the income from the events and established an alternative 'world championship' called the World Professional Match-play Championship, editions of which are now recognised as world championships.

Fred Davis won his fourth world title by defeating Walter Donaldson by 38 frames to 35 in the final. Davis recorded the highest break of the tournament, 140, a new championship record.

== Background ==
The World Snooker Championship, established in 1927, is a professional tournament and the official world championship of the game of snooker. The sport was developed in the late 19th century by British Army soldiers stationed in India. Professional English billiards player and billiard hall manager Joe Davis noticed the increasing popularity of snooker compared to billiards in the 1920s, and with Birmingham-based billiards equipment manager Bill Camkin, persuaded the Billiards Association and Control Council (BACC) to recognise an official professional snooker championship in the 1926–27 season. In 1927, the final of the first professional snooker championship was held at Camkin's Hall; Davis won the tournament by beating Tom Dennis in the final. The annual competition was not titled the World Championship until 1935, but the 1927 tournament is now referred to as the first World Snooker Championship. Davis also won the title each year until 1940, when the contest was cancelled during World War II, and again when the championship resumed in 1946, accumulating a total of 15 titles before retiring from the event.

In 1952, the World Professional Match-play Championship was created following a dispute between the Professional Billiards Players' Association (PBPA) and the BACC. In response to player complaints that the BACC was taking too large a percentage of income from the tournament, the BACC claimed that the championship "has always been, and in theory is to be, regarded as an affair of honour and a test of merit", and that "every effort is made to arrange terms advantageous to the professionals competing in the championship, compatible with securing an equitable return for the promoters of it, the B.A.& C.C." The PBPA members established an alternative competition called the World Professional Match-play Championship, perceived in general as the genuine title competition, and now recognised as world championships. Only two of the leading professional players, Horace Lindrum and Clark McConachy, had declined to join the PBPA, and they were the only two entrants to the BACC's 1952 World Snooker Championship. Lindrum won their match, and therefore the title, 94–49 after dead frames. The other professionals at the time, with the exception of Joe Davis who had retired from world title competitions, entered the PBPA's tournament.

Ten players entered the PBPA's first World Professional Match-play Championship. The two finalists in the 1951 World Snooker Championship, Fred Davis and Walter Donaldson, were given byes to the semi-final stage in opposite halves of the draw. The remaining eight played two rounds to determine the other two semi-finalists.

== Summary ==
=== First round ===
Sydney Lee withdrew, granting Kingsley Kennerley a walkover into the quarter-finals. Jackie Rea defeated Jim Lees 33–28 in their match from 12 to 17 November 1951, Albert Brown scored a 33–28 win over John Pulman when they met from 27 November to 1 December, and in a match from 17 to 22 December, Alec Brown achieved a winning margin at 33–17 before his last day's play against Rex Williams, finishing at 39–22. Williams had turned professional in 1951, becoming the first player to make the transition from being an amateur since Pulman and Brown had done so in 1946. Snooker historian Clive Everton wrote that Williams was "hammered" by Brown, and that this demonstrated the gulf in ability between the top amateurs and the professionals of the time.

=== Quarter-finals ===
In the first quarter final, held from 7 to 11 January 1952, Kennerley took a 4–1 lead over Rea, who had won the first frame. At the end of the first day they were tied at 6–6. Rea then took ten of the next day's twelve frames to lead 16–8, and on subsequent days was 23–13, 25–17 and 29–19 ahead, eventually finishing the match at 35–26.

In the other quarter-final match, Albert Brown won six of the nine frames against Alec Brown on the first day of their match which lasted from 14 to 18 January. He won the opening six frames on the second day, and finished that day 18–6 ahead, maintaining a six frame lead at the end of the next day, which ended with him leading 24–12. Alec Brown reduced the deficit on the fourth day by winning eight of the twelve frames played, meaning Albert Brown led 28–20 going in to the last day. Albert Brown achieved a certain win at 31–22, and after the remaining scheduled frames were played, he was 36–25 ahead.

=== Semi-finals ===
The first semi-final, between Walter Donaldson and Albert Brown, was played in Scunthorpe from 21 to 25 January 1952. Donaldson held a 21–15 lead after three days. However, Brown reduced Donaldson's lead to two frames on the fourth day and the match ended 31–30.

The second semi-final, between Fred Davis and Jackie Rea, was played at Wellington, Shropshire from 4 to 9 February 1952. After four days Davis led 29–11. Davis took a winning 34–16 lead on the fifth day and eventually won 38–23.

=== Final ===
The final started on 10 March 1952 and continued until 15 March. In advance of the match, Davis and Donaldson issued a challenge to Horace Lindrum, who had effectively won the BACC-recognised 1952 World Snooker Championship by taking an insurmountable lead on 6 March, that the winner of their match would play him for £500 and gate receipts. Lindrum wrote in his 1974 book that he never received the challenge in writing, and that if he had, the principle that the title should be contested in an official tournament, apart from his existing commitments at the time which made it impractical, meant that he would not have agreed.

In the World Professional Match-play final, Davis won six of the eight frames in their first session, and each player won four frames in the second session, leaving the score at 7–5 to Davis after the first day. Donaldson had compiled a break of 104. Donaldson recorded another century break, 106, in the twentieth frame, but Davis increased his lead over Donaldson to 14–10 by the end of the second day. On the third day, Davis achieved a break of 140, a new world championship record, and Donaldson made a 111. Davis finished the day 21–15 ahead. After another day's play, Davis was 29–19 ahead, Donaldson won eight of the next twelve frames to reduce his arrears to six frames at 27–33. Davis won the title, finishing the last day at 38–35 after achieving a winning margin at 37–30. Davis was trailing by 8 points to 66 in the 67th frame, but compiled a clearance of 67 to take the frame and secure victory.

== Schedule ==
Schedule of matches for the 1952 World Professional Match-play Championship
Match	Dates	Venue, city	Ref.
Jackie Rea v Jim Lees	12–17 November 1951	Wellington, Shropshire	
Albert Brown v John Pulman	27 November–1 December 1951	Slough	
Alec Brown v Rex Williams	17–22 December 1951	Darlaston, Staffordshire	
Jackie Rea v Kingsley Kennerley	7–11 January 1952	South Shields	
Albert Brown v Alec Brown	14–18 January 1952	Derby	
Walter Donaldson v Albert Brown	21–25 January 1952	Scunthorpe	
Fred Davis v Jackie Rea	4–9 February 1952	Wellington, Shropshire	
Fred Davis v Walter Donaldson	10–15 March 1952	Tower Circus, Blackpool	

== Main draw ==
The result for the tournament are shown below. Players in bold denote match winners.

**Round 1**; 61 frames
**Jackie Rea (NIR)**	**33**
Jim Lees (ENG)	28
**Kingsley Kennerley (ENG)**	**w/o**
Sydney Lee (ENG)	w/d
**Albert Brown (ENG)**	**32**
John Pulman (ENG)	27
**Alec Brown (ENG)**	**39**
Rex Williams (ENG)	22

**Quarter-finals**; 61 frames
(Northern Ireland) **Jackie Rea**	**35**
(England) Kingsley Kennerley	26
(England) **Albert Brown**	**36**
(England) Alec Brown	25

**Semi-finals**; 61 frames
(England) **Fred Davis**	**38**
(Northern Ireland) Jackie Rea	23
(England) Albert Brown	30
(Scotland) **Walter Donaldson**	**31**

**Final**; 73 frames
(England) **Fred Davis**	**38**
(Scotland) Walter Donaldson	35
