= World Professional Match-play Championship =

Professional snooker tournament

Tournament information
- Location: Melbourne
- Country: Australia
- Established: 1952
- Organisation(s): PBSA/WPBSA
- Final year: 1976
- Final champion: Eddie Charlton (AUS)

The World Professional Match-play Championship was a professional snooker tournament established in 1952 as an alternative to the professional World Snooker Championship by some of the professional players, following a dispute with the Billiards Association and Control Council, the sport's governing body. Fred Davis won the first five editions of the tournament, but did not participate in 1957, when John Pulman won. After this, the event was discontinued due to a decline in the popularity of snooker.

A tournament with the same name was staged in 1976. Eddie Charlton promoted the event in Melbourne with World Professional Billiards and Snooker Association (WPBSA) approval. Charlton defeated Ray Reardon 31–24 in the final. The events from 1952 to 1957 are now regarded as editions of the world championships, but the 1976 one is not.

== Background and 1950s tournaments ==
Snooker was developed in the late 19th century by British Army soldiers stationed in India. Professional English billiards player and billiard hall manager Joe Davis had noticed the increasing popularity of snooker compared to billiards in the 1920s, and with Birmingham-based billiards equipment manager Bill Camkin, persuaded the Billiards Association and Control Council (BACC) to recognise an official professional snooker championship in the 1926–27 season. In 1927, the final of the first professional snooker championship was held at Camkin's Hall; Davis won the tournament by beating Tom Dennis in the final. The annual competition was not titled the World Championship until 1935, but the 1927 tournament is now referred to as the first World Snooker Championship.

In 1952, the World Professional Match-play Championship was created following a dispute between the Professional Billiards Players' Association (PBPA) and the BACC. In response to player complaints that the BACC was taking too large a percentage of income from the tournament, the BACC claimed that the championship "has always been, and in theory is to be, regarded as an affair of honour and a test of merit", and that "every effort is made to arrange terms advantageous to the professionals competing in the championship, compatible with securing an equitable return for the promoters of it, the B.A.& C.C." The PBPA members established an alternative competition which became known as the World Professional Match-play Championship, and which was perceived by most snooker followers as the genuine title competition. Editions of the World Professional Match-play Championship are now recognised as official world championships.

Only two of the leading professional players, Horace Lindrum and Clark McConachy, had declined to join the PBPA, and they were the only two entrants to the BACC's 1952 World Snooker Championship. Lindrum won their match, and therefore the title, 94-49 after dead frames. The other professionals at the time, with the exception of Joe Davis who had retired from world title competitions, entered the PBPA's 1952 World Professional Match-play Championship. There were ten participants, and the two finalists in the 1951 World Snooker Championship, Fred Davis and Walter Donaldson, were given byes to the semi-final stage in opposite halves of the draw. The remaining eight contenders played two rounds to determine the other two semi-finalists. Davis won the final against Donaldson, finishing the last day at 38–35 after achieving a winning margin at 37–30.

At the second edition, in 1953, Davis and Donaldson were again the finalists, and were level at 33–33 in the final, before Davis won 37–34. The pair also faced each other in the 1954 final, which Davis won 45–26. Even before losing the match, Donaldson declared that he would not enter the championship again, saying he could not give enough time to the practice he felt was necessary.

Davis retained the title in 1955, taking a decisive lead of 37–34 against John Pulman in the final, and 38–35 after the remaining dead frames were played. There were only four entries to the 1956 World Professional Match-play Championship, Pulman led 31–29 at the end of the penultimate day of the best-of-73-frames final, but Davis won five of the six frames in the afternoon session to lead 34–32 and added three of the first four frames in the evening to achieve a winning margin at 37–33. After dead frames, the final score was 38–35.

Having won the first five editions of the World Professional Match-play Championship, Davis didn't participate in 1957, which again attracted only four competitors. The 1957 tournament was held in Jersey and was won by Pulman, who defeated Jackie Rea 39–34 in the final. The only significant press coverage of the tournament was in the Jersey Evening Post. After this, the event was discontinued due to a decline in the popularity of snooker. There were no new players turning professional between Rex Williams in 1951 and John Spencer in 1967. Clive Everton wrote in 2019 that "only very few permutations could be made from such a limited cast of players. The contests between them were devoid of bite, variety, surprise or any sense of occasion or importance." The events from 1952 to 1957 are regarded as world championships by World Snooker, but later events with similar titles are not.

== 1976 World Professional Match-play Championship ==
The BACC announced in September 1969 that "The BA & CC and Professional Billiard Players Association have reached agreement regarding procedure for turning professional and other events governed by the BA & CC." However, following a dispute about the terms for a challenge match for the World Professional Billiards Championship, the PBPA disassociated itself from the BACC from 1 October 1970, and was renamed the World Professional Billiards and Snooker Association (WPBSA) on 12 December 1970. The 1976 World Professional Match-play Championship was promoted by professional player Eddie Charlton in Melbourne, with WPBSA approval. Charlton defeated Ray Reardon 31–24 in the final.

The WPBSA refused to sanction a similar event in 1977 but in April 1978 they did agree to an event to be played in Australia in March 1979. Mike Watterson, the promoter of the World Championship, expressed disapproval for the event since there had been some confusion over which was the authentic World championship. Charlton was unable to find a sponsor and the event was cancelled. Charlton made another attempt to organise the event in January 1981 but this again failed because of the lack of a sponsor.

== Similarly named events ==
In July 1968, Williams and Charlton played a match, sanctioned by the BACC, billed as the World Open Match Play Snooker Championship. It was a challenge by Charlton for the World Open Snooker Championship title won in 1967 by Williams.

In 1988, Barry Hearn promoted an invitational tournament, called the World Matchplay, for the top twelve players in the provisional rankings. It was held in the UK annually until 1992, and the 1988 event was the first snooker tournament to offer a six-figure winner's prize, £100,000.

== Finals ==
World Professional Match-play Championship finals
Year	Winner	Runner-up	Final score	Ref.
World Professional Match-play Championship (World Championship)
1952	Fred Davis (ENG)	Walter Donaldson (SCO)	38–35	
1953	Fred Davis (ENG)	Walter Donaldson (SCO)	37–34	
1954	Fred Davis (ENG)	Walter Donaldson (SCO)	45–26	
1955	Fred Davis (ENG)	John Pulman (ENG)	38–35	
1956	Fred Davis (ENG)	John Pulman (ENG)	38–35	
1957	John Pulman (ENG)	Jackie Rea (NIR)	39–34	
World Professional Match-play Championship
1976	Eddie Charlton (AUS)	Ray Reardon (WAL)	31–24	
