= Sidney Smith (snooker player) =

English billiards and snooker player

Personal information
- Born: 26 March 1908 Killamarsh, Derbyshire
- Died: 26 June 1990 (aged 82) Amersham, Buckinghamshire

Sport
- Country: England
- Sport: Snooker

Sidney Smith (26 March 1908 – 26 June 1990) was a professional billiards and snooker player from the 1930s to the 1950s. He was born in Killamarsh, Derbyshire, England. He moved with his parents to Doncaster when he was two, and stayed there until after he started playing cue sports professionally. The family had a full-size billiard table at home, and Smith started playing English billiards when he was 12, making his first century break when he was 14. When he was 19, he won the Yorkshire professional tournaments for both billiards and snooker.

He won the 1929 English Junior Championship, for professional players aged under 25, by defeating Joe Earlam 4,000-3,433. In 1929-30 he was employed by the cue sports company Burroughes and Watts to referee tournaments between leading players such as Walter Lindrum, Tom Newman and Willie Smith. He watched and learned from observing these players at close quarters. He played a series of matches against Smith in 1929-30, and made a break of 1,292 during one contest.

Smith was his opponent when he entered the 1936 World Snooker Championship, and although Sidney Smith led 15-10 in the best-of-31-frames match, his opponent took the last six frames to win. Sidney Smith was the first player to make a total clearance in snooker competition, a break of 133 on 11 December 1936 in the Daily Mail Gold Cup. This was a world record break, eclipsing the previous best of 119 which had been achieved by both Joe Davis and Horace Lindrum. In the 1937 World Championship he eliminated Alec Brown in the quarter finals, reaching a winning score at 16–11. The final score was 18–13. In the semi-finals he lost at 12–16, to Davis the final score being 18–13 after dead frames.

Smith was the runner-up to Joe Davis in the World Snooker Championships of 1938 (having beaten Joe's brother Fred 18–13 in the semi-final) and 1939, and he was a semi-finalist on four occasions in total, reaching that stage again in 1940, 1947, 1949.

Smith's most notable tournament wins were the 1948 United Kingdom Professional Billiards Championship (beating John Barrie 7000–6428) and the 1951/1952 News of the World Snooker Tournament.

Smith was the runner-up to Alec Brown in the 1938/1939 Daily Mail Gold Cup and later runner-up to Joe Davis in the 1949/50 News of the World Tournament and the 1950 Sporting Record Masters' Snooker Tournament.

Smith made three billiard breaks over 1,000 points in his career, with his highest being the 1,292 against Smith.

Smith died in 1990 aged 82.

== Performance timeline ==
Tournament	1935/ 36	1936/ 37	1937/ 38	1938/ 39	1939/ 40	1945/ 46	1946/ 47	1947/ 48	1948/ 49	1949/ 50	1950/ 51	1951/ 52	1952/ 53
Daily Mail Gold Cup (Note: Round-robin handicap tournament) (Note: Billiards event before 1936/37 season)	NH	5	5	2	7	Tournament Not Held							
Sunday Empire News Tournament	Tournament Not Held								5	Tournament Not Held			
News of the World Snooker Tournament	Tournament Not Held									2	6	1	9
Sporting Record Masters' Tournament	Tournament Not Held									2	Tournament Not Held		
World Championship	1R	SF	F	F	SF	A	SF	QF	SF	A	QF	A	NH (Note: Replaced by the World Professional Match-play Championship)

Performance Table Legend
LQ	lost in the qualifying draw	#R/N	lost in the early rounds of the tournament (N = position in round-robin event)	QF	lost in the quarter-finals
SF	lost in the semi-finals	F	lost in the final	W	won the tournament
DNQ	did not qualify for the tournament	A	did not participate in the tournament	WD	withdrew from the tournament

NH / Not Held	means an event was not held.

== Snooker (1 title) ==
No.	Event	Ref.
1.	1951/1952 News of the World Snooker Tournament	
