= Stanley Newman (snooker player) =

English snooker player (1900–1947)

Personal information
- Born: 1900 Bow, London, England
- Died: 11 June 1947 (aged 46) London, England

Sport
- Country: England
- Sport: Snooker
- Professional: 1936–1947

Stanley Edward Newman (1900 – 11 June 1947) was an English professional player of English billiards and snooker. He was born Stanley Edward Pratt in London. Stanley Newman was the younger brother of Tom Newman.

Newman twice reached the semi-final of the World Snooker Championship, in 1936 and 1946. In 1936 he reached the semi-final by default, having a bye into the last-8 stage and then his opponent, Tom Dennis had to withdraw after having an operation on his right eye. Newman also played in the 1947 World Snooker Championship.

Newman died of pneumonia in June 1947.
