= Burroughes Hall =

Historic place in Soho Square, London

Coordinates: 51°30′57″N 0°7′54″W

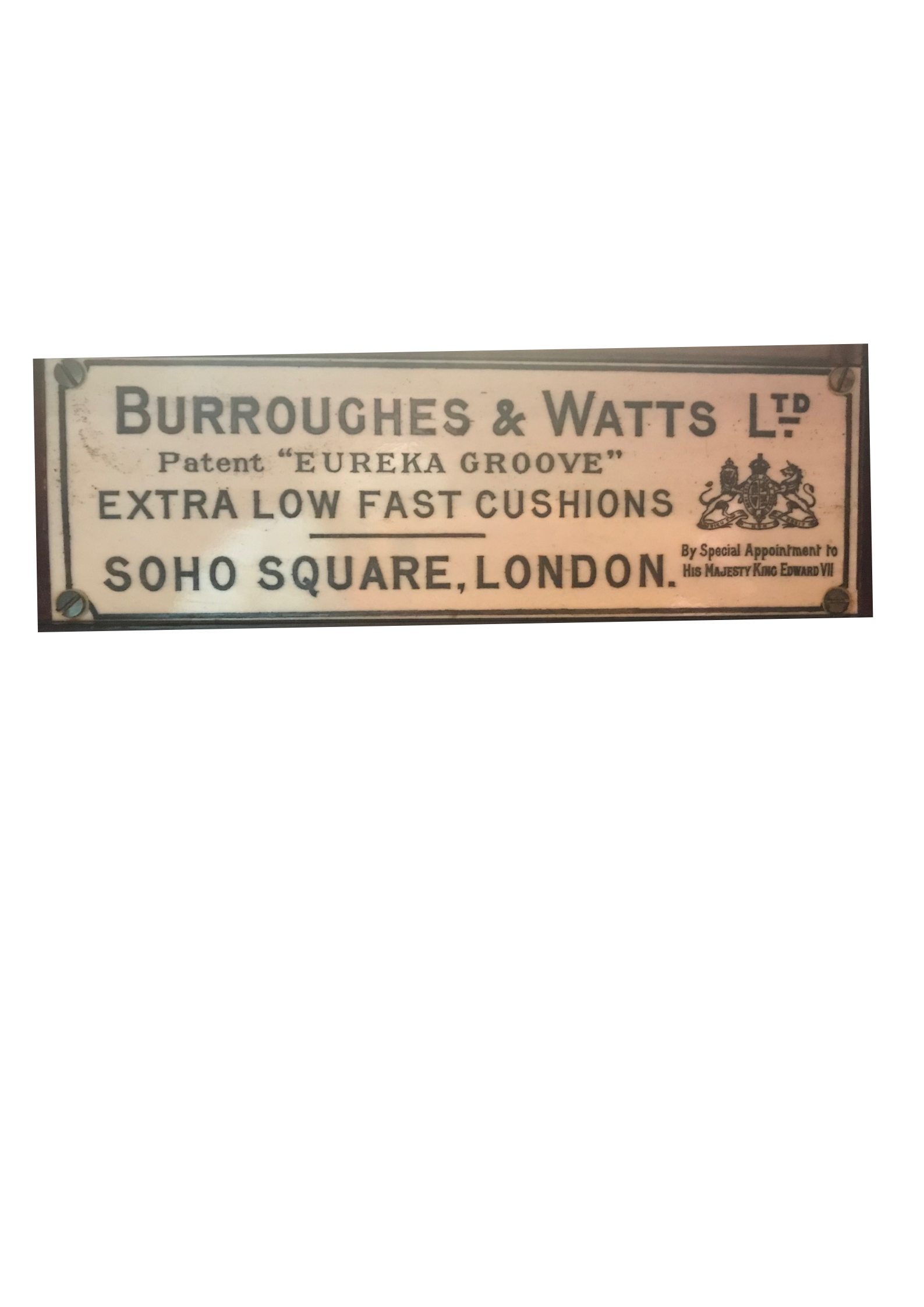
Plaque from side of Burroughes and Watts billiard table, circa 1905

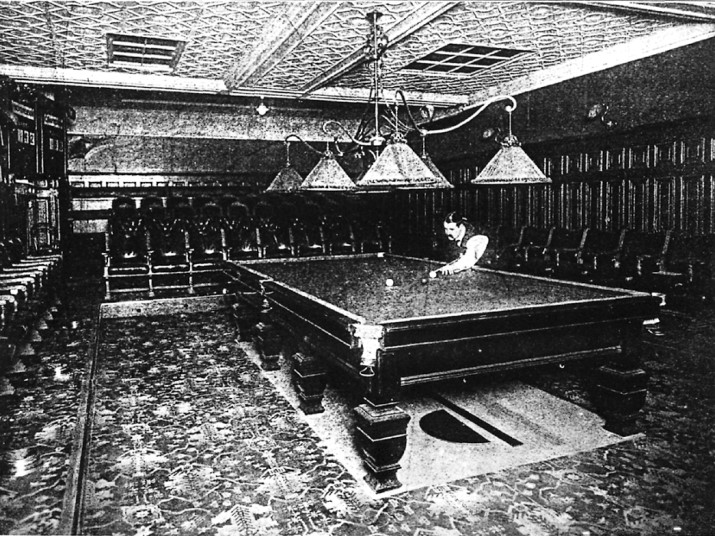
Matchroom at Burroughes Hall

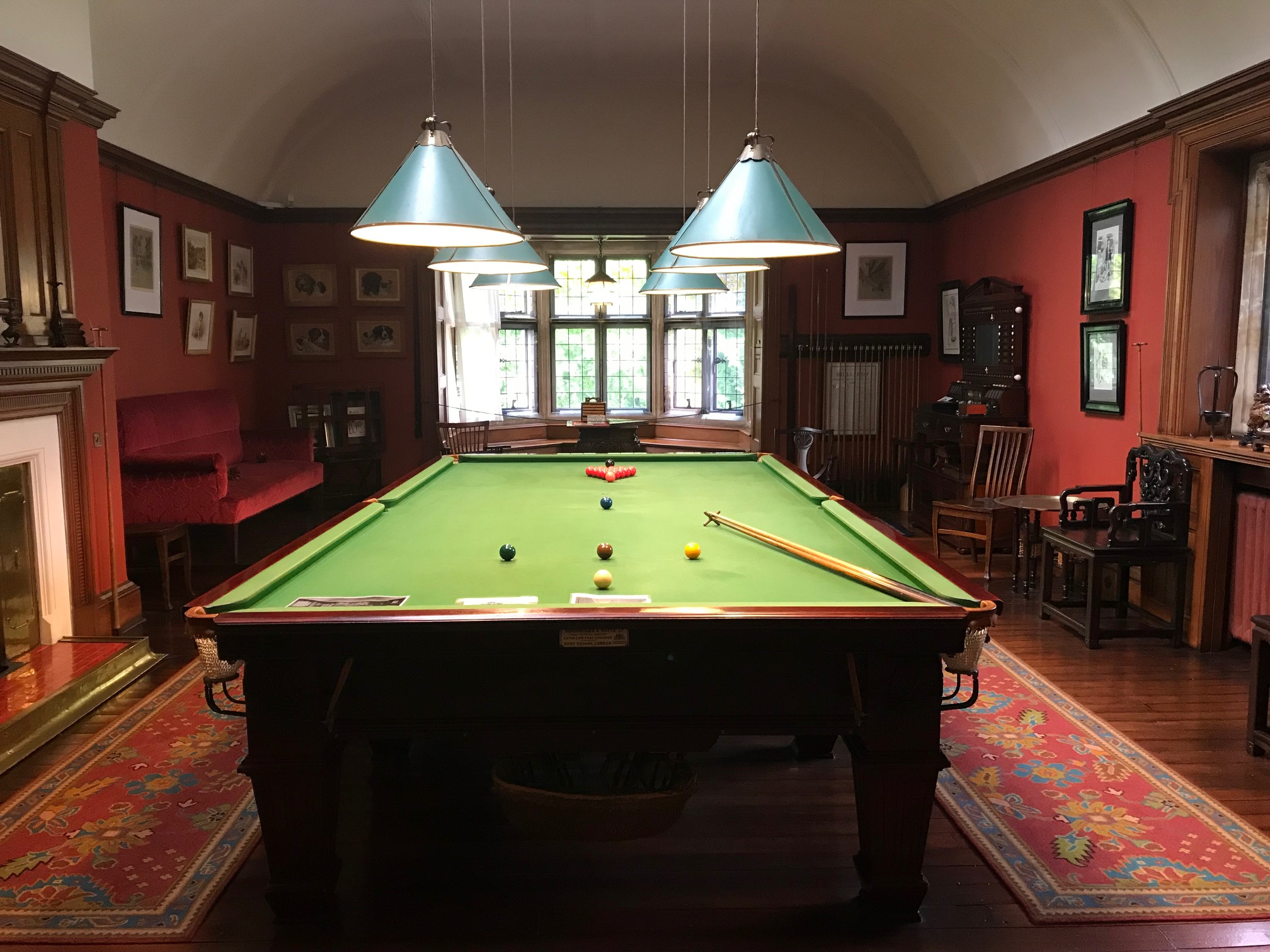
Full size billiard table made by Burroughes and Watts circa 1905 (in Olveston Historic Home, Dunedin)

Burroughes Hall was an important billiards and snooker venue in Soho Square, London from 1903 until it closed in 1967. The hall was in the premises of Burroughes & Watts Ltd., who had been at 19 Soho Square since 1836. Burroughes & Watts opened a new billiards saloon in 1903, known as the Soho Square Saloon. This was re-opened as the Soho Square Hall in 1904 and was renamed Burroughes Hall in 1913. In 1967, control of Burroughes & Watts Ltd. was taken over by a group of property developers. The assets included 19 Soho Square, which was demolished and replaced by a modern office block.

In 1919 Burroughes & Watts opened a second London match-room in Piccadilly, generally called the New Burroughes Hall. This venture was not a financial success and the new venue closed in 1925. During this period, the hall in Soho Square was sometimes known as the Old Burroughes Hall.

== Snooker ==
Before World War I, Burroughes & Watts organised an annual professional billiards 'London tournament'. This was a handicapped American tournament played at Soho Square Hall. In four tournaments, from 1907/08 to 1910/11, a snooker competition was arranged in parallel to the billiards. This generally consisted of a frame of snooker played at the end of each session of billiards. Soho Square Hall was also the venue of one of the earliest professional snooker matches, hosting a match of 101 frames between John Roberts and Tom Reece from 25 May to 6 June 1908. The match was for £100, £50 for the player winning most frames and £50 for the player winning most aggregate points. Roberts won both prizes, winning 54½ frames to 46½ and 5,529 points to 5,209. Roberts made a break of 73, equalling a recently set record by James Harris.

Burroughes Hall was sometimes used as the venue for the final of the English Amateur Championship from 1920 to 1962. In the 1920s and 1930s Thurston's Hall in Leicester Square was generally preferred for important professional matches but Burroughes Hall was occasionally used, hosting matches in the 1936 World Snooker Championship and the 1939/1940 Daily Mail Gold Cup when matches were played at the two venues simultaneously.

After World War II, the hall was again used for World Championship matches in 1947 and 1951 as well as for the qualifying competition in 1946, 1947 and 1951. After the closure of Thurston's Hall in early 1955, Burroughes Hall was a regular venue for the News of the World Snooker Tournament until the tournament ended in 1959.

With the revival of the World Championship in a challenge format in 1964, the hall was used for the first three matches in April 1964, October 1964 and March 1965.
