= Herbert Holt (snooker player) =

English snooker player

- Holt with his wife

Personal information
- Born: 1 June 1909 Simonstone, Lancashire, England
- Died: 22 February 2002 (aged 92)

Sport
- Country: England
- Sport: Snooker

Herbert Holt (1 June 1909 – 22 February 2002) was an English professional snooker player.

== Career ==
Herbert Holt was born on 1 June 1909 in Simonstone, Lancashire. His father was Willie Holt, a professional billiards player and manufacturer who invented "rail pockets" that largely replaced the "bag" style of pockets.

Holt played in the qualifying for the 1938 World Snooker Championship, beating Charles Read 21-10 before losing 8–23 to Fred Davis. He entered the World Championship several times after that, lastly in 1950, but never progressed beyond the quarter-finals.

He was a body double for Laurence Olivier in Sleuth and for Roger Moore in The Persuaders. He set up a billiard table and cue sorts equipment business in the 1930s and sold billiard tables to celebrities including Michael Caine, John Lennon and Tom Jones. He established a snooker club in Great Windmill Street in the 1960s that went on to host the English Amateur Championship and Women's Billiards Association events.

Holt died on 22 February 2002, aged 92.
