= Thurston's Hall =

Snooker venue in London, England

- Leicester Square Hall (from 1947)
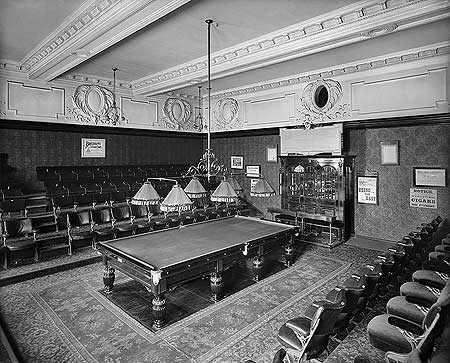
- Thurston's Hall in 1903
- Address: 45–46 Leicester Square; London; England
- Current use: Fanum House

Construction
- Opened: 1901
- Closed: 1955
- Years active: 1901–1940, 1947–1955

Thurston's Hall was a major billiards and snooker venue between 1901 and 1955 in Leicester Square, London. The hall was in the premises of Thurston & Co. Ltd which relocated to Leicester Square in 1901. The building was bombed in 1940 and reopened under a new name, Leicester Square Hall, and new management in 1947. The venue closed in 1955 and the building was demolished to make way for an extension to Fanum House. The Hall was used for many important billiards and snooker matches, including 12 World Snooker Championship finals between 1930 and 1953. It was also the venue of the first World Snooker Championship match in November 1926. The hall was sometimes referred to as "Thurston's Grand Hall". There was also a "Minor Hall" in the same building.

== Opening ==
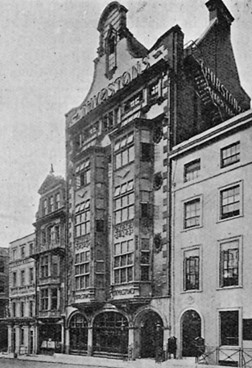
Exterior shot of Thurston's Hall

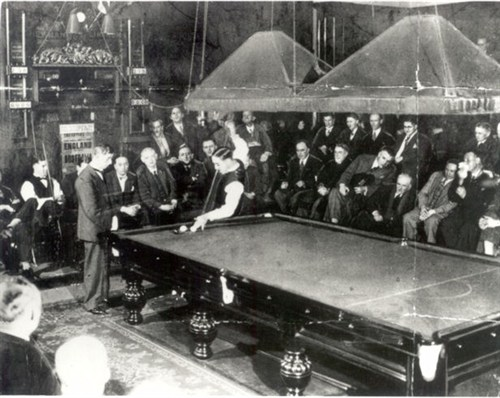
Billiards - Walter Lindrum v Tom Newman

In 1900 Thurston & Co. Ltd. were forced to relocate from their premises at 16 Catherine Street because it was in the way of a new street from Holborn to the Strand. They moved to 45-46 Leicester Square and built new premises there, including a "match room" which became known as "Thurston's Hall". The first important event hosted at the new venue was the Billiards Association American tournament. This was a round-robin handicap event featuring 8 professionals and ran from 7 to 12 October 1901. The event resulted in a tie between William Peall and Harry Stevenson, with 6 wins out of 7. There was a play-off on the Monday. Peall received 100 start but Stevenson won 500–395.

== Bombing ==
On 16 October 1940, during The Blitz, the Leicester Square premises were destroyed by a parachute mine which demolished the south-western corner of the square. Only two minor injuries were reported. The building was housing an "exhibition of billiards antiquities" at the time and many of the items were destroyed. The last major event at the hall was the English Amateur Billiards Championship which was won, on 5 April, by Kingsley Kennerley for the fourth successive time. A "summer" professional snooker tournament was started on 15 April but was abandoned in May.

== Reopening ==
The hall reopened under new management as the Leicester Square Hall in October 1947. Joe Davis and Sidney Smith played an exhibition match from 6 to 11 October. Davis, conceding 10 points per frame, won 38–33. This was followed by the final of the 1947 World Snooker Championship between Walter Donaldson and Fred Davis. The match was over 145 frames and was played from 13 to 25 October. Donaldson won the match 82–63, having taken a winning lead of 73–49 on the previous afternoon. Fred Davis made a 135 clearance in frame 86, just one short of the championship record.

== Closure ==
The last competitive match at the hall was played from 13 to 15 January 1955 between Joe Davis and his brother, Fred. This was the final match of the 1954/55 News of the World Tournament. Joe won the match 19–18 but the tournament was won by Jackie Rea, Joe finishing in second place. Joe made a 137 clearance on the final day.

Joe Davis compiled the first officially recognised maximum break at Leicester Square Hall on Saturday 22 January 1955 in a match against 68-year-old fellow Englishman Willie Smith. The match between Davis and Smith was played as part of a series of events marking the closure of Leicester Square Hall. The Billiards Association and Control Council initially refused to accept the break since the match was not played under their rules. At the time the professionals played using a rule (now standard) whereby after a foul a player could compel the offender to play the next stroke. It was only at a meeting on 20 March 1957 that they recognised the break. Davis was presented with a certificate to commemorate the event. From 17 to 22 January Joe Davis played Willie Smith at both billiards and snooker. In the snooker match Smith received 28 points in each frame but, despite this handicap, Davis won the match by 23 frames to 13. The final match was a snooker contest, played on level terms, between Joe and Fred Davis from 24 to 29 January. The contents were auctioned off on 2 February with the match table on which Davis had made his maximum break being sold for 270 guineas.
