= Albert Brown (snooker player) =

English cricketer and snooker player

Personal information
- Full name: Albert Brown
- Born: 10 July 1911; Birmingham, England
- Died: 27 April 1995 (aged 83); Birmingham, Warwickshire, England
- Batting: Right-handed
- Bowling: Right-arm fast-medium

Domestic team information
- Years: Team
- 1932: Warwickshire

Career statistics
Competition	First-class
Matches	1
Runs scored	1
Batting average	–
100s/50s	–/–
Top score	1*
Balls bowled	216
Wickets	2
Bowling average	48.00
5 wickets in innings	–
10 wickets in match	–
Best bowling	2/96
Catches/stumpings	1/–
- Source: Cricinfo, 30 December 2011

Albert Brown (10 July 1911 – 27 April 1995) was an English cricketer and snooker player. He made just one first-class appearance for Warwickshire County Cricket Club in 1932. As a snooker player he was twice runner-up in the English Amateur Championship and reached the semi-final of the World Snooker Championship four times between 1948 and 1953.

== Early life ==
Brown was born in Birmingham on 10 July 1911. He attended a boarding school from the age of seven, where he started playing English billiards on a three-quarter size billiard table and won the school championship for nine successive years. After leaving school, Brown's sporting focus was on cricket rather than cue sports, and he did not play billiards again until the age of 24, shortly after which a friend introduce him to snooker. A year after taking up snooker, Brown won the Midland Amateur Championship, defeating Kingsley Kennerley 4–0 in the final. He won the title again the following year, and after a hiatus in the championship being staged during World War II, completed a run of three wins. Before becoming a professional snooker player, he worked as a bus driver.

== Cricket ==
Between snooker seasons, Brown played cricket. A fast bowler, he was invited to play for Warwickshire after achieving hat tricks in consecutive weeks.

Brown made a single first-class appearance for Warwickshire against the touring Indians at Edgbaston in 1932. The Indians made 282 all out in their first-innings, with Brown taking the wickets of Naoomal Jeoomal and Amar Singh to finish with figures of 2/61 from 22 overs. In Warwickshire's first-innings of 354 all out, Brown ended the innings not out on a single run. He bowled 14 wicketless overs in the Indians second-innings of 344 declared and wasn't required to bat in Warwickshire's second-innings of 110/3, with the match being declared a draw. This was his only major appearance for Warwickshire. He retired from cricket after failing to recover fully from a pulled muscle.

== Snooker ==
He was runner-up in the English Amateur Championship in 1940, losing 7–8 to Kennerley. The next time the tournament was held, in 1946, Brown lost 3–5 to John Pulman in the final. Both Pulman and Brown and turned professional shortly afterwards.

After turning professional Brown played in a number of major events from 1947 to 1953, and reached the semi-finals of the World Snooker Championship four times, in 1948, 1950, 1952 and 1953. He also was runner-up in the 1951/1952 News of the World Snooker Tournament, missing out on victory by a single frame. His last competitive appearance was in the 1954/1955 News of the World Snooker Tournament.

== Death ==
He died in Birmingham, on 27 April 1995.
