= John Barrie (snooker player) =

English snooker and billiards player (1924–1996)

- John Barrie (right) preparing for a massé shot

Personal information
- Born: 30 June 1924 Wisbech, Cambridgeshire, England
- Died: 20 April 1996 (aged 71) Kings Lynn, Norfolk, England

Sport
- Country: England
- Sport: Snooker
- Professional: 1945–1955, 1978–1982
- Best ranking finish: Last 24 (x1)

John Barrie (30 June 1924 – 20 April 1996) was one of the leading professional billiards and snooker players from the mid-1940s. His real name was William Barrie Smith. He won the 1950 UK Professional Billiards Championship defeating Kingsley Kennerley 9046–5069 in the final.

He was born in Wisbech, Cambridgeshire where his family ran The White Lion Hotel. In his later career Barrie coached many of England's leading players including Chateriss's Albert ' Snowy' Salisbury and the future 1984 World Professional Billiards Champion Mark Wildman of Peterborough. He died in Kings Lynn, Norfolk aged 71.
