= 2009 World Snooker Championship =

Professional snooker tournament

2009 Betfred.com World Snooker Championship
Tournament information
- Dates: 18 April – 4 May 2009
- Venue: Crucible Theatre
- City: Sheffield
- Country: England
- Organisation: WPBSA
- Format: Ranking event
- Total prize fund: £1,111,000
- Winner's share: £250,000
- Highest break: Stephen Hendry (SCO) (147)

Final
- Champion: John Higgins (SCO)
- Runner-up: Shaun Murphy (ENG)
- Score: 18–9

The 2009 World Snooker Championship (officially the 2009 Betfred.com World Snooker Championship) was a professional snooker tournament. It was held at the Crucible Theatre in Sheffield, England, the 33rd consecutive year that the World Snooker Championship was staged at the venue. It took place between 18 April and 4 May 2009. The eighth and final ranking tournament of the 2008–09 snooker season, it was organised by the World Professional Billiards and Snooker Association and sponsored for the first time by online betting shop Betfred. The total prize fund was £1,111,000, of which the winner received £250,000.

The qualifying rounds took place from 26 February to 4 March and from 8 to 10 March 2009 at the English Institute of Sport. The 16 qualifiers and the top 16 players from the snooker world rankings reached the tournament's main stage at the Crucible. Ronnie O'Sullivan was the defending champion, having defeated Ali Carter 18–8 in the 2008 final. He lost in the second round to Mark Allen.

John Higgins defeated Shaun Murphy 18–9 in the final to win his third world title and 20th ranking title. The final was refereed by Michaela Tabb, who became the first woman to officiate at a World Snooker Championship final. A total of 83 century breaks were compiled during the event's main stage, the highest being a 147 by Stephen Hendry in his quarter-final match against Murphy. It was the highest number of centuries compiled at the tournament's main stage until 2015. Another 69 century breaks were made during the qualifying rounds.

== Background ==
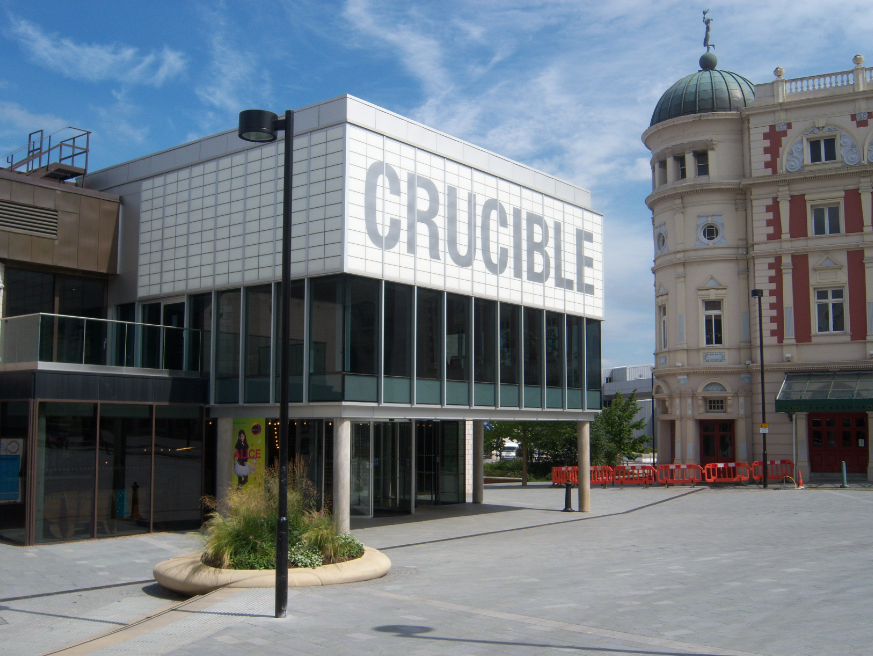
For the 33rd consecutive year, the main stage of the tournament was held at the Crucible Theatre (pictured) in Sheffield, England.

The inaugural 1927 World Snooker Championship, then known as the Professional Championship of Snooker, took place at various venues in England between November 1926 and May 1927. Joe Davis won the final—held at Camkin's Hall in Birmingham from 9 to 12 May 1927—and went on to win the tournament 15 consecutive times before retiring undefeated after the 1946 edition (no tournaments were held from 1941 to 1945 because of World War II). The tournament went into abeyance after only two players contested the 1952 edition, due to a dispute between the Professional Billiards Players' Association (PBPA) and the Billiards Association and Control Council (BACC). The PBPA established an alternative tournament, the World Professional Match-play Championship, of which the six editions held between 1952 and 1957 are retroactively regarded as legitimate continuations of the World Snooker Championship. However, due to waning public interest in snooker during the post-war era, that tournament was also discontinued, and the world title was uncontested between 1958 and 1963.

Then-professional player Rex Williams was instrumental in reviving the World Snooker Championship on a challenge basis in 1964. John Pulman, winner of the 1957 World Professional Match-play Championship, defended the world title across seven challenge matches between 1964 and 1968. The World Snooker Championship reverted to an annual knockout tournament for the 1969 edition, marking the beginning of the championship's "modern era". The 1977 edition was the first staged at the Crucible Theatre in Sheffield, where it has remained since. The most successful players in the modern era was Stephen Hendry, having won the title seven times. Hendry was also the tournament's youngest winner, having captured his first title at the 1990 event, aged 21 years and 106 days. Ray Reardon became the oldest winner when he secured his sixth title at the 1978 event, aged 45 years and 203 days.

Organised by the World Professional Billiards and Snooker Association, the 2009 tournament was sponsored by online betting shop Betfred for the first time.

=== Prize fund ===
The breakdown of prize money for this year is shown below:

- Winner: £250,000
- Runner-up: £125,000
- Semi-final: £52,000
- Quarter-final: £24,050
- Last 16: £16,000
- Last 32: £12,000
- Last 48: £8,200
- Last 64: £4,600
- Stage one highest break: £1,000
- Stage two highest break: £10,000
- Stage one maximum break: £5,000
- Stage two maximum break: £147,000
- Total: £1,111,000

== Summary ==
=== First round ===
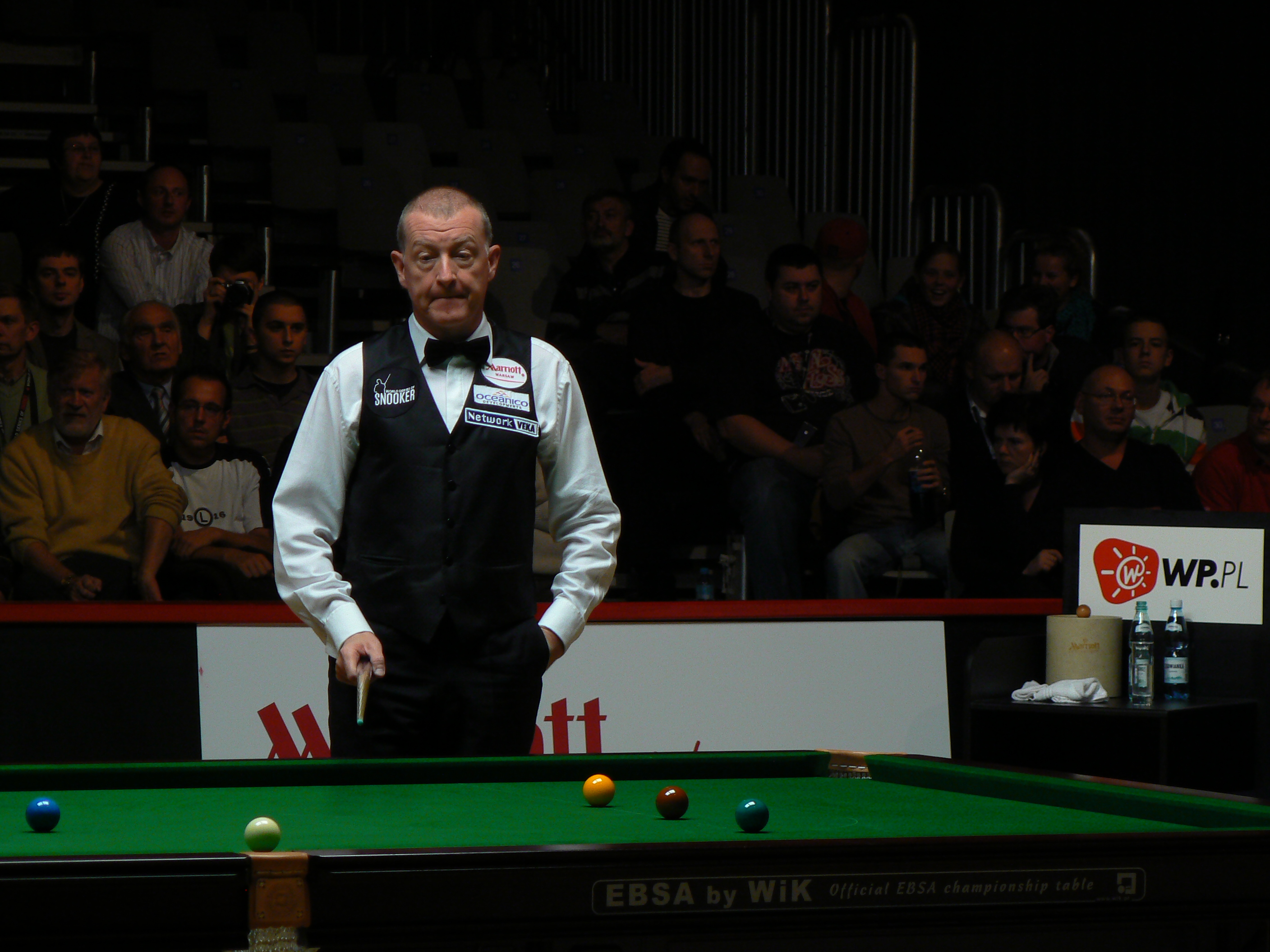
Steve Davis (pictured in 2008) qualified for the main stage of the World Championship for a record-extending 29th time, but he was defeated 2‍–‍10 by Neil Robertson.

The first round was played between 18 and 23 April as the best of 19 frames held over two sessions. The defending champion, Ronnie O'Sullivan, made breaks of 61, 140, 104, 73, 78, 94, 100 and 97 for a 10‍–‍5 victory against Stuart Bingham, although he rated his performance with a five out of ten. Six-time world champion Steve Davis qualified for the main stage of the World Championship for a record-extending 29th time, but he was defeated 2‍–‍10 by Neil Robertson, who notched a century break of 135 in the process. Clive Everton, writing for The Guardian, hinted that this could be Davis's last appearance at the Crucible. "To me it's not about going out in style. I've gone past that. I'm going down the wall hanging on by my fingernails," Davis said. In a duel between two former world champions, Stephen Hendry won 10‍–‍7 over Mark Williams, who had to have his cue stick repaired in the middle of the match. Graeme Dott, winner in 2006, disposed of Barry Hawkins with a 10‍–‍8 result.

There were four debutants at the Crucible in this edition—Rory McLeod, Martin Gould, Andrew Higginson and Ricky Walden—and they were all defeated in the first round. McLeod, who became the first-ever black player to play at the Crucible, lost 5‍–‍10 to Mark King. Gould defeated the 2000 and 2005 runner-up, Matthew Stevens, in the qualifiers to earn a place at the Crucible, but he could not make it past Mark Allen, who knocked him out in the first round with a 10‍–‍6 result. Allen, semi-finalist of the 2008 Bahrain Championship during the season, produced a half-century of 88 in the last frame. As he went into his first-round match against Higginson, Shaun Murphy, the 2005 winner, was threatened by his wife to be presented with the divorce papers at the Crucible. Higginson took the lead at 6‍–‍5 at the beginning of the second session, but Murphy prevailed with a 10‍–‍8 result despite the personal issues. Walden, champion of both the invitational 2008 Six-red Snooker International and the ranking 2008 Shanghai Masters earlier in the season, lost 6‍–‍10 to Mark Selby, runner-up in 2007. Selby made three centuries in the second session to seal victory.

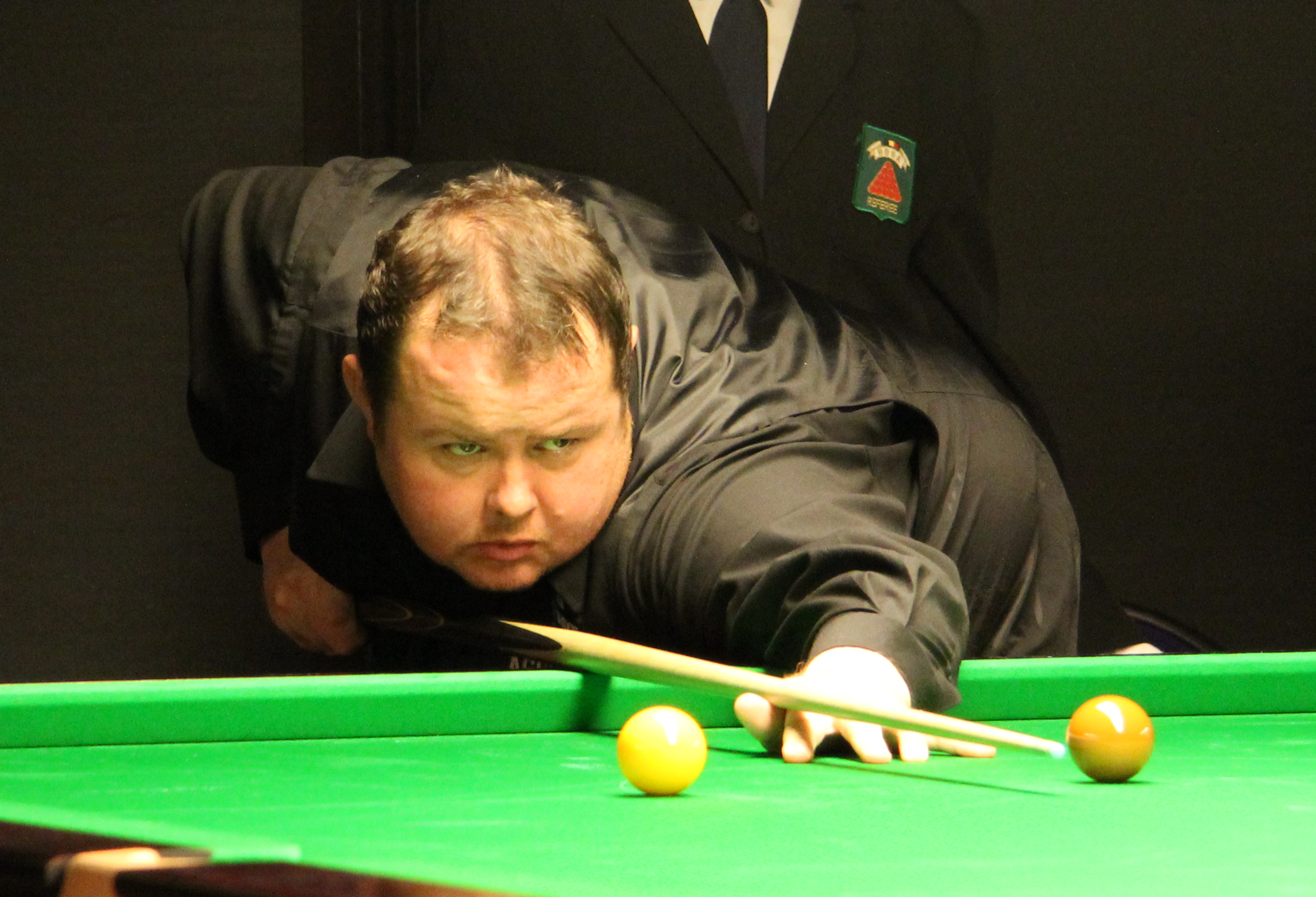
Stephen Lee (pictured in 2011) was defeated in the first round by Ryan Day. Four years later, he was found guilty of conspiring to lose the match.

The runner-up in the previous edition, Ali Carter, had won his first ranking event earlier in the season, the 2009 Welsh Open. In his first-round match, he beat Gerard Greene 10‍–‍5. Greene, having reached the Crucible on four occasions, had never made it past the first round of the event. Stephen Maguire compiled breaks of 98, 96, 101, 122, 79 and 127 for a 10‍–‍5 defeat of Jamie Burnett. A few months earlier, at the 2008 UK Championship, the game between both players, which also went Maguire's way, was investigated after there were allegations of match fixing, but neither of the players was charged. Marco Fu constructed three centuries en route to a 10‍–‍4 victory over Joe Swail. John Higgins, world champion in 1998 and 2007, fell 2‍–‍4 behind Michael Holt during the first session, but he only conceded one more frame as he completed the comeback for a 10‍–‍5 win. Ding Junhui led Liang Wenbo 7‍–‍4, but Liang won four frames on the trot to put himself ahead. Ding then took three consecutive frames, featuring a century break, to clinch victory with a 10‍–‍8 result.

Only two out of the sixteen seeded players lost their first round matches. The 2002 world champion, Peter Ebdon, was defeated 5‍–‍10 by Nigel Bond, while Joe Perry lost 6‍–‍10 against Jamie Cope, who made good long pots to advance into the second round of the World Championship for the first time in his career. Stephen Lee lost 4‍–‍10 against Ryan Day. In September 2013, he was found guilty of conspiring to lose that match, as well as six more. As part of a series of offenses, Lee received a 12-year ban and was ordered to pay £40,000 in costs. "There have been occasions when certain games have been questioned beforehand. You have heard there were certain betting patterns, but I heard nothing about any betting action at the time," Day said when he found out.

=== Second round ===
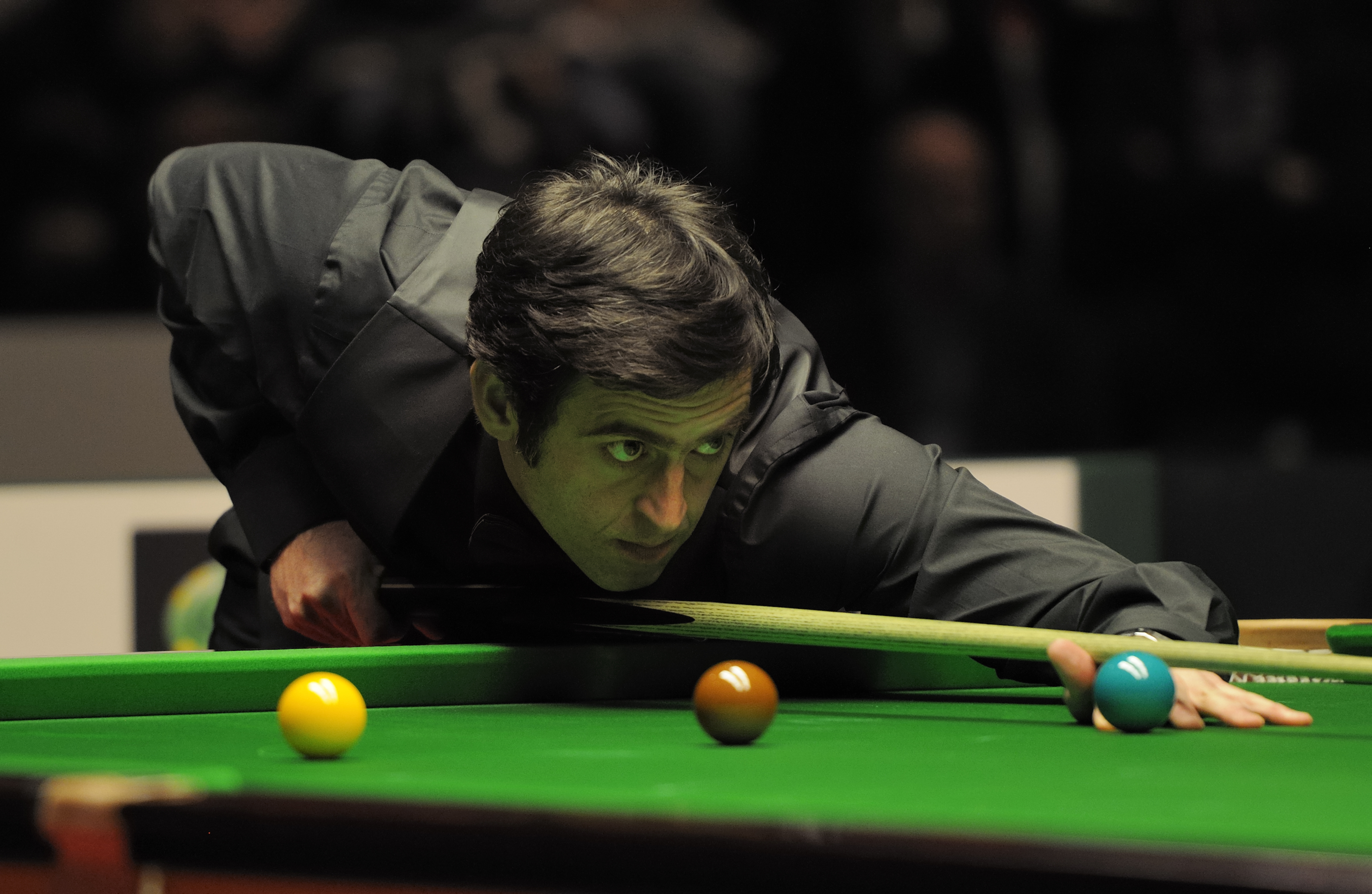
Ronnie O'Sullivan (pictured in 2012) lost 11‍–‍13 to Mark Allen in the second round and failed to defend his title.

The second round of the event was played as the best of 25 frames, held over three sessions, between 23 and 27 April. Fourteen of the sixteen seeds reached the second round, along with two qualifiers, Bond and Cope. While the second round was being played, it was announced that the World Championship would continue to be played at the Crucible Theatre at least until 2014. Allen, who trailed O'Sullivan 7‍–‍9 at the beginning of the last session, went on to win 13‍–‍11. O'Sullivan failed to defend the title, a feat last achieved by Hendry in 1996. "Mark [Allen] played brilliantly. He was better than me and if he keeps on playing as well he's got a great chance of winning the whole thing," O'Sullivan said. Day, who had yet to win a ranking event, progressed into the quarter-finals with a 13‍–‍5 win over Bond.

A break of 103, the third century of the match for him, put Cope 12‍–‍10 up against Higgins, two frames ahead with only three left to play. Higgins made a 96 break as he halved the deficit and then forced a decider, which had to be stopped halfway through for some minutes as a spectator fell sick and was treated. Higgins sealed victory with an 80 break that began with a tricky shot to a middle pocket. "I thought I'd got him," regretted Cope, who acknowledged he had had chances to win. Selby played Dott in a match which saw a controversial decision made by referee Alan Chamberlain. Dott had played a shot and was about to go in-off, but stopped the cue ball with his fist, not allowing it to drop into the pocket and leaving it on the bed of the table. The referee called a foul and awarded four penalty points to Selby. Convinced that he now had the cue ball in hand, as would have been the case after an in-off, Selby picked it up and placed it inside the "D". However, the referee called a foul on him and awarded four points to Dott. Chamberlain's reasoning, as he voiced to the players, was that since the cue ball had never left the bed of the table, Selby should have played his next shot from where it had finished and not from the "D". Even though both players disputed the referee's call, it remained unchanged. Selby went on to win 13‍–‍10.

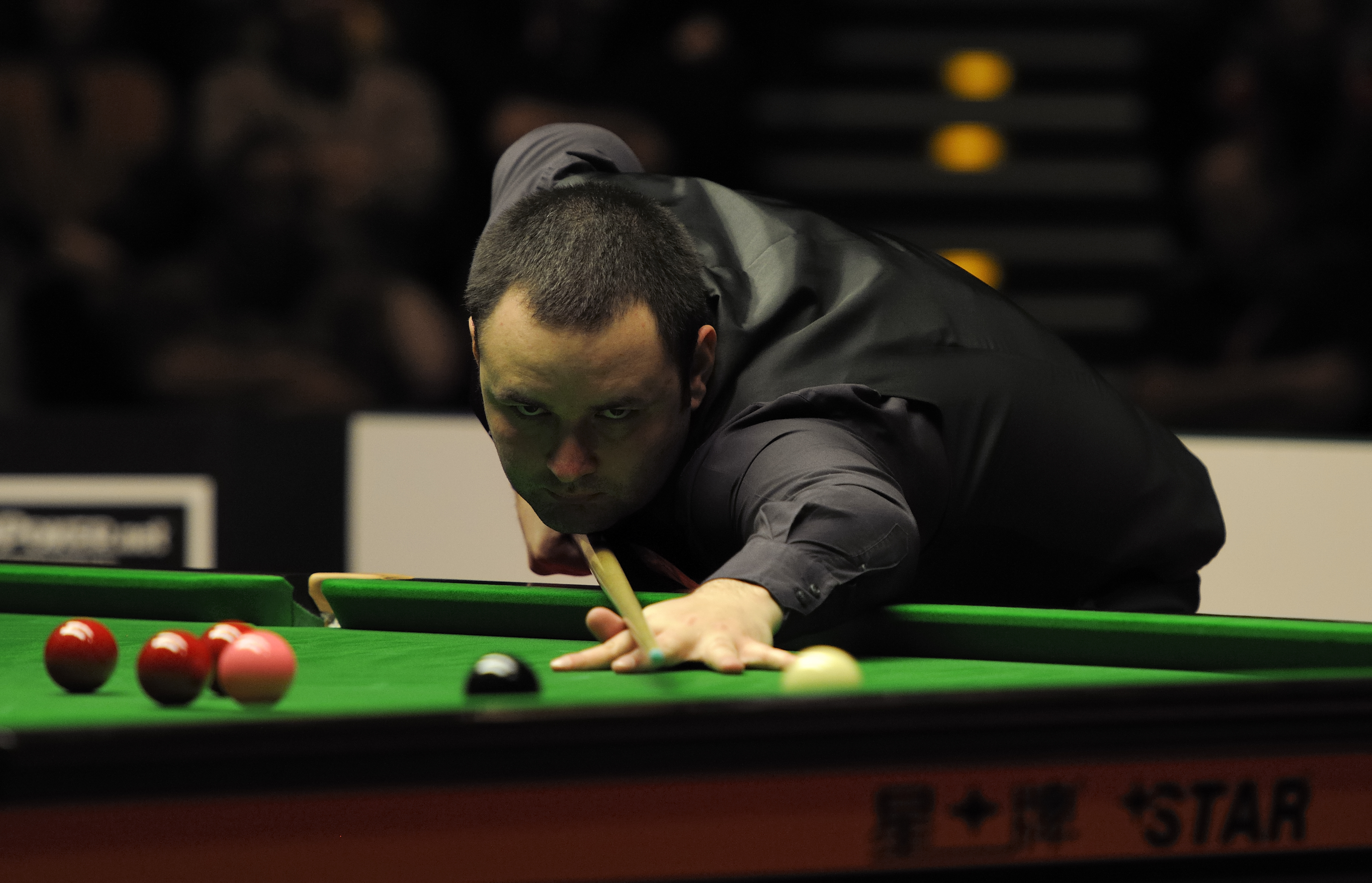
Stephen Maguire (pictured in 2012) and Mark King played a frame that lasted 75 minutes, the longest in Crucible history at that point.

Fu, who saw Murphy build a 7‍–‍1 lead against him in the first session, kicked off the second one with a 129 century break. Murphy, however, clinched victory with a 13‍–‍3 result and a session to spare. "I'm hitting the ball very well and I knew coming into the tournament that I'd put the work in and practised hard. I can play well enough to win this tournament for definite," Murphy claimed after the match. Scores were tied at the end of the second session of the duel between Hendry and Ding, who were playing each other at this stage of the tournament for the second year in a row. Hendry exploited an in-off by Ding to edge one ahead. In the following frame, which was the 1,000th Hendry won at the Crucible, he compiled a 140 break to equal O'Sullivan's highest break of the event thus far. He extended his lead to three in the following frame and, despite a 121 by Ding to reduce the difference, Hendry won 13‍–‍10. "Vindication will only come with lifting the trophy, to me that's all I'm here for," Hendry claimed after the match. Seven times a winner of the tournament, his last victory had come a decade before.

Robertson won four of the last five frames of the second session on the final black ball to build a two-frame cushion against Carter at 9‍–‍7. At the resumption, he doubled his lead with breaks of 89 and 59, the second one aided by a fluke when playing a red. Robertson went on to win the match 13‍–‍8. The first session of the match between Maguire and King, which was split at 4‍–‍4, featured a frame which was decided on the final black ball and lasted 75 minutes and 2 seconds, the longest in Crucible history. It was longer than the one played by Dott and Ebdon in the 2006 final, which held the record up to that point. Clive Everton, writing for The Guardian, stated that the session, which in total lasted three and a half hours, was "very slow by modern standards". Maguire prevailed in the end with a 13‍–‍6 defeat of King.

=== Quarter-finals ===
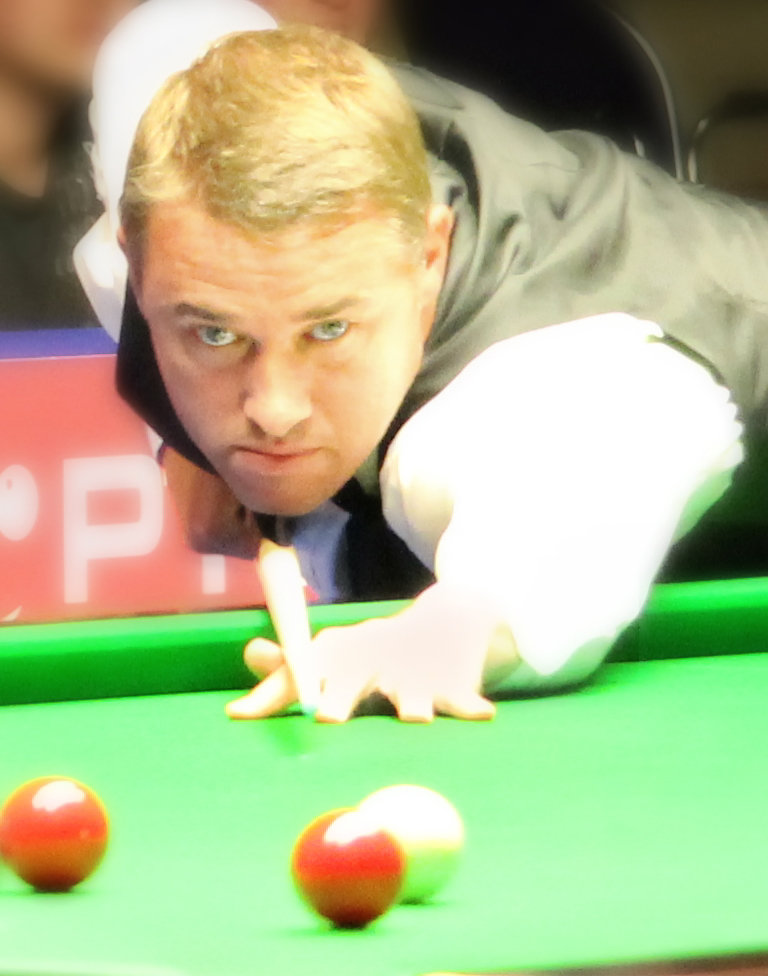
Stephen Hendry (pictured in 2011), playing in the quarter-finals for the 18th time, made a maximum break against Shaun Murphy, the tenth in the history of the main stage of the World Championship.

The quarter-finals of the event were played as the best of 25 frames, held over three sessions, between 28 and 29 April. No qualifiers were left at this stage of the tournament. Allen went into the third session with a two-frame lead over Day, who produced a 106 break at the resumption. Allen replied with another century and the players then exchanged frames until Allen sealed victory at 13‍–‍11. Allen said that in winning the match he had proven wrong those who had deemed him a "one-hit wonder" after his defeat of O'Sullivan. "My dream was to one day play at the Crucible and I've done that. Another dream was to play in the one-table set-up with a chance of winning the World Championship and I'm going to have that in the next match," Allen said regarding his first time as a semi-finalist at the Crucible. Higgins and Selby shared the frames of the first session to end it levelled at 8‍–‍8. Selby compiled three consecutive century breaks of 118, 124 and 117 and made two more, of 114 and 119, to equal the record for most centuries in a match at the World Championship with five. Higgins, who fell behind Selby on several occasions, forced a decider, the second for him in two matches, and won it after two re-racks. "We were sitting there at the two re-racks and [Selby] said, 'Can we just call it a draw because there shouldn't be a loser in this match?'," Higgins said. "I'm flabbergasted. He's such a great player. That was probably my best win ever. That's how highly I regard Mark [Selby] and that's how highly I regard his performance," he added.

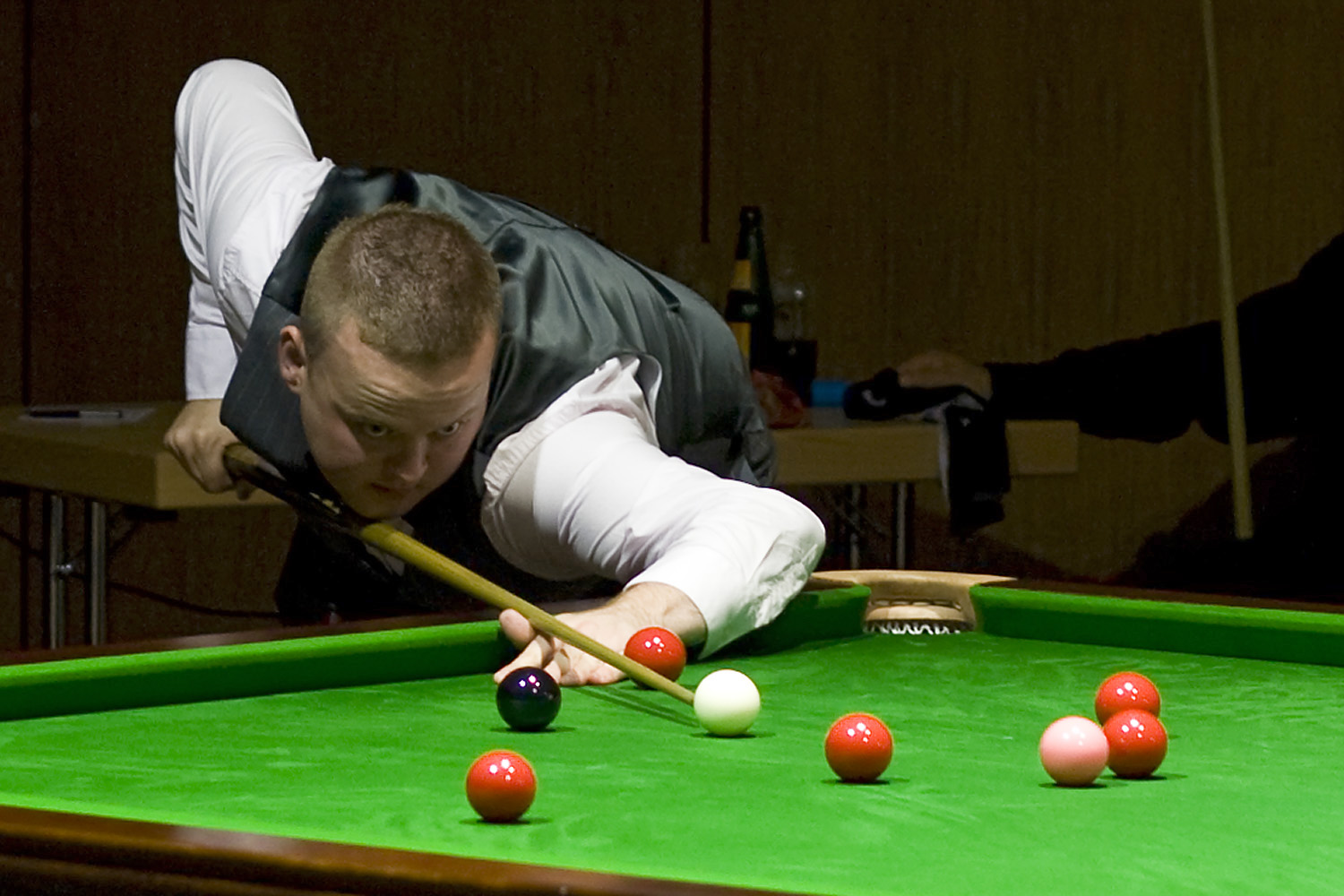
Shaun Murphy (pictured in 2009) replied to Stephen Hendry's maximum break by winning five consecutive frames and sealing a 13‍–‍11 victory.

Hendry was playing in the quarter-finals of the World Championship for a record 18th time. He constructed a 4‍–‍2 lead against Murphy. Hendry then compiled a maximum break in the seventh frame, which guaranteed him £157,000 if no other player managed to make another one. "It's a tremendous feeling and I'm absolutely delighted," Hendry said. In doing so, Hendry equalled O'Sullivan's tally of nine 147s and became the second player, also after O'Sullivan, to score a maximum at the Crucible more than once, having done it for the first time in the semi-finals of the 1995 edition. "You have to grade maximums at the Crucible as the best because of the pressure of this venue," acknowledged six-time world champion Steve Davis. It was only the tenth maximum achieved in the history of the main stage of the World Championship. After the maximum, Murphy replied with five frames on the trot, featuring breaks of 61, 117 and 78, and enjoyed a two-frame cushion going into the last session. Murphy claimed a 13‍–‍11 victory with a century break. "Stephen [Hendry] threw everything at me in the first session, including the kitchen sink. The problem for Stephen was I picked it up and threw it back. That's what happens in top-flight sport," Murphy said afterwards. "Ever since I made the maximum my concentration was nowhere," Hendry lamented. Robertson faced Maguire, who had eliminated him in the second round of the previous edition. Levelled at 5‍–‍5, Robertson took six of the following seven frames. Aided by a century break of 124, he moved within one frame of victory at 12‍–‍7 and eventually won 13‍–‍8. "My safety was really good, my long game was fantastic. There were three frames in a row when I rolled in a long one and cleared up," Robertson said. Robertson was deemed by Clive Everton as "Australia's first authentic title contender since the late Eddie Charlton", runner-up in 1975 and the last Australian player before him to reach the semi-finals of the tournament.

=== Semi-finals ===
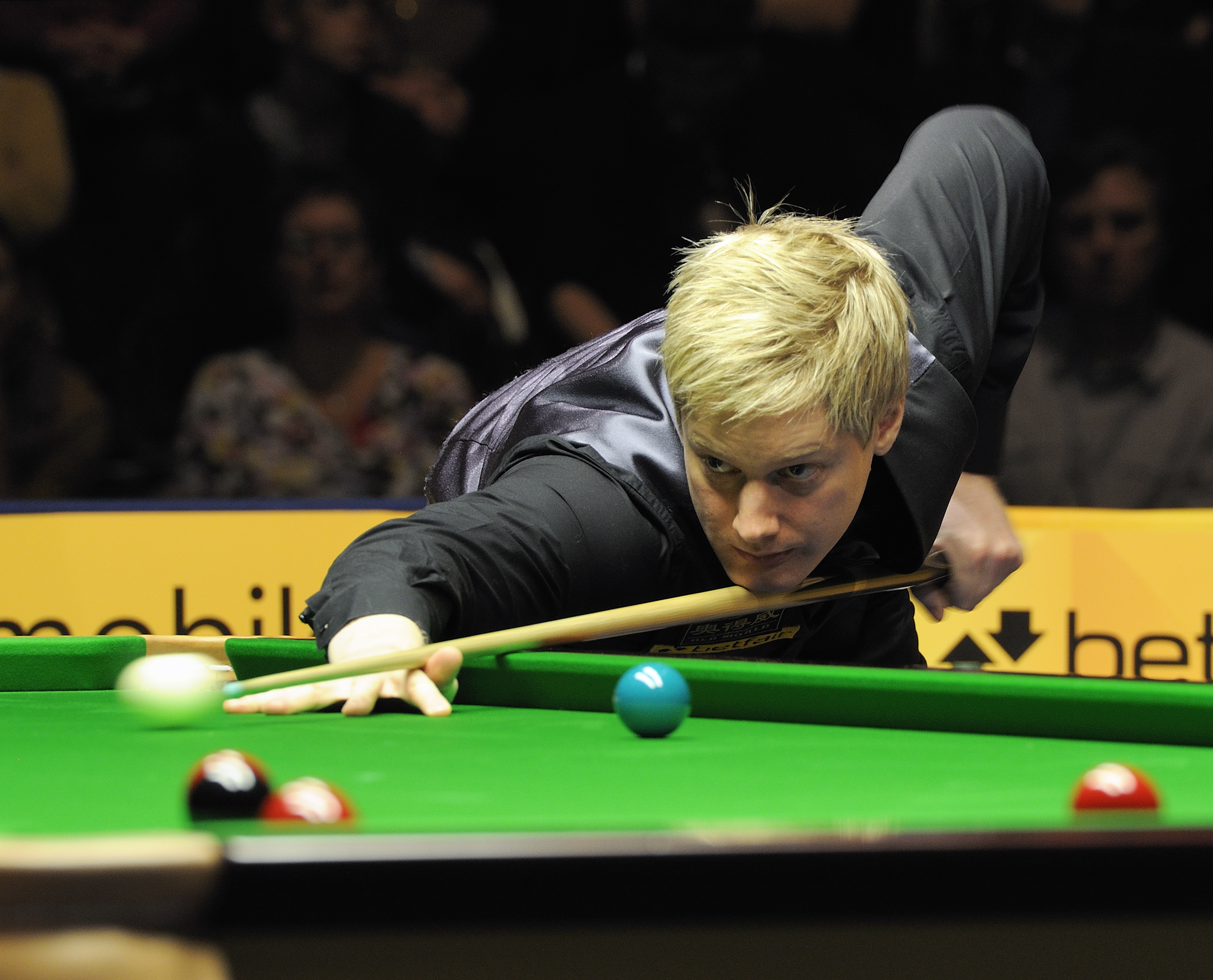
Neil Robertson (pictured in 2013) won seven frames on the trot to level the match at 14‍–‍14, but he went on to lose 14‍–‍17 against Shaun Murphy.

The semi-finals were played as the best of 33 frames, held over four sessions, between 30 April and 2 May. Allen and Robertson were playing in the semi-finals of the World Championship for the first time. Higgins was 6‍–‍2 and 13‍–‍3 ahead against Allen, firing centuries of 114, 129 and 104 in the process. Higgins was on the verge of winning the first frame of the third session as well: he needed two snookers, which he got, but Allen then took it on the black. Allen pulled back to only three frames behind at 12‍–‍15, although Higgins made a 116 century break and won the match 17‍–‍13. "I feel total relief. I was just thinking I could throw this away here," Higgins said. He described Allen as "a street-fighter" and praised him as being "great for the game". "It was a weird match. I was always way behind and although I came back into it I gave myself far too much to do after the first two sessions," Allen admitted.

In the other semi-final, Murphy opened a seven-frame advantage against Robertson at 14‍–‍7. Robertson won seven frames on the bounce to level the scores. "I spent so much time in the chair that the skills I learned as a child had just abandoned me. I just needed to regroup and start again," Murphy said. He spent some time on the practice table during the interval and manufactured a 106 century break at the re-start to put himself ahead once more. Further breaks of 81 and 94 gave him the two frames he needed to advance into the final. "I'm really disappointed. But those breaks [Murphy] made in the final three frames were world-class so he definitely deserved to win," Robertson conceded.

=== Final ===
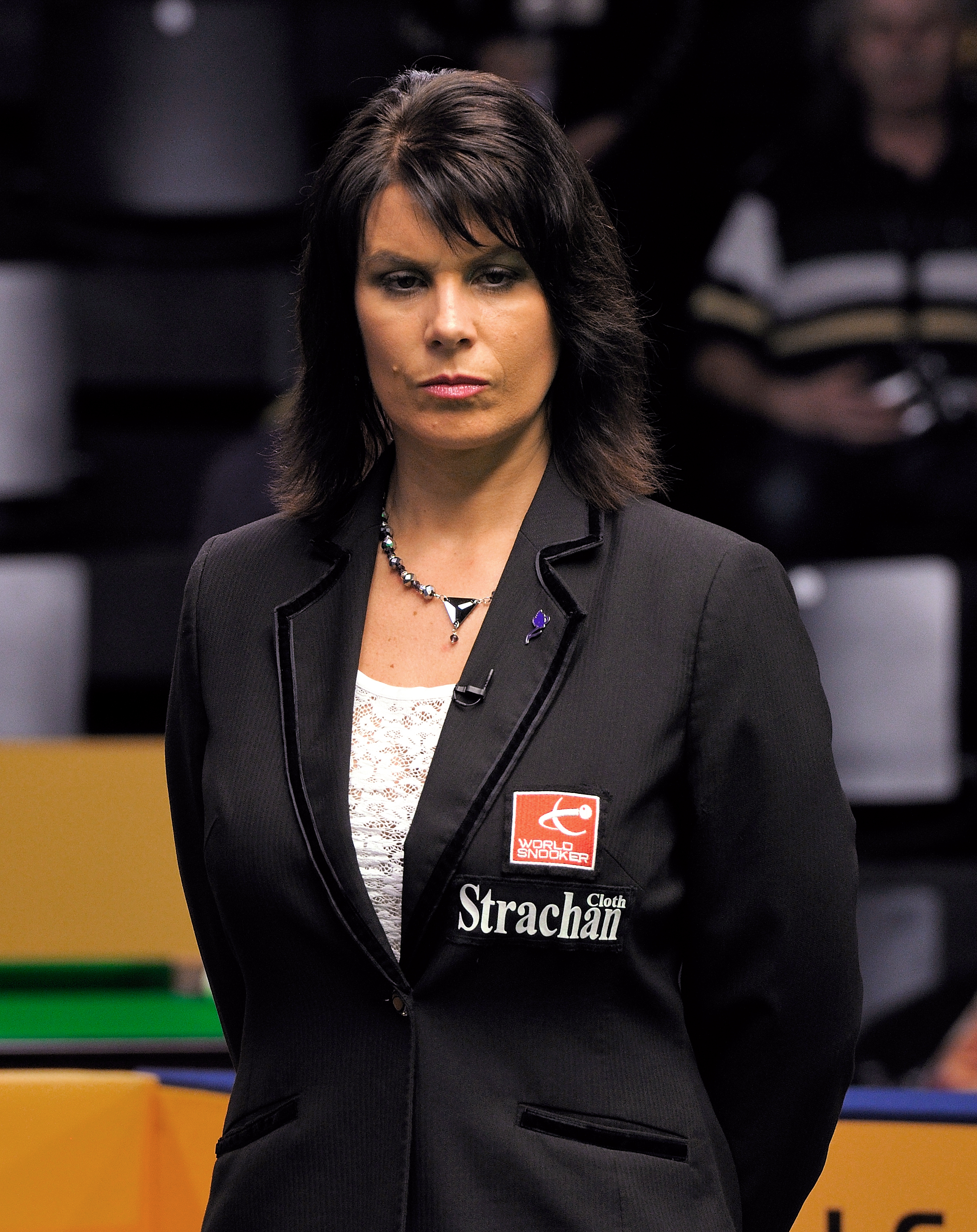
Michaela Tabb (pictured in 2013) became the first woman to referee a World Championship final.

The final was played as a best-of-35-frames, held over four sessions on 3 and 4 May, between Higgins and Murphy. Higgins had already made it to the final at the Crucible on three occasions: he had defeated Ken Doherty in 1998 and Selby in 2007, but he had lost against O'Sullivan in 2001. Murphy was playing his second final, having won the 2005 event coming to the Crucible as a qualifier. The pair had met already once at the Crucible, in that 2005 edition, with Murphy prevailing in the second-round match. Referee Michaela Tabb officiated the final, becoming the first woman to take charge of a World Championship final. "I've been chosen because of my standard of refereeing," she proclaimed. It was the first final contested by two former world champions since 2003, when Williams defeated Doherty.

Higgins took the first three frames of the final, featuring breaks of 78 and 52. Murphy replied with four on the trot, including a 109 break. Higgins made a half-century of his own in the last frame of the first session, but he then missed a pink ball into a middle pocket. After a series of misses by both players, Murphy could have cleared the colours to pinch the frame by only two points and go two ahead, but he missed the green and allowed Higgins back in. Higgins potted both the green and the brown to end the session all-square at 4‍–‍4. Both players made half-centuries at the resumption to go level once again at 5‍–‍5. Higgins then won six consecutive frames, featuring breaks of 95 and twice of 128. The second session ended with Higgins 11‍–‍5 ahead.

Higgins also took the first frame of the third session and, although Murphy responded with a 91 break, Higgins won three more to race into a 14‍–‍6 lead. According to the report by The Guardian, Murphy "wasted an abundance of chances to close the gap amid patchy play by both men", and the session ended with a 16‍–‍8 lead for Higgins. Going into the fourth and last session, Higgins only needed two more frames to seal victory. He took the first with a break of 56 to close within one of victory. The following frame, which Murphy won with a half-century, was Higgins's 1,000th frame at the Crucible. Higgins then produced a 73 break to claim the trophy with an 18‍–‍9 result.

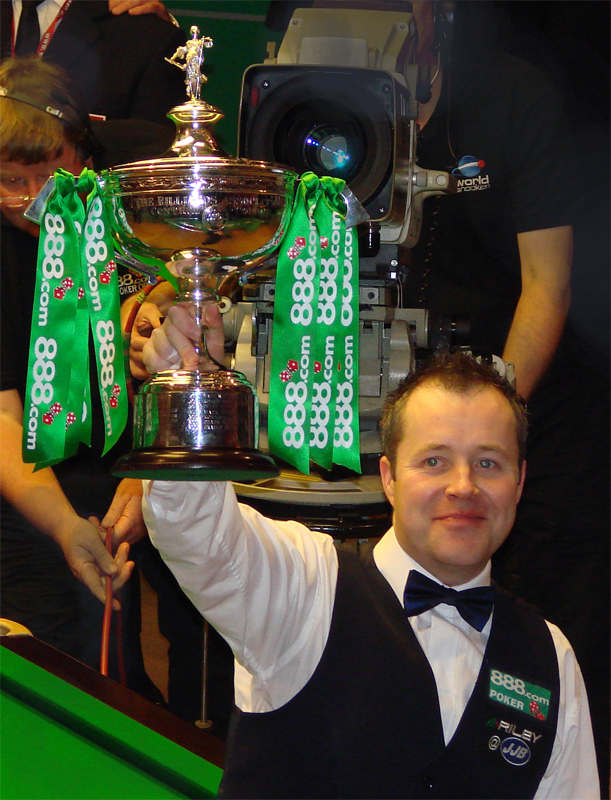
John Higgins (pictured lifting the 2007 World Championship trophy) defeated Shaun Murphy 18‍–‍9 in the final to claim his third world title.

Higgins afterwards pointed to the second session as the one that had made the difference. "Shaun [Murphy] missed a couple of balls he normally wouldn't miss and I just managed to get in there and pinch a couple of frames," he said. The BBC reported that Murphy was "unable to produce the fantastic long potting he had shown in earlier rounds". Clive Everton wrote that Murphy, who only managed to win back-to-back frames on two occasions during the final, "fought an uphill battle manfully". "It is a 17-day tournament, and the first 15-and-a-half days of it were fantastic for me. The last day-and-a-half I am not so pleased with, but I can't let that ruin what has been a great season," Murphy said after the final. Higgins won the title two weeks before his 34th birthday, what made him the oldest world champion since 36-year-old Dennis Taylor in 1985. He became the ninth player to win the World Championship three or more times after Joe Davis, Fred Davis, John Pulman, John Spencer, Ray Reardon, Davis, Hendry and O'Sullivan. "I am over the moon. It's brilliant. To be classed with someone like Ronnie [O'Sullivan], it's an unbelievable honour", Higgins said. Victory allowed Higgins to climb to the fourth place in the rankings going into the following season behind O'Sullivan, Maguire and Murphy.

== Main draw ==
Shown below are the results for each round. The numbers in parentheses beside some of the players are their seeding ranks (each championship has 16 seeds and 16 qualifiers). The draw for the televised stage of the World Snooker Championship was made on 11 March 2009 on Radio Sheffield.

First round Best of 19 frames
18 April
(England) Ronnie O'Sullivan (1)	10
(England) Stuart Bingham	5
19 & 20 April
(Northern Ireland) Mark Allen (16)	10
(England) Martin Gould	6
21 April
(England) Peter Ebdon (9)	5
(England) Nigel Bond	10
22 April
(Wales) Ryan Day (8)	10
(England) Stephen Lee	4
22 & 23 April
(Scotland) John Higgins (5)	10
(England) Michael Holt	5
20 & 21 April
(England) Joe Perry (12)	6
(England) Jamie Cope	10
18 & 19 April
(Scotland) Graeme Dott (13)	10
(England) Barry Hawkins	8
19 & 20 April
(England) Mark Selby (4)	10
(England) Ricky Walden	6
21 & 22 April
(England) Shaun Murphy (3)	10
(England) Andrew Higginson	8
20 April
(Hong Kong) Marco Fu (14)	10
(Northern Ireland) Joe Swail	4
20 & 21 April
(China) Ding Junhui (11)	10
(China) Liang Wenbo	8
18 & 19 April
(Scotland) Stephen Hendry (6)	10
(Wales) Mark Williams	7
18 & 19 April
(England) Ali Carter (7)	10
(Northern Ireland) Gerard Greene	5
21 & 22 April
(Australia) Neil Robertson (10)	10
(England) Steve Davis	2
18 & 19 April
(England) Mark King (15)	10
(England) Rory McLeod	6
22 & 23 April
(Scotland) Stephen Maguire (2)	10
(Scotland) Jamie Burnett	5

Second round Best of 25 frames
23, 24 & 25 April
(England) Ronnie O'Sullivan (1)	11
(Northern Ireland) Mark Allen (16)	13
24 & 25 April
(England) Nigel Bond	5
(Wales) Ryan Day (8)	13
25, 26 & 27 April
(Scotland) John Higgins (5)	13
(England) Jamie Cope	12
26 & 27 April
(Scotland) Graeme Dott (13)	10
(England) Mark Selby (4)	13
24 & 25 April
(England) Shaun Murphy (3)	13
(Hong Kong) Marco Fu (14)	3
23 & 24 April
(China) Ding Junhui (11)	10
(Scotland) Stephen Hendry (6)	13
25, 26 & 27 April
(England) Ali Carter (7)	8
(Australia) Neil Robertson (10)	13
26 & 27 April
(England) Mark King (15)	6
(Scotland) Stephen Maguire (2)	13

Quarter-finals; Best of 25 frames
28 & 29 April
(Northern Ireland) Mark Allen (16)	13
(Wales) Ryan Day (8)	11
28 & 29 April
(Scotland) John Higgins (5)	13
(England) Mark Selby (4)	12
28 & 29 April
(England) Shaun Murphy (3)	13
(Scotland) Stephen Hendry (6)	11
28 & 29 April
(Australia) Neil Robertson (10)	13
(Scotland) Stephen Maguire (2)	8

Semi-finals; Best of 33 frames
30 April 1 & 2 May
(Northern Ireland) Mark Allen (16)	13
(Scotland) John Higgins (5)	17
30 April 1 & 2 May
(England) Shaun Murphy (3)	17
(Australia) Neil Robertson (10)	14

Final; Best of 35 frames
3 & 4 May
(Scotland) John Higgins (5)	18
(England) Shaun Murphy (3)	9

=== Final: frame scores ===
Final: (Best of 35 frames) Crucible Theatre, Sheffield, 3 & 4 May 2009; Referee: Michaela Tabb
John Higgins (5); Scotland				18–9			Shaun Murphy (3); England			
Session 1: 4–4 (4–4)
Frame	1	2	3	4	5	6	7	8	9	10
Higgins	83† (78)	85† (52)	79†	7	50	4	49	69† (50)	N/A	N/A
Murphy	0	6	20	83† (58)	96†	114† (109)	63†	34	N/A	N/A
Session 2: 7–1 (11–5)
Frame	1	2	3	4	5	6	7	8	9	10
Higgins	98† (57)	12	70†	95† (95)	70†	132† (128)	82† (50)	128† (128)	N/A	N/A
Murphy	1	87† (52)	51	11	45	0	0	6	N/A	N/A
Session 3: 5–3 (16–8)
Frame	1	2	3	4	5	6	7	8	9	10
Higgins	64†	0	60†	76†	28	49	94†	80† (52)	N/A	N/A
Murphy	42	91† (91)	49	43	70†	79† (79)	26	59† (52)	N/A	N/A
Session 4: 2–1 (18–9)
Frame	1	2	3	4	5	6	7	8	9	10
Higgins	106† (56)	0	105† (73)	N/A	N/A	N/A	N/A	N/A	N/A	N/A
Murphy	21	78† (59)	0	N/A	N/A	N/A	N/A	N/A	N/A	N/A
(frames 14 and 16) 128				Highest break			109 (frame 6)			
2				Century breaks			1			
11				50+ breaks			7			
(Scotland) John Higgins wins the 2009 World Snooker Championship † = Winner of frame

== Preliminary qualifying ==
The preliminary qualifying rounds for the tournament took place from 25 February 2009 at the English Institute of Sport in Sheffield. (World Professional Billiards and Snooker Association members not on The Tour.)

Round 1

(Republic of Ireland) Bill Kelly	1–5	(India) David Singh
(England) Neil Selman	5–3	(England) Paul Cavney
(England) Barry Stark	5–3	(England) Les Dodd
(England) Stephen Ormerod	5–0	(England) Christopher Flight
(England) Del Smith	5–0	(England) Adam Osbourne
(England) Phil Seaton	5–2	(England) Philip Minchin
(England) Ali Bassiri	1–5	(England) Tony Knowles

Round 2

(England) Colin Mitchell	5–1	(India) David Singh
(England) Neil Selman	5–1	(England) Barry Stark
(England) Stephen Ormerod	1–5	(England) Del Smith
(England) Phil Seaton	2–5	(England) Tony Knowles

== Qualifying ==
The qualifying rounds 1–4 for the tournament took place between 26 February and 4 March 2009 at the English Institute of Sport in Sheffield. The final round of qualifying took place between 8 and 10 March 2009 at the same venue.

Round 1

(China) Li Hang	10–2	(England) Colin Mitchell
(Northern Ireland) Declan Hughes	wd–wo	(England) Neil Selman
(New Zealand) Chris McBreen	10–8	(England) Del Smith
(Netherlands) Stefan Mazrocis	9–10	(England) Tony Knowles

Rounds 2–5

Round 2 Best of 19 frames
(England) Matthew Couch	10
(England) Michael Georgiou	8
(England) Lee Spick	10
(England) Stephen Craigie	5
(England) Jimmy White	10
(Republic of Ireland) Vincent Muldoon	8
(Wales) Daniel Wells	10
(China) Li Hang	9
(Thailand) Supoj Saenla	10
(China) Liu Chuang	5
(Scotland) Scott MacKenzie	9
(England) Wayne Cooper	10
(Northern Ireland) Patrick Wallace	10
(England) Neil Selman	2
(England) Matthew Selt	10
(Scotland) Robert Stephen	3
(Scotland) James McBain	10
(New Zealand) Chris McBreen	2
(England) Simon Bedford	10
(England) David Grace	6
(Wales) Jamie Jones	10
(Thailand) Atthasit Mahitthi	9
(England) Lewis Roberts	10
(India) Aditya Mehta	8
(England) Kuldesh Johal	8
(China) Jin Long	10
(England) Peter Lines	10
(England) Andy Lee	8
(England) Paul Davison	5
(Wales) Andrew Pagett	10
(Republic of Ireland) Rodney Goggins	10
(England) Tony Knowles	4

Round 3 Best of 19 frames
(England) Andrew Norman	4
(England) Matthew Couch	10
(England) Barry Pinches	5
(England) Lee Spick	10
(England) Andy Hicks	10
(England) Jimmy White	8
(Wales) Ian Preece	9
(Wales) Daniel Wells	10
(China) Liu Song	10
(Thailand) Supoj Saenla	9
(Republic of Ireland) Joe Delaney	10
(England) Wayne Cooper	8
(England) Mark Joyce	6
(Northern Ireland) Patrick Wallace	10
(England) Rod Lawler	10
(England) Matthew Selt	5
(Republic of Ireland) David Morris	10
(Scotland) James McBain	3
(England) David Roe	7
(England) Simon Bedford	10
(England) Robert Milkins	7
(Wales) Jamie Jones	10
(Wales) Paul Davies	10
(England) Lewis Roberts	7
(England) David Gray	8
(China) Jin Long	10
(England) Mark Davis	10
(England) Peter Lines	6
(England) Stuart Pettman	10
(Wales) Andrew Pagett	3
(England) Martin Gould	10
(Republic of Ireland) Rodney Goggins	7

Round 4 Best of 19 frames
(England) John Parrott	3
(England) Matthew Couch	10
(England) Adrian Gunnell	2
(England) Lee Spick	10
(England) Rory McLeod	10
(England) Andy Hicks	8
(Scotland) Marcus Campbell	9
(Wales) Daniel Wells	10
(Northern Ireland) Gerard Greene	10
(China) Liu Song	6
(England) Judd Trump	10
(Republic of Ireland) Joe Delaney	1
(England) Tom Ford	10
(Northern Ireland) Patrick Wallace	8
(England) Ricky Walden	10
(England) Rod Lawler	1
(China) Liang Wenbo	10
(Republic of Ireland) David Morris	8
(Scotland) Jamie Burnett	10
(England) Simon Bedford	8
(England) Andrew Higginson	10
(Wales) Jamie Jones	8
(England) Jimmy Michie	6
(Wales) Paul Davies	10
(England) Mike Dunn	10
(China) Jin Long	7
(England) Michael Holt	10
(England) Mark Davis	9
(Scotland) Alan McManus	10
(England) Stuart Pettman	8
(England) Dave Gilbert	8
(England) Martin Gould	10

Round 5 Best of 19 frames
(Northern Ireland) Joe Swail	10
(England) Matthew Couch	1
(England) Steve Davis	10
(England) Lee Spick	8
(England) Ian McCulloch	7
(England) Rory McLeod	10
(England) Barry Hawkins	10
(Wales) Daniel Wells	9
(Republic of Ireland) Ken Doherty	5
(Northern Ireland) Gerard Greene	10
(England) Stephen Lee	10
(England) Judd Trump	8
(Wales) Mark Williams	10
(England) Tom Ford	5
(England) Anthony Hamilton	5
(England) Ricky Walden	10
(England) Dave Harold	3
(China) Liang Wenbo	10
(Republic of Ireland) Fergal O'Brien	6
(Scotland) Jamie Burnett	10
(Republic of Ireland) Michael Judge	4
(England) Andrew Higginson	10
(England) Jamie Cope	10
(Wales) Paul Davies	5
(England) Nigel Bond	10
(England) Mike Dunn	7
(Wales) Dominic Dale	7
(England) Michael Holt	10
(England) Stuart Bingham	10
(Scotland) Alan McManus	6
(Wales) Matthew Stevens	4
(England) Martin Gould	10

== Century breaks ==
This is complete list of century breaks scored in both the qualifying and the televised stages.

=== Televised stage centuries ===
There were 83 century breaks in the televised stage of the World Championship, a new record beating the 68 achieved both in 2002 and 2007; this record was surpassed in 2015.

- 147, 140, 117, 114 – Stephen Hendry
- 141, 131, 129, 128, 128, 128, 116, 114, 113, 107, 104 – John Higgins
- 140, 107, 105, 104, 103 – Ronnie O'Sullivan
- 137, 123, 115, 110, 109, 106, 104, 102, 101, 101 – Shaun Murphy
- 134, 120, 106 – Ryan Day
- 133, 127, 122, 115, 101 – Stephen Maguire
- 130, 121, 112, 111 – Ding Junhui
- 129, 124, 122, 111 – Marco Fu
- 129, 119, 119, 115, 108, 108, 106, 103, 103, 103 – Mark Allen
- 129, 105 – Barry Hawkins
- 127, 124, 119, 118, 117, 117, 114, 104, 101, 101 – Mark Selby
- 125, 124, 112, 105, 101 – Neil Robertson
- 118, 103, 102 – Jamie Cope
- 117 – Graeme Dott
- 114 – Mark King
- 113 – Peter Ebdon
- 110 – Joe Perry
- 102 – Michael Holt
- 100 – Stuart Bingham
- 100 – Ricky Walden

=== Qualifying stage centuries ===
There were 69 century breaks in the qualifying stage of the World Championship:

- 145 – Mark Williams
- 137, 100 – Judd Trump
- 135, 102 – Andy Hicks
- 134, 124, 120, 104 – Jimmy White
- 134, 120, 100 – Liang Wenbo
- 134, 103 – Matthew Selt
- 131 – John Parrott
- 129, 127, 106, 100 – Daniel Wells
- 129 – Matthew Couch
- 128, 103 – Ricky Walden
- 128, 103 – Barry Hawkins
- 127 – Michael Holt
- 127 – Rory McLeod
- 126 – David Morris
- 125, 122, 103 – Ian McCulloch
- 121, 105, 104 – Tom Ford
- 119 – Dave Gilbert
- 117 – Mark Davis
- 117 – Jamie Burnett
- 116 – Stefan Mazrocis
- 116 – Ken Doherty
- 115 – Anthony Hamilton
- 114 – Nigel Bond
- 113, 108, 105, 100 – Martin Gould
- 112, 109 – Li Hang
- 111 – Wayne Cooper
- 110 – Stuart Pettman
- 110 – Dominic Dale
- 109, 101 – Lee Spick
- 109 – Aditya Mehta
- 105, 105 – Jin Long
- 104 – Gerard Greene
- 103 – Jamie Cope
- 102 – Scott MacKenzie
- 102 – Jamie Jones
- 102 – Paul Davison
- 100 – Liu Song
