= 1963–64 snooker season =

Details
- Duration: July 1963 – June 1964
- Tournaments: 2 (non-ranking)

Triple Crown winners
- World Championship: John Pulman (ENG)

The 1963–64 snooker season was the series of professional snooker tournaments played between July 1963 and June 1964. The following table outlines the results for the season's events.

== Calendar ==
Date (Note: Dates use the mm-dd date format.)			Rank	Tournament name	Venue	City	Winner	Runner-up	Score	Ref.
03-16	03-21	ENG	NR	Conayes Professional Tournament	Rex Williams Snooker Centre	Blackheath	John Pulman (ENG)	Fred Davis (ENG)	Round-robin	
04-20	04-20	ENG	NR	World Snooker Championship	Burroughes Hall	London	John Pulman (ENG)	Fred Davis (ENG)	19–16	
