= 1957 World Professional Match-play Championship =

Snooker tournament, held 1957

Tournament information
- Dates: 1–13 April 1957
- Venue: Jersey Billiards Association Match Room
- City: Saint Helier
- Country: Jersey
- Organisation: PBSA

Final
- Champion: John Pulman (ENG)
- Runner-up: Jackie Rea (NIR)
- Score: 39–34

Jersey relative to the UK

The 1957 World Professional Match-play Championship was a professional snooker tournament held from 1 to 13 April in Saint Helier, Jersey. This was the 1957 edition of the World Snooker Championship, first held in 1927. John Pulman won the event for the first time by defeating Jackie Rea 39–34 in the 73-frame final. Rea led in the early stages but Pulman pulled ahead and took a winning lead of 37–29 after the final afternoon session.

There were four participants and three matches, all of which were played at the Jersey Billiards Association Match Room. Fred Davis was the defending champion, having won the 1956 World Professional Match-play Championship 38–35 against Pulman in the final, but he declined to take part in the 1957 event. The world snooker championship was not contested again until 1964 owing to a decline in the popularity of professional snooker making the tournament unviable.

== Background ==
The World Snooker Championship is a professional tournament and the official world championship of the game of snooker. The sport was developed in the late 19th century by British Army soldiers stationed in India. Professional English billiards player and billiard hall manager Joe Davis noticed the increasing popularity of snooker compared to billiards in the 1920s, and with Birmingham-based billiards equipment manager Bill Camkin, persuaded the Billiards Association and Control Council (BACC) to recognise an official professional snooker championship in the 1926–27 season. In 1927, the final of the first professional snooker championship was held at Camkin's Hall; Davis won the tournament by beating Tom Dennis in the final. The annual competition was not titled the World Championship until 1935, but the 1927 tournament is now referred to as the first World Snooker Championship. Davis also won the title each year until 1940, when the contest was cancelled during World War II, and again when the championship resumed in 1946, accumulating a total of 15 titles before retiring from the event.

In 1952, the World Professional Match-play Championship was created following a dispute between the Professional Billiards Players' Association (PBPA) and the BACC. In response to player complaints that the BACC was taking too large a percentage of income from the tournament, the BACC claimed that the championship "has always been, and in theory is to be, regarded as an affair of honour and a test of merit", and that "every effort is made to arrange terms advantageous to the professionals competing in the championship, compatible with securing an equitable return for the promoters of it, the B.A.& C.C." The PBPA members established an alternative competition which became known as the World Professional Match-play Championship, now recognised as world championships. There were four entrants for the 1957 World Professional Match-play Championship: John Pulman, Jackie Rea, Rex Williams, and Kingsley Kennerley. Defending champion Fred Davis, who had won the world championship in 1948, 1949 and 1951, and the five previous editions of the World Professional Match-play Championship, each year from 1952 to 1956, did not enter the 1957 tournament.

In March 1957, Pulman won the 1956/1957 News of the World Snooker Tournament, which had been a handicapped competition. With Fred Davis declining to enter the World Matchplay competition because he was taking a "rest" from it, Pulman, who had been the runner-up in the tournament in the two-previous years, was said by the Hartlepool Northern Daily Mail to be a "hot favourite" to win it in 1957.

== Summary ==
The 1957 World Professional Match-play Championship was held at Saint Helier, Jersey, from 1 to 13 April 1957, organised by the Jersey Billiards Association for the PBPA. All matches were played at the Jersey Billiards Association Match Room, Le Geyt Street, and were refereed by S. A. de Gruchy.

Rea was 4–2 ahead after the opening session, and achieved a 9–3 lead over Kennerley after the first day. The Jersey Evening Post reported that the first day's play was "generally disappointing", with the highest break in the afternoon session being only 34, made by Kennerley. The first session had an audience of only four people, and there were twelve spectators for the evening session. Rea won all six frames on the second afternoon, for 15–3, making an 85 break in the 19th frame. With the six evening frames shared between the pair, Rea led 18–6 after the second day. Rea won the first frame on the third day to achieve a winning margin at 19–6, and after dead frames, won 25–12. During the dead frames, which had an audience of around 80 people, Rea compiled the highest break of the match, a 92, in the 23rd frame.

Williams won only one frame, the fourth, in the first session against Pulman, but reduced his deficit from 1–5 after the first session to 5–7 after the second session. The highest break was 72, from Pulman. The pair each won three frames on the second afternoon, leaving Pulman 10–8 ahead, before Williams took four of the six evening frames to level the match at 12–12 after Pulman had missed several easy pots. On the last day, Pulman claimed the first three frames. Williams then won the following frame, and added another which was decided on a re-spotted black. Pulman took the session's last frame and led 16–14. In the evening, Williams won the first frame with a 65 break that the Jersey Evening Post reported "gained the most enthusiastic and sustained burst of applause of the week's play." Pulman achieved a winning margin at 19–16, and after two dead frames, during which he made breaks of 92, 77 and 50 finished 21–16 ahead.

The final was over 73 frames, played from 8 to 13 April. On the first afternoon Rea took the first frame with breaks of 23, 24, and 43. Pulman won the next two frames, then Rea claimed the following three frames to end the first session 4–2 ahead. In the evening, Pulman equalised at 4–4 by taking the first two frames, which was followed by Rea building a 7–4 lead. Pulman won the 12th frame, then Rea claimed the day's last frame to lead 8–5. The highest break of the first day was 88, made by Rea in the fourth frame. Pulman won the first three frames on the second day to level at 8–8, and compiled a break of 101, the first century break of the tournament, in the second frame. Rea responded by claiming the next three frames, before Pulman added the last frame of the day, leaving Rea 14–12 in front.

Rea increased his advantage to four frames at 18–14 after the third morning session, but Pulman won five of the evening's seven frames, including the last four of the day, to move to one frame behind at 19–20. Rea had failed to pot the pink ball in the 36th frame, which would have given him a six-frame lead as he had been 20–15 up at the time.

There was just one session on the fourth day and with Pulman winning five of the seven frames he took the lead for the first time and was 24–22 up at the close. Pulman also had the best of the fifth day and, taking the afternoon session 4–2 and the evening session 4–3, thus extending his lead to 32–27. On the final day, Pulman won 5 of the 7 frames in the afternoon session to take a winning lead of 37–29. Rea won 5 of the 7 frames in the evening session to give a final score of 39–34 to Pulman. Pulman's 101 was the only century break of the final. The championship trophy was presented by Lady Coutanche. Both finalists also received six pottery goblets made in Jersey.

The final attracted an audience of about 100, and the only newspaper to carry significant coverage of it was the Jersey Evening Post. Authors Luke Williams and Paul Gadsby wrote in Masters of the Baize (2005) that "a new-found steel seemed to have developed in Pulman's game" during the final, shown by him winning several frames on the final black, and that "he displayed plenty of grit" during the match. The championship was not contested again until 1964, due to a decline in the popularity of professional snooker making the tournament unviable.

== Schedule ==
Schedule of matches for the 1957 World Professional Match-play Championship
Match	Dates	Venue, city
Jackie Rea v Kingsley Kennerley	1–3 April 1957	Saint Helier, Jersey
John Pulman v Rex Williams	4–6 April 1957	Saint Helier, Jersey
John Pulman v Jackie Rea	8–13 April 1957	Saint Helier, Jersey

== Main draw ==
Match results are shown below. Winning players and scores are denoted in bold text.

**Semi-finals**; 37 frames
**John Pulman (ENG)**	**21**
Rex Williams (ENG)	16
**Jackie Rea (NIR)**	**25**
Kingsley Kennerley (ENG)	12

**Final**; 73 frames
(England) **John Pulman**	**39**
(Northern Ireland) Jackie Rea	34
