= 1977 Pontins Professional =

Tournament information
- Dates: 30 April – 7 May 1977
- Venue: Pontin's
- City: Prestatyn
- Country: Wales
- Organisation: WPBSA
- Format: Non-Ranking event

Final
- Champion: (England) John Spencer
- Runner-up: (England) John Pulman
- Score: 7–5

The 1977 Pontins Professional was the fourth edition of the professional invitational snooker tournament which took place in May 1977 in Prestatyn, Wales.

The tournament featured twelve professional players. Eight players were eliminated in the group stage, with the other four advancing to the group play-offs.

John Spencer won the event, beating John Pulman 7–5 in the final.

== Group stage ==
- (Australia) Eddie Charlton 3–1 Doug Mountjoy (Wales)
- (Australia) Eddie Charlton 3–1 Fred Davis (England)
- (England) Fred Davis 3–0 Cliff Thorburn (Canada)
- (England) Fred Davis 3–2 Rex Williams (England)
- (South Africa) Perrie Mans 3–1 Dennis Taylor (Northern Ireland)
- (South Africa) Perrie Mans 3–1 Willie Thorne (England)
- (England) Graham Miles 3–0 Willie Thorne (England)
- (England) Graham Miles 3–0 Ray Reardon (Wales)
- (England) Graham Miles 3–1 Perrie Mans (South Africa)
- (Wales) Doug Mountjoy 3–1 Fred Davis (England)
- (Wales) Doug Mountjoy 3–1 Rex Williams (England)
- (England) John Pulman 3–0 Eddie Charlton (Australia)
- (England) John Pulman 3–1 Doug Mountjoy (Wales)
- (England) John Pulman 3–1 Rex Williams (England)
- (England) John Pulman 3–2 Fred Davis (England)
- (Wales) Ray Reardon 3–0 Dennis Taylor (Northern Ireland)
- (Wales) Ray Reardon 3–1 Graham Miles (England)
- (Wales) Ray Reardon 3–1 Perrie Mans (South Africa)
- (England) John Spencer 3–0 Ray Reardon (Wales)
- (England) John Spencer 3–1 Graham Miles (England)
- (England) John Spencer 3–1 Perrie Mans (South Africa)
- (Northern Ireland) Dennis Taylor 3–0 Willie Thorne (England)
- (Northern Ireland) Dennis Taylor 3–1 Graham Miles (England)
- (Northern Ireland) Dennis Taylor 3–1 John Spencer (England)
- (Canada) Cliff Thorburn 3–0 John Pulman (England)
- (Canada) Cliff Thorburn 3–1 Doug Mountjoy (Wales)
- (Canada) Cliff Thorburn 3–1 Eddie Charlton (Australia)
- (Canada) Cliff Thorburn 3–2 Rex Williams (England)
- (England) Willie Thorne 3–1 John Spencer (England)
- (England) Rex Williams 3–1 Eddie Charlton (Australia)

== Knockout stage ==
Group play-offs Best of 3 frames
(England) John Spencer	2
(England) Graham Miles	0
(England) John Pulman	2
(Canada) Cliff Thorburn	1

Final; Best of 13 frames
(England) John Spencer	7
(England) John Pulman	5
