= 1975 Canadian Open =

Canadian Open
Tournament information
- Dates: 13 August – 1 September 1975
- Venue: Canadian National Exhibition Stadium
- City: Toronto
- Country: Canada
- Organisation: Snooker Canada
- Format: Non-ranking event
- Total prize fund: $10,000
- Winner's share: $5,000
- Highest break: Cliff Thorburn (CAN) (142)

Final
- Champion: (Northern Ireland) Alex Higgins
- Runner-up: (England) John Pulman
- Score: 15–7

The 1975 Canadian Open was the second edition of the professional invitational snooker tournament, the Canadian Open, which took place between 13 August and 1 September 1975. It was also referred to as the "Plus Cigarettes International".

Alex Higgins won the title defeating John Pulman 15–7 in the final. 81 players entered. There was a total prize fund of $10,000, with $5,000 awarded to the winner and $2,000 for the runner-up. Cliff Thorburn compiled the highest break of the tournament, 142.

== Main draw ==
Results of the tournament are shown below. Numbers in parentheses indicate seedings.

Last 16; Best of 17 frames
(Northern Ireland) Alex Higgins (4)	9
(Canada) Eric Mortenson	1
(Northern Ireland) Dennis Taylor (5)	9
(Canada) Wayne Jackson	3
(England) Graham Miles (3)	9
(Canada) Dave Ridge	5
(Canada) Cliff Thorburn (2)	9
(Canada) Gerry Watson	8
(England) John Pulman (6)	9
(Canada) Gabe Tarini	4
(Canada) Bill Werbeniuk (7)	9
(Canada) Eddy Agha	0
(England) Willie Thorne (8)	9
(Canada) Jerry Kapchinsky	4
(England) John Spencer (1)	9
(Canada) Leo Levitt	7

Quarter-finals; Best of 17 frames
(Northern Ireland) Alex Higgins	9
(Northern Ireland) Dennis Taylor	7
(England) Graham Miles	9
(Canada) Cliff Thorburn	6
(England) John Pulman	9
(Canada) Bill Werbeniuk	8
(England) Willie Thorne	9
(England) John Spencer	7

Semi-finals; Best of 17 frames
(Northern Ireland) Alex Higgins	9
(England) Graham Miles	4
(England) John Pulman	9
(England) Willie Thorne	6

Final; Best of 29 frames
(Northern Ireland) Alex Higgins	15
(England) John Pulman	7
