= 1956 World Professional Match-play Championship =

Snooker tournament

Tournament information
- Dates: 9 January – 10 March 1956
- Final venue: Tower Circus
- Final city: Blackpool
- Country: England
- Organisation: Professional Billiards Players' Association
- Highest break: Rex Williams (ENG) (141)

Final
- Champion: Fred Davis (ENG)
- Runner-up: John Pulman (ENG)
- Score: 38–35

Venues

The 1956 World Professional Match-play Championship was a snooker tournament that took place from 9 January to 10 March 1956 with the final being held at the Tower Circus in Blackpool, England from 5 to 10 March. Fred Davis won his eighth and last world snooker title by defeating John Pulman by 38 frames to 35 in the final. Pulman led 31–29 going into the last day of the final on 10 March, but Davis won 8 of the first 10 frames on that day to take a winning lead of 37–33. The event, organised by the Professional Billiards Players' Association, is now recognised as an edition of the World Snooker Championship.

There were four participants. Rex Williams made the highest break of the tournament with 141, a championship record, in frame 48 of his semi-final match against Fred Davis in Aston. Pulman defeated Jackie Rea in the other semi-final, which was held in Belfast.

== Background ==
The World Snooker Championship is a professional tournament and the official world championship of the game of snooker. The sport was developed in the late 19th century by British Army soldiers stationed in India. Professional English billiards player and billiard hall manager Joe Davis noticed the increasing popularity of snooker compared to billiards in the 1920s, and with Birmingham-based billiards equipment manager Bill Camkin, persuaded the Billiards Association and Control Council (BACC) to recognise an official professional snooker championship in the 1926–27 season. In 1927, the final of the first professional snooker championship was held at Camkin's Hall; Davis won the tournament by beating Tom Dennis in the final. The annual competition was not titled the World Championship until 1935, but the 1927 tournament is now referred to as the first World Snooker Championship. Davis also won the title each year until 1940, when the contest was cancelled during World War II, and again when the championship resumed in 1946, accumulating a total of 15 titles before retiring from the event.

In 1952, the World Professional Match-play Championship was created following a dispute between the Professional Billiards Players' Association (PBPA) and the BACC. In response to player complaints that the BACC was taking too large a percentage of income from the tournament, the BACC claimed that the championship "has always been, and in theory is to be, regarded as an affair of honour and a test of merit", and that "every effort is made to arrange terms advantageous to the professionals competing in the championship, compatible with securing an equitable return for the promoters of it, the B.A.& C.C." The PBPA members established an alternative competition which became known as the World Professional Match-play Championship, now recognised as world championships. There were four entrants for the 1956 World Professional Match-play Championship: John Pulman, Jackie Rea, Rex Williams, and Fred Davis, who had won the world championship in 1948, 1949 and 1951, and the four previous editions of the World Professional Match-play Championship, each year from 1952 to 1955. Joe Davis and Walter Donaldson played in the 1955/1956 News of the World Snooker Tournament, that took place from October 1955 to February 1956, but did not enter the Match-play Championship.

== Summary ==
=== Semi-finals ===
John Pulman and Jackie Rea played in the first semi-final, at the R.A.O.B. Club, Belfast, from 9 to 13 January 1956. Pulman won the first three frames, making a 55 break in the second frame and a 70 in the third frame. He finished the first session 4–2 ahead, and led 7–5 at the end of the first day. Each player won three frames in the second day's afternoon session. Rea added the first of the evening, before Pulman took four consecutive frames to lead 14–9, compiling a break of 87 in the process. Rea made a break of 89 in winning the 24th frame. Pulman extended his lead to six frames by winning the first two of the third day, and was still six ahead at 18–12 by the session's conclusion, and his lead over the evening to eight frames, at 22–14. On the fourth day, Pulman won seven of the twelve frames to lead 29–19, including four of the six in the afternoon session. The correspondent for the Northern Whig commented that "the snooker was not of very good quality ... Pulman impressed as the more consistent player of the two. Rea being far too impetuous at times and breaking down when he should have scored from good positions." Pulman secured victory at 31–25 after winning the second and third frames on the final day, and finished 36–25 ahead after dead frames were played.

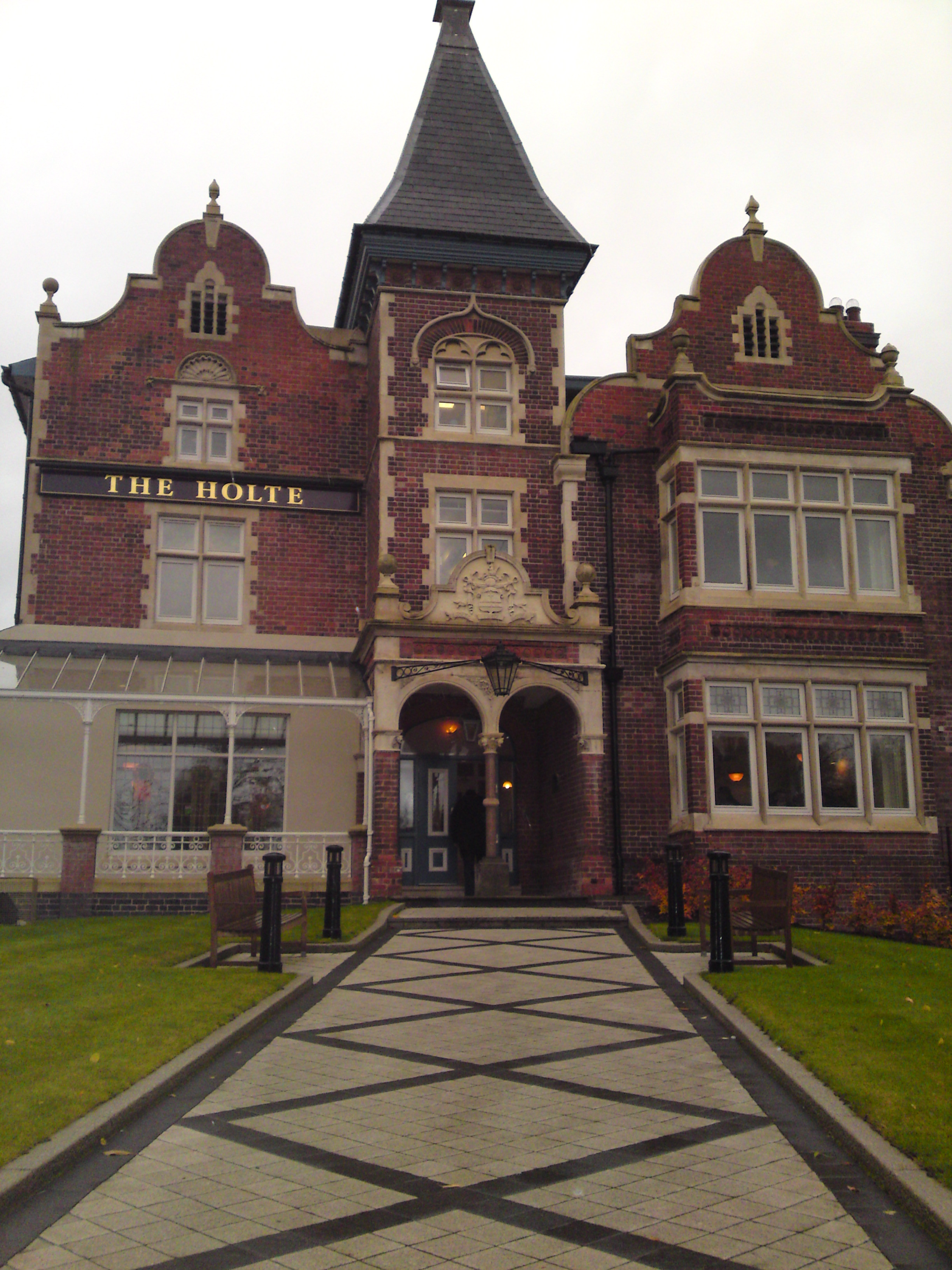
The Holte Hotel (pictured in 2008) was the venue for the semi-final between Fred Davis and Rex Williams.

The second semi-final, between Fred Davis and Rex Williams, was staged from 23 to 27 January at the Holte Hotel, Aston. Williams took the first frame, and, after Davis had won the second, moved into a 3–1 lead. A break of 90 from Davis reduced the deficit to one frame, and the match was level when Davis added the sixth frame. In the second session, Davis compiled a break of 102 in the seventh frame of the match, and won the following five frames for a 9–3 lead at the end of the first day. The players each won three frames on the second afternoon, and also on the second evening, leaving Davis 15–9 ahead. The day's highest break was a 54 made by Davis in frame fifteen, but Williams won that frame by 82 points to 54. Davis opened up an 11-frame lead by taking the first five frames on day three, and extended this to twelve at 24–12 by the end of the day, having made a 104 break in the evening session. His lead was increased to 14 frames by adding the first two frames of the fourth day, before Williams reduced the gap to ten frames at 19–29, compiling a 141 break in the 48th frame. This stood as the highest break ever recorded in a version of the world snooker championship, until it was bettered by one point by Williams in 1965. On the last day, Williams took four of the first five frames, but Davis achieved a winning margin at 31–23. Following the dead frames played, the score was 35–26.

=== Final ===
The final was over 73 frames, and was played from 5 to 10 March at the Tower Circus, Blackpool. Davis won the opening frame and took a 4–2 lead during the afternoon session, making a break of 96 in the fourth frame. Pulman, who compiled a break of 85 in the ninth frame, led 7–5 after the opening day. After the second afternoon session, the players were level at 9–9, Davis having compiled a 104 break in the 18th frame. Davis won the first frame on the second evening, but Pulman then claimed five consecutive frames to lead 14–10 after the second day. Davis reduced his deficit to two frames at 19–17 after the third day, during which he made his second century break of the final, a 102, in the afternoon session.

Pulman won four of the six frames on the fourth afternoon, to lead 23–19. In the evening, Davis took the first three frames and the fifth frame, leaving Pulman 25–23 ahead. The following day, the scores were level at both 25–25 and 27–27. Pulman constructed a 104 break in the fourth frame of the afternoon. He won four of the six evening frames, to take a 31–29 lead into the last day. On the sixth day, Davis won five of the six frames in the afternoon session to lead 34–32. He then added three of the first four frames in the evening to achieve a winning margin at 37–33. After dead frames, the final score was 38–35.

According to authors Luke Williams and Paul Gadsby, "It was, Pulman admitted, the bitterest disappointment of his career." Snooker commentator Ted Lowe wrote in 1984 that Pulman "looked like a winner ... when leading 31–29 at the start of the final day but experience told and Fred ended up champion". In 2012, snooker historian Clive Everton claimed that Pulman "in retrospect believed that it had done him no good to spend two hours in bed with the daughter of a snooker dignitary just prior to the resumption of play [on the last day]". It was the last of eight world snooker titles won by Davis, who chose not to enter the 1957 World Professional Match-play Championship.

== Schedule ==
Schedule of matches for the 1956 World Professional Match-play Championship
Match	Dates	Venue, city	Ref
John Pulman v Jackie Rea	9–13 January 1956	R.A.O.B. Club, Belfast	
Fred Davis v Rex Williams	23–27 January 1956	Holte Hotel, Aston	
Fred Davis v John Pulman	5–10 March 1956	Tower Circus, Blackpool	

== Main draw ==
Match results are shown below. Winning players and scores are denoted in bold text.

**Semi-finals**; 61 frames		**Final**; 73 frames
**Fred Davis (ENG)**	**35**
Rex Williams (ENG)	26	(England) **Fred Davis**	**38**
**John Pulman (ENG)**	**36**	(England) John Pulman	35
Jackie Rea (NIR)	25

== Final ==
Available details about the final are below.

Final: Best-of-73 frames 5–10 March 1956 at the Tower Circus, Blackpool. Numbers in bold represent winning scores and numbers in brackets represent breaks.
**Fred Davis** (England)					**38**–35		John Pulman (England)						
5 March (first day)
Frame	1	2	3	4	5	6	7	8	9	10	11	12	
Davis	**135**	25	46	**102** (96)	**88**	**70**	36	**61**	35	61	13	43	
Pulman	1	**63**	**69**	33	60	51	**72**	59	**85** (85)	**64**	**100**	**81**	
Frames (Davis first)	1–0	1–1	1–2	2–2	3–2	4–2	4–3	5–3	5–4	5–5	5–6	5–7	
6 March (second day)
Frame	1	2	3	4	5	6	7	8	9	10	11	12	
Davis					70	? (104)	**74**	39	27	58	54	53	
Pulman					**71**	?	48	**69**	**83**	**62**	**64**	**66**	
Frames (Davis first)				8–8	8–9	9–9	10–9	10–10	10–11	10–12	10–13	10–14	
7 March (third day)
Frame	1	2	3	4	5	6	7	8	9	10	11	12	
Davis	61	33	**130**	**78**	**61**	**98**	17	**82**	**89**	**83**	17	36	
Pulman	**80**	**54**	11	43	35	26	**68**	32	39	43	**83**	**65**	
Frames (Davis first)	10–15	10–16	11–16	12–16	13–16	14–16	14–17	15–17	16–17	17–17	17–18	17–19	
8 March (fourth day)
Frame	1	2	3	4	5	6	7	8	9	10	11	12	
Davis	25	**85**	**96**	5	15	46	**92**	**67**	**94**	19	**74**	33	
Pulman	**71**	40	28	**97**	**96**	**86**	26	55	20	**79**	66	**72**	
Frames (Davis first)	17–20	18–20	19–20	19–21	19–22	19–23	20–23	21–23	22–23	22–24	23–24	23–25	
9 March (fifth day)
Frame	1	2	3	4	5	6	7	8	9	10	11	12	
Davis	**83**	**81**	8	22	**139**	**82**	15	17	48	**71**	53	**87**	
Pulman	31	36	**90**	**106**	5	19	**63**	**85**	**66**	35	**73**	37	
Frames (Davis first)	24–25	25–25	25–26	25–27	26–27	27–27	27–28	27–29	27–30	28–30	28–31	29–31	
10 March (sixth day)
Frame	1	2	3	4	5	6	7	8	9	10	11	12	13
Davis													
Pulman													
Frames (Davis first)						34–32				**37**–33			38–35
**Fred Davis wins the 1956 World Professional Match-play Championship**
