= 1972 Ford Series Tournament =

Tournament information
- Dates: 11 to 13 December 1972
- Venue: Stanley Institute
- City: Burscough
- Country: United Kingdom
- Organisation: WPBSA
- Format: Non-Ranking event
- Total prize fund: £400
- Highest break: 114, Alex Higgins (NIR)

Final
- Champion: Alex Higgins (NIR)
- Runner-up: John Pulman (ENG)
- Score: 4–2

The 1972 Ford Series Tournament was a non-ranking invitational snooker tournament, which took place at the Stanley Institute, Burscough, from 11 to 13 December 1972, sponsored by Skelmersdale Motors. Four professional players were invited: reigning world champion Alex Higgins, and former world champions Ray Reardon, John Spencer, and John Pulman. There was a prize fund of £400.

The choice of venue was criticised by a local councillor, who argued that the tournament should have been held within the town of Skelmersdale, where sponsors Skelmersdale Motors were based, rather than in Burscough; a spokesperson for the sponsors responded that no snooker tables of the necessary standard were available in the town.

Higgins won the title, defeating Pulman 4–2 in the final. He also made the highest break of the tournament, 114, during the final, having earlier made a break of 100 against Reardon.

== Main draw ==
Results for the tournament are shown below.

Semi-finals
Alex Higgins (NIR)	4
Ray Reardon (WAL)	2
John Pulman (ENG)	4
John Spencer (ENG)	3

Final
Alex Higgins (NIR)	4
John Pulman (ENG)	2
Third place
Ray Reardon (WAL)	3
John Spencer (ENG)	0
