= Fred Van Rensburg =

South African snooker player

Fred van Rensburg
Sport
- Country: South Africa
- Sport: Snooker
- Professional: 1965–1966

Fred "Freddie" van Rensburg was a South African professional snooker player.

== Career ==
Rensburg challenged John Pulman for the World Championship title in December 1965. Pulman had played a series of matches against Rex Williams in South Africa in late 1965. Rensburg lost by 12 frames to 39.

Van Rensburg also held the South African Professional Championship from 1950, taking the title from Peter Mans, and defending it on a challenge basis until 1965 when he lost it to Perrie Mans, son of Peter.
