= 1956/1957 News of the World Snooker Tournament =

News of the World Tournament
Tournament information
- Dates: 22 October 1956 – 2 March 1957
- Venue: various
- Format: Non-Ranking event
- Total prize fund: £1500

Final
- Champion: (England) John Pulman
- Runner-up: (England) Fred Davis

The 1956/1957 News of the World Snooker Tournament was a professional snooker tournament sponsored by the News of the World. The tournament was won by John Pulman who all his 5 matches. Fred Davis finished in second place ahead of Jackie Rea. Both won 3 matches but Davis won more frames overall. The News of the World Snooker Tournament ran from 1949/50 to 1959.

== Format ==
The 1956/57 event was a round-robin snooker tournament and was played from 22 October 1956 to 2 March 1957. Matches were played at various locations around the United Kingdom and also on Jersey. There were 6 competitors and a total of 15 matches. The competitors were the same as the previous year, Joe Davis, Fred Davis, Walter Donaldson, John Pulman, Jackie Rea and Rex Williams. Each match lasted three days and was the best of 37 frames except for one match played in Rochdale where there was only an evening session.

Each match was separately handicapped. Joe Davis gave Fred Davis a 10-point start each frame, Walter Donaldson 14, John Pulman 14, Jackie Rea 20 and Rex Williams 24. Fred Davis gave Walter Donaldson 10, John Pulman 10, Jackie Rea 14 and Rex Williams 17. Walter Donaldson gave John Pulman 10, Jackie Rea 12 and Rex Williams 14. John Pulman gave Jackie Rea 10 and Rex Williams 14. Jackie Rea gave Rex Williams 10 points.

== Results ==
After winning his first match 20–17, Joe Davis lost his remaining four matches 19–18 and finished in fifth place.

| Winner | Score | Loser | Date | Venue | Ref |
|---|---|---|---|---|---|
| Joe Davis | 20–17 | Rex Williams | 22–24 October | Jersey | |
| Jackie Rea | 19–18 | Joe Davis | 25–27 October | Jersey | |
| John Pulman | 21–16 | Walter Donaldson | 29–31 October | Oldham | |
| Fred Davis | 19–18 | Walter Donaldson | 5–7 November | Newcastle | |
| John Pulman | 20–17 | Rex Williams | 8–10 November | Newcastle | |
| Walter Donaldson | 19–18 | Joe Davis | 21–24,26–27 November | Rochdale | |
| Fred Davis | 24–13 | Rex Williams | 26–28 November | Birmingham | |
| Rex Williams | 24–13 | Walter Donaldson | 29 November–1 December | Birmingham | |
| Jackie Rea | 21–16 | Walter Donaldson | 17–19 December | Burroughes Hall, London | |
| John Pulman | 21–16 | Jackie Rea | 20–22 December | Burroughes Hall, London | |
| Jackie Rea | 19–18 | Fred Davis | 21–23 January | Liverpool | |
| John Pulman | 20–17 | Fred Davis | 11–13 February | Bolton | |
| Rex Williams | 21–16 | Jackie Rea | 14–16 February | Bolton | |
| John Pulman | 19–18 | Joe Davis | 25–27 February | Houldsworth Hall, Manchester | |
| Fred Davis | 19–18 | Joe Davis | 28 February–2 March | Houldsworth Hall, Manchester | |

Table

| Pos | Player | Pld | MW | FW | FL | Prize |
|---|---|---|---|---|---|---|
| 1 | (England) John Pulman | 5 | 5 | 101 | 84 | ? |
| 2 | (England) Fred Davis | 5 | 3 | 97 | 88 | ? |
| 3 | (Northern Ireland) Jackie Rea | 5 | 3 | 91 | 94 | ? |
| 4 | (England) Rex Williams | 5 | 2 | 92 | 93 | ? |
| 5 | (England) Joe Davis | 5 | 1 | 92 | 93 | ? |
| 6 | (Scotland) Walter Donaldson | 5 | 1 | 82 | 103 | ? |

The positions were determined firstly by the number of matches won (MW) and, in the event of a tie, the number of frames won (FW).

== Broadcasting ==
The BBC showed a short, 30 minute, TV programme of the final day of the final match from Houldsworth Hall, Manchester. The commentator was Sidney Smith.
