= John Pulman =

English former professional snooker player, 8-time world champion (last 1968)

Personal information
- Born: 12 December 1923 Teignmouth, Devon, England
- Died: 25 December 1998 (aged 75) Northampton, England

Sport
- Country: England
- Sport: Snooker
- Professional: 1946–1981
- Highest ranking: 7 (1977/78)

Tournament wins
- World Championship: 8 times; 1957, and won 7 challenges from 1964–68

Herbert John Pulman (12 December 1923 – 25 December 1998) was an English professional snooker player who was the World Snooker Champion from 1957 to 1968. He first won the title at the 1957 Championship and retained it across seven challenges from 1964 to 1968, three of them against Fred Davis and two against Rex Williams. When the tournament reverted to a knockout event in 1969, he lost 18–25 in the first round to the eventual champion John Spencer. After finishing as runner-up to Ray Reardon in 1970, Pulman never again reached the final, although he was a losing semi-finalist in 1977.

He turned professional in 1946, shortly after winning the English Amateur Championship, and achieved three News of the World Snooker Tournament titles, in 1954, 1957 and 1958. An emotional player, he was prone to venting his frustration and missing important shots. He generally played attacking snooker in his early career, but he made more use of safety tactics in the 1970s.

Pulman became a television commentator towards the end of his playing career and retired from competitive play in 1981 after breaking his leg in a traffic accident. He died in 1998 following a fall down the stairs at his home. He was one of the inaugural inductees to the World Snooker Hall of Fame in 2011, alongside seven other winners of multiple world championships.

== Early life ==
Herbert John Pulman, known as John Pulman, was born on 12 December 1923 in Teignmouth, Devon, England. His father was Ernest Charles Pulman, a master baker and confectioner, and his mother was Ernest's wife Gertrude Mary Pulman, née Kent. In 1929, Ernest Pulman sold his bakery and confectionery business, and the family moved to Plymouth, where he bought a billiard hall with two tables. Coached by his father, John Pulman started playing billiards at the age of nine and made his first billiards century break aged twelve. In his teenage years he also played snooker and participated in local league competitions. He attended Exeter Episcopal School, where he was a swimming champion and represented his county at water polo.

In 1938, Pulman entered the British Boys Billiards Championship but left his cue on the train on his way to the event at Burroughes Hall. He was invited to choose a cue from a selection at the venue, and he used that particular cue for the rest of his career. In his first match at the event, against Barrie Smith (later known professionally as John Barrie), Pulman was 199–196 ahead in a 200-up match (Note: A "200-up" match is one in which the first player to reach 200 points is the winner.) when he ran a coup. Smith then got the points he needed to win. The cue that Pulman had chosen included a metal plate with professional Sidney Smith's name engraved on it; he later filed Smith's name off, as he felt he could not play exhibition matches with a cue bearing another professional's name.

During World War II, Pulman was enlisted in the army for three months, making wings for Spitfires, before being discharged on medical grounds; he later told journalist Terry Smith that he had varicose veins.

== Snooker career ==
=== Early professional career (1946–1955) ===
In 1946, Pulman won the English Amateur Championship title, with a 5–3 win over Albert Brown in the final. Aged 20, Pulman was the youngest player to win the event since it was established in 1916. Working as an income tax clerk, he took the decision to become a professional player shortly after the championship, having taken advice from Joe Davis, the reigning World Champion. Later that year, he made his first two century breaks, just ten days apart.

At the start of his professional career, Pulman was living at the home of his patron Bill Lampard, who was a baker from Bristol and a member of the Billiards Association and Control Council (BA&CC). Lampard built a billiard room at his house, where Pulman was able to practise. Snooker historian Clive Everton alleged that this arrangement ended after Pulman was discovered in bed with Lampard's wife. Pulman practised playing snooker for eight hours a day over several years, in pursuit of a level of consistency that would bring him to the standard of the top professionals. Shortly after turning professional, he had started wearing spectacles for playing snooker, using the same type of swivel-lens glasses that were worn by his fellow professional Fred Davis.

Pulman made his first appearance at the World Snooker Championship in 1947, losing 14–21 to Brown in the first round of qualification. The following season, he won the qualifying section of the 1948 World Championship, progressing through the first two matches and then defeating Willie Leigh 18–17 on the final black in the deciding frame of the last qualifying match. He lost 29–42 to Clark McConachy in the first round of the main draw. Later the same year, he won the qualifying event for the 1948 Sunday Empire News Tournament and, benefitting from a points handicap, finished second in the main event behind Joe Davis. Pulman's total prize money was £400 (equivalent to £12,575 in 2025), made up of £150 for his qualifying win and £250 for his second-place finish overall.

At the 1949 World Championship, Pulman eliminated Brown in his first match but then lost 22–49 to Walter Donaldson in the semi-finals. He lost his opening match in 1950 and withdrew from the following year's championship due to influenza when trailing 14–22 against Fred Davis in their semi-final match. He also participated in the annual News of the World Snooker Tournament, which was a round-robin event with points handicaps applied, first staged in 1949/1950. He was runner-up in the 1950/1951 edition and won in 1953/1954. He married Frances Anne Hayes in April 1953.

=== World snooker championship contests (1955–1968) ===
Pulman first reached the final of the World Professional Match-play Championship, which was now effectively the world championship, in 1955. He defeated Rex Williams 22–15 in the quarter-finals and Alec Brown 37–24 in the semi-finals before losing 35–38 to Fred Davis in the final, which was played at Blackpool Tower Circus. Davis was 10–2 ahead at the end of the first day, but Pulman had narrowed the gap, at 15–9, by the end of the second day of play. Davis led 20–16 after day three, 27–21 after day four and 33–27 after day five; he won the match on the sixth day to claim the title. Pulman made three century breaks during the final: 103 on day two, another 103 on day four, and 101 in the last of the dead frames. Davis defeated him again in the 1956 final, at 33–37, with the score finishing at 35–38 after dead frames. Pulman won all five of his matches at the 1956/1957 News of the World Snooker Tournament, to take the title for a second time.

Fred Davis was not among the four entrants for the 1957 World Professional Match-play Championship. In the semi-finals, Pulman was level at 12–12 with Williams before winning the match 19–16. In the final, he trailed Jack Rea at 2–4, 5–8 and 8–11 before equalising at 11–11. Rea then opened up another lead to leave Pulman 15–20 behind. Pulman took four successive frames to narrow his deficit to 19–20, going on to take the lead 24–22, and starting the final day 32–27 ahead. He won the title at 37–29, and the score finished at 39–34 after dead frames. The tournament received little media coverage, and the championship was not staged again for another seven years. Public interest in the sport had been declining since 1946 when Joe Davis retired from competing in the world championship. In preference to finding an alternative career, Pulman continued to play exhibition matches, despite the limited income he was able to earn from this.

In 1964, the Conayes Professional Tournament was held at the Rex Williams Snooker Centre in Blackheath, being the first commercially sponsored professional snooker event since 1960. Pulman was one of the four competitors, along with Fred Davis, Rea, and Williams, and won the event. Williams was the driving force behind the revival of the World Snooker Championship in 1964, obtaining sanction for the competition after an approach to the BA&CC chairman Harold Phillips. The championship was reinstated on a challenge basis, with the first match scheduled between Pulman, who had won the most recent championship in 1957, and the challenger Fred Davis. Pulman defeated Davis 19–16 at Burroughes Hall in April 1964 to retain the title that he had claimed seven years earlier. Davis had been leading 15–12 when he failed to audibly nominate a free ball, and the referee called a foul; despite both players disagreeing with the referee's decision, he refused to change his ruling, and commentators felt that Davis's reaction led to a noticeable deterioration in the standard of his play.

Williams challenged Pulman for the title in October 1964. The match was played over 73 frames and took place from 12 to 17 October at Burroughes Hall. Williams led 8–4 at the end of the first day, but Pulman won 11 of the 12 frames on the second day to lead 15–9. He extended his lead to 31–17 after the fourth day of play, winning the match on the fifth day by taking a 37–23 lead. After playing the remaining 13 dead frames on the sixth and final day, Pulman finished 40–33 ahead.

In March 1965, Pulman retained his title in a final-frame decider by defeating his challenger Fred Davis, 37–36, winning the last two frames from 35–36 behind. This was the first time a World Championship winner had won the title in a decider frame. Williams and Pulman met again in late 1965 in a series of short matches in South Africa, where Pulman won 25 of their 47 matches. At one of the venues, where there were no spectators present, the players reportedly spun a coin to determine the winner, instead of playing the match. In late 1965, Pulman defeated a further challenger, Fred Van Rensburg, 39–12.

Fred Davis challenged Pulman for a third time in 1966, in a series of seven best-of-five-frames matches. Pulman won the series at four matches to Davis's two, also taking the seventh match to win 5–2. Pulman won the world title for the eighth time in 1968 by fending off a challenge from Eddie Charlton. After the first 30 frames, Charlton was ahead 16–14; Pulman then took five of the next six frames, three of them on the final black, leaving Charlton 17–19 behind. Pulman eventually reached a winning lead of 37–28 and finished 39–34 ahead after dead frames.

=== Later career and retirement (1968–1998) ===
In 1967, Pulman had spent time touring snooker clubs across the Midlands doing promotional work for the tobacco brand John Player, and in turn the company sponsored his 1968 world title challenge match against Eddie Charlton. The good attendances for the Pulman/Charlton match led to John Player's decision to sponsor the 1969 World Snooker Championship as a knockout tournament. The 1969 event, with its updated format, is generally regarded as the start of the modern snooker era. Unable to defend his title, Pulman was eliminated 18–25 by the eventual champion John Spencer in the first round of the competition.

He reached the final of the 1970 World Championship but lost 33–37 to Ray Reardon, having earlier recovered from 14–27 behind to almost draw level at 33–34. The following year, he failed to qualify from the round-robin stages that determined the semi-finalists, and in 1972 he lost 23–31 to the eventual champion Alex Higgins in the quarter-finals. In October 1972, he was rescued, unconscious, from a road traffic collision, but he fully recovered in time to play in the Park Drive 2000 tournament that was held less than two weeks later. That December, he was runner-up to Higgins in the 1972 Ford Series Tournament, an invitational event with four world champions in competition. The following year, he reached the final of the 1973 Norwich Union Open. His opponent, Spencer, took a 5–2 lead before Pulman won five of the next seven frames to level the match at 7–7 and force a deciding frame. Spencer led by 57 points, but Pulman then made a break of 39 before failing to pot the green ball, allowing Spencer to clear the table as far as the pink and win the match.

Pulman did not progress to the quarter-final stage of the World Championship again until 1977, the first time the event was held at the Crucible Theatre in Sheffield. He reached the semi-finals, with wins over Fred Davis and Graham Miles, before losing 16–18 to Spencer, the eventual champion. After 1977, he was unable to win another World Championship match, although he continued to enter until 1982. He reached the final of the 1977 Pontins Professional event, where he was again defeated by Spencer, 5–7. After the introduction of snooker world rankings in 1976, Pulman achieved his highest position of seventh in the 1977/1978 ranking list.

His book Tackle Snooker This Way, which had first been published in 1965, was revised and published as Tackle Snooker in 1974. Pulman and his wife Frances divorced around 1978; they had three children. He was declared bankrupt on 7 February 1979 with personal debts of £5,916 (equivalent to £29,129 in 2025). By this time, he was suffering from severe motivational problems and living in a hotel in Bromley.

He did not play professionally again after his leg was broken in five places when he was hit by a London bus in October 1981. He later said that he had already lost his enthusiasm for playing snooker by the time his accident happened. While he was being treated in hospital, he accepted an offer from ITV to work as a snooker commentator, having previously worked in that role for the BBC and for STV. He continued to commentate until his death. Everton, who had taken Pulman to court in a dispute over payment for his contribution to Pulman's Tackle Snooker, later wrote that Pulman had "the voice, the authority, and of course the knowledge" to be a good commentator.

In 1998, he fell down the stairs at home while his girlfriend was away, broke his hip, and lay on the floor unable to move for almost 24 hours. He was transferred to hospital and died soon afterwards, on 25 December 1998, aged 75.

== Playing style and influence ==
Pulman was an emotional player, prone to venting his frustration and missing important shots. For the first part of his career he generally played attacking snooker, but in the 1970s he made more use of safety tactics. Fred Davis reflected that Pulman's impatience and lapses in concentration had probably cost him frames in their world championship finals in the mid-1950s and that, as Pulman became more patient in his play, he became a stronger opponent. At 6 feet 2 inches (188 cm), Pulman was unusually tall among the leading players of the 1940s, and adapted a stance where his legs were relatively close together, meaning that more weight was transferred to his back foot than was typical among professionals. This enabled him to take full advantage of his height and his reach while playing shots.

In their 2005 book Masters of the Baize, Luke Williams and Paul Gadsby commented that Pulman "suffered the unenviable fate of being world champion for the 11-year period between 1957 and 1968 in which professional snooker all but died". Commentator Ted Lowe, who had managed Leicester Square Hall from 1947 to 1955 and was a long-time snooker commentator for BBC Television, considered that Pulman's exciting style of play and sense of humour "did a tremendous salvage job for the game when it needed it most".

Alex Higgins, the world champion in 1972 and 1982 whose popularity helped make snooker a growing sport in the 1970s and 1980s, wrote of Pulman: "If I ever had a hero as a kid, I guess it was John Pulman ... [when] I was growing up, Pulman was invincible: a brilliant potter, a tactician, and foxy in the safety department." Pulman's all-round game was also praised by Ray Reardon. John Spencer admired Pulman's aptitude when using a rest. Steve Davis, who met Pulman in a match at the 1977 Pontins Open, observed how Pulman and Reardon both adapted to the poor quality of the snooker tables rather than complaining, and he found this to be a valuable lesson.

Pulman was one of the inaugural inductees to the World Snooker Hall of Fame in 2011, alongside seven other winners of multiple world championships.

== Performance and rankings timeline ==
Performance timeline for John Pulman, 1946 to 1968
Tournament	1946/ 47	1947/ 48	1948/ 49	1949/ 50	1950/ 51	1951/ 52	1952/ 53	1953/ 54	1954/ 55	1955/ 56	1956/ 57	1957/ 58	1958/ 59	1959/ 60	1963/ 64	Oct 1964	Mar 1965	Sep–Dec 1965	Dec 1965	Apr 1966	Mar 1968	Ref.
Sunday Empire News Tournament (Note: Round-robin handicap tournament)	Not Held		2nd/5	Tournament Not Held																		
World Professional Match-play Championship	Tournament Not Held					1R	SF	SF	F	F	W	Tournament Not Held										
News of the World Snooker Tournament (Note: Snooker Plus event in 1959/60 season)	Not Held			6th/8	2nd/8	5th/9	6th/9	1st/9	7th/9	4th/6	1st/6	2nd/6	3rd/4	3rd/3	Tournament Not Held							
Conayes Professional Tournament	Tournament Not Held														W	Tournament Not Held						
World Championship (Note: Tournaments between 1964 and 1968 were challenge matches.)	LQ	QF	SF	QF	SF	A	Tournament Not Held								W	W	W	W	W	W	W	

Performance timeline for John Pulman for the modern era of snooker, from 1968/69 (Note: The "modern era" of snooker can be said to begin from the 1969 World Championship.)
Tournament	1968/ 69	1969/ 70	1970/ 71	1971/ 72	1972/ 73	1973/ 74	1974/ 75	1975/ 76	1976/ 77	1977/ 78	1978/ 79	1979/ 80	1980/ 81	Ref.
Canadian Open	Tournament Not Held						A	F	QF	1R	2R	A	A	
UK Championship	Tournament Not Held									WD (Note: Pulman withdrew due to an eye injury.)	2R	1R	1R	
The Masters	Tournament Not Held						QF	QF	1R	QF	A	A	A	
Yamaha Organs Trophy (Note: The equivalent event was called the British Gold Cup in the 1979/1980 season.)	Tournament Not Held											RR	LQ	
Park Drive 2000 (Spring)	Not Held		RR	RR	Tournament Not Held									
Park Drive 2000 (Autumn)	Not Held			RR	RR	Tournament Not Held								
Men of the Midlands	Not Held			RR	RR	Tournament Not Held								
World Masters	Tournament Not Held						RR	Tournament Not Held						
Norwich Union Open	Tournament Not Held					F	QF	Tournament Not Held						
Watney Open	Tournament Not Held						1R	Tournament Not Held						
Canadian Club Masters	Tournament Not Held							SF	Tournament Not Held					
Holsten Lager International	Tournament Not Held										1R	Not Held		
Pontins Camber Sands	Tournament Not Held											QF (Note: There were only eight players in the tournament. Pulman lost his first match.)	NH	
Pontins Professional	Tournament Not Held					QF	QF	QF	F	RR	A	A	A	
World Championship (Note: This was a ranking event from 1974.)	QF	F	RR	QF	2R	2R	2R	1R	SF	1R	LQ	1R	LQ	

Ranking timeline for John Pulman
Tournament	1968/ 69	1969/ 70	1970/ 71	1971/ 72	1972/ 73	1973/ 74	1974/ 75	1975/ 76	1976/ 77	1977/ 78	1978/ 79	1979/ 80	1980/ 81	Ref.
World ranking	No ranking system								15	7	10	14	19	

Performance Table Legend
LQ	lost in the qualifying draw	#R	lost in the early rounds of the tournament (RR = Round robin)	QF	lost in the quarter-finals
SF	lost in the semi-finals	F	lost in the final	W	won the tournament
A	did not participate in the tournament	WD	withdrew from the tournament	NH	not held

== Career finals ==
=== Amateur (1 title) ===
Amateur snooker finals contested by John Pulman
Outcome	No.	Year	Championship	Opponent in the final	Score	Ref.
Winner	1.	1946	English Amateur Championship	Albert Brown (ENG)	5–3	

=== Non-ranking finals: 26 (15 titles) ===
Legend
World Championship (Note: Known as the World Professional Match-play Championship between 1952 and 1957)

Finals contested by John Pulman, and league tournaments in which he finished in first or second place
Outcome	No.	Year	Championship	Opponent	Score	Ref.
Winner	1.	1948	Sunday Empire News Qualifying Tournament	Kingsley Kennerley (ENG)	League	
Runner-up	1.	1948	Sunday Empire News Tournament	Joe Davis (ENG)	League	
Runner-up	2.	1951	News of the World Snooker Tournament	Alec Brown (ENG)	League	
Winner	2.	1954	News of the World Snooker Tournament	Joe Davis (ENG)	League	
Runner-up	3.	1955	World Professional Match-play Championship	Fred Davis (ENG)	35–38 (Note: Davis won the match when the score reached 37–31.)	
Runner-up	4.	1956	World Professional Match-play Championship (2)	Fred Davis (ENG)	35–38 (Note: Davis won the match when the score reached 33–37.)	
Winner	3.	1957	News of the World Snooker Tournament (2)	Fred Davis (ENG)	League	
Winner	4.	1957	World Professional Match-play Championship	Jackie Rea (NIR)}	39–34 (Note: Pulman won the match when the score reached 37–29.)	
Runner-up	5.	1958	News of the World Snooker Tournament (2)	Fred Davis (ENG)	League	
Winner	5.	1964 (Note: Challenge match)	World Snooker Championship (2)	Fred Davis (ENG)	19–16	
Winner	6.	1964	World Snooker Championship (3)	Rex Williams (ENG)	40–33 (Note: Pulman won the match when the score reached 37–23.)	
Winner	7.	1964	Conayes Professional Tournament	Fred Davis (ENG)	League	
Winner	8.	1965	World Snooker Championship (4)	Fred Davis (ENG)	37–36	
Winner	9.	1965 (Note: A challenge from Williams for the title held by Pulman, held over a series of matches rather than frames)	World Snooker Championship (5)	Rex Williams (ENG)	25–22 (Note: Matches rather than frames)	
Winner	10.	1965	World Snooker Championship (6)	Fred Van Rensburg (RSA)	39–12	
Winner	11.	1966 (Note: A challenge from Davis for the title held by Pulman, held over a series of matches rather than frames)	World Snooker Championship (7)	Fred Davis (ENG)	5–2	
Winner	12.	1968	World Snooker Championship (8)	Eddie Charlton (AUS)	39–34 (Note: Pulman won the match when the score reached 37–28.)	
Runner-up	6.	1970	World Snooker Championship (3)	Ray Reardon (WAL)	35–38 (Note: Reardon won the match when the score reached 33–37.)	
Winner	13.	1972	Championship Plate (Note: For losers in the early rounds of the World Championship)	Cliff Thorburn (CAN)	16–13	
Runner-up	7.	1972	Ford Series Tournament	Alex Higgins (NIR)	2–4	
Runner-up	8.	1973	Norwich Union Open	John Spencer (ENG)	7–8	
Winner	14.	1973	Championship Plate	Cliff Thorburn (CAN)	16–12	
Runner-up	9.	1974	Championship Plate	John Spencer (ENG)	5–15	
Runner-up	10.	1975	Canadian Open	Alex Higgins (NIR)	7–15	
Winner	15.	1976	Castle Professional	Patsy Fagan (IRL)	League	
Runner-up	11.	1977	Pontins Professional	John Spencer (ENG)	5–7	
