= 1964 Conayes Professional Tournament =

Tournament information
- Dates: 16–21 March 1964
- Venue: Rex Williams Snooker Centre
- City: Blackheath
- Country: England
- Format: Non-ranking event

Final
- Champion: John Pulman (ENG)
- Runner-up: Fred Davis (ENG)

The 1964 Conayes Professional Tournament was a professional snooker tournament staged at the Rex Williams Snooker Centre in Blackheath from 16 to 21 March 1964. It was the first commercially sponsored professional snooker event since 1960, and was won by John Pulman.

There were four competitors: Pulman, Rex Williams, Jackie Rea, and Fred Davis. It was held as a round-robin, with participants each playing the other competitors twice over five frames.

== Final table ==
The final standings are shown below.

Position	Player	P	MW	ML	FW	FL
Winner	John Pulman (ENG)	6	5	1	19	11
Runner-up	Fred Davis (ENG)	6	4	2	18	12
3.	Rex Williams (ENG)	6	2	4	14	16
4.	Jackie Rea (NIR)	6	1	5	9	21

== Match results ==
Player	Score	Player	Ref.
John Pulman (ENG)	3–2	Jackie Rea (NIR)	
Fred Davis (ENG)	3–2	Rex Williams (ENG)	
Rex Williams (ENG)	3–2	John Pulman (ENG)	
Fred Davis (ENG)	3–2	Jackie Rea (NIR)	
Rex Williams (ENG)	5–0	Jackie Rea (NIR)	
John Pulman (ENG)	3–2	Fred Davis (ENG)	
Fred Davis (ENG)	4–1	Rex Williams (ENG)	
John Pulman (ENG)	4–1	Jackie Rea (NIR)	
Fred Davis (ENG)	4–1	Jackie Rea (NIR)	
John Pulman (ENG)	4–1	Rex Williams (ENG)	
John Pulman (ENG)	3–2	Fred Davis (ENG)	
Jackie Rea (NIR)	3–2	Rex Williams (ENG)	
