= 1964–68 World Snooker Championships =

Professional snooker world championship tournaments

World Snooker Championship (1964–68)
Tournament information
- Country: United Kingdom / South Africa
- Established: 1964
- Organisation(s): Billiards Association and Control Council
- Format: Challenge
- Final year: 1968
- Final champion: John Pulman

Since 1927 the World Snooker Championship had been played as a single-elimination tournament, but between 1964 and 1968, it was defended over seven challenge matches. Following a hiatus after the 1957 World Professional Match-play Championship, the event was revived by Rex Williams on a challenge basis, with the champion being opposed by prominent players. This began in 1964, organised by the Billiards Association and Control Council. The 1957 champion John Pulman contested and won all seven challenge matches against various opponents in the next five years, until the tournament reverted to a knock-out format in 1969.

Each match was played over differing lengths and locations, with some being played over a series of matches rather than frames. Three of the matches were played at the Burroughes Hall in London, England; two across South Africa; one in St George's Hall, Liverpool, and the final match in Bolton. The highest break made over the series was a 142 made by Williams in the 25–22 match loss to Pulman.

== Background ==
The World Snooker Championship is a professional tournament and the official world championship of the game of snooker. The sport's origin dates to the late 19th century and British Army soldiers stationed in India. Snooker gained in popularity in across the British Isles. The championship had traditionally been played as a single-elimination tournament annually since 1927 with a hiatus during World War II between 1940 and 1946. Known as the World Professional Match-play Championship in 1957 the event failed to generate interest from the top professional players, with defending champion Fred Davis failing to enter. The event was won by John Pulman, but with waning interest and the highest ranked players not playing the event was not held after 1957.

English player Rex Williams ran a four player tournament in Blackheath in 1964, the first commercially sponsored professional snooker event since 1960. This and taking Billiards Association and Control Council (BA&CC) chairman Harold Phillips out to lunch led to the BA&CC allowing Williams to run a revival of the World Snooker Championship. The championship would be defended on a challenge basis, with defending champion Pulman facing a prominent snooker professional. The winner of the match would then become the new champion. The agreement between the BA&CC and the players in 1964 stated that there should be a minimum side stake of £50 involved, that matches could be of any duration agreed by both participants and that the challenger would be responsible for finding a suitable venue.

== Summary ==
=== 1964 ===
The World Snooker Championship was revived in 1964 with a match between 40-year-old John Pulman and 50-year-old Fred Davis. It was a best-of-37 frames match, played over three days from 20 to 22 April at Burroughes Hall in London, England. Davis had won the official championship three times and the World Professional Match-play Championship five times. He had not taken part in the last championship in 1957, which Pulman had won. Pulman took an early 4–2 lead, but Davis was ahead 7–5 at the end of the first day and maintained his two-frame advantage after the second day, leading 13–11. Davis made a break of 108 on the afternoon of the final day, but Pulman won four of the six frames in the session to level the match at 15–15. He then won the first three frames of the evening session to lead 18–15 and, although Davis won the next frame, Pulman took the fifth to win the title 19–16.

Six months after winning the first challenge match, John Pulman was challenged by organiser Rex Williams in another match held at Burroughes Hall. This consisted of a best-of-73 frames match played over six days, from 12 to 17 October 1964. Williams led 8–4 at the end of the first day, but Pulman won 11 of the 12 frames on the second day to go ahead 15–9, extending his lead to 31–17 after four days. Pulman won the match on the fifth day with a 37–23 winning lead, making a break of 109 in frame 57. The remaining 13 dead frames were played on the final day with Pulman finishing 40–33 ahead.

=== March 1965 ===
Fred Davis challenged John Pulman for the world title in March 1965. The match was again 73 frames long, played over six days from 15 to 21 March at Burroughes Hall in London. The two players were closely matched throughout. Davis led 7–5 after the first day, but Pulman had taken the lead 13–11 by the end of the second day and pulled further ahead on the third, before Davis recovered to level the match at 18–18. Pulman made a break of 100 on the fourth day; they won six frames apiece to level the score once again at 24–24. The pair were still tied after the fifth day at 30–30, with Davis making a break of 105. Pulman eventually won the match 37–36.

=== South Africa matches ===
In September 1965, John Pulman and Rex Williams left England to play a series of 51 seven-frame matches in South Africa for the World Championship. The number of matches was later reduced to 49 and in December Pulman took a winning lead of 25–20 to retain the title. Eventually only 47 matches were played, with Pulman winning the series 25–22. In the 24th match of the series, played in November in the South African city of East London, Williams compiled a break of 142, breaking the official tournament record of 136 set by Joe Davis in 1946. Although equalled by Bill Werbeniuk in 1979, this remained the highest break at the World Championship until Doug Mountjoy compiled a 145 in the 1981 tournament.

After winning this series of matches, Pulman played South African Fred Van Rensburg in December 1965, winning the match 39–12. The winner of the June 1965 South African Professional Championship was supposed to be given the opportunity to challenge for the world title, with that match being sponsored by brandy company Richelieu et Cie. Although Perrie Mans defeated Van Rensburg 13–11 in the final, it was Van Rensberg who was given the opportunity. This decision was unpopular and contributed to a lack of coverage in the South African press of the match. Little is known about the match, except that Pulman led 9–1, 15–5 and 24–6 on his way to victory. In January 1966, Pulman and Williams played a five-day 35-frame match against Van Rensburg and amateur Manuel Francisco, taking a winning 18–7 lead on the fourth day; the match ending 24–11.

=== April 1966 matches ===
Davis met John Pulman for a third challenge in April 1966, in a series of matches promoted by the Lancashire Billiard Traders' Association. There were seven best-of-five frame matches with the player who won four matches winning the championship. The matches were all played in the concert room of St George's Hall, Liverpool from 18 to 23 April. Pulman won the first three matches, 3–2, 4–1 and 4–1, with Davis winning the fourth and fifth matches 3–2. On 22 April Pulman achieved victory by winning the sixth match, 4–2. He won the last match the following day to finish with five wins to Davis's two.

=== March 1968 ===
Australian player Eddie Charlton challenged John Pulman in Bolton for a 73-frame match played from 4 to 9 March 1968. Pulman won the opening frame with a break of 77, but was 2–4 in arrears at the end of the first session. Charlton then extended the lead to 6–2, before Pulman won four consecutive frames to level at 6–6 by the end of the opening day's play. Pulman also won the first three frames on the second day, with Charlton taking the following two. The pair each took two of the next four frames as the score went from Pulman 9–8 ahead to 13–11 ahead at the end of the second day. In the 21st frame, after Pulman had potted the first red, Charlton potted the 14 remaining reds, with seven blacks, six pinks and a green, and then all the colours except the black, for a break of 122.

On the third day, Charlton won five of the six frames in the afternoon session to lead 16–14. In the evening session, Pulman drew level at 16–16. Charlton won the 33rd frame, and looked likely to win the 34th as well after making a break of 52, but Pulman eventually won the frame on the black. Pulman then won the last two frame of the day, with the last frame of the day also being decided on the final black, meaning that Pulman retained a 19–17 lead after the third day. Pulman won five of six frames in the afternoon session of the fourth day, and four of six in the evening session, with his good safety play often leading to Charlton leaving him good opportunities, and so extended his lead to 28–20 after the fourth day. With the players both winning six frames on the fifth day, it ended with Pulman leading 34–26, needing three of the remaining 13 frames. Pulman won three of the first five frames on the final afternoon to win the match 37–28. The remaining eight dead frames were played, the final score being 39–34.

This was the last challenge match, as the event reverted to a traditional tournament for the 1969 World Snooker Championship, and except for a round-robin stage at the 1971 World Snooker Championship, the event has been played as a single-elimination tournament since. Pulman had been touring snooker clubs as promotional work for the tobacco brand John Player, and the company had sponsored his match against Charlton. The good attendances for the challenge match led to John Player deciding to sponsor the 1969 World Snooker Championship as a knockout tournament.

== Results ==
Date	Champion	Score	Challenger	Venue	High break	Ref.
Apr 1964	John Pulman (ENG)	19–16	Fred Davis (ENG)	Burroughes Hall, London	112 (Pulman)	
Oct 1964	John Pulman (ENG)	40–33	Rex Williams (ENG)	Burroughes Hall, London, England	107 (Williams)	
Mar 1965	John Pulman (ENG)	37–36	Fred Davis (ENG)	Burroughes Hall, London, England		
Sep–Dec 1965	John Pulman (ENG)	25–22 (Note: The title was decided over a series of matches rather than frames.)	Rex Williams (ENG)	Various venues, South Africa	142 (Williams)	
Dec 1965	John Pulman (ENG)	39–12	Fred Van Rensburg (SAF)	Various venues, South Africa		
Apr 1966	John Pulman (ENG)	5–2	Fred Davis (ENG)	St George's Hall, Liverpool	85 (Davis)	
Mar 1968	John Pulman (ENG)	39–34	Eddie Charlton (AUS)	Co-operative Hall, Bolton	122 (Charlton)	
