= Fred Davis (snooker player) =

English former professional snooker player, 8-time world champion

Fred Davis OBE
- Davis with the World Snooker Championship trophy in 1948

Personal information
- Born: 14 August 1913 Chesterfield, Derbyshire, England
- Died: 16 April 1998 (aged 84) Denbighshire, Wales

Sport
- Country: England
- Sport: Snooker
- Professional: 1929–1993
- Highest ranking: 4 (1976–77)
- Best ranking finish: Semi-final (x2)

Tournament wins
- World Championship: 1948; 1949; 1951; 1952; 1953; 1954; 1955; 1956

Fred Davis (14 August 1913 – 16 April 1998) was an English professional player of snooker and English billiards. He was an eight-times World Snooker Championship winner from 1948 to 1956, and a twice winner of the World Billiards Championship. He was the younger brother of 15-time world snooker champion Joe Davis; the pair were the only two players to win both snooker and English billiards world championships, and Fred is second on the list of those holding most world snooker championship titles, behind Joe.

Davis' professional career started in 1929 at the age of 15 as a billiards player. He competed in his first world snooker championship in 1937 and reached the final three years later, losing to Joe by 36–37. From 1947, Davis played in five straight finals against Scottish player Walter Donaldson, winning three. When the event merged into the World Professional Match-play Championship in 1952, Davis won five more championships, defeating Donaldson three times and then John Pulman twice.

Davis won the World Billiards championship twice in 1980, defeating Rex Williams in the May event, and later Mark Wildman in the November event. With the beginning of the snooker world rankings in 1976, Davis was ranked fourth in the world, and remained on the professional tour until 1993 when, aged 80, he retired due to arthritis in his left knee. He died in 1998 after a fall in his home in Denbighshire, Wales.

== Early life ==
Fred Davis was born in Chesterfield, Derbyshire on 14 August 1913, the youngest of six children of coalminer-turned-pub landlord Fred Davis and his wife Ann Eliza, née Clark. His snooker-playing brother Joe, 12 years his senior, was the eldest of the six siblings. Joe actively discouraged Fred's professional ambitions, telling Fred that he was not good enough to pursue a professional career. Fred learned to play on a miniature table, a Christmas gift from his parents. Fred instead played English billiards which he later called "his first love", and he won the British Boys Under-16 Billiards Championship in 1929. In 1929, he turned professional automatically under the rules of the Billiards Association and Control Council. By the time he was ready to play competitive billiards, the sport was in sharp decline, although he did defeat Kingsley Kennerley to win the United Kingdom Professional Billiards Championship in 1951. Davis remarked that, once snooker had come to the fore, he assumed he would never play another billiards match.

== Career ==
=== Pre-war career ===
After a career in billiards in his youth, Davis concentrated on snooker. He first played in the World Snooker Championship in 1937 but lost 17–14 to Welshman Bill Withers in the first round, a defeat that Davis put down to ignoring his worsening eyesight. His brother Joe considered this defeat an affront to the family honour, and hammered Withers 30–1 in the next round. Joe's fury with his brother's performance persuaded Fred to consult an optician, who devised a pair of glasses with swivel lens joints to help his play. He reached the semi-finals in 1938 and 1939 before reaching the final in 1940, losing 36–37. Davis was called up on 20 July 1940 to serve in the British Army for the Second World War, only five days after his wedding.

=== Post-war career ===
Having dominated snooker from 1927 to 1946, Joe Davis retired from the World Snooker Championship after his 1946 victory. Fred reached the final the following year, but lost 62–82 to Scot Walter Donaldson. The pair made up the final for five straight years until 1951, with Davis winning in 1948, 1949 and 1951. Joe Davis had been undefeated in the world championships, but Fred would go on to be the only player to beat Joe on level terms – a feat he achieved four times between 1948 and 1954, despite Joe previously telling Fred that he would never beat him. Snooker remained a huge attraction at this time, and crowds filled Blackpool Tower Circus to see Davis beat Donaldson 84–61 in the 1948 final and 80–65 in the 1949 final. However, times were changing, and from 1950 matches became shorter. Donaldson beat Davis for the last time to win the 1950 title, 51–46.

As defending champion, Davis did not play in the 1952 event, which was only contested by two players. Following a disagreement between some of the players and the governing body, Davis played in an alternative tournament – the World Professional Match-play Championship. Davis then won each of the first five championships. Davis won the first three of these events over Donaldson, but when Davis won the 1954 event with a 39–21 victory over Donaldson, it was clear there was a decline in interest as only five players entered the championship; Donaldson then retired.

After defeating John Pulman in two close finals in 1955 and 1956, Davis chose not to play in the 1957 Championship—held in Jersey and, for financial reasons, featuring just four entrants—thus leaving the path clear for Pulman to win the event. After the war Davis and his wife had invested in a hotel in Llandudno, and this gave them some financial security away from snooker. This proved a wise move; by the early 1960s Davis was playing exhibitions in aid of cancer charities, but soon even this limited amount of snooker activity dried up. Following tours of Canada and Australia (where he won an international tournament in 1960) and after an exhibition in Pontefract where he performed in front of only a handful of people, Davis effectively went into retirement. He hardly played for four seasons before being contacted by Rex Williams, who was keen to restart interest in snooker. Under Williams, the championships were resumed in 1964 on a challenge basis. Davis challenged Pulman on three occasions, but lost in 1964 by 19–16, in 1965 by 36–37 and in 1966 by five matches to two.

=== Modern era ===
The revival of the World Championship as a single-elimination tournament in 1969 saw Davis defeat future world champion Ray Reardon 25–24 before losing 37–24 to Gary Owen in the semi-finals. Davis's match with Reardon would earn a place in the Guinness Book of Records as the longest recorded snooker session and Reardon would later note that he learned more from that match than he had in the previous 20 years playing the sport. That same year BBC TV started its Pot Black series. Davis's familiarity with long matches contested over several weeks in his prime meant he was not immediately suited to the single-frame format of the event; however, he adapted well to it, finishing as runner-up to John Spencer in the 1971 series. He also achieved the highest break in the 1970 (54), 1971 (73) and 1975 (87) series.

Soon after winning a Professional Snooker Association of Canada's Invitation Event, in which he defeated Paul Thornley in the final in May 1970, Davis suffered the first of two heart attacks, and did not participate in the 1970 World Championship, which was held in Australia and won by John Spencer. He lost 31–21 to Spencer in his first match in the 1972 championship, but defeated David Greaves 16–1 in the second round of the 1973 championship before losing to Alex Higgins, the defending champion, 16–14 in the quarter-finals, a match most notable for a leak in the roof which forced rain to stop play while a cover was found and the position of each ball marked.

Davis gained his revenge in 1974, when he beat Higgins 15–14 in the quarter-finals, having earlier beaten Bill Werbeniuk 15–5. This return match with Higgins also contained a notable incident when the referee, Jim Thorpe, called a push-shot in frame 25, a decision to which Higgins vehemently objected, swearing at the referee. Higgins blamed his subsequent defeat on the incident, but never blamed Davis for any part of it, clearly stating his admiration for Davis for playing so well following his second heart attack. Davis, for his part, also praised Higgins for his "sportmanship". However, Davis lost 15–3 to eventual champion Reardon in the semi-finals.

In 1975, Davis travelled to Australia to compete in the World Championship, where he played Dennis Taylor, but lost by a single frame, 15–14. The 1975 Watney Open in Leeds provided some consolation, and Davis beat Patsy Fagan 13–9 and John Spencer 13–12 before losing 17–11 in the final to Alex Higgins. Davis stated that a win over Spencer convinced him that he could still compete at the highest level of tournament play. World rankings were introduced in 1976. Despite Davis's abilities peaking long before this, he was still ranked number 4 that season. In 1977 Davis was ranked number 9, rising to 6 during both the 1978 and 1979 seasons; he maintained his form as the tour expanded, still being ranked inside the top 16 players in 1982, aged 67, and only falling outside the top 64 in 1988, aged 74. Although Davis lost 15–13 to Eddie Charlton in the quarter-finals of the 1976 World Championship, having beaten Werbeniuk 15–12 in round one, he came close to winning his first professional title for twenty years at the 1976 Pontins Professional. With victories over Willie Thorne, 7–4 in the quarter-finals, and Graham Miles, 7–2 in the semi-finals, he faced Reardon in the final. Davis missed a crucial brown ball in the deciding frame, having made a break of 107 during the match, and Reardon won 10–9.

He reached the semi-finals of the 1978 World Snooker Championship, at the age of 64, having defeated John Virgo 9–8, Dennis Taylor 13–9 and Patsy Fagan 13–10. He met Perrie Mans and trailed 14–16, but missed a pink ball, which allowed Mans to take the frame, and eventually win 18–16. The crucial missed pot was watched by his brother Joe, who was taken ill after the miss; he was rushed to hospital to undergo a six-and-a-half-hour operation, but died a few weeks later. This would be the last time Davis would reach the semi-finals of the event. Davis closed 1978 with a quarter-final appearance in the UK Championship. He defeated veteran Yorkshireman John Dunning 9–2 before losing to Alex Higgins 9–4.

In early 1979 Davis met Alex Higgins in the final of the Castle Open (an event hosted at Bernard Bennett's club in Southampton). During the World Championship that year he beat Kirk Stevens 13–8 to progress to the quarter-finals. This match was to be his last victory at the Crucible Theatre, but Davis compiled the first century of the championship, a break of 109 in the sixth frame — an effort even applauded by the referee. In the quarter-final against Eddie Charlton, Davis soon fell 5–0 behind; he later admitted that he unwisely played an attacking game. This style enabled him to make a break of 110 in the eighth frame to reduce his arrears from 6–1 to 6–2, but he lost the match 13–4.

During the first World Challenge Cup in 1979 Davis acted as England's captain (the team was completed by John Spencer and Graham Miles). He won his first seven frames as England won matches 8–7 over Northern Ireland and the Rest of the World. England were, however, defeated 14–3 in the final by Wales. Although Davis lost 13–5 to David Taylor in his first match in the 1980 World Snooker Championship, he did reach the quarter-finals of the UK Championship the following season, with a 9–6 victory over Mark Wildman before his 9–6 defeat by Alex Higgins. In 1981, at the age of 67, Davis played in his last snooker final, the Raffles/Sheffield Shield Tournament played at the Sheffield Snooker Centre. He beat Mike Watterson 9–6 and Dennis Taylor 9–5. In the final he led Terry Griffiths 4–1, but eventually lost 9–5. Earlier in the season he played in his last Masters, beating Kirk Stevens 5–4 in the first round before losing to Terry Griffiths 5–2 in the quarter-finals.

=== Later years ===
Davis played professionally into old age, making his last appearance in the World Snooker Championship in 1984 aged 70, where he lost to Werbeniuk 10–4. The following year he trailed Canadian Bob Chaperon 7–2 in the fourth qualifying round, but came back to win the match 10–9. Davis showed similar resilience in the 1985 UK Championship qualifying rounds to survive 9–8 against John Rea. He then went on to beat Werbeniuk 9–7 in the first round, having trailed 5–3 at the interval. Davis then lost to Alex Higgins 9–2 in the second round. That same month Davis defeated Billy Kelly and then Kirk Stevens in the Mercantile Credit Classic; Stevens amusingly asked Davis not to retire until Stevens had finally defeated him. Davis would be defeated 5–3 by Eugene Hughes in the fourth round.

In the qualifying rounds of the 1988 World Snooker Championship Davis beat Jack Fitzmaurice 10–8 and Jim Bear 10–4 before losing to Australian John Campbell 10–3 in the final qualifying round. This gave Davis a cheque for £3,117, which despite winning the event eight times, was his highest ever in a professional snooker competition. The following year he beat Bernard Bennett 10–4 in the second round of qualifying for the World Championship, it would be his last victory in a championship he had first graced 52 years earlier.

During the 1989–90 snooker season Davis recorded wins over Jimmy van Rensberg and Mike Watterson, but a 10–6 defeat by Ian Brumby in the second round of qualifying for the World Championship meant that he was forced into a 'play-off' to maintain his full professional status where he was defeated 10–5 by Jason Prince. Suffering from arthritis of the knee, Davis limped from the arena to the press conference during which he was given an emotional standing ovation from spectators, players on other match tables and even those on the practice tables, who all ceased playing to acknowledge the moment. At the press conference, Davis announced he was now retired from competitive snooker but would keep playing in UK-based billiard tournaments. However, snooker threw its doors open to all comers and Davis resumed his snooker career, but played little competitive billiards thereafter.

During the 1990–91 snooker season he recorded his final professional snooker victories at the Mercantile Classic. In the preliminary round he beat veteran Southampton professional Bernard Bennett 5–1 and Tony Wilson 5–4 on the same day. In the next round he lost 5–2 to Rex Williams in a match which saw 99 years of professional experience between the two players. As a former World Champion, Davis was invited to compete in the 1991 World Masters, where he lost to Steve Davis 0–6. This was Fred's last TV appearance in a competitive match. At the age of 79, Davis played in the preliminary rounds of the 1992 Grand Prix, losing 5–1 to the 17-year-old Ronnie O'Sullivan.

== Billiards ==
Davis won the World Billiards Championships in June 1980, beating Rex Williams 5978–4452, and in so doing became the only player except for Joe Davis to have lifted both the World Snooker and World Billiards titles. However, he was quick to point out that standards differed markedly from those of the 1930s when the top players made such large breaks that they killed the game as popular entertainment. He received £1500 plus a cheque for £500 for the highest break (583); this was presented to him by 94-year-old Willie Smith, World Billiards champion in 1920 and 1923. Davis also retained the title later in November the same year, when the championship was restored to a knock-out basis for the first time since 1934. Davis beat Paddy Morgan 1907–978, John Barrie 1253-1153 and Mark Wildman 3037–2064 in the final to pocket £4000, then a record for a billiards event.

The modest billiards revival continued during the 1980s. In March 1982 he was defeated by a record narrow margin of six points in the semi-finals whilst defending his world title, as eventual champion Rex Williams beat him 1500–1494. In the 1983 event he beat Clive Everton and Eddie Charlton en route to the final where he lost to Rex Williams 1500–605, but took the highest break prize for an effort of 427. Also revived (from 1979) was the United Kingdom Professional Billiards Championship. Although Davis lost the title 1548–1031 in the semi-final of the 1979 event (to John Barrie) Davis looked likely to reclaim the title in 1983 when, having dispatched Ian Williamson and Ray Edmonds, he led Mark Wildman 750–477 after the first session of the final. However, Wildman recovered to take the title by 1500–1032.

In the 1984 World Billiards Championship Davis lost to Eddie Charlton 1436–829 in the semi-finals. After this time billiard events increasingly changed structure to a series of games of 400 or 150 points. Davis was less happy with this structure; with this and with his advancing years, he fared less well at the game after this time. In the 1985 World Championship he defeated Clive Everton 3–1 in round one, but fell 3–0 to Australian Robby Foldvari in the quarter-finals. The following year (still seeded third) he lost 3–0 to Bob Close, who was making his professional debut. In 1987 he reached the quarter-finals of both the UK Billiards Championship and the World Championship, but lost on both occasions to Robby Foldvari. Davis's last entry in the World Billiards Championship came in 1992, but with the main competition to be played in India, he did not play his first-round match against David Barton. Davis did enter the 1993 UK Billiards Championship, but did not play his first-round match against Ian Williamson and he also scratched from the Radiant Grand Slam Second Leg where he was due to play David Edwards that same month.

== Retirement and death ==
Davis was made an Officer of the Order of the British Empire in 1977. Davis (accompanied by his wife Sheila) was presented with the award by Queen Elizabeth The Queen Mother at Buckingham Palace. Davis retired in 1993, aged 79, having lost to future world champion Ronnie O'Sullivan 5–1 in the Grand Prix qualifying during his last season. Davis lost 10–1 to Peter Daubney in the first round of qualifying for the 1992 World Snooker Championship. Four months later he lost 5–0 to Mark King in the sixth round of qualifying for the 1993 event; it was Davis' last World Championship match. His last competitive snooker match came in August 1992 when he lost 5–1 to Neil Tomkins in the 1992 European Open.

On 14 August 1993 Davis turned 80 and still held a ranking of 259. He said then that he would have loved to continue playing, but was prevented from doing so by the severe arthritis in his left knee which made it painful to walk. Indeed, it was Davis' attempt to redistribute his stance which contributed to such heavy defeats in his final snooker matches. He died aged 84, on 16 April 1998, in Denbighshire, three days after a fall at his home.

== Controversy ==
At the end of 1988 Davis spoke out against the governing body and its running of the game. His comments followed the convening of disciplinary action against him following his withdrawal from the Mercantile Credit Classic qualifying competition the previous May. Davis withdrew because of intense discomfort caused by his arthritis and confirmed his withdrawal twice with the tournament director, David Harrison. Davis was furious that his unblemished 60-year career had been called into question by a disciplinary board and took up his case via association member Ian Doyle. Doyle offered an apology, but no official apology was given. Davis stated that the WPBSA was more interested in thinking of ways to get at Barry Hearn, rather than acting in a constructive manner and accused the WPBSA of trying to buy off lower-ranked players to "get them on their side against Hearn".

== Performance and rankings timeline ==
=== Pre-war ===
Tournament	1936/ 37	1937/ 38	1938/ 39	1939/ 40
Daily Mail Gold Cup (Note: Round-robin handicap tournament)	A	A	A	3
World Championship	LQ	SF	SF	F

=== Post-war ===
Tournament	1945/ 46	1946/ 47	1947/ 48	1948/ 49	1949/ 50	1950/ 51	1951/ 52	1952/ 53	1953/ 54	1954/ 55	1955/ 56	1956/ 57	1957/ 58	1958/ 59	1959/ 60	1963/ 64	Mar 1965	Apr 1966
Sunday Empire News Tournament	Tournament Not Held			3	Tournament Not Held													
Sporting Record Masters' Tournament	Tournament Not Held				3	Tournament Not Held												
World Professional Match-play Championship	Tournament Not Held						W	W	W	W	W	A	Tournament Not Held					
News of the World Snooker Tournament (Note: Snooker Plus event in the 1959/60 season)	Tournament Not Held				A	5	4	7	3	3	2	2	W	W	2	Not Held		
Conayes Professional Tournament	Tournament Not Held															F	Not Held	
World Championship (Note: Tournaments between 1964 and 1968 were challenge matches)	SF	F	W	W	F	W	A	Tournament Not Held								F	F	F

=== Modern era ===
Tournament	1968/ 69	1969/ 70	1970/ 71	1971/ 72	1972/ 73	1973/ 74	1974/ 75	1975/ 76	1976/ 77	1977/ 78	1978/ 79	1979/ 80	1980/ 81	1981/ 82	1982/ 83	1983/ 84	1984/ 85	1985/ 86	1986/ 87	1987/ 88	1988/ 89	1989/ 90	1990/ 91	1991/ 92	1992/ 93
Ranking	No ranking system								4	9	6	6	8	12	20	28	46	56	47	61	83	89	128	131	190
Ranking tournaments
Dubai Classic (Note: The event was also called the Dubai Masters (1988/1989))	Tournament Not Held																				NR	LQ	A	LQ	LQ
Grand Prix (Note: The event was also called the Professional Players Tournament (1982/93–1983/1984))	Tournament Not Held														1R	1R	LQ	LQ	1R	LQ	LQ	LQ	A	LQ	LQ
UK Championship	Tournament Not Held									Non-Ranking Event							LQ	2R	LQ	1R	LQ	LQ	A	LQ	LQ
Welsh Open	Tournament Not Held																							LQ	LQ
European Open	Tournament Not Held																				LQ	LQ	A	LQ	LQ
British Open (Note: The event was also called the British Gold Cup (1979/1980), Yamaha Organs Trophy (1980/1981) and International Masters (1981/1982–1983/1984))	Tournament Not Held											Non-Ranking Event					LQ	1R	LQ	1R	LQ	LQ	LQ	LQ	LQ
Asian Open (Note: The event was also called the Thailand Masters (1983/1984–1986/1987))	Tournament Not Held															Non-Ranking Event				Not Held		LQ	A	LQ	LQ
International Open (Note: The event was also called the Goya Matchroom Trophy (1985/1986))	Tournament Not Held													NR	LQ	LQ	LQ	LQ	LQ	LQ	LQ	LQ	Not Held		WD
World Championship	Non-Ranking Event					SF	2R	QF	1R	SF	QF	2R	2R	1R	LQ	1R	LQ	LQ	LQ	LQ	LQ	LQ	LQ	LQ	LQ
Non-ranking tournaments
Pot Black	QF	RR	F	LQ	SF	A	SF	RR	RR	A	RR	A	A	A	A	A	A	A	Tournament Not Held					A	A
The Masters	Tournament Not Held						QF	QF	QF	1R	1R	1R	QF	A	A	A	A	A	A	A	A	A	A	A	A
Irish Masters (Note: The event was also called the Benson & Hedges Ireland Tournament (1974/1975–1976/1977))	Tournament Not Held						A	A	A	A	A	SF	A	A	A	A	A	A	A	A	A	A	A	A	A
Pontins Professional	Tournament Not Held					QF	QF	F	RR	RR	RR	QF	A	A	A	A	A	A	A	A	A	A	A	A	A
Former ranking tournaments
Canadian Masters (Note: The event was also called the Canadian Open (1978/1979–1980/1981))	Tournament Not Held						Non-Ranking							Tournament Not Held				Non-Ranking			LQ	Tournament Not Held			
Hong Kong Open (Note: The event was also called the Australian Masters (1979/1980–1987/1988)))	Tournament Not Held											Non-Ranking Event									NH	LQ	Not Held		
Classic	Tournament Not Held											Non-Ranking Event				LQ	LQ	2R	LQ	1R	WD	LQ	LQ	LQ	NH
Strachan Open	Tournament Not Held																							LQ	NH
Former non-ranking tournaments
World Championship	SF	QF	A	QF	QF	Ranking Event																			
Norwich Union Open	Tournament Not Held					A	1R	Tournament Not Held																	
Watney Open	Tournament Not Held						F	Tournament Not Held																	
Holsten Lager International	Tournament Not Held										1R	Tournament Not Held													
Padmore Super Crystalate	Tournament Not Held											QF	Tournament Not Held												
International Open	Tournament Not Held													1R	Ranking Event								Not Held		
British Open	Tournament Not Held											RR	RR	LQ	LQ	A	Ranking Event								
UK Championship	Tournament Not Held									2R	QF	2R	QF	LQ	1R	LQ	Ranking Event								
KitKat Break for World Champions	Tournament Not Held																	QF	Ranking Event						
English Professional Championship	Tournament Not Held												2R	Not Held			LQ	1R	LQ	1R	LQ	Tournament Not Held			
World Seniors Championship	Tournament Not Held																							1R	NH

Performance Table Legend
LQ	lost in the qualifying draw	#R	lost in the early rounds of the tournament (WR = Wildcard round, RR = Round robin)	QF	lost in the quarter-finals
SF	lost in the semi-finals	F	lost in the final	W	won the tournament
DNQ	did not qualify for the tournament	A	did not participate in the tournament	WD	withdrew from the tournament

NH / Not Held	means an event was not held.
NR / Non-Ranking Event	means an event is/was no longer a ranking event.
R / Ranking Event	means an event is/was a ranking event.

== Career titles ==
A list of Davis's professional snooker and billiards championships is shown below.

=== Snooker (12 titles) ===
- World Snooker Championship – 1948, 1949, 1951, 1952*, 1953*, 1954*, 1955*, 1956*
- News of the World Tournament – 1957/58, 1958
- World Open Snooker Championship (Australia) – 1960
- Professional Snooker Association of Canada invitational event – 1970

=== Billiards (4 titles) ===
- World Billiards Championship – May 1980, November 1980
- UK Billiards Championship – 1951
- British Under-16 Boys Championship – 1929
