= Charles Chambers (referee) =

English cue sports referee (1894–1941)

- Charles Chambers (circa 1937)

Personal information
- Born: c. 1897 England
- Died: 21 July 1941 (aged 44) Cheltenham

Sport
- Country: England
- Sport: Snooker
- Professional: 1910–1940

Charles Chambers (c. 1894 – 21 July 1941) was a referee for the cue sports of snooker and English billiards. He worked at Thurston's Hall in London for three decades and was as well known in billiards circles as the leading players. He was the referee during Walter Lindrum's world record billiards break of 4,137 points in 1932. Chambers was the first referee to receive an "A class" certificate from the Billiards Association and Control Council, and refereed the final of the 1937 World Snooker Championship between Joe Davis and Horace Lindrum. His ruling in a 1938 match led to a minimum length cue being specified in the official rules of the game.

Snooker historian Clive Everton wrote that Chambers was "recognised as supreme in his profession".

== Early life and career ==
Chambers was born c. 1897. Willie Smith recalled that Chambers had first refereed in 1910, when Smith played H. W. Stevenson at English billiards. Chambers had been working at Thurston's Hall as a spot boy, but took over refereeing duties in the match when the original referee did not appear for the second day of the match.

Among the matches he refereed were the final of the 1929 World Professional Billiards Championship, and the final of the 1937 World Snooker Championship between Joe Davis and Horace Lindrum. An annual benefit match was played at Thurston's for Chambers, with professionals playing amateurs in a gala that attracted celebrities from the sporting and showbusiness spheres. He was the referee during Walter Lindrum's world record billiards break of 4,137 points in 1932.

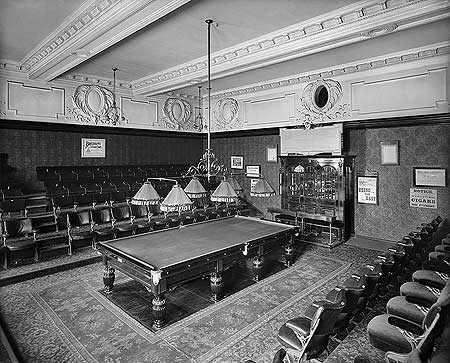
The match room at Thurston's Hall, pictured in 1903

In J. B. Priestley's account of the 1929 Professional Billiards Championship, Chambers was described as "[his] profile was rather like that of the Mad Hatter; his face was all nose, teeth, and glittering eye; and he had an ecclesiastical dignity and gravity of manner. He handed over the rest of the half-butt like one serving at an altar...The voice in which he called out the scores was the most impersonal I have ever heard. It was a voice that belonged to solemn ritual, and it did as much as the four walls and the thickly drawn curtained windows to withdraw us from ordinary life and Leicester Square." (Note: The referee is not named in the original article. Robert Byrne wrote that as the article was reprinted in 1932, the match Priestley described "must be the one staged in 1929 or 1930"; as the original publication was 1929, it must be the 1929 final, which was refereed by Chambers.)

He was the subject of the 1934 BBC National Programme show Sports Talk. The preview in The Radio Times mentioned that he had marked for H. W. Stevenson and Tom Carpenter during a Zeppelin raid and had the text "It's an amazing thing to go into Thurston's and watch big players making their hundreds with infinitely more facility than we make our ' ten ' breaks, and perhaps it is even more fascinating to watch the marker who, unlike even the best players, never seems to make a mistake." When the Billiards Association & Control Council introduced a certification scheme for referees in 1936, Chambers was the first to be awarded a grade "A" certificate, the highest level.

=== Alec Brown fountain-pen cue incident ===
On 14 November 1938 Alec Brown was playing Tom Newman at Thurston's Hall in the 1938/1939 Daily Mail Gold Cup. In the third frame, Brown potted a red, after which the cue ball was left amidst several reds, with only a narrow way through to the black, the only colour not snookered, and which was near its spot. Playing this with conventional equipment would have been awkward. To the surprise of spectators, Brown produced a small fountain pen-sized cue from his vest pocket, chalked it, and played the stroke. Newman protested at this. Chambers, the referee, then inspected the implement, a strip of ebony about five inches long, with one end having a cue tip. Chambers decided to award a foul, and awarded Newman seven points. In response to questions, the referee quoted the rule that said all strokes must be made with the tip of the cue, so he did not regard the "fountain-pen cue" as a valid cue. Eight days later, the Billiards Association and Control Council, which owned the rules, met and decided to introduce a new rule, which has been developed into today's version: "A billiards cue, as recognised by the Billiards and Control Council, shall not be less than three feet in length, and shall show no substantial departure from the traditional and generally accepted shape and form." The official rules of both snooker and billiards now state that "A cue shall be not less than 3 ft (914 mm) in length and shall show no change from the traditional tapered shape and form, with a tip, used to strike the cue-ball, secured to the thinner end."

== Later career and death ==
By 1940, Chambers had worked at Thurston's for three decades, and was as well known in billiards circles as the leading players. After the venue was bombed during World War II, which made staging matches there impossible, Chambers moved to Taunton, where he took part in local British Legion activities, and won the club's handicap snooker tournament.

He died at Cheltenham on 21 July 1941 from heart failure, aged 44. The BA&CC's magazine, The Billiard Player featured a number of posthumous tributes to Chambers. Joe Davis, the first player to hold the professional titles in both billiards and snooker, (Note: This achievement not matched until Joes' brother Fred Davis won the billiards championship in 1980) called Chambers "the most efficient referee in the game", and praised his fairness and integrity. The referee's competence and ability to be unobtrusive were remarked upon by Tom Newman, who felt that these attributes of Chambers were why so many record-making breaks had happened when he was officiating. Other leading players also wrote testimonies, including Smith and Claude Falkiner; six-time World Champion Melbourne Inman called Chambers "the best referee the game ever possessed". Joyce Gardner praised Chambers, who refereed many of the women's championships, as "undoubtedly the world's greatest referee of billiards and snooker". Another women's champion, Ruth Harrison, wrote that he inspired confidence in players. Snooker historian Clive Everton later wrote that Chambers was "recognised as supreme in his profession".
