= 1935/1936 Daily Mail Gold Cup =

The 1935/1936 Daily Mail Gold Cup was a professional billiards tournament sponsored by the Daily Mail. It was the second Daily Mail Gold Cup tournament, an event which ran from 1935 to 1940.

Melbourne Inman won the tournament, his first major title in sixteen years, by winning five of his six matches.

== Format ==
The second event had the same format as the first and was played from 30 December 1935 to 21 March 1936. Most of the matches were played at Thurston's Hall in London, England. There were 7 competitors and a total of 21 matches. The 7 competitors were Joe Davis, Tom Newman, Melbourne Inman, Tom Reece, Claude Falkiner, Horace Lindrum and Sidney Smith. The sessions were reduced to 1 hour and 45 minutes rather than the 2 hours in the previous year's event.

== Results ==
Winner	Score	H'cap	Total	Loser	Score	H'cap	Total	Dates	Venue
Joe Davis	14,023	–	14,023	Claude Falkiner	6,460	6,000	12,460	30 December – 4 January	Thurston's Hall, London
Melbourne Inman	3,825	8,000	11,825	Tom Newman	9,701	–	9,701	30 December – 4 January	Thurston's Hall, London
Joe Davis	13,019	–	13,019	Sidney Smith	7,103	4,000	11,103	6–11 January	Thurston's Hall, London
Tom Reece	5,115	8,500	13,615	Tom Newman	10,402	–	10,402	6–11 January	Newcastle-upon-Tyne
Tom Newman	12,452	–	12,452	Claude Falkiner	5,316	5,250	10,566	13–18 January	Thurston's Hall, London
Sidney Smith	10,599	–	10,599	Melbourne Inman	3,487	5,000	8,487	13–18 January	Leeds
Tom Reece	5,105	5,500	10,605	Sidney Smith	10,347	–	10,347	20–25 January	Thurston's Hall, London
Horace Lindrum	10,092	–	10,092	Claude Falkiner	6,614	1,000	7,614	20–25 January	Leeds
Melbourne Inman	5,406	8,500	13,906	Joe Davis	11,344	–	11,344	27 January – 1 February	Thurston's Hall, London
Sidney Smith	9,126	3,250	12,376	Tom Newman	7,527	–	7,527	27 January – 1 February	Nottingham
Tom Newman	11,373	–	11,373	Horace Lindrum	6,945	4,250	11,195	3–8 February	Thurston's Hall, London
Melbourne Inman	5,502	–	5,502	Tom Reece	4,380	500	4,880	3–8 February	Liverpool
Tom Reece	7,885	4,000	11,885	Claude Falkiner	8,195	–	8,195	10–15 February	Thurston's Hall, London
Sidney Smith	9,497	–	9,497	Horace Lindrum	7,822	500	8,322	17–22 February	Thurston's Hall, London
Tom Newman	10,098	750	10,848	Joe Davis	9,721	–	9,721	24–29 February	Thurston's Hall, London
Horace Lindrum	11,382	–	11,382	Tom Reece	5,352	4,500	9,852	24–29 February	Glasgow
Melbourne Inman	6,051	3,500	9,551	Claude Falkiner	7,559	–	7,559	2–7 March	Thurston's Hall, London
Horace Lindrum	8,442	4,500	12,942	Joe Davis	12,268	–	12,268	2–7 March	Liverpool
Joe Davis	16,026	–	16,026	Tom Reece	5,233	9,000	14,233	9–14 March	Thurston's Hall, London
Sidney Smith	9,808	–	9,808	Claude Falkiner	7,250	1,500	8,750	9–14 March	Liverpool
Melbourne Inman	5,923	4,000	9,923	Horace Lindrum	8,880	–	8,880	16–21 March	Thurston's Hall, London

Table

Pos	Player	Pld	Won
1	(England) Melbourne Inman	6	5
2	(England) Sidney Smith	6	4
3	(England) Joe Davis	6	3
3	(England) Tom Reece	6	3
3	(Australia) Horace Lindrum	6	3
3	(England) Tom Newman	6	3
7	(England) Claude Falkiner	6	0
