= 1940 World Snooker Championship =

Tournament information
- Dates: 22 February – 20 March 1940
- Venue: Thurston's Hall
- City: London
- Country: England
- Organisation: Billiards Association and Control Council
- Highest break: Fred Davis (ENG) (101); Joe Davis (ENG) (101)

Final
- Champion: Joe Davis (ENG)
- Runner-up: Fred Davis (ENG)
- Score: 37–36

The 1940 World Snooker Championship was a professional snooker tournament held at Thurston's Hall in London, England from 22 February to 20 March 1940. It was the fourteenth edition of the World Snooker Championship. Joe Davis defeated his younger brother Fred Davis by 37 frames to 36 in the final, to retain the title that he had held since the tournament's inception in 1927. Joe Davis compiled a century break in the penultimate frame to win the match at 37–35 before a dead frame was played out. The only other century break of the tournament was 101 by Fred Davis earlier in the final.

There were nine participants. Herbert Holt and Conrad Stanbury played a qualifying match, which Holt won to join the other seven players in the competition proper. Holt was eliminated in the first round by Walter Donaldson. This was the last World Championship to be held until the end of World War II, the next edition being held in 1946.

== Background ==
The World Snooker Championship is a professional tournament and the official world championship of the game of snooker. The sport was developed in the late 19th century by British Army soldiers stationed in India. Professional English billiards player and billiard hall manager Joe Davis noticed the increasing popularity of snooker compared to billiards in the 1920s, and with Birmingham-based billiards equipment manager Bill Camkin, persuaded the Billiards Association and Control Council (BACC) to recognise an official professional snooker championship in the 1926–27 season. In 1927, the final of the first professional snooker championship was held at Camkin's Hall; Davis won the tournament by beating Tom Dennis in the final. The annual competition was not titled the World Championship until the 1935 tournament, but the 1927 tournament is now referred to as the first World Snooker Championship. Davis also won the title every year from 1928 to 1939.

There were nine entries for the championship. There were eight places in the competition proper, with a qualifying match scheduled between Herbert Holt and Conrad Stanbury to determine which of them would join the other seven participants in the main draw.

== Summary ==
=== First round (quarter-finals) ===
The first round was held as the best of 31 frames. Holt, who joined the main draw by defeating Stanbury in the qualifying round, met Walter Donaldson in the first match of the competition proper from 22 to 24 February. Donaldson claimed the first four frames and led 6–4 overnight. Donaldson won eight frames on the second day to lead 14–6, two frames from victory, and took the first two frames on the final day to win 16–6. He eventually won 10 of the 11 frames played, for a final score of 24–7. All 11 frames on the final day were completed in 2 hours and 15 minutes. The Glasgow Herald reported that Donaldson "created what must be a world record for fast scoring".

Joe Davis and Alec Brown played in the second quarter-final from 26 to 28 February. Brown had recently won the Daily Mail Gold Cup beating Davis 39–22 in October 1939. However, in that match he received a start of 25 in each frame. Brown took a 2–1 lead but Davis led 7–3 after the first day. Davis extended his lead to 10–3 but at the end of the second day Brown had reduced Davis's lead to 12–8. By winning the last frame of the final afternoon session, Davis achieved a decisive 16–9 lead. The final score was 20–11.

From 29 February to 2 March, Fred Davis faced Sydney Lee in the third quarter-final. On the first day Lee won frame 4 but Davis led 9–1. The players each won five frames on the second day so Davis led 14–6. Davis took the first two frames on the third day to win the match 16–6. The final score was 20–11, with Davis making a break of 88 in the evening session.

The last quarter-final was between Sidney Smith, a tournament finalist in the two preceding years, and Tom Newman, from 4 to 6 March. Newman won the first frame with a break of 53 but Smith led 8–2 overnight and won comfortably 16–3 on the second day. The final score was 22–9.

=== Semi-finals ===
Both Semi-finals were also played as the best of 31 frames, with the first taking place from 7 to 9 March. Joe Davis and Donaldson met in the first semi-final. Davis won the first three frames but Donaldson levelled the match at 5–5 at the end of the first day. Davis won 7 frames on the second day to lead 12–8. On the final day Donaldson won the first frame but Davis won the next four to win the match 16–9. Davis then extended his winning run to 10 frames to leave a final score of 22–9.

From 11 to 13 March, the second semi-final, between Fred Davis and Sidney Smith, was played. Smith established a 7–2 lead, before Davis won the last frame of the day to reduce the gap to four frames. Davis won seven frames on the second day to level the match at 10–10 and then added three of the five frames on the final afternoon to lead 13–12. Winning the first two frames in the concluding evening session gave him a 15–12 lead and, although Smith won the following frame, Davis took the match 16–13. The final score was 17–14.

=== Final ===
Brothers Joe and Fred Davis met in the final from 14 to 20 March (with no play on 17 March, a Sunday). The match was played as the best of 73 frames. Joe took an 8–4 lead on the first day by winning both sessions 4–2. Joe led 14–10 after the second day. Fred won the first 10 frames on the third day and led 21–15 at the end of the day. Including the last frame on the second day, Fred had won 11 frames in succession. Joe won 9 frames on the fourth day to level the match at 24–24. The fifth afternoon session was shared. Fred made a 101 break in frame 50, including 13 reds, 11 blacks, a pink and a blue. It was the first century break of the tournament. Joe won four frames in the evening to lead 31–29. On the final day Joe won the first three frames to lead 34–29 but Fred won the next four frames. When Joe won frame 70, he took a 36–34 lead but Fred won the next. In frame 72 Fred scored the first 12 points but Joe then made a 101 break to take a winning 37–35 lead. Joe got his century by potting the blue, leaving just the pink and black remaining. The spectators cheered for nearly a minute when Joe made his century. Fred won the last dead frame, giving a final score of 37–36. Snooker historian Clive Everton noted that this was the closest that Davis had ever come to defeat in the history of the championship. It was the last time that the pair met in the tournament. Joe Davis retired from the competition after winning for the fifteenth time when the tournament was next held, which was in 1946, after a break due to World War II.

In his book Talking Snooker, Fred Davis recalled the 1940 final "The cynics were not slow to suggest that Joe had 'taken it easy' with his younger brother, but those on the inside knew how wrong they were." The Billiard Player magazine's correspondent wrote that there was no incentive for Joe Davis not to try to win every frame, as "the hall would be packed just the same" even if he had a commanding lead, and attributed the closeness of the result to the younger brother playing the best snooker of his career whilst the defending champion was not consistently at his best. In Joe Davis's autobiography, he claimed that he had always tried his hardest when playing his brother, and commented that 1940 was the "toughest" of all his championship finals.

== Schedule ==
Schedule of matches for the 1940 World Snooker Championship at Thurston's Hall, London
Match	Dates
Walter Donaldson v Herbert Holt	22–24 February 1940
Joe Davis v Alec Brown	26–28 February 1940
Fred Davis v Sydney Lee	29 February–2 March 1940
Sidney Smith v Tom Newman	4–6 March 1940
Joe Davis v Walter Donaldson	7–9 March 1940
Fred Davis v Sidney Smith	11–13 March 1940
Joe Davis v Fred Davis	14–16,18–20 March 1940

== Main draw ==
Match results are shown below. Winning players and scores are denoted in bold text.

**Quarter-finals**; 31 frames		**Semi-finals**; 31 frames		**Final**; 73 frames
**Joe Davis (ENG)**	**20**
Alec Brown (ENG)	11	(England) **Joe Davis**	**22**
**Walter Donaldson (SCO)**	**24**	(Scotland) Walter Donaldson	9
Herbert Holt (ENG)	7			(England) **Joe Davis**	**37**
**Fred Davis (ENG)**	**20**			(England) Fred Davis	36
Sydney Lee (ENG)	11	(England) **Fred Davis**	**17**
**Sidney Smith (ENG)**	**22**	(England) Sidney Smith	14
Tom Newman (ENG)	9

== Final ==
Final: 73 frames. Thurston's Hall, London, 14–16 and 18–20 March 1940.
**Joe Davis**; England	**37**–36	Fred Davis; England
Day 1: **78**–36, **74**–32, **72**–51, 33–**58**, **93**–29, 34–**75**, **84**–23, **62**–50, **68**–24, 37–**76**, 52–**63**, **79**–23; Day 2: **64**–55, 61–**70**, 15–**102**, **97**–55, 56–**69**, 64–**68**, **75**–57, **133**–12, 10–**104**, **70**–63, **87**–25, 46–**80**; Day 3: 63–**67**, 45–**80**, 35–**104** (**56**), 39–**75** (**55**), 31–**90**, 25–**90**, 35–**85** (**84**), 23–**114** (**76**), 41–**62**, 9–**100**, **79**–21, 41–**90**; Day 4: **106**–15 (**88**), **80**–30, **82**–34, 40–**79** (**78**), **85**–19, 41–**66**, **109**–2, **70**–31, **78**–36, 22–**91**, **92**–7, **81**–39; Day 5: **102**–24 (**61**), 41–**101** (**101**), **85**–25, 27–**84**, 8–**117** (**68**), **76**–49, **85**–25, 20–**78**, **74**–71, **91**–43, 24–**111**, **84**–14; Day 6: **62**–59, **68**–66 (Fred Davis 55), **89**–26, 31–**98** (**72**), 55–**73**, 38–**76**, 19–**89**, **68**–57, 36–**90**, **76**–38, 12–**86**, **101**–12 (**101**), 24–**83**
Joe Davis won the match at 37–35. A further dead frame was played.

== Qualifying Tournament ==
Herbert Holt and Conrad Stanbury met at Thurston's Hall for their qualifying match, played from 19 to 21 February. Holt led 6–4 after the first day and 13–7 after day two. Although he lost the first frame on the final day, he took the next three to secure a winning 16–8 lead. Stanbury won five of the seven dead frames for a final score of 18–13.

31 frames
**Herbert Holt (ENG)**	**18**
Conrad Stanbury (CAN)	13

== Century breaks ==
There were two century breaks during the tournament, both during the final.

- 101 Fred Davis
- 101 Joe Davis
