= Daily Mail Gold Cup =

Tournament information
- Venue: mostly at Thurston's Hall
- Location: London
- Country: England
- Established: 1935
- Organisation(s): BACC
- Format: Round-robin handicap
- Final year: 1939/40
- Final champion: (England) Alec Brown

The Daily Mail Gold Cup was an important professional cue sports tournament from 1935 to 1940. In the first two tournaments it was contested as a billiards event before becoming a snooker event. It was sponsored by the Daily Mail. The tournament was suspended following the 1939/40 event and not played again. The concept of a handicap snooker tournament was revived for the 1948 Sunday Empire News Tournament.

The tournament was always played as a round-robin handicap event. Most matches were played at Thurston's Hall in London, England, although, in most seasons, a few matches were played in other major cities. Matches lasted a week (Monday to Saturday) and generally followed each other, week after week, so that the tournament ran for an extended period of about 3 months.

== Billiards ==
The first two tournaments were billiards events. In the first tournament in early 1935 there were 5 competitors: Joe Davis, Tom Newman, Willie Smith, Melbourne Inman and Tom Reece. The event was a "sealed handicap" in which the handicap for each match was determined before the event started but was not disclosed to the players until after the tournament finished. Tom Newman won the Gold Cup, winning all his four matches, ahead of Willie Smith who had three wins.

The second event had the same format as the first and was played in early 1936. There were 7 competitors. Willie Smith did not play but there were three new players: Claude Falkiner, Horace Lindrum and Sidney Smith. With 5 wins, Melbourne Inman won the tournament, winning five of his six matches, ahead of Sidney Smith who had four wins.

== Snooker ==
The third event was a snooker tournament and was played in late 1936. There were 6 competitors: Joe Davis, Horace Lindrum, Sidney Smith, Willie Smith, Tom Newman and Melbourne Inman. Each match was over 71 frames. The event had two handicapping aspects. Each player had a handicap which was given in each frame. The handicaps were: Joe Davis – 0, Horace Lindrum – 7, Sidney Smith – 14, Willie Smith – 18, Tom Newman – 24, Melbourne Inman – 35. In addition, there was a sealed handicap for each match. This was an additional adjustment to be made after each match (a number of frames) which was kept secret until the end of the tournament. It seems that the handicapper decided to make no adjustments since the final table simply reflects the actual results. Despite giving a handicap to all the other players, the cup was won by Joe Davis who won all his five matches. The Australian Horace Lindrum finished in second place in the final table.

During the 1936 tournament Sidney Smith scored a record 133 break, becoming the first player to make a total clearance in snooker competition. It happened in frame 58 of his match against Tom Newman on 11 December. Smith's total clearance included the 15 reds with six blacks, six pinks, two blues, a green and then all the colours.

The 1937/1938 event was played from September 1937 to January 1938. There were 7 competitors; the 6 who had played in the 1936 event with the addition of Alec Brown. The handicaps were: Joe Davis – 0, Horace Lindrum – 10, Sidney Smith – 17, Willie Smith – 21, Alec Brown – 24, Tom Newman – 27, Melbourne Inman – 45. The "sealed" aspect of the 1936 event was abandoned. Despite the slightly higher handicaps, Joe Davis won the cup for the second successive year. Willie Smith finishing in second place in the final table, having beaten Joe Davis 36–35.

The 1938/1939 event was played from October 1938 to January 1939. There were 6 competitors, the same as in the 1937/38 event without Melbourne Inman. The handicap system was revised, each match having a separate handicap. Joe Davis gave Horace Lindrum 20 points, Sidney Smith 30, Willie Smith 25, Alec Brown 35 and Tom Newman 40. The cup was won by Alec Brown with Sidney Smith finishing in second place in the final table. Both players had won 4 of their 5 matches but Brown had won more frames, 200 to Smith's 190.

During the 1938/1939 tournament Joe Davis scored a new official record break of 138, beating the previous record of 137. It happened in frame 53 of his match against Alec Brown on 9 December. Brown made only two visits to the table before Davis made the total clearance which included the 15 reds with 11 blacks, a pink, two blues, a green and then all the colours.

The 1939/1940 event was played from October 1939 to February 1940. There were 7 competitors and a total of 21 matches. Each match lasted six days and was the best of 61 frames, a reduction from the 71 frames played in previous years. There were 7 competitors which included three new to the event: Fred Davis, Walter Donaldson and Sydney Lee. Joe Davis gave Sidney Smith 20 points, Alec Brown 25, Walter Donaldson 25, Fred Davis 30, Tom Newman 40 and Sydney Lee 45. The cup was won for the second time by Alec Brown who won 5 of his 6 matches. Sydney Lee finished in second place ahead of Fred Davis. Both players had won 4 of their 6 matches but Lee had won more frames, 206 to Davis's 188.

== Winners ==
Year	Winner	Record	Runner-up	Season
Billiards
1935	(England) Tom Newman	4–0	(England) Willie Smith	1934/35
1935/36	(England) Melbourne Inman	5–1	(England) Sidney Smith	1935/36
Snooker
1936	(England) Joe Davis	5–0	(Australia) Horace Lindrum	1936/37
1937/38	(England) Joe Davis	5–1	(England) Willie Smith	1937/38
1938/39	(England) Alec Brown	4–1	(England) Sidney Smith	1938/39
1939/40	(England) Alec Brown	5–1	(England) Sydney Lee	1939/40

== Competitors ==
The following 12 players competed in at least one of the tournaments:

- (England) Alec Brown 1937/38, 1938/39, 1939/40
- (England) Fred Davis 1939/40
- (England) Joe Davis 1935, 1935/36, 1936, 1937/38, 1938/39, 1939/40
- (Scotland) Walter Donaldson 1939/40
- (England) Claude Falkiner 1935/36
- (England) Melbourne Inman 1935, 1935/36, 1936, 1937/38
- (England) Sydney Lee 1939/40
- (Australia) Horace Lindrum 1935/36, 1936, 1937/38, 1938/39
- (England) Tom Newman 1935, 1935/36, 1936, 1937/38, 1938/39, 1939/40
- (England) Tom Reece 1935, 1935/36
- (England) Sidney Smith, 1935/36, 1936, 1937/38, 1938/39, 1939/40
- (England) Willie Smith 1935, 1936, 1937/38, 1938/39
