= Horace Lindrum =

Australian snooker and billiards player (1912–1974)

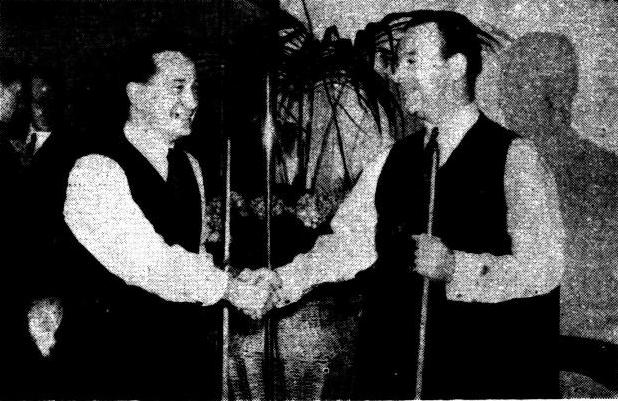
- Joe Davis and Lindrum shaking hands before the 1946 World Championship final

Personal information
- Born: 15 January 1912 Sydney, Australia
- Died: 20 June 1974 (aged 62) Dee Why, Sydney, Australia

Sport
- Country: Australia
- Sport: Snooker

Tournament wins
- World Championship: 1952

Horace Lindrum (born Horace Norman William Morrell, 15 January 1912 – 20 June 1974) was an Australian professional player of snooker and English billiards. Lindrum won the 1952 World Snooker Championship defeating New Zealander Clark McConachy. The tournament is disputed, as it had only two participants, and other players boycotted the event to play in the 1952 World Professional Match-play Championship. Lindrum won the Australian Professional Billiards Championship on multiple occasions, first winning the event in 1934.

Lindrum lived in Britain for long periods and played in the major British tournaments. From his arrival in Britain in 1935, he was regarded as the second-best player in the world, behind Joe Davis. Lindrum contested three World Snooker Championship finals against Davis, in 1936, 1937 and 1946, losing all three to Davis but coming close to beating him on several occasions.

== Career ==
=== Early years ===
Lindrum was born Horace Norman William Morrell on 15 January 1912 in Sydney. He was the son of Clara, who was an Australian women's snooker champion in her own right. Her brother was Walter Lindrum.

Lindrum made his first century break in snooker at the age of 16 and his first four-figure break in billiards at the age of 18. He challenged Frank Smith for the Australian Professional Snooker Championship and, on 5 December 1931, at the age of 19, won by an aggregate score of 8899–8262. Lindrum accepted a challenge from Smith for a rematch and won convincingly, 8060–5942. Three years later, on 24 November 1934, he also won the Australian Professional Billiards Championship, successfully challenging his uncle Fred who had held the title since 1908. Lindrum won by 18,754–9,143.

=== Unofficial World Championship 1934 ===
In June 1934, four-time World Billiards Championship winner Joe Davis travelled to Australia to play at the 1934 championship. Davis played Walter Lindrum, the defending champion, in Melbourne, from 14 to 27 October. Walter Lindrum won a close match 23,553–22,678. Davis was scheduled to depart Australia on 30 October but accepted an invitation to play against Horace Lindrum at snooker, delaying his departure until 7 November. An 81-frame match was scheduled at the Tivoli Billiard Theatre, Bourke Street, in Melbourne from 29 October to 6 November with two sessions of five frames played each day. Davis insisted on using the same table from the World Billiards Championship final. The match was described as the unofficial World Championship final.

Lindrum won the first two frames of the match, but Davis led 6–4 at the end of the first day. Davis made a break of 56 in the fifth frame. Davis extended his lead to 12–8 on the second day and then won eight frames on the third day to lead 20–10. Davis made breaks of 56 and 54 on the third day. Davis extended his lead to 27–13 on the fourth day but Lindrum won six frames on the fifth day to leave Davis 31–19 ahead. On Saturday, the sixth day, Davis won 8 frames to lead 39–21, including a 50 break. Davis won two frames on Monday afternoon to take a 1–2 lead. With the result decided, the match became more open, as Lindrum had breaks of 54 and 80, the highest of the match. The final Tuesday afternoon session was abandoned, because it clashed with the Melbourne Cup. After a final evening session of five frames, Davis finished 46–29 ahead. Fred Lindrum criticised Davis for demanding a £100 side bet and for insisting on the use of the match table on which he had recently played.

=== Trips to England 1935–1947 ===
Lindrum arrived in England in October 1935 and stayed until his return to Australia at the end of March 1939, only returning to Australia for a brief period in the middle of 1937. After his arrival, Lindrum played a week-long billiards match against Tom Newman at Thurston's Hall. Given a handicap of 2,000, he won 8,348 to 7,883. Lindrum then played Joe Davis in a billiards match, which had two frames of snooker played at the end of each session. Davis gave a 3,000 start but still won 10,348 to 9,847, although Lindrum won the snooker, 14–10. In December, Lindrum played two snooker-only best-of-61 matches against Joe Davis over successive weeks at Thurston's Hall. Lindrum won the first match, 31–30, while Davis won the second, 32–29. Davis won the side stakes for the overall aggregate score and for the highest break of 104, scored on the final evening, the only century break in the two matches.

The early part of 1936 was taken up with the 1935/1936 Daily Mail Gold Cup. This was a handicap billiards event, with Lindrum handicapped in the middle of the 7 competitors, receiving points from 3 and giving them to the other 3. Lindrum won three of his six matches. The Gold Cup was immediately followed by the World Snooker Championship. Lindrum met Bert Terry in the first round, Clare O'Donnell in the quarter-final, and Stanley Newman in the semi-final, winning all his matches comfortably. In the final, Lindrum met defending champion Joe Davis. Lindrum led 6–4 and 11–9, before Davis won four out of the next five frames with top breaks of 75 and 78 to lead 13–12. However, Lindrum levelled the match at 15–15, before winning six out of ten frames to lead 21–19, and led at the conclusion of the penultimate day 26–24. He then won the first frame of the final day, to lead 27–24, before Davis won the last ten frames in a row to win 34–27, having already won the match 31–27.

The 1936 Daily Mail Gold Cup was played as a snooker competition, reflecting snooker's growing importance. It was a handicap event, with Joe Davis handicapped as the best player. Lindrum received a 7-point start in each frame from Davis but had to give starts ranging from 7 to 28 to the other four competitors. Lindrum was second in the event behind Davis, winning three of five matches. His defeats were by 35–36 to Sidney Smith, giving Smith a 7-point start, and by 30–41 in the final match of the tournament to Davis. The main part of the 1937 World Snooker Championship did not start until late February, and the early part of 1937 was mostly taken up with snooker exhibition matches between Lindrum and Davis, with Lindrum always receiving a 7-point start in each frame. There were four matches played over a total of 30 days, and, with 12 frames per frame being played, they played some 360 frames against each other in the period. Lindrum won the first match in Manchester, 39–36, a match that included a break of 141 by Lindrum. The following week, in Coventry, Davis won 39–32. Lindrum then won 74–69 in a two-week match at Thurston's Hall.

Lindrum returned to London to compete in the 1937 World Snooker Championship. He won his quarterfinal against Sydney Lee and his semi-final against Willie Smith comfortably, and met Joe Davis again in the final. The first day was level at 5–5 but Lindrum led 11–9 and extended this to 17–13 at the half-way stage. The fourth day started with a break of 103 by Davis in frame 31. Davis fouled on his first visit to the table, and, after a break of 29 by Lindrum, Davis cleared the table on his second visit. Davis reduced the deficit to 21–19 on the fourth day and then won eight frames on the fifth day to lead 27–23. After the final afternoon session, Davis still led 29–26, with Lindrum needing to win five of the six evening frames. Lindrum won the first two, but Davis won the next two to win the match 31–28. The last two frames were shared to give a final result of 32–29. His match against Smith was spotlighted by the BBC in a 10-minute segment before they broadcast snooker.

Lindrum returned to Australia in the middle of 1937, playing a series of exhibition matches with Melbourne Inman. He returned to England in time to play in the Daily Mail Gold Cup. He was again ranked as the second-best player, receiving 10 points per frame from Joe Davis and conceding points to the other competitors. Lindrum lost his first two matches, won the next three, and lost to Davis 37–34 in the final match. He finished third in the final table. Lindrum did not enter the 1938 World Snooker Championship because he objected to certain conditions, particularly the cloth used. However, he played a two-week exhibition match against Davis, the new champion, at Thurston's Hall immediately after the championship. Lindrum received 10 points in each frame, but Davis won 71–62. He ended the season by beating Fred Davis 39–34, despite conceding 14 points per frame.

Lindrum started the 1938/39 season playing a couple of exhibition matches against Joe Davis, Davis conceding 10 points per frame. Davis won both matches, 39–32 in Edinburgh and 37–34 in Newcastle upon Tyne. In the Daily Mail Gold Cup, Lindrum was again handicapped as the second strongest player but now received 20 points per frame from Joe Davis. The tournament was a disappointment for Lindrum, who lost his first four matches before beating Davis 36–35 in the final match. Lindrum played in the 1939 World Snooker Championship, but he lost his first match 14–17 to Alec Brown. Lindrum ended his disappointing season by playing Joe Davis in an exhibition match. Davis conceded 21 points per frame but still won 39–34. Lindrum returned to Australia, arriving in late August. During this time, Lindrum made an unofficial maximum break in New South Wales, the first to be made in competitive play. Lindrum planned to return to England later in the year, but because of World War II he did not return until August 1945. At the 1946 World Snooker Championship Lindrum won his quarterfinal match against Herbert Holt and beat Fred Davis in the semi-final to meet Joe Davis in the final for the third time.

Lindrum played in the World Championship in 1947 and 1951 where he lost to Walter Donaldson in the semi-final on both occasions. During a trip to India in 1952, Lindrum made the first century break in the country.

=== 1952 World Professional Snooker Championship ===
The 1952 World Snooker Championship had only two entries, Lindrum and Clark McConachy, following a dispute between the Professional Billiards Players' Association (PBPA) and the Billiards Association and Control Council (BACC). The BACC thought the championship was primarily about honour, and insisted that financial consideration should come second. With Fred Davis and Walter Donaldson sharing only £500 for the previous year's final, the PBPA boycotted and established an alternative world championship called the 1952 World Professional Match-play Championship. Lindrum was the only active professional to take part in the BACC event.

Lindrum won the 145-frame match comfortably, taking a 73–37 lead early on the 10th day. The remaining 35 "dead" frames were due to be played, although in the end only a total of 143 frames were played, with Lindrum winning 94–49. Snooker journalist Clive Everton has called the match "farcical", pointing out that most of the snooker public regarded the World Match-Play Championship as the real world championship.

Lindrum was the only Australian to win the championship until Neil Robertson at the 2010 event.

=== Later years and death ===
By 1957, Lindrum retired from competitive play to become an exhibition player, touring Australia and South Africa and describing himself as the "undefeated world champion." In 1963, the Australian Professional Billiards and Snooker Association asked him to return to competitive play to combat the flagging interest in the sport in Australia. The president of the Australian Association, Dennis Robinson, described Lindrum's return to competitive play as a 'magnanimous gesture', and the program published for the event contained 'a tribute to Lindrum'. That year, Lindrum won the Australian Open.

Lindrum died on 20 June 1974 at the Delmar Private Hospital, Dee Why, Sydney, of a bronchial carcinoma.

== Performance timeline ==
Tournament	1935/ 36	1936/ 37	1937/ 38	1938/ 39	1939/ 40	1945/ 46	1946/ 47	1947/ 48	1948/ 49	1949/ 50	1950/ 51	1951/ 52
Daily Mail Gold Cup (Note: Round-robin handicap tournament) (Note: Billiards event before 1936/37 season)	NH	2	3	6	A	Tournament Not Held						
Sunday Empire News Tournament	Tournament Not Held								A	Tournament Not Held		
News of the World Snooker Tournament	Tournament Not Held									4	7	A
Sporting Record Masters' Tournament	Tournament Not Held									WD	Not Held	
World Championship	F	F	A	QF	A	F	SF	A	A	A	SF	W
World Professional Match-play Championship	Tournament Not Held											A

Performance Table Legend
LQ	lost in the qualifying draw	#R/N	lost in the early rounds of the tournament (N = position in round-robin event)	QF	lost in the quarter-finals
SF	lost in the semi-finals	F	lost in the final	W	won the tournament
DNQ	did not qualify for the tournament	A	did not participate in the tournament	WD	withdrew from the tournament

NH / Not Held	means an event was not held.
