= 1954/1955 News of the World Snooker Tournament =

News of the World Tournament
Tournament information
- Dates: 6 September 1954 – 15 January 1955
- Venue: Leicester Square Hall
- City: London
- Country: United Kingdom
- Format: Non-Ranking event
- Total prize fund: £1500
- Winner's share: £500
- Highest break: (England) Joe Davis (146)

Final
- Champion: (Northern Ireland) Jackie Rea
- Runner-up: (England) Joe Davis

The 1954/1955 News of the World Snooker Tournament was a professional snooker tournament sponsored by the News of the World. The tournament was won by Jackie Rea who won all of his 8 matches. He finished ahead of Joe Davis who won 6 matches. The News of the World Snooker Tournament ran from 1949/50 to 1959 but this was the last to be held at Leicester Square Hall, which closed soon after the end of the tournament.

== Format ==
The 1954/55 event was a round-robin snooker tournament and was played from 6 September 1954 to 15 January 1955. All matches were played at Leicester Square Hall in London. There were 9 competitors and a total of 36 matches. The competitors were Joe Davis, Fred Davis, Walter Donaldson, John Barrie, Albert Brown, Alec Brown, John Pulman, Jackie Rea and qualifier Kingsley Kennerley. Each match lasted three days and was the best of 37 frames.

Each match was separately handicapped. Joe Davis played level with Fred Davis and gave Walter Donaldson and John Pulman 14, Albert Brown 18, Alec Brown 23, John Barrie 24, Jackie Rea and Kingsley Kennerley 25. Fred Davis gave John Pulman 10, Walter Donaldson 12, Albert Brown and John Barrie 14, Alec Brown 16, Jackie Rea 18 and Kingsley Kennerley 21. Walter Donaldson played level with John Pulman and gave Albert Brown and John Barrie 12, Alec Brown 14, Jackie Rea 16 and Kingsley Kennerley 18. John Pulman gave Albert Brown 5, Alec Brown 10, John Barrie 14, Jackie Rea 16 and Kingsley Kennerley 18. Albert Brown played level with Alec Brown and John Barrie and gave Kingsley Kennerley 12 and Jackie Rea 14. John Barrie played level with Alec Brown 0 and Jackie Rea and Kingsley Kennerley 7. Alec Brown gave Jackie Rea 5 and Kingsley Kennerley 12. Jackie Rea gave Kingsley Kennerley 7.

== Results ==
Joe Davis made a break of 146 on 7 December, the second day of his match against Albert Brown. He potted a pink after his fourth red. The break equalled Davis's own record break, set on 1 March 1950.

Jackie Rea won all his 8 matches, clinching victory after his 19–18 win against John Barrie on 15 December.

The match between Joe Davis and his brother, Fred was the last competitive match played at Leicester Square Hall before it closed. Joe won the match 19–18 and made a 137 clearance on the final day. The following Saturday, Joe Davis compiled the first officially recognised maximum break in a match against 68-year-old fellow Englishman Willie Smith. The match between Davis and Smith was played as part of a series of events marking the closure of the hall.

Winner	Score	Loser	Date
Jackie Rea	22–15	Kingsley Kennerley	6–8 September
Kingsley Kennerley	21–16	Albert Brown	9–11 September
Albert Brown	25–12	John Barrie	13–15 September
Walter Donaldson	21–16	John Barrie	16–18 September
Jackie Rea	22–15	Alec Brown	20–22 September
Jackie Rea	23–14	John Pulman	23–25 September
Fred Davis	20–17	Alec Brown	27–29 September
Fred Davis	19–18	Walter Donaldson	30 September–2 October
Joe Davis	22–15	Walter Donaldson	4–6 October
Joe Davis	24–13	John Pulman	7–9 October
Jackie Rea	26–11	Albert Brown	11–13 October
Fred Davis	19–18	Albert Brown	14–16 October
Jackie Rea	21–16	Joe Davis	18–20 October
Kingsley Kennerley	19–18	John Barrie	21–23 October
Kingsley Kennerley	22–15	John Pulman	25–27 October
Fred Davis	19–18	John Pulman	28–30 October
Joe Davis	19–18	Alec Brown	1–3 November
Alec Brown	21–16	John Barrie	4–6 November
Jackie Rea	21–16	Walter Donaldson	8–10 November
Walter Donaldson	23–14	Kingsley Kennerley	11–13 November
John Pulman	20–17	Albert Brown	15–17 November
John Barrie	25–12	Joe Davis	18–20 November
Fred Davis	22–15	John Barrie	22–24 November
Jackie Rea	20–17	Fred Davis	25–27 November
John Pulman	21–16	Alec Brown	29 November–1 December
Joe Davis	28–9	Kingsley Kennerley	2–4 December
Joe Davis	23–14	Albert Brown	6–8 December
Alec Brown	20–17	Walter Donaldson	9–11 December
Jackie Rea	19–18	John Barrie	13–15 December
Kingsley Kennerley	19–18	Alec Brown	16–18 December
John Pulman	20–17	John Barrie	27–29 December
Albert Brown	22–15	Walter Donaldson	30 December–1 January
Kingsley Kennerley	19–18	Fred Davis	3–5 January
Albert Brown	?–?	Alec Brown	6–8 January
Walter Donaldson	20–17	John Pulman	10–12 January
Joe Davis	19–18	Fred Davis	13–15 January

Table the final standings are shown below.

Pos	Player	Pld	MW	FW	FL	Prize
1	(Northern Ireland) Jackie Rea	8	8	174	122	£500
2	(England) Joe Davis	8	6	163	133	£300
3	(England) Fred Davis	8	5	152	144	£200
4	(England) Kingsley Kennerley	8	5	138	158	£150
5	(Scotland) Walter Donaldson	8	3	145	151	£100
6	(England) Albert Brown	8	3	142	154	£75
7	(England) John Pulman	8	3	138	158	£75
8	(England) Alec Brown	8	2	143	153	£50
9	(England) John Barrie	8	1	137	159	£30

The positions were determined firstly by the number of matches won (MW) and, in the event of a tie, the number of frames won (FW). Albert Brown led Alec Brown 15–9 after the second day of their match, after which Alec Brown withdrew due to illness.

== Qualifying ==
The qualifying tournament was held from 6 to 15 May 1954. These matches were also played at Leicester Square Hall in London. There were 3 competitors: Kingsley Kennerley, Sydney Lee and Harry Stokes. Like the main event, each match lasted three days and was the best of 37 frames. Kennerley won both his matches to qualify. Stokes beat Lee in the other match.

== Broadcasting ==
The BBC showed three short, 30 minute, TV programmes during the matches between Joe Davis and John Pulman on 8 October, between John Pulman and John Barrie on 28 December, and between Walter Donaldson and John Pulman on 12 January. The commentator on each occasion was Sidney Smith.
