= 1950/1951 News of the World Snooker Tournament =

News of the World Tournament
Tournament information
- Dates: 9 October 1950 – 20 January 1951
- Venue: Leicester Square Hall
- City: London
- Country: United Kingdom
- Format: Non-Ranking event
- Total prize fund: £1500
- Winner's share: £500
- Highest break: (England) Joe Davis (143)

Final
- Champion: (England) Alec Brown
- Runner-up: (England) John Pulman

The 1950/1951 News of the World Snooker Tournament was a professional snooker tournament sponsored by the News of the World. The tournament was won by Alec Brown who won all his 7 matches, finishing ahead of John Pulman who won 5 matches. The News of the World Snooker Tournament ran from 1949/50 to 1959.

== Format ==
The 1950/51 event was a round-robin snooker tournament and was played from 9 October 1950 to 20 January 1951. All matches were played at Leicester Square Hall in London. There were 8 competitors and a total of 28 matches. There were 8 competitors: Joe Davis, Fred Davis, Walter Donaldson, Albert Brown, Horace Lindrum, John Pulman and Sidney Smith together with Alec Brown who had won the qualifying event. Each match lasted three days and was the best of 37 frames.

Unlike the previous year's tournament, each match was separately handicapped. Joe Davis played level with Walter Donaldson and gave Fred Davis 10, Albert Brown, Horace Lindrum and Sidney Smith, John Pulman 25 and Alec Brown 30. Fred Davis played level with Walter Donaldson and Horace Lindrum and gave Albert Brown 10, Sidney Smith 14, John Pulman 16 and Alec Brown 21. Walter Donaldson gave Albert Brown, Horace Lindrum and Sidney Smith 10, John Pulman 16 and Alec Brown 21. Albert Brown played level with John Pulman and gave Sidney Smith 3, Horace Lindrum 7 and Alec Brown 10. Horace Lindrum played level with Sidney Smith and gave John Pulman 7 and Alec Brown 11. Sidney Smith gave John Pulman 7 and Alec Brown 11. John Pulman gave Alec Brown 11.

== Results ==
In his last match John Pulman, receiving 25 points each frame, beat Joe Davis to move into second place in the table. Joe Davis still had one match to play and could retake second place by winning 22 frames against his brother Fred in his last match. Even though he had a break of 140 on the second day, Joe trailed 14–10 and could no longer get second place. Fred eventually won 22–15.

Joe Davis made a break of 143 in the third frame of his match against Walter Donaldson. He potted all the red, 12 blacks, 2 pinks and a blue and then all the colours. He made a break of 101 the following day.

Winner	Score	Loser	Date
Fred Davis	21–16	Walter Donaldson	9–11 October
Alec Brown	20–17	Fred Davis	12–14 October
Alec Brown	23–14	Joe Davis	16–18 October
Joe Davis	20–17	Albert Brown	19–21 October
Albert Brown	22–15	Sidney Smith	23–25 October
Sidney Smith	23–14	Horace Lindrum	26–28 October
Joe Davis	20–17	Walter Donaldson	30 October–1 November
John Pulman	26–11	Walter Donaldson	2–4 November
John Pulman	20–17	Fred Davis	6–8 November
Alec Brown	23–14	Albert Brown	9–11 November
Alec Brown	20–17	Walter Donaldson	13–15 November
Joe Davis	22–15	Sidney Smith	16–18 November
Albert Brown	20–17	John Pulman	20–22 November
Alec Brown	21–16	John Pulman	23–25 November
Horace Lindrum	21–16	Fred Davis	27–29 November
Joe Davis	24–13	Horace Lindrum	30 November–2 December
Alec Brown	23–14	Sidney Smith	4–6 December
Albert Brown	21–16	Walter Donaldson	7–9 December
Walter Donaldson	19–18	Horace Lindrum	11–13 December
Fred Davis	21–16	Albert Brown	14–16 December
Sidney Smith	21–16	Fred Davis	18–20 December
John Pulman	20–17	Sidney Smith	21–23 December
Albert Brown	21–16	Horace Lindrum	1–3 January
John Pulman	19–18	Horace Lindrum	4–6 January
John Pulman	20–17	Joe Davis	8–10 January
Alec Brown	24–13	Horace Lindrum	11–13 January
Sidney Smith	20–17	Walter Donaldson	15–17 January
Fred Davis	22–15	Joe Davis	18–20 January

Table

Pos	Player	Pld	MW	FW	Prize
1	(England) Alec Brown	7	7	154	£500
2	(England) John Pulman	7	5	138	?
3	(England) Joe Davis	7	4	132	?
4	(England) Albert Brown	7	4	131	?
5	(England) Fred Davis	7	3	130	?
6	(England) Sidney Smith	7	3	125	?
7=	(Australia) Horace Lindrum	7	1	113	?
7=	(Scotland) Walter Donaldson	7	1	113	?

The positions were determined firstly by the number of matches won (MW) and, in the event of a tie, the number of frames won (FW).

== Qualifying ==
The qualifying tournament was played from 18 September to 7 October 1950. These matches were also played at Leicester Square Hall in London. As in the main event, each match lasted three days and was the best of 37 frames. There were 4 competitors: John Barrie, Alec Brown, Kingsley Kennerley and Sydney Lee. John Barrie and Alec Brown each won their first two matches which meant that the final match, between the two, would decide the winner. Alec Brown won a close match 19–18. Kingsley Kennerley had beaten Sydney Lee 21–16 in their final match.
