= 1937/1938 Daily Mail Gold Cup =

Daily Mail Gold Cup
Tournament information
- Dates: 27 September 1937 – 29 January 1938
- Final venue: Thurston's Hall
- Final city: London
- Country: England
- Format: Non-Ranking event

Final
- Champion: (England) Joe Davis
- Runner-up: (England) Willie Smith

The 1937/1938 Daily Mail Gold Cup was a professional snooker tournament sponsored by the Daily Mail. The cup was won for the second successive year by Joe Davis with Willie Smith finishing in second place in the final table. It was the fourth Daily Mail Gold Cup tournament, although only the second as a snooker event. The Daily Mail Gold Cup ran from 1935 to 1940.

== Format ==
As in 1936, the 1937/1938 event was a round-robin snooker tournament and was played from 27 September 1937 to 29 January 1938. Most of the matches were played at Thurston's Hall in London. There were 7 competitors and a total of 21 matches. As in 1936, each match was of 71 frames and lasted six days. The 7 competitors were the same in the 1936 event with the addition of Alec Brown. Each player had a handicap which was given in each frame. The handicaps were: Joe Davis - 0, Horace Lindrum - 10, Sidney Smith - 17, Willie Smith - 21, Alec Brown - 24, Tom Newman - 27, Melbourne Inman - 45. The "sealed" aspect of the 1936 event was abandoned.

== Results ==
The cup was won for the second successive year by Joe Davis who won all his five of his six matches. Davis had been handicapped slightly harsher than in 1936 but only lost one match, and that by a single frame to Willie Smith. Giving Willie Smith a 21-point lead in each frame, Davis had taken a 35–34 lead but lost the last two frames. As in the previous event Melbourne Inman finished last, despite receiving the most generous handicap. The other five players were very close in the final table.

Winner	Score	Loser	Dates	Venue
Tom Newman	36–35	Alec Brown	27 September–2 October	Thurston's Hall, London
Sidney Smith	36–35	Willie Smith	4–9 October	Thurston's Hall, London
Joe Davis	39–32	Tom Newman	11–16 October	Thurston's Hall, London
Willie Smith	37–34	Horace Lindrum	18–23 October	Thurston's Hall, London
Joe Davis	43–28	Melbourne Inman	25–30 October	Thurston's Hall, London
Sidney Smith	36–35	Horace Lindrum	1–6 November	Thurston's Hall, London
Tom Newman	43–28	Melbourne Inman	8–13 November	Thurston's Hall, London
Alec Brown	36–35	Willie Smith	8–13 November	Leeds
Joe Davis	42–29	Alec Brown	15–20 November	Thurston's Hall, London
Horace Lindrum	43–28	Melbourne Inman	15–20 November	Liverpool
Willie Smith	38–33	Melbourne Inman	22–27 November	Thurston's Hall, London
Tom Newman	36–35	Sidney Smith	22–27 November	Leicester
Alec Brown	40–31	Sidney Smith	29 November–4 December	Thurston's Hall, London
Willie Smith	36–35	Joe Davis	6–11 December	Thurston's Hall, London
Horace Lindrum	39–32	Tom Newman	13–18 December	Thurston's Hall, London
Alec Brown	47–24	Melbourne Inman	27 December–1 January	Thurston's Hall, London
Horace Lindrum	39–32	Alec Brown	3–8 January	Thurston's Hall, London
Willie Smith	38–33	Tom Newman	10–15 January	Thurston's Hall, London
Joe Davis	38–33	Sidney Smith	10–15 January	Houldsworth Hall, Manchester
Sidney Smith	43–28	Melbourne Inman	17–22 January	Thurston's Hall, London
Joe Davis	37–34	Horace Lindrum	24–29 January	Thurston's Hall, London

Table

Pos	Player	Pld	MW	FW
1	(England) Joe Davis	6	5	234
2	(England) Willie Smith	6	4	219
3	(Australia) Horace Lindrum	6	3	224
4	(England) Alec Brown	6	3	219
5	(England) Sidney Smith	6	3	214
6	(England) Tom Newman	6	3	212
7	(England) Melbourne Inman	6	0	169

The positions were determined firstly by the number of matches won (MW) and, in the event of a tie, the number of frames won (FW).
