= 1953/1954 News of the World Snooker Tournament =

News of the World Tournament
Tournament information
- Dates: 7 September 1953 – 16 January 1954
- Venue: Leicester Square Hall
- City: London
- Country: United Kingdom
- Format: Non-Ranking event
- Total prize fund: £1500
- Winner's share: £500

Final
- Champion: (England) John Pulman
- Runner-up: (England) Joe Davis

The 1953/1954 News of the World Snooker Tournament was a professional snooker tournament sponsored by the News of the World. The tournament was won by John Pulman who won 7 of his 8 matches and finished ahead of Joe Davis who won 5 matches. The News of the World Snooker Tournament ran from 1949/50 to 1959.

== Format ==
The 1953/54 event was a round-robin snooker tournament and was played from 7 September 1953 to 16 January 1954. All matches were played at Leicester Square Hall in London. There were 9 competitors and a total of 36 matches. The competitors were Joe Davis, Fred Davis, Walter Donaldson, John Barrie, Albert Brown, Alec Brown, John Pulman, Jackie Rea and Rex Williams. Sidney Smith was due to participate, but withdrew before the tournament started. Each match lasted three days and was the best of 37 frames.

Each match was separately handicapped. Joe Davis played level with Fred Davis and gave Walter Donaldson 14, John Barrie, Albert Brown, Alec Brown and John Pulman 21 and Jackie Rea and Rex Williams 25. Fred Davis gave Walter Donaldson 7, Albert Brown 10, John Pulman 12, John Barrie 14, Alec Brown 16 and Jackie Rea and Rex Williams 18. Walter Donaldson gave Albert Brown 7, Alec Brown and John Pulman 12, John Barrie 14 and Jackie Rea and Rex Williams 18. Albert Brown gave Alec Brown and John Pulman 5, John Barrie 8 and Jackie Rea and Rex Williams 14. John Pulman played level with Alec Brown and gave John Barrie 7 and Jackie Rea and Rex Williams 14. John Barrie played level with Alec Brown and gave Jackie Rea 7. Alec Brown gave Jackie Rea 5 and Rex Williams 9. Jackie Rea played level with Rex Williams.

Nineteen century breaks were made during the tournament, ten of them by Joe Davis.

== Results ==
John Pulman made certain of winning the tournament by beating John Barrie on 30 December

Fred Davis beat his brother Joe 21–16 in the final match of the tournament. Joe was already assured of second place but the win gave Fred third place.

Fred Davis scored the first century of the tournament, a break of 102, on the second day of his match against Walter Donaldson. Donaldson made a break of 120 the following day. In the next match Joe Davis made a break of 131 against Donaldson.

Winner	Score	Loser	Date	Ref
Alec Brown	19–18	Rex Williams	7–9 September	
Rex Williams	20–17	Albert Brown	10–12 September	
John Barrie	25–12	Albert Brown	14–16 September	
John Barrie	19–18	Walter Donaldson	17–19 September	
Jackie Rea	19–18	Alec Brown	21–23 September	
John Pulman	20–17	Jackie Rea	24–26 September	
Alec Brown	20–17	Fred Davis	28–30 September	
Fred Davis	25–12	Walter Donaldson	1–3 October	
Joe Davis	22–15	Walter Donaldson	5–7 October	
John Pulman	20–17	Joe Davis	8–10 October	
Albert Brown	23–14	Jackie Rea	12–14 October	
Fred Davis	22–15	Albert Brown	15–17 October	
Joe Davis	20–17	Jackie Rea	19–21 October	
John Barrie	w/o–w/d	Rex Williams	22–24 October	
John Pulman	22–15	Rex Williams	26–28 October	
John Pulman	25–12	Fred Davis	29–31 October	
Joe Davis	22–15	Alec Brown	2–4 November	
Alec Brown	20–17	John Barrie	5–7 November	
Jackie Rea	20–17	Walter Donaldson	9–11 November	
Rex Williams	23–14	Walter Donaldson	12–14 November	
John Pulman	24–13	Albert Brown	16–18 November	
Joe Davis	23–14	John Barrie	19–21 November	
John Barrie	19–18	Fred Davis	23–25 November	
Fred Davis	19–18	Jackie Rea	26–28 November	
John Pulman	25–12	Alec Brown	30 November–2 December	
Joe Davis	22–15	Rex Williams	3–5 December	
Albert Brown	23–14	Joe Davis	7–9 December	
Walter Donaldson	24–13	Alec Brown	10–12 December	
Jackie Rea	20–17	John Barrie	14–16 December	
Jackie Rea	25–12	Rex Williams	17–19 December	
John Pulman	24–13	John Barrie	28–30 December	
Walter Donaldson	31–6	Albert Brown	31 December–2 January	
Rex Williams	19–18	Fred Davis	4–6 January	
Alec Brown	23–14	Albert Brown	7–9 January	
Walter Donaldson	20–17	John Pulman	11–13 January	
Fred Davis	21–16	Joe Davis	14–16 January	

Table

Pos	Player	Pld	MY	FW	FL	Prize
1	(England) John Pulman	8	7	177	119	£500
2	(England) Joe Davis	8	5	156	140	?
3	(England) Fred Davis	8	4	152	144	?
4	(Northern Ireland) Jackie Rea	8	4	150	146	?
5	(England) John Barrie	8	4	143	153	
6	(England) Alec Brown	8	4	140	156	
7	(Scotland) Walter Donaldson	8	3	151	145	
8	(England) Rex Williams	8	3	140	156	?
9	(England) Albert Brown	8	2	123	173	

The positions were determined firstly by the number of matches won (MW) and, in the event of a tie, the number of frames won (FW). Rex Williams was ill for his match against John Barrie from 22 to 24 October. Barrie played an exhibition match against Kingsley Kennerley instead, and was awarded a 19–18 win against Williams.

== Qualifying ==
The qualifying tournament was played from 25 May to 13 June 1953 at Leicester Square Hall in London. There were 3 competitors: Sydney Lee, Jim Lees and Rex Williams. Matches were over 71 frames, except in the match between Lee and Williams which was over 59 frames. The qualifying was won by Rex Williams who advanced to the main event.

=== Qualifying results ===
Winner	Score	Loser	Date	Ref
Rex Williams	50–21	Jim Lees	25 – 30 May	
Rex Williams	40–19	Sydney Lee	1 – 6 June	
Sydney Lee	41–30	Jim Lees	8 – 13 June	

== Broadcasting ==
The BBC showed two short TV programmes during the matches between John Barrie and Albert Brown on 16 September, and between Walter Donaldson and Alec Brown on 12 December. The commentator on both occasions was Sidney Smith.
