= 1951/1952 News of the World Snooker Tournament =

News of the World Tournament
Tournament information
- Dates: 10 September 1951 – 19 January 1952
- Venue: Leicester Square Hall
- City: London
- Country: United Kingdom
- Format: Non-Ranking event
- Total prize fund: £1500
- Winner's share: £500
- Highest break: (England) Albert Brown (140)

Final
- Champion: (England) Sidney Smith
- Runner-up: (England) Albert Brown

The 1951/1952 News of the World Snooker Tournament was a professional snooker tournament sponsored by the News of the World. The tournament was won by Sidney Smith who won 6 of his 8 matches. He finished ahead of Albert Brown who also won 6 matches but won one fewer frame overall. The News of the World Snooker Tournament ran from 1949/50 to 1959.

== Format ==
The 1951/52 event was a round-robin snooker tournament and was played from 10 September 1951 to 19 January 1952. All matches were played at Leicester Square Hall in London. There were 9 competitors, one more than previous years, and a total of 36 matches. The competitors were the 8 who had played in the previous year's event, Joe Davis, Fred Davis, Walter Donaldson, John Barrie, Albert Brown, Alec Brown, John Pulman, Jackie Rea, Sidney Smith, plus New Zealander Clark McConachy. Each match lasted three days and was the best of 37 frames.

Each match was separately handicapped. Joe Davis played level with Fred Davis and gave Walter Donaldson 7, John Pulman 18, Albert Brown, Alec Brown and Clark McConachy 21, Sidney Smith 24 and John Barrie 25. Fred Davis played level with Walter Donaldson and gave Sidney Smith 12, Albert Brown and Alec Brown and John Pulman 14, Clark McConachy 16 and John Barrie 18. Walter Donaldson gave Albert Brown and Sidney Smith 7, John Pulman 8, Clark McConachy 10, Alec Brown 14 and John Barrie 15. John Pulman played level with Alec Brown, Albert Brown, Sidney Smith and Clark McConachy and gave John Barrie 10. Sidney Smith played level with Albert Brown and Clark McConachy and gave Alec Brown 4 and John Barrie 10. Albert Brown played level with Albert Brown and Clark McConachy and gave John Barrie 10. Clark McConachy gave Alec Brown 7 and John Barrie 10. Alec Brown gave John Barrie 9.

== Results ==
With three matches to be played there were three players with 5 wins. John Barrie had played all his matches and won 161 frames. Albert Brown and Sidney Smith each had one match left. Brown had won 149 frames while Smith had won 148. Albert Brown played Alec Brown in his last match. Alec Brown led 16–12 after the final afternoon session but Albert Brown won all 7 frames in the evening session to win 19–18.

After Albert Brown's 19–18 win, Sidney Smith needed to beat Walter Donaldson 21–16 to win the tournament. Smith led 16–14 after the final afternoon session but Donaldson won the first two frames on the final evening to tie the match at 16–16. Smith then won the last 5 frames to win the match 21–16 and take the tournament by a single frame, 169 to Brown's 168.

In the last match of the tournament Fred Davis beat brother Joe 20–17, playing on level terms. Fred had breaks of 108 and 101 on the second day.

Albert Brown had met Walter Donaldson earlier in January. Donaldson led 9–3 after the first day, scoring a break of 104 in the last frame of the day. Brown made a break of 140 on the second evening but Donaldson increased his lead to 17–7 at the end of the day. On the final day Brown staged a comeback and won the first 7 frames of the day. Donaldson, however, held on and won the match 18–17.

Winner	Score	Loser	Date
John Pulman	21–16	Alec Brown	10–12 September
Albert Brown	23–14	John Pulman	13–15 September
Albert Brown	27–10	Clark McConachy	17–19 September
Walter Donaldson	24–13	Clark McConachy	20–22 September
John Barrie	22–15	Joe Davis	24–26 September
Sidney Smith	23–14	John Barrie	27–29 September
Alec Brown	23–14	Fred Davis	1–3 October
Fred Davis	22–15	Walter Donaldson	4–6 October
Joe Davis	26–11	Walter Donaldson	8–10 October
Sidney Smith	20–17	Joe Davis	11–13 October
Albert Brown	20–17	John Barrie	15–17 October
Albert Brown	22–15	Fred Davis	18–20 October
John Barrie	25–12	Alec Brown	22–24 October
John Pulman	29–8	Clark McConachy	25–27 October
John Pulman	20–17	Sidney Smith	29–31 October
Sidney Smith	26–11	Fred Davis	1–3 November
Alec Brown	19–18	Joe Davis	5–7 November
Alec Brown	27–10	Clark McConachy	8–10 November
John Barrie	20–17	Walter Donaldson	12–14 November
Walter Donaldson	21–16	John Pulman	15–17 November
Albert Brown	23–14	Sidney Smith	19–21 November
Joe Davis	26–11	Clark McConachy	22–24 November
Fred Davis	20–17	Clark McConachy	26–28 November
Fred Davis	22–15	John Barrie	29 November–1 December
Sidney Smith	22–15	Alec Brown	3–5 December
John Pulman	21–16	Joe Davis	6–8 December
Joe Davis	21–16	Albert Brown	10–12 December
Walter Donaldson	20–17	Alec Brown	13–15 December
John Barrie	27–10	Clark McConachy	17–19 December
John Barrie	21–16	John Pulman	20–22 December
Sidney Smith	26–11	Clark McConachy	31 December–2 January
Walter Donaldson	19–18	Albert Brown	3–5 January
Fred Davis	21–16	John Pulman	7–9 January
Albert Brown	19–18	Alec Brown	10–12 January
Sidney Smith	21–16	Walter Donaldson	14–16 January
Fred Davis	20–17	Joe Davis	17–19 January

Table

Pos	Player	Pld	MW	FW	Prize
1	(England) Sidney Smith	8	6	169	£500
2	(England) Albert Brown	8	6	168	?
3	(England) John Barrie	8	5	161	?
4	(England) Fred Davis	8	5	145	?
5	(England) John Pulman	8	4	153	?
6	(Scotland) Walter Donaldson	8	4	143	?
7	(England) Joe Davis	8	3	156	?
8	(England) Alec Brown	8	3	147	?
9	(New Zealand) Clark McConachy	8	0	90	?

The positions were determined firstly by the number of matches won (MW) and, in the event of a tie, the number of frames won (FW).

== Qualifying ==
With the main event starting earlier than in previous years, the qualifying tournament was also earlier and was held from 28 May to 16 June 1951. These matches were also played at Leicester Square Hall in London. There were 3 competitors: John Barrie, Kingsley Kennerley and Sydney Lee. Unlike the main event, each match lasted six days and was the best of 73 frames. Barrie won both his matches to qualify. Kennerley beat Lee in the other match.
