= 1950 Sporting Record Masters' Snooker Tournament =

Sporting Record Masters' Snooker Tournament
Tournament information
- Dates: 3 April – 10 June 1950
- Venue: Leicester Square Hall
- City: London
- Country: England
- Format: Non-Ranking event
- Total prize fund: £500
- Winner's share: £270

Final
- Champion: (England) Joe Davis
- Runner-up: (England) Sidney Smith

The 1950 Sporting Record Masters' Snooker Tournament was a professional snooker tournament sponsored by the Sporting Record newspaper. Entry was restricted to past finalists in the World Snooker Championship. The tournament was won by Joe Davis with Sidney Smith finishing in second place. It was the only time the tournament was held.

== Format ==
The event was a round-robin snooker tournament and was played from 3 April to 10 June 1950. All matches were played at Leicester Square Hall in London. Initially there were 5 competitors and a total of 10 matches were planned. The competitors were Joe Davis, Fred Davis, Walter Donaldson, Horace Lindrum and Sidney Smith. Each match lasted six days and was the best of 70 frames. Three points were available for each match, one for winner of the match, one for leader after the first 35 frames and one for the winner over the last 35 frames.

Each player was given a handicap at the start of the tournament. The handicaps were: Joe Davis, Fred Davis and Donaldson: 0, Smith: 21 and Lindrum: 23. The player with the higher handicap received a start in each frame, being the difference between the two handicaps.

Horace Lindrum withdrew from the event complaining about his overly generous handicap of 23 points which would give the public the wrong impression about his ability. It was also announced that Lindrum had retired from snooker but Lindrum later issued a statement stating that he had not retired "in any sense whatever." His elder daughter Jan was born in London during the period when Lindrum should have been playing his first match.

== Results ==
Winner	Score	Loser	Dates
Joe Davis	43–27 (19–16 & 24–11)	Walter Donaldson	3–8 April
Fred Davis	41–29 (23–12 & 18–17)	Walter Donaldson	17–22 April
Sidney Smith	46–24 (22–13 & 24–11)	Fred Davis	1–6 May
Joe Davis	43–27 (21–14 & 22–13)	Fred Davis	15–20 May
Sidney Smith	37–33 (20–15 & 17–18)	Walter Donaldson	22–27 May
Joe Davis	37–33 (17–18 & 20–15)	Sidney Smith	5–10 June

The original 10-week schedule was retained, despite Lindrum's withdrawal. This meant that there were 4 weeks when no match was played. The first match was played over 5 days rather than 6 because Good Friday fell on 7 April. The first 35 frames finished after the afternoon session on the Wednesday. After 5 days of the Sidney Smith/Fred Davis match Smith was leading 41–18 with a 19–5 lead in the second half of the match. The final score for Sidney Smith versus Fred Davis was 46–24.

Table

Pos	Player	Pld	Pts	Prize
1	(England) Joe Davis	3	8	£270
2	(England) Sidney Smith	3	6	£110
3	(England) Fred Davis	3	3	£65
4	(Scotland) Walter Donaldson	3	1	£55
