= 1935 Daily Mail Gold Cup =

The 1935 Daily Mail Gold Cup was a professional billiards tournament sponsored by the Daily Mail. Tom Newman won the Gold Cup, winning all his four matches, ahead of Willie Smith who had three wins. It was the first Daily Mail Gold Cup tournament, an event which ran from 1935 to 1940.

== Format ==
The event was a round-robin tournament played from 7 January to 16 March 1935 at Thurston's Hall in London, England. There were 5 competitors and a total of 10 matches. Each match lasted six days (Monday to Saturday) and consisted of two sessions of two hours each day. The 5 competitors were Joe Davis, Tom Newman, Willie Smith, Melbourne Inman and Tom Reece. The event was a sealed handicap in which the handicap was determined before the event started but was not disclosed to the players until after the tournament finished.

== Results ==
Winner	Score	H'cap	Total	Loser	Score	H'cap	Total	Dates
Tom Reece	5,474	1,000	6,474	Melbourne Inman	5,674	–	5,674	7–12 January
Tom Newman	10,973	1,000	11,973	Joe Davis	11,067	–	11,067	14–19 January
Willie Smith	14,289	–	14,289	Tom Reece	4,252	8,000	12,252	21–26 January
Joe Davis	15,605	–	15,605	Melbourne Inman	4,654	8,000	12,654	28 January–2 February
Tom Newman	11,260	–	11,260	Willie Smith	8,252	500	8,752	4–9 February
Joe Davis	16,093	–	16,093	Tom Reece	5,997	9,000	14,997	11–16 February
Willie Smith	12,821	–	12,821	Melbourne Inman	3,845	7,000	10,845	18–23 February
Tom Newman	14,943	–	14,943	Tom Reece	4,412	9,000	13,412	25 February–2 March
Willie Smith	11,255	1,500	12,755	Joe Davis	8,959	–	8,959	4–9 March
Tom Newman	12,444	–	12,444	Melbourne Inman	4,261	7,000	11,261	11–16 March

Table

Pos	Player	Pld	Won
1	(England) Tom Newman	4	4
2	(England) Willie Smith	4	3
3	(England) Joe Davis	4	2
4	(England) Tom Reece	4	1
5	(England) Melbourne Inman	4	0
