= 1959 News of the World Snooker Plus Tournament =

Snooker variant tournament

News of the World Tournament
Tournament information
- Dates: 26 October – 21 November 1959
- Venue: Burroughes Hall
- City: London
- Country: United Kingdom
- Total prize fund: £750
- Winner's share: £400
- Highest break: Joe Davis (ENG) (117)

Final
- Champion: (England) Joe Davis
- Runner-up: (England) Fred Davis

The 1959 News of the World Snooker Plus Tournament was a professional snooker tournament sponsored by the News of the World. The event was played under the Snooker Plus rules, a variant of snooker with two additional colours (orange and purple). The tournament was won by Joe Davis with Fred Davis finishing in second place. It was the eleventh and final News of the World Tournament, which ran from 1949/50 to 1959.

== Snooker plus ==
Snooker plus table layout

Colour	Value
Red	1 point
Yellow	2 points
Green	3 points
Brown	4 points
Blue	5 points
Pink	6 points
Black	7 points
Orange	8 points
Purple	10 points

Snooker plus was a variant of snooker created by Joe Davis in 1959 with two additional colours, orange (8 points) and purple (10 points). The orange spot was midway between the pink and blue, while the purple spot was midway between the brown and blue. If a frame ended in a tie, the purple was re-spotted on the black spot. The extra colours allowed a maximum break of 210 (maximum break of 221 with free ball). This variant failed to gain popularity but has appeared in some video games such as the World Snooker Championship series.

== Format ==
There were three competitors, Joe Davis, Fred Davis and John Pulman, competing for prize money of £750. Matches were of 25 frames over two days. Each played the other, three times. All matches were played in Burroughes Hall, London.

== Results ==
Joe Davis made the first century break, 108, on the opening day of the tournament.

Joe Davis made sure of victory by beating John Pulman in the penultimate match. Fred Davis lost the last match 13–12, but he had needed to win only 11 frames to finish in second place ahead of Pulman.

Winner	Score	Loser	Dates	Ref
Joe Davis	17–8	Fred Davis	26–27 October	
John Pulman	15–10	Fred Davis	28–29 October	
Joe Davis	14–11	John Pulman	30–31 October	
John Pulman	14–11	Fred Davis	9–10 November	
Joe Davis	15–10	John Pulman	11–12 November	
Fred Davis	15–10	Joe Davis	13–14 November	
Fred Davis	16–9	John Pulman	16–17 November	
Joe Davis	14–11	John Pulman	18–19 November	
Joe Davis	13–12	Fred Davis	20–21 November	

Table

Pos	Player	Pld	MW	FW	Prize
1	(England) Joe Davis	6	5	83	£400
2	(England) Fred Davis	6	2	72	£250
3	(England) John Pulman	6	2	70	£100

The positions were determined firstly by the number of matches won (MW) and, in the event of a tie, the number of frames won (FW).

== Century breaks ==
The following century breaks were made at the tournament.

- 117, 115, 108 – Joe Davis
- 112, 104 – John Pulman
- 112 – Fred Davis
