= 1938/1939 Daily Mail Gold Cup =

Daily Mail Gold Cup
Tournament information
- Dates: 10 October 1938 – 21 January 1939
- Final venue: Thurston's Hall
- Final city: London
- Country: United Kingdom
- Format: Non-Ranking event
- Highest break: (England) Joe Davis (138)

Final
- Champion: (England) Alec Brown
- Runner-up: (England) Sidney Smith

The 1938/1939 Daily Mail Gold Cup was a professional snooker tournament sponsored by the Daily Mail. The cup was won by Alec Brown with Sidney Smith finishing in second place in the final table. It was the fifth Daily Mail Gold Cup tournament, although only the third as a snooker event. The Daily Mail Gold Cup ran from 1935 to 1940.

== Format ==
The 1938/1939 event was a round-robin snooker tournament and was played from 10 October 1938 to 21 January 1939. Most of the matches were played at Thurston's Hall in London. There were 6 competitors and a total of 15 matches. As previously, each match was of 71 frames and lasted six days. The 6 competitors were the same as in the 1937/38 event without Melbourne Inman. The handicap system was revised, each match having a separate handicap.

Joe Davis gave Horace Lindrum 20, Sidney Smith 30, Willie Smith 25, Alec Brown 35 and Tom Newman 40. Horace Lindrum gave Sidney Smith 7, Willie Smith 14, Alec Brown 21 and Tom Newman 30. Sidney Smith gave Willie Smith and Alec Brown 7 and Tom Newman 14. Willie Smith and Alec Brown gave Tom Newman 7. Willie Smith and Alec Brown played level.

== Results ==
Joe Davis was given a harsher handicap than previously. He won his first two matches but then lost heavily to Sidney Smith (giving 30 point per frame) and Alec Brown (giving 35). Giving 20 points per frame, he lost the final match of the tournament against Horace Lindrum. Davis led 35–33 but lost the last three to lose the match by the odd frame.

On 14 November, in frame 4 of the match between Tom Newman and Alec Brown there was a "peculiar incident". Brown had potted a red and was between the pack and the black. Rather than play a shot with the long rest, bridging over the pack, Brown took a "cue" from his pocket. It was made of ebony and was about the size of a pencil. He chalked it and played a shot onto the black. After some discussion the referee, Charles Chambers, called a "foul" explaining that, according to the rules, "a stroke must be made with the tip of the cue" and "a pen is not a cue" even if it had a cue-tip on the end. Brown won the frame 78–41, the afternoon session ending at 3 frames each.

During the tournament Joe Davis scored a new official record break of 138, beating the previous record of 137. It happened in his match against Alec Brown on 9 December. Davis was conceding 35 points to Brown in this match. Brown made only two visits to the table before Davis made the total clearance which included the 15 reds with 11 blacks, a pink, two blues, a green and then all the colours. The clearance was in frame 53 of the match, the fifth of the afternoon session.

Winner	Score	Loser	Dates	Venue
Sidney Smith	41–30	Willie Smith	10–15 October	Thurston's Hall, London
Joe Davis	37–34	Tom Newman	17–22 October	Thurston's Hall, London
Alec Brown	46–25	Horace Lindrum	24–29 October	Thurston's Hall, London
Joe Davis	40–31	Willie Smith	31 October–5 November	Thurston's Hall, London
Sidney Smith	40–31	Horace Lindrum	7–12 November	Thurston's Hall, London
Tom Newman	37–34	Alec Brown	14–19 November	Thurston's Hall, London
Sidney Smith	42–29	Joe Davis	21–26 November	Thurston's Hall, London
Tom Newman	38–33	Willie Smith	28 November–3 December	Thurston's Hall, London
Alec Brown	42–29	Joe Davis	5–10 December	Thurston's Hall, London
Tom Newman	45–26	Horace Lindrum	12–17 December	Thurston's Hall, London
Alec Brown	38–33	Willie Smith	12–17 December	Glasgow
Willie Smith	37–34	Horace Lindrum	2–7 January	Thurston's Hall, London
Sidney Smith	36–35	Tom Newman	2–7 January	Greyfriars Hall, Nottingham
Alec Brown	40–31	Sidney Smith	9–14 January	Thurston's Hall, London
Horace Lindrum	36–35	Joe Davis	16–21 January	Houldsworth Hall, Manchester

Table

Pos	Player	Pld	MW	FW
1	(England) Alec Brown	5	4	200
2	(England) Sidney Smith	5	4	190
3	(England) Tom Newman	5	3	189
4	(England) Joe Davis	5	2	170
5	(England) Willie Smith	5	1	164
6	(Australia) Horace Lindrum	5	1	152

The positions were determined firstly by the number of matches won (MW) and, in the event of a tie, the number of frames won (FW).
