= 1934 World Snooker Championship =

Professional snooker tournament

Tournament information
- Dates: 2–6 April 1934
- Venue: Lounge Hall / Central Hall
- City: Nottingham / Kettering
- Country: England
- Organisation: BACC

Final
- Champion: Joe Davis (ENG)
- Runner-up: Tom Newman (ENG)
- Score: 25–22

The 1934 World Snooker Championship, known at the time as the Professional Championship of Snooker, was a snooker tournament held partly at the Lounge Hall in Nottingham and then at the Central Hall in Kettering, from 2 to 6 April 1934. Joe Davis won the title for the eighth time by defeating Tom Newman, the only other entrant, by 25 frames to 22. At one stage Newman led 14–13, but Davis then pulled ahead to lead 24–18 and, although Newman won the next four frames, Davis took the 47th frame to secure the title. Davis compiled a break of 70 in the third frame.

== Background ==
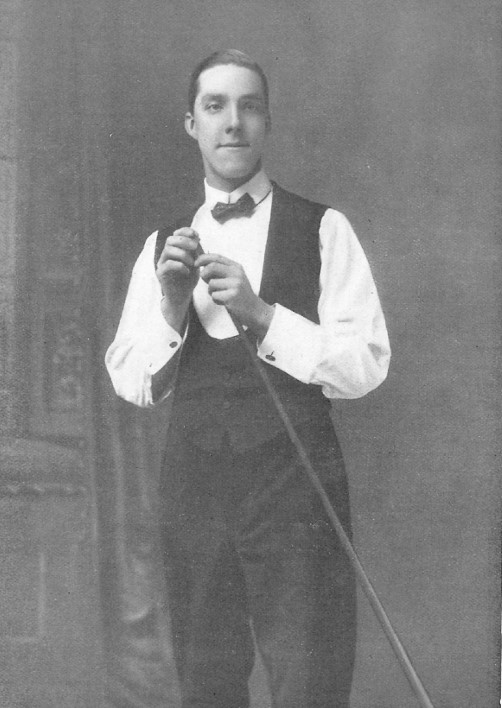
Tom Newman (pictured circa 1913).

The World Snooker Championship is a professional tournament and the official world championship of the game of snooker. The sport was developed in the late 19th century by British Army soldiers stationed in India. Professional English billiards player and billiard hall manager Joe Davis noticed the increasing popularity of snooker compared to billiards in the 1920s, and with Birmingham-based billiards equipment manager Bill Camkin, persuaded the Billiards Association and Control Council (BACC) to recognise an official professional snooker championship in the 1926–27 season. In 1927, the final of the first professional snooker championship was held at Camkin's Hall; Davis won the tournament by beating Tom Dennis in the final. The annual competition was not titled the World Championship until 1935, but the 1927 tournament is now referred to as the first World Snooker Championship. Davis had also won the title every year from 1928 to 1933.

For the 1934 championship, it was announced that the preliminary heats and semi-finals were to be best of 25 frames, played over three days, with the final contested over 49 frames across six days. The entry fee was set at five guineas per player (equivalent to £325 in 2025), with a five guineas sidestake required for each match. Entry fees would be used to provide prize money for the finalists, with 60 per cent going to the champion, and gate receipts for each match would be divided equally, after expenses (including 5 per cent of the gross receipts for the BACC), between the two players concerned. Entries were required by 19 February.

== Summary ==
Only two players entered, Joe Davis and Tom Newman, and thus just the final was contested. The match was scheduled from 2 April to 6 April and was over 49 frames. There were ten frames played each day with five frames in the afternoon and five in the evening (four on the final day). The first three days were held at The Lounge, Shakespeare Street, Nottingham with the final two days being played at the Central Hall, Kettering. The match was promoted by Howarth Nuttall, and refereed by Willie Leigh.

After the first day the score was level at five frames each. Davis made a break of 70 in the third frame but Newman ended the session 3–2 ahead. Newman won the next two frames to lead 5–2 but Davis took the last three to level the scores, winning the eighth frame 112–0. On the second day Newman won the afternoon session 3–2 and took the first frame in the evening. Davis then won the last four frames to lead 11–9. For the third day in a row Newman won the afternoon session 3–2 and then took the first two frames in the evening to take the lead 14–13. Davis again finished well, winning the final three frames to lead 16–14 overnight.

On the fourth day Davis won both sessions 3–2 to increase his lead to 22–18. On the final day he took the first two frames to lead 24–18, needing just one frame for victory. Newman, however, took the last three frames in the afternoon and the first in the evening before Davis won the 47th frame 72–55 to secure victory at 25–22. After dead frames, the score was 26–23 to Davis.

There was a good audience attendance for each session, including a sell-out crowd for the fourth session. The championship trophy was presented by H. Hodge, chairman of Kettering Urban Council. In speeches after the presentation, Davis commended Newman for his sportsmanship, and Newman acclaimed Davis as the best snooker player in the world.

== Final ==
Final: Best of 49 frames. Lounge Hall in Nottingham and then at the Central Hall, Kettering, England, 2–6 April 1934. Referee: Willie Leigh.
Joe Davis; England	25–22	Tom Newman; England
Day 1: 74–40, 45–53, 91–25 (70), 51–64, 64–70, 33–67, 26–80, 112–0, 63–31, 85–18; Day 2: 60–63, 33–84, 67–37, 57–58, 77–45, 31–110, 66–52, 120–1, 74–58, 96–29; Day 3: 56–45, 61–67, 44–68, 60–39, 18–89, 58–69, 21–87, 83–60, 80–29, 102–31; Day 4: 43–64, 70–45, 96–37, 59–33, 43–53, 52–53, 90–30, 51–72, 83–26, 50–39; Day 5: 54–40, 58–49, 37–87, 39–76, 54–61, 34–84, 72–55
