= 1939/1940 Daily Mail Gold Cup =

Daily Mail Gold Cup
Tournament information
- Dates: 16 October 1939 – 10 February 1940
- Final venue: Thurston's Hall
- Final city: London
- Country: United Kingdom
- Format: Non-Ranking event

Final
- Champion: (England) Alec Brown
- Runner-up: (England) Sydney Lee

The 1939/1940 Daily Mail Gold Cup was a professional snooker tournament sponsored by the Daily Mail. The cup was won by Alec Brown with Sydney Lee finishing in second place in the final table. It was the sixth and last Daily Mail Gold Cup tournament, although only the fourth as a snooker event. The Daily Mail Gold Cup ran from 1935 to 1940.

== Format ==
The 1939/1940 event was a round-robin snooker tournament and was played from 16 October 1939 to 10 February 1940. Most of the matches were played at Thurston's Hall in London. There were 7 competitors and a total of 21 matches. Each match lasted six days and was the best of 61 frames, a reduction from the 71 frames played in previous years. The 7 included three competitors new to the event: Fred Davis, Walter Donaldson and Sydney Lee. The handicap system was the same as the previous year, each match having a separate handicap.

Joe Davis gave Sidney Smith 20, Alec Brown 25, Walter Donaldson 25, Fred Davis 30, Tom Newman 40 and Sydney Lee 45. Sidney Smith played level with Alec Brown and gave Walter Donaldson 10, Fred Davis 15, Tom Newman 20 and Sydney Lee 30. Alec Brown played level with Walter Donaldson and gave Fred Davis 10, Tom Newman 10 and Sydney Lee 25. Walter Donaldson played level with Fred Davis 15 and gave Tom Newman 10 and Sydney Lee 20. Fred Davis gave Tom Newman 10 and Sydney Lee 25. Tom Newman gave Sydney Lee 15.

== Results ==
Joe Davis struggled with the harsh handicaps given against him and lost his first three matches. He then had a remarkable win against Sydney Lee. Conceding 45 points in every frame, Davis was 16–14 behind after three days play. He then won 16 of the 20 frames on the next two days to lead 30–20 and eventually won 35–26. Joe lost to brother Fred but won his last match against Sidney Smith. With a 20-point advantage, Smith led 29–26 but Davis won the first 5 frames of the final evening session to win the match and avoid the "wooden spoon".

Winner	Score	Loser	Dates	Venue
Fred Davis	40–21	Sidney Smith	16–21 October	Thurston's Hall, London
Alec Brown	39–22	Joe Davis	23–28 October	Thurston's Hall, London
Walter Donaldson	32–29	Tom Newman	30 October–4 November	Thurston's Hall, London
Sydney Lee	37–24	Sidney Smith	6–11 November	Thurston's Hall, London
Fred Davis	32–29	Tom Newman	13–18 November	Thurston's Hall, London
Walter Donaldson	34–27	Joe Davis	20–25 November	Thurston's Hall, London
Alec Brown	33–28	Sidney Smith	27 November–2 December	Thurston's Hall, London
Tom Newman	35–26	Joe Davis	4–9 December	Thurston's Hall, London
Fred Davis	31–30	Sydney Lee	11–16 December	Thurston's Hall, London
Sidney Smith	33–28	Walter Donaldson	18–23 December	Thurston's Hall, London
Alec Brown	36–25	Tom Newman	1–6 January	Thurston's Hall, London
Sydney Lee	39–22	Walter Donaldson	1–6 January	Burroughes Hall, London
Joe Davis	35–26	Sydney Lee	8–13 January	Thurston's Hall, London
Alec Brown	35–26	Fred Davis	8–13 January	Manchester
Alec Brown	35–26	Walter Donaldson	15–20 January	Thurston's Hall, London
Tom Newman	32–29	Sidney Smith	15–20 January	Burroughes Hall, London
Fred Davis	35–26	Joe Davis	15–20 January	Houldsworth Hall, Manchester
Sydney Lee	37–24	Tom Newman	22–27 January	Thurston's Hall, London
Walter Donaldson	37–24	Fred Davis	29 January–3 February	Thurston's Hall, London
Sydney Lee	37–24	Alec Brown	29 January–3 February	Hayes, Middlesex
Joe Davis	31–30	Sidney Smith	5–10 February	Thurston's Hall, London

Table

Pos	Player	Pld	MW	FW
1	(England) Alec Brown	6	5	202
2	(England) Sydney Lee	6	4	206
3	(England) Fred Davis	6	4	188
4	(Scotland) Walter Donaldson	6	3	179
5	(England) Tom Newman	6	2	174
6	(England) Joe Davis	6	2	167
7	(England) Sidney Smith	6	1	165

The positions were determined firstly by the number of matches won (MW) and, in the event of a tie, the number of frames won (FW).
