= Claude Falkiner =

Player of English billiards

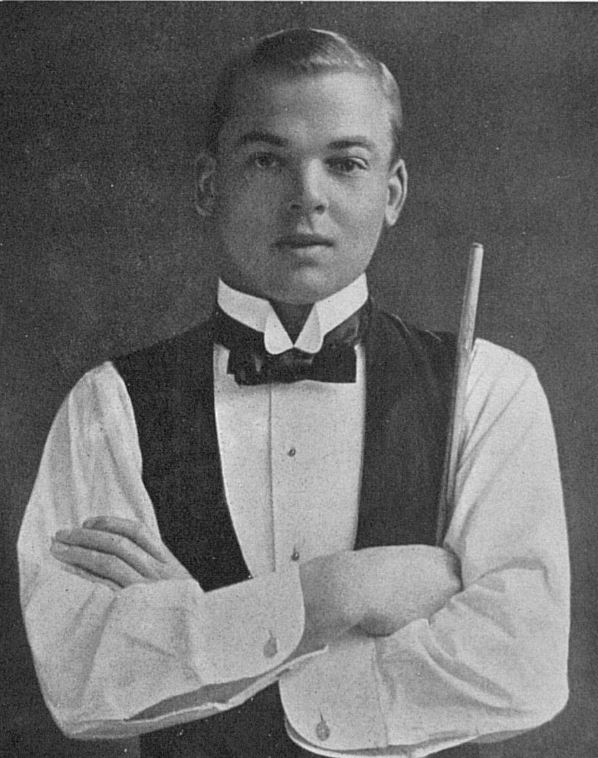
- Falkiner c. 1915
- Born: 11 July 1885; Featherstone, Yorkshire
- Died: 1979 (aged 95)
- Sport country: England
- Best ranking finish: Runner-up, Professional Billiards Championship 1920, 1922

Claude Falkiner (died 1979) was an English player of English billiards. He was runner-up in the professional championship in 1920 and 1922. He also entered the 1939 World Snooker Championship.

== Biography ==
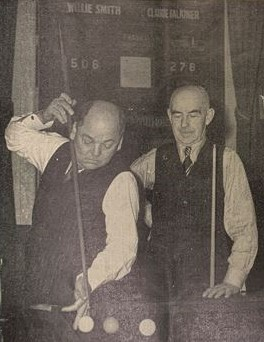
Claude Falkiner (left) and Willie Smith in 1949

Claude Falkiner was born in Featherstone, Yorkshire, on 11 July 1885. His father managed a billiard hall in South Kirkby, and Falkiner started playing English billiards there when he was about 12. He worked in a coal mine from the ages of 14 to 17, whilst continuing to practive the game, and made his first break over 500 in 1907.

Along with Tom Newman, Falkiner was one of the first players to develop nursery cannon play, saying that he had learnt it from a French player whilst in France during World War I. In 1920, he was runner-up to Willie Smith in the professional championship. The following year, he lost to the eventual champion Newman in the semi-finals, and in 1922 was runner up to Newman, who defeated him 16,000–15,167 in the final. In 1923 he lost in the semi-finals by 8,695–16,000 to Smith, and in 1924, he decided to tour overseas rather than enter the championship, and did not enter again until 1930.

He introduced Walter Lindrum to nursery cannons whilst playing him in Australia in 1924, a method which Lindrum, according to snooker historian Clive Everton, would go on to use with "devastating effect." At the 1930 professional championship, Falkiner lost to defending champion Joe Davis. He participated in the 1935/1936 Daily Mail Gold Cup, finishing last after failing to win any of his six matches.

After missing the professional championship for eight years, Falkiner entered again. He also took part in the 1939 World Snooker Championship. In the Snooker Championship, his first competitive cue sports match in several years, he faced Walter Donaldson. Falkiner took three of the five frames in the first session, the pair 5–5 after the first day. Donaldson won four of the five frames in both of the sessions on the second day to lead 13–7. On the final day Donaldson took a 16–8 winning lead and ended 21–10 ahead. The correspondent for The Times, whilst describing Donaldson as "a player of considerable skill", felt that Falkiner's lack of recent match experience contributed to his defeat. In the billiards championship, he lost in his first match, 6,545–11,157 to Sidney Smith.

He died in Bournemouth in 1979, aged 95.
