= 1936 Daily Mail Gold Cup =

Daily Mail Gold Cup
Tournament information
- Dates: 28 September – 19 December 1936
- Final venue: Thurston's Hall
- Final city: London
- Country: United Kingdom
- Format: Non-Ranking event
- Highest break: (England) Sidney Smith (133)

Final
- Champion: (England) Joe Davis
- Runner-up: (Australia) Horace Lindrum

The 1936 Daily Mail Gold Cup was a professional snooker tournament sponsored by the Daily Mail. Despite giving a handicap to all the other players, the cup was won by Joe Davis who won all his five matches. The Australian Horace Lindrum finished in second place in the final table. It was the third Daily Mail Gold Cup tournament, although the first two had been billiards events. The Daily Mail Gold Cup ran from 1935 to 1940.

== Format ==
The third event was a round-robin snooker tournament and was played from 28 September to 19 December 1936. Most of the matches were played at Thurston's Hall in London. There were 6 competitors and a total of 15 matches. Each match was of 71 frames, lasting six days (Monday to Saturday) and consisted of two sessions of six frames each day (five on the final evening). The 6 competitors were Joe Davis, Horace Lindrum, Sidney Smith, Willie Smith, Tom Newman and Melbourne Inman. The event had two handicapping aspects. Each player had a handicap which was given in each frame. The handicaps were: Joe Davis - 0, Horace Lindrum - 7, Sidney Smith - 14, Willie Smith - 18, Tom Newman - 24, Melbourne Inman - 35. In addition there was a sealed handicap for each match. This was an additional adjustment to be made after each match (a number of frames) which was kept secret until the end of the tournament. It seems that the handicapper decided to make no adjustments since the final table simply reflects the actual results.

== Results ==
The cup was won by Joe Davis who won all his five matches. Melbourne Inman, the six-time world billiards champion now in his late fifties, struggled, despite receiving the most generous handicap. The other four players were very close in the final table. Willie Smith won a prize for the most frames won in a match, 48 in his match against Melbourne Inman.

During the tournament Sidney Smith scored a record 133 break, becoming the first player to make a total clearance in snooker competition. It happened in his match against Tom Newman on 11 December. Smith was conceding 10 points to Newman in this match and went further behind when he went in-off a red. Smith then made the total clearance which included the 15 reds with six blacks, six pinks, two blues, a green and then all the colours. The clearance was in frame 58 of the match, the fourth of the evening session. Smith won the prize for the highest break of the tournament.

| Winner | Score | Loser | Dates | Venue |
|---|---|---|---|---|
| Sidney Smith | 44–27 | Melbourne Inman | 28 September–3 October | Thurston's Hall, London |
| Horace Lindrum | 37–34 | Tom Newman | 5–10 October | Thurston's Hall, London |
| Joe Davis | 39–32 | Willie Smith | 12–17 October | Thurston's Hall, London |
| Willie Smith | 48–23 | Melbourne Inman | 19–24 October | Thurston's Hall, London |
| Joe Davis | 42–29 | Tom Newman | 26–31 October | Thurston's Hall, London |
| Willie Smith | 41–30 | Sidney Smith | 2–7 November | Thurston's Hall, London |
| Joe Davis | 44–27 | Melbourne Inman | 9–14 November | Thurston's Hall, London |
| Horace Lindrum | 41–30 | Willie Smith | 9–14 November | Imperial Rooms, Glasgow |
| Sidney Smith | 36–35 | Horace Lindrum | 16–21 November | Thurston's Hall, London |
| Tom Newman | 44–27 | Melbourne Inman | 16–21 November | Manchester |
| Tom Newman | 40–31 | Willie Smith | 23–28 November | Thurston's Hall, London |
| Horace Lindrum | 41–30 | Melbourne Inman | 30 November–5 December | Thurston's Hall, London |
| Joe Davis | 38–33 | Sidney Smith | 30 November–5 December | Birmingham |
| Tom Newman | 36–35 | Sidney Smith | 7–12 December | Thurston's Hall, London |
| Joe Davis | 41–30 | Horace Lindrum | 14–19 December | Thurston's Hall, London |

Table

| Pos | Player | Pld | MW | FW |
|---|---|---|---|---|
| 1 | (England) Joe Davis | 5 | 5 | 204 |
| 2 | (Australia) Horace Lindrum | 5 | 3 | 184 |
| 3 | (England) Tom Newman | 5 | 3 | 183 |
| 4 | (England) Willie Smith | 5 | 2 | 182 |
| 5 | (England) Sidney Smith | 5 | 2 | 178 |
| 6 | (England) Melbourne Inman | 5 | 0 | 134 |

The positions were determined firstly by the number of matches won (MW) and, in the event of a tie, the number of frames won (FW).
