= Alec Brown (snooker player) =

English snooker player

Personal information
- Born: 27 May 1908 Islington, London, England
- Died: 3 September 1995 (aged 87) Plymouth, Devon, England

Sport
- Country: England
- Sport: Snooker

Alexander Edward Brown (27 May 1908 – 3 September 1995) was one of the leading professional snooker players from the mid-1930s to the mid-1950s. Brown was a former speedway driver.

He was born in London, the son of Alexander Brown, a professional billiards player. Alec Brown became a professional player aged 14.

The official rules of both snooker and billiards state that "A cue shall be not less than 3 ft (914 mm) in length and shall show no change from the traditional tapered shape and form, with a tip, used to strike the cue-ball, secured to the thinner end." This rule was introduced following an incident on 14 November 1938 when Brown was playing Tom Newman at Thurston's Hall in the 1938/1939 Daily Mail Gold Cup. In the third frame, Brown potted a red, after which the cue ball was left amidst several reds, with only a narrow way through to the black, the only colour not snookered, and which was near its spot. Playing this with conventional equipment would have been awkward. To the surprise of spectators, Brown produced a small fountain pen-sized cue from his vest pocket, chalked it, and played the stroke. Newman protested at this.

The referee, Charles Chambers, then inspected the implement, a strip of ebony about five inches long, with one end having a cue tip. Chambers decided to award a foul, and awarded Newman seven points. In response to questions, the referee quoted the rule that said all strokes must be made with the tip of the cue, so he did not regard the "fountain-pen cue" as a valid cue. Eight days later, the Billiards Association and Control Council, which owned the rules, met and decided to introduce a new rule, which has been developed into today's version: "A billiards cue, as recognised by the Billiards and Control Council, shall not be less than three feet in length, and shall show no substantial departure from the traditional and generally accepted shape and form.

Brown won the Daily Mail Gold Cup in 1938/1939 and 1939/1940. After winning the qualifying event for the 1950/1951 News of the World Tournament, and went on to win the main event.

After 33 years as a professional, he retired from snooker becaue of arthritis.

== Performance and rankings timeline ==
Tournament	1935/ 36	1936/ 37	1937/ 38	1938/ 39	1939/ 40	1945/ 46	1946/ 47	1947/ 48	1948/ 49	1949/ 50	1950/ 51	1951/ 52	1952/ 53	1953/ 54	1954/ 55
Daily Mail Gold Cup (Note: Round-robin handicap tournament) (Note: Billiards event before 1936/37 season)	NH	A	4	1	1	Tournament Not Held									
News of the World Snooker Tournament	Tournament Not Held									LQ	1	8	5	6	8
World Championship	SF	QF	QF	SF	QF	QF	QF	QF	QF	QF	A	A	Not Held		
World Professional Match-play Championship	Tournament Not Held											QF	QF	SF	SF

Performance Table Legend
LQ	lost in the qualifying draw	N	N = position in round-robin event	QF	lost in the quarter-finals
SF	lost in the semi-finals	F	lost in the final	W	won the tournament
DNQ	did not qualify for the tournament	A	did not participate in the tournament	WD	withdrew from the tournament

NH / Not Held	means an event was not held.

== Tournament wins (4) ==
No.	Event	Ref.
1.	1938/1939 Daily Mail Gold Cup	
2.	1939/1940 Daily Mail Gold Cup	
3.	1950/1951 News of the World Tournament	
4.	1950 Albany Snooker Club Tournament	
