= Sydney Lee (snooker player) =

English billiards and snooker player

- Sydney Lee with the Empire Trophy

Personal information
- Born: 25 April 1910 Streatham, London
- Died: 10 November 1986 (aged 76) Holsworthy, Devon, England

Sport
- Country: England
- Sport: Snooker
- Professional: 1934–1952, 1973–1974

Sydney Raphael Lee (25 April 1910 – 10 November 1986) was an English professional billiards and snooker player. He was four times a quarter-finalist in the World Snooker Championship during the first half of the twentieth century. He was a snooker referee on Pot Black. He was the game consultant for a 1970 episode of Steptoe and Son entitled "Pot Black" and, as well as performing a number of trick shots was the stand-in for many of the more difficult regular shots seen in the show.

== Career ==
Lee enjoyed considerable success as an amateur billiards player. He won the boys championship in May 1925 but lost to Reggie Gartland in the 1926 event. The winner of the boys championship was presented with the "Harry Lee Challenge Cup", which had been donated by his father. He was also runner-up in the English Amateur Billiards Championship in 1929 and won it 4 times in succession from 1931 to 1934. He was runner-up in the Empire Billiards Championship in Sydney in 1931 and winner when the event was next held, in London in 1933.

Lee turned professional in March 1934 after his fourth English Amateur Billiards Championship. He played competitive professional snooker in 1935, entering the 1936 World Championship. In his first match, he faced Clare O'Donnell, and having trailed 4–8, recovered to lead 15–13; however, O'Donnell won the next three frames to prevail 16–15.

His effort at the next World Championship concluded similarly, Lee losing his first match 11–20 to Horace Lindrum, and the same followed in 1938, when he lost 7–24 to Joe Davis.

Having lost to Sydney Smith in the 1939 World Championship, Lee played in the 1939/1940 Daily Mail Gold Cup; there, he defeated Smith, Walter Donaldson, Alec Brown and Tom Newman, but lost to both Joe Davis and Fred Davis. Brown finished top of the group, winning the competition. At that year's World Championship, Lee lost 11–20 again, this time to Fred Davis.

Upon the resumption of that tournament in 1946, Lee had no more luck than in his previous attempts, losing his first match 12–19 to Stanley Newman. However, he did enjoy a victory in the 1947 edition, beating Jim Lees 19–16, before losing 10–25 in the second round to Willie Leigh.

Lee progressed to the third round of the 1950 World Championship, defeating Canadian Con Stanbury and Herbert Holt, but lost at that stage, 14–21 to Kingsley Kennerley.

Lee entered the 1974 World Championship and was seeded to the first round. There, he met John Pulman, but scored only 210 points as the latter whitewashed him 8–0.
