= Joe Davis =

English snooker and billiards player (1901–1978)

Joe Davis OBE
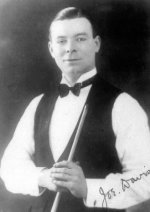
- Davis c. 1920

Personal information
- Nicknames: The Sultan of Snooker; The Emperor of Pot
- Born: 15 April 1901 Whitwell, Derbyshire, England
- Died: 10 July 1978 (aged 77) Hampshire, England

Sport
- Country: England
- Sport: Snooker
- Professional: 1919–1964

Tournament wins
- World Championship: Snooker: 1927; 1928; 1929; 1930; 1931; 1932; 1933; 1934; 1935; 1936; 1937; 1938; 1939; 1940; 1946; (15 times); English billiards: 1928, 1929, 1930, 1932; (4 times)

Joseph Davis (15 April 1901 – 10 July 1978) was an English professional snooker and billiards player. He was the dominant figure in snooker from the 1920s to the 1950s, and has been credited with inventing aspects of the way the game is now played, such as break-building. He drove the creation of the World Snooker Championship by persuading the Billiards Association and Control Council to recognise an official professional snooker championship in 1927. Davis won the first 15 world championships from 1927 to 1946, and he is the only undefeated player in World Snooker Championship history. In 1935, he scored the championship's first century break.

A professional English billiards player from the age of 18, Davis was World Billiards Champion four times between 1928 and 1932. He was the first person to win world championship titles in both billiards and snooker. After his 1946 victory, Davis no longer played in the World Snooker Championship but he participated in other tournaments and exhibition matches until 1964, winning four News of the World Snooker Tournament titles. He also continued to wield considerable influence over the professional game through his chairmanship of the professional players' association, his co-ownership of the Leicester Square Hall venue, and his negotiation of television contracts. His younger brother, Fred Davis, was the only person to defeat him in a competitive snooker match without receiving a start.

In 1955, Davis was the first player to make an officially recognised maximum break. He collapsed whilst watching his brother Fred play Perrie Mans in the semi-final of the 1978 World Snooker Championship. During his convalescence, Davis contracted a chest infection which led to his death on 10 July that year.

== Early life ==
Joseph Davis was born in Whitwell, Derbyshire, on 15 April 1901, the son of Fred Davis and Ann Eliza Davis, née Clark. His younger brother, Fred, the youngest of the family's six children, would also grow up to become a professional snooker player. His father was a miner when Joe was born, and had become a publican by the time Joe was two years old, managing the Travellers Rest pub at Whittington Moor. Davis was sent to live with his grandparents in Newbold for several years. By the time he moved back to live with his parents, his father was the landlord of the Queen's Hotel, which had a full-size billiard table. Davis started playing English billiards at the age of eleven. From the age of twelve, he took lessons from Ernest Rudge, a billiards player turned entrepreneur, who lived in Chesterfield and had recently opened a billiard hall in the town. The lessons took place at Rudge's private billiard room at the end of his garden. Davis would later manage billiard halls owned either by his family or by Rudge. He scored his first century break in billiards at age twelve in an exhibition game against J. D. Dickens.

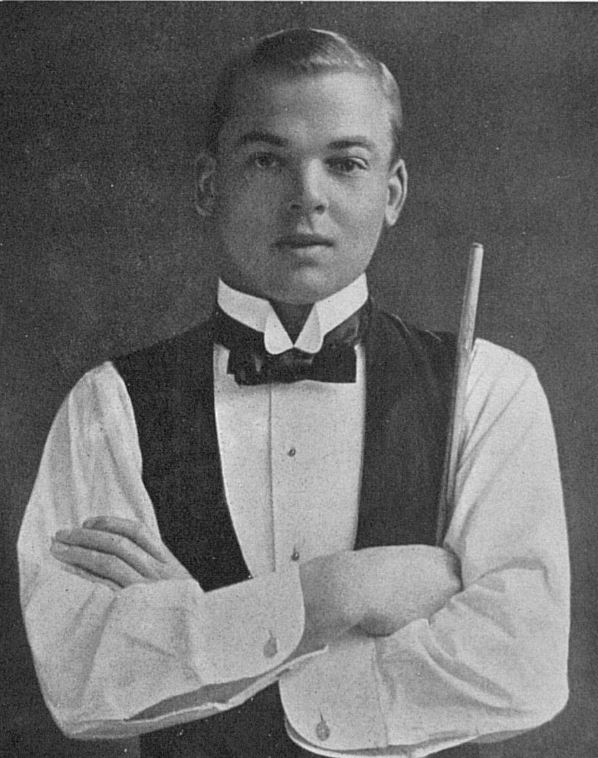
Claude Falkiner c. 1915

Rudge arranged professional matches at his billiards hall in Chesterfield. In December 1913, he hosted a week-long match between the Australian billiards player George Gray, and Claude Falkiner from Featherstone in West Yorkshire. Davis acted as the spot boy for this match, giving him the chance to closely observe the technique of the two professional players. At one point during the week, Rudge asked Gray to give his opinion of Davis. Gray played with a stance that involved sighting with both eyes centrally over the cue, and with the cue running down the middle of his chin. Davis could not focus with his right eye so he played using a stance in which he rested the cue slightly to the left side of his chin, allowing him to sight along the cue with just his left eye. According to Davis, Gray said of him: "the boy will never be a good player until he alters his sighting." Davis was despondent following Gray's assessment of him. Rudge tried to change Davis's technique and stance to make him play "two-eyed" but, since Davis could not play this way naturally, they decided not to persist in trying to alter this aspect of his style.

At the age of 13, Davis beat Dickens to win the Chesterfield and District Amateur Billiards Championship. The final score over three evenings was 1,500–1,229 to Davis, who received a trophy, a gold medal and a set of billiard balls for making a break of 115, the highest of the tournament. In February 1915, Rudge organised a match between Tom Reece and Willie Smith at Chesterfield. Reece played a practice game against Davis on the afternoon of 11 February, because Smith had a business engagement elsewhere. Davis, who was given a handicap start of 650 points, defeated Reece 1,000–785. At the opening of the Victoria Billiard Hall in Hasland the same year, Davis played the ex-Yorkshire champion F. W. Hughes of Leeds in an exhibition match. Davis received a handicap start of 200 points, and defeated Hughes 600–370, concluding with an unfinished break of 99. In an exhibition match at Chesterfield against Falkiner on 14 September 1916, he lost 232–400, after being given a 150-point head start.

== Professional billiards career ==
=== 1919–1927 ===
Davis became a professional billiards player in 1919 at the age of 18. His first professional match was in February 1920 at Brampton Coliseum, just outside Chesterfield, against Albert Raynor of Sheffield. It was a week-long match of the first to 8,000 points. Raynor conceded 1,000 points to Davis from the start. The match finished on 14 February, and resulted in a victory for Davis by 145 points. His highest break of the match was 160. By the end of March 1920, Davis's highest recorded break in billiards was 468. He defeated the Midlands champion, Fred Lawrence, at Chesterfield on 27 March 1920 in a week-long match of the first to 8,000 points. Having received a start of 1,000 points, Davis won by 8,000–7,494, and made 23 breaks over 100, the highest of which was 262. On 29 November 1920, he began a week-long match of the first to 8,000 points, against Arthur F. Peall at the Victoria Billiard Hall in Chesterfield. Davis received a start of 1,000 points, but lost 7,785–8,000.

In March 1921, he lost 302–400 to Lawrence in the semi-final of an invitational professional tournament at Thurston's Hall held in aid of the St. Dunstan's aftercare fund. He had eliminated Scottish champion Tom Aiken in his previous match. He also lost to Lawrence in the final of his first open professional championship, the 1921 Midlands Counties Billiards Championship. Lawrence won by 866 in the first-to-7,000-points contest. At Manchester in April, Davis lost 13,208–15,000 against the northern billiards champion, Tom Tothill, despite making a break of 495.

He faced the Welsh champion, Tom Carpenter, in a match to 7,000 points at Cardiff in January 1922, winning by just one point. He won the 1922 Midlands Counties Billiards Championship, defeating Tom Dennis 6,417–4,433 in the week-long final in February. Later that year, a victory in the Second Division Billiards Championship, which included a win in the final over Peall in March, gave Davis an entry into the Billiards Association and Control Council (BA&CC) Professional Championship. According to The Birmingham Daily Gazette report, he was "outclassed" by Tom Newman in their championship match, which concluded on 15 April 1922, losing 5,181–8,000.

Davis failed to qualify for the 1923 professional championship, losing to Lawrence in the Second Division semi-final at Chesterfield in February. On 11 October 1923, he made the highest break of his career to that point, 599, against Lawrence at the Burroughes Hall in Piccadilly. The final score was 14,000–10,743 to Davis. He became Midlands champion for the second time in 1924, defeating Lawrence 14,000–12,263 in the final. On 28 February 1924, he made a break of 980 in the Second Division Championship at Cardiff, during a 14,000–10,240 semi-final victory over Carpenter. Davis won the championship that year, easily overcoming Lawrence in the final; his winning margin was 6,198 points with the final score 14,000–7,802. Lawrence was out of condition during this game, following a serious illness from some time before, and the result was never in doubt from the early stages.

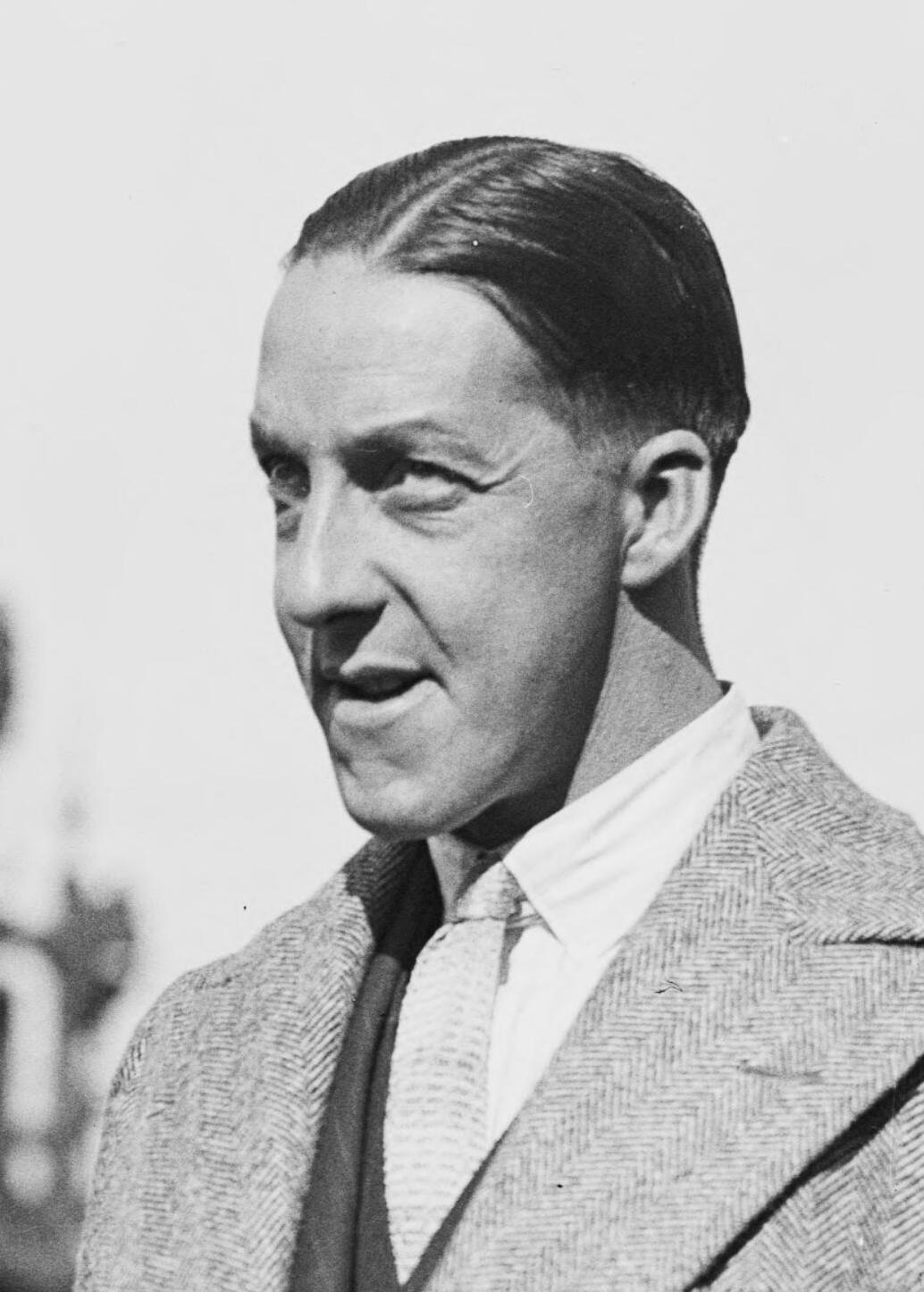
Tom Newman (pictured in 1930) played Davis for the professional (World English Billiards) Championship each year from 1926 to 1930.

In 1926, Davis and defending champion Newman were the only two players to enter the professional billiards championship, (Note: The only two entrants in the previous year's championship were Tom Reece and Tom Newman.) which is now regarded as the world championship. Newman defeated Davis 16,000–9,505. He reached the final the next year and was again defeated by Newman. In a match of the first to 16,000 points, Newman's winning margin was 1,237. Davis achieved his highest break ever in billiards of 2,501 on 27 April 1927 in this final. He used the pendulum stroke, which had recently been introduced by Reece, during this break. The technique involves scoring long runs of close direct cannons by tapping the cue ball lightly across them. There were calls for this stroke to be limited or abolished because it was so tedious to watch. On 9 August 1927, the Billiards Association Control Council decided to alter the rules to eliminate the big breaks made from ball-to-ball cannons alone. The number of consecutive direct cannons allowed during a break was limited to 35, and the pendulum stroke was defined as being in the category of the direct cannon.

Davis made a break of 1,011 on 20 October 1927 in a match against Newman at Thurston's. It was the first 1,000 break made under the new rules. Davis won by 485 points in this match of the first to 16,000, after being given a 2,000 start.

=== 1928–1934 ===
He defeated Newman in 1928 to become the world champion at English billiards for the first time, making sixty centuries in the last final to be played with ivory balls. It took place at Thurston's and the final score was 16,000–14,874. Davis thereby became the first player to hold the professional titles in both billiards and snooker, an achievement not matched until his brother Fred Davis won the billiards championship in 1980. Davis successfully defended his title for the next three years. In the 1929 final against Newman, Davis made 63 century breaks and his average score per visit to the table was 100. The final ended on 20 April 1929, with the score 18,000–17,219 to Davis.

In 1930, he set a new record average score-per-visit of 113.3. Davis again won against Newman, 20,918–20,117, in the 1930 billiards final. On 7 May 1930 in this final Davis completed a break of 2,052. At that time this was a record for the championship under the existing rules, and the highest billiard break he ever made after the rule change in 1927. The event was not held in 1931 as most of the leading professionals did not enter, mainly due to a disagreement with the BA&CC over the cloth to be used. The only entrant was Smith, who was not declared champion.

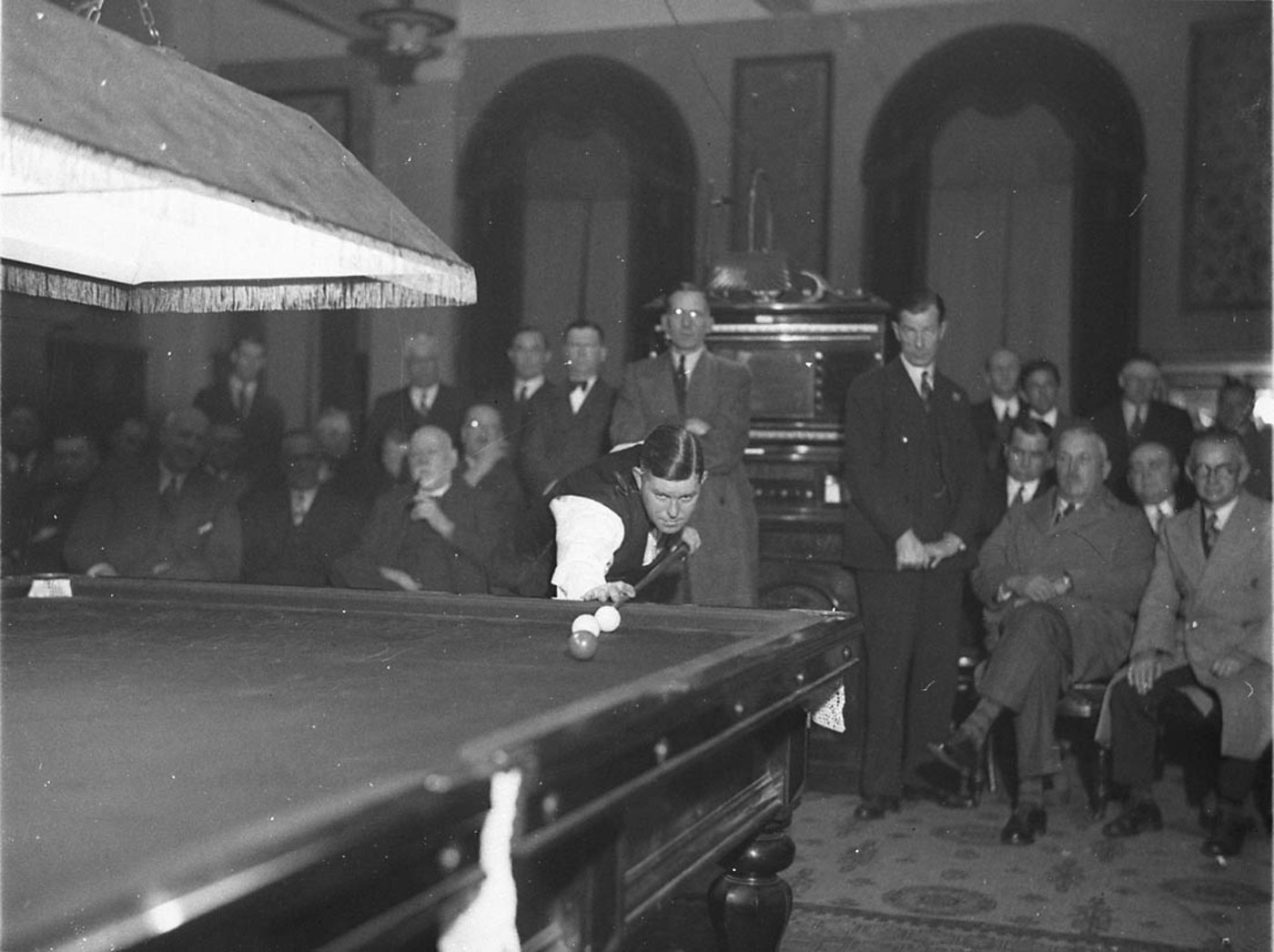
Walter Lindrum (pictured in 1934, playing a shot) defeated Davis twice for the World English Billiards Championship.

Davis played Walter Lindrum in a fortnight's match under time limit conditions at Thurston's, which began on 18 January 1932. Davis was given a start of 7,000. The second afternoon session ended with Lindrum on an unfinished break of 3,151 points. The next day, Lindrum narrowly missed a difficult cushion cannon with the rest and the break ended at 4,137. This surpassed Lindrum's previous record of 3,905. Davis responded finishing the afternoon session on 1,131 unfinished. His break continued in the evening session and finished on 1,247. He considered this break, in many respects, to have been his finest. This was the first time that opponents in a billiards game had made four-figure breaks in consecutive visits to the table. In 1932, Davis faced New Zealander Clark McConachy in the final. McConachy had won three of their four warm-up matches but in the championship itself, Davis won 25,161–19,259, scoring over 11,000 of his points through a series of runs of "close cannons", in which the three balls are kept close together for consecutive cannons. Davis reached the final again in 1933 and 1934, losing on both occasions to Lindrum.

The UK Professional English Billiards Championship was first contested in 1934, and for several years after that was regarded as the premier event of the billiards season in the UK, in the absence of any contests for the world championships. Davis won the inaugural UK title with an 18,745–18,309 defeat of Newman. After Lindrum had won the World Championship in 1933, he had insisted that the competition should be held in Australia for his defence. The Billiards Association and Control Council agreed to this, and Davis travelled to Australia for the 1934 Championship, where he was disappointed by the lack of planning for the tournament, and found it hard to raise the money for his return to the UK. Lindrum retained the world championship in 1934, and it was not contested again until 1952. Davis defeated Newman in each annual UK championship final up to 1939. The tournament was not held from 1940 to 1945, during World War II. Davis also took the first post-war UK title, with a walkover over John Barrie.

== Professional snooker career ==
Coinciding with Davis's peak as a billiards player, public interest in billiards was waning because the top players were becoming so proficient that the game was considered boring for spectators. By 1924, breaks of over 1,000 were becoming increasingly common, and amendments to the rules were under consideration to make high breaks more difficult. In February 1925, Davis played Newman in a game of snooker, and made a break of 96, which was a new record for a professional match, exceeding the existing record of 89 set by Newman in 1919. As a billiard hall manager, Davis noticed the increasing popularity of snooker and with the help of Birmingham-based billiards equipment manager Bill Camkin, he persuaded the BA&CC to recognise an official professional snooker championship in the 1926–27 season. The final of the first snooker world championship was held at Camkin's Hall in 1927; Davis won the tournament by defeating Dennis 16–7, (Note: The final score was 20–11 after dead frames were completed to take the total to the agreed 31 frames.) and took the winner's prize of £6 10s.

Davis won the World Championship every year until 1940, and again in 1946 when it was next held after being interrupted by the war. He compiled his first snooker century break against Fred Pugh in January 1928, and made the first official century break of the World Snooker Championship, in 1930. As defending champion in 1928, Davis was seeded into the final to face the winner of a knockout competition between the other entrants. Lawrence qualified for the final, which Davis won 16–13. In 1929, the final was held in the back room of a pub owned by the losing finalist, Dennis, who then became runner-up for the third time in four years when Davis defeated him 25–12 in the 1930 final. In both 1931 and 1934, the tournament was contested by only Davis and one other player. The losing finalist in 1932 was McConachy, the first player from outside the British Isles to enter the World Snooker Championship, and Smith was the runner-up to Davis in 1933.

In 1934, Davis travelled to Australia to play Horace Lindrum in an invitational match, the World Snooker Challenge. Davis won by 46 frames to 29. From 1935, the World Championship became more remunerative for players, after public interest increased when Davis set a new championship record break of 110 against Newman in their semi-final. Smith was the runner-up that year. Davis won against Lindrum in the 1936 and 1937 finals. Lindrum declined to enter the 1938 tournament, and it was Sidney Smith who finished second to Davis in both that year and 1939. The 1940 final was contested between the Davis brothers; Joe took an early lead but Fred won 11 frames in a row to take a 20–14 lead. Joe eventually won the match 37–35, with Fred winning the dead frame to take the score to 37–36.

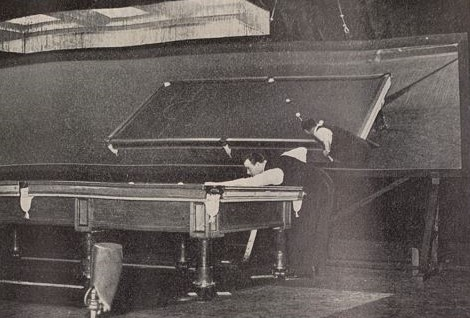
Davis playing in an exhibition match (with angled mirror behind), c. 1940

Due to World War II, the World Championship was not held again until 1946. During the war, Davis toured the United Kingdom playing exhibition matches to raise money for charities. At some exhibitions, including those at the London Palladium, a large angled mirror was positioned next to the table to allow the audience a clear view of the playing surface. Davis successfully defended his title in 1946, his 15th consecutive win, and thereby held the title for 20 consecutive years. As of 2022, he has won more world championships than any other player. Davis retired from the event following this victory, having won the title at all 15 events from 1927 to 1946, making him, as of 2022, the only undefeated player in the history of the World Championship. Davis remained the best player until his retirement in 1964; his brother Fred came closest to Joe's standard during this time. According to snooker historian Clive Everton, Davis's retirement from the World Championship reduced its prestige. Snooker journalists and authors Hector Nunns and David Hendon share this opinion.

With the exception of the World Championship, snooker tournaments were contested on a handicap basis where, using pre-determined numerical handicaps, one player would concede a set number of points to his opponent at the beginning of each frame, for example allowing his opponent to start with 14 points rather than zero. Despite offering a handicap to the other players, Davis won the News of the World Tournament on three occasions during the 1950s; his brother Fred and future world champion John Pulman each won it twice. In 1959, Davis attempted to popularise a new version of the game called snooker plus, which had two extra colours, an orange and a purple. The 1959 News of the World Snooker Plus Tournament was contested using this variant. According to Everton, "the public rejected the game for the gimmick it was."

Davis scored the first officially recognised maximum break of 147 on 22 January 1955 at Leicester Square Hall in an exhibition match against Smith. The BA&CC initially refused to recognise the break because it was not made under their version of the rules; the match had taken place under the rules used by professionals that included the "play again" rule under which the opponent can require a player who has made a foul shot to play the next shot as well. The Association eventually recognised the break in April 1957, shortly before the "play again" rule was incorporated into the rules for amateur players.

Davis was awarded the Order of the British Empire (OBE) in 1963. He continued to play professionally until 1964. Davis died on 10 July 1978, two months after falling ill while watching his brother Fred play Perrie Mans in the 1978 World Snooker Championship semi-final. The day after the match, he collapsed in the street and required a lengthy surgical procedure. He died from a chest infection that he contracted during his recuperation. The house in Whitwell where he was born bears a plaque commemorating him.

== Legacy ==
Over a 20-year period, Davis won four World Billiards Championship titles and 15 World Snooker Championship titles. Other than in handicapped matches in which he conceded a start, he lost only four times, all towards the end of his career and against his brother Fred. Everton has said of Davis's influence on the game in the early 1920s: "in those days, the prevailing idea was to pot a red or two, a couple of colours and play safe but in the time he could spare from billiards Davis devoted considerable thought and practice to evolving the positional and breakbuilding shots, sequences and techniques which are taken for granted today." Fred Davis, the second person to become a world champion at both snooker and billiards, said that his brother Joe was "a very good player before anyone else knew how to play the game." Ted Lowe, manager of Leicester Square Hall and later a snooker commentator for the BBC, wrote that "because of his magnetism, snooker was able to replace billiards in most clubs, pubs and billiard halls." Journalist Donald Trelford provided a similar assessment in his book Snookered (1986), writing that Davis had the vision to identify snooker as a replacement for billiards and "had the organizing genius and force of habit to make things happen in that moribund world."

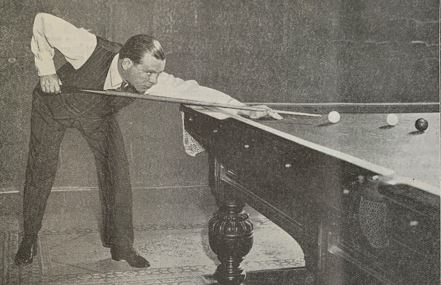
Joe Davis c. 1938

Davis was not able to focus with his right eye; he played with his cue to the left of his chin. Renowned Coach Frank Callan, in his book Frank Callan's Snooker Clinic (1989), compared the most successful player at the time, Steve Davis, to Joe Davis. Callan played in exhibition matches against Joe Davis and in later life coached Steve Davis, amongst others, with their technique. So his opinion is relevant when comparing Joe Davis to later top players. After discussing the differences between the two eras, Callan said "... if we could put Joe in the same environment as Steve after he won his first World title, I simply cannot believe that he would have had a better record." He then concludes with; "So if you twist my arm, I would have to put my money on Steve. But having said that, Joe would still have been among the top players of today." While learning to play snooker, Steve Davis was heavily influenced by Joe Davis's book How I Play Snooker (1956). Ronnie O'Sullivan said of one of Davis's coaching books: "2007–8 ... was one of my best years and it was all because I was reading the Joe Davis book." O'Sullivan again paid tribute to Davis after claiming his sixth world title in 2020. Everton wrote that, following his retirement from the world championship, Davis "through his force of personality ... controlled the game", being the pre-eminent player, chairman of the professional players' association, a co-owner of the Leicester Square Hall (the main venue for professional matches), and the negotiator for television contracts. Davis was nicknamed "Mr Snooker", "the Sultan of Snooker" and "the Emperor of Pot".

== Personal life ==
Davis married Florence Enid Stevenson (born 1899) on 8 June 1921, and they had two children together. This first marriage was dissolved in 1931. On 6 April 1945, he married Juanita Ida Triggs (born 1910), a singer who performed under the stage name June Malo. June died on 23 July 2008.

== Snooker performance timeline ==
| Tournament | 1926/ 27 | 1927/ 28 | 1928/ 29 | 1929/ 30 | 1930/ 31 | 1931/ 32 | 1932/ 33 | 1933/ 34 | 1934/ 35 | 1935/ 36 | 1936/ 37 | 1937/ 38 | 1938/ 39 | 1939/ 40 | Ref. |
|---|---|---|---|---|---|---|---|---|---|---|---|---|---|---|---|
| Daily Mail Gold Cup (Note: Round-robin handicap tournament.) (Note: Billiards event before 1936/37 season.) | Tournament Not Held | | | | | | | | | | 1 | 1 | 4 | 6 | |
| World Championship | W | W | W | W | W | W | W | W | W | W | W | W | W | W | |

| Tournament | 1945/ 46 | 1946/ 47 | 1947/ 48 | 1948/ 49 | 1949/ 50 | 1950/ 51 | 1951/ 52 | 1952/ 53 | 1953/ 54 | 1954/ 55 | 1955/ 56 | 1956/ 57 | 1957/ 58 | 1958/ 59 | 1959/ 60 | Ref. |
|---|---|---|---|---|---|---|---|---|---|---|---|---|---|---|---|---|
| Sunday Empire News Tournament (Note: Round-robin handicap tournament.) | Tournament Not Held | | | 1 | Tournament Not Held | | | | | | | | | | | |
| News of the World Snooker Tournament (Note: Round-robin handicap tournament.) (Note: Snooker Plus event in 1959/60 season) | Tournament Not Held | | | | 1 | 3 | 7 | 1 | 2 | 2 | 1 | 5 | 5 | 2 | 1 | |
| Sporting Record Masters' Tournament (Note: Round-robin handicap tournament.) | Tournament Not Held | | | | 1 | Tournament Not Held | | | | | | | | | | |
| World Championship | W | A | A | A | A | A | A | Tournament Not Held | | | | | | | | |

Performance Table Legend
| W | won the tournament | N | N = position in round-robin event | A | did not participate in the tournament |

== Career finals ==
=== Snooker: (30 titles) ===
World Snooker Championship finals (15 titles)
| Outcome | No. | Year | Championship | Opponent in the final | Score |
|---|---|---|---|---|---|
| Winner | 1 | 1927 | World Snooker Championship | Tom Dennis (ENG) | 20–11 |
| Winner | 2 | 1928 | World Snooker Championship | Fred Lawrence (ENG) | 16–13 |
| Winner | 3 | 1929 | World Snooker Championship | Tom Dennis (ENG) | 19–14 |
| Winner | 4 | 1930 | World Snooker Championship | Tom Dennis (ENG) | 25–12 |
| Winner | 5 | 1931 | World Snooker Championship | Tom Dennis (ENG) | 25–21 |
| Winner | 6 | 1932 | World Snooker Championship | Clark McConachy (NZL) | 30–19 |
| Winner | 7 | 1933 | World Snooker Championship | Willie Smith (ENG) | 25–18 |
| Winner | 8 | 1934 | World Snooker Championship | Tom Newman (ENG) | 25–22 |
| Winner | 9 | 1935 | World Snooker Championship | Willie Smith (ENG) | 25–20 |
| Winner | 10 | 1936 | World Snooker Championship | Horace Lindrum (AUS) | 34–27 |
| Winner | 11 | 1937 | World Snooker Championship | Horace Lindrum (AUS) | 32–29 |
| Winner | 12 | 1938 | World Snooker Championship | Sidney Smith (ENG) | 37–24 |
| Winner | 13 | 1939 | World Snooker Championship | Sidney Smith (ENG) | 43–30 |
| Winner | 14 | 1940 | World Snooker Championship | Fred Davis (ENG) | 37–36 |
| Winner | 15 | 1946 | World Snooker Championship | Horace Lindrum (AUS) | 78–67 |

Other snooker tournament wins: (15 titles)
| Outcome | Year | Championship | Runner-up | Score | Ref. |
|---|---|---|---|---|---|
| Winner | 1934 | World Snooker Challenge | Horace Lindrum (AUS) | 46–29 | |
| Winner | 1935 | Thurston Snooker Challenge | Horace Lindrum (AUS) | 32–29 | |
| Winner | 1936 | Daily Mail Gold Cup | Horace Lindrum (AUS) | Round-robin | |
| Winner | 1937 | Coventry Challenge | Horace Lindrum (AUS) | 39–32 | |
| Winner | 1938 | Scottish Challenge | Horace Lindrum (AUS) | 39–32 | |
| Winner | 1938 | Daily Mail Gold Cup | Willie Smith (ENG) | Round-robin | |
| Winner | 1938 | Northeast Challenge | Horace Lindrum (AUS) | 37–34 | |
| Winner | 1938 | Thurston Challenge | Horace Lindrum (AUS) | 71–62 | |
| Winner | 1939 | Thurston Challenge | Horace Lindrum (AUS) | 39–34 | |
| Winner | 1948 | Sunday Empire News Tournament | John Pulman (ENG) | Round-robin | |
| Winner | 1950 | News of the World Snooker Tournament | Sidney Smith (ENG) | Round-robin | |
| Winner | 1950 | Sporting Record Masters' Tournament | Sidney Smith (ENG) | Round-robin | |
| Winner | 1953 | News of the World Snooker Tournament | Jackie Rea (NIR) | Round-robin | |
| Winner | 1956 | News of the World Snooker Tournament | Fred Davis (ENG) | Round-robin | |
| Winner | 1959 | News of the World Snooker Tournament | Fred Davis (ENG) | Round-robin | |

=== English Billiards ===
World Billiards Championship finals
| Outcome | No. | Date | Championship | Opponent in the final | Score |
|---|---|---|---|---|---|
| Runner-up | 1 | May 1926 | Billiards Association and Control Club Championship | Tom Newman (ENG) | 9,505–16,000 |
| Runner-up | 2 | May 1927 | Billiards Association and Control Club Championship | Tom Newman (ENG) | 14,763–16,000 |
| Winner | 1 | May 1928 | Billiards Association and Control Club Championship | Tom Newman (ENG) | 16,000–14,874 |
| Winner | 2 | April 1929 | Billiards Association and Control Club Championship | Tom Newman (ENG) | 18,000–17,219 |
| Winner | 3 | May 1930 | Billiards Association and Control Club Championship | Tom Newman (ENG) | 20,918–20,117 |
| Winner | 4 | March 1932 | Billiards Association and Control Club Championship | Clark McConachy (NZL) | 25,161–19,259 |
| Runner-up | 3 | May 1933 | World Professional Championship of English Billiards | Walter Lindrum (AUS) | 21,121–21,815 |
| Runner-up | 4 | October 1934 | World Professional Championship of English Billiards | Walter Lindrum (AUS) | 22,678–23,553 |

United Kingdom Professional Billiards Championship finals (Note: The UK championship was instituted in 1934. It was not held from 1940 to 1946.)
| Outcome | No. | Date | Championship | Opponent in the final | Score |
|---|---|---|---|---|---|
| Winner | 1 | 1934 | United Kingdom Championship | Tom Newman (ENG) | 18,745–18,309 |
| Winner | 2 | 1935 | United Kingdom Championship | Tom Newman (ENG) | 21,733–19,910 |
| Winner | 3 | 1936 | United Kingdom Championship | Tom Newman (ENG) | 21,710–19,791 |
| Winner | 4 | 1937 | United Kingdom Championship | Tom Newman (ENG) | 22,601–18,321 |
| Winner | 5 | 1938 | United Kingdom Championship | Tom Newman (ENG) | 20,933–19,542 |
| Winner | 6 | 1939 | United Kingdom Championship | Tom Newman (ENG) | 21,601–18,383 |
| Winner | 7 | 1947 | United Kingdom Championship | John Barrie (ENG) | walkover |

== Publications ==
- Davis, Joe (1929). Billiards Up-To-Date. London: John Long.
- Davis, Joe (1930). My Snooker Book. London: John Long.
- Davis, Joe (1932). How to Pot a Ball. London: Wright & Brown.
- Davis, Joe (1936). Improve Your Snooker. London: Methuen Publishing.
- Davis, Joe (1954). Advanced Snooker. Country Life.
- Davis, Joe (1956). How I Play Snooker. Country Life.
- Davis, Joe (1967). Complete Snooker for the Amateur. Country Life. (Note: Compilation of How I Play Snooker, Advanced Snooker, and 16 new pages headed Shots you must Know. A revised edition was published in 1969.)
- Davis, Joe (1974). Complete Snooker. W. H. Allen. ISBN 978-0-491-01521-9. (Note: The revised 1969 edition of Complete Snooker for the Amateur, with a new introduction by Eddie Charlton.)
- Davis, Joe (1976). The Breaks Came My Way. London: W. H. Allen. ISBN 0491016867.
