= Tom Newman (billiards player) =

English snooker and billiard player (1894–1943)

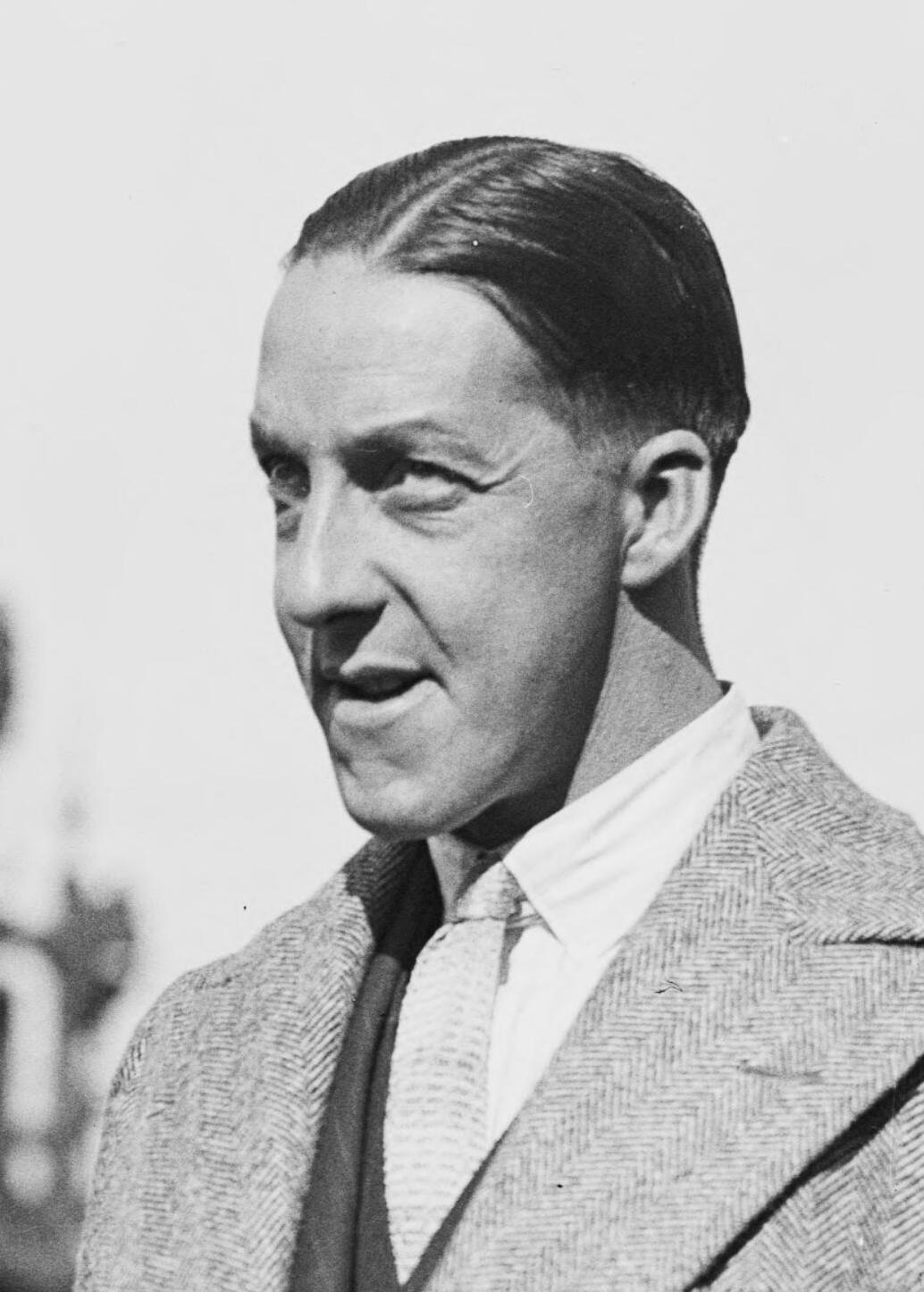

Personal information
- Born: 23 March 1894 Barton-upon-Humber, Lincolnshire, England
- Died: 30 September 1943 (aged 49) Tufnel Park, London

Sport
- Country: England
- Sport: Snooker
- Professional: 1921–1943

Tom Newman (23 March 1894 – 30 September 1943) was an English professional player of English billiards and snooker. He was born Thomas Edgar Pratt in Barton-upon-Humber, Lincolnshire. He always appeared under the name Tom Newman when playing billiards or snooker and changed his name formally in 1919, shortly before his marriage that year.

He established himself as the best billiards players of the 1920s, appearing in every World Professional Billiards Championship final between 1921 and 1930, and winning the title six times. In the last five of these finals he met Joe Davis, winning twice (1926 & 1927) and losing three times (1928, 1929 & 1930).

Newman was a great break builder at billiards, and was a master of the cannon shot. His first century break at the "three ball game" came when he was 11 years of age; and in the 1930–31 season he made 30 breaks of 1000. During this season, on 5 March 1931, he made his personal highest break of 1,827 in a match against Walter Lindrum at the Foresters' Hall, Dundee.

Like many players of that era he regarded snooker as the less "serious" of the two sports, but nevertheless he made an officially recognized record snooker break of 89 in 1919. In 1934 he was one of two entries for the World Championship, the other being defending champion Joe Davis. Davis won 25–22, although at one stage Newman led 14–13.

He was the proprietor of Newman's Club, opened in 1924 and primarily a billiard hall. It was located at 3 Circus Road, St John's Wood, London.

Newman died at his home in Tufnel Park, London, on 30 September 1943, aged 49. He had had throat trouble for several years. He was buried at the City of London Cemetery, Ilford, his playing cue being placed in the coffin with him.

== Tournament wins ==
- World Professional Billiards Championship: 1921, 1922, 1924, 1925, 1926, 1927
- Daily Mail Gold Cup: 1935

== Snooker performance and rankings timeline ==
Tournament	1926/ 27	1927/ 28	1928/ 29	1929/ 30	1930/ 31	1931/ 32	1932/ 33	1933/ 34	1934/ 35	1935/ 36	1936/ 37	1937/ 38	1938/ 39	1939/ 40
Daily Mail Gold Cup (Note: Round-robin handicap tournament) (Note: Billiards event before 1936/37 season)	Tournament Not Held										3	6	3	5
World Championship	1R	SF	A	QF	A	A	A	F	SF	1R	QF	QF	QF	QF

Performance Table Legend
LQ	lost in the qualifying draw	#R/N	lost in the early rounds of the tournament (N = position in round-robin event)	QF	lost in the quarter-finals
SF	lost in the semi-finals (challenge final in 1928)	F	lost in the final	W	won the tournament
DNQ	did not qualify for the tournament	A	did not participate in the tournament	WD	withdrew from the tournament

NH / Not Held	means an event was not held.

== Snooker finals ==
=== Non-ranking event finals: 1 ===
Outcome	Year	Championship	Opponent in the final	Score
Runner-up	1934	World Snooker Championship	(England) Joe Davis	22–25
