= List of snooker players by number of ranking titles =

This is a list of professional snooker players ordered by the number of "ranking titles" they have won. A ranking title is a tournament that counts towards the snooker world rankings. World rankings were introduced in the 1976–77 season, initially based on the results from the previous three World Championships. This meant that the 1974 World Championship retrospectively became the first ranking event, won by Ray Reardon.

Until 1982, the World Championship was the only ranking event. In the 1982–83 season, two more ranking events were added to the snooker calendar: the International Open and the Professional Players Tournament. In 1984, the UK Championship, initially a non-ranking tournament, became a ranking event for the first time. More ranking tournaments were established over the years. In the 2018–19 season, there were twenty events worth ranking points.

== List of winners ==
Following the 2026 International Championship

Ronnie O'Sullivan holds the record for the most ranking titles, with 41. He surpassed Stephen Hendry's previous record of 36 by winning the 2020 World Snooker Championship.

Name	Titles	First	Latest

Ronnie O'Sullivan (ENG) (Note: Ronnie O'Sullivan won five Shanghai Masters tournaments but three were non-ranking.)	41	1993	2024
World Championship	7		
UK Championship	8		
World Open	1		
Welsh Open	4		
China Open	2		
Shanghai Masters	2		
Northern Ireland Trophy	1		
British Open	1		
Dubai Classic	1		
German Masters	2		
Irish Masters	2		
World Grand Prix	3		
European Masters	1		
English Open	1		
Scottish Open	2		
Players Championship	2		
Tour Championship	1		

Stephen Hendry (SCO)	36	1987	2005
World Championship	7		
UK Championship	5		
World Open	4		
Welsh Open	3		
British Open	4		
Dubai Classic	3		
European Masters	4		
Scottish Open	3		
Thailand Masters	3		

John Higgins (SCO) (Note: John Higgins won the China Championship in 2016 but this was not a ranking win.)	33	1994	2025
World Championship	4		
UK Championship	3		
World Open	5		
Welsh Open	5		
China Open	1		
Shanghai Masters	1		
International Championship	1		
Indian Open	1		
British Open	4		
German Masters	2		
Australian Goldfields Open	1		
European Masters	1		
Scottish Open	2		
Players Championship	1		
Tour Championship	1		

Judd Trump (ENG) (Note: Judd Trump won three World Grand Prix tournaments but one was non-ranking.)	31	2011	2026
World Championship	1		
UK Championship	2		
World Open	2		
China Open	2		
International Championship	2		
German Masters	4		
Australian Goldfields Open	1		
World Grand Prix	2		
European Masters	2		
English Open	2		
Northern Ireland Open	4		
Gibraltar Open	2		
Players Championship	2		
Turkish Masters	1		
Wuhan Open	1		
Saudi Arabia Masters	1		

Steve Davis (ENG) (Note: Steve Davis won six UK Championships but two were non-ranking. He also won the China Open tournament in 1997 but this was not a ranking win.)	28	1981	1995
World Championship	6		
UK Championship	4		
World Open	3		
Welsh Open	2		
British Open	2		
Classic	4		
European Masters	1		
Scottish Open	5		
Thailand Masters	1		

Mark Williams (WAL)	27	1996	2025
World Championship	3		
UK Championship	2		
World Open	4		
Welsh Open	2		
China Open	3		
British Open	3		
German Masters	2		
European Masters	1		
Northern Ireland Open	1		
Thailand Masters	3		
Tour Championship	1		
WST Pro Series	1		
Xi'an Grand Prix	1		

Neil Robertson (AUS)	26	2006	2025
World Championship	1		
UK Championship	3		
World Open	3		
Welsh Open	2		
China Open	2		
Wuxi Classic	2		
Bahrain Championship	1		
World Grand Prix	2		
Riga Masters	2		
European Masters	1		
English Open	2		
Scottish Open	1		
Players Championship	1		
Tour Championship	2		
Saudi Arabia Masters	1		

Mark Selby (ENG) (Note: Mark Selby won three Paul Hunter Classic tournaments but two were non-ranking.)	26	2008	2026
World Championship	4		
UK Championship	3		
Welsh Open	2		
China Open	4		
Shanghai Masters	1		
International Championship	2		
British Open	1		
German Masters	1		
Paul Hunter Classic	1		
European Masters	1		
English Open	2		
Scottish Open	2		
China Championship	1		
WST Classic	1		

Ding Junhui (CHN)	15	2005	2024
UK Championship	3		
World Open	1		
Welsh Open	1		
China Open	2		
Shanghai Masters	2		
International Championship	2		
Indian Open	1		
Northern Ireland Trophy	1		
German Masters	1		
Players Championship	1		

Shaun Murphy (ENG) (Note: Shaun Murphy won two European Masters tournaments but one was non-ranking.)	13	2005	2025
World Championship	1		
UK Championship	1		
World Open	1		
Welsh Open	1		
British Open	1		
World Grand Prix	1		
European Masters	1		
Gibraltar Open	1		
China Championship	1		
Players Championship	2		
Tour Championship	1		
Championship League	1		

Mark Allen (NIR)	12	2012	2025
UK Championship	1		
World Open	2		
International Championship	1		
World Grand Prix	1		
English Open	1		
Northern Ireland Open	2		
Scottish Open	1		
Players Championship	2		
Shoot Out	1		

Kyren Wilson (ENG)	12	2015	2026
World Championship	1		
Shanghai Masters	1		
International Championship	1		
German Masters	2		
Paul Hunter Classic	1		
European Masters	1		
Northern Ireland Open	2		
Players Championship	1		
Championship League	1		
Xi'an Grand Prix	1		

Jimmy White (ENG)	10	1986	2004
UK Championship	1		
World Open	2		
British Open	2		
Canadian Masters	1		
Classic	2		
European Masters	1		
Scottish Open	1		

John Parrott (ENG) (Note: John Parrott won the German Masters tournament in 1998 but this was not a ranking win.)	9	1989	1996
World Championship	1		
UK Championship	1		
Dubai Classic	3		
European Masters	3		
Scottish Open	1		

Peter Ebdon (ENG)	9	1993	2012
World Championship	1		
UK Championship	1		
World Open	1		
China Open	2		
British Open	1		
Irish Masters	1		
Scottish Open	1		
Thailand Masters	1		

Stephen Maguire (SCO)	7	2004	2025
UK Championship	1		
Welsh Open	1		
China Open	1		
Northern Ireland Trophy	1		
European Masters	1		
Tour Championship	1		
Championship League	1		

Ali Carter (ENG)	7	2009	2026
World Open	1		
Welsh Open	1		
Shanghai Masters	1		
German Masters	2		
English Open	1		
Championship League	1		

Ken Doherty (IRL)	6	1993	2006
World Championship	1		
Welsh Open	2		
Malta Grand Prix	1		
European Masters	1		
Thailand Masters	1		

Stuart Bingham (ENG)	6	2011	2019
World Championship	1		
Welsh Open	1		
Shanghai Masters	1		
Australian Goldfields Open	1		
English Open	1		
Gibraltar Open	1		

Zhao Xintong (CHN)	6	2021	2026
World Championship	1		
UK Championship	1		
German Masters	1		
World Grand Prix	1		
Players Championship	1		
Tour Championship	1		

Ray Reardon (WAL) (Note: Ray Reardon won six World Snooker Championships but two were non-ranking.)	5	1974	1982
World Championship	4		
World Open	1		

Stephen Lee (ENG)	5	1998	2012
World Open	2		
Welsh Open	1		
Scottish Open	1		
Players Championship	1		

Barry Hawkins (ENG)	5	2012	2026
Welsh Open	1		
Australian Goldfields Open	1		
World Grand Prix	1		
European Masters	1		
Players Championship	1		

Ryan Day (WAL)	4	2017	2022
British Open	1		
Riga Masters	1		
Gibraltar Open	1		
Shoot Out	1		

Luca Brecel (BEL)	4	2017	2023
World Championship	1		
Scottish Open	1		
China Championship	1		
Championship League	1		

James Wattana (THA)	3	1992	1995
Thailand Masters	2		
Strachan Open	1		

Paul Hunter (ENG)	3	1998	2002
Welsh Open	2		
British Open	1		

Ricky Walden (ENG)	3	2008	2014
Shanghai Masters	1		
Wuxi Classic	1		
International Championship	1		

Marco Fu (HKG)	3	2007	2016
World Open	1		
Australian Goldfields Open	1		
Scottish Open	1		

Gary Wilson (ENG)	3	2022	2024
Welsh Open	1		
Scottish Open	2		

Wu Yize (CHN)	3	2025	2026
World Championship	1		
International Championship	1		
Xi'an Grand Prix	1		

Tony Knowles (ENG)	2	1982	1983
World Open	1		
Scottish Open	1		

Dennis Taylor (NIR)	2	1984	1985
World Championship	1		
World Open	1		

Cliff Thorburn (CAN)	2	1980	1985
World Championship	1		
Scottish Open	1		

Doug Mountjoy (WAL) (Note: Doug Mountjoy won two UK Championships but one was non-ranking.)	2	1988	1989
UK Championship	1		
Classic	1		

Alan McManus (SCO)	2	1994	1996
Dubai Classic	1		
Thailand Masters	1		

Graeme Dott (SCO)	2	2006	2007
World Championship	1		
China Open	1		

Dominic Dale (WAL)	2	1997	2007
World Open	1		
Shanghai Masters	1		

Anthony McGill (SCO)	2	2016	2017
Indian Open	1		
Shoot Out	1		

Michael White (WAL)	2	2015	2017
Indian Open	1		
Paul Hunter Classic	1		

Joe Perry (ENG)	2	2015	2022
Welsh Open	1		
Players Championship	1		

Robert Milkins (ENG)	2	2022	2023
Welsh Open	1		
Gibraltar Open	1		

Xiao Guodong (CHN)	2	2024	2025
Wuhan Open	2		

Chris Wakelin (ENG)	2	2023	2025
Scottish Open	1		
Shoot Out	1		

Thepchaiya Un-Nooh (THA)	2	2019	2026
World Open	1		
Shoot Out	1		

Jak Jones (WAL)	2	2026	2026
British Open	1		
Championship League	1		

John Spencer (ENG) (Note: John Spencer won three World Snooker Championships but two were non-ranking.)	1	1977	1977
World Championship	1		

Terry Griffiths (WAL) (Note: Terry Griffiths won the UK Championship in 1982 but this was not a ranking win.)	1	1979	1979
World Championship	1		

Alex Higgins (NIR) (Note: Alex Higgins won two World Snooker Championships but one was non-ranking. He also won the UK Championship in 1983 but this was not a ranking win.)	1	1982	1982
World Championship	1		

Willie Thorne (ENG)	1	1985	1985
Classic	1		

Silvino Francisco (RSA)	1	1985	1985
British Open	1		

Joe Johnson (ENG)	1	1986	1986
World Championship	1		

Neal Foulds (ENG)	1	1986	1986
Scottish Open	1		

Tony Meo (ENG)	1	1989	1989
British Open	1		

Mike Hallett (ENG)	1	1989	1989
Australian Goldfields Open	1		

Steve James (ENG)	1	1990	1990
Classic	1		

Bob Chaperon (CAN)	1	1990	1990
British Open	1		

Tony Jones (ENG)	1	1991	1991
European Masters	1		

Dave Harold (ENG)	1	1993	1993
Thailand Masters	1		

Nigel Bond (ENG)	1	1996	1996
British Open	1		

Fergal O'Brien (IRL)	1	1999	1999
British Open	1		

Chris Small (SCO)	1	2002	2002
World Open	1		

David Gray (ENG)	1	2003	2003
Scottish Open	1		

Matthew Stevens (WAL)	1	2003	2003
UK Championship	1		

Martin Gould (ENG)	1	2016	2016
German Masters	1		

Liang Wenbo (CHN)	1	2016	2016
English Open	1		

Mark King (ENG)	1	2016	2016
Northern Ireland Open	1		

Anthony Hamilton (ENG)	1	2017	2017
German Masters	1		

Michael Georgiou (CYP)	1	2018	2018
Shoot Out	1		

Jimmy Robertson (ENG)	1	2018	2018
European Masters	1		

Matthew Selt (ENG)	1	2019	2019
Indian Open	1		

Yan Bingtao (CHN)	1	2019	2019
Riga Masters	1		

Michael Holt (ENG)	1	2020	2020
Shoot Out	1		

Jordan Brown (NIR)	1	2021	2021
Welsh Open	1		

David Gilbert (ENG)	1	2021	2021
Championship League	1		

Hossein Vafaei (IRN)	1	2022	2022
Shoot Out	1		

Fan Zhengyi (CHN)	1	2022	2022
European Masters	1		

Zhang Anda (CHN)	1	2023	2023
International Championship	1		

Tom Ford (ENG)	1	2024	2024
Shoot Out	1		

Lei Peifan (CHN)	1	2024	2024
Scottish Open	1		

Jack Lisowski (ENG)	1	2025	2025
Northern Ireland Open	1		

Alfie Burden (ENG)	1	2025	2025
Shoot Out	1		

Chang Bingyu (CHN)	1	2026	2026
Wuhan Open	1		

Players currently not on the World Snooker Tour

== Minor-ranking tournaments ==
In 1992–93 and from the 2010–11 to the 2015–16 season there were a number of tournaments which contributed to the world rankings but at a lower rate than standard ranking tournaments. Wins in these tournaments are referred to as "minor-ranking titles". There were a total of 69 minor-ranking tournaments; four in the 1992–93 season with the remainder played from 2010 to 2016 as part of the Players Tour Championship.

Mark Selby had the most wins in minor-rankings events with seven. Mark Allen was second with five titles.
A number of players won a minor-ranking event – but have never won a "full" ranking event: Marcus Campbell, Tony Drago, Andrew Higginson, Ju Reti, Rod Lawler, Rory McLeod, Barry Pinches, Troy Shaw, Joe Swail and Ben Woollaston.

== Sources ==
- Turner, Chris. "Ranking Title Winners". cajt.pwp.blueyonder.co.uk. Chris Turner's Snooker Archive. Archived from the original on 10 February 2013.
