= List of World Snooker Championship winners =

Winners of the World Snooker Championship

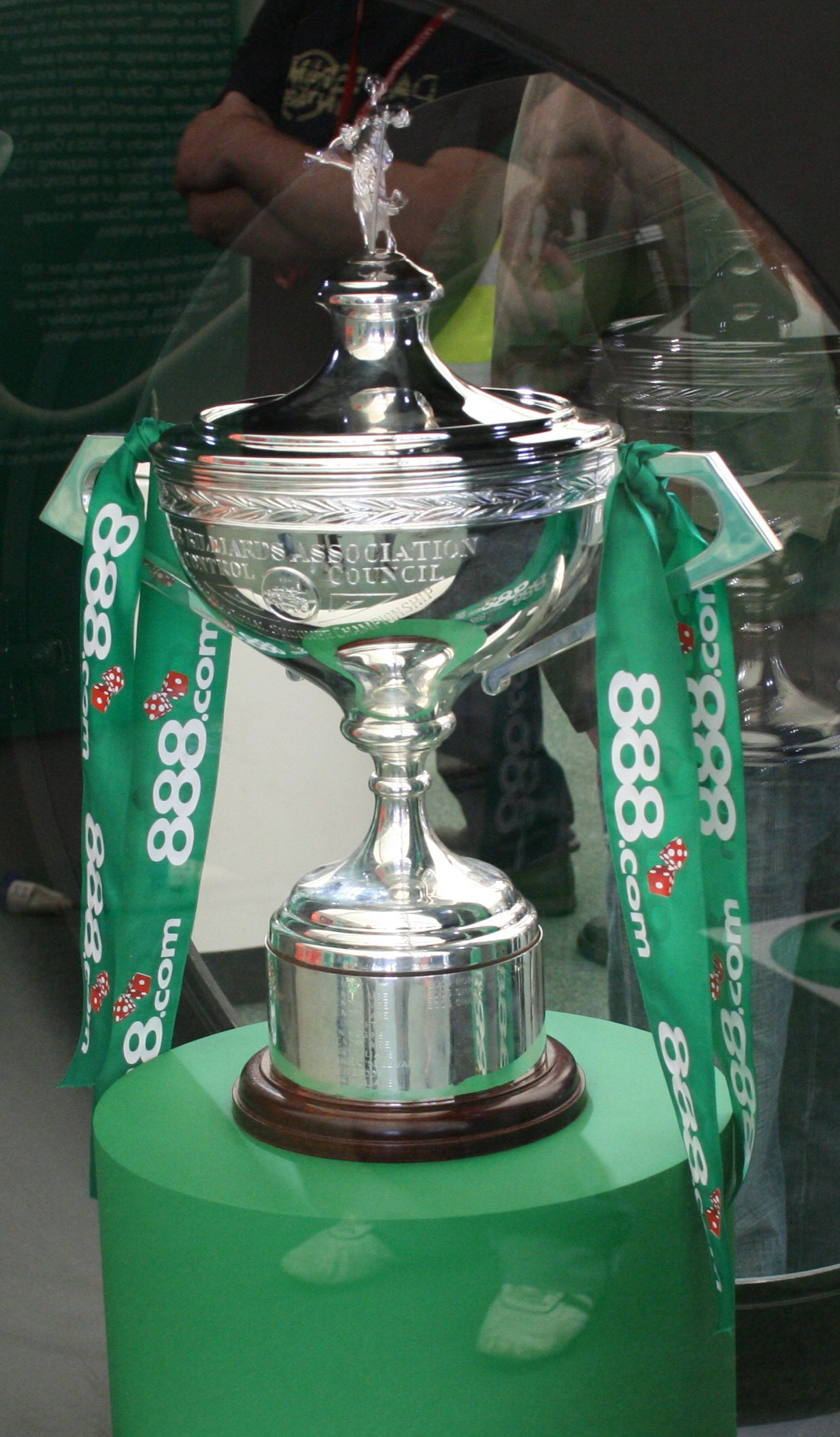
The World Snooker Championship trophy

The World Snooker Championship is an annual snooker tournament founded in 1927, and played at the Crucible Theatre in Sheffield, England since 1977. The tournament is now played over seventeen days in late April and early May, and is chronologically the third of the three Triple Crown events of the season. The event was not held from 1941 to 1945 because of World War II and between 1958 and 1963 due to declining interest from players.

The governing body that organises this event is the World Professional Billiards and Snooker Association (WPBSA). Prior to the WPBSA assuming control of the professional game in 1968, the world championship was organised by the Billiards Association and Control Council (BACC), except for between 1952 and 1957 when the Professional Billiards Players' Association (PBPA) staged their own event, the World Professional Match-play Championship, following a dispute with the BACC.

As of 2026, 30 players have won the Championship. The most successful player at the World Snooker Championship is Joe Davis, who won fifteen consecutive titles between 1927 and 1946. The record in the modern era, usually dated from the reintroduction in 1969 of a knock-out tournament format, rather than a challenge format, is shared by Stephen Hendry and Ronnie O'Sullivan, both having won the title seven times.

== Champions ==
Format
| Format | Organiser |
|---|---|
| Knockout tournament (^{†}) | BACC |
| Challenge event with defending champion receiving a bye to the final (*) | BACC |
| World Professional Match-play Championship (◊) | PBPA |
| Challenge matches (‡) | BACC |
| Knockout tournament | WPBSA |

List of World Snooker Championship winners
| Year | Winner | Runner-up | Final score | Season | Venue |
|---|---|---|---|---|---|
| 1927^{†} | Joe Davis (ENG) | Tom Dennis (ENG) | 20–11 | n/a | Camkin's Hall, Birmingham |
| 1928* | Joe Davis (ENG) | Fred Lawrence (ENG) | 16–13 | n/a | Camkin's Hall, Birmingham |
| 1929^{†} | Joe Davis (ENG) | Tom Dennis (ENG) | 19–14 | n/a | Lounge Hall, Nottingham |
| 1930^{†} | Joe Davis (ENG) | Tom Dennis (ENG) | 25–12 | n/a | Thurston's Hall, London |
| 1931^{†} | Joe Davis (ENG) | Tom Dennis (ENG) | 25–21 | n/a | Lounge Hall, Nottingham |
| 1932^{†} | Joe Davis (ENG) | Clark McConachy (NZL) | 30–19 | n/a | Thurston's Hall, London |
| 1933^{†} | Joe Davis (ENG) | Willie Smith (ENG) | 25–18 | n/a | Joe Davis Centre, Chesterfield |
| 1934^{†} | Joe Davis (ENG) | Tom Newman (ENG) | 25–22 | n/a | Lounge Hall, Nottingham and Central Hall, Kettering |
| 1935^{†} | Joe Davis (ENG) | Willie Smith (ENG) | 25–20 | n/a | Thurston's Hall, London |
| 1936^{†} | Joe Davis (ENG) | Horace Lindrum (AUS) | 34–27 | n/a | Thurston's Hall, London |
| 1937^{†} | Joe Davis (ENG) | Horace Lindrum (AUS) | 32–29 | n/a | Thurston's Hall, London |
| 1938^{†} | Joe Davis (ENG) | Sidney Smith (ENG) | 37–24 | n/a | Thurston's Hall, London |
| 1939^{†} | Joe Davis (ENG) | Sidney Smith (ENG) | 43–30 | n/a | Thurston's Hall, London |
| 1940^{†} | Joe Davis (ENG) | Fred Davis (ENG) | 37–36 (Note: Final was won at 37-35, Fred Davis then won the 1 remaining dead frame.) | n/a | Thurston's Hall, London |
1941–1945: No tournament (Note: Due to World War II)
| 1946^{†} | Joe Davis (ENG) | Horace Lindrum (AUS) | 78–67 | n/a | Royal Horticultural Hall, London |
| 1947^{†} | Walter Donaldson (SCO) | Fred Davis (ENG) | 82–63 | n/a | Leicester Square Hall, London |
| 1948^{†} | Fred Davis (ENG) | Walter Donaldson (SCO) | 84–61 | n/a | Leicester Square Hall, London |
| 1949^{†} | Fred Davis (ENG) | Walter Donaldson (SCO) | 80–65 | n/a | Leicester Square Hall, London |
| 1950^{†} | Walter Donaldson (SCO) | Fred Davis (ENG) | 51–46 | n/a | Tower Circus, Blackpool |
| 1951^{†} | Fred Davis (ENG) | Walter Donaldson (SCO) | 58–39 | n/a | Tower Circus, Blackpool |
| 1952^{†} | Horace Lindrum (AUS) (Note: Due to a disagreement with the Billiards Association and Control Club and the Professional Billiards Players' Association (PBPA), Lindrum and McConachy were the only players to compete, with most professional players playing in the World Professional Match-play Championship instead. As a result, Lindrum's title win is sometimes ignored, with Cliff Thorburn (CAN) usually regarded as the first non-United Kingdom winner.) | Clark McConachy (NZL) | 94–49 | n/a | Houldsworth Hall, Manchester |
| 1952◊ | Fred Davis (ENG) | Walter Donaldson (SCO) | 38–35 | n/a | Tower Circus, Blackpool |
| 1953◊ | Fred Davis (ENG) | Walter Donaldson (SCO) | 37–34 | n/a | Leicester Square Hall, London |
| 1954◊ | Fred Davis (ENG) | Walter Donaldson (SCO) | 45–26 | n/a | Houldsworth Hall, Manchester |
| 1955◊ | Fred Davis (ENG) | John Pulman (ENG) | 38–35 | n/a | Tower Circus, Blackpool |
| 1956◊ | Fred Davis (ENG) | John Pulman (ENG) | 38–35 | n/a | Tower Circus, Blackpool |
| 1957◊ | John Pulman (ENG) | Jackie Rea (NIR) | 39–34 | n/a | Jersey Billiards Association Match Room, St Helier, Jersey |
1958–1963: No tournament (Note: Due to a lack of interest there was no championship organised between 1958 and 1963. In 1964, it was agreed between the Professional Billiard Players Association and the BACC that the championship would be contested by having the reigning champion play in challenge matches. There were seven such challenge matches between 1964 and 1968, until knockout competition resumed with the 1969 Championship. The agreement in 1964 was that there should be a stake by both parties of £50 (equivalent to earnings of £2,000 in 2021), that matches could be of any duration agreed by both participants, and that the challenger would be responsible for finding a suitable venue.)
| 1964‡ | John Pulman (ENG) | Fred Davis (ENG) | 19–16 | 1963–64 | Burroughes Hall, London |
| 1964‡ | John Pulman (ENG) | Rex Williams (ENG) | 40–33 | 1964–65 | Burroughes Hall, London |
| 1965‡ | John Pulman (ENG) | Fred Davis (ENG) | 37–36 | 1964–65 | Burroughes Hall, London |
| 1965‡ | John Pulman (ENG) | Rex Williams (ENG) | 25–22 (Note: The title was decided over a series of matches rather than frames.) | 1965–66 | South Africa |
| 1965‡ | John Pulman (ENG) | Fred Van Rensburg (SAF) | 39–12 | 1965–66 | South Africa |
| 1966‡ | John Pulman (ENG) | Fred Davis (ENG) | 5–2 | 1965–66 | St George's Hall, Liverpool |
| 1968‡ | John Pulman (ENG) | Eddie Charlton (AUS) | 39–34 | 1967–68 | Co-operative Hall, Bolton |
| 1969 | John Spencer (ENG) | Gary Owen (WAL) | 37–24 | 1968–69 | Victoria House, London |
| 1970 | Ray Reardon (WAL) | John Pulman (ENG) | 37–33 | 1969–70 | Victoria House, London |
| 1971 | John Spencer (ENG) | Warren Simpson (AUS) | 37–29 | 1970–71 | Chevron Hotel, Sydney |
| 1972 | Alex Higgins (NIR) | John Spencer (ENG) | 37–31 (Note: Some sources give the score as 37–32. The CueSport Book of Professional Snooker: The Complete Record & History (2004) says "Higgins triumphed 37-31 (not 37-32 as so many publications have wrongly printed)") | 1971–72 | Selly Park British Legion, Birmingham |
| 1973 | Ray Reardon (WAL) | Eddie Charlton (AUS) | 38–32 | 1972–73 | City Exhibition Hall, Manchester |
| 1974 | Ray Reardon (WAL) | Graham Miles (ENG) | 22–12 | 1973–74 | Belle Vue, Manchester |
| 1975 | Ray Reardon (WAL) | Eddie Charlton (AUS) | 31–30 | 1974–75 | Nunawading Basketball Centre, Melbourne, Australia |
| 1976 | Ray Reardon (WAL) | Alex Higgins (NIR) | 27–16 | 1975–76 | Wythenshawe Forum, Manchester |
| 1977 | John Spencer (ENG) | Cliff Thorburn (CAN) | 25–21 | 1976–77 | Crucible Theatre, Sheffield |
| 1978 | Ray Reardon (WAL) | Perrie Mans (SAF) | 25–18 | 1977–78 | Crucible Theatre, Sheffield |
| 1979 | Terry Griffiths (WAL) | Dennis Taylor (NIR) | 24–16 | 1978–79 | Crucible Theatre, Sheffield |
| 1980 | Cliff Thorburn (CAN) | Alex Higgins (NIR) | 18–16 | 1979–80 | Crucible Theatre, Sheffield |
| 1981 | Steve Davis (ENG) | Doug Mountjoy (WAL) | 18–12 | 1980–81 | Crucible Theatre, Sheffield |
| 1982 | Alex Higgins (NIR) | Ray Reardon (WAL) | 18–15 | 1981–82 | Crucible Theatre, Sheffield |
| 1983 | Steve Davis (ENG) | Cliff Thorburn (CAN) | 18–6 | 1982–83 | Crucible Theatre, Sheffield |
| 1984 | Steve Davis (ENG) | Jimmy White (ENG) | 18–16 | 1983–84 | Crucible Theatre, Sheffield |
| 1985 | Dennis Taylor (NIR) | Steve Davis (ENG) | 18–17 | 1984–85 | Crucible Theatre, Sheffield |
| 1986 | Joe Johnson (ENG) | Steve Davis (ENG) | 18–12 | 1985–86 | Crucible Theatre, Sheffield |
| 1987 | Steve Davis (ENG) | Joe Johnson (ENG) | 18–14 | 1986–87 | Crucible Theatre, Sheffield |
| 1988 | Steve Davis (ENG) | Terry Griffiths (WAL) | 18–11 | 1987–88 | Crucible Theatre, Sheffield |
| 1989 | Steve Davis (ENG) | John Parrott (ENG) | 18–3 | 1988–89 | Crucible Theatre, Sheffield |
| 1990 | Stephen Hendry (SCO) | Jimmy White (ENG) | 18–12 | 1989–90 | Crucible Theatre, Sheffield |
| 1991 | John Parrott (ENG) | Jimmy White (ENG) | 18–11 | 1990–91 | Crucible Theatre, Sheffield |
| 1992 | Stephen Hendry (SCO) | Jimmy White (ENG) | 18–14 | 1991–92 | Crucible Theatre, Sheffield |
| 1993 | Stephen Hendry (SCO) | Jimmy White (ENG) | 18–5 | 1992–93 | Crucible Theatre, Sheffield |
| 1994 | Stephen Hendry (SCO) | Jimmy White (ENG) | 18–17 | 1993–94 | Crucible Theatre, Sheffield |
| 1995 | Stephen Hendry (SCO) | Nigel Bond (ENG) | 18–9 | 1994–95 | Crucible Theatre, Sheffield |
| 1996 | Stephen Hendry (SCO) | Peter Ebdon (ENG) | 18–12 | 1995–96 | Crucible Theatre, Sheffield |
| 1997 | Ken Doherty (IRL) | Stephen Hendry (SCO) | 18–12 | 1996–97 | Crucible Theatre, Sheffield |
| 1998 | John Higgins (SCO) | Ken Doherty (IRL) | 18–12 | 1997–98 | Crucible Theatre, Sheffield |
| 1999 | Stephen Hendry (SCO) | Mark Williams (WAL) | 18–11 | 1998–99 | Crucible Theatre, Sheffield |
| 2000 | Mark Williams (WAL) | Matthew Stevens (WAL) | 18–16 | 1999–00 | Crucible Theatre, Sheffield |
| 2001 | Ronnie O'Sullivan (ENG) | John Higgins (SCO) | 18–14 | 2000–01 | Crucible Theatre, Sheffield |
| 2002 | Peter Ebdon (ENG) | Stephen Hendry (SCO) | 18–17 | 2001–02 | Crucible Theatre, Sheffield |
| 2003 | Mark Williams (WAL) | Ken Doherty (IRL) | 18–16 | 2002–03 | Crucible Theatre, Sheffield |
| 2004 | Ronnie O'Sullivan (ENG) | Graeme Dott (SCO) | 18–8 | 2003–04 | Crucible Theatre, Sheffield |
| 2005 | Shaun Murphy (ENG) | Matthew Stevens (WAL) | 18–16 | 2004–05 | Crucible Theatre, Sheffield |
| 2006 | Graeme Dott (SCO) | Peter Ebdon (ENG) | 18–14 | 2005–06 | Crucible Theatre, Sheffield |
| 2007 | John Higgins (SCO) | Mark Selby (ENG) | 18–13 | 2006–07 | Crucible Theatre, Sheffield |
| 2008 | Ronnie O'Sullivan (ENG) | Ali Carter (ENG) | 18–8 | 2007–08 | Crucible Theatre, Sheffield |
| 2009 | John Higgins (SCO) | Shaun Murphy (ENG) | 18–9 | 2008–09 | Crucible Theatre, Sheffield |
| 2010 | Neil Robertson (AUS) | Graeme Dott (SCO) | 18–13 | 2009–10 | Crucible Theatre, Sheffield |
| 2011 | John Higgins (SCO) | Judd Trump (ENG) | 18–15 | 2010–11 | Crucible Theatre, Sheffield |
| 2012 | Ronnie O'Sullivan (ENG) | Ali Carter (ENG) | 18–11 | 2011–12 | Crucible Theatre, Sheffield |
| 2013 | Ronnie O'Sullivan (ENG) | Barry Hawkins (ENG) | 18–12 | 2012–13 | Crucible Theatre, Sheffield |
| 2014 | Mark Selby (ENG) | Ronnie O'Sullivan (ENG) | 18–14 | 2013–14 | Crucible Theatre, Sheffield |
| 2015 | Stuart Bingham (ENG) | Shaun Murphy (ENG) | 18–15 | 2014–15 | Crucible Theatre, Sheffield |
| 2016 | Mark Selby (ENG) | Ding Junhui (CHN) | 18–14 | 2015–16 | Crucible Theatre, Sheffield |
| 2017 | Mark Selby (ENG) | John Higgins (SCO) | 18–15 | 2016–17 | Crucible Theatre, Sheffield |
| 2018 | Mark Williams (WAL) | John Higgins (SCO) | 18–16 | 2017–18 | Crucible Theatre, Sheffield |
| 2019 | Judd Trump (ENG) | John Higgins (SCO) | 18–9 | 2018–19 | Crucible Theatre, Sheffield |
| 2020 | Ronnie O'Sullivan (ENG) | Kyren Wilson (ENG) | 18–8 | 2019–20 | Crucible Theatre, Sheffield |
| 2021 | Mark Selby (ENG) | Shaun Murphy (ENG) | 18–15 | 2020–21 | Crucible Theatre, Sheffield |
| 2022 | Ronnie O'Sullivan (ENG) | Judd Trump (ENG) | 18–13 | 2021–22 | Crucible Theatre, Sheffield |
| 2023 | Luca Brecel (BEL) | Mark Selby (ENG) | 18–15 | 2022–23 | Crucible Theatre, Sheffield |
| 2024 | Kyren Wilson (ENG) | Jak Jones (WAL) | 18–14 | 2023–24 | Crucible Theatre, Sheffield |
| 2025 | Zhao Xintong (CHN) | Mark Williams (WAL) | 18–12 | 2024–25 | Crucible Theatre, Sheffield |
| 2026 | Wu Yize (CHN) | Shaun Murphy (ENG) | 18–17 | 2025–26 | Crucible Theatre, Sheffield |

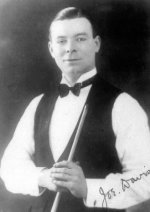
Joe Davis (1927–40 and 1946)

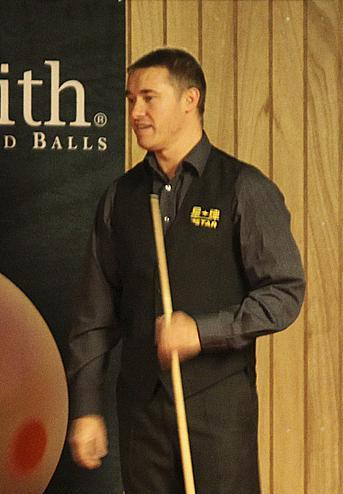
Stephen Hendry (1990, 1992–96 and 1999)

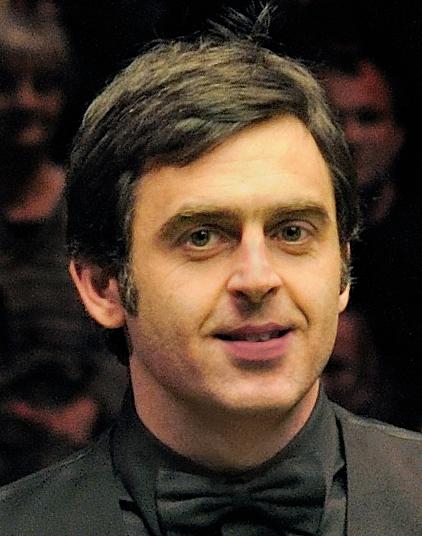
Ronnie O'Sullivan (2001, 2004, 2008, 2012–13, 2020 and 2022)

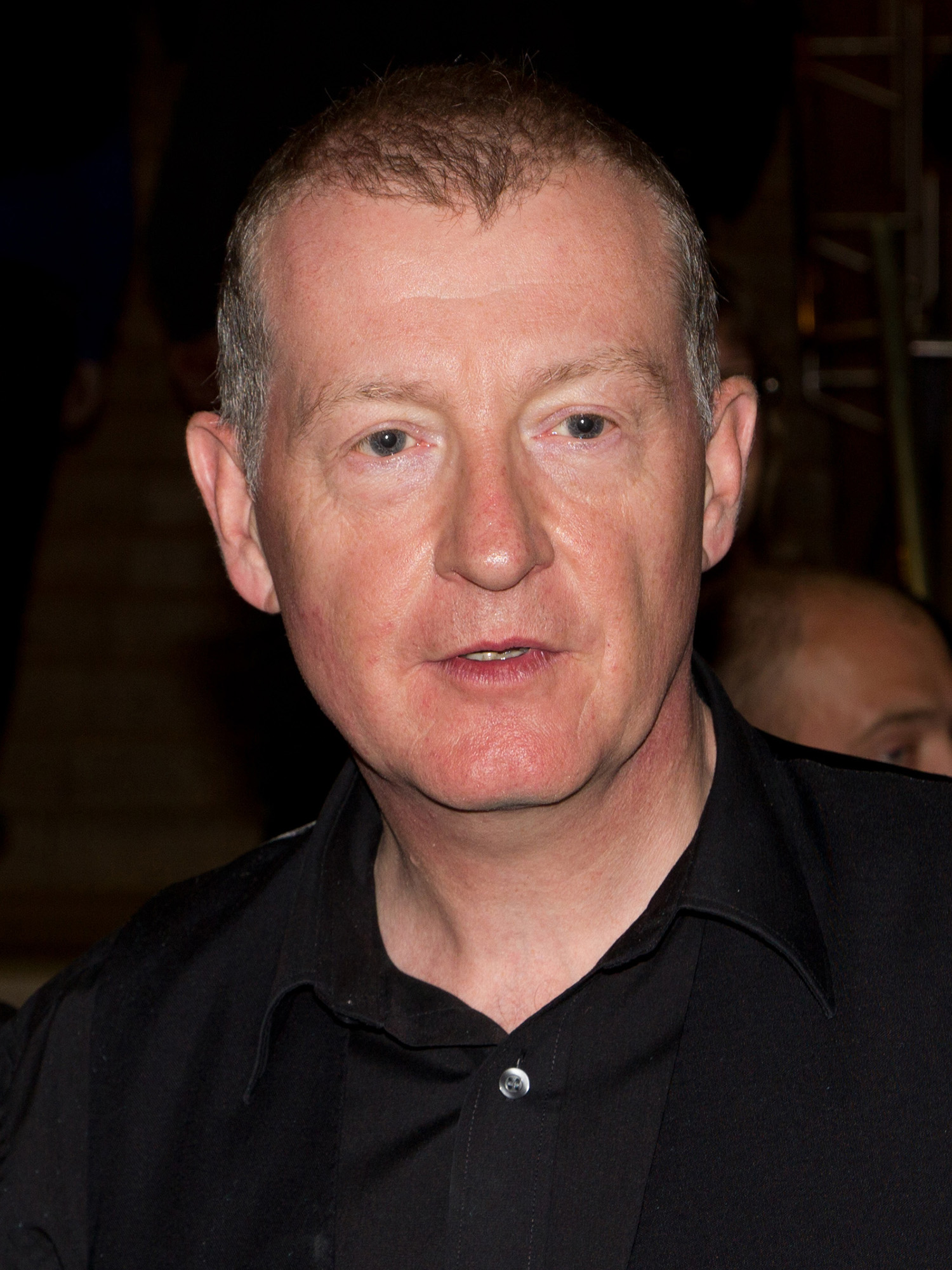
Steve Davis (1981, 1983–84 and 1987–89)

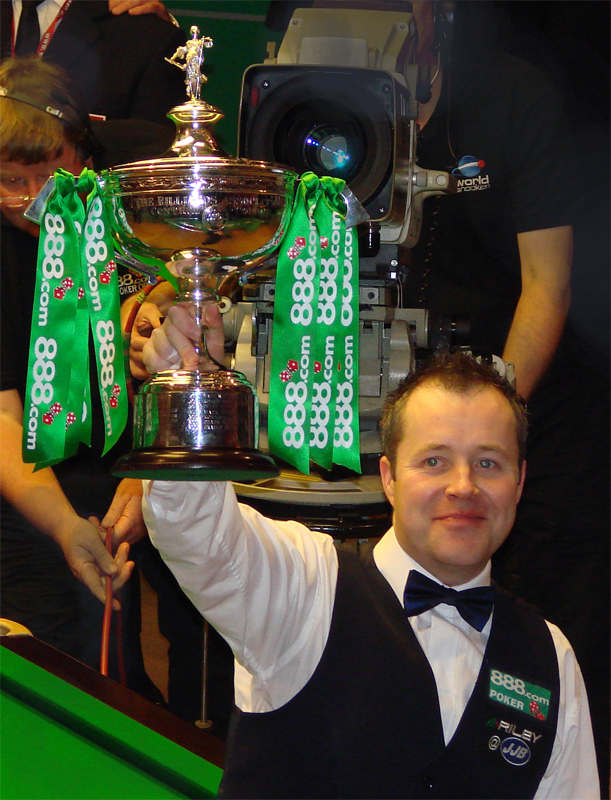
John Higgins (1998, 2007, 2009 and 2011)

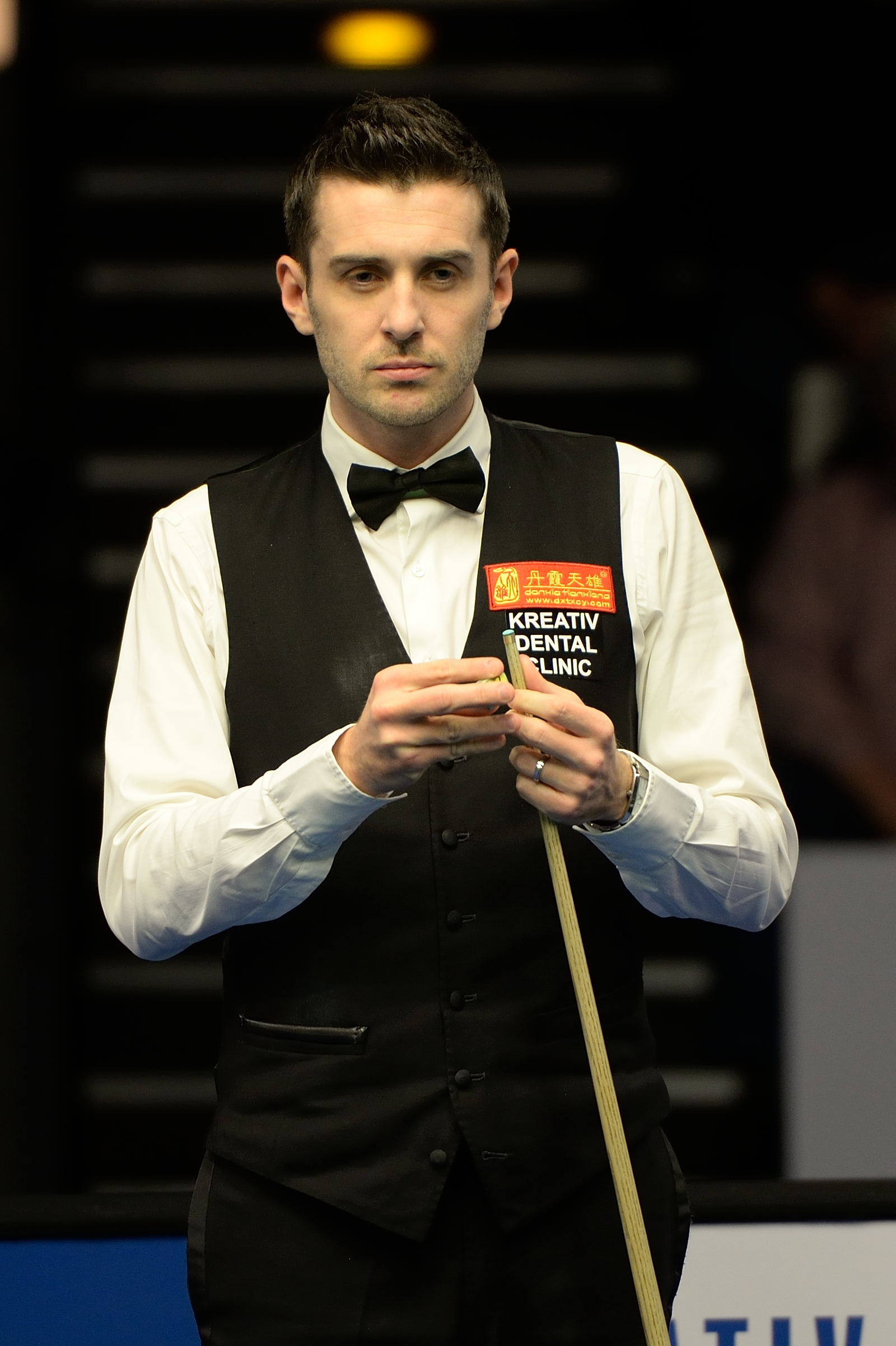
Mark Selby (2014, 2016–17 and 2021)

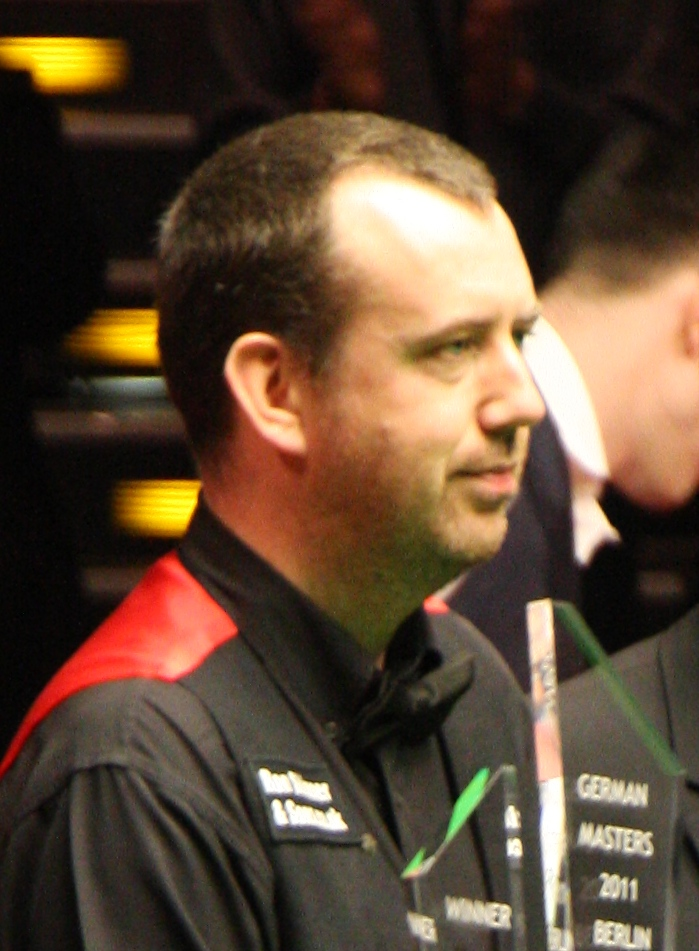
Mark Williams (2000, 2003 and 2018)

== Multiple champions ==
Key
| ‡ | Challenge match |
| * | World Professional Match-play Championship |
| ¤ | Player competed in 2025 |

Multiple-time Snooker World Championship winners
| Player | Total | Years | Status | Ref. |
|---|---|---|---|---|
| Joe Davis (ENG) | 15 | 1927, 1928, 1929, 1930, 1931, 1932, 1933, 1934, 1935, 1936, 1937, 1938, 1939, 1940, 1946 | died 10 July 1978 | |
| Fred Davis (ENG) | 8 | 1948, 1949, 1951, 1952*, 1953*, 1954*, 1955*, 1956* | died 16 April 1998 | |
| John Pulman (ENG) | 8 | 1957*, 1964‡, 1964‡, 1965‡, 1965‡, 1965‡, 1966‡, 1968‡ | died 25 December 1998 | |
| Stephen Hendry (SCO) | 7 | 1990, 1992, 1993, 1994, 1995, 1996, 1999 | retired 2024 | |
| Ronnie O'Sullivan (ENG) | 7 | 2001, 2004, 2008, 2012, 2013, 2020, 2022 | ¤ | |
| Ray Reardon (WAL) | 6 | 1970, 1973, 1974, 1975, 1976, 1978 | died 19 July 2024 | |
| Steve Davis (ENG) | 6 | 1981, 1983, 1984, 1987, 1988, 1989 | retired 2016 | |
| John Higgins (SCO) | 4 | 1998, 2007, 2009, 2011 | ¤ | |
| Mark Selby (ENG) | 4 | 2014, 2016, 2017, 2021 | ¤ | |
| John Spencer (ENG) | 3 | 1969, 1971, 1977 | died 11 July 2006 | |
| Mark Williams (WAL) | 3 | 2000, 2003, 2018 | ¤ | |
| Walter Donaldson (SCO) | 2 | 1947, 1950 | died 24 May 1973 | |
| Alex Higgins (NIR) | 2 | 1972, 1982 | died 24 July 2010 | |
