= 1965–66 snooker season =

Details
- Duration: July 1965 – June 1966
- Tournaments: 3 (non-ranking)

Triple Crown winners
- World Championship: John Pulman (ENG) (×3)

The 1965–66 snooker season was the series of professional snooker tournaments played between July 1965 and June 1966. The following table outlines the results for the season's events.

== Calendar ==
Date (Note: Dates use the mm-dd date format.)			Rank	Tournament name	Venue	City	Winner	Runner-up	Score	Ref.
09-30	12-??	RSA	NR	World Snooker Championship	Various venues, South Africa		John Pulman (ENG)	Rex Williams (ENG)	25–22 (Note: Matches)	
12-??	12-??	RSA	NR	World Snooker Championship	Various venues, South Africa		John Pulman (ENG)	Fred Van Rensburg (SAF)	39–12	
04-??	04-??	ENG	NR	World Snooker Championship	St George's Hall	Liverpool	John Pulman (ENG)	Fred Davis (ENG)	5–2	
