= 2020 World Snooker Championship =

Professional snooker tournament

2020 Betfred World Snooker Championship

Tournament information
- Dates: 31 July – 16 August 2020
- Venue: Crucible Theatre
- City: Sheffield
- Country: England
- Organisation: World Snooker Tour
- Format: Ranking event
- Total prize fund: £2,395,000
- Winner's share: £500,000
- Highest break: John Higgins (SCO) (147)

Final
- Champion: Ronnie O'Sullivan (ENG)
- Runner-up: Kyren Wilson (ENG)
- Score: 18–8

The 2020 World Snooker Championship (officially the 2020 Betfred World Snooker Championship) was a professional snooker tournament that took place from 31 July to 16 August 2020 at the Crucible Theatre in Sheffield, England. It was the 44th consecutive year that the World Snooker Championship was held at the Crucible. The final ranking event of the 2019–20 snooker season, the tournament was originally scheduled to take place from 18 April to 4 May 2020, but both the qualifying stage and the main rounds were postponed as a result of the COVID-19 pandemic. The event was one of the first to allow live audiences since the onset of the pandemic, but on the first day, it was announced that the event would be played behind closed doors for subsequent days. A limited number of spectators were allowed in for the final two days of the championship.

The tournament was organised by the World Snooker Tour, a subsidiary of the World Professional Billiards and Snooker Association, and was broadcast by the BBC, Eurosport and Matchroom Sport. The event had a total prize fund of £2,395,000, with the winner receiving £500,000. Qualifying for the tournament was due to be held between 8 and 15 April 2020, but instead took place from 21 to 28 July at the English Institute of Sport, Sheffield. There were 128 participants in the qualifying rounds, with a mix of professional and invited amateur players, 16 of whom reached the main stage of the tournament, where they played the top 16 players in the snooker world rankings. The event was sponsored by sports betting company Betfred.

Judd Trump was the defending champion, having won his maiden world title at the previous year's event, defeating John Higgins 18–9 in the final. He lost in the quarter-final stage to Kyren Wilson, falling to the Crucible curse. Ronnie O'Sullivan won his sixth world title, defeating Wilson 18–8 in the final. This was O'Sullivan's 37th ranking event win of his career, the most of any player. Higgins made a maximum break in the 12th frame of his second-round loss to Kurt Maflin. This was Higgins' tenth career maximum break and his first at the World Championship; aged 45, he became the oldest player to make a maximum in a professional competition.

== Background ==
The World Snooker Championship features 32 professional players competing in one-on-one snooker matches in a single-elimination format, each match played over several frames. The 32 players for the event are selected through a mix of the snooker world rankings and a pre-tournament qualification round. The first World Snooker Championship took place in 1927, with the final held at Camkin's Hall in Birmingham, England, and the title was won by Joe Davis. Since 1977, the event has been held at the Crucible Theatre in Sheffield, England. As of 2022, Stephen Hendry and Ronnie O'Sullivan are the event's most successful participants in the modern era, having both won the championship seven times. The 2019 championship had been won by England's Judd Trump, who defeated Scotland's John Higgins in the final 18–9 to win his first world title. The winner of the 2020 championship received £500,000, from a total prize fund of £2,395,000. The event is organised by World Snooker in partnership with the World Professional Billiards and Snooker Association.

=== Format ===
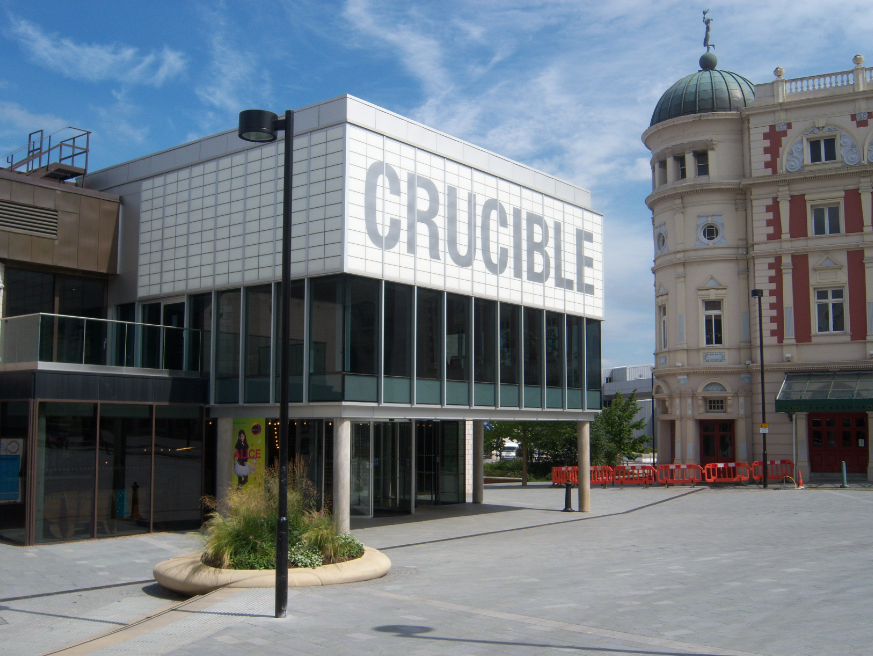
The main draw of the tournament was played at the Crucible Theatre in Sheffield, England.

The tournament was scheduled to take place between 18 April and 4 May 2020 in Sheffield, England, but was postponed to between 31 July and 16 August as a result of the COVID-19 pandemic. The event featured a 32-player main draw that was contested at the Crucible Theatre, as well as a 128-player qualifying draw played at the English Institute of Sport. Qualifying was originally due to take place from 8 to 15 April but was also delayed, eventually taking place from 21 to 28 July 2020 and finishing three days prior to the start of the main draw. In May 2019, the World Snooker Tour announced the event's qualifying format would be changed from the previous year, with seeding given to players with a higher ranking, and played over four rounds instead of three. The tournament was the last of 17 ranking events in the 2019–20 season on the World Snooker Tour. This was the 44th consecutive year that the tournament had been held at the Crucible, and the 52nd successive world championship to be contested through the modern knockout format. The tournament was sponsored by sports betting company Betfred, as it had been since 2015.

The top 16 players in the latest 2019–20 snooker world rankings automatically qualified for the main draw as seeded players. Defending champion Judd Trump was automatically seeded first overall. The remaining 15 seeds were allocated based on the latest world rankings, released after the 2020 Tour Championship which was the penultimate event of the season. Matches in the first round of the main draw were played as the best of 19 frames, second-round matches and quarter-finals were played as the best of 25 frames, and the semi-finals were played over a maximum of 33 frames. The final was played over two days as a best-of-35-frames match.

=== Coverage ===
The tournament was broadcast in the United Kingdom on BBC Television and BBC Online, as well as Eurosport. Internationally, the event was broadcast by Eurosport in Europe and Australia; by Superstars Online, Zhibo.tv, Youku and CCTV in China; by NowTV in Hong Kong; and by DAZN in Canada, the United States, and Brazil. In all other countries, Matchroom Sport broadcast the main tournament, as well as the qualifying rounds, via their new online subscription service.

The World Snooker Championship was intended to be one of the first sporting events to allow spectators after the start of the COVID-19 pandemic. A reduced audience was to be admitted to allow for social distancing. The event, along with the Glorious Goodwood Festival and two county cricket matches, was being used as a trial for live audiences by the UK Government, ahead of restrictions being lifted in October. On the first day of the event, UK prime minister Boris Johnson announced that the sporting pilots were being ended, and spectators would no longer be allowed inside the venue. The World Snooker Tour confirmed an hour later that fans would be admitted for the rest of the first day, but matches were to be played behind closed doors for the remainder of the tournament.

During the semi-final stages, the UK Government announced that the previously postponed sporting event pilots would resume. This meant that the reduced-capacity crowd from the start of the tournament would be allowed back for both days of the final.

=== Prize fund ===
The winner of the event received £500,000 from a total prize fund of £2,395,000. The breakdown of prize money for the event is shown below.

- Winner: £500,000
- Runner-up: £200,000
- Semi-finalists: £100,000
- Quarter-finalists: £50,000
- Last 16: £30,000
- Last 32: £20,000
- Last 48: £15,000
- Last 80: £10,000
- Last 112: £5,000
- Highest break (qualifying stage included): £15,000
- Maximum break (main stage): £40,000
- Maximum break (qualifying stage): £10,000

== Tournament summary ==
=== Qualifying stage ===
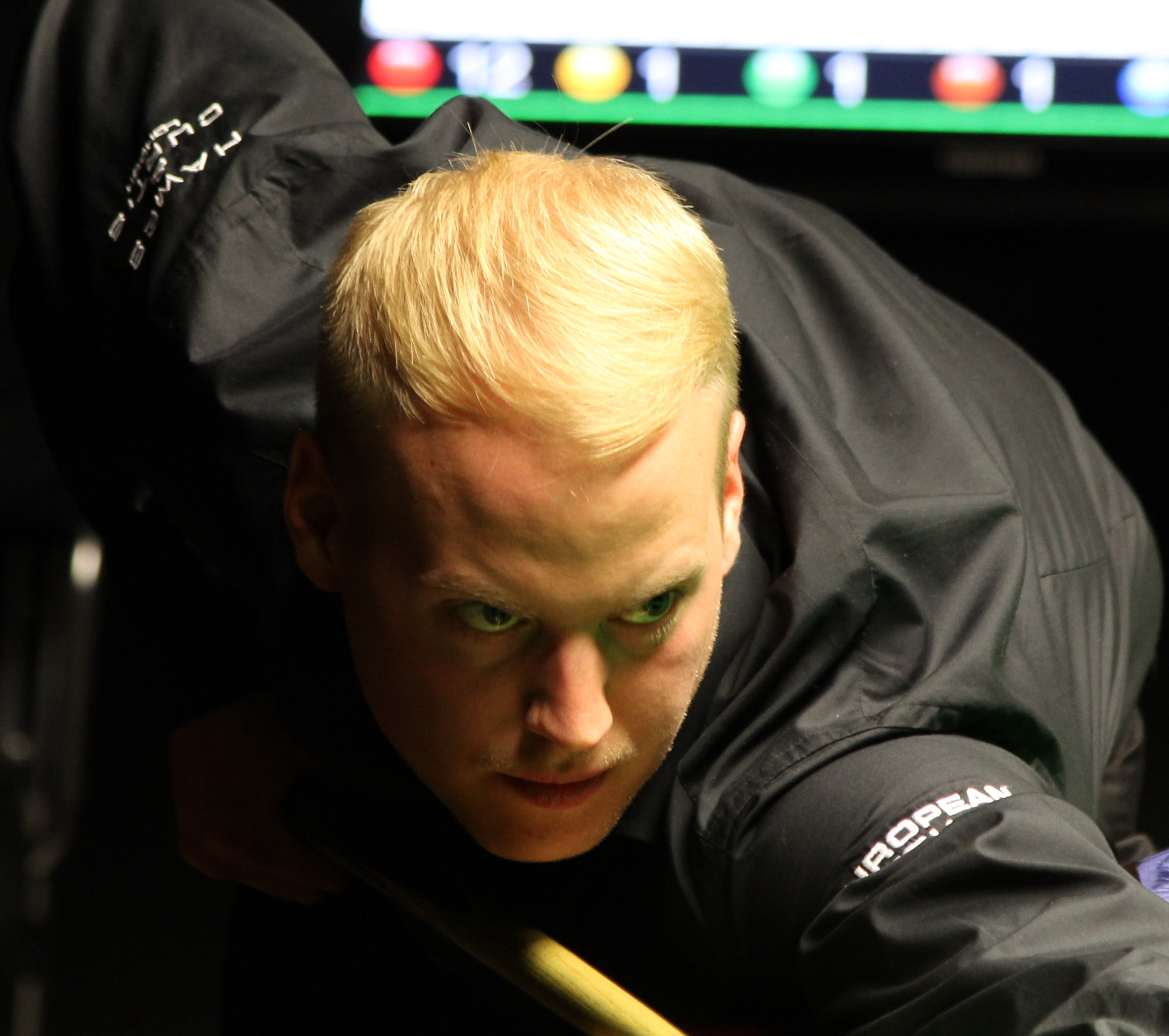
Allan Taylor made the highest break in qualifying, a 145.

Qualifying for the event was held between 21 and 28 July 2020 over four separate rounds, with 16 players progressing into the main draw. James Cahill, who defeated five-time champion Ronnie O'Sullivan in the main stage in 2019, lost in the opening round to amateur player Ben Mertens. Mertens, aged 15, became the youngest player to win a match at the event. Mertens lost in the second round to Sam Baird. Allan Taylor won the Challenge Tour play-off to gain a two-year professional tour card prior to qualifying, and won both of his first two matches 6–1. In these matches, he scored four century breaks, including a career-high 145 – the highest break in qualifying. Six-time runner-up Jimmy White won his first two qualifying matches over Ivan Kakovskii and Michael Georgiou, but lost in the third round to Robert Milkins. Gary Wilson, who reached the semi-finals in the 2019 event, lost in the third round of qualifying to Swiss player Alexander Ursenbacher 3–6. Twice runner-up Ali Carter started in round three, but lost his opening match to Louis Heathcote. This was the first time since 2002 that Carter did not play in the main stage of the event.

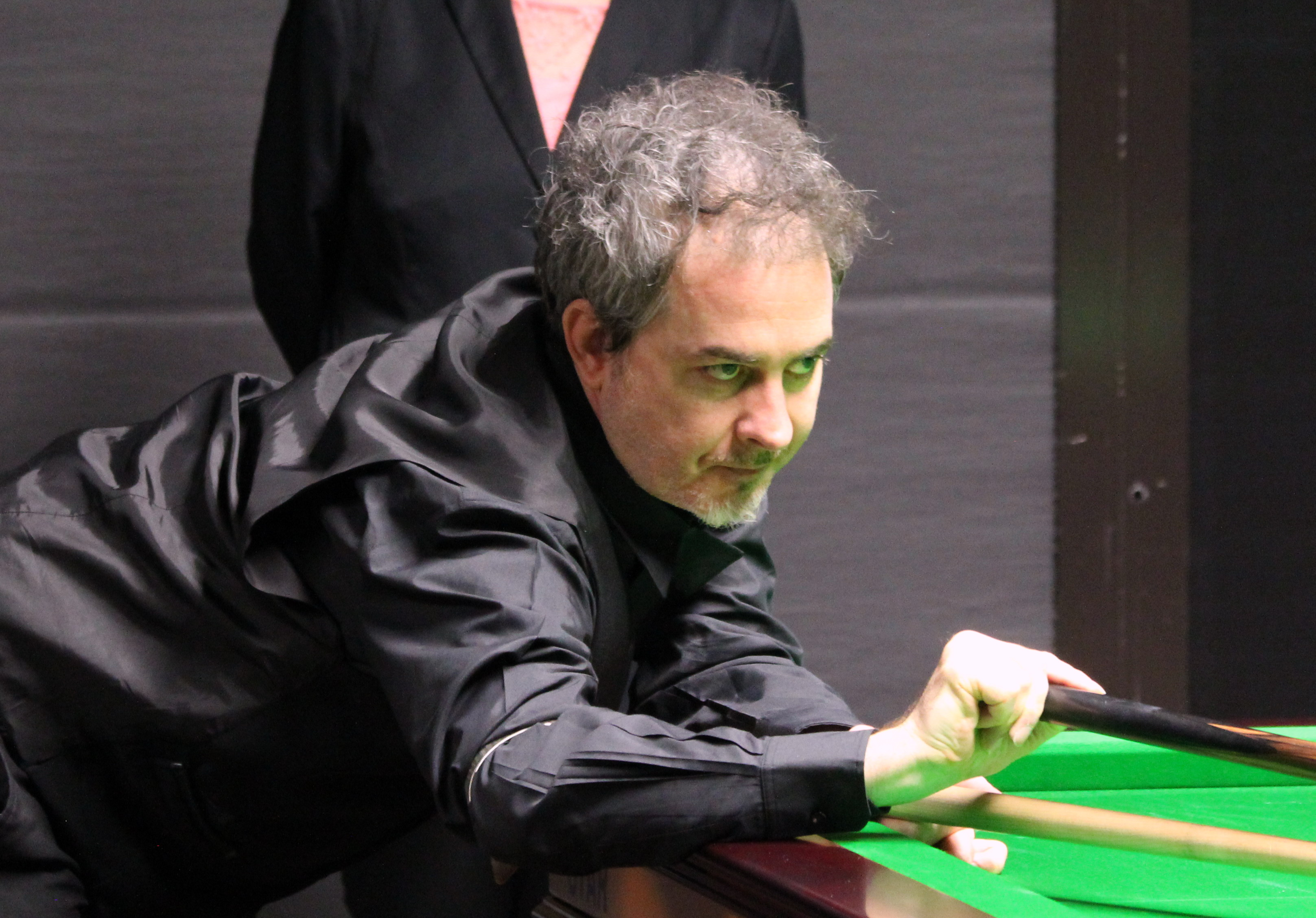
Anthony Hamilton qualified for the event but withdrew before the first round.

The final round of qualifying was played on 27 and 28 July, with matches played as the best of 19 frames over two sessions. Ursenbacher became the first Swiss player to play the main stage of the tournament, after defeating Andrew Higginson 10–8. Ursenbacher led 6–2 after the first session, but the lead was cut to 9–8 before he won frame 18. Alan McManus qualified for the main stage for the first time since reaching the semi-finals in 2016 after defeating Heathcote 10–5. Elliot Slessor won the final nine frames of the match to defeat Martin O'Donnell 10–3. Slessor had promised to plan a wedding with his girlfriend if he made it through the qualifying rounds. Liang Wenbo led Fergal O'Brien 5–2, but won just two frames of the next eight to trail 7–8. The match went to a deciding frame at 9–9 which Liang won with a break of 141. Anthony McGill lost only one frame in his win over Baird, whilst Norwegian player Kurt Maflin defeated Matthew Selt by the same scoreline, 10–1, to qualify for the first time since 2015.

Slessor and Ursenbacher made their debuts in the main draw of the World Championship. Other debutants in the main draw were Jamie Clarke, Ashley Carty and Jordan Brown. Anthony Hamilton qualified for the main draw for the first time since 2008, but withdrew because of health concerns over COVID-19. As an asthmatic, he had criticised the decision to allow a limited number of spectators into the Crucible. Defending champion Judd Trump said Hamilton should have made his decision earlier, as by participating in the qualifiers despite knowing there would be spectators in the final stages he had denied a place to another player.

=== First round ===
The first round took place between 31 July and 5 August, each match played over two sessions as the best of 19 frames. Defending champion Judd Trump played Tom Ford in the opening match. Ford won the first frame, and was on track for a maximum break but missed the pot on the 13th black ball. Ford won the second and third frame as well, before Trump won the next two. Ford won the following two frames, including a break of 140 to lead 5–2, but lost the last two to lead 5–4 after the first session. Ford won the opening frame on the resumption of play, but Trump won the next three frames to take the lead for the first time in the match. Ford won frame 14, before Trump made a break of 131 in the next – his 100th century break of the season. Trump also won the next frame to lead 9–7. Ford won frame 17, but Trump won the match in the next 10–8. Trump became only the second player to make 100 century breaks in a season, after Neil Robertson in the 2013–14 snooker season.

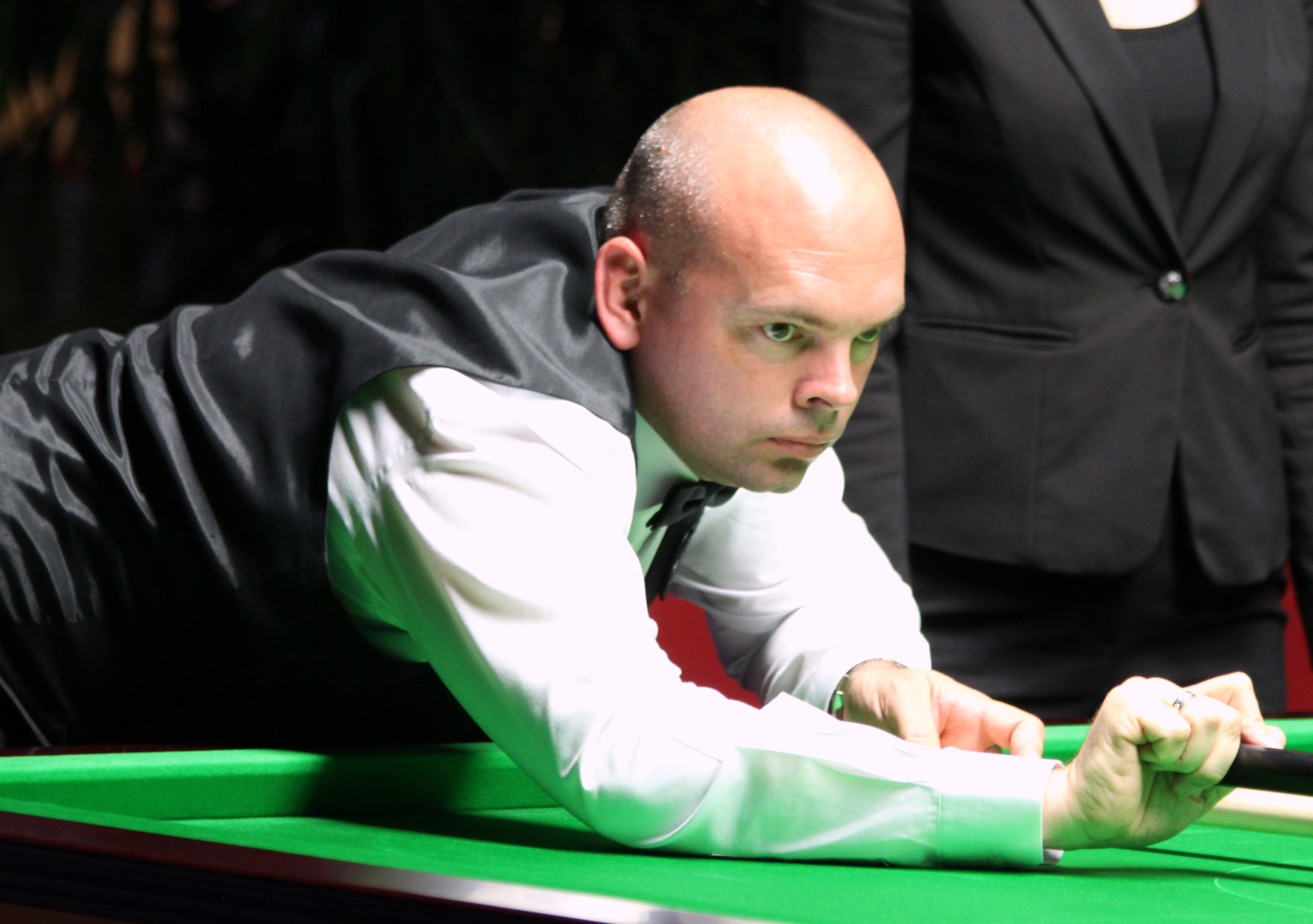
The 2015 champion Stuart Bingham defeated Ashley Carty 10–7.

The 2015 winner Stuart Bingham met qualifier Ashley Carty and led 5–4 after the first session. Bingham then won the next four frames, including a maximum attempt that fell apart on 12 black balls, and a 109 to lead 9–4. Carty then won the next three frames, before Bingham won frame 17 with a break of 82 to win 10–7. The 2019 UK Championship winner Ding Junhui played Mark King. Ding had not played in any tournaments since the onset of the COVID-19 pandemic, but took a 5–4 lead after the first session. The pair were tied at 5–5 to 7–7 before Ding won two frames to lead 9–7. Two long frames were won by King to tie the match at 9–9 and force a deciding frame. Ding won the frame after potting a mid-range red ball to win 10–9.

Three-time champion Mark Williams was drawn against Alan McManus. After the first session of play, McManus led 5–4, despite losing the first two frames. In the second session, Williams won six straight frames to win the match 10–5. After the victory, Williams said "he outplayed me and I was happy to be 5–4 down because it could have been 7–2" after the first session, and added that in the second session he "put pressure on [McManus], then he got frustrated and I knew I had him as long as I didn't make silly mistakes". Four-time champion John Higgins met Matthew Stevens, and held a 6–3 lead after the first session. Stevens won frame 10 with a break of 138, before Higgins won the next two frames to lead 8–4. Stevens won frame 13 but Higgins won the next two frames, including requiring foul shots in frame 14 to win 10–5. The 2010 winner Neil Robertson, met Liang Wenbo and led 5–4 after the first session after breaks of 140, 123 and 87. Liang won the opening frame of the second session to tie the match at 5–5, before Robertson won the next five frames to win the match 10–5.

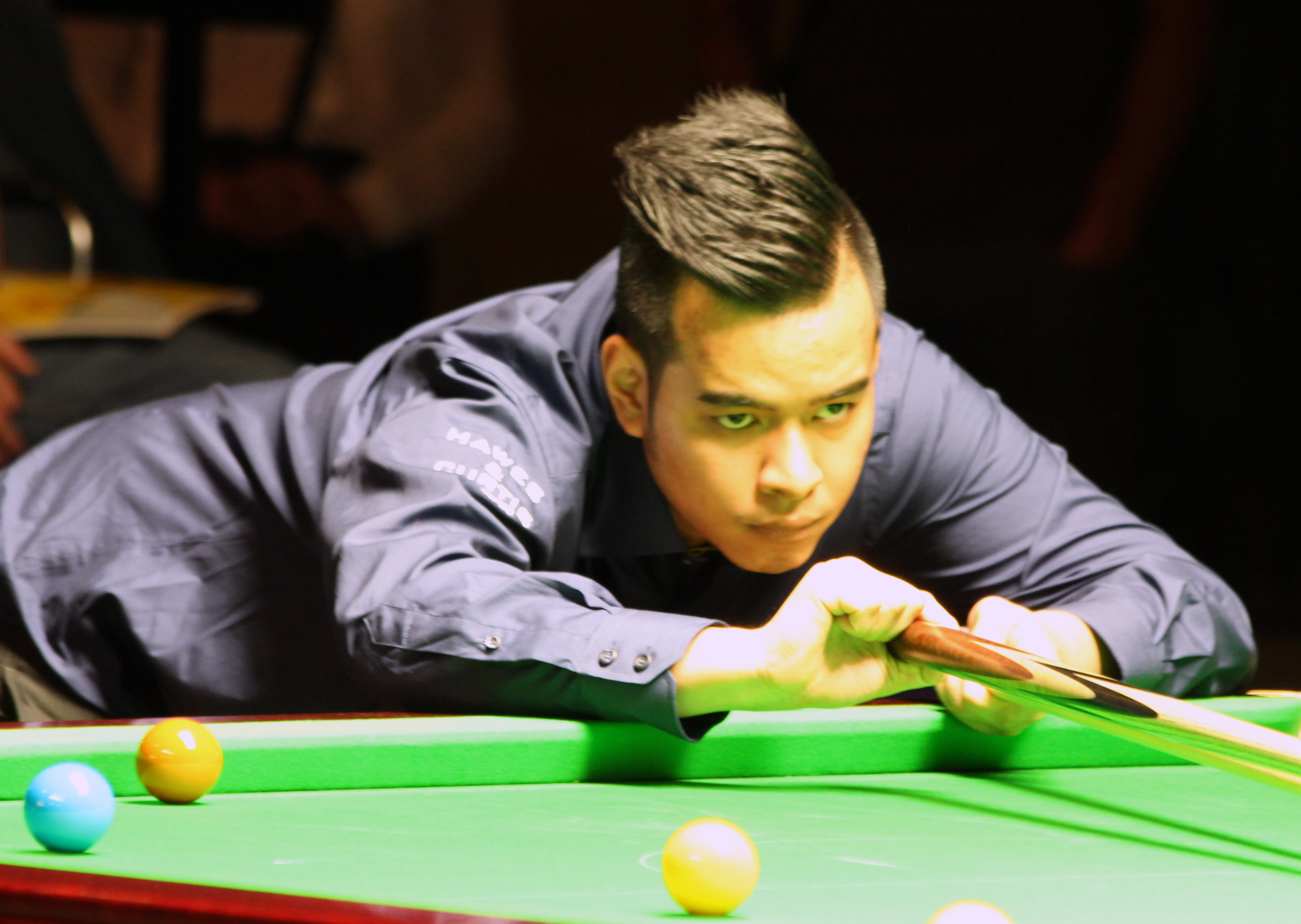
Noppon Saengkham defeated the 2005 champion Shaun Murphy 10–4.

The previous year's semi-finalist David Gilbert played Kurt Maflin, who had not qualified since the 2015 event. Maflin led 3–1 and later 5–4 after the first session. Between frames 9 and 13, there were four century breaks in a row. Maflin attempted a maximum break, scoring 105 in frame 16 to tie the match at 8–8. After running out of position for the 14th black, he gave "the finger" to the table, and received a warning from referee Tatiana Woollaston. Maflin then won the next two frames to win 10–8. Five-time champion Ronnie O'Sullivan averaged less than 14 seconds per shot as he opened an 8–1 lead in the first session against Thepchaiya Un-Nooh. This was quicker than any player's average during the season. In the second session, O'Sullivan clinched the next two frames in less than half an hour to win the match 10–1. With a match time of 108 minutes, O'Sullivan's victory set a new record for the fastest best-of-19-frames match; this was 41 minutes faster than the previous record set by Shaun Murphy in his 10–0 victory over Luo Honghao in 2019. Yan Bingtao played debutant Elliot Slessor, and led 8–1 after the first session. Yan also led 9–2, before Slessor won five frames in a row. Yan won the match 10–7. Anthony McGill took a 5–4 lead after the first session over Jack Lisowski. McGill led 9–6 before Lisowski won three frames to force a deciding frame. The frame was fought over the final blue ball, which was potted by McGill to win 10–9. The 2005 champion Shaun Murphy was defeated by Noppon Saengkham 10–4 in a match Murphy described as "the worst two days of my snooker years".

Three-time champion Mark Selby struggled for form as he defeated Jordan Brown 10–6. In his match against Jamie Clarke, Mark Allen scored two century breaks in the first two frames, and made three other century breaks but lost the match 8–10. Alexander Ursenbacher won the first frame in his match against Barry Hawkins, but won only one other frame and lost 2–10. The final match of the first round was held between Stephen Maguire and Martin Gould. Maguire had won the preceding event at the Tour Championship. Gould made three breaks of 103 and a break of 100 to open a 7–2 lead after the first session, and eventually won the match 10–3.

=== Second round ===
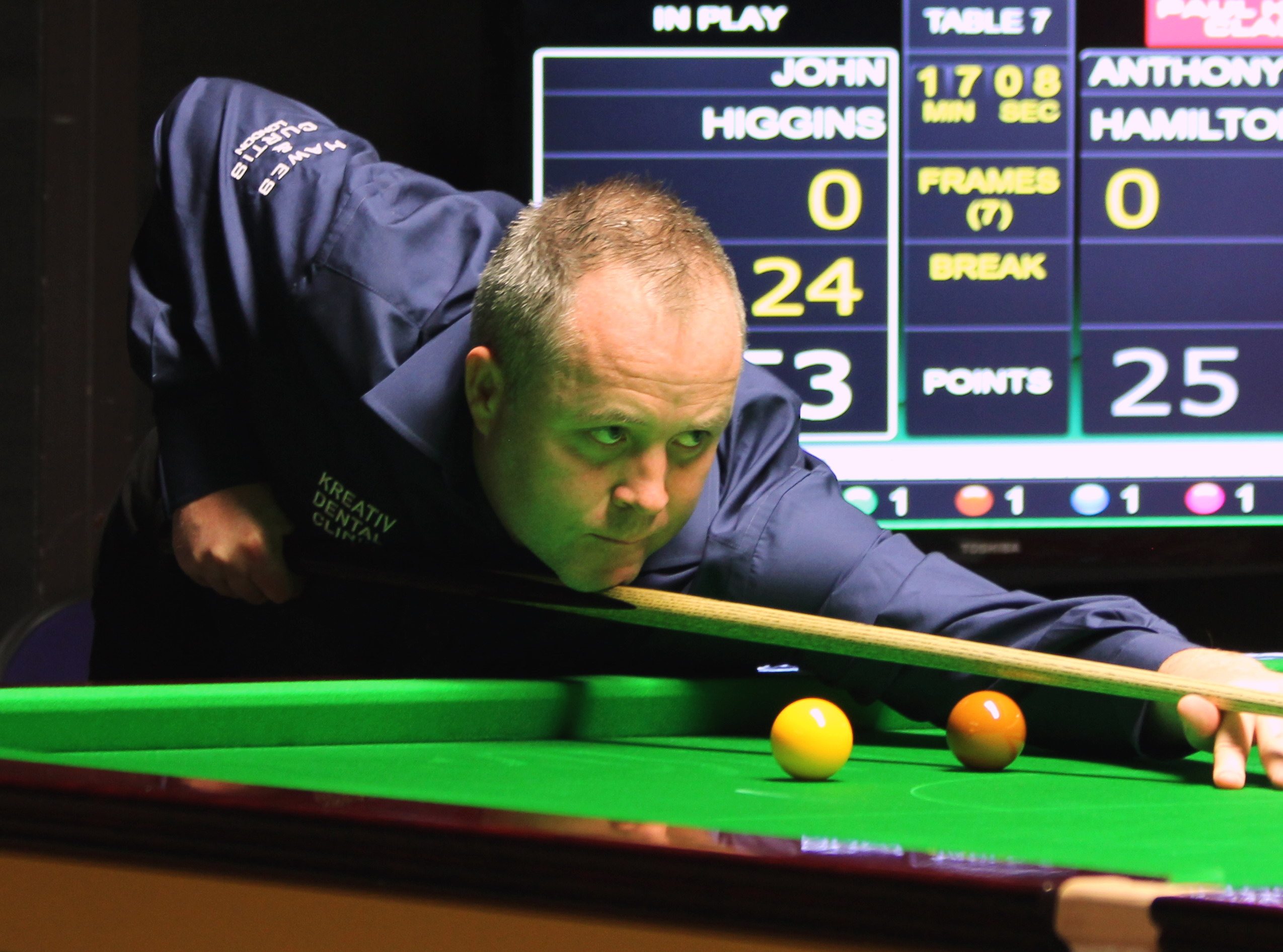
John Higgins scored a maximum break in the 12th frame of his second-round match against Kurt Maflin.

The second round took place between 5 and 9 August, each match played over three sessions as the best of 25 frames. Kurt Maflin took on John Higgins, with Higgins taking the first two frames. Maflin responded by winning the next four frames in a row, before Higgins won frame seven with a break of 101. The final frame of the session was won by Maflin with a break of 81 to lead 5–3. Higgins won frame nine, but Maflin won the next two frames to take a 7–4 lead. In frame 12, Higgins made the highest break of the tournament, a maximum break of 147. The last maximum break at the event was made by Stephen Hendry in 2012. This was Higgins' tenth career maximum break and his first at the event; aged 45, he became the oldest player to make a maximum in a professional competition. They shared frames 13 and 14, however, Higgins won the next two frames to tie the match at 8–8. Maflin won the next two frames, before Higgins took the lead by winning the next three. Maflin, however, also won the three frames to win the match 13–11.

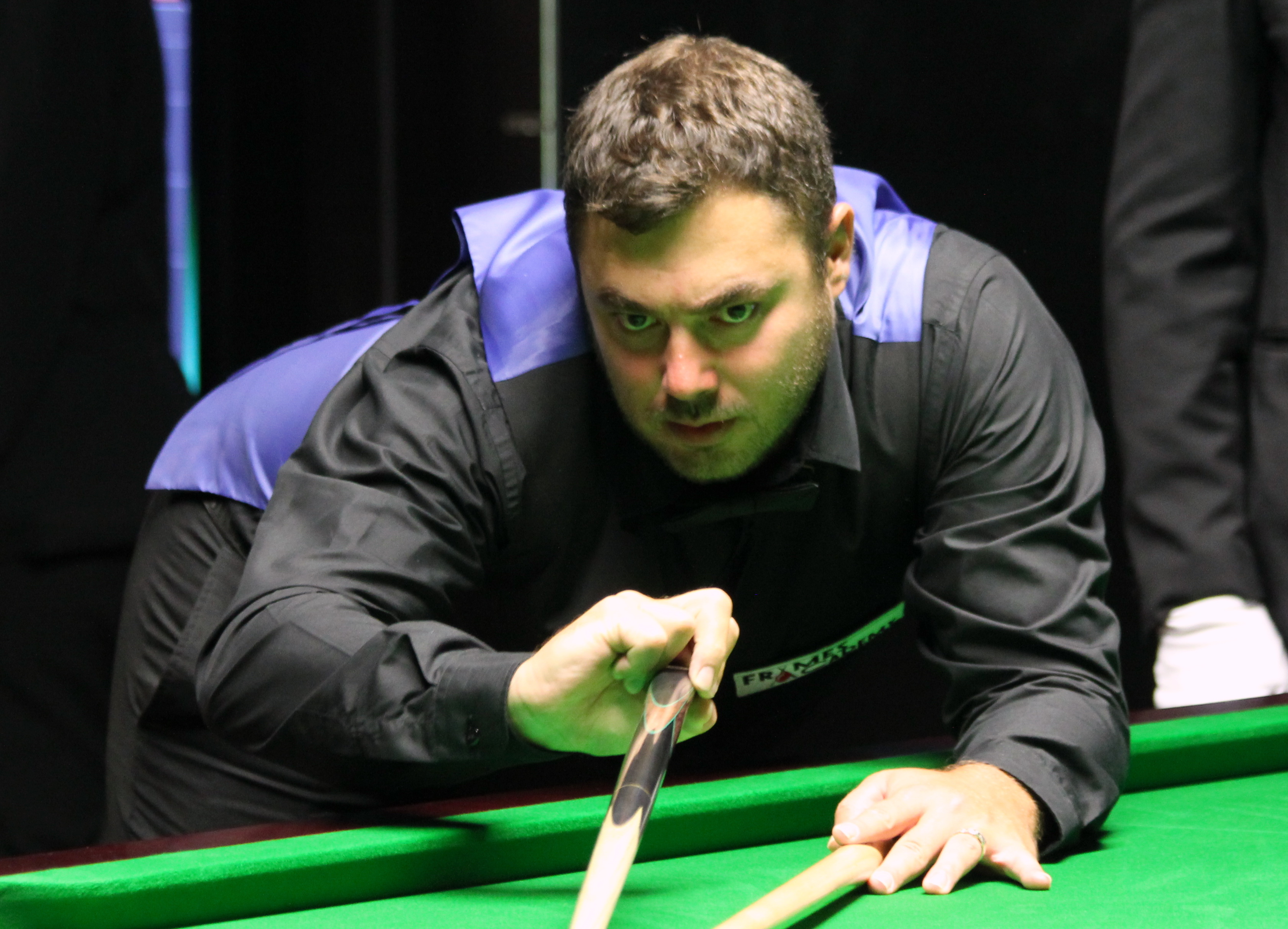
Kurt Maflin defeated four-time champion John Higgins 13–11.

Mark Williams won the first frame in the match against Stuart Bingham, with Bingham winning the next two frames. In frame four, Bingham was seven points ahead, but missed potting the black ball off the spot. Williams potted the black, and also the respotted black to win the frame. Williams then took the next three frames and led 5–3 after the first session. Williams took frame nine, before Bingham won four straight frames to lead 7–6. Williams won the next two frames, but missed a green ball in frame 16 allowing Bingham to tie the match at 8–8. Bingham won frame 17 with a break of 70, before Williams won the next two frames. With the scores later tied at 11–11, Williams won the next two frames to win the match 13–11.

Judd Trump won the first frame against Yan Bingtao, while Yan scored a break of 133 in frame two, before Trump won frame three. Yan then won the next four frames to lead 5–2. Yan missed the final brown ball in frame eight, allowing Trump to make a clearance and finish the session 3–5 behind. Trump won the second session 6–2, to carry a 9–7 lead into the final session, which he won 13–11 with a break of 127. Mark Selby and Noppon Saengkham were tied at 8–8 after the first two sessions of their match, with three-time champion Selby taking a 12–10 lead. Noppon won the next two frames, however, to force a deciding frame. In frame 25, Selby made a century break to win the match 13–12.

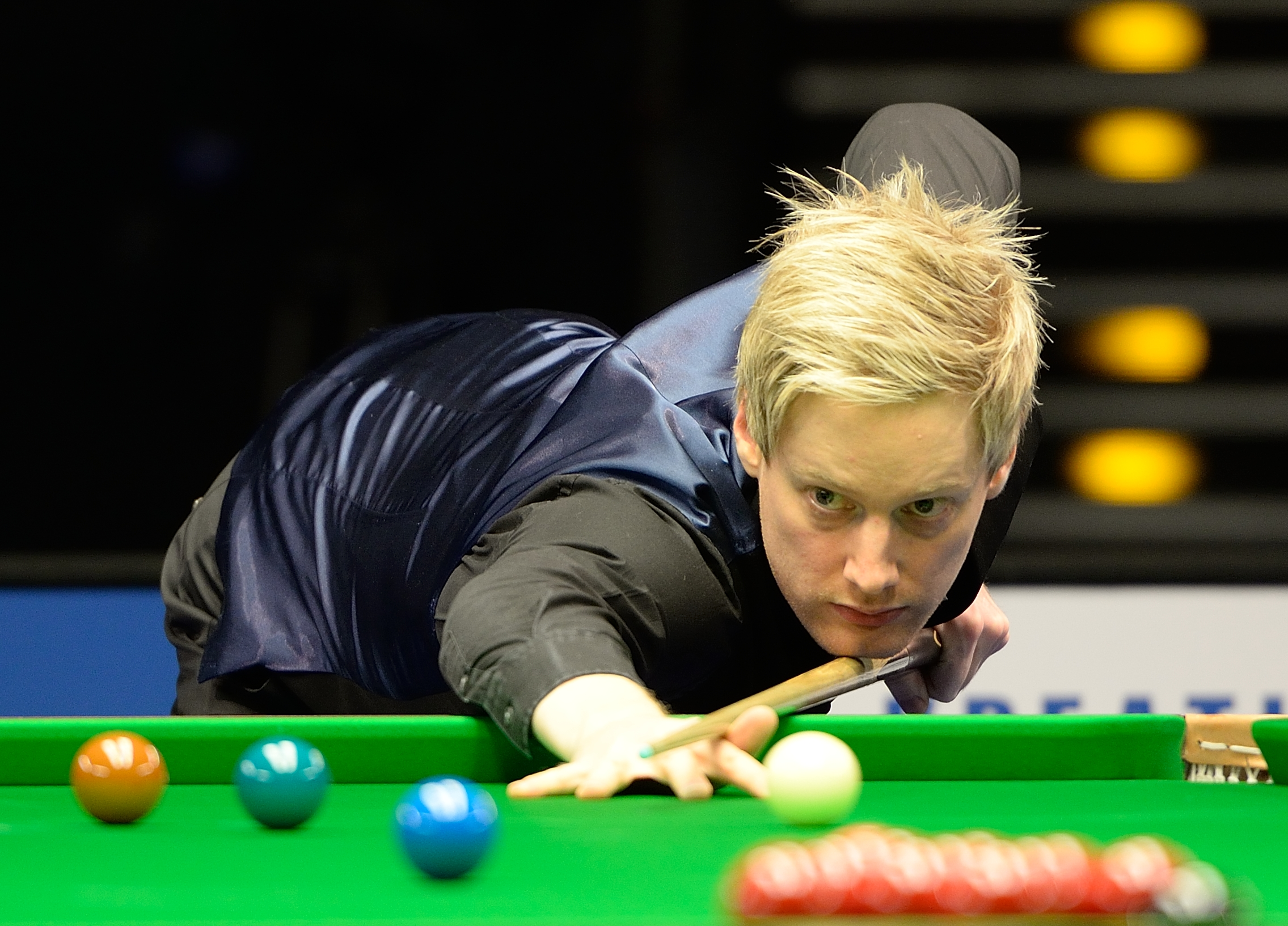
The 2010 champion Neil Robertson defeated Barry Hawkins 13–9.

Kyren Wilson met Martin Gould in the second round; this was Wilson's first match of the main draw, having received a bye through the first round when Anthony Hamilton withdrew from the event at the end of qualifying. Wilson won five of the first six frames of the match, before Gould won the final two of the session. At 5–3 ahead, Wilson won the next five frames in a row to lead 10–3. Gould won the next two frames, but Wilson won the final frame of the second session to lead 11–5. In the final session, Gould won the first three frames, and had won the fourth barring foul shots. In a snooker, Gould missed and conceded a free ball, allowing Wilson enough points to win the frame. Wilson won the match in the 22nd frame, 13–9. Barry Hawkins trailed 2010 champion Neil Robertson 3–5 after the first session of their match, with Robertson winning frame nine to lead by three frames. Hawkins won the next four straight frames to take the lead 7–6. Robertson won the next two frames to lead again, but Hawkins tied the match at 8–8 after two sessions. Robertson won the next two frames, before Hawkins scored a century break in frame 19. Robertson won the next three frames to win 13–9.

Ronnie O'Sullivan, making a record 28th consecutive appearance at the event, was level with Ding Junhui after the first session 4–4. O'Sullivan won frame nine, before Ding won three frames with a 64 and two century breaks to lead 7–5. O'Sullivan also won three frames in a row, before Ding won frame 16 to level at 8–8. O'Sullivan won the match 13–10 to reach a record 19th quarter-final at the event. The final match of the second round was played between two qualifiers – Anthony McGill and debutant Jamie Clarke. Clarke led 7–2; but was reprimanded by McGill for standing in his line of sight during a shot. The pair were reprimanded by referee Jan Verhaas, however, McGill followed Clarke out of the arena. Clarke later tweeted "You want to dance, let's dance". McGill won the remaining five frames of the session to trail 7–8. The pair were tied at 11–11 before Clarke took frame 23 and missed a shot on the pink ball to win in the next allowing McGill to tie the scores at 12–12. In the deciding frame, Clarke failed to escape from a snooker, and left a free ball, which was enough for McGill to win the match 13–12.

=== Quarter-finals ===
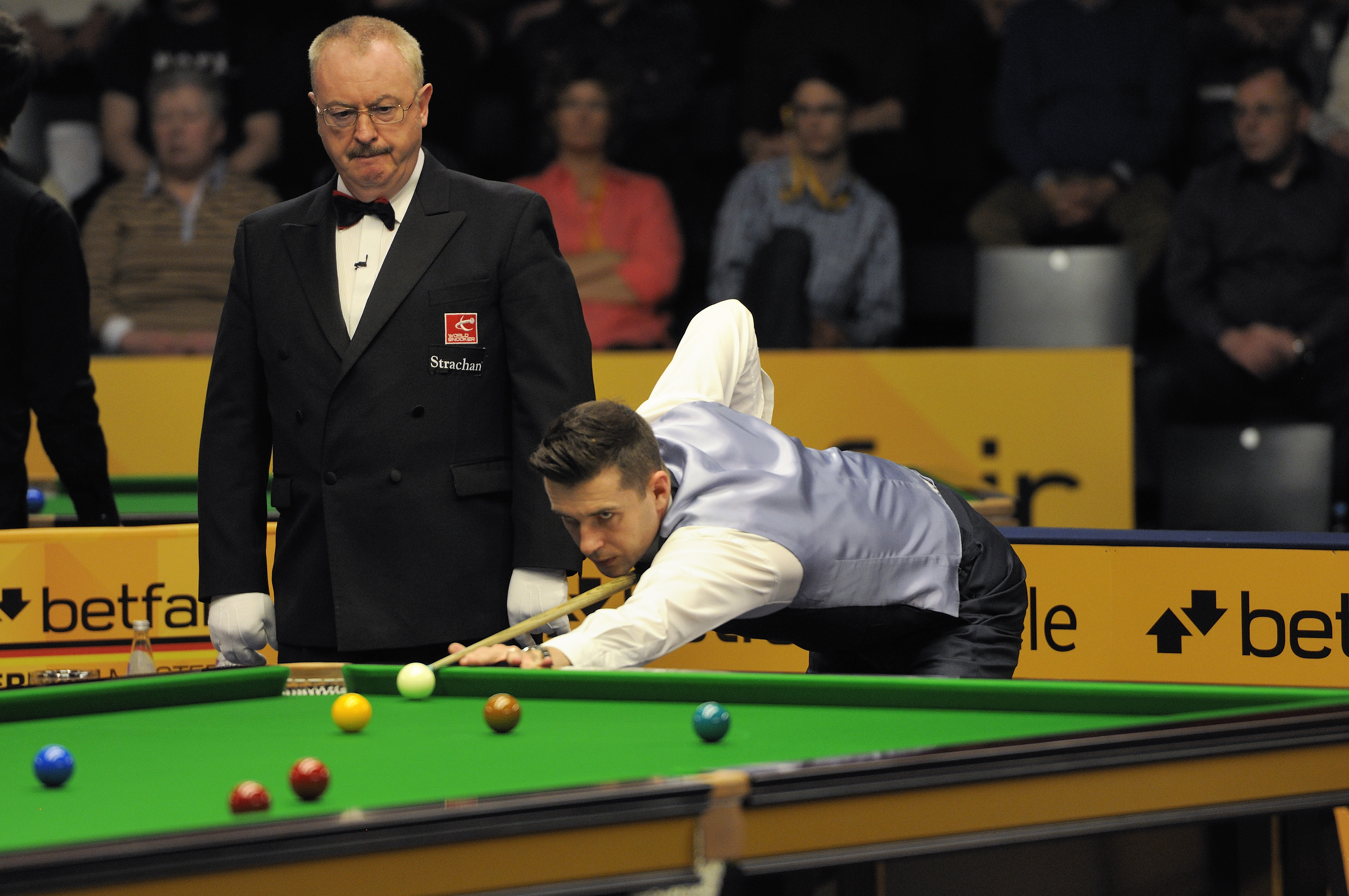
Mark Selby was applauded for the quality of his safety play in his 13–7 win over Neil Robertson.

The quarter-finals took place from 9 to 11 August, each match played over three sessions as the best of 25 frames. Mark Selby played Neil Robertson, with the first frame lasting over 58 minutes. Selby took the frame, and all of the first five of the match. Robertson won the next three frames, including a four-ball plant in the final frame of the session. Selby then won the second session of the match 6–2 to lead 11–5, winning four frames in a row. He also won frame 17 with a break of 91 to lead 12–5, but Robertson won the next two frames. Selby won the match 13–7 when Robertson missed a black ball from the spot. Afterwards, Robertson praised Selby's consistent defensive safety play, whilst Selby acknowledged he had lacked confidence that he could reach that stage of the tournament again.

Defending champion Judd Trump played Kyren Wilson in the second quarter-final. Wilson led 5–3 after the first session, but Trump pulled to one behind twice in the second session. Wilson, however, extended the lead to 10–6 by winning the last three frames of the second session. Trump made breaks of 72, 100 and 62 to trail by one frame, but Wilson won three frames of his own to win the match 13–9. As a first-time champion, Trump was facing the Crucible curse, where since 1977 no player had successfully defended a maiden world title. Trump finished the season with the highest number of ranking events won in a single season (six), and the most century breaks made by any player in the 2019–20 season (102), just one short of Neil Robertson's record in 2013–14.

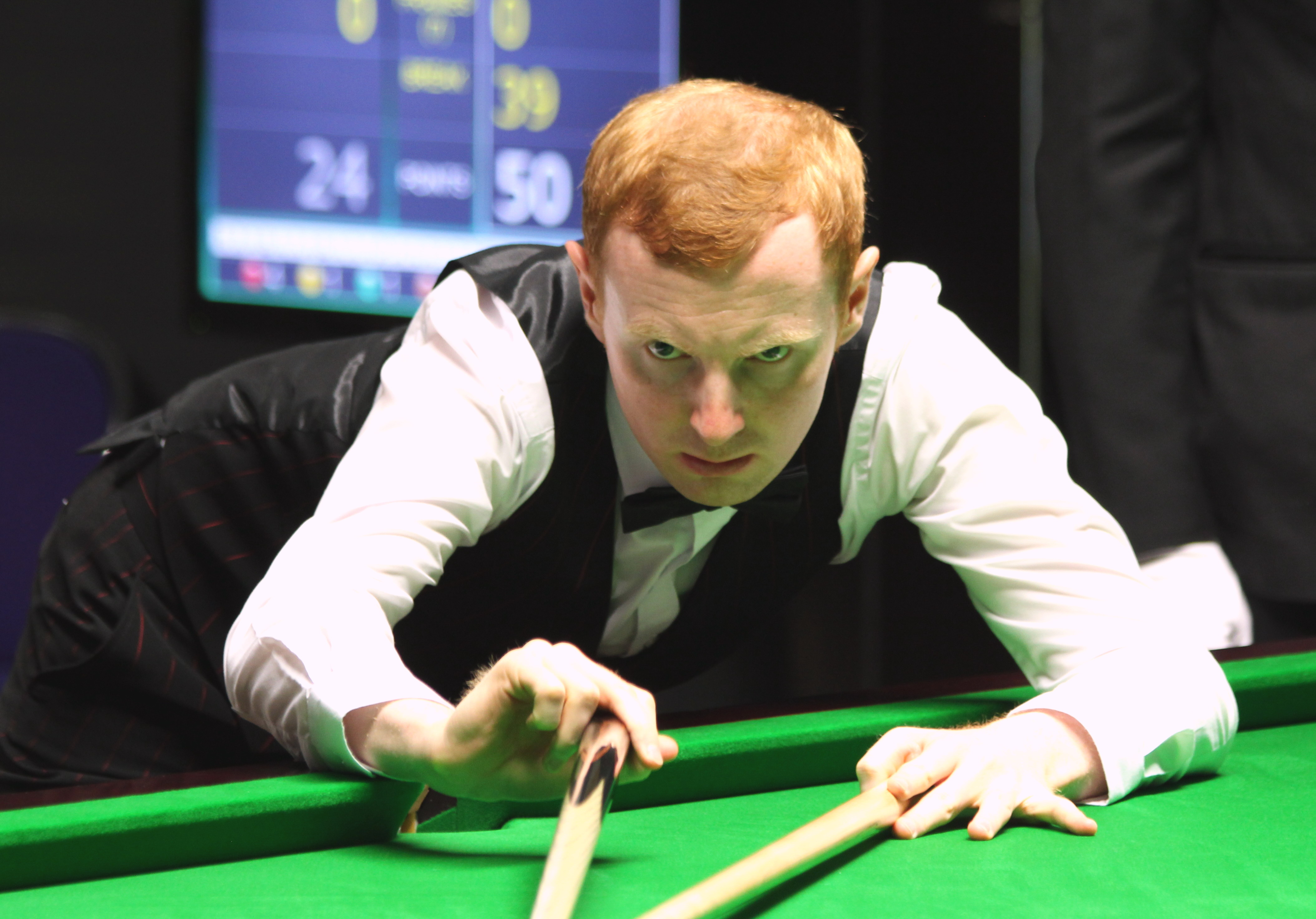
Anthony McGill reached his first World Championship semi-final.

Two former world champions, Ronnie O'Sullivan and Mark Williams, met in the quarter-finals. O'Sullivan was asked before the match about the players' meeting in 2020, as both players turned professional in 1992. He commented that the younger players were "so bad", and that he would have to "lose an arm and a leg" to be outside the top 50 in the snooker world rankings. Williams later reflected that O'Sullivan's remarks had also been aimed at him, and they were "disrespectful". O'Sullivan took a 2–1 lead, but Williams won five straight frames to lead the session 6–2. O'Sullivan missed frame ball in frame nine and went five behind, before he won six of the next seven to tie the match 8–8 after two sessions. Williams won two of the next three frames to lead 10–9, before O'Sullivan made breaks of 104, 61, 65 and 133 to go ahead 12–10, one frame from victory. In frame 23, O'Sullivan missed the blue, which was the only ball he required to win the match, with Williams making a clearance to force a respotted black. Williams missed a shot on the black, then O'Sullivan potted it to win the match 13–10.

Two qualifiers, Anthony McGill and Kurt Maflin contested their first quarter-finals at the World Snooker Championship. McGill won the first three frames of the match with breaks of 53, 63 and 78. Maflin won frame four, and was 54 points ahead in the fifth until he missed a routine pot on the red ball, allowing McGill to win the frame. McGill finished the first session 7–1 ahead. Maflin won five of the next seven frames of the match, before McGill won the final frame of the second session to stay 10–6 ahead. While McGill won the first frame of the final session to lead 11–6, Maflin then won four of the next five frames before McGill wrapped up a 13–10 win.

=== Semi-finals ===
The semi-finals took place from 12 to 14 August, each of the two matches played over four sessions as the best of 33 frames. The first semi-final was between Kyren Wilson and Anthony McGill. McGill won the first two frames with breaks of 83 and 78, before winning frame three after Wilson missed a pot on the green. Wilson won frame four, before McGill won the next two to lead 5–1, with the session ending 6–2 to McGill. In the second session, Wilson won three of the next four frames including a century break to trail 5–7. McGill won frame 13, but Wilson won the final three frames of the second session with three breaks over 75 to tie the match 8–8. Wilson made breaks of 99 and 116 to lead 13–10, but the final frame of the third session was won by McGill.

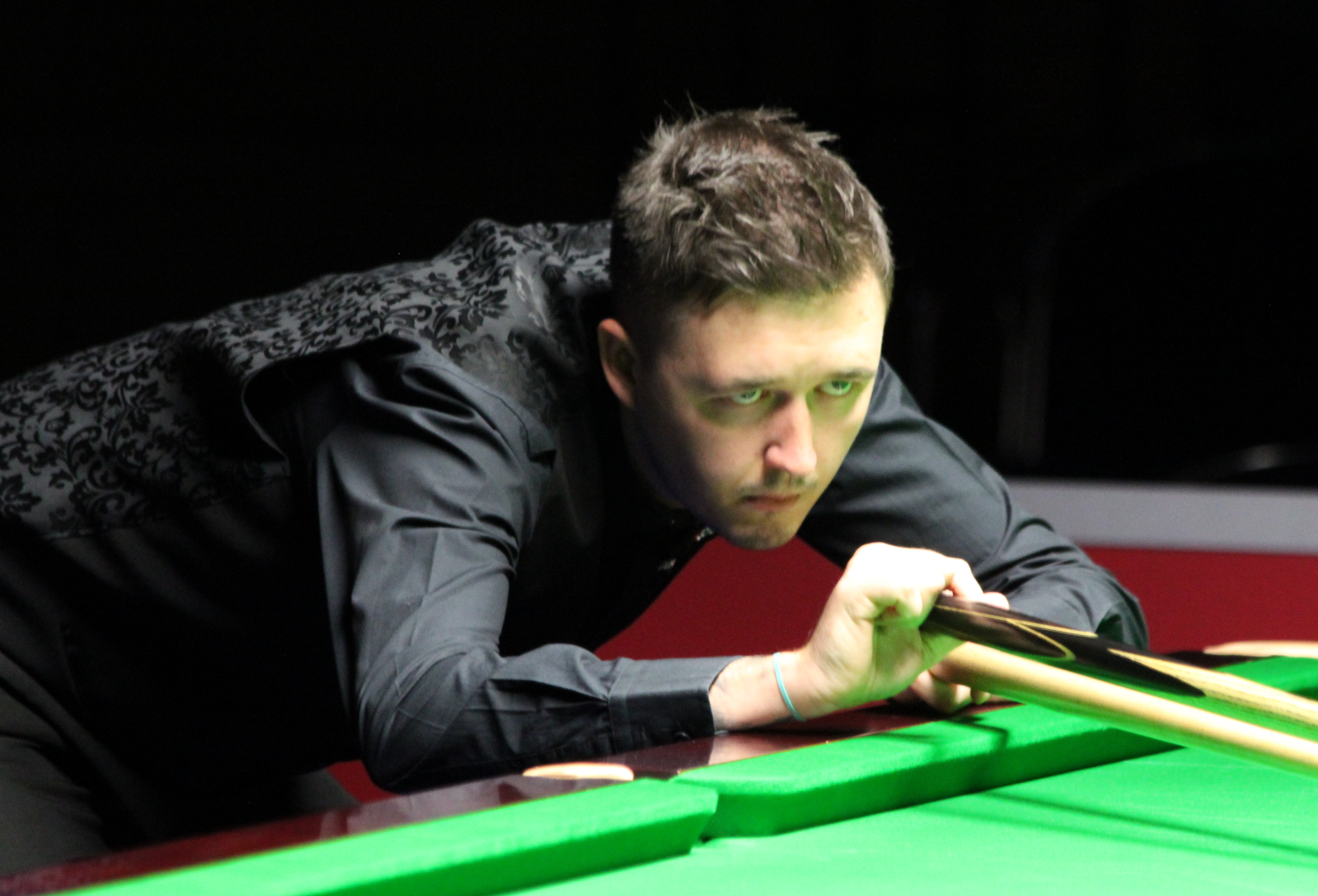
Kyren Wilson reached his first World Championship final after winning a 62-minute deciding frame against Anthony McGill.

McGill made his first two century breaks of the tournament in the final session to tie the match at 14–14, and then took the lead at 16–15. McGill became trapped in a snooker in the penultimate frame, leaving the final red available for Wilson to make a clearance and set up a deciding frame. In the final frame, McGill was snookered behind the yellow ball, and conceded 35 penalty points, missing the shot on eight occasions. This was enough points for McGill to require snookers to remain in the competition. In the next shot, Wilson played a safety shot and went in-off, allowing McGill enough points to be able to win. With the final red ball being slightly above the middle pocket, both players missed shots from the baulk cushion, before McGill potted the red, but ran out of position. Wilson then fluked the green, which won the match.

The deciding frame lasted 62 minutes and made a new record for the most combined points scored in a single frame at the Crucible, 103–83. After fluking the match-winning ball, Wilson became emotional and apologised to McGill. He stated afterwards, "I didn't want it to end that way, I have dreamed of this situation and I didn't want to win the match on a fluke." McGill commented, "I feel as if the match was stolen from me – not by Kyren [Wilson] but by the snooker gods". After the deciding frame, 1991 champion John Parrott remarked, "I have never, in 44 years of playing this wonderful game, seen a frame of snooker like that. It was unbelievable."

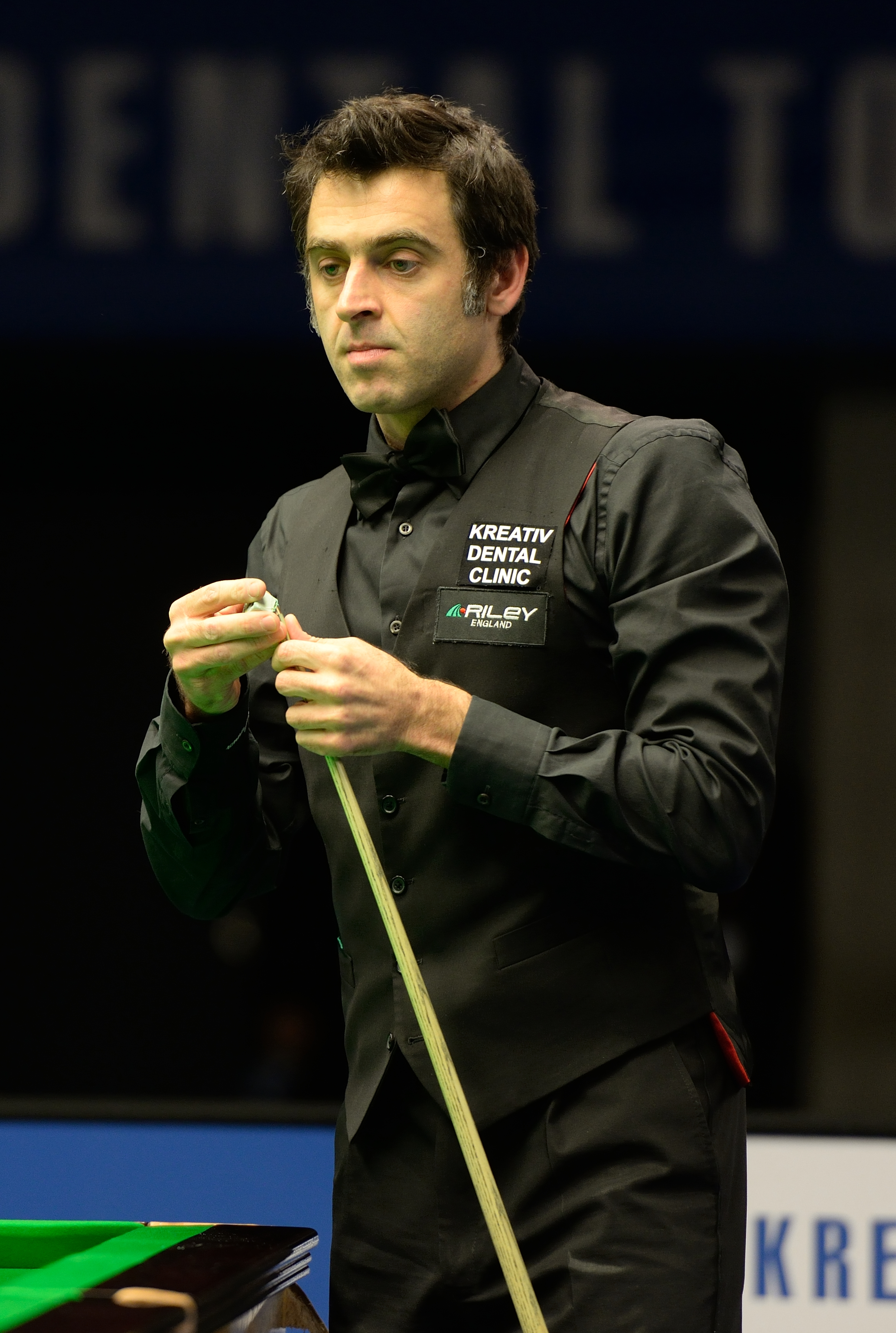
Ronnie O'Sullivan won the last three frames of his semi-final against Mark Selby, to win the match 17–16.

The second semi-final was between Mark Selby and Ronnie O'Sullivan. O'Sullivan won four of the first five frames with there being a lot of kicks in the session, the balls being replaced to counteract the number of bad contacts. Selby trailed 2–5, but won the final frame of the session to trail 3–5. Seven-time champion Stephen Hendry suggested that Selby may have felt he had "almost won" the session after claiming the final frame and avoiding being 6–2 down. Selby then won the next four frames of the match to lead 7–5, before winning two more frames to win the second session 6–2. In the final frame of the session, O'Sullivan rapped his hand on the table in frustration before Selby made a break of 76. Selby took frame 17 with a break of 97, and shared the first four frames to lead 11–9. Selby then won the next frame to lead 13–9, having won 12 out of 17 frames. O'Sullivan then won the last two frames of the session. He also won the next two frames of the final session, including a break of 114, the first century of the match. Selby won the next two frames to lead 16–14, with O'Sullivan playing attacking shots, "hit-and-hope" snooker escapes and "going for broke". O'Sullivan then won the next two frames with breaks of 138 and 71 to also go to a deciding frame. In the decider, O'Sullivan potted a long red, from which followed a 64 break, but he broke down when he missed a long range red to the green pocket. Selby cleared until the final red, and a series of safety shots were played, with O'Sullivan playing one more erratic escape from a snooker, and he potted the match ball after Selby failed to leave the red safe.

Post-match, Selby said, "I felt he was being a bit disrespectful to me and the game, not many players would just get down and hit them at 100 mph when you put them in a snooker. Some would look to work it out or put you in trouble. It just felt like he was doing that throughout the match..." O'Sullivan, however, responded to all questions stating that his cue action was poor, and that he had been struggling to play during the tournament. He also stated that his shot choice was due to his inability to control shots out of snookers the same way Selby did.

=== Final ===
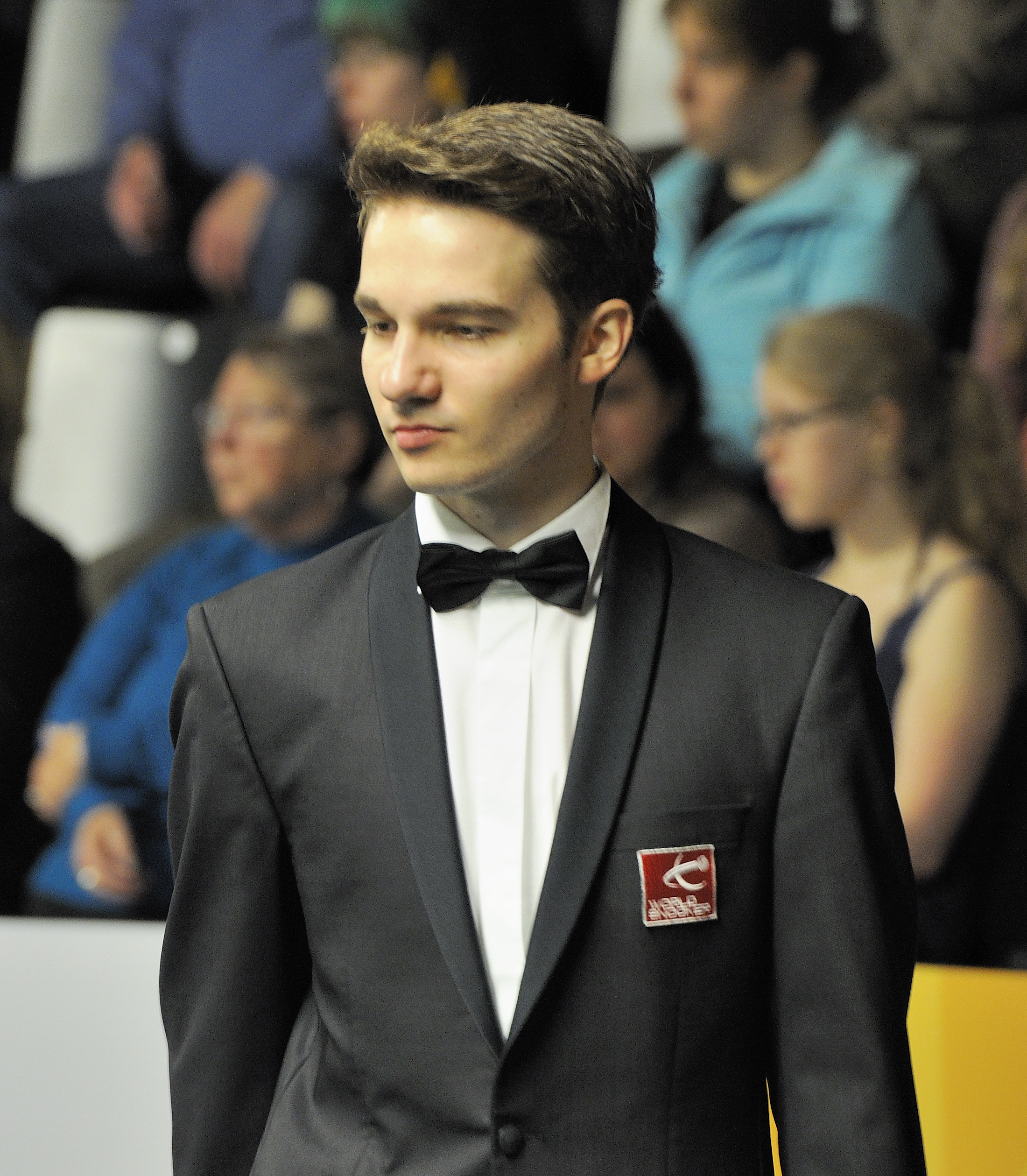
German referee Marcel Eckardt officiated his first World Championship final.

The final was played on 15 and 16 August as a best-of-35-frames match held over four sessions. German referee Marcel Eckardt took charge of his first World Championship final. The two players in the final were five-time world champion Ronnie O'Sullivan and first-time finalist Kyren Wilson. Although O'Sullivan had won four of their six previous meetings, Wilson had won their latest encounter in the semi-finals of the 2020 Welsh Open. O'Sullivan took a 3–1 lead in the first session after a number of missed shots by his opponent. He left the pink ball over the pocket in the fifth frame, allowing Wilson to take advantage and move within a single frame at 2–3. O'Sullivan won the next three frames, including the first century break of the match in frame seven, to lead 6–2 after the first session. BBC pundit Stephen Hendry commented, "I tend to think the match is over. I hope I'm wrong, but I think 6–2 is too far for Kyren to come back from".

Wilson made a break of 53 in frame nine but then made a tactical error and lost the frame, before O'Sullivan took the next to lead 8–2. Wilson won the next four frames, compiling breaks of 92, 50, and 58, to trail 6–8. In frame 15, he unintentionally pocketed a red ball on going into the pack after potting the blue, allowing O'Sullivan to take the frame. Wilson compiled a century break in the next frame, but missed a red in the final frame of the second session to trail 7–10 overnight. The 1997 champion Ken Doherty suggested that failing to pot the red was a missed opportunity for Wilson, whilst O'Sullivan would be "over the moon" to lose only five frames in the session. Six-time champion Steve Davis observed that O'Sullivan's body language during the session might suggest he was "struggling" and "deteriorating".

Wilson made a long pot in frame 18, before taking the frame with a break of 73. O'Sullivan responded by winning all of the next seven frames to finish the third session 17–8 ahead. The final session lasted just 11 minutes and contained only a single frame, as O'Sullivan won the match 18–8 with a break of 96. This was O'Sullivan's sixth world title and his 37th ranking event victory, a record number of ranking titles. He revealed afterwards that he had doubted his form was good enough to win the event: "There was a part of me that decided that I didn't play enough – and I still probably don't play enough – to justify winning a tournament of this stature".

== Main draw ==
Numbers given in brackets after players' names show the seedings for the top 16 players in the competition. Players in bold denote match winners.

**First round** Best of 19 frames
31 July
**Judd Trump (ENG) (1)**	**10**
Tom Ford (ENG)	8
2 & 3 August
**Yan Bingtao (CHN) (16)**	**10**
Elliot Slessor (ENG)	7
4 & 5 August
Stephen Maguire (SCO) (9)	3
**Martin Gould (ENG)**	**10**
31 July & 1 August
**Kyren Wilson (ENG) (8)**	**w/o**
Anthony Hamilton (ENG)	w/d
1 & 2 August
**John Higgins (SCO) (5)**	**10**
Matthew Stevens (WAL)	5
1 & 2 August
David Gilbert (ENG) (12)	8
**Kurt Maflin (NOR)**	**10**
3 August
Jack Lisowski (ENG) (13)	9
**Anthony McGill (SCO)**	**10**
4 August
Mark Allen (NIR) (4)	8
**Jamie Clarke (WAL)**	**10**
31 July & 1 August
**Mark Williams (WAL) (3)**	**10**
Alan McManus (SCO)	5
31 July & 1 August
**Stuart Bingham (ENG) (14)**	**10**
Ashley Carty (ENG)	7
31 July & 1 August
**Ding Junhui (CHN) (11)**	**10**
Mark King (ENG)	9
2 & 3 August
**Ronnie O'Sullivan (ENG) (6)**	**10**
Thepchaiya Un-Nooh (THA)	1
3 & 4 August
**Mark Selby (ENG) (7)**	**10**
Jordan Brown (NIR)	6
3 & 4 August
Shaun Murphy (ENG) (10)	4
**Noppon Saengkham (THA)**	**10**
4 & 5 August
**Barry Hawkins (ENG) (15)**	**10**
Alexander Ursenbacher (SUI)	2
2 August
**Neil Robertson (AUS) (2)**	**10**
Liang Wenbo (CHN)	5

**Second round** Best of 25 frames
6 & 7 August
(England) **Judd Trump (1)**	**13**
(China) Yan Bingtao (16)	11
8 & 9 August
(England) Martin Gould	9
(England) **Kyren Wilson (8)**	**13**
5 & 6 August
(Scotland) John Higgins (5)	11
(Norway) **Kurt Maflin**	**13**
7, 8 & 9 August
(Scotland) **Anthony McGill**	**13**
(Wales) Jamie Clarke	12
5, 6 & 7 August
(Wales) **Mark Williams (3)**	**13**
(England) Stuart Bingham (14)	11
7, 8 & 9 August
(China) Ding Junhui (11)	10
(England) **Ronnie O'Sullivan (6)**	**13**
6 & 7 August
(England) **Mark Selby (7)**	**13**
(Thailand) Noppon Saengkham	12
8 & 9 August
(England) Barry Hawkins (15)	9
(Australia) **Neil Robertson (2)**	**13**

**Quarter-finals**; Best of 25 frames
10 & 11 August
(England) Judd Trump (1)	9
(England) **Kyren Wilson (8)**	**13**
10 & 11 August
(Norway) Kurt Maflin	10
(Scotland) **Anthony McGill**	**13**
10 & 11 August
(Wales) Mark Williams (3)	10
(England) **Ronnie O'Sullivan (6)**	**13**
10 & 11 August
(England) **Mark Selby (7)**	**13**
(Australia) Neil Robertson (2)	7

**Semi-finals**; Best of 33 frames
12, 13 & 14 August
(England) **Kyren Wilson (8)**	**17**
(Scotland) Anthony McGill	16
12, 13 & 14 August
(England) **Ronnie O'Sullivan (6)**	**17**
(England) Mark Selby (7)	16

**Final**; Best of 35 frames
15 & 16 August
(England) Kyren Wilson (8)	8
(England) **Ronnie O'Sullivan (6)**	**18**

Final: (Best-of-35 frames) Crucible Theatre, Sheffield, 15 & 16 August 2020; Referee: Marcel Eckardt
Kyren Wilson (8); England				8–**18**			**Ronnie O'Sullivan (6)**; England			
Session 1: 2–**6**
Frame	1	2	3	4	5	6	7	8	9	10
Wilson	0	**62**^{†}	0	23	**67**^{†} (63)	9	17	49	N/A	N/A
O'Sullivan	**81**^{†} (56)	55	**80**^{†} (80)	**75**^{†} (75)	13	**69**^{†}	**106**^{†} (106)	**60**^{†}	N/A	N/A
Session 2: **5**–4 (7–**10**)
Frame	1	2	3	4	5	6	7	8	9	10
Wilson	53 (53)	19	**92**^{†} (92)	**79**^{†} (50)	**82**^{†}	**86**^{†} (58)	17	**101**^{†} (100)	60	N/A
O'Sullivan	**61**^{†}	**77**^{†} (51)	0	60	25	0	**82**^{†}	10	**68**^{†}	N/A
Session 3: 1–**7** (8–**17**)
Frame	1	2	3	4	5	6	7	8	9	10
Wilson	**74**^{†} (73)	15	33	17	12	28	15	7	N/A	N/A
O'Sullivan	0	**113**^{†} (53)	**109**^{†} (61)	**88**^{†} (57)	**65**^{†} (60)	**71**^{†} (71)	**72**^{†} (72)	**69**^{†}	N/A	N/A
Session 4: 0–**1** (8–**18**)
Frame	1	2	3	4	5	6	7	8	9	10
Wilson	1	N/A	N/A	N/A	N/A	N/A	N/A	N/A	N/A	N/A
O'Sullivan	**104**^{†} (96)	N/A	N/A	N/A	N/A	N/A	N/A	N/A	N/A	N/A
100				Highest break			**106**			
1				Century breaks			1			
7				50+ breaks			**12**			
(England) **Ronnie O'Sullivan** wins the 2020 Betfred World Snooker Championship. † = Winner of frame

== Qualifying ==
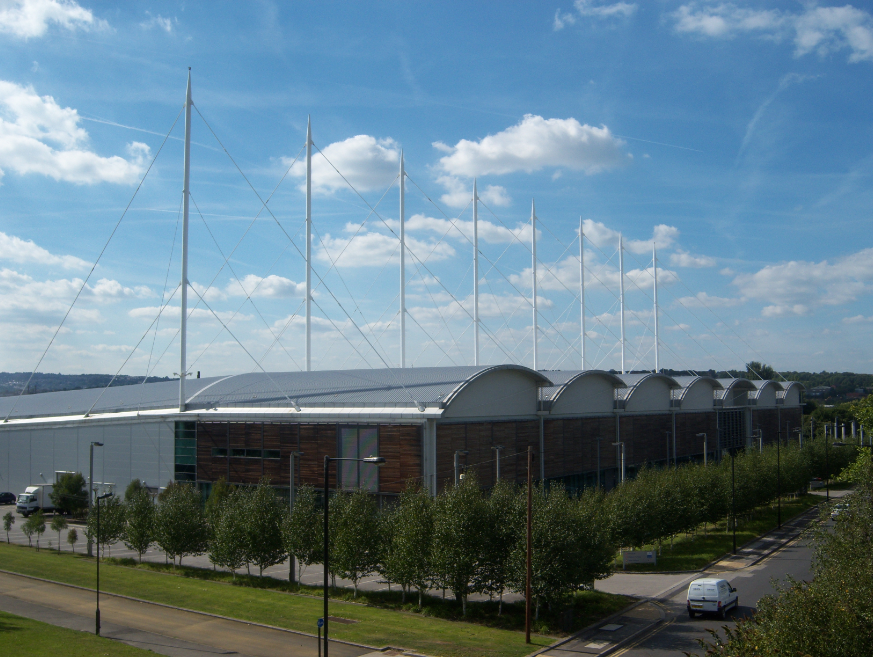
The qualifying rounds were played at the English Institute of Sport in Sheffield.

Qualifying for the 2020 World Snooker Championship took place from 21 to 28 July 2020 at the English Institute of Sport in Sheffield, using an eight-table set-up. Starting with a pool of 128 players, the qualifying competition consisted of four knock-out rounds. Although all matches were originally organised to be the best of 19 frames, the first three rounds were played as the best of 11 frames, with only the final round being played as the best of 19. The 16 winners of the fourth-round matches progressed to the main stage of the tournament at the Crucible Theatre. The 128 qualifiers included 94 tour players ranked outside the top 16, who were joined by 34 wildcard amateur players. The amateur players were selected as follows:

- WSF Open semi-finalists: Ashley Hugill, Iulian Boiko, Dylan Emery, Ross Muir
- 2019–20 Challenge Tour – top ranked player: Lukas Kleckers
- WSF Junior Open semi-finalists: Sean Maddocks, Aaron Hill, Wu Yize
- World Women's Snooker Tour – top ranked player: Reanne Evans
- EBSA European Snooker Championship winner: Andrew Pagett
- EBSA European Under-21 Snooker Championship semi-finalists: Hayden Staniland, Ben Mertens, Brian Ochoiski
- EBSA European Under-18 Snooker Championship semi-finalist: Connor Benzey
- 2019–20 Challenge Tour Play-off competitors: Dean Young, Adam Duffy, Oliver Brown, Allan Taylor, Patrick Whelan, Rory McLeod, Jake Nicholson, Tyler Rees
- Q School Order of Merit: Ross Bulman, Ian Preece, Paul Davison, Hamza Akbar, Chae Ross, Christopher Keogan, Robin Hull, Sydney Wilson, Daniel Womersley
- Austrian national champion: Florian Nüßle
- Polish national champion: Antoni Kowalski
- Russian national champion: Ivan Kakovskii

A total of 17 professional players – 13 from mainland China – chose not to participate in the event due to COVID-19 safety concerns: Zhou Yuelong, Xiao Guodong, Zhao Xintong, Li Hang, Yuan Sijun, Marco Fu, Mei Xiwen, Zhang Anda, James Wattana, Zhang Jiankang, Chang Bingyu, Andy Lee, Chen Zifan, Xu Si, Bai Langning, Lei Peifan and Steve Mifsud. The 2002 champion Peter Ebdon vacated his qualifying position after retiring in April 2020. Two invited players from the World Women's Snooker Tour, Ng On-yee and Nutcharut Wongharuthai, also declined to participate due to COVID-19 safety concerns.

The qualifying draw was released on 10 July 2020. The first qualifying round consisted of 64 players. Professional tour players ranked 81–112 were seeded 65–96, with the remaining tour players and invited amateurs being unseeded. The second qualifying round consisted of players seeded 33–64 against first-round winners. The third qualifying round consisted of players seeded 1–32 against second round winners. The fourth qualifying round was played out between the 32 third-round winners.

=== Qualifying draw ===
The results from qualifying are shown below. Players in bold denote match winners.

**Round 1** Best of 11 frames
65	**Mitchell Mann (ENG)**	**6**
Paul Davison (ENG)	2
96	**Lukas Kleckers (GER)**	**w/o**
Sydney Wilson (ENG)	w/d
80	Billy Joe Castle (ENG)	5
**Rory McLeod (ENG)**	**6**
81	**Barry Pinches (ENG)**	**6**
Dean Young (SCO)	0
88	**Peter Lines (ENG)**	**6**
Connor Benzey (ENG)	1
73	**Gerard Greene (NIR)**	**6**
Brian Ochoiski (FRA)	1
89	**Fraser Patrick (SCO)**	**6**
Sean Maddocks (ENG)	1
72	**Thor Chuan Leong (MAS)**	**6**
Iulian Boiko (UKR)	3
69	**Hammad Miah (ENG)**	**6**
Florian Nüßle (AUT)	5
92	**Amine Amiri (MAR)**	**w/o**
Hamza Akbar (PAK)	w/d
76	Igor Figueiredo (BRA)	5
**Ian Preece (WAL)**	**6**
85	**Simon Lichtenberg (GER)**	**6**
Adam Duffy (ENG)	2
84	Brandon Sargeant (ENG)	2
**Jake Nicholson (ENG)**	**6**
77	James Cahill (ENG)	2
**Ben Mertens (BEL)**	**6**
93	**Alex Borg (MLT)**	**6**
Patrick Whelan (ENG)	4
68	**Fan Zhengyi (CHN)**	**6**
Dylan Emery (WAL)	4
67	**Chen Feilong (CHN)**	**6**
Aaron Hill (IRL)	2
94	Riley Parsons (ENG)	1
**Hayden Staniland (ENG)**	**6**
78	**Kacper Filipiak (POL)**	**6**
Andrew Pagett (WAL)	3
83	David Lilley (ENG)	4
**Antoni Kowalski (POL)**	**6**
86	**Jamie O'Neill (ENG)**	**6**
Oliver Brown (ENG)	5
75	**Eden Sharav (ISR)**	**6**
Daniel Womersley (ENG)	3
91	**Andy Hicks (ENG)**	**6**
Reanne Evans (ENG)	3
70	**Jackson Page (WAL)**	**6**
Chae Ross (ENG)	3
71	Si Jiahui (CHN)	2
**Ross Muir (SCO)**	**6**
90	**Jimmy White (ENG)**	**6**
Ivan Kakovskii (RUS)	3
74	Soheil Vahedi (IRN)	1
**Allan Taylor (ENG)**	**6**
87	**Duane Jones (WAL)**	**6**
Christopher Keogan (ENG)	1
82	**Rod Lawler (ENG)**	**6**
Ross Bulman (IRL)	5
79	Adam Stefanow (POL)	5
**Tyler Rees (WAL)**	**6**
95	Ashley Hugill (ENG)	4
**Wu Yize (CHN)**	**6**
66	**Kishan Hirani (WAL)**	**6**
Robin Hull (FIN)	5

**Round 2** Best of 11 frames
64	**Jamie Clarke (WAL)**	**6**
65	Mitchell Mann (ENG)	1
33	**Sunny Akani (THA)**	**6**
96	Lukas Kleckers (GER)	2
49	**Jordan Brown (NIR)**	**6**
Rory McLeod (ENG)	1
48	Craig Steadman (ENG)	5
81	**Barry Pinches (ENG)**	**6**
41	**Luo Honghao (CHN)**	**6**
88	Peter Lines (ENG)	5
56	Oliver Lines (ENG)	2
73	**Gerard Greene (NIR)**	**6**
40	**Ken Doherty (IRL)**	**6**
89	Fraser Patrick (SCO)	4
57	**Ian Burns (ENG)**	**6**
72	Thor Chuan Leong (MAS)	2
60	**David Grace (ENG)**	**6**
69	Hammad Miah (ENG)	1
37	**Martin Gould (ENG)**	**6**
92	Amine Amiri (MAR)	0
53	John Astley (ENG)	5
**Ian Preece (WAL)**	**6**
44	**Mark Joyce (ENG)**	**6**
85	Simon Lichtenberg (GER)	3
45	**Jak Jones (WAL)**	**6**
Jake Nicholson (ENG)	2
52	**Sam Baird (ENG)**	**6**
Ben Mertens (BEL)	4
36	**Liam Highfield (ENG)**	**6**
93	Alex Borg (MLT)	1
61	**Dominic Dale (WAL)**	**6**
68	Fan Zhengyi (CHN)	4
62	**Alexander Ursenbacher (SUI)**	**6**
67	Chen Feilong (CHN)	1
35	**Andrew Higginson (ENG)**	**6**
Hayden Staniland (ENG)	0
51	**Mike Dunn (ENG)**	**6**
78	Kacper Filipiak (POL)	5
46	**Elliot Slessor (ENG)**	**6**
Antoni Kowalski (POL)	2
43	**Michael White (WAL)**	**6**
86	Jamie O'Neill (ENG)	5
54	Nigel Bond (ENG)	3
75	**Eden Sharav (ISR)**	**6**
38	**Sam Craigie (ENG)**	**6**
91	Andy Hicks (ENG)	0
59	Harvey Chandler (ENG)	2
70	**Jackson Page (WAL)**	**6**
58	**Ashley Carty (ENG)**	**6**
Ross Muir (SCO)	4
39	Michael Georgiou (CYP)	4
90	**Jimmy White (ENG)**	**6**
55	Lee Walker (WAL)	1
**Allan Taylor (ENG)**	**6**
42	**Joe O'Connor (ENG)**	**6**
87	Duane Jones (WAL)	3
47	**Fergal O'Brien (IRL)**	**6**
82	Rod Lawler (ENG)	3
50	**Alfie Burden (ENG)**	**6**
Tyler Rees (WAL)	3
34	Robbie Williams (ENG)	4
**Wu Yize (CHN)**	**6**
63	**Louis Heathcote (ENG)**	**6**
66	Kishan Hirani (WAL)	3

**Round 3** Best of 11 frames
1	Joe Perry (ENG)	4
64	**Jamie Clarke (WAL)**	**6**
32	Tian Pengfei (CHN)	3
33	**Sunny Akani (THA)**	**6**
16	Hossein Vafaei (IRN)	5
49	**Jordan Brown (NIR)**	**6**
17	**Ryan Day (WAL)**	**6**
81	Barry Pinches (ENG)	4
24	**Stuart Carrington (ENG)**	**6**
41	Luo Honghao (CHN)	4
9	**Tom Ford (ENG)**	**6**
73	Gerard Greene (NIR)	3
25	**Mark King (ENG)**	**6**
40	Ken Doherty (IRL)	3
8	Michael Holt (ENG)	3
57	**Ian Burns (ENG)**	**6**
5	**Graeme Dott (SCO)**	**6**
60	David Grace (ENG)	0
28	Chris Wakelin (ENG)	4
37	**Martin Gould (ENG)**	**6**
12	**Matthew Stevens (WAL)**	**6**
Ian Preece (WAL)	4
21	**Ricky Walden (ENG)**	**6**
44	Mark Joyce (ENG)	3
20	**Anthony McGill (SCO)**	**6**
45	Jak Jones (WAL)	1
13	Mark Davis (ENG)	4
52	**Sam Baird (ENG)**	**6**
29	Lu Ning (CHN)	5
36	**Liam Highfield (ENG)**	**6**
4	**Thepchaiya Un-Nooh (THA)**	**6**
61	Dominic Dale (WAL)	1
3	Gary Wilson (ENG)	3
62	**Alexander Ursenbacher (SUI)**	**6**
30	Daniel Wells (WAL)	5
35	**Andrew Higginson (ENG)**	**6**
14	**Martin O'Donnell (ENG)**	**6**
51	Mike Dunn (ENG)	4
19	Ben Woollaston (ENG)	1
46	**Elliot Slessor (ENG)**	**6**
22	**Noppon Saengkham (THA)**	**6**
43	Michael White (WAL)	4
11	Lyu Haotian (CHN)	2
75	**Eden Sharav (ISR)**	**6**
27	**Anthony Hamilton (ENG)**	**6**
38	Sam Craigie (ENG)	3
6	**Scott Donaldson (SCO)**	**6**
70	Jackson Page (WAL)	3
7	Jimmy Robertson (ENG)	4
58	**Ashley Carty (ENG)**	**6**
26	**Robert Milkins (ENG)**	**6**
90	Jimmy White (ENG)	1
10	**Matthew Selt (ENG)**	**6**
Allan Taylor (ENG)	3
23	**Kurt Maflin (NOR)**	**6**
42	Joe O'Connor (ENG)	5
18	Luca Brecel (BEL)	5
47	**Fergal O'Brien (IRL)**	**6**
15	**Liang Wenbo (CHN)**	**6**
50	Alfie Burden (ENG)	2
31	**Alan McManus (SCO)**	**6**
Wu Yize (CHN)	3
2	Ali Carter (ENG)	3
63	**Louis Heathcote (ENG)**	**6**

**Round 4** Best of 19 frames
64	**Jamie Clarke (WAL)**	**10**
33	Sunny Akani (THA)	7
49	**Jordan Brown (NIR)**	**10**
17	Ryan Day (WAL)	6
24	Stuart Carrington (ENG)	8
9	**Tom Ford (ENG)**	**10**
25	**Mark King (ENG)**	**10**
57	Ian Burns (ENG)	6
5	Graeme Dott (SCO)	6
37	**Martin Gould (ENG)**	**10**
12	**Matthew Stevens (WAL)**	**10**
21	Ricky Walden (ENG)	5
20	**Anthony McGill (SCO)**	**10**
52	Sam Baird (ENG)	1
36	Liam Highfield (ENG)	7
4	**Thepchaiya Un-Nooh (THA)**	**10**
62	**Alexander Ursenbacher (SUI)**	**10**
35	Andrew Higginson (ENG)	8
14	Martin O'Donnell (ENG)	3
46	**Elliot Slessor (ENG)**	**10**
22	**Noppon Saengkham (THA)**	**10**
75	Eden Sharav (ISR)	2
27	**Anthony Hamilton (ENG)**	**10**
6	Scott Donaldson (SCO)	5
58	**Ashley Carty (ENG)**	**10**
26	Robert Milkins (ENG)	8
10	Matthew Selt (ENG)	1
23	**Kurt Maflin (NOR)**	**10**
47	Fergal O'Brien (IRL)	9
15	**Liang Wenbo (CHN)**	**10**
31	**Alan McManus (SCO)**	**10**
63	Louis Heathcote (ENG)	5

== Century breaks ==
=== Main stage centuries ===
A total of 79 century breaks were made by 27 players during the main stage of the 2020 World Snooker Championship. The highest was a maximum break by John Higgins.

- 147, 101 – John Higgins
- 140, 132, 122, 105 – Neil Robertson
- 140 – Tom Ford
- 138, 133, 117, 115, 114, 112, 106, 105, 104, 101, 101, 101 – Ronnie O'Sullivan
- 138 – Matthew Stevens
- 136, 122, 105, 105, 104 – Mark Allen
- 136, 122 – Anthony McGill
- 136 – Jamie Clarke
- 133, 130, 119 – Yan Bingtao
- 131, 127, 104, 100 – Judd Trump
- 131, 102 – David Gilbert
- 130 – Mark Williams
- 129, 103, 103, 103, 100 – Martin Gould
- 125, 119, 118, 104, 101 – Ding Junhui
- 124, 120, 119, 102 – Mark Selby
- 124, 105, 102, 101 – Kurt Maflin
- 123 – Elliot Slessor
- 122, 105 – Noppon Saengkham
- 118 – Ashley Carty
- 117, 111, 104 – Barry Hawkins
- 116, 116, 113, 109, 105, 104, 100, 100 – Kyren Wilson
- 115, 109 – Stuart Bingham
- 113 – Liang Wenbo
- 111 – Mark King
- 107, 102 – Jack Lisowski
- 105 – Alan McManus
- 101 – Shaun Murphy

=== Qualifying stage centuries ===
A total of 51 century breaks were made by 32 players during the qualifying stage of the 2020 World Snooker Championship.

- 145, 134, 120, 112 – Allan Taylor
- 141 – Liang Wenbo
- 141 – Alexander Ursenbacher
- 139, 124 – Robert Milkins
- 134 – Wu Yize
- 133, 111, 101 – Tom Ford
- 133, 105 – Hossein Vafaei
- 133 – Liam Highfield
- 131, 110, 104 – Ricky Walden
- 131, 109 – Anthony Hamilton
- 130, 124, 111, 101 – Elliot Slessor
- 127, 114, 102 – Luca Brecel
- 127, 109 – Jordan Brown
- 127 – Martin Gould
- 125 – Mark King
- 123, 108 – Ryan Day
- 123, 108 – Anthony McGill
- 121 – Michael Georgiou
- 120 – Michael White
- 114, 111 – Barry Pinches
- 112 – Oliver Lines
- 110 – Sam Baird
- 109 – Chen Feilong
- 109 – Craig Steadman
- 104 – Hammad Miah
- 103 – Kurt Maflin
- 102 – Sunny Akani
- 102 – Si Jiahui
- 101 – Aaron Hill
- 101 – Jackson Page
- 100 – Gerard Greene
- 100 – Robbie Williams
