= 1990 World Cup (snooker) =

British Car Rental World Cup
Tournament information
- Dates: 21–24 March 1990
- Venue: Bournemouth International Centre
- City: Bournemouth
- Country: England
- Format: Non-ranking event
- Total prize fund: £135,000
- Winner's share: £48,000
- Highest break: Alain Robidoux (CAN) (124)

Final
- Champion: Canada (CAN)
- Runner-up: Northern Ireland (NIR)
- Score: 9–5

The 1990 Snooker World Cup was a team snooker tournament played at the Bournemouth International Centre. British Car Rental sponsored the tournament, which was the last in the Snooker World Cup series until it was revived in a new format in 1996.

Defending champions England with Steve Davis, Jimmy White and John Parrott lost their first round match to the Republic of Ireland, who then lost to Northern Ireland in the semi-finals. The Northern Ireland team of captain Dennis Taylor, Alex Higgins and Tommy Murphy. A dispute between Higgins and Taylor culminated in Higgins threatening to have Taylor shot; this incident, along with a number of offences at the World Championship a month later, resulted in Higgins being banned from the game for a full season. They went on to lose 5–9 in the final to the Canada team of Cliff Thorburn, Bob Chaperon and Alain Robidoux. Robidoux won the last frame with a 124 break, the highest of the championship.

== Tournament summary ==
=== Background ===
Sine the 1979 World Challenge Cup, a professional team tournament had been run every year except 1984; during the 1984–85 snooker season, the event was moved from early to late in the season. There had previously been an All Ireland Team, which won the tournament from 1985 to 1987. Alex Higgins, Dennis Taylor and Eugene Hughes were the team members for those three years. Later, there had been separate Ireland and Northern Ireland teams, neither of which had won a match at the competition since the change.

The 1990 Snooker World Cup was played at the Bournemouth International Centre from 21 to 24 March 1990, with eight teams participating. British Car Rental sponsored the tournament, which was the last in the Snooker World Cup series until it was revived in a new format in 1996.

Prize fund Prize money was awarded as follows:

- Winners: £48,000
- Runners-up: £30,000
- Losing semi-finalists: £15,000
- First round losers: £9,000
- Highest break:£6,000

=== Teams ===
The participating teams for 1990 were:

Team	Player 1 (Captain)	Player 2	Player 3
England	Steve Davis	Jimmy White	John Parrott
Wales	Terry Griffiths	Doug Mountjoy	Cliff Wilson
Canada	Cliff Thorburn	Bob Chaperon	Alain Robidoux
Rest of the World	Silvino Francisco (RSA)	Tony Drago (MLT)	Dene O'Kane (NZL)
Northern Ireland	Dennis Taylor	Alex Higgins	Tommy Murphy
Scotland	Stephen Hendry	Murdo MacLeod	John Rea
Australia	Eddie Charlton	John Campbell	Warren King
Ireland	Eugene Hughes	Paddy Browne	Anthony Kearney

=== First round ===
Defending champions England led Ireland 4–1 but were defeated 4–5. Steve Davis and Anthony Kearney each won a frame when they played each other, then Jimmy White won both frames against Paddy Browne. Parrott won the next frame, against Hughes, and had a 58–4 points advantage in the sixth frame, which Hughes went on to win. Hughes and Parrott played the following two frames, which were both taken by Hughes. In the deciding frame, Browne defeated Davis. The match between Canada and Scotland was level after each of the first three pair of frames, as Bob Chaperon and John Rea, Cliff Thorburn and Murdo MacLeod, and Alain Robidoux and Stephen Hendry all drew 1–1. Robidoux won the next two frames, against Hendry, to secure a 5–3 win.

Higgins won three consecutive frames against Tony Drago to move Northern Ireland Team from 2–2 against the Rest of the World to a 5–2 win. Taylor and Silvino Francisco each won a frame in the opening pairing, and then Tommy Murphy and Dene O'Kane each took a frame when they played.

=== Semi-finals ===
Canada eliminated Australia 5–1 in the first semi-final, with only King, against Thorburn, winning a frame for Australia. Taylor gave Northern Ireland a 2–0 lead by defeating Browne, making the highest break of the tournament so far, 71, in the second frame. After Hughes had equalised, Higgins defeated Kearney 2–0 and then won the deciding frame against Hughes, to complete a 5–4 victory.

=== Final ===
Canada defeated Northern Ireland 9–5 to win the title. Robidoux won five frames of the six he played, and concluded the match with a total clearance of 124, the highest break of the tournament, in the 14th frame. At previous tournaments, Higgins had insisted that any of the team members winning the highest break prize should keep it for themselves rather than divide it between the team members. Taylor had recorded the highest break in the 1990 tournament to that point, a 71. Higgins was angered by Taylor's insistence that he would keep the £6,000 highest break prize for himself if he won it. At the press conference Higgins said "In my estimation, Dennis Taylor is not a snooker person. He is a money person . . . He put money before country. He belongs back in Coalisland. He's not fit to wear this badge, the red hand of Ulster." Backstage during the match, Higgins threatened Taylor that he would arrange for him to be shot the next time that Taylor was back in Northern Ireland. The presentation of the prizes to the Canadian team was interrupted by a streaker protesting against the poll tax whilst wearing only two blue balloons.

== Main draw ==
Results for the tournament are shown below.

Quarter-finals; Best of 9 Frames
England	4
Republic of Ireland	5
Northern Ireland	5
Rest of the World	2
Wales	3
Australia	5
Canada	5
Scotland	3

Semi-finals; Best of 9 Frames
Republic of Ireland	2
Northern Ireland	5
Australia	1
Canada	5

Final; Best of 17 Frames
Northern Ireland	5
Canada	9

== Final ==
Final: Best of 17 frames. Bournemouth International Centre, Bournemouth, England. 24 March 1990. Frame-winning scores are shown in bold, and breaks over 50 are shown in parentheses after frame scores.
**Canada**; Cliff Thorburn, Bob Chaperon, Alain Robidoux	**9**–5	Northern Ireland; Dennis Taylor, Alex Higgins, Tommy Murphy
Chaperon v Taylor: 1–1 (**72**–40, 57–**62**); Thorburn v Murphy: 2–0 (**48**–36, **74**–10); Robidoux v Higgins: 1–1 (57–**71** (56), **96**–17); Robidoux v Higgins: 2–0 (**68**–27, **74**–43); Chaperon v Taylor: 1–1 (59–**67**, **74**–37); Thorburn v Higgins: 0–2 (0–**85** (55), 48–**56**); Robidoux v Murphy: 2–0 (**44**–32, **124** (124)–0)
124 (Robidoux)	Highest break	56 (Higgins)
1	Century breaks	0
0	50+ breaks	2 (both by Higgins)
