= 2019 World Cup (snooker) =

Snooker team event, June 2019

Tournament information
- Dates: 24–30 June 2019
- Venue: Wuxi City Sports Park Stadium
- City: Wuxi
- Country: China
- Organisation: WPBSA
- Format: Non-ranking team event
- Total prize fund: $800,000
- Winner's share: $200,000
- Highest break: China Liang Wenbo (138)

Final
- Champion: Scotland; John Higgins; Stephen Maguire
- Runner-up: China B Zhou Yuelong; Liang Wenbo
- Score: 4–0

The 2019 Beverly World Cup was a professional non-ranking snooker tournament that took place from 24 to 30 June 2019 at the Wuxi City Sports Park Stadium in Wuxi, China. Hosted by the World Professional Billiards and Snooker Association (WPBSA), it was the first event of the 2019–20 snooker season and the 16th edition of the World Cup. The event featured 16 teams of 2 players representing national teams.

The Chinese team of Liang Wenbo and Ding Junhui were the defending champions, having won the 2017 event defeating the English team of Barry Hawkins and Judd Trump 4–3 in the final. Ding and Liang were on different teams for the event, due to China having two sides as hosts. The China B team of Liang and Zhou Yuelong reached the final of the event, where they met the Scotland team of John Higgins and Stephen Maguire. Higgins and Maguire won the event winning the final 4–0. This was the first win in the World Cup for Scotland since the 1996 World Cup. Liang also had the highest break of the event, a 138 in the group stage match against Switzerland.

== Tournament overview ==
=== Format ===
The 2019 World Cup was a professional snooker tournament for national pairs. The defending champions were the Chinese team of Liang Wenbo and Ding Junhui. The tournament used the same format as that used in 2017 World Cup. The tournament consisted of 24 national teams, with two players competing for each side. The World cup was split into a group stage and a knockout stage. The 24 teams were split into four groups of six teams. The group stages consisted of matches played as best-of-five-frames with four frames of singles, and a frame of doubles. The top two teams from each group advanced to the Knockout Stages, the order being determined by total frames won. If there is a tie in either of the first two places the following rules determine the positions:

- If two teams are equal on frames won, the winner of the match between the two teams will be ranked higher.
- If three or more teams are tied, a sudden-death blue ball shoot-out will be played.
- Teams tied for position 3 to 6 would remain tied and share the prize money for those positions.

During the knockout stage, matches were played as best-of-seven-frames. The knockout matches were scheduled as four singles matches and two doubles matches with the final frame being a singles match, with participants nominated by each team.

=== Prize fund ===
The total prize fund for the event totalled $800,000, with the winning team receiving $200,000.

- Winner: $200,000
- Runner-Up: $100,000
- Semi-final: $60,000
- Quarter-final: $40,000
- Third in group: $22,500
- Fourth in group: $15,000
- Fifth in group: $10,000
- Sixth in group: $7,500
- Total: $800,000

=== Participants ===
The tournament was made up of 24 pairs of players representing individual nations. China, who had won the event in both the last three events, in 2017 and 2015 and 2011 were allocated two places due to being hosts. Below is the list of teams and players participating.

Seed	Nation	Player 1	Player 2
1	China A	Ding Junhui	Yan Bingtao
2	Wales	Mark Williams	Ryan Day
3	Scotland	John Higgins	Stephen Maguire
4	Northern Ireland	Mark Allen	Jordan Brown
5	England	Kyren Wilson	Jack Lisowski
6	Belgium	Luca Brecel	Ben Mertens
7	China B	Zhou Yuelong	Liang Wenbo
8	Thailand	Thepchaiya Un-Nooh	Noppon Saengkham
9	Iran	Hossein Vafaei	Soheil Vahedi
10	Cyprus	Michael Georgiou	Antonis Poullos
11	Norway	Kurt Maflin	Christopher Watts
12	Ireland	Ken Doherty	Fergal O'Brien
13	Malaysia	Thor Chuan Leong	Moh Keen Hoo
14	Poland	Adam Stefanow	Kacper Filipiak
15	Hong Kong	Andy Lee	Cheung Ka Wai
16	Germany	Simon Lichtenberg	Lukas Kleckers
17	Israel	Eden Sharav	Shachar Ruberg
18	Australia	Steve Mifsud	Ryan Thomerson
19	Saudi Arabia	Omar Alajlani	Ahmed Aseeri
20	Switzerland	Alexander Ursenbacher	Luis Vetter
21	Malta	Alex Borg	Brian Cini
22	India	Himanshu Dinesh Jain	Lucky Vatnani
23	Austria	Andreas Ploner	Florian Nüßle
24	United Arab Emirates	Mohammed Shehab	Mohammed Al Joaker

== Summary ==
=== Group stage ===
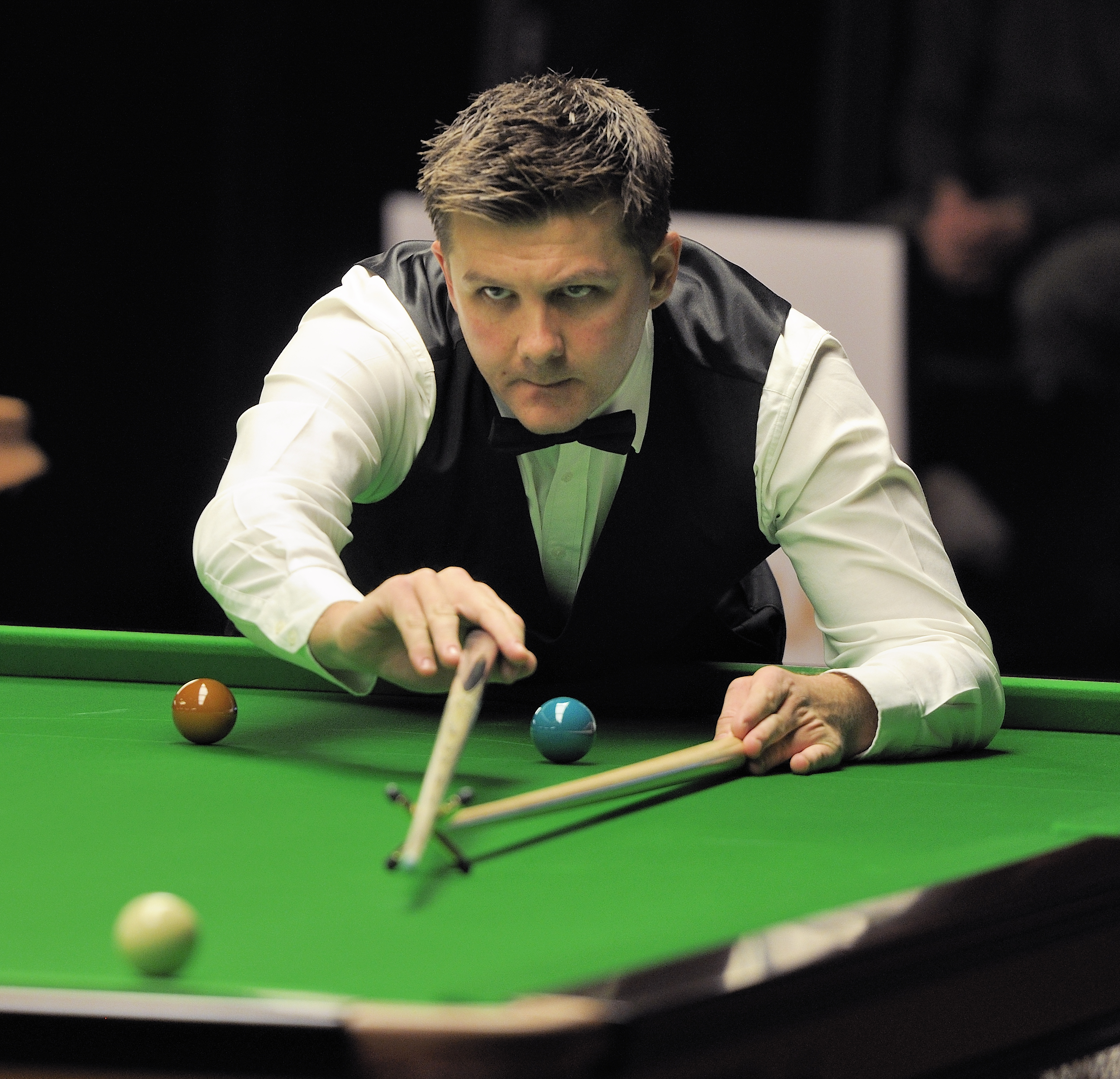
Ryan Day alongside Mark Williams lost just four frames in the group stage

The group stages for the event was played from 24 to 28 June 2019. Group A featured defending champions Ding Junhui and Yan Bingtao representing China A, who won four of their five matches. The pair lost one match to the Thailand team of Thepchaiya Un-Nooh and Noppon Saengkham. The Chinese pair finished the group as the leaders, winning 19 of the 25 total frames. In second, the Thailand team had 15 frames won ahead of Norway and Poland with 11. England won all four of five their matches in group B 3–2 to win the group with 17 frames. In the final match of the group, Iran and Hong Kong met with the winner progressing. The Hong Kong pair of Andy Lee and Cheung Ka Wai won the match 3–2 to progress.

Both the Belgian team of Luca Brecel and Ben Mertens and the Scottish team of John Higgins and Stephen Maguire were assured of progressing to the quarter-finals after winning their first four matches in group C. In the dead rubber match, Belgium won 3–2 to top the group on head-to-head record. They both finished eight points ahead of the Israeli team in third. In group D, the Welsh team of Mark Williams and Ryan Day won the most frames of any team during the group stage, completing a whitewash over Switzerland and dropping a single frame in the other four matches. They qualified ahead of China B who completed three whitewashes of their own.

=== Knockout stage ===
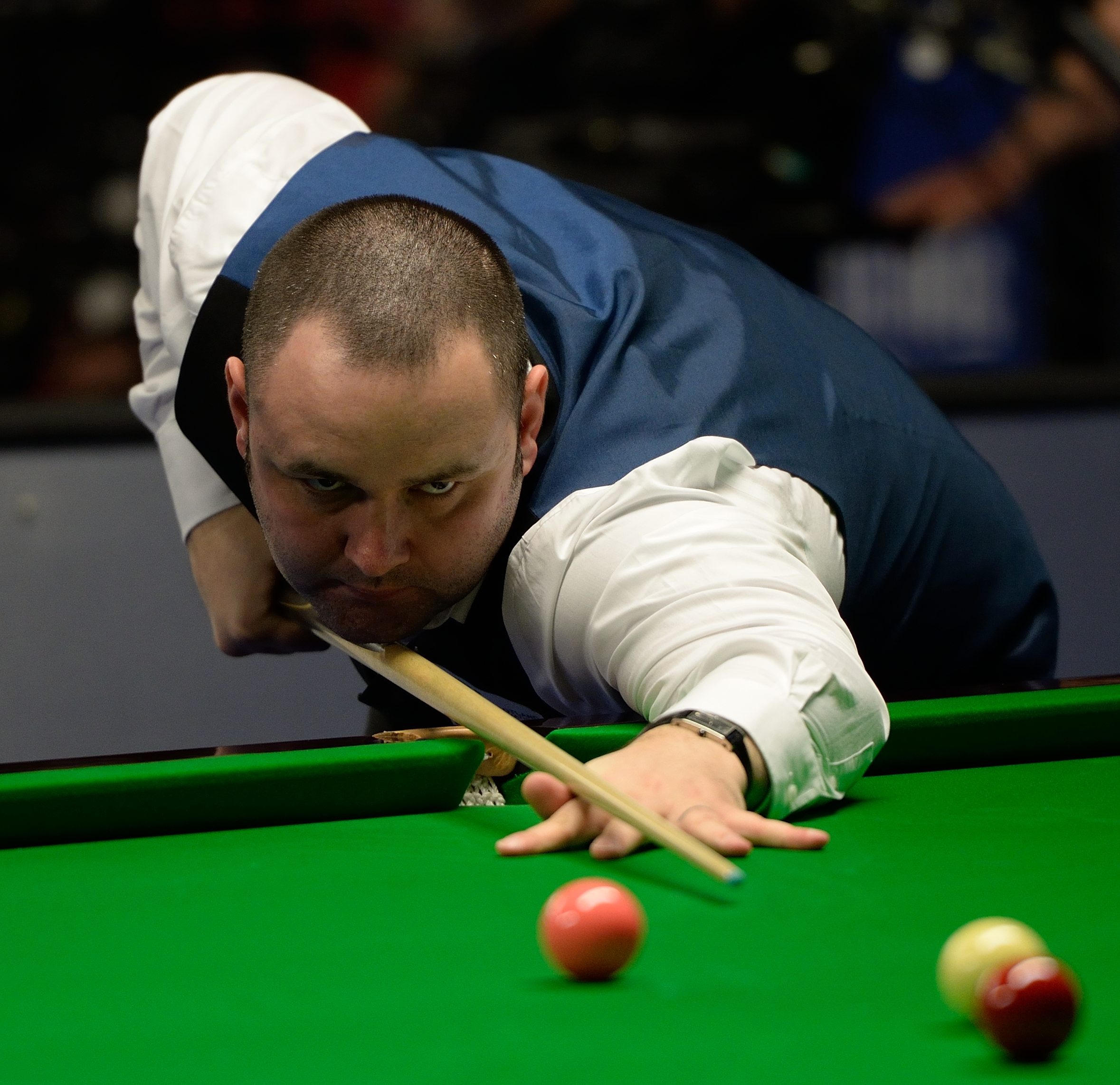
Stephen Maguire (pictured) with John Higgins won the event representing Scotland

The quarter-finals of the tournament were held 29 June, as the first to four frames. The China A team won their match with Hong Kong 4–0, whilst China B defeated Belgium 4–2. Scotland made an early 3–1 lead over Wales, but Williams won frame five and Wales won a doubles frame to force a deciding frame. Maguire won the frame with a break of 59 over Day. England and Thailand also went to a deciding frame, despite Noppon Saengkham missing frame ball in the sixth to win the match, with Wilson then getting a fluke. In the decider, Jack Lisowski beat Thepchaiya Un-Nooh to win the match 4–3.

The semi-finals and final were both played on 30 June. Defending champions China A were defeated by Scotland 1–4, whilst the China B side defeated England on a deciding frame 4–3. The final was played between Maguire and Higgins representing Scotland and Zhou Yuelong and Liang Wenbo representing China B and was refereed by Jan Scheers. The Scotland team took the match by winning the first four frames, with neither team making a break of above 50. This was Scotland's first win at the event since the 1996 World Cup also won by Higgins alongside Stephen Hendry and Alan McManus. After the final, Maguire commented that he had "never felt nerves like that in any professional match" due to representing a team rather as a singles competitor.

== Results ==
The following is the results from the event. Teams listed in bold denote match winners.

=== Group A ===
Date	Team 1	Score	Team 2	Team 1	Score	Team 2	Team 1	Score	Team 2
24 June 2019	**China A**	**4**–1	Germany	Thailand	2–**3**	**Norway**	Poland	2–**3**	**Austria**
25 June 2019	**China A**	**4**–1	Norway	**Thailand**	**3**–2	Austria	**Poland**	**3**–2	Germany
26 June 2019	**China A**	**4**–1	Austria	**Thailand**	**3**–2	Poland	Norway	2–**3**	Germany
27 June 2019	**China A**	**5**–0	Poland	**Thailand**	**4**–1	Germany	Austria	1–**4**	**Norway**
28 June 2019	China A	2–**3**	**Thailand**	**Poland**	**4**–1	Norway	**Austria**	**3**–2	Germany

Place	Seed	Team	Games	Frames	Frames won	Frames lost	Difference	Points
1	1	**China A**	5	25	19	6	+13	19
2	8	**Thailand**	5	25	15	10	+5	15
3	11	Norway	5	25	11	14	−3	11
3	14	Poland	5	25	11	14	−3	11
5	23	Austria	5	25	10	15	−5	10
6	16	Germany	5	25	9	16	−7	9

=== Group B ===
Date	Team 1	Score	Team 2	Team 1	Score	Team 2	Team 1	Score	Team 2
24 June 2019	**Northern Ireland**	**4**–1	Saudi Arabia	**England**	**3**–2	Hong Kong	**Iran**	**3**–2	Ireland
25 June 2019	**Northern Ireland**	**3**–2	Hong Kong	**England**	**3**–2	Ireland	Iran	2–**3**	**Saudi Arabia**
26 June 2019	Northern Ireland	1–**4**	**Ireland**	**England**	**3**–2	Iran	**Hong Kong**	**4**–1	Saudi Arabia
27 June 2019	Northern Ireland	1–**4**	**Iran**	**England**	**5**–0	Saudi Arabia	Ireland	1–**4**	**Hong Kong**
28 June 2019	Northern Ireland	2–**3**	**England**	Iran	2–**3**	**Hong Kong**	**Ireland**	**3**–2	Saudi Arabia

Place	Seed	Team	Games	Frames	Frames won	Frames lost	Difference	Points
1	5	**England**	5	25	17	8	+9	17
2	15	**Hong Kong**	5	25	15	10	+5	15
3	9	Iran	5	25	13	12	+1	13
4	12	Ireland	5	25	12	13	−1	12
5	4	Northern Ireland	5	25	11	14	−3	11
6	19	Saudi Arabia	5	25	7	18	−11	7

=== Group C ===
Date	Team 1	Score	Team 2	Team 1	Score	Team 2	Team 1	Score	Team 2
24 June 2019	**Scotland**	**4**–1	Cyprus	**Belgium**	**4**–1	United Arab Emirates	Malaysia	1–**4**	**Israel**
25 June 2019	**Scotland**	**4**–1	United Arab Emirates	**Belgium**	**4**–1	Israel	**Malaysia**	**3**–2	Cyprus
26 June 2019	**Scotland**	**5**–0	Israel	**Belgium**	**4**–1	Malaysia	**United Arab Emirates**	**3**–2	Cyprus
27 June 2019	**Scotland**	**4**–1	Malaysia	**Belgium**	**4**–1	Cyprus	**Israel**	**4**–1	United Arab Emirates
28 June 2019	Scotland	2–**3**	**Belgium**	Malaysia	2–**3**	**United Arab Emirates**	Israel	2–**3**	**Cyprus**

Place	Seed	Team	Games	Frames	Frames won	Frames lost	Difference	Points
1	6	**Belgium**	5	25	19	6	+13	19
2	3	**Scotland**	5	25	19	6	+13	19
3	17	Israel	5	25	11	14	−3	11
4	10	Cyprus	5	25	9	17	−8	9
4	24	United Arab Emirates	5	25	9	17	−8	9
6	13	Malaysia	5	25	8	18	−10	8

=== Group D ===
Date	Team 1	Score	Team 2	Team 1	Score	Team 2	Team 1	Score	Team 2
24 June 2019	**Wales**	**4**–1	India	**China B**	**5**–0	Australia	**Switzerland**	**3**–2	Malta
25 June 2019	**Wales**	**4**–1	Australia	**China B**	**3**–2	Malta	**Switzerland**	**3**–2	India
26 June 2019	**Wales**	**4**–1	Malta	**China B**	**5**–0	Switzerland	Australia	2–**3**	**India**
27 June 2019	**Wales**	**5**–0	Switzerland	**China B**	**5**–0	India	**Malta**	**3**–2	Australia
28 June 2019	**Wales**	**4**–1	China B	Switzerland	2–**3**	**Australia**	Malta	1–**4**	**India**

Place	Seed	Team	Games	Frames	Frames won	Frames lost	Difference	Points
1	2	**Wales**	5	25	21	4	+17	21
2	7	**China B**	5	25	19	6	+13	19
3	22	India	5	25	10	15	−6	10
4	21	Malta	5	25	9	15	−6	9
5	20	Switzerland	5	25	8	17	−9	8
5	18	Australia	5	25	8	17	−9	8

=== Knockout stage ===
**Quarter-finals**; Best of 7 frames (29 June 2019)
A1	**China A (1)**	**4**
B2	Hong Kong (15)	0
D1	Wales (2)	3
C2	**Scotland (3)**	**4**
B1	**England (5)**	**4**
A2	Thailand (8)	3
C1	Belgium (6)	2
D2	**China B (7)**	**4**

**Semi-finals**; Best of 7 frames (30 June 2019)
A1	China A (1)	1
C2	**Scotland (3)**	**4**
B1	England (5)	3
D2	**China B (7)**	**4**

**Final**; Best of 7 frames (30 June 2019)
C2	**Scotland (3)**	**4**
D2	China B (7)	0

=== Final ===
Final: Best of 7 frames. Referee: Jan Scheers; Wuxi City Sports Park Stadium, Wuxi, China, 30 June 2019.
**John Higgins**; **Stephen Maguire**; **Scotland (3)**	**4**–0	Zhou Yuelong; Liang Wenbo; China B (7)
**58**–38, **71**–0, **60**–45, **55**–33
45	Highest break	45
0	Century breaks	0
0	50+ breaks	0

== Century breaks ==
There were a total of 17 century breaks made in the tournament. The highest break was made by China B's Liang Wenbo in the third frame of the group stage match against Switzerland. Below is a list of centuries made during the tournament, along with the team they were representing.

- China B – 138 Liang Wenbo
- Wales – 134 Ryan Day; 127, 110, 101 Mark Williams
- Thailand – 133, 115 Noppon Saengkham
- China A – 123 Yan Bingtao; 104, 103 Ding Junhui
- Scotland – 117 Stephen Maguire
- Northern Ireland – 116, 113 Mark Allen
- Malta – 112 Brian Cini
- Iran – 105 Hossein Vafaei
- England – 104 Jack Lisowski
- Hong Kong – 104 Cheung Ka Wai
