= 1992 World Snooker Championship =

Professional snooker tournament

1992 Embassy World Snooker Championship
Tournament information
- Dates: 18 April – 4 May 1992
- Venue: Crucible Theatre
- City: Sheffield
- Country: England
- Organisation: WPBSA
- Format: Ranking event
- Total prize fund: £850,000
- Winner's share: £150,000
- Highest break: Jimmy White (ENG) (147)

Final
- Champion: Stephen Hendry (SCO)
- Runner-up: Jimmy White (ENG)
- Score: 18–14

The 1992 World Snooker Championship (also referred to as the 1992 Embassy World Snooker Championship for sponsorship reasons) was a professional ranking snooker tournament that took place between 18 April and 4 May 1992 at the Crucible Theatre in Sheffield, England. Organised by the World Professional Billiards and Snooker Association, it was the tenth and final ranking event of the 1991–92 snooker season and the sixteenth consecutive World Snooker Championship to be held at the Crucible since the tournament moved to the venue in 1977. Broadcast in the United Kingdom by BBC Television, the tournament was sponsored by the Embassy cigarette brand. The winner received £150,000 from the total prize fund of £850,000.

Nine rounds of qualifying for the championship were held. The pre-qualifying competition, which had four rounds with matches played as the best of 11 frames, started on 22 May 1991 at three snooker clubs: Frames Plaza in Sheffield, Spencers in Bolton, and the Royal Hampshire Snooker Lodge in Aldershot. The main qualifying stage was held at Preston Guild Hall from 18 to 29 March 1992. The 16 successful qualifiers joined the 16 seeded players at the main stage at the Crucible. Debutants at the main stage that year were Nigel Bond, Peter Ebdon, Jason Ferguson, Mark Johnston-Allen, Stephen Murphy, Mick Price, Chris Small, and James Wattana.

John Parrott was the defending champion, having defeated Jimmy White 18–11 in the final of the previous year's tournament to win his maiden world title. Parrott lost 12–13 to Alan McManus in the quarter-finals, becoming the seventh first-time winner at the Crucible who failed to defend the title, a phenomenon known as the Crucible curse. While playing Tony Drago in the first round, White made the second maximum break in a World Championship match, nine years after Cliff Thorburn made the first in 1983. In addition to the £14,000 highest break prize, White received £100,000 for making a televised maximum at the Crucible. White advanced to the final, where he faced Stephen Hendry. White led 12–6 and 14–8, but Hendry then won 10 successive frames to secure his second World Championship title. It was White's fourth defeat in a World Championship final and his second by Hendry.

== Overview ==
The World Snooker Championship is an annual professional snooker tournament organised by the World Professional Billiards and Snooker Association (WPBSA). Founded in the late 19th century by British Army soldiers stationed in India, the cue sport was popular in the British Isles. However, in the modern era, which started in 1969 when the World Championship reverted to a knockout format, it has become increasingly popular worldwide, especially in East and Southeast Asian nations such as China, Hong Kong and Thailand.

Joe Davis won the first World Championship in 1927, hosted by the Billiards Association and Control Council, the final match being held at Camkin's Hall in Birmingham, England. The 1992 championship featured 32 professional players competing in one-on-one snooker matches in a single-elimination format, each round being played over a pre-determined number of frames, and each match divided into two or more sessions containing a set number of frames. These competitors in the main tournament were selected using a combination of the top players in the snooker world rankings and the winners of a pre-tournament qualification stage. The top 16 players in the world rankings automatically qualified for the event, the remaining 16 players coming through the qualification rounds. It was the tenth and final ranking event of the 1991–92 snooker season, and the sixteenth consecutive World Snooker Championship to be held at the Crucible, the first tournament there having taken place in 1977. The defending champion in 1992 was John Parrott, who had defeated Jimmy White 18–11 in the final of the 1991 World Snooker Championship. The tournament was sponsored by cigarette brand Embassy, and was also referred to as the Embassy World Snooker Championship. The championship was broadcast on BBC Television in the UK.

=== Prize fund ===
The breakdown of prize money for this year is shown below:

- Winner: £150,000
- Runner-up: £90,000
- Semi-final: £45,000
- Quarter-final: £22,500
- Last 16: £12,000
- Last 32: £6,500
- Last 48: £5,000
- Last 64: £3,000
- Last 96: £1,375
- Last 128: £750
- Last 155: £500
- Qualifying stage highest break: £4,000
- Televised stage highest break: £14,000
- Televised stage maximum break: £100,000
- Total: £850,000

== Tournament summary ==
=== Qualifying ===
There were nine rounds matches across the pre-qualifying and qualifying stages. The pre-qualifying competition, which had four rounds with matches played as the best of 11 frames, started on 22 May 1991 at three snooker clubs: Frames Plaza in Sheffield, Spencers in Bolton, and the Royal Hampshire Snooker Lodge in Aldershot. The main qualifying stage was held at Preston Guild Hall from 18 to 29 March 1992. Matches at Preston were the best of 19 frames.

During pre-qualifying, Robert Foxall became the first player to make a century break in their first frame as part of a world championship match, when he compiled a 107 against Mike Colquitt in the first of the rounds. Peter Williams lost 0–6 to Kieran McAlinden; it meant that he had competed in ten pre-qualifying events that season without winning a frame. The highest break of the pre-qualifying phase was 136 by Mike Dunn.

In the first of the rounds after pre-qualifying, eight-time champion Fred Davis lost 1–10 to first-season professional Peter Daubney. On his 43rd birthday, two-time champion Alex Higgins defeated Wayne Murphy 10–3. The 1974 runner-up Graham Miles misread the date of his match against Sean Lynskey and failed to appear, giving Lynskey a walkover. Chris Brooks had died in a car crash earlier in the year, which gave his scheduled opponent Bill Werbeniuk a walkover to the second round, in which Werbeniuk did not turn up to his match against David Taylor. In round two, Higgins defeated Paul Gibson 10–6 after they had been level at 4–4, while Bjørn L'Orange whitewashed three-time champion John Spencer. In the third round, Higgins was 4–5 down to Alan McManus at the end of their first session and lost 7–10 despite having led 6–5. Stephen Murphy compiled three century breaks as he beat Eugene Hughes 10–5. David Taylor lost 5–10 to 1980 champion Cliff Thorburn in a match that lasted more than eight hours.

In the fourth round, Thorburn lost in a match that took eight hours and 50 minutes, 7–10 to Chris Small. Kirk Stevens, twice a world championship semi-finalist, defeated Joe Swail 10–7. James Wattana won the deciding frame against Stevens in their fifth round match. In another fifth round match that went the distance, Mick Price beat 1986 champion Joe Johnson. A break of 141 by Johnson in the third frame was the highest of the qualifying competition. Cliff Wilson, who had forgotten to bring tablets that he took for a heart condition, retired from his match against Peter Ebdon when he was 0–9 behind.

=== First round ===
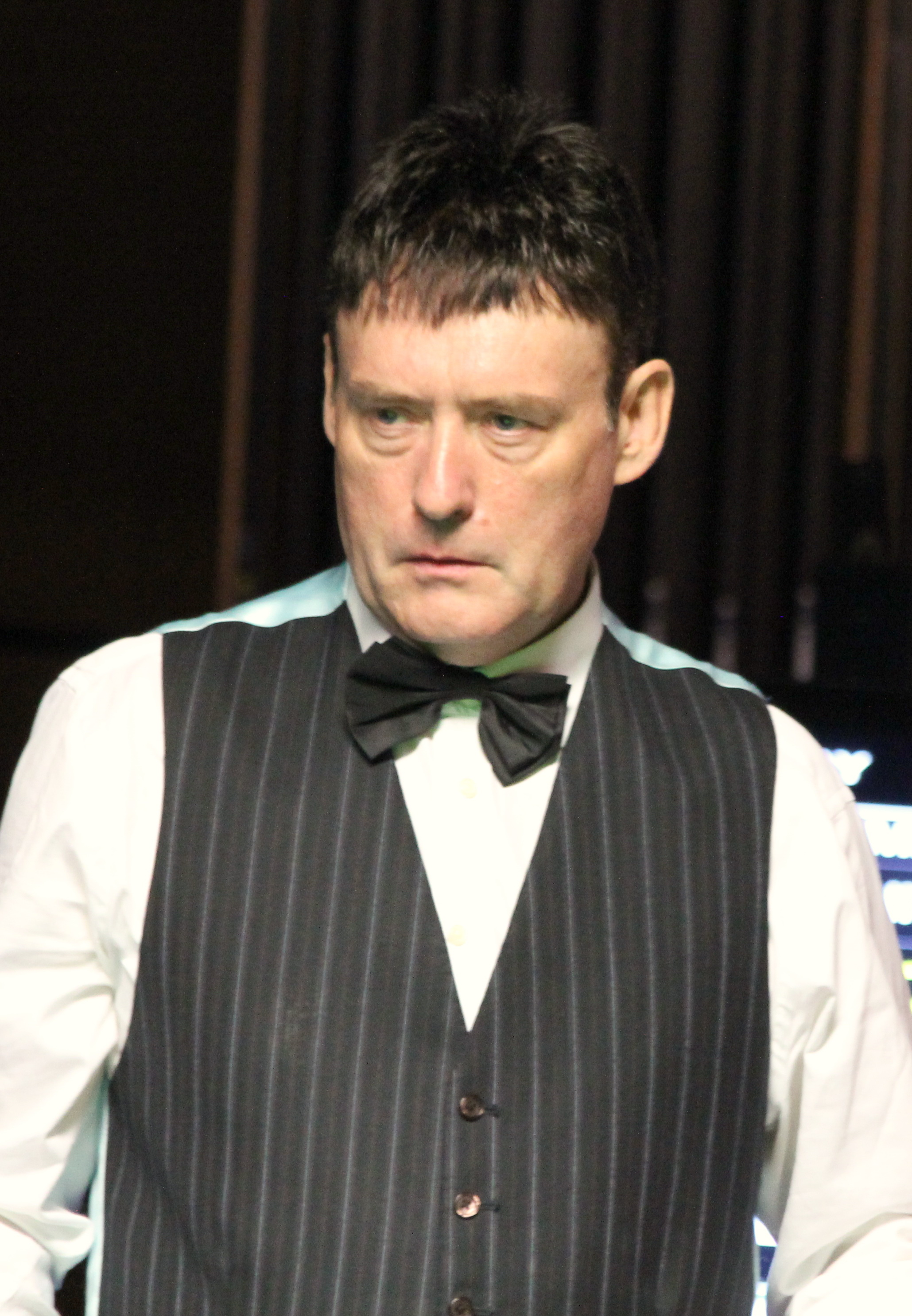
Jimmy White (pictured in 2016) made the second maximum break in the history of the tournament.

The first round took place between 18 and 23 April, each match played over two sessions as the best of 19 frames. Debutants at the Crucible this year were Nigel Bond, Peter Ebdon, Jason Ferguson, Mark Johnston-Allen, Stephen Murphy, Mick Price, Chris Small, and James Wattana. The 10–0 win by defending champion John Parrott over Eddie Charlton in the first round was the first-ever whitewash in Crucible history. There would not be another whitewash until Shaun Murphy's 10–0 defeat of Luo Honghao in 2019. Tony Knowles established a 4–0 lead against Johnston-Allen and despite losing the next three frames, won the match 10–4. Price eliminated 1985 champion Dennis Taylor 10–6. When Taylor was 4–5 behind, referee Len Ganley called five miss shots in succession, which Taylor said afterwards was "the turning point ... There was no way I was trying to miss the red." Mike Hallett lost his place in the top 16 of the rankings as a result of his 8–10 defeat by Alan McManus.

A break of 106 in the 16th frame saw Willie Thorne complete a 10–6 win against Gary Wilkinson. Dean Reynolds's total of 38 points in the eighth frame against Jim Wych was the lowest ever recorded in a frame of professional snooker in which all balls were potted. Reynolds recovered from 3–7 behind to 7–7 but then lost the next three frames. Bond was 2–6 behind against Alain Robidoux but made a 129 break, missing the final black ball from its spot. Robidoux won the match 10–7.

Jimmy White became only the second player ever to compile a maximum break at the Crucible, during his 10–4 first round win over Tony Drago, nine years after Thorburn's maximum in 1983.

Steve Davis's 4–10 defeat to qualifier Ebdon was his first loss in the opening round since 1982. It also ended his nine-year streak of reaching at least the semi-finals of the tournament. Davis led 4–3 but Ebdon won the next seven frames. Martin Clark and Peter Francisco were level at 5–5 and 7-7- before Clark won 10–7. The match between Griffiths and Chaperon over-ran, and required a third session that was played on the other table; Griffiths won 10–8. The first frame between Neal Foulds and Ferguson took 66 minutes, which was only three minutes shorter than the longest ever recorded at the Crucible. Breaks of 132 in frame six and 117 in frame eight helped Foulds to a 6–2 lead at the end of the first session, and he eventually won 10–8 after a third session was required.

Steve James led Dene O'Kane 5–0 but O'Kane recovered to 4–5 at the end of the first session. James went on to lead 9–6, but O'Kane then took four consecutive frames to secure victory. Small, who had won eight matches to emerge from the qualifying tournament, made a break of 110 during the first session against Doug Mountjoy, and having been a frame behind at 4–5, went on to win 10–7. Wattana was 7–2 ahead of Tony Jones after the first session and was still five frames ahead when he won 10–5. Murphy had a 2–1 lead against Stephen Hendry but lost 3–10.

In all, eight of the sixteen seeded players exited the tournament in the first round. This did not happen again until 2012.

=== Second round ===
The second round, which took place between 23 and 27 April, was played as best of 25 frames matches spread over three sessions. Parrott defeated Knowles 13–4. At 4–6 behind, Knowles asked Parrott to replay after the referee Len Ganley had called a miss against Parrott. Ganley inadvertently placed the cue ball in a more favourable position, and Parrott potted the ball he was aiming at. After the match, Knowles said "How could I play after that? My cueing and timing went. Any slight upset, with the concentration involved these days, destroys your chances.

A break of 132 by Price in the 20th frame against McManus saw them level at ten frames each, with McManus then taking the next three frames to win. Wych reached the quarter-finals for the first time since his Crucible debut in 1980. He won eight consecutive frames from 5–6 behind against Thorne. When White and Robidoux were level at 6–6, White accidentally touched the cue ball while lining up a shot, causing a foul, and Robidoux went on to win the frame. The pair were level again at 10–10. White won the next two frames but lost the next of a re-spotted black, before completing a 13–11 victory. White remarked afterward that "I never found my game. I'm playing so well in practice, maybe I got complacent."

Ebdon took nine consecutive frames in building a 12–4 lead against Clark, and added the opening frame of the third session to complete his victory. Snooker journalist Clive Everton wrote of Ebdon that, "No more assured start has been made at the Crucible since Terry Griffiths won the title at his first attempt in 1979." Griffiths won seven of the eight frames in the first session of his match against Foulds. Having led Small 6–2 and 9–7 after the first two sessions, O'Kane won 13–10. Wattana trailed Hendry 6–10 after their second session, but then took four of the next five frames. Hendry won the next two frames to secure his place in the quarter-finals at 13–10.

=== Quarter-finals ===
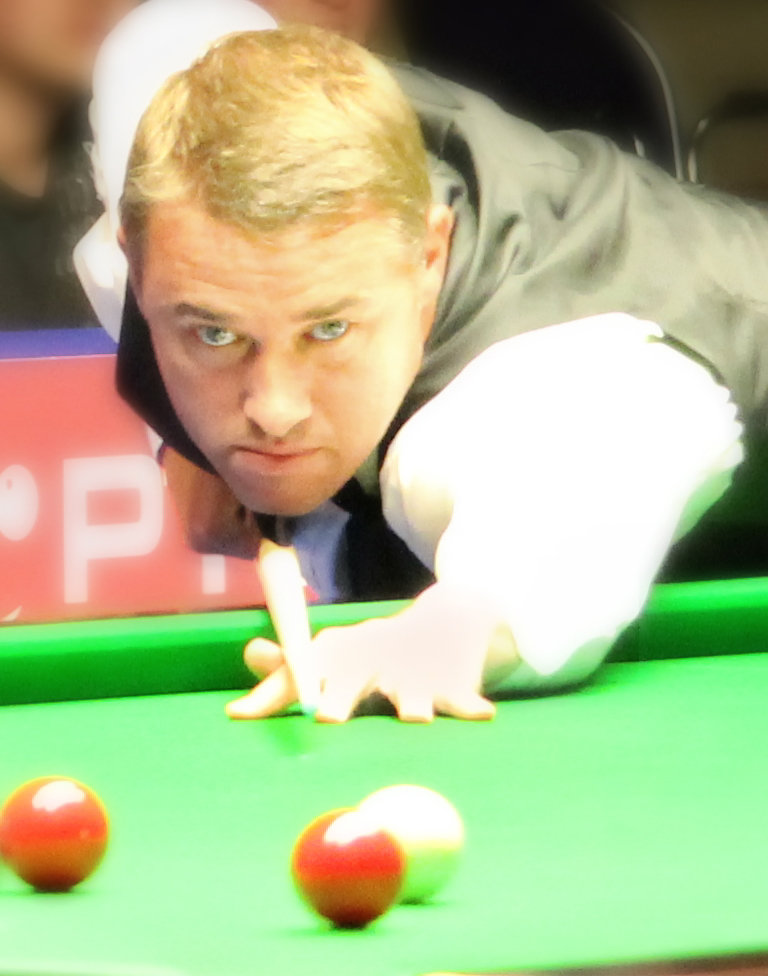
Stephen Hendry (pictured in 2011) won the title.

The quarter-finals were played as best of 25 frames matches over three sessions on 28 and 29 April. McManus and Parrott each won four frames during their first session. McManus want on to lead 6–4 and 7–5 before the pair were level again at 7–7 and then McManus won the next two frames for a 9–7 lead at the end of session two. He won the first two frames of the third session to double his advantage to four frames, but then Parrott won five consecutive frames for a 12–11 lead. In the 24th frame, Parrott was 24 points ahead when he committed a foul by one of his sleeves touching a ball. The frame was eventually won by McManus after the pair had engaged in a lengthy exchange of safety shots on the pink. In the deciding frame, McManus made a break of 50 and won the frame 79–0. McManus said afterwards that on during the third session he was nervous and that the session was a "dog fight". Parrott complimented his opponent, saying that "Alan played exceptionally good snooker. that was the only thing that got to me." He became the latest player to fail to successfully defend his title at the Crucible, as all champions since the move to the venue in 1977 had, in what has become known as the "Crucible curse".

Ebdon lost each of the first two sessions against Griffiths by margins of 3–5, despite making a 134 break in the fifth frame and a 108 in frame 15. He compiled another 108 break in the second frame of the concluding session, but lost the match 7–13. White and Wych each won two of the first four frames, then White pulled away to lead 6–2 by the end of their first session. Wych recovered to 5–6, before White led by three frames at 8–5. Wych moved to within one frame again at 8–7 then White won frame 16 with a break of 98. A break of 104 in frame 18 gave White an 11–7 lead, and he went on to win 13–9. Hendry took a 5–3 first session lead against O'Kane. O'Kane won two of the next three frames, but lost 6–13.

=== Semi-finals ===
The semi-finals took place between 30 April and 2 May as best of 31 frames matches played over four sessions. White lost the first two frames against McManus, but then won the next four, and they ended the first session level at 4–4. White took the last two frames of the second session and carried a 9–6 lead into session three. In the third session, White won seven of the eight frames, and wrapped up his victory at 16–7 by taking the first frame of session four. McManus said afterwards that he did not feel under pressure during the match, and commented that "I just went from bad to worse ... The game with Parrott took a lot out of me."

Hendry set a record in the semi-final, when he beat Griffiths 16–4. This was the biggest semi-final victory at the World Championship, until it was superseded by Ronnie O'Sullivan in 2004 when he defeated Hendry 17–4. It also maintained Hendry's unbeaten record against Griffiths. This was their 13th competitive match. Hendry had two breaks over 50 in winning the first two frames, and took the third after needing two snookers. He led 7–0 at the end of the first session, having won the fifth frame on a re-spotted black and the seventh after fluking the last red ball. In frame eight, another fluke by Hendry led to him making a 60 break, and two frames later he was 10–0 ahead. Griffiths was 66 points behind in frame 11, but went on to win it. In the next frame, Hendry made a 130 break, failing in his attempt to pot the final pink. The session ended with Hendry 12–2 up. With breaks of 76 and 103, he extended his lead to 14–2, and ran out the winner at 16–4.

=== Final ===
The final between Stephen Hendry and Jimmy White was played as the best of 35 frames across four sessions on 3 and 4 May. Hendry trailed 8–14 during the third session, before winning ten consecutive frames to take his second world title with an 18–14 victory.

Hendry's break of 105 in the first frame was the first century break in the opening frame of a world championship final. Breaks of 70 and 47 saw White take frame two, then Hendry re-took the lead at 2–1, before a break of 100 from White equalised the match at 2–2. They were again level at 3–3; White won the seventh frame to hold the lead at the close of the first session. A clearance of 63 in the first frame of the second session meant White was two frames ahead at 5–3. He led by the same margin at 6–4 and 7–5, then doubled this advantage to four frames by winning the next two. Hendry won the 15th frame, a break of 70 by White left him 10–6 ahead at the end of the first day.

In the first frame of the third session, White made breaks of 40 and 50, then followed this in frame 18 with a total clearance of 134 to lead 12–6, having scored 294 points since Hendry had last scored any. Hendry compiled a break of 86 to take the 19th frame, and then won frame 20 with breaks of 30 and 45. The next two frames both featured breaks over 60 by White as he re-established a six-frame lead. Snooker journalist and historian David Hendon wrote in 2025 that "at 12–6 it seemed as if White's coronation as world champion was guaranteed", and that this still seemed very likely when the score reached 14–8. During the 24th frame, Hendry potted a brown off the spot from the last red and gained position to pot the yellow. In 2020 he called this "one of the best shots of my career". Brendan Cooper, author of Deep Pockets: Snooker and the Meaning of Life (2023), described the shot as "a quintessential moment of ice-cold Hendry guts." Hendry went on to clear the table and win the frame; Cooper described this as "the beginning of the end" for White. Everton wrote that while Hendry "kept his nerve and his resolve", White was "strangely unfocused".

Hendry compiled three century breaks during the concluding five frames and won 18–14. It was the fourth time that White had lost in a world championship final, and the third consecutive year that he had done so. Hendry said in a post-match interview that he felt it was the "best snooker [he] had ever played", adding that he did "feel sorry for Jimmy. If he wasn't playing me, I would have wanted him to win". White praised the standard of Hendry's play, and said "every time I made a mistake, he kept punching me. This is the only time I've lost here when I don't feel sick."

The final attracted 11.6 million television viewers, the highest viewing figure for the championship final for six years. This match was reshown on BBC Two on 24 April 2020, one of the "Crucible Classics" shown in place of the 2020 World Snooker Championship which was postponed because of the coronavirus pandemic.

== Main draw ==
Shown below are the results for each round. The numbers in parentheses beside some of the players are their seeding ranks (each championship has 16 seeds and 16 qualifiers).

First round Best of 19 frames
18 April
John Parrott (ENG) (1)	10
Eddie Charlton (AUS)	0
18 & 19 April
Tony Knowles (ENG) (16)	10
Mark Johnston-Allen (ENG)	4
20 & 21 April
Dennis Taylor (NIR) (9)	6
Mick Price (ENG)	10
19 & 20 April
Mike Hallett (ENG) (8)	8
Alan McManus (SCO)	10
21 April
Gary Wilkinson (ENG) (5)	6
Willie Thorne (ENG)	10
19 & 20 April
Dean Reynolds (ENG) (12)	7
Jim Wych (CAN)	10
22 & 23 April
Alain Robidoux (CAN) (13)	10
Nigel Bond (ENG)	7
22 April
Jimmy White (ENG) (4)	10
Tony Drago (Malta)	4
19 April
Steve Davis (ENG) (3)	4
Peter Ebdon (ENG)	10
18 April
Martin Clark (ENG) (14)	10
Peter Francisco (SAF)	7
21 & 22 April
Terry Griffiths (WAL) (11)	10
Bob Chaperon (CAN)	8
20 & 21 April
Neal Foulds (ENG) (6)	10
Jason Ferguson (ENG)	8
21 & 22 April
Steve James (ENG) (7)	9
Dene O'Kane (NZL)	10
22 & 23 April
Doug Mountjoy (WAL) (10)	7
Chris Small (SCO)	10
20 April
Tony Jones (ENG) (15)	5
James Wattana (THA)	10
18 & 19 April
Stephen Hendry (SCO) (2)	10
Stephen Murphy (IRE)	3

Second round Best of 25 frames
23, 24 & 25 April
John Parrott (ENG) (1)	13
Tony Knowles (ENG) (16)	4
24 & 25 April
Mick Price (ENG)	10
Alan McManus (SCO)	13
26 & 27 April
Willie Thorne (ENG)	6
Jim Wych (CAN)	13
25, 26 & 27 April
Alain Robidoux (CAN) (13)	11
Jimmy White (ENG) (4)	13
23 & 24 April
Peter Ebdon (ENG)	13
Martin Clark (ENG) (14)	4
24 & 25 April
Terry Griffiths (WAL) (11)	13
Neal Foulds (ENG) (6)	7
26 & 27 April
Dene O'Kane (NZL)	13
Chris Small (SCO)	10
25, 26 & 27 April
James Wattana (THA)	10
Stephen Hendry (SCO) (2)	13

Quarter-finals; Best of 25 frames
28 & 29 April
John Parrott (ENG) (1)	12
Alan McManus (SCO)	13
28 & 29 April
Jim Wych (CAN)	9
Jimmy White (ENG) (4)	13
28 & 29 April
Peter Ebdon (ENG)	7
Terry Griffiths (WAL) (11)	13
28 & 29 April
Dene O'Kane (NZL)	6
Stephen Hendry (SCO) (2)	13

Semi-finals; Best of 31 frames
30 April, 1 & 2 May
Alan McManus (SCO)	7
Jimmy White (ENG) (4)	16
30 April & 1 May
Terry Griffiths (WAL) (11)	4
Stephen Hendry (SCO) (2)	16

Final; Best of 35 frames
3 & 4 May
Jimmy White (ENG) (4)	14
Stephen Hendry (SCO) (2)	18

Final: (Best of 35 frames) Crucible Theatre, Sheffield, 3 & 4 May 1992; Referee: John Street (ENG)
Jimmy White (ENG) (4)				14–18			Stephen Hendry (SCO) (3)			
Session 1: 4–3
Frame	1	2	3	4	5	6	7	8	9	10
White	0	117^{†} (70)	57	101^{†} (100)	69^{†}	8	68^{†} (68)	N/A	N/A	N/A
Hendry	107^{†} (105)	16	70^{†}	15	54	76^{†}	53 (53)	N/A	N/A	N/A
Session 2: 6–3 (10–6)
Frame	1	2	3	4	5	6	7	8	9	10
White	67^{†} (63)	29	92^{†}	47	62^{†}	128^{†} (72)	71^{†}	11	83^{†} (70)	N/A
Hendry	65 (53)	75^{†}	9	63^{†}	54	6	8	70^{†}	28	N/A
Session 3: 4–4 (14–10)
Frame	1	2	3	4	5	6	7	8	9	10
White	90^{†} (50)	134^{†} (134)	0	7	76^{†} (65)	86^{†} (63)	35	53	N/A	N/A
Hendry	0	0	86^{†} (86)	76^{†}	8	52	77^{†}	65^{†} (64)	N/A	N/A
Session 4: 0–8 (14–18)
Frame	1	2	3	4	5	6	7	8	9	10
White	61	56	19	0	30	26	0	5	N/A	N/A
Hendry	63^{†}	70^{†} (52)	70^{†} (56)	128^{†} (128)	59^{†}	81^{†} (52)	134^{†} (134)	112^{†} (112)	N/A	N/A
134				Highest break			134			
2				Century breaks			4			
10				50+ breaks			11			
Stephen Hendry wins the 1992 World Snooker Championship; Breaks over 50 are shown in parentheses. † = Winner of frame

== Qualifying results ==
Results for the qualifying rounds are shown below.

=== Round 1 ===
Round 1 (Preliminary round)
Winner	Score	Loser
Chris Achilles (ENG)	6–0	Michael Eaves (ENG)
Kevin Ashby (ENG)	6–0	Michael Leach (ENG)
Jonathan Bagley (ENG)	w.o.	Russell Toombes (ENG)
Garry Baldrey (ENG)	6–5	Mark Faulkner (ENG)
Roy Bigg (ENG)	6–2	John Burns (ENG)
Antony Bolsover (ENG)	6–3	Graham Stevens (ENG)
Christopher Booth (ENG)	6–5	Russell Gough (ENG)
Alex Borg (MLT)	6–2	Foizur Rahman (ENG)
Mark Boyd (ENG)	6–3	Anthony Buckley (ENG)
Karl Broughton (ENG)	6–0	Chris Archer (ENG)
Terrance Burke (ENG)	6–2	Craig Kerry (CAN)
Karl Burrows (ENG)	6–0	Andreas Ahmed (ENG)
Amrik Cheema (IND)	6–4	Brian Cassidy (ENG)
Sam Chong (MYS)	6–5	Anthony O'Connor (IRE)
John Clouden (ENG)	6–5	Robert Harrhy (WAL)
Karen Corr (NIR)	6–3	Patrick Mahon (IRE)
Paul Davies (WAL)	6–5	Drew Henry (SCO)
Anthony Davies (WAL)	w.o.	Paul Riley (ENG)
Paul Dawkins (WAL)	6–1	Neil Martin (SCO)
Joe Delaney (IRE)	6–2	Trevor Holtby (ENG)
Frank Dezi (ENG)	w.o.	Stephen Webster (ENG)
Robert Dickson (ENG)	6–2	David Singh (IND)
Ann-Marie Farren (ENG)	6–4	Mark Jervis (ENG)
David Finbow (ENG)	6–2	Sacha Journet (ENG)
Tom Finstad (CAN)	6–2	Ahimar Bjarnsson (ISL)
Allison Fisher (ENG)	6–2	Adrian Rosa (ENG)
Graham Fisken (ENG)	6–3	Thomas McKenna (ENG)
Robert Foxall (ENG)	6–0	Mike Colquitt (IOM)
Surinder Gill (ENG)	w.o.	Paul Strafford (ENG)
Michael Gold (ENG)	6–5	John Harrop (ENG)
Julian Goodyear (ENG)	w.o.	Kirk Byers (ENG)
Martin Grainger (ENG)	6–2	Andrew Clark (ENG)
Geoff Grennan (ENG)	6–1	Barry Zee (SIN)
Darren Guest (ENG)	6–5	Sergio Beggiato (ENG)
Darren Hackeson (ENG)	w.o.	Neil Shaw (ENG)
David Hamson (ENG)	6–5	Karl Townsend (ENG)
Dave Harold (ENG)	w.o.	Fred Richardson (ENG)
Jason Hawen (ENG)	6–2	Dave Andrew (ENG)
Paul Hefford (ENG)	6–0	John Mulready (IRE)
John Herbert (WAL)	6–3	Pat Horne (ENG)
Mehmet Husnu (CYP)	6–5	Darren Clarke (ENG)
Will Jerram (ENG)	6–1	Chris Milner (ENG)
Nick Jones (WAL)	6–4	Iwan Jones (WAL)
Steve Judd (ENG)	w.o.	Phil Mumford (ENG)
Pat Kenny (ENG)	6–2	Jason Pegram (ENG)
Oliver King (ENG)	6–0	Kevin Brown (ENG)
Sean Lanigan (ENG)	6–3	Alex Coutts (SCO)
Gary Lees (ENG)	6–1	Barry O'Loughlin (IRE)
Roger Leighton (ENG)	6–4	Sukhbir Grewal (ENG)
Stuart Mann (ENG)	6–3	Paul Gavey (WAL)
Paul Maskell (ENG)	w.o.	Sean Seymour (ENG)
Frank Maskell (ENG)	6–4	Lyndon Smith (ENG)
Vince McCluskey (ENG)	6–5	Steve Elliott (ENG)
David McDonnell (IRE)	6–2	Karl Payne (ENG)
Dermot McGlinchey (NIR)	6–4	Tony Pierucci (ENG)
David McLellan (SCO)	6–0	Maureen McCarthy (NIR)
Steve Mifsud (AUS)	6–2	David Wright (ENG)
Philip Minchin (ENG)	6–2	Lawrence Lillie (ENG)
Simon Morris (ENG)	6–0	Stan Haslam (ENG)
Colin Morton (ENG)	6–1	Dylan Leary (NIR)
Aidan Murphy (IRE)	6–3	Nick Walker (ENG)
Chris Nicholson (ENG)	6–1	Nicholas Segal (ENG)
Fergal O'Brien (IRE)	6–2	Mark Elliott (ENG)
Stephen O'Connor (IRE)	6–4	Chris Carpenter (ENG)
Jimmy O'Shea (ENG)	w.o.	David Hoggarth (ENG)
Daryl Peach (ENG)	6–0	Stephen Sanders (ENG)
Stuart Pegrum (ENG)	6–3	Andrew Alexandrou (ENG)
Richard Pincott (ENG)	6–0	Ronnie Shakespeare (ENG)
Stuart Reardon (ENG)	6–4	Michael Stocks (ENG)
John Rees (ENG)	6–2	Gareth Esprit (ENG)
David Rice (ENG)	6–1	Ian Barry Stark (ENG)
Jamie Rous (ENG)	6–3	Stuart Henderson (ENG)
Billy Snaddon (SCO)	6–2	Gaye Burns (IRE)
Luke Spiller (ENG)	6–1	Claudio Ravagnani (ITA)
Sean Storey (ENG)	6–1	Alan Trigg (ENG)
Joe Swail (NIR)	6–2	Gary Hill (ENG)
Robert Tavagna (AUS)	6–2	Kevin Johnstone (ENG)
Robert Thallon (SCO)	w.o.	Kostas Andreou (ENG)
Martin Unsworth (ENG)	6–5	Gregg Tugby (ENG)
Hassan Vaizie (ENG)	6–4	Justin Buckingham (ENG)
Darryn Walker (ENG)	6–5	Steve Ventham (ENG)
Jason Walton (ENG)	6–1	Mark Witts (ENG)
Simon Westcott (ENG)	w.o.	Joe Baines (IRE)
Jason Weston (ENG)	6–0	Ian Gerrard (ENG)
John White (CAN)	6–4	Wayne Lloyd (WAL)
Kevin Young (ENG)	w.o.	Paul Vallance (ENG)

=== Round 2 ===
Round 2 (Pre-qualifying round)
Winner	Score	Loser
Shokat Ali (PAK)	6–2	Elliott Clark (ENG)
Kevin Ashby (ENG)	6–2	Timothy Paling (ENG)
Jonathan Bagley (ENG)	6–3	Anton Bishop (ENG)
Garry Baldrey (ENG)	6–0	Andrew Photiou (ENG)
Nic Barrow (ENG)	6–2	Stuart Mann (ENG)
Antony Bolsover (ENG)	6–2	Peter Oakley (ENG)
Alex Borg (MLT)	w.o.	Eddie Galati (CAN)
Christian Brooks (ENG)	w.o.	Norman Maher (WAL)
Karl Broughton (ENG)	6–5	Jamie Woodman (ENG)
Karl Burrows (ENG)	6–2	David Grimwood (ENG)
Brian Cakebread (ENG)	6–5	Daniel Murphy (ENG)
Marcus Campbell (SCO)	w.o.	Jason Peplow (MLT)
Martin Carolan (ENG)	6–0	Tony Bolahood (CAN)
Amrik Cheema (IND)	6–0	Michael Burke (ENG)
Sam Chong (MYS)	6–2	Peter Gilchrist (ENG)
Paul Clutterbuck (CAN)	6–4	Paul Maskell (ENG)
Roy Connor (ENG)	6–2	Chris Achilles (ENG)
Jeff Cundy (ENG)	6–2	Steve Mifsud (AUS)
Peter Daubney (ENG)	6–3	John Rees (ENG)
Anthony Davies (WAL)	6–0	John Benton (IRE)
Paul Davies (WAL)	6–4	Richy McDonald (SCO)
Paul Dawkins (WAL)	6–3	Russell Burgess (ENG)
Frank Dezi (ENG)	6–0	Clive Bernstone (ENG)
Robert Dickson (ENG)	6–1	Paul Lovegrove (ENG)
Peter Donegan (ENG)	6–2	David Lazenby (ENG)
Mike Dunn (ENG)	6–1	Jason Curtis (ENG)
Jason Dunworth (ENG)	w.o.	Neville Atkins (ENG)
Peter Ebdon (ENG)	6–1	Dermot McGlinchey (NIR)
Tony Emmott (ENG)	6–4	Geoff Grennan (ENG)
Ann-Marie Farren (ENG)	6–4	Norman MacLachlan (SCO)
Mark Farrimond (ENG)	6–1	Robert Thallon (SCO)
Neil Figgins (ENG)	w.o.	Stuart Green (ENG)
Gary Filtness (ENG)	6–5	Darren Lennox (IRE)
Tom Finstad (CAN)	6–1	Tim Dunphy (IRE)
Graham Fisken (ENG)	6–3	Paul Smith (ENG)
Frank Fitzgerald (ENG)	6–0	Steve Harrison (ENG)
Mark Flowerdew (ENG)	6–3	Christopher Booth (ENG)
Nick Fruin (ENG)	6–3	Mukesh Parmar (ENG)
Michael Gold (ENG)	6–0	Graham Bradley (ENG)
Julian Goodyear (ENG)	6–5	Dale Milton (ENG)
Lee Grant (ENG)	6–2	Mark Boyd (ENG)
Leigh Griffin (ENG)	6–1	David Cheung (HKG)
Carl Groves (ENG)	6–2	Alex Peart (JAM)
Darren Guest (ENG)	6–2	David Athorn (ENG)
Simon Haggerty (SCO)	6–4	Philip Seaton (ENG)
Anthony Hamilton (ENG)	6–5	Nick Jones (WAL)
Dave Harold (ENG)	w.o.	Stephen Wylie (SCO)
Jason Hawen (ENG)	6–5	Paul Cavney (ENG)
Euan Henderson (SCO)	6–4	Richard Pincott (ENG)
John Herbert (WAL)	6–2	Steven Cook (ENG)
Andy Hicks (ENG)	6–2	Chris Capel (ENG)
Stacey Hillyard (ENG)	6–4	Steve Prest (ENG)
Graham Horne (SCO)	6–2	Karen Corr (NIR)
Michael Huntingdon (ENG)	6–2	David Brabiner (JER)
Will Jerram (ENG)	6–0	Richard King (II) (ENG)
Craig Johnston-Allen (ENG)	6–5	Steve Lemmens (BEL)
Bradley Jones (ENG)	6–1	Nick Stanfield (ENG)
Gerry Jones (IRE)	6–4	John Leahy (IRE)
Steve Judd (ENG)	6–1	Jerry Williams (ENG)
Pat Kenny (ENG)	6–2	Steve Hornby (WAL)
Mark King (ENG)	6–4	David Boon (CAN)
Oliver King (ENG)	6–1	Douglas French (ENG)
Bjorn L'Orange (NOR)	6–4	Philip Minchin (ENG)
Hitesh Lakhani (ENG)	6–3	Terrance Burke (ENG)
Sean Lanigan (ENG)	6–5	Jimmy Long (IRE)
Nicky Lazarus (ENG)	6–4	Martin Unsworth (ENG)
Roger Leighton (ENG)	6–2	David Langton (ENG)
Peter Lines (ENG)	6–3	Martin Grainger (ENG)
Sean Lynskey (ENG)	6–2	Marc Devon (ENG)
Craig MacGillivray (SCO)	6–2	John Timson (ENG)
John Manley (ENG)	6–2	Luke Spiller (ENG)
Eddie Manning (ENG)	6–4	Stuart Reardon (ENG)
Wayne Martin (ENG)	6–3	Cary Kikis (ENG)
Frank Maskell (ENG)	6–4	Robert Ritchie (SCO)
Stefan Mazrocis (ENG)	6–0	Johangir Khan (ENG)
Kieran McAlinden (NIR)	w.o.	Ted Guerreri (CAN)
Peter McCullagh (ENG)	6–2	Barry Bunn (ENG)
David McDonnell (IRE)	6–3	Chris Barnett (ENG)
David McLellan (SCO)	6–1	Mark Evans (ENG)
Paul McPhillips (SCO)	6–4	Sean Storey (ENG)
Shaun Mellish (ENG)	w.o.	Peter Delaney (ENG)
Jimmy Michie (ENG)	6–4	Vince McCluskey (ENG)
Harry Morgan (NIR)	6–1	Paul McDonald (ENG)
Paul Morgan (ENG)	6–3	David Hamson (ENG)
Simon Morris (ENG)	6–2	John Dobson (WAL)
Colin Morton (ENG)	6–2	Paul Hurren (ENG)
Aidan Murphy (IRE)	6–4	Chris Palmer (ENG)
Terry Murphy (NIR)	6–5	Rory McLeod (ENG)
Craig Newson (ENG)	6–3	John Clouden (ENG)
Chris Nicholson (ENG)	6–2	Damon Zeid (ENG)
Tim Norris (ENG)	6–3	Matthew McGrotty (ENG)
Fergal O'Brien (IRE)	6–2	Louis Fazekas (CAN)
Jimmy O'Shea (ENG)	6–1	Richard Pipe (ENG)
Simon Parker (ENG)	6–5	Steve Whalley (ENG)
Daryl Peach (ENG)	6–3	David Young (ENG)
Alan Peacock (ENG)	6–2	Paul Webb (ENG)
Mark Pugh (ENG)	6–2	Shane Haines (ENG)
Tony Rampello (ENG)	6–1	Hassan Vaizie (ENG)
Paul Raulston (ENG)	6–5	Robert Foxall (ENG)
John Read (ENG)	6–3	Stephen O'Connor (IRE)
Wayne Rendle (ENG)	6–3	Mehmet Husnu (CYP)
David Rice (ENG)	6–2	Stuart Parnell (ENG)
David Rippon (ENG)	6–4	Surinder Gill (ENG)
Jamie Rous (ENG)	6–5	Micky Roughan (IRE)
Steve Russell (ENG)	6–1	Ralph Mason (ENG)
Pete Seager (ENG)	6–2	Richard Davis (ENG)
Neil Selman (ENG)	6–2	John Jorgensen (CAN)
Geet Sethi (IND)	6–2	John Fox (ENG)
Troy Shaw (ENG)	6–2	Richard McHugh (IRE)
John Shilton (ENG)	6–3	Stuart Pegrum (ENG)
Jimmy Singh (ENG)	6–2	Roy Bigg (ENG)
Chris Small (SCO)	6–4	Allison Fisher (ENG)
Mike Smith (ENG)	6–4	Lee Richardson (ENG)
Billy Snaddon (SCO)	6–4	Mark Davis (ENG)
Joe Swail (NIR)	6–0	Robert Chapman (ENG)
Stuart Swinburn (ENG)	6–2	Mike Henson (GER)
Paul Tanner (ENG)	6–4	Gary Lees (ENG)
Robert Tavagna (AUS)	6–4	Peter Peratikou (ENG)
Anthony Taylor (ENG)	6–2	Ahmed Hussein Gamal (EGY)
Gary Thomas (SCO)	6–2	Leigh Robinson (ENG)
Dean Venables (ENG)	6–5	Joe Delaney (IRE)
Darryn Walker (ENG)	6–0	Fjolnir Thorgeirsson (ISL)
Jason Wallace (ENG)	6–1	David Finbow (ENG)
Jason Walton (ENG)	6–4	Kevin Lownds (ENG)
John Welsh (ENG)	6–3	Darren Hackeson (ENG)
Jason Weston (ENG)	6–5	Richard Moore (ENG)
John White (CAN)	6–3	Micky Wareham (ENG)
Geoff Williams (ENG)	6–4	Paul Hefford (ENG)
Peter Williams (WAL)	w.o.	Anthony Gorman (ENG)
George Wood (ENG)	6–1	Navid Khan (ENG)
Kevin Young (ENG)	6–4	John Cahill (CAN)
Robert Yule (ENG)	6–4	Simon Westcott (ENG)

=== Rounds 3, 4 and 5 ===
Round 3 (Pre-qualifying round)
Winner	Score	Loser
Kevin Ashby (ENG)	6–1	Frank Fitzgerald (ENG)
Alex Borg (MLT)	6–3	Simon Morris (ENG)
Christian Brooks (ENG)	6–3	Stacey Hillyard (ENG)
Karl Broughton (ENG)	6–2	Robert Yule (ENG)
Karl Burrows (ENG)	6–3	Jason Hawen (ENG)
Amrik Cheema (IND)	6–3	Geoff Williams (ENG)
Jeff Cundy (ENG)	6–5	Jonathan Bagley (ENG)
Peter Daubney (ENG)	6–4	Graham Fisken (ENG)
Anthony Davies (WAL)	6–3	Michael Gold (ENG)
Frank Dezi (ENG)	6–4	Billy Snaddon (SCO)
Robert Dickson (ENG)	6–2	Jimmy Singh (ENG)
Peter Donegan (ENG)	6–5	Craig Newson (ENG)
Jason Dunworth (ENG)	6–2	Craig MacGillivray (SCO)
Peter Ebdon (ENG)	6–3	Kevin Young (ENG)
Neil Figgins (ENG)	6–2	Marcus Campbell (SCO)
Gary Filtness (ENG)	6–5	Shokat Ali (PAK)
Tom Finstad (CAN)	6–1	Wayne Rendle (ENG)
Mark Flowerdew (ENG)	6–5	Paul Morgan (ENG)
Nick Fruin (ENG)	6–2	Paul McPhillips (SCO)
Julian Goodyear (ENG)	6–5	Dean Venables (ENG)
Leigh Griffin (ENG)	6–1	Brian Cakebread (ENG)
Carl Groves (ENG)	6–5	Mark King (ENG)
Darren Guest (ENG)	6–3	Paul Clutterbuck (CAN)
Simon Haggerty (SCO)	6–5	Peter McCullagh (ENG)
Anthony Hamilton (ENG)	6–0	Tony Emmott (ENG)
Euan Henderson (SCO)	6–5	Nic Barrow (ENG)
Andy Hicks (ENG)	6–5	John Shilton (ENG)
Graham Horne (SCO)	6–4	John White (CAN)
Will Jerram (ENG)	6–4	John Welsh (ENG)
Steve Judd (ENG)	6–0	John Read (ENG)
Pat Kenny (ENG)	6–4	Lee Grant (ENG)
Oliver King (ENG)	6–3	Sam Chong (MYS)
Bjorn L'Orange (NOR)	6–5	John Herbert (WAL)
Sean Lanigan (ENG)	6–5	Antony Bolsover (ENG)
Sean Lynskey (ENG)	6–5	Bradley Jones (ENG)
John Manley (ENG)	6–4	Garry Baldrey (ENG)
Wayne Martin (ENG)	6–5	Michael Huntingdon (ENG)
Frank Maskell (ENG)	6–3	Jimmy O'Shea (ENG)
Stefan Mazrocis (ENG)	6–5	Gary Thomas (SCO)
Kieran McAlinden (NIR)	6–0	Peter Williams (WAL)
David McDonnell (IRE)	6–5	Roger Leighton (ENG)
David McLellan (SCO)	6–2	Mark Farrimond (ENG)
Shaun Mellish (ENG)	6–3	Mike Dunn (ENG)
Jimmy Michie (ENG)	6–5	Dave Harold (ENG)
Colin Morton (ENG)	6–5	Tony Rampello (ENG)
Terry Murphy (NIR)	6–4	Martin Carolan (ENG)
Chris Nicholson (ENG)	6–3	Jamie Rous (ENG)
Fergal O'Brien (IRE)	6–0	Eddie Manning (ENG)
Simon Parker (ENG)	6–5	Tim Norris (ENG)
Alan Peacock (ENG)	6–4	Craig Johnston-Allen (ENG)
Mark Pugh (ENG)	6–5	Mike Smith (ENG)
Paul Raulston (ENG)	6–4	Aidan Murphy (IRE)
David Rippon (ENG)	6–2	Paul Dawkins (WAL)
Steve Russell (ENG)	6–3	Gerry Jones (IRE)
Pete Seager (ENG)	6–4	Harry Morgan (NIR)
Neil Selman (ENG)	6–5	Stuart Swinburn (ENG)
Troy Shaw (ENG)	6–4	Geet Sethi (IND)
Chris Small (SCO)	6–3	Nicky Lazarus (ENG)
Joe Swail (NIR)	6–3	Roy Connor (ENG)
Paul Tanner (ENG)	6–3	Paul Davies (WAL)
Robert Tavagna (AUS)	6–2	David Rice (ENG)
Anthony Taylor (ENG)	6–4	George Wood (ENG)
Darryn Walker (ENG)	6–4	Daryl Peach (ENG)
Jason Wallace (ENG)	6–5	Peter Lines (ENG)
Jason Walton (ENG)	6–4	Hitesh Lakhani (ENG)
Jason Weston (ENG)	6–2	Ann-Marie Farren (ENG)

Round 4 (last round of pre-qualifying competition)
Winner	Score	Loser
Jimmy Michie (ENG)	6–0	Chris Nicholson (ENG)
Pat Kenny (ENG)	6–3	Frank Dezi (ENG)
Jeff Cundy (ENG)	6–2	Alex Borg (MLT)
Kieran McAlinden (NIR)	6–5	Gary Filtness (ENG)
Sean Lynskey (ENG)	6–4	Carl Groves (ENG)
Alan Peacock (ENG)	6–3	Steve Russell (ENG)
David McDonnell (IRL)	6–5	Steve Judd (ENG)
Wayne Martin (ENG)	6–3	Stefan Mazrocis (ENG)
Karl Broughton (ENG)	6–3	John Manley (ENG)
Leigh Griffin (ENG)	6–2	Peter Donegan (IRL)
Andy Hicks (ENG)	6–4	Neil Figgins (ENG)
Mark Pugh (ENG)	6–2	Anthony Taylor (ENG)
Darryn Walker (ENG)	6–1	Frank Maskell (ENG)
Kevin Ashby (ENG)	6–5	Pete Seager (ENG)
Euan Henderson (SCO)	6–3	Colin Morton (ENG)
David Rippon (ENG)	6–5	Mark Flowerdew (ENG)
Anthony Hamilton (ENG)	6–1	Paul Tanner (ENG)
Peter Ebdon (ENG)	6–1	Darren Guest (ENG)
Jason Wallace (ENG)	6–0	Paul Raulston (ENG)
Karl Burrows (ENG)	6–3	Jason Weston (ENG)
Will Jerram (ENG)	6–3	Jason Walton (ENG)
Robert Tavagna (AUS)	6–5	Amrik Cheema (IND)
Fergal O'Brien (IRL)	6–1	Nick Fruin (ENG)
Oliver King (ENG)	6–2	Julian Goodyear (ENG)
Simon Haggerty (SCO)	6–5	Troy Shaw (ENG)
Shaun Mellish (ENG)	6–2	Neil Selman (ENG)
Simon Parker (ENG)	6–3	Jason Dunworth (ENG)
Chris Small (SCO)	6–3	David McLellan (SCO)
Christian Brooks (ENG)	6–4	Terry Murphy (NIR)
Joe Swail (NIR)	6–2	Anthony Davies (WAL)
Peter Daubney (ENG)	6–2	Tom Finstad (CAN)
Bjorn L'Orange (NOR)	6–5	Graham Horne (SCO)
Robert Dickson (ENG)	6–2	Sean Lanigan (ENG)

Round 5 (start of main qualifying competition)
Winner	Score	Loser
Pat Kenny (ENG)	10–9	Jimmy Michie (ENG)
Malcolm Bradley (ENG)	10–9	Jeff Cundy (ENG)
Kieran McAlinden (NIR)	10–3	Jack Fitzmaurice (IRL)
Sean Lynskey (ENG)	w.o.	Graham Miles (ENG)
Alan Peacock (ENG)	10–3	Jim Donnelly (SCO)
David McDonnell (IRL)	10–4	Anthony Harris (ENG)
Alex Higgins (NIR)	10–3	Wayne Martin (ENG)
Karl Broughton (ENG)	10–2	Mick Fisher (ENG)
Leigh Griffin (ENG)	w.o.	Billy Kelly (IRL)
Andy Hicks (ENG)	10–3	Graham Cripsey (ENG)
Mark Pugh (ENG)	w.o.	Terry Whitthread (ENG)
Chris Cookson (ENG)	10–8	Darryn Walker (ENG)
Kevin Ashby (ENG)	10–4	Matt Gibson (SCO)
Tony Kearney (IRL)	10–9	Euan Henderson (SCO)
David Rippon (ENG)	10–6	George Scott (ENG)
Anthony Hamilton (ENG)	10–0	Bernard Bennett (ENG)
Peter Ebdon (ENG)	10–2	Derek Heaton (ENG)
Nick Terry (ENG)	10–8	Jason Wallace (ENG)
Karl Burrows (ENG)	10–3	Bert Demarco (SCO)
Dave Martin (ENG)	10–8	Will Jerram (ENG)
Eric Lawlor (ENG)	10–8	Robert Tavagna (AUS)
Ian Williamson (ENG)	10–7	Fergal O'Brien (IRL)
Jason Ferguson (ENG)	10–2	Oliver King (ENG)
Simon Haggerty (SCO)	10–5	John Dunning (ENG)
Shaun Mellish (ENG)	10–4	Mike Darrington (ENG)
John Rea (SCO)	10–7	Simon Parker (ENG)
Chris Small (SCO)	10–6	Steve Meakin (ENG)
Bill Werbeniuk (CAN)	w.o.	Christian Brooks (ENG)
Joe Swail (NIR)	w.o.	Paddy Morgan (AUS)
Peter Daubney (ENG)	10–1	Fred Davis (ENG)
Bjorn L'Orange (NOR)	10–6	Paul Watchorn (ENG)
Steve Longworth (ENG)	10–9	Robert Dickson (ENG)

=== Rounds 6 to 9 ===
Round 6 Best of 19 frames
Dave Gilbert (ENG)	8
Pat Kenny (ENG)	10
Joe O'Boye (IRE)	10
Malcolm Bradley (ENG)	3
Robby Foldvari (AUS)	10
Kieran McAlinden (NIR)	8
Murdo MacLeod (SCO)	10
Sean Lynskey (ENG)	5
Mick Price (ENG)	10
Alan Peacock (ENG)	7
Andrew Cairns (ENG)	10
David McDonnell (IRE)	7
Paul Gibson (ENG)	6
Alex Higgins (NIR)	10
Brian Rowswell (ENG)	10
Karl Broughton (ENG)	8
Tony Wilson (IOM)	9
Leigh Griffin (ENG)	10
Jason Smith (ENG)	wd
Andy Hicks (ENG)	w.o.
Paul Medati (ENG)	10
Mark Pugh (ENG)	8
Steve Campbell (ENG)	10
Chris Cookson (ENG)	6
Ray Edmonds (ENG)	8
Kevin Ashby (ENG)	10
Tommy Murphy (NIR)	7
Tony Kearney (IRE)	10
Mario Morra (CAN)	8
David Rippon (ENG)	10
Duncan Campbell (SCO)	9
Anthony Hamilton (ENG)	10
Bob Harris (ENG)	1
Peter Ebdon (ENG)	10
Barry Pinches (ENG)	10
Nick Terry (ENG)	5
Gary Natale (CAN)	10
Karl Burrows (ENG)	4
Ian Brumby (ENG)	10
Dave Martin (ENG)	5
Jon Wright (ENG)	10
Eric Lawlor (ENG)	7
Jason Whittaker (ENG)	10
Ian Williamson (ENG)	9
Paddy Browne (IRE)	0
Jason Ferguson (ENG)	10
Joe Grech (MLT)	10
Simon Haggerty (SCO)	5
Marcel Gauvreau (CAN)	4
Shaun Mellish (ENG)	10
Roger Bales (ENG)	6
John Rea (SCO)	10
Ken Owers (ENG)	8
Chris Small (SCO)	10
David Taylor (ENG)	w.o.
Bill Werbeniuk (CAN)	wd
Bill Oliver (ENG)	1
Joe Swail (NIR)	10
Martin Smith (ENG)	6
Peter Daubney (ENG)	10
John Spencer (ENG)	0
Bjørn L'Orange (NOR)	10
Stephen Murphy (IRE)	10
Steve Longworth (ENG)	6

Round 7 Best of 19 frames
Darren Morgan (WAL)	10
Pat Kenny (ENG)	7
David Roe (ENG)	10
Joe O'Boye (IRE)	7
Brian Morgan (ENG)	8
Robby Foldvari (AUS)	10
Mark Johnston-Allen (ENG)	10
Murdo MacLeod (SCO)	7
Nigel Gilbert (ENG)	1
Mick Price (ENG)	10
Warren King (AUS)	9
Andrew Cairns (ENG)	10
Alan McManus (SCO)	10
Alex Higgins (NIR)	7
Robert Marshall (ENG)	7
Brian Rowswell (ENG)	10
John Campbell (AUS)	0
Leigh Griffin (ENG)	5
Brady Gollan (CAN)	1
Andy Hicks (ENG)	10
Steve Duggan (ENG)	10
Paul Medati (ENG)	8
Jim Wych (CAN)	10
Steve Campbell (ENG)	9
Craig Edwards (ENG)	10
Kevin Ashby (ENG)	5
Jack McLaughlin (NIR)	10
Tony Kearney (IRE)	8
Barry West (ENG)	10
David Rippon (ENG)	7
Mark Rowing (ENG)	8
Anthony Hamilton (ENG)	10
Nick Dyson (ENG)	5
Peter Ebdon (ENG)	10
Jonathan Birch (ENG)	10
Barry Pinches (ENG)	7
Ken Doherty (IRE)	10
Gary Natale (CAN)	1
Franky Chan (HKG)	8
Ian Brumby (ENG)	10
Rex Williams (ENG)	2
Jon Wright (ENG)	10
Jim Chambers (ENG)	7
Jason Whittaker (ENG)	10
Colin Roscoe (WAL)	1
Jason Ferguson (ENG)	10
Tony Meo (ENG)	10
Joe Grech (MLT)	1
Les Dodd (ENG)	6
Shaun Mellish (ENG)	10
Tony Chappel (WAL)	10
John Rea (SCO)	6
Rod Lawler (ENG)	8
Chris Small (SCO)	10
Cliff Thorburn (CAN)	10
David Taylor (ENG)	5
Jason Prince (NIR)	9
Joe Swail (NIR)	10
Kirk Stevens (CAN)	10
Peter Daubney (ENG)	4
Ian Graham (ENG)	10
Bjørn L'Orange (NOR)	7
Eugene Hughes (IRE)	5
Stephen Murphy (IRE)	10

Round 8 Best of 19 frames
Darren Morgan (WAL)	7
David Roe (ENG)	10
Robby Foldvari (AUS)	4
Mark Johnston-Allen (ENG)	10
Mick Price (ENG)	10
Andrew Cairns (ENG)	7
Alan McManus (SCO)	10
Brian Rowswell (ENG)	6
John Campbell (AUS)	9
Andy Hicks (ENG)	10
Steve Duggan (ENG)	8
Jim Wych (CAN)	10
Craig Edwards (ENG)	9
Jack McLaughlin (NIR)	10
Barry West (ENG)	10
Anthony Hamilton (ENG)	9
Peter Ebdon (ENG)	10
Jonathan Birch (ENG)	7
Ken Doherty (IRE)	10
Ian Brumby (ENG)	6
Jon Wright (ENG)	10
Jason Whittaker (ENG)	6
Jason Ferguson (ENG)	10
Tony Meo (ENG)	9
Shaun Mellish (ENG)	10
Tony Chappel (WAL)	1
Chris Small (SCO)	10
Cliff Thorburn (CAN)	7
Joe Swail (NIR)	1
Kirk Stevens (CAN)	10
Ian Graham (ENG)	6
Stephen Murphy (IRE)	10

Round 9 Best of 19 frames
Eddie Charlton (AUS)	10
David Roe (ENG)	5
Steve Newbury (WAL)	2
Mark Johnston-Allen (ENG)	10
Joe Johnson (ENG)	9
Mick Price (ENG)	10
Mark Bennett (WAL)	9
Alan McManus (SCO)	10
Willie Thorne (ENG)	10
Andy Hicks (ENG)	5
John Virgo (ENG)	3
Jim Wych (CAN)	10
Nigel Bond (ENG)	10
Jack McLaughlin (NIR)	2
Tony Drago (MLT)	10
Barry West (ENG)	5
Cliff Wilson (WAL)	0
Peter Ebdon (ENG)	10
Peter Francisco (SAF)	10
Ken Doherty (IRE)	7
Bob Chaperon (CAN)	10
Jon Wright (ENG)	3
Silvino Francisco (SAF)	6
Jason Ferguson (ENG)	10
Dene O'Kane (NZL)	10
Shaun Mellish (ENG)	4
Danny Fowler (ENG)	6
Chris Small (SCO)	10
James Wattana (THA)	10
Kirk Stevens (CAN)	9
Wayne Jones (WAL)	8
Stephen Murphy (IRE)	10

== Century breaks ==
There were 25 century breaks in the main championship. The highest break of the tournament was 147 made by Jimmy White.

- 147, 135, 134, 104, 101, 100 – Jimmy White
- 134, 108, 108 – Peter Ebdon
- 134, 130, 128, 112, 105, 103 – Stephen Hendry
- 132, 117 – Neal Foulds
- 132 – Mick Price
- 129 – Nigel Bond
- 114, 107 – Dene O'Kane
- 114 – Dean Reynolds
- 114 – Chris Small
- 108 – Tony Knowles
- 106 – Willie Thorne
