= 1982 World Team Classic =

State Express World Team Classic
Tournament information
- Dates: 23–31 October 1982
- Venue: Hexagon Theatre
- City: Reading
- Country: England
- Format: Non-ranking event
- Total prize fund: £55,000
- Winner's share: £16,500
- Highest break: Terry Griffiths (WAL), 123

Final
- Champion: Canada
- Runner-up: England
- Score: 4–2 (matches)

The 1982 World Team Classic sponsored by State Express was a team snooker tournament played at the Hexagon Theatre in Reading and the same seven teams as the previous year competed. Canada won their first title with the trio of Cliff Thorburn, Kirk Stevens, Bill Werbeniuk defeating defending champions England 4–2 in the final.

All matches including the final were played as the best of six matches with a tie break frame between the captains if it stayed 3-3. Canada won their first title with the trio of Cliff Thorburn, Kirk Stevens, Bill Werbeniuk beating defending champions England 4–2.

Terry Griffiths made the highest break of the tournament, 123.

== Main draw ==
Teams and known results are listed below.

=== Teams ===
Country	Player 1 (Captain)	Player 2	Player 3
England	Steve Davis	Jimmy White	Tony Knowles
Wales	Doug Mountjoy	Ray Reardon	Terry Griffiths
Northern Ireland	Alex Higgins	Dennis Taylor	Tommy Murphy
Canada	Cliff Thorburn	Bill Werbeniuk	Kirk Stevens
Australia	Eddie Charlton	Paddy Morgan	Ian Anderson
Scotland	Eddie Sinclair	Ian Black	Jim Donnelly
Ireland	Patsy Fagan	Dessie Sheehan	Eugene Hughes

=== Qualifying round ===
Match played in September 12 at Sheffield Snooker Hall.

Team 1	Score	Team 2	Date
Republic of Ireland	2–4	Scotland	

=== Group A ===
Team 1	Score	Team 2	Date
England	4–3	Northern Ireland	
Northern Ireland	1–4	Scotland	
England	4–1	Scotland	

=== Group B ===
Team 1	Score	Team 2	Date
Wales	3–4	Canada	
Canada	4–0	Australia	
Wales	4–1	Australia	

=== Semi-finals ===
Team 1	Score	Team 2	Date
England	4–2	Wales	
Canada	4–0	Scotland	

== Final ==
Final: Best of 7 matches. Hexagon Theatre, Reading, England. 31 October 1982.
Canada; Cliff Thorburn, Kirk Stevens, Bill Werbeniuk	4–2	England; Steve Davis, Jimmy White, Tony Knowles
Thorburn v Knowles: 9–120, 43–83; Werbeniuk v Davis: 76–8, 43–67, 66–54; Stevens v White: 31–73, 69–51, 70–67; Stevens v Knowles: 35–63, 4–89; Werbeniuk v White: 65–15, 80–42; Thorburn v Davis: 86–34, 81–15
55 (Werbeniuk)	Highest break	76 (Knowles)
0	Century breaks	0
2	50+ breaks	2
