= 1996 World Cup =

1996 World Cup may refer to:

- 1996 Cricket World Cup
- 1996 World Cup of Golf
- 1996 World Cup of Hockey
- 1996 World Cup (snooker)
