= 1990 World Cup (disambiguation) =

The 1990 FIFA World Cup was the 14th edition of the FIFA international association football tournament.

1990 World Cup may also refer to:

- 1990 Men's Hockey World Cup
- 1990 Women's Hockey World Cup
- 1990 Alpine Skiing World Cup
- 1990 World Cup (snooker)
