= 1987 World Cup =

1987 World Cup may refer to:

- 1987 Cricket World Cup
- 1987 World Cup (men's golf)
- 1987 Rugby World Cup
- 1987 World Cup (snooker)
