= 1987 World Cup (snooker) =

Snooker tournament

1987 Tuborg World Cup
- Event programme

Tournament information
- Dates: 18–21 March 1987
- Venue: Bournemouth International Centre
- City: Bournemouth
- Country: England
- Format: Non-ranking event
- Total prize fund: £100,000
- Winner's share: £32,000
- Highest break: Terry Griffiths 113

Final
- Champion: (Northern Ireland) (Republic of Ireland) Ireland "A": Dennis Taylor; Alex Higgins; Eugene Hughes
- Runner-up: Canada: Cliff Thorburn; Kirk Stevens; Bill Werbeniuk
- Score: 9–2

The 1987 Snooker World Cup was a professional snooker tournament played at the Bournemouth International Centre, England, between 18 and 21 March 1987 for teams of three players. The event was the eighth iteration of the World Cup snooker tournament, first played in 1979 as the World Challenge Cup. A total prize fund of £100,000 was awarded for the event, with the winning team receiving a share of £32,000. The event featured eight participating teams, including two from Ireland, the champions of the previous year's event. Danish brewery company Tuborg were the sponsors for the tournament.

The defending champions, the Ireland "A" side of Dennis Taylor, Alex Higgins and Eugene Hughes met the Canadian team of Cliff Thorburn, Kirk Stevens and Bill Werbeniuk in the final for the second year in a row. The Irish team won the final 9–2 and their third straight championship, having also won the event in 1985 and 1986.

== Format ==
The 1987 World Cup was a professional snooker non-ranking tournament held 18–21 March 1987. The event was hosted at the Bournemouth International Centre in Bournemouth, England, and featured eight national teams each comprising three players. The tournament organisers, the World Professional Billiards and Snooker Association had wanted to change the format to remove the national basis of the teams and invite the top 24 players in the snooker world rankings. This idea was put aside after top-ranked player Steve Davis said he would not participate in tournament if it was run under the proposed new format. Brewers Tuborg sponsored the event.

Matches in the first round and semi-finals were held as the best of nine frames. One player from each team played two frames against each other. Then two different players played two frames, and then the third players from each team played two frames. After this, a selected player from each team would play a further one or two frames. At 4–4, a single deciding frame would be played, with the participants nominated by the team captains.

The final was held as the best of 17 frames. The first six frames were contested with each player from each team playing two frames against each other, and then a nominated player from each team playing a further two frames, for total of eight frames contested in both sessions. If, following 16 frames, the score was tied 8–8, a nominated player from each team would play in a deciding frame. As champions in the previous year, Ireland were entitled to enter two teams, denoted "A" and "B". The first round matches were played on 18 and 19 March, whilst the semi-finals were played on 20 March and the final was held on 21 March.

=== Prize fund ===
Prize money was awarded as follows:

- Quarter-finals: £6,000 per team
- Semi-finals: £10,000 per team
- Runners-up: £20,000 per team
- Winners: £32,000 per team
- Highest break: £4,000

=== Teams ===
Teams comprised three players representing national teams. As defending champions, Ireland were seeded first, and were allowed to enter a second team. All other nations were seeded depending on combined world ranking. Below is a list of teams that competed:

Country	Seed	Player 1 (Captain)	Player 2	Player 3
(Northern Ireland) (Republic of Ireland) Ireland "A"	1	Dennis Taylor	Alex Higgins	Eugene Hughes
England	2	Steve Davis	Joe Johnson	Tony Meo
Canada	3	Cliff Thorburn	Kirk Stevens	Bill Werbeniuk
Wales	4	Terry Griffiths	Doug Mountjoy	Ray Reardon
Australia	5	John Campbell	Eddie Charlton	Warren King
Rest of the World	6	(South Africa) Silvino Francisco	(Malta) Tony Drago	(New Zealand) Dene O'Kane
Scotland	7	Murdo MacLeod	Stephen Hendry	Matt Gibson
(Northern Ireland) (Republic of Ireland) Ireland "B"	8	Patsy Fagan	Tommy Murphy	Paddy Browne

== Summary ==
=== First round ===
The first round was held as the best-of-9-frame matches on 18 and 19 March. In the first match, Australia against Wales, Eddie Charlton won the first frame against Ray Reardon, but Reardon won the second, and then Doug Mountjoy beat Warren King 2–0, and Terry Griffiths beat John Campbell 2–0 to give Wales a 5–1 win. As champions in the previous year, Ireland were entitled to enter two teams. The two teams played each other in the first round, with Ireland A taking a 4–0 lead as Eugene Hughes beat Paddy Browne and Alex Higgins beat Patsy Fagan, both 2–0. Tommy Murphy of Ireland B then won a frame against Dennis Taylor before Taylor won the last to seal a 5–1 victory for Ireland A.

In Canada's match against the "Rest of World Team", Kirk Stevens beat Silvino Francisco 2–0, Cliff Thorburn drew 1–1 with Tony Drago, and then Bill Werbeniuk lost 0–2 to Dene O'Kane to tie the scores at 3–3. Stevens then drew 1–1 with Drago to make it 4–4, and Thorburn beat Francisco in the tie-break frame so that Canada won 5–4. Steve Davis and Tony Meo arrived at the venue only about 15 minutes before the start of England's match against Scotland, having travelled from Cheltenham Racecourse that day, with part of the journey by helicopter. Joe Johnson and Stephen Hendry shared the first two frames 1–1, then Davis and Meo recorded 2–0 victories over Matt Gibson and Murdo MacLeod respectively to finish the match at 5–1 to England.

=== Semi-finals ===
The semi-finals were both played on 20 March as best-of-9-frames. Griffiths scored breaks of 113 and 92 in beating Taylor and giving Wales a 2–0 lead over Ireland A. Hughes defeated Reardon 2–0 to level the match at 2–2. Higgins beat Mountjoy 2–0, then Griffiths 1–0, to give Ireland the win at 5–2. Canada won 5–4 against England. Stevens and Johnson drew 1–1, Thorburn beat Davis 2–0, Werbeniuk and Meo drew 1–1, and Stevens lost 0–2 to Davis, making the match level at 4–4. In the deciding frame, Thorburn beat Johnson 69–24. Griffiths' 113 break was the highest of the tournament.

=== Final ===
The final was played on 21 March as a best-of-17-frames match over two sessions. Ireland A won 9–2, having beaten Canada 9–7 in the final the previous year. Hughes shared the first two frames with Stevens, then there were 2–0 victories for Higgins over Thorburn and Taylor over Werbeniuk. Following this, Taylor beat Stevens 2–0 to give Ireland A a lead of 7–1 at the end of the afternoon session. In the evening session, Hughes and Stevens played to another 1–1 result. Taylor then beat Thorburn 76–29 to leave Ireland A the winners at 9 frames to 2. The Irish team's victory was their third consecutive triumph in the tournament, having won it in each of the previous two years. One of Taylor's frames against Stevens was won after Taylor obtained the two snookers he required. Higgins finished the tournament with a record of 26 frames won out of 30 played over three editions of the competition.

== Main draw ==
Teams in bold denote match winners.

First Round; Best of 9 Frames
1	(Northern Ireland) (Republic of Ireland) **Ireland A**	**5**
8	(Northern Ireland) (Republic of Ireland) Ireland B	1
5	Australia	1
4	**Wales**	**5**
3	**Canada**	**5**
6	Rest of the World	4
7	Scotland	1
2	**England**	**5**

Semi-finals; Best of 9 Frames
1	(Northern Ireland) (Republic of Ireland) **Ireland A**	**5**
4	Wales	2
3	**Canada**	**5**
2	England	4

Final; Best of 17 Frames
1	(Northern Ireland) (Republic of Ireland) **Ireland A**	**9**
3	Canada	2

=== Final ===
The final was a best-of-17 frames match, held over two sessions.

Final: Best of 17 frames. Referees: John Williams and John Street; Bournemouth International Centre, Bournemouth, England. 21 March 1987.
**(Northern Ireland) (Republic of Ireland) Ireland "A"**; Dennis Taylor; Alex Higgins; Eugene Hughes	**9**–2	**Canada**; Cliff Thorburn; Kirk Stevens; Bill Werbeniuk
Hughes v Stevens: 1–1 (**61**–36, 45–**90**), Natch score 1–1; Higgins v Thorburn: 2–0 (**64**–48, **58**–49), Match score 3–1; Taylor v Werbeniuk: 2–0 (**66**–42, **65**–10), Match score 5–1; Taylor v Stevens: 2–0 (**61**–5, **74**–73), Match score 7–1; Hughes v Stevens: 1–1 (**71**–43, 42–**70**), Match score 8–2; Taylor v Thorburn: 1–0 (**76**–29), Match score **9**–2
