= 1989 World Cup =

1989 World Cup may refer to:

- 1989 World Cup (men's golf)
- 1989 World Cup (snooker)
- 1989 IAAF World Cup
