= 1986 World Cup (disambiguation) =

The 1986 World Cup was the 13th edition of the FIFA international association football tournament.

1986 World Cup may also refer to:

- 1986 Men's Hockey World Cup
- 1986 Women's Hockey World Cup
- 1986 World Cup (snooker)
