= 1985 World Cup =

1985 World Cup may refer to:

- 1985 World Cup (men's golf)
- 1985 World Cup (snooker)
- 1985 IAAF World Cup
