= Jim Donnelly (snooker player) =

Scottish snooker player and coach (1946–2026)

Personal information
- Born: 13 June 1946 Edinburgh, Scotland
- Died: 24 February 2026 (aged 79) Glasgow, Scotland

Sport
- Country: Scotland
- Sport: Snooker
- Professional: 1981–1997
- Highest ranking: 29 (1982–83)
- Best ranking finish: Last 16 (x1)

Jim Donnelly (13 June 1946 – 24 February 2026) was a Scottish professional snooker player and coach.

== Biography ==
Donnelly won the Scottish Amateur Snooker Championship in 1978, beating Eddie McLaughlin 6–4 in the final. He was accepted by the World Professional Billiards and Snooker Association (WPBSA) as a professional in 1981.

He defeated fellow Scottish players Matt Gibson and Eddie Sinclair, both with a scoreline of 9–8, in the qualifying competition for the 1982 World Snooker Championship and became the first Scottish player to qualify for the main stage of the World Championship at the Crucible Theatre. He lost 10–5 in the first round to Ray Reardon. Donnelly was placed 29th in the world rankings for the 1982–83 snooker season, a career high.

He reached the final of the 1987 Scottish Professional Championship by beating Murdo MacLeod and Sinclair, but finished runner-up as he was defeated 10–7 by Stephen Hendry in the final. His best performance in a ranking tournament was reaching the last 16 of the 1983 International Open. He was a member of the Scotland team in the 1982 World Team Classic and in the World Cup for Snooker in 1985, 1986 and 1989.

After his professional career finished in 1997, Donnelly coached players including John Higgins, Alan McManus and Anthony McGill, and also worked as a fitness instructor.

Donnelly died on 24 February 2026, at the age of 79. In his obituary in Snooker Scene, Marcus Stead wote that Donnelly was "known for his shrewd snooker mind and his sense of fun."
