= World Cup (snooker) =

Snooker world cup

Tournament information
- Location: Wuxi
- Country: China
- Established: 1979
- Organisation(s): World Professional Billiards and Snooker Association
- Format: Non-Ranking team event
- Total prize fund: $800,000
- Current champion: Scotland; John Higgins; Stephen Maguire

The World Cup is an invitational team snooker tournament created by Mike Watterson. The contests featured between 6 and 24 teams representing their country, each team comprising three players up to 1996, and two players since 2011. The Snooker World Cup has been held 16 times, annually from 1979 to 1990 (missing 1984), in 1996 and 2011, then 2015, 2017 and 2019.

== History ==
The event began in 1979 as the World Challenge Cup with the sponsorship of State Express. It was held at the Haden Hill Leisure Centre, Birmingham, with six teams participating: England, Northern Ireland, Wales, Canada, Australia and Rest of the World. The teams were broken into two round-robin groups and the matches were best of 15 frames. The top teams in the groups met in the final. In 1980 the tournament moved to the New London Theatre and the Northern Ireland team was replaced by an All-Ireland team.

The event was renamed to the World Team Classic in 1981 and moved to the Hexagon Theatre in Reading. The matches were reduced to best of seven and the top two teams from the groups advanced to the semi-finals. This time seven teams competed. Team Rest of the World were replaced by Team Scotland and instead of an All-Ireland team both the Republic of Ireland and Northern Ireland fielded teams. After the 1983 event State Express ended their sponsorship of the event and the tournament's place in the snooker calendar was taken by the Grand Prix.

The event was moved to spring for the 1984/1985 season and the event was renamed the World Cup. It was held at the International, Bournemouth. The tournament also became a knock-out contest and featured eight teams. Ireland and Northern Ireland fielded a combined team, known as All-Ireland, the Rest of the World team returned and the defending champions, England, had two teams. The event was terminated after the 1990 event.

The event was briefly revived for 1996 and it was held at the Amari Watergate Hotel in Bangkok, Thailand. There were many entries and qualification was held. The 20 qualified teams were split into four groups of five and the top two teams of the groups advanced to the quarter-finals.

On 22 March 2011 it was revealed that the World Professional Billiards and Snooker Association planned to revive the event with the sponsorship of PTT and EGAT. It was held between 11 and 17 July at the Bangkok Convention Centre, Bangkok and twenty two-men teams participated at the tournament.

The World Cup was held every two years between 2015 and 2019, but has not been held since. The 2015, 2017 and 2019 World Cups were all held in Wuxi, a Chinese city near Shanghai.

== Winners ==
Of the 16 World Cups, 8 have been won by British teams (England 4, Wales 2 and Scotland 2), Irish teams 3 times, Chinese teams 3 times, and Canada 2 times.

Steve Davis has won the event more times than any other player, being in the England team for all of England's four wins.

Year	Winners		Runners-up		Final score	Host city	Season
Year	Team	Players	Team	Players	Final score	Host city	Season
World Challenge Cup (team event)
1979	Wales	(Wales) Ray Reardon (Wales) Terry Griffiths (Wales) Doug Mountjoy	England	(England) Fred Davis (England) John Spencer (England) Graham Miles	14–3	(England) Birmingham	1979/80
1980	Wales	(Wales) Ray Reardon (Wales) Terry Griffiths (Wales) Doug Mountjoy	Canada	(Canada) Cliff Thorburn (Canada) Kirk Stevens (Canada) Bill Werbeniuk	8–5	(England) London	1980/81
World Team Classic (team event)
1981	England	(England) Steve Davis (England) John Spencer (England) David Taylor	Wales	(Wales) Ray Reardon (Wales) Terry Griffiths (Wales) Doug Mountjoy	4–3	(England) Reading	1981/82
1982	Canada	(Canada) Cliff Thorburn (Canada) Kirk Stevens (Canada) Bill Werbeniuk	England	(England) Steve Davis (England) Tony Knowles (England) Jimmy White	4–2	(England) Reading	1982/83
1983	England	(England) Steve Davis (England) Tony Knowles (England) Tony Meo	Wales	(Wales) Ray Reardon (Wales) Terry Griffiths (Wales) Doug Mountjoy	4–2	(England) Reading	1983/84
World Cup (team event)
1985	Ireland (All)	(Northern Ireland) Alex Higgins (Northern Ireland) Dennis Taylor (Republic of Ireland) Eugene Hughes	England A	(England) Steve Davis (England) Tony Knowles (England) Tony Meo	9–7	(England) Bournemouth	1984/85
1986	Ireland A	(Northern Ireland) Alex Higgins (Northern Ireland) Dennis Taylor (Republic of Ireland) Eugene Hughes	Canada	(Canada) Cliff Thorburn (Canada) Kirk Stevens (Canada) Bill Werbeniuk	9–7	(England) Bournemouth	1985/86
1987	Ireland A	(Northern Ireland) Alex Higgins (Northern Ireland) Dennis Taylor (Republic of Ireland) Eugene Hughes	Canada	(Canada) Cliff Thorburn (Canada) Kirk Stevens (Canada) Bill Werbeniuk	9–2	(England) Bournemouth	1986/87
1988	England	(England) Steve Davis (England) Jimmy White (England) Neal Foulds	Australia	(Australia) Eddie Charlton (Australia) John Campbell (Australia) Warren King	9–7	(England) Bournemouth	1987/88
1989	England	(England) Steve Davis (England) Jimmy White (England) Neal Foulds	Rest of the World	(South Africa) Silvino Francisco (New Zealand) Dene O'Kane (Malta) Tony Drago	9–8	(England) Bournemouth	1988/89
1990	Canada	(Canada) Cliff Thorburn (Canada) Alain Robidoux (Canada) Bob Chaperon	Northern Ireland	(Northern Ireland) Alex Higgins (Northern Ireland) Dennis Taylor (Northern Ireland) Tommy Murphy	9–5	(England) Bournemouth	1989/90
1996	Scotland	(Scotland) Stephen Hendry (Scotland) John Higgins (Scotland) Alan McManus	Republic of Ireland	(Republic of Ireland) Ken Doherty (Republic of Ireland) Fergal O'Brien (Republic of Ireland) Stephen Murphy	10–7	(Thailand) Bangkok	1996/97
2011	China	(China) Ding Junhui (China) Liang Wenbo	Northern Ireland	(Northern Ireland) Mark Allen (Northern Ireland) Gerard Greene	4–2	(Thailand) Bangkok	2011/12
2015	China B	(China) Yan Bingtao (China) Zhou Yuelong	Scotland	(Scotland) John Higgins (Scotland) Stephen Maguire	4–1	(China) Wuxi	2015/16
2017	China A	(China) Ding Junhui (China) Liang Wenbo	England	(England) Judd Trump (England) Barry Hawkins	4–3	(China) Wuxi	2017/18
2019	Scotland	(Scotland) John Higgins (Scotland) Stephen Maguire	China B	(China) Zhou Yuelong (China) Liang Wenbo	4–0	(China) Wuxi	2019/20

== See also ==
- Nations Cup (snooker)
