= 1989 World Cup (snooker) =

Fersina Windows World Cup
Tournament information
- Dates: 21–24 March 1989
- Venue: Bournemouth International Centre
- City: Bournemouth
- Country: England
- Format: Non-ranking event
- Total prize fund: £135,000
- Winner's share: £43,200
- Highest break: 96, Silvino Francisco

Final
- Champion: England
- Runner-up: Rest of the World
- Score: 9–8

The 1989 Snooker World Cup was a team snooker tournament played at the Bournemouth International Centre.

England went on to win their record fourth title with the same players from last year Steve Davis, Jimmy White and Neal Foulds beat a Rest of the World team with South Africa's Silvino Francisco, New Zealand's Dene O'Kane and Malta's Tony Drago who were 5–8 behind to finish in a final frame encounter between Davis and O'Kane which ended in a re-spotted black.

Franscisco made the highest break of the tournament, 96, during the final.

== Main draw ==
=== Teams ===
Country	Player 1 (Captain)	Player 2	Player 3
England	Steve Davis	Jimmy White	Neal Foulds
Wales	Terry Griffiths	Doug Mountjoy	Cliff Wilson
Rest of the World	(South Africa) Silvino Francisco	(Malta) Tony Drago	(New Zealand) Dene O'Kane
Northern Ireland	Dennis Taylor	Alex Higgins	Tommy Murphy
Canada	Cliff Thorburn	Kirk Stevens	Bob Chaperon
Australia	Eddie Charlton	John Campbell	Warren King
Scotland	Stephen Hendry	Murdo MacLeod	Jim Donnelly
Ireland	Eugene Hughes	Paddy Browne	Anthony Kearney

Quarter-finals; Best of 9 Frames
England	5
Republic of Ireland	1
Northern Ireland	1
Canada	5
Australia	2
Rest of the World	5
Wales	5
Scotland	3

Semi-finals; Best of 9 Frames
England	5
Canada	2
Rest of the World	5
Wales	3

Final; Best of 17 Frames
England	9
Rest of the World	8

== Final ==
Final: Best of 17 frames. Referees: Bournemouth International Centre, Bournemouth, England. 24 March 1989.
England; Steve Davis, Jimmy White, Neal Foulds	9–8	Rest of the World; Dene O'Kane, Silvino Francisco, Tony Drago
Davis v Drago: 1–1 (25–67, 68–26); Foulds v O'Kane: 2–0 (70–41, 71–45); White v Francisco: 1–1 (52-84, 69-37); White v Francisco: 0–2 (22-75, 24-75); White v Drago: 1–1 (0-75, 68-67); Davis v O'Kane: 2–0 (96-16, 92-27); Foulds v Francisco: 1–1 (65-56, 7-136); Foulds v Drago: 0–2 (0-84, 29-65); Davis v O'Kane: 1–0 (72–55)
