= 2015 World Cup (snooker) =

World Cup
Tournament information
- Dates: 15–21 June 2015
- Venue: Wuxi City Sports Park Stadium
- City: Wuxi
- Country: China
- Organisation: WPBSA
- Format: Non-ranking team event
- Total prize fund: $800,000
- Winner's share: $200,000
- Highest break: 137

Final
- Champion: China B Zhou Yuelong; Yan Bingtao
- Runner-up: Scotland; John Higgins; Stephen Maguire
- Score: 4–1

The 2015 Nongfu Spring World Cup was a professional non-ranking team snooker tournament that took place from 15 to 21 June 2015 at the Wuxi City Sports Park Stadium in Wuxi, China. It was the 14th edition of the event, and it was televised live by Eurosport.

== Teams and players ==
Seed	Nation	Player 1	Player 2
1	China A	Ding Junhui	Xiao Guodong
2	England	Mark Selby	Stuart Bingham
3	Australia	Neil Robertson	Vinnie Calabrese
4	Hong Kong	Marco Fu	Au Chi-wai
5	Scotland	John Higgins	Stephen Maguire
6	Wales	Mark Williams	Michael White
7	Ireland	Ken Doherty	Fergal O'Brien
8	Norway	Kurt Maflin	Anita Maflin
	Singapore	Marvin Lim Chun Kiat	KK Chan
	Iran	Hossein Vafaei	Ehsan Heydari Nezhad
	Pakistan	Hamza Akbar	Muhammad Sajjad
	China B	Zhou Yuelong	Yan Bingtao
	India	Aditya Mehta	Pankaj Advani
	Malaysia	Rory Thor	Mohd Reza Hassan
	Qatar	Ahmed Saif	Ali Alobaidaly
	Thailand	Dechawat Poomjaeng	Thepchaiya Un-Nooh
	Malta	Tony Drago	Alex Borg
	Brazil	Igor Figueiredo	Itaro Santos
	Poland	Mateusz Baranowski	Adam Stefanow
	United Arab Emirates	Khalid Alkamali	Mohamed Shehab
	Austria	Andreas Ploner	Paul Schopf
	Belgium	Luca Brecel	Tomasz Skalski
	Northern Ireland	Gerard Greene	Joe Swail
	Germany	Lukas Kleckers	Felix Frede

== Prize fund ==
- Winner: $200,000
- Runner-Up: $100,000
- Semi-final: $60,000
- Quarter-final: $40,000
- Third in group: $22,500
- Fourth in group: $15,000
- Fifth in group: $10,000
- Sixth in group: $7,500
- Total: $800,000

== Format ==
The 2015 World Cup consisted of 24 national teams, with two players competing for each side, and the initial round divided the entrants into four pools of six sides apiece. During the Group Stage, every national team played a best-of-five match against each of the other sides in their pool. Three victories were required to secure a head-to-head team win, but all five individual contests needed to be played, similar to the Davis Cup and Fed Cup formats in professional tennis. All matches were scheduled to include two singles contests, a doubles encounter, and two reverse singles showdowns. The top two teams from each bracket advanced to the Knockout Stages.

During the Quarter-Finals, Semi-Finals, and Championship Final, the remaining national sides were paired off a head-to-head knockout bracket. The format for these head-to-head matches was a sudden death best-of-seven competition, similar to professional sporting events like baseball's World Series and basketball's NBA Finals, with the contest coming to an end as soon as one team accumulated four individual victories. These encounters were scheduled as two singles showdowns, a doubles match, two reverse singles contests, another doubles encounter, and a winner-take-all singles showdown if necessary. The side that won the Final were named champions.

== Group round ==
=== Group A ===
Gameday	Team 1	Score	Team 2	Team 1	Score	Team 2	Team 1	Score	Team 2
15 June 2015	China A	3–2	India	Norway	3–2	Singapore	Malta	5–0	Austria
16 June 2015	China A	5–0	Singapore	Norway	0–5	Malta	India	5–0	Austria
17 June 2015	China A	5–0	Austria	Norway	0–5	India	Singapore	3–2	Malta
18 June 2015	China A	5–0	Norway	India	3–2	Malta	Singapore	2–3	Austria
19 June 2015	China A	3–2	Malta	Norway	4–1	Austria	Singapore	1–4	India

Place	Seed	Team	Games	Frames	Frames won	Frames lost	Difference	Points
1	1	China A	5	25	21	4	17	21
2		India	5	25	19	6	13	19
3		Malta	5	25	16	9	7	16
4		Singapore	5	25	8	17	−9	8
5	8	Norway	5	25	7	18	−11	7
6		Austria	5	25	4	21	−17	4

=== Group B ===
Gameday	Team 1	Score	Team 2	Team 1	Score	Team 2	Team 1	Score	Team 2
15 June 2015	Hong Kong	3–2	Malaysia	Scotland	4–1	Iran	Brazil	2–3	Belgium
16 June 2015	Hong Kong	3–2	Iran	Scotland	2–3	Brazil	Malaysia	0–5	Belgium
17 June 2015	Hong Kong	2–3	Belgium	Scotland	4–1	Malaysia	Iran	1–4	Brazil
18 June 2015	Hong Kong	1–4	Scotland	Malaysia	1–4	Brazil	Iran	2–3	Belgium
19 June 2015	Hong Kong	5–0	Brazil	Scotland	2–3	Belgium	Iran	4–1	Malaysia

Place	Seed	Team	Games	Frames	Frames won	Frames lost	Difference	Points
1		Belgium	5	25	17	8	9	17
2	5	Scotland	5	25	16	9	7	16
3	4	Hong Kong	5	25	14	11	3	14
4		Brazil	5	25	13	12	1	13
5		Iran	5	25	10	15	−5	10
6		Malaysia	5	25	5	20	−15	5

=== Group C ===
Gameday	Team 1	Score	Team 2	Team 1	Score	Team 2	Team 1	Score	Team 2
15 June 2015	Australia	3–2	Qatar	Wales	5–0	Pakistan	Poland	0–5	Northern Ireland
16 June 2015	Australia	2–3	Pakistan	Wales	4–1	Poland	Qatar	1–4	Northern Ireland
17 June 2015	Australia	3–2	Northern Ireland	Wales	4–1	Qatar	Pakistan	2–3	Poland
18 June 2015	Australia	4–1	Poland	Wales	4–1	Northern Ireland	Pakistan	4–1	Qatar
19 June 2015	Australia	2–3	Wales	Pakistan	4–1	Northern Ireland	Qatar	3–2	Poland

Place	Seed	Team	Games	Frames	Frames won	Frames lost	Difference	Points
1	6	Wales	5	25	20	5	15	20
2	3	Australia	5	25	14	11	3	14
3		Pakistan	5	25	13	12	1	13
4		Northern Ireland	5	25	13	12	1	13
5		Qatar	5	25	8	17	−9	8
6		Poland	5	25	7	18	−11	7

=== Group D ===
Gameday	Team 1	Score	Team 2	Team 1	Score	Team 2	Team 1	Score	Team 2
15 June 2015	England	1–4	Thailand	Ireland	1–4	China B	UAE	2–3	Germany
16 June 2015	England	3–2	China B	Ireland	5–0	UAE	Thailand	3–2	Germany
17 June 2015	England	4–1	Germany	China B	5–0	UAE	Ireland	2–3	Thailand
18 June 2015	England	5–0	UAE	China B	3–2	Thailand	Ireland	4–1	Germany
19 June 2015	England	3–2	Ireland	China B	5–0	Germany	Thailand	4–1	UAE

Place	Seed	Team	Games	Frames	Frames won	Frames lost	Difference	Points
1		China B	5	25	19	6	13	19
2		Thailand	5	25	16	9	7	16
3	2	England	5	25	16	9	7	16
4	7	Ireland	5	25	14	11	3	14
5		Germany	5	25	7	18	−11	7
6		United Arab Emirates	5	25	3	22	−19	3

== Final round ==
Quarterfinals; Best of 7 frames (20 June 2015)
A1	China A	1
B2	Scotland	4
B1	Belgium	1
A2	India	4
C1	Wales	4
D2	Thailand	1
D1	China B	4
C2	Australia	2

Semifinals; Best of 7 frames (21 June 2015)
B2	Scotland	4
A2	India	3
C1	Wales	3
D1	China B	4

Final; Best of 7 frames (21 June 2015)
B2	Scotland	1
D1	China B	4

=== Final ===
Final: Best of 7 frames. Referee: Paul Collier. Wuxi City Sports Park Stadium, Wuxi, China, 21 June 2015.
John Higgins; Stephen Maguire; Scotland	1–4	Zhou Yuelong; Yan Bingtao; China B
0–100 (100), 6–100 (56), 41–69, 67–18, 44–71
37	Highest break	100
0	Century breaks	1
0	50+ breaks	2

== Century breaks ==
There were 10 century breaks in the tournament.

- India – 137 Pankaj Advani
- China B – 134, 100 Yan Bingtao
- Wales – 130, 108 Mark Williams
- Scotland – 122 John Higgins
- Australia – 111 Neil Robertson
- Thailand – 108 Dechawat Poomjaeng
- Brazil – 105 Itaro Santos
- Malta – 105 Tony Drago
