= Stephen Murphy (snooker player) =

Irish snooker player (born 1969)

Personal information
- Born: 23 September 1969 (age 57)

Sport
- Country: Ireland
- Sport: Snooker
- Professional: 1989–1999
- Highest ranking: 50
- Best ranking finish: Last 32 (x9)

Stephen Murphy (born 23 September 1969) is an Irish former professional snooker player. He was part of the Irish team that were runners-up at the 1996 World Cup of snooker.

== Biography ==
Stephen Murphy was born on 23 September 1969. After he first moved to England to pursue a snooker career he lived with his compatriot and fellow-snooker player Eugene Hughes, who was described as his friend and mentor. They practised together at the Ilford Snooker Club.

He became a professional player having finished fourth in the pro-ticket series and defeating Derek Mienie 9–4 in the 1989 professional play-offs. He played on the professional circuit from 1989 to 1999, achieving a highest ranking of 50.

He defeated Dennis Taylor in a run to the last-32 of the 1990 Dubai Classic and defeated John Virgo on his way to the last-32 of the 1991 British Open, before his run was ended by James Wattana. He reached the last-32 of the 1992 World Snooker Championship, where he lost 3–10 to Stephen Hendry.

Murphy represented Ireland at the 1996 World Cup of snooker. Three-man teams with one sub from all over the globe took part at the Armari Watergate Hotel in Bangkok. The Irish team consisted of Murphy along with Ken Doherty, Fergal O'Brien and Michael Judge as sub. Ireland beat Canada to earn a semi-final with England. The England team was made up of Peter Ebdon, Nigel Bond and Ronnie O'Sullivan but lost 10–9. Ireland faced a Scotland team of Hendry, John Higgins and Alan McManus in the final and lost 10–7.

Despite returning to Dublin upon retirement, Murphy would visit to watch his friend Doherty play at future World Championships.
