= 2017 World Cup (snooker) =

World Cup
Tournament information
- Dates: 3–9 July 2017
- Venue: Wuxi City Sports Park Stadium
- City: Wuxi
- Country: China
- Organisation: WPBSA
- Format: Non-ranking team event
- Total prize fund: $800,000
- Winner's share: $200,000
- Highest break: 140

Final
- Champion: China A Ding Junhui; Liang Wenbo
- Runner-up: England; Judd Trump; Barry Hawkins
- Score: 4–3

The 2017 Little Swan World Cup was a professional non-ranking team snooker tournament that took place from 3 to 9 July 2017 at the Wuxi City Sports Park Stadium in Wuxi, China. It was the 15th edition of the event, and was televised live by Eurosport Player and repeated on Eurosport 1.

The China A pair of Ding Junhui and Liang Wenbo won the event, beating the English pair of Judd Trump and Barry Hawkins 4–3 in the final, winning the last three frames. Ding Junhui made a break of 59 in the deciding frame against Judd Trump.

== Teams and players ==
Seed	Nation	Player 1	Player 2
1	China B	Zhou Yuelong	Yan Bingtao
2	Scotland	John Higgins	Anthony McGill
3	England	Judd Trump	Barry Hawkins
4	China A	Ding Junhui	Liang Wenbo
5	Hong Kong	Marco Fu	Au Chi-wai
6	Australia	Neil Robertson	Kurt Dunham
7	Northern Ireland	Mark Allen	Joe Swail
8	Wales	Mark Williams	Ryan Day
	Ireland	Fergal O'Brien	Ken Doherty
	Norway	Kurt Maflin	Christopher Watts
	Thailand	Thepchaiya Un-Nooh	Noppon Saengkham
	Belgium	Luca Brecel	Jeff Jacobs
	India	Aditya Mehta	Brijesh Damani
	Brazil	Igor Figueiredo	Itaro Santos
	Malta	Alex Borg	Duncan Bezzina
	Iran	Hossein Vafaei	Soheil Vahedi
	Malaysia	Thor Chuan Leong	Moh Keen Hoo
	Germany	Lukas Kleckers	Simon Lichtenberg
	Pakistan	Hamza Akbar	Shahram Changezi
	Cyprus	Michael Georgiou	Antonis Poullos
	Switzerland	Alexander Ursenbacher	Darren Paris
	Egypt	Hatem Yassen	Basem Eltahhan
	Israel	Eden Sharav	Shachar Ruberg
	Finland	Robin Hull	Heikki Niva

== Prize fund ==
- Winner: $200,000
- Runner-Up: $100,000
- Semi-final: $60,000
- Quarter-final: $40,000
- Third in group: $22,500
- Fourth in group: $15,000
- Fifth in group: $10,000
- Sixth in group: $7,500
- Total: $800,000

== Format ==
The 2017 World Cup used the same format as that used in 2015. There were 24 national teams, with two players competing for each side, and the initial round divided the entrants into four groups of six. During the Group Stage, every national team played a best-of-five frame match against each of the other sides in their pool. All matches consisted of five frames, two singles, a doubles frame, and two reverse singles. The top two teams from each group advanced to the Knockout Stages, the order being determined by total frames won. If there is a tie in either of the first two places the following rules determine the positions. If two teams are equal, the winner of the match between the two teams will be ranked higher. If three or more teams are tied, a sudden-death blue ball shoot-out will be played. Teams tied for positions 3 to 6 would remain tied and share the prize money for those positions.

During the quarter-finals, semi-finals, and championship final, the eight qualifying team were paired off in a head-to-head knockout. The format for these matches was a best-of-seven frame competition with the contest coming to an end as soon as one team had won four frames. These encounters were scheduled as two singles, a doubles frame, two reverse singles, another doubles frame, and a winner-take-all singles if necessary.

== Group stage ==
=== Group A ===
Date	Team 1	Score	Team 2	Team 1	Score	Team 2	Team 1	Score	Team 2
3 July 2017	China B	4–1	Finland	Wales	5–0	Norway	Malaysia	0–5	Brazil
4 July 2017	China B	3–2	Norway	Wales	3–2	Malaysia	Finland	2–3	Brazil
5 July 2017	China B	4–1	Brazil	Wales	5–0	Finland	Norway	2–3	Malaysia
6 July 2017	China B	1–4	Wales	Norway	2–3	Brazil	Finland	2–3	Malaysia
7 July 2017	China B	3–2	Malaysia	Wales	2–3	Brazil	Norway	2–3	Finland

Place	Seed	Team	Games	Frames	Frames won	Frames lost	Difference	Points
1	8	Wales	5	25	19	6	13	19
2	1	China B	5	25	15	10	5	15
3		Brazil	5	25	15	10	5	15
4		Malaysia	5	25	10	15	−5	10
5		Finland	5	25	8	17	−9	8
6		Norway	5	25	8	17	−9	8

China B finished above Brazil because they won the match between the two teams.

=== Group B ===
Date	Team 1	Score	Team 2	Team 1	Score	Team 2	Team 1	Score	Team 2
3 July 2017	China A	5–0	Ireland	Hong Kong	4–1	Germany	Belgium	4–1	Egypt
4 July 2017	China A	3–2	Germany	Hong Kong	1–4	Belgium	Ireland	3–2	Egypt
5 July 2017	China A	4–1	Egypt	Hong Kong	4–1	Ireland	Germany	1–4	Belgium
6 July 2017	China A	2–3	Belgium	Hong Kong	4–1	Egypt	Germany	2–3	Ireland
7 July 2017	China A	3–2	Hong Kong	Germany	4–1	Egypt	Ireland	3–2	Belgium

Place	Seed	Team	Games	Frames	Frames won	Frames lost	Difference	Points
1		Belgium	5	25	17	8	9	17
2	4	China A	5	25	17	8	9	17
3	5	Hong Kong	5	25	15	10	5	15
4		Ireland	5	25	10	15	−5	10
5		Germany	5	25	10	15	−5	10
6		Egypt	5	25	6	19	−13	6

Belgium finished above China A because they won the match between the two teams.

=== Group C ===
Date	Team 1	Score	Team 2	Team 1	Score	Team 2	Team 1	Score	Team 2
3 July 2017	England	5–0	Switzerland	Australia	2–3	Malta	Pakistan	2–3	Iran
4 July 2017	England	4–1	Malta	Australia	4–1	Pakistan	Switzerland	2–3	Iran
5 July 2017	England	4–1	Iran	Australia	4–1	Switzerland	Malta	3–2	Pakistan
6 July 2017	England	5–0	Pakistan	Australia	1–4	Iran	Malta	1–4	Switzerland
7 July 2017	England	4–1	Australia	Malta	0–5	Iran	Switzerland	2–3	Pakistan

Place	Seed	Team	Games	Frames	Frames won	Frames lost	Difference	Points
1	3	England	5	25	22	3	19	22
2		Iran	5	25	16	9	7	16
3	6	Australia	5	25	12	13	−1	12
4		Switzerland	5	25	9	16	−7	9
5		Malta	5	25	8	17	−9	8
6		Pakistan	5	25	8	17	−9	8

=== Group D ===
Date	Team 1	Score	Team 2	Team 1	Score	Team 2	Team 1	Score	Team 2
3 July 2017	Scotland	2–3	Thailand	Northern Ireland	4–1	Cyprus	India	2–3	Israel
4 July 2017	Scotland	3–2	Cyprus	Northern Ireland	3–2	India	Thailand	3–2	Israel
5 July 2017	Scotland	4–1	Israel	Northern Ireland	3–2	Thailand	Cyprus	1–4	India
6 July 2017	Scotland	2–3	Northern Ireland	Thailand	5–0	India	Cyprus	0–5	Israel
7 July 2017	Scotland	3–2	India	Northern Ireland	3–2	Israel	Cyprus	0–5	Thailand

Place	Seed	Team	Games	Frames	Frames won	Frames lost	Difference	Points
1		Thailand	5	25	18	7	11	18
2	7	Northern Ireland	5	25	16	9	7	16
3	2	Scotland	5	25	14	11	3	14
4		Israel	5	25	13	12	1	13
5		India	5	25	10	15	−5	10
6		Cyprus	5	25	4	21	−17	4

== Knock-out stage ==
Quarter-finals; Best of 7 frames (8 July 2017)
A1	Wales	1
B2	China A	4
D1	Thailand	4
C2	Iran	1
B1	Belgium	3
A2	China B	4
C1	England	4
D2	Northern Ireland	3

Semi-finals; Best of 7 frames (9 July 2017)
B2	China A	4
D1	Thailand	2
A2	China B	3
C1	England	4

Final; Best of 7 frames (9 July 2017)
B2	China A	4
C1	England	3

=== Final ===
Final: Best of 7 frames. Referee: Maike Kesseler. Wuxi City Sports Park Stadium, Wuxi, China, 9 July 2017.
Ding Junhui; Liang Wenbo; China A	4–3	Judd Trump; Barry Hawkins; England
47–70, 76–21 (68), 22–67 (57), 0–72, 70–18 (69), 60–37, 88–4 (59)
69	Highest break	57
0	Century breaks	0
3	50+ breaks	1

== Century breaks ==
There were 14 century breaks made in the tournament.

- Wales – 140 Ryan Day, 109 Mark Williams
- Thailand – 133, 116 Thepchaiya Un-Nooh, 101 Noppon Saengkham
- Northern Ireland – 133, 104 Mark Allen
- Scotland – 130 John Higgins
- Belgium – 121 Luca Brecel
- England – 112 Judd Trump
- China B – 112 Zhou Yuelong
- Australia – 105 Neil Robertson
- Malta – 105 Duncan Bezzina
- Hong Kong – 103 Marco Fu
