= 1979 World Challenge Cup =

State Express World Challenge Cup
Tournament information
- Dates: 20–27 October 1979
- Venue: Haden Hill Leisure Centre
- City: Birmingham
- Country: England
- Format: Non-ranking event
- Total prize fund: £28,000
- Winner's share: £7,500
- Highest break: Cliff Thorburn (CAN), 126

Final
- Champion: Wales
- Runner-up: England
- Score: 14–3

The 1979 World Challenge Cup was the first snooker tournament to have a team format of six nations with three players per team. The event was held between 20 and 27 October 1979 at the Haden Hill Leisure Centre in Birmingham, England.

Cliff Thorburn made the highest break of the tournament, 126.

== Main draw ==
=== Teams ===
Country	Player 1 (Captain)	Player 2	Player 3
England	John Spencer	Fred Davis	Graham Miles
Wales	Terry Griffiths	Ray Reardon	Doug Mountjoy
Northern Ireland	Dennis Taylor	Alex Higgins	Jackie Rea
Canada	Cliff Thorburn	Bill Werbeniuk	Kirk Stevens
Australia	Gary Owen	Paddy Morgan	Ian Anderson
Rest of the World	(South Africa) Perrie Mans	(Republic of Ireland) Patsy Fagan	(South Africa) Jimmy van Rensberg

=== Group A ===
Team 1	Score	Team 2	Date
England	8–7	Rest of the World	
Northern Ireland	8–7	Rest of the World	
England	8–7	Northern Ireland	

=== Group B ===
Team 1	Score	Team 2	Date
Wales	9–6	Canada	
Canada	7–8	Australia	
Wales	9–6	Australia	

== Final ==
Final: Best of 27 frames. Referee: Haden Hill Leisure Centre, Birmingham, England. 26 and 27 October 1979.
Wales; Terry Griffiths, Ray Reardon, Doug Mountjoy	14–3	England; John Spencer, Fred Davis, Graham Miles
109 (Doug Mountjoy)	Highest break	47 (John Spencer)
1	Century breaks	0
6	50+ breaks	0
