= 1986 World Cup (snooker) =

Car Care Plan World Cup
Tournament information
- Dates: 20–23 March 1986
- Venue: Bournemouth International Centre
- City: Bournemouth
- Country: England
- Format: Non-ranking event
- Total prize fund: £100,000
- Winner's share: £33,000
- Highest break: Cliff Thorburn (CAN) (118)

Final
- Champion: (Northern Ireland) (Republic of Ireland) Ireland "A"
- Runner-up: Canada
- Score: 9–7

The 1986 Snooker World Cup was a team snooker tournament played that took place between 20 and 23 March 1986 at the Bournemouth International Centre in Bournemouth, England. Fersina Windows were the sponsors for the next two years. Car Care Plan became the sponsors for this year's tournament.

As champions it was Ireland's turn to be played in 2 separate teams with the team which won the previous year played as Ireland "A" with Dennis Taylor, Alex Higgins and Eugene Hughes and Ireland "B" with Patsy Fagan, Tommy Murphy and Paddy Browne. Ireland "A" went on to beat Canada to retain the title, only the second nation to do so.

== Main draw ==
=== Teams ===
Country	Player 1 (Captain)	Player 2	Player 3
(Northern Ireland) (Republic of Ireland) Ireland "A"	Dennis Taylor	Alex Higgins	Eugene Hughes
England	Steve Davis	Tony Knowles	Jimmy White
Canada	Cliff Thorburn	Kirk Stevens	Bill Werbeniuk
Wales	Ray Reardon	Terry Griffiths	Doug Mountjoy
Australia	Eddie Charlton	John Campbell	Warren King
Scotland	Murdo MacLeod	Eddie Sinclair	Jim Donnelly
(Northern Ireland) (Republic of Ireland) Ireland "B"	Patsy Fagan	Tommy Murphy	Paddy Browne
Rest of the World	(Malta) Tony Drago	(Thailand) Sakchai Sim Ngam	(India) Omprakesh Agrawal

Quarter-finals; Best of 9 Frames
(Northern Ireland) (Republic of Ireland) Ireland "A"	5
(Northern Ireland) (Republic of Ireland) Ireland "B"	0
Wales	5
Scotland	1
England	5
Australia	2
Canada	5
Rest of the World	0

Semi-finals; Best of 9 Frames
(Northern Ireland) (Republic of Ireland) Ireland "A"	5
Wales	2
England	3
Canada	5

Final; Best of 17 Frames
(Northern Ireland) (Republic of Ireland) Ireland "A"	9
Canada	7

== Final ==
Final: Best of 17 frames. Referee: Bournemouth International Centre, Bournemouth, England. 23 March 1986.
(Northern Ireland) (Republic of Ireland) Ireland "A"; Dennis Taylor, Alex Higgins, Eugene Hughes	9–7	Canada; Cliff Thorburn, Kirk Stevens, Bill Werbeniuk
Dennis Taylor v Cliff Thorburn: 1–1 (87–39, 8–118) – Match Score: 1–1; Eugene Hughes v Kirk Stevens: 0–2 (40–75, 58–68) – Match Score: 1–3; Alex Higgins v Bill Werbeniuk: 2–0 (77-38, 76–20 ) – Match Score: 3–3; Alex Higgins v Kirk Stevens: 1-1 (68–67, 30–64) – Match Score: 4–4; Alex Higgins v Cliff Thorburn: 1-1 (21–61, 70–69) – Match Score: 5–5; Eugene Hughes v Kirk Stevens: 1–1 (48–62, 74–18) – Match Score: 6–6; Dennis Taylor v Bill Werbeniuk: 2–0 (81–0, 93–0) – Match Score: 8–6; Dennis Taylor v Cliff Thorburn: 1-1 (53–63, 68–12) – Match Score: 9–7
	Highest break	
	Century breaks	
	50+ breaks	
