= 1985 World Cup (snooker) =

Guinness World Cup
Tournament information
- Dates: 20–23 March 1985
- Venue: Bournemouth International Centre
- City: Bournemouth
- Country: England
- Format: Non-ranking event
- Total prize fund: £125,000
- Winner's share: £40,000
- Highest break: 97 Tony Knowles

Final
- Champion: (Northern Ireland) (Republic of Ireland) All Ireland
- Runner-up: England "A"
- Score: 9–7

The 1985 Snooker World Cup sponsored by KitKat was a team snooker tournament with a revamped format. Gone was the round-robin system which had been in place since the first one in 1979 and the tournament was now a knock-out format with eight teams. It moved from October to March as the new Grand Prix tournament now took its old slot in the snooker calendar which was also played at the previous venue, the Hexagon Theatre in Reading. Guinness became the first of many sponsors for the next few years after British American Tobacco, under its trade name State Express, pulled out of all sport sponsorship in Great Britain. This new competition was now played at the new Bournemouth International Centre.

England now played in two teams, with the defending champions competing as "England A" with the same players (Steve Davis, Tony Knowles and Tony Meo) while Jimmy White, Willie Thorne and John Spencer competed as "England B". The two Irish jurisdictions competed as "All-Ireland" and, for the first time since 1980, a "Rest of the World" team played with Silvino Francisco, Dene O'Kane and American pool player Jim Rempe (who also competed in 1980). Eventually, All-Ireland won the title, beating "England A" in a 17-frame final.

== Main draw ==
=== Teams ===
Country	Player 1 (Captain)	Player 2	Player 3
England "A"	Steve Davis	Tony Knowles	Tony Meo
Wales	Ray Reardon	Terry Griffiths	Doug Mountjoy
England "B"	Jimmy White	Willie Thorne	John Spencer
(Northern Ireland) (Republic of Ireland) All-Ireland	Alex Higgins	Dennis Taylor	Eugene Hughes
Canada	Cliff Thorburn	Kirk Stevens	Bill Werbeniuk
Australia	Eddie Charlton	John Campbell	Warren King
Scotland	Murdo MacLeod	Eddie Sinclair	Jim Donnelly
Rest of the World	(South Africa) Silvino Francisco	(New Zealand) Dene O'Kane	(United States) Jim Rempe

Quarter-finals; Best of 9 Frames
England "A"	5
Scotland	4
England "B"	5
Rest of the World	2
Canada	2
(Northern Ireland) (Republic of Ireland) All-Ireland	5
Australia	4
Wales	5

Semi-finals; Best of 9 Frames
England "A"	5
England "B"	2
(Northern Ireland) (Republic of Ireland) All-Ireland	5
Wales	3

Final; Best of 17 Frames
England "A"	7
(Northern Ireland) (Republic of Ireland) All-Ireland	9

== Final ==
Final: Best of 17 frames. Referee: John Street; Bournemouth International Centre, Bournemouth, England. 23 March 1985.
(Northern Ireland) (Republic of Ireland) All-Ireland; Dennis Taylor, Alex Higgins, Eugene Hughes	9–7	England "A"; Steve Davis, Tony Knowles, Tony Meo
Afternoon: Dennis Taylor v Tony Knowles: 1–1 (37-75, 65-64) – Match Score: 1–1; Eugene Hughes v Steve Davis: 0–2 (27-96, 26-68) – Match Score: 1–3; Alex Higgins v Tony Meo: 1–1 (48-60, 78-26) – Match Score: 2–4; Dennis Taylor v Tony Knowles: 1–1 (81-18, 1-74) – Match Score: 3–5 Evening: Dennis Taylor v Steve Davis: 1–1 (66–52, 1–82) – Match Score: 4–6; Eugene Hughes v Tony Knowles: 1–1 (102-29, 18-99) – Match Score: 5–7; Alex Higgins v Tony Meo: 2–0 (104-54, 82-23) – Match Score: 7–7; Alex Higgins v Steve Davis: 2–0 (109-1, 73-31) – Match Score: 9–7
	Highest break	
	Century breaks	
	50+ breaks	
