= 1996 World Cup (snooker) =

Castrol-Honda World Cup
Tournament information
- Dates: 29 October – 10 November 1996
- Venue: Armari Watergate Hotel
- City: Bangkok
- Country: Thailand
- Format: Non-ranking event
- Total prize fund: £400,000
- Winner's share: £105,000
- Highest break: (Scotland) John Higgins 139

Final
- Champion: Scotland
- Runner-up: Republic of Ireland
- Score: 10–7

The 1996 Snooker World Cup was a team snooker tournament which returned after a six-year absence. With the increasing rise of snooker in some countries, This new version has 20 teams in the championship and it was played in Bangkok in Thailand. Scotland's 'Dream Team' with Stephen Hendry, Alan McManus and John Higgins were strong favourites to win from the start and they did so by beating Republic of Ireland with Ken Doherty, Fergal O'Brien and Stephen Murphy to win their only World Cup. Higgins got the highest break of the tournament with a 139 in his semi-final match against Thailand's Tai Pichit. The tournament was a success but hosting the event had become too costly that the event was withdrawn afterward.

== Main draw ==
=== Teams ===
Country	Player 1 (Captain)	Player 2	Player 3
Scotland	Stephen Hendry	Alan McManus	John Higgins
England	Peter Ebdon	Ronnie O'Sullivan	Nigel Bond
Wales	Darren Morgan	Mark Williams	Anthony Davies
Northern Ireland	Dennis Taylor	Joe Swail	Terry Murphy
Ireland	Ken Doherty	Fergal O'Brien	Stephen Murphy
Canada	Cliff Thorburn	Alain Robidoux	Jim Wych
Malta	Tony Drago	Alex Borg	Joe Grech
Thailand	James Wattana	Noppadon Noppachorn	Tai Pichit
Australia	Robby Foldvari	Quinten Hann	Stan Gorski
Pakistan	Shokat Ali	Farhan Mirza	Saleh Mohammad
South Africa	Silvino Francisco	Hitesh Naran	Munier Cassim
New Zealand	Dene O'Kane	Mark Canovan	Daniel Haenga
Belgium	Bjorn Haneveer	Mario Geudens	Patrick Delsemme
Hong Kong	Kong Wahorn	Chan Wai Tat	Paul Fung
Singapore	Keith Boon	Bernard Tey	Ang Chiok Hong
China	Guo Hua	Pang Weiguo	Tao Shan
United Arab Emirates	Masood Akil	Mohammed Shehab	Mohammed Al Joker
Iceland	Kristján Helgason	Johannes Johannesson	Edvard Matthiasson
Malaysia	Sam Chong	Ng Ann Seng	Yong Kien Foot
Netherlands	Raymond Fabrie	Mario Wehrmann	Johan Oenema

Darren Morgan was later replaced by Mark Bennett after the death of his mother.

The two best teams from each group advanced to the quarter-finals.

=== Group A ===
Team 1	Score	Team 2	Date
Belgium	6–3	Iceland	
Republic of Ireland	6–3	New Zealand	
Northern Ireland	6–3	Iceland	
Republic of Ireland	7–2	Belgium	
Northern Ireland	4–5	Belgium	
New Zealand	5–4	Iceland	
Republic of Ireland	4–5	Northern Ireland	
New Zealand	5–4	Belgium	
Republic of Ireland	7–2	Iceland	
Northern Ireland	6–3	New Zealand	

=== Group B ===
Team 1	Score	Team 2	Date
Hong Kong	2–7	Singapore	
Canada	8–1	South Africa	
Scotland	9–0	Singapore	
Hong Kong	7–2	South Africa	
Scotland	6–3	South Africa	
Canada	8–1	Singapore	
Canada	7–2	Hong Kong	
South Africa	5–4	Singapore	
Scotland	6–3	Canada	
Scotland	8–1	Hong Kong	

=== Group C ===
Team 1	Score	Team 2	Date
Thailand	4–5	China	
England	8–1	United Arab Emirates	
China	4–5	United Arab Emirates	
Thailand	6–3	Pakistan	
England	5–4	China	
England	6–3	Thailand	
Pakistan	8–1	United Arab Emirates	
Pakistan	7–2	China	
Thailand	9–0	United Arab Emirates	
England	6–3	Pakistan	

=== Group D ===
Team 1	Score	Team 2	Date
Australia	6–3	Netherlands	
Malta	6–3	Malaysia	
Wales	6–3	Netherlands	
Australia	5–4	Malta	
Wales	8–1	Malaysia	
Malta	4–5	Netherlands	
Wales	7–2	Australia	
Netherlands	6–3	Malaysia	
Wales	5–4	Malta	
Australia	6–3	Malaysia	

Quarter-finals; Best of 19 Frames
Scotland	10
Northern Ireland	6
Wales	9
Thailand	10
England	10
Australia	5
Republic of Ireland	10
Canada	6

Semi-finals; Best of 19 Frames
Scotland	10
Thailand	5
England	9
Republic of Ireland	10

Final; Best of 19 Frames
Scotland	10
Republic of Ireland	7

== Final ==
Final: Best of 19 frames. Referees: Amari Watergate Hotel, Bangkok, Thailand. 10 November 1996.
Scotland; Stephen Hendry, Alan McManus, John Higgins	10–7	Ireland; Ken Doherty, Fergal O'Brien, Stephen Murphy
Hendry v O'Brien: 84–4; McManus v Murphy: 93–0; Higgins v Doherty: 68–30; Hendry v Murphy: 74–25; McManus v Doherty: 59–63; Higgins v O'Brien: 21–70; Hendry v Doherty: 69–70; McManus v O'Brien: 71–24; Higgins v Murphy: 59–70; Hendry v O'Brien: 77–46; McManus v Murphy: 66–60; Higgins v Doherty: 63–20; McManus v O'Brien: 8–75; Higgins v Murphy: 44–66; Hendry v Doherty: 0–102 (68); Higgins v O'Brien: 86–26; Hendry v Murphy: 73–34
	Highest break	
	Century breaks	
	50+ breaks	
