= Eugene Hughes (snooker player) =

Irish snooker player

Personal information
- Born: 4 November 1955 (age 70) Dún Laoghaire, Ireland

Sport
- Country: Ireland
- Sport: Snooker
- Professional: 1981–1997
- Highest ranking: 20 (1986/1987)
- Best ranking finish: Semi-final (x2)

Eugene Hughes (born 4 November 1955 in Dún Laoghaire) is an Irish former professional snooker player. In 1985, 1986 and 1987 he was a member of the successful all-Irish team in the World Cup, alongside Alex Higgins and Dennis Taylor.

== Career ==
Hughes was born on 4 November 1955 in Dún Laoghaire. He won the national under-19 English billiards and snooker titles in 1975, and later won the senior national titles four times in each discipline. He recorded a new championship record break at the 1980 World Amateur Snooker Championship. He turned professional in 1981.

He reached his highest professional world ranking of 20 in the Snooker world rankings 1986/1987. In 1985, 1986 and 1987 he was a member of the successful all-Irish team in the World Cup, alongside Alex Higgins and Dennis Taylor. He reached two ranking semi-finals: the 1984 International Open and the 1986 International Open. He qualified for the World Championship five times, including three successive years from 1985 to 1987, reaching the second round in 1986, beating David Taylor at the Crucible and losing to reigning champion Joe Johnson 9–10 in 1987. He reached (and lost) six Irish Professional Championship semi-finals between 1982 and 1989.

Hughes ended the 1996–97 snooker season ranked 169th, which meant he lost his status as a professional, as only the top 64 players qualified. He remained active in billiards, winning the Irish title for the eighth time in 2009.

== Personal life ==
After himself relocating to England, Hughes allowed his compatriot and fellow-snooker player Stephen Murphy live in his house when Murphy first moved to England to pursue his snooker career. The pair practised together at Ilford Snooker Club. A football fan, he is a supporter of Manchester United.

== Career finals ==
=== Team finals: 3 (3 titles) ===
Career team final details are shown below.

Outcome	No.	Year	Championship	Team/partner	Opponent(s) in the final	Score
Winner	1.	1985	World Cup	Ireland	England	9–7
Winner	2.	1986	World Cup (2)	Ireland	Canada	9–7
Winner	3.	1987	World Cup (3)	Ireland	Canada	9–2
