= 1985 Kit Kat Break for World Champions =

Professional invitational snooker tournament

Kit Kat Break for World Champions
Tournament information
- Dates: 17–20 December 1985
- Venue: East Midlands Conference Centre
- City: Nottingham
- Country: England
- Organisation: WPBSA
- Format: Non-Ranking event
- Total prize fund: £30,000
- Winner's share: £10,000
- Highest break: 126 (Dennis Taylor)

Final
- Champion: (Northern Ireland) Dennis Taylor
- Runner-up: (England) Steve Davis
- Score: 9–5

The 1985 Kit Kat Break for World Champions was a professional invitational snooker tournament which took place from 17 to 20 December 1985. Dennis Taylor won the event by defeating Steve Davis 9–5 in the final.

The tournament was played at the East Midlands Conference Centre in Nottingham, with all eight of the actively playing winners of the World Snooker Championship as the participants.

Steve Davis and Dennis Taylor met in a final for the third time this season. Davis' 10–9 victory in the 1985 Grand Prix had been followed by Taylor's 9–5 win in the 1985 Canadian Masters. Davis achieved a 4–3 lead by the end of the first session of the Kit Kat Break for World Champions final, but Taylor won six of the next seven frames to take the match 9–5.

The event had a prize fund of £30,000, with £10,000 awarded to the winner. Taylor compiled the highest break of the event, 126.

== Main draw ==
Names in bold denote match winners.

Quarter-finals; Best of 9 frames
(Northern Ireland) **Dennis Taylor**	**5**
(England) Fred Davis	0
(Wales) **Terry Griffiths**	**5**
(Wales) Ray Reardon	2
(England) **Steve Davis**	**5**
(England) John Spencer	2
(Canada) Cliff Thorburn	4
(Northern Ireland) **Alex Higgins**	**5**

Semi-finals; Best of 11 frames
(Northern Ireland) **Dennis Taylor**	**6**
(Wales) Terry Griffiths	4
(England) **Steve Davis**	**6**
(Northern Ireland) Alex Higgins	1

Final; Best of 17 frames
(Northern Ireland) **Dennis Taylor**	**9**
(England) Steve Davis	5

== Century breaks ==
126 (Northern Ireland) Dennis Taylor
118 (Wales) Terry Griffiths
