= 1985 World Snooker Championship =

Professional snooker tournament

1985 Embassy World Snooker Championship
- The programme for the event featuring defending champion Steve Davis

Tournament information
- Dates: 12–28 April 1985
- Venue: Crucible Theatre
- City: Sheffield
- Country: England
- Organisation: WPBSA
- Format: Ranking event
- Total prize fund: £250,000
- Winner's share: £60,000
- Highest break: Bill Werbeniuk (CAN) (143)

Final
- Champion: Dennis Taylor (NIR)
- Runner-up: Steve Davis (ENG)
- Score: 18–17

The 1985 World Snooker Championship (also known as the 1985 Embassy World Snooker Championship for the purpose of sponsorship) was a professional ranking tournament in snooker that took place from 12 to 28 April 1985 at the Crucible Theatre in Sheffield, England. Organised by the World Professional Billiards and Snooker Association (WPBSA), the event was the ninth consecutive World Snooker Championship to be held at the Crucible, the first tournament having taken place in 1977. A five-round qualifying event for the championship was held at the Preston Guild Hall from 29 March to 5 April for 87 players, 16 of whom reached the main stage, where they met the 16 invited seeded players. The tournament was broadcast in the United Kingdom by the BBC, and was sponsored by the Embassy cigarette company. The total prize fund for the event was £250,000, the highest prize pool for any snooker tournament to that date. The winner received £60,000, which was the highest amount ever received by the winner of a snooker event at that time.

The defending champion was Englishman Steve Davis, who had previously won the World Championship three times. He met Northern Irishman Dennis Taylor in the final which was a best-of-35-frames match. Davis took an early 9–1 lead, but Taylor battled back into the match and drew level at 17–17, forcing a deciding frame. The 35th frame was contested over the final black ball, with the player able to pot the ball winning the world title. After Taylor missed three attempts to pot the black, Davis missed his only attempt to leave Taylor a relatively simple pot to win his sole World Championship. The match, often referred to as the "black ball final", is commonly considered to be the best-known match in the history of snooker and a reason for the surge in the sport's popularity in the 1980s and 1990s.

Canadian Bill Werbeniuk scored the championship's highest break, a 143, in his first-round match. There were 14 century breaks compiled during the championship, with ten more in qualifying matches. This was the first professional snooker championship to introduce a ban on performance-enhancing substances, with all players in the main stage having to undertake drug tests. The final between Davis and Taylor holds the record for the most-viewed broadcast in the United Kingdom of a programme shown after midnight, with a peak of 18.5 million viewers for the match's final frame, breaking the existing records for the most-viewed sporting event and BBC2 programme.

== Overview ==
The World Snooker Championship is a professional tournament and the official world championship of the game of snooker. Developed in the late 19th century by British Army soldiers stationed in India, snooker was popular in the United Kingdom before being introduced to Europe and the Commonwealth. The sport is now played worldwide, especially in East and Southeast Asian nations such as China, Hong Kong and Thailand.

The World Championship is organised by the World Professional Billiards and Snooker Association (WPBSA). It features 32 professional players competing in one-on-one single-elimination matches, played over several frames. The players are selected to take part using a combination of the world snooker rankings and a pre-tournament qualification round. The first World Championship, in 1927, was won by Joe Davis in a final at Camkin's Hall in Birmingham, England. Since 1977, the tournament has been held at the Crucible Theatre in Sheffield. The 1984 championship was won by England's Steve Davis, who defeated fellow countryman Jimmy White 18–16 in the final; this was Davis's third world championship win, following his victories in 1981 and 1983. The winner of the 1985 championship received a prize of £60,000 from a total of £250,000, the highest first prize amount for a snooker event to that date.

The tournament was the first snooker event to feature drug tests for the participants, as mandated by the WPBSA on 9 April 1985; the tests were proposed by WPBSA board member Barry Hearn. The event was broadcast by the BBC in the United Kingdom, with over 90 hours of coverage. The estimated cost for the fortnight's broadcast was reportedly £3 million. The championship was sponsored by the Embassy cigarette company.

=== Format ===
The championship was held from 12 to 28 April 1985 at the Crucible Theatre in Sheffield, England, the ninth consecutive World Championship to be held at the venue. It was the last ranking event of the 1984–85 snooker season. There were 103 entrants from the World Snooker Tour, with 32 participants in the competition's main draw. A five-round knockout qualifying competition with 87 players, held at Preston Guild Hall between 29 March and 5 April, produced the 16 qualifying players who progressed into the main draw to play the top 16 seeds. The draw for the tournament was made at the Savoy Hotel in London on 16 January 1985.

The top 16 players in the latest world rankings automatically qualified for the main draw as seeded players. (Note: If the defending champion was ranked outside the top 16 in the world rankings, they would also be an automatic qualifier, in place of the player ranked 16th.) As defending champion, Steve Davis was seeded first for the event; the remaining 15 seeds were allocated based on world rankings for the 1984–85 season. Matches in the first round of the main draw were played as best-of-19-frames. The number of frames needed to win a match increased to 13 in the second round and quarter-finals, and 16 in the semi-finals; the final match was played as best-of-35-frames.

Six former world champions participated in the main tournament at the Crucible: Ray Reardon (1970, 1973, 1974, 1975, 1976, and 1978), Steve Davis (1981, 1983, and 1984), John Spencer (1969, 1971, and 1977), Alex Higgins (1972 and 1982), Cliff Thorburn (1980) and Terry Griffiths (1979). Four players made their world championship debuts, all via the qualifying event: Dene O'Kane, Eugene Hughes, Tony Jones, and Wayne Jones.

=== Prize fund ===
The event had a total prize fund of £250,000, an increase of £50,000 in the total prize pool from the previous year, and the winner received £60,000, an increase of £16,000 from the previous year. The prize amount was a new record high for snooker event. The breakdown of prize money for the tournament was:

- Winner: £60,000
- Runner-up: £35,000
- Semi-finals: £20,000
- Quarter-finals: £10,000
- Last 16: £5,250
- Last 32: £2,500
- Qualifying groups runner-up: £1,500
- Qualifying groups third place: £750
- Highest break: £6,000
- Maximum break: £60,000

== Tournament summary ==
=== Qualifying ===
The qualifying rounds for the event were played from 29 March to 5 April at the Preston Guildhall. The qualifying competition consisted of five knockout rounds, starting with 87 players. There were seven matches in the first round, bringing the number of remaining players to 80. The other four qualifying rounds each contained 16 matches, the winners of each round meeting the 16 higher-ranked players who had been seeded into the next round. The 16 winners from the fifth and final qualifying round met the top 16 seeds in the first round of the main competition.

All qualifying matches were played as best-of-19-frames. John Dunning was seeded into the third round of qualifying, where he played his first return match since his heart attack at the 1984 Grand Prix; he lost the match to Wayne Jones, 6–10. Danny Fowler made the highest break of the qualifying competition, scoring a 137 in his 10–0 victory over Jim Donnelly in the fourth round, before losing 2–10 to John Parrott in the fifth. Fred Davis, aged 71 and eight-time champion between 1948 and 1956, defeated Robert Chaperon 10–9 in the fourth round of qualifying but lost 6–10 to Rex Williams in the fifth.

=== First round ===
The first round of the championship, from 12 to 17 April, featured 32 players competing in 16 best-of-19-frames matches in two sessions; each seeded player competed against a qualifier. The first match to finish was between second seed Tony Knowles and qualifier Tony Jones. Knowles won four straight frames before he was pegged back to 4–4. Jones took four of the next five frames to lead 8–5 but eventually lost 8–10. As part of an initiative to remove performance-enhancing substances, drug tests were performed for the first time during the event; Knowles was the first player tested.

A series of articles in the Daily Star about drug abuse in the championship was based on statements reportedly by Silvino Francisco. Francisco trailed 1–8 after the first session of his first-round match against 11th seed Dennis Taylor, and lost the match 2–10. At a press conference held afterwards, World Snooker chairman Rex Williams said that there was no evidence of drug use in the sport, and Francisco apologised to Kirk Stevens (the player named in the Daily Star articles), claiming that the statements in the article were a "total lie".

Top seed and defending champion, Steve Davis, won his match against Neal Foulds 10–8 to reach the second round. Only two unseeded players won their first-round matches: Patsy Fagan defeated 12th seed Willie Thorne 10–6 and John Parrott defeated 13th seed John Spencer 10–3. Spencer was diagnosed with myasthenia gravis shortly after the tournament; his vision was affected and he won only two matches all season. After being defeated twice during the season by Eugene Hughes, six-time champion and fifth seed Ray Reardon won 10–9 against Hughes on a deciding frame.

In a low-scoring match between ninth seed Alex Higgins and Dean Reynolds, neither player produced a break of over 30 points in the first three frames. Reynolds won just the fifth frame of the opening session, Higgins taking an 8–1 lead and eventually winning 10–4. John Virgo led tenth seed Tony Meo 5–4 after the first session, but won just one frame in the second session to lose 6–10. In a press conference after the match, Virgo said: "I don't think Tony played well enough to beat me. It was the run of the balls that beat me. That's the way it has been for me for six years. I can't explain it. I practise hard. I play well, but sometimes that is not enough. You need a lot of luck in this game and I didn't get any at all."

Although fourth seed Kirk Stevens defeated Ray Edmonds 10–8, snooker pundit Clive Everton said that his standard of play was not that of a top-four player and Edmonds "made [Stevens] work". In a slow first session, Rex Williams and eighth seed Terry Griffiths played seven (instead of the planned nine) frames; Griffiths led 6–1 after three hours and 38 minutes, eventually winning the match 10–3. Bill Werbeniuk (seeded 14th), who had not won a match all season, defeated Joe Johnson 10–8 and scored a 143 break in the tenth frame – the third-highest break at the championship at that time.

Third seed Cliff Thorburn defeated Mike Hallett, 10–8; 15th seed Doug Mountjoy defeated Murdo MacLeod, 10–5; 16th seed David Taylor defeated Dene O'Kane, 10–4; and sixth seed Eddie Charlton defeated John Campbell, 10–3, in an all-Australian tie.

=== Second round ===
The second round, from 18 to 22 April, was played as eight best-of-25-frames matches. Steve Davis led David Taylor 3–0 and 6–3 before winning seven of the eight frames in the second session to win 13–4, scoring century breaks in the eighth (100) and eleventh (105) frames. Alex Higgins and Terry Griffiths were tied 5–5 after ten frames. Griffiths pulled ahead during the second session, leading 10–6, and won three of the first four frames of the final session to win 13–7. John Parrott led Kirk Stevens 6–2 after the first session and eventually won, 13–6.

Ray Reardon and Patsy Fagan were tied after the first session, 4–4, before Reardon pulled ahead 7–5. Reardon fluked the final black ball of frame 13 to lead 8–5, and pulled ahead 12–9 before his cue tip came off in frame 22 when he was well ahead on points. Reardon would have been allowed 15 minutes to replace his cue tip, but Fagan offered to let Reardon use his cue. Reardon accepted, using Fagan's borrowed cue to complete his victory. In an all-Canadian second-round match, Cliff Thorburn defeated Bill Werbeniuk 13–3 with a session to spare. Two former event finalists, Dennis Taylor and Eddie Charlton, met in the second round; Taylor defeated Charlton, 13–6. Seventh seed Jimmy White overcame Tony Meo, after being tied 10–10, to win 13–11. In the final second-round match, Tony Knowles defeated Doug Mountjoy 13–6.

=== Quarter-finals ===
The quarter-finals were played as best-of-25-frames matches in three sessions on 23 and 24 April. Terry Griffiths led Steve Davis after winning the first four frames of the match, but finished the first session at 4–4. Davis won six of the eight frames in the second session to lead 10–6. In the first frame of the third session, Griffiths committed a foul by touching a ball with his waistcoat, following which Davis made a break of 80 to win the frame. Davis also took the next two frames, winning 13–6 to reach his fourth World Championship semi-final. John Parrott also won the first four frames of his match against Ray Reardon, and led 5–3 after the first session. Parrott extended his lead to 9–5 in the second session, but missed the green ball in two successive frames to lead by only 9–7 after the session. Reardon won the first five frames of the third session (seven in a row) to lead 12–9, and Parrott won the next three frames to force a deciding frame. With one red left on the table, Parrott led by seven points; Reardon snookered Parrott, and won a free ball to win the match with a break of 31.

Due to slow play, only six of the eight frames of the opening session between Dennis Taylor and Cliff Thorburn were played. Taylor took a lead of 4–0, before ending the session at 4–2. The session was described as interesting by Clive Everton of The Guardian, however, due to the "high quality of the tactical play." The second session was also long-winded, with the match adjourned at 1:21 a.m. (after nine hours and 45 minutes of play); Taylor led 10–5, with a frame still to be played. Resuming the match, Taylor won three straight frames to win 13–5 and reach his fifth semi-final. Thorburn said after the match that both players were at fault for the slow play: "I wasn't the only one playing safe. If I had played well, this would have been the longest match ever." There was only one break of over 50 in the entire match, made by Taylor in the final frame.

Second seed Tony Knowles played Jimmy White, and led 5–3 after the first session. Knowles made a break of 137 during the session, but missed the black; it would have been the tournament's highest break. He retained his lead through the second session, despite twice being a pot away from being tied; the session finished 9–7. Returning to the match, Knowles won the next two frames but White won a re-spotted black in frame 19. Knowles handled the pressure better than White, and won 13–10.

=== Semi-finals ===
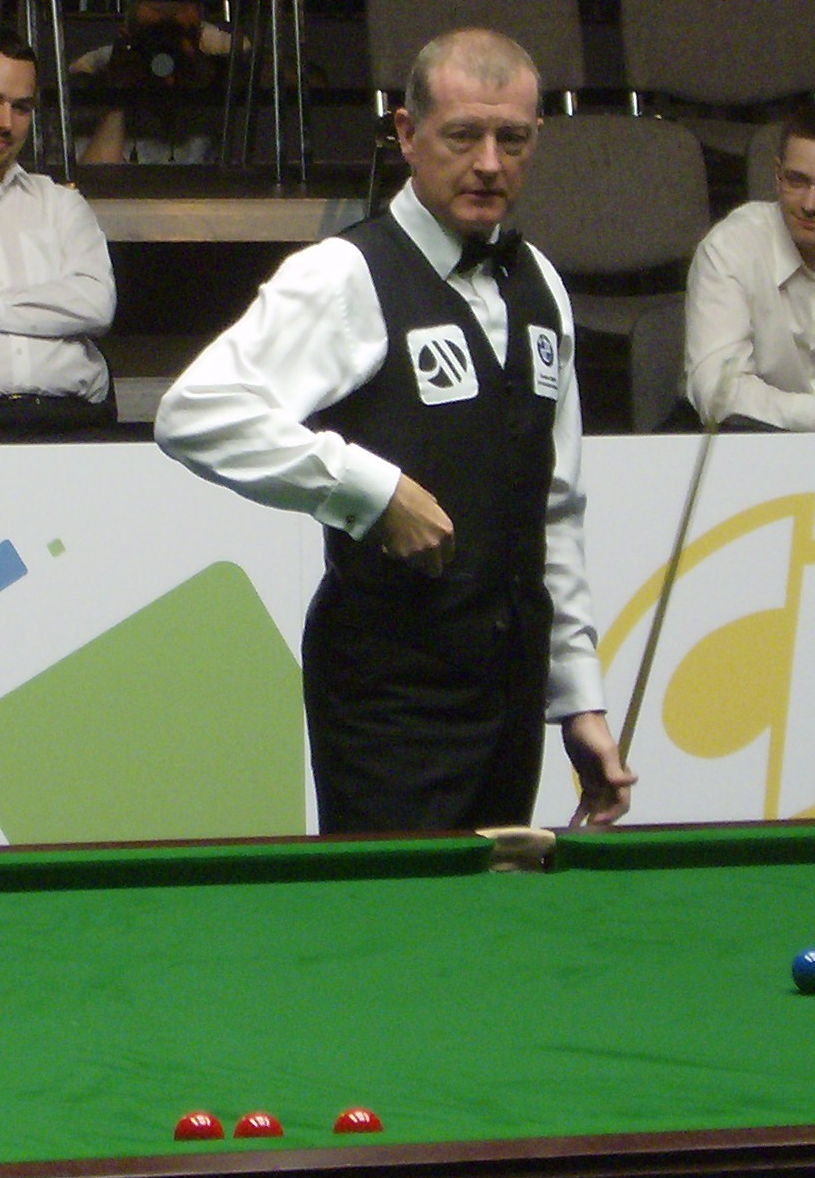
Defending champion Steve Davis (pictured in 2007) reached the final by defeating Ray Reardon in the semi-finals, completing the 100th Crucible century break.

The semi-finals were played on 25 and 26 April as best-of-31-frames matches over four sessions. Reigning champion Steve Davis defeated Ray Reardon, needing only three sessions to secure a 16–5 victory. Reardon failed to play at the level he had played against Parrott. Although Reardon had won his previous matches with strong safety play, Davis's long potting created opportunities throughout the match. Janice Hale of Snooker Scene magazine wrote that the match had "an air of inevitability", with Davis in full control. Davis compiled the 100th century break made at the Crucible, a 106 break in frame 13. In winning, he reached his third straight World Championship final.

Tony Knowles played Dennis Taylor in the second semi-final. After winning the first two frames, Knowles won only three more frames in the rest of the match; Taylor led 10–5 after the second session, and then took six frames in a row to win the match in three sessions. Knowles had expected to win, as the higher-seeded player, but he failed to exhibit the form he had shown earlier in the tournament and fell by the same scoreline as Reardon. Afterwards, he could not understand how he had lost to a lower-seeded player. Taylor said that he had seen Knowles get "angry" during the match, however, and that he had "thrown his cue" at a few shots. Knowles also lost the following year's event in the semi-finals to eventual champion Joe Johnson.

Because both semi-finals were one-sided and finished early, tournament organisers arranged exhibition matches to occupy the pre-sold afternoon and evening sessions on 26 April.

=== Final ===
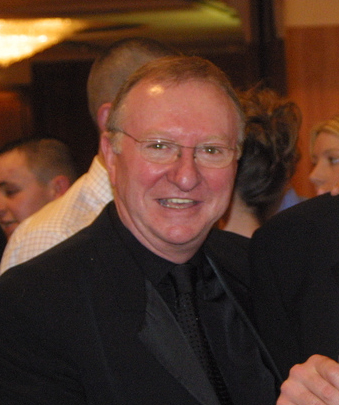
Dennis Taylor (pictured in 2004) won the championship by potting the final black ball to claim his sole world title.

The final was played between Steve Davis and Dennis Taylor on 27 and 28 April as a best-of-35-frames match over four sessions. This was Davis's fourth world final, having won the title in 1981, 1983, and 1984; and Taylor's second, having lost 16–24 to Terry Griffiths in the 1979 final. Davis and Taylor had met at the World Championship on two previous occasions, Taylor winning their first-round encounter in 1979 and Davis winning the semi-final in 1984.

Although Taylor scored a break of 50 in the first frame of the match, Davis won all seven frames of the opening session to lead 7–0. At the start of the second session, Davis took the eighth frame and was leading in frame nine but missed a thin cut on the green ball. This error was later considered the turning point of the match, as it allowed Taylor to win his first frame, Davis however won the next frame to lead 9–1, but Taylor won six frames in a row to finish the second session 7–9 behind overnight. On the second day, Taylor tied the match at 11–11 and 15–15, but was never ahead at any point. Davis won the next two frames to lead 17–15, needing one more frame to win the championship. Taylor clinched frame 33 and then made a break of over 50 to tie the match at 17–17, forcing a deciding frame.

The final frame lasted more than an hour, finishing after midnight British Summer Time. Davis led 62–44, with just the last four balls to play, Taylor requiring all four to win the match. He potted difficult shots on the brown, blue, and pink, leaving the black ball to determine the winner of the championship. With the black safe, both players attempted to double the ball. The first real opportunity fell to Taylor, with a long pot to the baulk corner, but he missed the shot; according to commentator Jim Meadowcroft, "That was the biggest shot of his life". Davis was left with a thin cut on the black; he stepped up to the table and again missed the shot, leaving Taylor a mid-range shot. Ted Lowe said, "This is really unbelievable" before Taylor potted the black and won the match. Taylor was not ahead at any point during the match, until the final pot. The final between Davis and Taylor attracted an average of 14.4 million viewers with a peak of 18.5 million viewers on BBC2, the programme finishing at 12:23 a.m. after Taylor had won the title. The viewership was the highest for any broadcast after midnight in the United Kingdom, and the most-viewed show on BBC2. The match became known as "the black ball final".

After potting the final ball, Taylor raised his cue stick; he "waggled" his finger and kissed the winner's trophy. He said in a 2009 interview that the gesture was aimed at his "good mate" Trevor East, whom he had told he would win. (Mark Selby would mimic his gimmick in 2014 after defeating Ronnie O'Sullivan, who also was the defending champion of the last 2 world championships.) At a press conference afterwards, he said that the match was the "best he had ever been involved in [his] life". Taylor dedicated the world championship to his late mother who had died the previous year. Unwilling to play snooker, he had withdrawn from the 1984 International Open. His family and friends had persuaded him to play again in the Grand Prix event, where he won his first professional title by defeating Cliff Thorburn in the final.

== Main draw ==
The results for each round of the main stage of the championship are shown below. The numbers in parentheses beside some of the players are their seeding ranks (each championship has 16 seeds and 16 qualifiers).

First round Best of 19 frames
12 April
Steve Davis (ENG) (1)	10
Neal Foulds (ENG)	8
12 & 13 April
David Taylor (ENG) (16)	10
Dene O'Kane (NZL)	4
13 & 14 April
Alex Higgins (NIR) (9)	10
Dean Reynolds (ENG)	4
13 & 14 April
Terry Griffiths (WAL) (8)	10
Rex Williams (ENG)	3
14 & 15 April
Ray Reardon (WAL) (5)	10
Eugene Hughes (IRL)	9
15 & 16 April
Willie Thorne (ENG) (12)	6
Patsy Fagan (IRL)	10
15 & 16 April
John Spencer (ENG) (13)	3
John Parrott (ENG)	10
16 & 17 April
Kirk Stevens (CAN) (4)	10
Ray Edmonds (ENG)	8
16 & 17 April
Cliff Thorburn (CAN) (3)	10
Mike Hallett (ENG)	8
16 April
Bill Werbeniuk (CAN) (14)	10
Joe Johnson (ENG)	8
15 April
Dennis Taylor (NIR) (11)	10
Silvino Francisco (RSA)	2
14 & 15 April
Eddie Charlton (AUS) (6)	10
John Campbell (AUS)	3
13 & 14 April
Jimmy White (ENG) (7)	10
Wayne Jones (WAL)	4
13 & 14 April
Tony Meo (ENG) (10)	10
John Virgo (ENG)	6
12 & 13 April
Doug Mountjoy (WAL) (15)	10
Murdo MacLeod (SCO)	5
12 April
Tony Knowles (ENG) (2)	10
Tony Jones (ENG)	8

Second round Best of 25 frames
17 & 18 April
(England) Steve Davis (1)	13
(England) David Taylor (16)	4
18 & 19 April
(Northern Ireland) Alex Higgins (9)	7
(Wales) Terry Griffiths (8)	13
19 & 20 April
(Wales) Ray Reardon (5)	13
(Republic of Ireland) Patsy Fagan	9
20 & 21 April
(England) John Parrott	13
(Canada) Kirk Stevens (4)	6
20 & 21 April
(Canada) Cliff Thorburn (3)	13
(Canada) Bill Werbeniuk (14)	3
19 & 20 April
(Northern Ireland) Dennis Taylor (11)	13
(Australia) Eddie Charlton (6)	6
18 & 19 April
(England) Jimmy White (7)	13
(England) Tony Meo (10)	11
17, 18 & 19 April
(Wales) Doug Mountjoy (15)	6
(England) Tony Knowles (2)	13

Quarter-finals; Best of 25 frames
22 & 23 April
(England) Steve Davis (1)	13
(Wales) Terry Griffiths (8)	6
22 & 23 April
(Wales) Ray Reardon (5)	13
(England) John Parrott	12
22 & 23 April
(Canada) Cliff Thorburn (3)	5
(Northern Ireland) Dennis Taylor (11)	13
22 & 23 April
(England) Jimmy White (7)	10
(England) Tony Knowles (2)	13

Semi-finals; Best of 31 frames
24 & 25 April
(England) Steve Davis (1)	16
(Wales) Ray Reardon (5)	5
24, 25 & 26 April
(Northern Ireland) Dennis Taylor (11)	16
(England) Tony Knowles (2)	5

Final; Best of 35 frames
27 & 28 April
(England) Steve Davis (1)	17
(Northern Ireland) Dennis Taylor (11)	18

Final: (Best of 35 frames) Crucible Theatre, Sheffield, 27 & 28 April. Referee: John Williams
Steve Davis (1); England				17–18				Dennis Taylor (11); Northern Ireland			
Players	Session 1: 7–0										
Frame	1	2	3	4	5	6	7	8	9	10	11
Davis	88^{†}	93^{†} (87)	49^{†}	65^{†}	95^{†} (55)	85^{†} (66)	83^{†} (58)	N/A	N/A	N/A	N/A
Taylor	50 (50)	0	2	38	1	6	20	N/A	N/A	N/A	N/A
Players	Session 2: 2–7 (9–7)										
Frame	1	2	3	4	5	6	7	8	9	10	11
Davis	121^{†} (64, 57)	49	76^{†} (57)	48	27	19	1	0	48	N/A	N/A
Taylor	0	59^{†}	27	63^{†}	75^{†} (61)	99^{†} (98)	71^{†} (70)	100^{†} (56)	77^{†}	N/A	N/A
Players	Session 3: 4–4 (13–11)										
Frame	1	2	3	4	5	6	7	8	9	10	11
Davis	25	72^{†}	66^{†}	45	2	1	64^{†}	58^{†}	N/A	N/A	N/A
Taylor	68^{†} (53)	43	58	80^{†}	73^{†} (57)	80^{†} (55)	56	46	N/A	N/A	N/A
Players	Session 4: 4–7 (17–18)										
Frame	1	2	3	4	5	6	7	8	9	10	11
Davis	86^{†} (86)	43	78^{†} (66)	29	4	29	66^{†}	81^{†}	47	24	62
Taylor	13	82^{†} (61)	17	84^{†} (70)	72^{†} (57)	83^{†} (79)	6	0	75^{†}	71^{†} (57)	66^{†}
87				Highest break				98			
0				Century breaks				0			
12				50+ breaks				10			
(Northern Ireland) Dennis Taylor wins the 1985 Embassy World Snooker Championship † = Winner of frame

== Qualifying ==
Five rounds of qualifying were played for the event from 29 March to 5 April at the Preston Guildhall.

Round 1

Player	Score	Player
Gino Rigitano (CAN)	10–9	Dessie Sheehan (IRL)
Dene O'Kane (NZL)	w.o.–w/d	Jack McLaughlin (NIR)
Steve Longworth (ENG)	10–1	James Giannaros (AUS)
Bob Chaperon (CAN)	10–7	Roger Bales (ENG)
Dennis Hughes (ENG)	10–5	Doug French (ENG)
Mike Hines (RSA)	10–8	Tony Chappel (WAL)
Danny Fowler (ENG)	10–0	John Hargreaves (ENG)

Round 2 Best of 19 frames
Bob Harris (ENG)	4
Gino Rigitano (CAN)	10
Vic Harris (ENG)	5
Dene O'Kane (NZL)	10
Graham Cripsey (ENG)	8
Steve Longworth (ENG)	10
Leon Heywood (AUS)	1
Bob Chaperon (CAN)	10
Steve Newbury (WAL)	10
Dennis Hughes (ENG)	9
Paul Watchorn (IRL)	4
Mike Hines (RSA)	10
Gerry Watson (CAN)	w/d
Danny Fowler (ENG)	w.o.
Robby Foldvari (AUS)	w.o.
Paul Thornley (CAN)	w/d
Dave Chalmers (ENG)	10
David Greaves (ENG)	3
Geoff Foulds (ENG)	10
Maurice Parkin (ENG)	6
Paul Medati (ENG)	10
Bernard Bennett (ENG)	4
Ian Anderson (AUS)	10
Tony Kearney (IRL)	8
Wayne Jones (WAL)	10
John Rea (SCO)	3
Malcolm Bradley (ENG)	10
Derek Mienie (RSA)	4
Peter Francisco (RSA)	10
Bert Demarco (SCO)	4
Tony Jones (ENG)	10
Mike Darrington (ENG)	2

Round 3 Best of 19 frames
Billy Kelly (IRL)	6
Gino Rigitano (CAN)	10
Frank Jonik (CAN)	5
Dene O'Kane (NZL)	10
Jimmy van Rensberg (RSA)	10
Steve Longworth (ENG)	7
Paddy Morgan (AUS)	3
Bob Chaperon (CAN)	10
Pascal Burke (IRL)	3
Steve Newbury (WAL)	10
Matt Gibson (SCO)	10
Mike Hines (RSA)	7
Joe Caggianello (CAN)	w/d
Danny Fowler (ENG)	w.o.
Bill Oliver (ENG)	3
Robby Foldvari (AUS)	10
Eddie McLauglin (SCO)	9
Dave Chalmers (ENG)	10
Clive Everton (WAL)	2
Geoff Foulds (ENG)	10
Ian Williamson (ENG)	8
Paul Medati (ENG)	10
Paddy Browne (IRL)	10
Ian Anderson (AUS)	5
John Dunning (ENG)	6
Wayne Jones (WAL)	10
Bernie Mikkelsen (CAN)	9
Malcolm Bradley (ENG)	10
Tommy Murphy (CAN)	4
Peter Francisco (RSA)	10
Steve Duggan (ENG)	8
Tony Jones (ENG)	10

Round 4 Best of 19 frames
Mick Fisher (ENG)	2
Gino Rigitano (CAN)	10
Les Dodd (ENG)	7
Dene O'Kane (NZL)	10
Marcel Gauvreau (CAN)	10
Jimmy van Rensberg (RSA)	9
Fred Davis (ENG)	10
Bob Chaperon (CAN)	9
George Scott (ENG)	2
Steve Newbury (WAL)	10
Patsy Fagan (IRL)	10
Matt Gibson (SCO)	8
Jim Donnelly (SCO)	0
Danny Fowler (ENG)	10
Ray Edmonds (ENG)	10
Robby Foldvari (AUS)	3
Ian Black (SCO)	4
Dave Chalmers (ENG)	10
Colin Roscoe (WAL)	7
Geoff Foulds (ENG)	10
Warren King (AUS)	9
Paul Medati (ENG)	10
Mario Morra (CAN)	10
Paddy Browne (IRL)	6
Mike Watterson (ENG)	5
Wayne Jones (WAL)	10
Jim Wych (CAN)	10
Malcolm Bradley (ENG)	7
Jim Meadowcroft (ENG)	5
Peter Francisco (RSA)	10
Jack Fitzmaurice (ENG)	4
Tony Jones (ENG)	10

Round 5 Best of 19 frames
Neal Foulds (ENG)	10
Gino Rigitano (CAN)	8
Dave Martin (ENG)	8
Dene O'Kane (NZL)	10
Dean Reynolds (ENG)	10
Marcel Gauvreau (CAN)	1
Rex Williams (ENG)	10
Fred Davis (ENG)	6
Eugene Hughes (IRL)	10
Steve Newbury (WAL)	6
Cliff Wilson (WAL)	9
Patsy Fagan (IRL)	10
John Parrott (ENG)	10
Danny Fowler (ENG)	2
Mark Wildman (ENG)	7
Ray Edmonds (ENG)	10
Mike Hallett (ENG)	10
Dave Chalmers (ENG)	1
Joe Johnson (ENG)	10
Geoff Foulds (ENG)	6
Silvino Francisco (RSA)	10
Paul Medati (ENG)	7
John Campbell (AUS)	10
Mario Morra (CAN)	9
Graham Miles (ENG)	8
Wayne Jones (WAL)	10
John Virgo (ENG)	10
Jim Wych (CAN)	4
Murdo MacLeod (SCO)	10
Peter Francisco (RSA)	7
Eddie Sinclair (SCO)	2
Tony Jones (ENG)	10

== Legacy ==
On his return to Northern Ireland, Taylor received a victory parade in a Land Rover across his home town of Coalisland in front of 10,000 people. He was loaned mayoral robes on the day of the parade, and was accompanied by his wife and three children. He later signed a five-year contract with promoter Barry Hearn as his manager. Media covering the tournament called Steve Davis a "bad loser" for his silence and one-word responses to questions from David Vine at a press conference after the event. The press conference was later used as the basis for a Spitting Image skit on Davis. Taylor's victory is the most-viewed sporting event in the United Kingdom to date, and remains the most-viewed BBC2 programme of all time.

The tournament final was recreated and redistributed by the BBC in various forms. Four months later, in August 1985, BBC Video released a highlights video of the 1985 final which was one of the biggest selling videos of 1985. At the 2010 World Snooker Championship, to celebrate the 25th anniversary, Taylor and Davis replayed the final frame with commentary by John Virgo. The frame was played as an exhibition, with both players attempting to re-create the shots on the final black ball. The 1985 championship was examined in the BBC documentary, When Snooker Ruled the World, with particular emphasis on the final. Another one-hour BBC documentary on the final, Davis v Taylor: The '85 Black Ball Final, which featured interviews with Taylor's friends and family in Northern Ireland, was presented by Colin Murray.

During the 2015 World Snooker Championship, Davis presented Celebrity Black Ball Final on the BBC in which celebrities played the final two shots of the match; guests included Rebecca Adlington, Joey Essex, Russell Watson, Richard Osman and Josh Widdicombe. A 2017 BBC poll found the final to be the Crucible's "most memorable" moment, with the match receiving more than half the votes. Ronnie O'Sullivan's 1997 maximum break finished second. Davis also lost the following year's final, this time to Joe Johnson, but won another three world titles, in 1987, 1988 and 1989. Taylor never reached the final again, falling to the "Crucible curse" at the 1986 championship with a first-round loss to Mike Hallett.

Taylor's distinctive glasses worn during the tournament were designed specifically for him by Jack Karnehm. Many commentators commented that they looked like upside-down ladies' glasses, however after Taylor's win the style exploded in popularity amongst snooker players. Due to the tournament's popularity the glasses have been called 'one of the most distinctive pieces of eyewear in sporting history.'

== Century breaks ==
There were 14 century breaks in the championship. Bill Werbeniuk's 143 against Joe Johnson in the first round was the joint third-highest break in the championship's history, tied with Willie Thorne's in 1982. Only Cliff Thorburn's maximum break in 1983 and Doug Mountjoy's 145 in 1981 were higher. Tony Knowles missed the black on a break of 137 that would have scored a 144 in his quarter-final with Jimmy White.

- 143 – Bill Werbeniuk
- 137, 117 – Tony Knowles
- 128, 117 – Dennis Taylor
- 123 – Tony Meo
- 114, 108 – Jimmy White
- 114 – John Parrott
- 106, 105, 100 – Steve Davis
- 103 – Cliff Thorburn
- 101 – Neal Foulds

There were ten century breaks in the qualifying stages; the highest was made by Danny Fowler in his 10–0 whitewash of Jim Donnelly in the fourth round of qualifying.

- 137 – Danny Fowler
- 134 – Steve Newbury
- 132 – Bernie Mikkelsen
- 119 – John Virgo
- 110, 101 – Bob Chaperon
- 109 – Neal Foulds
- 107 Dave Chalmers
- 104 – Tony Jones
- 100 – Steve Longworth
