= 1984 Grand Prix =

1984 Grand Prix may refer to:

- 1984 Grand Prix (snooker)
- 1984 Grand Prix (tennis)
