= 1985 Grand Prix =

1985 Grand Prix may refer to:

- 1985 Grand Prix (snooker)
- 1985 Grand Prix (tennis)
