= 1985 China Masters =

China Masters
Tournament information
- Dates: 9–10 September 1985
- Venue: White Swan Hotel
- City: Guangzhou
- Country: China
- Organisation: Matchroom Sport
- Format: Non-ranking event

Final
- Champion: (England) Steve Davis
- Runner-up: (Northern Ireland) Dennis Taylor
- Score: 2–1

The 1985 China Masters was a professional non-ranking snooker tournament held in September 1985 in Shanghai, China. It was the first professional snooker event to be held in China.

Four players in total competed. The 1985 World Snooker Championship finalists Dennis Taylor and Steve Davis won their semi-finals against two local Chinese players, Suen Luen Pak and Yan Jing Jing, before Davis beat Taylor 2–1 in the final, which was refereed by Len Ganley. The tournament was televised in China, with an estimated audience of between 300 and 450 million people.
