= Snooker glasses =

Type of eyewear for cue sports

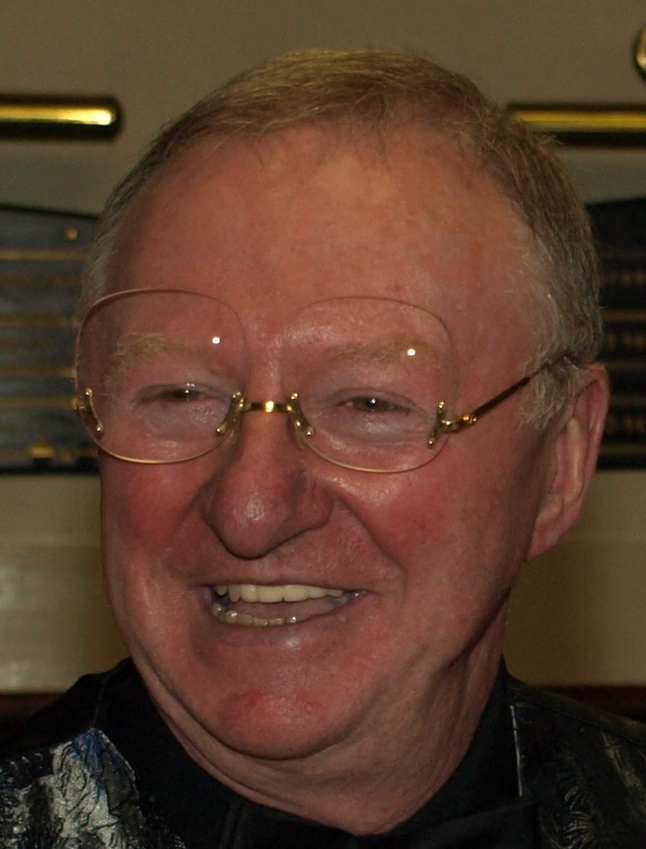
Snooker player Dennis Taylor wearing snooker glasses.

Snooker glasses, also called upside-down glasses, snooker spectacles, billiards glasses, or pool glasses are corrective glasses with a distinct visual style for use in cue sports such as snooker or billiards.

They were first made popular by snooker player Dennis Taylor in the 1985 Snooker World Championship, and due to Taylor's win in the final, which remains the most-viewed BBC2 programme of all time, they have been called "one of the most memorable pieces of eyewear in sporting history".

== History ==
The first snooker glasses were created by the English optician Theodore Hamblin and later pioneered by Fred Davis in 1938. However they did not take on their distinctive 'upside down' look until Jack Karnehm, a snooker and billiards player, and later commentator for the BBC, modified the existing snooker glasses design to help Dennis Taylor in the mid-1980s. According to Taylor, he had tried many different designs, including contact lenses, however none worked for him. He turned to Karnehm for help, as Karnehm had once been an apprentice optician, and he created glasses for Taylor which were made of real glass, and therefore quite heavy. Despite this, Taylor credited his win in the 1985 World Snooker Championship to the design that Karnehm had created.

Eventually the heavy 'upside-down' style glasses were refined into lighter, regular-shaped glasses with an extension at the top, however other styles exist such as ones with swivels on the arms to allow the player to adjust regular prescription glasses to whichever angle best suits them. Although most opticians have the capacity to create snooker glasses, due to the relative unfamiliarity of creating the glasses, many specialist opticians exist to provide this service, which often requires taking additional measurements than those that would be taken in a regular eye exam.

In 2016 Brulimar Optical Group and Taylor collaborated on a brand of snooker glasses which imitated the ones worn by Taylor in the 1985 World Championship, though considerably modernised. These glasses came with Taylor's signature on the temples, and in a case and with a microfibre cleaning cloth that were both in the same shade of green as on snooker tables.

== Functions ==
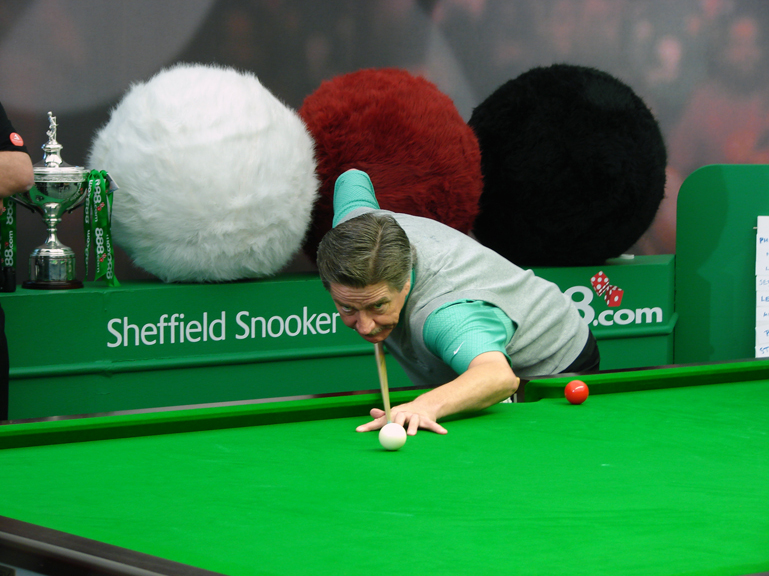
Cliff Thorburn at the 2007 World Snooker Championship lining up his shot, demonstrating the 30–45-degree angle players typically bend to.

Due to the typically deep angle of 30–45 degrees with which cue sport players need to bend to correctly hit their shot, a player wearing regular-sized corrective glasses will often end up looking over the top of their glasses, which makes it extremely difficult for the player to correctly line up their shot. Additionally, even with particularly large glasses to compensate for this, the view can end up distorted due to the angle the player is looking through them at not being the optical centre of the glasses. Snooker glasses have a pantoscopic tilt built into them to account for this, meaning the player is always looking through the optical centre of the glasses, no matter the angle of their head. Their semi-rimless prevents an awkward line from blocking the player's view, and snooker glasses also have a deeper lens than typical prescription glasses, resulting in a larger optical zone for the player.

Players can also be distracted by the glare of various lights around the playing area, and many snooker glasses come with anti-glare coatings as standard, although as anti-glare coatings have become more commonplace within the commercial glasses market, this feature is seen as less extraordinary.
