= 1987 Canadian Masters =

Canadian Masters
Tournament information
- Dates: 27–31 October 1987
- Venue: CBC Television Studios
- City: Toronto
- Country: Canada
- Organisation: WPBSA
- Format: Non-ranking event
- Total prize fund: £75,000
- Winner's share: £25,000
- Highest break: Dennis Taylor (NIR) (127)

Final
- Champion: (Northern Ireland) Dennis Taylor
- Runner-up: (England) Jimmy White
- Score: 9–7

The 1987 Labbatt's Canadian Masters was a professional non-ranking snooker tournament that took place between 27 and 31 October 1987 at the CBC Television Studios in Toronto, Canada.

Dennis Taylor won the tournament by defeating Jimmy White 9–7 in the final.

== Prize fund ==
The breakdown of prize money for this year is shown below:

- Winner: £25,000
- Runner-up: £12,000
- Semi-final: £9,000
- Quarter-final: £5,000
- Total: £75,000

== Main draw ==
Quarter-finals; Best of 9 Frames
(Northern Ireland) Dennis Taylor	5
(England) Steve Davis	1
(Canada) Cliff Thorburn	5
(England) Joe Johnson	3
(England) Jimmy White	5
(England) Tony Knowles	1
(England) Neal Foulds	5
(Wales) Terry Griffiths	4

Semi-finals; Best of 15 Frames
(Northern Ireland) Dennis Taylor	8
(Canada) Cliff Thorburn	5
(England) Jimmy White	8
(England) Neal Foulds	7

Final; Best of 17 Frames
(Northern Ireland) Dennis Taylor	9
(England) Jimmy White	7
