= Jack Karnehm =

British snooker commentator (1917–2002)

Personal information
- Born: 18 June 1917 Tufnell Park, London
- Died: 28 July 2002 (aged 85) Crowthorne, Berkshire

Sport
- Country: England
- Sport: Snooker
- Professional: 1973–1982
- Best ranking finish: Last 24 (x1)

Jack Richard Horace Karnehm (18 June 1917 – 28 July 2002) was a British snooker commentator, who was regularly heard on BBC television from 1978 until 1994, and a former amateur world champion at the game of English billiards. Karnehm was also a professional snooker and billiards player.

Besides his commentary, perhaps his major contribution to snooker was his development of swivel-lens glasses, later referred to as snooker glasses, which enabled Dennis Taylor to continue playing the game at a professional level. These were spectacles which were set at a compensatory angle, so the player could look along the shot through the optical centre of the lens. The originals had been designed by Theodore Hamblin, and pioneered by Fred Davis in 1938. Karnehm, who had served a five-year spectacle-making apprenticeship, made many pairs in his family business, but his upside-down design was a considerable improvement, for it offered wider peripheral vision. Taylor went on to win the World Snooker Championship in 1985.

Despite being best known to snooker audiences, Karnehm's passion was billiards. As a non-professional player, he was a ten-time London Amateur Billiards Champion, and also won the English Amateur Billiards Championship in 1969. That October, he took the IBSF World Billiards Championship title.

Karnehm turned professional in 1970, and was a challenger for the world title in 1971 (losing to Leslie Driffield) and 1973 (losing to Rex Williams). In 1970 he was Chairman of the Billiards Association and Control Council (BA&CC) when the Council nominated Driffield as the challenger to reigning champion Williams for the world professional Billiards Championship. Williams declined to play Driffield within the five months' time limit that the BA&CC Council had set, which expired on 7 July 1970, and forfeited the title, which was then contested between Driffield and Karnehm in June 1971. On 1 October 1970, the Professional Billiard Players Association, which had been reestablished in 1968 by Williams and seven other players, disaffiliated from the BA&CC. It changed its name to the World Professional Billiards and Snooker Association on 12 December 1970, and declared itself the governing body for the professional game, recognising Williams as champion. Driffield and Karnehm were, at first, the only two professionals to recognise the BA&CC's authority over the game.

In 1980, Karnehm beat Williams to win the UK Billiards Championship, his only professional title.

Karnehm is perhaps best known for his one-liner when he was commentating on a World Snooker Championship match between Cliff Thorburn and Terry Griffiths at the Crucible Theatre in 1983. The match is famous because, during its course, Thorburn completed the first maximum break at the Crucible. As Thorburn lined up to pot the final black, Karnehm softly uttered the words: "Good luck, mate".

Karnehm was also a noted snooker coach and in 1985 released an instructional video, Understanding Modern Snooker. He died suddenly in 2002, aged 85, after an afternoon working on his garden during extremely hot weather.

== Tournament wins ==
=== English billiards ===
- 1969 IBSF World Billiards Championship
- 1980 UK Billiards Championship
