= Matchroom Professional Championship =

Tournament information
- Venue: Cliffs Pavilion
- Location: Southend-on-Sea
- Country: England
- Established: 1986
- Organisation(s): Matchroom Sport
- Format: Non-ranking event
- Final year: 1988
- Final champion: (England) Steve Davis

The Matchroom Professional Championship was a non-ranking snooker tournament staged between 1986 and 1988. All three editions were held at Cliffs Pavilion in Southend-on-Sea. In its final year the tournament was sponsored by LEP.

The tournament was organised by Barry Hearn who managed up to eight of the top professional players at the time. The prize money on offer for the winner each year was £50,000, with the first edition being won by Willie Thorne who defeated Steve Davis 10–9 in the final. Thorne reached the final the following season, but lost 10–3 to Dennis Taylor. The final event, held in 1988 was won by Davis, defeating Taylor 10–7.

== Winners ==
Year	Winner	Runner-up	Final score	Season
1986	(England) Willie Thorne	(England) Steve Davis	10–9	1986/87
1987	(Northern Ireland) Dennis Taylor	(England) Willie Thorne	10–3	1987/88
1988	(England) Steve Davis	(Northern Ireland) Dennis Taylor	10–7	1988/89
