= Cliffs Pavilion =

Theatre, concert and exhibition venue in Essex, England

Coordinates: 51.5352°N 0.6969°E

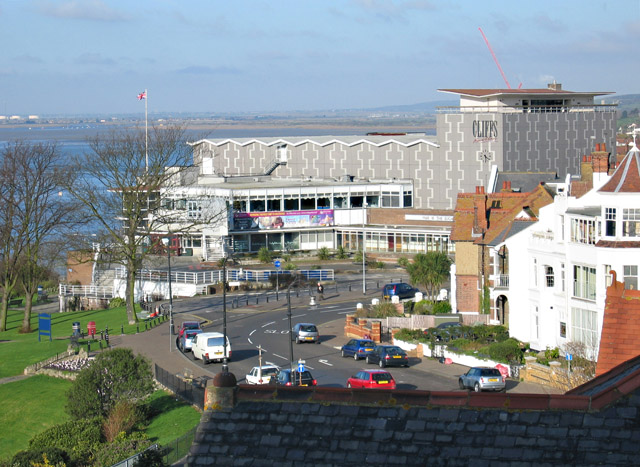
- Interactive map of Cliffs Pavilion
- Address: Station Rd; Southend-on-Sea, Essex SS0 7RA; England
- Location: Westcliff-on-Sea
- Owner: Southend-on-Sea City Council (operated by Trafalgar Entertainment)
- Capacity: 1,630

Construction
- Opened: 1964
- Renovated: 2010; 2024-2025
- Expanded: 1991-1992

Website
- Venue Website

Cliffs Pavilion (locally known as the Cliffs) is a theatre, sports, exhibition and concert venue located on Station Road in Westcliff-on-Sea, Essex, England, a suburb within the city of Southend-on-Sea. It is the largest purpose-built arts venue in Essex, and the largest capacity of any theatre in the East of England.

In 2006, the operation of Cliffs Pavilion, along with the Palace Theatre, were handed to HQ Theatres by Southend-on-Sea Borough Council. HQ Theatres merged with Trafalgar Entertainment in 2021. In February 2022, Cliffs Pavilion hosted a concert named He Built This City, a tribute to the murdered MP for Southend West Sir David Amess.

== The buildings history ==
=== Early history ===
Plans for a theatre, the Shorefield Pavilion, on the site started in 1935 when the borough council purchased the location to build a 500-seat theatre and concert venue, with work starting four years later on construction but was suspended by the outbreak of World War II. After the war, the site was known as Southend's white elephant, with the site laying empty due to budget constraints, until 1963, when work was started on a building that could host shows, concerts and private functions. The building was designed by the borough architect Patrick Burridge, who also designed Southend Civic Centre and Westcliff Library.

The 1,100 capacity theatre was opened by the actor, writer and director Sir Bernard Miles in July 1964, with the first show opening the next day starring Norman Vaughan and his troupe of dancers, the Swinging Lovelies. The hexagonal sunken forecourt that was at the front of the theatre (prior to the 2024/25 refurbishment) followed the line of the pre-war foundations. The theatre won a commendation at the Come to Britain awards held by the British Travel & Holiday Association in the same year. The Cliffs was the venue for the annual Southend-on-Sea Festival of Music and the Arts. In April 1974, extra seating that had been purchased for the summer season and stored in the underground car park under tarpaulin, caught fire, however the building was not damaged.

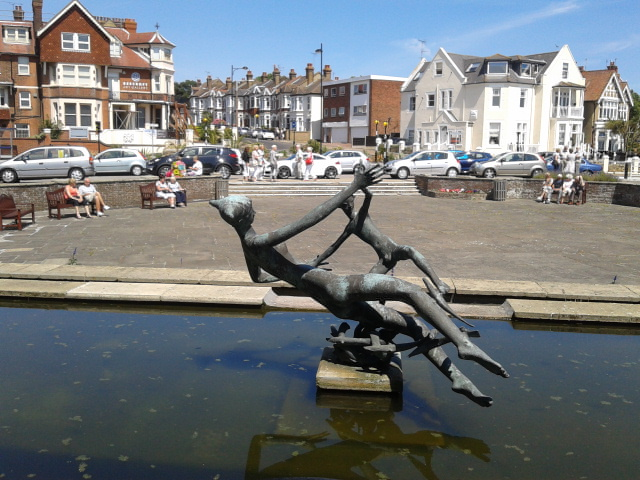
Statue and forecourt at the Cliffs Pavilion

=== 1990s redevelopment and 2000s refurbishment ===
From July 1991 to December 1992, the building was closed to be re-developed and enlarged, with funding from Southend Borough Council and was designed by Tim Foster Architects. The stairs were rebuilt, a new Foyer Bar added and a balcony added to the auditorium increasing the capacity to 1,630. The new extension was completed in an Art Deco style. The total cost for the redevelopment was £3.4 million. The theatre re-opened with the pantomime The Pied Piper of Hamelin starring Wayne Sleep, Peggy Mount and Richard Marner. The refurbished Cliffs Pavilion received a Civic Design Award in 1993.

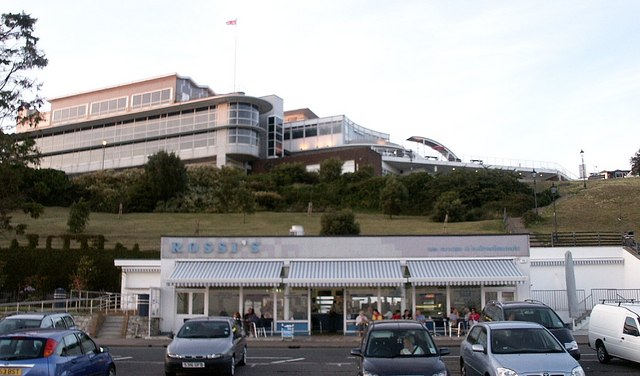
The Art Deco style 1991-92 extension

In 1998, the Arts Council allocated £850,000 of Lottery cash to Southend Borough Council to investigate a £20 million stage 2 redevelopment. The plans included building a new raked seating stall area, reducing the capacity to 1,601 seats, and a new stage house with dimensions for the stage and fly tower meeting the minimum requirements for major touring companies - an increase in the maximum height from 19 metres to 29 metres. The council brought in Levitt Bernstein Associates to oversee the design, however in 1999 the bid for £12 million of Lottery funding from the Arts Council was overlooked and stage 2 of the redevelopment was withdrawn.

In 2010, the Cliffs was closed for seven weeks while a refurbishment took place. The theatre's 1,630 seats that had been in the venue since the 1991-92 redevelopment were replaced, while the carpets in the Foyer were changed.

=== Pavilion refurbishment 2024–2026 ===
It was announced in November 2021 that the operator, Trafalgar Theatres and owner, Southend-on-Sea City Council had applied for planning permission for a major refurbishment of the Cliffs Pavilion costing £8 million, with £5.5 million provided by the UK government through the Levelling Up fund. The plan would see extensive improvements, with a major expansion of the restaurant, a new entrance and lobby to improve the customer experience, an upgraded ventilation system, a new outdoor piazza, bars, toilets, changing facilities and lifts. The redevelopment was due to begin in early 2024, with the building works to be completed by contractor Willmott Dixon, and were planned to take a year to complete. The Cliffs managers said the venue would remain open throughout the refurbishments. However, by February 2024, it was announced that there would be a delay to the start of the refurbishment works as the price had risen above the original cost. It was announced in August 2024 that work was due to start later that month, with Auburn Group awarded the contract after a recommissioning of the tender process. Work officially started on 22 August.

== Maritime Room ==
The Maritime Room is a smaller venue than the main theatre, and is located on the lower level. The venue was originally opened as a restaurant, but after a short trial negotiated by local musician Peter Morris, the venue was used for jazz music events, before expanding into country and western. From 1986 until 2014, the venue was home to the Joker Comedy Club, and it was at the club that local boy Lee Evans started his comedy career. The club hosted Frank Skinner, Stewart Lee and Bob Mills among others. Jazz remains a staple, with both the Jazz Mix and Open Mic club nights taking place at the venue. The venue is currently home to the Balls Out Comedy Club as well as Tropicana 80s nights.

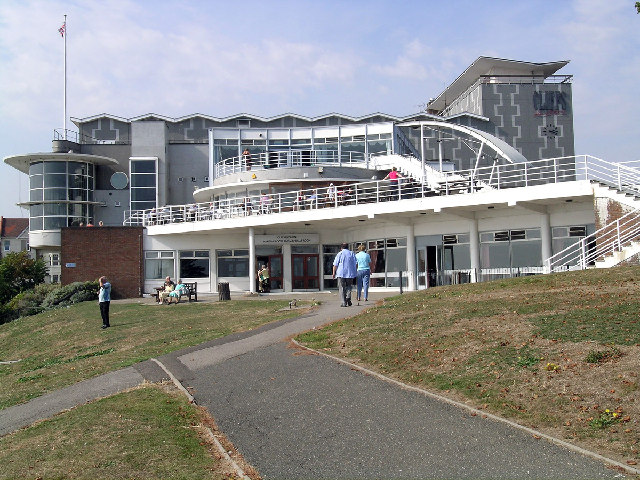
The Maritime Room from the exterior

== Performances at the Cliffs ==
The Cliffs has been the venue for a mixture of music, variety and theatrical shows, hosting some of the biggest names in entertainment since it opened in 1964. Here is a selection of notable performances:

- Jimi Hendrix appeared in February 1967 at the Grand Pop Festival, though the top of the bill was Dave Dee, Dozy, Beaky, Mick & Tich.
- On 19 July 1991, Paul McCartney performed one of his six "secret" shows at the Pavilion during his 1991 Unplugged Summer Tour.
- The Oasis concert film Live By The Sea was filmed at the Cliffs Pavilion during their performance on 17 April 1995. Tony McCarroll recalled in his book, Oasis. The Truth that "nobody had told him they were filming that night, but luckily they had a storming gig".
- In 2003, the last show of the Bottom Live 2003: Weapons Grade Y-Fronts Tour was performed and recorded for VHS and DVD at the Cliffs. It was the final time that Rik Mayall and Adrian Edmondson played their characters Richie and Eddie.
- The track "Beetlebum" from Blur's Live 2009 CD was recorded at the Cliff's Pavilion on 21 June 2009, a warmup gig to their reunion sets at Glastonbury Festival and Hyde Park, London (the CD was given away free with The Sunday Times).
- Micky Flanagan performed at the Cliffs in May 2011, which was recorded for his DVD The Out Out Tour. Flanagan opened the show saying, "The tour people, they asked me. They said, Mick, where do you want to go for the DVD. Do you want to go East? Do you want to go West? And I said I want to go to Essex! The only way is Essex!".
- After the closure for the COVID pandemic, Jimmy Carr filmed his Netflix special His Dark Material as the first show at the re-opened venue.

== Annual pantomime ==
The Cliffs hosts an annual pantomime with a big name celebrity cast, including Nick Berry and Melvyn Hayes in 1988, Timmy Mallett, John Virgo and Anne Nolan in 1993, and Melinda Messenger, Jonathon Morris, Patrick Mower and Little and Large in 1997. In 2018, Diversity were the celebrity performers for the production of Aladdin and won the Best speciality/double act at the 2019 Great British Pantomime Awards. Rylan Clark starred in the 2024 production of Jack and the Beanstalk, and was nominated for Best Newcomer at The Pantomime Awards 2025. Rylan returned in the 2025 panto Cinderella. Pantomimes since 1983 have included:

- 1983 Dick Whittington - Davy Jones, Bryan Marshall and Denise Nolan
- 1984 Snow White and the Seven Dwarfs - Ken Goodwin
- 1985 Aladdin - Johnny Ball, Leni Harper and Glynn Edwards
- 1986 The Pied Piper of Hamelin - Vince Hill, Melvyn Hayes and Jack Douglas
- 1987 Cinderella - Mike Reid, Helen Shapiro, Jeff Stevenson, Ann Beach and Alison Bettles
- 1988 Jack and the Beanstalk - Melvyn Hayes and Nick Berry
- 1989 Dick Whittington - Suzi Quatro, Ted Rogers, Alfred Marks and Linal Haft
- 1990 Snow White and the Seven Dwarfs - Keith Harris, Hugo Myatt, Denise Nolan and Cornelia Frances
- 1992 The Pied Piper of Hamelin - Wayne Sleep, Peggy Mount and Richard Marner
- 1993 Cinderella - Timmy Mallett, John Virgo, Richard Cadell and Anne Nolan
- 1994 Dick Whittington -Bobby Davro, Rod Hull, Bernadette Hunt, Garry Bushell and Ross Kemp
- 1995 Peter Pan - Joe Pasquale, Michaela Strachan and Leslie Grantham
- 1996 Snow White and the Seven Dwarfs - Linda Lusardi, Dave Benson Phillips, Geoff Capes, Kenny Baker, Malcolm Dixon and Nikki Kelly
- 1997 Aladdin - Little and Large, Jonathon Morris, Patrick Mower and Melinda Messenger
- 1998 Cinderella - Bobby Davro, Bob Carolgees, Bella Emberg, Sue Hodge, Kerry Ellis and Ray Meagher
- 1999 Jack and the Beanstalk - John Inman, Glen Murphy and Suzanne Cox
- 2000 Peter Pan - Shane Richie and Jeremy Spake
- 2001 Dick Whittington - Hale and Pace and Clive Rowe
- 2002 Goldilocks and the 3 Bears - Frank Bruno, Sooty and Sophie Lawrence
- 2003 Cinderella - Chuckle Brothers and Dr Evadne Hinge
- 2004 Peter Pan - Russ Abbot
- 2005 Snow White and the Seven Dwarfs - Linda Lusardi, Samuel Kane and Gary Beadle
- 2006 Dick Whittington - Cannon and Ball, Paul Nicholas and Ben Richards
- 2007 Cinderella - Joe Pasquale
- 2008 Aladdin - Chuckle Brothers, Robin Askwith
- 2009 Cinderella - Brian Conley
- 2010 Peter Pan - Bradley Walsh
- 2011 Aladdin - Shane Richie
- 2012 Cinderella - Shane Richie
- 2013 Snow White and the Seven Dwarfs - Craig Revel Horwood and Lisa Riley, Paul Burling
- 2014 Peter Pan - David Hasselhoff and Christopher Biggins
- 2015 Cinderella - Brian Conley and Lesley Joseph
- 2016 Robinson Crusoe and the Caribbean Pirates - Brian Conley and Gok Wan
- 2017 Jack and the Beanstalk - Lee Mead, Bobby Davro, Stacey Solomon, Robin Askwith
- 2018 Aladdin - Diversity
- 2019 Robin Hood and the Merry Men - Diversity
- 2021 Cinderella - Brian Conley
- 2022 Snow White and the Seven Dwarfs - Diversity, Myra DuBois, Pete Firman
- 2023 Peter Pan - Joe Pasquale and Rob Rinder
- 2024 Jack and the Beanstalk - Rylan Clark
- 2025 Cinderella - Rylan Clark, Ross King and Steve Hewlett
- 2026 Snow White and the Seven Dwarfs - Shane Richie, Faye Tozer

== He Built This City concert ==
On 13 February 2022, Cliffs Pavilion was the venue for a concert named He Built This City, held in honour of murdered Southend West MP Sir David Amess. The week culminated in Charles, Prince of Wales, officially granting city status to Southend-on-Sea. The concert included performers such as Digby Fairweather, Lee Mead and Leanne Jarvis.

== The BBC at the Cliffs ==
The BBC have completed live broadcasts or played recorded shows from the Cliffs over the years, including a special Silver Jubilee programme celebrating the first 25 years of the venue called Happy Anniversary! on 22 April 1989. Other shows have included:

- Big Band Special
- Friday Night is Music Night
- BBC Symphony Orchestra concerts
- I'm Sorry I Haven't A Clue
- Saturday Night is Gala Night
- Vienna-City of Song
- Treble Chance

== Sport at the Cliffs ==
The Cliffs, in addition to shows, comedy and music performances has hosted a variety of sporting events.

- The first televised professional wrestling event shown by the BBC came from the Cliffs on the 4 January 1965 featuring Mike Marino, the World Mid-Heavyweight Champion v Harlem Jimmy Brown from the U.S.A. The venue would continue to host wrestling.
- Boxing was previously a regular event at the Cliffs, including the 9 June 1971 Jack Solomons promotion featuring Dan McAlinden v Roberto Davila that was shown on the BBC, and the 1987 Terry Lawless/Matchroom Sport promotion featuring Gary Mason v Andre van den Oetelaar.
- The World Darts Federation hosted the 1982 WDF Europe Cup at the Cliffs, with the men's singles won by Bobby George, the women's singles by Sandra Gibb-Lee, the men's pairs by Stefan Lord and Bjørn Enqvist, while the women's pairs were won by Charlotte Eriksson and Carina Sahlberg.
- In 1986, 1987 and 1988, the Cliffs was the venue for the invitation only snooker event, the Matchroom Professional Championship.

== Party conferences and exhibitions ==
The Cliffs has hosted several political party conferences, with the National Conference of Labour Women taking place in 1967, while in 1993 it hosted the Young Conservatives annual conference.

The venue hosts a regular variety of exhibitions, from the Southend Art Club, career fairs to awards evenings.
