= 1986 Carlsberg Challenge =

Carlsberg Challenge
Tournament information
- Dates: 15–17 September 1986
- Venue: RTÉ Studios
- City: Dublin
- Country: Ireland
- Format: Non-ranking event
- Total prize fund: £33,000
- Winner's share: £12,000
- Highest break: Dennis Taylor (NIR) (138)

Final
- Champion: Dennis Taylor (NIR)
- Runner-up: Jimmy White (ENG)
- Score: 8–3

The 1986 Carlsberg Challenge was a non-ranking invitational snooker tournament, which took place between 15 and 17 September 1986. The tournament featured four professional players and was filmed in RTÉ Studios, Dublin, for broadcast on RTÉ.

Dennis Taylor won the tournament by defeating Jimmy White 8–3 in the final. Taylor received £12,000 from the total prize fund of £33,000 as winner.

== Prize fund ==
The breakdown of prize money for this year is shown below:

- Winner: £12,000
- Runner-up: £8,000
- Semi-final: £5,500
- Highest break: £2,000
- Total: £33,000

== Main draw ==
Results for the tournament are shown below.

Semi-finals; Best of 9 frames
Dennis Taylor (NIR)	5
Joe Johnson (ENG)	3
Jimmy White (ENG)	5
Alex Higgins (NIR)	1

Final; Best of 15 frames
Dennis Taylor (NIR)	8
Jimmy White (ENG)	3
