= 1987 Hong Kong Masters =

Hong Kong Masters
Tournament information
- Dates: 2–6 September 1987
- Venue: Queen Elizabeth Stadium
- Country: Hong Kong
- Organisation: Matchroom Sport and WPBSA
- Format: Non-ranking event
- Total prize fund: £75,000
- Winner's share: £30,000
- Highest break: 92 (Jimmy White)

Final
- Champion: (England) Steve Davis
- Runner-up: (Scotland) Stephen Hendry
- Score: 9–3

The 1987 Hong Kong Masters was a professional non-ranking snooker tournament held from 2 to 6 September 1987 at the Queen Elizabeth Stadium in Hong Kong. Eight professional players and eight local amateur players participated. Steve Davis won the title, defeating Stephen Hendry 9–3 in the final. The tournament was sponsored by billiard table manufacturers Riley.

The event was part of the World Series for the 1987–88 snooker season, a series of invitational snooker events organised by Barry Hearn of Matchroom Sport and Barrie Gill of CSS International, and endorsed by the World Professional Billiards and Snooker Association. Eight events were planned, but only three took place, which Hearn blamed on a sponsor withdrawing and competition for TV airtime with other sporting events.

The highest break of the tournament was 92 by Jimmy White, in the fourth frame of his semi-final match against Stephen Hendry.

== Prize Fund ==
- Winner: £30,000
- Runner-up: £12,000
- Semi-final: £8,000
- Quarter-final: £4,000
- Highest break: £1,000

== Main draw ==
First round Best of 5 frames
(England) Steve Davis	3
(Hong Kong) W. Chi Kuen	0
(Wales) Terry Griffiths	3
(Hong Kong) Stanley Leung	0
(Canada) Cliff Thorburn	3
(Hong Kong) Sunny Tong	1
(Northern Ireland) Dennis Taylor	3
(Hong Kong) Franky Chan	0
(England) Jimmy White	3
(Hong Kong) Kenny Kwok	0
(England) Willie Thorne	3
(Hong Kong) John Chan	0
(Scotland) Stephen Hendry	3
(Hong Kong) Gary Kwok	0
(England) Neal Foulds	3
(Hong Kong) Ivan Li	0

Quarter-finals; Best of 5 frames
(England) Steve Davis	3
(Wales) Terry Griffiths	0
(Canada) Cliff Thorburn	2
(Northern Ireland) Dennis Taylor	3
(England) Jimmy White	3
(England) Willie Thorne	0
(Scotland) Stephen Hendry	3
(England) Neal Foulds	2

Semi-finals; Best of 9 frames
(England) Steve Davis	5
(Northern Ireland) Dennis Taylor	4
(England) Jimmy White	2
(Scotland) Stephen Hendry	5

Final; Best of 17 frames
(England) Steve Davis	9
(Scotland) Stephen Hendry	3
