= 1987 Carling Challenge =

Carling Challenge
Tournament information
- Dates: 14–16 September 1987
- Venue: RTÉ Studios
- City: Dublin
- Country: Ireland
- Organisation: WPBSA
- Format: Non-ranking event
- Total prize fund: £35,000
- Winner's share: £12,500
- Highest break: Dennis Taylor (NIR) (140)

Final
- Champion: Dennis Taylor (NIR)
- Runner-up: Joe Johnson (ENG)
- Score: 8–5

The 1987 Carling Challenge was a non-ranking snooker tournament, which took place between 14 and 16 September 1987. The tournament featured four professional players and was filmed in RTÉ Studios, Dublin, for broadcast on RTÉ.

Dennis Taylor won the tournament for the second consecutive season defeating Joe Johnson 8–5.

== Main draw ==
Results are shown below.

Semi-finals; Best of 9 frames
Dennis Taylor (NIR)	5
Stephen Hendry (SCO)	3
Joe Johnson (ENG)	5
Neal Foulds (ENG)	4

Final; Best of 15 frames
Dennis Taylor (NIR)	8
Joe Johnson (ENG)	5
