= Canadian Masters (snooker) =

Professional snooker tournament in Canada

Tournament information
- Venue: Minkler Auditorium
- Location: Toronto
- Country: Canada
- Established: 1974
- Organisation(s): World Professional Billiards and Snooker Association
- Format: Ranking event
- Final year: 1989
- Final champion: (England) Jimmy White

The Canadian Masters was a professional snooker tournament.

== History ==
The tournament was first held in 1974 and was named Canadian Open in Toronto, Ontario, Canada. It was part of Canadian National Exhibition Week. It was however discontinued after it clashed with the early start of the Main Tour. The event was revived in 1985, and was retitled as Canadian Masters. It was an eight-man invitation event held at the CBC Television Studios. The tournament was sponsored by BCE in 1985 and 1986.

In 1987 the tournament became part of the World Series and Labatt's overtook sponsorship of the event. In 1989 it became the first ranking event held overseas, although only the stages from the last 32 were held in Canada. BCE sponsored the tournament, which was won by Jimmy White, who defeated Steve Davis 9–4 to win £40,000.

It was held in the Minkler Auditorium, with the crowd filling the 1000 seats (Seneca Village, 1750 Finch Ave E, Toronto M2H)

== Winners ==
Year	Winner	Runner-up	Final score	Season
Canadian Open (non-ranking)
1974	(Canada) Cliff Thorburn	(Northern Ireland) Dennis Taylor	8–6	1974/75
1975	(Northern Ireland) Alex Higgins	(England) John Pulman	15–7	1975/76
1976	(England) John Spencer	(Northern Ireland) Alex Higgins	17–9	1976/77
1977	(Northern Ireland) Alex Higgins	(England) John Spencer	17–14	1977/78
1978	(Canada) Cliff Thorburn	(England) Tony Meo	17–15	1978/79
1979	(Canada) Cliff Thorburn	(Wales) Terry Griffiths	17–16	1979/80
1980	(Canada) Cliff Thorburn	(Wales) Terry Griffiths	17–10	1980/81
Canadian Masters (non-ranking)
1985	(Northern Ireland) Dennis Taylor	(England) Steve Davis	9–5	1985/86
1986	(England) Steve Davis	(England) Willie Thorne	9–3	1986/87
1987	(Northern Ireland) Dennis Taylor	(England) Jimmy White	9–7	1987/88
Canadian Masters (ranking)
1988	(England) Jimmy White	(England) Steve Davis	9–4	1988/89
