= 1982 Tolly Cobbold Classic =

Tolly Cobbold Classic
Tournament information
- Dates: 22–24 February 1982
- Venue: Corn Exchange
- City: Ipswich
- Country: England
- Organisation: WPBSA
- Format: Non-ranking event
- Total prize fund: £8,500
- Winner's share: £2,000
- Highest break: Steve Davis (ENG) (105)

Final
- Champion: Steve Davis (ENG)
- Runner-up: Dennis Taylor (NIR)
- Score: 8–3

The 1982 Tolly Cobbold Classic was the fourth edition of the professional invitational snooker tournament, which took place between 22 and 24 February 1982 at the Corn Exchange in Ipswich, England.

Steve Davis won the tournament beating Dennis Taylor 8–3 in the final after taking a 6–0 lead. Davis won £2,000 as champion, and also took £105 for making the highest break of the tournament, 105, during his defeat of defending champion Graham Miles in the semi-finals.

== Main draw ==
Quarter-finals; Best of 5 frames
Steve Davis (ENG)	3
Willie Thorne (ENG)	0
Graham Miles (ENG)	3
Tony Meo (ENG)	0
Dennis Taylor (NIR)	3
Jimmy White (ENG)	1
Tony Knowles (ENG)	3
David Taylor (ENG)	0

Semi-finals; Best of 9 frames
Steve Davis (ENG)	5
Graham Miles (ENG)	2
Dennis Taylor (NIR)	5
Tony Knowles (ENG)	2

Final; Best of 15 frames
Steve Davis (ENG)	8
Dennis Taylor (NIR)	3
