= 1987 Matchroom Professional Championship =

Tournament information
- Dates: 4–7 November 1987
- Venue: Cliffs Pavilion
- City: Southend-on-Sea
- Country: England
- Organisation: Matchroom Sport
- Format: Non-ranking event
- Total prize fund: £125,000
- Winner's share: £50,000
- Highest break: Dennis Taylor (NIR) (141)

Final
- Champion: Dennis Taylor (NIR)
- Runner-up: Willie Thorne (ENG)
- Score: 10–3

The 1987 Matchroom Professional Championship was the second edition of the professional invitational snooker tournament which took place between 4 and 7 November 1987 in Southend-on-Sea, England.

The tournament featured seven professional players, all part of Barry Hearn's Matchroom Sport stable. The tournament was won by Dennis Taylor, who defeated reigning champion Willie Thorne 10–3 in the final.

Dennis Taylor beat Steve Davis 6–3 in the semi-finals after trailing 1–3.

== Prize fund ==
The breakdown of prize money for this year is shown below:

- Winner: £50,000
- Runner-up: £25,000
- Semi-final: £12,500
- Quarter-final: £7,500
- Highest break: £2,500
- Total: £125,000

== Tournament draw ==
Quarter-finals; Best of 11 frames
Neal Foulds (ENG)	6
Terry Griffiths (WAL)	2
Jimmy White (ENG)	2
Dennis Taylor (NIR)	6
Steve Davis (ENG)	6
Tony Meo (ENG)	5

Semi-finals; Best of 11 frames
Willie Thorne (ENG)	6
(England) Neal Foulds	5
(Northern Ireland) Dennis Taylor	6
(England) Steve Davis	3

Final; Best of 19 Frames
(England) Willie Thorne	3
(Northern Ireland) Dennis Taylor	10
