= 1988 Matchroom Professional Championship =

Tournament information
- Dates: 4–9 October 1988
- Venue: Cliffs Pavilion
- City: Southend-on-Sea
- Country: England
- Organisation: Matchroom Sport
- Format: Non-ranking event
- Total prize fund: £130,000
- Winner's share: £50,000
- Highest break: Steve Davis (ENG) (132)

Final
- Champion: Steve Davis (ENG)
- Runner-up: Dennis Taylor (ENG)
- Score: 10–7

The 1988 LEP Matchroom Professional Championship was the third and final edition of the professional invitational snooker tournament which took place between 4 and 9 October 1988 in Southend-on-Sea, England.

The tournament featured eight professional players, all part of Barry Hearn's Matchroom Sport stable. The tournament was won by Steve Davis, who defeated reigning champion Dennis Taylor 10–7 in the final, winning the first prize of £50,000. Davis also won the high break prize of £5,000 for a break of 132.

== Prize fund ==
The breakdown of prize money for this year is shown below:

- Winner: £50,000
- Runner-up: £25,000
- Semi-final: £12,500
- Quarter-final: £6,250
- Highest break: £5,000
- Total: £130,000

== Tournament draw ==
Quarter-finals; Best of 11 frames
Dennis Taylor (NIR)	6
Tony Meo (ENG)	4
Neal Foulds (ENG)	6
Terry Griffiths (WAL)	4
Jimmy White (ENG)	6
Cliff Thorburn (CAN)	4
Steve Davis (ENG)	6
Willie Thorne (ENG)	2

Semi-finals; Best of 11 frames
(Northern Ireland) Dennis Taylor	6
(England) Neal Foulds	3
(England) Jimmy White	4
(England) Steve Davis	6

Final; Best of 19 Frames
(Northern Ireland) Dennis Taylor	7
(England) Steve Davis	10
