= 1985 Grand Prix (snooker) =

Rothmans Grand Prix
Tournament information
- Dates: 19–27 October 1985
- Venue: Hexagon Theatre
- City: Reading
- Country: England
- Organisation: WPBSA
- Format: Ranking event
- Highest break: John Campbell (AUS) (119)

Final
- Champion: Steve Davis (ENG)
- Runner-up: Dennis Taylor (NIR)
- Score: 10–9

The 1985 Rothmans Grand Prix was a professional ranking snooker tournament that took place from 19 to 27 October 1985 at the Hexagon Theatre in Reading. A two table set-up meant that the televised stage at Reading could start at the last-32 stage.

The last-32 matches were played from 19 to 22 October. Tony Drago, in his first televised match, beat Eddie Charlton 5–3. Jimmy White beat Joe O'Boye 5–4 after trailing 2–4. Steve Longworth beat David Taylor 5–1. John Campbell made a tournament best break of 119 in the first frame of his match against Doug Mountjoy and took a 4–1 lead, before winning 5–2. Steve Davis beat Danny Fowler 5–1, Fowler making his television debut.

In the last-16 round, Peter Francisco made a century in the first frame of his match against Terry Griffiths. However Griffiths won the next three frames and eventually won 5–2. The following day, Steve Davis beat Alex Higgins 5–0, while Silvino Francisco beat Jimmy White 5–4 after winning the last three frames.

In the quarter-finals Steve Davis beat Silvino Francisco 5–2 despite losing two of the first three frames. Davis met Cliff Thorburn in the semi-finals, Thorburn beating Terry Griffiths 5–1. In the other half of the draw Dennis Taylor beat Cliff Wilson while Tony Knowles beat Kirk Stevens 5–4, the match going to the final black.

The final was a re-match of the 1985 World Championship final between Steve Davis and Dennis Taylor, the defending Grand Prix champion. Davis lead 6–1 at the end of the first session but Taylor fought back to lead 8–7 winning 6 consecutive frames. Eventually it was Davis this time who became champion winning 3 out of the last 4 frames to win 10–9. The match became the longest one-day final in snooker history. It lasted 10 hours and 21 minutes and it finished at 2.14am.

== Main draw ==
Last 32; Best of 9 frames
Dennis Taylor (NIR)	5
Rex Williams (ENG)	2
Tony Meo (ENG)	5
Eugene Hughes (IRL)	3
Cliff Wilson (WAL)	5
George Scott (ENG)	3
Tony Drago (MLT)	5
Eddie Charlton (AUS)	3
Tony Knowles (ENG)	5
Ray Edmonds (ENG)	2
John Campbell (AUS)	5
Doug Mountjoy (WAL)	2
Kirk Stevens (CAN)	5
Graham Miles (ENG)	2
Steve Longworth (ENG)	5
David Taylor (ENG)	1
Peter Francisco (RSA)	5
Wayne Jones (WAL)	3
Terry Griffiths (WAL)	5
Bob Harris (ENG)	3
Joe Johnson (ENG)	5
Mike Hallett (ENG)	4
Cliff Thorburn (CAN)	5
Mark Wildman (ENG)	2
Jimmy White (ENG)	5
Joe O'Boye (NIR)	4
Silvino Francisco (RSA)	5
Dave Martin (ENG)	3
Alex Higgins (NIR)	5
Neal Foulds (ENG)	3
Steve Davis (ENG)	5
Danny Fowler (ENG)	1

Last 16; Best of 9 frames
(Northern Ireland) Dennis Taylor	5
(England) Tony Meo	3
(Wales) Cliff Wilson	5
(Malta) Tony Drago	2
(England) Tony Knowles	5
(Australia) John Campbell	2
(Canada) Kirk Stevens	5
(England) Steve Longworth	3
(South Africa) Peter Francisco	2
(Wales) Terry Griffiths	5
(England) Joe Johnson	1
(Canada) Cliff Thorburn	5
(England) Jimmy White	4
(South Africa) Silvino Francisco	5
(Northern Ireland) Alex Higgins	0
(England) Steve Davis	5

Quarter-final; Best of 9 frames
(Northern Ireland) Dennis Taylor	5
(Wales) Cliff Wilson	2
(England) Tony Knowles	5
(Canada) Kirk Stevens	4
(Wales) Terry Griffiths	1
(Canada) Cliff Thorburn	5
(South Africa) Silvino Francisco	2
(England) Steve Davis	5

Semi-finals; Best of 17 frames
(Northern Ireland) Dennis Taylor	9
(England) Tony Knowles	6
(Canada) Cliff Thorburn	5
(England) Steve Davis	9

Final; Best of 19 frames
(Northern Ireland) Dennis Taylor	9
(England) Steve Davis	10

== Final ==
Final: Best of 19 frames. Referee: John Smyth; Hexagon Theatre, Reading, England, 27 October 1985.
Steve Davis; England	10–9	Dennis Taylor; Northern Ireland
First session: 60–57, 67–53, 67–6, 102–0 (93), 32–88 (60), 67–51, 73–60, Second session: 11–81, 63–16, 44–74, 28–64, 24–64, 16–113 (62), 8–108 (50), 10–56, 62–26, 60–18, 48–64, 71–30
93	Highest break	62
0	Century breaks	0
1	50+ breaks	3

== Qualifying ==
The leading 32 players started at the last 64 stage. Matches were over 9 frames. The final qualifying round took place in Bristol in September 1985.

Dennis Taylor (NIR) 5–1 Barry West (ENG)

Rex Williams (ENG) 5–2 Mike Watterson (ENG)

Tony Meo (ENG) 5–3 Tony Jones (ENG)

Eugene Hughes (IRL) 5–1 Sakchai Sim Ngam (THA)

Eddie Charlton (AUS) 5–1 Geoff Foulds (ENG)

Murdo MacLeod (SCO) 3–5 Tony Drago (MLT)

Ray Reardon (WAL) 4–5 George Scott (ENG)

Cliff Wilson (WAL) 5–1 Roger Bales (ENG)

Kirk Stevens (CAN) 5–0 Gerry Watson (CAN)

Dean Reynolds (ENG) 3–5 Graham Miles (ENG)

David Taylor (ENG) 5–2 Steve Newbury (WAL)

John Parrott (ENG) 2–5 Steve Longworth (ENG)

Doug Mountjoy (ENG) 5–1 Tony Chappel (ENG)

John Campbell (AUS) 5–4 Jimmy van Rensberg (RSA)

Tony Knowles (ENG) 5–1 Matt Gibson (SCO)

Dene O'Kane (NZL) 2–5 Ray Edmonds (ENG)

Cliff Thorburn (CAN) 5–0 Bill Oliver (ENG)

Mark Wildman (ENG) 5–4 Steve Duggan (ENG)

Joe Johnson (ENG) 5–2 Dave Gilbert (ENG)

Mike Hallett (ENG) 5–3 Bernie Mikkelsen (CAN)

Willie Thorne (ENG) 0–5 Wayne Jones (WAL)

John Virgo (ENG) 4–5 Peter Francisco (RSA)

Terry Griffiths (WAL) 5–4 Jack McLaughlin (NIR)

John Spencer (ENG) 4–5 Bob Harris (ENG)

Jimmy White (ENG) 5–0 Jack Fitzmaurice (ENG)

Perrie Mans (RSA) 3–5 Joe O'Boye (NIR)

Silvino Francisco (RSA) 5–2 Billy Kelly (IRL)

Dave Martin (ENG) 5–2 Mario Morra (CAN)

Alex Higgins (NIR) 5–1 Vic Harris (ENG)

Neal Foulds (ENG) 5-0 Mike Darrington (ENG)

Steve Davis (ENG) 5–0 Om Agarwal (IND)

Bill Werbeniuk (CAN) 1–5 Danny Fowler (ENG)
