= Fosters Professional =

Series of snooker tournaments

Tournament information
- Venue: RTÉ Studios
- Location: Dublin
- Country: Ireland
- Established: 1984
- Organisation(s): WPBSA
- Format: Non-ranking event
- Final year: 1988
- Final champion: (England) Mike Hallett

The Fosters Professional was the final name of a series of snooker tournaments which ran for five editions from 1984 to 1988. From 1984 to 1986 it was known as the Carlsberg Challenge and in 1987 was called the Carling Challenge. Mike Hallett was the final champion of the series, all of which were held at RTÉ Studios in Dublin, Ireland.

== Winners ==
The results of the finals were as below.

Year	Winner	Runner-up	Final score	Season
Carlsberg Challenge
1984	(England) Jimmy White	(England) Tony Knowles	9–7	1984/85
1985	(England) Jimmy White	(Northern Ireland) Alex Higgins	8–3	1985/86
1986	(Northern Ireland) Dennis Taylor	(England) Jimmy White	8–3	1986/87
Carling Challenge
1987	(Northern Ireland) Dennis Taylor	(England) Joe Johnson	8–5	1987/88
Fosters Professional
1988	(England) Mike Hallett	(Scotland) Stephen Hendry	8–5	1988/89
