= 1975 Pot Black =

Tournament information
- Dates: 28–31 December 1974 (broadcast 4 January – 19 April 1975)
- Venue: Pebble Mill Studios
- City: Birmingham
- Country: England
- Format: Non-ranking event
- Winner's share: £1,000
- Highest break: (England) Fred Davis (87)

Final
- Champion: (England) Graham Miles
- Runner-up: (Northern Ireland) Dennis Taylor
- Score: 81–27

The 1975 Pot Black was a professional invitational snooker tournament, which took place between 28 and 31 December 1974 in the Pebble Mill Studios in Birmingham, and featured eight professional players. All matches were one-frame shoot-outs.

Broadcasts were on BBC2 and started at 19:50 on Saturday 4 January 1975. Alan Weeks presented the programme with Ted Lowe as commentator and Sydney Lee as referee.

Dennis Taylor made his debut in this year's tournament and went on to reach the final losing to defending champion Graham Miles 81–27, making him the third player in a row to win back to back titles after John Spencer and Eddie Charlton.

== Main draw ==
=== Champions League ===
Player 1	Score	Player 2	Broadcast Date
(England) Graham Miles	111–35	(Wales) Ray Reardon	4 January 1975
(England) John Spencer	0–1	(Australia) Eddie Charlton	18 January 1975
(Wales) Ray Reardon	0–1	(England) John Spencer	1 February 1975
(Australia) Eddie Charlton	1–0	(England) Graham Miles	15 February 1975
(England) John Spencer	1–0	(England) Graham Miles	1 March 1975
(Wales) Ray Reardon	0–1	(Australia) Eddie Charlton	15 March 1975

=== Challengers League ===
Player 1	Score	Player 2	Broadcast Date
(Northern Ireland) Dennis Taylor	1–0	(England) John Pulman	11 January 1975
(England) Fred Davis	1–0	(England) Rex Williams	25 January 1975
(Northern Ireland) Dennis Taylor	0–1	(England) Fred Davis	8 February 1975
(England) John Pulman	1–0	(England) Rex Williams	22 February 1975
(England) Fred Davis	1–0	(England) John Pulman	8 March 1975
(England) Rex Williams	0–1	(Northern Ireland) Dennis Taylor	22 March 1975

=== Knockout stage ===
Semi-finals (29 March and 5 April 1975)
(England) Graham Miles	1
(Wales) Ray Reardon	0
(Northern Ireland) Dennis Taylor	1
(England) Fred Davis	0

Final (19 April 1975)
(England) Graham Miles	1
(Northern Ireland) Dennis Taylor	0
3rd place Play-off (12 April 1975)
(Wales) Ray Reardon	1
(England) Fred Davis	0
