= 1982 Irish Professional Championship =

Irish Professional Championship
Tournament information
- Dates: 9–13 March 1982
- Venue: Riverside Theatre
- City: Coleraine
- Country: Northern Ireland
- Format: Non-ranking event
- Total prize fund: £8,500
- Winner's share: £3,300
- Highest break: Dennis Taylor (NIR) (129)

Final
- Champion: (Northern Ireland) Dennis Taylor
- Runner-up: (Northern Ireland) Alex Higgins
- Score: 16–13

The 1982 Smithwicks Irish Professional Championship was a professional invitational snooker tournament, which took place between 9 and 13 March 1982. The tournament was played at the Riverside Theatre in Coleraine, Northern Ireland, and featured eight professional players. After many years as a challenge match, this was the first time the championship was held as a knockout event.

Dennis Taylor won the title beating Alex Higgins 16–13 in the final.

== Main draw ==
Round 1 Best of 11 frames
(Northern Ireland) Tommy Murphy | 6
(Republic of Ireland) Billy Kelly | 1
(Republic of Ireland) Eugene Hughes | 6
(Republic of Ireland) Dessie Sheehan | 1

Quarter-finals; Best of 11 frames
(Northern Ireland) Tommy Murphy | 6
(Republic of Ireland) Patsy Fagan | 2
(Republic of Ireland) Eugene Hughes | 6
(Northern Ireland) Jackie Rea | 0

Semi-finals; Best of 11 frames
(Northern Ireland) Dennis Taylor | 6
(Northern Ireland) Tommy Murphy | 2
(Northern Ireland) Alex Higgins | 6
(Republic of Ireland) Eugene Hughes | 2

Final; Best of 31 frames
(Northern Ireland) Dennis Taylor | 16
(Northern Ireland) Alex Higgins | 13
