= John Williams (snooker referee) =

Welsh snooker referee

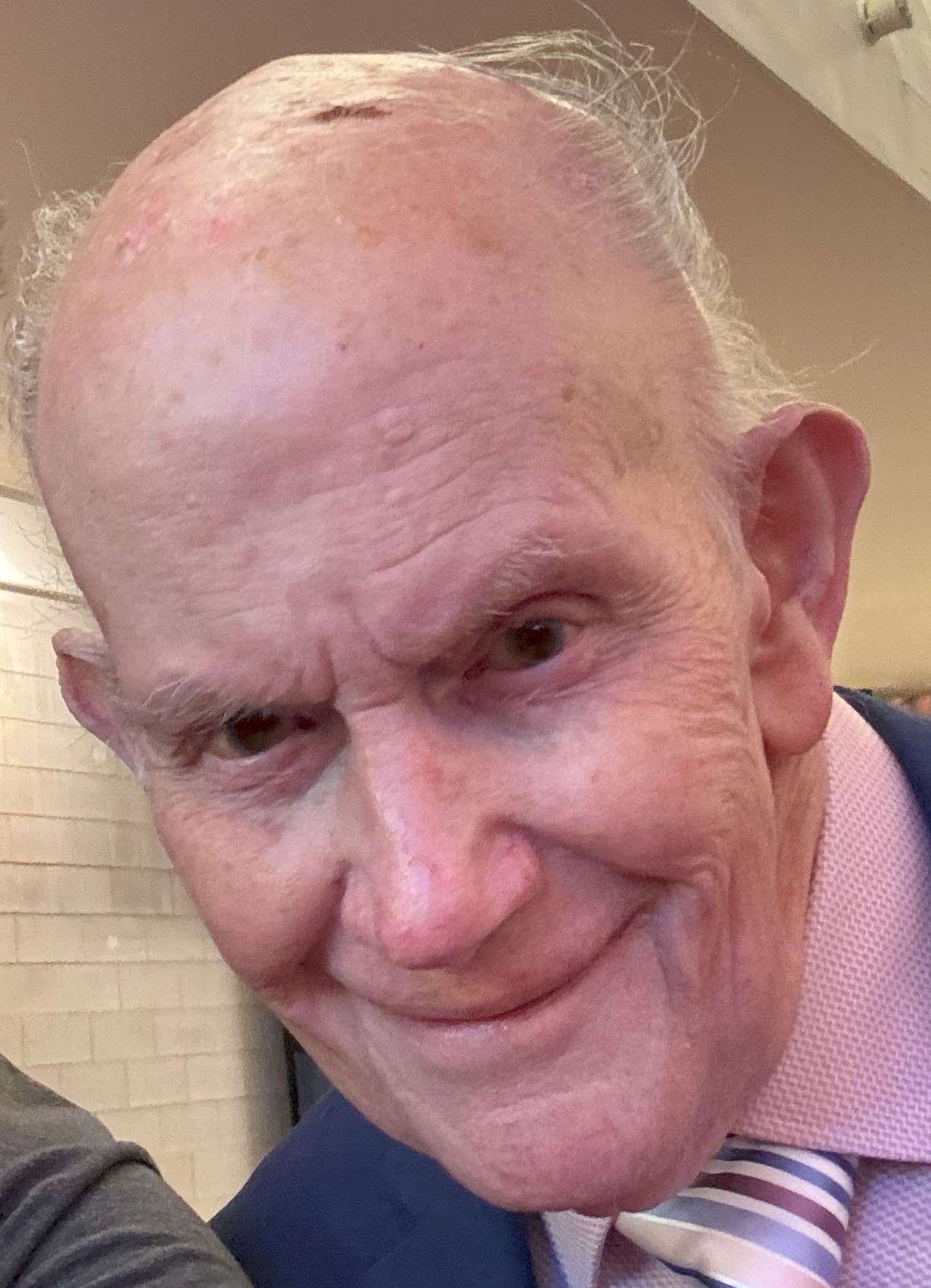
- Williams in 2025

Personal information
- Born: 8 June 1937 (age 89) Ruabon, Wrexham, Wales

Sport
- Country: Wales
- Sport: Snooker
- Professional: c.1960s–2002, 2011-2012

John Williams (born 8 June 1937) is a retired Welsh snooker referee. He refereed eleven World Snooker Championship finals, nine at the Crucible Theatre, including the 1985 final between Dennis Taylor and Steve Davis – the most watched snooker match in history. Having begun refereeing in the 1960s, Williams left the civil service in 1981 to work as a referee full-time. Having the chance to referee tournaments at Pontins, he quickly took charge and organised the events for many years. He gained national attention following a match between Fred Davis and Alex Higgins where the roof collapsed after rainfall and flooded the snooker table. Williams was pictured in many national newspapers after the event, resulting in more television coverage.

He was the longstanding referee for snooker television show Pot Black, taking charge after Sydney Lee's retirement at the 1981 event. Williams was forced into retirement in 2002 due to contract negotiations with the World Professional Billiards and Snooker Association, but made sporadic appearances at the World Seniors Championship until 2012.

== Early life ==
One of six siblings, Williams was born on 8 June 1937 in Ruabon, Wrexham, Wales. His father worked as a fan house attendant at Gresford Colliery, and his grandfather was British bar billiards champion in 1906. After passing his eleven-plus examination aged nine, Williams gained seven O Level qualifications at the end of his secondary education. He started work as a trainee metallurgist in the steel industry. He was offered the opportunity to join Bolton Wanderers F.C. as a professional football player, but declined the offer because his job in the local steelworks involved him working on Saturdays. After working in the steel industry for nearly 20 years, Williams became a civil servant at the Department of Employment, after a short stint employed in quality control at Pilkington Glass. He played snooker in a local league, and had a personal best break of 73. He married Joyce and they had one son. Following a divorce, Williams married Kathleen.

== Referee career ==
Williams started refereeing snooker matches during the mid-1960s, eventually leaving the civil service in 1981 to become a full-time referee. He was offered to referee matches at Pontins, where he began to run and organise the events for decades. At the 1973 World Snooker Championship, he refereed a quarter-final match between Fred Davis and Alex Higgins at the Manchester Exhibition Hall. The ceiling of the Hall was a glass dome, which had been covered in a tarpaulin to keep the sun off the table. Under the weight of rain, the dome broke and the table was flooded. This led to the press picturing Williams with the headline reading "rain stops play".

He refereed more World Snooker Championship finals than any other referee, his first at the Crucible Theatre being the 1978 final between Ray Reardon and Perrie Mans. Having also previously refereed the last session of the 1976 final, Williams took charge of eight other finals at the Crucible until 2002, including three that went to a deciding frame. (Note: The 2026 World Snooker Championship also went to a deciding frame 24 years later) He refereed the most viewed snooker match in history, the 1985 World Snooker Championship final between Steve Davis and Dennis Taylor where Taylor won on the final black in the deciding frame. Williams was also the referee during Cliff Thorburn's maximum break against Terry Griffiths in 1983, the first maximum in the history of the competition.

Williams last refereed the World Championship final in 2002, when Peter Ebdon beat Stephen Hendry in a deciding frame. In total, he officiated 11 World finals, including part of the finals in 1975 and 1976. In 1983, Williams received a two-year suspended prison sentence, after pleading guilty to selling non-existent snooker tables worth £6,500. This led to the World Professional Billiards and Snooker Association (WPBSA) expelling him as a referee, although he later won a legal battle to be reinstated. In 2003, he sued the WPBSA for wrongful dismissal after the WPBSA contracts for referees included a mandatory retirement age of 64, at a time when Williams was 65. He had believed that he had an agreement with the WPBSA that meant he could continue to work, but his contract was terminated at the end of July 2002.

As the popularity of snooker on television grew during the 1980s, Williams became a household name along with fellow top referees Len Ganley and John Street. Between them, Ganley, Street and Williams refereed 17 of the first 20 World Championship finals held at the Crucible Theatre. After Sydney Lee's retirement in 1980, Williams became the referee of the snooker television show Pot Black for the 1981 edition. He remained in the role for the remainder of the series and its revivals during the 1990s. He made a return to snooker refereeing when he officiated matches in the 2011 World Seniors Championship, and returned for the 2012 tournament.
