= Dennis Taylor =

Northern Irish former snooker player (born 1949)

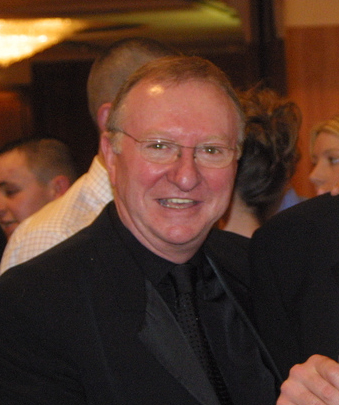
- Taylor in 2004

Personal information
- Born: 19 January 1949 (age 77) Coalisland, County Tyrone, Northern Ireland

Sport
- Country: Northern Ireland
- Sport: Snooker
- Professional: 1972–2000
- Highest ranking: 2 (1979/1980)

Tournament wins
- Ranking: 2
- World Championship: 1985

Dennis Taylor (born 19 January 1949) is a Northern Irish former professional snooker player and current BBC commentator from Coalisland, County Tyrone. He turned professional in 1972 and reached the World Snooker Championship semi-finals in 1975 and 1977, losing respectively to Eddie Charlton and Cliff Thorburn. He reached his first World Championship final in 1979, losing 16–24 to Terry Griffiths, but his run helped him attain a career-high world ranking of second for the 1979–80 season.

Taylor reached the World Championship semi-finals again in 1984, losing 9–16 to eventual champion Steve Davis. He won his first ranking title later that year at the 1984 Grand Prix, defeating Thorburn 10–2 in the final. He went on to reach the 1985 World Championship final, where he again faced Davis, who had won three of the previous four championships and was ranked world number one. Taylor lost the first eight frames but fought back to level the match at 11–11. He fell behind again at 11–13 and 15–17 but recovered to draw level at 17–17. The 68-minute deciding frame came down to a duel on the last black ball, which Taylor potted to win 18–17 and claim the only world title of his career. The match finished at 12:23 am before a television audience of 18.5 million, still a UK record for any post-midnight broadcast and for any programme on BBC Two. Taylor subsequently won the invitational 1987 Masters, defeating Alex Higgins 9–8 in the final. His highest career break was a 141, made at the 1987 Carling Challenge.

From 1983, Taylor wore snooker glasses designed by Jack Karnehm, which were often described as looking upside-down, giving him a distinctive signature look. He began commentating in the 1980s and has been a regular commentator on BBC snooker broadcasts since retiring from the professional tour in 2000. He competed on the World Seniors Tour until he retired from competitive play in 2021 at the age of 72. Outside snooker, he appeared on the third series of Strictly Come Dancing in 2005, finishing eighth with dance partner Izabela Hannah.

== Career ==
=== Early career ===
Dennis James Taylor was born on 19 January 1949 in Coalisland, Northern Ireland, the son of a lorry driver, and has six siblings. In 1966, Taylor left Coalisland to look for work in England and moved in with his aunt near Blackburn. He landed a job cutting out carpet patterns for cars, but left abruptly after nearly severing his little finger. He then worked 12-hour shifts at the Waterside paper mill, followed by a position as a weighbridge clerk and then for Relayvision, a television rental firm. He left his snooker cue at home, feeling he was unable to compete against more experienced English players, but found he was of equal skill at his local club. With a new cue he competed in the Blackburn league, winning the Accrington and District singles title and a Champion of Champions event. Taylor also played exhibition matches with professional and future champion John Spencer, who praised his abilities and gave him encouragement. Taylor won the 1968 British Junior Billiards Championship and the East Lancashire championship in 1970, which he won four times in five years. He was chosen to join the English amateur team against Wales and Scotland after making a 136 break, then a record for an amateur.

Taylor turned professional in 1972. That season he made his debut in the World Snooker Championship at the 1973 event, losing 8–9 to Cliff Thorburn in the first round. Over the next few years, Taylor reached the semi-finals at the event in 1975 where he lost 12–19 to Eddie Charlton, and 1977, losing to Thorburn 18–16. Two years later he reached the 1979 final, but lost 16–24 to qualifier Terry Griffiths. He reached his highest world ranking for the following season, second behind Steve Davis.

He reached the semi-final for a third time in 1984, losing to Davis. His mother died of a heart attack as he was beginning the new season at the 1984 Jameson International. He retired from the event before his quarter-final match against Silvino Francisco. However, he won the first ranking event of his career at the 1984 Grand Prix later that year defeating Thorburn 10–2 in the final.

=== World Snooker Champion ===
Following his first ranking tournament victory, Taylor played in the 1985 World Championship. Seeded 11th for the tournament, he defeated Francisco in the opening round 10–2, Eddie Charlton 13–6 in the second round, Cliff Thorburn 13–5, and Tony Knowles 16–5 to reach the final. In the final, he played three-time winner and world-number-one, Steve Davis. In the four session match, he trailed 0–7 after the first, but bounced back to trail 7–9 overnight after the second. Never being ahead, he recovered from 11–13 and 15–17 behind to level at 17–17, taking the match to a deciding frame. Trailing at 62–44 to Davis in the decider, with four coloured balls remaining, he potted a long brown ball. Taylor has said that the shot was one of his best ever under pressure. He also potted the blue and pink to bring the score to 62–59 with one ball, worth seven points, remaining. Both players missed a shot on the black, but it was finally potted by Taylor at 12:23 a.m. to win the championship.

The final has been voted by BBC viewers as the greatest snooker match in history and was broadcast to a peak audience of 18.5 million viewers in the United Kingdom. As of 2020 this is the highest viewership of any broadcast after midnight in the country, and a record for any programme shown on BBC2. On his return to Northern Ireland, Taylor was awarded the key to the city of Coalisland. He also received a victory parade that 10,000 attended.

=== Later career ===
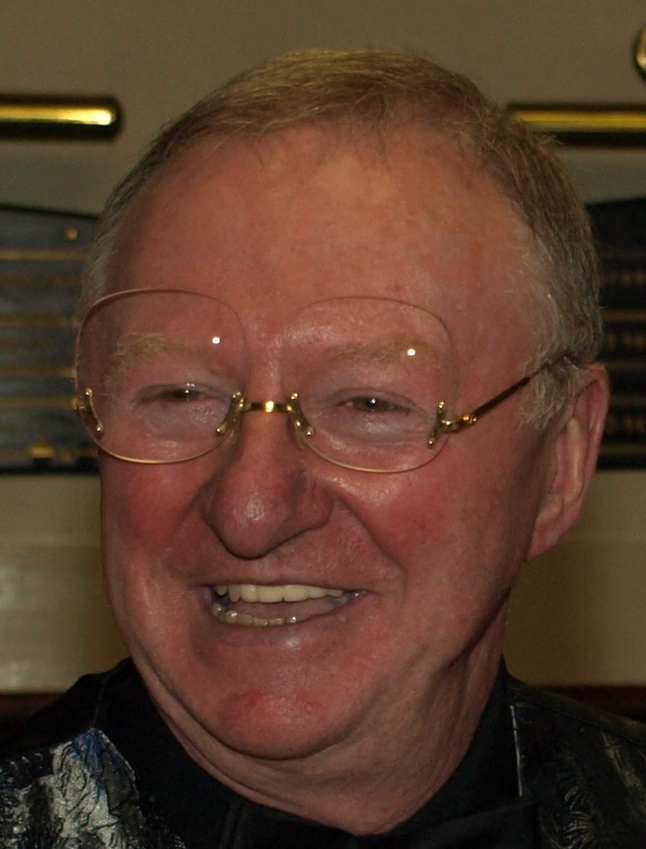
Taylor's oversized glasses were designed to be used whilst playing snooker.

Taylor reached his fourth ranking event final at the 1985 Grand Prix, later that year. He faced Davis again and went to a deciding frame, but this time was beaten 9–10. As of 2020 this was the longest one-day final in history with a playing time of over 10 hours. Defending his world title at the 1986 World Snooker Championship, Taylor lost 6–10 in the opening round to Mike Hallett. In 1987, Taylor reached the final of the Masters for the only time in his career, where he played countryman Alex Higgins. Despite trailing 5–8, Taylor won the match 9–8. This would be the last time a Northern Irish player won a Triple Crown event until Mark Allen won the 2018 Masters. Taylor made the highest break of his career, a 141, at the 1987 Carling Challenge, which he won, defeating Joe Johnson in the final.

At the 1990 World Cup, Taylor, Higgins, and Tommy Murphy formed a Northern Irish team. After failing to win the tournament, Higgins threatened Taylor, telling him "if you ever come back to Northern Ireland I'll have you shot". Shortly afterwards they met in the quarter-finals of the Irish Masters, and a determined Taylor won 5–2. In the next decade, his form dropped, and he fell out of the top 16 in the world rankings in 1995. Taylor retired as a professional in 2000.

Alongside other players managed by Barry Hearn (known as the Matchroom mob) and Chas & Dave, Taylor featured on the music single called "Snooker Loopy". The song spent 11 weeks in the UK Singles Chart in 1986, reaching a peak of sixth. Taylor wore distinctive glasses during matches, which had large frames and an unusual 'upside-down' structure that enabled a player to look through the lenses even when down on a shot. The spectacles were a joke in the song, and also commented on by John Virgo in other media. During his career, Taylor won the Irish Professional Championship on six occasions.

After retiring from the Tour, Taylor played matches on the World Seniors Tour and has been a snooker commentator and analyst for the BBC. In May 2021 after losing his match with Barry Pinches at the 2021 World Seniors Championship, Taylor announced that the match was his last competitive game.

On 27 April 2022, it was announced by fellow co-commentator John Virgo that they had been axed by the BBC and that the 2022-23 snooker season would be their last as commentators for the broadcaster. However, in late 2022 the BBC production team informed Virgo that they will be commentating for the "foreseeable future".

== Personal life ==
Taylor made regular guest appearances on snooker television game show Big Break. In 2005, he took part in the third series of Strictly Come Dancing, reaching eighth place with his partner Izabela Hannah. In 2017, he appeared on the second series of the BBC One reality TV programme The Real Marigold Hotel. In February 1990, Taylor opened the Royal Mail sorting office in Blackburn, Lancashire before playing a single-frame challenge match. Taylor currently lives in Llay near Wrexham. His son is a professional golf coach. Taylor supports Blackburn Rovers and Manchester United.

== Performance and rankings timeline ==
Tournament	1972/ 73	1973/ 74	1974/ 75	1975/ 76	1976/ 77	1977/ 78		1978/ 79	1979/ 80	1980/ 81	1981/ 82	1982/ 83	1983/ 84	1984/ 85	1985/ 86	1986/ 87	1987/ 88	1988/ 89	1989/ 90	1990/ 91	1991/ 92		1992/ 93	1993/ 94	1994/ 95	1995/ 96	1996/ 97	1997/ 98	1998/ 99	1999/ 00
Ranking	No ranking system				9	4		8	2	6	5	13	13	11	4	3	8	10	8	10	9		11	15	24	32	26	34	52	88
Ranking tournaments
British Open (Note: The event was also called the British Gold Cup (1979/1980), Yamaha Organs Trophy (1980/1981) and International Masters (1981/1982–1983/1984))	Tournament Not Held								Non-Ranking Event					QF	1R	QF	2R	1R	3R	QF	2R		1R	2R	2R	2R	2R	LQ	LQ	LQ
Grand Prix	Tournament Not Held											3R	1R	W	F	3R	F	SF	QF	2R	1R		3R	1R	1R	1R	1R	1R	LQ	LQ
UK Championship	Non-Ranking Event													2R	SF	2R	2R	3R	3R	1R	2R		2R	2R	2R	3R	2R	2R	LQ	LQ
China Open (Note: The event was also called the China International(1998/1999))	Tournament Not Held																											NR	LQ	LQ
Welsh Open	Tournament Not Held																				2R		1R	1R	2R	3R	2R	LQ	LQ	LQ
Malta Grand Prix	Tournament Not Held																								Non-Ranking Event					LQ
Thailand Masters (Note: The event was also called the Asian Open (1989/1990–1992/1993) and the Thailand Open (1993/1994–1996/1997))	Tournament Not Held												Non-Ranking Event				Not Held		1R	F	3R		2R	1R	1R	LQ	LQ	LQ	LQ	LQ
Scottish Open (Note: The event was also called the International Open (1982/1983–1984/1985 & 1986/1987–1996/1997) and the Matchroom Trophy (1985/1986))	Tournament Not Held										NR	QF	2R	WD	SF	3R	2R	QF	3R	Not Held			1R	2R	2R	2R	2R	LQ	LQ	LQ
World Championship	NR	LQ	SF	QF	SF	1R		F	2R	QF	1R	2R	SF	W	1R	2R	2R	2R	1R	QF	1R		QF	1R	LQ	LQ	LQ	LQ	LQ	LQ
Non-ranking tournaments
Champions Cup (Note: The event ran under a different name as the Charity Challenge (1994/1995–1998/1999))	Tournament Not Held																							F	1R	A	A	1R	A	A
Scottish Masters	Tournament Not Held										A	SF	A	A	QF	A	QF	NH	1R	A	1R		A	1R	A	LQ	A	LQ	A	A
The Masters	Not Held		A	1R	1R	QF		A	QF	1R	1R	A	1R	1R	QF	W	1R	1R	1R	1R	1R		1R	QF	A	A	A	A	A	A
Irish Masters (Note: The event was also called the Benson & Hedges Ireland Tournament (1974/1975–1976/1977))	Not Held		A	SF	RR	1R		A	RR	QF	QF	1R	SF	1R	QF	SF	1R	1R	F	SF	QF		1R	A	A	A	A	A	A	A
Premier League (Note: The event was also called the Professional Snooker League (1983/1984), Matchroom League (1986/1987 to 1991/1992) and the European League (1992/1993 to 1996/1997))	Tournament Not Held												F	Not Held		RR	RR	A	RR	RR	A		A	A	A	A	A	A	A	A
Pontins Professional	NH	A	QF	QF	RR	RR		A	A	QF	QF	SF	A	A	A	A	A	A	A	A	A		A	A	A	A	A	A	A	A
Former ranking tournaments
Canadian Masters (Note: The event was also called the Canadian Open (1978/1979–1980/1981))	Not Held		Non-Ranking								Tournament Not Held				Non-Ranking			QF	Tournament Not Held											
Hong Kong Open (Note: The event ran under different names such as the Australian Masters (1983/1984 to 1987/1988 and 1995/1996) and Australian Open (1994/1995).)	Tournament Not Held								Non-Ranking Event									NH	QF	Tournament Not Held					NR	NR	Tournament Not Held			
Classic	Tournament Not Held								Non-Ranking Event				1R	1R	3R	1R	QF	2R	2R	2R	2R		Tournament Not Held							
Strachan Open	Tournament Not Held																				2R		MR	NR	Tournament Not Held					
Asian Classic (Note: The event was also called the Dubai Masters (1988/1989), Dubai Classic (1989/90–1994/1995) and Thailand Classic (1995/1996))	Tournament Not Held																	NR	A	1R	QF		3R	1R	1R	1R	LQ	Not Held		
European Open (Note: The event was also called the Irish Open (1998/1999))	Tournament Not Held																	2R	1R	QF	3R		3R	2R	LQ	1R	LQ	NH	LQ	NH
German Open	Tournament Not Held																									LQ	LQ	LQ	NR	NH
Former non-ranking tournaments
World Championship	1R	Ranking Event																												
Norwich Union Open	NH	2R	1R	Tournament Not Held																										
Watney Open	Not Held		QF	Tournament Not Held																										
World Matchplay Championship	Tournament Not Held				1R	Tournament Not Held																								
Holsten Lager International	Tournament Not Held							QF	Tournament Not Held																					
Golden Masters	Tournament Not Held					SF		SF	Tournament Not Held																					
Bombay International	Tournament Not Held							RR	RR	Tournament Not Held																				
Pontins Camber Sands	Tournament Not Held								F	Tournament Not Held																				
Champion of Champions	Tournament Not Held							A	NH	RR	Tournament Not Held																			
Scottish Open	Tournament Not Held										F	Ranking Event								Not Held			Ranking Event							
Northern Ireland Classic	Tournament Not Held										QF	Tournament Not Held																		
Classic	Tournament Not Held								QF	F	QF	1R	Ranking Event										Tournament Not Held							
Tolly Cobbold Classic	Tournament Not Held							A	F	A	F	SF	A	Tournament Not Held																
UK Championship	Tournament Not Held					2R		2R	SF	QF	2R	2R	2R	Ranking Event																
British Open	Tournament Not Held								SF	SF	2R	LQ	LQ	Ranking Event																
Costa Del Sol Classic	Tournament Not Held													W	Tournament Not Held															
Singapore Masters	Tournament Not Held													A	RR	Tournament Not Held														
Kit Kat Break for World Champions	Tournament Not Held														W	Tournament Not Held														
Belgian Classic	Tournament Not Held														QF	Tournament Not Held														
Thailand Masters	Tournament Not Held												A	A	W	QF	Not Held		Ranking Tournament											
Malaysian Masters	Tournament Not Held													A	NH	F	Tournament Not Held									A	Tournament Not Held			
China Masters	Tournament Not Held														F	SF	Tournament Not Held									A	Tournament Not Held			
Hong Kong Open	Tournament Not Held								A	A	A	A	1R	1R	A	W	A	NH	R	Tournament Not Held					A	A	Tournament Not Held			
Carling Challenge (Note: The event was also called the Carlsberg Challenge (1984/1985–1986/1987))	Tournament Not Held													A	A	W	W	A	Tournament Not Held											
Tokyo Masters	Tournament Not Held																W	Tournament Not Held												
Canadian Masters	Not Held		F	QF	A	SF		A	QF	A	Tournament Not Held				W	QF	W	R	Tournament Not Held											
Asian Classic (Note: The event was also called the Dubai Masters (1988/1989))	Tournament Not Held																	QF	Ranking Event									Not Held		
Matchroom Professional Championship	Tournament Not Held															SF	W	F	Tournament Not Held											
New Zealand Masters	Tournament Not Held													Not Held			1R	A	QF	Tournament Not Held										
London Masters	Tournament Not Held																	QF	QF	A	Tournament Not Held									
Shoot-Out	Tournament Not Held																			1R	Tournament Not Held									
Norwich Union Grand Prix	Tournament Not Held																	SF	A	QF	Tournament Not Held									
World Masters	Tournament Not Held																			2R	Tournament Not Held									
Hong Kong Challenge (Note: The event was also called the Hong Kong Masters (1983/1984–1988/1989))	Tournament Not Held												A	A	QF	F	SF	SF	NH	A	QF		Tournament Not Held							
Indian Challenge	Tournament Not Held																				1R		Tournament Not Held							
World Seniors Championship	Tournament Not Held																				SF		Tournament Not Held							
World Matchplay	Tournament Not Held																	QF	QF	A	QF		A	Tournament Not Held						
Belgian Challenge	Tournament Not Held																				1R		Tournament Not Held							
Irish Professional Championship	Not Held			SF	SF	F	A	A	W	W	W	F	NH	W	W	W	F	A	Not Held		SF		A	Tournament Not Held						
Kent Classic (Note: The event was also called the Kent Cup (1986/1987–1987/1988 & 1989/1990–1990/1991))	Tournament Not Held															QF	A	A	A	A	NH		QF	Tournament Not Held						
European Challenge	Tournament Not Held																				QF	QF	SF	Tournament Not Held						
Pot Black	A	A	F	F	RR	RR		A	SF	A	RR	A	QF	SF	SF	Tournament Not Held					QF		1R	QF	Tournament Not Held					
Seniors Pot Black	Tournament Not Held																										SF	Not Held		

Performance Table Legend
LQ	lost in the qualifying draw	#R	lost in the early rounds of the tournament (WR = Wildcard round, RR = Round robin)	QF	lost in the quarter-finals
SF	lost in the semi-finals	F	lost in the final	W	won the tournament
DNQ	did not qualify for the tournament	A	did not participate in the tournament	WD	withdrew from the tournament

NH / Not Held	means an event was not held.
NR / Non-Ranking Event	means an event is/was no longer a ranking event.
R / Ranking Event	means an event is/was a ranking event.

== Career finals ==
=== Ranking finals: 6 (2 titles) ===
Legend
World Championship (1–1)
Other (1–3)

Outcome	No.	Year	Championship	Opponent in the final	Score	Ref
Runner-up	1.	1979	World Championship	(Wales) Terry Griffiths	16–24	
Winner	1.	1984	Grand Prix	(Canada) Cliff Thorburn	10–2	
Winner	2.	1985	World Championship	(England) Steve Davis	18–17	
Runner-up	2.	1985	Grand Prix	(England) Steve Davis	9–10	
Runner-up	3.	1987	Grand Prix (2)	(Scotland) Stephen Hendry	7–10	
Runner-up	4.	1990	Asian Open	(Scotland) Stephen Hendry	3–9	

=== Non-ranking finals: 41 (21 titles) ===
Legend
The Masters (1–0)
Other (20–20)

Outcome	No.	Year	Championship	Opponent in the final	Score	Ref
Runner-up	1.	1974	Canadian Open	(Canada) Cliff Thorburn	6–8	
Runner-up	2.	1975	Pot Black	(England) Graham Miles	0–1	
Winner	1.	1975	Ford/Riley Burwat Tournament	(Northern Ireland) Alex Higgins	4–2	
Runner-up	3.	1976	Pot Black (2)	(England) John Spencer	0–1	
Winner	2.	1976	Suffolk Invitation	(Canada) Cliff Thorburn	7–4	
Winner	3.	1976	Southsea Invitational	(England) Willie Thorne	4–1	
Winner	4.	1976	Ashton Club Jubliee Snooker Tournament	(Northern Ireland) Alex Higgins	5–2	
Runner-up	4.	1978	Irish Professional Championship	(Northern Ireland) Alex Higgins	7–21	
Runner-up	5.	1979	Bombay International	(England) John Spencer	Round-Robin	
Runner-up	6.	1980	Tolly Cobbold Classic	(Northern Ireland) Alex Higgins	4–5	
Winner	5.	1980	Irish Professional Championship	(Northern Ireland) Alex Higgins	21–15	
Runner-up	7.	1980	Pontins Camber Sands	(Northern Ireland) Alex Higgins	7–9	
Runner-up	8.	1980	The Classic	(England) Steve Davis	1–4	
Runner-up	9.	1980	Australian Masters	(England) John Spencer	Aggregate Score	
Winner	6.	1981	Irish Professional Championship (2)	(Republic of Ireland) Patsy Fagan	22–21	
Runner-up	10.	1981	International Open	(England) Steve Davis	0–9	
Runner-up	11.	1982	Tolly Cobbold Classic (2)	(England) Steve Davis	3–8	
Winner	7.	1982	Irish Professional Championship (3)	(Northern Ireland) Alex Higgins	16–13	
Runner-up	12.	1983	Irish Professional Championship (2)	(Northern Ireland) Alex Higgins	11–16	
Winner	8.	1984	Costa Del Sol Classic	(England) Mike Hallett	5–2	
Runner-up	13.	1984	Professional Snooker League	(England) John Virgo	Round-Robin	
Winner	9.	1985	Irish Professional Championship (4)	(Northern Ireland) Alex Higgins	10–5	
Winner	10.	1985	Thailand Masters	(Wales) Terry Griffiths	4–0	
Runner-up	14.	1985	China Masters	(England) Steve Davis	1–2	
Winner	11.	1985	Canadian Masters	(England) Steve Davis	9–5	
Winner	12.	1985	Kit Kat Break for World Champions	(England) Steve Davis	9–5	
Winner	13.	1986	Irish Professional Championship (5)	(Northern Ireland) Alex Higgins	10–7	
Winner	14.	1986	Australian Masters	(England) Steve Davis	3–2	
Runner-up	15.	1986	Malaysian Masters	(England) Jimmy White	1–2	
Runner-up	16.	1986	Hong Kong Masters	(England) Willie Thorne	3–8	
Winner	15.	1986	Carlsberg Challenge	(England) Jimmy White	8–3	
Winner	16.	1987	The Masters	(Northern Ireland) Alex Higgins	9–8	
Winner	17.	1987	Irish Professional Championship (6)	(Republic of Ireland) Joe O'Boye	9–2	
Winner	18.	1987	Tokyo Masters	(Wales) Terry Griffiths	6–3	
Winner	19.	1987	Carling Challenge (2)	(England) Joe Johnson	8–5	
Winner	20.	1987	Matchroom Professional Championship	(England) Willie Thorne	10–3	
Winner	21.	1987	Canadian Masters (2)	(England) Jimmy White	9–7	
Runner-up	17.	1988	Irish Professional Championship (3)	(Northern Ireland) Jack McLaughlin	4–9	
Runner-up	18.	1988	Matchroom Professional Championship	(England) Steve Davis	7–10	
Runner-up	19.	1990	Irish Masters	(England) Steve Davis	4–9	
Runner-up	20.	1995	Charity Challenge	(Scotland) Stephen Hendry	1–9	

=== Pro-am finals: 1 (1 title) ===
Outcome	No.	Year	Championship	Opponent in the final	Score	Ref
Winner	1.	1980	Pontins Camber Sands Open	(England) Geoff Foulds	7–5	

=== Team finals: 5 (3 titles) ===
Outcome	No.	Year	Championship	Team/partner	Opponent(s) in the final	Score	Ref
Winner	1.	1985	World Cup	Ireland	England	9–7	
Winner	2.	1986	World Cup (2)	Ireland	Canada	9–7	
Winner	3.	1987	World Cup (3)	Ireland	Canada	9–2	
Runner-up	1.	1987	World Doubles Championship	(Canada) Cliff Thorburn	(England) Mike Hallett (Scotland) Stephen Hendry	8–12	
Runner-up	2.	1990	World Cup	Northern Ireland	Canada	5–9	

=== Other wins ===
- World Trickshot Championship – 1997

== Bibliography ==
- Taylor, Dennis (24 October 1985). Frame by Frame: My Own Story. Queen Anne Press. ISBN 0-356-12179-8.
- Taylor, Dennis (25 September 1986). Natural Break. Macdonald. ISBN 978-0-356-12566-4.
- Taylor, Dennis (11 October 1990). Play snooker with Dennis Taylor. BBC Books. ISBN 0-563-36037-2.
