= 1985 Canadian Masters =

Canadian Masters
Tournament information
- Dates: 29 October – 2 November 1985
- Venue: CBC Television Studios
- City: Toronto
- Country: Canada
- Organisation: WPBSA
- Format: Non-ranking event
- Winner's share: £15,000

Final
- Champion: (Northern Ireland) Dennis Taylor
- Runner-up: (England) Steve Davis
- Score: 9–5

The 1985 BCE Canadian Masters was a professional non-ranking snooker tournament that took place between 29 October–2 November 1985 at the CBC Television Studios in Toronto, Canada.

Dennis Taylor won the tournament by defeating Steve Davis 9–5 in the final.

== Main draw ==
Quarter-finals; Best of 9 Frames
(Northern Ireland) Dennis Taylor | 5
(England) John Parrott | 1
(Wales) Ray Reardon | 5
(England) Tony Knowles | 2
(England) Steve Davis | 5
(Wales) Terry Griffiths | 4
(Canada) Cliff Thorburn | 5
(England) Jimmy White | 3

Semi-finals; Best of 15 Frames
(Northern Ireland) Dennis Taylor | 8
(Wales) Ray Reardon | 3
(England) Steve Davis | 8
(Canada) Cliff Thorburn | 1

Final; Best of 17 Frames
(Northern Ireland) Dennis Taylor | 9
(England) Steve Davis | 5
