= 1985 World Snooker Championship final =

Snooker match, held April 1985

Statistics prior to the final:
Statistic	Steve Davis	Dennis Taylor
	Pictured in 2010	Pictured in 2004
Nationality	English	Northern Irish
Best Finish	Winner (1981, 1983 and 1984)	Runner-up (1979)
World ranking	1	11
Referee	John Williams	

The 1985 World Snooker Championship final, also known as the black-ball final, was played on the weekend of 27–28 April 1985 at the Crucible Theatre in Sheffield, England. The final of the 1985 World Snooker Championship was between defending world champion Steve Davis and 1979 runner-up Dennis Taylor. It was Davis's fourth appearance in a final and Taylor's second. The best-of-35-frame match was split into four sessions. Davis won every frame in the first session to lead 7–0 and extended his lead to 9–1 in the second session but led 9–7 overnight and 13–11 after the third sessions. Until the match was over, Taylor was never ahead in frames but had tied the contest three times at 11–11, 15–15 and 17–17. The deciding frame culminated in a number of shots on the final black ball. After both players had failed to pot it several times, Taylor potted the black to win his only world championship. Media outlets reported this as a major shock: Davis had been widely predicted to win the match, having lifted three of the previous four world championship titles.

The final took place during the eighth year of the BBC's daily coverage of the championship and reached a climax in the early hours of Monday 29 April. It was viewed by 18.5 million people in the United Kingdom, which as of 2024 remains a record viewing figure for BBC2, and as of 2024 is still the record for a post-midnight audience for any British television channel. The total match time of 14 hours and 50 minutes is the longest ever recorded for a best-of-35-frames match. It is the only final at this venue to contain no century breaks.

The final is one of the most famous matches in snooker history and part of the reason for the surge in the sport's popularity in the 1980s and 1990s. Two hour-long BBC documentaries, When Snooker Ruled the World from 2002 and Davis v Taylor: The '85 Black Ball Final made in 2010, commemorated the event. The final frame was released in full on home video as "The Greatest Snooker Final of All Time". The post-match single-word responses to David Vine from Davis would later be used as a basis for a recurring caricature of him in the television show Spitting Image.

== Background ==
The World Snooker Championship is a professional snooker tournament first held in 1927 and becoming an annual event in 1969. The 1985 World Snooker Championship final was the culmination of the last world ranking event of the 1984–85 snooker season. The tournament featured a 32-participant main draw, with 16 seeded players and 16 players from a pre-tournament qualification competition. Matches at the event were played over a series of frames, the final being the best-of-35 frames over four sessions. The final was broadcast on the BBC for the eighth year in a row, with the winner receiving £60,000 (equivalent to £186,000 in 2025), the highest prize for a snooker event to that date.

=== Road to the final ===
Steve Davis, ranked as the world number one, overcame Neal Foulds 10–8 in the opening round in what was Davis's closest match until the final. He then played David Taylor in the second round, holding at least a three-frame lead throughout much of the match, and eventually won 13–4 after winning seven frames out of eight. Davis trailed for the first time at the event in the quarter-finals, as he played Terry Griffiths. Griffiths won the first four frames, but Davis won the next four to tie the match 4–4. With the scores even, Davis won six of the next eight to lead 10–6 after the second session and eventually won 13–6. In the semi-final, Davis required just three of the four scheduled sessions to overcome Ray Reardon 16–5.

Dennis Taylor, ranked 11, led Silvino Francisco 8–1 in the opening session, and won the match 10–2. In the second round, Taylor played Eddie Charlton where he won 13–6. Taylor played Cliff Thorburn in the quarter-finals, in a match full of slow play. He led 10–5 after an over nine-hour second session, but won the first three frames in the final session to win 13–5. In the semi-final Taylor lost the first two frames against Tony Knowles, but won 16 of the next 19 to win 16–5, the same scoreline as Davis.

Previous round scores
Round	Steve Davis		Dennis Taylor	
Round	Opponent	Result	Opponent	Result
First round	Neal Foulds (England)	10–8	Silvino Francisco (South Africa)	10–2
Second round	David Taylor (England)	13–4	Eddie Charlton (Australia)	13–6
Quarter-finals	Terry Griffiths (Wales)	13–6	Cliff Thorburn (Canada)	13–6
Semi-finals	Ray Reardon (Wales)	16–5	Tony Knowles (England)	16–5

== Match report ==
The final was played on 27–28 April 1985 at the Crucible Theatre in Sheffield, England. Davis went into the tournament as the defending champion. The two players had met twelve months earlier in the semi-finals of the 1984 World Championship, Davis winning 16–9, having only lost once to Taylor in nine matches. Davis was competing in his fourth world championship final, having reached the final and won in 1981, 1983 and 1984. Taylor was contesting his second final, having lost to Terry Griffiths 16–24 in 1979. Davis had never lost a prior ranking event final.

Taylor started the 1985 final with a break of 50 but lost that frame as Davis gained a firm advantage by whitewashing his opponent in the first session. Davis also won the first frame of the second session to lead 8–0. Taylor won the ninth frame on the pink after Davis missed a pot on the green. Davis led 9–1 but lost the last six frames of the session, as Taylor produced the highest break of the final, a 98, to trail 7–9 overnight. Davis won two of the first three frames on the second day, to lead 11–8, before Taylor tied the match at 11–11. Davis took both of the next two frames on the black to lead 13–11. Taylor won four of the next six and again drew level at 15–15. Davis won the next two frames to regain the lead at 17–15. Taylor then won the 33rd frame, followed by a 57 break in frame 34, to level the match at 17–17 and force a deciding frame.

=== The final frame ===
The 35th frame was the last of the final, and lasted 68 minutes. Davis led 62–44, with only the last four coloured balls on the table, worth 22 points. Taylor potted the brown ball from much of the length of the table and then the blue ball with a slowly played cut along the bottom cushion into the green pocket. He then sank a difficult pink ball into the same pocket from the opposite cushion. This left Taylor trailing 59–62 with only the black ball, worth seven points, remaining.

Taylor attempted a double into the left middle pocket. He missed, but the ball rebounded to a safe position at the top of the table. Davis then played a safety shot, putting the black near the middle of the baulk cushion and leaving the cue ball near the right-hand cushion, a little above the corner pocket. In response, Taylor again attempted to double the black ball, this time into the top-left corner pocket. The black missed but eventually landed above the left middle pocket to a safe position.

Davis's next attempt double-kissed and left Taylor with a middle-distance pot to the green pocket. Taylor missed the pot, which commentator Jim Meadowcroft described as "the biggest shot of his life". This left Davis a thin cut shot into the top-left corner. He over-cut the black, missed the shot and left the black in a reasonably-straightforward pottable position into the same pocket. Taylor made his way to the table and potted the black to win the match. The final finished at 12:23 a.m. on 29 April 1985.

After potting the ball, Taylor held his cue stick above his head and waggled his finger in celebration. He said in a 2009 interview that the gesture was aimed at his "good mate" Trevor East, whom he had told he would win. In a post-match interview with David Vine, Davis commented that the loss was "all there in black and white", and Taylor commented that the match was the greatest that he had been involved in. Taylor noted the importance of defeating Thorburn, whom he described as the "hardest player in the world", and Davis, whom he described as the "best player in the world". Taylor commented that as he had defeated Davis, he was "the best this year".

== Match statistics ==
The scores for the match are shown below. Scores in parentheses denote player breaks, while frames won are denoted by bold text and †.

Final: (Best of 35 frames) Crucible Theatre, Sheffield, 27 & 28 April. Referee: John Williams
Steve Davis (1); England				17–18				Dennis Taylor (11); Northern Ireland			
Players	Session 1: 7–0										
Frame	1	2	3	4	5	6	7	8	9	10	11
Davis	88^{†}	93^{†} (87)	49^{†}	65^{†}	95^{†} (55)	85^{†} (66)	83^{†} (58)	N/A	N/A	N/A	N/A
Taylor	50 (50)	0	2	38	1	6	20	N/A	N/A	N/A	N/A
Players	Session 2: 2–7 (9–7)										
Frame	1	2	3	4	5	6	7	8	9	10	11
Davis	121^{†} (64, 57)	49	76^{†} (57)	48	27	19	1	0	48	N/A	N/A
Taylor	0	59^{†}	27	63^{†}	75^{†} (61)	99^{†} (98)	71^{†} (70)	100^{†} (56)	77^{†}	N/A	N/A
Players	Session 3: 4–4 (13–11)										
Frame	1	2	3	4	5	6	7	8	9	10	11
Davis	25	72^{†}	66^{†}	45	2	1	64^{†}	58^{†}	N/A	N/A	N/A
Taylor	68^{†} (53)	43	58	80^{†}	73^{†} (57)	80^{†} (55)	56	46	N/A	N/A	N/A
Players	Session 4: 4–7 (17–18)										
Frame	1	2	3	4	5	6	7	8	9	10	11
Davis	86^{†} (86)	43	78^{†} (66)	29	4	29	66^{†}	81^{†}	47	24	62
Taylor	13	82^{†} (61)	17	84^{†} (70)	72^{†} (57)	83^{†} (79)	6	0	75^{†}	71^{†} (57)	66^{†}
87				Highest break				98			
0				Century breaks				0			
12				50+ breaks				10			
(Northern Ireland) Dennis Taylor wins the 1985 Embassy World Snooker Championship † = Winner of frame

== Legacy ==
The final is one of the most famous snooker matches of all time. The match holds several records. The final is the longest match ever held over the length of 35 frames at 14 hours and 50 minutes. The concluding moments of the final were watched by 18.5 million viewers, which as of 2026 is the most ever in the United Kingdom for a broadcast after midnight and for any BBC2 programme. Taylor lost in the opening round at the following year's event, and Davis lost again in the final to Joe Johnson 12–18. He won the next three championships between 1987 and 1989, winning the event six times in total. Davis and Taylor met on one further occasion, in the quarter-final of the 1991 World Snooker Championship, Davis winning comfortably 13–7. Taylor never reached the final again, but did win the Masters in 1987, again producing a comeback, this time against Alex Higgins.

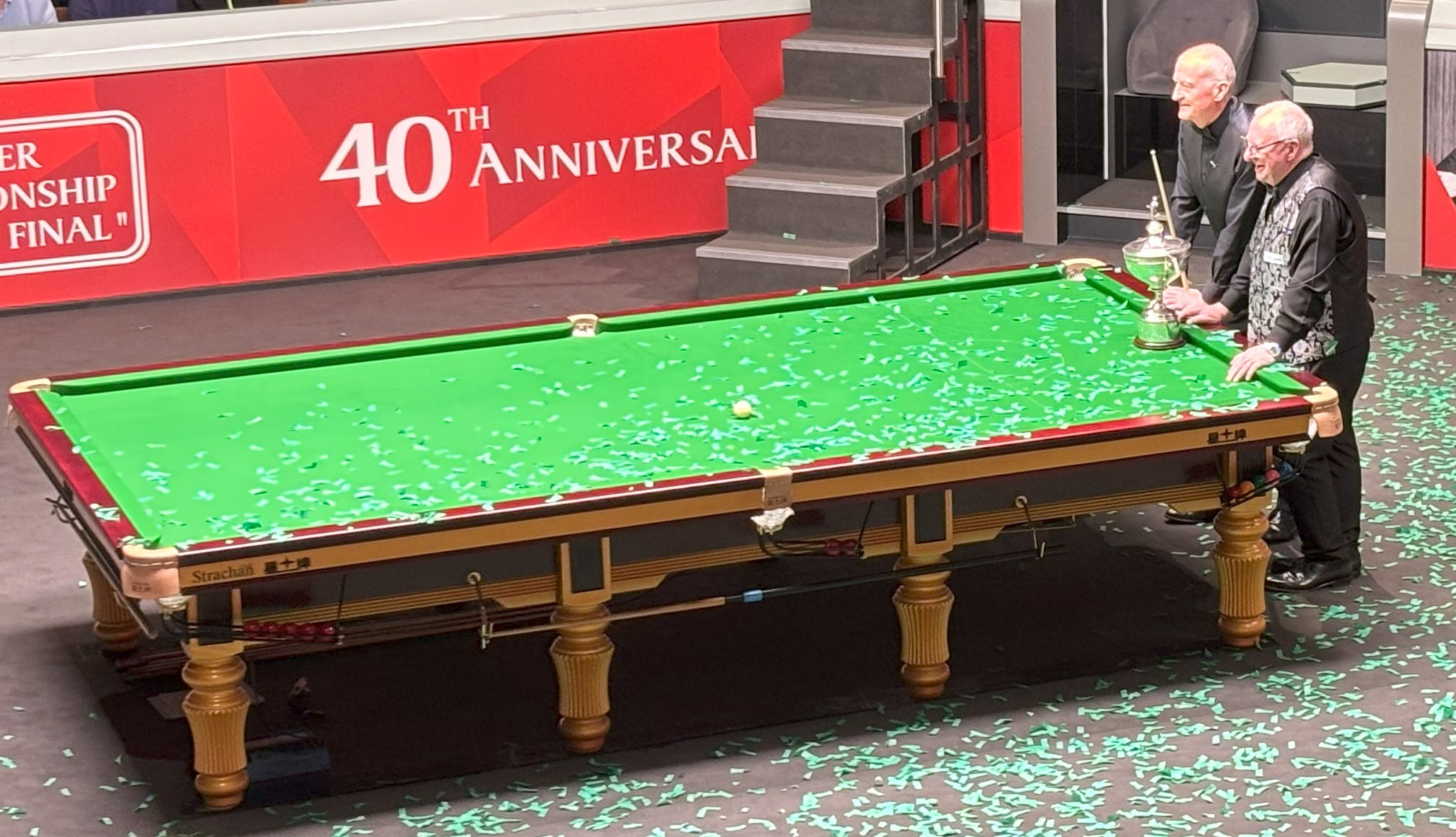
Steve Davis and Dennis Taylor at the Crucible Theatre during an event to celebrate the 40th anniversary of the final

Taylor's mother had died in September 1984, the year prior, so he had dedicated his win at the 1984 Grand Prix in October to her. His win at the world championship he also dedicated to his mother's life. On his return to Northern Ireland, Taylor received a victory parade in a Land Rover across his home town of Coalisland in front of 10,000 people. He was loaned mayoral robes on the day of the parade, and was accompanied by his wife and three children. He later signed a five-year contract with promoter Barry Hearn as his manager. The media described Davis as a "bad loser" for his silence and one-word responses to questions from David Vine at a press conference following the event. This was later used as the basis for a recurring caricature of Steve Davis on the television show Spitting Image.

Some months after the 1985 World Championship, a special programme was recorded in which both players watched the entire final frame and discussed it shot by shot. For the penultimate shot, where Davis missed the cut into the corner pocket, he stated "I was saying to myself, don't hit it thick" and "that's how you bottle it, by hitting it thick." He summarised: "although I missed the black, it wasn't that shot which lost the match. There were other shots earlier in the frame." In particular, Davis mentions how close he was to being able to pot a pink which he suggested changed the course of the match. The programme was later released on DVD as The Greatest Snooker Final of All Time by Retro Videos. The black-ball finish was voted the ninth greatest sporting moment of all time in a 2002 Channel 4 poll.

During the 2010 World Championship, Taylor and Davis 're-created' the final frame of the 1985 final. Performed in a distinctly irreverent manner, the "rerun" was noticeable for the fact that in attempting to replicate the missed shots on the final black, they instead ended up potting it on all but one attempt. The one attempt on the black they missed was the shot Taylor potted in the 1985 match to win the championship. BBC Two aired a one-hour documentary on the final, Davis v Taylor: The '85 Black Ball Final, presented by Colin Murray, after the conclusion of the coverage of the 2010 final. In 2025, the two players toured the UK, again "re-enacting" the last frame of the final.
