= 1984 Grand Prix (snooker) =

Rothmans Grand Prix
Tournament information
- Dates: 20–28 October 1984
- Venue: Hexagon Theatre
- City: Reading
- Country: England
- Organisation: WPBSA
- Format: Ranking event
- Total prize fund: £225,000
- Winner's share: £45,000

Final
- Champion: Dennis Taylor (NIR)
- Runner-up: Cliff Thorburn (CAN)
- Score: 10–2

The 1984 Rothmans Grand Prix was the first edition of the tournament under the Grand Prix name and had replaced the Professional Players Tournament name, which was used first in 1982. Total prize money was £225,000, then the largest in the history of snooker. Unlike the Professional Players Tournament, the BBC televised the event, which was held at the Hexagon Theatre in Reading, England. The venue had previously hosted the World Team Classic since 1981, an event formerly also televised by the BBC. The last-16 televised stages took place between 20 and 28 October 1984.

The last-16 matches were played from 20 to 23 October. Dean Reynolds beat Silvino Francisco 5–1, although television replays twice showed him committing fouls that went unnoticed by the referee.

Tony Knowles was the defending champion, however he lost 2–5 to Neal Foulds in the quarter-finals. Foulds met Dennis Taylor in the semi-finals, losing 3–9, having lost all seven frames in the afternoon session. In the other half of the draw, Cliff Thorburn beat Doug Mountjoy 5–3, while Steve Davis beat Dean Reynolds 5–0. Thorburn beat Davis 9–7 in the semi-finals.

Dennis Taylor won his first major tournament after 13 years as a professional by defeating Cliff Thorburn 10–2 in the final, emotionally dedicating the victory to his mother, who had died shortly before the tournament was held. He won the first prize of £45,000.

== Main draw ==
Last 16; Best of 9 frames
1	Tony Knowles (ENG)	5
Ian Williamson (ENG)	2
12	Willie Thorne (ENG)	1
Neal Foulds (ENG)	5
5	Ray Reardon (WAL)	3
11	Dennis Taylor (NIR)	5
Mike Hallett (ENG)	3
4	Kirk Stevens (CAN)	5
3	Cliff Thorburn (CAN)	5
10	Tony Meo (ENG)	4
15	Doug Mountjoy (WAL)	5
6	Eddie Charlton (AUS)	4
Silvino Francisco (RSA)	1
Dean Reynolds (ENG)	5
David Taylor (ENG)	1
2	Steve Davis (ENG)	5

Quarter-finals; Best of 9 frames
1	(England) Tony Knowles	2
(England) Neal Foulds	5
11	(Northern Ireland) Dennis Taylor	5
4	(Canada) Kirk Stevens	2
3	(Canada) Cliff Thorburn	5
15	(Wales) Doug Mountjoy	3
(England) Dean Reynolds	0
2	(England) Steve Davis	5

Semi-finals; Best of 17 frames
(England) Neal Foulds	3
11	(Northern Ireland) Dennis Taylor	9
3	(Canada) Cliff Thorburn	9
2	(England) Steve Davis	7

Final; Best of 19 frames
11	(Northern Ireland) Dennis Taylor	10
3	(Canada) Cliff Thorburn	2

== Final ==
Final: Best of 19 frames. Referee: John Williams; Hexagon Theatre, Reading, England, 28 October 1984.
Dennis Taylor; Northern Ireland	10–2	Cliff Thorburn; Canada
6–64, 74–50, 66–52, 33–70, 107–1, 81–38, 74–24, 112–22 (112), 96–27, 79–23, 80–20, 90–33
112	Highest break	
1	Century breaks	0

== Qualifying ==
Qualifying took place in Bristol earlier in October 1984. The leading 32 players started at the last 64 stage and needed to win two matches to reach the televised stage.

Last 64; Best of 9 frames
Tony Knowles (ENG)	5
Vic Harris (ENG)	1
John Dunning (ENG)	5
Perrie Mans (RSA)	4
Ian Williamson (ENG)	5
Bill Werbeniuk (CAN)	2
Joe Johnson (ENG)	5
Paul Medati (ENG)	1
Willie Thorne (ENG)	5
Steve Newbury (WAL)	2
Murdo MacLeod (SCO)	5
Warren King (AUS)	4
Neal Foulds (ENG)	5
Bert Demarco (SCO)	2
Tony Jones (ENG)	5
Terry Griffiths (WAL)	3
Ray Reardon (WAL)	5
Colin Roscoe (WAL)	1
Cliff Wilson (WAL)	5
Jim Donnelly (SCO)	2
Dennis Taylor (NIR)	5
Paul Watchorn (IRL)	1
John Virgo (ENG)	5
Malcolm Bradley (ENG)	0
Alex Higgins (NIR)	5
Roger Bales (ENG)	1
Mike Hallett (ENG)	5
Dessie Sheehan (IRL)	1
Rex Williams (ENG)	5
Dave Chalmers (ENG)	0
Kirk Stevens (CAN)	5
Tony Chappel (WAL)	3

Last 32; Best of 9 frames
(England) Tony Knowles	5
(England) John Dunning	1
(England) Ian Williamson	5
(England) Joe Johnson	4
(England) Willie Thorne	5
(Scotland) Murdo MacLeod	3
(England) Neal Foulds	5
(England) Tony Jones	0
(Wales) Ray Reardon	5
(Wales) Cliff Wilson	4
(Northern Ireland) Dennis Taylor	5
(England) John Virgo	3
(Northern Ireland) Alex Higgins	3
(England) Mike Hallett	5
(England) Rex Williams	3
(Canada) Kirk Stevens	5

Last 64; Best of 9 frames
Cliff Thorburn (CAN)	5
Gino Rigitano (CAN)	4
John Campbell (AUS)	5
Wayne Jones (WAL)	4
Tony Meo (ENG)	5
Pascal Burke (IRL)	1
Dave Martin (ENG)	5
Bob Chaperon (CAN)	4
Doug Mountjoy (WAL)	5
Eddie McLaughlin (SCO)	4
Mark Wildman (ENG)	5
Jack McLaughlin (NIR)	3
John Parrott (ENG)	5
Marcel Gauvreau (CAN)	3
Eddie Charlton (AUS)	5
Clive Everton (WAL)	1
Jimmy White (ENG)	5
Bill Oliver (ENG)	1
Silvino Francisco (RSA)	5
Steve Duggan (ENG)	3
Peter Francisco (RSA)	5
John Spencer (ENG)	2
Dean Reynolds (ENG)	5
Danny Fowler (ENG)	2
David Taylor (ENG)	5
Dene O'Kane (NZL)	1
John Rea (SCO)	5
Eugene Hughes (IRL)	4
Graham Miles (ENG)	5
Tommy Murphy (NIR)	3
Steve Davis (ENG)	5
Mario Morra (CAN)	2

Last 32; Best of 9 frames
(Canada) Cliff Thorburn	5
(Australia) John Campbell	1
(England) Tony Meo	5
(England) Dave Martin	1
(Wales) Doug Mountjoy	5
(England) Mark Wildman	0
(England) John Parrott	1
(Australia) Eddie Charlton	5
(England) Jimmy White	1
(South Africa) Silvino Francisco	5
(South Africa) Peter Francisco	4
(England) Dean Reynolds	5
(England) David Taylor	5
(Scotland) John Rea	1
(England) Graham Miles	0
(England) Steve Davis	5
