= 1989–90 snooker world rankings =

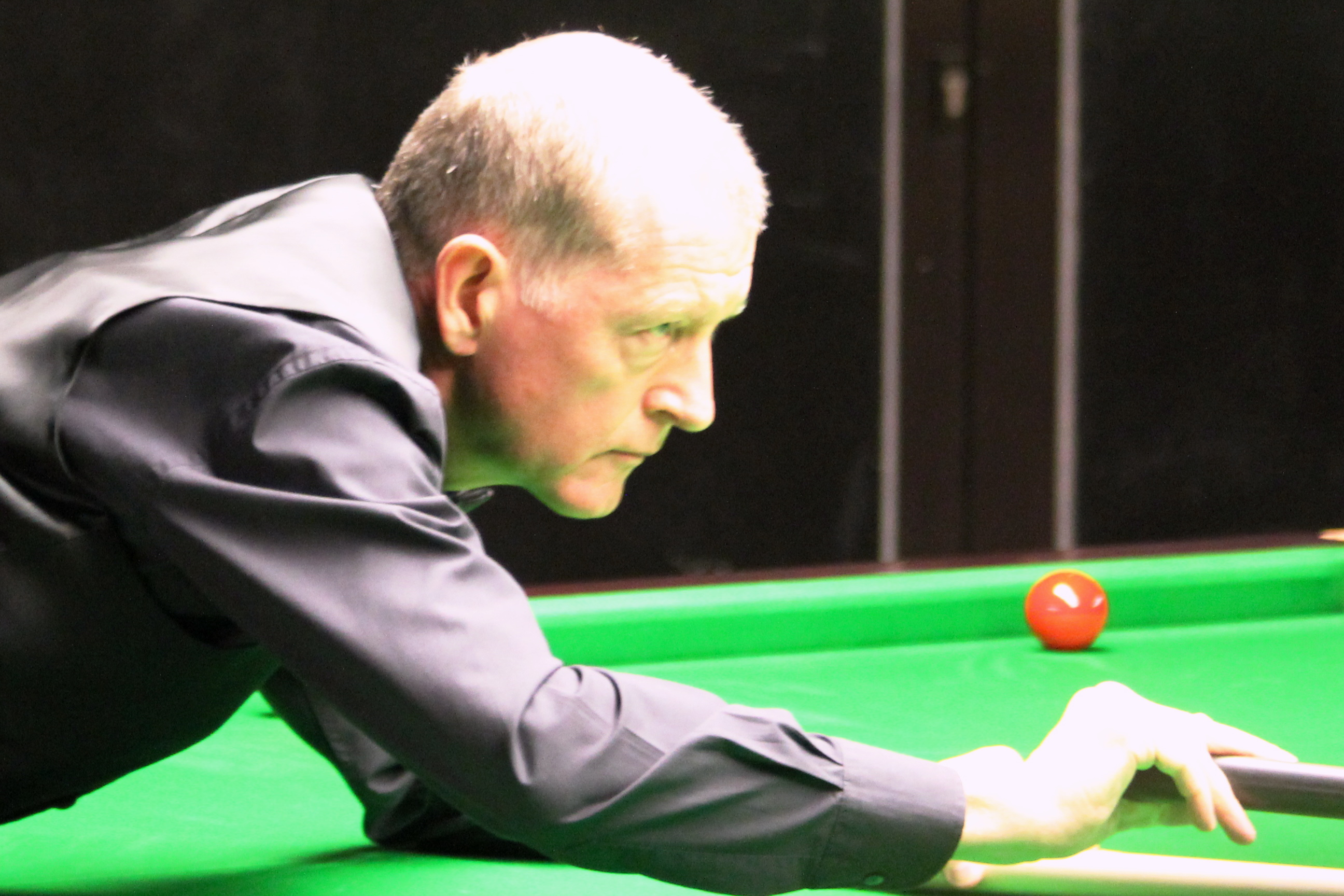
Steve Davis (pictured in 2012) topped the rankings for the seventh consecutive year.

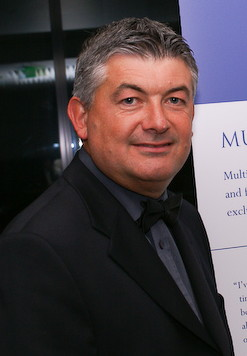
John Parrott (pictured in 2008) was ranked second.

The World Professional Billiards and Snooker Association (WPBSA), the governing body for professional snooker, first introduced a ranking system for professional players in 1976, with the aim of seeding players for the World Snooker Championship. The reigning champion would be automatically seeded first, the losing finalist from the previous year seeded second, and the other seedings based on the ranking list. Initially, the rankings were based on performances in the preceding three world championships. The 1983–84 snooker world rankings were the first to take tournaments other than world championship into account, and several additional tournaments were designated as ranking tournaments over the following years. The list for the 1986–87 snooker season was the first to only take account of results over two seasons, and the rankings for 1989–90 were also based on results from the preceding two seasons. Barry Hearn, the manager of a number of leading players including Steve Davis and Jimmy White, made a proposal to the WPBSA to change the system so that only the best seven performances from the ten ranking tournaments were counted. It was rejected at an extraordinary meeting of the WPBSA in May 1989.

Davis retained top place in the rankings for the seventh consecutive year. John Parrott moved up five places to second, followed by Stephen Hendry who improved by one place from fourth. The top 16 in the rankings were exempted from the qualifying rounds for the World Snooker Championship and were included in certain invitational events. Doug Mountjoy, Tony Meo and Dean Reynolds returned to the top 16, and Steve James joined the top 16 for the first time. Cliff Wilson, Neal Foulds, Silvino Francisco and Peter Francisco dropped out of the top 16. Of the players who had only competed for one season, Mark Johnston-Allen and Darren Morgan placed highest, at 51st and 52nd respectively. At the end of his first full season as a professional, Alain Robidoux rose from 102nd to 35th place.

In April 1987, Alex Higgins had been excluded from competing in the first two ranking tournaments of the 1987–88 season as part of a six-month ban imposed by the WPBSA, following a hearing conducted for the Association by Gavin Lightman, a barrister, after Higgins had been found guilty in court of headbutting the tournament director at the 1986 UK Championship. Thorburn had two ranking points deducted for "bringing the game into disrepute" due to failing a drugs test at the 1988 British Open, and was barred from the first two ranking events of the 1988–89 season as part of his punishment. Bill Werbeniuk was expelled from the WPBSA in March 1989 after not paying a fine that the Association had imposed for his use of a beta blocker medication, but was readmitted in September and allowed to play in the 1990 World Snooker Championship.

Davis did not compete in the 1989 European Open, a ranking event, citing exhaustion. Reynolds also missed the event, saying that he needed a rest. Both were fined £200 by the WPBSA for missing the event. Among the other players fined for missing events was Kirk Stevens, who was penalised £200 for his absence at the 1988 International Open.

== Points tariff and basis of ranking ==
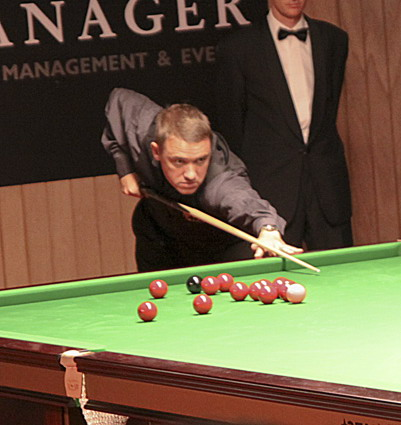
Stephen Hendry (pictured in 2010) was ranked third.

Points tariff contributing to the Snooker world rankings 1989–90
Placing	1988 and 1989 world championships	Other ranking tournaments 1987–88 and 1988–89
Champion	10	6
Runner-up	8	5
Losing semi-finalist	6	4
Losing Quarter-finalist	4	3
Last 16 Loser	2	2
Last 32 Loser	1 ranking point or 2 merit points (Note: Players who qualified received a ranking point. Players exempted until this round received two merit points.)	1
Final qualifying round loser	2 merit points	1 merit point
Penultimate qualifying round loser	1 merit point	1 A point
Antepenultimate qualifying round loser	1 A point	Frames won counted
Preliminary round loser	Frames won counted	–

Ranking was determined as follows:

- By number of ranking points.
- If players had an equal number of ranking points, precedence was given to the player with the better performances in the later season.
- If players were still equal, merit points were considered. If they were still tied, precedence was given to the player with the better performances in the later season.
- If players were still equal, A points were considered. If they were still tied, precedence was given to the player with the better performances in the later season.
- If players were still equal, frames won were considered. If they were still tied, precedence was given the player with the better performances in the later season.

== Rankings ==
Key:

- "(New)" denotes a player that was a new professional for 1988–89.
- "(NT)" denotes a non-tournament player, i.e. a player who was permitted to enter the world championship but no other tournaments in 1989–90.
- "N" denotes that as a non-tournament player, the player was not eligible to enter.
- "–" denotes that the player did not compete in the tournament.
- "X" denotes that the player was banned from competing in the tournament.

Snooker world rankings 1989–90
Ranking	Name	1987–88 season						1988–89 season								Ranking points	Merit	A points	Frames
Ranking	Name	IO	GP	UK	Cl	BO	WC	IO	GP	CM	UK	Cl	EO	BO	WC	Ranking points	Merit	A points	Frames
1	Steve Davis (ENG)	6	2	6	6	0	10	6	6	5	4	0	–	3	10	64	2	0	0
2	John Parrott (ENG)	2	4	3	5	4	2	0	1	3	3	3	6	4	8	48	1	0	0
3	Stephen Hendry (SCO)	4	6	0	3	6	2	2	1	4	5	3	2	2	6	46	1	0	0
4	Jimmy White (ENG)	2	1	5	2	3	6	5	3	6	1	0	4	1	4	43	1	0	0
5	Terry Griffiths (WAL)	1	2	3	3	1	8	0	3	3	4	2	5	0	4	39	2	0	0
6	Mike Hallett (ENG)	4	0	3	0	5	2	1	2	4	0	0	4	4	4	33	4	0	0
7	Cliff Thorburn (CAN)	5	1	3	1	4	6	X	X	3	3	4	3	2	0	33 (Note: Fined two points for failing a drugs test)	2	0	0
8	Dennis Taylor (NIR)	1	5	1	3	1	2	3	4	3	2	1	1	0	2	29	1	0	0
9	Willie Thorne (ENG)	1	3	4	1	2	2	2	0	1	2	4	2	2	2	28	1	0	0
10	Doug Mountjoy (WAL)	0	0	0	1	0	2	1	2	2	6	6	2	2	1	25	4	0	0
11	Joe Johnson (ENG)	0	1	4	1	2	2	3	1	1	2	2	2	3	0	24	3	0	0
12	Tony Knowles (ENG)	2	3	2	4	1	4	1	2	0	2	2	0	1	0	24	4	0	0
13	John Virgo (ENG)	3	1	1	2	1	1	1	0	2	3	2	2	1	2	22	1	0	0
14	Tony Meo (ENG)	1	0	1	1	0	0	3	1	0	0	1	0	6	6	20	7	0	0
15	Dean Reynolds (ENG)	0	0	0	1	0	0	4	1	1	2	1	–	5	4	19	6	0	0
16	Steve James (ENG)	2	0	0	0	1	4	4	1	2	1	1	0	0	1	17	4	1	0
17	Martin Clark (ENG)	2	1	0	2	0	0	0	0	1	1	3	3	3	0	16	4	0	8
18	Cliff Wilson (WAL)	1	2	1	1	1	1	0	2	2	1	1	1	2	0	16	3	0	0
19	Steve Newbury (WAL)	1	3	0	4	0	0	2	1	1	0	2	0	0	1	15	7	0	0
20	Neal Foulds (ENG)	1	0	0	1	2	4	1	2	0	1	1	0	2	0	15	6	0	0
21	Barry West (ENG)	0	0	1	2	1	1	3	1	0	3	0	0	2	0	14	7	0	0
22	Eddie Charlton (AUS)	3	2	0	0	0	2	0	1	1	0	0	3	0	2	14	7	0	0
23	Silvino Francisco (RSA)	2	1	2	2	1	0	1	0	0	1	2	0	0	2	14	6	0	0
24	Alex Higgins (NIR)	X	X	2	2	0	0	0	5	0	1	1	1	1	0	13	7	0	0
25	Peter Francisco (RSA)	0	4	1	2	1	1	0	0	0	1	0	0	3	0	13	8	0	0
26	David Roe (ENG)	1	1	2	0	2	0	0	0	0	2	0	1	1	2	12	4	2	0
27	Eugene Hughes (IRL)	3	0	1	0	0	0	1	2	0	0	1	1	1	1	11	7	0	0
28	Dene O'Kane (NZL)	0	0	2	0	3	0	1	1	0	1	1	0	1	1	11	3	3	0
29	Bob Chaperon (CAN)	1	3	0	0	1	1	2	1	0	0	1	0	0	1	11	6	0	0
30	Tony Drago (MLT)	0	2	0	1	0	4	1	1	0	0	1	0	1	0	11	8	0	0
31	Wayne Jones (WAL)	1	0	0	0	0	1	0	1	0	0	5	0	0	2	10	7	2	0
32	Rex Williams (ENG)	0	0	0	0	3	0	2	3	0	1	0	1	0	0	10	11	0	0
33	David Taylor (ENG)	1	0	1	1	0	0	2	0	2	0	2	0	0	0	9	10	0	0
34	Steve Longworth (ENG)	1	0	1	1	0	1	1	0	2	0	0	1	1	0	9	7	0	0
35	Alain Robidoux (CAN)	0	0	0	0	0	0	1	4	0	0	0	2	1	0	8	5	1	0
36	Danny Fowler (ENG)	0	0	2	0	0	1	0	0	1	2	0	2	0	0	8	8	0	0
37	Jim Wych (CAN)	1	1	1	0	0	0	2	0	0	0	0	3	0	0	8	6	3	0
38	Gary Wilkinson (ENG)	0	2	0	0	2	0	0	1	0	1	0	1	0	1	8	5	2	9
39	John Spencer (ENG)	1	0	0	1	2	0	2	1	1	0	0	–	0	0	8	9	0	0
40	Joe O'Boye (IRL)	3	0	0	0	3	0	0	0	0	1	0	0	0	1	8	6	4	0
41	Tony Chappel (WAL)	0	1	2	0	0	0	0	0	0	0	2	1	1	0	7	9	1	0
42	John Campbell (AUS)	0	0	2	0	1	1	1	0	0	0	0	2	0	0	7	6	3	0
43	Steve Duggan (ENG)	0	0	0	0	0	0	1	1	1	1	0	0	0	2	6	5	5	0
44	Paddy Browne (IRL)	0	0	0	0	1	0	0	0	0	0	3	1	0	1	6	3	7	0
45	Murdo MacLeod (SCO)	0	0	0	0	2	0	1	0	1	0	0	1	1	0	6	9	1	0
46	Nigel Gilbert (ENG)	2	0	0	0	0	0	0	3	0	1	0	0	0	0	6	8	2	5
47	Mark Bennett (WAL)	0	0	0	1	0	0	0	0	1	2	0	1	0	0	5	6	5	0
48	Colin Roscoe (WAL)	0	0	0	1	0	0	0	0	1	1	0	0	1	0	4	3	4	13
49	Ray Edmonds (ENG)	0	1	1	0	0	0	0	2	0	0	0	0	0	0	4	5	6	0
50	Kirk Stevens (CAN)	0	1	1	0	–	1	–	0	0	1	0	0	0	0	4	8	1	0
51	Graham Cripsey (ENG)	0	2	0	0	1	0	0	0	0	0	1	0	0	0	4	8	4	0
52	Mark Johnston-Allen (ENG) (New)	–	–	–	–	–	–	0	0	0	0	0	1	2	0	3	2	4	0
53	Darren Morgan (WAL) (New)	–	–	–	–	–	–	0	0	1	0	0	0	1	1	3	0	4	3
54	Ray Reardon (WAL)	0	0	0	0	1	0	0	0	1	0	1	0	0	0	3	9	2	0
55	Warren King (AUS)	0	0	0	0	0	1	0	0	2	0	0	0	0	0	3	6	6	0
56	Dave Martin (ENG)	0	0	0	3	0	0	0	0	0	0	0	0	0	0	3	12	2	0
57	Tommy Murphy (NIR)	0	0	1	2	0	0	0	0	0	0	0	0	0	0	3	9	3	0
58	Jack McLaughlin (NIR)	0	0	0	0	0	0	0	2	0	0	0	0	0	0	2	7	6	0
59	Ian Graham (ENG) (New)	–	–	–	–	–	–	0	0	2	0	0	0	0	0	2	3	2	10
60	Jim Chambers (ENG)	0	1	0	0	0	0	0	0	0	0	0	1	0	0	2	3	6	7
61	Roger Bales (ENG)	0	1	0	0	0	0	0	0	0	0	0	0	1	0	2	0	12	0
62	Tony Jones (ENG)	0	0	0	0	2	0	0	0	0	0	0	0	0	0	2	10	4	0
63	Dave Gilbert (ENG)	2	0	0	0	0	0	0	0	0	0	0	0	0	0	2	7	7	0
64	Mick Fisher (ENG)	0	2	0	0	0	0	0	0	0	0	0	0	0	0	2	2	9	5
65	Les Dodd (ENG)	0	0	0	0	0	0	1	0	0	0	0	0	0	0	1	12	2	0
66	John Rea (SCO)	0	0	0	0	0	0	1	0	0	0	0	0	0	0	1	8	3	12
67	Jon Wright (ENG)	0	0	0	0	0	0	0	0	0	0	1	0	0	0	1	7	7	0
68	Marcel Gauvreau (CAN)	0	0	0	0	0	0	0	0	1	0	0	0	0	0	1	3	10	0
69	Craig Edwards (ENG) (New)	–	–	–	–	–	–	0	0	0	0	0	1	0	0	1	2	3	5
70	Robert Marshall (ENG)	0	0	0	0	0	0	0	0	0	0	0	0	1	0	1	1	5	18
71	Tony Wilson (IOM) (New)	–	–	–	–	–	–	0	0	0	0	0	1	0	0	1	1	3	12
72	Nick Terry (ENG) (New)	–	–	–	–	–	–	0	0	0	0	1	0	0	0	1	1	4	4
73	George Scott (ENG)	0	0	0	0	0	0	0	0	1	0	0	0	0	0	1	1	6	14
74	Anthony Harris (ENG)	0	0	0	0	0	0	0	0	0	0	1	0	0	0	1	0	8	18
75	Ken Owers (ENG)	0	0	0	1	0	0	0	0	0	0	0	0	0	0	1	7	6	0
76	Martin Smith (ENG)	0	0	1	0	0	0	0	0	0	0	0	0	0	0	1	6	4	7
77	Robby Foldvari (AUS)	1	0	0	0	0	0	0	0	0	0	0	0	0	0	1	6	6	8
78	Graham Miles (ENG)	0	0	1	0	0	0	0	0	0	0	0	0	0	0	1	5	6	10
79	Brian Rowswell (ENG)	0	0	0	0	1	0	0	0	0	0	0	0	0	0	1	4	7	6
80	Paul Medati (ENG)	0	0	0	0	1	0	0	0	0	0	0	0	0	0	1	3	7	15
81	Pat Houlihan (ENG)	0	1	0	0	0	0	0	0	0	0	0	0	0	0	1	3	10	0
82	Paul Gibson (ENG)	0	1	0	0	0	0	0	0	0	0	0	0	0	0	1	2	3	4
83	Vic Harris (ENG)	0	0	1	0	0	0	0	0	0	0	0	0	0	0	1	0	6	14
84	Jim Donnelly (SCO)	0	0	0	1	0	0	0	0	0	0	0	0	0	0	1	0	4	30
85	Bill Oliver (ENG)	0	0	0	0	0	0	0	0	0	0	0	0	0	0	0	6	6	11
86	Mario Morra (CAN)	0	0	0	0	0	0	0	0	0	0	0	0	0	0	0	6	3	16
87	Malcolm Bradley (ENG)	0	0	0	0	0	0	0	0	0	0	0	0	0	0	0	5	7	11
88	Jim Bear (CAN)	0	0	0	0	0	0	0	0	0	0	0	0	0	0	0	5	3	27
89	Fred Davis (ENG)	0	0	0	0	0	0	0	0	0	0	0	0	0	0	0	5	5	13
90	Mick Price (ENG) (New)	–	–	–	–	–	–	0	0	0	0	0	0	0	0	0	3	3	4
91	Glen Wilkinson (AUS)	0	0	0	0	0	0	0	0	0	0	0	0	0	0	0	3	5	14
92	Ian Williamson (ENG)	0	0	0	0	0	0	0	0	0	0	0	0	0	0	0	3	7	15
77	Bob Harris (ENG)	0	0	0	0	0	0	0	0	0	0	0	0	0	0	0	3	6	11
94	Eddie Sinclair (SCO)	0	0	0	0	0	0	0	0	0	0	0	0	0	0	0	3	5	34
95	John Dunning (ENG)	0	0	0	0	0	0	0	0	0	0	0	0	0	0	0	3	4	28
96	Eric Lawlor (ENG)	0	0	0	0	0	0	0	0	0	0	0	0	0	0	0	3	5	16
97	Mark Wildman (ENG)	0	0	0	0	0	0	0	0	0	0	0	0	0	0	0	3	6	13
98	Steve Campbell (ENG) (New)	–	–	–	–	–	–	0	0	0	0	0	0	0	0	0	2	3	16
99	Mark Rowing (ENG) (New)	–	–	–	–	–	–	0	0	0	0	0	0	0	0	0	2	2	5
100	Terry Whitthread (ENG)	0	0	0	0	0	0	0	0	0	0	0	0	0	0	0	2	6	14
101	Anthony Kearney (IRL)	0	0	0	0	0	0	0	0	0	0	0	0	0	0	0	2	6	18
102	Mike Darrington (ENG)	0	0	0	0	0	0	0	0	0	0	0	0	0	0	0	2	4	27
103	Jimmy van Rensberg (RSA)	0	0	0	0	0	0	0	0	0	0	0	0	0	0	0	2	4	25
104	Jason Smith (ENG)	0	0	0	0	0	0	0	0	0	0	0	0	0	0	0	1	8	19
105	François Ellis (RSA)	0	0	0	0	0	0	0	0	0	0	0	0	0	0	0	1	6	13
106	Jack Fitzmaurice (ENG)	0	0	0	0	0	0	0	0	0	0	0	0	0	0	0	1	5	14
107	Steve Meakin (ENG)	0	0	0	0	0	0	0	0	0	0	0	0	0	0	0	1	4	21
108	Dennis Hughes (ENG)	0	0	0	0	0	0	0	0	0	0	0	0	0	0	0	1	4	17
109	Dessie Sheehan (IRL)	0	0	0	0	0	0	0	0	0	0	0	0	0	0	0	1	3	39
110	Mike Watterson (ENG)	0	0	0	0	0	0	0	0	0	0	0	0	0	0	0	1	2	25
111	Paul Thornley (CAN) (NT)	0	0	0	0	0	0	N	N	N	N	N	N	N	0	0	1	1	7
112	Matt Gibson (SCO)	0	0	0	0	0	0	0	0	0	0	0	0	0	0	0	1	9	14
113	Robbie Grace (RSA)	0	0	0	0	0	0	0	0	0	0	0	0	0	0	0	1	7	19
114	Paul Watchorn (IRL)	0	0	0	0	0	0	0	0	0	0	0	0	0	0	0	1	6	21
115	Jim Meadowcroft (ENG)	0	0	0	0	0	0	0	0	0	0	0	0	0	0	0	1	6	16
116	Gino Rigitano (CAN)	0	0	0	0	0	0	0	0	0	0	0	0	0	0	0	1	5	25
117	Jackie Rea (NIR)	0	0	0	0	0	0	0	0	0	0	0	0	0	0	0	1	2	23
118	Geoff Foulds (ENG)	0	0	0	0	0	0	0	0	0	0	0	0	0	0	0	0	9	17
119	Billy Kelly (IRL) (NT)	0	0	0	0	0	0	0	0	0	0	0	0	0	0	0	0	6	14
120	Greg Jenkins (AUS) (NT)	0	0	0	0	0	0	0	0	0	0	0	0	0	0	0	0	4	23
121	Ian Black (SCO) (NT)	0	0	0	0	0	0	0	0	0	0	0	0	0	0	0	0	4	15
122	Bernie Mikkelsen (CAN) (NT)	0	0	0	0	0	0	0	0	0	0	0	0	0	0	0	0	3	18
123	Patsy Fagan (IRL) (NT)	0	0	0	0	0	0	0	0	0	0	0	0	0	0	0	0	3	21
124	Pascal Burke (IRL) (NT)	0	0	0	0	0	0	0	0	0	0	0	0	0	0	0	0	2	22
125	Dave Chalmers (ENG) (NT)	0	0	0	0	0	0	0	0	0	0	0	0	0	0	0	0	2	29
126	Ian Anderson (AUS) (NT)	0	0	0	0	0	0	0	0	0	0	0	0	0	0	0	0	2	11
127	Frank Jonik (CAN) (NT)	0	0	0	0	0	0	0	0	0	0	0	0	0	0	0	0	2	8
128	Derek Mienie (RSA) (NT)	0	0	0	0	0	0	N	N	N	N	N	N	N	0	0	0	1	19
129	Jim Rempe (USA) (NT)	0	0	0	0	0	0	0	0	0	0	0	0	0	0	0	0	1	16
130	Joe Grech (MLT) (New) (NT)	–	–	–	–	–	–	0	0	0	0	0	0	0	0	0	0	1	0
131	Derek Heaton (ENG) (NT)	0	0	0	0	0	0	N	N	N	N	N	N	N	0	0	0	1	15
132	Clive Everton (WAL) (NT)	0	0	0	0	0	0	N	N	N	N	N	N	N	0	0	0	1	10
133	David Greaves (ENG) (NT)	0	0	0	0	0	0	N	N	N	N	N	N	N	0	0	0	0	12
134	Bernard Bennett (ENG) (NT)	0	0	0	0	0	0	N	N	N	N	N	N	N	0	0	0	0	9
135	Maurice Parkin (ENG) (NT)	0	0	0	0	0	0	N	N	N	N	N	N	N	0	0	0	0	6
136	John Hargreaves (ENG) (NT)	0	0	0	0	0	0	N	N	N	N	N	N	N	0	0	0	0	4
137	Bert Demarco (SCO) (NT)	0	0	0	0	0	0	N	N	N	N	N	N	N	0	0	0	0	2
138	Eddie McLaughlin (SCO) (NT)	0	0	0	0	0	0	N	N	N	N	N	N	N	0	0	0	0	1
139	Joe Cagianello (CAN) (NT)	0	0	0	0	0	0	N	N	N	N	N	N	N	0	0	0	0	0
140	Mike Hines (RSA) (NT)	0	0	0	0	0	0	N	N	N	N	N	N	N	0	0	0	0	0
141	Lou Condo (AUS) (NT)	0	0	0	0	0	0	N	N	N	N	N	N	N	–	0	0	0	0
142	Manuel Francisco (RSA) (NT)	–	–	–	–	–	–	N	N	N	N	N	N	N	0	0	0	0	0
143	James Giannaros (AUS) (NT)	0	0	0	0	0	0	N	N	N	N	N	N	N	0	0	0	0	0
144	Steve Mizerak (USA) (NT)	–	–	–	–	–	0	N	N	N	N	N	N	N	0	0	0	0	0
145	Paddy Morgan (AUS) (NT)	0	0	0	0	0	0	N	N	N	N	N	N	N	0	0	0	0	0
146	Wayne Sanderson (CAN) (NT)	–	–	–	–	–	–	N	N	N	N	N	N	N	–	0	0	0	0
147	Gerry Watson (CAN) (NT)	–	–	–	–	–	–	N	N	N	N	N	N	N	–	0	0	0	0

Preceded by 1988–1989	1989–1990	Succeeded by 1990–1991
