= 1988–89 snooker world rankings =

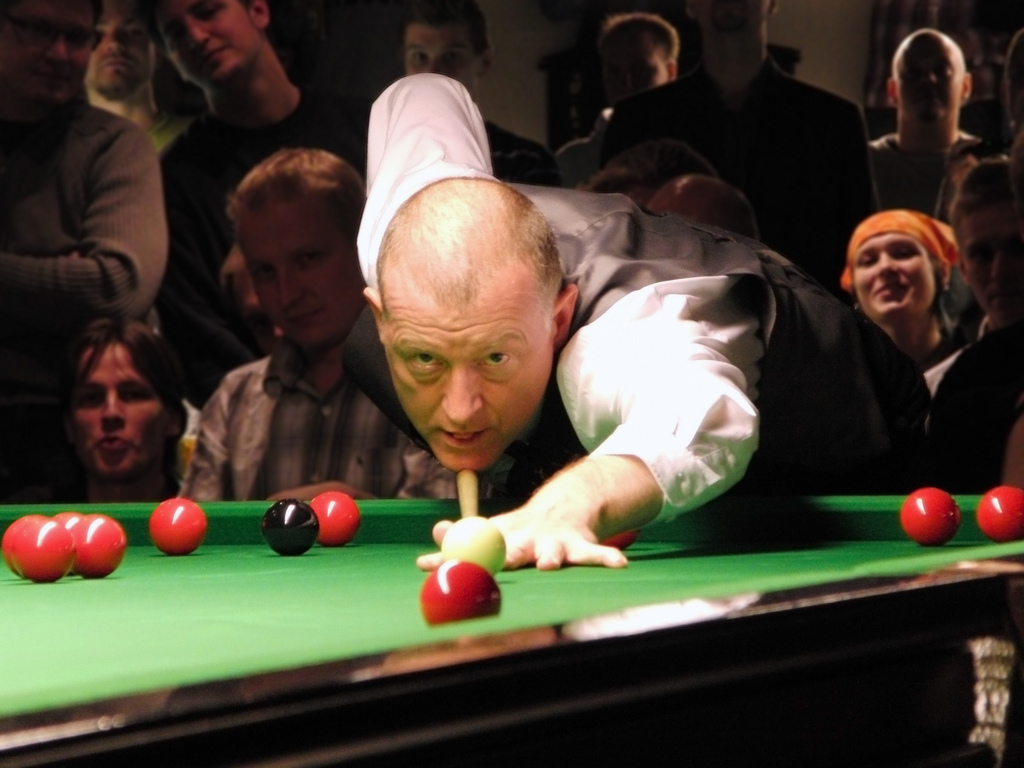
Steve Davis (pictured in 2008) was ranked in first place for the sixth consecutive year.

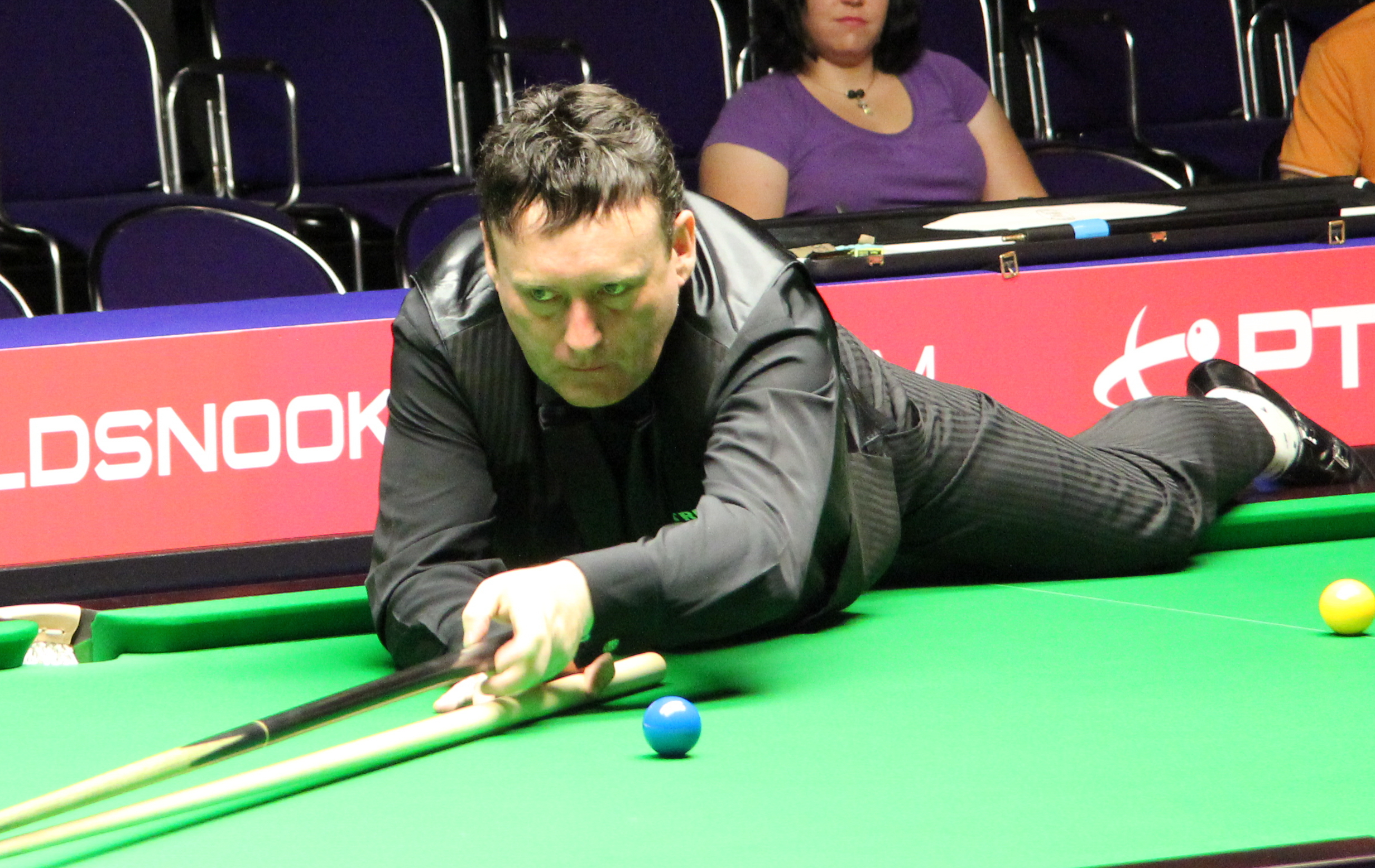
Jimmy White (pictured in 2011) retained second place in the rankings.

The World Professional Billiards and Snooker Association (WPBSA), the governing body for professional snooker, first introduced a ranking system for professional players in 1976, with the aim of seeding players for the World Snooker Championship. The reigning champion would be automatically seeded first, the losing finalist from the previous year seeded second, and the other seedings based on the ranking list. Initially, the rankings were based on performances in the preceding three world championships. The list for the 1986–87 snooker season was the first to only take account of results over two seasons, and the rankings for 1988–89 were also based on results from the preceding two seasons.

Being ranked in the top 16 exempted players from the qualifying rounds for the World Snooker Championship and also meant inclusion in certain invitational events. The top 32 ranked players were exempt from the early qualifying rounds of the other ranking tournaments.

The top three players in the 1987–88 rankings retained their positions for 1988–89. Steve Davis was ranked first, with 59 points, ahead of Jimmy White with 44 and Neal Foulds with 34. In fourth place, with 33 points, was Stephen Hendry, who rose from 23rd position on the previous year's list. The other players to join the top 16 were Peter Francisco, John Virgo, and Cliff Wilson.

The players dropping out of the top 16 were Alex Higgins, Rex Williams, Dean Reynolds and Doug Mountjoy. It was first time since the rankings were instituted in 1976–77 that Higgins was not among the top 16. In April 1987, he had been excluded from competing in the first two ranking tournaments of the 1987–88 season as part of a six-month ban imposed by the WPBSA, following a hearing conducted for the Association by Gavin Lightman, a barrister. Higgins, who had previously been disciplined by the Association on several occasions, had earlier been found guilty in court of headbutting the tournament director at the 1986 UK Championship, and the hearing considered this and other matters including altercations with referees and a complaint by representatives of Cliff Thorburn that Higgins had alleged in newspaper articles that Thorburn used drugs.

In May 1988, Thorburn had two ranking points deducted for "bringing the game into disrepute" due to failing a drugs test at the 1988 British Open. Thorburn had been found to have small traces of cocaine in his urine sample. Thorburn was also barred from the first two ranking events of the 1988–89 season as part of his punishment. Without the deduction of the two points, Thorburn would have been ranked a place higher, at fifth.

Of the players who had only been competing professionally for one season, Martin Clark was the highest-ranked, at 41st, with Gary Wilkinson at 44th the next-highest. Alain Robidoux received two walkovers at the 1988 World Snooker Championship before losing in the third round and gained a ranking of 102nd without winning a match.

== Points tariff and basis of ranking ==
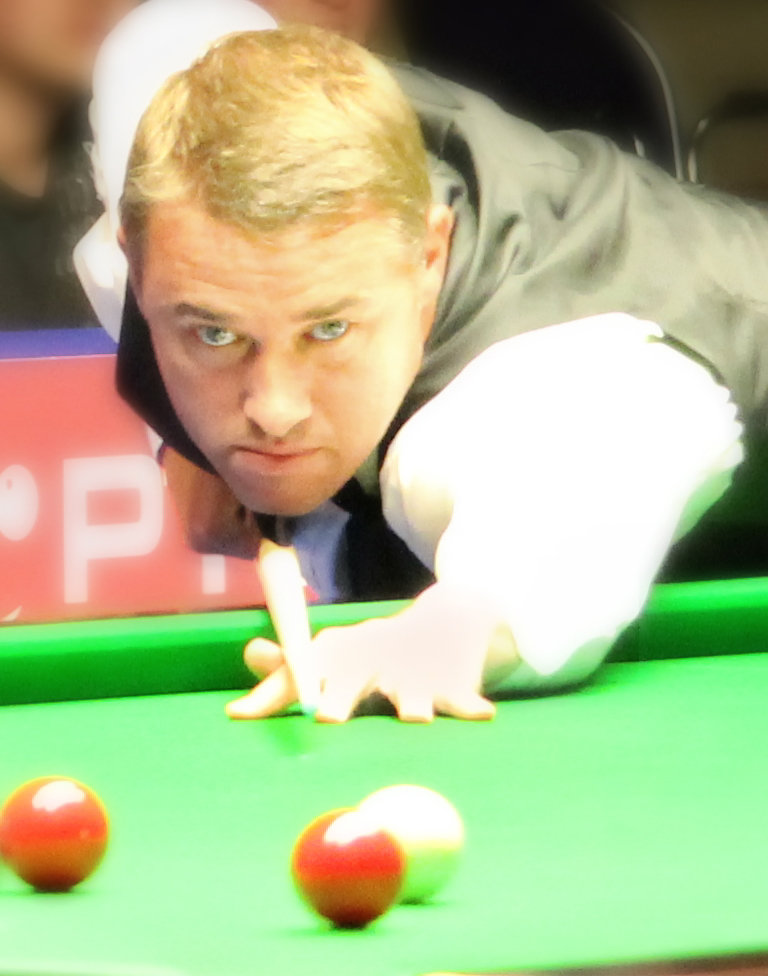
Stephen Hendry (pictured in 2010) won two ranking titles in the 1987–88 season.

The placings in the 1988–89 rankings were determined by players' performances in the ranking tournaments held across two seasons, from 1986 to 1988. From the 1986–87 season they were the 1986 International Open won by Foulds; the 1986 Grand Prix and the 1987 British Open both won by White; and the 1986 UK Championship, the 1987 Classic and the 1987 World Championship all won by Davis.

In the 1987–88 season, Davis won four of the six ranking titles: the 1987 International Open, the 1987 UK Championship, the 1988 Classic and the 1988 World Championship. Hendry won the other two, the 1987 Grand Prix and the 1988 British Open.

The rankings were based on a system of points described in the table below. The ranking order was determined as follows:

- By number of ranking points.
- If there was a tie on points, the player who earned more points in the most recent season was given the higher ranking.
- If there was still a tie, the player with more merit points was given the higher ranking.
- If there was still a tie, the player who earned more merit points in the most recent season was given the higher ranking.
- If there was still a tie, the player who earned more merit points in the season prior to the most recent was given the higher ranking.
- If there was still a tie, the player with more A points was given the higher ranking.
- If there was still a tie, the player with more frames won was given the higher ranking.
- If there was still a tie, the player with the better performance in the previous World Championship was given the higher ranking.
- If there was still a tie, the player with the better performance in the previous ranking tournament was given the higher ranking, going back through ranking events until the positions could be established.

Points tariff contributing to the Snooker world rankings 1988–89
Placing	1987 and 1988 world championships	Other ranking tournaments 1986–87 and 1987–88
Champion	10	6
Runner-up	8	5
Losing semi-finalist	6	4
Losing quarter-finalist	4	3
Last 16 Loser	2	2
Last 32 Loser	1 ranking point or 2 merit points (Note: Players who qualified received a ranking point. Players exempted until this round received two merit points.)	1
Final qualifying round loser	2 merit points	1 merit point
Penultimate qualifying round loser	1 merit point	1 A point
Antepenultimate qualifying round loser	1 A point	Frames won counted
Preliminary round loser	Frames won counted	–

== Rankings ==
Key:

- "(New)" denotes a player that was a new professional for 1987–88.
- "(NT)" denotes a "non-tournament" player, i.e. a player who was permitted to enter the world championship but no other tournaments in 1988–89.
- "(NewNT)" is a player who was a new, non-tournament professional for 1987–88, allowed to play only in the world championship that season.
- "–" denotes that the player did not compete in the tournament.
- "X" denotes that the player was banned from competing in the tournament.

Snooker world rankings 1988–89
Ranking	Name	1986–87 season						1987–88 season						Ranking points	Merit	A points	Frames
Ranking	Name	IO	GP	UK	Cl	BO	WC	IO	GP	UK	Cl	BO	WC	Ranking points	Merit	A points	Frames
1	Steve Davis (ENG)	3	3	6	6	1	10	6	2	6	6	0	10	59	1	0	0
2	Jimmy White (ENG)	0	6	2	5	6	6	2	1	5	2	3	6	44	1	0	0
3	Neal Foulds (ENG)	6	4	5	0	5	6	1	0	0	1	2	4	34	3	0	0
4	Stephen Hendry (SCO)	1	3	0	4	0	4	4	6	0	3	6	2	33	2	1	0
5	Terry Griffiths (WAL)	2	2	2	3	2	4	1	2	3	3	1	8	33	0	0	0
6	Cliff Thorburn (CAN)	5	0	3	1	4	0	5	1	3	1	4	6	31 (Note: Fined two points for failing a drugs test)	3	0	0
7	John Parrott (ENG)	0	1	4	3	0	2	2	4	3	5	4	2	30	2	0	0
8	Tony Knowles (ENG)	2	3	3	0	4	0	2	3	2	4	1	4	28	3	0	0
9	Mike Hallett (ENG)	0	2	2	1	1	4	4	0	3	0	5	2	24	3	0	0
10	Dennis Taylor (NIR)	2	2	1	0	3	2	1	5	1	3	1	2	23	1	0	0
11	Joe Johnson (ENG)	1	0	1	1	2	8	0	1	4	1	2	2	23	2	0	0
12	Silvino Francisco (RSA)	3	4	1	3	1	2	2	1	2	2	1	0	22	2	0	0
13	Willie Thorne (ENG)	0	2	2	0	2	0	1	3	4	1	2	2	19	4	0	0
14	Peter Francisco (RSA)	4	1	1	2	1	0	0	4	1	2	1	1	18	3	0	0
15	John Virgo (ENG)	1	1	1	1	3	1	3	1	1	2	1	1	17	0	0	0
16	Cliff Wilson (WAL)	3	1	0	3	2	0	1	2	1	1	1	1	16	3	0	0
17	Alex Higgins (NIR)	1	2	4	1	0	2	X	X	2	2	0	0	14	4	0	0
18	Rex Williams (ENG)	2	5	0	1	2	0	0	0	0	0	3	0	13	9	0	0
19	Eddie Charlton (AUS)	1	0	1	2	1	0	3	2	0	0	0	2	12	6	0	0
20	Tony Drago (MLT)	1	1	3	0	0	0	0	2	0	1	0	4	12	4	2	0
21	Eugene Hughes (IRL)	4	0	2	0	1	1	3	0	1	0	0	0	12	7	0	0
22	Dean Reynolds (ENG)	3	0	2	4	1	1	0	0	0	1	0	0	12	7	0	0
23	Dene O'Kane (NZL)	1	0	1	0	0	4	0	0	2	0	3	0	11	1	6	0
24	Doug Mountjoy (WAL)	1	2	1	0	2	2	0	0	0	1	0	2	11	5	0	0
25	Steve Newbury (WAL)	0	2	0	0	0	0	1	3	0	4	0	0	10	8	2	0
26	Barry West (ENG)	1	0	0	2	1	1	0	0	1	2	1	1	10	4	0	0
27	John Spencer (ENG)	0	0	2	1	3	0	1	0	0	1	2	0	10	8	0	0
28	David Taylor (ENG)	2	0	1	0	3	1	1	0	1	1	0	0	10	6	0	0
29	Bob Chaperon (CAN)	2	1	0	0	0	0	1	3	0	0	1	1	9	6	0	0
30	Steve Longworth (ENG)	0	0	2	1	0	2	1	0	1	1	0	1	9	5	0	0
31	Tony Meo (ENG)	0	3	1	2	0	0	1	0	1	1	0	0	9	8	0	0
32	Steve James (ENG)	0	0	0	0	1	0	2	0	0	0	1	4	8	2	4	7
33	John Campbell (AUS)	0	1	0	2	0	1	0	0	2	0	1	1	8	6	0	0
34	Wayne Jones (WAL)	0	1	3	2	0	0	1	0	0	0	0	1	8	5	2	0
35	Joe O'Boye (IRL)	0	1	0	0	0	0	3	0	0	0	3	0	7	7	2	0
36	Dave Martin (ENG)	0	1	1	1	1	0	0	0	0	3	0	0	7	9	0	0
37	Kirk Stevens (CAN)	0	0	1	1	2	0	0	1	1	0	–	1	7	6	0	0
38	Jim Wych (CAN)	1	1	1	0	0	1	1	1	1	0	0	0	7	4	1	0
39	David Roe (ENG)	0	0	0	0	0	0	1	1	2	0	2	0	6	3	5	0
40	Ray Reardon (WAL)	1	0	1	0	1	2	0	0	0	0	1	0	6	5	1	0
41	Martin Clark (ENG) (New)	–	–	–	–	–	–	2	1	0	2	0	0	5	2	0	8
42	Tommy Murphy (NIR)	0	0	0	0	2	0	0	0	1	2	0	0	5	8	2	0
43	Danny Fowler (ENG)	0	0	0	2	0	0	0	0	2	0	0	1	5	7	3	0
44	Warren King (AUS)	1	1	0	0	1	1	0	0	0	0	0	1	5	4	3	0
45	Gary Wilkinson (ENG) (New)	–	–	–	–	–	–	0	2	0	0	2	0	4	2	1	9
46	Graham Cripsey (ENG)	0	0	0	0	1	0	0	2	0	0	1	0	4	10	1	0
47	Bill Werbeniuk (CAN)	0	0	0	1	0	0	1	1	0	0	0	1	4	8	1	0
48	Murdo MacLeod (SCO)	0	0	0	0	0	2	0	0	0	0	2	0	4	11	0	0
49	Tony Jones (ENG)	0	0	1	0	1	0	0	0	0	0	2	0	4	7	3	0
50	Steve Duggan (ENG)	1	0	0	2	1	0	0	0	0	0	0	0	4	5	5	0
51	Tony Chappel (WAL)	0	0	0	0	0	0	0	1	2	0	0	0	3	11	1	0
52	Mark Bennett (WAL)	0	1	0	0	0	1	0	0	0	1	0	0	3	6	2	12
53	Ken Owers (ENG)	2	0	0	0	0	0	0	0	0	1	0	0	3	5	4	2
54	Paddy Browne (IRL)	0	2	0	0	0	0	0	0	0	0	1	0	3	2	8	0
55	Ray Edmonds (ENG)	0	0	0	0	0	0	0	1	1	0	0	0	2	5	6	0
56	Nigel Gilbert (ENG)	0	0	0	0	0	0	2	0	0	0	0	0	2	3	5	6
57	Dave Gilbert (ENG)	0	0	0	0	0	0	2	0	0	0	0	0	2	2	7	10
58	Mick Fisher (ENG)	0	0	0	0	0	0	0	2	0	0	0	0	2	1	5	13
59	Pat Houlihan (ENG)	1	0	0	0	0	0	0	1	0	0	0	0	2	1	4	16
60	Roger Bales (ENG)	1	0	0	0	0	0	0	1	0	0	0	0	2	0	10	0
61	Jon Wright (ENG)	0	0	0	1	0	1	0	0	0	0	0	0	2	7	3	2
62	Les Dodd (ENG)	0	1	0	1	0	0	0	0	0	0	0	0	2	5	5	0
63	Marcel Gauvreau (CAN)	2	0	0	0	0	0	0	0	0	0	0	0	2	5	6	0
64	Jack McLaughlin (NIR)	0	1	0	0	1	0	0	0	0	0	0	0	2	5	5	0
65	Graham Miles (ENG)	0	0	0	0	0	0	0	0	1	0	0	0	1	7	4	0
66	Robby Foldvari (AUS)	0	0	0	0	0	0	1	0	0	0	0	0	1	6	6	0
67	Colin Roscoe (WAL)	0	0	0	0	0	0	0	0	0	1	0	0	1	5	4	7
68	Paul Medati (ENG)	0	0	0	0	0	0	0	0	0	0	1	0	1	5	7	0
69	Paul Gibson (ENG)	0	0	0	0	0	0	0	1	0	0	0	0	1	3	6	10
70	Brian Rowswell (ENG)	0	0	0	0	0	0	0	0	0	0	1	0	1	3	7	1
71	Vic Harris (ENG)	0	0	0	0	0	0	0	0	1	0	0	0	1	3	5	10
72	Martin Smith (ENG)	0	0	0	0	0	0	0	0	1	0	0	0	1	2	3	22
73	Jim Chambers (ENG) (New)	–	–	–	–	–	–	0	1	0	0	0	0	1	1	2	5
74	Jim Donnelly (SCO)	0	0	0	0	0	0	0	0	0	1	0	0	1	0	7	15
75	Malcolm Bradley (ENG)	0	0	0	1	0	0	0	0	0	0	0	0	1	7	5	0
76	Mark Wildman (ENG)	0	1	0	0	0	0	0	0	0	0	0	0	1	6	5	0
77	Bob Harris (ENG)	0	0	0	1	0	0	0	0	0	0	0	0	1	6	6	0
78	Geoff Foulds (ENG)	1	0	0	0	0	0	0	0	0	0	0	0	1	3	7	1
79	Robbie Grace (RSA)	0	0	1	0	0	0	0	0	0	0	0	0	1	2	5	13
80	Anthony Kearney (IRL)	0	0	0	1	0	0	0	0	0	0	0	0	1	1	8	10
81	John Rea (SCO)	0	0	0	0	0	0	0	0	0	0	0	0	0	9	2	5
82	Mario Morra (CAN)	0	0	0	0	0	0	0	0	0	0	0	0	0	7	3	10
83	Fred Davis (ENG)	0	0	0	0	0	0	0	0	0	0	0	0	0	6	7	0
84	Bill Oliver (ENG)	0	0	0	0	0	0	0	0	0	0	0	0	0	6	6	7
85	Eddie Sinclair (SCO)	0	0	0	0	0	0	0	0	0	0	0	0	0	6	4	11
86	Jim Bear (CAN)	0	0	0	0	0	0	0	0	0	0	0	0	0	5	4	2
87	Jimmy van Rensberg (RSA)	0	0	0	0	0	0	0	0	0	0	0	0	0	5	6	0
88	Matt Gibson (SCO)	0	0	0	0	0	0	0	0	0	0	0	0	0	5	6	7
89	Ian Williamson (ENG)	0	0	0	0	0	0	0	0	0	0	0	0	0	4	6	4
90	George Scott (ENG)	0	0	0	0	0	0	0	0	0	0	0	0	0	4	8	0
91	Gino Rigitano (CAN)	0	0	0	0	0	0	0	0	0	0	0	0	0	3	6	11
92	John Dunning (ENG)	0	0	0	0	0	0	0	0	0	0	0	0	0	2	5	12
93	Eric Lawlor (ENG) (New)	–	–	–	–	–	–	0	0	0	0	0	0	0	2	1	9
94	Jim Meadowcroft (ENG)	0	0	0	0	0	0	0	0	0	0	0	0	0	2	7	9
95	Glen Wilkinson (AUS)	0	0	0	0	0	0	0	0	0	0	0	0	0	2	5	10
96	Ian Black (SCO)	0	0	0	0	0	0	0	0	0	0	0	0	0	2	6	7
97	Bernie Mikkelsen (CAN)	0	0	0	0	0	0	0	0	0	0	0	0	0	2	5	0
98	Paul Watchorn (IRL)	0	0	0	0	0	0	0	0	0	0	0	0	0	1	6	14
99	Jackie Rea (NIR)	0	0	0	0	0	0	0	0	0	0	0	0	0	1	5	16
100	Mike Darrington (ENG)	0	0	0	0	0	0	0	0	0	0	0	0	0	1	3	24
101	Terry Whitthread (ENG)	0	0	0	0	0	0	0	0	0	0	0	0	0	1	3	19
102	Alain Robidoux (CAN) (NewNT)	–	–	–	–	–	–	–	–	–	–	–	0	0	1	0	0
103	Patsy Fagan (IRL)	0	0	0	0	0	0	0	0	0	0	0	0	0	1	6	10
104	Greg Jenkins (AUS)	0	0	0	0	0	0	0	0	0	0	0	0	0	1	5	13
105	Pascal Burke (IRL)	0	0	0	0	0	0	0	0	0	0	0	0	0	1	4	16
106	Frank Jonik (CAN)	0	0	0	0	0	0	0	0	0	0	0	0	0	1	3	20
107	Ian Anderson (AUS)	0	0	0	0	0	0	0	0	0	0	0	0	0	1	3	4
108	Mike Watterson (ENG)	0	0	0	0	0	0	0	0	0	0	0	0	0	1	0	20
109	Jim Rempe (USA)	0	0	0	0	0	0	0	0	0	0	0	0	0	1	0	4
110	Billy Kelly (IRL)	0	0	0	0	0	0	0	0	0	0	0	0	0	0	7	18
111	Dennis Hughes (ENG)	0	0	0	0	0	0	0	0	0	0	0	0	0	0	5	12
112	Dave Chalmers (ENG)	0	0	0	0	0	0	0	0	0	0	0	0	0	0	5	30
113	François Ellis (RSA)	0	0	0	0	0	0	0	0	0	0	0	0	0	0	4	19
114	Jack Fitzmaurice (ENG)	0	0	0	0	0	0	0	0	0	0	0	0	0	0	4	16
115	Dessie Sheehan (IRL)	0	0	0	0	0	0	0	0	0	0	0	0	0	0	4	35
116	Anthony Harris (ENG) (New)	–	–	–	–	–	–	0	0	0	0	0	0	0	0	3	9
117	Steve Meakin (ENG) (New)	–	–	–	–	–	–	0	0	0	0	0	0	0	0	3	9
118	Jason Smith (ENG) (New)	–	–	–	–	–	–	0	0	0	0	0	0	0	0	2	17
119	Robert Marshall (ENG) (New)	–	–	–	–	–	–	0	0	0	0	0	0	0	0	2	6
120	Clive Everton (WAL) (NT)	0	0	0	0	0	0	0	0	0	0	0	0	0	0	2	14
121	Derek Mienie (RSA) (NT)	0	0	0	0	0	0	0	0	0	0	0	0	0	0	2	19
122	John Hargreaves (ENG) (NT)	0	0	0	0	0	0	0	0	0	0	0	0	0	0	2	14
123	Derek Heaton (ENG) (NT) (New)	–	–	–	–	–	–	0	0	0	0	0	0	0	0	1	13
124	Paul Thornley (CAN) (NT)	0	0	0	0	0	0	0	0	0	0	0	0	0	0	1	13
125	David Greaves (ENG) (NT)	0	0	0	0	0	0	0	0	0	0	0	0	0	0	1	28
126	Mike Hines (RSA) (NT)	0	0	0	0	0	0	0	0	0	0	0	0	0	0	1	6
127	Maurice Parkin (ENG) (NT)	0	0	0	0	0	0	0	0	0	0	0	0	0	0	0	21
128	Bert Demarco (SCO) (NT)	0	0	0	0	0	0	0	0	0	0	0	0	0	0	0	17
129	Bernard Bennett (ENG) (NT)	0	0	0	0	0	0	0	0	0	0	0	0	0	0	0	14
130	Joe Cagianello (CAN) (NT)	0	0	0	0	0	0	0	0	0	0	0	0	0	0	0	7
131	Eddie McLaughlin (SCO) (NT)	0	0	0	0	0	0	0	0	0	0	0	0	0	0	0	1
132	Steve Mizerak (USA) (NT)	0	0	0	0	0	0	0	0	0	0	0	0	0	0	0	0
133	Gerry Watson (CAN) (NT)	0	0	0	0	0	0	0	0	0	0	0	0	0	0	0	0
134	Paddy Morgan (AUS) (NT)	0	0	0	0	0	0	0	0	0	0	0	0	0	0	0	0
135	James Giannaros (AUS) (NT)	0	0	0	0	0	0	0	0	0	0	0	0	0	0	0	0
136	Lou Condo (AUS) (NT)	0	0	0	0	0	0	0	0	0	0	0	0	0	0	0	0
137	Manuel Francisco (RSA) (NT)	0	0	0	0	0	0	0	0	0	0	0	0	0	0	0	0
138	Wayne Sanderson (CAN) (NT)	0	0	0	0	0	0	0	0	0	0	0	0	0	0	0	0

Preceded by 1987–88	1988–89	Succeeded by 1989–90
