= 1988 World Snooker Championship =

Professional snooker tournament

1988 Embassy World Snooker Championship
Tournament information
- Dates: 16 April – 2 May 1988
- Venue: Crucible Theatre
- City: Sheffield
- Country: England
- Organisation: WPBSA
- Format: Ranking event
- Total prize fund: £475,000
- Winner's share: £95,000
- Highest break: Steve James (ENG) (140)

Final
- Champion: Steve Davis (ENG)
- Runner-up: Terry Griffiths (WAL)
- Score: 18–11

The 1988 World Snooker Championship, also known as the 1988 Embassy World Snooker Championship for sponsorship reasons, was a professional snooker tournament that took place from 16 April to 2 May 1988 at the Crucible Theatre in Sheffield, England. Organised by the World Professional Billiards and Snooker Association (WPBSA), it was the sixth and final ranking event of the 1987–88 snooker season and the twelfth consecutive World Snooker Championship to be held at the Crucible, the first tournament there having taken place in 1977.

A five-round qualifying event for the championship was held at the Preston Guild Hall from 22 March to 2 April 1988 for 113 players, 16 of whom reached the main stage, where they met the 16 invited seeded players. The tournament was broadcast in the United Kingdom by the BBC, and was sponsored by the Embassy cigarette company. The winner received £95,000 from the total prize fund of £475,000.

The defending champion was Steve Davis, who had previously won the World Championship four times. He met the 1979 champion Terry Griffiths in the final, which was a best-of-35-frames match. Davis won the match 18–11 after the pair had been level at 8–8 at the end of the first day of the final. Steve James scored the championship's highest break, a 140, in his first-round match. There were 18 century breaks compiled during the championship.

== Overview ==
The World Snooker Championship is an annual professional snooker tournament organised by the World Professional Billiards and Snooker Association (WPBSA). Founded in the late 19th century by British Army soldiers stationed in India, the cue sport gained popularity in the British Isles in the 1920s and 1930s. In the modern era, which started in 1969 when the World Championship reverted to a knockout format, it has become increasingly popular worldwide, especially in East and Southeast Asian nations such as China, Hong Kong and Thailand.

Joe Davis won the first World Championship in 1927, organised by the Billiards Association and Control Council, the final match being held at Camkin's Hall in Birmingham, England. Since 1977, the event has been held at the Crucible Theatre in Sheffield, England. The 1988 championship featured 32 professional players competing in one-on-one snooker matches in a single-elimination format, each match played over several frames. These competitors in the main tournament were selected using a combination of the top players in the snooker world rankings and the winners of a pre-tournament qualification stage that took place at Preston Guild Hall from 22 March to 2 April 1988. The qualifying competition consisted of five knockout rounds, all contested as the best-of-19-frames, including a single preliminary round match. There were 113 players involved in the qualifying competition, which produced 16 players who each faced one of the top 16 players in the world rankings in the first round of the main event. The rounds held at the Crucible Theatre were broadcast in the United Kingdom by the BBC. The 1988 championship was sponsored by cigarette brand Embassy, and was also referred to as the Embassy World Snooker Championship.

=== Prize fund ===
The tournament featured a total prize fund of £475,000, with £95,000 being awarded to the winner. The prize money allocation is shown below. An award of £90,000 would have been made to a player making a maximum break.

==== Main tournament ====
- Winner: £95,000
- Runner-up: £57,000
- Semi-finalists: £28,000
- Quarter-finalists: £14,250
- Last 16: £7,125
- Last 32: £4,007.81
- Highest break: £9,500

==== Qualifying ====
- Fourth qualifying round: £3,117.19
- Third qualifying round: £1,632.81
- Highest break: £2,375

== Tournament summary ==
=== Qualifying ===
Qualifying matches took place at Preston Guild Hall from 22 March to 2 April 1988. The qualifying competition consisted of five knockout rounds, including a single preliminary round match, starting with 113 players, and all qualifying matches were played as best-of-19-frames. American pool player Steve Mizerak made his professional snooker debut in the preliminary round, losing 3–10 to Anthony Harris. On the first day of the qualifying competition, Billy Kelly established a new record highest break for world championship qualifying, compiling a 141 in the sixth frame of his match against Tony Kearney. Kelly won 10–4, concluding with a 76 break in the 14th frame. Alain Robidoux had walkovers against Frank Jonik, who withdrew due to problems with his back, and Robbie Grace, who was unable to travel from South Africa, which meant Robidoux earned a ranking merit point that enabled him to gain full professional status for the following season. He lost 2–10 to Bill Oliver in the third round.

Dene O'Kane, a quarter-finalist in 1987, led 9–8 against Eddie Sinclair but lost 9–10. Oliver eliminated six-time champion Ray Reardon 10–4 before losing 6–10 to Cliff Wilson. It was the first time in his career that Reardon had failed to qualify for the main event. Returning to snooker after a four-month absence during which he had been treated in a Canadian clinic for cocaine addiction, Kirk Stevens defeated Mark Bennett 10–7. Eight-time champion Fred Davis, aged 74, progressed past Jack Fitzmaurice, 10–8, and Jim Bear, 10–4, before losing 3–10 to John Campbell in the last qualifying round. John Spencer, three-times world champion, was eliminated 7–10 by Warren King at the same stage.

Four players, Steve James, Bob Chaperon, Tony Drago and Peter Francisco, qualified for the main event for the first time. James received a walkover against Terry Whitthread in the first round, and eliminated Joe O'Boye, Paddy Browne and Eugene Hughes; Chaperon defeated Robert Marshall, Tommy Murphy and David Taylor; Drago won against Tony Chappel; and Francisco eliminated Robby Foldvari.

=== First round ===
The first round took place between 16 and 21 April, each match played over two sessions as the best of 19 frames. Davis, who had won three of the five ranking events during the season leading up to the world championship, was Coral bookmakers' pre-tournament favourite to win, with odds of 5/4. Stephen Hendry, winner of the other two ranking tournaments, was the second favourite at 4/1. They were followed by Jimmy White at 8/1 and John Parrott at 10/1.

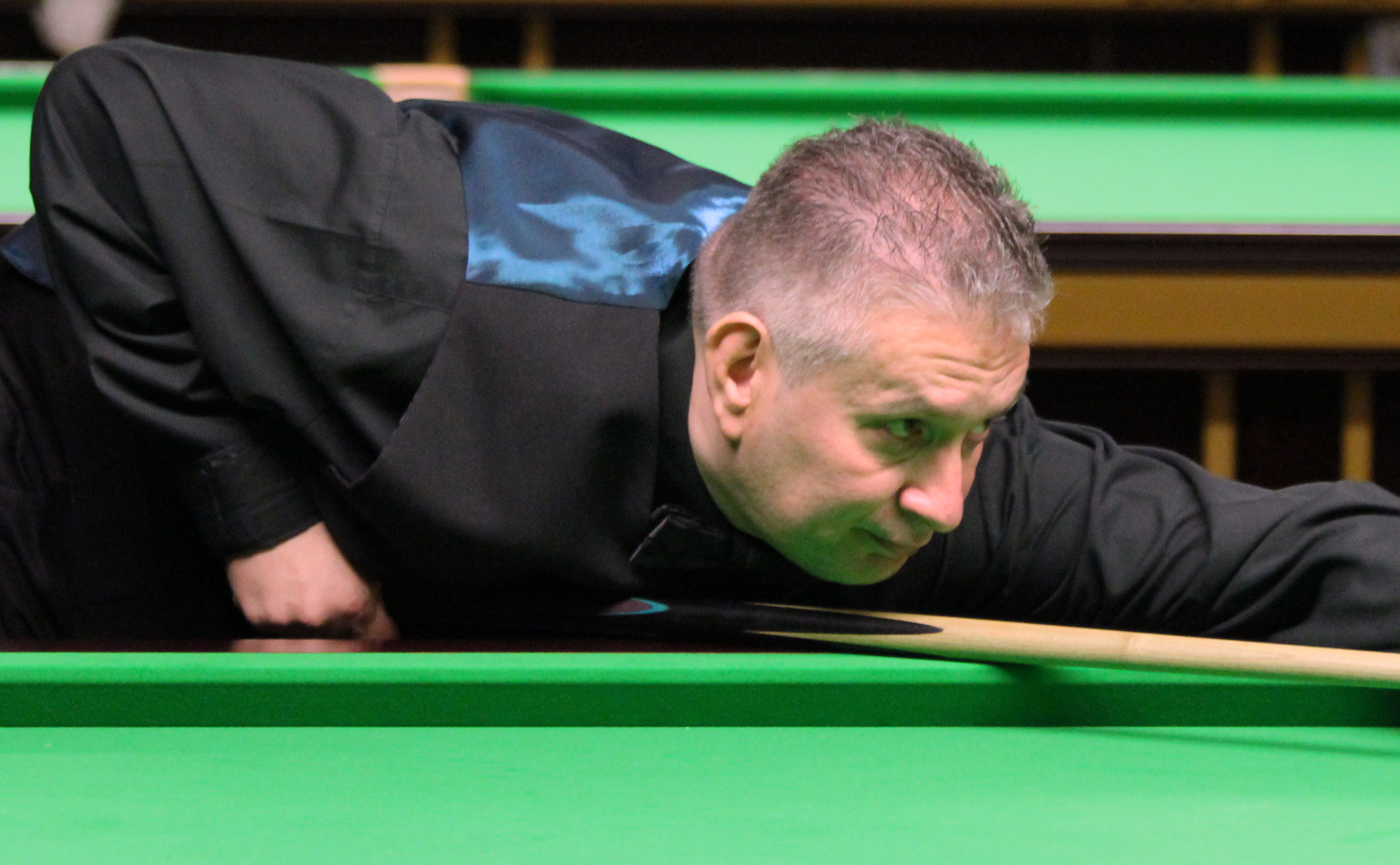
Tony Drago (pictured in 2012) made his World Championship debut.

Davis won a closely contested match against John Virgo, finally prevailing 10–8. Mike Hallett was 8–1 ahead of Chaperon at the end of their first session, and completed a 10–2 victory. Alex Higgins, who won the competition in 1972 and 1982, had been banned (in April 1987) from the first two ranking events of the season, as part of a punishment imposed by the WPBSA for behaviour including headbutting the tournament director at the 1986 UK Championship. He trailed Drago 2–7 after their first session, and after being defeated 2–10, lost his place in the elite top 16 of the snooker world rankings for the first time since rankings were introduced in 1976. (Note: In the ranking list for 1988/1989, Higgins was placed at 17th, two points behind 16th-ranked Cliff Wilson.) The 1985 champion Taylor was 4–5 behind to Bill Werbeniuk as their first session ended. After their second session the following morning was stopped due to over-running as a result of lengthy tactical exchanges and several delays while Werbeniuk visited the toilet during frames, eventually prevailed 10–8 when it was reconvened. This was Werbeniuk's last appearance at the World Snooker Championship finals.

Joe Johnson, champion in 1986 and runner-up in 1987, knocked out Wilson 10–7. Nine days after suffering a serious road traffic accident that wrote off his car, James compiled a break of 140, and another of 104, on his way to defeating Rex Williams 10–6. In the opening frame against King, Parrott produced a break of 80, which turned out to be his only break above 40 as he won 10–4. Cliff Thorburn, the champion in 1980 and the first player to make a maximum break in the championship, in 1983, was only able to compete after his lawyers managed to postpone a disciplinary hearing relating to his failed drug test at the 1988 British Open. He eliminated Stevens, who had undergone voluntary treatment for cocaine addiction and fell from fourth place to outside the top 32 in the rankings during the season. Thorburn won the match 10–6.

From 3–3 against Wayne Jones, Neal Foulds led 6–3 at the end of the first session and progressed by winning 10–7. Doug Mountjoy recorded a 10–6 win against Barry West, and Willie Thorne won by the same score against Peter Francisco. Steve Longworth won only a single frame as he went out 1–10 to the 1979 champion Terry Griffiths.

Tony Knowles eliminated Danny Fowler 10–8. Silvino Francisco made breaks of 91, 109 and 105 against Eddie Charlton in their first session, but still ended it 4–5 behind. Charlton, playing with a cue stick that he had only started using earlier that year, won 10–7. Hendry led Dean Reynolds 6–3 and 7–6, taking the last three frames to progress at 10–6. After winning the first seven frames against Campbell, White achieved a 10–3 victory.

=== Second round ===
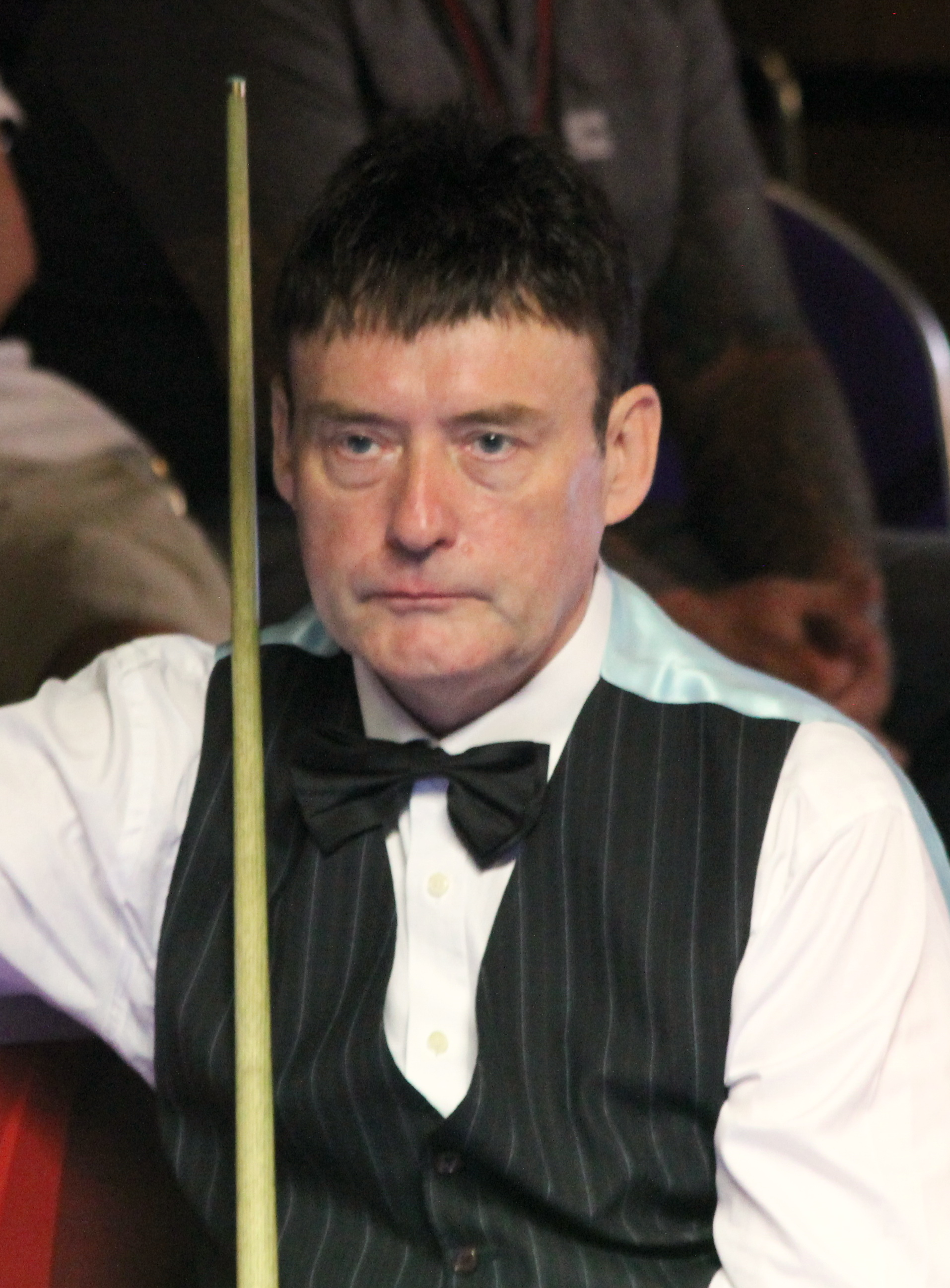
Jimmy White (pictured in 2016) won his second round match against Stephen Hendry 13–12.

The second round, which took place between 21 and 25 April, was played as best-of-25-frames matches spread over three sessions. Davis finished a 13–1 defeat of Hallett with a break of 106. This result matched the heaviest defeat ever recorded in the world snooker championship at the Crucible, Davis's 18–6 victory over Thorburn in the 1983 final. Drago, having defeated a former world champion in the first round, knocked out another in the second round, winning 13–5 against Dennis Taylor. James compiled a break of 112 in the last frame of the first session against Johnson and led 7–1. During the second session, he increased this to 11–3. Johnson won the last two frames of the second session, and the first four frames of the third session, before James took two consecutive frames to qualify 13–9. Thorburn defeated Parrott 13–10, after the pair had been level at 6–6 and 7–7.

Foulds equaled Davis's record for an emphatic victory at the Crucible, and had a break of 102, eliminating Mountjoy 13–1; Mountjoy's failure to progress further meant that he lost his place in the top 16 of the rankings. Griffiths reached the quarter-finals for the fifth year in succession, going from 9–9 to 13–9 against Thorne and concluding with a 101 break in the 22nd frame. Knowles led Charlton 12–4 as they started the third session, and won 13–7.

White finished the first session against Hendry 5–3 ahead, the pair both preferring attempts to pot balls rather than play safety shots. White added the first frame of the second session, before Hendry won six frames in a row, including breaks of 52, 79, 125, 56 and 101, thus led 9–6. White took the final frame of the second session. In the third session, Hendry claimed the first frame to lead 10–7. White replied with breaks of 62, 50, 78 and 71, to take the lead at 11–10. A 108 break from Hendry made it 11–11, but he scored no points in the 23rd frame as White moved ahead again. On a break of 43 in the 24th frame, White miscued, and Hendry won the frame after a break of 48. In the deciding frame, White started a break of 86 by potting a long-range red ball, and prevailed 13–12 in the match. In all, the match featured twenty breaks of 50 or more, including three century breaks. The match was re-shown on BBC Two on 23 April 2020 in a series called Crucible Classics shown in place of the 2020 World Snooker Championship which was postponed because of the coronavirus pandemic. It was the first of seven Crucible matches between White and Hendry over the following decade, including four finals, White losing each encounter until their seventh world championship clash in 1998.

=== Quarter-finals ===
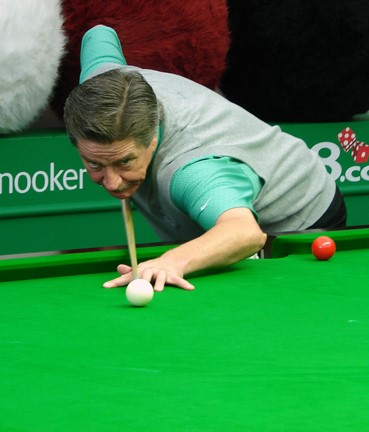
Cliff Thorburn (pictured in 2007) progressed to the semi-finals by defeating qualifier Steve James 13–11.

The quarter-finals were played as best-of-25-frames matches over three sessions on 26 and 27 April. Davis led Drago 3–2, and then won the next four frames scoring a total of 271 points while Drago scored none. Drago took the tenth frame, but from 3–7 was later one frame from defeat at 3–12. In the 16th frame, Davis snookered himself while on a break of 61, and Drago recovered to win that frame. The third session consisted of a single frame, as Davis completed a 13–4 victory. After the eight frames of the first session between Thorburn and James, the score was 4–4. James, who the bookmakers had rated a 500/1 outsider to win the tournament at the start, was still level at 6–6 but lost 11–13. During the match, he compiled a break of 103, his fourth century break of the competition.

Griffiths reached the quarter-finals for the first time since he won the title in 1979 by eliminating Foulds 13–9, having been 1–3 behind. White lost the opening frame but took a 7–1 lead over Knowles in their first session. After extending this lead to 10–2, White later commented "I did the worst thing possible. I started playing to the crowd." Knowles won four consecutive frames, compiling a break of 124 in the process, to trail 6–10. White responded by winning the next three to progress 13–6.

=== Semi-finals ===
The semi-finals took place between 28 and 30 April as best-of-31-frames matches played over four sessions. Thorburn won the first frame against Davis with a clearance of 32, but lost the second on a re-spotted black despite having made a break of 62. Davis took the next three frames, one with a break of 103, and ended the first session 4–3 ahead after Thorburn won the last two frames. During the second session, the players were level at 6–6 before Davis moved into an 8–6 lead, increasing this to 11–6 by taking the first three frames of the third session. Breaks of 77 and 49 in the 18th frame, and a narrow win in the 19th frame, saw Thorburn move to 8–11. Thorburn led by 57 points in the twentieth frame but conceded 4 points by accidentally missing the red balls when playing a safety shot, and Davis compiled a break of 54 to clinch the frame by a single point, finishing the session 14–8 ahead after winning the last two frames. Davis won the first two frames of the fourth session to complete a 16–8 victory.

White won the first two frames against Griffiths, compiling a break of 83 in the second, and made it 3–1 after Griffiths had won the third frame. Griffiths reduced White's advantage to one frame with a fifth frame break of 114. In the next frame, Griffiths missed a red to allow White in and gain the frame. Griffiths won the following two frames and the first session ended level at 4–4. During the second session, White compiled breaks of 44, 77, and 83 while gaining a 7–6 lead. Griffiths replied with breaks of 32, 71, and 61 during the session's last two frames, and took the lead at 8–7. The third session included a 119 break from White in the 17th frame and saw Griffiths increase his lead to 12–10. Griffiths fluked a red in the first frame of the fourth session and went on to compile a winning break of 78. White responded with a 69 break to gain the following frame, making it 13–11 to Griffiths. After potting a re-spotted black to go 14–11 ahead, Griffiths added the following two frames, winning 16–11.

=== Final ===
The final between Davis and Griffiths took place on 1 and 2 May, as a best-of-35-frames match played over four sessions. It was Davis's sixth successive final, and Griffith's first since his win in 1979. Davis had won fifteen of the previous nineteen matches between the pair. Griffiths won the first frame before missing an easy blue ball in the second frame that allowed Davis in to equalise at 1–1. Davis then won the next four frames, Griffiths taking the last frame of the first afternoon session to finish it 2–5 behind. In the second session, Griffiths won the first frame after a break of 34. Davis followed this by taking the next two frames with breaks of 83 and 81 to lead 7–3. Griffiths equalised at 7–7, making breaks of 30, 49, 63 and 55. Davis took the lead back with a break of 66 in the 15th frame, but a fluke on a red by Griffiths and a later miss on a red by Davis contributed to Griffiths equalising at 8–8 at the session's end. Griffiths suggested that getting back to 8‍–‍8 after the second session was like winning the football pools.

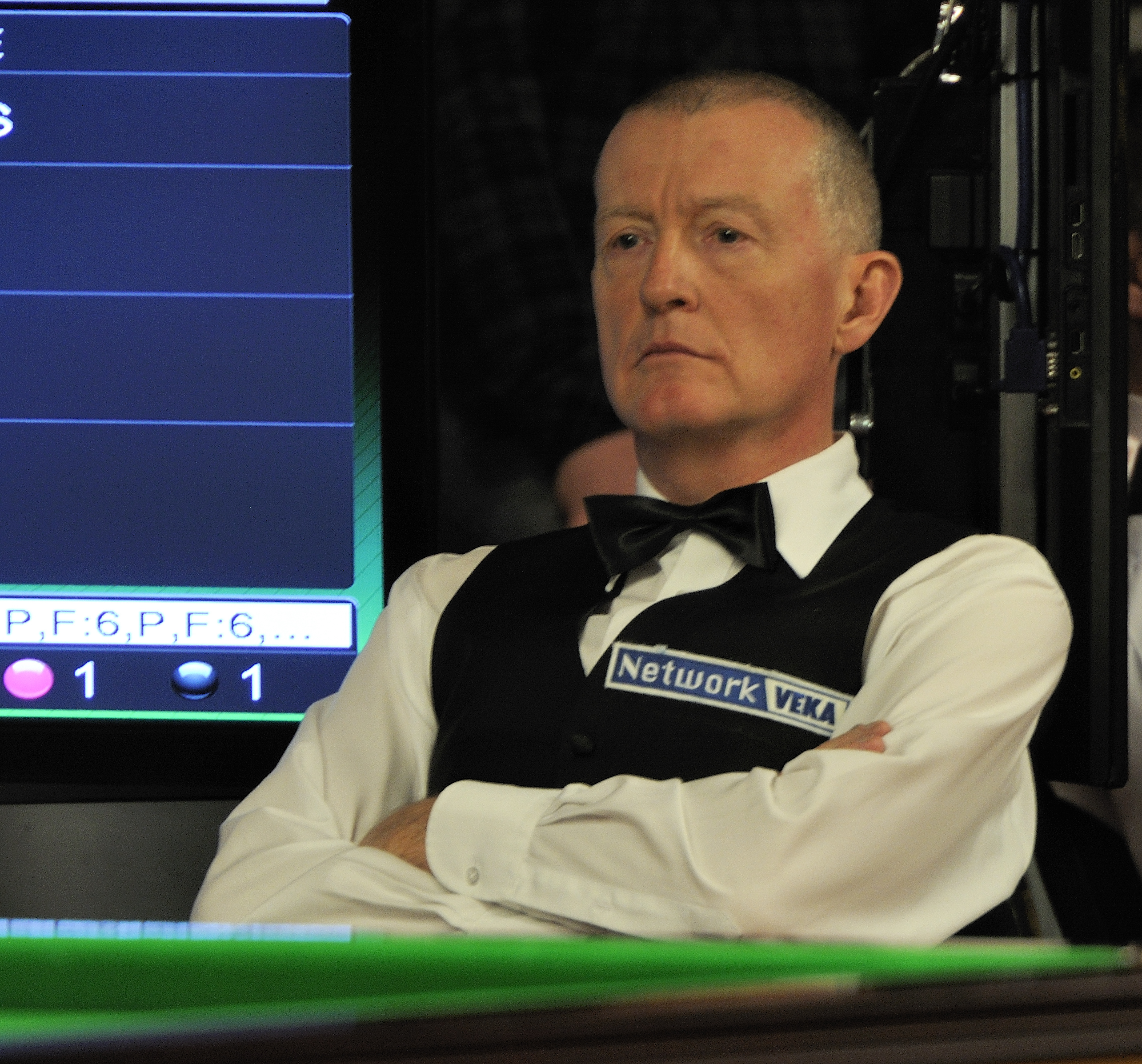
Steve Davis (pictured in 2014) won his fifth world title.

Davis missed some easy pots at the start of the third session, but still won the first three frames to lead 11–8 as Griffiths made several errors. Griffiths took the 20th frame with a break of 46, but Davis restored a three-frame advantage with breaks of 33 and 36 in the 21st frame. In the 22nd frame, Griffiths laid a snooker and obtained the penalty points from Davis that he would have required to win the frame, but then missed in an attempt to pot the black ball and lost the frame as Davis moved to a 13–9 lead. A break of 57 by Griffiths won him a frame to reduce Davis's lead to 13–10, and he led 41–0 in the next frame before Davis compiled a 92 break to lead 14–10 at the end of the session.

In the fourth session, Davis won the opening frame after making a break of 46, and then won two of the next three frames with breaks of 118 and 123. In the 29th frame, Griffiths missed a black from its spot, and Davis went on to win the frame with a break of 66 and take the title, achieving victory at 18–11.

Clive Everton, who played in the qualifying rounds of the tournament, wrote in The Guardian that, despite Griffiths equalising at 7–7 by winning four consecutive frames, "it was not a vintage final." The Benson and Hedges Snooker Year report of the championship concluded that "The final was never a classic but merely emphasized Davis's superiority and grip on the world of professional snooker." Griffiths, who was the oldest world snooker championship finalist since Reardon in 1982, said "My long potting got me to the final. But in the end it let me down. Steve's safety is so good that you have to make the long potting count and I didn't which was the most disappointing part of my performance in the final." This was Davis's fifth world championship win, leaving him one behind Reardon's record total of six titles in the modern era. Davis commented "You are always delighted to win a world championship, and I'm not thinking about records. All I know is I keep coming back to the World Championship, which is two and a half weeks of agony and turmoil and trauma."

It was Davis's fourth win in six ranking tournaments in the 1987–88 snooker season, a period in which he also won the 1988 Masters and the 1988 Irish Masters, and he became first player to win all of the snooker "Triple Crown" events in a single season. His prize money earnings for the season were £425,000, and he retained his top position in the end-of-year rankings with 59 points, ahead of White in second on 44 points. Griffiths, with 33 points, was fifth, one place higher than in the previous ranking list.

== Main draw ==
Shown below are the results for each round. The numbers in brackets denote player seedings; match winners are denoted in bold.

**First round** Best of 19 frames
16 April
**Steve Davis (ENG) (1)**	**10**
John Virgo (ENG)	8
16 & 17 April
**Mike Hallett (ENG) (16)**	**10**
Bob Chaperon (CAN)	2
17 & 18 April
Alex Higgins (NIR) (9)	2
**Tony Drago (MLT)**	**10**
17 & 18 April
**Dennis Taylor (NIR) (8)**	**10**
Bill Werbeniuk (CAN)	8
18 & 19 April
**Joe Johnson (ENG) (5)**	**10**
Cliff Wilson (WAL)	7
19 & 20 April
Rex Williams (ENG) (12)	6
**Steve James (ENG)**	**10**
19 & 20 April
**John Parrott (ENG) (13)**	**10**
Warren King (AUS)	4
20 & 21 April
**Cliff Thorburn (CAN) (4)**	**10**
Kirk Stevens (CAN)	6
20 & 21 April
**Neal Foulds (ENG) (3)**	**10**
Wayne Jones (WAL)	7
20 April
**Doug Mountjoy (WAL) (14)**	**10**
Barry West (ENG)	6
19 April
**Willie Thorne (ENG) (11)**	**10**
Peter Francisco (RSA)	6
18 & 19 April
**Terry Griffiths (WAL) (6)**	**10**
Steve Longworth (ENG)	1
17 & 18 April
**Tony Knowles (ENG) (7)**	**10**
Danny Fowler (ENG)	8
17 & 18 April
Silvino Francisco (RSA) (10)	7
**Eddie Charlton (AUS)**	**10**
16 & 17 April
Dean Reynolds (ENG) (15)	6
**Stephen Hendry (SCO)**	**10**
16 April
**Jimmy White (ENG) (2)**	**10**
John Campbell (AUS)	3

**Second round** Best of 25 frames
21 & 22 April
(England) **Steve Davis (1)**	**13**
(England) Mike Hallett (16)	1
22 & 23 April
(Malta) **Tony Drago**	**13**
(Northern Ireland) Dennis Taylor (8)	5
23, 24 & 25 April
(England) Joe Johnson (5)	9
(England) **Steve James**	**13**
24 & 25 April
(England) John Parrott (13)	10
(Canada) **Cliff Thorburn (4)**	**13**
24 & 25 April
(England) **Neal Foulds (3)**	**13**
(Wales) Doug Mountjoy (14)	1
23, 24 & 25 April
(England) Willie Thorne (11)	9
(Wales) **Terry Griffiths (6)**	**13**
22 & 23 April
(England) **Tony Knowles (7)**	**13**
(Australia) Eddie Charlton	7
21, 22 & 23 April
(Scotland) Stephen Hendry	12
(England) **Jimmy White (2)**	**13**

**Quarter-finals**; Best of 25 frames
26 & 27 April
(England) **Steve Davis (1)**	**13**
(Malta) Tony Drago	4
26 & 27 April
(England) Steve James	11
(Canada) **Cliff Thorburn (4)**	**13**
26 & 27 April
(England) Neal Foulds (3)	9
(Wales) **Terry Griffiths (6)**	**13**
26 & 27 April
(England) Tony Knowles (7)	6
(England) **Jimmy White (2)**	**13**

**Semi-finals**; Best of 31 frames
28, 29 & 30 April
(England) **Steve Davis (1)**	**16**
(Canada) Cliff Thorburn (4)	8
28, 29 & 30 April
(Wales) **Terry Griffiths (6)**	**16**
(England) Jimmy White (2)	11

**Final**; Best of 35 frames
1 & 2 May
(England) **Steve Davis (1)**	**18**
(Wales) Terry Griffiths (6)	11

Final: (Best of 35 frames) Crucible Theatre, Sheffield, 1 & 2 May 1988. Referee: John Williams.
**Steve Davis (1)** England				**18**–11			**Terry Griffiths (6)** Wales			
Session 1: 5–2
Frame	1	2	3	4	5	6	7	8	9	10
Davis	46	**53**^{†}	**64**^{†}	**76**^{†}	**80**^{†}	**78**^{†} (61)	1	N/A	N/A	N/A
Griffiths	**71**^{†}	52	21	25	22	0	**86**^{†} (50)	N/A	N/A	N/A
Session 2: 8–8
Frame	1	2	3	4	5	6	7	8	9	10
Davis	56	**83**^{†} (83)	**81**^{†} (81)	22	9	60 (59)	61	**67**^{†} (66)	8	N/A
Griffiths	**60**^{†}	6	0	**79**^{†}	**82**^{†} (63)	**63**^{†} (55)	**70**^{†} (57)	9	**111**^{†} (65)	N/A
Session 3: 14–10
Frame	1	2	3	4	5	6	7	8	9	10
Davis	**60**^{†}	**56**^{†}	**74**^{†}	10	**70**^{†}	**79**^{†}	9	**92**^{†} (92)	N/A	N/A
Griffiths	53	33	8	**68**^{†}	9	31	**78**^{†} (57)	41	N/A	N/A
Session 4: **18**–11
Frame	1	2	3	4	5	6	7	8	9	10
Davis	**70**^{†}	**118**^{†} (118)	28	**123**^{†} (123)	**66**^{†} (66)	N/A	N/A	N/A	N/A	N/A
Griffiths	46	4	**87**^{†}	1	35	N/A	N/A	N/A	N/A	N/A
123				Highest break			65			
2				Century breaks			0			
7				50+ breaks			6			
Numbers in parentheses denote breaks of 50 or more in the frame. † = Winner of frame

== Qualifying ==
A preliminary round match, and four rounds of qualification for the main draw, were played at the Guild Hall in Preston, England from 22 March to 2 April 1988. Match winners are denoted in bold.

**Preliminary round** Best of 19 frames
Player	Score	Player
**Anthony Harris (ENG)**	**10**–3	Steve Mizerak (USA)

**First qualifying round** Best of 19 frames
**Paul Gibson (ENG)**	**10**
Dessie Sheehan (IRL)	9
Mick Fisher (ENG)	4
**Anthony Harris (ENG)**	**10**
**Colin Roscoe (WAL)**	**10**
Eddie McLaughlin (SCO)	1
**Robert Marshall (ENG)**	w.o.
Greg Jenkins (AUS)	w.d.
**Graham Miles (ENG)**	**10**
Dennis Hughes (ENG)	3
**Nigel Gilbert (ENG)**	**10**
John Rea (SCO)	5
**Ian Williamson (ENG)**	w.o.
Joe Cagianello (CAN)	w.d.
**Brian Rowswell (ENG)**	**10**
Paul Thornley (CAN)	7
**Bill Oliver (ENG)**	**10**
Dave Chalmers (ENG)	9
**Alain Robidoux (CAN)**	w.o.
Frank Jonik (CAN)	w.d.
**Billy Kelly (IRL)**	**10**
Tony Kearney (IRL)	4
**Steve James (ENG)**	w.o.
Terry Whitthread (ENG)	w.d.
**Paul Watchorn (IRL)**	**10**
Matt Gibson (SCO)	7
**Martin Clark (ENG)**	**10**
Mike Darrington (ENG)	5
**Gino Rigitano (CAN)**	**10**
John Dunning (ENG)	7
**Jason Smith (ENG)**	**10**
Jim Donnelly (SCO)	4
**Glen Wilkinson (AUS)**	**10**
Clive Everton (WAL)	2
**Mario Morra (CAN)**	**10**
Steve Meakin (ENG)	5
**Martin Smith (ENG)**	**10**
Vic Harris (ENG)	6
**Eric Lawlor (ENG)**	w.o.
Jimmy van Rensberg (RSA)	w.d.
**Bernie Mikkelsen (CAN)**	**10**
Jackie Rea (NIR)	3
**Robby Foldvari (AUS)**	**10**
Jim Rempe (USA)	4
**Jim Meadowcroft (ENG)**	**10**
Bernard Bennett (ENG)	5
**Dave Gilbert (ENG)**	**10**
Derek Heaton (ENG)	2
**Paul Medati (ENG)**	**10**
Gary Wilkinson (ENG)	9
**Ian Black (SCO)**	w.o.
John Hargreaves (ENG)	w.d.
**Patsy Fagan (IRL)**	**10**
David Greaves (ENG)	3
**Eddie Sinclair (SCO)**	**10**
Pascal Burke (IRL)	2
**David Roe (ENG)**	**10**
Bert Demarco (SCO)	2
**Jim Chambers (ENG)**	**10**
Mike Watterson (ENG)	3
**Jim Bear (CAN)**	**10**
Derek Mienie (RSA)	4
**Jack Fitzmaurice (ENG)**	**10**
Maurice Parkin (ENG)	6

**Second qualifying round** Best of 19 frames
Marcel Gauvreau (CAN)	9
**Paul Gibson (ENG)**	**10**
**Steve Duggan (ENG)**	**10**
Anthony Harris (ENG)	4
**Tommy Murphy (NIR)**	**10**
Colin Roscoe (WAL)	8
**Bob Chaperon (CAN)**	**10**
Robert Marshall (ENG)	3
Roger Bales (ENG)	7
**Graham Miles (ENG)**	**10**
**Tony Chappel (WAL)**	**10**
Nigel Gilbert (ENG)	8
**Malcolm Bradley (ENG)**	**10**
Ian Williamson (ENG)	9
**Bill Werbeniuk (CAN)**	**10**
Brian Rowswell (ENG)	6
Ray Reardon (WAL)	6
**Bill Oliver (ENG)**	**10**
Robbie Grace (RSA)	w.d.
**Alain Robidoux (CAN)**	w.o.
**Paddy Browne (IRL)**	**10**
Billy Kelly (IRL)	8
Joe O'Boye (ENG)	7
**Steve James (ENG)**	**10**
**Warren King (AUS)**	**10**
Paul Watchorn (IRL)	4
George Scott (ENG)	4
**Martin Clark (ENG)**	**10**
**Mark Bennett (WAL)**	**10**
Gino Rigitano (CAN)	4
**Jim Wych (CAN)**	**10**
Jason Smith (ENG)	3
**Wayne Jones (WAL)**	**10**
Glen Wilkinson (AUS)	4
Ray Edmonds (ENG)	8
**Mario Morra (CAN)**	**10**
Jack McLaughlin (NIR)	3
**Martin Smith (ENG)**	**10**
**Steve Newbury (WAL)**	**10**
Eric Lawlor (ENG)	3
**Mark Wildman (ENG)**	**10**
Bernie Mikkelsen (CAN)	5
Tony Jones (ENG)	9
**Robby Foldvari (AUS)**	**10**
**Graham Cripsey (ENG)**	**10**
Jim Meadowcroft (ENG)	3
**Pat Houlihan (ENG)**	w.o.
Dave Gilbert (ENG)	w.d.
**Les Dodd (ENG)**	**10**
Paul Medati (ENG)	6
**Danny Fowler (ENG)**	**10**
Ian Black (SCO)	1
**Bob Harris (ENG)**	**10**
Patsy Fagan (IRL)	1
Dene O'Kane (NZL)	9
**Eddie Sinclair (SCO)**	**10**
**Ken Owers (ENG)**	**10**
David Roe (ENG)	7
**Jon Wright (ENG)**	**10**
Jim Chambers (ENG)	2
Geoff Foulds (ENG)	2
**Jim Bear (CAN)**	**10**
**Fred Davis (ENG)**	**10**
Jack Fitzmaurice (ENG)	8

**Third qualifying round** Best of 19 frames
Paul Gibson (ENG)	9
**Steve Duggan (ENG)**	**10**
Tommy Murphy (NIR)	5
**Bob Chaperon (CAN)**	**10**
Graham Miles (ENG)	7
**Tony Chappel (WAL)**	**10**
Malcolm Bradley (ENG)	8
**Bill Werbeniuk (CAN)**	**10**
**Bill Oliver (ENG)**	**10**
Alain Robidoux (CAN)	2
Paddy Browne (IRL)	1
**Steve James (ENG)**	**10**
**Warren King (AUS)**	**10**
Martin Clark (ENG)	9
**Mark Bennett (WAL)**	**10**
Jim Wych (CAN)	5
**Wayne Jones (WAL)**	**10**
Mario Morra (CAN)	8
Martin Smith (ENG)	9
**Steve Newbury (WAL)**	**10**
Mark Wildman (ENG)	1
**Robby Foldvari (AUS)**	**10**
**Graham Cripsey (ENG)**	**10**
Pat Houlihan (ENG)	4
Les Dodd (ENG)	8
**Danny Fowler (ENG)**	**10**
**Bob Harris (ENG)**	**10**
Eddie Sinclair (SCO)	0
Ken Owers (ENG)	8
**Jon Wright (ENG)**	**10**
Jim Bear (CAN)	4
**Fred Davis (ENG)**	**10**

**Fourth qualifying round** Best of 19 frames
**John Virgo (ENG)**	**10**
Steve Duggan (ENG)	5
David Taylor (ENG)	6
**Bob Chaperon (CAN)**	**10**
**Tony Drago (MLT)**	10
Tony Chappel (WAL)	7
Tony Meo (ENG)	4
**Bill Werbeniuk (CAN)**	**10**
**Cliff Wilson (WAL)**	**10**
Bill Oliver (ENG)	6
Eugene Hughes (IRL)	6
**Steve James (ENG)**	**10**
John Spencer (ENG)	7
**Warren King (AUS)**	**10**
**Kirk Stevens (CAN)**	**10**
Mark Bennett (WAL)	7
Dave Martin (ENG)	5
**Wayne Jones (WAL)**	**10**
**Barry West (ENG)**	**10**
Steve Newbury (WAL)	8
**Peter Francisco (RSA)**	**10**
Robby Foldvari (AUS)	5
**Steve Longworth (ENG)**	**10**
Graham Cripsey (ENG)	2
Murdo MacLeod (SCO)	3
**Danny Fowler (ENG)**	**10**
**Eddie Charlton (AUS)**	**10**
Bob Harris (ENG)	4
**Stephen Hendry (SCO)**	**10**
Jon Wright (ENG)	4
**John Campbell (AUS)**	**10**
Fred Davis (ENG)	3

== Century breaks ==
There were 18 century breaks in the championship, the highest being 140 compiled by Steve James. James's performance at the championship earned him the WPBSA's Most Memorable Performance of the Year award, and he shared the Association's Highest Televised Break of the Year award with Steve Davis, who had compiled a break of 140 at the 1987 International Open.

- 140, 112, 104, 103 – Steve James
- 125, 108, 101 – Stephen Hendry
- 124 – Tony Knowles
- 123, 118, 106, 104 – Steve Davis
- 119 – Jimmy White
- 114, 101 – Terry Griffiths
- 109, 105 – Silvino Francisco
- 102 – Neal Foulds

=== Qualifying stages ===
There were 20 century breaks in the qualifying stages, the highest of which was 141 compiled by Billy Kelly.

- 141 – Billy Kelly
- 132 – Steve James
- 131 – Wayne Jones
- 125 – Barry West
- 120, 109 – Bill Werbeniuk
- 113 – David Roe
- 112, 104 – Matt Gibson
- 110, 100 – David Taylor
- 108 – Peter Francisco
- 105 – Patsy Fagan
- 104 – John Spencer
- 104, 102 – Dene O'Kane
- 102 – Gary Wilkinson
- 100 – Tony Chappel
- 100 – Tommy Murphy
- 100 – Robby Foldvari
