= 1989 Dubai Classic =

Dubai Classic
Tournament information
- Dates: 27 October – 3 November 1989
- Venue: Al Nasr Stadium
- City: Dubai
- Country: United Arab Emirates
- Organisation: WPBSA
- Format: Ranking event
- Total prize fund: £200,000
- Winner's share: £40,000
- Highest break: Stephen Hendry (SCO) (105)

Final
- Champion: Stephen Hendry (SCO)
- Runner-up: Doug Mountjoy (WAL)
- Score: 9–2

The 1989 Dubai Duty Free Classic was a professional ranking snooker tournament that took place from 27 October to 3 November 1989 at the Al Nasr Stadium in Dubai, United Arab Emirates.

Stephen Hendry won the tournament, defeating Doug Mountjoy 9–2 in the final. Hendry won £40,000 in prize money while Mountjoy received £22,500 as runner-up.

== Main draw ==
Last 64; Best of 9 frames
(Scotland) Stephen Hendry	5
(Scotland) Murdo MacLeod	3
(Canada) Jim Wych	5
(England) Nick Terry	2
(Malta) Tony Drago	5
(England) Bob Marshall	0
(Wales) Cliff Wilson	5
(England) Brian Morgan	3
(England) Dean Reynolds	5
(England) Dave Martin	2
(England) John Spencer	5
(England) Bob Harris	3
(England) Barry West	5
(Wales) Darren Morgan	1
(Wales) Wayne Jones	5
(England) George Scott	3
(England) Danny Fowler	5
(Republic of Ireland) Paddy Browne	4
(England) Tony Jones	5
(England) Mike Hallett	4
(England) Martin Clark	5
(Canada) Marcel Gauvreau	1
(England) Brian Rowswell	5
(Scotland) John Rea	4
(England) Steve Longworth	1
(Northern Ireland) Jack McLaughlin	5
(Republic of Ireland) Steve Newbury	1
(Australia) John Campbell	5
(England) John Virgo	5
(South Africa) Jimmy van Rensberg	4
(Wales) Tony Chappel	5
(England) Rex Williams	2
(Wales) Doug Mountjoy	5
(England) Graham Miles	2
(Australia) Warren King	5
(England) David Taylor	2
(England) David Roe	5
(England) Roger Bales	3
(Australia) Eddie Charlton	5
(England) Eric Lawlor	3
(Northern Ireland) Alex Higgins	5
(Scotland) Eddie Sinclair	2
(New Zealand) Dene O'Kane	5
(Wales) Mark Bennett	2
(Malta) Joe Grech	5
(England) Tony Knowles	3
(England) Gary Wilkinson	5
(England) Les Dodd	3
(England) John Parrott	5
(England) Paul Gibson	2
(Thailand) James Wattana	5
(Republic of Ireland) Eugene Hughes	0
(England) Steve James	5
(England) Jon Wright	2
(England) Jim Chambers	5
(Northern Ireland) Joe O'Boye	4
(South Africa) Peter Francisco	5
(England) Mick Fisher	0
(England) Paul Medati	5
(South Africa) Silvino Francisco	4
(England) Nigel Bond	5
(England) Joe Johnson	3
(Canada) Alain Robidoux	5
(Canada) Mario Morra	1

Last 32; Best of 9 frames
(Scotland) Stephen Hendry	w/o
(Canada) Jim Wych	w/d
(Malta) Tony Drago	5
(Wales) Cliff Wilson	0
(England) Dean Reynolds	5
(England) John Spencer	4
(England) Barry West	5
(Wales) Wayne Jones	2
(England) Danny Fowler	5
(England) Tony Jones	4
(England) Martin Clark	5
(England) Brian Rowswell	4
(Northern Ireland) Jack McLaughlin	5
(Australia) John Campbell	1
(England) John Virgo	5
(Wales) Tony Chappel	4
(Wales) Doug Mountjoy	5
(Australia) Warren King	2
(England) David Roe	5
(Australia) Eddie Charlton	3
(Northern Ireland) Alex Higgins	5
(New Zealand) Dene O'Kane	3
(Malta) Joe Grech	5
(England) Gary Wilkinson	2
(England) John Parrott	5
(Thailand) James Wattana	3
(England) Steve James	5
(England) Jim Chambers	4
(South Africa) Peter Francisco	5
(England) Paul Medati	1
(England) Nigel Bond	5
(Canada) Alain Robidoux	4

Last 16; Best of 9 frames
(Scotland) Stephen Hendry	5
(Malta) Tony Drago	3
(England) Dean Reynolds	5
(England) Barry West	2
(England) Danny Fowler	5
(England) Martin Clark	2
(Northern Ireland) Jack McLaughlin	5
(England) John Virgo	4
(Wales) Doug Mountjoy	5
(England) David Roe	4
(Northern Ireland) Alex Higgins	5
(Malta) Joe Grech	4
(England) John Parrott	5
(England) Steve James	3
(South Africa) Peter Francisco	5
(England) Nigel Bond	4

Quarter-finals; Best of 9 frames
(Scotland) Stephen Hendry	5
(England) Dean Reynolds	3
(England) Danny Fowler	5
(Northern Ireland) Jack McLaughlin	1
(Wales) Doug Mountjoy	5
(Northern Ireland) Alex Higgins	2
(England) John Parrott	5
(South Africa) Peter Francisco	1

Semi-finals; Best of 9 frames
(Scotland) Stephen Hendry	5
(England) Danny Fowler	4
(Wales) Doug Mountjoy	5
(England) John Parrott	4

Final; Best of 17 frames
(Scotland) Stephen Hendry	9
(Wales) Doug Mountjoy	2
