= South African Confederation of Cue Sport =

- Sport: Cue sport
- Abbreviation: SACCS
- Founded: 2006
- Headquarters: Johannesburg
- Location: 90 Main Road, Bluehills, Kyalami, Johannesburg
- President: Anand Naidoo
- Secretary: Jo-Anne Reynolds

Official website
- www.sacuesport.co.za
- (South Africa)

The South African Confederation of Cue Sport (SACCS) is the governing body of cue sports in South Africa. SACCS is responsible for the promotion and development of the combination of pool, carom and snooker, and is affiliated to SASCOC.

SACCS aims to reverse cue sport’s reputation in South Africa from being a more recreational one to a full-fledged sport with its Long Term Participant Development (LTPD) plan, by attracting new participants, starting with the identification of talent and exposing these new talents to a high quality of coaching and competitive tournaments.

== Affiliate members ==
This is a list of affiliated members of SACCS according to its constitution.

- Pool South Africa (PSA)
- South African Blackball Federation (SABF)
- Snooker and Billiards South Africa (SABSA)
- Pool 4 Change (P4C) - Development

== See also ==
- Sport in South Africa
- South African Amateur Championship (snooker)
- Glossary of cue sports terms
