= 1979 Limosin International =

Limosin International
Tournament information
- Dates: 9–20 July 1979
- Venue: Good Hope Centre
- City: Cape Town
- Country: South Africa
- Organisation: WPBSA
- Format: Non-Ranking event
- Winner's share: R5,000

Final
- Champion: (Australia) Eddie Charlton
- Runner-up: (England) John Spencer
- Score: 23–19

The 1979 Limosin International was a non-ranking invitational snooker tournament which took place from 9 to 20 July 1979. The tournament was played at the Good Hope Centre in Cape Town, and featured six professional players alongside two South African amateurs, Mannie Francisco and his brother Silvino.

Eddie Charlton won the title, beating John Spencer 23–19 in the final. Charlton received R5,000 prize money as the champion.

== Main draw ==
Results for the tournament are shown below.

| Quarter-finals; Best of 15 frames | | Semi-finals; Best of 31 frames | | Final; Best of 45 frames |
| (England) John Spencer | 8 |
| (England) Graham Miles | 2 | (England) John Spencer | 16 |
| (South Africa) Silvino Francisco | 8 | (South Africa) Silvino Francisco | 12 |
| (South Africa) Perrie Mans | 4 | | | (England) John Spencer | 19 |
| (Australia) Eddie Charlton | 8 | | | (Australia) Eddie Charlton | 23 |
| (South Africa) Mannie Francisco | 3 | (Australia) Eddie Charlton | 16 |
| (England) Rex Williams | 7 | (Canada) Cliff Thorburn | 10 |
| (Canada) Cliff Thorburn | 8 |
