= 1992 Grand Prix (snooker) =

Snooker tournament

1992 Rothmans Grand Prix

Tournament information
- Dates: 12–25 October 1992
- Venue: Hexagon Theatre
- City: Reading
- Country: England
- Organisation: WPBSA
- Format: Ranking event
- Total prize fund: £424,700
- Winner's share: £80,000
- Highest break: Joe Swail (NIR) (140)

Final
- Champion: Jimmy White (ENG)
- Runner-up: Ken Doherty (IRL)
- Score: 10–9

The 1992 Rothmans Grand Prix was a professional snooker tournament and the second of nine WPBSA ranking events in the 1992/1993 season, preceding the UK Championship. It was held from 12 to 25 October 1992 at the Hexagon Theatre in Reading, England. The event was the eleventh edition of the Grand Prix, first held in 1982 as the 1982 Professional Players Tournament.

Stephen Hendry was the defending champion, but he lost his last 64 match against Tony Chappel. Jimmy White played Ken Doherty in the final, with the latter contesting his first ranking event final. White defeated Doherty 10–9 in the final to win his eighth ranking title.

Fred Davis, at the age of 79, lost 5–1 in the qualifying rounds to 17-year-old Ronnie O'Sullivan. Also in the qualifiers, O'Sullivan defeated Jason Curtis 5–0 in 43 minutes 36 seconds, the fastest best-of-nine-frames match to date. The event featured a prize of £80,000 for the winner of the event.

== Tournament summary ==
Defending and World Champion Stephen Hendry was the number 1 seed. The remaining places were allocated to players based on the world rankings.

== Main draw ==
Below is the main draw for the event. Players in bold denote match winners.

Last 64; Best of 9 frames
1	(Scotland) Stephen Hendry	3
(Wales) **Tony Chappel**	**5**
20	(England) Tony Knowles	3
(Republic of Ireland) **Eugene Hughes**	**5**
27	(Wales) **Mark Bennett**	**5**
(Northern Ireland) Jason Prince	4
12	(England) **Martin Clark**	**5**
(England) Paul Gibson	1
11	(Northern Ireland) **Dennis Taylor**	**5**
(Northern Ireland) Dermot McGlinchey	1
30	(England) Danny Fowler	4
53	(Northern Ireland) **Joe Swail**	**5**
17	(England) **Mike Hallett**	**5**
(England) Rod Lawler	2
6	(Wales) **Terry Griffiths**	**5**
(England) Les Dodd	3
7	(Thailand) **James Wattana**	**5**
(England) Mick Price	3
28	(South Africa) Silvino Francisco	4
(Scotland) **Billy Snaddon**	**5**
21	(Republic of Ireland) **Ken Doherty**	**5**
(Wales) Steve Newbury	3
15	(England) **Willie Thorne**	**5**
(England) Mark Rowing	3
16	(Wales) **Darren Morgan**	**5**
(England) Brian Rowswell	2
25	(South Africa) Peter Francisco	2
47	(England) **Peter Ebdon**	**5**
32	(England) **David Roe**	**5**
(Wales) Anthony Davies	2
4	(England) **Steve Davis**	**5**
(England) Dave Harold	0
3	(England) **Jimmy White**	**5**
(Canada) Jim Wych	2
29	(Australia) Eddie Charlton	4
(Wales) **Cliff Wilson**	**5**
31	(England) **Mark Johnston-Allen**	**5**
(England) Jason Ferguson	2
14	(Canada) **Alain Robidoux**	**5**
(England) Nigel Gilbert	1
10	(England) **Steve James**	**5**
(England) Sean Lanigan	2
23	(England) **Joe Johnson**	**5**
(England) Mark Boyd	2
24	(Malta) Tony Drago	1
(England) **Nick Terry**	**5**
5	(England) **Neal Foulds**	**5**
(England) Nick Fruin	1
8	(England) **Gary Wilkinson**	**5**
(England) Ronnie O'Sullivan	3
18	(New Zealand) Dene O'Kane	2
(Scotland) **John Higgins**	**5**
26	(Wales) Doug Mountjoy	3
(England) **Bill Oliver**	**5**
9	(England) **Nigel Bond**	**5**
(Scotland) David McLellan	0
13	(Scotland) **Alan McManus**	**5**
(Scotland) Scott MacFarlane	2
22	(England) Tony Jones	4
(England) **Anthony Hamilton**	**5**
19	(England) Dean Reynolds	3
(Canada) **Cliff Thorburn**	**5**
2	(England) **John Parrott**	**5**
(England) Jonathan Birch	1

Last 32; Best of 9 frames
(Wales) **Tony Chappel**	**5**
(Republic of Ireland) Eugene Hughes	3
27	(Wales) **Mark Bennett**	**5**
12	(England) Martin Clark	2
11	(Northern Ireland) **Dennis Taylor**	**5**
53	(Northern Ireland) Joe Swail	2
17	(England) Mike Hallett	2
6	(Wales) **Terry Griffiths**	**5**
7	(Thailand) James Wattana	3
(Scotland) **Billy Snaddon**	**5**
21	(Republic of Ireland) **Ken Doherty**	**5**
15	(England) Willie Thorne	2
16	(Wales) Darren Morgan	3
47	(England) **Peter Ebdon**	**5**
32	(England) David Roe	4
4	(England) **Steve Davis**	**5**
3	(England) **Jimmy White**	**5**
(Wales) Cliff Wilson	2
31	(England) **Mark Johnston-Allen**	**5**
14	(Canada) Alain Robidoux	1
10	(England) **Steve James**	**5**
23	(England) Joe Johnson	1
(England) Nick Terry	2
5	(England) **Neal Foulds**	**5**
8	(England) Gary Wilkinson	4
(Scotland) **John Higgins**	**5**
(England) Bill Oliver	2
9	(England) **Nigel Bond**	**5**
13	(Scotland) **Alan McManus**	**5**
(England) Anthony Hamilton	2
(Canada) **Cliff Thorburn**	**5**
2	(England) John Parrott	3

Last 16; Best of 9 frames
(Wales) Tony Chappel	1
27	(Wales) **Mark Bennett**	**5**
11	(Northern Ireland) Dennis Taylor	2
6	(Wales) **Terry Griffiths**	**5**
(Scotland) Billy Snaddon	1
21	(Republic of Ireland) **Ken Doherty**	**5**
47	(England) Peter Ebdon	0
4	(England) **Steve Davis**	**5**
3	(England) **Jimmy White**	**5**
31	(England) Mark Johnston-Allen	0
10	(England) Steve James	4
5	(England) **Neal Foulds**	**5**
(Scotland) John Higgins	2
9	(England) **Nigel Bond**	**5**
13	(Scotland) **Alan McManus**	**5**
(Canada) Cliff Thorburn	1

Quarter-finals; Best of 9 frames
27	(Wales) Mark Bennett	2
6	(Wales) **Terry Griffiths**	**5**
21	(Republic of Ireland) **Ken Doherty**	**5**
4	(England) Steve Davis	2
3	(England) **Jimmy White**	**5**
5	(England) Neal Foulds	1
9	(England) Nigel Bond	3
13	(Scotland) **Alan McManus**	**5**

Semi-finals; Best of 17 frames
6	(Wales) Terry Griffiths	6
21	(Republic of Ireland) **Ken Doherty**	**9**
3	(England) **Jimmy White**	**9**
13	(Scotland) Alan McManus	5

Final; Best of 19 frames
21	(Republic of Ireland) Ken Doherty	9
3	(England) **Jimmy White**	**10**

=== Final ===
Final: Best of 19 frames. Referee: John Williams. Hexagon Theatre, Reading, England, 25 October 1992.
Ken Doherty (21); Ireland	9–**10**	**Jimmy White** (3); England
Afternoon: 59–**67** (Doherty 59), **118**–0 (67), **69**–51, **59**–12, **61**–27, **69**–20, 4–**130** (106), 36–**73** (72), 38–**85** (85); Evening: **65**–48, 43–**57**, 0–**75** (75), **89**–4 (53), 0–**96** (96), 0–**82** (65), **80**–0 (80), 69–**70**, **117**–0 (117), 2–**80**
**117**	Highest break	106
1	Century breaks	1
5	50+ breaks	**6**
