= Silvino Francisco =

South African snooker player (1946–2024)

Personal information
- Nickname: The Silver Fish
- Born: 3 May 1946 Cape Town, South Africa
- Died: 14 December 2024 (aged 78) Mansfield, England

Sport
- Country: South Africa
- Sport: Snooker
- Professional: 1981–1997
- Highest ranking: 10 (1987/88)

Tournament wins
- Ranking: 1

Silvino Francisco (3 May 1946 – 14 December 2024) was a South African professional snooker player who won the 1985 British Open.

== Snooker career ==
Francisco came from a snooker-playing family. His brother Manuel and nephew Peter both played at a high level, Manuel having been a runner-up in the World Amateur Billiards Championship on several occasions, and Peter having risen to the world ranking of number 14.

Francisco won the 1985 British Open, beating Kirk Stevens 12–9. Prior to the start of the Final match, Francisco accused Stevens of playing under the influence of drugs. Francisco was subsequently fined for the comments. The world governing body of snooker, the WPBSA, accepted that the accusation was false and it is on record that Kirk Stevens has never failed a drugs test in the history of his career. However, Stevens later admitted to having an addiction to cocaine.

He was involved in another scandal after the 1989 Masters. After losing 5–1 to Terry Griffiths in the last-16, it was discovered that there had been heavy betting on that exact score. Francisco was arrested, but later released without charge.

== Personal life and death ==
Francisco suffered gambling problems towards the end of his professional career, to the extent of being declared bankrupt in 1996 due to income tax arrears.

In 1997, Francisco was arrested for smuggling cannabis and served three years in prison.

Francisco married his wife June in the early 2000s. In his later years he dedicated himself to his family, specifically his grandchildren Enola and Osiris, charity work and the snooker youth.

Francisco died on 14 December 2024, aged 78.

He remains the only African snooker player to have won a professional snooker ranking event.

== Performance and rankings timeline ==
Tournament	1979/ 80	1981/ 82	1982/ 83	1983/ 84	1984/ 85	1985/ 86	1986/ 87	1987/ 88	1988/ 89	1989/ 90	1990/ 91	1991/ 92	1992/ 93	1993/ 94	1994/ 95	1995/ 96	1996/ 97
Ranking	(Note: He was an amateur.)	(Note: New players on the Main Tour do not have a ranking.)	17	21	17	13	12	10	12	23	26	24	28	33	57	81	125
Ranking tournaments
Asian Classic (Note: The event was also called the Dubai Masters (1988/1989), Dubai Classic (1989/90–1994/1995) and Thailand Classic (1995/1996).)	Tournament Not Held								NR	1R	3R	2R	2R	LQ	LQ	LQ	LQ
Grand Prix (Note: The event was also called the Professional Players Tournament (1982/83–1983/1984).)	Not Held		A	3R	3R	QF	SF	2R	1R	1R	2R	3R	1R	LQ	LQ	1R	LQ
UK Championship	Non-Ranking Event				1R	3R	2R	3R	2R	2R	3R	1R	1R	1R	LQ	LQ	LQ
German Open	Tournament Not Held															LQ	A
Welsh Open	Tournament Not Held											2R	2R	LQ	1R	LQ	LQ
International Open (Note: The event was also called the Goya Matchroom Trophy (1985/1986))	NH	NR	A	QF	SF	1R	QF	3R	2R	2R	Not Held		3R	1R	1R	LQ	LQ
European Open	Tournament Not Held								1R	2R	1R	1R	1R	LQ	LQ	LQ	LQ
Thailand Open (Note: The event was also called the Thailand Masters (1983/1984–1986/1987 & 1991/1992) and the Asian Open (1989/1990–1992/1993))	Not Held			Non-Ranking Event				Not Held		QF	WD	2R	1R	LQ	LQ	LQ	LQ
British Open (Note: The event was also called the British Gold Cup (1979/1980), Yamaha Organs Trophy (1980/1981) and International Masters (1981/1982–1983/1984))	Non-Ranking Event				W	2R	2R	2R	1R	1R	2R	2R	2R	LQ	LQ	LQ	LQ
World Championship	A	QF	1R	2R	1R	2R	2R	1R	2R	LQ	LQ	LQ	LQ	LQ	LQ	LQ	LQ
Non-ranking tournaments
Scottish Masters	NH	A	A	A	A	SF	A	A	NH	A	A	A	A	A	A	A	A
The Masters	A	A	A	A	A	1R	QF	1R	1R	A	LQ	LQ	LQ	LQ	WD	A	A
Pontins Professional	A	A	A	QF	A	A	A	A	A	A	A	A	A	A	A	A	A
Former ranking tournaments
Canadian Masters	Tournament Not Held					Non-Ranking			LQ	Tournament Not Held							
Hong Kong Open (Note: The event was also called the Australian Masters (1979/1980–1987/1988) and Australian Open (1994/1995))	Non-Ranking Event								NH	1R	Tournament Not Held				NR		NH
Classic	Non-Ranking			2R	1R	1R	QF	3R	3R	SF	1R	2R	Tournament Not Held				
Strachan Open	Tournament Not Held											1R	MR	NR	Not Held		
Former non-ranking tournaments
Limosin International	SF	Tournament Not Held															
Pontins Brean Sands	Not Held		F	Tournament Not Held													
Pot Black	A	A	A	QF	1R	A	Tournament Not Held					A	A	A	Not Held		
Australian Masters (Note: The event was also called the Hong Kong Open (1989/1990) and Australian Open (1994/1995))	A	A	A	A	A	1R	A	A	NH	A	Tournament Not Held				A	A	NH
South African Professional Championship	SF	Tournament Not Held					W	A	A	Tournament Not Held							
Shoot-Out	Tournament Not Held										1R	Tournament Not Held					
World Masters	Tournament Not Held										2R	Tournament Not Held					
World Seniors Championship	Tournament Not Held											QF	Tournament Not Held				

Performance Table Legend
LQ	lost in the qualifying draw	#R	lost in the early rounds of the tournament (WR = Wildcard round, RR = Round robin)	QF	lost in the quarter-finals
SF	lost in the semi-finals	F	lost in the final	W	won the tournament
DNQ	did not qualify for the tournament	A	did not participate in the tournament	WD	withdrew from the tournament

NH / Not Held	means an event was not held.
NR / Non-Ranking Event	means an event is/was no longer a ranking event.
R / Ranking Event	means an event is/was a ranking event.

== Career finals ==
=== Ranking finals: 1 (1 title) ===
Outcome	No.	Year	Championship	Opponent in the final	Score
Winner	1.	1985	British Open	(Canada) Kirk Stevens	12–9

=== Non-ranking finals: 3 (1 title) ===
Outcome	No.	Year	Championship	Opponent in the final	Score
Runner-up	1.	1978	South African Professional Championship	(South Africa) Perrie Mans	5–9
Runner-up	2.	1983	Pontins Brean Sands	(England) Tony Meo	7–9
Winner	1.	1986	South African Professional Championship	(South Africa) François Ellis	9–1

=== Team finals: 1 ===
Outcome	No.	Year	Championship	Team/partner	Opponent(s) in the final	Score
Runner-up	1.	1989	World Cup	Rest of the World	England	8–9

=== Amateur finals: 4 (4 titles) ===
Outcome	No.	Year	Championship	Opponent in the final	Score
Winner	1.	1968	South African Amateur Championship	(South Africa)	
Winner	2.	1969	South African Amateur Championship (2)	(South Africa)	
Winner	3.	1974	South African Amateur Championship (3)	(South Africa) Mike Hines	7–0
Winner	4.	1977	South African Amateur Championship (4)	(South Africa) Ayoob Majiet	
