= Gino Rigitano =

Canadian snooker player

Personal information
- Born: 14 August 1957 (age 69)

Sport
- Country: Canada
- Sport: Snooker
- Professional: 1983–1993
- Highest ranking: 77

Gino Rigitano (born 14 August 1957) is a Canadian former professional snooker player.

== Career ==
Rigitano was accepted as a professional by the World Professional Billiards and Snooker Association (WPBSA) in 1983. In the 1983–84 snooker season he defeated Marcel Gauvreau 9–6 in the first round of the 1983 Canadian Professional Championship, before losing 4–9 to Bernie Mikkelsen. In his four-player pre-qualifying group for the 1984 International Masters he progressed, recording 2–0 wins against both Dennis Hughes and Paul Medati, and 2–1 against Bill Oliver. In the next group round he played Jimmy White and Frank Jonik, with White winning the group and qualifying for the main event. At the 1984 World Snooker Championship, Rigitano was eliminated in the first round, 7–10 by Matt Gibson.

At the 1985 World Snooker Championship, Rigitano progressed to the last 48, with wins against Dessie Sheehan (10–9), Bob Harris (10–4), Billy Kelly (10–6), and Mick Fisher (10–2), before losing 8–10 to Neal Foulds. It was the furthest he had progressed in any event in the 1984–85 snooker season, and was his best-ever performance at the World Snooker Championship, and indeed at any major tournament.

Rigitano was one of 76 players to either resign their WPBSA membership, or have their professional status removed due to non-payment of the £100 membership fee, in 1993. The highest ranking that he achieved was 77th.
