= Peter Francisco (snooker player) =

South African snooker player (born 1962)

Personal information
- Born: 14 February 1962 (age 64) Cape Town, South Africa

Sport
- Country: South Africa
- Sport: Snooker
- Professional: 1984–1995
- Highest ranking: 14 (1988/89)
- Best ranking finish: Semi-final (x2)

Peter Francisco (born 14 February 1962) is a South African former professional snooker player who won the African Snooker Championship 4 times and South African Snooker Championship 8 times and the South African Billiards Championship 13 times as an amateur and professional.

== Career ==
Francisco won the South African amateur snooker championship each year from 1981 to 1983. He turned professional in 1984, and reached the final stages of the World Snooker Championship on five occasions. He reached the semifinals in two ranking events: the 1986 International Open and the 1987 Grand Prix.

In June 2013 he won the ABSF African Snooker Championship.

Francisco participated in the 2015 Six-red World Championship, playing five matches in his group. He lost 1–5 to Marco Fu and Jamie Clarke, 3–5 to Mark Williams and 4–5 to eventual champion Thepchaiya Un-Nooh and was eliminated after the group stage, but defeated Darren Paris 5–1.

== Controversy ==
In 1995, Francisco faced Jimmy White in the first round of the World Championship. Throughout the match, Francisco played numerous shots which caused bafflement on the part of BBC commentators Clive Everton, John Virgo and Dennis Taylor. There were an unusual number of bets made that the scoreline would be 10–2 in favour of Jimmy White, which was the eventual outcome. Betting had been suspended on the match against the South African shortly before it began and a World Snooker Association panel analysed the match and later banned Francisco for five years for not conducting himself in a manner consistent with his status as a professional sportsman. At the same hearing he was not found guilty of match rigging.

== Personal life ==
He is the son of snooker player Manuel Francisco and another professional player, Silvino Francisco, was his uncle.

== Performance and rankings timeline ==
| Tournament | 1984/ 85 | 1985/ 86 | 1986/ 87 | 1987/ 88 | 1988/ 89 | 1989/ 90 | 1990/ 91 | 1991/ 92 | 1992/ 93 | 1993/ 94 | 1994/ 95 |
|---|---|---|---|---|---|---|---|---|---|---|---|
| Ranking | (Note: New players on the Main Tour do not have a ranking.) | 59 | 26 | 18 | 14 | 25 | 24 | 19 | 25 | 38 | 61 |
Ranking tournaments
| Asian Classic (Note: The event was also called the Dubai Masters (1988/1989) and Dubai Classic (1989/90–1994/1995)) | Tournament Not Held | | | | NR | QF | 2R | 3R | 1R | LQ | LQ |
| Grand Prix | 2R | 3R | 2R | SF | 1R | 1R | QF | 1R | 1R | 1R | LQ |
| UK Championship | LQ | 2R | 2R | 2R | 2R | 3R | 2R | 2R | 1R | 1R | LQ |
| Welsh Open | Tournament Not Held | | | | | | | 3R | 1R | LQ | 2R |
| International Open (Note: The event was also called the Goya Matchroom Trophy (1985/1986)) | LQ | LQ | SF | 1R | 1R | 1R | Not Held | | 1R | LQ | LQ |
| European Open | Tournament Not Held | | | | 1R | 1R | 3R | 2R | 1R | LQ | LQ |
| Thailand Open (Note: The event was also called the Thailand Masters (1984/1985–1986/1987 & 1991/1992) and the Asian Open (1989/1990–1992/1993)) | Non-Ranking | | | Not Held | | 3R | 2R | 1R | 1R | LQ | LQ |
| British Open | 1R | 3R | 2R | 2R | QF | 3R | 2R | 2R | 1R | 1R | 3R |
| World Championship | LQ | LQ | LQ | 1R | 1R | 1R | LQ | 1R | LQ | LQ | 1R |
Non-ranking tournaments
| The Masters | A | A | A | A | 1R | A | LQ | LQ | LQ | LQ | WD |
Former ranking tournaments
| Canadian Masters | NH | Non-Ranking | | | LQ | Tournament Not Held | | | | | |
| Hong Kong Open (Note: The event was also called the Australian Masters (1984/1985–1987/1988) and Australian Open (1994/1995)) | Ranking Event | | | | NH | 1R | Tournament Not Held | | | | NR |
| Classic | LQ | 3R | 3R | 3R | 1R | 3R | 1R | 1R | Not Held | | |
| Strachan Open | Tournament Not Held | | | | | | | 1R | MR | NR | NH |
Former non-ranking tournaments
| Australian Masters (Note: The event was also called the Hong Kong Open (1989/1990) and Australian Open (1994/1995)) | A | 1R | A | A | NH | A | Tournament Not Held | | | | A |
| South African Professional Championship | A | A | SF | A | A | Tournament Not Held | | | | | |
| World Matchplay | Tournament Not Held | | | | 1R | A | A | A | A | Not Held | |
| Shoot-Out | Tournament Not Held | | | | | | 3R | Tournament Not Held | | | |
| World Masters | Tournament Not Held | | | | | | QF | Tournament Not Held | | | |

Performance Table Legend
| LQ | lost in the qualifying draw | #R | lost in the early rounds of the tournament (WR = Wildcard round, RR = Round robin) | QF | lost in the quarter-finals |
| SF | lost in the semi-finals | F | lost in the final | W | won the tournament |
| DNQ | did not qualify for the tournament | A | did not participate in the tournament | WD | withdrew from the tournament |

| NH / Not Held | means an event was not held. |
| NR / Non-Ranking Event | means an event is/was no longer a ranking event. |
| R / Ranking Event | means an event is/was a ranking event. |

== Career finals ==
=== Amateur finals: 10 (10 titles) ===
| Outcome | No. | Year | Championship | Opponent in the final | Score |
|---|---|---|---|---|---|
| Winner | 1. | 1981 | South African Amateur Championship | (South Africa) L Seranke | |
| Winner | 2. | 1982 | South African Amateur Championship (2) | (South Africa) S Davids | |
| Winner | 3. | 1983 | South African Amateur Championship (3) | (South Africa) Ayoub Majiet | |
| Winner | 4. | 1998 | South African Amateur Championship (4) | (South Africa) | |
| Winner | 5. | 1999 | South African Amateur Championship (5) | (South Africa) | |
| Winner | 6. | 2000 | South African Amateur Championship (6) | (South Africa) | |
| Winner | 7. | 2007 | South African Amateur Championship (7) | (South Africa) | |
| Winner | 8. | 2012 | ABSF African Snooker Championship | (Egypt) Mohamed Khairy | 6–2 |
| Winner | 9. | 2013 | ABSF African Snooker Championship (2) | (Libya) Khaled Belaid Abumdas | 6–2 |
| Winner | 10. | 2016 | ABSF African Snooker Championship (3) | (Egypt) Wael Talaat | 6–1 |
