= South African Amateur Championship (snooker) =

Snooker tournament

South African Snooker Championship
Tournament information
- Country: South Africa
- Established: 1937
- Organisation(s): Snooker and Billiards South Africa

The South African Snooker Championship is the South African amateur snooker tournament that has been held since 1937 under the S.A. Billiard Control Council. From 1950 to 1993 it was held under the S.A. Billiards And Snooker Association. Jimmy van Rensberg won the title a record 12 times.

The amalgamation of the white S.A. Billiards And Snooker Association and the non-white S.A. Billiards And Snooker Control Board happened in 1994 under the new governing body - Snooker and Billiards South Africa. This finally allowed for a unified national champion - Hitesh Naran.

== Winners ==
| Year | Winner S.A. Billiard Control Council | Runner-up |
|---|---|---|
| 1937 | Allan Prior | |
| 1938 | A H Ashby | |
| 1939 | Allan Prior | |
| 1940-1945 | Not held due to World War II | |
| 1946 | F Walker | |
| 1947 | Not held | |
| 1948 | F Walker | |
| 1949 | E Kerr | |

| Year | Winner S.A. Billiards And Snooker Association | Runner-up |
|---|---|---|
| 1950 | Tom "Taffy" Rees | |
| 1951 | Tom "Taffy" Rees | |
| 1952 | Tom "Taffy" Rees | |
| 1953 | Jimmy van Rensberg | Round robin |
| 1954 | Jimmy van Rensberg | |
| 1955 | Jimmy van Rensberg | |
| 1956 | F Walker | |
| 1957 | Jimmy van Rensberg | |
| 1958 | R Walker | |
| 1959 | Manuel Francisco | |
| 1960 | Perrie Mans | |
| 1961 | Jimmy van Rensberg | |
| 1962 | Jimmy van Rensberg | |
| 1963 | Jimmy van Rensberg | |
| 1964 | Manuel Francisco | (7-3) Jimmy van Rensberg |
| 1965 | Manuel Francisco | |
| 1966 | Manuel Francisco | |
| 1967 | Jimmy van Rensberg | (4-0) Silvino Francisco |
| 1968 | Silvino Francisco | |
| 1969 | Silvino Francisco | |
| 1970 | Silvino Francisco | (7-4) Jimmy van Rensberg |
| 1971 | Manuel Francisco | (7-2) Jimmy van Rensberg |
| 1972 | Jimmy van Rensberg | (7-5) Mike Hines |
| 1973 | Jimmy van Rensberg | |
| 1974 | Silvino Francisco | (7-0) Mike Hines |
| 1975 | Manuel Francisco | |
| 1976 | Not held | |
| 1977 | Silvino Francisco | Ayoob Majiet |
| 1978 | Jimmy van Rensberg | |
| 1979 | Francois Ellis | |
| 1980 | Francois Ellis | |
| 1981 | Peter Francisco | L Seranke |
| 1982 | Peter Francisco | S Davids |
| 1983 | Peter Francisco | Ayoub Majiet |
| 1984 | N van Niekerk | |
| 1985 | P Small-Shaw | |
| 1986 | Schalk Mouton | |
| 1987 | B Jones | |
| 1988 | Terry Reilly | |
| 1989 | Schalk Mouton | |
| 1990 | B Smith | |
| 1991 | Zbynek Vaic | |
| 1992 | D Lomas | |
| 1993 | B Jones | |

| Year | Winner S.A. Billiards And Snooker Control Board | Runner-up |
|---|---|---|
| 1977 | Ayoob Majiet | |
| 1978 | F. Abdie | |
| 1979 | Ayoob Majiet | |
| 1980 | Ayoob Majiet | |
| 1981 | L. Seranke | |
| 1982 | S. Davids | |
| 1983 | Ayoob Majiet | |
| 1984 | Ayoob Majiet | |
| 1985 | Ayoob Majiet | |
| 1986 | Ayoob Majiet | |
| 1987 | F. Haupt | |
| 1988 | F. Haupt | |
| 1989 | Hitesh Naran | |
| 1990 | Hitesh Naran | |
| 1991 | N. Mehta | |
| 1992 | Hitesh Naran | |
| 1993 | Hitesh Naran | |

| Year | Winner Unified | Runner-up |
|---|---|---|
| 1994 | Hitesh Naran | |
| 1995 | Warren Horsley | |
| 1996 | Hitesh Naran | |
| 1997 | Robbie Grace | |
| 1998 | Peter Francisco | |
| 1999 | Peter Francisco | |
| 2000 | Peter Francisco | |
| 2001 | Warren Horsley | (7-3) Gary Wadely |
| 2002 | Warren Horsley | (7-5) Francois Ellis |
| 2003 | Tauriq Samsodien | (7-4) Jonathan Godden |
| 2004 | Warren Horsley | (7-4) Abdul Allie |
| 2005 | Ricky Tregonning | (7-5) David Anderson |
| 2006 | Warren Horsley | |
| 2007 | Peter Francisco | |
| 2008 | Francois Ellis | David Anderson |
| 2009 | Warren Horsley | (7-1) Faariz Khan |
| 2010 | Tauriq Samsodien | |
| 2011 | Hitesh Naran | |
| 2012 | Kiashan Moodley | (7-4) Peter Francisco |
| 2013 | Fahkrie Gierdien | (7-1) Mutalieb Allie |
| 2014 | Fahkrie Gierdien | (7-2) Kiashan Moodley |
| 2015 | Faaris Kahn | Mutalieb Allie |
| 2016 | Peter Francisco | (7-6) Faaris Kahn |
| 2017 | Richard Halliday | (7-3) Kiashan Moodley |
| 2018 | Mutalieb Allie | (7-3) Tariq Samsodien |
| 2019 | David Anderson | (6-4) Fakhrie Gierdien |
| 2020 | Not played | |
| 2021 | Kiashan Moodley | Tauriq Samsodien |
| 2022 | Charl Jonck | (7-2) Kiashan Moodley |
| 2023 | Charl Jonck | (7-2) Kiashan Moodley |
| 2024 | Michael Davids | (6-4) Tauriq Samsodien |
| 2025 | Mutalieb Allie | (6-4) Michael Davids |
| 2026 | Charl Jonck | (6-2) Kiashan Moodley |
