= Jason Smith (snooker player) =

English snooker player

Personal information
- Born: 6 January 1964 (age 62) Mansfield

Sport
- Country: England
- Sport: Snooker
- Professional: 1987-1997
- Best ranking finish: Last 16 (1989 Grand Prix)

Jason Smith (born 6 January 1964) is an English former professional snooker player who had a ten year spell on the World Snooker Tour between 1987–88 and 1996-97.

== Career ==
From Peterborough, he was described as a protege of local cue sports player Mark Wildman. Smith turned professional ahead of the 1987-88 season, having already previously recorded a victory over Alex Higgins whilst competing as an amateur in Newmarket.

Smith reached the last-16 of the 1989 Grand Prix where he was defeated by world champion and eventual Grand Prix winner Steve Davis. Through the tournament he defeated Tony Meo, Peter Francisco, Jon Wright and Joe O'Boye.

He was defeated by Welshman Mark Bennett in the penultimate round of qualifying for the 1991 World Snooker Championships.
