= Terry Whitthread =

English snooker player

Personal information
- Born: 7 July 1964 (age 62)

Sport
- Country: England
- Sport: Snooker
- Professional: 1986–1992
- Highest ranking: 100

Terry Whitthread (born 7 July 1964) is an English former professional snooker player. He won the 1980 British Junior (under 16) snooker championship. After winning the 1985 English Amateur Championship by defeating Jim McNellan 13–3 in the final, he played professionally from 1986 to 1992. He never reached as far as a quarter-final whilst a professional; His highest ranking was 100.

== Career ==
Whitthread won the 1980 British Junior (under 16) snooker championship. At 14, he was one of a group of players known as the "Magnificent Seven" managed by Henry West, the others being Patsy Fagan, John Virgo, Joe Johnson, Tony Knowles, Tony Meo, and Jimmy White. Aged 15, he recorded a 3–1 win over 1979 World Champion Terry Griffiths at the Warners Holidays tournament in 1980. Whitthread was regarded as an outstanding prospect, but did not achieve the level of success that was predicted.

He won the 1985 English Amateur Championship, defeating Jim McNellan 13–3 in the final. At the 1985 IBSF World Snooker Championship Whitthread finished second behind McNellan in their round-robin qualifying group, and then lost 2–5 in the quarter-finals to the eventual champion Paul Mifsud.

He turned professional in 1986, recording one match win (other than a walkover) in seven tournaments in his debut season, a 5–1 defeat of Dennis Hughes in the first round of qualifying for the 1987 British Open. He never reached as far as a quarter-final whilst a professional, and did not compete professionally after 1992. His highest ranking was 100.
