= Manuel Francisco =

South African snooker and billiards player (died 2020)

Personal information
- Died: 2020 (aged 84)

Sport
- Country: South Africa
- Sport: Snooker
- Professional: 1986–1988, 1990–1992
- Highest ranking: 126 (1986–1988)

Manuel Francisco (died 2020, aged 84) was a South African professional snooker and billiards player who won the South African amateur Snooker Championship 6 times.

Francisco came from a snooker-playing family. His brother Silvino and eldest son Peter both played at a high level, Silvino himself winning the amateur title 4 times, and Peter having risen to the world ranking of number 14.

He won the national billiard championships 14 times since his first victory in 1959. Francisco came second in the world amateur billiard championships in 1969. He was the first double Springbok in snooker and billiards and set a world record for amateurs in 1965 with a break of 518.
