= Bill Oliver (snooker player) =

English former professional snooker player

Personal information
- Born: 3 December 1948 (age 77)

Sport
- Country: England
- Sport: Snooker
- Professional: 1983–1994
- Highest ranking: 77

Bill Oliver (born 3 December 1948) is an English former professional snooker player.

== Biography ==
Bill Oliver was born on 1 December 1948. As an amateur player, Oliver beat Ian Williamson 7–5 in the final of the 1981 Pontins Autumn Open. He became a professional snooker player in 1983 but never reached the last-16 of a major tournament. His highest ranking was 77. He owns a snooker club in Plymouth.

He made his television debut as a player in the 1984 World Doubles Championship, partnering Roger Bales in a 4–5 loss to Terry Griffiths and John Parrott in a match that finished at 12:30 am.

Oliver beat former champion Ray Reardon in the second qualifying round of the 1988 World Snooker Championship. Later that year he joined the board of the World Professional Billiards and Snooker Association (WPBSA), taking the place of Rex Williams. In September 1990 he withdrew from the 1990 Shoot-Out after the car he was driving to the venue skidded and went off the road into a ditch. Oliver required 15 stitches and had to wear a neck brace, but his passenger Mike Hallett was uninjured.

He entered the 2010 World Snooker Championship under an arrangement where members of the WPBSA who were not on the main World Snooker Tour could participate if they paid a fee of £200. He was beaten 1–5 by Nic Barrow in what was Oliver's first world championship match since 1994.
