= Bob Harris (snooker player) =

English snooker player

Personal information
- Born: 12 March 1956 (age 70)

Sport
- Country: England
- Sport: Snooker
- Professional: 1982–1995
- Highest ranking: 45

Bob Harris (born 12 March 1956) is an English former professional snooker player.

== Career ==
Harris was expelled from school at the age of 15, and started playing snooker matches for money. In 1981, He made a championship record break of 123 on his way to reaching the southern area final of the English Amateur Championship, finishing as runner-up after being defeated 9–13 by Vic Harris. He became a professional player in 1982.

In the 1982–83 snooker season, Harris lost his first professional match, 4–5 to George Scott in the qualifying competition for the 1982 International Open. In his next tournament, the 1982 UK Championship, he defeated Graham Cripsey 9-6 and Mike Watterson 9–3 to reach the first round of the main competition, where he was eliminated 6–9 by Patsy Fagan. He reached the same stage in the 1983 UK Championship, winning 9–8 against Eddie McLauglin and 9–3 against Jack Fitzmaurice before a 7–9 loss to Ray Reardon. He equalled this progress by reaching the last 32 of the 1985 Grand Prix, but never reached the last 16 of a major tournament.

Harris' best finish at the World Snooker Championship was in 1988, when in the qualifying competition he reached the last 48 with wins against Fagan and Eddie Sinclair before losing 4–10 against Eddie Charlton.

Having once been ranked 45th, he ended the 1994–95 snooker season ranked 188th, and did not play professionally again.
