= Jon Wright (snooker player) =

English snooker player

Personal information
- Nickname: Giro Jon
- Born: 10 August 1962 (age 64) London

Sport
- Country: England
- Sport: Snooker
- Professional: 1986–1993
- Highest ranking: 53 (1986/1987)
- Best ranking finish: Last 32 (x3)

Jon Wright (born 10 August 1962) is an English former professional snooker player.

== Career ==
Jon Wright was born on 10 August 1962 in London. In 1984 he entered two WPBSA Pro Ticket events; he reached the final at Event One, losing 4–5 to David Roe, but won Event Two, defeating Roe 5–1. Wright twice represented England in the World Amateur Snooker Championship (1984 & 1985), reaching the semi-final in 1984. During this period he was a regular winner on the Pro-Am circuit.

He did not turn professional until 1986, but in his first season on the main tour, performed well, making a break of 123 - the highest of his career - in a 9–7 win over Martin Smith en route to the last-64 of the 1986 UK Championship. There, he lost 1–9 to World Champion, Joe Johnson. In the 1987 Classic, Wright recovered from 2–4 behind to beat Eugene Hughes 5–4 but, having reached the last 32, lost 1–5 to Stephen Hendry.

At the 1987 World Championship, he overcame Pat Houlihan, Paddy Browne, Mark Wildman and Cliff Wilson - whitewashing Wildman 10–0 - to qualify for the first round proper at the Crucible Theatre. Drawn against Alex Higgins, Wright led 4–2 but eventually succumbed 6–10. His results were sufficient for him to finish the season ranked 53rd.

The 1987/1988 season brought no real progress for Wright, as he lost in the last-64 in the International Open, the Grand Prix and the Classic, beaten by Tony Meo, Jimmy White and Tony Knowles respectively, although he came within one round of a second successive Crucible appearance, losing 4–10 to Hendry in qualifying for the World Championship.

The following season heralded a quarter-final appearance in a WPBSA non-ranking event, where Wright lost 3–5 to David Taylor, and progress to the last 32 in the 1988 Classic, where he followed victories over Geoff Foulds and Rex Williams with a 2–5 defeat to John Parrott.

Following his first-round loss to Duncan Campbell in the 1989 World Snooker Championship, he slipped out of the top 64 in the rankings, finishing the season 67th. However, better form was to come in the 1990 Grand Prix, where he beat Eric Lawlor and Craig Edwards before losing 2–5, again to Hendry.

He experienced defeats at the same stage of the Grand Prix and the Classic the following year - 5–0 by Steve Davis and by the same scoreline to Danny Fowler. He again came close to a Crucible return in the 1992 World Championship. There, he beat Lawlor 10–7, Williams 10–2 and Jason Whittaker 10–6 to reach the final qualifying round, but lost 3–10 to Bob Chaperon.

1992/1993 would be Wright's final season as a professional; he lost to Darren Morgan in the last 64 at the 1993 European Open, but thereafter did not play another match. In September 1992, he was found guilty of "conduct unbecoming a professional sportsman" during a 3–5 qualifying defeat to Allison Fisher in the Dubai Classic, and suspended for the rest of the season. He was relegated from the tour in 1993.

== After professional snooker ==
After his professional career ended, Wright played amateur snooker in local leagues around the Suffolk area.

His Twitter bio and number plate reference his nickname "Giro Jon". A keen sports fan Jon enjoys watching Boxing and Darts as well as Snooker.
