= Dennis Hughes (snooker player) =

English snooker player (born 1937)

Personal information
- Born: 30 January 1937 (age 89)

Sport
- Country: England
- Sport: Snooker
- Professional: 1981–1995
- Highest ranking: 88 (1985–1986)

Dennis Hughes (born 30 January 1937) is an English former professional snooker player from Manchester. He played professionally from 1981 to 1994.

== Career ==
Hughes was accepted as a member by the World Professional Billiards and Snooker Association (WPBSA) in 1981. His first professional tournament was the 1981 International Open, where he defeated Jackie Rea 5–4 in the first qualifying round before being eliminated 1–5 by Bert Demarco. He lost to Mike Hallett 6–9 in qualifying for at the 1981 UK Championship and 2–3 at the 1982 Bass and Golden Leisure Classic. In the last tournament of his debut season, the 1982 World Snooker Championship, he recorded a 9–4 win over Clive Everton before losing in the second qualifying round (last 48) 4–9 to Tony Meo. He never reached further than the last 48 of a major tournament, and in 1990 was due to lose his professional status after being defeated 1–10 by Alan McManus in a play-off match, one of a series of matches where the lowest-ranked professionals faced leading amateurs with a place on the professional tour at stake. However, the WPBSA soon opened membership for events to anyone over the age of 16 that paid the relevant fee, and Hughes continued to play in professional tournaments until 1994, finishing the 1993–94 snooker season ranked 489, and dropping to 525 in the following year's list, having not competed for a year.

His highest ranking achieved as a professional was 88, in the snooker world rankings 1985/1986.
