= 1991–92 snooker world rankings =

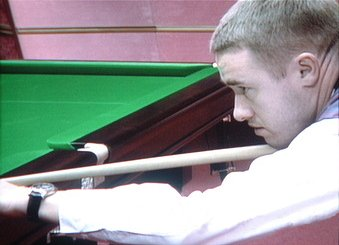
Stephen Hendry (pictured in 2003) retained top place in the ranking list.

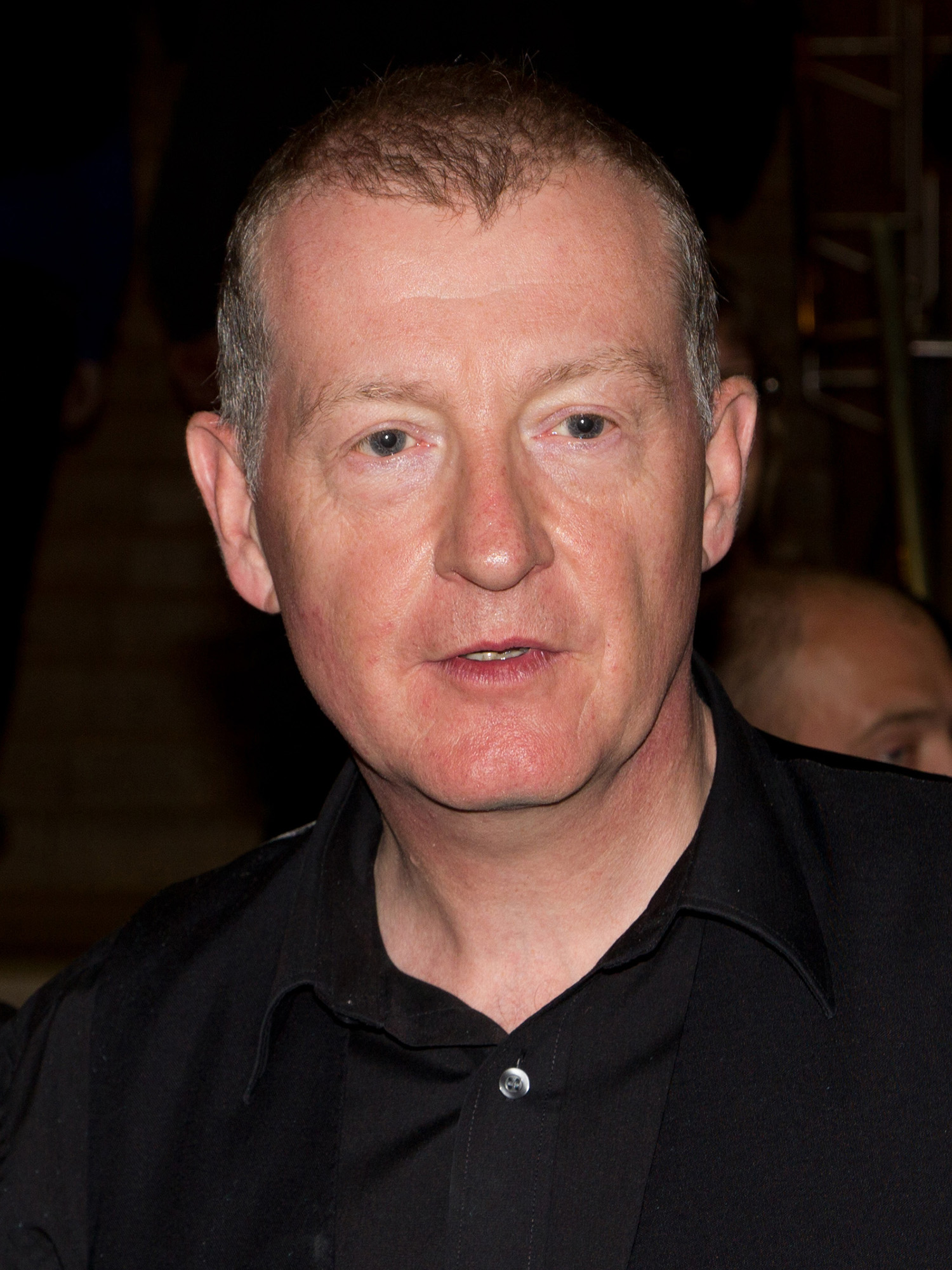
Steve Davis (pictured in 2010) was ranked second, keeping his place from the previous season.

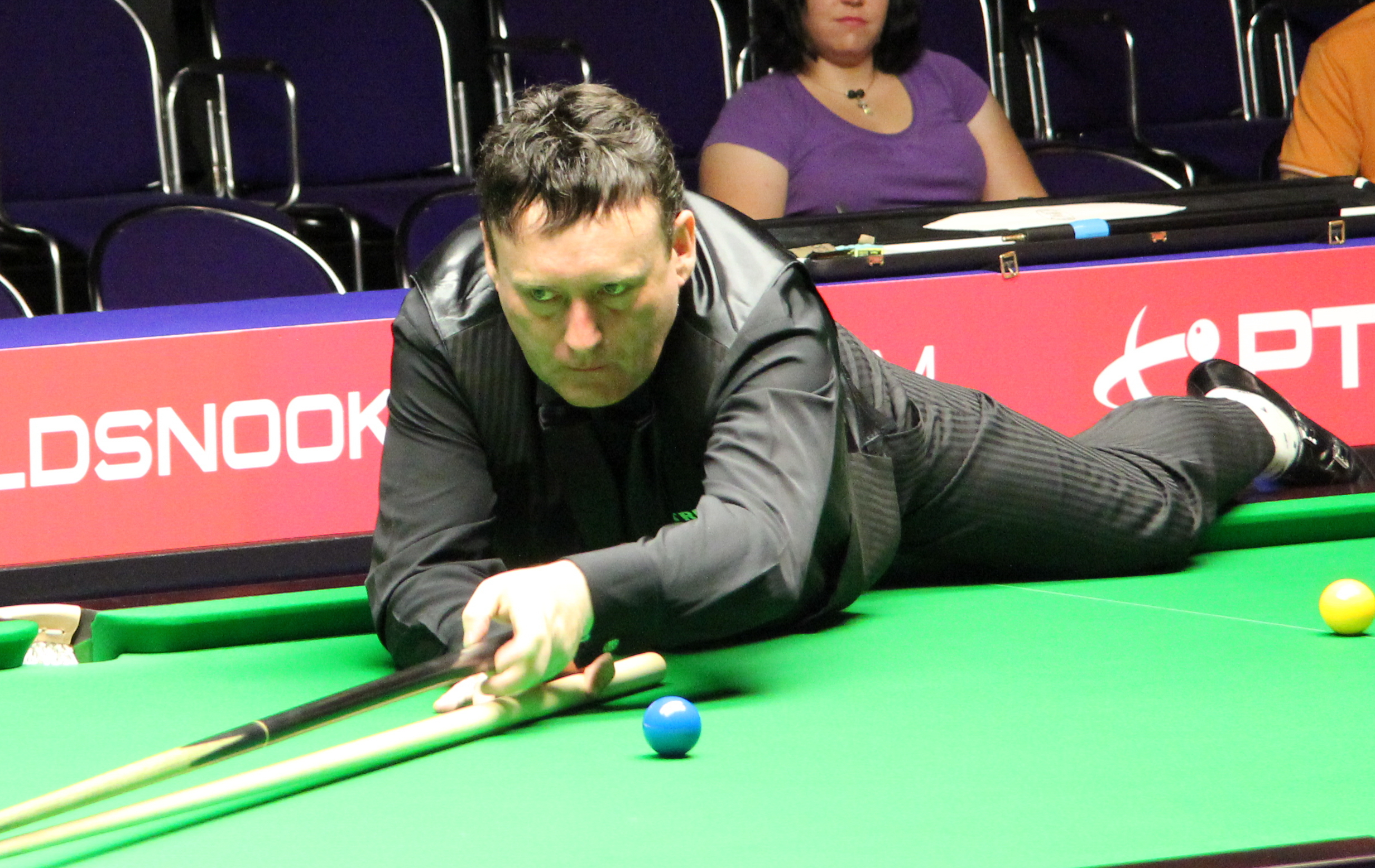
Jimmy White (pictured in 2011) moved up one place to third, overtaking John Parrott who had defeated him in the final of the 1991 World Snooker Championship.

The World Professional Billiards and Snooker Association (WPBSA), the governing body for professional snooker, first introduced a ranking system for professional players in 1976, with the aim of seeding players for the World Snooker Championship. For 1991–92, the reigning champion for any tournament would be automatically seeded first, the current world champion seeded second (if not already seeded first), and the other seedings were based on the ranking list. Initially, the rankings were based on performances in the preceding three world championships. The 1983–84 snooker world rankings were the first to take tournaments other than the world championship into account and several additional tournaments were designated as ranking tournaments over the following years. The list for the 1986–87 snooker season was the first to only take account of results over two seasons and the rankings for 1991–92 were also based on results from the preceding two seasons. There were eighteen ranking events taken into consideration for the 1991–92 ranking list: ten in the 1989–90 snooker season and eight in the 1990–91 snooker season. The ranking list was published soon after the conclusion of the 1991 World Snooker Championship.

Stephen Hendry was ranked first, with 85 ranking points, ahead of Steve Davis with 57 and Jimmy White with 51. Snooker Scene magazine commented that Hendry's lead was larger than the equivalent of four ranking tournament wins. Gary Wilkinson and Tony Jones were in the top 16, regarded as the elite of the game, for the first time. Wilkinson, runner-up at the 1991 British Open, rose from 19th to 5th and the 1991 European Open champion Jones moved from 35th to 15th. Tony Knowles regained a place in the top 16, while Willie Thorne, John Virgo and Tony Meo dropped out of it.

Alan McManus at 41st and Ken Doherty at 51st were the highest placed of those who had been on the professional circuit for only one season. Alex Higgins had 25 ranking points deducted from his 1989–90 total and was banned for the 1990–91 season by the WPBSA following a disciplinary inquiry. He fell from 97th to 120th. (Note: These penalties were imposed by the WPBSA following a hearing conducted for the Association by Gavin Lightman, a barrister, which considered several incidents including Higgins punching a press officer, threatening to arrange for fellow player Dennis Taylor to be shot, and insulting both Taylor and WPBSA chairman John Spencer.) There were 165 players on the original list issued by the WBPSA, but four players who did not pay their membership fees were subsequently excluded: Jimmy van Rensberg (originally 119th), Patsy Fagan (originally 146th), Mike Hines (originally 159th) and Frank Jonik (originally 160th).

== Points tariff and basis of ranking ==
Points tariff contributing to the Snooker world rankings 1991–92
Placing	1990 and 1991 world championships	Other ranking tournaments 1989–90 and 1990–91
Champion	10	6
Runner-up	8	5
Losing semi-finalist	6	4
Losing quarter-finalist	4	3
Last 16 loser	2	2
Last 32 loser	1 ranking point or 2 merit points (Note: Players who qualified received a ranking point. Players exempted until this round received two merit points.)	1
Final qualifying round loser	2 merit points	1 merit point
Penultimate qualifying round loser	1 merit point	1 A point
Antepenultimate qualifying round loser	1 A point	Frames won counted
Preliminary round loser	Frames won counted	–

Ranking was determined as follows:

- By number of ranking points.
- If players had an equal number of ranking points, precedence was given to the player with the better performances in the later season.
- If players were still equal, merit points were considered. If they were still tied, precedence was given to the player with the better performances in the later season.
- If players were still equal, A points were considered. If they were still tied, precedence was given to the player with the better performances in the later season.
- If players were still equal, frames won were considered. If they were still tied, precedence was given the player with the better performances in the later season.

== Rankings ==
Key:

- "(New)" denotes a player that was a new professional for 1990–91; "*" denotes that the player was not a professional during the season.
- "X" denotes that the player was banned from competing in the 1990–91 season.

Note: the breakdown of points per season for players ranked below 64 is not provided in sources. Blank cells indicate that the information is not provided in sources for the ranking list.

Snooker world rankings 1991–92
Ranking	Name	1989–90 season				1990–91 season				Total			
Ranking	Name	Ranking points	Merit points	A points	Frames	Ranking points	Merit points	A points	Frames	Ranking points	Merit points	A points	Frames
1	Stephen Hendry (SCO)	44	1	–	–	41	–	–	–	85	1	–	–
2	Steve Davis (ENG)	33	–	–	–	24	2	–	–	57	2	–	–
3	Jimmy White (ENG)	24	1	–	–	27	1	–	–	51	2	–	–
4	John Parrott (ENG)	26	1	–	–	22	2	–	–	48	3	–	–
5	Gary Wilkinson (ENG)	17	1	2	–	21	1	–	–	38	2	2	–
6	Neal Foulds (ENG)	18	1	–	–	20	–	–	–	38	1	–	–
7	Steve James (ENG)	22	2	–	–	14	3	–	–	36	5	–	–
8	Mike Hallett (ENG)	16	2	–	–	17	3	–	–	33	5	–	–
9	Dennis Taylor (NIR)	13	4	–	–	17	2	–	–	30	6	–	–
10	Doug Mountjoy (WAL)	19	3	–	–	11	3	–	–	30	6	–	–
11	Terry Griffiths (WAL)	15	3	–	–	12	2	–	–	27	5	–	–
12	Dean Reynolds (ENG)	16	2	–	–	11	3	–	–	27	5	–	–
13	Alain Robidoux (CAN)	15	–	2	–	10	2	–	–	25	2	2	–
14	Martin Clark (ENG)	16	2	–	–	9	1	–	–	25	3	–	–
15	Tony Jones (ENG)	11	1	3	–	12	2	2	–	23	3	5	–
16	Tony Knowles (ENG)	13	4	–	–	10	2	–	–	23	6	–	–
17	Willie Thorne (ENG)	13	2	–	–	9	4	–	–	22	6	–	–
19	Dene O'Kane (NZL)	12	5	–	–	9	4	–	–	21	9	–	–
19	Peter Francisco (RSA)	12	4	–	–	9	3	–	–	21	7	–	–
20	James Wattana (THA)	12	3	3	–	9	2	1	–	21	5	4	–
21	Nigel Bond (ENG)	10	4	2	4	10	4	2	–	20	8	4	4
22	Tony Drago (MLT)	10	3	–	–	9	3	–	–	19	6	–	–
23	Steve Newbury (WAL)	14	3	–	–	5	3	–	–	19	6	–	–
24	Silvino Francisco (RSA)	10	6	–	–	8	4	–	–	18	10	–	–
25	Wayne Jones (WAL)	11	2	–	–	7	5	–	–	17 (Note: Inconsistent totals reflect the sources.)	7	–	–
26	Joe Johnson (ENG)	9	6	–	–	7	3	–	–	16	9	–	–
27	Eddie Charlton (AUS)	7	4	–	–	6	2	–	–	15	6	–	–
28	Danny Fowler (ENG)	10	5	1	–	5	6	–	–	15	11	1	–
29	Mark Bennett (WAL)	8	4	1	–	6	3	1	–	14	7	2	–
30	Bob Chaperon (CAN)	11	5	–	–	3	7	–	–	14	12	–	–
31	John Virgo (ENG)	12	3	–	–	2	7	–	–	14	10	–	–
32	Cliff Wilson (WAL)	7	5	–	–	6	4	–	–	13	9	–	–
33	Darren Morgan (WAL)	7	5	2	–	6	2	1	–	13	7	3	–
34	Tony Meo (ENG)	7	3	–	–	5	5	–	–	12	8	–	–
35	Brady Gollan (CAN)	5	2	2	6	6	1	4	–	11	3	6	6
36	Cliff Thorburn (CAN)	7	5	–	–	4	7	–	–	11	12	–	–
37	Tony Chappel (WAL)	4	4	3	–	6	1	4	–	10	5	7	–
38	Barry West (ENG)	7	6	–	–	3	6	–	–	10	12	–	–
39	Warren King (AUS)	8	3	3	–	2	4	2	–	10	7	5	–
40	Les Dodd (ENG)	6	3	2	5	3	4	4	5	9	7	6	5
41	Alan McManus (SCO) (New)	*	*	*	*	8	3	–	6	8	3	–	6
42	Ian Graham (ENG)	4	6	3	–	4	3	2	–	8	9	5	–
43	John Campbell (AUS)	4	3	4	–	4	3	2	–	8	6	6	–
44	Colin Roscoe (WAL)	4	3	5	–	4	1	4	–	8	4	9	–
45	Eugene Hughes (IRL)	5	7	–	–	3	3	4	–	8	10	4	–
46	Robert Marshall (ENG)	6	4	2	5	2	3	3	5	8	7	5	5
47	Brian Morgan (ENG)	8	2	1	7	–	1	7	7	8	3	8	7
48	Rex Williams (ENG)	4	7	–	–	3	6	1	–	7	13	1	–
49	Jack McLaughlin (NIR)	4	6	2	–	3	3	3	–	7	9	5	–
50	David Roe (ENG)	5	7	–	–	2	2	4	–	7	9	4	–
51	Ken Doherty (IRL) (New)	*	*	*	*	6	2	1	3	6	2	1	3
52	Mark Johnston-Allen (ENG)	1	8	2	–	5	3	4	–	6	11	6	–
53	Franky Chan (HKG) (New)	*	*	*	*	5	1	2	9	5	1	2	9
54	Rod Lawler (ENG) (New)	*	*	*	*	4	4	2	0	4	4	2	0
55	Jon Birch (ENG) (New)	*	*	*	*	4	2	2	3	4	2	2	3
56	Jason Prince (NIR) (New)	*	*	*	*	4	2	1	5	4	2	1	5
57	Jim Wych (CAN)	1	6	1	–	3	5	2	–	4	11	3	–
58	Kirk Stevens (CAN)	1	1	8	–	3	1	2	12	4	2	10	12
59	Nigel Gilbert (ENG)	2	2	6	–	2	4	2	–	4	6	8	–
60	Nick Dyson (ENG)	2	2	4	11	2	2	3	2	4	4	7	13
61	Craig Edwards (ENG)	2	2	2	11	2	–	6	11	4	2	8	11
62	Jim Chambers (ENG)	3	6	2	–	1	–	7	–	4	6	9	–
63	Steve Duggan (ENG)	4	4	3	–	–	2	6	4	4	6	9	–
64	Mark Rowing (ENG)	3	3	2	12	–	3	5	–	3	6	7	12
65	Stephen Murphy (IRE)	1				1				2	5	5	24
66	Duncan Campbell (SCO)	–				2				2	4	9	11
67	Ken Owers (ENG)	–				2				2	3	6	20
68	Robby Foldvari (AUS)	–				2				2	2	2	54
69	Jason Whittaker (ENG) (New)	*	*	*	*	2	1	3	13	2	1	3	13
70	Andrew Cairns (ENG)	1				1				2	7	6	8
71	Joe O'Boye (IRL)	1				1				2	7	7	–
72	Murdo MacLeod (SCO)	1				1				2	7	9	–
73	Barry Pinches (ENG)	1				1				2	4	6	15
74	David Taylor (ENG)	2				–				2	9	7	–
75	Jason Smith (ENG)	2				–				2	5	5	27
76	Joe Grech (MLT)	2				–				2	4	2	7
77	Brian Rowswell (ENG)	2				–				2	3	10	8
78	Paul Gibson (ENG)	2				–				2	2	4	29
79	Bob Harris (ENG)	–				1				1	9	6	4
80	Steve Campbell (ENG)	–				1				1	7	6	15
81	Gary Natale (CAN) (New)	*	*	*	*	1	1	2	11	1	1	2	11
82	Mick Price (ENG)	1				–				1	10	3	13
82	Paddy Browne (IRL)	1				–				1	9	8	–
84	Roger Bales (ENG)	1				–				1	6	7	10
85	John Spencer (ENG)	1				–				1	6	11	–
86	Tony Wilson (IOM)	1				–				1	5	6	19
87	Bill Oliver (ENG)	1				–				1	5	5	28
88	Mario Morra (CAN)	1				–				1	4	9	9
89	Marcel Gauvreau (CAN)	1				–				1	4	7	21
90	Tommy Murphy (NIR)	1				–				1	4	11	6
91	Dave Gilbert (ENG)	1				–				1	4	11	5
92	Martin Smith (ENG)	1				–				1	2	8	23
93	Paul Medati (ENG)	1				–				1	2	6	27
94	Ian Brumby (ENG)	1				–				1	2	5	30
95	Ray Edmonds (ENG)	–				–				–	8	8	9
96	Jon Wright (ENG)	–				–				–	8	3	19
97	Nick Terry (ENG)	–				–				–	7	7	8
98	Steve Longworth (ENG)	–				–				–	6	12	–
99	Chris Cookson (ENG) (New)	*	*	*	*	–	5	1	12	–	5	1	12
100	John Rea (SCO)	–				–				–	5	8	15
101	Graham Miles (ENG)	–				–				–	5	4	24
102	Eddie Sinclair (SCO)	–				–				–	5	6	22
103	Graham Cripsey (ENG)	–				–				–	4	8	19
104	Pat Houlihan (ENG)	–				–				–	4	7	16
105	Dave Martin (ENG)	–				–				–	4	6	14
106	Ian Williamson (ENG)	–				–				–	3	8	21
107	Steve Meakin (ENG)	–				–				–	3	5	29
108	Jason Ferguson (ENG) (New)	*	*	*	*	–	2	2	10	–	2	2	10
109	Mick Fisher (ENG)	–				–				–	2	11	11
110	Paul Watchorn (IRL)	–				–				–	2	4	28
111	Anthony Kearney (IRL)	–				–				–	1	8	21
112	Gino Rigitano (CAN)	–				–				–	1	5	24
113	Eric Lawlor (ENG)	–				–				–	1	5	24
114	George Scott (ENG)	–				–				–	1	4	20
115	Matt Gibson (SCO)	–				–				–	1	4	43
116	Vic Harris (ENG)	–				–				–	1	4	29
118	Robbie Grace (RSA)	–				–				–	1	3	21
118	Jim Donnelly (SCO)	–				–				–	1	2	43
119	François Ellis (RSA)	–				–				–	1	1	37
120	Alex Higgins (NIR)	–	1	–	–	X	X	X	X	–	1	–	–
121	Malcolm Bradley (ENG)	–	–			–	–			–	–	9	23
122	Anthony Harris (ENG)	–	–			–	–			–	–	7	44
123	Jack Fitzmaurice (ENG)	–	–			–	–			–	–	7	27
124	John Dunning (ENG)	–	–			–	–			–	–	6	23
125	Mike Darrington (ENG)	–	–			–	–			–	–	5	33
126	Ray Reardon (WAL)	–	–			–	–			–	–	5	17
127	Billy Kelly (IRL)	–	–			–	–			–	–	5	8
128	Jim Bear (CAN)	–	–			–	–			–	–	4	27
129	Mark Wildman (ENG)	–	–			–	–			–	–	4	20
130	Jim Meadowcroft (ENG)	–	–			–	–			–	–	4	8
131	Fred Davis (ENG)	–	–			–	–			–	–	3	19
132	Terry Whitthread (ENG)	–	–			–	–			–	–	2	26
133	Mike Watterson (ENG)	–	–			–	–			–	–	2	20
134	Dessie Sheehan (IRL)	–	–			–	–			–	–	2	33
135	Glen Wilkinson (AUS)	–	–			–	–			–	–	2	18
136	Dennis Hughes (ENG)	–	–			–	–			–	–	2	15
137	Geoff Foulds (ENG)	–	–			–	–			–	–	2	12
138	Vladimir Potazsnyk (AUS)	–	–		–	–	–	–		–	–	1	–
139	Greg Jenkins (AUS)	–	–			–	–			–	–	1	10
140	Clive Everton (WAL)	–	–		–	–	–		–	–	–	1	–
141	Paul Thornley (CAN)	–	–	–		–	–	–		–	–	–	23
142	Derek Heaton (ENG)	–	–	–		–	–	–		–	–	–	6
143	Derek Mienie (RSA)	–	–	–		–	–	–		–	–	–	5
144	Ian Black (SCO)	–	–	–		–	–	–		–	–	–	3
145	Bernie Mikkelsen (CAN)	–	–	–		–	–	–		–	–	–	2
146	Bill Werbeniuk (CAN)	–	–	–		–	–	–		–	–	–	1
147	Ian Anderson (AUS)	–	–	–	–	–	–	–	–	–	–	–	–
148	Bernard Bennett (ENG)	–	–	–	–	–	–	–	–	–	–	–	–
149	Pascal Burke (IRL)	–	–	–	–	–	–	–	–	–	–	–	–
150	Joe Cagianello (CAN)	–	–	–	–	–	–	–	–	–	–	–	–
151	Lou Condo (AUS)	–	–	–	–	–	–	–	–	–	–	–	–
152	Bert Demarco (SCO)	–	–	–	–	–	–	–	–	–	–	–	–
153	Manuel Francisco (RSA)	–	–	–	–	–	–	–	–	–	–	–	–
154	Sam Frangie (AUS)	–	–	–	–	–	–	–	–	–	–	–	–
155	James Giannaros (AUS)	–	–	–	–	–	–	–	–	–	–	–	–
156	David Greaves (ENG)	–	–	–	–	–	–	–	–	–	–	–	–
157	Steve Mizerak (USA)	–	–	–	–	–	–	–	–	–	–	–	–
158	Paddy Morgan (AUS)	–	–	–	–	–	–	–	–	–	–	–	–
159	Maurice Parkin (ENG)	–	–	–	–	–	–	–	–	–	–	–	–
160	Jim Rempe (USA)	–	–	–	–	–	–	–	–	–	–	–	–
161	Gerry Watson (CAN)	–	–	–	–	–	–	–	–	–	–	–	–

== Ranking tournaments ==
Results of the finals for tournaments contributing to the 1991–92 snooker world rankings
Tournament	Winner	Runner-up	Score
1989 Hong Kong Open	Mike Hallett (ENG)	Dene O'Kane (NZL)	9–8
1989 Asian Open	Stephen Hendry (SCO)	James Wattana (THA)	9–6
1989 International Open	Steve Davis (ENG)	Stephen Hendry (SCO)	9–4
1989 Grand Prix	Steve Davis (ENG)	Dean Reynolds (ENG)	10–0
1989 Dubai Classic	Stephen Hendry (SCO)	Doug Mountjoy (WAL)	9–2
1989 UK Championship	Stephen Hendry (SCO)	Steve Davis (ENG)	16–12
1990 Classic	Steve James (ENG)	Warren King (AUS)	10–6
1990 British Open	Bob Chaperon (CAN)	Alex Higgins (NIR)	10–8
1990 European Open	John Parrott (ENG)	Stephen Hendry (SCO)	10–6
1990 World Snooker Championship	Stephen Hendry (SCO)	Jimmy White (ENG)	18–12
1990 Grand Prix	Stephen Hendry (SCO)	Nigel Bond (ENG)	10–5
1990 Asian Open	Stephen Hendry (SCO)	Dennis Taylor (NIR)	9–3
1990 Dubai Classic	Stephen Hendry (SCO)	Steve Davis (ENG)	9–1
1990 UK Championship	Stephen Hendry (SCO)	Steve Davis (ENG)	16–15
1991 Classic	Jimmy White (ENG)	Stephen Hendry (SCO)	10–4
1991 British Open	Stephen Hendry (SCO)	Gary Wilkinson (ENG)	10–9
1991 European Open	Tony Jones (ENG)	Mark Johnston-Allen (ENG)	9–7
1991 World Snooker Championship	John Parrott (ENG)	Jimmy White (ENG)	18–11

Preceded by 1990–91	1991–92	Succeeded by 1992–93
