= 1989 World Snooker Championship =

Professional snooker tournament

1989 Embassy World Snooker Championship
Tournament information
- Dates: 15 April – 1 May 1989
- Venue: Crucible Theatre
- City: Sheffield
- Country: England
- Organisation: WPBSA
- Format: Ranking event
- Total prize fund: £525,000
- Winner's share: £105,000
- Highest break: Stephen Hendry (SCO) (141)

Final
- Champion: Steve Davis (ENG)
- Runner-up: John Parrott (ENG)
- Score: 18–3

The 1989 World Snooker Championship (also referred to as the Embassy World Snooker Championship for sponsorship reasons) was a professional snooker tournament that took place from 15 April to 1 May 1989 at the Crucible Theatre in Sheffield, England. Organised by the World Professional Billiards and Snooker Association, it was the eighth and final ranking event of the 1988–89 snooker season and the thirteenth consecutive World Snooker Championship to be held at the Crucible, the first tournament at this location having taken place in 1977. There were 142 entrants to the competition.

The defending champion was Steve Davis, who had previously won the World Championship five times. He met John Parrott in the final, which was a best-of-35-frames match. Davis won the match 18–3, which remains the biggest winning margin in the sport's modern era, and meant that the final, scheduled for four sessions, finished with a session to spare. This was Davis's sixth and last world title, and his last appearance in a World Championship final. Stephen Hendry scored the championship's highest break, a 141, in his quarter-final match. There were 19 century breaks compiled during the championship.

A five-round qualifying event for the championship was held at the Preston Guild Hall from 22 March to 4 April 1989 for 126 players, 16 of whom reached the main stage, where they met the 16 invited seeded players. The tournament was broadcast in the United Kingdom by the BBC, and was sponsored by the Embassy cigarette company. Davis received £105,000 from the total prize fund of £525,000.

== Overview ==
The World Snooker Championship is an annual professional snooker tournament organised by the World Professional Billiards and Snooker Association (WPBSA). Founded in the late 19th century by British Army soldiers stationed in India, the cue sport gained popularity in the British Isles in the 1920s and 1930s. In the modern era, which started in 1969 when the World Championship reverted to a knockout format, it has become increasingly popular worldwide, especially in East and Southeast Asian nations such as China, Hong Kong and Thailand.

Joe Davis won the first World Championship in 1927, hosted by the Billiards Association and Control Council, the final match being held at Camkin's Hall in Birmingham, England. Since 1977, the event has been held at the Crucible Theatre in Sheffield, England. The 1989 championship featured 32 professional players competing in one-on-one snooker matches in a single-elimination format, each round being played over a pre-determined number of frames, and each match divided into two or more sessions containing a set number of frames. These competitors in the main tournament were selected using a combination of the top 16 players in the snooker world rankings and the winners of a pre-tournament qualification stage. It was the eighth and final ranking event of the 1988–89 snooker season, and the thirteenth consecutive World Snooker Championship to be held at the Crucible, the first tournament there having taken place in 1977. The defending champion in 1989 was Steve Davis, who had defeated Terry Griffiths 18–11 in the final of the 1988 World Snooker Championship to win his fifth world title. The 1989 championship was sponsored by cigarette brand Embassy, and was also referred to as the Embassy World Snooker Championship. The tournament was broadcast in the United Kingdom by the BBC.

=== Prize fund ===
The breakdown of prize money for the championship is shown below:

- Winner: £105,000
- Runner-up: £63,000
- Semi-finalist: £31,500
- Quarter-finalist: £15,750
- Last 16: £7,875
- Last 32: £4,429.68
- Last 48: £3,445.31
- Last 64: £1,804.68
- Highest break (televised stage): £10,500
- Highest break (untelevised stage): £2,625
- Maximum break: £100,000
- Total: £525,000

== Tournament summary ==
=== Qualifying ===
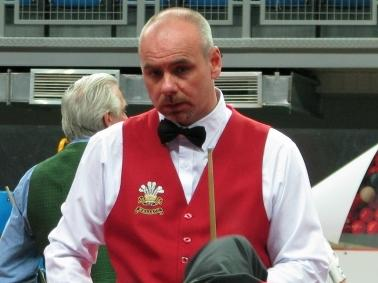
Darren Morgan (pictured in 2008) defeated former champion Alex Higgins 10–8.

Qualifying matches took place at Preston Guild Hall from 22 March to 4 April 1989, all matches being the best of 19 frames. There were 126 participants in the qualifying competition, 16 of whom reached the main stage, where they met the 16 invited seeded players. Mannie Francisco, playing his first match in the United Kingdom since losing in the final of the 1972 World Amateur Snooker Championship, led Tony Wilson 5–4 after their first session, but was eliminated 6–10. Darren Morgan compiled breaks of 108 and 103 against Eric Lawlor, the first time that two century breaks had been achieved in consecutive frames in the World Snooker Championship. Bill Werbeniuk had been due to return to competitive play after a six-month ban imposed by the WPBSA for his use of beta blockers, but did not appear for his match. From 4–9 in arrears, Paddy Browne won six consecutive frames against Steve Meakin to progress to the next round, 10–9 after a deciding frame. Joe O'Boye built a 9–0 lead over Danny Fowler, who then won six successive frames before O'Boye achieved a 10–6 victory. Six-time champion Ray Reardon was eliminated 5–10 by Gary Wilkinson.

In the final round qualifying, Tony Meo established a new record highest break for world championship qualifying by compiling a 142 during his defeat of Tony Jones. Steve Duggan eliminated two former World Championship title-holders, Fred Davis and John Spencer. Another ex-champion, Alex Higgins, failed to qualify for the championship for the first time in his career, after he lost to Morgan. Higgins, the world number 17, who had beaten four of the top seven players in the rankings on the way to victory at the 1989 Irish Masters on 2 April, was defeated 8–10 by Morgan the following day. Morgan broke Meo's record for the highest break in world championship qualifying by compiling a break of 143, his fourth century break of the competition. Seven players qualified for the main event for the first time: Morgan, Wilkinson, Browne, O'Boye, Duggan, Steve Newbury, and David Roe.

=== First round ===
The first round took place between 15 and 20 April, each match played over two sessions as the best of 19 frames. Defending champion Davis played Newbury, and took a 7–2 lead at the end of the first session after being 0–2 behind. Newbury won the first three frames of the second session to narrow the deficit to 5–7 before Davis won 10–5. For the seventh time, Cliff Wilson failed to win a match at the Crucible, eliminated 1–10 by Steve Duggan. Winning seven consecutive frames to move from 2–4 behind Tony Knowles to 9–4 ahead, David Roe went on to defeat Knowles 10–6. Mike Hallett was 0–3 behind Doug Mountjoy before winning the fourth frame after he fluked a yellow, ended the first session at 4–4, then fell 4–6 behind, but won six of the next seven frames to progress to the next round 10–7.

Terry Griffiths led Bob Chaperon 4–0 and, always at least three frames ahead from that point on, won 10–6. Silvino Francisco eliminated Joe O'Boye 10–6 after leading 6–1. Paddy Browne was 5–4 ahead of Willie Thorne after their first session, but then lost six successive frames as Thorne progressed 10–5. Stephen Hendry built a 4–0 lead over Gary Wilkinson, and led 6–3 as the second session commenced, but after missing several short-length pots during the match, won only in the deciding frame, 10–9.

Third seed Neal Foulds lost 9–10 to Wayne Jones, at the end of a season that saw Foulds fall from third to twentieth place in the rankings. Peter Francisco held a 7–4 lead over Dean Reynolds but lost 7–10. Meo led the 1987 champion Joe Johnson 8–0 before winning the match 10–5. Eddie Charlton defeated Cliff Thorburn 10–9 in a match that finished at 2:39 am, which was the second-latest finish time for a match at the Crucible. Charlton, aged 59 years and 169 days, became the second-oldest player to win a match at the World Championship, after Fred Davis in 1979.

After constructing breaks of 110, 103 and 102, John Parrott led James 9–7. In each of the next two frames, he missed pots on the black that would have won him the match, James taking both frames. The deciding frame was won by Parrott, who compiled a break of 33. Parrott, from Liverpool, wore a black armband during the match in recognition of the Hillsborough disaster that had happened on 15 April at the FA Cup semi-final between Nottingham Forest and Liverpool. Dennis Taylor led Hughes 6–3 after their first session, and in the second session won four consecutive frames including breaks of 106 and 94, to qualify for the next round 10–3. John Virgo progressed to the second round for the first time since 1982 by eliminating Darren Morgan 10–4. Second seed Jimmy White defeated Dene O'Kane, who recorded a 127 break, 10–7.

=== Second round ===
The second round, which took place between 20 and 24 April, was played as best-of-25-frames matches spread over three sessions. Davis defeated Duggan within two sessions, going from a 7–1 lead after the first to a 13–3 victory in the second. Hallett won in the deciding frame against Roe. Griffiths and Silvino Francisco were 3–3 at the end of their first session, after which Griffiths obtained a 10–6 lead during the second session, and eliminated Francisco 13–9. Thorne took a 2–0 lead against Hendry, but was eventually defeated 4–13.

Jones lost 3–13 to Reynolds. Meo was warned by the referee for slow play during the 21st frame against Charlton. This turned out to be the last frame, as Meo won the contest 13–8. Parrott won four consecutive frames to go from 9–10 behind Taylor to win 13–10. The match between White and Virgo saw White take a 5–3 lead from the first session, and went to a deciding frame during which Virgo, leading by two points in the frame, announced that he had committed a foul by slightly touching a red ball with his cue. White went on to win the frame and match.

The afternoon session on 22 April, featuring the matches between Parrott and Taylor, and Griffiths and Francisco, had its start time delayed from 3:00 pm until 3:06 pm, commencing with a minute's silence in acknowledgement of the Hillsborough disaster a week earlier. There was no television coverage of matches on 24 April due to strike action by the Broadcasting and Entertainment Trades Alliance and the National Union of Journalists relating to a pay dispute.

=== Quarter-finals ===
The quarter-finals were played as best-of-25-frames matches over three sessions on 25 and 26 April. As in the previous round, Davis won his match before the final session was required. Davis compiled a 128 break in the second frame as he built a 7–0 lead, before Hallett took the last frame of the first session. The first four frames of the second session were won by Davis, putting him 11–1 ahead. Hallett compiled a 133 break when 2–12 behind, but lost the match 3–13. Griffiths and Hendry were level at 4–4 at the conclusion of their first session. Hendry won nine successive frames to progress 13–5, constructing a 141 break in the thirteenth frame of the match.

Reynolds, who had criticised Meo for the slow pace of his play during the 1989 British Open final between the pair in March, was warned by referee John Williams for slow play. Meo won the match 13–9, having held leads of 4–3 and 9–7 after the first two sessions. At the post-match press conference, Reynolds started crying during his opening sentence, and, a few minutes later, expressed his dissatisfaction with the referee's decisions during the match. Making several mistakes, White trailed Parrott 1–7 after their first session, but recovered to 6–8, and finished the second day 6–10 behind. Parrott won three of the first four frames on the third day to complete a 13–7 win.

=== Semi-finals ===
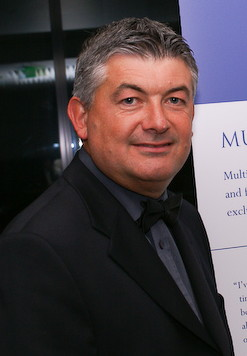
John Parrott (pictured in 2008) defeated Tony Meo to reach the final.

The semi-finals took place between 27 and 29 April as best-of-31-frames matches played over four sessions. After trailing Davis 2–5 and 4–10 at the end of their first two sessions, Hendry reduced his arrears to 6–10, and compiled a 68 break to lead by 51 in the 17th frame. Davis then forced a re-spotted black by compiling a 51 break consisting of the three remaining red balls, each followed by a black ball, and the colours, and went on to win the frame. Hendry won three of the next four frames, making a break of 139 in the 20th frame. Davis took a 13–9 lead by prevailing 67–59 in the last frame of the third session. In the final session, Hendry scored only eight points across three frames, while Davis made breaks of 63, 71, 54 and 40 to wrap up a 16–9 victory.

Meo's highest break in the first session of his match against Parrott was just 28, and he finished that session 2–6 behind, narrowing Parrott's lead to 4–6 by winning the first two frames of the second session. The session finished with Parrott 10–5 ahead. Meo won on the black having needed Parrott to concede penalty points in the 16th frame, then Parrott won the next three frames, the 18th and 19th both being close. The session ended with Meo having made a 112 break but Parrott 15–7 ahead. In the fourth session, Parrott's break of 82 won him the frame, and the match 16–7.

=== Final ===
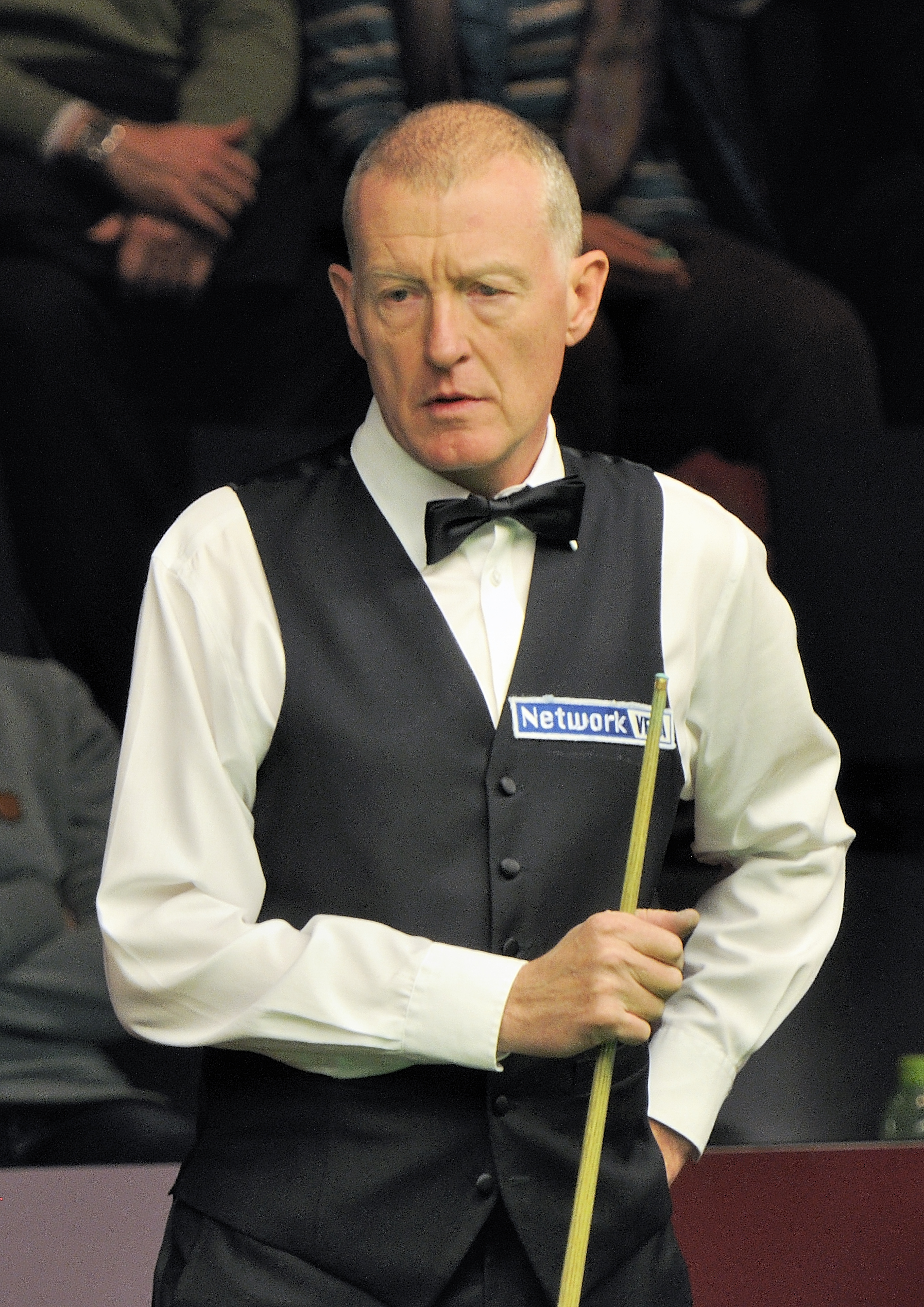
Steve Davis (pictured in 2014) won his sixth world championship title.

The final between Steve Davis and John Parrott took place on 30 April and 1 May. It was a best-of-35-frames match scheduled for four sessions, with John Street as referee. In the afternoon session on the first day, Davis established a 2–0 lead, before Parrott won the third frame. Davis extended his lead to 5–1, Parrott winning the last frame of the first session to leave Davis 5–2 ahead.

Davis increased his advantage to 9–2 by winning the first four frames of the evening session on 30 April, recording breaks of 42, 37, 55 and 112, whilst Parrott potted only six balls, totalling 15 points. Parrott led by 44 points in the twelfth frame after constructing a 52 break, but lost the frame after Davis compiled a 62 break. Parrott went in-off after potting a red in the thirteenth frame, allowing Davis the opportunity to win the frame with a break of 59. In the next frame, Davis missed potting the pink whilst using the rest, and Parrott made it 3–11 with a break of 68. During the last two frames of the first day, Parrott potted only one red as Davis extended his lead to 13–3, including breaks of 80 and 68.

Although Parrott had chances to win both of the first two frames in the third session, Davis won them both on the pink. With breaks of 59 and 38 to add the next two frames, Davis increased his lead to 17–3. Parrott led 40–0 in the 21st frame, before a break of 42 by Davis. Davis won the frame, his 18–3 victory becoming a new record margin of victory in a World Snooker Championship final at the Crucible, surpassing his 18–6 defeat of Thorburn in 1983. It was a third consecutive World Snooker Championship win for Davis, and his sixth title, to equal Reardon's total since the competition was re-launched in 1969. The match ended with a session to spare, and the pair played an exhibition match at the venue in place of the last session.

Parrott said afterwards that "Me not playing anything like, and Steve playing exceptionally well, that's a recipe for 18–3." Davis remarked that "A month before the championship I wasn't playing well enough to beat players like Hendry and Parrott. To actually pull out all the stops and produce the standard of play that I have must rate as one of my greatest achievements. I've played the best snooker of my career." The two players occupied the top places in the 1989/1990 world rankings, calculated based on results from the previous two seasons; Davis retaining first position with 64 points, followed by Parrott on 48. Parrott later won the 1991 World Snooker Championship title, whilst 1989 was the last world final reached by Davis.

In his 1989 book Snooker: Records, Facts and Champions, Ian Morrison wrote "Don't let the scoreline lead you to believe that Parrott did not do justice to the occasion. But simply, no man could have lived with Davis the way he played at the Crucible in 1989." Snooker historian Clive Everton, who played in the qualifying rounds of the tournament, reflected in 2012 that after the 1989 tournament, despite Davis having lost the 1985 and 1986 championship finals, "such was his dominance that it would have been impossible to predict with confidence that [Davis] would never win the title again." Authors Luke Williams and Paul Gadsby claimed that "It is ironic, then, that in the wake of his most dominant World Championship triumph, Davis's career almost immediately headed into decline," and that Davis's losses to Hendry in the finals of the 1989 UK Championship and the 1990 UK Championship "symbolised a monumental power shift in the game."

== Main draw ==
Shown below are the results for the tournament. The numbers in parentheses beside some of the players are their seeding ranks (each championship has 16 seeds and 16 qualifiers). Players in bold are match winners.

**First round** Best of 19 frames
15 April
**Steve Davis (ENG) (1)**	**10**
Steve Newbury (WAL)	5
15 & 16 April
Cliff Wilson (WAL) (16)	1
**Steve Duggan (ENG)**	**10**
16 & 17 April
**Mike Hallett (ENG) (9)**	**10**
Doug Mountjoy (WAL)	7
16 & 17 April
Tony Knowles (ENG) (8)	6
**David Roe (ENG)**	**10**
17 & 18 April
**Terry Griffiths (WAL) (5)**	**10**
Bob Chaperon (CAN)	6
18 & 19 April
**Silvino Francisco (RSA) (12)**	**10**
Joe O'Boye (IRL)	6
18 & 19 April
**Willie Thorne (ENG) (13)**	**10**
Paddy Browne (IRL)	5
19 & 20 April
**Stephen Hendry (SCO) (4)**	**10**
Gary Wilkinson (ENG)	9
19 & 20 April
Neal Foulds (ENG) (3)	9
**Wayne Jones (WAL)**	**10**
19 April
Peter Francisco (RSA) (14)	7
**Dean Reynolds (ENG)**	**10**
18 April
Joe Johnson (ENG) (11)	5
**Tony Meo (ENG)**	**10**
17 & 18 April
Cliff Thorburn (CAN) (6)	9
**Eddie Charlton (AUS)**	**10**
16 & 17 April
**John Parrott (ENG) (7)**	**10**
Steve James (ENG)	9
16 & 17 April
**Dennis Taylor (NIR) (10)**	**10**
Eugene Hughes (IRL)	3
15 & 16 April
**John Virgo (ENG) (15)**	**10**
Darren Morgan (WAL)	4
15 April
**Jimmy White (ENG) (2)**	**10**
Dene O'Kane (NZL)	7

**Second round** Best of 25 frames
20 & 21 April
(England) **Steve Davis (1)**	**13**
(England) Steve Duggan	3
21 & 22 April
(England) **Mike Hallett (9)**	**13**
(England) David Roe	12
22, 23 & 24 April
(Wales) **Terry Griffiths (5)**	**13**
(South Africa) Silvino Francisco (12)	9
23 & 24 April
(England) Willie Thorne (13)	4
(Scotland) **Stephen Hendry (4)**	**13**
23 & 24 April
(Wales) Wayne Jones	3
(England) **Dean Reynolds**	**13**
22, 23 & 24 April
(England) **Tony Meo**	**13**
(Australia) Eddie Charlton	8
21 & 22 April
(England) **John Parrott (7)**	**13**
(Northern Ireland) Dennis Taylor (10)	10
20, 21 & 22 April
(England) John Virgo (15)	12
(England) **Jimmy White (2)**	**13**

**Quarter-finals**; Best of 25 frames
25 April
(England) **Steve Davis (1)**	**13**
(England) Mike Hallett (9)	3
25 & 26 April
(Wales) Terry Griffiths (5)	5
(Scotland) **Stephen Hendry (4)**	**13**
25 & 26 April
(England) Dean Reynolds	9
(England) **Tony Meo**	**13**
25 & 26 April
(England) **John Parrott (7)**	**13**
(England) Jimmy White (2)	7

**Semi-finals**; Best of 31 frames
27, 28 & 29 April
(England) **Steve Davis (1)**	**16**
(Scotland) Stephen Hendry (4)	9
27, 28 & 29 April
(England) Tony Meo	7
(England) **John Parrott (7)**	**16**

**Final**; Best of 35 frames
30 April & 1 May
(England) **Steve Davis (1)**	**18**
(England) John Parrott (7)	3

Final: (Best of 35 frames) Crucible Theatre, Sheffield, 30 April & 1 May 1989. Referee: John Street
**Steve Davis (1)**; England				**18**–3			John Parrott (7); England			
Session 1: 5–2
Frame	1	2	3	4	5	6	7	8	9	10
Davis	**86**^{†}	**65**^{†} (51)	20	**66**^{†}	**109**^{†}	**78**^{†} (61)	43	N/A	N/A	N/A
Parrott	20	28	**90**^{†}	5	16	11	**72**^{†}	N/A	N/A	N/A
Session 2: 13–3
Frame	1	2	3	4	5	6	7	8	9	10
Davis	**100**^{†}	**72**^{†} (55)	**113**^{†} (112)	**71**^{†}	**74**^{†} (60)	**88**^{†} (59)	32	**115**^{†} (80)	**68**^{†} (68)	N/A
Parrott	6	9	0	0	58 (52)	23	**68**^{†} (68)	0	1	N/A
Session 3: 18–3
Frame	1	2	3	4	5	6	7	8	9	10
Davis	**62**^{†}	**56**^{†}	**71**^{†} (59)	**68**^{†}	**70**^{†}	N/A	N/A	N/A	N/A	N/A
Parrott	47	44	31	6	40	N/A	N/A	N/A	N/A	N/A
Session 4: not required
Frame	1	2	3	4	5	6	7	8	9	10
Davis	N/A	N/A	N/A	N/A	N/A	N/A	N/A	N/A	N/A	N/A
Parrott	N/A	N/A	N/A	N/A	N/A	N/A	N/A	N/A	N/A	N/A
112				Highest break			68			
1				Century breaks			0			
8				50+ breaks			2			
† = Winner of frame

== Qualifying ==
Results from the qualification event are shown below. Players shown in bold denote match winners.

**First qualifying round** Best of 19 frames
Player	Score	Player
**Nick Terry (ENG)**	**10**–0	Maurice Parkin (ENG)
**Craig Edwards (ENG)**	**10**–4	James Giannaros (AUS)
**Mark Rowing (ENG)**	**10**–1	Steve Mizerak (USA)
**Bernard Bennett (ENG)**	**10**–4	Clive Everton (WAL)
**Paul Thornley (CAN)**	**10**–3	Bert Demarco (SCO)
**Tony Wilson (IOM)**	**10**–5	Mannie Francisco (RSA)
**Derek Mienie (RSA)**	**10**–6	Vladimir Potazsnyk (AUS)
**Mark Johnston-Allen (ENG)**	**10**–3	Eddie McLaughlin (SCO)
**Ian Graham (ENG)**	**10**–0	David Greaves (ENG)
**Steve Campbell (ENG)**	w.o.–w.d.	Gerry Watson (CAN)
**Joe Grech (MLT)**	**10**–6	Derek Heaton (ENG)
**Mick Price (ENG)**	w.o.–w.d.	Paddy Morgan (AUS)
**Robert Marshall (ENG)**	**10**–1	Mike Hines (RSA)
**Darren Morgan (WAL)**	**10**–5	Sam Frangie (AUS)

**Second qualifying round** Best of 19 frames
Paul Medati (ENG)	8
**Nick Terry (ENG)**	**10**
Jim Bear (CAN)	7
**Craig Edwards (ENG)**	**10**
John Dunning (ENG)	9
**Mark Rowing (ENG)**	**10**
**Fred Davis (ENG)**	**10**
Bernard Bennett (ENG)	4
Malcolm Bradley (ENG)	7
**Paul Thornley (CAN)**	**10**
**Patsy Fagan (IRL)**	**10**
Geoff Foulds (ENG)	6
Bill Oliver (ENG)	**10**
Jim Rempe (USA)	5
**Paul Watchorn (IRL)**	**10**
Robbie Grace (RSA)	6
**Mario Morra (CAN)**	**10**
Bernie Mikkelsen (CAN)	4
**Matt Gibson (SCO)**	**10**
Mike Darrington (ENG)	0
**Terry Whitthread (ENG)**	**10**
Jim Donnelly (SCO)	7
George Scott (ENG)	4
**Tony Wilson (IOM)**	**10**
**Jim Meadowcroft (ENG)**	**10**
Derek Mienie (RSA)	7
**Steve Meakin (ENG)**	**10**
Tony Kearney (IRL)	3
**Jack Fitzmaurice (ENG)**	**10**
Colin Roscoe (WAL)	9
**Vic Harris (ENG)**	**10**
Mike Watterson (ENG)	5
**Anthony Harris (ENG)**	**10**
Jimmy van Rensberg (RSA)	7
Gino Rigitano (CAN)	3
**Mark Johnston-Allen (ENG)**	**10**
Bob Harris (ENG)	w.d.
**Ian Graham (ENG)**	w.o.
**Martin Smith (ENG)**	**10**
Steve Campbell (ENG)	9
**Jason Smith (ENG)**	**10**
Robby Foldvari (AUS)	4
**Jim Chambers (ENG)**	**10**
Ian Anderson (AUS)	7
Ian Williamson (ENG)	7
**Joe Grech (MLT)**	**10**
**Glen Wilkinson (AUS)**	**10**
Billy Kelly (IRL)	2
**John Rea (SCO)**	**10**
Dennis Hughes (ENG)	3
**Ian Black (SCO)**	**10**
Dessie Sheehan (IRL)	8
Eddie Sinclair (SCO)	9
**Mick Price (ENG)**	**10**
**Brian Rowswell (ENG)**	**10**
Pascal Burke (IRL)	0
**Paul Gibson (ENG)**	**10**
Robert Marshall (ENG)	3
Eric Lawlor (ENG)	2
**Darren Morgan (WAL)**	**10**
**Francois Ellis (RSA)**	**10**
Mark Wildman (ENG)	7
**Alain Robidoux (CAN)**	**10**
Graham Miles (ENG)	8

**Third qualifying round** Best of 19 frames
**Nigel Gilbert (ENG)**	**10**
Nick Terry (ENG)	5
Tony Chappel (WAL)	7
**Craig Edwards (ENG)**	**10**
Warren King (AUS)	7
**Mark Rowing (ENG)**	**10**
Steve Duggan (ENG)	**10**
Fred Davis (ENG)	3
Bill Werbeniuk (CAN)	w.d.
**Paul Thornley (CAN)**	w.o.
**Dave Gilbert (ENG)**	**10**
Patsy Fagan (IRL)	4
**Tommy Murphy (NIR)**	**10**
Bill Oliver (ENG)	8
**David Roe (ENG)**	**10**
Paul Watchorn (IRL)	5
Martin Clark (ENG)	**10**
Mario Morra (CAN)	6
**Dave Martin (ENG)**	**10**
Matt Gibson (SCO)	7
**Danny Fowler (ENG)**	**10**
Terry Whitthread (ENG)	6
**Joe O'Boye (IRL)**	**10**
Tony Wilson (IOM)	8
**Murdo MacLeod (SCO)**	**10**
Jim Meadowcroft (ENG)	9
**Paddy Browne (IRL)**	**10**
Steve Meakin (ENG)	9
**Ray Reardon (WAL)**	**10**
Jack Fitzmaurice (ENG)	5
**Gary Wilkinson (ENG)**	**10**
Vic Harris (ENG)	6
Wayne Jones (WAL)	**10**
Anthony Harris (ENG)	4
**Jim Wych (CAN)**	**10**
Mark Johnston-Allen (ENG)	3
Graham Cripsey (ENG)	2
**Ian Graham (ENG)**	**10**
Jon Wright (ENG)	7
**Martin Smith (ENG)**	**10**
**Tony Jones (ENG)**	**10**
Jason Smith (ENG)	7
**Kirk Stevens (CAN)**	**10**
Jim Chambers (ENG)	8
**Les Dodd (ENG)**	**10**
Joe Grech (MLT)	9
Roger Bales (ENG)	1
**Glen Wilkinson (AUS)**	**10**
Pat Houlihan (ENG)	5
**John Rea (SCO)**	**10**
**Ray Edmonds (ENG)**	**10**
Ian Black (SCO)	3
Mark Bennett (WAL)	9
**Mick Price (ENG)**	**10**
Marcel Gauvreau (CAN)	7
**Brian Rowswell (ENG)**	**10**
**Ken Owers (ENG)**	**10**
Paul Gibson (ENG)	8
John Campbell (AUS)	4
**Darren Morgan (WAL)**	**10**
**Jack McLaughlin (NIR)**	**10**
Francois Ellis (RSA)	9
Mick Fisher (ENG)	2
**Alain Robidoux (CAN)**	**10**

**Fourth qualifying round** Best of 19 frames
**Nigel Gilbert (ENG)**	10
Craig Edwards (ENG)	8
Mark Rowing (ENG)	6
**Steve Duggan (ENG)**	**10**
Paul Thornley (CAN)	4
**Dave Gilbert (ENG)**	**10**
Tommy Murphy (NIR)	7
**David Roe (ENG)**	**10**
**Martin Clark (ENG)**	**10**
Dave Martin (ENG)	2
Danny Fowler (ENG)	6
**Joe O'Boye (IRL)**	**10**
Murdo MacLeod (SCO)	6
**Paddy Browne (IRL)**	**10**
Ray Reardon (WAL)	5
**Gary Wilkinson (ENG)**	**10**
**Wayne Jones (WAL)**	**10**
Jim Wych (CAN)	9
**Ian Graham (ENG)**	**10**
Martin Smith (ENG)	6
**Tony Jones (ENG)**	**10**
Kirk Stevens (CAN)	2
**Les Dodd (ENG)**	**10**
Glen Wilkinson (AUS)	4
**John Rea (SCO)**	**10**
Ray Edmonds (ENG)	7
Mick Price (ENG)	6
**Brian Rowswell (ENG)**	**10**
Ken Owers (ENG)	8
**Darren Morgan (WAL)**	**10**
Jack McLaughlin (NIR)	2
**Alain Robidoux (CAN)**	**10**

**Fifth qualifying round** Best of 19 frames
**Steve Newbury (WAL)**	**10**
Nigel Gilbert (ENG)	7
John Spencer (ENG)	1
**Steve Duggan (ENG)**	**10**
**Doug Mountjoy (WAL)**	**10**
Dave Gilbert (ENG)	7
**Rex Williams (ENG)**	3
David Roe (ENG)	**10**
**Bob Chaperon (CAN)**	**10**
Martin Clark (ENG)	4
Barry West (ENG)	7
**Joe O'Boye (IRL)**	**10**
Steve Longworth (ENG)	0
**Paddy Browne (IRL)**	**10**
Tony Drago (MLT)	9
**Gary Wilkinson (ENG)**	**10**
David Taylor (ENG)	7
**Wayne Jones (WAL)**	**10**
**Dean Reynolds (ENG)**	**10**
Ian Graham (ENG)	5
**Tony Meo (ENG)**	**10**
Tony Jones (ENG)	7
**Eddie Charlton (AUS)**	**10**
Les Dodd (ENG)	6
**Steve James (ENG)**	**10**
John Rea (SCO)	7
**Eugene Hughes (IRL)**	**10**
Brian Rowswell (ENG)	9
Alex Higgins (NIR)	8
**Darren Morgan (WAL)**	**10**
**Dene O'Kane (NZL)**	**10**
Alain Robidoux (CAN)	5

== Century breaks ==
=== Main stage centuries ===
There were 19 century breaks in the 1989 World Snooker Championship. The highest of the event was a 141 break made by Stephen Hendry.

- 141, 139, 103 – Stephen Hendry
- 133, 111 – Mike Hallett
- 128, 124, 112, 106 – Steve Davis
- 127 – Dene O'Kane
- 112, 101 – Tony Meo
- 110, 104, 103, 102 – John Parrott
- 106 – Dennis Taylor
- 104 – Willie Thorne
- 100 – Joe Johnson

=== Qualifying stage centuries ===
There were 28 century breaks in the qualifying stages, the highest of which was a 143 break made by Darren Morgan.

- 143, 113, 108, 101 – Darren Morgan
- 142 – Tony Meo
- 136, 111 – Wayne Jones
- 128 – Malcolm Bradley
- 122 – Nick Terry
- 119 – Mario Morra
- 117 – James Giannaros
- 113 – Robert Marshall
- 112 – Jason Smith
- 111, 100 – Martin Smith
- 107 – Joe O'Boye
- 107 – Geoff Foulds
- 105, 104 – Mick Price
- 103 – Jim Wych
- 102 – Paddy Browne
- 102 – Les Dodd
- 102 – Craig Edwards
- 101 – Gary Wilkinson
- 100 – Jack McLaughlin
- 100 – Francois Ellis
- 100 – Brian Rowswell
