= 1991 World Snooker Championship =

Professional snooker tournament

1991 Embassy World Snooker Championship
Tournament information
- Dates: 20 April – 6 May 1991
- Venue: Crucible Theatre
- City: Sheffield
- Country: England
- Organisation: WPBSA
- Format: Ranking event
- Total prize fund: £750,000
- Winner's share: £135,000
- Highest break: Jimmy White (ENG) (140)

Final
- Champion: John Parrott (ENG)
- Runner-up: Jimmy White (ENG)
- Score: 18–11

The 1991 World Snooker Championship (also referred to as the 1991 Embassy World Snooker Championship for sponsorship reasons) was a professional ranking snooker tournament that took place between 20 April and 6 May 1991 at the Crucible Theatre in Sheffield, England. Organised by the World Professional Billiards and Snooker Association, it was the eighth and final ranking event of the 1990–91 snooker season and the fifteenth consecutive World Snooker Championship to be held at the Crucible, the first tournament at this location having taken place in 1977.

The defending champion was Stephen Hendry, who had defeated Jimmy White 18–12 in the final of the 1990 World Snooker Championship, but he lost in the quarter-finals to Steve James, becoming another champion who was unable to defend his first world title in an example of the "Crucible curse". John Parrott won his only World Championship title by defeating White 18–11 in the final. It was the third time that White had lost in the final after 1984 and 1990. The highest break of the tournament was 140, made by White during his second-round match against Neal Foulds.

A five-round qualifying event for the championship was held at the Preston Guild Hall from 22 March to 1 April to produce 16 players for the main stage, where they met the 16 invited seeded players. The tournament was broadcast in the United Kingdom by the BBC, and was sponsored by the Embassy cigarette company. Parrott received £135,000 from the total prize fund of £750,000.

== Overview ==
The World Snooker Championship is an annual professional snooker tournament organised by the World Professional Billiards and Snooker Association (WPBSA). Founded in the late 19th century by British Army soldiers stationed in India, the cue sport was popular in the British Isles. However, in the modern era, which started in 1969 when the World Championship reverted to a knockout format, it has become increasingly popular worldwide, especially in East and Southeast Asian nations such as China, Hong Kong and Thailand.

Joe Davis won the first World Championship in 1927, hosted by the Billiards Association and Control Council, the final match being held at Camkin's Hall in Birmingham, England. The 1991 championship featured 32 professional players competing in one-on-one snooker matches in a single-elimination format, each round being played over a pre-determined number of frames, and each match divided into two or more sessions containing a set number of frames. These competitors in the main tournament were selected using a combination of the top players in the snooker world rankings and the winners of a pre-tournament qualification stage. The top 16 players in the world rankings automatically qualified for the event, the remaining 16 players coming through the qualification rounds. It was the eighth and final ranking event of the 1990–91 snooker season, and the fifteenth consecutive World Snooker Championship to be held at the Crucible, the first tournament there having taken place in 1977. The defending champion in 1991 was Stephen Hendry, who had defeated Jimmy White 18–12 in the final of the 1990 World Snooker Championship. The tournament was sponsored by cigarette brand Embassy, and was also referred to as the Embassy World Snooker Championship. The tournament was broadcast in the United Kingdom on BBC 2, with around 100 hours of broadcast coverage, which attracted a peak viewing figure of 5.98 million.

=== Prize fund ===
The winner of the event received £135,000 from a total prize fund of £750,000. The breakdown of prize money for this year is shown below:

- Winner: £135,000
- Runner-up: £80,000
- Semi-final: £42,000
- Quarter-final: £20,000
- Last 16: £11,000
- Last 32: £6,000
- Fifth qualifying round losers: £5,000
- Fourth qualifying round losers: £2,750
- Third qualifying round losers: £1,000
- Second qualifying round losers:£500
- Highest break of the main tournament: £12,000
- Highest break of the qualifying rounds: £3,000
- Maximum break: £100,000
- Total: £750,000

== Tournament summary ==
=== Qualifying ===
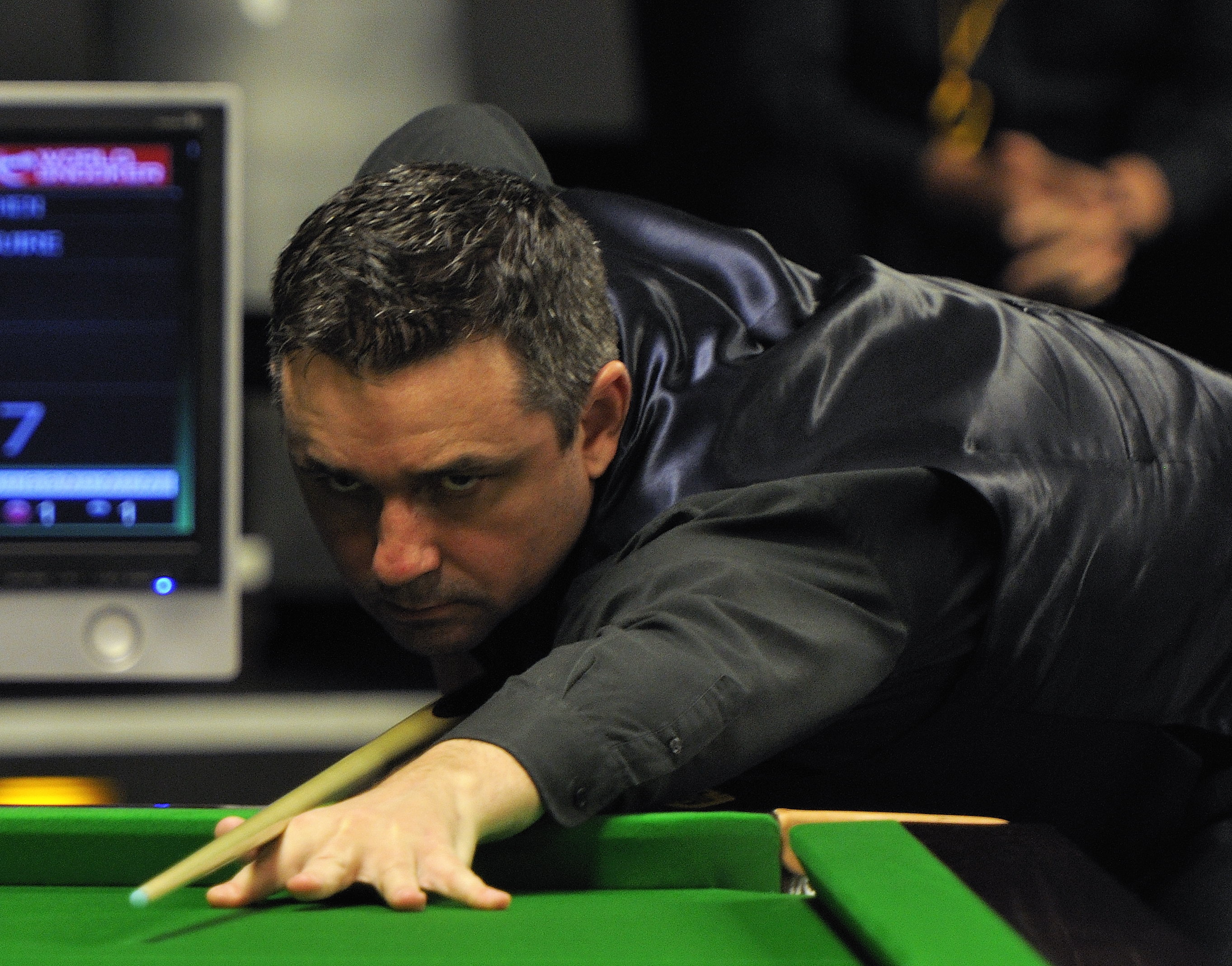
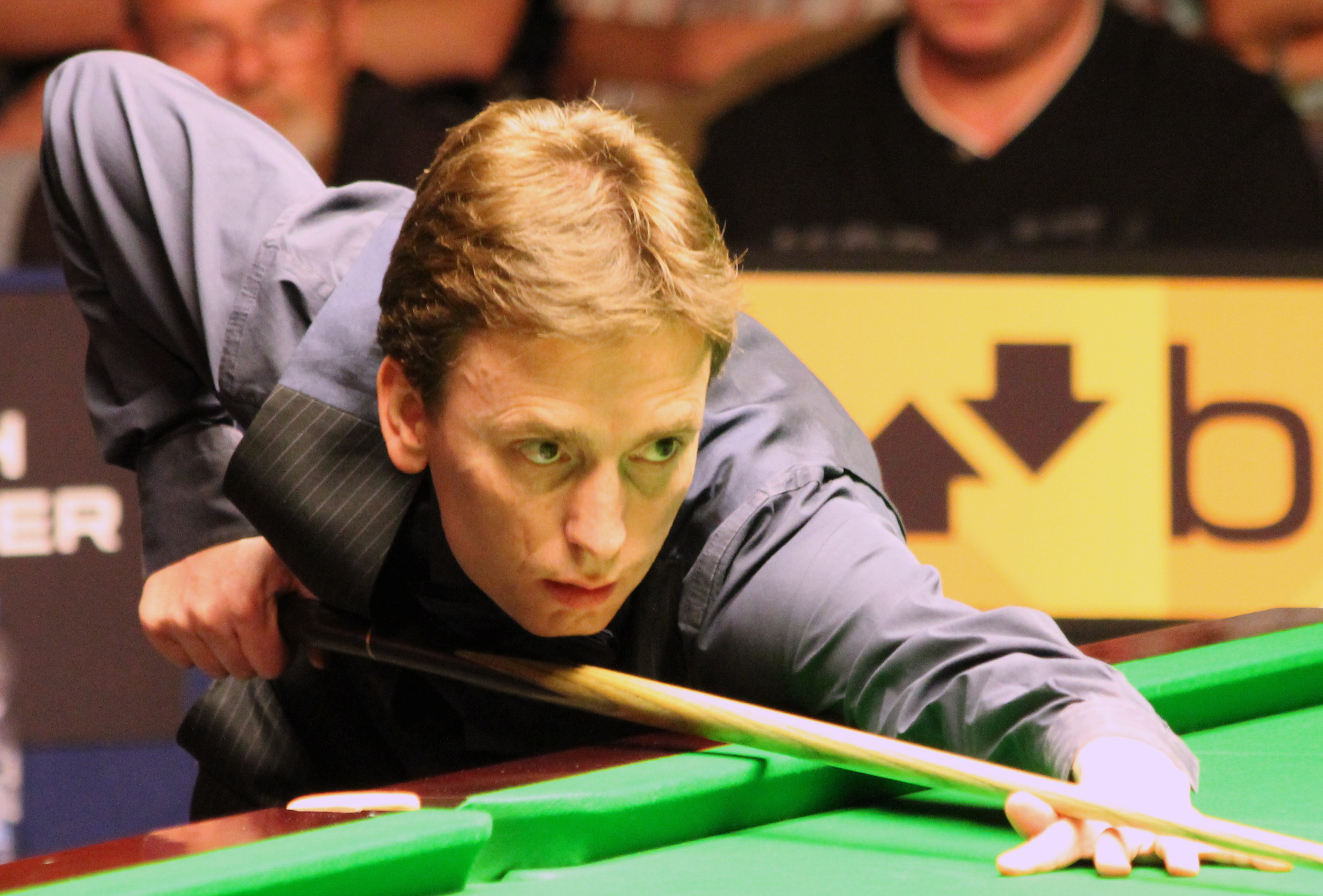
Alan McManus (pictured in 2013) and Ken Doherty (pictured in 2012) both started in the first round of qualifying and progressed to the main event.

The qualifying competition took place at Preston Guild Hall from 22 March to 1 April. Matches were the best-of-19 frames, played over two sessions. Six-time world champion Ray Reardon, who had turned professional in 1967, announced his retirement from the snooker circuit after being defeated 5–10 by Jason Prince in the second round. In the previous round, Prince had eliminated 77-year-old eight-time champion Fred Davis, a professional since 1930, 10–4. In the third round, Ray Edmonds defeated three-time winner John Spencer 10–4. The 1980 champion Cliff Thorburn was beaten 10-5 by Nick Dyson, so failed to qualify for the Crucible for the first time since the tournament moved there in 1977. The only former champion to progress to the main tournament from qualifying was Joe Johnson, who beat Nigel Bond 10–8 in the fifth round.

Derek Mienie, who had travelled from South Africa for his first-round match against Rod Lawler, conceded at 0–5 after his opponent was awarded the firth frame when Mienie was a few minutes late returning from the mid-session interval. Eddie Sinclair led Dyson 8–1 in the third round, but lost 8–10. Seven players from qualifying progressed to the Crucible for the first time, including first-season professionals Alan McManus and Ken Doherty, who had both started in the first round. The others were Dyson, Robert Marshall, Craig Edwards, Ian Graham and Barry Pinches. As Martin Clark was ranked within the top 16, he automatically qualified for his debut match at the Crucible. The highest break of the qualifying competition was 143 by Kirk Stevens in the 12th frame of his match against Jonathan Birch, equalling the record in world championship qualifying set by Darren Morgan in 1989.

=== First round ===
The first round took place between 20 and 25 April, each match played over two sessions as the best of 19 frames. Defending champion Stephen Hendry was the bookmaker's pre-tournament favourite to win the title, priced at odds of 6–4. Jimmy White was second-favourite at 3–1, followed by Steve Davis at 7–2 and John Parrott at 16–1. Hendry compiled a break of 135 in the fourth frame followed by 122 in the fifth frame and established a 6–3 lead against Warren King in their first session. In the tenth frame he had a further century break, 105, and although King won frame 11, Hendry took the next three frames to progress 10–4. Alain Robidoux also held a 6–3 lead after one session, and his 10–5 defeat of Steve Newbury meant that Newbury finished the 1990–91 snooker season without reaching the last 16 stage of any ranking event. Another player to establish a 6–3 first session advantage was Steve James, who went on to win 10–3 against Ian Graham. Dean Reynolds led Robert Marshall 8–5; the pair were later level at 8–8. After winning 10–8, Reynolds said that he had been "timid" in his play because he had recently fitted a new tip to his cue.

In the fourth frame of his match against Doug Mountjoy, Gary Wilkinson potted 15 reds and 15 blacks to make a break of 120. With all six colours on their spots, Wilkinson was on track to complete a maximum break of 147 and win a £100,000 prize for the maximum on top of £12,000 for the highest break, but then missed potting the yellow ball. He went on to lead 7–0 and eventually beat Mountjoy 10–2. Martin Clark, who had only reached the last 16 in one of the previous nine ranking events, defeated Mark Bennett 10–6. The match between Neal Foulds and Eddie Charlton was described as a "slow moving, often almost stagnant contest"; Foulds won 10–7 . Nick Dyson said that he was "steamrollered" in his 3–10 loss to White.

Parrott made a 131 break in the fifth frame against Nigel Gilbert, and later compiled breaks of 95 and 87 as he established a 6–3 first-session lead and went on to win 10–6. John Virgo took a 4–0 lead against Tony Knowles but then lost four of the next five frames. In the second session, Knowles took the first four frames, followed by a three-frame winning run by Virgo, then Knowles adding the next two frames to win 10–8. Alan McManus led Willie Thorne 5–4, and won 10–8. Thorne's defeat meant that he would lose his place in the top 16 of the rankings. Terry Griffiths led Barry Pinches 5–2 and went on to win 10–3. 1991 European Open champion Tony Jones won six successive frames from 4–4 to defeat Mike Hallett. The 1986 champion Joe Johnson qualified for the last time, losing to Dennis Taylor 6–10. Tony Meo defeated Craig Edwards 10–7. Future champion Ken Doherty made his Crucible debut, losing to Davis 8–10 after leading 8–6.

=== Second round ===
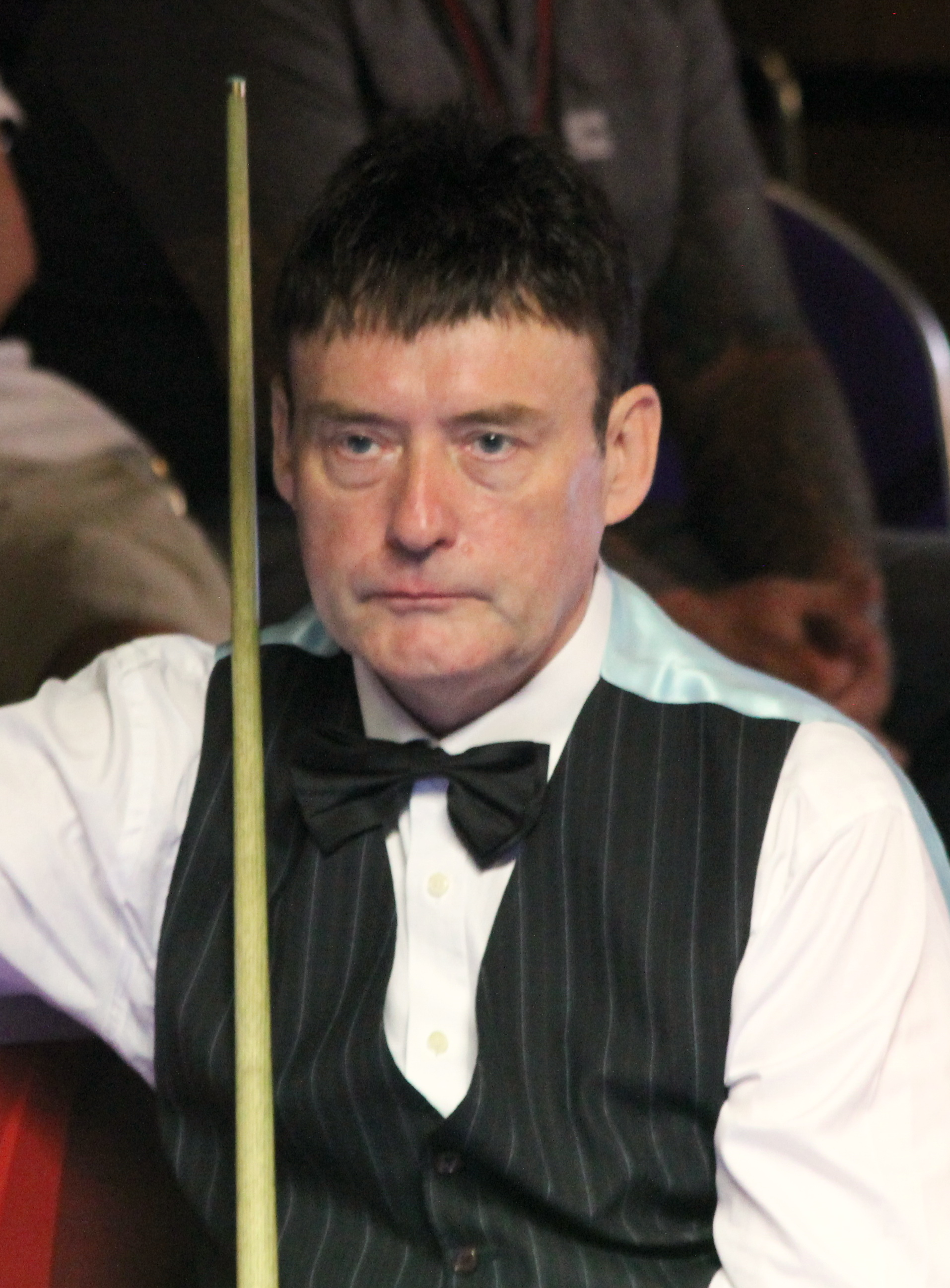
Jimmy White (pictured in 2016) made the highest break of the tournament. He finished as runner-up at the World Snooker Championship for the third time in 1991, having previously reached the final in 1984 and 1990.

The second round, which took place between 25 and 29 April, was played as best-of-25-frames matches spread over three sessions. Hendry won each of the first two sessions 5–3 against Robidoux, and had a break of 102 in frame 12. Robidoux won the first two frames of the final session, but Hendry went on to win 13–8 with a break of 116 in the 21st frame. Having lost the first two frames, Reynolds recovered from over 50 points behind in each of the next two frames to level with James at 2–2. James took a 5–3 lead into the second session, in which Reynolds won four successive frames to lead 7–5. Reynolds finished that session 9–7 up, and later led 11–9 before losing on the deciding frame.

Clark, who played Wilkinson, commented that "I made four breaks over 40 and went 7–1 down. It was unbelievable." With the score at 12–9 to Wilkinson, Clark made a break of 43 but as the frame progressed, Wilkinson was a single point behind with three colours remaining. He potted the blue ball and the cue ball went into baulk to knock the pink away from the black, making the pink pottable; this was voted as "shot of the championship" by BBC TV viewers. Wilkinson took the frame to secure his progress at 13–9. The contest between Foulds and White also went to a deciding frame. White established a 3–0 lead, but the pair were level at 4–4 as the first session concluded. During the second session White made a total clearance of 140, but Foulds held the advantage at 9–7 by the end. White won three consecutive frames from 8–11 behind, and after Foulds had won frame 23, White made breaks of 62 and 69 in frame 24, and 44 and 30 in frame 25, and won. Foulds said afterwards that he had enjoyed the match, and complimented White, saying that "In the balls he is lethal."

Knowles won only the third frame as Parrott's 13–1 victory equalled the biggest margin of victory in a best-of-25 frames match at the Crucible, previously achieved only by two players in 1988. Parrott made a break of 137 in frame six and a 138 in frame 12. Griffiths reached the quarter-finals, as he had each year since 1984, and remarked after his 13–12 defeat of McManus that "I didn't do the job in style but I got it done." A total clearance of 137 by McManus in the sixth frame contribute to him building a 4–3 lead in the first session and two breaks over 50 in frame 8 put him two ahead. Griffiths took the lead at 6–5 with a run of three frames, but McManus was again a frame ahead at the session's end, at 8–7. The players were level at 10–10 and 12–12, with Griffiths winning the deciding frame after a safety shot by McManus left him in a position from which be made a break including the last three reds.

Taylor led Jones 6–2 and 11–5, and won 13–8. It was the first time Taylor had reached the quarter-finals of the world championship since he won the tournament in 1985. The 14th frame of the second-round match between Davis and Meo took over 69 minutes, including over 25 minutes on the final yellow ball; this was a new record for the longest frame at the Crucible. Davis then won the next five frames to win 13–6.

=== Quarter-finals ===
The quarter-finals were played as best-of-25-frames matches over three sessions on 30 April and 1 May. Defending champion Hendry lost to James 11–13, despite having led 11–9. Hendry, who had won seven titles since his world championship victory the previous year, remarked that "I am aware that many people will be relieved to have seen me beaten and the truth is that I was not the most popular champion ever but nor was Davis when he was winning everything." He became the latest player to fail to successfully defend his title at the Crucible, as all champions since the move to the venue in 1977 had in what has become known as the "Crucible curse". He later wrote that, "I was overconfident. Steve James was up against the defending champion and he played to win. So did I – my problem was that I thought I'd won before I'd even got to the table ... Simply, I was outplayed by a guy who raised his game specially." Hendry would not suffer another defeat at the Crucible until the 1997 final against Ken Doherty.

White won 11 frames in a row to go from 0–1 behind to 11–1 in front of Wilkinson. In the 13th frame Wilkinson was on track for a maximum break but missed an attempt to double the last red, so the break finished at 112. White wrapped up the win with a session to spare by compiling a 138 break in frame 16, the 100th century break in major tournaments during his ten-year professional career. From 9–7 ahead of Griffiths, Parrott won 13–10, and declared that he was "ready to take this tournament" helped by a "harder streak" in him than he had previously displayed.

Davis heard from his wife in the early hours of 29 April that she was going into labour two weeks earlier than expected, and he took a taxi the 200 miles to the hospital in Essex where she was; their son was born at around 8:00pm. Davis was then driven back to Sheffield and started his match against Taylor in the afternoon session on 30 April. Taylor won the first two frames, but Davis led 5–3 by the end of the first session. From 7–7, Davis took the next six frames, which meant he reached the semi-finals for the ninth consecutive year.

=== Semi-finals ===
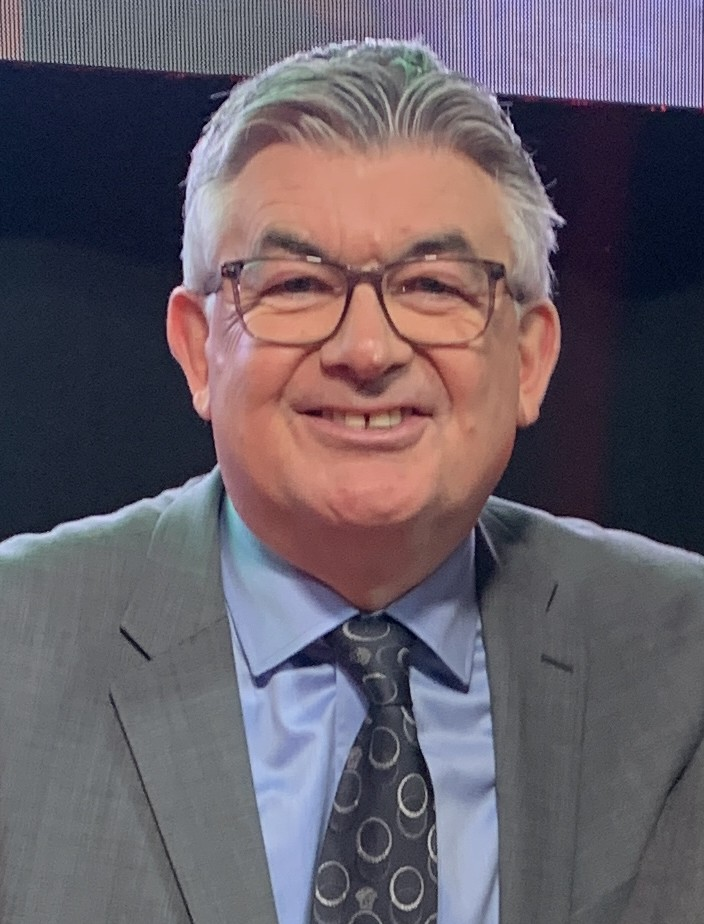
John Parrott (pictured in 2025) won the title.

The semi-finals took place between 2 and 4 May as best-of-31-frames matches played over four sessions. Davis faced Parrott in a repeat of the 1989 final, and won the first frame before Parrott levelled at 1–1. Parrott took a 2–1 led by doubling the respotted black twice the length of the table, before finishing the session 5–2 ahead. He added the first four frames of the second session, and made a 122 break in the last of these. The second session finished with Parrott leading 10–4. Parrott added the first frame of the third session, then Davis won three consecutive frames to narrow his deficit to 7–11. By the end of the session Parrott was 14–8 ahead. He won the match 16–10; Davis failed to score in the last two frames.

The first day of the match between White and James was played on their 29th and 30th birthdays respectively. White led 3–1 and was 5–3 up at the end of the first session. Bob Holmes of The Daily Telegraph described White's performance in the session as "masterly", and noted that the first four frames of the match together were completed more quickly that the first frame in the other semi-final. By the close of the second session White was 9–6 ahead. James had century breaks in the 13th and 15th frames, and then he made a 135 in the first frame of the third session, the third century break across four frames, equalling a Crucible record. From a single frame ahead at 10–9, White went on to win 16–9.

=== Final ===
The final between John Parrott and Jimmy White was played as the best-of-35 frames across four sessions on 5 and 6 May. Everton later wrote that "It is hard to imagine a better first-session performance than the one which gave Parrott a 7–0 lead". He won the first frame with a 97 break, and having made breaks of at least 43 in each of the next five frames, compiled a 117 break in frame seven. During the session he scored a total of 634 points against White's 80. Journalist Terry Smith remarked that many observers, including former champion John Spencer and BBC TV Commentator Ted Lowe, felt that it was "the finest session by one player" they had ever seen. White later wrote that Parrott "played like a god. The first seven frames he played were out of this world."

When they resumed for the second session, White won frames eight and nine, then Parrott won the next. In the 11th frame, a break of 70 by Parrott left White with two snookers required. A foul by Parrott and a free ball potted by White led to the frame being decided on a respotted black; Parrott won that frame, and the next, to lead 10-2. White took the next three frames, then Parrott made a break of 112 in the final frame of the first day to take an overnight lead of 11-5.

The pace and quality of the play on the second day was lower than on the first. Parrott said that he had difficulty sleeping: "It would have been easier to have nailed a blancmange to the ceiling." White claimed frame 17 with a break of 92, and took the next frame on the final black. A clearance of 34 by Parrott after White had missed a pot won frame 19, and White's capture of frame 20 was followed by Parrott taking frames 21 and 22. White's clearance of 67 won frame 23 on the black, and Parrott's break of 52 and 34 in frame 24 meant that Parrott finished the session with a 15-9 advantage.

In the first frame of the fourth session, Parrott made a break of 112, to equal Davis's 1986 record of eight century breaks at a world championship. White took two of the next three frames before Parrott clinched victory at 18–11 with a break of 48. It was the third time that White had lost in the final, after 1984 and 1990.

Hendry wrote that "I have to admit that John Parrott played the best snooker of the tournament and deserved his win". It was Parrott's first win in eight finals in a significant tournament held in the UK, although he had won four tournaments held in other countries. In the 1991–92 snooker world rankings, published after the championship and based on results from 18 tournaments across two years, Parrott dropped from third to fourth, exchanging positions with White, while Hendry and Davis remained first and second respectively.

== Main draw ==
Shown below are the results for each round and the details of the final. The numbers in parentheses are their seeding ranks.

First round Best of 19 frames
20 April
Stephen Hendry (SCO) (1)	10
Warren King (AUS) (39)	4
20 & 21 April
Alain Robidoux (CAN) (16)	10
Steve Newbury (WAL) (20)	5
21 & 22 April
Steve James (ENG) (9)	10
Ian Graham (ENG) (50)	3
24 & 25 April
Dean Reynolds (ENG) (8)	10
Robert Marshall (ENG) (46)	8
22 & 23 April
Doug Mountjoy (WAL) (5)	2
Gary Wilkinson (ENG) (19)	10
23 April
Martin Clark (ENG) (12)	10
Mark Bennett (WAL) (33)	6
21 & 22 April
Neal Foulds (ENG) (13)	10
Eddie Charlton (AUS) (31)	7
24 April
Jimmy White (ENG) (4)	10
Nick Dyson (ENG) (64)	3
23 & 24 April
John Parrott (ENG) (3)	10
Nigel Gilbert (ENG) (51)	6
21 April
John Virgo (ENG) (14)	8
Tony Knowles (ENG) (21)	10
23 & 24 April
Willie Thorne (ENG) (11)	8
Alan McManus (SCO) (-)	10
22 & 23 April
Terry Griffiths (WAL) (6)	10
Barry Pinches (ENG) (62)	3
24 & 25 April
Mike Hallett (ENG) (7)	4
Tony Jones (ENG) (35)	10
22 April
Dennis Taylor (NIR) (10)	10
Joe Johnson (ENG) (17)	6
20 April
Tony Meo (ENG) (15)	10
Craig Edwards (ENG) (61)	7
20 & 21 April
Steve Davis (ENG) (2)	10
Ken Doherty (IRE) (-)	8

Second round Best of 25 frames
25, 26 & 27 April
Stephen Hendry (SCO) (1)	13
Alain Robidoux (CAN) (16)	8
28 & 29 April
Steve James (ENG) (9)	13
Dean Reynolds (ENG) (8)	12
26 & 27 April
Gary Wilkinson (ENG) (19)	13
Martin Clark (ENG) (12)	9
27, 28 & 29 April
Neal Foulds (ENG) (13)	12
Jimmy White (ENG) (4)	13
27 & 28 April
John Parrott (ENG) (3)	13
Tony Knowles (ENG) (21)	1
26 & 27 April
Alan McManus (SCO) (-)	12
Terry Griffiths (WAL) (6)	13
28 & 29 April
Tony Jones (ENG) (35)	8
Dennis Taylor (NIR) (10)	13
25 & 26 April
Tony Meo (ENG) (15)	6
Steve Davis (ENG) (2)	13

Quarter-finals; Best of 25 frames
30 April & 1 May
Stephen Hendry (SCO) (1)	11
Steve James (ENG) (9)	13
30 April
Gary Wilkinson (ENG) (19)	3
Jimmy White (ENG) (4)	13
30 April & 1 May
John Parrott (ENG) (3)	13
Terry Griffiths (WAL) (6)	10
30 April & 1 May
Dennis Taylor (NIR) (10)	7
Steve Davis (ENG) (2)	13

Semi-finals; Best of 31 frames
2, 3 & 4 May
Steve James (ENG) (9)	9
Jimmy White (ENG) (4)	16
2, 3 & 4 May
John Parrott (ENG) (3)	16
Steve Davis (ENG) (2)	10

Final; Best of 35 frames
5 & 6 May
Jimmy White (ENG) (4)	11
John Parrott (ENG) (3)	18

=== Final: frame scores ===
Final: (Best of 35 frames) Crucible Theatre, Sheffield, 5 & 6 May 1991; Referee: John Williams (WAL)
Jimmy White (ENG) (4)				11–18			John Parrott (ENG) (3)			
Session 1: 0–7 (0-–7)
Frame	1	2	3	4	5	6	7	8	9	10
White	0	34	0	24	6	16	0	N/A	N/A	N/A
Parrott	97† (97)	96† (75)	82†	75†	88† (88)	79† (74)	117† (117)	N/A	N/A	N/A
Session 2: 5 –4 (5–11)
Frame	1	2	3	4	5	6	7	8	9	10
White	87†	67†	0	63	28	69†	82† (71)	64† (55)	8	N/A
Parrott	26	32	77†	77† (70)	88† (88)	49	2	6	120† (112)	N/A
Session 3: 4–4 (9–15)
Frame	1	2	3	4	5	6	7	8	9	10
White	136† (92)	70†	50	75†	55	4	68†	8	N/A	N/A
Parrott		60	51†	8	58†	59†	55 (55)	91† (52)	N/A	N/A
Session 4: 2–3 (11–18)
Frame	1	2	3	4	5	6	7	8	9	10
White	8	103† (58)	13	89†	24	N/A	N/A	N/A	N/A	N/A
Parrott	112† (112)	0	74† (59)	42	76†	N/A	N/A	N/A	N/A	N/A
(frame 17) 92				Highest break			117(frame 7)			
0				Century breaks			3			
5				50+ breaks			12			
John Parrott wins the 1991 World Snooker Championship † = Winner of frame

== Qualifying rounds ==
The results from the qualifying rounds are shown below. Players in bold denote match winners.

**First qualifying round** Best of 19 frames
**Rod Lawler (ENG)**	**5 (Note: Mienie conceded the match at 0–5.)**
Derek Mienie (SAF)	0
**Bill Werbeniuk (CAN)**	**w/o**
Clive Everton (WAL)	w/d
**Vladimir Potaznyk (AUS)**	**w/o**
Jim Meadowcroft (ENG)	w/d
**Jonathan Birch (ENG)**	**10**
Pascal Burke (IRL)	4
**Chris Cookson (ENG)**	**10**
Derek Heaton (ENG)	5
**Paul Thornley (CAN)**	**10**
Paddy Morgan (AUS)	7
**Franky Chan (HKG)**	**10**
Ian Black (SCO)	1
**Jason Ferguson (ENG)**	**10**
David Greaves (ENG)	1
**Alan McManus (SCO)**	**10**
Billy Kelly (IRL)	1
**Gary Natale (CAN)**	**10**
Bert Demarco (SCO)	3
**Jason Whittaker (ENG)**	**10**
Bernard Bennett (ENG)	2
**Jason Prince (NIR)**	**10**
Fred Davis (ENG)	4
**Ken Doherty (IRL)**	w/o
Patsy Fagan (IRL)	w/d

**Second qualifying round** Best of 19 frames
**Rod Lawler (ENG)**	**10**
Anthony Harris (ENG)	5
**Jack Fitzmaurice (ENG)**	**10**
Marcel Gauvreau (CAN)	9
**Mick Price (ENG)**	**10**
Bill Werbeniuk (CAN)	1
**Vladimir Potaznyk (AUS)**	**10**
Graham Cripsey (ENG)	4
**Jonathan Birch (ENG)**	**10**
Kirk Stevens (CAN)	4
**Mario Morra (CAN)**	**10**
Vic Harris (ENG)	5
**Tony Wilson (IOM)**	**10**
Dennis Hughes (ENG)	2
**Jon Wright (ENG)**	**10**
Mike Watterson (ENG)	0
**Ian Brumby (ENG)**	**10**
Terry Whitthread (ENG)	4
**Chris Cookson (ENG)**	**10**
Roger Bales (ENG)	1
**John Rea (SCO)**	**10**
Robby Foldvari (AUS)	9
**Jason Smith (ENG)**	**10**
Jim Bear (CAN)	9
**Paul Medati (ENG)**	**10**
Ian Williamson (ENG)	7
**Ray Edmonds (ENG)**	**10**
Paul Thornley (CAN)	3
**Eddie Sinclair (SCO)**	**10**
Malcolm Bradley (ENG)	4
**Nick Terry (ENG)**	**10**
Franky Chan (HKG)	8
**Steve Campbell (ENG)**	**10**
Tony Kearney (IRL)	4
**Dave Gilbert (ENG)**	**10**
Dessie Sheehan (IRL)	3
**Bob Harris (ENG)**	**10**
Mike Darrington (ENG)	5
**Joe Grech (MLT)**	**10**
John Dunning (ENG)	1
**Jason Ferguson (ENG)**	**10**
Pat Houlihan (ENG)	4
**Alan McManus (SCO)**	**10**
Tommy Murphy (NIR)	6
**Steve Meakin (ENG)**	**10**
Graham Miles (ENG)	6
**Barry Pinches (ENG)**	**10**
Jim Donnelly (SCO)	3
**Andrew Cairns (ENG)**	**10**
Gary Natale (CAN)	2
**Paul Gibson (ENG)**	**w/o**
Paul Watchorn (IRL)	w/d
**Jason Whittaker (ENG)**	**10**
Stephen Murphy (IRL)	8
**Bill Oliver (ENG)**	**10**
Duncan Campbell (SCO)	7
**George Scott (ENG)**	**10**
Mick Fisher (ENG)	7
**Jason Prince (NIR)**	**10**
Ray Reardon (WAL)	5
**Ken Doherty (IRL)**	**10**
Martin Smith (ENG)	9
**Ken Owers (ENG)**	**10**
Matt Gibson (SCO)	2

**Third qualifying round** Best of 19 frames
**Rod Lawler (ENG)**	**10**
Brian Rowswell (ENG)	4
**Warren King (AUS)**	**10**
Jack Fitzmaurice (ENG)	3
**Mick Price (ENG)**	**10**
Jack McLaughlin (NIR)	4
**Les Dodd (ENG)**	**10**
Vladimir Potaznyk (AUS)	3
**Ian Graham (ENG)**	**10**
Jonathan Birch (ENG)	7
**Mario Morra (CAN)**	**10**
David Taylor (ENG)	8
**Robert Marshall (ENG)**	**10**
Tony Wilson (IOM)	9
**Mark Johnston-Allen (ENG)**	**10**
Jon Wright (ENG)	0
**Brian Morgan (ENG)**	**10**
Ian Brumby (ENG)	3
**Chris Cookson (ENG)**	**10**
Murdo MacLeod (SCO)	4
**Mark Bennett (WAL)**	**10**
John Rea (SCO)	5
**Jason Smith (ENG)**	**10**
Jim Chambers (ENG)	8
**Darren Morgan (WAL)**	**10**
Paul Medati (ENG)	5
**Ray Edmonds (ENG)**	**10**
John Spencer (ENG)	4
**Nick Dyson (ENG)**	**10**
Eddie Sinclair (SCO)	8
**Mark Rowing (ENG)**	**10**
Nick Terry (ENG)	6
**Nigel Gilbert (ENG)**	**10**
Steve Campbell (ENG)	8
**John Campbell (AUS)**	**10**
Dave Gilbert (ENG)	8
**Bob Harris (ENG)**	**10**
Steve Longworth (ENG)	9
**Jim Wych (CAN)**	**10**
Joe Grech (MLT)	1
**Jason Ferguson (ENG)**	**10**
Tony Chappel (ENG)	9
**Alan McManus (SCO)**	**10**
David Roe (ENG)	6
**Steve Meakin (ENG)**	**w/o**
Joe O'Boye (IRL)	w/d
**Barry Pinches (ENG)**	**10**
Brady Gollan (CAN)	6
**Tony Jones (ENG)**	**10**
Andrew Cairns (ENG)	6
**Steve Duggan (ENG)**	**10**
Paul Gibson (ENG)	7
**Eugene Hughes (IRL)**	**10**
Jason Whittaker (ENG)	6
**Nigel Bond (ENG)**	**10**
Bill Oliver (ENG)	2
**Craig Edwards (ENG)**	**10**
George Scott (ENG)	3
**Jason Prince (NIR)**	**10**
Colin Roscoe (WAL)	9
**Ken Doherty (IRL)**	**10**
Rex Williams (ENG)	4
**Paddy Browne (IRL)**	**10**
Ken Owers (ENG)	6

**Fourth qualifying round** Best of 19 frames
Rod Lawler (ENG)	7
**Warren King (AUS)**	**10**
Mick Price (ENG)	7
**Les Dodd (ENG)**	**10**
**Ian Graham (ENG)**	**10**
Mario Morra (CAN)	7
**Robert Marshall (ENG)**	**10**
Mark Johnston-Allen (ENG)	9
Brian Morgan (ENG)	4
**Chris Cookson (ENG)**	**10**
**Mark Bennett (WAL)**	**10**
Jason Smith (ENG)	6
Darren Morgan (WAL)	7
**Ray Edmonds (ENG)**	**10**
**Nick Dyson (ENG)**	**10**
Mark Rowing (ENG)	3
**Nigel Gilbert (ENG)**	**10**
John Campbell (AUS)	9
Bob Harris (ENG)	7
**Jim Wych (CAN)**	**10**
Jason Ferguson (ENG)	6
**Alan McManus (SCO)**	**10**
Steve Meakin (ENG)	8
**Barry Pinches (ENG)**	**10**
**Tony Jones (ENG)**	**10**
Steve Duggan (ENG)	5
Eugene Hughes (IRL)	5
**Nigel Bond (ENG)**	**10**
**Craig Edwards (ENG)**	**10**
Jason Prince (NIR)	6
**Ken Doherty (IRL)**	**10**
Paddy Browne (IRL)	6

**Fifth qualifying round** Best of 19 frames
**Warren King (AUS)**	**10**
Barry West (ENG)	2
**Steve Newbury (WAL)**	**10**
Les Dodd (ENG)	5
**Ian Graham (ENG)**	**10**
Dene O'Kane (NZL)	7
**Robert Marshall (ENG)**	**10**
Peter Francisco (SAF)	9
**Gary Wilkinson (ENG)**	**10**
Chris Cookson (ENG)	2
**Mark Bennett (WAL)**	**10**
Wayne Jones (WAL)	8
**Eddie Charlton (AUS)**	**10**
Ray Edmonds (ENG)	2
**Nick Dyson (ENG)**	**10**
Cliff Thorburn (CAN)	5
**Nigel Gilbert (ENG)**	**10**
Bob Chaperon (CAN)	8
**Tony Knowles (ENG)**	**10**
Jim Wych (CAN)	2
**Alan McManus (SCO)**	**10**
Tony Drago (MLT)	8
**Barry Pinches (ENG)**	**10**
Danny Fowler (ENG)	5
**Tony Jones (ENG)**	**10**
Silvino Francisco (SAF)	6
**Joe Johnson (ENG)**	**10**
Nigel Bond (ENG)	8
**Craig Edwards (ENG)**	**10**
James Wattana (THA)	8
**Ken Doherty (IRL)**	**10**
Cliff Wilson (WAL)	5

== Century breaks ==
There were 31 century breaks in the main championship. The highest break of the tournament was 140 made by Jimmy White.

- 140, 138, 136, 117, 115 – Jimmy White
- 138, 137, 131, 122, 117, 112, 112, 101 – John Parrott
- 137 – Alan McManus
- 135, 126, 106, 102 – Steve James
- 135, 122, 116, 105, 102, 100 – Stephen Hendry
- 123, 114 – Tony Meo
- 120, 112 – Gary Wilkinson
- 106 – Dean Reynolds
- 103 – Martin Clark
- 102 – Tony Jones
