= 1970 Canadian Professional Snooker Association tournament =

Invitational snooker tournament

Tournament information
- Dates: 30 April – 2 May 1970
- Venue: North York Centennial Centre
- City: Toronto
- Country: Canada
- Organisation: Canadian Professional Snooker Association

Final
- Champion: Fred Davis (ENG)
- Runner-up: Paul Thornley (CAN)
- Score: 4–1

The 1970 Canadian Professional Snooker Association tournament was a snooker tournament played at the North York Centennial Centre, Toronto, from 30 April to 2 May 1970. Fred Davis defeated Paul Thornley 4–1 in the final to win the title.

== Tournament Summary ==
Six Canadian players progressed into the quarter-finals from a qualifying tournament that concluded on 29 April. They joined English players Fred Davis and Rex Williams, who were exempted, in the main event, which was held at the North York Centennial Centre, Toronto. The quarter-finals were played on 30 April, the semi-finals on 1 May, and the final on 2 May.

Matches were the best of seven frames. However, Under the competition rules, if the scores were level at three frames each, the match was decided on a respotted black. This was invoked in the quarter-finals when Davis won the sixth frame to level at 3–3 with Kenny Shea. Shea lost a coin toss, and was asked by Davis to play first. Davis won the match.

Davis recorded breaks of 61 and 52 during the final and defeated Thornley 4–1.

== Main draw ==
Results of the main competition were as follows:

Quarter-finals
Fred Davis (ENG)	3+1
Kenny Shea (CAN)	3
Rex Williams (ENG)	4
Winston McKinlay (CAN)	0
Paul Thornley (CAN)	4
Robert Paquette (CAN)	1
Bill Werbeniuk (CAN)	4
Cliff Thorburn (CAN)	2

Semi-finals
Fred Davis (ENG)	4
Rex Williams (ENG)	2
Paul Thornley (CAN)	4
Bill Werbeniuk (CAN)	2

Final
Fred Davis (ENG)	4
Paul Thornley (CAN)	1
