= Ian Graham (snooker player) =

English snooker player

Personal information
- Born: 17 February 1967 (age 59)

Sport
- Country: England
- Sport: Snooker
- Professional: 1988–1996
- Highest ranking: 42
- Best ranking finish: QF (x2)

Ian Graham (born 17 February 1967) is an English former professional snooker player.

== Career ==
=== Amateur career ===
Graham is from Watford. During the 1986-87 amateur season he finished in the top 8 of the WPBSA Pro-Ticket series. In the subsequent play-off he defeated professional player Clive Everton 10-1.

=== Professional career ===
Graham turned professional in 1988. Playing as a professional, Graham has a run to the last-16 of the 1988 Canadian Masters, including a 5-2 victory over Eddie Charlton, but was denied a first ranking event quarter final being edged out 5-4 by home player, and former World Champion, Cliff Thorburn. He came through matches against Graham Cripsey and Martin Smith to reach the final qualifying round for the 1989 World Snooker Championship, but was defeated 10-5 by Dean Reynolds one match from The Crucible. After the start to his pro career, Graham finished the 1988-1989 season ranked 59th in the world rankings.

==== Ranking event quarter finalist and Crucible debut ====
He reached his first ranking event quarter final at the 1989 Hong Kong Open where he defeated James Wattana, Rex Williams, Tony Jones and Steve James before his run ended with a loss to New Zealand pro Dene O'Kane. For the second consecutive season he reached the final round of qualifying at the Snooker World Championships, but did not make it to The Crucible as he was defeated 10-7 by Tony Drago. He finished his second season as professional with his world ranking having risen to a career high of 51st following the 1989-90 season.

In October 1990, he reached the last-16 of the 1990 Grand Prix with wins over experienced Welsh campaigners, Doug Mountjoy and Cliff Wilson. Graham made his debut at the Crucible Theatre in Sheffield as he reached the last-32 at the 1991 World Snooker Championship, with a win over Dene O'Kane in the final qualifying round, before losing to the ninth seed Steve James 10-3. He finished the 1990–91 season with a career high world ranking of 42.

In October 1991, he reached a second ranking event quarter final at the 1991 Grand Prix where he beat Jimmy White 5-4 before losing to Alan McManus. He defeated former World Champion Dennis Taylor on his way to the last-16 of the 1993 British Open.
