= Carnegie Centennial Centre =

Arena in Toronto, Ontario, Canada

Coordinates: 43.77352°N 79.45023°W

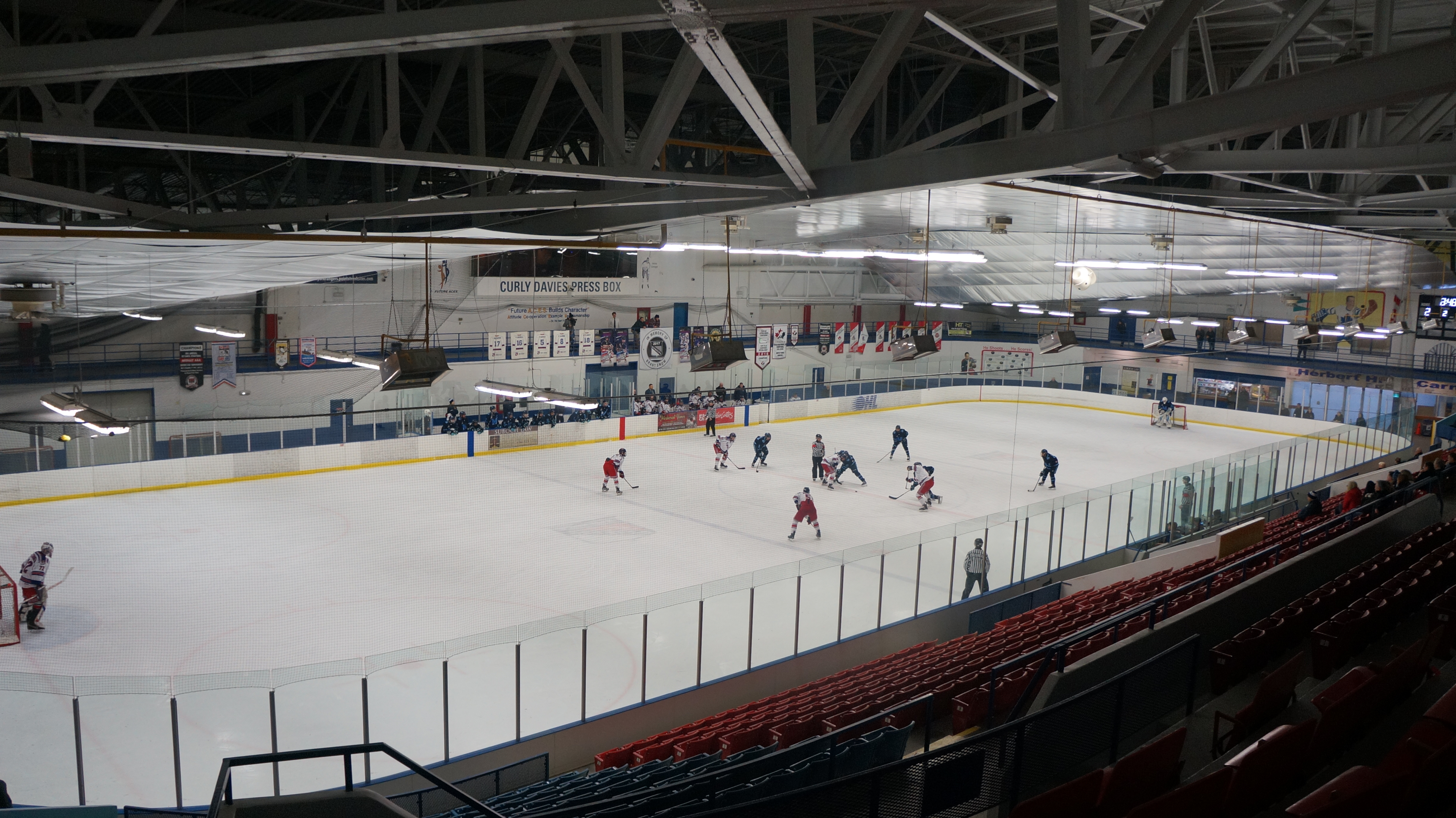
Interior

The Herb Carnegie Centennial Centre, formerly named the North York Centennial Centre, is a multi-purpose arena in Toronto, Ontario, Canada. It was built in 1966 and occasionally hosted the Toronto Marlboros of the Ontario Hockey League. It was renamed on May 2, 2001 for Herb Carnegie, a black Canadian ice hockey pioneer. This arena hosts the North York Rangers of the Ontario Junior Hockey League team. The arena also offers leisure skating organized by the City of Toronto government. It is situated on the north side of Finch Avenue, west of Bathurst Street, in the district of North York. It is located behind the Centennial Library, a branch of Toronto Public Library. During the summer, the arena's ice surface is converted into a dry pad for sports like lacrosse.^{.}

The Toronto Torpedoes played in the Major League Roller Hockey in 1998 at the arena.
