= List of defunct MLRH teams =

This is a list of teams that once played in Major League Roller Hockey but no longer exist. This includes franchises which have relocated to different cities. The years of operation only reflect the time in which that team was in MLRH; it does not take into account any time in which the franchise operated in another league such as Roller Hockey International or the Professional Inline Hockey Association.

- Washington Power, 1997–1998
- New York Riot, 1997–1998
- Columbus Hawks, 1997–1998
- Buffalo Wings, 1997–1998
- Port Huron North Americans, 1997–1998
- Toronto Torpedoes, 1997–1998
- Pennsylvania Posse, 1997–1998
- Orlando Surge, 1997–1998
- Virginia Vultures, 1997–1998
- Tampa Bay Rollin' Thunder, 1997–1998
- South Carolina Fire Ants, 1997–1998
- Carolina Crushers, 1997–1998
- Dallas Hooligans, 2000
- Arlington Arrows, 2000
- Ft. Worth Wranglers, 2000
- Massachusetts Jokers
- Capital Crunch
- Colorado Crush
- Colorado Lightning
- D.C. Voltage
- Denver Devils
- Fairfax Falcons
- Hanford Gamas
- London Lions
- Marple Gladiators
- Mile High Hornets
- New Jersey Bullets
- New Jersey Wolfpac
- New Jersey Scorpions
- New Jersey Riot
- Philadelphia Thunder Cats
- Richmond Starz
- Rockey Mountain Wolverines
- Salt Lake Fire
- Williamsburg Warriors
- Carolina Knights
- Hartford Thunder
- Boston Storm
- Philadelphia Gladiators
- Washington Mad Dogs
- Chicago RollerSnakes, 2005–2010
- Michigan Rebels, 2007
- New York Rockers, 2007
- Philadelphia Sting, 2007
- Ohio Wheelz, 2007
- Maryland Crush, 2007
- Virginia Wings, 2007
- DC Mad Dawgs, 2007
- Charlotte Outlawz, 2007
- Fredericksburg Sabres, 1999–2001
