= Steve Campbell (snooker player) =

English snooker player

Personal information
- Born: 7 March 1966 (age 60)

Sport
- Country: England
- Sport: Snooker
- Professional: 1988–1995
- Highest ranking: 65 (1992/1993)
- Best ranking finish: Last 16 (x1)

Steve Campbell (born 7 March 1966) is an English former professional snooker player.

== Career ==
Campbell turned professional through the 1988 Professional Play-offs, where he won his qualifying match 10–1 against Canadian Paul Thornley.

His first match as a professional was a 4–5 International Open defeat to seventy-five-year-old Fred Davis, but he reached the last 64 at the 1988 Canadian Masters - losing 2–5 to Stephen Hendry - and the same stage of the 1989 Classic, where Cliff Wilson beat him 5–3.

The following season, Campbell lost 5–0 to Jimmy White in the Grand Prix, but came within one round of qualifying for the main stages of the World Championship, at the Crucible Theatre, for the first time. He beat Glen Wilkinson of Australia 10–2, Steve Longworth 10–6 and Les Dodd 10–7, but lost 7–10 to Neal Foulds in the last 48.

Campbell recorded his first run to the last 32 at a ranking event in 1990, at the Asian Open; there, he beat Gary Natale, Jim Chambers and Gary Wilkinson before losing 1–5 to Mike Hallett. He bettered this with a last-16 finish in the 1992 edition, where he overcame Jason Ferguson, John Campbell, Wilkinson and Stuart Reardon, but lost 2–5 to Dene O'Kane.

Having reached a career-high ranking of 65th for the 1992/1993 season, Campbell's form dipped sharply thereafter; his most profitable performance was a last-64 finish at the 1993 UK Championship, where David Roe defeated him 9–6.

Following a 3–5 loss to Malaysian Sam Chong in the 1995 British Open, Campbell did not enter that year's World Championship. Having begun 1994/1995 ranked 106th, he was relegated from the tour at its conclusion, aged 29.
