= Paul Thornley (snooker player) =

Canadian snooker player

Personal information
- Born: 15 April 1944 (age 82) Winnipeg, Manitoba, Canada

Sport
- Country: Canada
- Sport: Snooker
- Professional: 1979–1991, 1994–1996
- Highest ranking: 97 (1985–1987)

Paul Thornley (born 15 April 1944) is a Canadian former professional snooker player.

== Career ==
An article about Thornley in Snooker Scene magazine in 1989 commented that: "In the last sixties, Thornley was the best player in Canada but, out of respect and personal friendship, would not challenge the venerable George Chenier for the Canadian title." Unable to make a living from snooker in Canada, Thornley travelled to the United States to play pool for money.

Thornley defeated Robert Paquette and Bill Werbeniuk to reach the final of the 1970 Canadian Professional Snooker Association tournament, where he was defeated 1–4 by Fred Davis. After not playing for a year, and having his cue stick stolen, Thornley returned to playing cue sports in 1977.

At the 1978 Canadian Open, where he defeated John Pulman 9–6 in his first match, but lost his next – in the quarter-finals – to Cliff Thorburn.

He turned professional in 1979, playing in three tournaments during the 1979/1980 season; in the Canadian Open, he lost to Bill Werbeniuk in the last 16, but having won two matches to progress to that stage, he did not win another, as Jim Wych eliminated him from the Canadian Professional Championship 9–2, and his 1980 World Championship campaign ended immediately, with a 4–9 loss to Australian Paddy Morgan.

Thornley played only one match in the ensuing three years – in the 1980 Canadian Open – but following his hiatus, he returned to compete in the 1984 World Championship. There, he was drawn against Mick Fisher, but having led 5–4, he could not prevent an 8–10 loss to the Englishman.

The 1984/1985 season heralded no progress for Thornley, but in the next, he defeated Derek Mienie of South Africa 10–3 in qualifying for the 1986 World Championship, following this with a 10–7 victory over Patsy Fagan, to reach the last 64. He lost this match 3–10 to Northern Ireland's Tommy Murphy, but earned £1,200 for his effort, and finished the season with a ranking position for the first time, at 97th.

Thornley's qualifying campaign for the next year's tournament began and ended with a defeat to David Greaves in the first round; he defeated Vic Harris 5–4 in the 1988 British Open, having trailed 1–4, but lost his next match 1–5 to Wych.

He again reached the last 64 of the World Championship in 1989, benefiting from Werbeniuk's withdrawal, but again lost at this stage, 4–10 to Dave Gilbert. The following season, he entered all ten ranking events, but lost his first match in each; Thornley's 1989/1990 season concluded with a 10–0 whitewash by Robert Marshall in the World Championship.

After his loss to Marshall and several matches in the 1990/1991 season, Thornley did not play again until the 1995 edition of the tournament; there, he lost 1–5 to Stephen Kershaw. By this time, he had fallen to 520th in the world rankings, and did not play again before being relegated from the tour in 1996.
