= Robert Marshall (snooker player) =

English snooker player

Personal information
- Born: 25 August 1964 (age 62)

Sport
- Country: England
- Sport: Snooker
- Professional: 1987–1996
- Highest ranking: 46 (1990–1992)
- Best ranking finish: Semi-final (x1)

Robert Marshall (born 25 August 1964) is an English former professional snooker player.

== Career ==
Marshall reached the last 32 at the non-ranking 1987 English Professional Championship, recording victories over Bill Oliver, 6–3 at the last-64 stage, and 6–4 against Pat Houlihan. In his last-32 match, Marshall in turn led Willie Thorne 3–1, but lost 3–6. After winning his first professional play-off match against Darren Clarke 10–5, he finished the season ranked 119th.

Marshall's second season on tour saw runs to the last 64 at the 1989 Classic and the last 32 at that year's British Open. In the former, he overcame Ian Black 5–0 and Ray Edmonds 5–2 before losing 1–5 to Tony Drago; the latter featured wins over Jim Chambers, Kirk Stevens and Bob Chaperon, but ended with a 1–5 defeat to Thorne.

At the 1989 International Open, Marshall reached the last-16 stage, defeating Paul Watchorn, Colin Roscoe, Dean Reynolds and Eddie Charlton before exiting 3–5 to Welshman Cliff Wilson. He registered the best performance of his career at the 1990 British Open, where his opponents en route to the semi-final included Nigel Gilbert, David Roe, Joe Johnson, Eugene Hughes and Steve Newbury. He lost 5–9 to Chaperon, the eventual champion.

Ranked at a career-best 46th for the 1990/1991 season, Marshall defeated Tony Wilson of the Isle of Man, fellow Englishman Mark Johnston-Allen and South African Peter Francisco - all 10–9 - to qualify for the main stages of the 1991 World Championship, his first appearance at the Crucible Theatre. In his last-32 match against Reynolds, he lost 8–10.

Marshall began 1992/1993 ranked 70th. By 1994, he had fallen further; although he won five matches to reach the last 64 at the 1995 Thailand Open - where he lost 2–5 to Jason Wallace - he concluded the season having slipped to 162nd. He was relegated from the tour in 1996, aged 31.

After seventeen years out of the competitive game, Marshall entered Event 3 of the 2013 European Tour as an amateur, but lost his pre-qualifying match 3–4 to Oliver Brown.
