= David Greaves =

English snooker player (1946–2019)

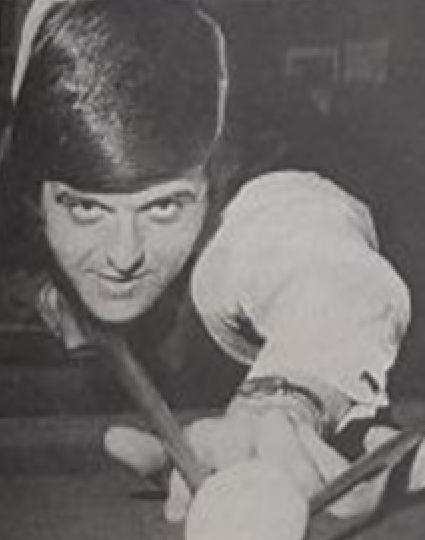
- Greaves in 1971

Personal information
- Born: 1 September 1946
- Died: 5 October 2019 (aged 73)

Sport
- Country: England
- Sport: Snooker
- Professional: 1972–1993
- Highest ranking: 31 (1980–1982)
- Best ranking finish: Last 32 (x1)

David Greaves (1 September 1946 – 5 October 2019) was an English professional snooker player.

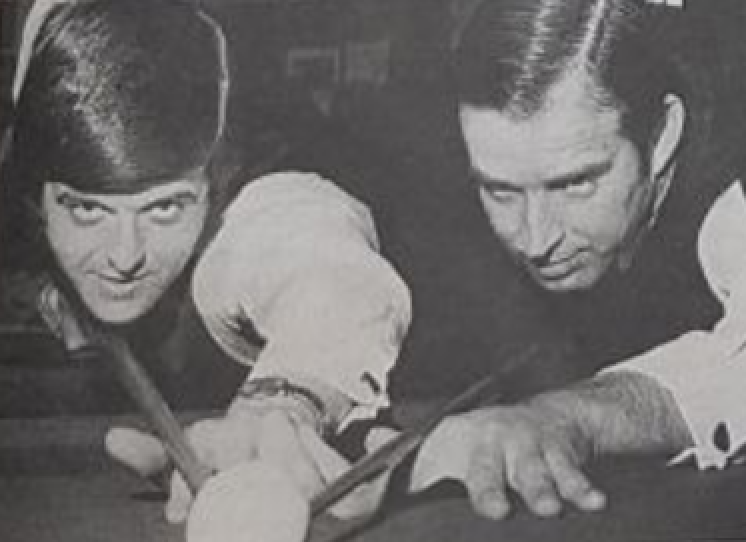
Greaves with world champion John Spencer at the Commonwealth Club in 1971

== Life ==
David Greaves was born on 1 September 1946 in St-Annes-on-Sea (Lancashire). He went to Stanley Junior School in Cleveleys, and then to senior school in Fleetwood. He studied Quantity Surveying at Blackpool Technical College.

Throughout his early life he dedicated much time to practicing and playing snooker and after college he succeeded in joining the ranks of the professionals.

In April 1977 he founded the Commonwealth Sporting Club; it was opened by Joe Davis. The Commonwealth was the kick-start for a new breed of snooker clubs. It was the brainchild of local snooker professional David Greaves who wanted to offer an alternative to the clubs in that era that were typically dark and dingy affairs - manifesting the image of a misspent youth.

It boasted 25 full-size snooker tables including a snooker arena which was the jewel in the Commonwealth's crown. With a capacity for over 200 spectators, Table 1 staged exhibitions, challenge matches and major finals. The Commonwealth quickly became the haunt of the biggest snooker stars of the day. Three-time World Champion John Spencer, who was a family friend of the Greaves, was a familiar face. Canadian Cliff Thorburn, who won the 1980 World Championship, could be seen practising on notorious Table 4 (with the tightest pockets in the club) whenever he was in town.

It hosted the English Amateur final which, in amateur terms, was second in prestige to only the World Amateur Championship. In the time when the professional circuit was somewhat of a closed shop, the English Amateur winner was automatically granted professional status thus adding to the kudos of the event.

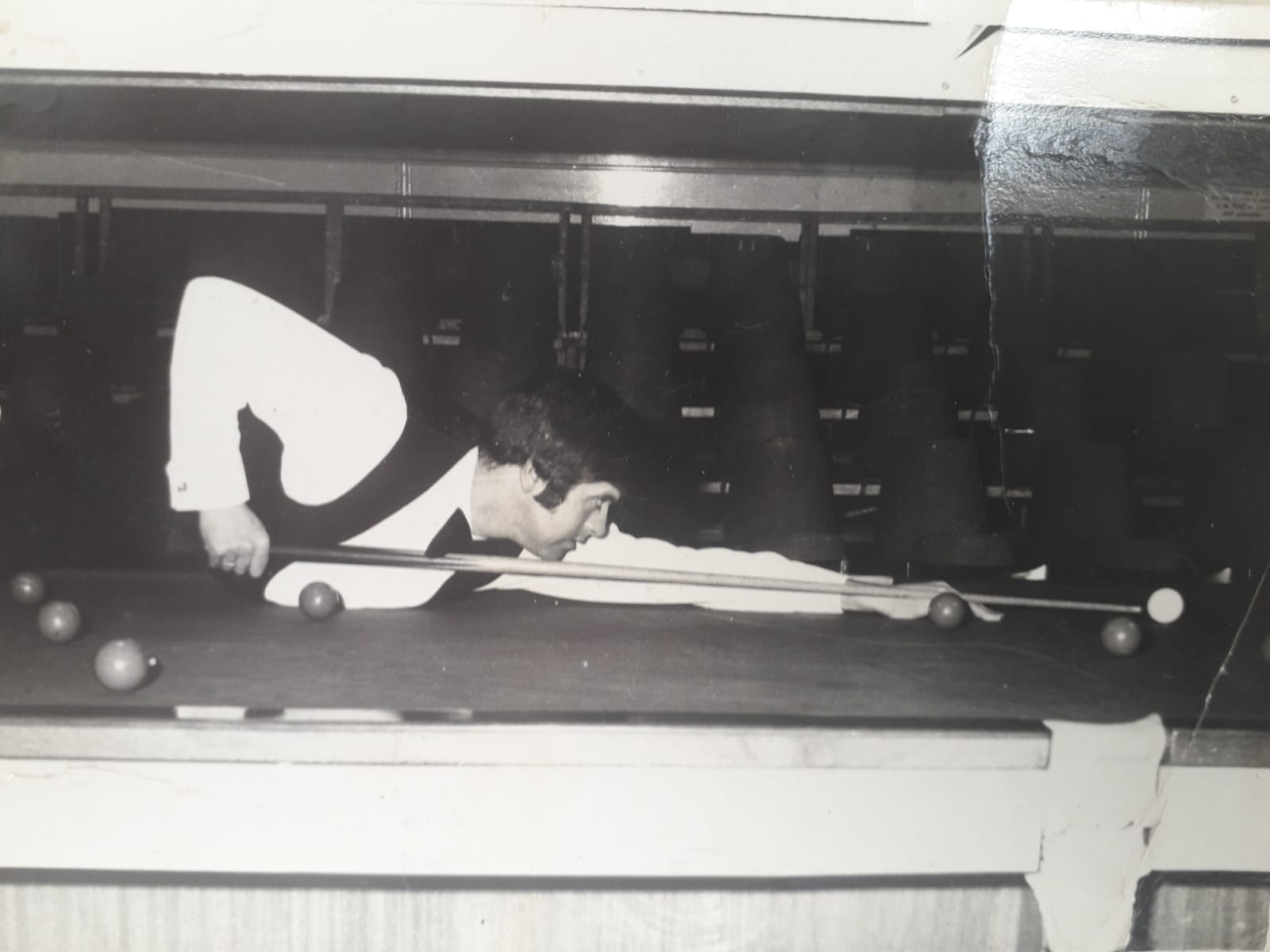
David Greaves

== Career ==
Greaves turned professional in 1972, at the age of 25, playing his first match against Bernard Bennett in the 1973 World Championship. Having trailed 1–5 and 2–7, Greaves recovered to defeat Bennett 9–8; however, he faced Fred Davis in the last 16 and lost the first ten frames, eventually succumbing 1–16 to the eight-time World Champion.

Greaves' attempts to qualify for the next seven World Championships were unsuccessful, the most notable defeat being an 11–0 whitewash by David Taylor in 1977, but in 1981 he was able to overcome Maurice Parkin 9–5 in a preliminary match. He was then drawn against Willie Thorne for a place at the Crucible Theatre but lost 3–9.

In subsequent years Greaves was whitewashed twice more: 10–0 by Ray Edmonds in 1984, losing by the same scoreline in 1989 to Ian Graham.

Greaves' performances in the few other ranking tournaments he entered were often without any reward; of the 61 opening matches he played in any event, he won only ten. A run to the last 32 of the English Professional Championship, a non-ranking tournament, in 1988 earned him £563, the largest prize of his career.

Having fallen to 157th in the world rankings, Greaves was relegated from the tour in 1993.

David Greaves died in Blackpool Victoria Hospital after a short illness on 5 October 2019 aged 73.

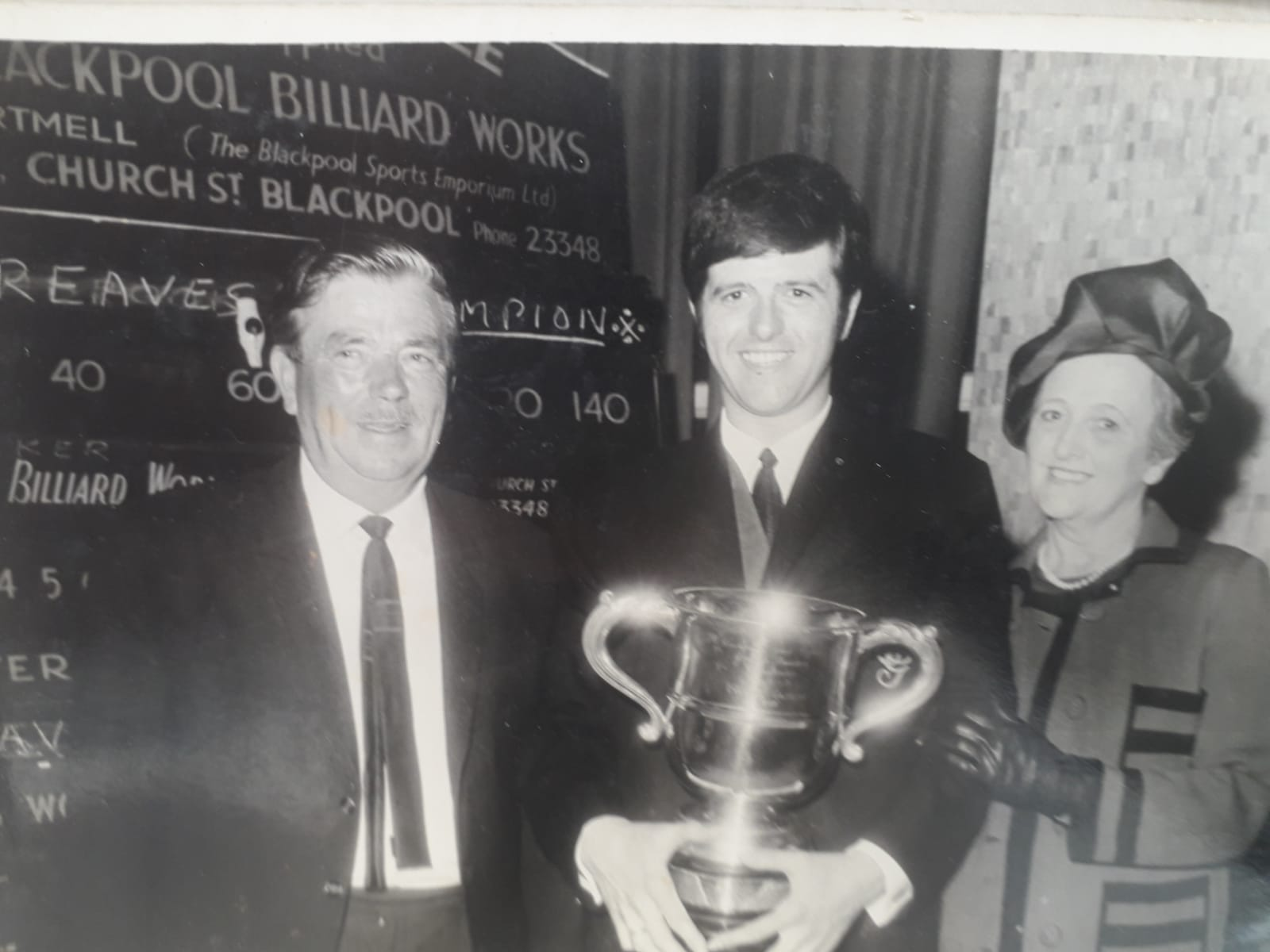
Greaves with his parents after winning the Blackpool Billiard Works Tournament
