= 1932 World Snooker Championship =

Professional snooker tournament

Tournament information
- Dates: 14–30 April 1932
- Final venue: Thurston's Hall
- Final city: London
- Country: England
- Organisation: BACC
- Highest break: Joe Davis (ENG) (99)

Final
- Champion: Joe Davis (ENG)
- Runner-up: Clark McConachy (NZL)
- Score: 30–19

The 1932 World Snooker Championship, known at the time as the Professional Championship of Snooker, was a professional snooker tournament that took place from 14 to 20 April 1932, with the final being held at Thurston's Hall in London, England. It is recognised as the sixth edition of the World Snooker Championship. The defending champion, Joe Davis from England, won the title for the sixth time by defeating New Zealander Clark McConachy by 30 frames to 19 in the final. The score when Davis achieved a winning margin was 25–18, with dead frames played afterwards. Davis set a new Championship record break of 99 in the 36th frame of the final. McConachy had become the first player from outside the British Isles to enter the championship. The only other participant was Tom Dennis, who was defeated 11–13 by McConachy in the semi-final at Skegness.

== Background ==
The World Snooker Championship is a professional tournament and the official world championship of the game of snooker. The sport was developed in the late 19th century by British Army soldiers stationed in India. Professional English billiards player and billiard hall manager Joe Davis noticed the increasing popularity of snooker compared to billiards in the 1920s, and with Birmingham-based billiards equipment manager Bill Camkin, persuaded the Billiards Association and Control Council (BACC) to recognise an official professional snooker championship in the 1926–27 season. In 1927, the final of the first professional championship was held at Camkin's Hall; Davis won the tournament by beating Tom Dennis in the final. The annual competition was not titled the World Championship until 1935, but the 1927 tournament is now referred to as the first World Snooker Championship. Davis also won the title in 1928, 1929, 1930, and 1931, with Dennis runner-up in four of the first five years of the championship, the exception being 1928, when Fred Lawrence lost to Davis in the final.

For the 1932 championship, the preliminary heats and semi-finals were to be best of 25 frames, played over three days, with the final contested over 49 frames across six days. The entry fee was set at five guineas per player (equivalent to £317 in 2025), with a five guineas sidestake required for each match. Entry fees would be used to provide prize money for the finalists, with 60 per cent going to the champion, and gate receipts for each match would be divided equally, after expenses (including 5 per cent of the gross receipts for the BACC), between the two players concerned.

== Summary ==
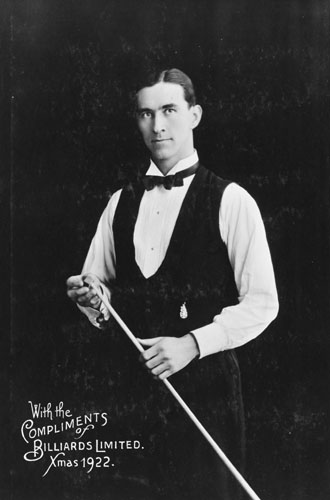
Clark McConachy (pictured in 1922) became the first player from outside the British Isles to enter the championship

By the closing date of 29 February, only three players had entered for the competition: Joe Davis, Tom Dennis and Clark McConachy, who became the first player from outside the British Isles to enter the championship. Dennis and McConachy were drawn to play each other, with the winner meeting Davis in the final. On 26 March, Davis defeated McConachy 25,161–19,259 to retain the Professional Billiards title that he had held since 1928, with those two players being the only entrants. (Note: There was no professional billiards championship in 1931 due to a lack of entrants.)

Semi-final

McConachy and Dennis played their match from 14 to 16 April at Dennis's Billiards Lounge in Skegness, over 25 frames. There were eight frames played each day with four frames in the afternoon and four in the evening (five on the final day). After Dennis had won the first two frames, both sessions on the first day ended level, leaving the score 4–4 overnight after a day that attracted only a small audience. The players were again level after the second day, Dennis winning three of the four frames in the afternoon and McConachy taking all but one of the evening's four frames. McConachy won three of the four frames on the final afternoon to lead 11–9. In frame 19, McConachy made a break of 72 with 9 reds and 9 blacks, winning the frame 92–32. In the evening session Dennis won two of the first three frames to trail 11–12. McConachy made an early break of 47 in the 24th frame and won the frame 93–36 to secure victory at 13–11. A review of the match in The Skegness Standard noted that "only a mere handful of spectators was present at the majority of the six sessions", attributing this to the admission charges of 4s 3d (equivalent to £13 in 2025) and 2s 3d (equivalent to £7 in 2025) being "too high"; the same article commented on the difference in the players' styles, describing McConachy as "rapid and alert in all his movements" and adding that "he fairly ran around the table when a 'good thing' presented itself" in contrast to Dennis's cool and unflustered approach.

Final

The final was played from 25 April to 30 April over 49 frames. There were eight frames played each day, with four frames in the afternoon and four in the evening (and five scheduled for the final afternoon). The match was held at Thurston's Hall, in Leicester Square, London. The first day ended 4–4 with both sessions level. McConachy had the highest break of the day with a 67 in the 8th frame, Davis making a 51 break in the 5th frame. Davis won both sessions 3–1 on the second day to lead 10–6, having made a 57 break in frame 14. On the third day, Davis again won both sessions 3–1 to extend his lead to 16–8, and compiled an 80 break in frame 19. McConachy won the first three frames on the fourth day but Davis took the next four and the day ended with Davis 20–12 ahead. On the fifth day Davis won three frames in the afternoon to lead 23–13, needing just 2 more frames for victory. In frame 36, Davis set another Championship record break. McConachy potted the first red ball, but Davis then had a break of 99 including 12 reds. On 99 he snookered himself and, in attempting to hit a red with the cue ball, committed a fouled by having the cue ball strike the blue instead. An article in The Times reporting on the session stated that "On the evidence of the play, [Davis] is the greatest exponent of the game ever seen." McConachy won all four frames in the evening to reduce Davis's lead to 23–17, making a 51 break in frame 39. Davis won two of the first three frames in the final afternoon session to lead 25–18 and retain the Championship. The remaining six dead frames were played, the two in the afternoon were shared while Davis won all four in the evening. In his 1976 autobiography, Davis wrote that although being defeated by McConachy for the 1932 billiards title had felt like a serious possibility, "snooker was not [McConachy's] strong point and, in the final ... I won comfortably." The championship trophy was presented by Henry Procter, the Member of Parliament for Accrington. Davis had extended his record of winning the championship every year since 1927, with this being his sixth world title.

== Schedule ==
Schedule of matches for the 1932 World Snooker Championship
Match	Dates	Venue, city	Ref
Clark McConachy v Tom Dennis	14–16 April 1932	Billiards Lounge, Skegness	
Joe Davis v Clark McConachy	25–30 April 1932	Thurston's Hall, London	

== Main draw ==
Match results are shown below. Winning players and scores are denoted in bold text.

**Semi-final**; Best of 25 frames		**Final**; Best of 49 frames
		(England) **Joe Davis**	**30**
**Clark McConachy (NZL)**	**13**	(New Zealand) Clark McConachy	19
Tom Dennis (ENG)	11

== Final ==
Final: Best of 49 frames. Thurston's Hall, Leicester Square in London, England, 25–30 April 1932.
**Joe Davis**; England	**30**–19	Clark McConachy; New Zealand
Day 1: **93**–19, 21–**82**, **80**–19, 44–**79**, 54–**66** (Davis 51), **70**–43, **103**–15, 26–**87** (**67**); Day 2: **69**–31, **60**–36, 46–**58**, **101**–36, **99**–16, **98**–36 (**57**), 21–**62**, **53**–46; Day 3: **85**–30, **70**–58, **111**–8 (**80**), 33–**73**, **71**–46, **80**–49, 23–**71**, **92**–30; Day 4: 46–**65**, 21–**83**, 31–**78**, **88**–18, **56**–44, **82**–25, **58**–42, 32–**60**; Day 5: **75**–24, **79**–38, 23–**85**, **119**–8 (**99**), 51–**71**, 19–**63**, 40–**88** (**51**), 62–**74**; Day 6: 46–**56**, **60**–59, **78**–39, **61**–29, 2–**104**, **62**–38, **78**–32, **86**–28, **65**–52
"Dead" frames were played, the final score being 30–19
