= 1933 World Snooker Championship =

Professional snooker tournament

Tournament information
- Dates: 23 March – 16 June 1933
- Final venue: Joe Davis Saloon
- Final city: Chesterfield
- Country: England
- Organisation: BACC
- Highest break: Joe Davis (ENG) (72)

Final
- Champion: Joe Davis (ENG)
- Runner-up: Willie Smith (ENG)
- Score: 25–18

The 1933 World Snooker Championship, known at the time as the Professional Championship of Snooker, was a snooker tournament held between 23 March and 16 June at various venues in England, with the final beginning on 12 June 1933 at Joe Davis's Saloon in Chesterfield, England. It was the seventh edition of the championship, and Joe Davis won his seventh title by defeating Willie Smith by 25 frames to 18 in the final. The highest break of the tournament was 72, compiled by Davis in the fortieth frame of the final.

== Background ==
The World Snooker Championship is a professional tournament and the official world championship of the game of snooker. The sport was developed in the late 19th century by British Army soldiers stationed in India. Professional English billiards player and billiard hall manager Joe Davis noticed the increasing popularity of snooker compared to billiards in the 1920s, and with Birmingham-based billiards equipment manager Bill Camkin, persuaded the Billiards Association and Control Council (BACC) to recognise an official professional snooker championship in the 1926–27 season. In 1927, the final of the first professional snooker championship was held at Camkin's Hall; Davis won the tournament by beating Tom Dennis in the final. The annual competition was not titled the World Championship until 1935, but the 1927 tournament is now referred to as the first World Snooker Championship. Davis also won the title each year from 1928 to 1932, with Dennis runner-up in four of the first six years of the championship, the exceptions being 1928, when Fred Lawrence lost to Davis in the final, and 1932 when Clark McConachy was the defeated finalist.

For the 1933 championship, the preliminary heats and semi-finals were to be best of 25 frames, played over three days, with the final contested over 49 frames across six days. The entry fee was set at five guineas per player (equivalent to £325 in 2025), with a five guineas sidestake required for each match. Entry fees would be used to provide prize money for the finalists, with 60 per cent going to the champion, and gate receipts for each match would be divided equally, after expenses (including 5 per cent of the gross receipts for the BACC), between the two players concerned.

== Summary ==
There were five entries: defending champion Joe Davis, Tom Dennis, and first-time championship participants Walter Donaldson, Willie Leigh, and Willie Smith. Donaldson and Leigh were drawn to play each other in the first round, with the winner meeting Davis in the semi-finals; Smith and Dennis would contest the other semi-final.

Donaldson and Leigh played their first round match at the Lounge Hall, Shakespeare Street, Nottingham from 23 to 25 March. Leigh won the first frame after Donaldson went in-off when potting the final black ball. He added the second after clearing from the brown to the black, then moving into a 4–0 lead. In the evening session, Donaldson took the first frame. He missed the pack of reds when breaking off in the next frame, but still won it. The first day finished with the scores at 4–4, and each player won two frames in the morning session of the second day to make it 6–6. The score was eight frames all after the first two days. It was still level, at 10–10 following the morning session on the third day. In the concluding session, Donaldson opened a two frame lead at 12–10, and, after Leigh had taken the following frame, compiled the highest break of the match, 71, in winning the 24th frame to secure victory at 13–11.

Smith and Dennis played their semi-final at the Burroughes and Watts Hall in Newcastle upon Tyne from 10 to 12 April. Smith moved into a 6–2 lead on the first day, winning both sessions 3–1. On the second day Smith again won both sessions 3–1 to lead 12–4. Smith won the first frame of the third day to achieve a winning margin at 13–4. The remaining dead frames were played and Smith finished 16–9 ahead.

The other semi-final and the final were played at Joe Davis's Saloon in Vicar Lane, Chesterfield. Davis met Donaldson in the semi-final scheduled for 29 to 31 May. Davis took a 3–0 lead before Donaldson won frame 4. Davis then won all four frames in the evening to lead 7–1 with breaks of 54 in frame 7 and 67 in frame 8. Davis continued to dominate and extended his lead to 11–1 in the afternoon. In frame 11 Donaldson had led 60–6 but Davis made a 57 clearance to win the frame. He then claimed the first two frames in the evening to secure victory at 13–1, winning the match a day early. Donaldson won the two dead frames which finished the evening session. In 1939, Donaldson recounted to an interviewer in The Billiard Player that "[Davis] annihilated me. He wiped me right off the table" and that "I saw at once that there was far more in the game than I had ever dreamt of."

The final between Davis and Smith was originally planned for 6 days with 8 frames per day (9 on the final day). Davis won all four afternoon frames on the first day but Smith took three of the four frames played in the evening, to leave Davis 5–3 ahead. On the second day, Smith claimed all four afternoon frames to lead 7–5. At this point it seems that the match was reduced to five days since six frames were played in the evening. Davis won five of these to lead 10–8. He had a break of 53 in frame 14. On the third day Smith won three of the five afternoon frames while each player won three frames in the evening session (which was extended from four to six frames) to leave Davis 15–14 ahead. Davis won three of the five frames on the fourth afternoon to leave the score at 18–16. Davis then won four of the five frames in the evening to extend his lead to 22–17. He had a break of 55 in frame 37. On the final afternoon, Davis made a break of 72 to win frame 40, the highest of the match. He then added the next frame to lead 24–17 and, although Smith took the third frame of the session, Davis won the last frame in the afternoon to take the match 25–18 and win the title for the seventh time. Five dead frames were played in the evening, after which the Mayor of Chesterfield, Arthur Swale, made the presentations. The referee was Mr A Marshall, "the one-arm champion".

== Schedule ==
Schedule of matches for the 1933 World Snooker Championship
Match	Dates	Venue, city
Walter Donaldson v Willie Leigh	23–25 March 1933	Lounge Hall, Nottingham
Willie Smith v Tom Dennis	10–12 April 1933	Burroughes and Watts Hall, Newcastle upon Tyne
Joe Davis v Walter Donaldson	29–31 May 1933	Joe Davis Saloon, Chesterfield
Joe Davis v Willie Smith	12–17 June 1933	Joe Davis Saloon, Chesterfield

== Main draw ==
Match results are shown below. Winning players and scores are denoted in bold text.

**Round 1** Best of 25 frames		**Semi-finals**; Best of 25 frames		**Final**; Best of 49 frames
		(England) **Joe Davis**	**13**
**Walter Donaldson (SCO)**	**13**	(Scotland) Walter Donaldson	1
Willie Leigh (ENG)	11			(England) **Joe Davis**	**25**
				(England) Willie Smith	18
		(England) **Willie Smith**	**13**
		(England) Tom Dennis	4

== Final ==
Final: Best of 49 frames. Joe Davis Saloon, Chesterfield, England, 12–16 June 1933. Referee: A Marshall.
**Joe Davis**; England	**25**–18	Willie Smith; England
Day 1: **52**–34, **46**–44, **103**–23, **81**–31, 25–**72**, 43–**69**, **68**–22, 61–**71**; Day 2: 13–**45**, 38–**53**, 33–**49**, 21–**63**, **78**–19, **70**–15, **116**–15 (**53**), **68**–31, 29–**66**, **66**–22; Day 3: 32–**82**, **81**–10, 30–**62**, **69**–33, 35–**76**, 45–**57**, **90**–25, **86**–33, 25–**56**, 49–**57**, **86**–25; Day 4: **87**–14, 56–**66**, **66**–46, 21–**72**, **74**–61, **79**–31, 54–**75**, **89**–14 (**55**), **72**–18, **79**–11; Day 5: **105**–5 (**72**), **66**–54, 27–**58**, **90**–16
