= List of snooker referees =

This article contains a list of professional snooker referees and indicates those who have officiated at the World Snooker Championship finals. John Williams presided over the most (eleven) finals, nine of those at the Crucible Theatre, including the 1985 final between Dennis Taylor and Steve Davis.

All of the World Snooker Championship finals from the start of what is known as the "modern era" in 1969 are included in the list, with the exception of 1970 and 1971. The referees for these two years are currently not known. Some earlier years have also been included where the information about referees is available.

== Lists of referees ==
=== Current referees ===
Name	World Snooker Championship finals	Ref.
Junaid Ahmed (IND)		
Gergő Almási (HUN)		
Erik Amberg (GER)		
Andrew Barklam (ENG)		
Mark Beale (ENG)		
Julian Bell (ENG)		
Desislava Bozhilova (BUL)	2025	
Terry Camilleri (MLT)		
James Chambers (ENG)		
Kevin Dabrowski (POL)		
Robin Dalgliesh (SCO)		
Nico De Vos (BEL)		
Deng Shihao (CHN)		
Rod Eaton (ENG)		
Marcel Eckardt (GER) (Note: Marcel Eckardt has refereed nine 147 breaks.)	2020	
Sami Erkkilä (FIN)		
Garry Evans (ENG)		
David Ford (ENG)		
Markus Freitag (GER)		
Natalia Gradinari (MDA)		
Nick Harry (ENG)		
Hristo Ivanov (BUL)		
Kim Ivett (AUS)		
Mark Jacob (GER)		
Małgorzata Kanieska (POL)		
Maike Kesseler (GER)		
Luise Kraatz (GER)		
Marzena Łagowska (POL)		
Nigel Leddie (ENG)		
Peggy Li (CHN)		
Lyu Xilin (CHN)		
Olivier Marteel (BEL)	2015, 2022	
Graham Mason (ENG)		
Rudy Mathues (BEL)		
Radosław Matusiak (POL)		
Hilde Moens (BEL)		
Robin Moors (BEL)		
Thorsten Mueller (GER)		
Peter Ogburn (ENG)		
Miłosz Olborski (POL)		
John Pellew (WAL)		
Erich Pließnig (AUT)		
Eva Poskočilová (CZE)		
Martyn Royce (ENG)		
André Santos (PRT)		
Jan Scheers (BEL)		
Ingo Schmidt (GER)		
Marek Sedmak (SVK)		
Rob Spencer (ENG) (Note: Rob Spencer has refereed twelve 147 breaks, more than any other referee.)	2026	
Monika Sułkowska (POL)		
Glen Sullivan-Bisset (ENG)		
Agnieszka Thomson (SCO)		
Bart Tournel (BEL)		
Anastasiya Tuzikova (BLR)		
Proletina Velichkova (BUL)		
Ian Wagstaff (ENG)		
Wang Haitao (CHN)		
Wang Wei (CHN)		
Carl Whitby (ENG)		
Ben Williams (ENG)		
Tatiana Woollaston (BLR)		
Xie Yixin (CHN)		
Andy Yates (ENG)		
Robert Zabłocki (POL)		
Zhang Tao (CHN)		
Zheng Weili (CHN)		
Zhu Ying (CHN)		

=== Former referees ===
Name	World Snooker Championship finals	Ref.
Lawrie Annandale (SCO)	1998	
Stuart Bennett (ENG)		
Colin Brinded (ENG)	1999	
Bill Camkin (ENG)	1927 (Note: 1927 was the inaugural event.)	
Alan Chamberlain (ENG)	1997	
Charles Chambers (ENG) (Note: Charles Chambers was the referee in the match that led to the rule about minimum cue length. (see cue stick))	1937	
Paul Collier (WAL)	2004, 2016, 2021, 2024	
Greg Coniglio (ENG)		
Alex Crișan (ROU)		
S.A. De-Gruchy (JEY)	1957	
Bruce Duncan (SCO)		
Len Ganley (NIR) (Note: Len Ganley was the referee for the fastest ever 147 break made by Ronnie O'Sullivan at the 1997 World Snooker Championship. (see fastest 147))	1983, 1987, 1990, 1993	
Colin Humphries (ENG)		
Mark King (ENG)		
Sydney Lee (ENG) (Note: Sydney Lee refereed Pot Black, but was not an officially qualified referee.)		
Willie Leigh (ENG)	1934	
T. B. Leng (ENG)	1946, 1947	
W. Malkinson (ENG)	1929	
Michael Montalto (MLT)		
Brendan Moore (ENG) (Note: Brendan Moore has refereed ten 147 breaks.)	2014, 2018, 2023	
Patricia Murphy (IRL)		
John Newton (ENG)	2000	
Johan Oomen (NED)		
David Palmer (ENG)		
Harold Phillips (ENG)	1969	
Leo Scullion (SCO)	2019	
Fred Smith (ENG)	1928	
John Smyth (IRL)	1977, 1982	
John Street (ENG)	1980, 1986, 1989, 1992, 1995	
Michaela Tabb (SCO)	2009, 2012	
Jim Thorpe (ENG)	1972, 1984	
Bill Timms (ENG)	1973, 1974, 1976	
Jan Verhaas (NED) (Note: Jan Verhaas has refereed eight 147 breaks.)	2003, 2006, 2008, 2011, 2013, 2017	
Martin Webb (ENG)		
Eirian Williams (WAL)	2001, 2005, 2007, 2010	
John Williams (WAL)	1975, 1976, 1978, 1979, 1981, 1985, 1988, 1991, 1994, 1996, 2002	
Peter Williamson (ENG)		
