= 1931 World Snooker Championship =

Professional snooker tournament, held April to May 1931

Tournament information
- Dates: 27 April – 1 May 1931
- Venue: Lounge Hall
- City: Nottingham
- Country: England
- Organisation: Billiards Association and Control Council
- Highest break: Joe Davis (ENG) (72)

Final
- Champion: Joe Davis (ENG)
- Runner-up: Tom Dennis (ENG)
- Score: 25–21

The 1931 World Snooker Championship was a snooker tournament held at the Lounge Hall in Nottingham, England from 27 April to 1 May 1931. Despite increasing interest in the game of snooker, only two players entered the competition for the title: defending champion Joe Davis and three-times runner-up Tom Dennis. It was the fifth time that the World Snooker Championship had been contested since its inception in 1927. Davis won his fifth World title by defeating Dennis 25–21. Dennis led 19–16 at one stage but Davis won 9 of the next 11 frames to take the title. The highest break of the match was 72, compiled by Davis in the 41st frame.

== Background ==
The World Snooker Championship is a professional tournament and the official world championship of the game of snooker. The sport was developed in the late 19th century by British Army soldiers stationed in India. Professional English billiards player and billiard hall manager Joe Davis noticed the increasing popularity of snooker compared to billiards in the 1920s, and with Birmingham-based billiards equipment manager Bill Camkin, persuaded the Billiards Association and Control Council to recognise an official professional snooker championship in the 1926–27 season. In 1927, the final of the first snooker world championship was held at Camkin's Hall; Davis won the tournament by beating Tom Dennis in the final. Davis also won the title in 1928, 1929, and 1930, with Dennis runner-up in three of the first four years of the championship, the exception being 1928, when Fred Lawrence lost to Davis in the final.

== Championship details ==
The closing date for entries for the championship was 28 February 1931. Only two players entered, Joe Davis and Tom Dennis and so only one match was necessary, with the players left to decide the date and venue for a contest over 49 frames. The match was played from 27 April to 1 May. There were ten frames played each day with five frames in the afternoon and five in the evening (four on the final day). The match was held at The Lounge Billiard Hall, Shakespeare Street, Nottingham, which was owned by Dennis.

Dennis led 3–2 after the first afternoon session and increased his lead to 6–4 at the end of the first day. On the second day, Davis won each of the afternoon and evening sessions 3–2 to level the match at 10–10. Dennis won the third afternoon session 4–1. In frame 24, Davis made a break of 41, the first break over 40 of the match, but lost the frame 57–49. At one stage in the frame Dennis was snookered behind the brown ball "but jumped the cue ball clean over that obstacle" to make his escape, according to a report in the Nottingham Evening Post. In the 25th frame Davis made a 56 break before fouling a red when preparing to pot the black ball, missing his chance of beating his Championship record break of 79. Davis then won the evening session 4–1 to level the match again at 15–15.

On the fourth day Dennis again won the afternoon session 4–1 but Davis won all five frames in the evening to take a 21–19 lead. On the final day Davis won the first frame which included a 48 break and then the second frame with a 72 break, the highest of the match, missing an attempted double into the middle pocket. The afternoon session ended with Davis leading 24–21, needing just one more frame for victory. Davis took the first frame of the evening by a score 75–43, including a 58 break, to win the Championship 25–21. Davis was awarded with the "Championship Cup" by Tinsley Lindley, who also presented Dennis with the runner-up medal. Davis and Dennis played a further four frames for the benefit of the spectators.

Of the finals that Davis and Dennis contested, this was the closest match. Snooker historian Clive Everton has considered whether Davis may have allowed Dennis to win some frames in order to prolong the match and therefore increase the gate receipts, and concluded that it seems more likely that Dennis was playing better than Davis had expected. Everton wrote that when Davis was 16–19 behind, "it was entirely credible, though, that Joe should react to danger by raising his game and imposing his more positive personality when he needed to." Davis's brother Fred Davis, was a spectator at the match. Discussing his brother's early years of domination of the World Snooker Championship, Fred Davis wrote that "it was in nobody's financial interest for the match to be decided early" and that this is probably why there were few one-sided matches. Fred Davis also opined that as Joe Davis's ability was so far ahead of other players, "as soon as [Joe] started to apply himself fully, there could be only one winner."

== Final ==
Final: Best of 49 frames. Lounge Hall in Nottingham, England; 27 April–1 May 1931.
Joe Davis; England	25–21	Tom Dennis; England
Day 1: 57–47, 22–60, 44–66, 74–45, 41–50, 29–79, 20–52, 66–39, 84–46, 51–57 (4–6); Day 2: 48–43, 32–54, 36–52, 80–36, 68–18, 70–35, 21–85, 61–59, 56–66, 48–46 (10–10); Day 3: 8–101, 45–59, 7–59, 49–57, 75–32 (56), 74–23, 80–13, 80–22 (53), 59–53, 31–44 (15–15); Day 4: 42–63, 41–76, 88–21, 61–73, 64–73, 74–16, 56–25, 66–39, 95–21, 64–41 (21–19); Day 5: 110–2 (72), 75–43 (58), 50–56, 60–42, 27–76, 63–35 (25–21)
