= Nat Butler (snooker player) =

Sport
- Country: Scotland
- Sport: Snooker
- Professional: 1927-30

Nat Butler was a Scottish snooker player. He competed in the first World Snooker Championship in 1927 and again in 1930. In 1927 he was defeated 3–8 to Tom Carpenter in the opening round. In 1930, he defeated Tom Newman 13–11 to reach the semi-finals, where he was defeated by Tom Dennis 11–13.

== Career Finals: 3 (3 titles) ==
Outcome	No.	Year	Championship	Opponent in the final	Score
Winner	1	1926	BPA Professional Championship	C Frost (ENG)	4–1
Winner	2	1927	BPA Professional Championship	Tom Dennis (ENG)	4–1
Winner	3	1930	BPA Professional Championship	Frank Bass (ENG)	4–0
