= 1930 World Snooker Championship =

Professional snooker tournament

Tournament information
- Dates: 17 March – 23 May 1930
- Final venue: Thurston's Hall
- Final city: London
- Country: England
- Organisation: BACC
- Highest break: Joe Davis (ENG) (79)

Final
- Champion: Joe Davis (ENG)
- Runner-up: Tom Dennis (ENG)
- Score: 25–12

The 1930 World Snooker Championship, known at the time as the Professional Championship of Snooker, was a snooker tournament held between 17 March and 23 May 1930 at various venues in England, with the final taking place from 19 to 24 May at Thurston's Hall, London. Defending champion Joe Davis won the title for the fourth time by defeating Tom Dennis by 25 frames to 12 in the final.

It was the fourth edition of the World Snooker Championship organised by the Billiards Association and Control Council. Six players participated in the tournament. One first round match was held at Newman's Club, London, and the venue for the other first round match and the semi-finals was Camkin's Hall, Birmingham. The highest break of the tournament was 79, a new championship record, compiled by Davis in the 12th frame of the final. Davis won both of his matches in the tournament by margins that meant the last day of play scheduled was not required. It was the third time in four years that Dennis was runner-up.

== Background ==
Professional English billiards player and billiard hall manager Joe Davis had noticed the increasing popularity of snooker compared to billiards in the 1920s, and with Birmingham-based billiard hall manager Bill Camkin, who had also seen snooker's increasing appeal, persuaded the Billiards Association and Control Council (BACC) to recognise an official professional snooker championship in the 1926–27 season. The inaugural event was won by Davis, who defeated Tom Dennis 20–11 in the final. Originally called the Professional Championship of Snooker, the annual competition was not titled the World Championship until 1935, but the 1927 tournament is now referred to as the first World Snooker Championship.

The 1930 Championship was the fourth staging of the championship, the three previous editions all having been won by Davis. The closing date for entries for the 1930 tournament was 30 November 1929. The entry fee was set at five guineas per player (equivalent to £297 in 2025), with a five guineas sidestake required for each match.

All matches apart from the final were to be best of 25 frames, played over three days, with the final contested over 49 frames across six days, an increase from 33 the previous year. The championship conditions stipulated that Thurston's Hall was to be the venue for the final, which was expected to take place straight after the conclusion of the Professional Championship of English Billiards. For pre-final matches, the players concerned were to arrange the dates and venues. Entry fees would be used to provide prize money for the finalists, with 60 per cent going to the champion, and gate receipts for each match would be divided equally, after expenses (including 2.5 per cent of the gross receipts for the BACC), between the two players concerned.

There were six entries for the Championship: Joe Davis, Tom Newman, Alec Mann, Fred Lawrence, Tom Dennis and Nat Butler. The draw for the competition was made on 14 January 1930 at the BACC's offices in Cecil Chambers, Strand, London. The two first round matches were between Mann and Lawrence, and Newman and Butler. Davis and Dennis received byes into the semi-finals.

== Summary ==
=== First round ===
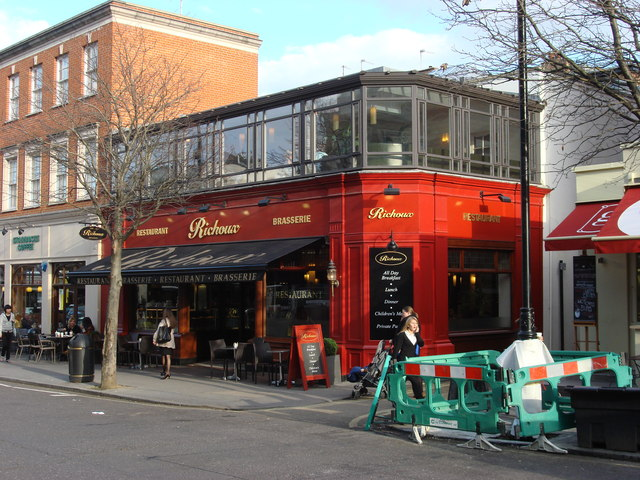
3 Circus Road, St John's Wood (pictured in 2009), formerly the location of Newman's Club.

Newman met Butler at Newman's Club in St John's Wood, London. Butler was 3–1 ahead after the first afternoon session, but Newman took all four frames in the evening to lead 5–3 on the first day. After the next afternoon session, Newman was still two frames clear at 7–5, and he won all four frames in the evening to make it 11–5. There was just one session on the following two days. Butler won all four frames on the third day and then won the first four frames on the final day to win 13–11.

Lawrence and Alec Mann played their first round match in Birmingham. After taking the first frame, Lawrence won the second by over 100 points, and the third on a re-spotted black. Lawrence won all eight frames on the first day, playing cautiously, including taking two and a half minutes deliberating over a particular shot. On the second afternoon, with Lawrence seemingly lacking the level of concentration that he had shown the previous day, Mann won all four frames. The players shared the four frames in an evening session that lasted nearly two and a half hours, ending with Lawrence Lawrence 10–6 ahead. Playing confidently, Mann won all four frames of the final afternoon to level the match at 10–10, including the twentieth which he won on the final black ball after Lawrence had failed in an attempt to pot it. Lawrence took the first three frames in the evening to progress to the semi-finals 13–11.

=== Semi-finals ===
The first semi-final commenced on 23 April. Davis won the first four frames against Lawrence in 65 minutes, compiling breaks of 58, 50, 48, 44 and 37 in the process. W.W. Thornton wrote in the Birmingham Daily Gazette that this was "a performance which I can not recollect having been equalled by Davis himself or any other player under championship conditions, and described Lawrence during the session as "an amazed spectator." This was followed by Davis winning all four of the first day's evening frames to lead 8–0. Although Davis did not play to the same standard on the second afternoon, he again took all four frames for 12–0, playing some shots with his left hand rather than his normal right. The thirteenth frame was won by Lawrence, who added the fourteenth by winning it on the final black ball before Davis secured victory at 13–2 with a day to spare. On the 25th, the pair played exhibition matches of billiards, over 75 minutes with Davis to win only if he scored twice as many points as Lawrence, and snooker. Davis won the afternoon billiards match 571–271, but lost the evening one (under the conditions agreed) by outscoring Lawrence 578–368, and won both frames of snooker played in each session.

Butler won the first two frames of his semi-final against Dennis on 1 May, with the first session ending level at 2–2. The pattern was repeated in the second session, with Butler taking a 4–2 lead then Dennis equalising. Dennis held a 10–6 lead after the second day. The first three frames of the final day were won by Butler to close to 9–10, before Dennis won the twentieth frame. In the concluding session, Dennis increased his lead to 12–9, then butler won the 22nd frame by a single point and added the next to move within one frame. Dennis secured victory at 13–11 by winning the 24th frame 60–34.

On 17 May, Davis won the Professional Championship of English Billiards for the third year in a row, defeating Newman 20,918–20,117 at Thurston's Hall.

=== Final ===
The final was scheduled to be played from Monday 19 May to Saturday 24 May and was over 49 frames. Davis had won the title each year since the championship's inception in 1927, whilst Dennis had been the runner-up in two of those three years. There were eight frames played each day with four frames in the afternoon and four in the evening (five on the final day). The match was held at Thurston's Hall. Davis led 6–2 at the end of the first day, winning both sessions 3–1. The report in the Sheffield Daily Telegraph stated that Davis had been "very lucky" to win three of the four evening frames, despite the high standard of his potting, as Dennis' tactical play represented "clever snooker." Davis won all four frames on the second afternoon but the evening session was split 2–2 to leave Davis 12–4 ahead. In the last frame of the afternoon session Davis scored a championship record break of 79. The Sheffield Daily Telegraph account of the match praised Davis' potting and positional play.

On the third day, Davis won the afternoon session 3–1, and after the players shared the frames in the evening session, Davis led 17–7 overnight. Each player won two frames on the fourth afternoon session but Davis won three in evening to lead 22–10. The fifth afternoon session was shared to leave Davis 24–12, needing just one more frame, with Davis recording a 70 break in the second frame of the day. Davis took the first frame in the evening to win 25–12, winning a day early and claiming the title for the fourth time. The championship trophy and medals were presented by John C. Bisset, chairman of the BACC.

== Schedule ==
1930 World Snooker Championship schedule
| Match | Dates | Venue, city | Ref. |
|---|---|---|---|
| Tom Newman v Nat Butler | 17–20 March 1930 | Newman's Club, London | |
| Fred Lawrence v Alec Mann | 17–19 March 1930 | Camkin's Hall, Birmingham | |
| Joe Davis v Fred Lawrence | 23–25 April 1930 (Note: The match was concluded on the second of the three scheduled days) | Camkin's Hall, Birmingham | |
| Tom Dennis v Nat Butler | 1–3 May 1930 | Camkin's Hall, Birmingham | |
| Joe Davis v Tom Dennis | 19–24 May 1930 (Note: The match was concluded on the fifth of the six scheduled days) | Thurston's Hall, London | |

== Main draw ==
Match results are shown below. Winning players and scores are denoted in bold text.

**Round 1** Best of 25 frames
**Fred Lawrence** (ENG) | **13**
Alec Mann (ENG) | 10
Tom Newman (ENG) | 11
**Nat Butler** (SCO) | **13**

**Semi-finals**; Best of 25 frames
(England) **Joe Davis** | **13**
(England) Fred Lawrence | 2
(England) **Tom Dennis** | **13**
(Scotland) Nat Butler | 11

**Final**; Best of 49 frames
(England) **Joe Davis** | **25**
(England) Tom Dennis | 12

=== Final ===
Final: Best of 49 frames. Thurston's Hall, Leicester Square in London, England, 19–23 May 1930.
| **Joe Davis**; England | **25**–12 | Tom Dennis; England |
Day 1: 43–**57**, **70**–42, **56**–37, **81**–28, 55–**57**, **70**–25, **88**–43, **63**–20; Day 2: **76**–26, **68**–37, **56**–48, **104**–19 (**79**), 58–**75**, **83**–29, **84**–36, 32–**73**; Day 3: 48–**53**, **100**–13, **102**–22, **58**–38, 29–**57**, **83**–25, 37–**86**, **81**–33; Day 4: 12–**84**, **65**–49, **85**–24, 37–**80**, **75**–27, **56**–43, 41–**50**, **96**–37; Day 5: 55–**62**, **93**–39 (**70**), 25–**72**, **70**–57, **74**–33
