= Albert Cope =

English billiards and snooker player

Albert Francis Cope
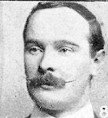

Personal information
- Born: c. 1878 Birmingham, England
- Died: February, 1930 (aged 51–52) Smethwick, England

Sport
- Country: England
- Sport: Snooker

Albert Francis Cope (c. 1878–1930) was an English professional billiards and snooker player. He played in the 1927 and 1928 World Snooker Championships. In his 1927 semi-final match against Joe Davis he scored a 60 break for which he later received a commemorative certificate.

== Playing career ==
Cope was born in Birmingham. Although primarily a billiards player, Cope was also an early exponent of snooker. In December 1913 he scored what was believed to be a world record break of 83. It included 14 reds and 14 colours. Cope was presented with "a large gold medal, suitably inscribed" to recognise the achievement.

By the time the World Snooker Championship started Cope was about 50 years old but he did play in the 1927 and 1928 events. In 1927 he beat Alec Mann before losing 16–7 to Joe Davis in the semi-final. In 1928 he played Mann again but lost this time. In his 1927 match against Joe Davis he scored a 60 break for which he later received a commemorative certificate from the Billiards Association and Control Council. The break remained the best in the World Championship until Davis made a 61 in the 1929 final. Cope died in February 1930. (Note: The Smethwick Telephone, 22 February 1930, states that Cope died at home in Smethwick on "Saturday last"; The Billiard Player (March 1930) states that he died at Dudley Road Hospital on 17 February.)
