= Willie Leigh =

English former professional snooker player (1907–1972)

William Ernest Leigh
- Leigh in 1946

Personal information
- Born: 1907 Derby, England
- Died: 20 November 1972 (aged 64–65)

Sport
- Country: England
- Sport: Snooker
- Professional: c.1927–1948

William Ernest Leigh (1907 – 20 November 1972) was an English professional snooker and English billiards player. He was born in 1907 in Derby, England, and died on 20 November 1972, in Nottingham, England, at the age of 65.

== Biography ==
William Ernest Leigh was born in Derby in 1907. His father was the licensee of the Station Hotel, Derby. He won the 1923 under-16s British Junior English Billiards Championship, defeating Frank Edwards 600–482 in the final. By 1927, having received coaching from Joe Davis and others, Leigh had turned professional.

In 1933 he entered the World Professional Snooker Championship for the first time, taking a 4–0 lead against fellow debutant Walter Donaldson before Donaldson levelled the match at 4–4. The players were also tied at 8–8 and 10–10 before Donaldson won 13–11. Leigh did not enter the championship again before it was suspended from 1940 to 1945 due to World War II. He served for five years in the Royal Air Force. His second world championship entry was in 1946 World Championship. Against Stanley Newman in the qualifying competition, Leigh recovered from 11–14 to lead 15–14, Newman then taking the 30th frame to force a decider. With the scores at 29 points each in the last frame, and only the colours left, Leigh failed to complete a straightforward pot of the yellow ball, and Newman went on to win the match 16–15. Later that month, Leigh was defeated 6,782–8,972 by John Barrie in the UK Professional English Billiards Championship.

He entered the World Snooker Championship twice more, winning two qualifying matches each time. In 1947 he eliminated Herbert Francis 19–16 and Sydney Lee 25–10 before losing 14–21 to Kingsley Kennerley. At the 1948 championship he defeated Herbert Holt in the deciding frame, 18–17, and then, having trailed Barrie 5–9, won 14 of the next 16 and progressed with a 21–14 win. He lost on the black ball in the deciding frame against John Pulman, 17–18.

Leigh, one of whose brothers was footballer Syd Leigh, became a resident professional at a billiard hall in Nottingham, and provided coaching. He died on 20 November 1972, aged 65.
