= 1929 World Snooker Championship =

Professional snooker tournament

Tournament information
- Dates: 17 December 1928 – 7 March 1929
- Final venue: Lounge Hall
- Final city: Nottingham
- Country: England
- Organisation: BACC
- Highest break: Joe Davis (ENG) (61)

Final
- Champion: Joe Davis (ENG)
- Runner-up: Tom Dennis (ENG)
- Score: 19–14

The 1929 World Snooker Championship, known at the time as the Professional Championship of Snooker, was a snooker tournament held between 17 December 1928 and 7 March 1929 at various venues in England, with the final taking place from 4 to 7 March 1929 at the Lounge Hall, Nottingham. Defending champion Joe Davis won the title for the third time by defeating Tom Dennis by 19 frames to 14 in the final, after securing a winning margin at 17–12.

It was the third edition of the World Snooker Championship. The first round match was held at Loughborough Town Hall, and the venue for the semi-finals was Camkin's Hall, Birmingham. The highest break of the tournament was 61, a new championship record, compiled by Davis in the 23rd frame of the final.

== Background ==
Professional English billiards player and billiard hall manager Joe Davis had noticed the increasing popularity of snooker compared to billiards in the 1920s, and with Birmingham-based billiard hall manager Bill Camkin, who had also seen snooker's increasing appeal, persuaded the Billiards Association and Control Council (BACC) to recognise an official professional snooker championship in the 1926–27 season. The inaugural event was won by Davis, who defeated Tom Dennis 20–11 in the final. Originally called the Professional Championship of Snooker, the annual competition was not titled the World Championship until 1935, but the 1927 tournament is now referred to as the first World Snooker Championship.

For the 1928 championship, a qualifying competition had been held to produce a challenger to Davis, the defending champion. In July 1928 the BACC decided to abandon the challenge system that had been employed for both the Billiards Championship and the Professional Snooker Championship. This meant that Davis, the champion, had to play through the 1929 tournament, which was the third staging of the championship.

The closing date for entries for the snooker championship was 15 October 1928. The entry fee was set at five guineas per player (equivalent to £288 in 2025), with a five-guineas sidestake required for each match. Preliminary heats and the semi-finals were to be best of 25 frames, played over three days, with the final contested over 33 frames across four days. When the conditions for the championship were published, Camkin's Hall in Birmingham was named as the venue for the final. For pre-final matches, the players concerned were to arrange the dates and venues.

== Summary ==
Five players entered the Championship: Joe Davis (Chesterfield), Tom Dennis (Nottingham), Fred Lawrence (Birmingham), Alec Mann (Birmingham) and Kelsall Prince (Loughborough). Lawrence and Mann had to play a first round match, with the winner to meet Davis. Dennis and Prince faced each other in the other semi-final.

The first match played was the semi-final between Dennis and Prince. This was scheduled from 17 to 22 December 1928 at Town Hall, Loughborough, over six evening session rather than across the three sets of afternoon and evening sessions envisaged when the tournament's conditions were announced. There was just one of four frames each evening, with five planned for the final day. The match was close until halfway through the fourth session with Dennis then leading 8–6. However, Dennis then took the next five frames to win the match 13–6. He added the final frame of the evening to leave the score at 14–6 after five sessions. The match did not continue to the planned sixth session and so finished on 21 December.

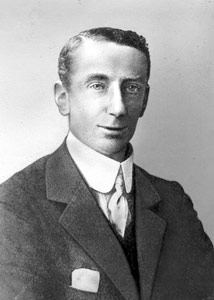
The Championship Cup was presented by Tinsley Lindley.

The first round match and the other semi-final were arranged for the week of 21 to 26 January 1929 at Camkin's Hall, Birmingham. The first round match was on the first three days; the winner to play Davis on the last three days. Both matches were over 25 frames with two sessions of four frames each day. After 13 frames of their match, Lawrence led Mann 10–3 but Mann won the last three frames of the day to close the gap to 10–6. On the final day, Mann continued his run of frames, winning 9 out of 10, to take a 12–11 lead. However, Lawrence won the last two frames to take the match 13–12. A columnist in the March 1929 edition of The Billiard Player magazine praised Mann's potting and Lawrence's safety play generally, but commented that "almost atrociously bad technique" by Mann when attempting to pot the yellow instead of playing for a snooker in the deciding frame lost him the match. The same writer also added that "the scarcity of the London Press reports in connexion with the Professional Snooker Games ... was freely commented upon in Birmingham."

In the Birmingham semi-final, Davis obtained a 5–3 lead on the first day, maintaining a two-frame advantage at 9–7 after two days. On the final day Davis won the first two frames but Lawrence took the next two to again close the gap. On the final evening, Davis won the first frame to lead 12–9 but lost the following frame. Davis added the third frame of the evening to secure a 13–10 victory.

=== Final ===
At the request of Davis and Dennis, the BACC agreed to change the venue and date of the final from Camkin's Hall in late March. The 33-frame final was played from 4 to 7 March. Eight frames were played each day, with four frames in the afternoon and four in the evening (five on the final day). The match was held at The Lounge, Shakespeare Street, Nottingham and was refereed by W. Malkinson of Nottingham. Davis led 6–2 after the first day. On the third day, the first frame featured prolonged exchanges of safety play, before a 45 break by Davis. Dennis had an opportunity to win if he completed a clearance, but went in-off the pink ball and left Davis an easy pot, which he made, to win the frame. The following frame saw Davis's 31 break followed by a 36 break made by Dennis, before Dennis went in-off the blue ball. Dennis's potted blue had resulted in a foul stroke, the blue was replaced on its spot, and Davis potted it from in-hand, following that by potting the pink to win the frame. Dennis won the 15th frame by six points, after clearing the last three colours. He added the 16th frame, during which he escaped from a snooker with a massé shot, and potted the pink after Davis had gone in-off. With the frames from the session shared, Davis retained his four frame lead at 10–6.

On day three, Dennis took three of the four frames in the afternoon, but Davis won three in the evening to maintain his four frame advantage. Davis compiled a 61 break in that evening session, potting nine reds, six blacks and two blues in the 23rd frame. In the fourth afternoon session, on 7 March, Davis lost the first frame by one point, 56–57, despite making a break of 45. He took the next, aided by a fluke pot of a pink ball. With each player winning a further frame, the session finished with Davis 16–12 ahead. Davis then won the first frame in the evening, with breaks of 33, 24 and 33, to claim the championship by achieving a winning margin at 17–12. The four "dead" frames were played, with each player winning two. The Championship Cup was afterwards presented by Tinsley Lindley. Davis's break of 61 was a new championship record, and the only break of over 50 made during the tournament. The secretary of the BACC, A. Stanley Thorn, claimed that "the event attracted considerable interest in Nottingham, and excellent attendances were present during the four days' play."

== Main draw ==
=== Schedule ===
1929 World Snooker Championship schedule
Match	Dates	Venue, city	Ref.
Tom Dennis v Kelsall Prince	17–22 December 1928	Town Hall, Loughborough	
Fred Lawrence v Alec Mann	21–23 January 1929	Camkin's Hall, Birmingham	
Joe Davis v Fred Lawrence	24–26 January 1929	Camkin's Hall, Birmingham	
Joe Davis v Tom Dennis	4–7 March 1929	Lounge Hall, Nottingham	

=== Results ===
Match results are shown below. Winning players and scores are denoted in bold text, with scores including "dead" frames.

**Round 1** Best of 25 frames
(England) **Fred Lawrence**	**13**
(England) Alec Mann	12

**Semi-finals**; Best of 25 frames
(England) **Joe Davis**	**13**
(England) Fred Lawrence	10
(England) **Tom Dennis**	**14**
(England) Kelsall Prince	6

**Final**; Best of 33 frames
(England) **Joe Davis**	**19**
(England) Tom Dennis	14

== Final ==
Final: Best of 33 frames. Lounge Hall in Nottingham, England, 4–7 March 1929. Referee: W Malkinson.
**Joe Davis**; England	**19**–14	Tom Dennis; England
Day 1: **70**–34, 57–**58**, **95**–4, **68**–56, **71**–24, **92**–54, 47–**56**, **80**–54; Day 2: **64**–48, **83**–22, 32–**59**, 29–**50**, 52–**63**, **75**–29, 38–**68**, **105**–15; Day 3: **73**–51, 51–**62**, 50–**62**, 44–**81**, **73**–41, **59**–34, **100**–42 (**61**), 24–**50**; Day 4: 56–**57**, **52**–41, 45–**78**, **87**–18, **98**–16, **82**–45, **63**–32, 46–**61**, 38–**70**
"Dead" frames were played, Davis winning the match 19–14.
