= 1935 World Snooker Championship =

Professional snooker tournament

Tournament information
- Dates: 8–27 April 1935
- Venue: Thurston's Hall
- City: London
- Country: England
- Organisation: BACC
- Highest break: Joe Davis (ENG) (110)

Final
- Champion: Joe Davis (ENG)
- Runner-up: Willie Smith (ENG)
- Score: 28–21

The 1935 World Snooker Championship was a snooker tournament held at Thurston's Hall in London, England from 8 to 27 April 1935. It was the first edition of the Championship to incorporate "world" in its name, being called the World's Professional Snooker Championship. Joe Davis won the title for the ninth time by defeating Willie Smith by 28 frames to 21 in the final, having achieved a winning margin at 25–20. Davis recorded the first century break in the history of the championship, a 110 in his semi-final match against Tom Newman.

There were five entrants, including Conrad Stanbury, who became the first ever Canadian to enter the championship. For the 1934 championship, only Davis and Newman had entered. Stanbury was drawn to play Smith, with the winner meeting Alec Mann in one semi-final, and Davis was drawn to play Newman in the other semi-final. All the matches in the 1935 tournament took place at Thurston's Hall, whereas in previous years players had been required to arrange venues for some matches themselves.

From July to November 1934, Davis had been in Australia, and from 29 October to 6 November he played an 81-frame match against Horace Lindrum which was reported as being the unofficial world championship. Davis won comfortably against Lindrum, taking a winning 41–22 lead. The match ended 46–29.

== Background ==
The World Snooker Championship is a professional tournament and the official world championship of the game of snooker. The sport was developed in the late 19th century by British Army soldiers stationed in India. Professional English billiards player and billiard hall manager Joe Davis noticed the increasing popularity of snooker compared to billiards in the 1920s, and with Birmingham-based billiards equipment manager Bill Camkin, persuaded the Billiards Association and Control Council (BACC) to recognise an official professional snooker championship in the 1926–27 season. In 1927, the final of the first professional snooker championship was held at Camkin's Hall; Davis won the tournament by beating Tom Dennis in the final. The annual competition was not titled the World Championship until the 1935 tournament, but the 1927 tournament is now referred to as the first World Snooker Championship. Davis had also won the title every year from 1928 to 1934.

== Unofficial World Championship ==
In late June and early July 1934, Joe Davis had travelled to Australia to play in the World Billiards Championship. Davis left Tilbury on 26 June and started his tour playing Clark McConachy in an exhibition billiards match in Sydney starting on 9 July. Davis received a bye to the final of the Billiards Championship and played Walter Lindrum, the defending Champion, in Melbourne, from 14 to 27 October. Walter Lindrum won a close match 23,553–22,678.

Davis had been due to leave Australia on 30 October but accepted an offer of a snooker match against Horace Lindrum, delaying his departure until 7 November. An 81-frame snooker match was arranged to be played at the Tivoli Billiard Theatre, Bourke Street, Melbourne from 29 October to 6 November with two sessions of five frames played each day. Davis insisted on using the same table that had been used for the World Billiards Championship final. The match was reported in both The Age and The Glasgow Herald as being the unofficial world championship.

Lindrum won the first two frames of the match, but Davis led 6–4 at the end of the first day. Davis made a break of 56 in the fifth frame. Davis extended his lead to 12–8 on the second day and then won eight frames on the third day to lead 20–10. Davis made breaks of 56 and 54 on the third day. Davis extended his lead to 27–13 on the fourth day but Lindrum won 6 frames on the fifth day to leave Davis 31–19 ahead. On the Saturday, the sixth day, Davis won 8 frames to lead 39–21, including a 50 break. Davis won frames 1 and 3 on the Monday afternoon to take a winning 41–22 lead. With the result decided the match became more open and Lindrum had breaks of 54 and 80, the highest of the match. The final Tuesday afternoon session was abandoned, because it clashed with the Melbourne Cup. After a final evening session of 5 frames Davis finished 46–29 ahead.

In late November, Fred Lindrum, Horace Lindrum's uncle, criticised Davis for demanding a £100 side-bet and for insisting on the use of the match table that had been used for the World Billiards Championship final against Walter Lindrum. Horace had just successfully challenged Fred for the Australian Professional Billiards Championship. In 1974, Horace Lindrum wrote that although the money that he lost was approximately equivalent to his fare to England and this had deprived him of the opportunity to enter the following professional championship, the contest provided "match experience against a top class overseas player. It was experience I urgently needed."

== Summary ==
There were five entrants to the 1935 World Snooker Championship: defending champion Joe Davis, Willie Smith, Alec Mann, Tom Newman, and Conrad Stanbury, who became the first ever Canadian to enter the championship. Davis and Newman had been the only entrants in 1934. All of the matches in the 1935 tournament took place at Thurston's Hall, whereas in previous years players had been required to arrange venues for some matches themselves. The final was to be 49 frames played over five days, with the other matches all being 25 frames played over three days each. Stanbury was drawn to play Smith, with the winner meeting Mann in one semi-final, and Davis was drawn to play Newman in the other semi-final. On 6 April, Davis retained the UK Professional English Billiards Championship, by completing a 21,733–19,910 defeat of Newman at Thurston's.

=== First round ===
Willie Smith and Conrad Stanbury played their first-round match from 8 to 10 April. The players and referee agreed in advance that, contrary to the official rules of the game, they would nominate a colour ball being played for only if there might be some doubt, rather than in every case. (Note: The current rules of snooker require a player to verbally nominate the object ball only if requested by the referee.) Stanbury took a 2–0 lead, and Smith won the other frames played in the afternoon to equalise. in the evening, Smith moved into a 4–2 lead, and the day ended with the layers at 4–4. Stanbury won five of the eight frames on the second day to lead 9–7. Smith won three frames in the final afternoon session to level the match at 10–10. Stanbury took a 12–11 lead but Smith won the last two frames to win the match, after Stanbury missed a straightforward attempt to pot the pink ball in the deciding frame.

=== Semi-finals ===
In the first semi-final, played from 11 to 13 April, Smith faced Alec Mann. Smith won all eight frames on the first day, and compiled a 74 break in frame 5. Mann took the first three frames on the second day, but the score at the end of the day was 12–4 to Smith, leaving him just one frame from victory. Smith took the first frame on the third day 50–44 to win the match 13–4. The remaining "dead" frames were played, with the eventual score being 18–7 to Smith.

Joe Davis and Tom Newman met in the second semi-final, from 15 to 17 April. Newman won the first frame but at the end of the first day Davis led 5–3, extending his lead to 7–5 after the second morning session, and 10–6 after two days. On the final day Davis won the first three frames to win the match 13–6. In frame 24, a "dead" frame, Davis made a break of 110 winning the frame 135–0. Davis eventually finished 15–10 ahead. The 110 was the first century break in the history of the tournament.

=== Final ===
The final between Davis and Smith was held from 22 to 27 April. Davis won the first four frames, but the evening session was tied to leave the score at 6–2. Smith then reduced the gap after the second day, which ended with Davis leading 9–7. Davis led 14–10 at the half-way stage with the score at 18–14 after day 4, and 22–18 after day 5. After the final afternoon session the score was 24–20 and the match ended on the first evening frame which Davis won by 58 points to 39, securing victory at 25–20. The remaining frames were played out with Davis eventually winning 28–21. Davis scored the highest break of the final, a 92 break in frame 38, with 12 reds, 8 blacks and 4 pinks. It was Davis's ninth consecutive title victory in the championship.

=== Aftermath ===
Snooker historian Clive Everton later claimed that the championship record break of 110 made the tournament more financially viable, saying that it "established the [world snooker championship] as a paying proposition." In his column for Reynolds's Illustrated News, published the day after the conclusion of the final, Smith wrote that snooker was "gradually ousting billiards in the clubs and public halls", saying that he regretted this, as he preferred billiards because it was harder to master. He noted that "the public seems to like snooker best at the professional games" and that for the final against Davis, "the hall has been packed – the first time it has happened in the history of the Professional Snooker Championship." The Billiard Player similarly reported that "For the first time in its history this contest drew large and continuous crowds to Thurstons." Previously, snooker had featured at Thurston's only for the championship itself or alongside headlining billiards matches, but the following season included the first week-long snooker matches at the venue.

== Schedule ==
1935 World Snooker Championship schedule
Match	Dates	Venue, city
Willie Smith v Conrad Stanbury	8–10 April 1935	Thurston's Hall, London
Willie Smith v Alec Mann	11–13 April 1935	Thurston's Hall, London
Joe Davis v Tom Newman	15–17 April 1935	Thurston's Hall, London
Joe Davis v Willie Smith	22–27 April 1935	Thurston's Hall, London

== Main draw ==
Match results are shown below. Winning players and scores are denoted in bold text.

**Round 1** Best of 25 frames
**Willie Smith (ENG)**	**13**
Conrad Stanbury (CAN)	12

**Semi-finals**; 25 frames
(England) **Joe Davis**	**15**
(England) Tom Newman	10
(England) Alec Mann	7
(England) **Willie Smith**	**18**

**Final**; 49 frames
(England) **Joe Davis**	**25**
(England) Willie Smith	20

=== Final ===
Final: Best of 49 frames. Thurston's Hall, London, England, 22–27 April 1935.
**Joe Davis**; England	**25**–20	Willie Smith; England
Day 1: **56**–52, **65**–41, **95**–9, **66**–37, 44–**68**, **62**–48, **65**–27, 40–**55**; Day 2: 26–**88**, **109**–9, 26–**77**, **84**–1, **53**–27, 51–**64**, 35–**85**, 27–**76**; Day 3: **88**–15, **72**–44, **70**–42, **60**–46, 48–**76**, **69**–45, 30–**67**, 43–**56**; Day 4: 35–**69**, **62**–45, **104**–11, 26–**93**, **71**–34, 58–**63**, 50–**54**, **81**–29; Day 5: 20–**77**; 35–**83**; 35–**77**, **65**–55, **80**–39, **100**–28 (**92**), 44–**53**, **76**–18; Day 6: 52–**62**; **64**–51; **101**–24 (**75**); 28–**89**; **58**–39
"Dead" frames were played. Davis had secured victory at 25–20.

== Century breaks ==
The 110 break by Joe Davis in his semi-final match against Tom Newman was the first century break in the eight-year history of the tournament.

- 110 – Joe Davis
