= Tom Dennis (snooker player) =

English snooker and billiards player

Thomas Arthur Dennis
- Tom Dennis, Billiards player

Personal information
- Born: 1882 Nottingham, England
- Died: January 1940 (aged 57) Nottingham, England

Sport
- Country: England
- Sport: Snooker
- Professional: 1926–1936

Thomas Arthur Dennis (1882 – January 1940) was an English professional snooker and English billiards player.

== Career ==
Dennis won the Billiard Professionals' Association (BPA) English billiards championship in 1914, 1921, 1922, and 1924, and also won the BPA Snooker Championship in 1923, 1924 and 1929. In 1925 he was ill in hospital for several months, which meant he was unable to defend his BPA titles and also faced the prospect of losing the two billiard saloons that he ran.

He reached the final of the World Snooker Championship in 1927, 1929, 1930, and 1931, but was beaten every time by Joe Davis. The closest Dennis came to defeating Davis was in the 1931 tournament, when the pair were the only two entrants. The match, played in the back room of his own pub in Nottingham, saw Dennis lead 14-10 and 19–16, before losing 21–25. He competed in two more championships, making his last appearance in 1933. He also reached the final of the tournament in 1927, losing to Davis in the final 11–20. After his final loss in 1931, he played in the event twice more, losing in the semi-final on both occasions, to Clark McConachy, and Willie Smith respectively.

Dennis had to withdraw from the 1936 World Snooker Championship after having an operation on his right eye.

== Personal life ==
He had three sons: Thomas Leslie, William Henry by his first wife and David with his second wife, Kathleen. William was a successful amateur snooker player, reaching the final of the 1937 English Amateur Championship, losing 5–3 to Kingsley Kennerley.

== Snooker performance timeline ==
| Tournament | 1923/ 24 | 1924/ 25 | | 1925/ 26 | 1926/ 27 | 1927/ 28 | 1928/ 29 | 1929/ 30 | 1930/ 31 | 1931/ 32 | 1932/ 33 | 1933/ 34 | 1934/ 35 | 1935/ 36 |
|---|---|---|---|---|---|---|---|---|---|---|---|---|---|---|
| BPA Professional Championship | W | W | WD | NH | SF | F | W | NH | SF | SF | Tournament Not Held | | | |
| World Championship | Not Held | | | | F | QF | F | F | F | SF | SF | A | A | WD |

Performance Table Legend
| W | won the tournament | F | lost in the final | SF | lost in the semi–finals |
| QF | lost in the quarter-finals | WD | withdrew from the tournament | A | did not participate in the tournament |
| NH | event was not held | | | | |

== Career finals ==
=== Career Finals: 7 (3 titles) ===
| Outcome | No. | Year | Championship | Opponent in the final | Score |
|---|---|---|---|---|---|
| Winner | 1 | 1923 | BPA Professional Championship | WJ Ayers (ENG) | 4–1 |
| Winner | 2 | 1924 | BPA Professional Championship | WJ Ayers (ENG) | 4–2 |
| Runner-up | 1 | 1927 | World Snooker Championship | Joe Davis (ENG) | 11–20 |
| Runner-up | 2 | 1929 | World Snooker Championship | Joe Davis (ENG) | 14–19 |
| Winner | 3 | 1929 | BPA Professional Championship | George Rivett (ENG) | 4–1 |
| Runner-up | 3 | 1930 | World Snooker Championship | Joe Davis (ENG) | 12–25 |
| Runner-up | 4 | 1931 | World Snooker Championship | Joe Davis (ENG) | 21–25 |
