= Fred Smith (snooker player) =

English snooker player

Fred Smith was a professional billiards and snooker player.

== Career ==
Smith ran the "Tudor Billiards hall" in Augusta Place, Leamington Spa from 1925 to 1932 when it was sold.

Smith entered the 1928 World Championship, where he lost his first match 12–6 to Tom Newman. The match was played at the Albert Hall, the British Legion Headquarters, in Kenilworth Street, Leamington Spa. In May 1928 Smith refereed the final of the World Championship in Birmingham.
