= 1928 World Snooker Championship =

Professional snooker tournament

Tournament information
- Dates: 28 December 1927 – 17 May 1928
- Final venue: Camkin's Hall
- Final city: Birmingham
- Country: England
- Organisation: BACC
- Highest break: Alec Mann (ENG) (46)

Final
- Champion: Joe Davis (ENG)
- Runner-up: Fred Lawrence (ENG)
- Score: 16–13

The 1928 World Snooker Championship was a professional snooker tournament held at various venues from 28 December 1927 to 17 May 1928. It was the second staging of the World Snooker Championship. It was played on a challenge basis with the other six entrants playing off for the right to challenge defending champion Joe Davis in the final. The final was held at the Camkin's Hall in Birmingham, England, with three of the other matches contested there, and one each played in Leamington Spa and Nottingham.

Davis won 16–13 in the final against Fred Lawrence, and retained the title. Davis had won the professional billiards championship earlier in May, and became the first person to hold the professional titles in billiards and snooker titles concurrently, and then the first person to win them both in the same season. The highest break of the snooker tournament was 46, compiled by Alec Mann in the third frame of his first round match against Albert Cope.

== Background ==
Professional English billiards player and billiard hall manager Joe Davis had noticed the increasing popularity of snooker compared to billiards in the 1920s, and with Birmingham-based billiard hall manager Bill Camkin, who had also seen snooker's increasing appeal, persuaded the Billiards Association and Control Council (BACC) to recognise an official professional snooker championship in the 1926–27 season. The inaugural event was won by Davis, who defeated Tom Dennis 20–11 in the final. Originally called the Professional Championship of Snooker, the annual competition was not titled the World Championship until 1935, but the 1927 tournament is now referred to as the first World Snooker Championship.

For the 1928 championship, a qualifying competition was held to produce a challenger to Davis, the defending champion. Most of the rules of the competition were as per the previous year, except that the preliminary rounds were to be played over 23 frames (rather than the 15 in 1927). Entry fees would be used to provide prize money for the finalists, with 60 per cent going to the champion. As a trophy had been purchased the previous year, there was no need to deduct money from entry fees to buy one, unlike at the first staging. The venue for the semi-finals and final was to be Camkin's Hall, Birmingham, with those matches supervised by the Midland Counties Billiard Association, and the players concerned would be left to arrange the locations for earlier rounds. The entry fee was set at five guineas per player (equivalent to £285 in 2025), with a five-guineas sidestake required. The Billiards Championship had been contested on a similar basis, with qualifying matches to produce a challenger to the champion, previously, and the system continued for that competition as well, but with an entry fee of £50 for the preliminary rounds, equivalent to £2,716 in 2025.

The closing date for entries for the snooker championship was 1 November 1927. There were seven entrants: Davis, Dennis, Tom Newman, Fred Smith, Albert Cope, Alec Mann, and Fred Lawrence.

== Summary ==
The first match played was between Tom Newman and Fred Smith at the Albert Hall, Kenilworth Street, Leamington Spa from 28 to 30 December. Newman led 7–1 after the first day and 10–6 at the end of the second day. Newman won the first two frames on the final day to secure victory at 12–6.

Alec Mann compiled a break of 46 in the third frame against Albert Cope and made a 23 break at his following visit. During that frame he conceded points from five successive foul shots, and more from two later fouls, finally winning the frame by 107 points to 42. The match was 2–2 at the first interval, before Mann took three of the next four to lead 5–3 after the first day. On the second day, Mann added the first four frames, with Cope subsequently recovering from 3–9 to 6–10, and on the third day secured the win at 12–8. The three "dead" frames were played, resulting in a final score of 14–9 to Mann. Mann's break of 46 was the highest made in the 1928 tournament.

On 16 January, the day after he had eliminated Cope, Mann's match against Fred Lawrence commenced. Mann obtained a 3–1 lead, before the first day finished at 4–4. Lawrence took a 7–5 lead, and after the players each added a further two frames, was 9–7 ahead going into the last day. After the first session on the third day, Lawrence led 11–9, but Mann won the following frame, and added the almost 50-minute long 22nd frame. In the deciding frame, Lawrence led by 17 points to 4, before a 21 break from Mann. Lawrence, through safety play and snookers, gained penalty points conceded by Mann and won the frame with a 20 break from the yellow ball to the pink ball.

The match between Tom Dennis and Newman was played from 29 to 31 March at The Lounge, Shakespeare Street, Nottingham. Newman took a 5–3 lead on the first day and increased this to 11–5 after two days, just one frame from victory. Newman won the first frame on the final day to take a winning 12–5 lead. The evening session was rearranged to include a billiards match as well as a frame of snooker.

Newman and Lawrence met in Birmingham from 7 to 9 May. Lawrence led 6–2 after the first day. From 5–9, Newman won the last two frames on the second day to reduce Lawrence's lead to 9–7 but Lawrence progressed to the final against Davis by securing the first three frames on the final day to win the match 12–7.

On 5 May, Davis became the professional English billiards champion for the first time, defeating Newman 16,000 – 14,874, making sixty centuries in the last professional final to be played with ivory balls. Davis thereby became the first player to hold the professional titles in both billiards and snooker, an achievement not matched until his brother Fred Davis won the billiards championship in 1980.

=== Final ===
The final between Davis and Lawrence was played from 14 to 17 May in Camkin's Hall in Birmingham. Lawrence and Davis shared the opening four frames in the afternoon session for 2–2, but Davis won all four frames in the evening to lead 6–2 after the first day. Lawrence won three frames on the second evening but Davis still led 9–7 after two days play. Three consecutive frame victories on the third afternoon helped Davis obtain a 14–10 after the third day, needing just two frames on the final day. Lawrence won three of the four afternoon frames on the final day to reduce Davis's lead to 15–13, potting well in the first two frames before what the Birmingham Daily Gazette termed a "woefully weak shot" when he was attempting to pot the blue ball failed. Directly after this, Davis made a break of 18. Lawrence was 26 points behind after all the red balls had been potted, and although he potted the first five of the six coloured balls, left an easy opportunity on the black ball, with Davis potting it to take the frame. Lawrence, who made a 42 break, claimed the following frame for 13–15. Lawrence led 52–14 in the first evening frame but Davis eventually won it 64–56 to retain his title by 16 frames to 13. Davis became the first player to claim both the professional billiards and snooker titles in the same season. The highest break of the final was a 44 by Davis in the 24th frame, the last of the third evening. Two "dead" frames were then played, both won by Davis. The presentation of the trophy and a gold medal to Davis, and of cheques to both players, was made by Mr. T. Heyman, chairman of the Midland Amateur Billiards Association.

Davis recorded in his 1976 autobiography that "my old rival Fred Lawrence ... played extremely well and made me sweat it out," adding that "the finances worked out rather more favourably than in 1927," with Davis receiving £32 prize money (equivalent to £1,738 in 2025) and a £25 12s 6d share of the gate receipts (equivalent to £1,412 in 2025).

== Main draw ==
=== Schedule ===
The schedule for the tournament is shown below.

1928 World Snooker Championship schedule
Match	Dates	Venue, city	Ref.
Tom Newman v Fred Smith	28–30 December 1927	Albert Hall, Leamington Spa	
Alec Mann v Albert Cope	23–25 January 1928	Camkin's Hall, Birmingham	
Fred Lawrence v Alec Mann	26–28 January 1928	Camkin's Hall, Birmingham	
Tom Newman v Tom Dennis	29–31 March 1928	Lounge Hall, Nottingham	
Fred Lawrence v Tom Newman	7–9 May 1928	Camkin's Hall, Birmingham	
Joe Davis v Fred Lawrence	14–17 May 1928	Camkin's Hall, Birmingham	

=== Results ===
Match results are shown below. Winning players and scores are denoted in bold text. The score in the match between Mann and Cope includes "dead" frames.

**Round 1** Best of 23 frames
4	**Alec Mann (ENG)**	**14**
7	Albert Cope (ENG)	9
5	**Tom Newman (ENG)**	**12**
6	Fred Smith (ENG)	6

**Round 2** Best of 23 frames
2	**Fred Lawrence (ENG)**	**12**
Alec Mann (ENG)	11
3	Tom Dennis (ENG)	5
**Tom Newman (ENG)**	**12**

**Round 3** Best of 23 frames
**Fred Lawrence (ENG)**	**12**
Tom Newman (ENG)	7

**Final**; Best of 31 frames
1	**Joe Davis (ENG)**	**16**
Fred Lawrence (ENG)	13

== Final ==
Final: Best of 31 frames Camkin's Hall, Birmingham, England; 14–17 May 1928; Referee: Fred Smith.
Joe Davis; England	16–13	Fred Lawrence; England
Day 1: 95–38, 47–54, 93–28, 38–81, 84–59, 57–46, 89–20, 60–43; Day 2: 68–42, 95–29, 43–69, 40–63, 54–51, 40–44, 32–73, 59–66; Day 3: 74–65, 83–20, 41–74, 58–45, 50–78, 66–55, 44–71, 80–23; Day 4: 41–68, 38–69, 54–43, 40–74, 64–56
