= Fred Lawrence =

English snooker player

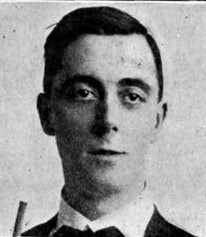

Personal information
- Born: 18 June 1887 Birmingham, Warwickshire, England
- Died: 4 January 1964 (aged 76) Birmingham, Warwickshire, England

Sport
- Country: England
- Sport: Snooker
- Professional: 1906–1947

Frederick William Lawrence (18 June 1887 – 4 January 1964) was an English Billiards and snooker player. In 1919 he won a second-class professional billiards tournament at Thurston's Hall. He won the Midland Counties Billiards Championship in 1920, and 1921. Lawrence lost 13 - 16 to Joe Davis in the final of the 1928 World Snooker Championship.

== Early life and billiards career ==
His full name was Frederick William Lawrence. Lawrence was born in Birmingham on 18 June 1887, and was the oldest son of Frederick John Lawrence and his wife Elizabeth (maiden surname of Bristow).

Lawrence was living with his parents and two siblings at Alfreton in Derbyshire when the 1891 census was taken. Lawrence's mother Elizabeth died in 1899 at Birmingham. Fred's father then married Nellie Wybrow at Birmingham in the same year.

Fred started playing billiards at the age of 13, and his father was the manager of a billiard room at Birmingham during the time of the 1901 census. By the time he was 15 Fred had made his first hundred break. By the age of 16, he had made more than twenty breaks over a hundred. By 27 January 1905, he had made eighty seven breaks of a hundred or over.

Lawrence's progress as a billiards player came to the attention of the veteran player John Roberts Jr. It was announced in The Birmingham Daily Mail, that Roberts was greatly impressed with his performances, and would play Fred Lawrence at Stockton-on-Tees on 3 March 1905. In a game of the first to 1,500 Roberts gave Lawrence a 700 start. By the end of the afternoon session, Fred was winning 1,101 - 546. Roberts managed to catch up in the evening session, but he lost the game by 48 points after Lawrence made an unfinished break of 65.

In newspaper articles during this time he was described as "the boy champion." This title was also still given to Fred long after adolescence. He had become a professional billiards player by February 1906.

By the time of his 21st birthday, Lawrence had played 638 matches, winning 523 of those. And he had made 700 breaks ranging from 100 - 363.

Due to ill health, Fred was out of the professional game from 1912. Lawrence had a bad attack of neuritis in early 1914. He suffered from rheumatism, and was rejected by the recruiting officers during the first world war because of this. But from 1916, he made a recovery and occasionally played exhibitions against amateurs to raise money for local charities during the war. He started practicing more, returned to form by 1919 and won a tournament for second-class professional billiards players, held at Thurston's Hall. Victory for Lawrence was secured on 26 August 1919 in a 4,000 - 2,515 win over Tom Carpenter. This was the sixth player that Fred had defeated in the tournament. He also had the highest break of that tournament, which was a 422 that he made on 25 July 1919 during a win over Albert Raynor.

Fred won the Midland Counties Billiards Championship on 10 January 1920, beating E.C. Breed in the final at Derby 7,000 - 6,165. He won the championship again in 1921 by beating Joe Davis in the final 7,000 - 6,134. The game finished on 16 April 1921 at Chesterfield.

He reached the semi-final of the Midland Counties Billiards Championship in 1922, and was beaten 6,809 - 7,000 by Joe Davis.

Lawrence had a 14,000 - 13,751 win over Joe Davis in the semi-final of the second-class championship on 24 February 1923. Fred played Arthur.F. Peall—son of former world champion W.J. Peall in the final. But he was not well, and on 10 March 1923, the championship was given to Peall who was leading 12,390 - 10,936 at that point. He was seriously ill with pneumonia and pleurisy. Ignoring the advice of his doctor, Lawrence turned up to play on the last day of the final at Camkin's Hall in Birmingham but was too ill. He was advised to return to his home in Stourbridge. It was believed doubtful that Fred would have been able to play billiards again until that Autumn. A benefit fund was established to raise money for him to give some compensation for money lost due to cancelled engagements during the time of this sickness.

Fred eventually recovered and resumed playing again. In a match against Joe Davis at Burroughes Hall in Piccadilly, on 12 October 1923, he finished a break of 662. It was Fred's highest ever break in billiards. This was following on from a break of 599, that Davis had completed the day before.

In 1924 he got to the finals of both the Midland, and Second Division championships losing in both of them to Joe Davis.

== Snooker career ==
Lawrence entered the World Snooker Championship on six occasions in the first half of the twentieth century. At his first attempt in 1927, he lost at the quarter-final stage 7–8 to Tom Dennis, and in 1928, he defeated Alec Mann 12–11 and Tom Newman 12–7 to reach the final, where he lost 13–16 to Joe Davis.

In the 1929 event, Lawrence was victorious over Alec Mann once more, this time by 13 frames to 12, to set up another meeting with Davis in the semi-final. He lost this match 10–13.

The 1930 tournament followed a similar path - again Lawrence beat Mann, that year by two frames at 13–11. But again he lost in the semi-final to Davis. This time it was a very heavy defeat, with Joe Davis winning by eleven frames, and the final score being 13–2 in favour of Davis.

He next appeared at the World Championship in 1946, losing in the first round 9–22 to Kingsley Kennerley, and the 1947 tournament, which proved to be Lawrence's final as a professional, ended with a 10–25 loss to John Barrie in his opening match.

Fred Lawrence died in Birmingham, on 4 January 1964. At the time of his death he was living at Small Heath.

== Snooker performance timeline ==
Tournament	1926/ 27	1927/ 28	1928/ 29	1929/ 30	1930/ 31	1931/ 32	1932/ 33	1933/ 34	1934/ 35	1935/ 36	1936/ 37	1937/ 38	1938/ 39	1939/ 40	1945/ 46	1946/ 47
World Championship	QF	F	SF	SF	A	A	A	A	A	A	A	A	A	A	LQ	LQ

Performance Table Legend
F	lost in the final	SF	lost in the semi–finals	QF	lost in the quarter-finals
LQ	lost in the qualifying draw	A	did not participate in the tournament		

== Career finals ==
=== Non-ranking event finals: 1 ===
Outcome	Year	Championship	Opponent in the final	Score
Runner-up	1928	World Snooker Championship	(England) Joe Davis	13–16
