= Willie Smith (billiards player) =

English billiards and snooker player

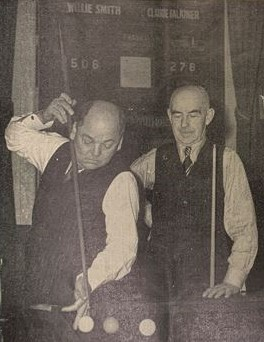
- Smith (right) and Claude Falkiner in 1949
- Born: 25 January 1886; Darlington, England
- Died: 2 June 1982 (aged 96); Leeds, England
- Sport country: England
- World Billiards Champion: 1920, 1923

Willie Smith

Sport
- Sport: Snooker
- Professional: 1932–1953 (snooker)
- Best ranking finish: World Snooker Championship runner-up (1933, 1935)

Willie Smith (25 January 1886 – 2 June 1982) was an English professional player of snooker and English billiards. Smith was, according to an article on the English Amateur Billiards Association's website, "by common consent, the greatest all-round billiards player who ever lived".

He studied previous Billiard players such as Melbourne Inman, Harry Stevenson, Tom Reece, Edward Diggle and George Gray, describing his play as "the combination of Gray's striking and Diggle's top-of-the-table play". Smith became a professional player in 1913.

He entered the World Billiards Championship in 1920 and then again in 1923, winning it on both occasions. Arguments with the governing body prevented him from taking part in the competition more often.

In 1930 he started writing for The Burwat Billiard Review, a magazine published by the Cue Sport Manufacturers Burroughes and Watts. These were instructional articles with accompanying illustrations and photographs.

He turned to snooker for purely monetary reasons but never really took to the game. His natural talent as a billiards player still enabled him to reach the World Snooker Championship final in 1933 and 1935 where he was beaten by Joe Davis.

== Snooker performance timeline ==
=== Pre-war ===
Tournament	1932/ 33	1933/ 34	1934/ 35	1935/ 36	1936/ 37	1937/ 38	1938/ 39	1939/ 40
Daily Mail Gold Cup (Note: Round-robin handicap tournament.) (Note: Billiards event before the 1936/37 season.)	Tournament Not Held				4	2	5	A
World Championship	F	A	F	QF	SF	SF	QF	A

=== Post-war ===
Tournament	1945/ 46	1946/ 47	1947/ 48	1948/ 49	1949/ 50	1950/ 51	1951/ 52	1952/ 53
World Professional Match-play Championship	Tournament Not Held						A	LQ
News of the World Snooker Tournament	Tournament Not Held				A	A	A	LQ
World Championship	A	A	A	A	LQ	A	A	NH

Performance Table Legend
F	lost in the final	SF	lost in the semi–finals	QF	lost in the quarter-finals
N	N = position in round-robin event	LQ	lost in the qualifying draw	A	did not participate in the tournament
NH	event was not held				
