= Alec Mann =

English snooker player

Personal information
- Born: 19 November 1901 Birmingham, England
- Died: April 1970 (aged 68) Birmingham, England

Sport
- Country: England
- Sport: Snooker
- Professional: 1926–1947

Alexander Edward 'Alec' Mann (19 November 1901 – April 1970) was an English professional snooker player.

== Career ==
Born in Birmingham on 19 November 1901, Mann turned professional in 1926, entering the 1927 World Championship, where he lost his first match 6–8 to Albert Cope after leading 6–1.

The following year, he defeated Cope 14–9 before losing 11–12 to Fred Lawrence in the second round; the highest break of the tournament was Mann's 46.

After two first-round exits in 1929 and 1930, Mann did not play competitively again until 1935, when he lost his semi-final match – his first in that year's tournament, 4–13 to Willie Smith.

Mann entered the World Championship on three more occasions, but following a 12–23 loss to Kingsley Kennerley in the 1947 edition, he did not play again.

He died in April 1970, aged 68.
