= World Snooker Championship =

Annual professional snooker ranking tournament

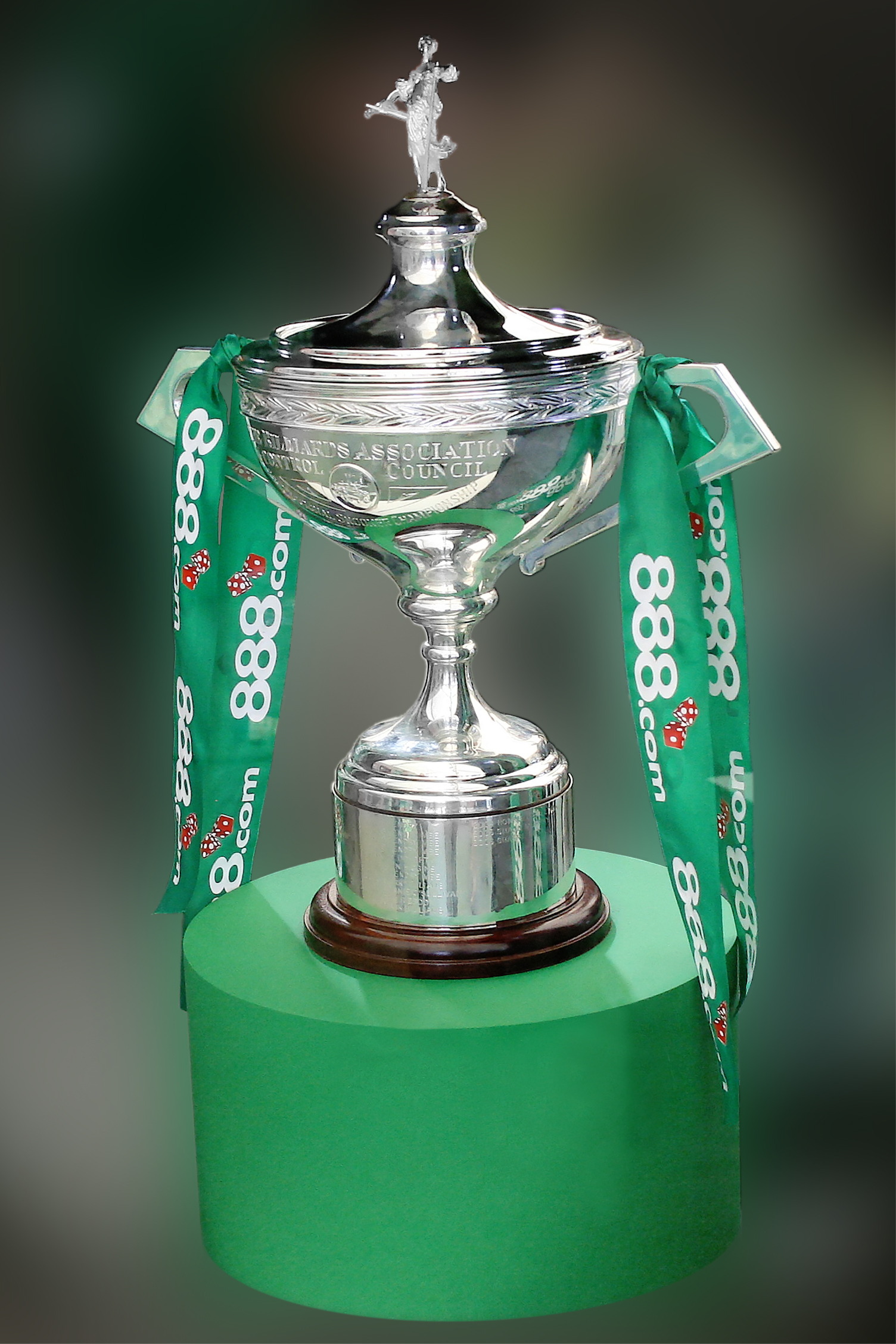
- World Snooker Championship trophy on display during the 2007 event

Tournament information
- Venue: Crucible Theatre
- Location: Sheffield
- Country: England
- Established: 1927
- Organisation(s): World Snooker Tour
- Format: Ranking event
- Total prize fund: £2,395,000
- Recent edition: 2026
- Current champion: Wu Yize (CHN)

The World Snooker Championship is the most prestigious tournament in professional snooker. The latest edition of the event had a total prize pool of £2,395,000, including £500,000 for the winner. It is now one of the three tournaments (together with the UK Championship and the invitational Masters) that make up snooker's Triple Crown Series. The reigning world champion is Wu Yize.

The event was first held in 1927 as a professional competition organised by the Billiards Association and Control Council, and Joe Davis won the title. In 1952, a rival tournament called the World Professional Match-play Championship was introduced by the Professional Billiards Players' Association to compete with the 1952 World Snooker Championship, which had only two entrants. The World Professional Match-play Championship was held as the world championship for snooker until 1957. From 1964 to 1968, the event was played using a challenge format, where the current champion would be challenged by another player. John Pulman won all seven challenge matches.

== History ==
=== Overview ===
Joe Davis dominated the tournament over its first two decades, winning the first 15 world championships before he retired undefeated after his final victory in 1946. The distinctive World Championship trophy, topped by a Greek shepherdess figurine retrospectively known as the Silver Lady, was acquired by Davis back in 1926. No tournaments were held between 1941 and 1945 due to World War II, or between 1952 and 1963 due to a dispute between the Professional Billiards Players' Association (PBPA) and the Billiards Association and Control Council (BACC) where the PBPA held an unofficial alternative championship; the official championship was revived on a challenge basis in 1964 and reverted to the knockout format in 1969, now known as the beginning of snooker's modern era.

It has taken place annually with every edition since 1977 staged at the Crucible Theatre in Sheffield, with only a planned exception in 2029 in order for the venue to undergo renovations. Under a format that has remained largely unchanged since 1982, 32 players reach the Crucible each year; the top 16 players in the world rankings qualify automatically, while another 16 players win places through a qualification tournament; only four qualifiers have ever won the tournament (Alex Higgins in 1972, Terry Griffiths in 1979, Shaun Murphy in 2005 and Zhao Xintong in 2025).

Stephen Hendry and Ronnie O'Sullivan have each won seven times to jointly hold the record of most world titles in the modern era. Ray Reardon and Steve Davis have won six titles; John Higgins and Mark Selby four; John Spencer and Mark Williams three; and Alex Higgins two. As of 2026, 92 editions of the World Championship have been staged and 30 players have won the Championship.

Fifteen maximum breaks have been made in the history of the tournament, by eleven different players—Cliff Thorburn compiled the first in 1983, and Mark Allen made the most recent in 2025. A record 109 century breaks were made at the Crucible in 2022.

=== Professional Snooker Championship (1927–1934) ===
Year	Champion	Runner-up
1927	Joe Davis (ENG)	Tom Dennis (ENG)
1928	Joe Davis (ENG)	Fred Lawrence (ENG)
1929	Joe Davis (ENG)	Tom Dennis (ENG)
1930	Joe Davis (ENG)	Tom Dennis (ENG)
1931	Joe Davis (ENG)	Tom Dennis (ENG)
1932	Joe Davis (ENG)	Clark McConachy (NZL)
1933	Joe Davis (ENG)	Willie Smith (ENG)
1934	Joe Davis (ENG)	Tom Newman (ENG)

The first championship was held in 1927, where it was known as the Professional Snooker Championship. It was the first professional snooker tournament although the English Amateur Championship has been contested since 1916. Ten professionals entered including most of the leading English billiards players. Matches were over 15 frames with the semi-finals over twenty-three frames and final over 31 frames. The first match played was between Melbourne Inman and Tom Newman at Thurston's Hall, Leicester Square in London. The snooker was played as an added extra to the main event, a billiards match played over two weeks. The match started on Monday 29 November 1926 and one frame of snooker was played at the end of each session. The final between Joe Davis and Tom Dennis was played over four days in early May at Camkin's Hall in Birmingham. Davis won the first seven frames, and took a winning 16–7 lead on the third day, eventually winning 20–11. The highest break of the tournament was sixty, made by Albert Cope in his semi-final match against Davis, in a dead frame after Davis had won the match.

The 1928 Championship was played on a challenge basis, with the other six entries playing-off for the right to challenge Davis in the final. Fred Lawrence progressed to the final, but lost 13–16. The challenge system was dropped in the 1929 event. Davis met Dennis in the final, played in Dennis's home town of Nottingham. Davis made a new record break of 61, on the way to a 19–14 victory. The same pair met in the 1930 final, played for the first time at Thurston's Hall in London, with Davis winning 25–12, with a day to spare and made a new record break of 79. With little prospect of success and little prospect of financial gain, there were only two entries for the 1931 Championship. Davis and Tom Dennis met for the fourth time, the event being played in Nottingham. Dennis led 19–16 at one stage, but Davis won nine of the next eleven frames to take the Championship 25–21.

There were three entries for the 1932 tournament. Clark McConachy met Davis in the final, played at Thurston's Hall. Davis took the title after a 30–19 win, and set a new record with a break of 99, missing out on his century after he snookered himself. There were five entries in 1933, with debutant Willie Smith meeting Davis in the final, but lost 18–25. There were just two entries in 1934, Davis being opposed by Tom Newman, six times World Billiards Champion. The match was held partly in Nottingham before finishing in Kettering, with Davis winning 25–22.

=== Thurston's Hall era (1935–1940) ===
Year	Winner	Runner-up
1935	Joe Davis (ENG)	Willie Smith (ENG)
1936	Joe Davis (ENG)	Horace Lindrum (AUS)
1937	Joe Davis (ENG)	Horace Lindrum (AUS)
1938	Joe Davis (ENG)	Sidney Smith (ENG)
1939	Joe Davis (ENG)	Sidney Smith (ENG)
1940	Joe Davis (ENG)	Fred Davis (ENG)

The 1935 Championship introduced some significant changes. It was the first to incorporate "world" in its name, being called the World's Professional Snooker Championship. There was also a change in the organisation of the event with the matches being played consecutively at the same venue, Thurston's Hall in London. In the period from 1935 to 1940, nearly all World Championship matches were played there and with good attendances the professionals could make some money from their share of the entrance charges. Because of the importance of gate receipts, all frames were played out, even if a player had already won the match.

There were five entries in 1935 Championship. Joe Davis beat Willie Smith 28–21 in the final. Davis recorded the first century break in the history of the championship, 110 in his semi-final match against Tom Newman. The break was made in a dead frame but was still regarded as a championship record. The success of the 1935 championship resulted in a record 13 entries in 1936. Joe Davis and Horace Lindrum met in the final, with Davis having won one of his prior matches 29–2 after taking a winning 16–0 lead; whilst Lindrum had won his semi-final by the same score, 29–2, In the final, Lindrum led 26–24 at the start of the final day and then won the first frame on the last day. However Davis won the last ten frames in a row to win 34–27.

Qualifying was introduced for the first time in 1937. As the event had nine entries, two players were chosen to play a qualification match. The two were Fred Davis, Joe's younger brother and Bill Withers. Withers won the match 17–14, a defeat that Fred put down to ignoring his worsening eyesight. Lindrum played Joe Davis in the final, and led 17–13 at the half-way stage, but Davis recovered to win the match 32–29. Davis made a break of 103 in the final, the first championship century in live play.

Lindrum chose not to enter the 1938 event, which Davis also won, beating Sidney Smith in the final. The following year, Davis met Smith again in the final, and took a winning 37–25 lead on the final day. The 1940 Championship featured the Davis brothers meeting in the final. Joe led 15–10 but then Fred won eleven frames in succession to lead 21–15. On the final day Joe made a 101 break to take a winning 37–35 lead. The spectators cheered for nearly a minute when Joe made his century. In October 1940, during The Blitz, Thurston's Hall was destroyed by a parachute mine which demolished the south-western corner of Leicester Square. No tournaments were played during the remainder of World War II.

=== Post-war era (1946–1952) ===
Year	Winner	Runner-up
1946	Joe Davis (ENG)	Horace Lindrum (AUS)
1947	Walter Donaldson (SCO)	Fred Davis (ENG)
1948	Fred Davis (ENG)	Walter Donaldson (SCO)
1949	Fred Davis (ENG)	Walter Donaldson (SCO)
1950	Walter Donaldson (SCO)	Fred Davis (ENG)
1951	Fred Davis (ENG)	Walter Donaldson (SCO)
1952	Horace Lindrum (AUS)	Clark McConachy (NZL)

The championship resumed in 1946 where Joe Davis again met Lindrum in the final. The Royal Horticultural Hall in London was converted to a snooker venue, seating 1,250 for the championships. The match was extended from one week to two, allowing up to 30,000 spectators to be accommodated with prices ranging from 5s to £3. Davis maintained a small lead throughout and won, early on the final day, leading 73–62. Davis made six centuries in the final, setting new championship records of 133 and 136. The event proved a financial success for the players, with Davis receiving £1,800 and Lindrum £550.

In October 1946, Joe Davis announced that he would no longer play in the World Championship, having never lost a match in the championship from its inception in 1927. He did not, in any other sense, retire from snooker, continuing to play in other tournaments and exhibition matches for many years. The finalists for the 1947 Championship, Fred Davis and Walter Donaldson, agreed to delay the final until the autumn so that it could be played at the rebuilt Thurston's Hall. Donaldson got off to a good start, leading 44–28 after the first week and eventually took a winning 73–49 lead early on the 11th day. The pair met again in the 1948 final, Fred Davis and Walter Donaldson again reached the final, with Davis winning 73–49. They also contested the 1949 Championship final, and although Donaldson led 39–33 after the first week, Davis pulled ahead on the second week and eventually took a winning 73–58 lead. After three finals at Leicester Square Hall the 1950 Championship final moved to Blackpool Tower Circus. Fred Davis and Donaldson met in the final for the next two years, with Donaldson winning in 1950, 49–42, and Davis in 1951.

Following a dispute between the Professional Billiards Players' Association (PBPA) and the Billiards Association and Control Council (BACC), members of the PBPA boycotted the 1952 Championship. The BACC thought the championship should be primarily a matter of honour, and financial considerations should come second. As a consequence of the boycott there were only two entries, Lindrum and McConachy. McConachy had played in the recent News of the World Tournament but had performed badly, losing all eight of his matches. Although Lindrum did not play in the News of the World Tournament, he had been receiving more generous starts in recent handicap tournaments and had even withdrawn from the 1950 Sporting Record Masters' Snooker Tournament in 1950, complaining about his overly generous handicap. Lindrum won the championship, reaching a winning 73–37 position early on the tenth day.

=== World Professional Match-play Championship (1952–1957) ===
Year	Winner	Runner-up
1952	Fred Davis (ENG)	Walter Donaldson (SCO)
1953	Fred Davis (ENG)	Walter Donaldson (SCO)
1954	Fred Davis (ENG)	Walter Donaldson (SCO)
1955	Fred Davis (ENG)	John Pulman (ENG)
1956	Fred Davis (ENG)	John Pulman (ENG)
1957	John Pulman (ENG)	Jackie Rea (NIR)

Having boycotted the official championship, the PBPA established their own championship called the PBPA Snooker Championship which attracted ten entries. Fred Davis and Donaldson were given byes to the semi-final stage, and met again in the final, held at the Blackpool Tower Circus, as Davis won 38–35. A second such championship was played the following year, referred to as the 1953 World Professional Match-play Championship, with the same finalists. Played at Leicester Square Hall, it was tied at 33–33 at the start of the final session but Davis won 37–34. The pair met in the 1954 Championship final, held in Manchester, their eighth successive final. It was the most one-sided of the eight finals, Davis taking a winning 36–15 lead early on the fifth day.

Fred Davis met John Pulman in the 1955 Championship final at Blackpool Tower Circus, with Davis winning 38–35. Davis defeated Pulman again in the 1956 final, but did not enter the 1957 Championship. Pulman defeated Jackie Rea in the final to win his first world title.

=== Challenge matches (1964–1968) ===
Date	Champion	Challenger
Apr 1964	John Pulman (ENG)	Fred Davis (ENG)
Oct 1964	John Pulman (ENG)	Rex Williams (ENG)
Mar 1965	John Pulman (ENG)	Fred Davis (ENG)
Sep–Dec 1965	John Pulman (ENG)	Rex Williams (ENG)
Dec 1965	John Pulman (ENG)	Fred Van Rensburg (SAF)
Apr 1966	John Pulman (ENG)	Fred Davis (ENG)
Mar 1968	John Pulman (ENG)	Eddie Charlton (AUS)

With the approval of the BACC, the championship was revived on a challenge basis in 1964. The first contest was played in Burroughes Hall, London in April 1964 between Pulman and Davis, with Pulman retaining the championship after winning 19–16. Pulman won two further challenge matches played at Burroughes Hall, beating Rex Williams in October 1964, and Davis again in March 1965. In late 1965 Pulman and Rex Williams played a long series of short matches in South Africa. Pulman won twenty-five of the forty-seven matches to retain the title. Williams set a new championship record with a break of 142 in the twenty-fourth match. After this series of matches Pulman played the South African Fred Van Rensburg, winning 39 frames to 12. Davis and Pulman played again for the championship in April 1966. Pulman won four of the seven matches to retain the title. Australian Eddie Charlton challenged Pulman to a 73 frame match in Bolton, played in March 1968. Pulman led 19–17 at the half-way stage, and pulled ahead and won the match 37–28.

=== Start of modern era knockout tournaments (1969–1976) ===
Year	Winner	Runner-up
1969	John Spencer (ENG)	Gary Owen (WAL)
1970	Ray Reardon (WAL)	John Pulman (ENG)
1971	John Spencer (ENG)	Warren Simpson (AUS)
1972	Alex Higgins (NIR)	John Spencer (ENG)
1973	Ray Reardon (WAL)	Eddie Charlton (AUS)
1974	Ray Reardon (WAL)	Graham Miles (ENG)
1975	Ray Reardon (WAL)	Eddie Charlton (AUS)
1976	Ray Reardon (WAL)	Alex Higgins (NIR)

For 1969, the championship reverted to being run as a knockout tournament. This is regarded as the beginning of the modern era for snooker. Eight professionals entered, four from the 1950s and four new professionals. The first match, played in late 1968, saw the end of John Pulman's reign as champion, beaten by one of the new professionals, John Spencer. Spencer led 24–18 after the final afternoon session and clinched the match by winning the first frame in the evening with a ninety-seven break. Spencer and another of the new professionals, Gary Owen, met in the final at the Victoria Halls in London. Spencer won the seventy-three frame final 37–24. Spencer lost to Ray Reardon at the semi-final stage of the 1970 Championship. Reardon went on to win the final against John Pulman to win his first title.

The next world championship was held in Australia in late 1970. For the only time there was a group stage with nine players, with the top four moving on to a knock-out stage. Ray Reardon and John Spencer met in one semi-final with Spencer winning easily. The other semi-final was between two Australians, Warren Simpson and Eddie Charlton. Simpson caused a major upset by beating Charlton. In the final in Sydney, Spencer led throughout and won the six-day final 37–29. 1972 saw the emergence of Alex Higgins. Winning his two qualifying matches, he beat John Pulman, Rex Williams and then Spencer in the final to win the title at his first attempt. At 22 years, 345 days, Higgins was the youngest world champion. Previously only Joe Davis had won the title while under the age of 30, being 26 years, 27 days when he won in 1927.

The 1973 Championship marked a change in format, with the tournament played over two weeks at a single venue rather than over an extended period. Sixteen played in the first round, the eight winners playing eight seeded players in the second round. In the semi-finals, defending champion Alex Higgins lost 9–23 to Eddie Charlton while Ray Reardon beat John Spencer 23–22. In the five-day final Charlton led 7–0 after the opening session but Reardon led 17–13 after two days. The match continued to be close but Reardon pulled ahead on the final day to win 38–32, for his second title. The 1974 Championship followed a similar format but with somewhat shorter matches and event reduced to ten days. Sixty-year-old Fred Davis beat Alex Higgins in the quarter-finals before losing to Ray Reardon. Reardon met Graham Miles in the three-day final. Reardon led 17–11 after two days and won comfortably 22–12.

The 1975 Championship was held in Australia. Twenty-seven players competed including eight from Australia, sixteen from the United Kingdom, two from Canada and one from South Africa. Ray Reardon beat John Spencer and Alex Higgins to reach the final where he met Eddie Charlton. The final was held near Melbourne but matches were held in many locations, the semi-finals having been held in Canberra and Brisbane. In the final, Reardon won ten of the twelve frames on the second day to lead 16–8 but Charlton won the first nine frames on the third day to lead. Reardon then led 23–21 before Charlton won eight frames in a row to lead 29–23, needing just two of the last nine frames to win. However Reardon then won seven frames in a row to lead again and, although Charlton levelled the match at 30–30, Reardon won the deciding frame.

The 1976 World Snooker Championship took place at two separate venues; one half of the draw was held in Middlesbrough and the other half in Manchester, which also hosted the final. Alex Higgins won three close matches to reach the final, where he met Ray Reardon. Reardon led 24–15 at the start of the last day and, winning three of the first four frames, took the title 27–16, his fourth successive title. There were a number of problems during the tournament including the standard of the tables. This was the first year the championship was sponsored under the cigarette brand Embassy.

=== Crucible era starts (1977–1980) ===
Year	Winner	Runner-up
1977	John Spencer (ENG)	Cliff Thorburn (CAN)
1978	Ray Reardon (WAL)	Perrie Mans (RSA)
1979	Terry Griffiths (WAL)	Dennis Taylor (NIR)
1980	Cliff Thorburn (CAN)	Alex Higgins (NIR)

In 1977, the championship moved to its new home at the Crucible Theatre in Sheffield, where it has remained ever since. The 1977 Championship featured sixteen competitors: eight seeded players and eight qualifiers. John Spencer beat defending champion Ray Reardon 13–6 in the quarter-finals, and met Canadian Cliff Thorburn in the final. The two players were closely matched throughout, the score being tied at 9–9 after the first day and 18–18 after the second. Spencer led 22–20 after the first session on the final day, and pulled ahead to win 25–21 in the final session of the match.

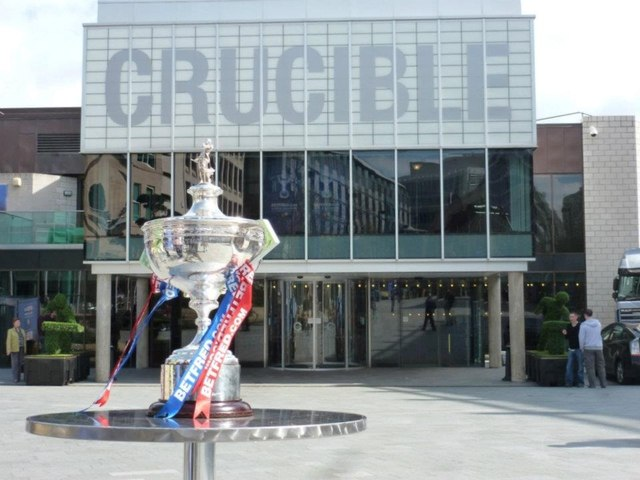
The World Snooker Championship trophy in front of the Crucible Theatre

Defending champion John Spencer lost to Perrie Mans in the first round of the 1978 Championship. The 1977 runner-up Cliff Thorburn was defeated 12–13 in his quarter-final match against Eddie Charlton, who won the last five frames. However, Charlton then lost to Ray Reardon in the semi-finals; he was ahead 12–9 after the first three sessions of the match, but Reardon won all seven frames of the fourth session to win 18–14. Mans met 64-year-old Fred Davis in the other semi-final, defeating him 18–16. Reardon won the final 25–18 to claim his sixth world title. He became the oldest World Champion, aged 45 years, 203 days. The first seven World Snooker Champions all won a championship when in their forties; the last of these was Reardon. It would be another forty years before a player over 40 years old won the title again, as Mark Williams won the 2018 Championship aged forty-three.

The 1979 Championship was won by Terry Griffiths who had only turned professional seven months prior to the tournament, and needed to win two qualifying matches to reach the Crucible. Griffiths was trailing 16–17 against Eddie Charlton in the semi-final, before eventually winning the match 19–17 at 1.40 am. He then beat Dennis Taylor 24–16 in the final, winning the record first prize of £10,000. Canadian Bill Werbeniuk made a break of 142 in his quarter-final match against John Virgo, equalling the championship record set by Rex Williams in South Africa in 1965.

In the 1980 Championship, the number of participants was extended to twenty-four players. Those seeded from nine to sixteen each met a qualifier in the first round, the winner meeting one of the top eight seeds in the second round. Several changes were made to accommodate the extra matches, including a reduction in the number of frames played in the final, to a maximum of thirty-five. Cliff Thorburn met Alex Higgins in the final. The match was level at 9–9 after the first day and again at 13–13 after the afternoon session on the second day. During the evening session, the score was tied once again at 16–16, before Thorburn made a 119 clearance in frame thirty-three and a break of fifty-one in frame thirty-four to win the championship.

=== Steve Davis years (1981–1989) ===
Year	Winner	Runner-up
1981	Steve Davis (ENG)^{†}	Doug Mountjoy (WAL)
1982	Alex Higgins (NIR)	Ray Reardon (WAL)
1983	Steve Davis (ENG)^{†}	Cliff Thorburn (CAN)
1984	Steve Davis (ENG)^{†}	Jimmy White (ENG)
1985	Dennis Taylor (NIR)	Steve Davis (ENG)^{†}
1986	Joe Johnson (ENG)	Steve Davis (ENG)^{†}
1987	Steve Davis (ENG)^{†}	Joe Johnson (ENG)
1988	Steve Davis (ENG)^{†}	Terry Griffiths (WAL)
1989	Steve Davis (ENG)^{†}	John Parrott (ENG)

† Steve Davis

Despite being the number thirteen seed, Steve Davis was the favourite for the 1981 Championship. He won a close match 10–8 against Jimmy White in the first round and defeated three past world champions to meet fourteenth seed Doug Mountjoy in the final. Davis won the first six frames but was only leading 10–8 at the end of the first day. He led 14–12 at the start of the final evening session and won the next four frames to win the match 18–12. At 23 years old, Davis was the second-youngest champion. Mountjoy set a new championship record with a highest break of 145 during his semi-final match against Ray Reardon.

The 1982 Championship was extended to thirty-two players with sixteen seeded players and sixteen qualifiers. There was a surprise in the first round when Tony Knowles beat defending champion Steve Davis 10–1. In the semi-finals Jimmy White was ahead 15–14, and led 59–0 in the thirtieth frame, but missed an easy red with the rest. His opponent Alex Higgins then made a sixty-nine clearance and won the deciding frame and the match 16–15. Higgins met Ray Reardon in the final. The score was 15–15 before Higgins won three frames in a row to win the championship, finishing with a clearance of 135, denying Reardon the chance to win a seventh world title.

Cliff Thorburn made the first maximum break of the World Championship in 1983 during his second-round match against Terry Griffiths. The importance of this achievement at the time is demonstrated by the fact that play was stopped on the other table. This was the break that gave the World Championship one of its most iconic words of commentary, "oh, good luck mate" on the final black, courtesy of Jack Karnehm. Thorburn beat Griffiths in a final-frame decider, a match that finished at 03:51, the latest-ever finish for a match at the Crucible. Thorburn then also won his quarter-final and semi-final matches in the deciding frame; exhausted, and deflated by the news that his wife had suffered a miscarriage, he faced a one-sided final against Steve Davis who won 18–6. The 1984 Championship final was between Steve Davis and Jimmy White (in his first final). Davis led 12–4 after the first day but White won seven of the eight frames on the final afternoon. Davis led 16–12 at the evening interval and, despite a comeback from White, Davis won 18–16.

In the 1985 final, also known as the black ball final, Dennis Taylor beat Steve Davis 18–17 on the final ball of the final frame, in one of the most closely contested matches of all time. It finished at 00:19 and, with an audience of 18.5 million, it remains the most-watched programme in the history of BBC2, and holds the record for a post-midnight audience for any channel in the United Kingdom. Davis met sixteenth seed Joe Johnson in the 1986 Championship final. Johnson led 13–11 at the start of the evening session and won five of the first six frames to win 18–12. Johnson had trailed 9–12 in his quarter-final against Terry Griffiths but won the last four frames to win 13–12. Johnson and Davis met again in the 1987 Championship final although, on this occasion, Davis was the winner by a score of 18–14.

Steve Davis and Terry Griffiths met in the 1988 Championship final. The score was 8–8 after the first day but Davis pulled ahead on the final day and won 18–11. Davis made his seventh successive final in 1989, meeting John Parrott. Davis led 13–3 after the first day and won the first five frames on the second day to win the match 18–3. As of 2025, Davis's victory in 1989 is the biggest winning margin in a World Championship final and one of only three occasions where the final has been won on the Sunday afternoon, with a session to spare. Davis won £105,000 for his 1989 victory, a new record.

=== Stephen Hendry dominates (1990–1999) ===
Year	Winner	Runner-up
1990	Stephen Hendry (SCO)^{†}	Jimmy White (ENG)
1991	John Parrott (ENG)	Jimmy White (ENG)
1992	Stephen Hendry (SCO)^{†}	Jimmy White (ENG)
1993	Stephen Hendry (SCO)^{†}	Jimmy White (ENG)
1994	Stephen Hendry (SCO)^{†}	Jimmy White (ENG)
1995	Stephen Hendry (SCO)^{†}	Nigel Bond (ENG)
1996	Stephen Hendry (SCO)^{†}	Peter Ebdon (ENG)
1997	Ken Doherty (IRL)	Stephen Hendry (SCO)^{†}
1998	John Higgins (SCO)	Ken Doherty (IRL)
1999	Stephen Hendry (SCO)^{†}	Mark Williams (WAL)

† Stephen Hendry

In 1990, Steve Davis failed to reach the final for the first time since 1982, losing in the semi-finals 14–16 to Jimmy White. Davis's seven consecutive crucible finals to this day has yet to be equalled. In the final Stephen Hendry beat White 18–12 becoming, at 21 years, 106 days, the youngest ever world champion.

Hendry was the number one seed in the 1991 tournament, but lost in the quarter-finals to Steve James. The final was between John Parrott and Jimmy White, Parrott winning 18–11.

In 1992, Jimmy White became the second player to make a maximum break in the world championship, during his 10–4 first round win over Tony Drago. Defending champion John Parrott beat Eddie Charlton 10–0, the first of only two whitewashes in the Crucible era (the second being by Shaun Murphy over Luo Honghao in 2019). Stephen Hendry met Jimmy White in the final. White led 14–8 but Hendry won ten frames in a row to win 18–14. Eight seeded players were knocked out in round one in 1992, a record which was equalled in 2012 and 2024.

James Wattana, from Thailand made history in 1993 - becoming the first Asian player to reach the semi-finals, where he lost to Jimmy White. The final was one-sided, with Stephen Hendry beating White 18–5 with a session to spare, the last time (as of 2026) that the final has been won without needing a fourth session. Total prize money reached £1,000,000 for the first time.

Jimmy White reached his sixth final in 1994, meeting Stephen Hendry for the fourth time. Hendry led 5–1 but White won six frames in a row to lead 7–5. Thereafter the match was always close and eventually went to a final frame. In the deciding frame, White had the first opportunity to finally win the title that had eluded him but missed a black off the spot when among the balls, after which Hendry made a break of fifty-eight to clinch the title. Fergal O'Brien made a century in his first frame at the Crucible, the only player ever to do so.

In 1995, Hendry and White met in the semi-finals, where Hendry won again, making a maximum break during the match. In the other semi-final Nigel Bond beat unseeded Andy Hicks. The final was initially close until Hendry won nine frames in a row to take the score from 5–5 to 14–5. Hendry eventually won 18–9. Hendry made a record twelve century breaks during the tournament.

The 1996 tournament saw Peter Ebdon reach the final, beating Jimmy White, Steve Davis and Ronnie O'Sullivan on the way. He met Stephen Hendry in the final. Ebdon led 4–2 in the early stages but Hendry eventually won 18–12 to win his fifth successive title. There were forty-eight century breaks during the final stages, a new record.

Ronnie O'Sullivan made the fastest maximum break in snooker history in 1997 - in the first round of the championship - taking just five minutes and eight seconds. The final was between Stephen Hendry and Irishman Ken Doherty. Doherty led 15–7 before Hendry won five frames in a row. Doherty then won the next three frames to win 18–12, ending Hendry's winning run of twenty-nine consecutive matches.

In 1998, Stephen Hendry lost to Jimmy White in the first round of the championship. Doherty reached the final again meeting 22-year-old John Higgins. Higgins won 18–12, making five centuries in the final. In total there were fifty-nine centuries during the tournament of which Higgins made fourteen, both records.

Stephen Hendry won his seventh and final world title at the 1999 tournament, the most in the modern era until being equalled by Ronnie O'Sullivan in 2022. In the final he beat Mark Williams 18–11. In the semi-final between Hendry and O'Sullivan each player made four century breaks including a run of four centuries in four consecutive frames, two by each player. The eight centuries were a record for a world championship match.

=== The class of '92 (2000–2013) ===
Year	Winner	Runner-up
2000	Mark Williams (WAL)^{†}	Matthew Stevens (WAL)
2001	Ronnie O'Sullivan (ENG)^{†}	John Higgins (SCO)^{†}
2002	Peter Ebdon (ENG)	Stephen Hendry (SCO)
2003	Mark Williams (WAL)^{†}	Ken Doherty (IRL)
2004	Ronnie O'Sullivan (ENG)^{†}	Graeme Dott (SCO)
2005	Shaun Murphy (ENG)	Matthew Stevens (WAL)
2006	Graeme Dott (SCO)	Peter Ebdon (ENG)
2007	John Higgins (SCO)^{†}	Mark Selby (ENG)
2008	Ronnie O'Sullivan (ENG)^{†}	Ali Carter (ENG)
2009	John Higgins (SCO)^{†}	Shaun Murphy (ENG)
2010	Neil Robertson (AUS)	Graeme Dott (SCO)
2011	John Higgins (SCO)^{†}	Judd Trump (ENG)
2012	Ronnie O'Sullivan (ENG)^{†}	Ali Carter (ENG)
2013	Ronnie O'Sullivan (ENG)^{†}	Barry Hawkins (ENG)

† Class of '92 players

The period from 2000 to 2013 was dominated by three players, who were all born in 1975 and turned professional in 1992, dubbed the "Class of '92": Ronnie O'Sullivan won five times in this period, John Higgins three times and Mark Williams twice. Higgins had also won in 1998; Williams would win again in 2018 and O'Sullivan went on to win in 2020 and 2022.

In 2000 Stephen Hendry was beaten 10–7 in the first round by Crucible debutant Stuart Bingham. In his semi-final, Mark Williams trailed 11–15 to John Higgins but took six frames in a row to win 17–15. In the final, Williams met fellow Welshman Matthew Stevens. Stevens led 13–7 but Williams made another comeback to win 18–16, becoming the first left-handed champion. 2000 was the first time (and, as of 2025 the only occasion) where the final was contested by two Welsh players.

Ronnie O'Sullivan won his first world championship in 2001, defeating John Higgins 18–14 in the final. O'Sullivan led 14–7 before Higgins won four frames in a row. O'Sullivan looked likely to win the title in the 31st frame as he led 17–13 and 69–6, however he missed a red in the middle pocket and Higgins won the frame with a break of 65. Higgins made a break of 45 in frame 32 but O'Sullivan then made an 80 break to take the title.

Stephen Hendry beat defending champion Ronnie O'Sullivan 17–13 in the semi-final of the 2002 Championship, Hendry reaching his ninth final. Peter Ebdon beat Matthew Stevens 17–16 in the other semi-final. Stevens led 16–14 but Ebdon won the last three frames, including a 138 total clearance in the penultimate frame. The final went to the deciding frame where Ebdon made a break of 59 and clinched the title. There were a record sixty-eight centuries in the tournament, including a record sixteen by Stephen Hendry who made five centuries in the semi-final and a further four in the final.

Mark Williams won his second World title in 2003 by defeating Ken Doherty 18–16 in the final. Prize money peaked in 2003 with the winner receiving a record £270,000 and the thirty-two Crucible players getting at least £15,000. Ronnie O'Sullivan made the fifth maximum break in the World Championship during his first round match against Marco Fu becoming the first player to score two 147s in the event; however O'Sullivan was defeated 10–6, becoming the first player to make a maximum break and then go on to lose the match.

Ronnie O'Sullivan won both his quarter final and semi final matches with a session to spare in 2004. This included a 17–4 victory over Hendry in the semi final, which was the biggest ever semi-final victory, replacing Hendry's 16–4 win over Terry Griffiths in 1992. O'Sullivan went on to win his second world title by defeating Graeme Dott 18–8 in the final, despite Dott having led 5–0.

Shaun Murphy won the 2005 Championship by defeating Matthew Stevens 18–16 in the final. Murphy was only the second qualifier to win the World Championship, after Terry Griffiths in 1979. Murphy won two qualifying matches and then five matches at the Crucible to take the title. Murphy was also the lowest ranked player ever to win the World Championship.

Graeme Dott beat Peter Ebdon 18–14 in the 2006 Championship final. The match finished at 00:52 am, the latest finish of a World Snooker Championship final. This was the first Championship sponsored by a betting company after the banning of tobacco sponsorship. Dott won £200,000 for his victory with the thirty-two Crucible players getting at least £9,600, both significant reductions on the 2003 prize money. In the last round of the qualifying competition Robert Milkins had the first 147 break made during qualifying for the championship. Despite his maximum, Milkins lost to Mark Selby.

The 2007 Championship was won by John Higgins who beat qualifier Mark Selby 18–13 in the final. The match finished at 00:55 am, even later than the 2006 final and setting another record for the latest finish in the final. Shaun Murphy came back from 7–12 down to win his quarter-final match against Matthew Stevens, but lost in the deciding frame of his semi-final to Mark Selby.

The 2008 Championship was won by Ronnie O'Sullivan who beat Ali Carter 18–8 in the final. Both O'Sullivan and Carter had made maximum breaks earlier in the tournament, the first time there had been two 147 breaks in the same World Championship. It was O'Sullivan's third maximum in the Championship. Although the 147s were made on consecutive days, they were made in different rounds: O'Sullivan made his maximum during a 13–7 defeat of Mark Williams in round 2 - a defeat which put former two-time champion and world number 1 Williams out of the top 16 for the following season - Carter made his 147 during his win over Peter Ebdon in the quarter finals. As a result, the prize money for a 147 was shared between both players. O'Sullivan defeated Stephen Hendry 17–6 in the semi final with a session to spare. After tying the first session 4–4, O'Sullivan completed an 8–0 whitewash over Hendry in their second session, and won the first frame of session three, meaning that O'Sullivan had won twelve consecutive frames from 1–4 down to 13–4 in front. At one point O'Sullivan scored 448 points without reply. This was the first time Hendry had lost every frame in a full session at the Crucible.

John Higgins won his third world title in 2009, beating Shaun Murphy 18–9. Michaela Tabb refereed the match, becoming the first woman to do so in a World Championship final. There were a record eighty-three century breaks in the Championship, well ahead of the previous highest of sixty-eight. Stephen Hendry won his 1000th frame at the Crucible Theatre, the first player to do so. The championship included the second longest ever frame at the Crucible which lasted seventy-four minutes fifty-eight seconds between Stephen Maguire and Mark King.

The 2010 Championship was won by Neil Robertson who beat qualifier Graeme Dott 18–13 in the final, becoming the fourth non-U.K. winner of the title after Horace Lindrum, Cliff Thorburn and Ken Doherty.

John Higgins won his fourth world title in 2011, beating Judd Trump 18–15 in the final. 21-year-old qualifier Trump became the youngest finalist since Stephen Hendry in 1990. Trump had beaten David Gilbert in the qualifying competition and then defeated defending champion Neil Robertson in the first round.

Ronnie O'Sullivan won his fourth world title in 2012, defeating Ali Carter 18–11 in the final. On the opening day Hendry made his third maximum break at the Crucible, equalling Ronnie O'Sullivan's record. He announced his retirement from professional snooker following his loss to Stephen Maguire in the quarter-finals. Aged 17 years, 45 days, Luca Brecel became the youngest player to compete at the Crucible.

Defending champion Ronnie O'Sullivan retained the title in 2013 despite having played only one competitive match all season. He defeated Barry Hawkins 18–12 in the final to win the title for the fifth time. He broke Hendry's record of 127 career Crucible centuries, finishing the tournament with 131. He also became the first player to make six century breaks in a Crucible final.

Between 1998 and 2020, seventeen of the twenty-three finals featured at least one class of '92 player.

=== Mark Selby and the veterans (2014–2022) ===
Year	Winner	Runner-up
2014	Mark Selby (ENG)^{†}	Ronnie O'Sullivan (ENG)^{‡}
2015	Stuart Bingham (ENG)	Shaun Murphy (ENG)
2016	Mark Selby (ENG)^{†}	Ding Junhui (CHN)
2017	Mark Selby (ENG)^{†}	John Higgins (SCO)^{‡}
2018	Mark Williams (WAL)^{‡}	John Higgins (SCO)^{‡}
2019	Judd Trump (ENG)	John Higgins (SCO)^{‡}
2020	Ronnie O'Sullivan (ENG)^{‡}	Kyren Wilson (ENG)
2021	Mark Selby (ENG)^{†}	Shaun Murphy (ENG)
2022	Ronnie O'Sullivan (ENG)^{‡}	Judd Trump (ENG)

† Mark Selby
‡ Class of '92 players

Mark Selby won the world title in 2014 by beating defending champion Ronnie O'Sullivan 18–14 in the final having trailed 5–10. Selby won a record £300,000 for his victory; the prize exceeding the previous highest of £270,000 in 2003, although prize money for first-round losers remained at £12,000.

Selby lost 9–13 in the second round of the 2015 Championship to Crucible debutant Anthony McGill. Stuart Bingham won the title, defeating Ronnie O'Sullivan 13–9 in the quarter-finals, Judd Trump 17–16 in the semi-finals, and Shaun Murphy 18–15 in the final to win the first world title of his twenty-year professional career. At the age of 38, Bingham became the oldest player to win the title since Ray Reardon in 1978 (although this achievement would subsequently be surpassed by 43-year-old Mark Williams in 2018, 44-year-old O'Sullivan in 2020, and 46-year-old O'Sullivan in 2022). The tournament set a new record for the most century breaks made at the Crucible, with eighty-six.

Defending champion Stuart Bingham lost 9–10 against Ali Carter in the first round of the 2016 Championship. Mark Selby defeated Ding Junhui 18–14 in the final to claim his second world title. Ding was the first Asian player to reach a World Championship final. There were eighty-six century breaks made during the Championship, equalling the record set in 2015. A new record of ten centuries in a professional match was set in the semi-final between Ding Junhui and Alan McManus, with Ding also setting a new record of seven centuries by one player in a World Championship match. Mark Selby and Marco Fu set a new record for the longest frame of snooker ever played at the Crucible, seventy six minutes eleven seconds.

Prize money for the 2017 Championship was a record £1,750,000 with the winner receiving £375,000. Prize money for first-round losers was a record £16,000, exceeding the £15,000 players received in 2003. In a high-quality and tightly contested semi-final, defending champion Mark Selby beat Ding Junhui 17–15 in a repeat of the previous year's final. Selby met John Higgins, in a repeat of the 2007 Championship final. Higgins was the second oldest Crucible finalist at 41 years, 348 days; only Ray Reardon had been older. Selby trailed 4–10 during the second session but then won twelve of the next fourteen frames to lead 16–12. Higgins won the next three frames but Selby took the title 18–15, becoming champion for the third time in four years, joining Steve Davis, Stephen Hendry, and Ronnie O'Sullivan as the only men to have successfully defended the title since its move to the Crucible.

In 2018, two "class of '92" players, Mark Williams and John Higgins, met in the final. Their rivalry dated back to the late 1990s, although only three of their meetings had been in the World Championships, all in semi finals, in 1999, 2000 (both won by Williams 17–15) and 2011 (won by Higgins 17–14). The match was closely contested, Williams coming out on top by 18–16 to win the World Championship for the first time since 2003, setting a new record for the longest gap between World Championship victories. He won £425,000.

Higgins reached the final again in 2019, only to be beaten 18–9 by Judd Trump, who won £500,000. Their final set records for the most century breaks in a professional match, with 11, beating the previous record of 10 set in the 2016 semi-final between Ding Junhui and Alan McManus. It also set a record for the most centuries in a Crucible final, bettering the previous record of eight, set in 2002 when Stephen Hendry played Peter Ebdon, and equalled in 2013 when O'Sullivan played Barry Hawkins. Trump set a new record for the most centuries by a player in a world final, achieving seven to better O'Sullivan's six centuries in the 2013 final. This ties with the most centuries by a player in a crucible match, set by Ding in 2016 in the semi-finals. The tournament also recorded a record 100 century breaks.

The 2020 championship was postponed as a result of the COVID-19 pandemic, finishing on 16 August instead of the originally planned date of 4 May. Ronnie O'Sullivan made a record 28th consecutive appearance at the Crucible and won the championship for the sixth time, beating Kyren Wilson 18–8 in the final, and collecting prize money of £500,000. It was O'Sullivan's 37th ranking title, passing the record of 36 ranking titles won by Stephen Hendry. John Higgins made the first 147 break at the Crucible since 2012, earning him the £15,000 highest break prize plus an additional £40,000 bonus for achieving a maximum.

At the 2021 event, O'Sullivan was knocked out in the second round by Anthony McGill in a final-frame decider. Judd Trump and Neil Robertson both fell in the quarter-finals. Selby met Murphy in the final, and won 18–15.

At the 2022 event, O'Sullivan equalled Steve Davis's record of 30 Crucible appearances. The Class of '92 — O'Sullivan, Higgins, and Williams — all reached the semi-finals for the first time since 1999. O'Sullivan defeated Trump 18–13 in the final to win his seventh world title, equalling Hendry's modern-era record. Aged 46 years and 148 days, he became the oldest world champion in the tournament's history, surpassing Reardon, who was aged 45 years and 203 days when he won his last title in 1978. O'Sullivan also surpassed Hendry's record of 70 Crucible wins, setting a new record of 74. The second-round match between Selby and Yan Bingtao featured the longest frame ever played at the Crucible, at 85 minutes. Dott made a maximum break in the qualifying rounds, and Robertson made a maximum in his second-round match against Lisowski, becoming the eighth player to make a 147 at the Crucible. A new record of 109 century breaks was set at the Crucible stage, one more than the 108 made the previous year. Williams made 16 centuries during the event, equalling the record for the most centuries in a single championship set by Hendry in 2002.

=== New generation breaks through (2023–) ===
Year	Winner	Runner-up
2023	Luca Brecel (BEL)^{†}	Mark Selby (ENG)
2024	Kyren Wilson (ENG)^{†}	Jak Jones (WAL)
2025	Zhao Xintong (CHN)^{†}	Mark Williams (WAL)
2026	Wu Yize (CHN)^{†}	Shaun Murphy (ENG)

† New Champion

During the 2023 event, play in a first-round match between Robert Milkins and Joe Perry was suspended when a male protester wearing a Just Stop Oil T-shirt ran into the arena, climbed onto the table and covered it in an orange powder. A second person tried to attach themselves to the second table but was removed by referee Olivier Marteel and security. Luca Brecel became the first continental European to win the title, having never previously won a match at the Crucible; after close victories in the first two rounds (over Ricky Walden 10–9 and Mark Williams 13–11), he overturned a 6–10 deficit to beat O'Sullivan 13–10 in the quarter-finals, pulled off an even bigger comeback from 5–14 down to beat Si Jiahui 17–15 in the semi-final, which is the biggest comeback in Crucible history, and finally defeated Selby 18–15 in the final to win his first world title.

Four years after finishing runner-up to O'Sullivan, Kyren Wilson won his first world title at the 2024 event, defeating qualifier Jak Jones 18‍–‍14 in the final.

At the 2025 event, having returned to competition after serving a 20-month ban for match-fixing offences, Zhao Xintong became the first Chinese player and first Asian player to win the world title. Competing in the tournament as an amateur, he won four qualifying matches to reach the main stage. He defeated seven-time winner Ronnie O'Sullivan 17‍–‍7 with a session to spare in the semi-finals and defeated three-time winner Mark Williams 18–12 in the final, becoming the fourth qualifier to win the World Championship. He was the youngest winner since Murphy in 2005.

== Format ==
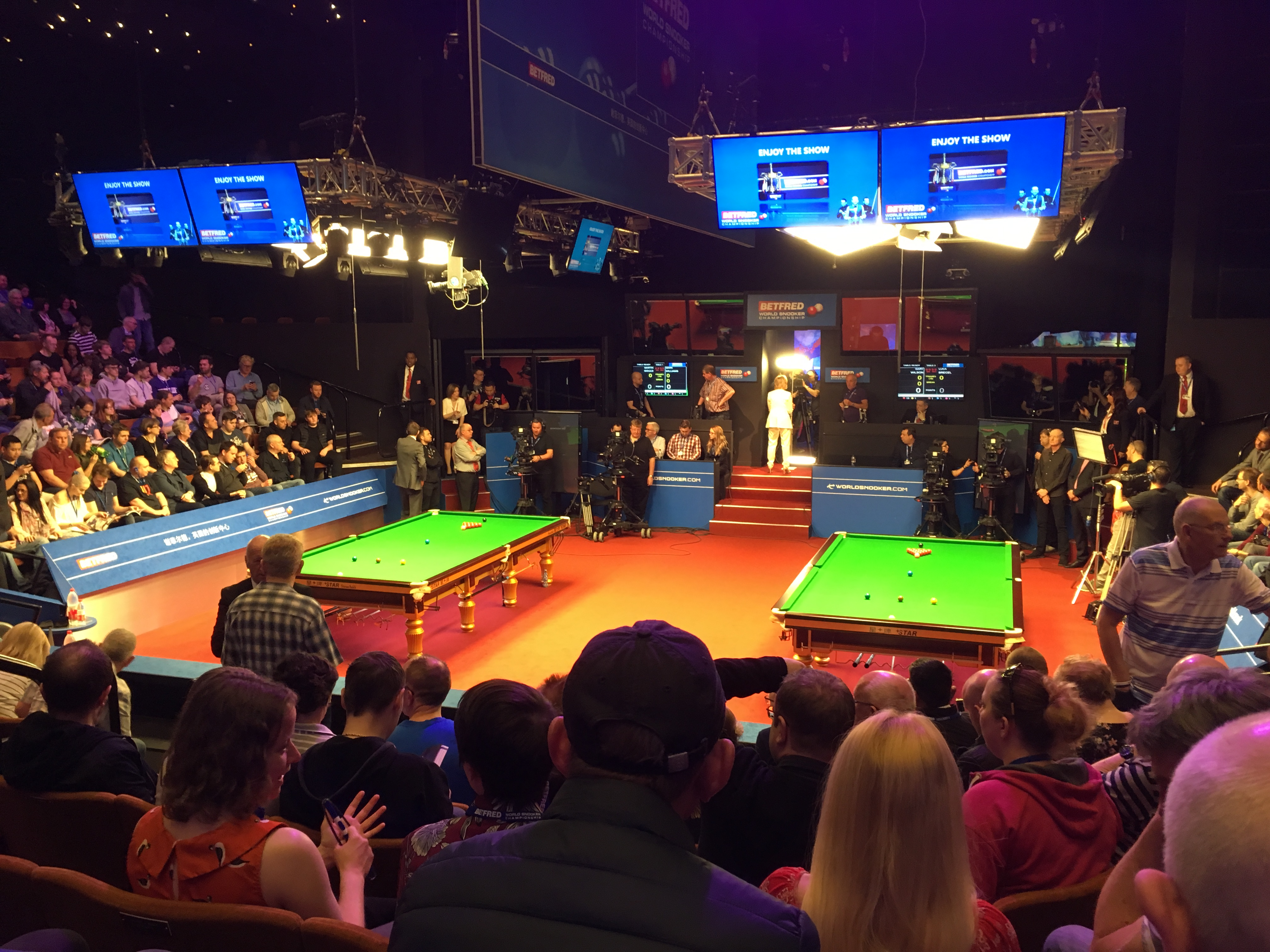
The two-table setup at the 2019 event

The televised stages of the World Championship have used the same format since 1982, with the exception of a change to the semi-final format that was introduced in 1997. The main competition is a single-elimination (knockout) tournament with 32 players, contested over 17 days ending on the first Monday in May, which is the May Day bank holiday in the United Kingdom. Of the 32 players, 16 are seeded automatically into the main draw and the other 16 need to earn a place through a qualifying competition, which takes place immediately before the main competition but at a separate venue. The reigning world champion receives a direct entry and is the number one seed in the draw. The other 15 direct entries are based on the latest world rankings, these players being seeded according to their world ranking positions. As the defending champion is usually a player that is ranked in the top 16, it is normally the top 16 ranked players that receive a direct entry to the main competition (if the defending champion is outside the top 16, then the top 15 ranked players receive a direct entry in addition to the defending champion).

Before 1982, there were a number of formats used for the championship. In 1980 and 1981, 24 players competed in the final stages at the Crucible; the top eight seeds had a bye in the first round while seeds 9 to 16 played in the first round against eight qualifiers. From 1977 to 1979, the first three years at the Crucible, there were only 16 players in the final stages, eight seeds playing eight qualifiers in the first round. For information on the players involved, see list of players to appear in the World Snooker Championship.

The length of the matches varies per round as follows: the first round is played as the best of 19 frames, spread over two sessions of play; the second round and the quarter-finals are the best of 25 frames, played over three sessions; the semi-finals are the best of 33 frames, played over four sessions on three consecutive days of play; and the final is a maximum of 35 frames, over four sessions on two consecutive days of play. For the first 12 days of the tournament, until the end of the quarter-final stage, two tables are set up in the arena to allow two matches to be played concurrently. For the last five days of the competition (the semi-finals and final), only one table is used.

From 1980 to 1996, the semi-finals were played as the best of 31 frames, and this was changed to the best of 33 frames from 1997 onwards. Since first becoming a 17-day event in 1982, the World Championship has nearly always ended on the first Monday in May, with five exceptions. In 1982, the tournament ended on Sunday 16 May, and it ended on the last Sunday of April in 1985, 1990 and 1995; in all of these cases, the event started on a Friday rather than a Saturday. The fifth and most recent instance of the tournament starting on a Friday was the 2020 edition: because of a delay caused by the COVID-19 pandemic, the main competition was played over 17 days from Friday 31 July to Sunday 16 August.

Several changes to the qualifying system came into effect for the 2015 championship. All living world champions would be extended an opportunity to play in the qualifying rounds. The top 16 seeds would still qualify automatically for the first round at the Crucible, but all non-seeded players would have to start in the first of three qualifying rounds. Previously players seeded 17 to 32 only had to win one qualifying match to reach the final stages. The overall championship would increase from 128 to 144 players, with the additional places made available to former world champions and players from emerging countries.

In 2020, another significant change was made to the qualifying competition for the World Championship. Whereas in previous years, the qualifying rounds were played like a mini-tournament (with all seeded players playing an unseeded player in the first round), with the 16 "winners" being the qualifiers to go to the main draw using traditional knockout format, the new system involved seeding the players based on their world ranking. Players seeded 1–32 (representing 17–48 in the world rankings) would join the qualifying later than those who were seeded lower, or unseeded. The lowest-ranked and those who were invited as amateurs played in Round 1, with the winner moving on to play in Round 2 against a seeded player from 49 to 80 in the world rankings. In addition to the format change, the 2020 qualifying round became the first qualifying tournament to be broadcast on television in the history of snooker. Previously, only the Judgement Day round was broadcast on World Snooker's social media platforms.

Since the 2020 tournament was held during the height of the global COVID-19 pandemic, Rounds 1–3 were played as a single session best-of-11 frames match, with only the "Judgement Day" final round played with the usual best-of-19 system. This change to the length of matches persisted into the 2021 and 2022 championships for the same reasons. From 2023, the match length of the qualifying rounds reverted to the previous incarnation of best-of-19's, but the seeded format remains in place.

== Winners and finalists ==
From its foundation in 1927, the world snooker championship was dominated by Joe Davis, who won each of the first 15 tournaments before retiring undefeated in 1946. In 1952, a dispute between the BACC and the PBPA led to the formation of the World Professional Match-play Championship, whose winners are generally acknowledged as world champions. No championship was held between 1957 and 1964, when it was revived on a challenge basis until 1968.

The 'modern' era is considered to have started in 1969, when the championship reverted to a knock-out tournament format from a challenge format. Since then, the best record is seven wins, by Stephen Hendry (1990–1999) and Ronnie O'Sullivan (2001–2022). Ray Reardon won six times in the 1970s, while Steve Davis won six times in the 1980s.

Stephen Hendry is the youngest champion in the tournament's history, winning his first title in 1990 aged 21 years and 106 days. Ronnie O'Sullivan became the oldest champion in 2022 when he won his seventh title aged 46 years and 148 days. Ronnie O'Sullivan also holds the record for the most Crucible appearances with 34, having taken part in the tournament every year between 1993 and 2026.

As of 2026, 92 editions of the World Championship have been staged and 30 players have won the Championship.

Name	Sport country	Winner	Runner-up	Finals	Semi-final or better	Quarter-final or better	Appearances
Joe Davis	England	15	0	15	15	15	15
Fred Davis	England	8	6	14	20	25	31
John Pulman (Note: John Pulman won the (unsanctioned) World Professional Match-play Championship in 1957 and then defended his title seven times in BACC-sanctioned challenge matches between 1964 and 1968. This effectively made him an eight-time world champion over the 11-year period from 1957 to 1968.)	England	8	3	11	16	20	28
Stephen Hendry	Scotland	7	2	9	12	19	27
**Ronnie O'Sullivan**	England	7	1	8	14	23	34
Steve Davis	England	6	2	8	11	15	30
Ray Reardon	Wales	6	1	7	10	16	19
**John Higgins**	Scotland	4	4	8	12	20	32
**Mark Selby**	England	4	2	6	8	10	22
**Mark Williams**	Wales	3	2	5	8	12	28
John Spencer	England	3	1	4	6	8	18
Walter Donaldson	Scotland	2	6	8	10	12	12
Alex Higgins	Northern Ireland	2	2	4	7	9	19
**Shaun Murphy**	England	1	4	5	6	10	24
Horace Lindrum (Note: In 1952, most professional players boycotted the official world championship and instead played in the rival World Professional Match-play Championship. As Horace Lindrum and Clark McConachy were the only two players to contest the official championship that year, Lindrum's title win is not always recognised.)	Australia	1	3	4	6	7	7
Cliff Thorburn	Canada	1	2	3	6	11	19
**Judd Trump**	England	1	2	3	6	11	17
Peter Ebdon	England	1	2	3	4	10	24
Ken Doherty	Ireland	1	2	3	3	8	19
Graeme Dott	Scotland	1	2	3	3	4	20
Dennis Taylor	Northern Ireland	1	1	2	5	9	21
**Kyren Wilson**	England	1	1	2	4	7	12
John Parrott	England	1	1	2	3	11	23
Terry Griffiths	Wales	1	1	2	3	11	19
Joe Johnson	England	1	1	2	2	2	8
**Neil Robertson**	Australia	1	0	1	3	10	21
**Stuart Bingham**	England	1	0	1	3	5	18
**Luca Brecel**	Belgium	1	0	1	1	2	8
**Zhao Xintong**	China	1	0	1	1	2	4
**Wu Yize**	China	1	0	1	1	1	3
**Jimmy White**	England	0	6	6	10	15	25
Tom Dennis	England	0	4	4	6	7	7
Eddie Charlton	Australia	0	3	3	8	11	21
**Matthew Stevens**	Wales	0	2	2	6	9	19
Sidney Smith	England	0	2	2	6	8	9
Rex Williams	England	0	2	2	5	8	17
Willie Smith	England	0	2	2	4	6	6
**Ali Carter**	England	0	2	2	3	6	22
Clark McConachy	New Zealand	0	2	2	3	4	4
**Barry Hawkins**	England	0	1	1	5	7	20
Jackie Rea	Northern Ireland	0	1	1	4	8	10
Tom Newman	England	0	1	1	3	8	10
**Ding Junhui**	China	0	1	1	3	6	20
Fred Lawrence	England	0	1	1	3	4	4
Nigel Bond	England	0	1	1	2	4	15
Gary Owen	Wales	0	1	1	2	4	7
Perrie Mans	South Africa	0	1	1	2	3	13
Graham Miles	England	0	1	1	1	4	12
Doug Mountjoy	Wales	0	1	1	1	3	17
**Jak Jones**	Wales	0	1	1	1	2	4
Warren Simpson	Australia	0	1	1	1	1	4
Fred Van Rensburg	South Africa	0	1	1	1	1	1

- Active players are shown in **bold**.
- Only players who reached the final are included.
- **Appearances** relates to appearances in the final stages, excluding qualifying match.
- In the event of identical records, players are sorted in alphabetical order by family name.

== Sponsorship ==
Except for two championships played in Australia, all championships from 1969 to 2005 were sponsored by tobacco companies. In 1969 and 1970 the championship was sponsored by John Player under the brand Player's No.6. The Gallaher Group sponsored under the brand Park Drive from 1972 to 1974, while from 1976 to 2005 Imperial Tobacco sponsored under the brand Embassy. Legislation in 2003 placed restrictions on tobacco advertising, including sponsorship of sporting events. Embassy received special dispensation to continue snooker sponsorship until 2005.

From 2006 to 2022, all championships were sponsored by betting companies. In 2006, 888.com took over sponsorship of the event under a five-year deal, but it pulled out after just three years. Betfred.com was the sponsor from 2009 to 2012, followed by Betfair in 2013, Dafabet in 2014, and Betfred again from 2015 to 2022.

Online car retailer Cazoo signed a multi-year deal to sponsor the tournament from 2023.

In 2025, UK workflow automation software company Halo became the tournament's new sponsor.

== Television coverage ==
Before the world championship moved to the Crucible in 1977, TV coverage was very limited. In the 1950s, the BBC occasionally showed snooker on black and white television, including 30-minute programmes of the 1953 and 1955 finals, with commentary by Sidney Smith. Despite the launch of Pot Black in colour in 1969, there was little coverage of the World Championship. There was some coverage of the 1973, 1974 and 1976 world championships in Manchester on two Saturday afternoon Grandstand programmes during those three years. Commentary was by Ted Lowe.

BBC TV coverage for the first Crucible championship in 1977 was increased but was limited to highlights of the semi-finals and some coverage of the final on Grandstand and a late night highlights programme. The commentator was Ted Lowe with the highlight programmes presented by Alan Weeks. The 1978 championship was the first to have daily BBC TV coverage with 14 nightly highlights programmes as well as Saturday afternoon coverage on Grandstand. Ted Lowe commentated while the programmes were presented by David Vine and Alan Weeks. In 1979, TV coverage was extended to include an early-evening "Frame of the Day" as well as live coverage of parts of the final. David Vine was the presenter while the commentary team was extended to include Jack Karnehm and Clive Everton. In 1980, TV coverage included daily live coverage for the first time. Coverage of the final was interrupted to bring live coverage of the Iranian Embassy Siege.

David Vine continued to be the main anchor for the BBC's TV coverage until 2000, with David Icke as prominent deputy presenter from 1984 to 1990, then Dougie Donnelly and occasionally Eamonn Holmes through the 1990s. For some years, commentary was primarily by Ted Lowe, Clive Everton and Jack Karnehm although John Pulman, Vera Selby and others were used. In 1986 Jim Meadowcroft, John Spencer and John Virgo were used as summarisers. From 2002 to 2009, the BBC coverage was hosted by Hazel Irvine or Ray Stubbs. Irvine took over as main anchor in 2010 with highlights presented by Rishi Persad.

In February 2013, the BBC announced that Persad had been replaced by Jason Mohammad, who later stepped down from those duties after the conclusion of the 2020 tournament and was replaced by Seema Jaswal. Persad returned as deputy presenter, joined in 2023 by Catrin Heledd from BBC Wales. Commentators have included Willie Thorne, Dennis Taylor, John Virgo, John Parrott, Steve Davis, Ken Doherty, Stephen Hendry, Terry Griffiths and Neal Foulds.

As of 2023 the BBC holds the broadcast rights to the tournament until 2027. In 2025, Sunset+Vine replaced IMG as producer of BBC Sport's snooker coverage under a three-year agreement.

== See also ==
- Crucible curse – A "curse" for all first-time winners of the event, since it moved to the Crucible Theatre
- List of snooker ranking tournaments
