= Bill Camkin =

English football administrator (1894–1956)

Personal information
- Born: 1894 England
- Died: 25 April 1956 (aged 61–62)

Sport
- Country: England
- Sport: Snooker
- Professional: 1927–1930

William Alexander Camkin (1894 – 26 April 1956) was an English billiard hall owner who came to prominence in the early years of the World Snooker Championship, when many of the tournament's matches were held at his clubs.

He was involved in various aspects of billiards and snooker, initially renovating and supplying tables and later supplying equipment and promoting events and refereeing matches. During the Second World War he acted as secretary-manager of Birmingham City F.C.

== Birth ==
Camkin was born in Willesden, London.

== Camkin's Hall ==
Camkin ran a billiards hall on John Bright Street, Birmingham known as Camkin's Hall. This hall was used for a number of World Snooker Championship matches from 1927 to 1930, including the 1927 and 1928 finals. Camkin himself was the referee for the 1927 final. In 1928 it was the first venue outside London to be used for the final stages of the English Amateur Championship.

== Birmingham City F.C. ==
Camkin was appointed honorary managing-director of Birmingham F.C. in September 1939, and when W. H. Grady died in 1941, took over secretarial duties in addition. Team manager George Liddell had resigned on the outbreak of war, and Camkin, together with trainer George Blackburn, oversaw team affairs until November 1944, when Ted Goodier took over as caretaker manager. Although the Football League was suspended for the duration of hostilities, Birmingham competed in regional league and cup matches. Camkin remained on the club's board of directors until ill-health forced his retirement in 1951, when he was elected as vice-president of the club.

== Death ==
Camkin died at his home in Leamington, Warwickshire on 26 April 1956 aged 61.

== Family ==
His son John Camkin, a journalist and broadcaster, who lived in Leamington Spa served on the board of Coventry City and was secretary of the League Managers Association. In the 1970s he owned a string of travel agencies (Camkin Travel) in the Midlands that were eventually sold to the Lunn Poly/Thomson Group.
