= Billiard hall =

Facility where cue games are played

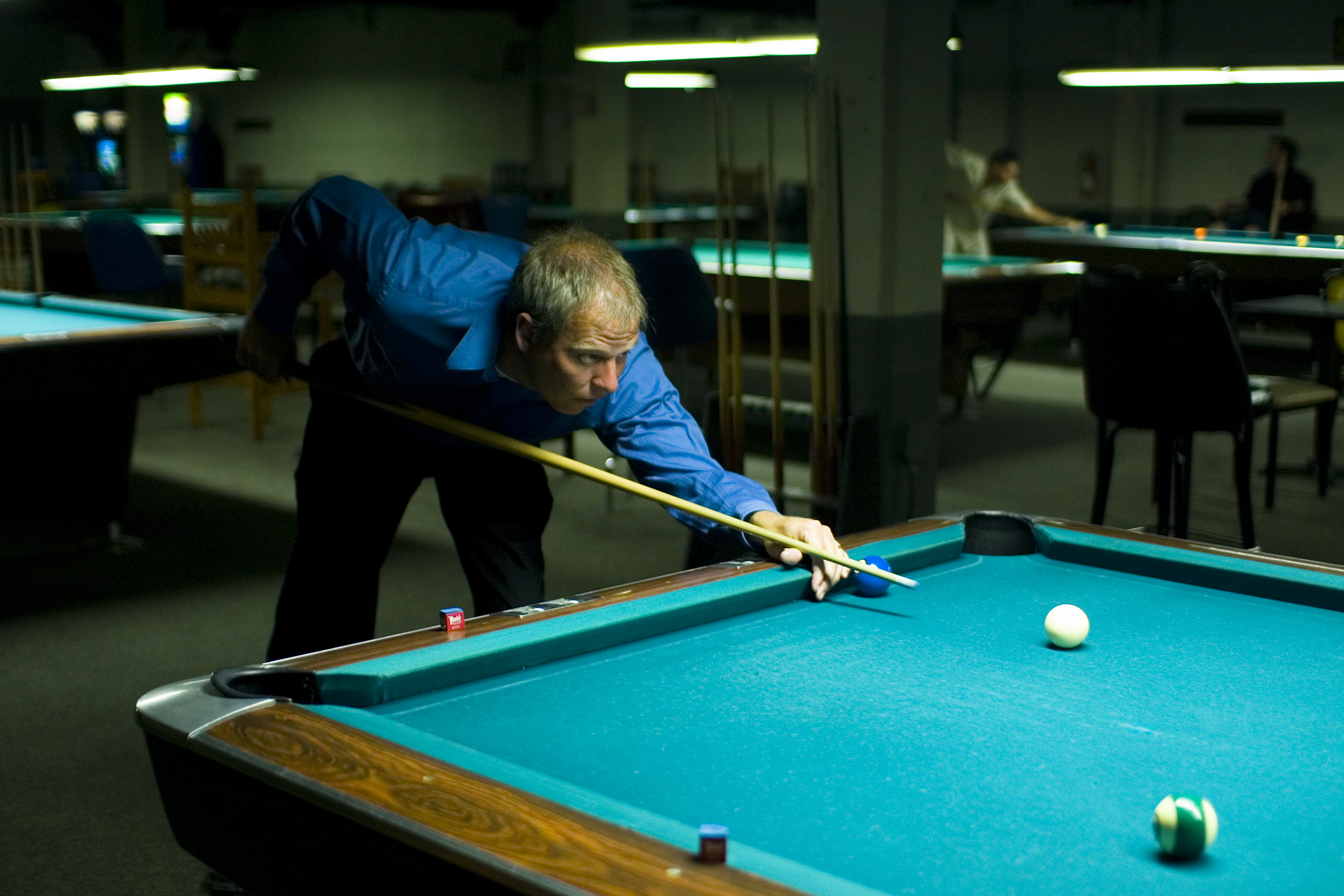
A pool hall in Chicago, Chris's Billiards, where parts of The Color of Money were shot

A billiard hall, also known as a pool hall, snooker hall, pool room or pool parlour, is a place where people get together for playing cue sports such as pool, snooker or carom billiards. Such establishments commonly serve alcohol and often have arcade games, slot machines, card games, darts, foosball and other games. Some billiard halls may be combined or integrated with a bowling alley.

== History ==
Pool and billiards developed as an indoor option to substitute for games such as croquet that were played on lawns. Dedicated venues began to appear in the 19th century, and by the early 20th century, billiard and pool halls were common in many countries; in 1915 there were 830 in Chicago.

In North America in the 1950s and 1960s especially, pool halls in particular were perceived as a social ill by many, and laws were passed in many jurisdictions to set age limits at pool halls and restrict gambling and the sale of alcohol. The song "Trouble" in the 1957 hit musical The Music Man lampooned this prejudice (even contrasting carom billiards, requiring "judgement, brains, and maturity", versus pool, said to be a gateway to laziness, gambling, smoking and philandering). Public perception had become less critical by the 1990s.

By the 2010s, with competition from a growing number of competing entertainment venues, as well as the availability of online gambling, revenue from the operation of billiard halls in the United States had declined significantly. In Korea, on the other hand, the pool halls are becoming more popular after years of decline.
