= US Nationals =

US Nationals may refer to:

- United States Championships (disambiguation) (sporting events)
- U.S. nationals, people who owe allegiance to the U.S. but are not U.S. citizens, mostly found in American Samoa
