= 2025 World Snooker Championship =

Snooker tournament in Sheffield, England

2025 Halo World Snooker Championship

Tournament information
- Dates: 19 April – 5 May 2025
- Venue: Crucible Theatre
- City: Sheffield
- Country: England
- Organisation: World Snooker Tour
- Format: Ranking event
- Total prize fund: £2,395,000
- Winner's share: £500,000
- Highest break: Mark Allen (NIR) (147); Jackson Page (WAL) (147 x2)

Final
- Champion: Zhao Xintong (CHN)
- Runner-up: Mark Williams (WAL)
- Score: 18–12

The 2025 World Snooker Championship (officially the 2025 Halo World Snooker Championship) was a professional snooker tournament that took place from 19 April to 5 May 2025 at the Crucible Theatre in Sheffield, England, the 49th consecutive year the World Snooker Championship was staged at the venue. Qualifying took place from 7 to 16 April at the English Institute of Sport in Sheffield. Organised by the World Snooker Tour and broadcast by BBC Sport in the UK, Eurosport in Europe, and other broadcasters globally, it was the 18th and final ranking event of the 2024–25 season. The winner received £500,000 from a total prize fund of £2,395,000.

A then-record ten Chinese players reached the main stage, while three players, Lei Peifan, Zak Surety, and Daniel Wells, made their Crucible debuts. Kyren Wilson was the defending champion, having defeated Jak Jones 18–14 in the 2024 final to win his maiden world title, but he lost 9–10 to Lei in the first round, becoming the 20th player to experience the Crucible curse. Competing as an amateur after serving a 20-month ban, Zhao Xintong won four qualifying matches to reach the main stage. He beat Ronnie O'Sullivan 17–7 in the semi-finals and Mark Williams 18–12 in the final to become the first world champion from Asia. He was the fourth qualifier to win the title, after Alex Higgins, Terry Griffiths, and Shaun Murphy. At 50, Williams became the oldest world finalist, surpassing Ray Reardon, who had been 49 at the 1982 final.

The qualifying rounds produced a then-record 143 century breaks, and the main stage produced 107. Zhao made 18 centuries across qualifying and the main stage combined, equalling the record set by Ding Junhui at the 2016 event. In the third qualifying round, Jackson Page became the first player to make two maximum breaks in a professional match. In the second round, Mark Allen made the 15th Crucible maximum, bringing the season's total to a then-record 15. Judd Trump finished the season with a record 107 centuries, surpassing Neil Robertson's previous season record of 103. Dominic Dale and Joe Perry, both professionals since 1992, retired after the tournament.

== Background ==
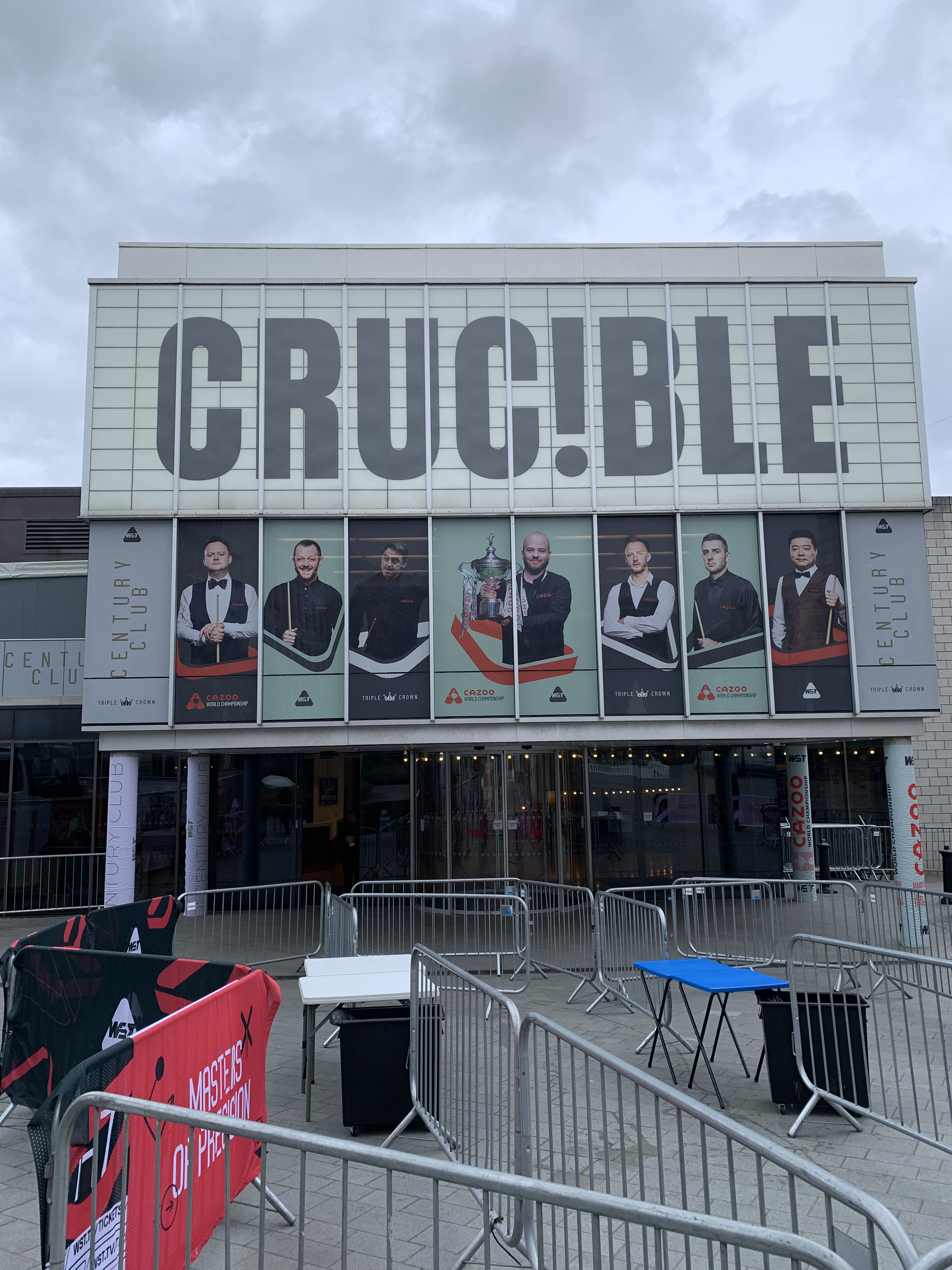
For the 49th consecutive year, the main stage of the tournament was held at the Crucible Theatre (pictured in 2024) in Sheffield, England.

The inaugural 1927 World Snooker Championship, then known as the Professional Championship of Snooker, took place at various venues in England between November 1926 and May 1927. Joe Davis won the final—held at Camkin's Hall in Birmingham from 9 to 12 May 1927—and went on to win the tournament 15 consecutive times before retiring undefeated after the 1946 edition (no tournaments were held from 1941 to 1945 because of World War II). The tournament went into abeyance after only two players contested the 1952 edition. The six editions of the World Professional Match-play Championship held between 1952 and 1957 are retroactively regarded as legitimate continuations of the World Snooker Championship, but that tournament was discontinued due to waning public interest in snooker in the post-war era. The world title was uncontested between 1958 and 1963.

Then-professional player Rex Williams was instrumental in reviving the World Snooker Championship on a challenge basis in 1964. John Pulman, winner of the 1957 World Professional Match-play Championship, defended the world title across seven challenge matches between 1964 and 1968. The World Snooker Championship reverted to an annual knockout tournament for the 1969 edition, marking the beginning of the championship's "modern era". The 1977 edition was the first staged at the Crucible Theatre in Sheffield, where it has remained since. The most successful players in the modern era are Stephen Hendry and Ronnie O'Sullivan, each having won the title seven times.

== Overview ==
The 2025 event was organised by the World Snooker Tour and sponsored for the first time by technology company Halo Service Solutions. It was the 18th and final ranking event of the 2024–25 snooker season. The event marked the 49th consecutive year that the tournament was held at the Crucible Theatre and the 57th successive year that the World Championship was contested through the modern knockout format. It marked the 40th anniversary of one of snooker's most famous matches, the 1985 World Championship final between Dennis Taylor and Steve Davis, in which Taylor recovered from losing the first eight frames to win the deciding frame on the last black ball. On 17 April, the inaugural Champions' Dinner took place in Sheffield, modelled on the Masters Champions' Dinner held annually since 1952 at the Augusta National Golf Club before the Masters Tournament. Attendees paid tribute to the six-time champion Ray Reardon and the 1979 winner Terry Griffiths, who both had died since the previous year's tournament.

=== Format ===
The top 16 players in the snooker world rankings, as they stood after the 2025 Tour Championship, were seeded through to the main stage of the tournament. Qualifying took place from 7 to 16 April at the English Institute of Sport in Sheffield, featuring 128 players, 16 of whom also reached the main stage. The qualifiers were held over four rounds, with players ranked 49 to 80 seeded through to the second qualifying round, and players ranked 17 to 48 seeded through to the third qualifying round. All qualifying matches were played as the best of 19 frames, held over two sessions. The first-round draw, during which the 16 successful qualifiers were drawn at random against the top 16 seeds, was held on 17 April, broadcast on BBC Radio 5 Live and the BBC Sport website. The main stage of the tournament took place from 19 April to 5 May at the Crucible Theatre. First-round matches were played as the best of 19 frames, held over two sessions. Second-round and quarter-final matches were played as the best of 25 frames, held over three sessions. The semi-final matches were played as the best of 33 frames, held over four sessions. The final was the best of 35 frames, also held over four sessions.

=== Broadcasters ===
The qualifying rounds were broadcast by Discovery+ in the United Kingdom, Germany, Italy, and Austria; by Max in other European territories; by Huya, Migu, the CBSA-WPBSA Academy WeChat Channel, and CBSA-WPBSA Academy Douyin in China; and by WST Play in all other territories. The final round of qualifying, billed as "Judgement Day", was broadcast for free on WST Play on 15 and 16 April.

The main stage was broadcast by BBC Sport, TNT Sports, and Discovery+ in the United Kingdom and TNT Sports in Ireland. It was broadcast by Eurosport in Europe; by Discovery+ in Germany, Italy, and Austria; by HBO Max in the Netherlands; and by Max in other European territories (excluding the United Kingdom and Ireland). It was broadcast by Migu, Huya, the CBSA-WPBSA Academy WeChat Channel, and CBSA-WPBSA Academy Douyin in mainland China; by Now TV in Hong Kong; by Astro SuperSport in Malaysia and Brunei; by TrueVisions in Thailand; by Sportcast in Taiwan; by TAP Sports in the Philippines; by Sportstars/Vision+ in Indonesia; by StarHub in Singapore; by Anten in Iran; and by WST Play in all other territories. The quarter-finals, semi-finals, and final were broadcast on Sky Sport in New Zealand. The final was broadcast on CCTV-5 in China.

The BBC reported that its domestic online viewership figures—via the BBC iPlayer, the BBC Sport website and the BBC Sport app—increased by 25 per cent over the previous year's event. It reported peak television viewership of 3 million on BBC Two during the final, an audience share of 22.5 per cent. The BBC's average television audience for live sessions across the tournament increased 6.5 per cent over the previous year. It was reported by The Guardian that 150 million people in China watched the final.

=== Prize fund ===
The winner of the event received £500,000 from a total prize fund of £2,395,000. The breakdown of prize money is shown below:

- Winner: £500,000
- Runner-up: £200,000
- Semi-finalists: £100,000
- Quarter-finalists: £50,000
- Last 16: £30,000
- Last 32: £20,000
- Last 48: £15,000
- Last 80: £10,000
- Last 112: £5,000
- Highest break (qualifying stage included): £15,000
- Total: £2,395,000

In addition to the highest break prize, bonuses of £40,000 and £10,000 were offered for maximum breaks made at the main stage and in the qualifying rounds respectively. An additional bonus of £147,000 was on offer to any player who made two maximums across that season's Triple Crown events (the 2024 UK Championship, the 2025 Masters, and the 2025 World Championship) and the 2024 Saudi Arabia Snooker Masters.

== Summary ==
=== Qualification ===
==== First qualification round ====
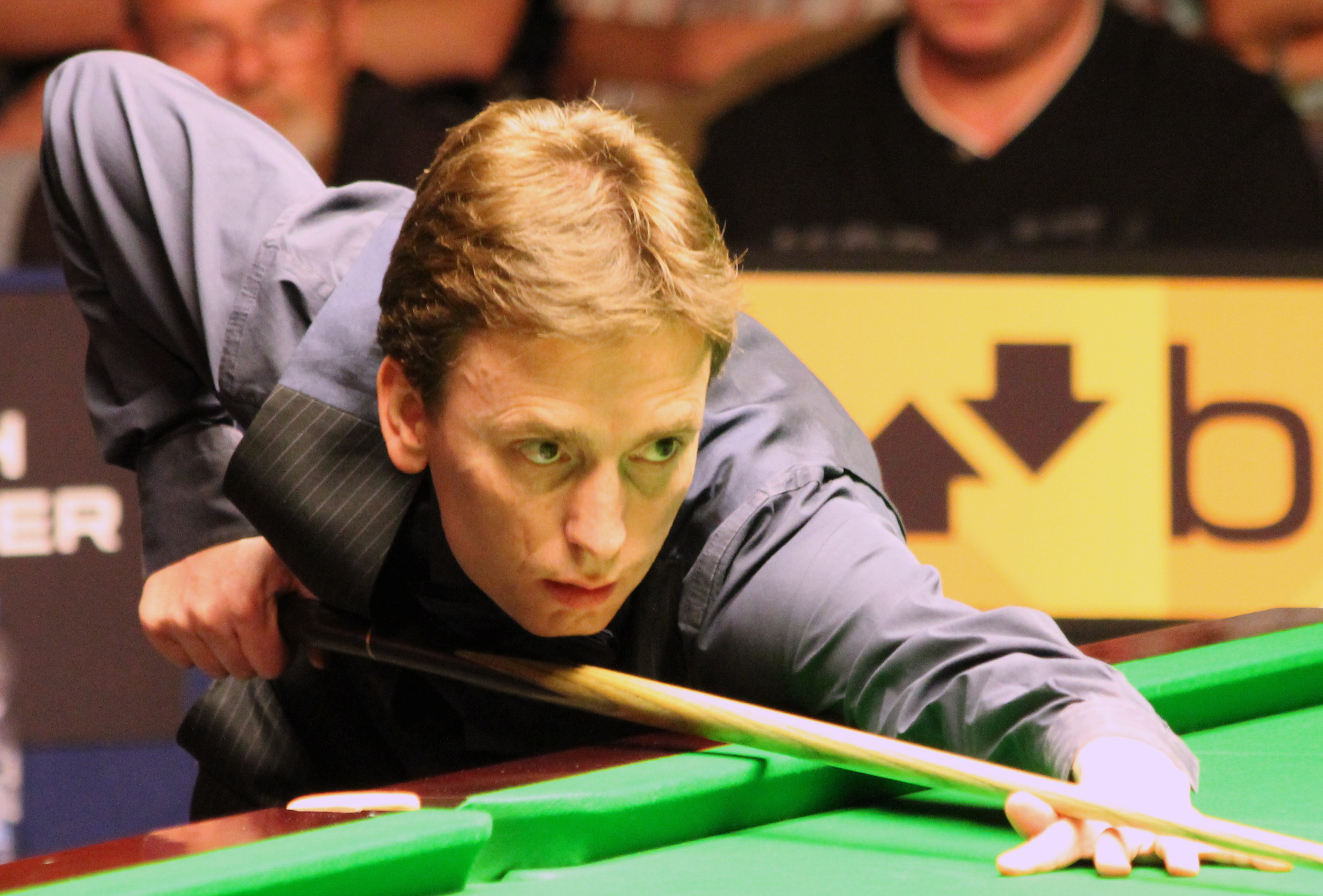
The 1997 winner Ken Doherty (pictured in 2012) won all nine frames of his first session at the tournament, having changed his cue for the first time in his career.

The first qualifying round was played from 7 to 9 April, featuring players ranked 81 to 112 against players seeded 113 to 144, including amateurs selected by the World Professional Billiards and Snooker Association (WPBSA). The tournament featured four female players, all of whom lost in the first qualifying round: Reanne Evans lost 4–10 to Antoni Kowalski, Mink Nutcharut lost 4–10 to Ian Burns, Baipat Siripaporn lost 2–10 to Farakh Ajaib, and Bai Yulu lost 3–10 to Liam Highfield. Zhao Xintong was playing in his first World Championship since the 2022 event, having returned to competition in September 2024 after serving a 20-month ban. He was competing in the tournament as an amateur, although he had recently earned a professional tour card for the following two seasons by topping the 2024‍–25 Q Tour Europe ranking list, after winning four consecutive Q Tour events. He made four century breaks (128, 122, 132, and 141) and five other half-centuries as he defeated Cheung Ka Wai 10–3. Michał Szubarczyk, aged 14, attempted to become the youngest player to reach the main stage at the Crucible, but he lost 8–10 to Dean Young.

Competing in his 45th World Championship, six-time runner-up Jimmy White, who had last reached the main stage at the 2006 event, faced Anton Kazakov, a player 42 years his junior. Despite losing the third frame due to the three-miss rule and falling 3–7 behind, White took six frames in a row and went on to win the nine-hour match 10–9. Facing 2024 Snooker Shoot Out runner-up Liam Graham, amateur player Fergal Quinn won the 18th frame on a respotted black to force a deciding frame, but Graham prevailed to win 10–9. Having changed his cue for the first time in his career (a significant move, given the deeply personal and enduring relationship many snooker players have with their cues), the 1997 winner Ken Doherty recorded a session whitewash against Haydon Pinhey, winning all of the first nine frames. He went on to win the match 10–3. Florian Nüßle recovered from 1–5 behind against Duane Jones to force a deciding frame, but Jones won 10–9. Ahmed Aly Elsayed, Baipat, Mostafa Dorgham, Evans, Andrew Pagett, and Liam Pullen all lost their professional tour cards after their first-round defeats. Evans qualified for a new two-year tour card through her position in the end-of-season women's world rankings, while Pullen secured a new tour card through 2025 Q School.

==== Second qualification round ====
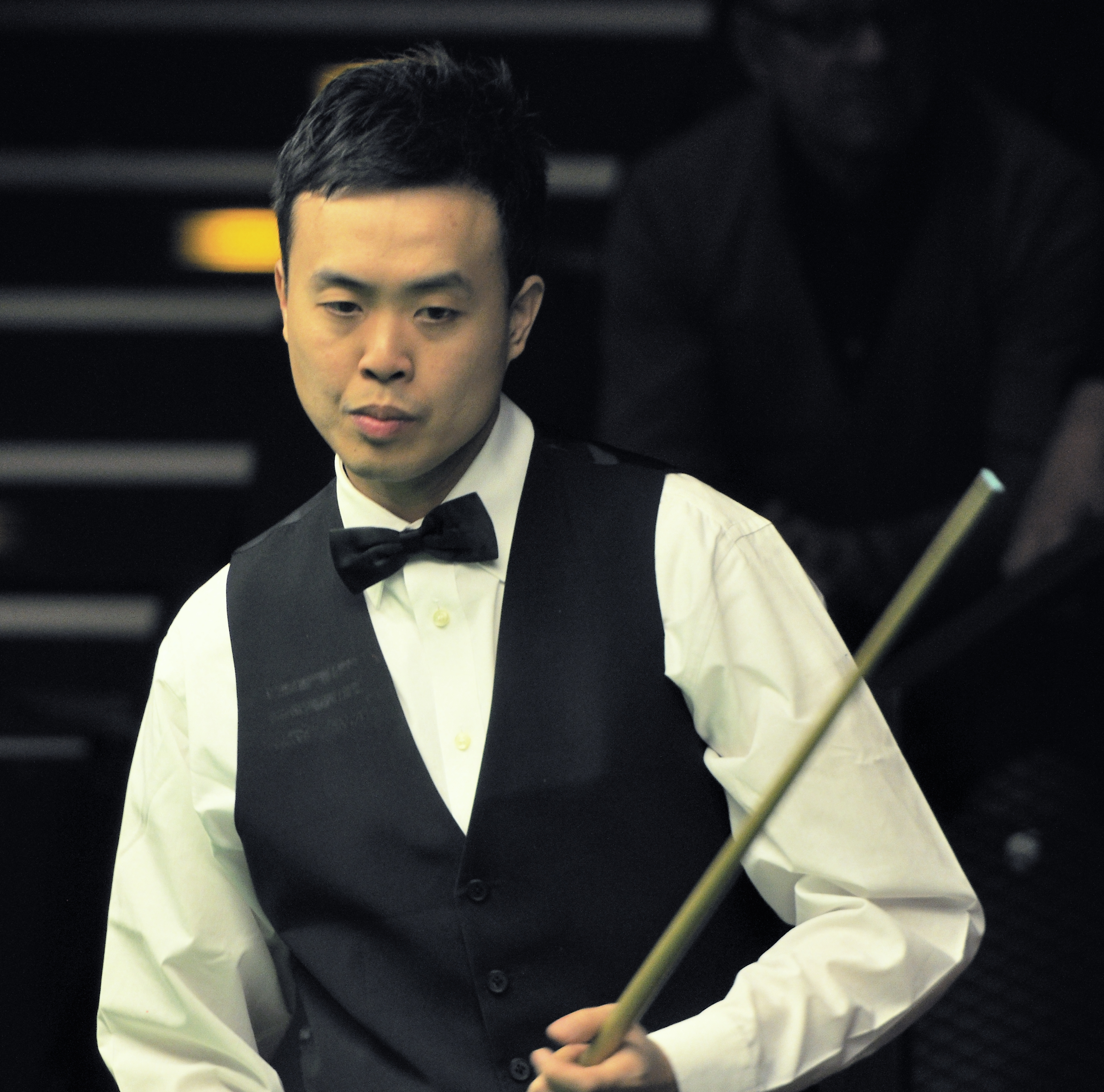
Two-time semi-finalist Marco Fu (pictured in 2014) achieved the seventh 16-red clearance recorded in professional play.

The second qualifying round was played from 9 to 12 April, featuring the winners of the first qualifying round against players ranked 49 to 80. On 9 April, the World Professional Billiards and Snooker Association (WPBSA) announced that it had suspended the world number 56 Graeme Dott, winner of the 2006 event and runner-up in 2004 and 2010. The BBC reported that Dott had been charged with child sex offences. His opponent Wang Yuchen received a walkover to the third qualifying round. In his match against Ben Mertens, two-time semi-finalist Marco Fu received a free ball at the beginning of the fourth frame and made a 16-red clearance. He became the seventh player to achieve the feat in professional competition and the second to do so in a World Championship match, after Steve James at the 1990 event. After replacing his cue tip between sessions, Fu won the match 10–4. Joe Perry, a semi-finalist at the 2008 event, defeated Dylan Emery 10–6 and stated afterwards that the tournament would be his last professional event before his retirement.

Veteran player Anthony Hamilton won the first nine frames against amateur Steven Hallworth, who had recently regained his professional tour card for the following two seasons through the 2024–25 Q Tour Playoff. Hallworth then won eight frames in a row and led by 63 points in the 18th, as he attempted to become the first player to win a best-of-19 match from 0–9 behind. However, Hamilton made a 69 clearance to win 10–8. White lost 5–10 to Ashley Carty, the 19th consecutive year he had lost in the World Championship qualifying rounds. Zhao trailed 4–5 after the first session of his match against Long Zehuang, but he won the first five frames of the second session and secured a 10–8 victory. David Lilley, a former World Seniors Champion, defeated Doherty 10–2. Alfie Burden, Stuart Carrington, Jamie Clarke, David Grace, Andrew Higginson, Ma Hailong, Manasawin Phetmalaikul, Rory Thor, Alexander Ursenbacher, White, and Young all lost their professional tour cards following their second-round defeats. White was subsequently awarded a new two-year invitational tour card for the following two seasons. Grace and Ursenbacher secured new two-year tour cards through Q School.

==== Third qualification round ====
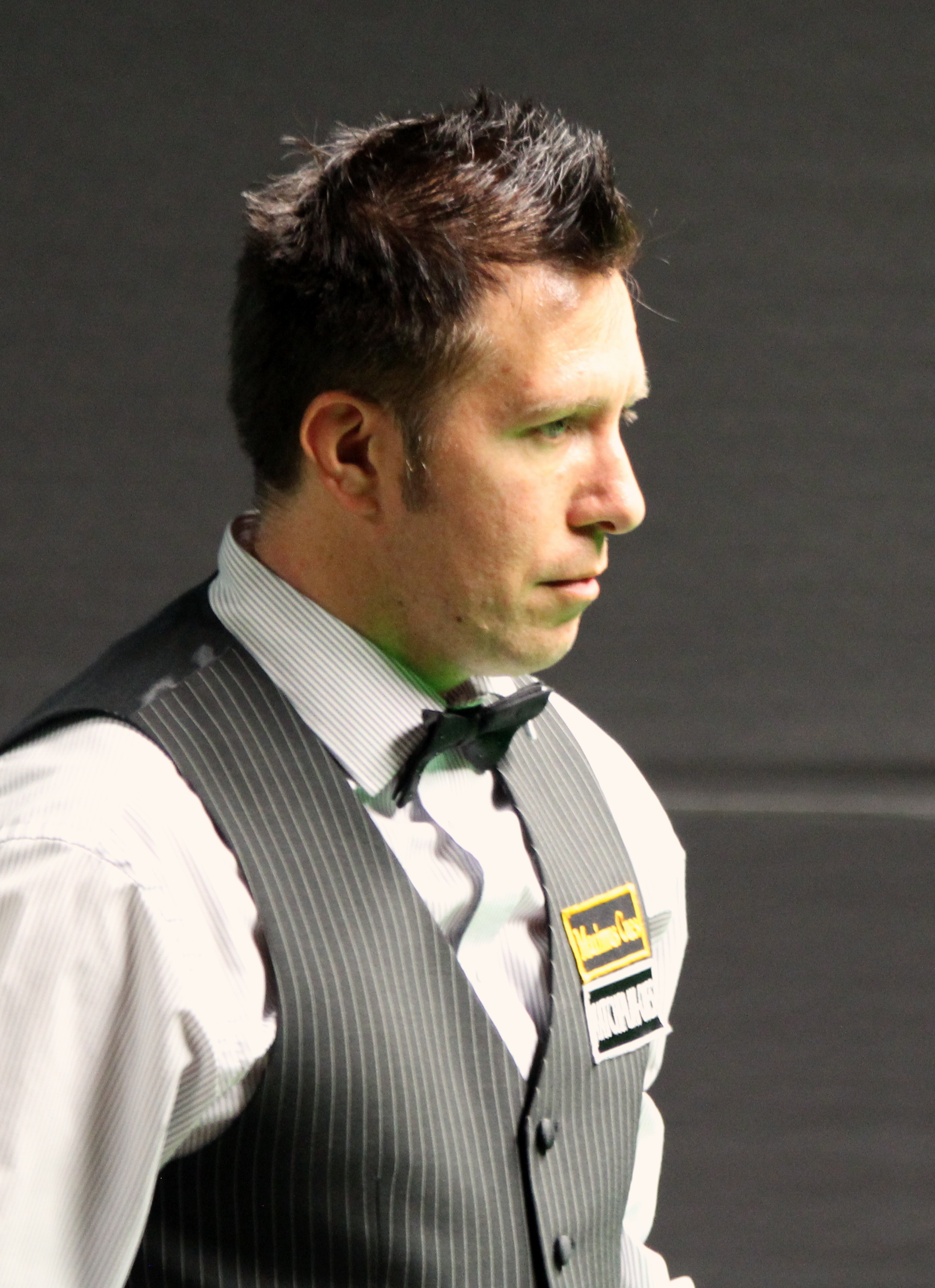
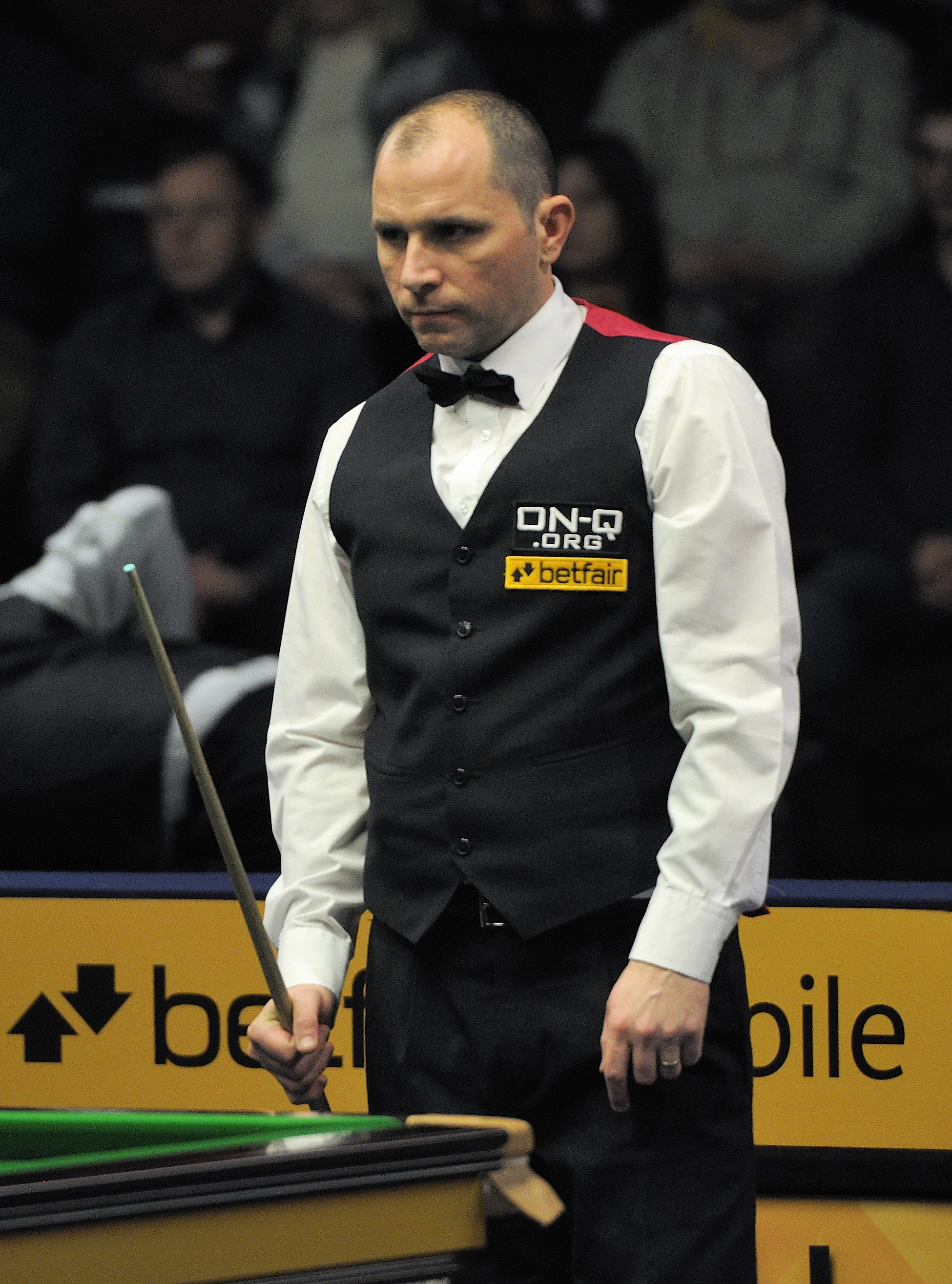
Dominic Dale (left) and Joe Perry (right) both retired from professional competition after losing their third-round qualifying matches.

The third qualifying round was played from 12 to 14 April, featuring the winners of the second qualifying round against players ranked 17 to 48. Dominic Dale and Perry, who had both turned professional in 1992, played the last professional matches of their careers as Dale lost 4–10 to Daniel Wells and Perry lost 5–10 to Yuan Sijun. On his retirement, 53-year-old Dale commented: "I don't have that killer instinct any more—it's the right time to retire." Perry, aged 50, said: "I've taken a long time to come to the decision [to retire]. It isn't a rash one." The world number 73 Zak Surety, who had recently reached his first ranking semi-final at the 2025 World Open, came from 3–6 behind to defeat the world number 25 Jack Lisowski 10–8, making three centuries and six half-centuries in the match. Ricky Walden trailed Mitchell Mann 2–7 after their first session, but he won seven of the first eight frames in the second session to lead 9–8. Mann won the next to force a deciding frame. Walden twice required a snooker in the decider, but he obtained the penalty points he needed and won the match after a duel on the last black ball.

In his 10–2 win over Allan Taylor, Jackson Page became the first player to make two maximum breaks in a professional match. Made in the eighth frame of the match on 13 April and the twelfth frame on 14 April, Page's maximums were the first of his professional career. He won a £147,000 bonus on offer that season for two maximums across the Triple Crown events and the Saudi Arabia Snooker Masters; he also won a £10,000 bonus for making a maximum break in the qualifiers and won two-thirds of the £15,000 highest break prize. "I knew the bonus was up for grabs [for the second 147], so I went for it from the first ball and managed to make it happen," he said afterwards. Page's maximums were respectively the 13th and 14th of the 2024–25 season, surpassing the previous record total of 13 set in each of the 2016–17, 2022–23, and 2023–24 seasons.

The world number 19 Stuart Bingham, winner of the 2015 event and a semi-finalist in 2021 and 2024, lost 6–10 to the world number 79 Michael Holt. Bingham failed to reach the main stage for the first time since the 2010 event. Stephen Maguire, a quarter-finalist the previous year, lost 3–10 to amateur player Gao Yang, who had recently earned a two-year tour card by winning the WSF Championship. The world number 41 Robert Milkins lost 5–10 to the world number 107 Wang. Zhao defeated Lyu Haotian 10–4, making three centuries and five half-centuries, while Elliot Slessor defeated Fu 10–6. The world number 20 Chris Wakelin, the 2024 International Championship runner-up, won five consecutive frames for a 10–5 victory over Xing Zihao. Ben Woollaston defeated Mark Davis on the last black ball of a 58-minute deciding frame. The world number 95 Sunny Akani beat the world number 29 Noppon Saengkham 10–7, and the world number 76 Ross Muir defeated the world number 21 Tom Ford by the same score. The world number 18 Ali Carter, a two-time finalist, recovered from 6–7 behind to beat Burns 10–8, while Matthew Stevens, also a two-time finalist, defeated Thepchaiya Un-Nooh by the same score. Burns, Carty, Fu, Hamilton, Hammad Miah, and Xing all lost their professional tour cards after their third-round defeats. Fu was subsequently awarded a new two-year invitational tour card for the following two seasons. Burns secured a new two-year tour card through Q School. Following an unsuccessful attempt to regain his tour place through Q School, 53-year-old Hamilton announced his retirement in June 2025, after 34 years on the professional tour.

==== Fourth qualification round ====
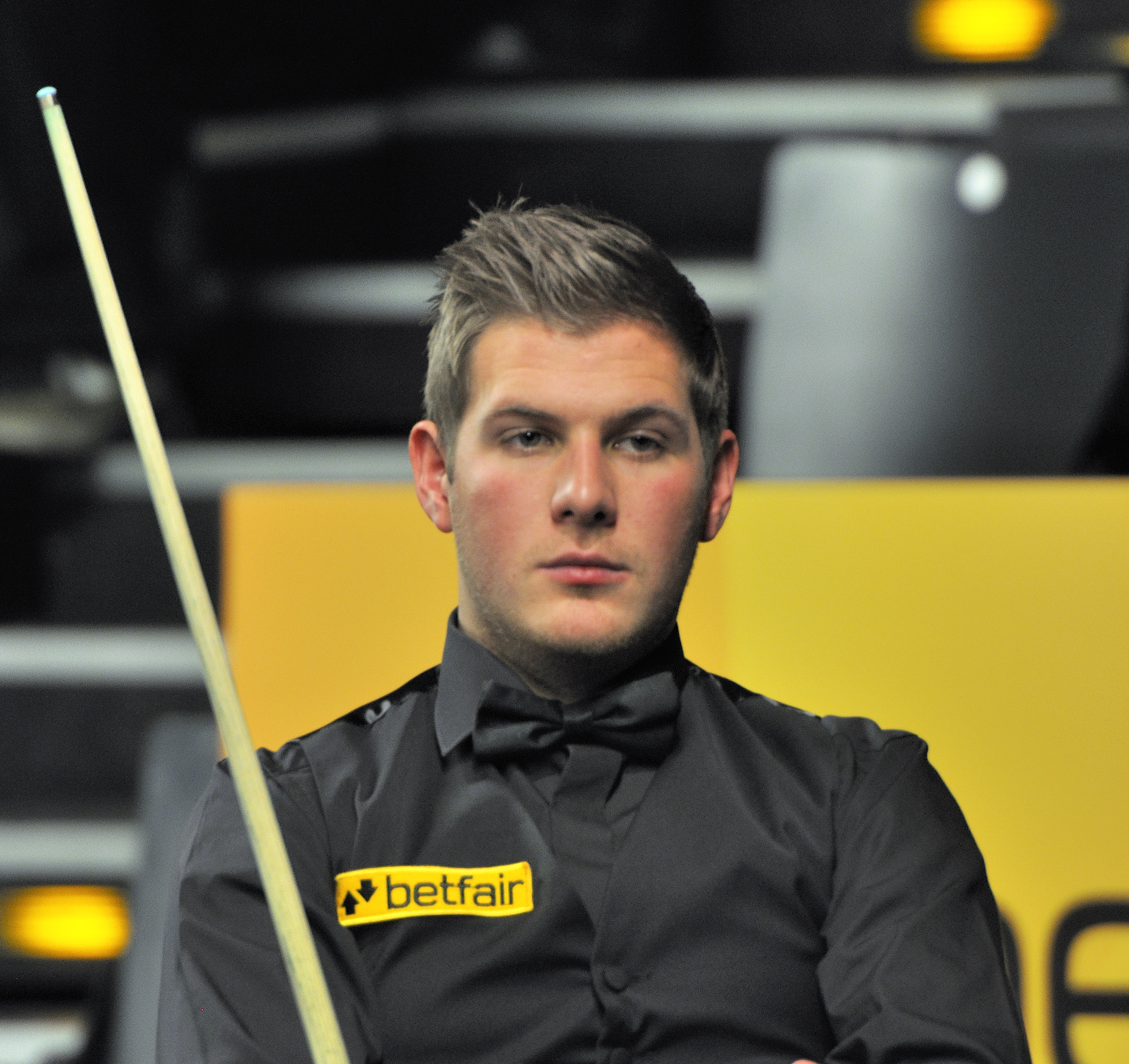
Daniel Wells (pictured in 2013) qualified for the tournament's main stage for the first time. The two other Crucible debutants were fellow qualifiers Lei Peifan and Zak Surety.

The fourth qualifying round, billed as "Judgement Day", was played on 15 and 16 April, featuring the winners of the third qualifying round. On 15 April, Zhao defeated Slessor 10–8 in a match that produced six centuries, 134, 127, and 103 by Zhao and 114, 113, and 126 by Slessor. Zhao made a total of 12 centuries and 23 half-centuries in the qualifying rounds overall. Surety defeated Walden 10–3 to reach the main stage for the first time. Wells led world number 17 Gary Wilson 6–2, but Wilson tied the scores at 6–6 and the match went to a deciding frame. Having lost a deciding frame to Barry Hawkins in the final qualifying round of the 2009 event, Wells prevailed to beat Wilson 10–9 and secure his Crucible debut. Aaron Hill led Gilbert 6–3 after the first session and went on to lead 8–5 and 9–7. However, Gilbert won the next two frames and made a 63 break to lead in the decider. Requiring a snooker on the last red, Hill obtained the penalty points he needed, but Gilbert won the match after potting the green. Woollaston defeated Muir 10–4 to reach the main stage for the first time since the 2013 event. Wakelin defeated Martin O'Donnell 10–2. Zhou Yuelong, who had lost in the final qualifying round in each of the previous three years, came from 1–4 behind to defeat Yuan 10–5. In the fifth frame of his match with Ryan Day, Akani successfully obtained three snookers to force a respotted black, but Day potted the black to win the frame. Day went on to win the match 10–5.

The world number 30 Joe O'Connor, recently a finalist at the 2025 World Open, defeated Page 10–7. Stevens led the world number 22 Wu Yize 4–0, but Wu reduced Stevens's lead to 5–4 after the first session. Wu won four consecutive frames in the second session to take a 9–7 lead, but Stevens won the next two to force a deciding frame. Wu, who made four centuries of 127, 139, 103, and 122 in the match, prevailed to win the decider on the colours. Carter, who said he had considered withdrawing in the previous round due to a neck injury, defeated He Guoqiang 10–5. Fan Zhengyi beat Holt 10–4, and Pang Junxu defeated Jamie Jones 10–6. The world number 24 Hossein Vafaei made five centuries of 113, 123, 104, 135, and 111 as he beat Wang 10–4. Jimmy Robertson led Selt 8–3, but Selt recovered to tie the scores at 9–9. The 49-minute deciding frame concluded when Robertson missed match ball, the last pink, allowing Selt to pot pink and black for victory. Gao led the 2024 Scottish Open winner Lei Peifan 5–4 after their first session. Their match also went to a deciding frame, which Lei won to secure his Crucible debut. A then-record ten players from China—qualifiers Fan, Lei, Pang, Wu, Zhao, and Zhou and seeds Ding Junhui, Si Jiahui, Xiao Guodong, and Zhang Anda—reached the Crucible. The previous highest number had been six at the 2019 event.

=== Main stage ===
==== First round ====
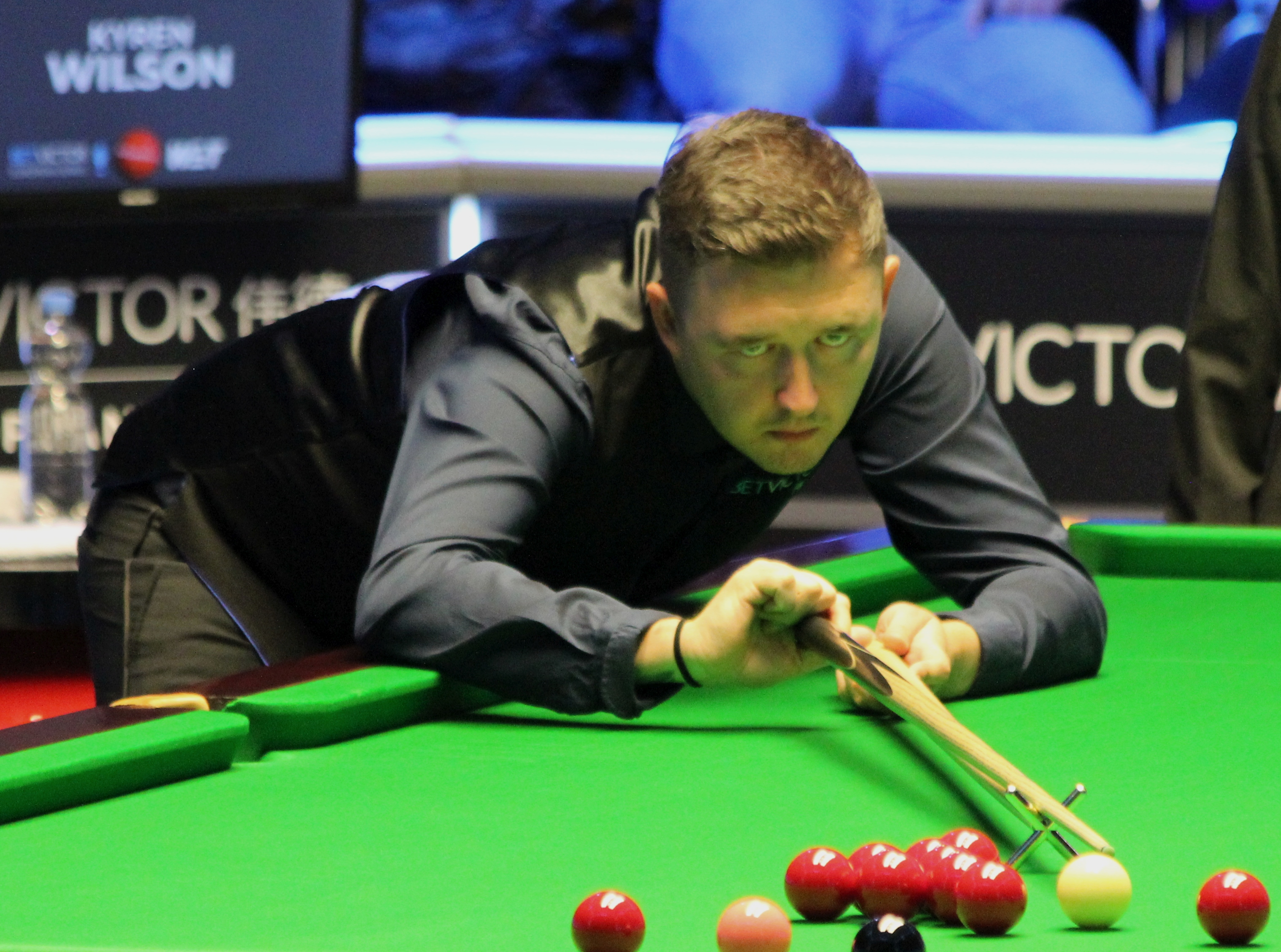
The defending champion Kyren Wilson (pictured in 2022) became the 20th player to experience the so-called Crucible curse, losing 9–10 to debutant Lei Peifan.

The first round took place from 19 to 24 April, each match played as the best of 19 frames over two sessions. There were three debutants at the Crucible: Daniel Wells, Lei Peifan, and Zak Surety. The defending champion Kyren Wilson, who had won four ranking titles that season, faced 21-year-old Lei. Wilson lost the first two frames but then won six in a row. Lei took the last of the session to leave Wilson with a 6–3 lead. Lei won the first six frames of the second session, outscoring Wilson cumulatively by 544 points to 44, as he moved into a 9–6 lead. Wilson won the next three to force a deciding frame, but Lei won the decider with a 66 break. Wilson became the 20th player to experience the so-called Crucible curse, referring to the fact that no first-time champion had retained the title since the tournament moved to the Crucible in 1977. Lei said afterwards: "I was definitely feeling pressure towards the end. I calmed myself down and told myself not to over-think—just to let go and play freely." Wilson called his defeat "hard to take" but praised his opponent, saying "Lei potted some incredible balls and held himself together in the end." The 14th seed Xiao Guodong, who had won his maiden ranking title that season at the 2024 Wuhan Open, made his first Crucible appearance since the 2018 event. He led qualifier Matthew Selt 7–2 after the first session and went on to win 10–4. Xiao said afterwards that he was "very proud" of the record number of Chinese players at the event.

The three-time champion and sixth seed Mark Williams, making his 27th Crucible appearance, won the opening three frames against qualifier Wu Yize. Wu then scored 466 points without reply, the second-highest total in Crucible history—surpassed only by the 485 unanswered points by John Higgins at the 2000 event—and won four consecutive frames. Williams regained the lead at 5–4. Wu moved 8–7 ahead in the second session, but Williams won the last three frames for a 10–8 victory. Speaking afterwards about his deteriorating eyesight, Williams said he intended to undergo lens replacement surgery in June, which he hoped would extend his playing career by several years. Williams subsequently said he had reconsidered the surgery after talking with other professionals who had undergone the procedure, notably Anthony Hamilton. Facing the 2010 winner and ninth seed Neil Robertson, qualifier Chris Wakelin led 7–2 after the opening session. Robertson tied the scores at 7–7 and 8–8, but Wakelin secured a 10–8 win, his first Crucible victory after three previous first-round defeats. "I was ready for him to come back at me and I managed to get over the line in the end," said Wakelin afterwards. The 2013 runner-up and 11th seed Barry Hawkins led qualifier Hossein Vafaei 5–4 after their first session. Vafaei, appearing at the Crucible for a fourth time, made three century breaks in the second session as he took the match to a deciding frame, which he won with a 73 break. Having shouted out after potting a red during the decider, Vafaei said afterwards that: "I had to show some emotion or I'm not human. I had to show to the fans that we feel the pressure. People want to see this."

The previous year's runner-up and 16th seed Jak Jones faced qualifier Zhao Xintong, who became the third player to compete at the main stage of the World Championship as an amateur, following James Cahill at the 2019 event and Michael White at the 2022 event. Zhao made a total clearance of 142 and nine half-centuries as he won the match 10–4. Zhao said afterwards that the qualifiers had been "tough and intense" and allowed him to "build up momentum" for the main stage. The eighth seed Mark Allen was making his 19th Crucible appearance and still seeking his first world title to complete his career Triple Crown. Allen said he would take inspiration from golfer Rory McIlroy, who had recently won the 2025 Masters Tournament on his 16th attempt, completing his career Grand Slam. Playing qualifier Fan Zhengyi, whom he had previously defeated 10–5 in the first round of the 2023 event, Allen led 5–4 after the first session and went on to secure a 10–6 victory. Allen commented afterwards that he had been working on his mental and physical health in preparation for the tournament. Making his 31st Crucible appearance, four-time winner and third seed Higgins came to the tournament in an emotional state after his father-in-law had suffered a heart attack the previous week. He faced qualifier Joe O'Connor, whom he had recently beaten in the 2025 World Open final. O'Connor attempted a maximum break in frame seven, but he missed the 13th red while bridging over the blue with the spider. Higgins trailed 4–5 after the opening session but recovered to win the match 10–7. Saying that he had been "in tears" before the match, he stated: "That was the most emotional I have ever been today." He added that while he had been "drained" in the first session, he had played better in the second session after getting some sleep. BBC presenter Seema Jaswal hugged Higgins live on air during his tearful post-match interview.

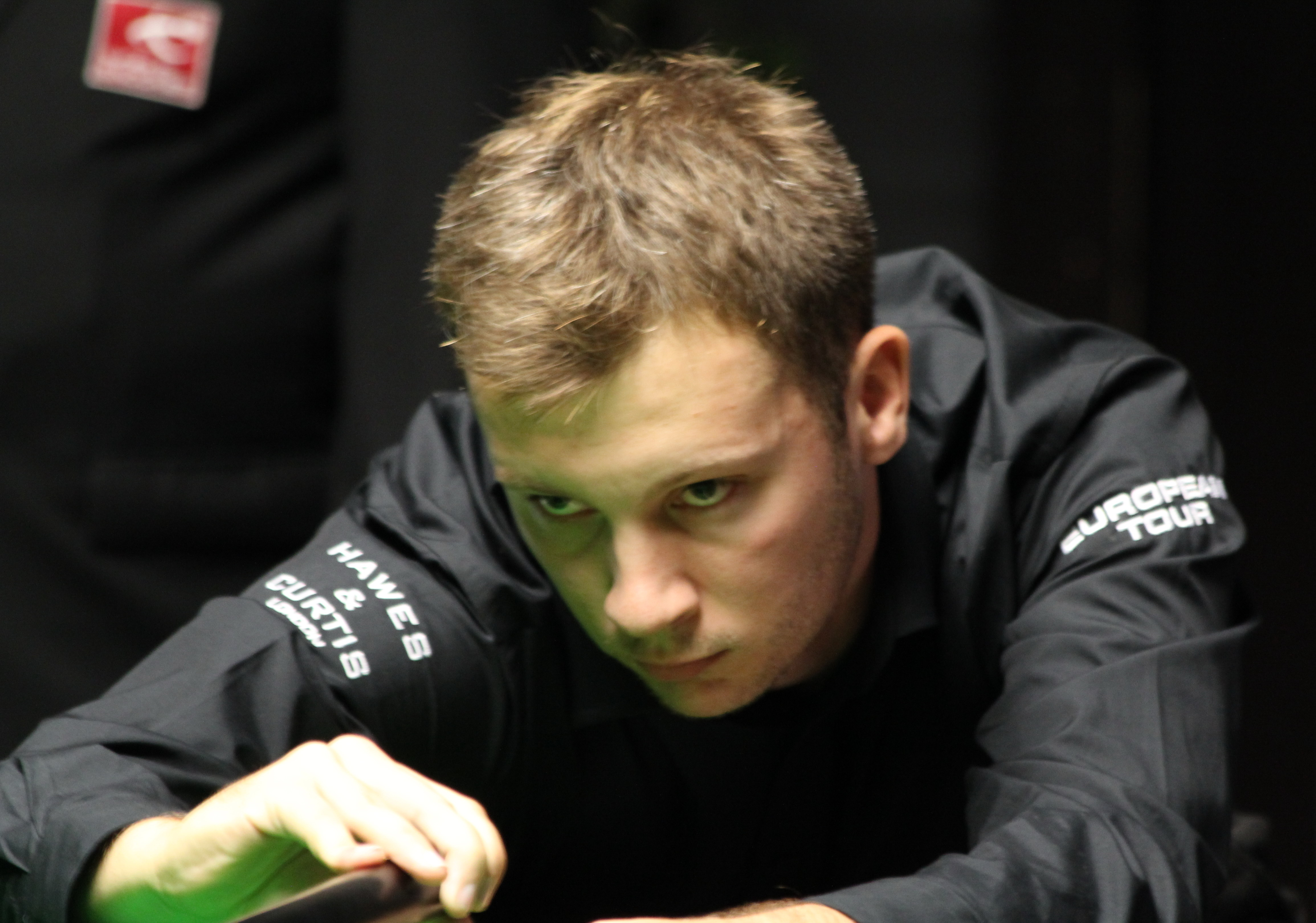
Zak Surety (pictured in 2014) made four century breaks in his debut match at the Crucible, setting a new record.

The 2016 runner-up and 10th seed Ding Junhui, whose last four Crucible appearances had ended in first-round defeats, faced debutant and world number 73 Surety. Ding won the first four frames, but Surety won three of the next five, making a 104 century, to leave Ding 6–3 ahead after the first session. In the second session, Surety won three of the first four frames with century breaks of 109, 136, and 110 as he narrowed Ding's lead to one at 7–6, but Ding went on to win the match 10–7. Surety's four centuries set a new record for a player in his debut match at the Crucible, breaking the previous record of three achieved by Ryan Day at the 2004 event and Jackson Page at the 2022 event. "There was big pressure when Zak [Surety] made the centuries; he was winning the frame every time he got a chance," said Ding afterwards. The 2023 semi-finalist and 13th seed Si Jiahui faced qualifier and 2024 semi-finalist David Gilbert. Si led 6–3 after the opening session and won three of the first four frames in the second session to lead 9–4. Gilbert made back-to-back centuries of 104 and 102, but Si secured a 10–6 victory. "The crowd here is always amazing," said Si afterwards. "They're so enthusiastic and generous with their applause. It really lifts your spirits."

The seven-time champion and fifth seed Ronnie O'Sullivan made a record-extending 33rd Crucible appearance at the event. He had not participated in a ranking event since the 2024 UK Championship the previous November and had not competed professionally since snapping his cue at the 2025 Championship League in January after losing four of his first five matches. Facing qualifier Ali Carter, O'Sullivan led 5–4 after the first session and made breaks of 59, 117, 74, 123, and 131 in the second session as he won five consecutive frames for a 10–4 victory. On his return to competition, he said: "Just to be out there and play one good session was a nice feeling. I feel like I've had a victory just winning a match." The 15th seed Shaun Murphy, winner of the 2025 Masters, defeated debutant Wells 10–4. Each frame of the match produced a break of 50 or over, including three centuries by each player, which equalled the record of six centuries in a first-round match at the Crucible. "My game is the best it has ever been and I'm sharp, I'm ready," Murphy said afterwards. The 12th seed Zhang Anda led qualifier Pang Junxu 5–3 and 7–5, but Pang took five consecutive frames to win 10–7 and secure his first Crucible victory. Zhang, who had never reached the last 16 of the event, lost in the first round for a fifth time. "[Zhang's] safety play was excellent... I had to wait for his mistakes and slowly find my rhythm," Pang said afterwards.

The 2019 winner and world number one Judd Trump, who had won ranking titles that season at the UK Championship and the 2024 Saudi Arabia Snooker Masters, faced qualifier Zhou Yuelong. Trump won five of the first six frames, including a century of 117, and led 6–3 after the opening session. In the second session, Trump made four centuries in five frames—113, 114, 114, and 100—to win the match 10–4. "I felt a bit edgy at the start but then settled down and felt confident," he said afterwards. The 2023 winner and seventh seed Luca Brecel came to the Crucible needing to win the title to remain in the top 16. He lost five of the first six frames against qualifier Ryan Day but recovered to secure a 10–7 victory. Day lost the 16th frame when he went in-off after attempting a double on the last black. "From 3–5 down I felt I couldn't lose... I felt so relaxed and I could see [Day] was nervous," Brecel said afterwards. The four-time winner and fourth seed Mark Selby faced qualifier Ben Woollaston, the world number 44. Woollaston won three of the first four frames, but Selby recovered to lead 5–4 after the first session. In the second session, Woollaston won six of the nine frames played for a 10–8 victory; he reached the second round for the first time, while Selby lost in the first round for a second consecutive year. "I stayed tough in the safety battles and that won me the match," Woollaston said afterwards. Having made only one break over 40 in the second session, Selby was scathing about his own performance, calling it "pathetic from start to finish".

A total of six seeded players exited the tournament in the first round: Hawkins, Jak Jones, Neil Robertson, Selby, Kyren Wilson, and Zhang. The exits of Wilson and Jones meant that both of the previous year's finalists had been eliminated in the first round. The first round produced a total of 55 century breaks, breaking the previous record of 44 set in the 2022 event.

==== Second round ====
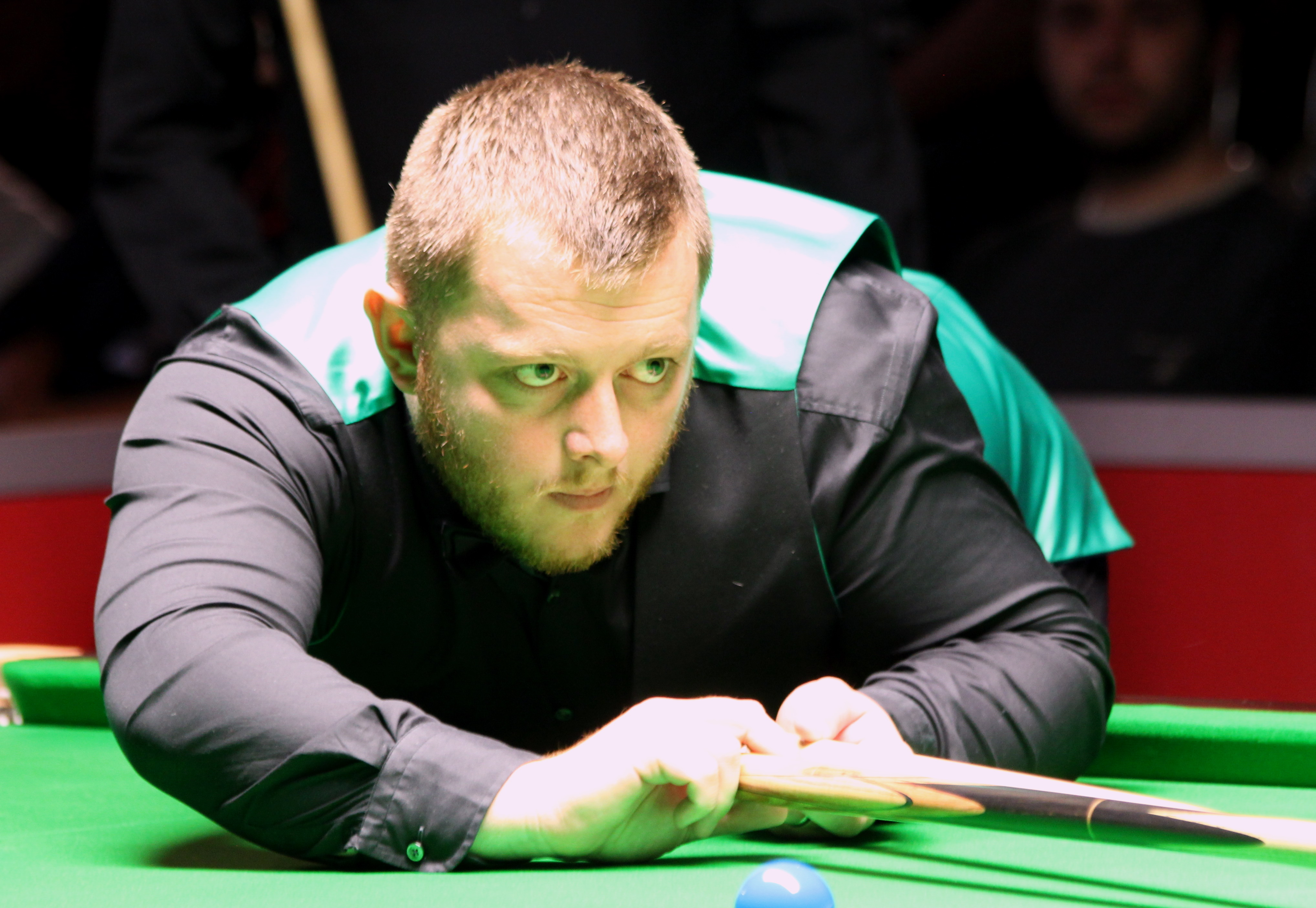
Mark Allen (pictured in 2016) made the 15th maximum break in Crucible history. He became the first player to make maximum breaks at all three Triple Crown events.

The second round took place from 24 to 28 April, each match played as the best of 25 frames over three sessions. Ten of the sixteen seeds reached the second round, along with six qualifiers. A record six Chinese players reached the last 16 of the tournament. Facing Allen, Wakelin won the last three frames of the first session to lead 6–2; he also won the first four frames of the second session as he moved 10–2 ahead. Allen visited the practice table at the mid-session interval, not having potted a ball in the preceding three frames. When play resumed, he made a maximum break in the 13th frame, the 15th in Crucible history and the fifth of his professional career. He became the 11th player to make a maximum at the Crucible and the first to make maximum breaks at all three Triple Crown events, following his 147 breaks at the 2016 UK Championship and the 2024 Masters. It was the record-extending 15th maximum break of the 2024‍–‍25 season. Allen said later: "Things were going badly. I was 10–2 down. I decided very early in the break I was going to go for it because I needed something to gee myself up and get the crowd on my side." Wakelin won the 14th frame, but Allen took the 15th with a century to avoid losing the match with a session to spare. Wakelin took the last of the session to move one from victory at 12–4. Allen won a £40,000 bonus for making a maximum at the Crucible, plus one-third of the £15,000 highest break prize. During the final session, he attempted another maximum break in the 18th frame—which would have earned him a £147,000 bonus—but he missed the 11th black. Wakelin went on to secure a 13–6 win. "I feel I have really matured as a player and the sky's the limit," Wakelin said afterwards.

The first session between Higgins and Xiao ended level at 4–4. In frame 14, while leading 7–6, Higgins required two snookers on the blue to tie. He obtained the penalty points he needed but lost the frame after going in-off the respotted black. The second session ended level at 8–8. In the third session, Xiao won the 63-minute 20th frame after Higgins made a safety error on the last brown, tying the scores at 10–10. Higgins won the next two—the 21st being the 2,000th frame he had played at the Crucible, making him only the second player, after O'Sullivan, to reach that milestone—as he moved one from victory at 12–10. He had a match-winning opportunity in the 23rd but missed a black off its spot with two reds remaining; Xiao cleared to win the frame. After the first seven frames of the third session lasted four hours, the match was taken off due to time constraints; it resumed that evening, with Higgins leading 12–11. In the 24th frame, Higgins missed a match ball pink. He then fouled the pink, and Xiao made a 39 clearance to win the frame on the last black, tying the scores at 12–12. Higgins made breaks of 44 and 75 to win the deciding frame, the ninth decider he had won at the Crucible out of ten played. After the 10-hour match, Higgins called Xiao "such a tough player" and said: "We were matching each other punch for punch. There was good stuff and long frames with good safety. I thoroughly enjoyed the game." The first session between Williams and Vafaei ended level at 4–4. Williams twice moved three frames ahead at 7–4 and 9–6, but Vafaei finished the second session with a 132 century to leave Williams leading 9–7. In the final session, Williams again took a three-frame lead at 11–8. Vafaei came within one frame at 11–10, but Williams won the match 13–10, finishing with a 115 century. Williams said afterwards: "The last few times I have come here, I am just trying to enjoy the moments because I don't know how many times I will be back. I don't know how I am still playing to a fairly decent level."

O'Sullivan won the first four frames against Pang and led 6–2 after the first session. Pang won the first two frames of the second session, but O'Sullivan won six in a row, making breaks of 79, 80, 105, 135, and 62 as he moved 12–4 ahead. O'Sullivan took the first and only frame of the third session to win 13–4. O'Sullivan was critical of his performance afterwards, rating it as a two out of ten and saying he would "have to start playing a lot better" to have a chance of winning the tournament. Brecel, who had travelled to his native Belgium after his first-round match, returned to Sheffield by private jet to face Ding, arriving at the Crucible just 25 minutes before the match started. Ding made a 141 break in the opening frame but scored only 15 points over the remainder of the session as Brecel made breaks of 121, 78, 55, 100, 88, and 89 to win seven consecutive frames, taking a 7–1 lead. Steve Davis, commentating for the BBC, described the session as the best he had ever seen at the Crucible; the players received a standing ovation as they left the arena. Brecel won the first four frames of the second session to lead 11–1, but Ding took three of the last four, finishing with back-to-back centuries of 107 and 110, to avoid losing the match with a session to spare. The third session lasted one frame as Brecel completed a 13–4 victory. He said afterwards: "I will have to keep up my level of play [in the quarter-finals]. My focus needs to be strong and my cue ball control needs to be good." Lei, the last remaining debutant, faced Zhao, who led 5–3 after the first session and 10–6 after the second session. In frame 17, Zhao attempted a maximum break but missed the 10th red. Zhao led 11–6 and 12–7, but Lei then won three consecutive frames before Zhao secured a 13–10 win. Saying afterwards that he was "so proud", Zhao commented that playing at the Crucible "doesn't just test your overall game level, but also your mental toughness".

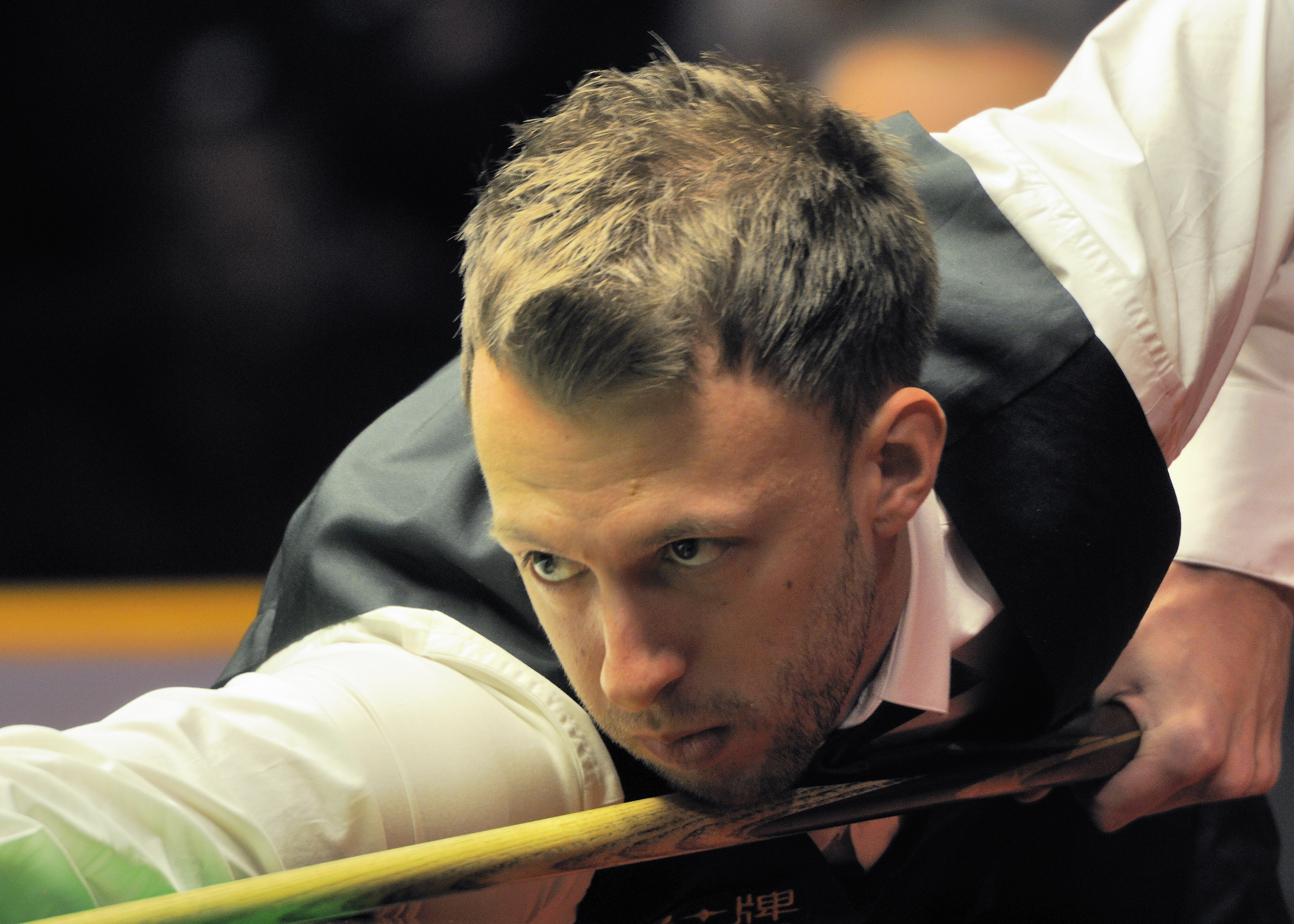
Judd Trump (pictured in 2014) made his 100th century break of the 2024–25 season, winning a £100,000 bonus. He went on to set a new record for the most centuries in one season, making 107.

Trump lost the first two frames against Murphy but recovered to lead 5–3 after the first session. Murphy began the second session by winning the 43-minute ninth frame; the next four frames were shared, as Trump made breaks of 89 and 97 in the 10th and 12th, and Murphy countered with breaks of 87 and 67 in the 11th and 13th. Trump then made back-to-back century breaks of 106 and 132; the latter was his 100th century of the 2024–25 season, winning him a £100,000 bonus. It was the second time he had reached 100 centuries in a season, having previously made 102 centuries in the 2019–20 season. Trump took the last of the session with a 92 break to lead 10–6. He won the first two frames of the final session with half-century breaks to lead 12–6, but Murphy won four consecutive frames with breaks of 88, 72, 112, and 99, reducing Trump's lead to 12–10. Trump made a 58 break to secure a 13–10 victory. Trump said afterwards that he had been "a little bit worried" by Murphy's comeback, but added: "I'm a lot more confident this year, I'm hitting the ball a lot better. I probably have a bit more belief in myself and I feel a lot more calm." Facing Woollaston, Si led 4–3 after the first seven frames. In the eighth, with just pink and black remaining, Woollaston required two snookers. He obtained the penalty points he needed, but Si laid a snooker of his own and potted the pink after Woollaston's escape, taking a 5–3 lead. In the second session, Woollaston made breaks of 85 and 100 as he narrowed Si's lead to one frame at 8–7, but Si won the 16th frame on the last black to lead 9–7. In the final session, Woollaston tied the scores at 9–9, making a 110 break in the 18th frame, and drew level again at 10–10. Si won three consecutive frames, making a 126 break in frame 22, as he secured a 13–10 victory. Si said afterwards: "It was exhausting—mainly mentally exhausting. In the end, I relied entirely on my willpower to win."

==== Quarter-finals ====
The quarter-finals took place on 29 and 30 April, each match played as the best of 25 frames over three sessions. For the fifth time, all three members of the Class of '92—O'Sullivan, Higgins, and Williams—reached the quarter-finals; they had all previously done so at the 1998, 1999, 2011, and 2022 events. O'Sullivan made a record-extending 23rd quarter-final appearance. Wakelin and Zhao both competed in the quarter-finals for the first time, with Zhao becoming the first amateur player in the tournament's history to reach the last eight.

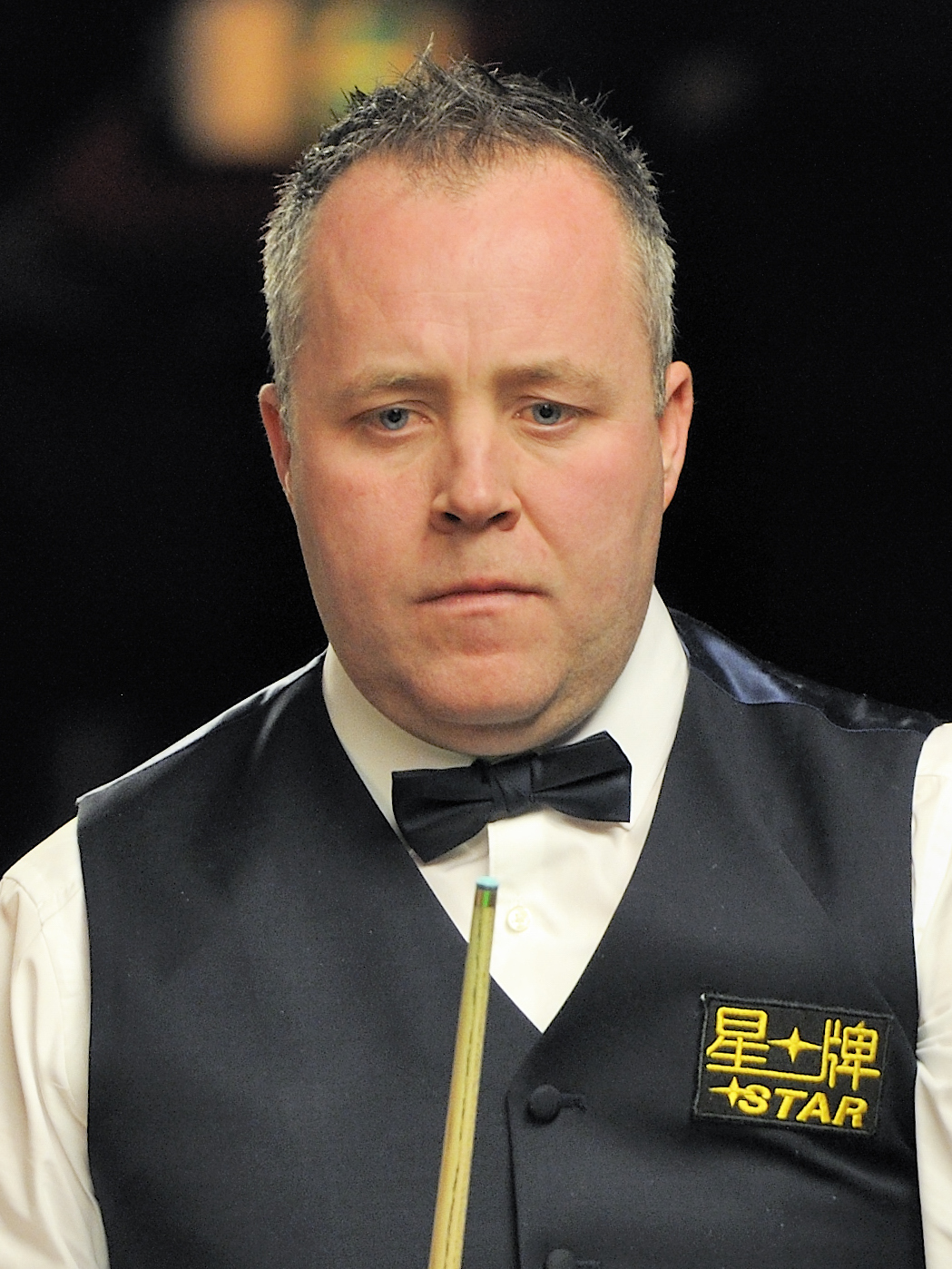
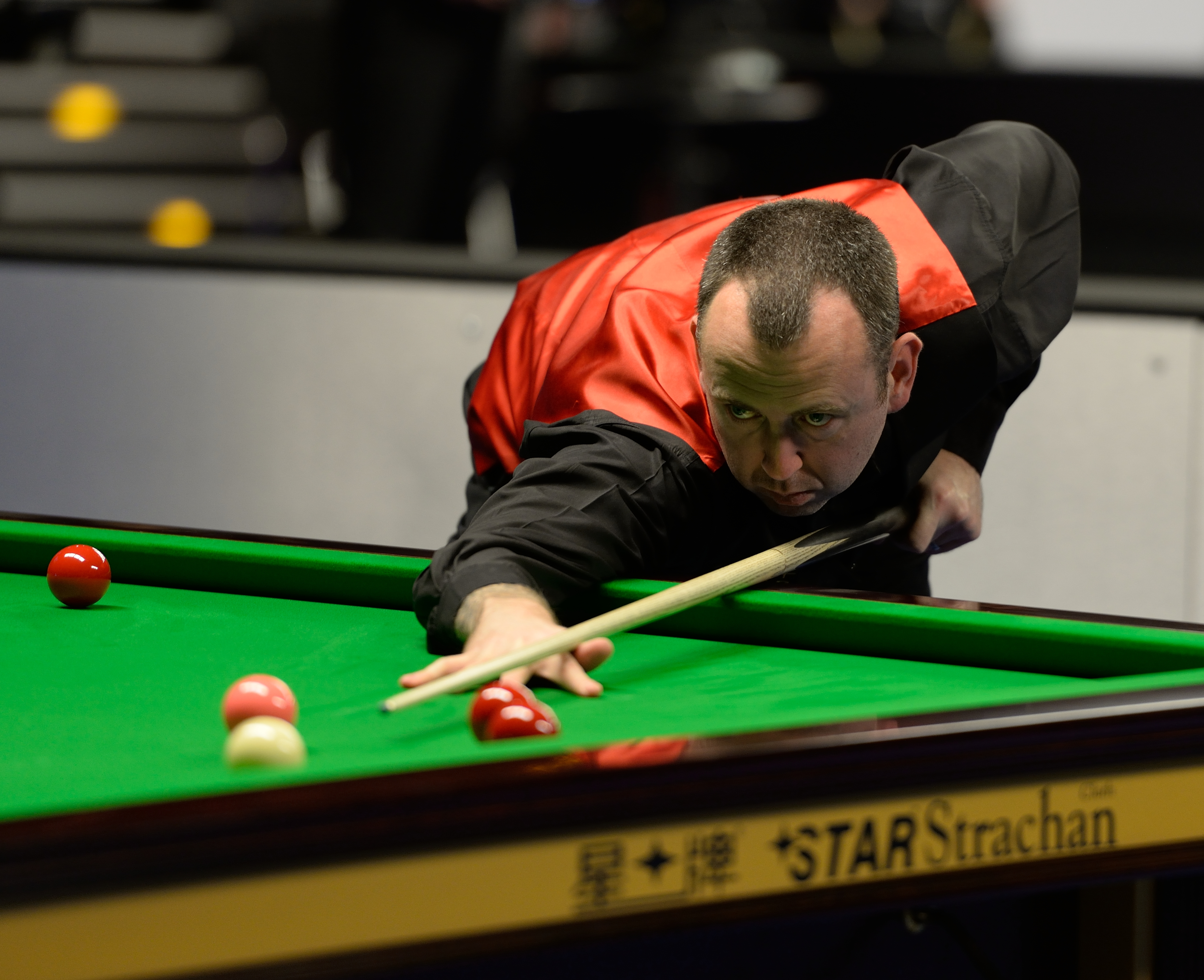
John Higgins (left) and Mark Williams (right) met in the quarter-finals. Williams won the deciding frame on the colours after Higgins missed a match-ball blue.

Williams and Higgins received a standing ovation as they entered the Crucible arena. Williams had won four of their last five World Championship meetings, including the final of the 2018 event, but Higgins made the stronger start to the match, winning five of the first six frames for a 5–1 lead. Williams took the last two frames of the first session, reducing Higgins's lead to 5–3. Williams won five of the eight frames played in the second session, tying the scores at 8–8. He also took the first four frames of the final session—by which point he had won 11 of the last 14 frames in the match—to move 12–8 in front, needing one frame for victory. However, Higgins made breaks of 94, 114, and 67 as he won four consecutive frames, tying the scores at 12–12. The deciding frame came down to the colours. Leading by 13 points, Higgins missed match ball, the last blue, and Williams potted the blue, pink, and black to secure a 13–12 victory. It was the first deciding frame Higgins had lost at the Crucible since the 1996 event. "Unbelievable game, unbelievable finish," Williams said afterwards, calling his pot on the last blue "one of [his] best shots for many years." Higgins commented that he was "devastated" to lose, but said that "the atmosphere we got in there is why we keep playing the game."

In his opening session against Si, O'Sullivan made four half-centuries and a century of 121 to lead 6–2. The first four frames of the second session were shared. Si was 43 points ahead in the 13th with 43 remaining, but O'Sullivan snookered him on the final red and won the frame, moving 9–4 in front. Si won the next two, but O'Sullivan took the last frame of the session to lead 10–6. Si won three of the first four frames in the final session as he reduced O'Sullivan's lead to two frames at 11–9, but O'Sullivan won the next two to secure a 13–9 victory. Afterwards, O'Sullivan expressed frustration with his new cue and his standard of play, saying he had "played the worst snooker" at the tournament. Claiming that Si had played poorly and "let [him] off the hook", he said: "I have relied on other people to win and that doesn't feel good for me. I always feel better when I force the opening and put the pressure on my opponents." Facing Wakelin, Zhao won six consecutive frames in each of the first two sessions, moving 12–4 ahead. He went on to secure a 13–5 victory. "There were quite a few mistakes, and we both gave each other a lot of chances," Zhao said afterwards. He commented that playing four qualifying matches and three matches at the Crucible had left him mentally fatigued, but said: "Now I've come this far, I do think there's a chance I can go even further."

Trump and Brecel shared the first two frames, but Trump won the third on the last black and went on to accumulate 347 points without reply—including breaks of 106, 110, and 87—as he moved into a 5–1 lead. Brecel won the last two frames of the session with breaks of 68 and 128 as he reduced Trump's lead to 5–3. Brecel won the first four frames of the second session with breaks of 73, 114, 59, and 51, taking a 7–5 lead. After losing six consecutive frames—during which he had been outscored cumulatively by 592 points to 81—Trump won the next two to tie the scores at 7–7. Brecel regained the lead with a 92 break, but Trump won a tactical last frame of the session to level at 8–8. In the final session, Trump took five consecutive frames to win the match 13–8. He made back-to-back centuries of 115 and 116 during the session; the latter was his 104th century of the season, breaking the previous record of 103 set by Neil Robertson in the 2013–14 season. "Luca [Brecel] was unstoppable for a period of six frames," Trump said afterwards, adding: "I had to really dig in and get out of the second session at 8–8, that's where I won the match. I didn't get frustrated, I kept my head and waited to turn things around." Brecel, who dropped from seventh to 38th in the world rankings after the tournament, said afterwards: "[Trump is] so difficult to play against. Anyone in the draw I would have fancied beating, but he's just a different level."

==== Semi-finals ====
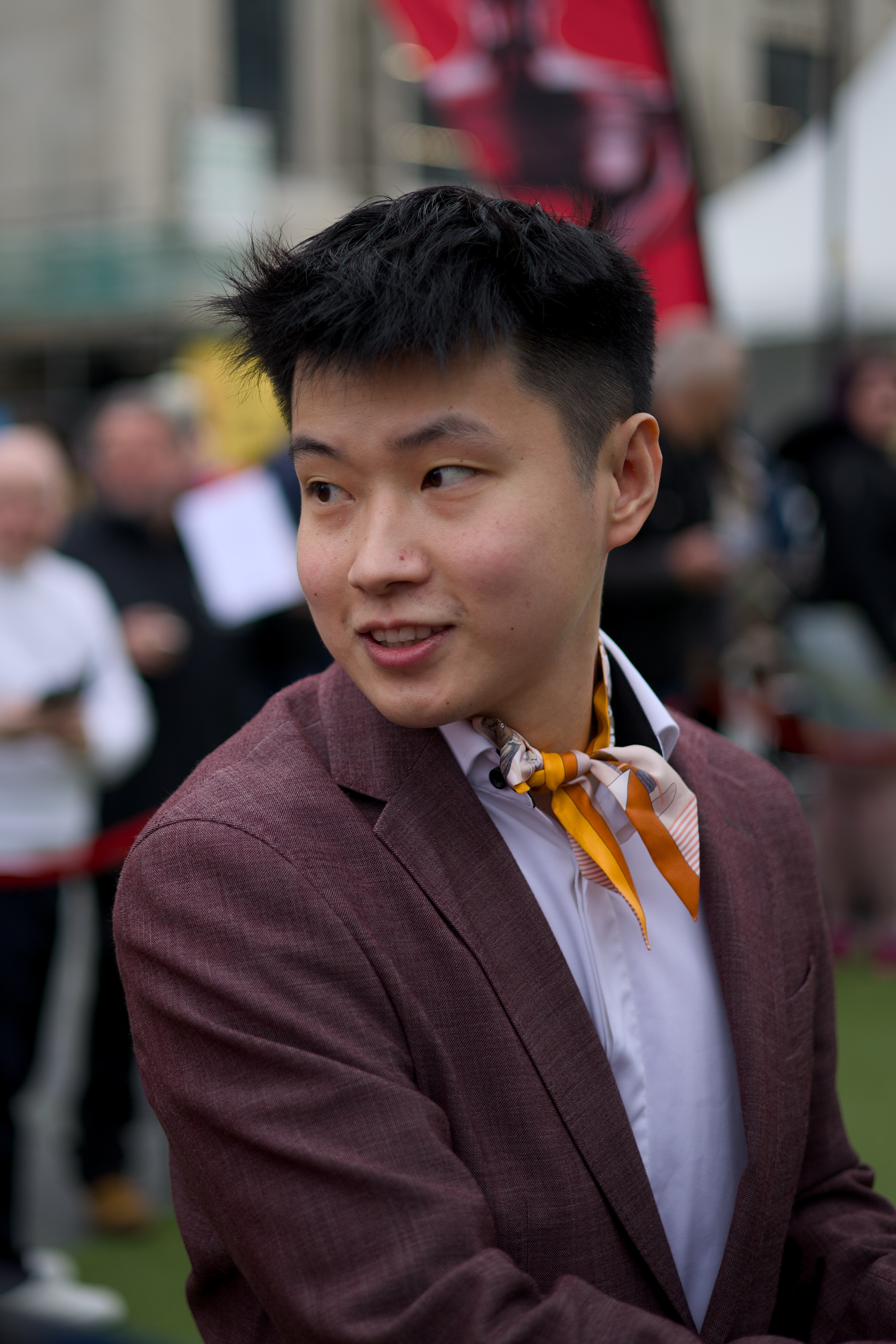
Zhao Xintong (pictured in 2026) defeated seven-time champion Ronnie O'Sullivan with a session to spare. He went on to beat Mark Williams in the final, becoming the first World Champion from Asia.

The semi-finals took place from 1 to 3 May, played as the best of 33 frames over four sessions. Zhao faced O'Sullivan, who played in a record-extending 14th semi-final, having won his previous six semi-final matches. The scores were tied at 4–4 after the first session, during which Zhao made four half-centuries and O'Sullivan three. In the last frame of the session, Zhao broke the runner of a corner pocket while potting the black, causing balls that had already been pocketed to roll onto the floor. After the first session, O'Sullivan replaced the titanium ferrule of his cue with a brass ferrule, also replacing his cue tip. Zhao made two centuries and five half-centuries in the second session as he won all eight frames for a 12–4 lead. O'Sullivan won the first two frames of the third session, but Zhao won five of the last six, making a century and four half-centuries as he secured a 17–7 victory. Zhao became only the second player, after John Parrott in 1994, to defeat O'Sullivan with a session to spare. "In the past, when I played Ronnie [O'Sullivan], I'd get nervous because I really wanted to win, but I didn't put too much pressure on myself this time," said Zhao afterwards. "Today I felt a lot more relaxed and enjoyed it, and I ended up playing pretty well." O'Sullivan said: "I just felt like I never gave him a game, so that's a bit disappointing." He added: "Zhao deserved his victory. I think he's done brilliantly all tournament".

Making his eighth appearance in the semi-finals, Williams, aged 50, was the oldest player to reach the final four since Ray Reardon, who was 52 at the 1985 event. He played Trump, who was making his sixth semi-final appearance. Williams and Trump had previously contested a World Championship semi-final at the 2022 event, which Trump won 17–16. The Guardian described the first session of the match as "error-strewn" and "edgy", with "mistakes made time and again" by both players. Williams drew level at 2–2 and 3–3, but Trump took a fragmented seventh frame on the colours and won the last of the session with a century to lead 5–3. Trump won the first two frames of the second session to move 7–3 ahead, but Williams won five of the next six as he tied the scores at 8–8. In the third session, Trump moved 10–9 ahead, but Williams won four of the last five frames to lead 13–11. In the final session, Williams won three of the first four frames to lead 16–12. Trump won the next two; his 116 century in the 30th frame was his 3rd of the match, 14th of the tournament, 100th at the Crucible, and 107th of the season, setting a new season record. Williams then secured a 17–14 victory with a 123 century, his fourth of the match. "I have played well all through the tournament," said Williams afterwards, adding: "I have to be proud of myself because there are not many who could beat Judd [Trump] over such a long match." "Mark [Williams] was the more consistent player throughout and in the end he really deserved the win," Trump said afterwards, adding: "I tried my heart out and just ran out of steam." Trump finished the season with prize money of £1,680,600, a new record.

==== Final ====
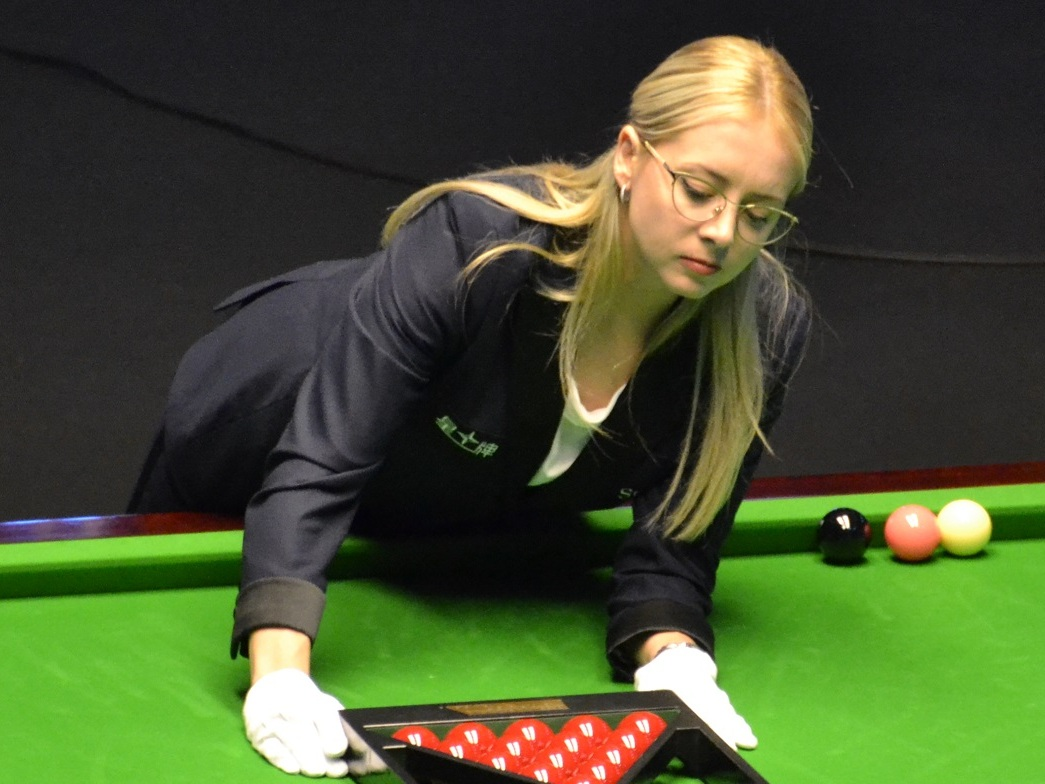
Desislava Bozhilova (pictured in 2023) became the second woman to referee a World Championship final and the first to referee the finals of all three Triple Crown events.

The best-of-35-frame final took place over four sessions on 4 and 5 May between the sixth seed Williams and qualifier Zhao. At age 50, Williams was the oldest player to contest a World Championship final, surpassing Reardon, who had played in the 1982 final at age 49. He was competing in his fifth world final, having previously won the title in 2000, 2003, and 2018 and been runner-up in 1999. The second player from China to reach a world final, after Ding at the 2016 event, Zhao was competing in his third ranking final and second Triple Crown final, following his wins at the 2021 UK Championship and the 2022 German Masters. The first final in World Championship history between two left-handed players, it also featured the largest age gap (22 years) between two world finalists. Bulgarian referee Desislava Bozhilova officiated her first World Championship final. She was the second woman to referee a world final—after Michaela Tabb in 2009 and 2012—and the first woman to officiate the finals of all three Triple Crown events, having previously taken charge of the 2022 Masters and 2022 UK Championship finals.

BBC Sport journalist Steve Sutcliffe described Williams as "out of sorts" in the first session, which Zhao dominated, making two centuries and three half-centuries as he won seven of the eight frames played. Williams lost the third frame after a battle on the last black ball; he also had an opportunity to take the sixth, but missed the penultimate red while on a break of 61—his only half-century of the session—and Zhao cleared to win the frame. Zhao's 104 century in frame seven was his 18th of the tournament, including the qualifying rounds, equalling the record set by Ding at the 2016 event. In the second session, Williams won five of the nine frames played, making three half-centuries while Zhao made four. In the 16th frame, Williams was on a break of 63 when he missed a red, and Zhao won the frame with a 71 clearance. Zhao ended the session with a five-frame overnight lead at 11–6. No player had ever recovered from an overnight deficit of five or more frames in a world final at the Crucible. Zhao extended his lead in the third session, making three half-centuries as he won six of the eight frames played. Williams won frame 23 with a 66 break, his only half-century of the session, to avoid becoming the first player since Jimmy White in 1993 to lose a world final with a session to spare. Zhao ended the third session 17–8 ahead. Williams began the last session with his only century of the match, a 101. He made further half-centuries of 96 and 73 as he won four consecutive frames, reducing Zhao's lead to 17–12. Zhao then made an 87 break to secure an 18–12 victory, winning his first world title, second Triple Crown title, and third ranking title.

The first World Champion from China and also the first from Asia, Zhao became the fifth winner in the sport's modern era from outside the United Kingdom, following Canada's Cliff Thorburn in 1980, Ireland's Ken Doherty in 1997, Australia's Neil Robertson in 2010, and Belgium's Brecel in 2023. The fourth qualifier to win the World Championship, after Alex Higgins in 1972, Terry Griffiths in 1979, and Murphy in 2005, he set a new record for the most matches won to claim the title, four in the qualifying rounds and five at the main stage. Overall, he played a total of 172 frames at the event, winning 111. Aged 28 years and 32 days, he was the youngest winner since Murphy in 2005. Hailing Zhao as "a new superstar of the game", Williams commented afterwards: "Unfortunately I was just never in the final from day one. I was behind from the start and could not get into it." Zhao said: "In the last frame, I just wanted to clean up the table, then I was very happy. When we shook hands I was nearly crying. It's very good for Chinese snooker, and I am happy I have done this for the people there." Jason Ferguson, chair of the World Professional Billiards and Snooker Association (WPBSA), stated that Zhao's victory—given the popularity of snooker in China—would increase the chances of snooker becoming an Olympic sport at the 2032 Summer Olympics in Brisbane, Australia. Writing in The New York Times, Tim Spiers commented on the impact of Zhao's win, saying that "In a sport deep-seated in tradition and history, a new era may have begun in snooker". Neil Squires in The Times also saw the tournament as a watershed moment for the sport, saying that "The glass ceiling has been smashed with a Chinese world champion. Where Zhao leads, others will surely follow."

==== Rankings controversy ====
Zhao was the first player to win a ranking event while competing as an amateur, which led to a controversy about his world ranking for the following season. In a BBC interview with Hazel Irvine and Doherty, WPBSA chair Ferguson stated that Zhao would retain ranking points from the event. However, Doherty stated that "a lot of players" were "up in arms" about the issue and questioned whether the rules had been changed, suggesting that Zhao "should be going back to scratch" in terms of ranking points. In social media posts, some other professional players highlighted rules from the tournament entry pack, stating that an amateur player's ranking points "always reset to zero at the start of each season", implying that Zhao should begin the 2025–26 season with no retained points. Speaking on a podcast, Murphy called the World Snooker Tour's position "jaw-dropping" and accused it of "riding roughshod over [the] players' contract."

In a statement, the WST acknowledged that the wording of the tournament rules "could have been clearer" but claimed: "The principle clearly established in snooker is that amateurs can earn prize money and ranking points in the same way that professionals do, and there are many precedents for this." Zhao entered the world rankings at number 11 after the event, which meant that Carter fell out of the top 16. The WPBSA and WST jointly announced that since Zhao had regained professional status via his ranking points from the event, the tour card he had earned by topping the 2024‍‍–‍25 Q Tour Europe rankings would go instead to Dylan Emery, who had finished second in those rankings.

== Main draw ==
The draw for the main tournament is shown below. The numbers in parentheses after the players' names denote the seedings for the 16 seeded players (1–16) and the rankings (in italics) for the unseeded players; an "a" indicates amateur players not on the main tour (i.e. without a world ranking). The match winners are shown in bold.

**Round 1 (Last 32)**; Best of 19 frames
19 April
Kyren Wilson (ENG) (1) | 9
**Lei Peifan (CHN) (39)** | **10**
20 & 21 April
Jak Jones (WAL) (16) | 4
**Zhao Xintong (CHN) (a)** | **10**
19 & 20 April
Neil Robertson (AUS) (9) | 8
**Chris Wakelin (ENG) (20)** | **10**
20 & 21 April
**Mark Allen (NIR) (8)** | **10**
Fan Zhengyi (CHN) (46) | 6
22 & 23 April
**Ronnie O'Sullivan (ENG) (5)** | **10**
Ali Carter (ENG) (18) | 4
22 & 23 April
Zhang Anda (CHN) (12) | 7
**Pang Junxu (CHN) (27)** | **10**
21 & 22 April
**Si Jiahui (CHN) (13)** | **10**
David Gilbert (ENG) (23) | 6
23 & 24 April
Mark Selby (ENG) (4) | 8
**Ben Woollaston (ENG) (44)** | **10**
21 April
**John Higgins (SCO) (3)** | **10**
Joe O'Connor (ENG) (30) | 7
19 & 20 April
**Xiao Guodong (CHN) (14)** | **10**
Matthew Selt (ENG) (34) | 4
19 & 20 April
Barry Hawkins (ENG) (11) | 9
**Hossein Vafaei (IRN) (24)** | **10**
19 & 20 April
**Mark Williams (WAL) (6)** | **10**
Wu Yize (CHN) (22) | 8
23 & 24 April
**Luca Brecel (BEL) (7)** | **10**
Ryan Day (WAL) (36) | 7
21 & 22 April
**Ding Junhui (CHN) (10)** | **10**
Zak Surety (ENG) (73) | 7
22 & 23 April
**Shaun Murphy (ENG) (15)** | **10**
Daniel Wells (WAL) (49) | 4
22 & 23 April
**Judd Trump (ENG) (2)** | **10**
Zhou Yuelong (CHN) (32) | 4

**Round 2 (Last 16)**; Best of 25 frames
25, 26 & 27 April
Lei Peifan (CHN) (39) | 10
**Zhao Xintong (CHN) (a)** | **13**
24 & 25 April
**Chris Wakelin (ENG) (20)** | **13**
Mark Allen (NIR) (8) | 6
26, 27 & 28 April
**Ronnie O'Sullivan (ENG) (5)** | **13**
Pang Junxu (CHN) (27) | 4
26, 27 & 28 April
**Si Jiahui (CHN) (13)** | **13**
Ben Woollaston (ENG) (44) | 10
24, 25 & 26 April
**John Higgins (SCO) (3)** | **13**
Xiao Guodong (CHN) (14) | 12
25 & 26 April
Hossein Vafaei (IRN) (24) | 10
**Mark Williams (WAL) (6)** | **13**
26, 27 & 28 April
**Luca Brecel (BEL) (7)** | **13**
Ding Junhui (CHN) (10) | 4
27 & 28 April
Shaun Murphy (ENG) (15) | 10
**Judd Trump (ENG) (2)** | **13**

**Quarter-finals**; Best of 25 frames
29 & 30 April
**Zhao Xintong (CHN) (a)** | **13**
Chris Wakelin (ENG) (20) | 5
29 & 30 April
**Ronnie O'Sullivan (ENG) (5)** | **13**
Si Jiahui (CHN) (13) | 9
29 & 30 April
John Higgins (SCO) (3) | 12
**Mark Williams (WAL) (6)** | **13**
29 & 30 April
Luca Brecel (BEL) (7) | 8
**Judd Trump (ENG) (2)** | **13**

**Semi-finals**; Best of 33 frames
1 & 2 May
**Zhao Xintong (CHN) (a)** | **17**
Ronnie O'Sullivan (ENG) (5) | 7
1, 2 & 3 May
**Mark Williams (WAL) (6)** | **17**
Judd Trump (ENG) (2) | 14

**Final**; Best of 35 frames
4 & 5 May
**Zhao Xintong (CHN) (a)** | **18**
Mark Williams (WAL) (6) | 12

=== Final ===
Final: (Best of 35 frames) Crucible Theatre, Sheffield, 4 & 5 May 2025; Referee: Desislava Bozhilova
| **Zhao Xintong** (a); China | | | | **18**–12 | | | Mark Williams (6); Wales | | | |
Session 1: **7**–1 (**7**–1)
| Frame | 1 | 2 | 3 | 4 | 5 | 6 | 7 | 8 | 9 | 10 |
| Zhao | **141**† (51, 77) | **100**† (100) | **47**† | 28 | **77**† (57) | **71**† | **119**† (104) | **95**† (83) | N/A | N/A |
| Williams | 0 | 38 | 44 | **66**† | 49 | 61 (61) | 0 | 0 | N/A | N/A |
Session 2: 4–**5** (**11**–6)
| Frame | 1 | 2 | 3 | 4 | 5 | 6 | 7 | 8 | 9 | 10 |
| Zhao | 0 | 8 | **85**† (71) | **74**† (56) | 14 | 0 | **96**† (96) | **71**† (71) | 43 | N/A |
| Williams | **86**† (86) | **65**† | 9 | 0 | **62**† | **72**† (72) | 23 | 63 (63) | **71**† | N/A |
Session 3: **6**–2 (**17**–8)
| Frame | 1 | 2 | 3 | 4 | 5 | 6 | 7 | 8 | 9 | 10 |
| Zhao | **76**† | 18 | **65**† (58) | **85**† | **104**† (52) | 14 | **79**† (67) | **63**† | N/A | N/A |
| Williams | 5 | **66**† | 7 | 45 | 1 | **84**† (66) | 26 | 36 | N/A | N/A |
Session 4: 1–**4** (**18**–12)
| Frame | 1 | 2 | 3 | 4 | 5 | 6 | 7 | 8 | 9 | 10 |
| Zhao | 30 | 1 | 6 | 0 | **110**† (87) | N/A | N/A | N/A | N/A | N/A |
| Williams | **101**† (101) | **62**† | **96**† (96) | **73**† (73) | 8 | N/A | N/A | N/A | N/A | N/A |
| (frame 7) **104** | | | | Highest break | | | 101 (frame 26) | | | |
| **2** | | | | Century breaks | | | 1 | | | |
| **14** | | | | 50+ breaks | | | 8 | | | |
(China) Zhao Xintong wins the 2025 Halo World Snooker Championship † = Winner of frame

== Qualifying draw ==
The results of the qualifying rounds are shown below. The numbers in parentheses after the players' names denote the world ranking position for each player; an "a" indicates amateur players not on the main tour (i.e. without a world ranking). The match winners are shown in bold.

**Round 1 (Last 144)**; Best of 19 frames
**Hammad Miah (ENG) (81)** | **10**
Jonas Luz (BRA) (117) | 0
**Huang Jiahao (CHN) (112)** | **10**
Amaan Iqbal (SCO) (a) | 4
Amir Sarkhosh (IRN) (96) | 2
**Mateusz Baranowski (POL) (a)** | **10**
Artemijs Žižins (LAT) (97) | 4
**Dylan Emery (WAL) (a)** | **10**
Chris Totten (SCO) (104) | 7
**Mitchell Mann (ENG) (113)** | **10**
**Antoni Kowalski (POL) (89)** | **10**
Reanne Evans (ENG) (114) | 4
**Wang Yuchen (HKG) (105)** | **10**
Brian Cini (MLT) (a) | 5
**Duane Jones (WAL) (88)** | **10**
Florian Nüßle (AUT) (a) | 9
**Liam Graham (SCO) (85)** | **10**
Fergal Quinn (NIR) (a) | 9
**Robbie McGuigan (NIR) (108)** | **10**
Hatem Yassen (EGY) (119) | 6
**Ben Mertens (BEL) (92)** | **10**
Daniel Womersley (ENG) (a) | 5
Cheung Ka Wai (HKG) (101) | 3
**Zhao Xintong (CHN) (a)** | **10**
**Liam Davies (WAL) (100)** | **10**
Ahmed Aly Elsayed (USA) (122) | 2
**Sunny Akani (THA) (93)** | **10**
Kreishh Gurbaxani (IND) (116) | 3
**Farakh Ajaib (PAK) (109)** | **10**
Baipat Siripaporn (THA) (121) | 2
**Alexander Ursenbacher (SUI) (84)** | **10**
Paul Deaville (ENG) (a) | 6
**Oliver Lines (ENG) (83)** | **10**
Mohammed Shehab (UAE) (120) | 8
**Manasawin Phetmalaikul (THA) (110)** | **10**
Leone Crowley (IRL) (a) | 3
Andrew Pagett (WAL) (94) | 2
**Iulian Boiko (UKR) (a)** | **10**
**Allan Taylor (ENG) (99)** | **10**
Joshua Thomond (ENG) (a) | 7
**Julien Leclercq (BEL) (102)** | **10**
Zhou Jinhao (CHN) (a) | 7
**Jimmy White (ENG) (91)** | **10**
Anton Kazakov (UKR) (a) | 9
Mostafa Dorgham (EGY) (107) | 7
**Simon Blackwell (ENG) (a)** | **10**
**Andrew Higginson (ENG) (86)** | **10**
Ryan Thomerson (AUS) (a) | 7
**Gong Chenzhi (CHN) (87)** | **10**
Kaylan Patel (ENG) (a) | 7
**Haris Tahir (PAK) (106)** | **10**
Joshua Cooper (ENG) (a) | 6
Liam Pullen (ENG) (90) | 5
**Gao Yang (CHN) (a)** | **10**
Haydon Pinhey (ENG) (103) | 3
**Ken Doherty (IRL) (118)** | **10**
Bulcsú Révész (HUN) (98) | 2
**Steven Hallworth (ENG) (a)** | **10**
**Dean Young (SCO) (95)** | **10**
Michał Szubarczyk (POL) (a) | 8
Bai Yulu (CHN) (111) | 3
**Liam Highfield (ENG) (a)** | **10**
**Ian Burns (ENG) (82)** | **10**
Mink Nutcharut (THA) (115) | 4

**Round 2 (Last 112)**; Best of 19 frames
Rory Thor (MAS) (80) | 9
**Hammad Miah (ENG) (81)** | **10**
**Daniel Wells (WAL) (49)** | **10**
Huang Jiahao (CHN) (112) | 6
**Ishpreet Singh Chadha (IND) (65)** | **10**
Mateusz Baranowski (POL) (a) | 2
**Joe Perry (ENG) (64)** | **10**
Dylan Emery (WAL) (a) | 6
Liu Hongyu (CHN) (57) | 2
**Mitchell Mann (ENG) (113)** | **10**
**Zak Surety (ENG) (73)** | **10**
Antoni Kowalski (POL) (89) | 2
Graeme Dott (SCO) (56) (Note: Graeme Dott was suspended by the WPBSA on 9 April, so Wang Yuchen received a walkover to the third round of qualifying.) | w/d
**Wang Yuchen (HKG) (105)** | **w/o**
Ma Hailong (CHN) (73) | 1
**Duane Jones (WAL) (88)** | **10**
**Ross Muir (SCO) (76)** | **10**
Liam Graham (SCO) (85) | 5
**Mark Davis (ENG) (53)** | **10**
Robbie McGuigan (NIR) (108) | 7
**Marco Fu (HKG) (69)** | **10**
Ben Mertens (BEL) (92) | 4
Long Zehuang (CHN) (60) | 8
**Zhao Xintong (CHN) (a)** | **10**
**Sanderson Lam (ENG) (61)** | **10**
Liam Davies (WAL) (100) | 9
David Grace (ENG) (68) | 9
**Sunny Akani (THA) (93)** | **10**
**Jordan Brown (NIR) (52)** | **10**
Farakh Ajaib (PAK) (109) | 6
**Xing Zihao (CHN) (77)** | **10**
Alexander Ursenbacher (SUI) (84) | 6
**Michael Holt (ENG) (78)** | **10**
Oliver Lines (ENG) (83) | 8
**Robbie Williams (ENG) (51)** | **10**
Manasawin Phetmalaikul (THA) (110) | 4
Louis Heathcote (ENG) (67) | 9
**Iulian Boiko (UKR) (a)** | **10**
Jamie Clarke (WAL) (62) | 8
**Allan Taylor (ENG) (99)** | **10**
**Jamie Jones (WAL) (59)** | **10**
Julien Leclercq (BEL) (102) | 7
**Ashley Carty (ENG) (70)** | **10**
Jimmy White (ENG) (91) | 5
**Matthew Stevens (WAL) (54)** | **10**
Simon Blackwell (ENG) (a) | 3
**Jiang Jun (CHN) (75)** | **10**
Andrew Higginson (ENG) (86) | 5
Stuart Carrington (ENG) (74) | 8
**Gong Chenzhi (CHN) (87)** | **10**
**Aaron Hill (IRL) (55)** | **10**
Haris Tahir (PAK) (106) | 0
Tian Pengfei (CHN) (71) | 6
**Gao Yang (CHN) (a)** | **10**
**David Lilley (ENG) (58)** | **10**
Ken Doherty (IRL) (118) | 2
**Anthony Hamilton (ENG) (63)** | **10**
Steven Hallworth (ENG) (a) | 8
**Stan Moody (ENG) (66)** | **10**
Dean Young (SCO) (95) | 3
**He Guoqiang (CHN) (50)** | **10**
Liam Highfield (ENG) (a) | 3
Alfie Burden (ENG) (79) | 4
**Ian Burns (ENG) (82)** | **10**

**Round 3 (Last 80)**; Best of 19 frames
**Gary Wilson (ENG) (17)** | **10**
Hammad Miah (ENG) (81) | 1
Dominic Dale (WAL) (48) | 4
**Daniel Wells (WAL) (49)** | **10**
**Zhou Yuelong (CHN) (32)** | **10**
Ishpreet Singh Chadha (IND) (65) | 5
**Yuan Sijun (CHN) (33)** | **10**
Joe Perry (ENG) (64) | 5
**Ricky Walden (ENG) (40)** | **10**
Mitchell Mann (ENG) (113) | 9
Jack Lisowski (ENG) (25) | 8
**Zak Surety (ENG) (73)** | **10**
Robert Milkins (ENG) (41) | 5
**Wang Yuchen (HKG) (105)** | **10**
**Hossein Vafaei (IRN) (24)** | **10**
Duane Jones (WAL) (88) | 7
Tom Ford (ENG) (21) | 7
**Ross Muir (SCO) (76)** | **10**
**Ben Woollaston (ENG) (44)** | **10**
Mark Davis (ENG) (53) | 9
**Elliot Slessor (ENG) (28)** | **10**
Marco Fu (HKG) (69) | 6
Lyu Haotian (CHN) (37) | 4
**Zhao Xintong (CHN) (a)** | **10**
**Ryan Day (WAL) (36)** | **10**
Sanderson Lam (ENG) (61) | 5
Noppon Saengkham (THA) (29) | 7
**Sunny Akani (THA) (93)** | **10**
**Martin O'Donnell (ENG) (45)** | **10**
Jordan Brown (NIR) (52) | 8
**Chris Wakelin (ENG) (20)** | **10**
Xing Zihao (CHN) (77) | 5
Stuart Bingham (ENG) (19) | 6
**Michael Holt (ENG) (78)** | **10**
**Fan Zhengyi (CHN) (46)** | **10**
Robbie Williams (ENG) (51) | 6
**Joe O'Connor (ENG) (30)** | **10**
Iulian Boiko (UKR) (a) | 4
**Jackson Page (WAL) (35)** | **10**
Allan Taylor (ENG) (99) | 2
Xu Si (CHN) (38) | 7
**Jamie Jones (WAL) (59)** | **10**
**Pang Junxu (CHN) (27)** | **10**
Ashley Carty (ENG) (70) | 2
Thepchaiya Un-Nooh (THA) (43) | 8
**Matthew Stevens (WAL) (54)** | **10**
**Wu Yize (CHN) (22)** | **10**
Jiang Jun (CHN) (75) | 4
**David Gilbert (ENG) (23)** | **10**
Gong Chenzhi (CHN) (87) | 6
Anthony McGill (SCO) (42) | 5
**Aaron Hill (IRL) (55)** | **10**
Stephen Maguire (SCO) (26) | 3
**Gao Yang (CHN) (a)** | **10**
**Lei Peifan (CHN) (39)** | **10**
David Lilley (ENG) (58) | 6
**Matthew Selt (ENG) (34)** | **10**
Anthony Hamilton (ENG) (63) | 3
**Jimmy Robertson (ENG) (31)** | **10**
Stan Moody (ENG) (66) | 9
Scott Donaldson (SCO) (47) | 9
**He Guoqiang (CHN) (50)** | **10**
**Ali Carter (ENG) (18)** | **10**
Ian Burns (ENG) (82) | 8

**Round 4 (Last 48)**; Best of 19 frames
Gary Wilson (ENG) (17) | 9
**Daniel Wells (WAL) (49)** | **10**
**Zhou Yuelong (CHN) (32)** | **10**
Yuan Sijun (CHN) (33) | 5
Ricky Walden (ENG) (40) | 3
**Zak Surety (ENG) (73)** | **10**
Wang Yuchen (HKG) (105) | 4
**Hossein Vafaei (IRN) (24)** | **10**
Ross Muir (SCO) (76) | 4
**Ben Woollaston (ENG) (44)** | **10**
Elliot Slessor (ENG) (28) | 8
**Zhao Xintong (CHN) (a)** | **10**
**Ryan Day (WAL) (36)** | **10**
Sunny Akani (THA) (93) | 5
Martin O'Donnell (ENG) (45) | 2
**Chris Wakelin (ENG) (20)** | **10**
Michael Holt (ENG) (78) | 4
**Fan Zhengyi (CHN) (46)** | **10**
**Joe O'Connor (ENG) (30)** | **10**
Jackson Page (WAL) (35) | 7
Jamie Jones (WAL) (59) | 6
**Pang Junxu (CHN) (27)** | **10**
Matthew Stevens (WAL) (54) | 9
**Wu Yize (CHN) (22)** | **10**
**David Gilbert (ENG) (23)** | **10**
Aaron Hill (IRL) (55) | 9
Gao Yang (CHN) (a) | 9
**Lei Peifan (CHN) (39)** | **10**
**Matthew Selt (ENG) (34)** | **10**
Jimmy Robertson (ENG) (31) | 9
He Guoqiang (CHN) (50) | 5
**Ali Carter (ENG) (18)** | **10**

Note: w/o = walkover; w/d = withdrawn

== Century breaks ==
=== Main stage centuries ===
A total of 107 century breaks were made during the main stage of the tournament. This was the third-highest total in the tournament's history, after the 109 centuries made at the 2022 event and the 108 made at the 2021 event.

- 147, 105, 102, 102, 100 – Mark Allen
- 142, 128, 115, 112, 104, 100 – Zhao Xintong
- 141, 116, 110, 107 – Ding Junhui
- 138, 133, 112, 103, 100 – Shaun Murphy
- 136, 120 – Wu Yize
- 136, 110, 109, 104 – Zak Surety
- 136, 106 – Kyren Wilson
- 135, 131, 123, 121, 117, 107, 105 – Ronnie O'Sullivan
- 135, 100 – Mark Selby
- 132, 123, 115, 110, 107, 104 – Hossein Vafaei
- 132, 117, 116, 116, 115, 114, 114, 113, 110, 109, 106, 106, 104, 100 – Judd Trump
- 131, 129, 114, 114, 101 – John Higgins
- 131, 115, 109 – Daniel Wells
- 131, 106 – Matthew Selt
- 130, 120 – Lei Peifan
- 128, 121, 114, 104, 100 – Luca Brecel
- 126, 101, 100 – Si Jiahui
- 126, 101 – Ryan Day
- 123, 122, 116, 115, 105, 104, 101, 101, 100 – Mark Williams
- 120, 114, 109 – Xiao Guodong
- 119, 111, 102 – Pang Junxu
- 119, 108 – Chris Wakelin
- 117, 100 – Neil Robertson
- 110, 100 – Ben Woollaston
- 107 – Ali Carter
- 106 – Barry Hawkins
- 104, 102 – David Gilbert
- 103 – Fan Zhengyi
- 100 – Jak Jones
- 100 – Joe O'Connor

=== Qualifying stage centuries ===
A total of 143 century breaks were made during the qualifying rounds. This was a record surpassing the previous number of 135 set during the qualifying rounds for the 2023 World Championship.

- 147, 147, 131, 109 – Jackson Page
- 143, 107, 100, 100 – Robbie Williams
- 142 – Julien Leclercq
- 141, 137, 134, 132, 128, 127, 122, 116, 112, 108, 103, 100 – Zhao Xintong
- 141, 109, 102 – Ian Burns
- 140, 135, 123, 113, 111, 108, 104 – Hossein Vafaei
- 140 – Stuart Carrington
- 139, 138 – Marco Fu
- 139, 133, 108, 103, 102, 100 – Zak Surety
- 139, 127, 122, 113, 105, 103 – Wu Yize
- 138, 103, 100 – Stan Moody
- 137, 133, 126, 102 – Sanderson Lam
- 136, 120 – Gao Yang
- 136, 118 – Alexander Ursenbacher
- 135, 133, 123, 104 – Fan Zhengyi
- 135, 102, 100 – He Guoqiang
- 135 – Oliver Lines
- 134, 129, 104 – Joe Perry
- 134, 107 – Andrew Higginson
- 133, 105 – Jack Lisowski
- 133 – Matthew Stevens
- 132, 105 – Wang Yuchen
- 132 – Long Zehuang
- 131, 126, 114, 113 – Elliot Slessor
- 131 – Dominic Dale
- 130, 111 – Noppon Saengkham
- 130 – Michael Holt
- 129, 128 – Iulian Boiko
- 129, 101, 100 – Gary Wilson
- 128, 106, 105 – Jamie Jones
- 126, 106, 101 – Dean Young
- 126 – Jimmy White
- 125, 106 – Jimmy Robertson
- 124 – Ricky Walden
- 123, 102 – Lei Peifan
- 122 – Jordan Brown
- 122 – Ishpreet Singh Chadha
- 118, 117, 104 – Zhou Yuelong
- 118, 102 – Mitchell Mann
- 118 – David Gilbert
- 118 – Liu Hongyu
- 116 – Tom Ford
- 115 – Haris Tahir
- 114 – Alfie Burden
- 112, 102 – Matthew Selt
- 111, 110 – Allan Taylor
- 111 – Dylan Emery
- 109, 102 – Jiang Jun
- 109 – Farakh Ajaib
- 109 – Stephen Maguire
- 109 – Yuan Sijun
- 108, 106 – Xu Si
- 107 – Pang Junxu
- 107 – Amir Sarkhosh
- 106 – Daniel Wells
- 105 – Sunny Akani
- 105 – Mark Davis
- 105 – Aaron Hill
- 104, 103 – Hammad Miah
- 104, 101 – Ryan Day
- 104 – Mateusz Baranowski
- 104 – Simon Blackwell
- 104 – Ben Woollaston
- 103 – Ashley Carty
- 103 – Scott Donaldson
- 101 – Rory Thor
- 100 – David Lilley
- 100 – Joe O'Connor
