= United States Championships =

United States Championships or United States Championship may refer to:

- IWGP United States Championship, professional wrestling
- NHRA U.S. Nationals, drag racing
- U.S. Chess Championship, invitational tournament
- U.S. Figure Skating Championships
- US Indoor Championships, women's tennis, 1907–2001
- US PGA Championship, golf
- USA Indoor Track and Field Championships
- USA Outdoor Track and Field Championships
- United States Nordic Combined Championships, skiing
- United States Open Championship, golf
- United States Open Tennis Championships
- United States Road Racing Championship
- United States Swimming Championships
- United States bandy championship
- WWE United States Championship, professional wrestling
- WWE Women's United States Championship, professional wrestling

== See also ==
- United States Amateur Championships (disambiguation)
- U.S. National Championships (disambiguation)
