= Corey Deuel =

American professional pool player

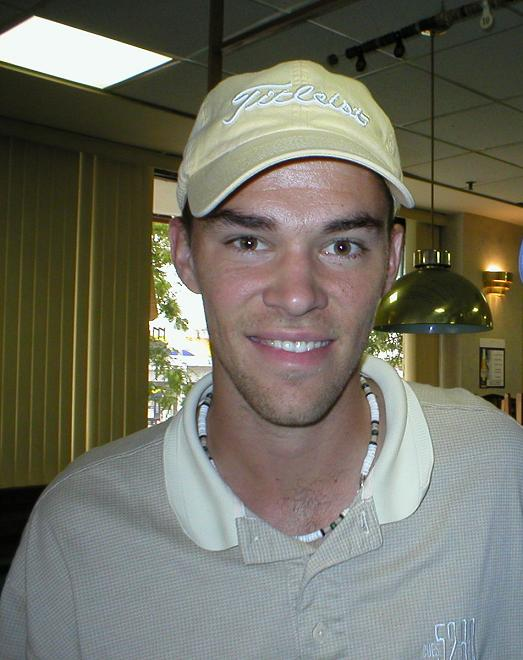
- Deuel at the 2003 Big Apple Championship

Personal information
- Nickname: "Prince of Pool"
- Born: 20 November 1977 (age 48) Santa Barbara, California, U.S.

Pool career
- Country: United States
- Turned pro: 1995
- Best finish: Semi finals 2000 WPA World Nine-ball Championship

Tournament wins
- Major: 2001 US OPEN 9-Ball Champion (11-0 over Immonen)

Corey Deuel (born November 20, 1977) is an American professional pool player from West Jefferson, Ohio. Nicknamed "Prince of Pool", he won the US Open Nine-ball Championship in 2001, and has won many other major titles. In January 2008, he was ranked the second highest US pool player by the United States Professional Poolplayers Association. He regularly represents the US in the Mosconi Cup. In 2010, he again was selected for the US team in the Mosconi Cup and was responsible for winning 2 of the US team's 8 points in the event. His tournament walk-on music is "Disco Inferno" by the Trammps.

His reported career earnings to February 2008 were approximately $562,000. His worst professional year was 2003, in which he did not win a single major event.

"Soft breaking" and "pattern racking" are techniques that have been used by Deuel and others as a strategy to gain an advantage in tournament competitions. Pattern racking refers to purposefully racking the balls in strategic positions to take advantage of where those balls typically head. Pattern racking is illegal and unethical unless tournament rules specifically allow it.

In 2013, he made a successful crossover to snooker by capturing the United States Amateur Championship title in Houston, Texas, and went on to represent the United States in the 2013 IBSF World Snooker Championship.

== Early life ==
At the age of 14, Deuel began playing pool at Drexeline Billiards in Drexel Hill, Pennsylvania, before taking to the road in his teen years.

== Snooker career ==
In 2013, Deuel decided to cross over to snooker. He entered in the United States National Snooker Championship and went on to win the event. His victory meant he automatically qualified as the United States entrant for the 2013 IBSF World Snooker Championship where he was eliminated in the round-robin stage after finishing 5th in his group.

Deuel entered the World Snooker 2014 Q School qualification tournament in an attempt to win himself a 2-year tour card to play on the professional World Snooker Tour. He lost in the second round to the former world number 70 Daniel Wells in the first event and lost 2–4 to Martin Ball in the second event.

Deuel later competed in the 2015 Xuzhou Open in China, but was eliminated in the first round after losing 2–4 to the world number 81 Zhou Yuelong.

Deuel re-entered the 2015 Q School qualification tournament in May 2015. Despite at one stage leading 3–1 and only needed one more frame to advance Deuel, lost 3–4 to Jamie Barrett in the second round of the first event.

He again entered Q School 2018 and lost in the first round of the first event to Haydon Pinhey.

== Pool career ==
Deuel has been competing professionally since 1995. He was a member of the International Pool Tour.

He was selected again for Team USA in the 2007 Mosconi Cup, after being on the team in the four previous years. He was not selected in 2008, but again represented his country during the 2009 tournament.

For 2007, he was ranked #9 in Pool & Billiard Magazine's "Fans' Top 20 Favorite Players" poll.

== Personal life ==
Deuel lived in West Jefferson, Ohio, in early 2008. He now resides in New Port Richey, Florida.

== Career titles & Achievements ==
- 1997 Viking 9-Ball Tour
- 1999 Camel Milwaukee 9-Ball Open
- 1999 Camel Time Warner Cable Open
- 1999 Viking 9-Ball Tour
- 2000 Viking Nine-ball Tour
- 2000 Northern Lights Nine-ball Shootout
- 2000 Mosconi Cup
- 2001 All Japan Championship 9-Ball
- 2001 BCA Open Nine-ball Championship
- 2001 Sands Regency 9-Ball Open
- 2001 U.S. Open 9-ball Championship
- 2001 Greater Columbus Open
- 2001 ESPN Sudden Death Seven-ball
- 2001 Mosconi Cup
- 2001 Billiards Digest Players of the Year
- 2002 UPA Atlanta Pro Open
- 2002 IBC Japan Nanki Classic
- 2003 Patriot Cup Border Battle
- 2004 ESPN Sudden Death Seven-ball
- 2004 Predator Central Florida Ring Game
- 2004 Derby City Classic Ring Game
- 2005 Fast Eddie's 9-Ball Tour
- 2005 UPA Pro Tour Championship
- 2006 Mosconi Cup (MVP)
- 2006 Relay for Life Nine-Ball Invitational
- 2007 Space Coast Open
- 2007 Super Billiards Expo Players Championship
- 2008 Million Dollar Shootout
- 2008 Seminole Florida Pro Tour
- 2009 Mosconi Cup
- 2009 Seminole Florida Pro Tour
- 2010 Turning Stone Classic
- 2010 Seminole Florida Pro Tour
- 2013 United States Amateur Snooker Championship
- 2013 Four Bears Classic 8-Ball
- 2013 Derby City Classic One Pocket
- 2014 CSI US Bar Table 8-Ball Championship
- 2014 Music City Classic
- 2014 Chuck Markulis Memorial One Pocket
- 2015 Smokin Aces Bar Box 9-Ball Open
- 2015 Chinook Winds Open 8-Ball Open
- 2017 ABN Dream Challenge Team USA vs. Russia
- 2017 GT Jam
- 2017 Four Bears Classic 8-Ball
- 2017 The Break Room's 8-Ball Classic
- 2018 ABN Dream Challenge Team USA vs. Russia
- 2018 Wyoming Open Triple Crown
- 2018 High Dessert Shootout 8-Ball
- 2018 Derby City Classic Bank Pool
- 2018 Mosconi Cup
- 2019 ABN Dream Challenge Team USA vs. Russia
- 2021 Texas Open Banks Ring Game
- 2024 The Americas Heyball Championship
- 2026 Billiard Congress of America Hall of Fame

Preceded by Earl Strickland	US Open Nine-ball Champion; 2001	Succeeded by Ralf Souquet
