= United States Amateur Championships =

United States Amateur Championship[s] or U.S. Amateur Championship[s] can refer to:

- United States Amateur Championships (tennis)
- United States Amateur Championship (golf)
- United States Amateur Championship (snooker)

== See also ==
- United States national amateur boxing championships, winner of the United States National Boxing Championships
