= U.S. National Championships =

U.S. National Championships may refer to:

- United States national amateur boxing championships
- United States Figure Skating Championships
- U.S. National Championships (tennis), before 1968, the tennis tournament now called the U.S. Open
- U.S. Open Pickleball Championships
- USA Gymnastics National Championships
- USA Outdoor Track and Field Championships
