= Ahmed Aly Elsayed =

American snooker player

Personal information
- Born: December 14, 1979 (age 46) Alexandria, Egypt

Sport
- Country: United States
- Sport: Snooker
- Professional: 2023–2025
- Highest ranking: 108 (July 2024)
- Best ranking finish: Last 128 (x22)

Ahmed Aly Elsayed (born 14 December 1979) is an American former professional snooker player who has won the United States Amateur Championship a record six times, having won three consecutive titles between 2009 and 2011, and another three consecutive titles between 2018 and 2021 (no tournament was held in 2020 due to the COVID-19 pandemic).

== Career ==
Born in Egypt, he began as a pool player, winning tournaments in Alexandria. His father, an officer in the Egyptian Army, introduced him to snooker, and Elsayed practiced the sport in an army club that featured snooker tables formerly owned by King Farouk. After earning a degree in civil engineering, he went to the United States, intending to compete in pool tournaments. He remained in the US, working at the New York Athletic Club, where he supervises the billiard room. He is a naturalized US citizen.

He participated in the 2022 World Seniors Championship at the Crucible Theatre in Sheffield, England, becoming the first American to compete at the Crucible. He lost in the first round to Wayne Cooper. He turned professional in the 2023–24 season after earning a two-year tour card by winning the 2022 Pan American Amateur Championship. Former world champion Cliff Thorburn and top snooker coach Chris Henry advised him on playing professionally.

== Outside snooker ==
In 2018, Elsayed played the part of a snooker player in The Nap at the Samuel J. Friedman Theatre, Broadway. The play was written by One Man, Two Guvnors playwright Richard Bean. Elsayed met his wife Amy, a stage manager, during his time appearing in the play.

== Performance and rankings timeline ==
| Tournament | 2021/ 22 | 2023/ 24 | 2024/ 25 |
|---|---|---|---|
| Ranking (Note: It shows the ranking at the beginning of the season) | (Note: He was an amateur) | (Note: New players on the Main Tour don't have a ranking) | 94 |
Ranking tournaments
| Championship League | A | RR | RR |
| Xi'an Grand Prix | Not Held | | LQ |
| Saudi Arabia Masters | Not Held | | 1R |
| English Open | A | LQ | LQ |
| British Open | A | LQ | LQ |
| Wuhan Open | NH | LQ | LQ |
| Northern Ireland Open | A | LQ | LQ |
| International Championship | NH | WD | LQ |
| UK Championship | A | LQ | LQ |
| Shoot Out | A | 1R | 1R |
| Scottish Open | A | LQ | LQ |
| German Masters | A | LQ | LQ |
| Welsh Open | A | LQ | LQ |
| World Open | NH | LQ | LQ |
| World Grand Prix | DNQ | DNQ | DNQ |
| Players Championship | DNQ | DNQ | DNQ |
| Tour Championship | DNQ | DNQ | DNQ |
| World Championship | A | LQ | LQ |
Non-ranking tournaments
| World Seniors Championship | 1R | A | A |
Former ranking tournaments
| European Masters | A | LQ | NH |

Performance Table Legend
| LQ | lost in the qualifying draw | #R | lost in the early rounds of the tournament (WR = Wildcard round, RR = Round robin) | QF | lost in the quarter-finals |
| SF | lost in the semi-finals | F | lost in the final | W | won the tournament |
| DNQ | did not qualify for the tournament | A | did not participate in the tournament | WD | withdrew from the tournament |

| NH / Not Held | means an event was not held. |
| NR / Non-Ranking Event | means an event is/was no longer a ranking event. |
| R / Ranking Event | means an event is/was a ranking event. |
| MR / Minor-Ranking Event | means an event is/was a minor-ranking event. |
| PA / Pro-am Event | means an event is/was a pro-am event. |

== Career finals ==
=== Amateur finals: 12 (8 titles) ===
| Outcome | No. | Year | Championship | Opponent in the final | Score |
|---|---|---|---|---|---|
| Winner | 1. | 2009 | United States Amateur Championship | (United States) Ajeya Prabhakar | 5–4 |
| Winner | 2. | 2010 | United States Amateur Championship (2) | (United States) Yi Fei Mei | 5–4 |
| Winner | 3. | 2011 | United States Amateur Championship (3) | (United States) Ajeya Prabhakar | 5–3 |
| Runner-up | 1. | 2015 | United States Amateur Championship | (United States) Sargon Isaac | 3–5 |
| Runner-up | 2. | 2016 | United States Amateur Championship (2) | (United States) Sargon Isaac | 1–5 |
| Runner-up | 3. | 2017 | United States Amateur Championship (3) | (United States) Raymond Fung | 4–5 |
| Winner | 4. | 2018 | United States Amateur Championship (4) | (United States) Raymond Fung | 5–2 |
| Winner | 5. | 2019 | United States Amateur Championship (5) | (United States) Cheang Ciing Yoo | 5–3 |
| Winner | 6. | 2021 | United States Amateur Championship (6) | (United States) Ajeya Prabhakar | 5–0 |
| Winner | 7. | 2021 | Pan American Amateur Championship - Masters | (Canada) Levi Meiller | 4–1 |
| Runner-up | 4. | 2022 | Pan American Amateur Championship - Masters | (Canada) Vito Puopolo | 0–3 |
| Winner | 8. | 2022 | Pan American Amateur Championship | (Canada) Amar Sadeg | 5–1 |
