= United States Professional Poolplayers Association =

UPA Logo

The United States Professional Poolplayers Association (UPA) is the governing body for the sport of men's professional pool in the United States, as well as the organizer of a major national amateur league, and a variety of pro and amateur tournaments. The organization, now based in Manhattan, was founded in January 2002 in Arizona by professional players, to replace several competing and dysfunctional men's professional pool organizations which had suffered years of problems such as inability to pay out winnings or to keep a stable schedule of competitions. UPA was formerly named the United States Pool Players Association, and has also frequently been unofficially referred to as USPPA or USPA, especially in reference to its professional side versus its amateur UPA League operations. The UPA Tour series of pro tournaments cover multiple pool disciplines, including eight-ball, nine-ball, ten-ball, and straight pool; the amateur UPA National Championships are team eight- and nine-ball events. The organization also offers instructional programs, and event promotion/production for pool tournaments and trade shows.

On the professional side, the Billiard Congress of America, which is the World Pool-Billiard Association (WPA) US-national affiliate, officially recognizes the UPA as the men's pro pool competition association for the United States, making it the present counterpart of the Women's Professional Billiards Association (WPBA). On the amateur side, UPA is one of a half-dozen or so major national leagues.

== UPA League ==
In the 2000s, UPA launched an amateur league program named the UPA League (originally the League of Champions); UPA describes it as "a pool league designed by professionals for the serious player." While it is mostly team-based, UPA also offers singles competition, and is not gender-or age-divided, which is an unusual lack of categorization. Most distinguishing of all is that league members can use their singles match records in the league to leverage their way into formal professional play as ranked UPA Touring Professional Program (UPA Tour) members, qualified to compete in pro-only events. For example, a record of 20 UPA League singles matches within the year, and payment of the UPA Tour membership fee, qualifies a player to compete in the Vegas Bar Box Championships.

Like most leagues, it operates on a local franchise licensing (for-profit) basis. Because the league uses a handicapping system (as found in most amateur leagues) that in UPA's case ranges from beginner to expert, professional players are actually eligible to play in the UPA League (with the maximum-skill-level handicap); this permissiveness is highly unusual in an amateur league in any sport. As in most leagues, membership is annually renewed, and active players also pay nightly dues on the nights they play (a portion of which goes into prize funds).

The league has an annual national amateur championship, held in Las Vegas, Nevada (where most other large US-based leagues do the same; a single events vendor/promoter warehouses thousands of Diamond and Valley-Dynamo "bar box" tables rented out by all of these events each year). The UPA National Championships are a week-long set of tournament brackets in various divisions, most of them team-based play but also featuring singles mini-tournaments. Various marketing materials also use the names UPA Nationals and UPA Las Vegas Nationals. The seventh annual UPA Nationals will be held June 22–28, 2020, at Binion's Casino, and offers a combined nine-ball and eight-ball prize fund of US$40,000 in the team competitions, which (depending on division) may pay out all the way down to 16th place. The dress code of the UPA Nationals is stricter than most amateur events, in that it requires matching team shirts.

== UPA Tour ==
The UPA Tour (in long form, the UPA Touring Professional Program) is a professional tournament series and player ranking system with an annual membership fee. Some events have more open registrations, especially when co-organized with other bodies, and all of them are open to certain qualifying UPA League players with 20 or more singles matches played in the current year.

The organization has previously co-sponsored other noteworthy events, including the 2005 World Summit of Pool.

== Other programs ==
The UPA also offers pool instruction by professionals via UPA Pool School events, held primarily in Las Vegas. The organization has also sometimes provided pool-related event promotion and production, including for tournaments and vendor exhibitions.
