= United States National Snooker Championship =

Tournament information
- Country: United States
- Established: 1991; 35 years ago
- Organisation(s): United States Snooker Association
- Format: National event
- Recent edition: 2026
- Current champion: Renat Denkha

The United States National Snooker Championship (occasionally known as the United States Amateur Championship) is an annual snooker competition played in the United States and is the highest ranking amateur event in the country

The competition was established in 1991 and was won by Tom Kollins, who went on to win the title again in 1992, 1998, 1999 and 2001. After the passing of Kollins in 2020, a new perpetual Championship trophy was named The Tom Kollins Trophy in his memory.

Both the winner and runner-up are selected to represent the United States in the following IBSF World Snooker Championship, and other annual invitational snooker events.

The Championship is open to U.S. citizens, and, from 2023, also U.S. permanent residents who have been a continuous resident of the United States for the past five years, and who have had no previous representation for another nation in any recognized international snooker competition.

The current champion is Renat Denkha from Chicago, after he won the 2026 Championship which was jointly staged in California at the PABSA Academy in Santa Clara and California Snooker in San Jose, from September 4-8. It was Denkha's third successive Championship title victory.

== Winners ==
Year	Winner	Runner-up	Final score	Venue	City
1991	Tom Kollins	John Abruzzo	4–2	Preacher's Pool & Billiards	Oakbrook Terrace, Illinois
1992	Tom Kollins	John Lewis	4–3	Pockets Billiards & Sports Bar	Aurora, Illinois
1993	David Yao	Mike Massey	5–0	Pockets Billiards & Sports Bar	Aurora, Illinois
1994	David Yao	Tom Kollins	5–2	Pockets Billiards & Sports Bar	Aurora, Illinois
1995	Tang Hoa	Orwin Ham	5–1	Embassy Billiards Club	San Gabriel, California
1996	Peter Ong	Piya Potanan	5–0	Embassy Billiards Club	San Gabriel, California
1997	George Lai	Truman Wu	5–3	Cue T's Snooker Club	Monterey Park, California
1998	Tom Kollins	Tom Karabotsos	5–4	Cue 'N' You	Grayslake, Illinois
1999	Tom Kollins	Murali Venkat	5–0	Cue 'N' You	Grayslake, Illinois
2000	Ajeya Prabhakar	Tom Kollins	5–3	Cue 'N' You	Grayslake, Illinois
2001	Tom Kollins	Ajeya Prabhakar	5–0	Cue 'N' You	Grayslake, Illinois
2004	Kenny Kwok	Raymond Fung	4–2	New York Athletic Club	Manhattan, New York
2005	George Lai	Kenny Kwok	4–2	Embassy Billiards Club	San Gabriel, California
2006	Paul Kimura	Romil Azemat	5–3	Embassy Billiards Club	San Gabriel, California
2007	Jack Kung	George Lai	5–3	Embassy Billiards Club	San Gabriel, California
2008	George Lai	Jian Qiang Wang	5–2	Embassy Billiards Club	San Gabriel, California
2009	Ahmed Aly Elsayed	Ajeya Prabhakar	5–4	Prince Snooker Club	Brooklyn, New York
2010	Ahmed Aly Elsayed	Yi Fei Mei	5–4	Embassy Billiards Club	San Gabriel, California
2011	Ahmed Aly Elsayed	Ajeya Prabhakar	5–3	Prince Snooker Club	Brooklyn, New York
2012	Sargon Isaac	Ajeya Prabhakar	5–2	Embassy Billiards Club	San Gabriel, California
2013	Corey Deuel	Sargon Isaac	5–1	Snooker 147 Bar & Grill	Houston, Texas
2014	Ajeya Prabhakar	Raymond Fung	5–2	Top 147 Snooker Club	Brooklyn, New York
2015	Sargon Isaac	Ahmed Aly Elsayed	5–3	Prince Snooker Club	Brooklyn, New York
2016	Sargon Isaac	Ahmed Aly Elsayed	5–1	147 Snooker Club	Houston, Texas
2017	Raymond Fung	Ahmed Aly Elsayed	5–4	New York Athletic Club	Manhattan, New York
2018	Ahmed Aly Elsayed	Raymond Fung	5–2	Prince Snooker Club	Brooklyn, New York
2019	Ahmed Aly Elsayed	Cheang Ciing Yoo	5–3	Q Ball Snooker & Pool	Houston, Texas
2021	Ahmed Aly Elsayed	Ajeya Prabhakar	5–0	New York Athletic Club	Manhattan, New York
2022	Steven Wong	Raymond Fung	5–3	Ox Billiards	Seattle, Washington
2023	Daren Taylor	Steven Wong	5–4	Embassy Billiards Club	San Gabriel, California
2024	Renat Denkha	Daren Taylor	5–1	Embassy Billiards Club	San Gabriel, California
2025	Renat Denkha	Ajeya Prabhakar	5–3	The Champion Snooker Club	Concord, California
2026	Renat Denkha	Hasanain Alsultani	5–4	PABSA Academy / California Snooker	Santa Clara, California / San Jose, California

== Stats ==
=== Finalists ===
Rank	Name	Winner	Runner-up	Finals
1	Ahmed Aly Elsayed	6	3	9
2	Tom Kollins (†)	5	2	7
=3	Sargon Isaac	3	1	4
=3	George Lai	3	1	4
5	Renat Denkha	3	0	3
6	Ajeya Prabhakar	2	6	8
7	David Yao (†)	2	0	2
8	Raymond Fung	1	4	5
=9	Kenny Kwok	1	1	2
=9	Steven Wong	1	1	2
=9	Daren Taylor	1	1	2
=12	Tang Hoa	1	0	1
=12	Peter Ong	1	0	1
=12	Paul Kimura (†)	1	0	1
=12	Jack Kung	1	0	1
=12	Corey Deuel	1	0	1
=17	Hasanain Alsultani	0	1	1
=17	Cheang Ciing Yoo	0	1	1
=17	John Abruzzo	0	1	1
=17	John Lewis	0	1	1
=17	Mike Massey	0	1	1
=17	Orwin Ham	0	1	1
=17	Piya Potanan	0	1	1
=17	Truman Wu	0	1	1
=17	Tom Karabotsos	0	1	1
=17	Murali Venkat	0	1	1
=17	Romil Azemat	0	1	1
=17	Jian Qiang Wang	0	1	1
=17	Yi Fei Mei	0	1	1
