= 1951 World Snooker Championship =

Tournament information
- Dates: 30 October 1950 – 24 February 1951
- Final venue: Tower Circus
- Final city: Blackpool
- Country: England
- Organisation: Billiards Association and Control Council
- Highest break: Walter Donaldson (SCO) (106)

Final
- Champion: Fred Davis (ENG)
- Runner-up: Walter Donaldson (SCO)
- Score: 58–39

Venues

The 1951 World Snooker Championship was a professional snooker tournament held from 30 October 1950 to 24 February 1951. John Barrie won the qualifying competition for three of the ten entrants at Burroughes Hall in London and joined the other seven players in the main draw. The quarter-finals and semi-finals were held at various venues in England and the final was played at the Tower Circus in Blackpool, England from 16 to 24 February 1951.

For the fifth consecutive year, the final was contested by Fred Davis and Walter Donaldson. Davis won his third world title by defeating defending champion Donaldson by 58 frames to 39 in the final after achieving a winning margin at 49–39. Donaldson made the highest break of the tournament with 106 in frame 32 of his semi-final match against Horace Lindrum.

After defeating Sidney Smith — runner-up in the 1938 and 1939 championships — in the quarter-finals, John Pulman reached the semi-finals, where he played against the eventual winner Fred Davis, before he retired and gave Davis an early bye into the final.

== Background ==
The World Snooker Championship is a professional tournament and the official world championship of the game of snooker. The sport was developed in the late 19th century by British Army soldiers stationed in India. Professional English billiards player and billiard hall manager Joe Davis noticed the increasing popularity of snooker compared to billiards in the 1920s, and with Birmingham-based billiards equipment manager Bill Camkin, persuaded the Billiards Association and Control Council (BACC) to recognise an official professional snooker championship in the 1926–27 season. In 1927, the final of the first professional snooker championship was held at Camkin's Hall; Davis won the tournament by beating Tom Dennis. The annual competition was not titled the World Championship until the 1935 tournament, but the 1927 tournament is now referred to as the first World Snooker Championship. Davis had also won the title every year from 1928 to 1940, after which the tournament was not held again until 1946 due to World War II. Walter Donaldson was the defending champion, having defeated Fred Davis 51–46 in the 1950 final.

Several professional players did not participate in the 1951 Championship, including Alec Brown, Con Stanbury and two-time runner-up Willie Smith. Four-time finalist Horace Lindrum entered for the first time since 1947. There were ten entrants. Three players were included in a qualifying competition, the winner of which would join the other seven participants in the main draw.

== Schedule ==
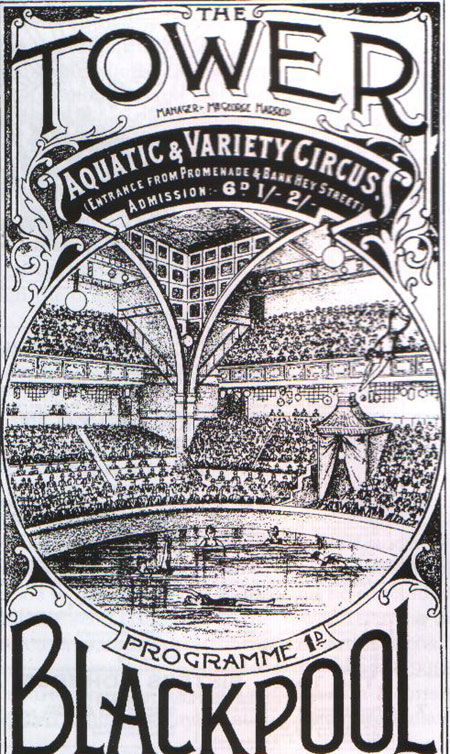
Tower Circus, Blackpool (depicted in its 1894 programme) was the venue for the final.

Schedule of matches for the 1951 World Snooker Championship
Match	Dates	Venue, city	Ref.
Horace Lindrum v Albert Brown	30 October–4 November 1950	Blue Bell Hotel, Scunthorpe	
Fred Davis v John Barrie	13–18 November 1950	Co-operative Hall, Bolton	
Walter Donaldson v Kingsley Kennerley	27 November–2 December 1950	Blue Bell Hotel, Scunthorpe	
John Pulman v Sidney Smith	11–16 December 1950	St. John's Brigade Ambulance Hall, Accrington	
Fred Davis v John Pulman	22–27 January 1951	Burroughes Hall, London	
Walter Donaldson v Horace Lindrum	22–27 January 1951	Burroughes and Watts Hall, Newcastle upon Tyne	
Fred Davis v Walter Donaldson	16–17, 19–24 February 1951	Tower Circus, Blackpool	

== Tournament summary ==
=== Quarter-finals ===
The quarter-finals were played over 71 frames. Horace Lindrum established a 9–3 lead against Albert Brown on the first day of their match. He extended his lead to 18–6 on day two. Brown took five of the six frames in the first session on day three, and Lindrum took the following session by that same margin, to lead 24–12. By winning nine of the 12 frames on day four, Lindrum needed only a further three frames, and confirmed his progress to the semi-finals at 36–15. The final score after dead frames was 43–28. Lindrum's highest break of the match was 91; Brown's was 89.

John Barrie, winner of the qualifying competition, had been due to be married the day before the start of his match against Fred Davis, but two days before the wedding date, postponed it until later in the year as his fiancée Joan Odlin's parents wanted to have a larger-scale ceremony than originally planned. Davis led 8–4 after the first day and 12–6 at the close of day two, but Barrie won the next two sessions 5–1 to narrow his deficit to two frames at 14–16. Davis went on to win 36–28; after dead frames, the score was 42–29. Davis's highest break of the match was 77; Barrie's was 73.

Walter Donaldson and Kingsley Kennerley played each other in the championship for the fourth successive year. Donaldson had won all three of the previous encounters. They each won three of the first six frames, but Kennerley led 7–5 after the first day. Donaldson won all six frames in the following session, and a further four of six frames in the next session, for 15–9. On day three, he won each session 5–1 to move to 25–11 ahead. He secured a win at 36–24; the score after dead frames was 41–30.

The cold conditions at the venue for the match between John Pulman and Sidney Smith, runner-up in the 1938 and 1939 championships, meant that the balls frequently skidded across the surface of the billiard table. An article in The Billiard Player magazine described the match as "dour but absorbing". Pulman was two frames behind, 11–13, after two days, but later drew level at 18–18 and established a 26–22 lead. He secured a place in the semi-finals at 36–31.

=== Semi-finals ===
The semi-finals were scheduled to be contested over 71 frames. Pulman withdrew due to influenza when trailing 14–22 against Fred Davis. A break of 80 by Davis was the highest in the frames that they played. Donaldson was 9–3 ahead of Lindrum, and maintained an eight frame lead at the end of each of the next four sessions, having compiled a break of 106 in the 32nd frame which remained the highest break of the tournament. Lindrum made three breaks over 80 in taking five of six frames in session seven, but Donaldson won three of the next five sessions and secured a winning margin at 36–25. The final score was 41–30.

=== Final ===
Walter Donaldson and Fred Davis played the final at the Tower Circus in Blackpool, over 97 frames, in front of record crowds for a World Snooker Championship match. It was the fifth consecutive year that they faced each other in the final. Davis said that, based on past experience, he expected to lose 0.5 stone (3.2 kg) of bodyweight during the match. He felt that he had an even chance of winning.

From 6–6 after the first day, Davis moved into a 12–6 lead. He achieved a winning margin at 49–39 before the match concluded at 58–39. Davis was presented with the championship trophy by BACC chairman John Bissett, and remarked that he considered the final the best of the five that he and Donaldson had contested.

Sessions of the 1951 World Snooker Championship final
Session	1	2	3	4	5	6	7	8	9	10	11	12	13	14	15	16
Frames won (Davis first)	3–3	3–3	6–0	3–3	2–4	5–1	4–2	4–2	2–4	5–1	4–2	3–3	2–4	2–4	4–2	6–0
Cumulative score	3–3	6–3	12–6	15–9	17–13	22–14	26–16	30–18	32–22	37–23	41–25	44–28	46–32	48–36	52–39	58–39

== Main draw ==
The results for the main draw are shown below. Match winners are shown in bold. Pulman withdrew from his match against Davis due to influenza.

**Quarter-finals**; 71 frames		**Semi-finals**; 71 frames		**Final**; 97 frames
**Walter Donaldson (SCO)**	**41**
Kingsley Kennerley (ENG)	30	**Walter Donaldson (SCO)**	**41**
**Horace Lindrum (AUS)**	**43**	Horace Lindrum (AUS)	30
Albert Brown (ENG)	28			Walter Donaldson (SCO)	39
**Fred Davis (ENG)**	**42**			**Fred Davis (ENG)**	**58**
John Barrie (ENG)	29	**Fred Davis (ENG)**	**22**
**John Pulman (ENG)**	**38**	John Pulman (ENG)	14
Sidney Smith (ENG)	33

== Qualifying ==
John Barrie met Sydney Lee at Burroughes Hall in London from 6 to 8 November. Barrie led 7–5 after the first day and 15–9 after two days. He made a break of 101 on the second evening. He eventually won 23–12. Barrie then met Dickie Laws on the following three days also at Burroughes Hall. Barrie took an 8–4 lead, increased to a winning 18–6 lead after two days. The final score was 27–8.

**Round 1**; 35 frames		**Round 2**; 35 frames
		Dickie Laws (ENG)	8
**John Barrie (ENG)**	**23**	**John Barrie (ENG)**	**27**
Sydney Lee (ENG)	12
