= 1949/1950 News of the World Snooker Tournament =

News of the World Tournament
Tournament information
- Dates: 10 October 1949 – 21 January 1950
- Venue: Leicester Square Hall
- City: London
- Country: United Kingdom
- Format: Non-Ranking event
- Total prize fund: £1500
- Winner's share: £500

Final
- Champion: (England) Joe Davis
- Runner-up: (England) Sidney Smith

The 1949/1950 News of the World Snooker Tournament was a professional snooker tournament sponsored by the News of the World. The tournament was won by Joe Davis with Sidney Smith finishing in second place. It was the first News of the World Tournament, a tournament that ran until 1959.

== Format ==
The 1949/1950 event was a round-robin snooker tournament and was played from 10 October 1949 to 21 January 1950. All matches were played at Leicester Square Hall in London. There were 8 competitors and a total of 28 matches. The competitors were Joe Davis, Walter Donaldson, George Chenier, Horace Lindrum, Sidney Smith, Peter Mans and Albert Brown. Each match lasted three days and was the best of 37 frames. There was a qualifying competition prior to the main event. This involved 4 players in a round-robin tournament with the winner, Albert Brown, advancing to the main event. 1949 World Snooker Champion Fred Davis did not enter as he objected to the matches being over only three days rather than the normal six.

Each player was given a handicap at the start of the tournament. The handicaps were: Davis: -7, Donaldson: 0, Chenier, Lindrum and Smith: 13, Pulman: 14, Mans: 16 and Brown: 19. The player with the higher handicap received a start in each frame, being the difference between the two handicaps. Thus Brown received a 3-point start in his match against Mans.

== Results ==
The two top-seeded players met in the first match. Joe Davis beat Walter Donaldson, won a tough match; taking a winning 19–16 lead in the final session. In the second match Albert Brown, receiving a 26-point start each frame, led Joe Davis 18–6 after two days and won comfortably.

Going into his last match Albert Brown seemed the likely winner of the tournament. He and Joe Davis had won 5 matches out of 6 but Brown had an 8 frame lead. This meant that if Brown won his last match 19–18, Davis would need to win his last match 28–9 to win the event. However Brown lost his last match, against Horace Lindrum, which meant that Davis only needed to win his match against George Chenier to win the tournament. In the next match Sidney Smith won 26–11, overtaking Brown in the standings and meaning that Smith would win the tournament if Davis lost. Davis took a 19–4 lead against Chenier to guarantee the £500 first prize with Smith in second place and Brown third.

Joe Davis scored the first century of the tournament on 8 November in his match against John Pulman. Pulman potted a red before Davis cleared the table with a break of 130. Davis scored a break of exactly 100 against Sidney Smith on 3 January. George Chenier scored a break of 107 on 19 January in his match against Davis.

Winner	Score	Loser	Dates
Joe Davis	19–18	Walter Donaldson	10–12 October
Albert Brown	25–12	Joe Davis	13–15 October
Albert Brown	22–15	Peter Mans	17–19 October
Peter Mans	23–14	George Chenier	20–22 October
Sidney Smith	27–10	George Chenier	24–26 October
Sidney Smith	21–16	Horace Lindrum	27–29 October
Walter Donaldson	19–18	Peter Mans	31 October–2 November
Walter Donaldson	20–17	John Pulman	3–5 November
Joe Davis	22–15	John Pulman	7–9 November
Albert Brown	22–15	George Chenier	10–12 November
Albert Brown	20–17	Walter Donaldson	14–16 November
Sidney Smith	19–18	Peter Mans	17–19 November
George Chenier	24–13	John Pulman	21–23 November
John Pulman	19–18	Albert Brown	24–26 November
Joe Davis	25–12	Horace Lindrum	28–30 November
Horace Lindrum	21–16	John Pulman	1–3 December
Albert Brown	20–17	Sidney Smith	5–7 December
George Chenier	25–12	Walter Donaldson	8–10 December
Horace Lindrum	19–18	Walter Donaldson	12–14 December
Joe Davis	21–16	Peter Mans	15–17 December
Horace Lindrum	24–13	George Chenier	26–28 December
Peter Mans	19–18	Horace Lindrum	29–31 December
Joe Davis	20–17	Sidney Smith	2–4 January
Sidney Smith	20–17	John Pulman	5–7 January
John Pulman	23–14	Peter Mans	9–11 January
Horace Lindrum	20–17	Albert Brown	12–14 January
Sidney Smith	26–11	Walter Donaldson	16–18 January
Joe Davis	25–12	George Chenier	19–21 January

Table

Pos	Player	Pld	MW	FW	Prize
1	(England) Joe Davis	7	6	144	£500
2	(England) Sidney Smith	7	5	147	£300
3	(England) Albert Brown	7	5	144	£200
4	(Australia) Horace Lindrum	7	4	130	£150
5	(South Africa) Peter Mans	7	2	123	£100
6	(England) John Pulman	7	2	120	£75
7	(Scotland) Walter Donaldson	7	2	115	£75
8	(Canada) George Chenier	7	2	113	£50

The positions were determined firstly by the number of matches won (MW) and, in the event of a tie, the number of frames won (FW). Albert Brown won an additional £50 for winning the qualifying competition.

== Qualifying ==
The qualifying tournament was played from 19 September to 8 October 1949. These matches were also played at Leicester Square Hall in London. As in the main event, each match lasted three days and was the best of 37 frames. Albert Brown and Alec Brown each won their first two matches which meant that the final match, between the two, would decide the winner. Albert Brown won a close match 20–17. Alec had led 13–11 at the start of the final day. Conrad Stanbury conceded his match against John Barrie because of illness. Barrie was leading 8–4 at the time. Barrie played a two-day exhibition match against Peter Mans instead.

Winner	Score	Loser	Dates
Albert Brown	22–15	John Barrie	19–21 September
Alec Brown	20–17	John Barrie	22–24 September
Alec Brown	24–13	Conrad Stanbury	26–28 September
Albert Brown	25–12	Conrad Stanbury	29 September–1 October
John Barrie	w/o–w/d	Conrad Stanbury	3–5 October
Albert Brown	20–17	Alec Brown	6–8 October
