= Dickie Laws =

English snooker player

Dickie Laws was an English professional snooker player, who competed in the World Snooker Championship in 1939, 1950 and 1951.

== Biography ==
Herbert W. "Dickie" Laws was born c. 1912. He became a "house man", playing snooker matches for money for various clubs, mainly for the Adelphi Club based under the Dominion Cinema in London. He defeated Tom Newman on level terms in a match for £1,000, and, receiving a start of 14 points per frame, won 3–2 against Horace Lindrum in 1937. He also had victories against Conrad Stanbury and Alec Brown in matches at the Adelphi Club. At the time, anyone who earned money from playing, or association with, snooker or English billiards was regarded as a professional. However, the governing body for the sports, the Billiards Association and Control Council (BACC), twice refused Laws's applications to enter the professional World Snooker Championship, before admitting him to the competition in 1939.

In the qualifying event for the main draw of the 1939 World Championship, he defeated Stanley Newman 19–12. The correspondent for The Times wrote that Laws "showed quite clearly that he is a first-rate winning-hazard striker with a very useful knowledge of the finer points of the game." In the qualifying final, he lost 13–18 to Walter Donaldson. In his next appearance in the Championship qualifying competition, in 1950, he lost 9–26 to Herbert Holt, whilst suffering the effects of having dislocated his shoulder in a road traffic accident. In the 1951 qualifying competition, he led 4–3 against John Barrie, but then lost the next 13 frames. Barrie had a decisive 18–6 lead in their 35 frame match after two days, and ended the match 27–8 ahead.

There was a rift between the BACC and the Professional Billiard Players' Association (PBPA), which led to each organisation staging their own championship in 1952. Laws applied to join the PBPA, but claimed he was refused on the basis that at the age of 39 he was too old to join. He next competed, in 1967, as an amateur, when he reached the final of the London section of the English Amateur Championship. He twice won the London section in later years, and took the Hammersmith and District snooker league title six times from the late 1960s to the early 1970s, also winning the district's leagues' billiards title several times.

With John Pike, he reached the final of the British Pairs snooker championship in 1977, where they lost 3–0 to Clive Everton and Roger Bales. In 1978 Laws and Pike reached the final again, defeating Terry Griffiths and John Parker 3–0 in the semi-final before losing 1–3 to Don Reed and Dave Martin. He drew 1–1 with Steve Davis in a regional tournament when Davis was 18.
