= 1939 World Snooker Championship =

Tournament information
- Dates: 23 January – 4 March 1939
- Venue: Thurston's Hall
- City: London
- Country: England
- Organisation: BACC
- Highest break: Fred Davis (ENG) (113)

Final
- Champion: Joe Davis (ENG)
- Runner-up: Sidney Smith (ENG)
- Score: 43–30

The 1939 World Snooker Championship was a snooker tournament held at Thurston's Hall in London, England from 23 January to 4 March 1939. It was the thirteenth edition of the World Snooker Championship. Joe Davis retained the championship title that he had held since 1927. In the best-of-73-frames final against Sidney Smith, Davis won the match 43–30, securing the victory at 37-25 earlier in the match. Fred Davis set a new championship highest break by compiling a 113 in the 22nd frame of his 14–17 semi-final defeat by his brother Joe Davis.

There were fifteen participants, with four players taking part in a qualifying competition for a place in the twelve-person main event. Walter Donaldson, who entered the championship for the first time since his debut in 1933, won the qualifying event, and eliminated Claude Falkiner, a tournament debutant who was taking part in his first cue sports tournament for several years, in the first round of the main draw, before losing in the quarter-finals to Sidney Smith.

== Background ==
The World Snooker Championship is a professional tournament and the official world championship of the game of snooker. The sport was developed in the late 19th century by British Army soldiers stationed in India. Professional English billiards player and billiard hall manager Joe Davis noticed the increasing popularity of snooker compared to billiards in the 1920s, and with Birmingham-based billiards equipment manager Bill Camkin, persuaded the Billiards Association and Control Council (BACC) to recognise an official professional snooker championship in the 1926–27 season. In 1927, the final of the first professional snooker championship was held at Camkin's Hall; Davis won the tournament by beating Tom Dennis in the final. The annual competition was not titled the World Championship until the 1935 tournament, but the 1927 tournament is now referred to as the first World Snooker Championship. Davis had also won the title every year from 1928 to 1938.

For the 1939 Championship, the BACC announced a closing date for entries of 31 October 1938, and that the main competition would be played at Thurston's Hall. Players would be responsible for organising the qualifying matches themselves, with the first-drawn player drawn for the match being preferred to make the arrangements. All matches except the final were to be played over 31 frames, with the final consisting of 73 frames.

There were 15 entries for the Championship. The number of players places in the competition proper was increased from 8 to 12, with four selected players competing in the qualifying competition. The main event was held over a six-week period from 23 January to 4 March at Thurston's Hall. Qualifying matches had to be completed by 14 January. On 21 January, the 1938/1939 Daily Mail Gold Cup, which was won by Alec Brown, concluded. A preview of the World Championship in The Times suggested that despite the improvement in the standard of play of younger competitor such as Brown and Sidney Smith, Davis was likely to retain the title he had held since the tournament's inception in 1927.

=== Schedule ===
Schedule of matches for the 1939 World Snooker Championship
Match	Dates	Venue, city	Ref.
Sidney Smith v Sydney Lee	23–25 January 1939	Thurston's Hall, London	
Walter Donaldson v Claude Falkiner	26–28 January 1939	Thurston's Hall, London	
Tom Newman v Alec Mann	30 January–1 February 1939	Thurston's Hall, London	
Fred Davis v Conrad Stanbury	2–4 February 1939	Thurston's Hall, London	
Alec Brown v Horace Lindrum	6–8 February 1939	Thurston's Hall, London	
Sidney Smith v Walter Donaldson	9–11 February 1939	Thurston's Hall, London	
Fred Davis v Tom Newman	13–15 February 1939	Thurston's Hall, London	
Joe Davis v Willie Smith	16–18 February 1939	Thurston's Hall, London	
Sidney Smith v Alec Brown	20–22 February 1939	Thurston's Hall, London	
Joe Davis v Fred Davis	23–25 February 1939	Thurston's Hall, London	
Joe Davis v Sidney Smith	27 February–4 March 1939	Thurston's Hall, London	

== Summary ==
=== First round ===
The first match was between Sidney Smith and Sydney Lee from 23 to 25 January. Smith had a 4–1 lead after the first session, and 6–4 at the end of the first day. The next day, Smith claimed four of the five frames in the afternoon session so was 10–5 ahead. After the fourth session, his advantage was 13–7 and, by winning the first three frames on the final day, he achieved decisive 16–7 lead. The final score after dead frames was 21–10.

From 26 to 28 January, qualifier Walter Donaldson played Claude Falkiner. Falkiner took three of the five frames in the first session, and Donaldson won three frames from five in the evening, leaving the score was level at 5–5 after the first day. Donaldson won four of the five frames in both of the sessions on the second day to lead 13–7. On the final day Donaldson took a 16–8 winning lead and ended 21–10 ahead. Falkiner had been runner-up in the professional billiards championship in 1920 and 1922. Playing Donaldson was his first competitive cue sports match in several years, and his first participation in the World Snooker Championship. The correspondent for The Times, whilst describing Donaldson as "a player of considerable skill", felt that Falkiner's lack of recent match experience contributed to his defeat.

The second week started with a match between Tom Newman and Alec Mann, which was held from 30 January to 1 February. Newman led 4–1 following the initial session, and 6–4 after the first day, and increased his lead 13–7 after two days. Newman compiled a 71 break in the opening frame of the final day before a kick ruined his chance of a century break. Newman gained a winning 16–10 lead by taking the first frame of the evening session and finished 19–12 ahead.

Fred Davis and Conrad Stanbury met in the last first round match, which started on 2 February. Davis won the first six frames and led 13–7 at the start of the final day, 4 February. Davis took a winning 16–9 lead and eventually won 19–12 after dead frames.

=== Quarter-finals ===
Daily Mail Gold Cup winner Alec Brown met Horace Lindrum in the first quarter-final, from 6 to 8 February. He had beaten Lindrum 46–25 in the Gold Cup tournament, but had received a 21-point start in each frame. Brown took a 6–4 lead, winning each of the first two sessions 3–2. On the second day, Brown compiled a break of 83, his highest-ever in competitive play, in the 13th frame. He led 10–5 at the close of the session, and 13–7 at the end of the day. Brown added the last frame on the final afternoon to secure a win at 16–9. Lindrum won five of the evening frames to give a final score of 17–14.

From 9 to 11 February, Sidney Smith played Donaldson in the second quarter-final. By taking three frames in each of the first two sessions, Smith established a 6–4 lead, extending this to 9–6 after winning the third session, again by a single frame. In the fourth session, Donaldson then won three frames in a row to equalise at 9–9, and added a fourth successive frame to lead 10–9. Smith took the last frame of the session and the second day concluded with the pair level at 10–10. Donaldson led 13–12, after the fifth session. In the concluding session, after Smith won the 26th frame to draw level, Donaldson moved a frame ahead again at 14–13. Smith made a 77 break in the 28th frame to make it 14–14, then added the next frame. Donaldson equalised at 15–15. In the deciding frame, Smith led 43–34 with one red ball left and, taking the red and then a blue and the colours to the pink, won the frame 69–34 and the match 16–15.

The next match was between Fred Davis and Newman, and was played from 13 to 15 February. Davis had won the first six frames in his opening match and on this occasion he won the first seven frames. From 8–2 up after the first two sessions, Davis won the first six frames on the second day to lead 14–2 then led 15–5 overnight, just one frame from victory. Davis won the second frame on the final day to secure victory at 16–6. The final score was 21–10 after dead frames. A match report in The Times referred to Davis as "a sound and steady rather than a brilliant player".

Joe Davis played his first match of the 1939 Championship in the last quarter-final, against Willie Smith, from 16 to 18 February. Davis took a 6–4 lead on the first day after taking three frames from five in both sessions. Smith then won the first four frames of the second day to lead 8–6, but Davis claimed the final six frames for a 12–8 overnight advantage and, by winning the first four frames of the final day, secured a decisive 16–8 lead. During the dead frames, Davis extended his run to 11 frames before Smith won four of the six evening frames to give a final score of 19–12.

=== Semi-finals ===
The first semi-final was between Sidney Smith and Brown, from 20 to 22 February. Brown took a 5–1 lead and led 6–4 overnight. Smith then won the first seven frames on the second day to take an 11–6 lead; the second day ended with the score at 12–8. Smith continued to dominate on the final day winning the match 16–9 by winning the last frame of the afternoon session. The final score was 20–11.

From 23 to 25 February, brothers Joe and Fred Davis played each other in the second semi-final. Fred won the first three frames, and led 3–2 after the first session, but Joe led 6–4 overnight. Fred regained the lead on the second afternoon but Joe took four of the evening frames and finished the day 11–9 ahead. Joe won the first frame on the second day but Fred then made a 113 clearance in the 22nd frame. Fred's break, a new record for the World Championship, included 12 reds, 6 blacks, 3 pinks, 2 blues, a brown and then all the colours. Fred won the next frame but Joe then took the following four frames and achieved victory at 16–11. The final score after dead frame was 17–14.

=== Final ===
Joe Davis met Sidney Smith in the final for the second successive year. The final took place from 27 February to 4 March, and was extended from the 61 frames in the previous championship to 73 frames, 6 frames being played per session. Davis won the first five frames and ended the day 8–4 ahead. He extended the lead to 15–9 and 20–10 before Smith won all six frames on the third evening to reduce Davis's lead to 20–16. The fourth afternoon session was shared but Davis won five frames in the evening to lead 28–20. Davis made breaks of 73, 64, 69 and 95 in the first seven frames on the fifth day, and ended the day 35–25 ahead, two frames from victory. Davis took the first two frames on the final day to win the match 37–25. The remaining 11 frames were played leaving a final score of 43–30. Davis was presented with the championship trophy by author Compton Mackenzie.

It was the thirteenth consecutive world championship won by Davis, a feat that the Birmingham Post's correspondent wrote "proved again .. that he has no equal as a snooker player". Snooker historian Clive Everton called Davis's semi-final win over his brother "the strongest challenge [Joe Davis] had yet encountered" in the history of the tournament".

== Main draw ==
Match results are shown below. Winning players and scores are denoted in bold text.

**Round 1**; 31 frames
**Fred Davis (ENG)**	**19**
Conrad Stanbury (CAN)	12
**Tom Newman (ENG)**	**19**
Alec Mann (ENG)	12
**Sidney Smith (ENG)**	**21**
Sydney Lee (ENG)	10
Claude Falkiner (ENG)	10
**Walter Donaldson (SCO)**	**21**

**Quarter-finals**; 31 frames
**Joe Davis (ENG)**	**19**
Willie Smith (ENG)	12
**Fred Davis (ENG)**	**20**
Tom Newman (ENG)	11
**Sidney Smith (ENG)**	**16**
Walter Donaldson (SCO)	15
**Alec Brown (ENG)**	**17**
Horace Lindrum (AUS)	14

**Semi-finals**; 31 frames
(England) **Joe Davis**	**17**
(England) Fred Davis	14
(England) **Sidney Smith**	**20**
(England) Alec Brown	11

**Final**; 73 frames
(England) **Joe Davis**	**43**
(England) Sidney Smith	30

=== Final ===
Final: 73 frames. Thurston's Hall, London, England, 27 February–4 March.
**Joe Davis**; England	**43**–30	Sidney Smith; England
Day 1: **89**–23, **64**–52, **77**–23, **66**–59, **68**–58, 17–**102**, **60**–28, 38–**90**, 46–**70**, **71**–27, 35–**77**, **67**–56; Day 2: **88**–46, **99**–17 (**56**), **79**–40, 52–**61**, 35–**89**, **72**–25, **77**–37, 53–**63**, 54–**64**, **113**–11 (**88**), **88**–25, 56–**66**; Day 3: **79**–45, **82**–21, **78**–37, **76**–52, 44–**86**, **72**–41 (**57**), 50–**60**, 16–**98**, 42–**76**, 41–**61**, 43–**80**, 22–**111** (**57**); Day 4: **57**–49, 61–**63**, **80**–42, 36–**72**, **62**–55, 24–**87**, **65**–60, **87**–18 (**61**), **83**–32, **74**–37, **95**–25 (**62**), 26–**99**; Day 5: **87**–32 (**73**), **104**–24 (**64**), 15–**105**, 59–**71**, **97**–33, **117**–13 (**69**), **120**–6 (**95**), 33–**71**, 49–**71**, **111**–7, **60**–50, 60–**63**; Day 6: **47**–46, **66**–40, **74**–58, 48–**70**, 29–**66**, 45–**62**, **73**–38, **75**–41, **99**–10, 39–**87** (**73**), **70**–48, 31–**63**, **56**–51
Davis won the match at 37–25. Dead frames were played.

== Qualifying Tournament ==
Walter Donaldson, who had last entered the tournament on his debut in 1933 World Snooker Championship, met Herbert Holt in the first qualifying match at the Lion Hotel, Blackpool from 8–10 December 1938. Holt led 11–9 after two days but only won two frames on the final day, Donaldson taking a winning 16–13 lead and finishing 18–13 ahead. The match between Dickie Laws and Stanley Newman was played at Thurston's Hall. The match was played on 28, 30 and 31 December 1938, there being a charity event organised for the 29th. The match was level at 5–5 after the first day but Laws led 13–7 after the second day. Newman reduced Laws lead to 14–12 on the final day but Laws won the remaining frames to take a winning 16–12 lead with a final score of 19–12. The final of the qualifying event was played in Liverpool on 11–13 January. Laws took a 6–4 lead but Donaldson won eight frames on the second day to lead 12–8. Donaldson extended his lead to 15–10 after the final afternoon session and, by winning the second frame of the evening session, took a winning 16–11 lead. The final score was 18–13.

Round 1; 31 frames
Walter Donaldson (SCO)	18
Herbert Holt (ENG)	13
Dickie Laws (ENG)	19
Stanley Newman (ENG)	12

Final; 31 frames
Walter Donaldson (SCO)	18
Dickie Laws (ENG)	13

== Century breaks ==
- 113 – Fred Davis
