= Peter Mans =

South African snooker player

Personal information
- Born: 1915
- Died: September 1975 (aged 59–60)

Sport
- Country: South Africa
- Sport: Snooker

Peter Mans (1915 – September 1975) was a South African professional snooker player. He was the first South African Professional Champion and held title, which was contested on a challenge basis, from 1948 to 1950. Professional and coach Jack Karnehm, in a 1981 book, called Mans "South Africa's outstanding player of the past" and stated that he had won 13 national-level titles from 1939 to 1952.

Horace Lindrum played Mans in South Africa in 1947, and suggested that he make a playing tour of Australia. Mans arrived in Sydney in September 1947, planning to spend the next year and a half touring Australia and New Zealand. At the time, he held the South African record for the highest break, having made one of 104.

Mans later travelled to England and participated in the eight-player 1949/1950 News of the World Snooker Tournament, for which he was seeded 7th; he finished 5th. At the 1950 World Snooker Championship he lost 32–36 to George Chenier; the score was 34–37 after dead frame. Mans, whose highest breaks in the match were 54 and 53, had won six successive frames to recover from 26–34 to 32–34.

He played Joe Davis several times. Journalist and author Ivor Brown watched Mans playing Davis in London, and wrote that "[Mans] has a detached look when not actually concentrating on the shot; he might be musing on the eternal problems of mankind." Lindrum commented in 1959 that "Unfortunately, inconsistency of form has prevented Mans from really hitting the top ranks in world-class play." He was the owner of the St James Clubs snooker hall in Jameston and Springs, Eastern Transvaal. His son Perrie Mans, runner-up at the 1978 World Snooker Championship, learnt to play the game there.
