= Bill Withers (snooker player) =

Welsh snooker player

W. A. "Bill" Withers was a Welsh player of English billiards and snooker. He defeated Fred Davis in the preliminary match for the 1937 World Snooker Championship, and lost 1–30 to Joe Davis in the quarter-finals. In the qualifying competition for the 1950 World Snooker Championship, he played Willie Smith, and lost 7–28. Withers won the Welsh amateur billiards championship in March 1928.

== Biography ==
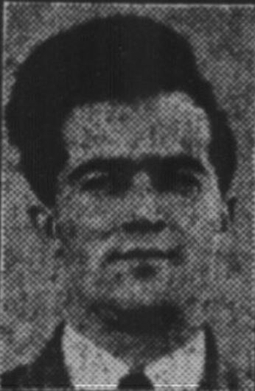
Withers c. 1928

=== Amateur career in Wales ===
Withers won Welsh Junior championships in swimming and boxing. In the early 1920s, he played for Preece's Billiard Hall in the local English billiards league. In 1923, his team won the Western Valley second division title, with 15 wins from 16 matches. Five years later, his team again won the league, and he won the Western Valley individual championship.

=== Professional career: 1928 to 1950 ===
He also won the Welsh Amateur billiards championship, in March 1928, and turned professional afterwards. In 1928, he started representing the Queen's Saloon, based in or near Hastings, East Sussex, as a professional. Back in Wales in 1929, he made a Western Valley league record break of 148, and lost 608–800 against Tom Carpenter in December. Carpenter said afterward that Withers "gave me quite a good game."

Withers was runner up to Tom Jones in the western Valley section of the Welsh Amateur billiards championship in 1931, losing 997–1,000. In 1932, chosen from amongst 274 applicants, he became the caretaker of the Penrhiwceiber Welfare Institute. He played Carpenter again in 1932, and lost their afternoon billiards game 218–962. In the evening, Withers won 620–550, and also won the two frames of snooker they played.

In 1933, Withers reportedly made a snooker break of 107 in a match at Penrhiwceiber Welfare Institute. This would have been a world record, superseding the record of 105 held by Joe Davis, if the table had been determined to meet necessary standards. Two years later, Withers played Davis at Penrhiwceiber, and, receiving 14 points start each frame, won the first two of their three scheduled frames, before Davis took the last.

1937 World Snooker Championship

The Billiards Association and Control Council introduced a qualifying competition for their World Snooker Championship for the first time in 1937 World Snooker Championship. With nine entries, Bill Withers and Fred Davis, both world championship debutants, were chosen to play a qualifying match, the winner to join the main event. Withers took a decisive 16–13 lead on the final evening, and the match ended with him 17–14 ahead. Withers then met Joe Davis, older brother of Fred, in the quarter-final match.
According to snooker historian Clive Everton, "Joe was furious at [the] affront to family honour. He berated Fred for losing". Joe Davis won the first frame, and, after trailing 0–35 in points in the second frame, produced a break of 59 and went on to take the frame. Withers made a 47 break in the third frame and was leading by 36 points with just the colours (worth 27 points) left but, by gaining 16 points in penalties, Davis managed to level the score with just the black ball left. Withers, however, doubled the black to win the frame. Davis led 9–1 at the end of the first day, after breaks of 77 in the eighth frame and 64 in the tenth frame. Davis added the five frames from the second morning session - despite Withers making a break of 58 in the thirteenth - and, with an 84 break, the first frame of the second evening. He claimed victory at 16–1 by taking the following frame. He also won the remaining 14 dead frames to finish at 30–1, having taken 28 frames in succession. Davis made breaks of 97 and 99 on the final afternoon. The five official afternoon frames having been completed quickly, the players played an exhibition frame during which Davis made a new record break of 135, beating the 133 scored by Sidney Smith during the 1936 Daily Mail Gold Cup earlier in the season.

Later career
Withers did not play at professional level again until the 1949-50 season, in which he entered qualifying for the 1950 World Snooker Championship. There, he played Willie Smith. Smith led 10–2 after the first day and took an 18–4 lead on the second day, eventually winning 28–7.

Following his heavy defeat to Smith, Withers again entered a period of inactivity; on this occasion, it was to be permanent, and the 1950 World Championship the final match of his professional career.
