= Bert Terry =

English snooker player

Personal information
- Died: 1958

Sport
- Country: England
- Sport: Snooker

Bert Terry (died 1958) was a professional snooker player who played in the 1936 World Snooker Championship.

== Biography ==
Terry entered the 1936 World Snooker Championship and was drawn against Horace Lindrum in a match over 31 frames. Members of his local club in Camberwell raised the £10 entry fee, equivalent to £611 in 2025, for him.

He won the first two frames, and the score was level at 5–5 after the first day. Lindrum won 8 frames on the second day to lead 13–7. Terry won the first frame on the final day but Lindrum won the next three to comfortably secure the match at 16–8. The match ended with Lindrum leading 20–11. An article in The Billiard Player magazine praised Terry's safety play and, although he lacked consistency at it, his potting, and commented that Terry "will always be remembered for his debut at Thurston's as one of the best ever seen at that battling venue."

He died in 1958. The article in The Billiard Player about his death referred to him as "an exceptionally good player some years before the war".
