= It Happened in Leicester Square =

1949 British film directed by Peter Collinson

- Directed by: Geoffrey J. Benstead
- Written by: Geoffrey J. Benstead
- Produced by: Norman Sharp
- Starring: Harry Tate Jr. Slim Allen; Arthur Stott
- Distributed by: Geoffrey J. Benstead Productions
- Release date: 1949
- Running time: 53 minutes
- Country: United Kingdom

It Happened in Leicester Square (also known as Hello London) is a 1949 British comedy film, written and directed by Geoffrey Benstead and starring Harry Tate Jr and Slim Allen as two men from Yorkshire who visit a billiard hall and music hall in London.

The film features appearances from a number of snooker and English billiards players.

== Cast ==
- Harry Tate Jr
- Slim Allen
- Arthur Stott
- Maisie Weldon
- Gloria Dale
- Ming Chow
- Rosemary Newton
- Charles Rayford
- Joe Davis
- Sidney Smith
- Thelma Carpenter
- Joyce Gardner
- Con Stanbury
- Herbert Holt
- Jackie Rea (as Jack Rea)
- George Gilbert and His London Orchestra

== Releases ==
The original version was 53 minutes long and was given a "U" Certificate, indicating that it was suitable for children, on 22 March 1949. The film was a commercial failure, and a re-edited version, five minutes shorter, was released in 1951 as Hello London.

== Reception ==
The Monthly Film Bulletin wrote: "The main point of interest is a visit to Leicester Square Hall to watch some specialised shots of snooker and billiards by several champions, including Joe Davis, Sidney Smith, Thelma Carpenter and Joyce Gardner – an entertaining visit for those interested in the sport. There is also a not-so-entertaining visit to a music-hall, where there are several variety turns. The humour is funny in few parts, and the script drags occasionally. Apart from sometimes jerky photography there are good shots of London, chiefly of Piccadilly and Leicester Square, and the film is painstakingly produced."

Kine Weekly wrote: "There is plenty of talent on the bill, but showmanship is lacking. Short as it is, it sags in several places. ... The programme is, to give it its due, well varied, but the best is not made of the headline snooker and billiards champions, let alone the lesser-known variety turns. The comedy link and commentary are weak. Even so, provincial audiences should fall for its title and 'stars'.'"

David Quinlan described the film as a "Mercifully brief programme-filler."

In The British 'B' Film Steve Chibnall and Brian McFarlane called it "a dull procession of variety acts."
