= Clare O'Donnell =

Canadian snooker player

Sport
- Country: Canada
- Sport: Snooker

Clare O'Donnell was a Canadian professional snooker player who played in the 1936 World Snooker Championship.

== Personal life ==
O'Donnell was born in Toronto, Canada.
