= 1937 World Snooker Championship =

Tournament information
- Dates: 22 February – 20 March 1937
- Venue: Thurston's Hall
- City: London
- Country: England
- Organisation: BACC
- Highest break: Joe Davis (ENG) (103)

Final
- Champion: Joe Davis (ENG)
- Runner-up: Horace Lindrum (AUS)
- Score: 32–29

The 1937 World Snooker Championship was a snooker tournament held at Thurston's Hall in London, England from 22 February to 20 March 1937. It is recognised as the 11th edition of the World Snooker Championship. There were nine participants in the event, with debutants Fred Davis (brother of defending champion Joe Davis) and Bill Withers competing in a qualifying match. Withers won the match to join with the remaining seven players in the main event.

Joe Davis won his 11th championship title by defeating Horace Lindrum by 32 frames to 29 in the final, despite trailing 13–17 and 19–21 during the match. The highest break of the tournament was 103, compiled by Joe Davis in the 31st frame of the final.

== Background ==
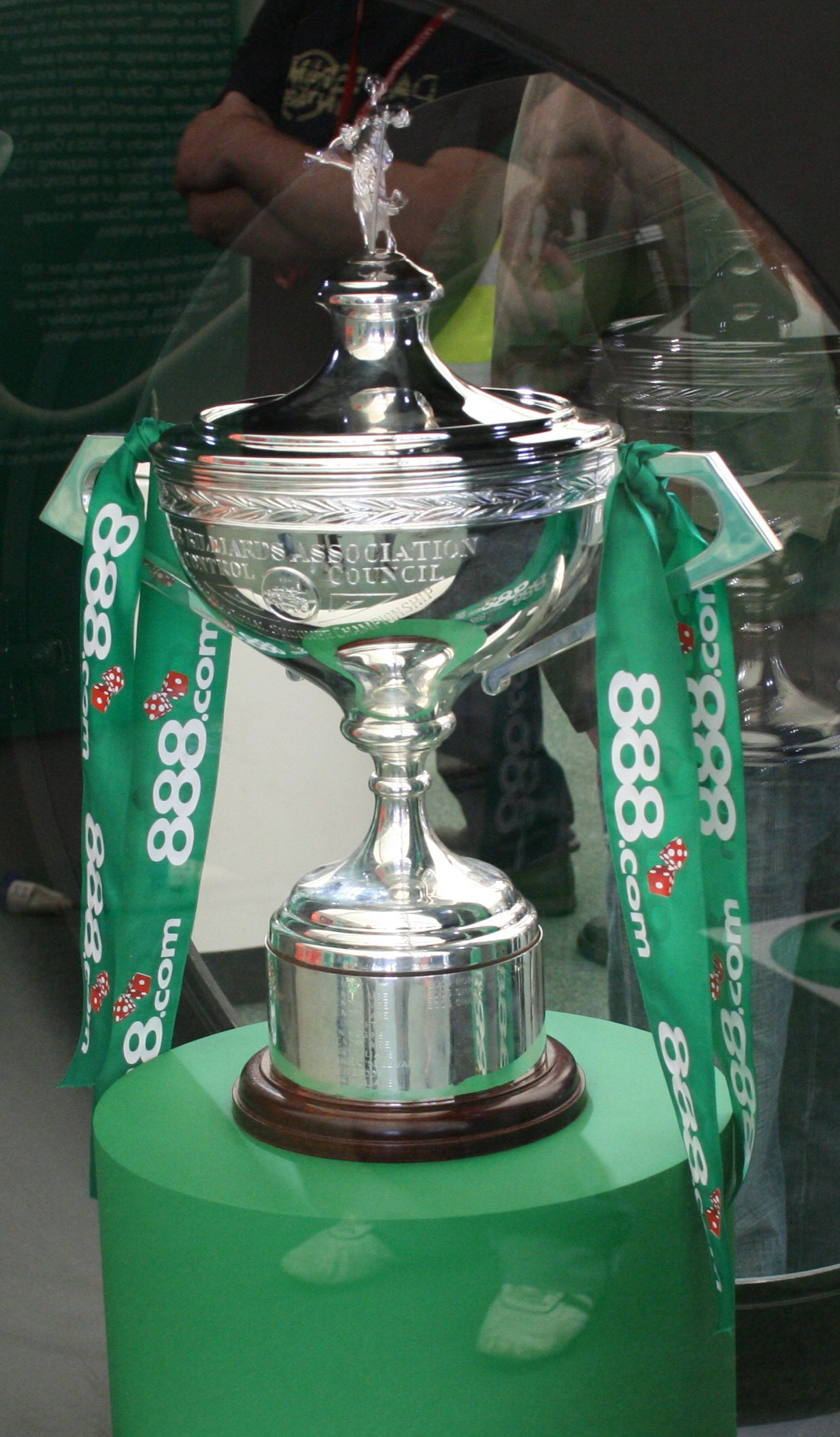
World Snooker Championship trophy

The World Snooker Championship is a professional tournament and the official world championship of the game of snooker. The sport was developed in the late 19th century by British Army soldiers stationed in India. Professional English billiards player and billiard hall manager Joe Davis noticed the increasing popularity of snooker compared to billiards in the 1920s, and with Birmingham-based billiards equipment manager Bill Camkin, persuaded the Billiards Association and Control Council (BACC) to recognise an official professional snooker championship in the 1926–27 season. In 1927, the final of the first professional snooker championship was held at Camkin's Hall; Davis won the tournament by beating Tom Dennis in the final. The annual competition was not titled the World Championship until the 1935 tournament, but the 1927 tournament is now referred to as the first World Snooker Championship. Davis had also won the title every year from 1928 to 1936.

== Summary ==
The BACC introduced a qualifying competition for the first time. If necessary, they would select players from the entrants to play in the qualifying event, the winner to advance to the competition proper. With nine entries, Bill Withers and Fred Davis were chosen to play a qualifying match, the winner to join the main event. The Championship proper was played at Thurston's Hall over a four-week period from 22 February and 20 March. All matches were played over 31 frames, except the final, which was played over 61 frames.

=== Quarter-finals ===
The first match of the competition proper took place from 22 to 24 February and was between Horace Lindrum and Sydney Lee. Lee won the first frame, but Lindrum took an 8–2 lead after the first day by winning both the afternoon and evening sessions 4–1. This was extended to 15–5 after two days, just one frame from victory, as he won three of the five afternoon frames and all but one of the five evening frames. Lindrum took the first frame on the final day to win the match 16–5. The final score was 20–11.

The second match of the first week was played by Willie Smith and Tom Newman from 25 to 27 February. Smith took a 4–1 lead from the afternoon session, but Newman was level at 5–5 after the evening's play. Newman took an 11–9 lead on the second day. On the final day Newman led 14–13 before claimed the next two frames to lead 15–14. Newman made a 57 break in the next frame to level the match. Smith won the last frame 85–23 to secure victory.

Sidney Smith faced Alec Brown in the first match of the second week, staged from 1 to 3 March. Smith won the last frame of the afternoon session to take a 3–2 lead into the evening, and added the sixth frame. Brown won frame seven on a re-spotted black, and took the following two frames for a 5–4 lead, before Smith levelled the match at 5–5 after compiling a break of 55. Smith had the best of both sessions on the second day, winning four of the five frames in each, for a 13–7 lead. The correspondent for The Times felt that Smith's safety play had been excellent, whilst Brown's potting was not up to his usual standard. Brown won three of the afternoon frames on the final day but still needed to win all six frames in the evening to win the match. Brown took the first evening frame, but Smith won the second by 87–29 to win the match 16–11. The final score was 18–13.

From 4 to 6 March, Joe Davis met Withers in the last quarter-final. Davis won the first frame, and, after trailing 0–35 in points in the second frame, produced a break of 59 and went on to take the frame. Withers made a 47 break in the third frame and was leading by 36 points with just the colours (worth 27 points) left but, by gaining 16 points in penalties, Davis managed to level the score with just the black ball left. Withers, however, doubled the black to win the frame. Davis led 9–1 at the end of the first day, after breaks of 77 in the eighth frame and 64 in the tenth frame. Davis added the five frames from the second morning session, and, with an 84 break, the first frame of the second evening. He claimed victory at 16–1 by taking the following frame. He also won the remaining 14 dead frames to finish at 30–1, having taken 28 frames in succession. Davis made breaks of 97 and 99 on the final afternoon. The five official afternoon frames having been completed quickly, the players played an exhibition frame during which Davis made a new record break of 135, beating the 133 scored by Sidney Smith during the 1936 Daily Mail Gold Cup earlier in the season. Davis's break was a total clearance during which he took the 15 reds, 8 blacks, 4 pinks, a blue, 2 browns and all the colours.

=== Semi-finals ===
Lindrum played Willie Smith in the first semi-final, from 8 to 10 March. Lindrum led 6–4 after the first day, and extended his lead to 14–6 after two days. In the 17th frame, Smith potted the final black, but then touched the cue ball before it had stopped moving, and was called for a foul that lost him the frame. Although Smith won the first two frames on the final day, Lindrum won the next frame to lead 15–8. In the following frame, Smith led 57–9 but Lindrum made a 50 clearance to win the frame 59–57 and the match 16–8. Lindrum finished the match 20–11 ahead.

In the second semi-final, played from 11 to 13 March, Joe Davis trailed 2–3 after the first session, but led 6–4 against Sidney Smith after the first day. Smith had the best of the second day to level the match at 10–10. Davis took a narrow lead after the final afternoon session, taking the last frame to lead 13–12. In the evening Davis won the first three frames to secure the match 16–12, the final score being 18–13 after dead frames.

=== Final ===
The final between Joe Davis and Lindrum, from 15 to 20 March, was a repeat of the previous year's final. The 1937 referee was Charles Chambers. Davis recorded breaks of 38 and 50 in winning the first frame, and a 53 when taking the third frame to lead 2–1. Lindrum compiled an 81 break in the next frame to level the match, before Davis claimed the fifth frame for a 3–2 lead after the first session. In the evening, Lindrum equalised at 5–5, having registered a 75 break in frame eight. On the second day, Lindrum won the eleventh frame after clearing the colours and then potting the re-spotted black, and finished the afternoon session 11–9 up. He extended this to 17–13 at the half-way stage, making an 80 break in the 21st frame. The fourth day started with a break of 103, which was the highest of the tournament, by Davis in frame 31. Davis fouled on his first visit to the table and, after a break of 29 by Lindrum, Davis cleared the table on his second visit. Two frames later, he constructed a break of 93, and by the end of the day, had reduced his deficit to 19–21. He then won eight of ten frames on the fifth day to lead 27–23. After the final afternoon session Davis still led 29–26, with Lindrum needing to win five of the six evening frames. Lindrum won the first two frames, but Davis claimed the following two frames to win the match at 31–28. The last two frames were shared to give a final result of 32–29.

Lindrum later wrote that "years later I am still pondering the loss of that 1937 crown." He felt that he was in good form during the match, and reflected that "It didn't seem possible but when play began at night, frame after frame slipped slowly from my grasp." Billiards and Snooker magazine's commentary on the tournament stated that the standard of play was higher than in any of the preceding championships. Praising Joe Davis, the article suggested that "It may be doubted if any game was so completely, so perfectly interpreted as is snooker by Davis."

== Main draw ==
Schedule of matches for the 1937 World Snooker Championship
Match	Dates	Venue, city	Ref.
Horace Lindrum v Sydney Lee	22–24 February 1937	Thurston's Hall, London	
Willie Smith v Tom Newman	25–27 February 1937	Thurston's Hall, London	
Sidney Smith v Alec Brown	1–3 March 1937	Thurston's Hall, London	
Joe Davis v Bill Withers	4–6 March 1937	Thurston's Hall, London	
Horace Lindrum v Willie Smith	8–10 March 1937	Thurston's Hall, London	
Joe Davis v Alec Brown	11–13 March 1937	Thurston's Hall, London	
Joe Davis v Horace Lindrum	15–20 March 1937	Thurston's Hall, London	

The results for the tournament are shown below. Match winners are denoted in bold.

**Quarter-finals**; 31 frames		**Semi-finals**; 31 frames		**Final**; 61 frames
**Joe Davis (ENG)**	**30**
Bill Withers (WAL)	1	(England) **Joe Davis**	**18**
**Sidney Smith (ENG)**	**18**	(England) Sidney Smith	13
Alec Brown (ENG)	13			(England) **Joe Davis**	**32**
**Horace Lindrum (AUS)**	**20**			(Australia) Horace Lindrum	29
Sydney Lee (ENG)	11	(Australia) **Horace Lindrum**	**20**
**Willie Smith (ENG)**	**16**	(England) Willie Smith	11
Tom Newman (ENG)	15

=== Final ===
Final: 61 frames. Thurston's Hall, London, England, 15–20 March 1937.
**Joe Davis**; England	**32**–29	Horace Lindrum; Australia
Day 1: **109**–12 (**50**), 21–**81**, **76**–45 (**53**), 30–**95** (**81**), **73**–21, 42–**78**, **70**–49, 22–**89** (**75**), 44–**50**, **83**–37; Day 2: 58–**65**, 24–**89**, **95**–25, 37–**88** (**70**), **72**–37, 36–**80** (**56**), **98**–22, 40–**82** (**73**), 30–**80** (**55**), **79**–53; Day 3: 16–**114** (**80**), 19–**74**, **93**–37 (**51**), 14–**105** (**56**), **78**–15, 66–**70**, 45–**54**, **58**–50, 13–**107**, **66**–19; Day 4: **103**–33 (**103**), **98**–23 (**66**), 21–**104** (**93**), **92**–36, **110**–23, **82**–46, 29–**95** (**58**), 56–**92**, **128**–0, 34–**51**; Day 5: **59**–46, **56**–33, **68**–61, **92**–3, 8–**80** (**56**), **120**–1, **71**–56, **81**–34, **107**–15 (**93**), 46–**83**; Day 6: **66**–52, 44–**73**, **66**–55, 25–**78**, 24–**101** (**58**), 27–**61**, 63–**65** (**Lindrum 53**), **63**–42, **72**–41, 38–**83**, **87**–27 (**62**)
Davis had won the match 31–28 before dead frames were played.

== Qualifying ==
Withers and Fred Davis played at Thurston's Hall from 7 to 9 January. It was the championship debut for both players. Joe Davis was playing Tom Newman in a 71-frame handicap match on the same days which meant that the Withers and Fred Davis match was played earlier in the day than usual with two sessions at 11:30 am and 5:15 pm. Withers took a decisive 16–13 lead on the final evening, and the match ended with him 17–14 ahead.

Round 1; 31 frames
Bill Withers (WAL)	17
Fred Davis (ENG)	14

== Century breaks ==
The 103 break by Horace Lindrum was the first century break in the final of the World Snooker Championship.

- 103 – Horace Lindrum
