= 1938 World Snooker Championship =

Tournament information
- Dates: 14 March – 9 April 1938
- Venue: Thurston's Hall
- City: London
- Country: England
- Organisation: BACC
- Highest break: Joe Davis (ENG) (104)

Final
- Champion: Joe Davis (ENG)
- Runner-up: Sidney Smith (ENG)
- Score: 37–24

The 1938 World Snooker Championship was a snooker tournament held from 14 March to 9 April 1938 at Thurston's Hall in London, England. It was the twelfth edition of the World Snooker Championship. Joe Davis won his twelfth championship title by defeating Sidney Smith by 37 frames to 24 in the final, after securing a winning margin at 31–23. The highest break of the tournament was 104, compiled by Davis in the sixth frame of his semi-final match against Willie Smith. It was the only century break during the event.

There were ten entrants to the competition, three of whom took part in a qualification event from which Fred Davis emerged to join the other seven players in the main draw. Horace Lindrum, the runner-up in 1936 and 1937 did not participate, due to his disagreement with Billiards Association and Control Council the over the competition terms, including about the type of cloth that would be used on the playing tables.

== Background ==
The World Snooker Championship is a professional tournament and the official world championship of the game of snooker. The sport was developed in the late 19th century by British Army soldiers stationed in India. Professional English billiards player and billiard hall manager Joe Davis noticed the increasing popularity of snooker compared to billiards in the 1920s, and with Birmingham-based billiards equipment manager Bill Camkin, persuaded the Billiards Association and Control Council (BACC) to recognise an official professional snooker championship in the 1926–27 season. In 1927, the final of the first professional snooker championship was held at Camkin's Hall; Davis won the tournament by beating Tom Dennis in the final. The annual competition was not titled the World Championship until the 1935 tournament, but the 1927 tournament is now referred to as the first World Snooker Championship. Davis had also won the title every year from 1928 to 1937.

There were ten entrants. Horace Lindrum, the losing finalist in 1936 and 1937, did not enter for 1938, because he objected to certain conditions, particularly to the cloth used. Fred Davis, Herbert Holt and Charles Read were chosen to play in a qualifying event, the winner to join the other seven players in the main event. Holt and Read were drawn against each other for the opportunity to face Davis for a place in the competition proper. The main event was held from 14 March to 22 April at Thurston's Hall, with the final over 61 frames and all other matches over 31 frames. The entry fees of 5 guineas per player were to be used as prize money for the finalists, with the winner receiving 60%.

== Summary ==
=== Quarter-finals ===
The first match in the competition proper was held from 14 to 16 March, with defending champion Joe Davis playing Sydney Lee. Davis led 7–3 after the first day, making a 93 break in frame 10. Davis won the match by winning the final frame on the second day, taking a 16–4 lead. Davis had made a 98 break in frame 16. The final score was 24–7. The correspondent for Billiards and Snooker magazine wrote that the quality of Davis's play was far ahead of his contemporaries, and that in the match "his winning-hazard striking and his positional play were a revelation even for him."

Starting on 17 March, Willie Smith met Tom Newman in the second match. The score was level at 5–5 after the first day and 10–10 after two days. Smith led 13–12 after the final afternoon session and, winning three of the first four evening frames, took the match 16–13. Newman won the two dead frames so finished at 15–16 at the conclusion on 19 March. The match was dominated by tactical play, with few high breaks. A 63 break by Newman was the highest of the match.

Qualifier Fred Davis was drawn against Alec Brown in the third match, which started on 22 March. Davis won the first four frames, and led 7–3 after the first day and 14–6 after two days. Brown, experiencing neuritis in his arm and shoulder, then conceded the match.

The last quarter-final, from 24 to 26 March, saw Sidney Smith face Conrad Stanbury. Smith lost the first three frames, but then won the next seven, for a four-frame lead after day one. Smith then claimed all 10 frames on the second day, having taken a decisive 16–3 lead. He extended his winning streak to 22 frames before Stanbury won frame 26. The final score was 27–4, with Smith making a break of 95 in frame 31.

=== Semi-finals ===
The first semi-final, from 28 to 30 March, was between Joe Davis and Willie Smith. Smith won the first frame despite trailing 65–30 with just the colours, representing only 27 available points, left. Davis went in-off three times, thus conceding penalty points, and Smith took the frame 69–65. This success was short-lived as Davis took the remaining four frames in the afternoon session. In the evening Davis cleared the table with a 104 break in frame 6 and then had a 96 break in frame 7. Smith took frame 8 but Davis led 8–2 after the first day. Davis increased his lead to 11–4 on the second afternoon. Smith made a 91 break in frame 15, going in-off trying to pot the final black ball. With four more frames in the evening, Davis led 15–5, so was just one frame from victory. He claimed the opening frame of the final day to gain a winning 16–5 lead. The final score was 24–7. Davis's break of 104 was the highest of the tournament.

Sidney Smith and Fred Davis contested the second semi-final, which took place from 31 March to 2 April. Smith secured four of the five frames in the first session, and led 7–3 after the first day. The first frame of day two had been in progress for fifteen minutes before a ball was potted, and was won by Davis. Smith took the following three frames, and Davis compiled a break of 47 in winning the fifteenth frame, leaving him five behind at 5–10. Smith increased his lead by a further frame in the fourth session, finishing 13–7 ahead at the end of the day, having made a 97 break in frame 19. On the final day Davis won three of the afternoon frames but Smith took the first frame in the evening to secure victory at 16–10. The final score was 18–13.

=== Final ===
Joe Davis and Sidney Smith met in the final, played over 61 frames from 4 to 9 April. Davis led 6–4 after the first day, winning each of the first two sessions 3–2. The correspondent for The Times remarked that the standard of play in the evening session was "below the usual standard and the breaks were small." He increased his lead to 9–6 after the next session, and 12–8 after two days. Smith took four of the five frames in the fifth session, leaving him one frame behind at 12–13, and levelled the match by winning the first frame of the sixth session, but Davis again led over-night with the score at 16–14. Davis dominated on the fourth day and led 23–17 by the close. Davis compiled a 93 break in frame 34. Davis won the last four frames on the fifth day to lead 30–20, just one frame from victory. Smith won the first three frames on the final day but Davis had a 98 clearance in frame 54 to ensure victory at 31–23. Smith won the next before Davis won the six evening frames to finish 37–24 ahead.

It was Davis's twelfth consecutive world snooker championship title. The author of the report in The Times following his victory suggested that Smith had established that he was the third-best player, behind Davis and Lindrum, but that based on the final, "there was no question regarding the superiority of the holder of the championship." Davis and Lindrum arranged a match over 133 frames, starting on 11 April, to be played at Thurston's. The match was handicapped, with Davis, conceding 10 points each frame to Lindrum. Davis won that series 71–62, after Lindrum had been only two frames behind when the score was 61–59.

== Schedule ==
Schedule of matches for the 1938 World Snooker Championship
Match	Dates
Joe Davis v Sydney Lee	14–16 March 1938
Willie Smith v Tom Newman	17–19 March 1938
Fred Davis v Alec Brown	21–23 March 1938
Sidney Smith v Conrad Stanbury	24–26 March 1938
Joe Davis v Willie Smith	28–30 March 1938
Sidney Smith v Fred Davis	31 March–2 April 1938
Joe Davis v Sidney Smith	4–9 April 1938

== Main draw ==
Match results are shown below. Winning players and scores are denoted in bold text.

**Quarter-finals**; 31 frames		**Semi-finals**; 31 frames		**Final**; 61 frames
**Joe Davis (ENG)**	**24**
Sydney Lee (ENG)	7	(England) **Joe Davis**	**24**
**Willie Smith (ENG)**	**16**	(England) Willie Smith	7
Tom Newman (ENG)	15			(England) **Joe Davis**	**37**
Alec Brown (ENG)	w/d			(England) Sidney Smith	24
**Fred Davis (ENG)**	**w/o**	(England) Fred Davis	13
**Sidney Smith (ENG)**	**27**	(England) **Sidney Smith**	**18**
Conrad Stanbury (CAN)	4

== Final ==
Final: 61 frames. Thurston's Hall, London, England, 4–9 April 1938.
**Joe Davis**; England	**37**–24	Sidney Smith; England
Day 1: **69**–33, **93**–32, 44–**68**, 39–**69**, **60**–46, 38–**67**, **73**–38, **79**–39, 29–**73**, **89**–31; Day 2: **57**–48, 24–**92**, **67**–30, 24–**76**, **50**–28, 23–**73**, 20–**68**, **112**–21, **69**–43 (**69**), **79**–57; Day 3: 57–**69** (Davis 55), 25–**87**, 66–**80**, **91**–30 (**67**), 20–**99**, 37–**50**, **72**–46, **66**–49, **69**–22, 55–**62**; Day 4: **75**–53, **89**–39, **77**–29, **114**–15 (**93**), 15–**99** (**68**), **101**–35 (**61**), 36–**81**, 50–**63**, **86**–32, **89**–34 (**57**); Day 5: 42–**70**, 46–**67**, **87**–25, **58**–53, **98**–17 (**56**), 54–**80**, **61**–50, **100**–33 (**77**), **88**–48, **58**–51; Day 6: 31–**85**, 39–**55**, 24–**95**, **105**–21 (**98**), 50–**73** (**55**), **72**–30, **80**–47, **110**–8 (**54**), **81**–44, **61**–48, **71**–33
Davis had won the match at 31–23. Dead frames were played.

== Qualifying Tournament ==
The two matches were played at Thurston's Hall immediately before the competition proper. Two players described as "unknowns" by Willie Smith played in the first match from 7 to 9 March; Herbert Holt from Blackpool and Charles Read from Salisbury. Read took an early 4–1 lead but Holt dominated thereafter, winning 16–10, the final score being 21–10. From 10 to 12 March, Holt then played Fred Davis to determine the winner of the qualifying event. Davis proved too strong for Holt, leading 9–1 after the first day and taking a winning 16–2 lead on the second day. The final score was 23–8.

**Round 1**; 31 frames		**Final**; 31 frames
		(England) **Fred Davis**	**23**
**Herbert Holt (ENG)**	**21**	(England) Herbert Holt	8
Charles Read (ENG)	10

== Century breaks ==
- 104 – Joe Davis
