= Championship Snooker =

Canadian television series

- Presented by: Bill Walker
- Narrated by: George Chenier (1966); Gordon Jones (1967)
- Country of origin: Canada
- Original language: English
- No. of seasons: 2

Production
- Producers: Claude Baikie (1966); Rick Rice (1967)

Original release
- Network: CBC Television
- Release: 7 May 1966 – 16 September 1967

Championship Snooker is a Canadian television series which aired on CBC Television from 1966 to 1967.

== Premise ==
Each episode featured snooker games between two players, recorded in Toronto at the House of Champions and edited for the hour-long time slot.

Don Maybee and Bob Trodd were the competitors in the debut episode.

== Scheduling ==
The series was broadcast on Saturday afternoons. The first series featured a 26-week tournament, broadcast between 7 May and 26 November 1966. The second season was broadcast from 13 May to 16 September 1967,
