= 1950 World Snooker Championship =

Tournament information
- Dates: 12 December 1949 – 18 March 1950
- Final venue: Tower Circus
- Final city: Blackpool
- Country: England
- Organisation: Billiards Association and Control Council
- Highest break: Fred Davis (ENG), 101

Final
- Champion: Walter Donaldson (SCO)
- Runner-up: Fred Davis (ENG)
- Score: 51‍–‍46

The 1950 World Snooker Championship was a professional snooker tournament held from 12 December 1949 to 18 March 1950. The final was staged at the Tower Circus in Blackpool, England. A qualifying competition was held at the Temperance Billiards Hall, known as the "Guild Hall", in Battersea, London from 17 October to 12 November 1949. Kingsley Kennerley won the qualifying competition and joined seven other players in the main draw.

For the fourth year running the final was contested by Fred Davis and Walter Donaldson. Donaldson defeated Davis 51‍–‍46 to win his second and last world title. Donaldson achieved a winning margin at 49‍–‍42 with only 6 frames to play. The highest break of the tournament was 101 by Davis in frame 46 of his semi-final match against George Chenier. Chenier also made a century break, 100, in his quarter-final defeat of Peter Mans.

== Background ==
The World Snooker Championship is a professional tournament and the official world championship of the game of snooker. The sport was developed in the late 19th century by British Army soldiers stationed in India. Professional English billiards player and billiard hall manager Joe Davis noticed the increasing popularity of snooker compared to billiards in the 1920s, and with Birmingham-based billiards equipment manager Bill Camkin, persuaded the Billiards Association and Control Council (BACC) to recognise an official professional snooker championship in the 1926‍–‍27 season. In 1927, the final of the first professional snooker championship was held at Camkin's Hall; Davis won the tournament by beating Tom Dennis in the final. The annual competition was not titled the World Championship until the 1935 tournament, but the 1927 tournament is now referred to as the first World Snooker Championship. Davis had also won the title every year from 1928 to 1940, after which the tournament was not held again until 1946 due to World War II. Fred Davis was the defending champion, having defeated Walter Donaldson 80‍–‍65 in the 1949 final.

The closing date for entries for the 1950 edition was originally 1 August 1949. However, about half of the leading players, including Horace Lindrum, refused to enter because of the BACC's stipulation that each player in a match should provide a stake of 20 guineas, with the stakes awarded to the match winner. It was reported later that month that only four players – defending champion Fred Davis, Donaldson, Jim Lees and Sydney Lee – had entered; on 10 August, the BACC decided to reduce the stake fee to 10 guineas (with an entry fee of 3 guineas) and extend the closing date for entries to 1 September. BACC member Henry Markland was quoted as saying that the reason for the increase to 20 guineas had been "to discourage the entry of low-grade professionals who are, frankly, out of their class in the championship." Donaldson's withdrawal from the tournament was reported on 30 August; a BACC meeting on that day decided to remove the stake fee entirely, for the first time since the championship was established in 1927, and further extend the closing date for entries until 7 September. Donaldson said that as the Professional Billiard Players' Association demands had been met, he would now be participating. Lindrum's manager T.B. Leng said that Lindrum would honour alternative bookings made rather than compete in the championship. Sidney Smith's entry was not accepted by the BACC.

=== Prize fund ===
The Sunday Empire News, which had sponsored a professional tournament in 1948, provided a prize fund:

- Final: £300 for the winner, £80 for the highest break
- Semi-finals: £100 for the winners, £50 for the highest break in each match
- Quarter-finals: £50 for the winners, £30 for the highest break in each match

== Main stage matches ==
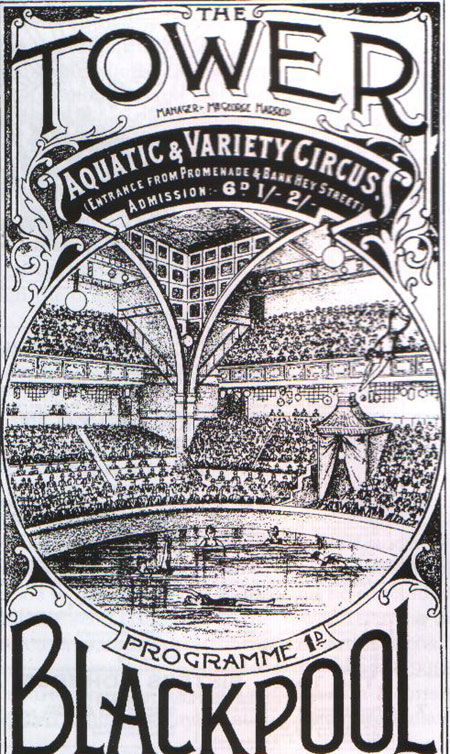
Tower Circus, Blackpool (depicted in its 1894 programme) was the venue for the final.

Matches were played over several days, with and afternoon and evening session each day, normally of six frames each.

List of matches for the 1950 World Snooker Championship
| Match | Dates | Venue, city | Ref. |
|---|---|---|---|
| Albert Brown v John Pulman | 12‍–‍17 December 1949 | Market Tavern, Bradford | |
| George Chenier v Peter Mans | 2‍–‍7 January 1950 | Bluebell Hotel, Scunthorpe | |
| Walter Donaldson v Kingsley Kennerley | 9‍–‍14 January 1950 | Co-operative Hall, Bolton | |
| Fred Davis v Alec Brown | 16‍–‍21 January 1950 | Accrington | |
| Walter Donaldson v Albert Brown | 6‍–‍11 February 1950 | Burroughes and Watts Hall, Newcastle | |
| Fred Davis v George Chenier | 6‍–‍11 February 1950 | Town Hall, Oldham | |
| Fred Davis v Walter Donaldson | 10‍–‍11, 13‍–‍18 March 1950 | Tower Circus, Blackpool | |

== Tournament summary ==
=== Quarter-finals ===
The quarter-final matches were played across 71 frames. John Pulman led Albert Brown 9‍–‍3 after the first day, but saw his lead reduced to two frames, at 13‍–‍11, after day two. On the third day, Brown took eight of the 12 frames played, to lead 19‍–‍17, and the fourth day saw him dominate play to establish a ten-frame lead. In the next three sessions, Pulman took 14 of 18 frames to level the match at 33‍–‍33. After Brown had won the 67th frame, Pulman levelled at 34-all, but Brown took the next two frames for a decisive lead of 36‍–‍34, and added the dead frame for a final total of 37‍–‍34. Brown recorded the highest break of the match, 88.

Canadian George Chenier and South African Peter Mans refused to play at Scunthorpe unless they received an acceptable financial guarantee; they agreed to the BACC's offer of £150. Chenier built a four-frame lead on the first day and maintained this advantage at the close of day two. By the close of the fourth day, Chenier was 29‍–‍19 ahead. Mans closed the gap to eight frames on day five, and followed this by taking all six frames in the afternoon session on the final day, leaving him two frames behind at 32‍–‍34. Chenier won the first two frames of the concluding session to confirm his progression to the next round at 36‍–‍32; the final score after dead frames was 37‍–‍34. Chenier's break of 100 on day two was the highest of the match.

Walter Donaldson's six-frame lead against Kingsley Kennerley following their first day's play was narrowed to four frames, at 14‍–‍10, after day two. The pair each won six frames on day three, but Donaldson moved into a twelve-frame lead, 30‍–‍18, by the end of day four. Kennerley reduced his deficit to ten frames during the fifth day, but Donaldson won the first frame on the final day to establish a decisive margin at 36‍–‍25. After dead frames, the final score was 42‍–‍29. The highest break of the match was 77 by Kennerley.

Fred Davis was 15‍–‍9 up on Alec Brown after two days, the pair having finished the first day level at 6‍–‍6. Davis won ten of the twelve frames on day four for 32‍–‍16. He secured his passage to the final by winning the first frame of the evening session on the fifth day, at 36‍–‍17; the final score after dead frames was 44‍–‍27. A 92 break by Davis was the highest of the match.

=== Semi-finals ===
In the semi-finals, matches were over 71 frames. Davis won all six frames in the first session against Chenier. By the end of the second day, Davis was 16‍–‍8 ahead, and with the players each winning six frames on both the third and fourth days, Davis was still eight frames ahead at 28‍–‍20 at the start of day five. After the first session of the fifth day the difference was still eight frames, but Davis won five of six frames on the later session to secure a winning margin at 36‍–‍24. Davis added seven of the ten dead frames on the concluding day to finish 43‍–‍28 up. The highest break of the match was 101 by Davis, in frame 46, on the fourth day.

The match report in The Billiard Player magazine described the match between Donaldson and Brown as "a palpitating struggle [that] included a great deal of dour and tense play". The players were level at 9‍–‍9, 12‍–‍12 and 18‍–‍18, but Brown led 26‍–‍22 after taking five of the six frames of the second session on the fourth day. Donaldson won the first five frames on day five, and the players were level again at 27‍–‍27. Going into the last day, Brown led 31‍–‍29. Donaldson took the first three frames of the afternoon session, which ended with the players all-square again, 33‍–‍33. The 67th frame was won by Brown, but Donaldson took the next three frames to establish a decisive lead at 36‍–‍34. With the dead frame also going to Donaldson, the final score was 37‍–‍34. Brown made the highest break of the match, 87.

=== Final ===
The final was played over 97 frames. Davis led 8‍–‍4 after the first day, but after two more days Donaldson levelled the match at 18‍–‍18, including winning five of the last six that day. He took a four-frame lead the following day, and maintained it for several days, eventually extending it to six frames at 45‍–‍39 on the penultimate day. Donaldson's victory was confirmed on the last day when the score was 49‍–‍32, with the match ending at 51‍–‍46. One session of the match was watched by almost 3,000 spectators. It was Donaldson's second and last world championship title.

The Billiard Player magazine attributed Donaldson's success to his strong safety play and a below-par performance from Davis. The highest break Donaldson achieved during the match was 80, with Davis's highest break 79. A reporter for the Manchester Evening News commented about the final that, "So afraid were Fred Davis and Walter Donaldson ... of making any rash move which would cost them a frame that play was painfully slow at times."

== Main draw ==
Quarter-finals; 71 frames
Fred Davis (ENG) | 44
Alec Brown (ENG) | 27
George Chenier (CAN) | 37
Peter Mans (SAF) | 34
Walter Donaldson (SCO) | 42
Kingsley Kennerley (ENG) | 29
John Pulman (ENG) | 34
Albert Brown (ENG) | 37

Semi-finals; 71 frames
Fred Davis (ENG) | 43
George Chenier (CAN) | 28
Walter Donaldson (SCO) | 37
Albert Brown (ENG) | 34

Final; 97 frames
Fred Davis (ENG) | 46
Walter Donaldson (SCO) | 51

== Qualifying ==
The qualifying contest was held at the Temperance Billiards Hall, known as the "Guild Hall", an 18-table hall in Battersea, London from 17 October to 12 November 1949. Kingsley Kennerley met John Barrie in the first match. Kennerley won the first five frames and led 15‍–‍9 after two days. He won the first three frames on the final day to take a winning 18‍–‍9 lead, eventually winning 21‍–‍14. The winner of the match was due to play Jim Lees in the qualifying quarter-finals, but Lees withdrew.

Willie Smith met Bill Withers in the second match of the week. Willie Smith led 10‍–‍2 after the first day and took an 18‍–‍4 lead on the second day. The final score was 28‍–‍7. After a 3-day break Sydney Lee met Conrad Stanbury. Lee led 15‍–‍9 after two days and won 20‍–‍15. Herbert Holt met Dickie Laws in the last quarter-final match. Holt led 17‍–‍7 after two days and eventually won 26‍–‍9. Kennerley met Willie Smith in the first semi-final and led 16‍–‍8 after two days. Kennerley won 22‍–‍13. Sydney Lee and Herbert Holt met in the second semi-final. Lee led 7‍–‍5 after the first day and 16‍–‍8 after the second day. Holt then got influenza and conceded the match. Kennerley met Lee in the final. Lee took a 4‍–‍2 lead but Kennerley led 7–5 overnight. Kennerley then extended his lead to 14‍–‍10, and won 21‍–‍14.

Round 1; 35 frames
John Barrie (ENG) | 14
Kingsley Kennerley (ENG) | 21

Round 2; 35 frames
Sydney Lee (ENG) | 20
Conrad Stanbury (CAN) | 15
Herbert Holt (ENG) | 26
Dickie Laws (ENG) | 9
Willie Smith (ENG) | 28
Bill Withers (WAL) | 7
Jim Lees (ENG) | w/d
Kingsley Kennerley (ENG) | w/o

Round 3; 35 frames
Sydney Lee (ENG) | w/o
Herbert Holt (ENG) | w/d
Willie Smith (ENG) | 13
Kingsley Kennerley (ENG) | 22

Final; 35 frames
Sydney Lee (ENG) | 14
Kingsley Kennerley (ENG) | 21
