= George Chenier =

Canadian snooker player (1907–1970)

Personal information
- Born: 14 January 1907 Hull, Quebec, Canada
- Died: 16 November 1970 (aged 63) Toronto, Ontario, Canada

Sport
- Country: Canada
- Sport: Snooker
- Professional: 1949–1950

George Chenier (January 14, 1907 – November 11, 1970) was a Canadian snooker player widely regarded as one of the best players Canada has ever produced. Chenier is considered to be one of the premier break builders of his era, who was also the North American Amateur Champion from 1948 to 1970 and is one of only two snooker players to have been inducted into Canada's Sports Hall of Fame, the other being Cliff Thorburn.

== Career ==
Born in Hull, Quebec, he began playing snooker as a youngster in Ottawa, and lived in various cities around North America including Detroit, Montreal, Vancouver and Toronto where he spent most of his time, explaining it was where "the best players are". He is noted for being the first world-class snooker player to use a two-piece cue.

Chenier was invited to England in 1950 by the 15 time World Snooker Champion Joe Davis. Davis had previously met Chenier went he was touring in Canada. Chenier took part in the 1950 World Snooker Championship where he reached the semi-finals before losing 43–28 to the defending champion Fred Davis. Chenier also competed in the 1949/50 News of the World Tournament. On 3 February 1950, while playing in an exhibition match against Walter Donaldson at Leicester Square Hall, Chenier made a break of 144, which was a new world record and brought a large degree of recognition for Chenier.

In the 1963 World Straight Pool Championship he ran the first perfect game of 150 and out registered in the tournament and finished 6th. Whilst in Los Angeles for the 1966 World Straight Pool Championship, Chenier suffered a stroke prior to the tournament that affected his speech and the left side of his body. That left him unable to compete for a short time. However, in spite of his failing health, he still managed to successfully defend his North American Amateur Championship in April 1970.

He was a commentator for the Canadian television series Championship Snooker which was broadcast in 1966 and 1967.

Chenier died from complications following series of strokes on November 11, 1970. The following year in 1971 he was posthumously inducted into Canada's Sports Hall of Fame.

== Career finals ==
=== Amateur finals: 23 (23 titles) ===
- North American Amateur Championship – 1948–1970
