= 1936 World Snooker Championship =

Snooker tournament

Tournament information
- Dates: 23 March – 2 May 1936
- Final venue: Thurston's Hall
- Final city: London
- Country: England
- Organisation: BACC
- Format: Single-elimination tournament
- Highest break: Horace Lindrum (AUS) (101)

Final
- Champion: Joe Davis (ENG)
- Runner-up: Horace Lindrum (AUS)
- Score: 34–27

The 1936 World Snooker Championship was a snooker tournament that was held at the Burroughes and Thurston's Halls in London, England from 23 March to 2 May 1936. There were 13 entries; a significant increase from five in the previous year and just two in 1934. Defending champion Joe Davis won the Championship for the tenth consecutive time, defeating Horace Lindrum in the final 34–27. Horace Lindrum became the first Australian to compete at the World Championship and made the only century break of the tournament, a 101 in his semi-final match against Stanley Newman.

== Overview ==
The World Snooker Championship was created in 1927 by Joe Davis and the Billiards Association and Control Council (BA&CC). The defending champion of the event was Davis, who had won the 1935 event by defeating Willie Smith 28–21 in the final. The championship was contested over several weeks in two locations, at the Thurston's Hall and Burroughes Hall in London, England. The final was played between 27 April and 2 May 1936 at Thurston's Hall. The event had 13 participants, with three players receiving a bye to the second round. Tom Dennis, who had received a bye, later withdrew. His scheduled opponent Stanley Newman's first game was in the semi-finals. Matches were played as the best-of-31 frames until the final, which was played as the best-of-61 frames. "Dead frames", after a player has already won the match were also played.

=== Schedule ===
Below was the schedule for the event.

Schedule for the event
Stage	Match	Dates	Venue, city
First round	Clare O'Donnell v Sydney Lee	23–25 March 1936	Thurston's Hall, London
First round	Horace Lindrum v Bert Terry	26–28 March 1936	Thurston's Hall, London
First round	Joe Davis v Tom Newman	30 March–1 April 1936	Thurston's Hall, London
First round	Willie Smith v Sidney Smith	2–4 April 1936	Thurston's Hall, London
First round	Conrad Stanbury v Alec Mann	6–8 April 1936	Burroughes Hall, London
Quarter-finals	Stanley Newman v Tom Dennis	6–8 April 1936	Thurston's Hall, London
Quarter-finals	Horace Lindrum v Clare O'Donnell	13–15 April 1936	Burroughes Hall, London
Quarter-finals	Joe Davis v Willie Smith	13–15 April 1936	Thurston's Hall, London
Quarter-finals	Alec Brown v Conrad Stanbury	16–18 April 1936	Thurston's Hall, London
Semi-finals	Horace Lindrum v Stanley Newman	20–22 April 1936	Thurston's Hall, London
Semi-finals	Joe Davis v Alec Brown	23–25 April 1936	Thurston's Hall, London
Final	Joe Davis v Horace Lindrum	27 April–2 May 1936	Thurston's Hall, London

== Summary ==
The Championship started on 23 March, following the 1935/1936 Daily Mail Gold Cup English billiards tournament two days earlier which has fully occupied Thurston's Hall since the beginning of the year. Sessions were extended to five frames, compared to the four frames that had been played in 1935. The first match was between Clare O'Donnell and Sydney Lee. O'Donnell led 6–4 after the first day and 11–9 after two days. Lee won the last two frames on the final afternoon to reduce O'Donnell's lead to 13–12 and then won the first three in the evening to lead 15–13 before O'Donnell won the last three frames to win the match 16–15.

Horace Lindrum met Bert Terry in the second match. The score was level at 5–5 after the first day but Lindrum won 8 frames on the second day to lead 13–7. Terry won the first frame on the final day but Lindrum won the next three to comfortably clinch the match 16–8. The match ended with Lindrum leading 20–11. Joe Davis met Tom Newman in the first match of the second week. Davis won all 10 frames on the first day and the first 6 on the second to win the match 16–0. Newman won frame 18 to end Davis's run of 17 successive frames but the match ended with Davis 29–2 ahead.

Willie Smith met Sidney Smith in the second match of the week. Sidney Smith won the first four frames and the day end with him leading 6–4. The second day was level and Sidney Smith ended the day 11–9 ahead. Willie Smith made a break of 92 in frame 18, the highest of the Championship at that stage. Sidney Smith won four of the five frames on the final afternoon to lead 15–10, needing just one frame for victory. However, Willie Smith won all six frames in the evening to win the match 16–15. Frame 30 was the closest frame on the final evening; Willie Smith winning the frame 57–54 on the final black.

Con Stanbury met Alec Mann in the final first round match at Burroughes Hall. Stanbury led 6–4 and 12–8. He then won the first four frames on the final day to win the match 16–8. The final score was 22–9. In the first of the quarter-final matches Tom Dennis had to withdraw after having an operation on his right eye. As a result, Newman received a bye to the semi-final.

After a break for Easter, Lindrum met O'Donnell at Burroughes Hall. Lindrum led 8–2 and 15–5 after the first two days. O'Donnell won frame 21 but Lindrum won the match in the next frame, winning 16–6. The afternoon session ended with Lindrum 19–6 ahead. O'Donnell did not appear for the evening session and Lindrum played an exhibition match against Bert Terry. At the same time Davis played Willie Smith at Thurston's Hall. Davis led 7–3 after the first day. He extended his lead to 10–5 and then won all five frames on the second evening to lead 15–5. Davis won the first frame on the third day to win the match 16–5, the final score being 22–9.

Brown played Stanbury in the last quarter-final match. Brown led 7–3 after the first day but Stanbury had the better of the second day and Brown's lead was reduced to 11–9 after two days. Stanbury won three frames in the afternoon and only trailed by one frame, Brown leading 13–12. Stanbury won three of the first four frames in the evening to lead 15–14 but Brown won frame 30 to level the match. In the final frame Stanbury led 45–30 with just the colours left but Brown gained points from a number of snookers and won the frame 65–45 with just the black remaining.

Lindrum met Stanley Newman in the first semi-final. Newman, the younger brother of Tom Newman, had got to this stage without playing a match. Lindrum dominated throughout, leading 9–1 and 19–1; the match finishing with the score at 29–2. Having already won the match 16–1, Lindrum made a break of 101 in frame 18, which included 13 reds, 10 blacks and 3 pinks, the only century break of the event. The second semi-final was between Davis and Brown. Brown won the first frame to great applause but Davis led 7–3 at the end of the day. He extended the lead to 14–6 after two days, needing just two frames on the final day. The match ended quickly on the third day, Davis taking the first two frames to win 16–6. The match ended with the score at 21–10.

The final was played between Lindrum and defending champion Davis. Lindrum led 6–4 and 11–9, before Davis won four out of the next five frames with top breaks of 75 and 78 to lead 13–12. However, Lindrum levelled the match at 15–15, before winning six out of ten frames to lead 21–19, and led at the conclusion of the penultimate day 26–24. He then won the first frame of the final day, before Davis won the last ten frames in a row to win 34–27, having already won the match 31–27. The popularity of the event proved that snooker had become a major game, with the Daily Mail Gold Cup switching from English billiards to snooker and The Billiard Player changing its name to Billiards and Snooker in October 1936.

== Main draw ==
Players in bold denote match winners.

**Round 1**; 31 frames
(England) **Joe Davis**	**29**
(England) Tom Newman	2
(England) **Willie Smith**	**16**
(England) Sidney Smith	15
(Canada) **Con Stanbury**	**22**
(England) Alec Mann	9
(Australia) **Horace Lindrum**	**20**
(England) Bert Terry	11
(Canada) **Clare O'Donnell**	**16**
(England) Sydney Lee	15

**Quarter-finals**; 31 frames
(England) **Joe Davis**	**22**
(England) Willie Smith	9
(Canada) Con Stanbury	15
(England) **Alec Brown**	**16**
(England) **Stanley Newman**	**w/o**
(England) Tom Dennis	w/d
(Australia) **Horace Lindrum**	**19**
(Canada) Clare O'Donnell (Note: Clare O'Donnell did not appear for the final session of the match.)	6

**Semi-finals**; 31 frames
(England) **Joe Davis**	**21**
(England) Alec Brown	10
(England) Stanley Newman	2
(Australia) **Horace Lindrum**	**29**

**Final**; 61 frames
(England) **Joe Davis**	**34**
(Australia) Horace Lindrum	27

=== Final ===
Final: best of 61 frames. Thurston's Hall, London, England, 27 April–2 May 1936.
**Joe Davis**; England	**34**–27	Horace Lindrum; Australia
Day 1: **60**–42, 44–**74**, 43–**71**, 33–**80**, **78**–21, **64**–41, 38–**70**, 47–**81**, **55**–45, 27–**79**; Day 2: 26–**79** (**52**), **74**–20, **68**–46, 55–**62**, 46–**69**, 39–**80**, **84**–38 (**70**), 28–**90**, **76**–20, **59**–35; Day 3: **113**–7 (**75**), **73**–37, **75**–42, 34–**62**, **108**–19 (**78**), 46–**52**, 49–**63**, **88**–32, 45–**66**, **57**–55; Day 4: 55–**69**, **95**–42, 37–**79**, 49–**62**, 62–**64**, 60–**63**, 45–**56**, **74**–41, **77**–27, **92**–36; Day 5: **99**–39, **88**–23, 36–**81**, 68–**71** (Davis 64), **77**–24, **62**–44, 63–**68**, **87**–23, 54–**62**, 15–**101** (**69**); Day 6: 54–**65**, **66**–53, **75**–32, **73**–42, **55**–48, **110**–5, **75**–47, **57**–47, **104**–17, **70**–50, **83**–39
"Dead" frames were played, Davis had won the match 31–27.
