= Con Stanbury =

Canadian snooker player

Conrad Stanbury
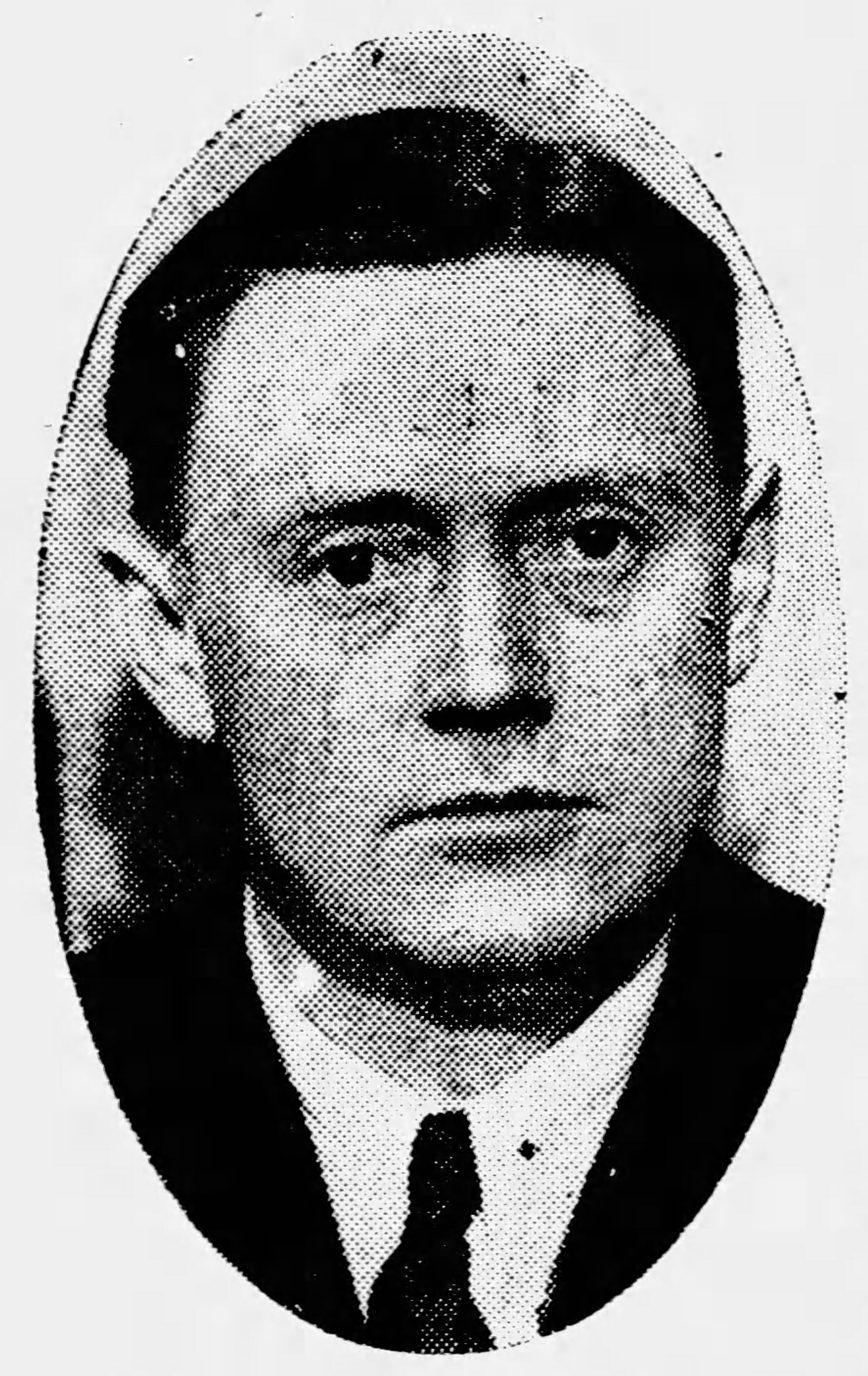
- Stanbury in 1935

Personal information
- Born: c. 1898
- Died: April 1973 (aged 75) London, England

Sport
- Country: Canada
- Sport: Snooker
- Professional: 1934–1950

Conrad Stanbury (c. 1898–April 1973) was a Canadian professional snooker player. He was the first player to make an officially-recognised century break at snooker. In 1935, he became the first player from outside the British Isles to compete in the World Snooker Championship.

== Career ==
Con Stanbury was born in about 1898. In 1922, he compiled a break of 113, recognised as the first snooker century break. He won the 1932 national snooker championship of Canada, known as the Dominion Championship, by defeating A. Corteau 10–1 in the final. A few weeks later, he defeated Tom Newman 4–3 in a challenge match.

In 1934, it was announced that funds were being raised to send Stanbury to compete in the World Snooker Championship. Newman wrote in the News of the World that he regarded Stanbury as "the most likely man I know" to defeat champion Joe Davis, and praised Stanbury's play, particularly his ability with screw shots. Stanbury travelled to England for the 1935 World Snooker Championship, and was the first player from outside the British Isles to compete in the World Championship. He lost in the deciding frame of his first match, 12–13 to Willie Smith in a quarter-final.

In the 1936 Championship he defeated Alec Mann before being eliminated by Alec Brown in the quarter-finals, and at his next attempt in 1938, lost 4–27 to Sidney Smith at the same stage. After competing in five further championships from 1939 to 1948, but winning only two matches, Stanbury won three successive matches all 18–17 in 1949, against Herbert Francis, Jackie Rea and Herbert Holt, before losing 13–58 to Walter Donaldson. His final entry to the championship was in 1950, and saw him defeated 15–20 by Sidney Lee

Whilst the British players of the time had a background in English billiards, which was played with a delicate touch, Stanbury played snooker more like pool, with powerfully hit shots. A correspondent for The Times wrote in 1939 that "it should not be forgotten that the present popularity of the game [of snooker] dates from the time he came to this country to challenge the leading players." Stanbury was a British resident for the rest of his life after emigrating in 1935, and worked as a coach at a billiard hall in London for many years. He also appeared as himself in the 1949 film It Happened in Leicester Square alongside other professional players.

Stanbury died in a hospital in London in April 1973, aged 75.

== Championships ==
- Dominion Championship – 1932
