= Charnwood Borough Council elections =

Local government elections in Leicestershire, England

Charnwood Borough Council elections are held every four years for all seats on Charnwood Borough Council, the local authority for the non-metropolitan district of Charnwood in Leicestershire, England. Since the last boundary changes in 2023 the council has comprised 52 councillors, representing 24 wards, with each ward electing one, two or three councillors.

== Election results ==
- 1973 Charnwood Borough Council election
- 1976 Charnwood Borough Council election
- 1979 Charnwood Borough Council election
- 1983 Charnwood Borough Council election (New ward boundaries)
- 1987 Charnwood Borough Council election (Borough boundary changes took place but the number of seats remained the same)
- 1991 Charnwood Borough Council election
- 1995 Charnwood Borough Council election
- 1999 Charnwood Borough Council election
- 2003 Charnwood Borough Council election (New ward boundaries)
- 2007 Charnwood Borough Council election
- 2011 Charnwood Borough Council election
- 2015 Charnwood Borough Council election
- 2019 Charnwood Borough Council election
- 2023 Charnwood Borough Council election (New ward boundaries)

== Election results ==
	Overall control	Conservative	Labour	Lib Dem (Note: Liberal in 1973, 1976, and 1979, SDP–Liberal Alliance in 1983 and 1987.)	BNP	Independent	Green
2023	NOC	23	20	-	-	1	8
2019	Conservative	37	13	-	-	1	1
2015	Conservative	41	9	1	-	1	-
2011	Conservative	33	16	1	1	1	-
2007	Conservative	32	13	5	1	1	-
2003	NOC	24	22	6	-	-	-
1999	NOC	24	21	6	-	1	-
1995	Labour	15	30	5	-	2	-
1991	Conservative	34	15	2	-	1	-
1987	Conservative	39	10	3	-	-	-
1983	Conservative	38	14	-	-	-	-
1979	Conservative	42	12	3	-	1	-
1976	Conservative	40	12	2	-	4	-
1973	NOC	29	13	5	-	11	-

A dash indicates that the results for a particular election are not available, or that a party did not stand in an election.

== Results maps ==
2003 results map

2007 results map

2011 results map

2015 results map

2019 results map

2023 results map

== By-election results ==
=== 1995-1999 ===
Sileby By-Election, 26 June 1997
Party	Candidate	Votes	%	±%
Labour		874	68.3	+1.8
Conservative		338	26.4	−7.1
Liberal Democrats		68	5.3	N/A
Majority		536	41.9	
Turnout		1,280	24.3	
Labour hold		Swing	+4.5	

=== 1999-2003 ===
Barrow Upon Soar Quordon By-Election, 28 June 2001
Party	Candidate	Votes	%	±%
Conservative		956	57.1	+4.7
Labour		462	27.6	−1.1
Liberal Democrats		257	15.3	−3.6
Majority		494	29.5	
Turnout		1,675		
Conservative hold		Swing	+2.9	

Hathern By-Election, 10 October 2002
Party	Candidate	Votes	%	±%
Labour		736	64.7	+10.6
Conservative		243	21.4	−11.1
Liberal Democrats		83	7.3	−6.2
UKIP		75	6.6	+6.6
Majority		493	43.3	
Turnout		1,137	20.2	
Labour hold		Swing	+10.9	

Sileby By-Election, 12 December 2002
Party	Candidate	Votes	%	±%
Conservative		557	53.3	+14.5
Labour		397	38.0	−13.2
UKIP		92	8.8	N/A
Majority		160	15.3	
Turnout		1,046	19.0	
Conservative gain from Labour		Swing	+13.9	

=== 2003-2007 ===
Loughborough Shelthorpe By-Election, 5 October 2006
Party	Candidate	Votes	%	±%
Labour	Neville Stork	643	38.7	−17.0
BNP	Andrew Holders	478	28.8	N/A
Conservative	James Poland	386	23.2	−21.1
Liberal Democrats	Paul Tyler	155	9.3	N/A
Majority		165	9.9	
Turnout		1,662	33.5	
Labour hold		Swing	−22.9	

Loughborough Dishley and Hathern By-Election, 23 October 2008
Party	Candidate	Votes	%	±%
Labour	Mary Newton	838	49.7	+5.0
Conservative	Robert Shields	490	29.1	−9.7
BNP	Julia Green	234	13.9	−2.6
Liberal Democrats	Diane Horn	107	6.4	N/A
National Front	Andrew Holders	16	0.9	N/A
Majority		348	20.6	
Turnout		1,685	35.5	
Labour hold		Swing	+7.4	

=== 2007-2011 ===
Birstall Watermead By-Election, 18 February 2010
Party	Candidate	Votes	%	±%
Conservative	Iain Bentley	674	47.7	+2.8
Labour	Hayley Winrow	452	32.0	N/A
BNP	Maurice Oatley	288	20.4	N/A
Majority		222	15.7	
Turnout		1,414	26.9	
Conservative hold		Swing	−17.4	

=== 2011-2015 ===
Loughborough Southfields By-Election, September 13 2012
Party	Candidate	Votes	%	±%
Conservative	Ted Parton	538	48.5	+11.3
Labour	Mary Draycott	516	46.6	−3.4
Liberal Democrats	Diana Brass	54	4.9	−7.9
Majority		22	1.9	
Turnout		1,111	18.4	−15.0
Conservative gain from Labour		Swing	+7.4	

Loughborough Hastings Ward by-election, 24 October 2013
Party	Candidate	Votes	%	±%
Labour	Sarah Dawn Maynard Smith	554	61.4	
Conservative	Judith Margaret Spence	127	14.1	
UKIP	Andy McWilliam	111	12.3	
British Democrats	Kevan Christopher Stafford	85	9.4	
Liberal Democrats	Simon Atkins	26	2.9	
Majority		427	47.28	
Turnout		903		

Shepshed West Ward by-election, 24 October 2013
Party	Candidate	Votes	%	±%
Liberal Democrats	Diane Jayne Horne			
Labour	Jane Lennie			
Conservative	Joan Tassell			
Majority				
Turnout				

Death of Conservative Cllr Stuart Jones.

Birstall Wanlip By-Election, 20 February 2014
Party	Candidate	Votes	%	±%
Liberal Democrats	Simon Sansome	508	39.4	+15.2
Conservative	Mary Allen	419	32.4	−15.0
Labour	Marilyn Cowles	355	27.5	−0.1
Majority		89	7	
Turnout		1290	24.9	
Liberal Democrats gain from Conservative		Swing	+15	

Thurmaston By-Election, 31 July 2014
Party	Candidate	Votes	%	±%
Labour	Ralph Raven	783	42.6	−4.4
UKIP	Tom Prior	496	27.0	+27.0
Conservative	Hanif Asmal	404	22.0	−31.0
British Democrats	Chris Canham	95	5.2	+5.2
BNP	Stephen Denham	58	3.2	+3.2
Majority		287	15.6	
Turnout		1,836		
Labour gain from Conservative		Swing		

=== 2015-2019 ===
Birstall Wanlip by-election, 4 May 2017
Party	Candidate	Votes	%	±%
Conservative	Roy Rollings	772	41.3	+2.2
Liberal Democrats	Simon Sansome	603	32.3	−2.2
Labour	Sanjay Gogia	425	22.7	−3.7
Independent	Norman Cutting	69	3.7	+3.7
Majority		169	9.0	
Turnout		1,869		
Conservative hold		Swing		

Loughborough Shelthorpe by-election, 3 August 2017
Party	Candidate	Votes	%	±%
Labour	Richard Huddlestone	595	45.5	+5.8
Conservative	Russell Ford	591	45.2	+0.1
Liberal Democrats	Alex Guerrero	93	7.1	+7.1
UKIP	Andy McWilliam	29	2.2	+2.2
Majority		4	0.3	
Turnout		1,308		
Labour hold		Swing		

Loughborough Hastings Ward by-election, 26 October 2017
Party	Candidate	Votes	%	±%
Labour	Colin Hamilton	676		
Labour	Mary Draycott	648		
Conservative	Jane Hunt	228		
UKIP	Simon Murray	95		
UKIP	Andy McWilliam	79		
Green	Lewis Wright	73		
Green	Mia Woolley	58		
Majority		535		
Turnout		1859	22.32%	
Labour hold		Swing		
Labour hold		Swing		

Quorn and Mountsorrel by-election, 21 June 2018
Party	Candidate	Votes	%	±%
Conservative	Jane Hunt	719	51.5	−7.7
Labour	Chris Hughes	305	21.9	−5.1
Liberal Democrats	Marianne Gilbert	232	16.6	+16.6
UKIP	Andy McWilliam	139	10.0	−3.8
Majority		414	29.7	
Turnout		1,395		
Conservative hold		Swing		

Birstall Wanlip by-election, 13 September 2018
Party	Candidate	Votes	%	±%
Conservative	Shona Rattray	492	47.1	+9.0
Labour	Abe Khayer	340	32.6	+6.2
Liberal Democrats	Carolyn Thornborrow	128	12.3	−20.0
UKIP	Norman Cutting	50	4.8	+4.8
Green	Charlotte Clancy	34	3.3	+3.3
Majority		152	14.6	
Turnout		1,044		
Conservative hold		Swing		

Anstey by-election, 20 December 2018
Party	Candidate	Votes	%	±%
Conservative	Paul Baines	523	50.8	+17.1
Labour	Glyn McAllister	507	49.2	+33.6
Majority		16	1.6	
Turnout		1,030		
Conservative gain from Liberal Democrats		Swing		

=== 2019-2023 ===
Syston West by-election, 3 October 2019
Party	Candidate	Votes	%	±%
Conservative	Sue Gerrard	406	44.7	−6.4
Green	Matthew Wise	389	42.8	+19.4
Labour	Sharon Brown	114	12.5	−13.0
Majority		17	1.9	
Turnout		909		
Conservative hold		Swing		

Shepshed West by-election, 23 September 2021
Party	Candidate	Votes	%	±%
Conservative	Ian Williams	511	43.6	+2.2
Labour	Myriam Roberts	316	26.9	+0.8
Green	John Hounsome	302	25.7	+14.3
Liberal Democrats	Katy Brookes-Duncan	44	3.8	−3.9
Majority		195	16.6	
Turnout		1,173		
Conservative hold		Swing		

Loughborough Shelthorpe by-election, 20 January 2022
Party	Candidate	Votes	%	±%
Labour	Beverley Gray	709		
Labour	Catherine Gray	654		
Conservative	Christopher Stewart	311		
Independent	David Hayes	149		
Liberal Democrats	Alejandro Guerrero	136		
Green	Rachel Baker	108		
Liberal Democrats	Emmanuel Fantaisie	104		
Green	Faye Forde	81		
Labour hold		Swing		
Labour hold		Swing		

=== 2023-2027 ===
Loughborough East by-election, 2 May 2024
Party	Candidate	Votes	%	±%
Labour	Louise Taylor-Durrant	1,489	62.1	
Green	Daisy Taylor	510	21.3	
Conservative	Pauline Ranson	398	16.6	
Majority		979	40.8	
Turnout		2,397		
Labour hold		Swing		

Sileby and Seagrave by-election, 31 October 2024
Party	Candidate	Votes	%	±%
Green	Steve Bellamy	752	52.9	
Reform	Pete Morris	297	20.9	
Conservative	Sue Gerrard	302	18.4	
Labour	Kaisra Khan	70	4.9	
Liberal Democrats	Alistair Duffy	40	2.8	
Majority		455	32.0	
Turnout		1,461		
Green hold		Swing		

Wreake Valley by-election, 17 September 2026
Party	Candidate	Votes	%	±%
Conservative	James Poland	1,091	48.2	
Reform	Michael Slade	706	31.2	
Green	Hamzah Sheikh	372	16.4	
Labour	Jay Dyas	69	3.1	
Liberal Democrats	Murray Sinclair	24	1.1	
Majority		385	17.0	
Turnout		2,262		
Conservative gain from Green		Swing		
