= 2019 Charnwood Borough Council election =

2019 UK local government election

← 2015	2 May 2019	2023 →

All 52 seats to Charnwood Borough Council 27 seats needed for a majority

	First party	Second party
Party	Conservative	Labour
Last election	41 seats, 51.5%	9 seats, 33.1%
Seats won	37	13
Seat change	▼4	▲4
Popular vote	31,912	23,938
Percentage	44.7%	33.5%
Swing	▼6.8%	▲0.4%
	Third party	Fourth party
Party	Green	Independent
Last election	0 seats, 4.8%	1 seat, 0.9%
Seats won	1	1
Seat change	▲1	Steady
Popular vote	6,113	1,258
Percentage	8.6%	1.8%
Swing	▲3.8%	▲0.9%
- Results of the 2019 Charnwood Borough Council election
Council control before election
Conservative
Council control after election
Conservative

The 2019 Charnwood Borough Council election took place on 2 May 2019 to elect members of the Charnwood Borough Council in England. This was on the same day as other local elections.

== Summary ==
2019 Charnwood Borough Council election
Party	Candidates	Seats	Gains	Losses	Net gain/loss	Seats %	Votes %	Votes	+/−
Conservative	48	37	1	5	▼4	71.2	44.7	31,912	–6.8
Labour	50	13	4	0	▲4	25.0	33.5	23,938	+0.4
Green	19	1	1	0	▲1	1.9	8.6	6,113	+3.8
Independent	3	1	0	0	Steady	1.9	1.8	1,258	+0.9
UKIP	17	0	0	0	Steady	0.0	6.1	4,369	+1.5
Liberal Democrats	14	0	0	1	▼1	0.0	4.7	3,371	+0.8
Freedom Party	1	0	0	0	Steady	0.0	0.4	299	N/A
British Democrats	1	0	0	0	Steady	0.0	0.2	121	–0.7

== Ward results ==
=== Anstey ===
Anstey
Party	Candidate	Votes	%	±%
Conservative	Deborah Taylor	871	51.0	
Conservative	Paul Baines	723	42.4	
Labour	Glyn McAllister	548	32.1	
Labour	Lee Potter	416	24.4	
UKIP	Alan Jarvis	239	14.0	
Green	Philip Mills	238	13.9	
Liberal Democrats	Rob Simpson	134	7.9	
Turnout		1,715	30.6	
Conservative hold				
Conservative gain from Liberal Democrats				

=== Barrow & Sileby ===
Barrow & Sileby
Party	Candidate	Votes	%	±%
Conservative	Hilary Fryer	818	46.9	
Conservative	Pauline Ranson	794	45.5	
Labour	Tim Clamp	417	23.9	
Green	Mia Woolley	397	22.8	
Labour	Jean Conway	277	15.9	
Liberal Democrats	Philip Thornborow	240	13.8	
UKIP	Stephen Moss	239	13.7	
Turnout		1,752	31.7	
Conservative hold				
Conservative hold				

=== Birstall Wanlip ===
Birstall Wanlip
Party	Candidate	Votes	%	±%
Conservative	Shona Rattray	804	46.5	
Conservative	Roy Rollings	734	42.5	
Labour Co-op	Julie Palmer	586	33.9	
Labour Co-op	Abe Khayer	536	31.0	
Liberal Democrats	Ian Davison	233	13.5	
UKIP	Norman Cutting	186	10.8	
Turnout		1,730	30.7	
Conservative hold				
Conservative hold				

=== Birstall Watermead ===
Birstall Watermead
Party	Candidate	Votes	%	±%
Conservative	Iain Bentley	803	51.6	
Conservative	Julian Howe	789	50.7	
Green	Emily Hodgkinson	519	33.3	
Labour	Nick Birchall	500	32.1	
Turnout		1,588	30.6	
Conservative hold				
Conservative hold				

=== East Goscote ===
East Goscote
Party	Candidate	Votes	%	±%
Green	Laurie Needham	575	59.6	
Conservative	Kevin Preston	273	28.3	
UKIP	Ian Hayes	62	6.4	
Independent	Cathy Duffy	55	5.7	
Majority				
Turnout		970	42.6	
Green gain from Conservative		Swing		

=== Forest Bradgate ===
Forest Bradgate
Party	Candidate	Votes	%	±%
Conservative	David Snartt	690	64.7	
Labour	Sue Munroe	156	14.6	
Liberal Democrats	Kate Tipton	124	11.6	
UKIP	Anthony Jarvis	97	9.1	
Majority				
Turnout		1,074	40.5	
Conservative hold		Swing		

=== Loughborough Ashby ===
Loughborough Ashby
Party	Candidate	Votes	%	±%
Labour	Julie Bradshaw	411	79.7	
Labour	Katrina Goddard	375	72.7	
Conservative	Trevor Ranson	104	20.2	
Turnout		542	12.4	
Labour hold				
Labour gain from Conservative				

=== Loughborough Dishley & Hathern ===
Loughborough Dishley & Hathern
Party	Candidate	Votes	%	±%
Labour	Keith Harris	893	50.9	
Labour	Emma Ward	844	48.1	
Conservative	Debbie Houston	636	36.3	
Conservative	Salim Miah	475	27.1	
UKIP	Howard Toon	328	18.7	
Turnout		1,769	34.9	
Labour gain from Conservative				
Labour hold				

=== Loughborough Garendon ===
Loughborough Garendon
Party	Candidate	Votes	%	±%
Independent	Roy Campsall	1,016	56.4	
Labour	Paul Boldrin	616	34.2	
Conservative	Graham Waller	576	31.9	
Labour	Christopher Price	571	31.7	
UKIP	Chris McGuirk	289	16.0	
Turnout		1,811	40.1	
Independent hold				
Labour gain from Conservative				

=== Loughborough Hastings ===
Loughborough Hastings
Party	Candidate	Votes	%	±%
Labour	Mary Draycott	807	62.0	
Labour	Colin Hamilton	696	53.4	
Conservative	Sue Gerrard	240	18.4	
Green	Sue Ward	235	18.1	
Conservative	Pam Stewart	217	16.7	
UKIP	Janet Harrod	176	13.5	
Turnout		1,304	29.0	
Labour hold				
Labour hold				

=== Loughborough Lemyngton ===
Loughborough Lemyngton
Party	Candidate	Votes	%	±%
Labour	Christine Harris	825	64.3	
Labour	Jewel Miah	817	63.7	
Conservative	William Hunt	245	19.1	
UKIP	Chris Cooper	234	18.2	
Turnout		1,297	27.4	
Labour hold				
Labour hold				

=== Loughborough Nanpantan ===
Loughborough Nanpantan
Party	Candidate	Votes	%	±%
Conservative	Margaret Smidowicz	721	55.7	
Conservative	Geoffrey Parsons	643	49.7	
Labour	Marion Smith	421	32.5	
Labour	Lewis Ashurst	331	25.6	
Green	John Barton	292	22.6	
Turnout		1,306	34.5	
Conservative hold				
Conservative hold				

=== Loughborough Outwoods ===
Loughborough Outwoods
Party	Candidate	Votes	%	±%
Conservative	Jonathan Morgan	853	44.0	
Conservative	Richard Bailey	785	40.5	
Labour	Gregory Bates-Lay	477	24.6	
Green	Paul Goodman	468	24.1	
Labour	Wesley Hall	404	20.8	
Liberal Democrats	David Walker	351	18.1	
UKIP	Jim Foxall	257	13.3	
Turnout		1,947	42.8	
Conservative hold				
Conservative hold				

=== Loughborough Shelthorpe ===
Loughborough Shelthorpe
Party	Candidate	Votes	%	±%
Labour	Gill Bolton	771	41.8	
Labour	Alice Brennan	669	36.3	
Conservative	Chris Stewart	520	28.2	
Conservative	Ian Williams	419	22.7	
Green	Rachel Baker	329	17.8	
UKIP	Martin Moreland	304	16.5	
Liberal Democrats	Alex Guerrero	217	11.8	
British Democrats	Kevan Stafford	121	6.6	
Turnout		1,853	29.3	
Labour gain from Conservative				
Labour hold				

=== Loughborough Southfields ===
Loughborough Southfields
Party	Candidate	Votes	%	±%
Conservative	Ted Parton	804	51.6	
Conservative	Paul Mercer	696	44.6	
Labour	Sarah Goode	614	39.4	
Labour	Arthur Gould	610	39.1	
Green	Melissa Hadfield	276	17.7	
Turnout		1,569	39.6	
Conservative hold				
Conservative hold				

=== Loughborough Storer ===
Loughborough Storer
Party	Candidate	Votes	%	±%
Labour	Sandra Forrest	464	56.7	
Labour	Jennifer Tillotson	410	50.1	
Green	Wesley Walton	274	33.5	
Conservative	Judith Shields	218	26.6	
Turnout		835	22.0	
Labour hold				
Labour hold				

=== Mountsorrel ===
Mountsorrel
Party	Candidate	Votes	%	±%
Conservative	Leigh Emmins	685	46.4	
Conservative	John Capleton	557	37.7	
UKIP	Steve Gunby	339	23.0	
Labour	Nigel Ball	332	22.5	
Liberal Democrats	Alistair Duffy	297	20.1	
Labour	Jacob Mann	292	19.8	
Turnout		1,496	28.2	
Conservative hold				
Conservative hold				

=== Queniborough ===
Queniborough
Party	Candidate	Votes	%	±%
Conservative	Daniel Grimley	651	65.4	
Green	Michelle Nelson	192	19.3	
Labour	Rosy Curtis	152	15.3	
Majority				
Turnout		1,017	31.3	
Conservative hold		Swing		

=== Quorn & Mountsorrel Castle ===
Quorn & Mountsorrel Castle
Party	Candidate	Votes	%	±%
Conservative	Richard Shepherd	936	44.3	
Conservative	Jane Hunt	903	42.7	
Liberal Democrats	Marianne Gilbert	428	20.2	
Liberal Democrats	Carolyn Mann	419	19.8	
Labour	Daniel Potter	392	18.5	
Labour	Chris Hughes	384	18.2	
UKIP	Andy McWilliam	292	13.8	
Independent	Ian Margetts	187	8.8	
Turnout		2,133	37.8	
Conservative hold				
Conservative hold				

=== Rothley & Thurcaston ===
Rothley & Thurcaston
Party	Candidate	Votes	%	±%
Conservative	Mark Charles	1,140	58.9	
Conservative	Leon Hadjinikolaou	987	51.0	
Green	Luke Astle	395	20.4	
Labour	Maxine Linnell	379	19.6	
Labour	Richard Thornton	283	14.6	
UKIP	Jamie Bye	281	14.5	
Turnout		1,947	32.3	
Conservative hold				
Conservative hold				

=== Shepshed East ===
Shepshed East
Party	Candidate	Votes	%	±%
Conservative	Robin Popley	634	41.7	
Conservative	John Savage	618	40.7	
Labour	Claire Poole	528	34.8	
Labour	Myriam Roberts	375	24.7	
Green	John Hounsome	316	20.8	
Liberal Democrats	Katy Brookesduncan	262	17.2	
Turnout		1,541	29.9	
Conservative hold				
Conservative hold				

=== Shepshed West ===
Shepshed West
Party	Candidate	Votes	%	±%
Conservative	Christine Radford	824	47.1	
Conservative	Joan Tassell	667	38.1	
Labour	Jane Lennie	519	29.6	
Labour	Roy Kershaw	489	27.9	
UKIP	Danny Slate	269	15.4	
Green	Benjamin Woolley	227	13.0	
Liberal Democrats	John Popley	153	8.7	
Liberal Democrats	Grantley Lycett	98	5.6	
Turnout		1,762	30.6	
Conservative hold				
Conservative hold				

=== Sileby ===
Sileby
Party	Candidate	Votes	%	±%
Conservative	Paul Murphy	632	39.9	
Conservative	Andy Paling	602	38.0	
Green	Bill Richards	412	26.0	
UKIP	George Addinall	334	21.1	
Labour Co-op	Valerice Marriott	325	20.5	
Labour Co-op	Kaisra Khan	296	18.7	
Liberal Democrats	Scott Armitage	163	10.3	
Turnout		1,591	25.9	
Conservative hold				
Conservative hold				

=== Syston East ===
Syston East
Party	Candidate	Votes	%	±%
Conservative	Simon Bradshaw	656	48.4	
Conservative	Ken Pacey	614	45.3	
Labour	Sharon Brown	418	30.9	
Green	Andrew Haynes	365	27.0	
Labour	Mike McLoughlin	290	21.4	
Turnout		1,377	25.2	
Conservative hold				
Conservative hold				

=== Syston West ===
Syston West
Party	Candidate	Votes	%	±%
Conservative	Tom Barkley	632	54.0	
Conservative	Eric Vardy	610	52.1	
Labour	Michael Smith	316	27.0	
Green	Matthew Wise	290	24.8	
Labour	James Adcock	236	20.2	
Turnout		1,200	23.9	
Conservative hold				
Conservative hold				

=== The Wolds ===
The Wolds
Party	Candidate	Votes	%	±%
Conservative	Jenny Bokor	706	60.8	
Liberal Democrats	Ian Sharpe	252	21.7	
Green	Nigel Feetham	112	9.6	
Labour	Patrick Brian	92	7.9	
Majority				
Turnout		1,179	45.8	
Conservative hold		Swing		

=== Thurmaston ===
Thurmaston
Party	Candidate	Votes	%	±%
Conservative	Brenda Seaton	1,081	45.8	
Conservative	Mark Lowe	977	41.4	
Conservative	Matthew Brookes	815	34.6	
Labour	Pete Goffin	778	33.0	
Labour	Cassandra Soulsby	769	32.6	
Labour	Lyndsey Derbyshire	728	30.9	
UKIP	Shane Durrant	443	18.8	
Freedom Party	Paul Newman	299	12.7	
Turnout		2,379	31.0	
Conservative hold				
Conservative hold				
Conservative hold				

=== Wreake Villages ===
Wreake Villages
Party	Candidate	Votes	%	±%
Conservative	James Poland	534	63.7	
Green	David Cannon	201	24.0	
Labour	Steven Brown	103	12.3	
Majority				
Turnout		856	35.5	
Conservative hold		Swing		

== By-elections ==
=== Shepshed West ===
Shepshed West: 23 September 2021
Party	Candidate	Votes	%	±%
Conservative	Ian Williams	511	43.6	+2.2
Labour	Myriam Roberts	316	26.9	+0.9
Green	John Hounsome	302	25.7	+14.4
Liberal Democrats	Katy Brookes-Duncan	44	3.8	−3.9
Majority		195	16.7	
Turnout		1,173	19.4	
Conservative hold		Swing	▲0.7	

=== Loughborough Shelthorpe ===
Loughborough Shelthorpe: 20 January 2022
Party	Candidate	Votes	%	±%
Labour	Beverley Gray	709	57.2	+15.4
Labour	Catherine Gray	654	52.7	+16.4
Conservative	Christopher Stewart	311	25.1	−3.1
Independent	David Hayes	149	12.0	N/A
Liberal Democrats	Alejandro Guerrero	136	11.0	−0.8
Green	Rachel Baker	108	8.7	−9.1
Liberal Democrats	Emmanuel Fantaisie	104	8.4	N/A
Green	Faye Forde	81	6.5	N/A
Majority		343	27.6	
Turnout		1,242	18.66	
Labour hold				
Labour hold				
