= Kelsall Prince =

English billiards and snooker player

Harry Kelsall Prince
Personal information
- Born: 26 December 1904 Nottingham, England
- Died: 1980 (aged 75) Loughborough, England

Sport
- Country: England
- Sport: Snooker

Harry Kelsall Prince (26 December 1904 – 1980) was an English professional billiards and snooker player. He played in the 1929 World Snooker Championship, losing 14–6 to Tom Dennis.

Kelsall Prince was a boy champion at billiards, playing an exhibition match at the age of just 11 in his father's public house in Nottingham. He was the son of Henry Kelsall Prince, licensee of the Greyhound Inn in Nottingham, later moving to Loughborough.

Prince entered the 1929 World Snooker Championship and was drawn to play Tom Dennis, of Nottingham, in the semi-final. The match was played in the Town Hall, Loughborough from 17 to 21 December 1928. The match was over 25 frames. There was just one session of four frames every evening. The match was close until halfway through the fourth session when Dennis led 8–6. However, he then won the next 5 frames to win the match. A win in the final frame of the evening left the score at 14–6, after five sessions. The match did not continue to the planned sixth session.
