= Loughborough Town Hall =

Municipal building in Loughborough, Leicestershire, England

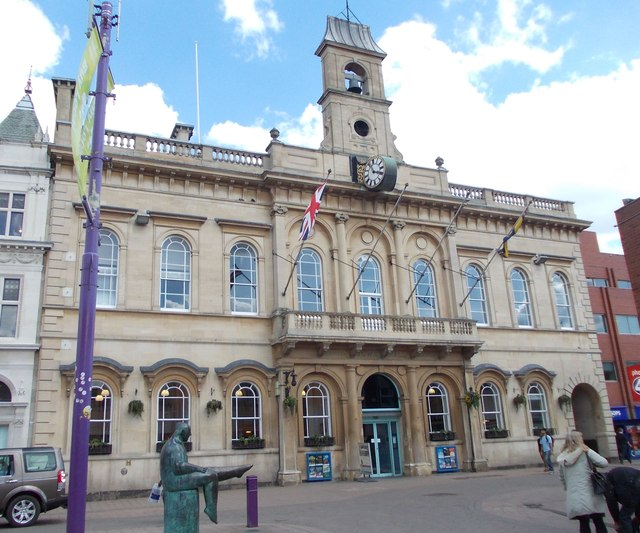
- Loughborough Town Hall

- Shown in Leicestershire
- 52.77086°N 1.20638°W
- Location: Market Place, Loughborough

History
- Built: 1855

Site notes
- Architect: William Slater
- Architectural style: Italianate style

Listed Building – Grade II
- Designated: 5 November 1984
- Reference no.: 1361164

The Loughborough Town Hall is a building fronting onto the Market Place in Loughborough, Leicestershire, England. Built as a corn exchange and ballroom in 1855, it later became a municipal building and subsequently a theatre. It is a Grade II listed building. The building is still used for full council meetings of Charnwood Borough Council.

== History ==
The origins of the building lie in the early 19th century, when four Loughborough tradesmen began a movement to provide the town with a public gathering place. It received much more momentum with the involvement of the local MP, Charles Packe of Prestwold Hall, who donated £500 towards the enterprise. With his backing, other local gentry got on board, and £8,012 was raised for the purchase of land and the construction of the building.

The foundation stone for the new building was laid by Charles Packe in October 1854: it was designed by the Northampton-born architect William Slater in the Italianate style, built in ashlar stone and was completed in 1855. The design involved a symmetrical main frontage with nine bays facing onto the Market Place; the central section of three bays, which slightly projected forward, featured a round headed doorway with a fanlight flanked by two rounded headed sash windows separated by Doric order columns supporting an entablature and a balcony. On the first floor there were round headed sash windows separated by Ionic order columns supporting an entablature and a cornice and, at roof level, there was a two-stage decorative bellcote. The outer sections on both floors were also fenestrated by round headed sash windows. The clock, which hangs from the main frontage of the building, was designed and manufactured (by G. & F. Cope of Nottingham) in 1879 and installed in 1880. The bell, which was cast by John Taylor & Co, based in Loughborough, was also installed at that time. Both were given by Edward Basil Farnham.

The primary uses in its earliest days were as a ground floor corn exchange hall, where local farmers could meet and trade. Upstairs was a ballroom for the use of the gentry. However, from the outset all manor of public gatherings and entertainments were able to make use of the premises. Until 1888 Loughborough had no town charter and was administered by the lord of the manor, and more latterly by local boards with specific responsibility for water and sanitation works, highways, schools, and burials. When Loughborough received a charter in 1888, the new council took on these roles for the town, and was in need of a suitably dignified administrative base. The Corn Exchange company agreed to sell the building and, after it had been converted into a town hall, it re-opened as a municipal building in 1890.

The suffragette, Emmeline Pankhurst, spoke at Loughborough Town Hall during the 1910 General Election.

During the Second World War the council acquired a large house called Southfields on Southfield Road, which after the war was converted to become its main offices. The town hall continued to be used as a venue for council meetings. This pattern continued following local government reorganisation in 1974, which saw the Borough of Loughborough absorbed into the larger Borough of Charnwood. Charnwood likewise has its main offices at Southfields (which was substantially extended in 1990) but holds full council meetings at Loughborough Town Hall.

The town hall was damaged during a serious fire in 1972. The building was converted into a theatre to the designs of Goodwin, Warner and Associates between 1973 and 1974. An extensive refurbishment of the building, which was undertaken by G. F. Tomlinson at a cost of £5 million, was completed in November 2004.

On 15 March 2023, a fire broke out in a branch of HSBC next to the town hall and spread to the roof of the building.
