= 2011 Charnwood Borough Council election =

2011 UK local government election

Results of the 2011 Charnwood Borough Council election

Elections to the Charnwood Borough Council took place on 5 May 2011, in line with other local elections in the United Kingdom. A total of 52 councillors were elected from 28 wards as the whole council was up for election.

The Conservatives held control of the council after winning it at the previous election with a sizeable, albeit reduced, majority of 14 seats. The Labour Party regained some of their 2007 losses in Loughborough and Shepshed whilst the Liberal Democrats lost four seats, leaving them with a sole councillor in Anstey. The British National Party only fielded three candidates and therefore lost a substantial share of their previous vote; they did, however, hold on to their one seat in East Goscote by just five votes, meaning Councillor Cathy Duffy became one of the few BNP councillors in the whole country to be re-elected.

== Results summary ==
Charnwood Borough Council election, 2011
Party	Seats	Gains	Losses	Net gain/loss	Seats %	Votes %	Votes	+/−
Conservative	33	3	2	+1	63.5	50.9	48,940	+2.3
Labour	16	3	0	+3	30.8	40.3	38,728	+12.9
Liberal Democrats	1	0	4	−4	1.9	6.3	6,040	−7.9
BNP	1	0	0	±0	1.9	1.0	959	−6.0
Independent	1	0	0	±0	1.9	0.9	879	−1.5
UKIP	0	0	0	±0	0.0	0.6	522	New

== Ward results ==
In wards that are represented by more than one councillor, electors were given more than one vote each, hence the voter turnout may not match the number of votes cast.

=== Anstey ===
Anstey (2 seats)
Party	Candidate	Votes	%	±%
Liberal Democrats	John Sutherington	1,087	28.8	
Conservative	Paul Day	989	26.2	
Conservative	Susan Witts	631	16.7	
Labour	Glyn McAllister	518	13.7	
Labour	James Bolton	335	8.9	
BNP	James Taylor	215	5.7	
Turnout		2,188	41.9	
Liberal Democrats hold		Swing		
Conservative hold		Swing		

Ward Summary
Party	Votes	% Votes	±%	Seats	Change
Conservative	1,620	42.9	−3.3	1	
Liberal Democrats	1,087	28.8	−13.4	1	
Labour	853	22.6	N/A	0	
BNP	216	5.7	−6.0	0	
Total Votes Cast	3,775				

=== Barrow and Sileby West ===
Barrow and Sileby West (2 seats)
Party	Candidate	Votes	%	±%
Conservative	Hilary Fryer	1,394	33.4	
Conservative	Pauline Ranson	1,224	29.4	
Labour	Alan Willcocks	855	20.5	
Labour	Ivor Perry	696	16.7	
Turnout		2,307	44.8	
Conservative hold		Swing		
Conservative hold		Swing		

Ward Summary
Party	Votes	% Votes	±%	Seats	Change
Conservative	2,618	62.8	+5.6	2	
Labour	1,551	37.2	+0.9	0	
Total Votes Cast	4,169				

=== Birstall Wanlip ===
Birstall Wanlip (2 seats)
Party	Candidate	Votes	%	±%
Conservative	Stuart Jones	1,102	30.6	
Conservative	Serinda Shergill	830	23.1	
Labour	Marilyn Cowles	642	17.8	
Liberal Democrats	Helena Edwards	564	15.7	
Labour	Amrat Bava	461	12.8	
Turnout		2,141	46.6	
Conservative gain from Liberal Democrats		Swing		
Conservative hold		Swing		

Ward Summary
Party	Votes	% Votes	±%	Seats	Change
Conservative	1,932	53.7	+8.0	2	+1
Labour	1,103	30.6	N/A	0	
Liberal Democrats	564	15.7	−31.4	0	−1
Total Votes Cast	3,599				

=== Birstall Watermead ===
Birstall Watermead (2 seats)
Party	Candidate	Votes	%	±%
Conservative	David Gaskell	1,060	27.9	
Conservative	Iain Bentley	976	25.7	
Labour	Rosalind Hopkins	696	18.3	
Labour	Sally Sapsford	630	16.6	
Liberal Democrats	Richard Miller	433	11.4	
Turnout		2,253	42.5	
Conservative gain from Liberal Democrats		Swing		
Conservative hold		Swing		

Ward Summary
Party	Votes	% Votes	±%	Seats	Change
Conservative	2,036	53.6	+7.0	2	+1
Labour	1,326	34.9	N/A	0	
Liberal Democrats	433	11.4	−42.0	0	−1
Total Votes Cast	3,795				

=== East Goscote ===
East Goscote (1 seat)
Party	Candidate	Votes	%	±%
BNP	Cathy Duffy	401	42.3	+5.4
Conservative	Yvonne Smith	396	41.8	+5.7
Labour	Gill McLoughlin	150	15.8	N/A
Turnout		963	43.2	
BNP hold		Swing	−0.2	

=== Forest Bradgate ===
Forest Bradgate (1 seat)
Party	Candidate	Votes	%	±%
Conservative	David Snartt	1,043	78.1	−6.3
Labour	Howard Stevenson	292	21.9	+6.3
Turnout		1,350	50.0	
Conservative hold		Swing	−6.3	

=== Loughborough Ashby ===
Loughborough Ashby (2 seats)
Party	Candidate	Votes	%	±%
Labour	Chris Carter	834	32.6	
Labour	Julie Bradshaw	817	31.9	
Conservative	David Goss	506	19.7	
Conservative	Laura Seaton	404	15.8	
Turnout		1,384	25.1	
Labour gain from Conservative		Swing		
Labour hold		Swing		

Ward Summary
Party	Votes	% Votes	±%	Seats	Change
Labour	1,651	64.5	+8.1	2	+1
Conservative	910	35.5	+4.4	0	−1
Total Votes Cast	2,561				

=== Loughborough Dishley and Hathern ===
Loughborough Dishley and Hathern (2 seats)
Party	Candidate	Votes	%	±%
Labour	Betty Newton	1,270	30.6	
Labour	Steve Smith	1,131	27.2	
Conservative	Stephen Hodgson	906	21.8	
Conservative	James Poland	850	20.4	
Turnout		2,268	46.0	
Labour hold		Swing		
Labour gain from Conservative		Swing		

Ward Summary
Party	Votes	% Votes	±%	Seats	Change
Labour	2,401	57.8	+9.2	2	+1
Conservative	1,756	42.2	+0.3	0	−1
Total Votes Cast	4,157				

=== Loughborough Garendon ===
Loughborough Garendon (2 seats)
Party	Candidate	Votes	%	±%
Labour	Max Hunt	1,150	32.7	
Independent	Roy Campsall	879	25.0	
Conservative	John Bassford	778	22.1	
Labour	Hashok Parmar	710	20.2	
Turnout		2,305	49.2	
Labour hold		Swing		
Independent hold		Swing		

Ward Summary
Party	Votes	% Votes	±%	Seats	Change
Labour	1,860	52.9	+9.9	1	
Independent	879	25.0	−14.5	1	
Conservative	778	22.1	+4.7	0	
Total Votes Cast	3,517				

=== Loughborough Hastings ===
Loughborough Hastings (2 seats)
Party	Candidate	Votes	%	±%
Labour	Anne Williams	1,163	34.5	
Labour	Jitu Choudhury	1,104	32.8	
Conservative	Judith Spence	612	18.1	
Conservative	Mohammed Shahid	492	14.6	
Turnout		1,934	41.2	
Labour hold		Swing		
Labour hold		Swing		

Ward Summary
Party	Votes	% Votes	±%	Seats	Change
Labour	2,267	67.3	+7.1	2	
Conservative	1,104	32.7	−7.1	0	
Total Votes Cast	3,371				

=== Loughborough Lemyngton ===
Loughborough Lemyngton (2 seats)
Party	Candidate	Votes	%	±%
Labour	Christine Harris	1,200	36.4	
Labour	Jewel Miah	1,106	33.6	
Conservative	Shazidur Chowdhury	406	12.3	
Conservative	Salim Miah	389	11.8	
Liberal Democrats	Michael Willis	192	5.9	
Turnout		1,841	37.7	
Labour hold		Swing		
Labour hold		Swing		

Ward Summary
Party	Votes	% Votes	±%	Seats	Change
Labour	2,306	70.0	+19.1	2	
Conservative	795	24.1	+5.7	0	
Liberal Democrats	192	5.9	−16.1	0	
Total Votes Cast	3,294				

=== Loughborough Nanpantan ===
Loughborough Nanpantan (2 seats)
Party	Candidate	Votes	%	±%
Conservative	Jane Hunt	890	25.8	
Conservative	Margaret Smidowicz	826	24.0	
Labour	Mike Cahill	713	20.7	
Labour	Ruth Sinclair	610	17.7	
Liberal Democrats	Steve Coltman	207	6.0	
Liberal Democrats	Andrew Thorpe	200	5.8	
Turnout		1,863	40.9	
Conservative hold		Swing		
Conservative hold		Swing		

Ward Summary
Party	Votes	% Votes	±%	Seats	Change
Conservative	1,716	49.8	−7.1	2	
Labour	1,323	38.4	+18.7	0	
Liberal Democrats	407	11.8	−11.7	0	
Total Votes Cast	3,446				

=== Loughborough Outwoods ===
Loughborough Outwoods (2 seats)
Party	Candidate	Votes	%	±%
Conservative	Ron Jukes	1,388	28.0	
Conservative	Jonathan Morgan	1,291	26.1	
Labour	Frank Fay	744	15.0	
Labour	Andy Clarke	720	14.6	
Liberal Democrats	David Walker	498	10.1	
Liberal Democrats	David Scott	312	6.3	
Turnout		2,501	53.7	
Conservative gain from Liberal Democrats		Swing		
Conservative hold		Swing		

Ward Summary
Party	Votes	% Votes	±%	Seats	Change
Conservative	2,679	54.1	+3.9	2	+1
Labour	1,464	29.6	N/A	0	
Liberal Democrats	810	16.4	−33.4	0	−1
Total Votes Cast	4,125				

=== Loughborough Shelthorpe ===
Loughborough Shelthorpe (2 seats)
Party	Candidate	Votes	%	±%
Labour	Robert Sharp	1,078	28.6	
Labour	Neville Stork	998	26.4	
Conservative	Geoffrey Parsons	870	23.0	
Conservative	Ann Watkinson	832	22.0	
Turnout		2,137	40.4	
Labour hold		Swing		
Labour hold		Swing		

Ward Summary
Party	Votes	% Votes	±%	Seats	Change
Labour	2,076	55.0	+10.7	2	
Conservative	1,702	45.0	+15.2	0	
Total Votes Cast	3,879				

=== Loughborough Southfields ===
Loughborough Southfields (2 seats)
Party	Candidate	Votes	%	±%
Labour	Graeme Smith	918	25.1	
Labour	Marion Smith	910	24.9	
Conservative	Ted Parton	766	20.9	
Conservative	Hanif Asmal	596	16.3	
Liberal Democrats	Diana Brass	279	7.6	
Liberal Democrats	Alan Zenthon	189	5.2	
Turnout		1,981	33.4	
Labour hold		Swing		
Labour hold		Swing		

Ward Summary
Party	Votes	% Votes	±%	Seats	Change
Labour	1,828	50.0	+7.4	2	
Conservative	1,362	37.2	+3.7	0	
Liberal Democrats	468	12.8	−11.0	0	
Total Votes Cast	3,658				

=== Loughborough Storer ===
Loughborough Storer (2 seats)
Party	Candidate	Votes	%	±%
Labour	Sandie Forrest	797	33.2	
Labour	Patrick Youell	733	30.5	
Conservative	Simon Bradshaw	475	19.8	
Conservative	Ayesha Shahid	396	16.5	
Turnout		1,490	29.8	
Labour hold		Swing		
Labour hold		Swing		

Ward Summary
Party	Votes	% Votes	±%	Seats	Change
Labour	1,530	63.7	−8.2	2	
Conservative	871	36.3	+8.2	0	
Total Votes Cast	2,401				

=== Mountsorrel ===
Mountsorrel (2 seats)
Party	Candidate	Votes	%	±%
Conservative	John Capleton	1,178	32.0	
Conservative	Jonathan Morgan	1,086	29.5	
Labour	Stan Coats	604	16.4	
Labour	Hayley Winrow	553	15.0	
UKIP	David Scott	263	7.1	
Turnout		2,134	39.7	
Conservative hold		Swing		
Conservative hold		Swing		

Ward Summary
Party	Votes	% Votes	±%	Seats	Change
Conservative	2,264	61.5	±0.0	2	
Labour	1,157	31.4	+5.8	0	
UKIP	263	7.1	N/A	0	
Total Votes Cast	3,684				

=== Queniborough ===
Queniborough (1 seat)
Party	Candidate	Votes	%	±%
Conservative	Daniel Grimley	948	78.5	−3.9
Labour	Mike McLoughlin	260	21.5	+3.9
Turnout		1,223	48.3	
Conservative hold		Swing	−3.9	

=== Quorn and Mountsorrel Castle ===
Quorn and Mountsorrel Castle (2 seats)
Party	Candidate	Votes	%	±%
Conservative	Richard Shepherd	1,721	37.4	
Conservative	David Slater	1,465	31.8	
Labour	Pat Brown	784	17.0	
Labour	Bob Parks	637	13.8	
Turnout		2,502	47.7	
Conservative hold		Swing		
Conservative hold		Swing		

Ward Summary
Party	Votes	% Votes	±%	Seats	Change
Conservative	3,186	69.2	−6.7	2	
Labour	1,421	30.8	+6.7	0	
Total Votes Cast	4,607				

=== Rothley and Thurcaston ===
Rothley and Thurcaston (2 seats)
Party	Candidate	Votes	%	±%
Conservative	Peter Osborne	1,831	39.7	
Conservative	Diane Wise	1,715	37.1	
Labour	Joanna Richardson	449	9.7	
Labour	David Young	362	7.9	
UKIP	Jamie Bye	259	5.6	
Turnout		2,564	50.9	
Conservative hold		Swing		
Conservative hold		Swing		

Ward Summary
Party	Votes	% Votes	±%	Seats	Change
Conservative	3,546	76.8	+9.8	2	
Labour	811	17.6	+4.0	0	
UKIP	259	5.6	−4.4	0	
Total Votes Cast	4,616				

=== Shepshed East ===
Shepshed East (2 seats)
Party	Candidate	Votes	%	±%
Conservative	Liz Bebbington	837	20.2	
Labour	Claire Poole	805	19.5	
Labour	Jane Lennie	802	19.4	
Conservative	Joan Tassell	728	17.6	
Liberal Democrats	Cynthia Popley	540	13.1	
Liberal Democrats	John Popley	423	10.2	
Turnout		2,196	41.6	
Conservative hold		Swing		
Labour gain from Liberal Democrats		Swing		

Ward Summary
Party	Votes	% Votes	±%	Seats	Change
Labour	1,607	38.9	+7.9	1	+1
Conservative	1,565	37.8	+16.4	1	
Liberal Democrats	963	23.3	−10.9	0	−1
Total Votes Cast	4,135				

=== Shepshed West ===
Shepshed West (2 seats)
Party	Candidate	Votes	%	±%
Conservative	Christine Radford	1,000	21.9	
Conservative	Bernard Burr	960	21.0	
Labour	Mike Cahill	934	20.4	
Labour	Ruth Sinclair	801	17.5	
Liberal Democrats	Steve Coltman	481	10.5	
Liberal Democrats	Andrew Thorpe	396	8.7	
Turnout		2,519	45.3	
Conservative hold		Swing		
Conservative hold		Swing		

Ward Summary
Party	Votes	% Votes	±%	Seats	Change
Conservative	1,960	42.9	+8.4	2	
Labour	1,735	37.9	+8.7	0	
Liberal Democrats	877	19.2	−3.8	0	
Total Votes Cast	4,572				

=== Sileby ===
Sileby (2 seats)
Party	Candidate	Votes	%	±%
Conservative	Roy Brown	1,278	35.3	
Conservative	Andy Paling	1,044	28.8	
Labour	Glenn Thurlby	674	18.6	
Labour	Richard Watson	625	17.3	
Turnout		2,078	36.8	
Conservative hold		Swing		
Conservative hold		Swing		

Ward Summary
Party	Votes	% Votes	±%	Seats	Change
Conservative	2,322	64.1	−11.1	2	
Labour	1,299	35.9	+11.1	0	
Total Votes Cast	3,621				

=== Syston East ===
Syston East (2 seats)
Party	Candidate	Votes	%	±%
Conservative	Ken Pacey	925	28.2	
Conservative	Stephen Hampson	894	27.3	
Labour	Colin Lovell	572	17.5	
Labour	Stephen Rose	542	16.5	
BNP	Mick Dyer	343	10.5	
Turnout		1,942	39.3	
Conservative hold		Swing		
Conservative hold		Swing		

Ward Summary
Party	Votes	% Votes	±%	Seats	Change
Conservative	1,819	55.5	−3.2	2	
Labour	1,114	34.0	+10.6	0	
BNP	343	10.5	−7.4	0	
Total Votes Cast	3,276				

=== Syston West ===
Syston West (2 seats)
Party	Candidate	Votes	%	±%
Conservative	Tom Barkley	1,062	32.2	
Conservative	Eric Vardy	964	29.2	
Labour	Colin Lovell	684	20.7	
Labour	Stephen Rose	591	17.9	
Turnout		1,864	35.8	
Conservative hold		Swing		
Conservative hold		Swing		

Ward Summary
Party	Votes	% Votes	±%	Seats	Change
Conservative	2,026	61.4	+8.8	2	
Labour	1,275	38.6	+3.5	0	
Total Votes Cast	3,301				

=== The Wolds ===
The Wolds (1 seat)
Party	Candidate	Votes	%	±%
Conservative	Jenny Bokor	901	62.7	+7.0
Labour	Helen Dale	298	20.7	N/A
Liberal Democrats	Ian Sharpe	238	16.6	−27.7
Turnout		1,451	57.5	
Conservative hold		Swing	−6.9	

=== Thurmaston ===
Thurmaston (3 seats)
Party	Candidate	Votes	%	±%
Conservative	Paul Harley	1,473	19.1	
Conservative	Mark Lowe	1,399	18.2	
Conservative	Brenda Seaton	1,309	17.0	
Labour	Steve Brown	1,306	17.0	
Labour	David Knaggs	1,153	15.0	
Labour	Janet Knaggs	1,058	13.7	
Turnout		3,006	39.8	
Conservative hold		Swing		
Conservative hold		Swing		
Conservative hold		Swing		

Ward Summary
Party	Votes	% Votes	±%	Seats	Change
Conservative	4,181	54.3	−2.0	3	
Labour	3,517	45.7	+12.2	0	
Total Votes Cast	7,698				

=== Wreake Villages ===
Wreake Villages (1 seat)
Party	Candidate	Votes	%	±%
Conservative	Matthew Blain	904	78.1	−5.9
Labour	Gillian Adams	253	20.7	+5.9
Turnout		1,163	50.0	
Conservative hold		Swing	−5.9	
