= 2023 Charnwood Borough Council election =

2023 UK local government election

- 4 May 2023

All 52 seats to Charnwood Borough Council 27 seats needed for a majority

| | First party | Second party |
|---|---|---|
| Leader | Jonathan Morgan | Jewel Miah |
| Party | Conservative | Labour |
| Leader's seat | Sileby & Seagrave (defeated) | Loughborough East |
| Last election | 37 seats, 71.1% | 13 seats, 33.5% |
| Seats won | 23 | 20 |
| Seat change | ▼14 | ▲7 |
| Popular vote | 34,722 | 34,743 |
| Percentage | 38.8% | 38.8% |
| Swing | ▼5.9% | ▲5.3% |
| | Third party | Fourth party |
| Party | Green | Independent |
| Last election | 1 seat, 8.6% | 1 seat, 1.8% |
| Seats won | 8 | 1 |
| Seat change | ▲7 | Steady |
| Popular vote | 15,731 | 572 |
| Percentage | 17.6% | 0.6% |
| Swing | ▲9.0% | ▼1.2% |
- Winner of each seat at the 2023 Charnwood Borough Council election
Leader before election
Jonathan Morgan
Conservative
Leader after election
Jewel Miah
Labour
No overall control

An election was held on 4 May 2023 to elect members of the Charnwood Borough Council in Leicestershire, England. This was on the same day as other local elections across England.

Prior to the election the council had been under Conservative majority control since 2007. The leader of the council was the Conservative group leader, Jonathan Morgan, who had led the council since 2017. The council went under no overall control at this election; the Conservatives lost their majority and Jonathan Morgan lost his seat.

A Labour minority administration formed after the election with informal support from the Greens. Labour group leader Jewel Miah was appointed leader of the council at the subsequent annual council meeting on 22 May 2023.

== Summary ==
=== Election result ===
2023 Charnwood Borough Council election
| Party | Candidates | Seats | Gains | Losses | Net gain/loss | Seats % | Votes % | Votes | +/− |
|---|---|---|---|---|---|---|---|---|---|
| Conservative | 46 | 23 | 0 | 5 | ▼14 | 44.2 | 38.8 | 34,722 | –5.9 |
| Labour | 52 | 20 | 5 | 0 | ▲7 | 38.5 | 38.8 | 34,743 | +5.3 |
| Green | 29 | 8 | 0 | 0 | ▲7 | 15.4 | 17.6 | 15,731 | +9.0 |
| Independent | 3 | 1 | 0 | 0 | Steady | 1.9 | 0.6 | 572 | –1.2 |
| Liberal Democrats | 14 | 0 | 0 | 0 | Steady | 0.0 | 3.0 | 2,658 | –1.7 |
| Reform | 6 | 0 | 0 | 0 | Steady | 0.0 | 1.1 | 1,028 | N/A |
| ADF | 1 | 0 | 0 | 0 | Steady | 0.0 | 0.1 | 95 | N/A |

== Ward results ==
The results for each ward were as follows:

=== Anstey ===
Anstey (2 seats)
| Party | Candidate | Votes | % | ±% |
|---|---|---|---|---|
| Conservative | Deborah Taylor | 998 | 54.0 | |
| Conservative | Paul Baines | 840 | 45.5 | |
| Labour | Dave Berry | 597 | 32.3 | |
| Labour | Simon Alborn | 501 | 27.1 | |
| Green | Philip Mills | 334 | 18.1 | |
| Independent | Alan Chapman | 272 | 14.7 | |
| Turnout | | 1,848 | 31.2 | |
| Registered electors | | 5,915 | | |
| Conservative hold | | | | |
| Conservative hold | | | | |

=== Barrow upon Soar ===
Barrow upon Soar (2 seats)
| Party | Candidate | Votes | % | ±% |
|---|---|---|---|---|
| Labour | Claire Forrest | 792 | 45.0 | |
| Conservative | Hilary Fryer | 745 | 42.3 | |
| Conservative | Pauline Ranson | 717 | 40.7 | |
| Labour | David Brentnall | 521 | 29.6 | |
| Green | Paul Goodman | 261 | 14.8 | |
| Liberal Democrats | Philip Thornborow | 164 | 9.3 | |
| ADF | Caroline Simpson-Reynolds | 95 | 5.4 | |
| Turnout | | 1,761 | 33.6 | |
| Registered electors | | 5,247 | | |
| Labour win (new seat) | | | | |
| Conservative win (new seat) | | | | |

=== Birstall East and Wanlip ===
Birstall East and Wanlip (2 seats)
| Party | Candidate | Votes | % | ±% |
|---|---|---|---|---|
| Conservative | Andy Dent | 783 | 48.7 | |
| Labour Co-op | Julie Palmer | 657 | 40.9 | |
| Conservative | Katie Seaton | 647 | 40.2 | |
| Labour Co-op | Jeff Cassidy | 590 | 36.7 | |
| Green | Pritesh Patel | 265 | 16.5 | |
| Turnout | | 1,608 | 30.3 | |
| Registered electors | | 5,300 | | |
| Conservative win (new seat) | | | | |
| Labour Co-op win (new seat) | | | | |

=== Birstall West ===
Birstall West (2 seats)
| Party | Candidate | Votes | % | ±% |
|---|---|---|---|---|
| Conservative | Shona Rattray | 1,036 | 53.4 | |
| Conservative | Glenn Matthews | 828 | 42.7 | |
| Labour | Dave Thomas | 749 | 38.6 | |
| Labour | Andrea Scott | 628 | 32.4 | |
| Green | Mick Howkins | 284 | 14.6 | |
| Turnout | | 1,939 | 34.7 | |
| Registered electors | | 5,584 | | |
| Conservative win (new seat) | | | | |
| Conservative win (new seat) | | | | |

=== Dishley, Hathern and Thorpe Acre ===
Dishley, Hathern and Thorpe Acre (3 seats)
| Party | Candidate | Votes | % | ±% |
|---|---|---|---|---|
| Independent | Roy Campsall | 1,182 | 47.3 | |
| Conservative | Sarah Monk | 1,028 | 41.2 | |
| Labour | Kanchan Jadeja | 943 | 37.8 | |
| Labour | Abe Khayer | 876 | 35.1 | |
| Labour | Adeola Obadina | 796 | 31.9 | |
| Green | David Kellock | 558 | 22.3 | |
| Reform | Martin Moreland | 315 | 12.6 | |
| Turnout | | 2,497 | 35.9 | |
| Registered electors | | 6,957 | | |
| Independent win (new seat) | | | | |
| Conservative win (new seat) | | | | |
| Labour win (new seat) | | | | |

=== Forest Bradgate ===
Forest Bradgate
| Party | Candidate | Votes | % | ±% |
|---|---|---|---|---|
| Conservative | David Snartt | 695 | 67.9 | |
| Labour | Sue Munroe | 203 | 19.8 | |
| Green | Josephine Razzell | 126 | 12.3 | |
| Majority | | 492 | 48.1 | |
| Turnout | | 1,025 | 41.3 | |
| Registered electors | | 2,481 | | |
| Conservative hold | | Swing | | |

=== Loughborough Ashby ===
Loughton Ashby (3 seats)
| Party | Candidate | Votes | % | ±% |
|---|---|---|---|---|
| Labour | Julie Bradshaw | 890 | 59.5 | |
| Labour | Ian Ashcroft | 812 | 54.2 | |
| Labour | Nathaniel Taylor | 707 | 47.2 | |
| Conservative | James Crowe | 433 | 28.9 | |
| Green | Sean Kerslake | 367 | 24.5 | |
| Conservative | Shazzadur Rahman | 360 | 24.0 | |
| Reform | Peter Morris | 246 | 16.4 | |
| Turnout | | 1,497 | 25.5 | |
| Registered electors | | 5,874 | | |
| Labour hold | | | | |
| Labour hold | | | | |
| Labour win (new seat) | | | | |

=== Loughborough East ===
Loughborough East (3 seats)
| Party | Candidate | Votes | % | ±% |
|---|---|---|---|---|
| Labour | Jewel Miah | 1,455 | 62.0 | |
| Labour | Louise Jones | 1,367 | 58.2 | |
| Labour | Colin Hamilton | 1,322 | 56.3 | |
| Green | Daisy Taylor | 483 | 20.6 | |
| Conservative | Will Hunt | 477 | 20.3 | |
| Independent | Sabbir Ahmed | 300 | 12.8 | |
| Liberal Democrats | Josh Nighingale | 255 | 10.9 | |
| Turnout | | 2,347 | 28.1 | |
| Registered electors | | 8,365 | | |
| Labour win (new seat) | | | | |
| Labour win (new seat) | | | | |
| Labour win (new seat) | | | | |

=== Loughborough Nanpantan ===
Loughborough Nanpatan
| Party | Candidate | Votes | % | ±% |
|---|---|---|---|---|
| Conservative | Margaret Smidowicz | 593 | 45.5 | |
| Labour | Sara Goodwin | 542 | 41.6 | |
| Green | John Barton | 91 | 7.0 | |
| Liberal Democrats | David Walker | 77 | 5.9 | |
| Majority | | 51 | 3.9 | |
| Turnout | | 1,308 | 45.7 | |
| Registered electors | | 2,863 | | |
| Conservative hold | | Swing | | |

=== Loughborough Outwoods and Shelthorpe ===
Loughton Outwoods and Shelthorpe (3 seats)
| Party | Candidate | Votes | % | ±% |
|---|---|---|---|---|
| Labour | Anne Gray | 1,475 | 52.2 | |
| Labour | Beverley Gray | 1,441 | 51.0 | |
| Labour | Sarah Maynard | 1,197 | 42.4 | |
| Conservative | Richard Bailey | 968 | 34.3 | |
| Conservative | Terry Nicholson | 896 | 31.7 | |
| Conservative | Gopal Sharma | 839 | 29.7 | |
| Green | Alison Large | 481 | 17.0 | |
| Liberal Democrats | Alex Guerrero | 288 | 10.2 | |
| Reform | Jim Foxall | 170 | 6.0 | |
| Turnout | | 2,824 | 34.6 | |
| Registered electors | | 8,153 | | |
| Labour win (new seat) | | | | |
| Labour win (new seat) | | | | |
| Labour win (new seat) | | | | |

=== Loughborough Southfields ===
Loughborough Southfields (2 seats)
| Party | Candidate | Votes | % | ±% |
|---|---|---|---|---|
| Labour Co-op | Sarah Goode | 717 | 52.0 | |
| Labour Co-op | Rhys Cory-Lowsley | 652 | 47.3 | |
| Conservative | Ted Parton | 573 | 41.6 | |
| Conservative | Geoff Parsons | 430 | 31.2 | |
| Green | Andy Patrick | 256 | 18.6 | |
| Turnout | | 1,378 | 33.0 | |
| Registered electors | | 4,174 | | |
| Labour Co-op gain from Conservative | | | | |
| Labour Co-op gain from Conservative | | | | |

=== Loughborough Storer ===
Loughborough Storer (2 seats)
| Party | Candidate | Votes | % | ±% |
|---|---|---|---|---|
| Labour | Sandie Forrest | 589 | 58.7 | |
| Labour | Jenni Tillotson | 587 | 58.5 | |
| Conservative | Judy Shields | 249 | 24.8 | |
| Green | Susan Warner | 168 | 16.7 | |
| Liberal Democrats | Cynthia Popley | 132 | 13.1 | |
| Turnout | | 1,004 | 21.7 | |
| Registered electors | | 4,633 | | |
| Labour hold | | | | |
| Labour hold | | | | |

=== Loughborough Woodthorpe ===
Loughborough Woodthorpe
| Party | Candidate | Votes | % | ±% |
|---|---|---|---|---|
| Labour | Birgitta Worrall | 589 | 54.8 | |
| Conservative | Chris Stewart | 267 | 24.9 | |
| Green | Rachel Baker | 105 | 9.8 | |
| Liberal Democrats | Graeme Smith | 75 | 7.0 | |
| Reform | Ben Asare | 38 | 3.5 | |
| Majority | | 322 | 29.9 | |
| Turnout | | 1,078 | 34.3 | |
| Registered electors | | 3,144 | | |
| Labour win (new seat) | | | | |

=== Mountsorrel ===
Mountsorrel (2 seats)
| Party | Candidate | Votes | % | ±% |
|---|---|---|---|---|
| Labour Co-op | Liz Blackshaw | 853 | 52.7 | |
| Conservative | Leigh Emmins | 637 | 39.3 | |
| Labour Co-op | Sebastian Russell-Smith | 633 | 39.1 | |
| Conservative | Simon Oates | 567 | 35.0 | |
| Green | Paul Masters | 216 | 13.3 | |
| Liberal Democrats | Marianne Gilbert | 139 | 8.6 | |
| Turnout | | 1,620 | 28.4 | |
| Registered electors | | 5,706 | | |
| Labour Co-op gain from Conservative | | | | |
| Conservative hold | | | | |

=== Quorn and Mountsorrel Castle ===
Quorn and Mountsorrel Castle (2 seats)
| Party | Candidate | Votes | % | ±% |
|---|---|---|---|---|
| Conservative | Sarah Fox | 933 | 45.9 | |
| Conservative | Lee Westley | 892 | 43.9 | |
| Labour | Josh Clayton | 712 | 35.1 | |
| Labour | Chris Hughes | 662 | 32.6 | |
| Green | Steven Bellamy | 317 | 15.6 | |
| Liberal Democrats | Carolyn Thornborow | 228 | 11.2 | |
| Reform | Andy McWilliam | 113 | 5.6 | |
| Turnout | | 2,031 | 35.9 | |
| Registered electors | | 5,662 | | |
| Conservative hold | | | | |
| Conservative hold | | | | |

=== Rothley Brook ===
Rothley Brook (3 seats)
| Party | Candidate | Votes | % | ±% |
|---|---|---|---|---|
| Conservative | Mark Charles | 1,097 | 54.1 | |
| Conservative | Leon Hadji-Nikolaou | 1,084 | 53.4 | |
| Conservative | John Knight | 959 | 47.3 | |
| Labour | Richard Thornton | 637 | 31.4 | |
| Labour | David Edwards | 584 | 28.8 | |
| Labour | Emma Ward | 571 | 28.1 | |
| Green | David Cannon | 463 | 22.8 | |
| Turnout | | 2,029 | 33.1 | |
| Registered electors | | 6,123 | | |
| Conservative win (new seat) | | | | |
| Conservative win (new seat) | | | | |
| Conservative win (new seat) | | | | |

=== Shepshed East ===
Shepshed East (2 seats)
| Party | Candidate | Votes | % | ±% |
|---|---|---|---|---|
| Labour | Myriam Roberts | 724 | 44.6 | |
| Conservative | Robin Popley | 649 | 40.0 | |
| Conservative | Neal Bestwick | 607 | 37.4 | |
| Labour | Samanta Zubrute Clarke | 575 | 35.4 | |
| Green | Greg Simpson | 256 | 15.8 | |
| Liberal Democrats | Grantley Lycett | 221 | 13.6 | |
| Turnout | | 1,623 | 27.1 | |
| Registered electors | | 5,999 | | |
| Labour gain from Conservative | | | | |
| Conservative hold | | | | |

=== Shepshed West ===
Shepshed West (2 seats)
| Party | Candidate | Votes | % | ±% |
|---|---|---|---|---|
| Labour | Jane Lennie | 767 | 47.1 | |
| Conservative | David Northage | 685 | 42.1 | |
| Labour | Louise Taylor-Durant | 622 | 38.2 | |
| Conservative | Steven Springthorpe | 550 | 33.8 | |
| Liberal Democrats | John Popley | 231 | 14.2 | |
| Liberal Democrats | Katy Duncan | 174 | 10.7 | |
| Turnout | | 1,628 | 28.5 | |
| Registered electors | | 5,720 | | |
| Labour gain from Conservative | | | | |
| Conservative hold | | | | |

=== Sileby and Seagrave ===
Sileby and Seagrave (3 seats)
| Party | Candidate | Votes | % | ±% |
|---|---|---|---|---|
| Green | Geoff Lawrence | 1,169 | 54.8 | |
| Green | Faye Forde | 1,132 | 53.0 | |
| Green | Naomi Bottomley | 1,128 | 52.8 | |
| Conservative | Paula Dolby-Campbell | 569 | 26.7 | |
| Conservative | Jonathan Morgan | 514 | 24.1 | |
| Conservative | Sue Gerrard | 463 | 21.7 | |
| Labour Co-op | Valerie Marriott | 361 | 16.9 | |
| Labour Co-op | Kaisra Khan | 343 | 16.1 | |
| Labour Co-op | Max Hunt | 314 | 14.7 | |
| Liberal Democrats | Murray Sinclair | 76 | 3.6 | |
| Turnout | | 2,135 | 29.7 | |
| Registered electors | | 7,196 | | |
| Green win (new seat) | | | | |
| Green win (new seat) | | | | |
| Green win (new seat) | | | | |

=== South Charnwood ===
South Charnwood
| Party | Candidate | Votes | % | ±% |
|---|---|---|---|---|
| Conservative | Matthew Brookes | 148 | 45.7 | |
| Labour | David Young | 130 | 40.1 | |
| Green | Meg Isaac | 46 | 14.2 | |
| Majority | | 18 | 5.6 | |
| Turnout | | 326 | 31.9 | |
| Registered electors | | 1,021 | | |
| Conservative win (new seat) | | | | |

=== Syston ===
Syston (3 seats)
| Party | Candidate | Votes | % | ±% |
|---|---|---|---|---|
| Green | Andrew Haynes | 990 | 41.8 | |
| Conservative | Sarah Braker | 968 | 40.9 | |
| Green | David Infield | 926 | 39.1 | |
| Conservative | Simon Bradshaw | 918 | 38.8 | |
| Green | Dave Isaac | 888 | 37.5 | |
| Conservative | Katrina Poland | 706 | 29.8 | |
| Labour | Emma Carter | 387 | 16.4 | |
| Labour | Daniel Baumann | 373 | 15.8 | |
| Labour | Deb Green | 361 | 15.3 | |
| Reform | Ian Hayes | 146 | 6.2 | |
| Turnout | | 2,366 | 27.9 | |
| Registered electors | | 8,496 | | |
| Green win (new seat) | | | | |
| Conservative win (new seat) | | | | |
| Green win (new seat) | | | | |

=== The Wolds ===
The Wolds
| Party | Candidate | Votes | % | ±% |
|---|---|---|---|---|
| Conservative | Jenny Bokor | 511 | 47.5 | |
| Liberal Democrats | Ian Sharpe | 290 | 27.0 | |
| Labour | Jim Clarke | 159 | 14.8 | |
| Green | Nigel Feetham | 116 | 10.8 | |
| Majority | | 221 | 20.5 | |
| Turnout | | 1,081 | 41.9 | |
| Registered electors | | 2,578 | | |
| Conservative hold | | Swing | | |

=== Thurmaston ===
Thurmaston (3 seats)
| Party | Candidate | Votes | % | ±% |
|---|---|---|---|---|
| Conservative | Brenda Seaton | 1,216 | 53.6 | |
| Conservative | Mark Lowe | 1,177 | 51.9 | |
| Conservative | Gina Jackson | 1,135 | 50.0 | |
| Labour | Claire Jackson | 707 | 31.1 | |
| Labour | Brendon Brockway | 705 | 31.1 | |
| Labour | Michael McPartland | 602 | 26.5 | |
| Liberal Democrats | Carolyn Brown | 308 | 13.6 | |
| Green | Louise Hall | 277 | 12.2 | |
| Turnout | | 2,270 | 30.2 | |
| Registered electors | | 7,512 | | |
| Conservative hold | | | | |
| Conservative hold | | | | |
| Conservative hold | | | | |

=== Wreake Valley ===
Wreake Valley (3 seats)
| Party | Candidate | Votes | % | ±% |
|---|---|---|---|---|
| Green | Laurie Needham | 1,493 | 52.2 | |
| Green | Sandra Woodward | 1,274 | 44.5 | |
| Green | Chris O'Neill | 1,261 | 44.1 | |
| Conservative | Daniel Grimley | 1,185 | 41.4 | |
| Conservative | James Poland | 1,123 | 39.3 | |
| Conservative | Anthea Byrne | 1,027 | 35.9 | |
| Labour | Gillian Adams | 266 | 9.3 | |
| Labour | Natalie Worth | 252 | 8.8 | |
| Labour | Pauline May | 248 | 8.7 | |
| Turnout | | 2,860 | 33.5 | |
| Registered electors | | 8,550 | | |
| Green win (new seat) | | | | |
| Green win (new seat) | | | | |
| Green win (new seat) | | | | |

== Changes 2023-2027 ==
=== By-elections ===
==== Sileby and Seagrave ====
Sileby and Seagrave by-election: 31 October 2024
| Party | Candidate | Votes | % | ±% |
|---|---|---|---|---|
| Green | Steve Bellamy | 752 | 52.9 | –0.8 |
| Reform | Pete Morris | 297 | 20.9 | N/A |
| Conservative | Sue Gerrard | 262 | 18.4 | –7.8 |
| Labour | Kaisra Khan | 70 | 4.9 | –11.7 |
| Liberal Democrats | Alistair Duffy | 40 | 2.8 | –0.7 |
| Majority | | 455 | 32.0 | N/A |
| Turnout | | 1,422 | 18.8 | –10.9 |
| Registered electors | | 7,581 | | |
| Green hold | | | | |

==== Wreake Valley ====
Wreake Valley by-election: 17 September 2026
| Party | Candidate | Votes | % | ±% |
|---|---|---|---|---|
| Conservative | James Poland | 1,091 | 48.2 | +8.0 |
| Reform | Michael Slade | 706 | 31.2 | N/A |
| Green | Hamzah Sheikh | 372 | 16.4 | −34.3 |
| Labour | Jay Dyas | 69 | 3.1 | −6.0 |
| Liberal Democrats | Murray Sinclair | 24 | 1.1 | N/A |
| Majority | | 385 | 17.0 | N/A |
| Turnout | | 2262 | 26.3 | −7.2 |
| Conservative gain from Green | | Swing | | |

The by-election was triggered after incumbent Green councillor and Leader of the Green Group Laurie Needham resigned.
