= Charnwood Borough Council =

Non-metropolitan district in England

Type
- Type: Non-metropolitan district

History
- Founded: 1 April 1974

Leadership
- Mayor: Colin Hamilton, Labour since 11 May 2026
- Leader: Jewel Miah, Labour since 22 May 2023
- Chief Executive: Rob Mitchell since 2019

Structure
- Seats: 52 councillors
- Graph of the party split among 52 seats.
- Political groups: Administration (20) Labour (20) Other parties (32) Conservative (22) Green (8) Independent (2)
- Length of term: 4 years

Elections
- Last election: 4 May 2023

Meeting place
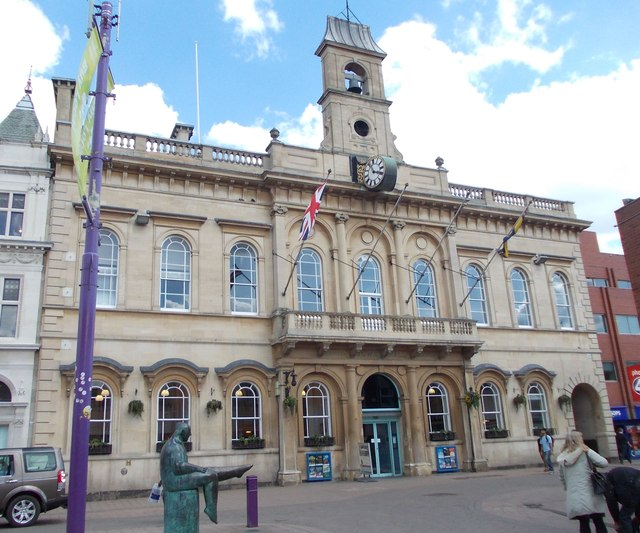
- Town Hall, Market Place, Loughborough, LE11 3EB

Website
- www.charnwood.gov.uk

Charnwood Borough Council is the local authority for the Borough of Charnwood, a non-metropolitan district in Leicestershire, England. Full council meetings are held at Loughborough Town Hall and the council's main offices are on Southfield Road in Loughborough. The council has been under no overall control since 2023, being run by a Labour minority administration with informal support from the Green Party.

== Governance ==
Charnwood Borough Council provides district-level services. County-level services are provided by Leicestershire County Council. Much of the borough is also covered by civil parishes, which form a third tier of local government.

The leader and cabinet model of decision-making is used by the council. It consists of 52 councillors, overseen by a mayor, leader and cabinet.

== Political control ==
The council has been under no overall control since the 2023 election, being run by a Labour minority administration with informal support from the Greens.

The first election to the council was held in 1973, initially operating as a shadow authority alongside the outgoing authorities before coming into its powers on 1 April 1974. Since 1974 political control of the council has been as follows:

Party in control	Years
No overall control	1974–1976
Conservative	1976–1995
Labour	1995–1999
No overall control	1999–2007
Conservative	2007–2023
No overall control	2023–present

== Leadership ==
The role of mayor is ceremonial in Charnwood. Political leadership is instead provided by the Leader of the council. The leaders since 2010 have been:

Councillor	Party	From	To
David Slater	Conservative	2010	6 Nov 2017
Jonathan Morgan	Conservative	6 Nov 2017	May 2023
Jewel Miah	Labour	22 May 2023	

== Composition ==
Following the 2023 election, and subsequent changes up to September 2026, the composition of the council was:

Party	Seats
Labour	20
Conservative	22
Green	8
Independent	2
Total	52

=== Elections ===
Since the last boundary changes in 2023 the council has comprised 52 councillors, representing 24 wards, with each ward electing one, two or three councillors. Elections are held every four years.

There are three Parliamentary constituencies covering the district. Mid Leicestershire is represented by the Conservative Peter Bedford MP. Loughborough is represented by the Labour's Jeevun Sandher. Melton and Syston is represented by the Conservative Edward Argar MP.

== Premises ==
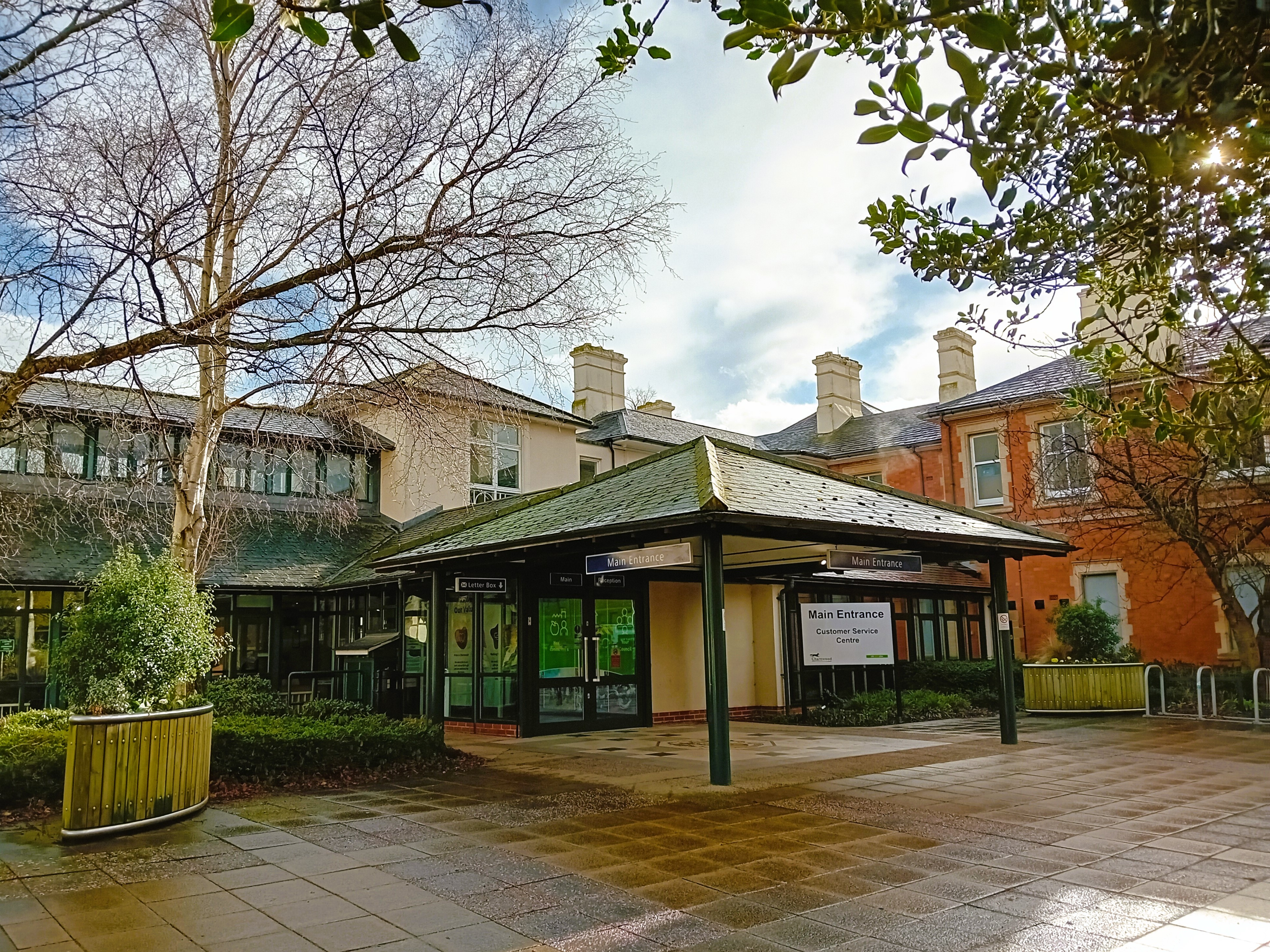
Council Offices, Southfield Road, Loughborough, LE11 2TX: Council's headquarters

Full council meetings are generally held at Loughborough Town Hall. The council's administrative offices are the Council Offices on Southfield Road in Loughborough, where some committee meetings are also held. The older part of the Council Offices building was an early 19th century house called Southfields. The house was acquired by the old Loughborough Town Council during the Second World War and after the war was converted to be additional offices supplementing those at Loughborough Town Hall. A large extension was added to Southfields in 1990 allowing it to become Charnwood's main offices.
